= 2021 in association football =

The following are the scheduled events of association football for the year 2021 throughout the world.

== Events ==
=== Men's national teams ===
==== FIFA ====
- 22 July – 7 August: Football at the 2020 Summer Olympics – Men's tournament in Japan
  - (gold) : Brazil
  - (silver) : Spain
  - (bronze) : Mexico
  - 4th: Japan
- 19–29 August: 2021 FIFA Beach Soccer World Cup in Russia
  - (gold) : RFU
  - (silver) : Japan
  - (bronze) : Switzerland
  - 4th: Senegal
- 12 September – 3 October: 2021 FIFA Futsal World Cup in Lithuania
  - (gold) : Portugal
  - (silver) : Argentina
  - (bronze) : Brazil
  - 4th: Kazakhstan
- 30 November – 18 December: 2021 FIFA Arab Cup in Qatar
  - (gold) : Algeria
  - (silver) : Tunisia
  - (bronze) : Qatar
  - 4th: Egypt

==== AFC ====
===== AFF =====
- 5 December – 1 January 2022: 2020 AFF Championship in Singapore
  - (gold) : Thailand
  - (silver) : Indonesia
  - (bronze) : Vietnam
  - (bronze) Singapore

===== CAFA =====
- 19–23 November: 2021 CAFA U-15 Championship in Dushanbe
  - (gold) : Iran
  - (silver) : Tajikistan
  - (bronze) : Uzbekistan
  - 4th: Kyrgyzstan

===== SAFF =====
- 1–16 October: 2021 SAFF Championship in Maldives
  - (gold) : India
  - (silver) : Nepal
  - (bronze) : Maldives
  - 4th: Bangladesh

===== WAFF =====
- 4–12 October: 2021 WAFF U-23 Championship in Saudi Arabia
  - (gold) : Jordan
  - (silver) : Saudi Arabia
  - (bronze) : Iraq
  - (bronze) : Syria
- 20 November – 1 December: 2021 WAFF U-18 Championship in Iraq
  - (gold) : Iraq
  - (silver) : Lebanon

==== UAFA ====
- 20–29 May: 2021 Arab Futsal Cup in Egypt
  - (gold) : Morocco
  - (silver) : Egypt
  - (bronze) : Bahrain
  - (bronze) : United Arab Emirates
- 20 June – 6 July: 2021 Arab Cup U-20 in Egypt
  - (gold) : Saudi Arabia
  - (silver) : Algeria
  - (bronze) : Egypt
  - (bronze) : Tunisia

==== CAF ====
- 16 January – 7 February: 2020 African Nations Championship in Cameroon
  - (gold) : Morocco
  - (silver) : Mali
  - (bronze) : Guinea
  - 4th: Cameroon
- 14 February – 6 March: 2021 Africa U-20 Cup of Nations in Mauritania
  - (gold) : Ghana
  - (silver) : Uganda
  - (bronze) : Gambia
  - 4th: Tunisia
- 23–29 May: 2021 Africa Beach Soccer Cup of Nations in Senegal
  - (gold) : Senegal
  - (silver) : Mozambique
  - (bronze) : Morocco
  - 4th: Uganda

===== CECAFA =====
- 17–31 July: 2021 CECAFA U-23 Challenge Cup in Ethiopia
  - (gold) : Tanzania
  - (silver) : Burundi
  - (bronze) : South Sudan
  - 4th: Kenya

===== COSAFA =====
- 7–18 July: 2021 COSAFA Cup in Port Elizabeth
  - (gold) : South Africa
  - (silver) : Senegal
  - (bronze) : Eswatini
  - 4th: Mozambique
- 1 December –: 2021 COSAFA Under-17 Championship in Lesotho
  - (gold) : Angola
  - (silver) : Zambia
  - (bronze) : Malawi
  - 4th: Eswatini

===== UNAF =====
- 18–24 January: 2021 UNAF U-17 Tournament in Algeria
  - (gold) : Algeria
  - (silver) : Tunisia
  - (bronze) : Libya
- 8–17 November: 2021 UNAF U-20 Tournament in Tunisia
  - (gold) : Tunisia
  - (silver) : Egypt
  - (bronze) : Mauritania
  - 4th: Algeria

===== WAFU =====
- 5–18 January: 2021 WAFU Zone B U-17 Tournament in Togo
  - (gold) : Ivory Coast
  - (silver) : Nigeria
  - (bronze) : Burkina Faso
  - 4th: Niger
- 5–13 February: 2021 WAFU Zone A U-17 Tournament in Senegal
  - (gold) : Senegal
  - (silver) : Mali
  - (bronze) : Guinea-Bissau
  - (bronze) : Mauritania

==== CONCACAF ====
- 3–9 May: 2021 CONCACAF Futsal Championship in Guatemala
  - (gold) : Costa Rica
  - (silver) : United States
  - (bronze) : Guatemala
  - 4th: Panama
- 3–6 June: 2021 CONCACAF Nations League Finals in United States
  - (gold) : United States
  - (silver) : Mexico
  - (bronze) : Honduras
  - 4th: Costa Rica
- 10 July – 1 August: 2021 CONCACAF Gold Cup in United States
  - (gold) : United States
  - (silver) : Mexico
  - (bronze) : Canada
  - (bronze) : Qatar

==== CONMEBOL ====
- 13 June – 10 July: 2021 Copa América in Brazil
  - (gold) : Argentina
  - (silver) : Brazil
  - (bronze) : Colombia
  - 4th: Peru

==== UEFA ====
- 24–31 March (group stage), 31 May – 6 June (knockout stage): 2021 UEFA European Under-21 Championship in Hungary and Slovenia
  - (gold) : Germany
  - (silver) : Portugal
  - (bronze) : Netherlands
  - (bronze) : Spain
- 11 June – 11 July: UEFA Euro 2020 in 11 European countries (Final in England)
  - (gold) : Italy
  - (silver) : England
  - (bronze) : Denmark
  - (bronze) : Spain
- 6–10 October: 2021 UEFA Nations League Finals in Italy
  - (gold) : France
  - (silver) : Spain
  - (bronze) : Italy
  - 4th: Belgium

==== Invitational ====
- 23–29 March: 2021 Three Nations Cup in Nepal
  - (gold) : Nepal
  - (silver) : Bangladesh
  - (bronze) : Kyrgyzstan U23
- 26–29 May: 2021 Valeri Lobanovsky Memorial Tournament in Ukraine
  - (gold) : Uzbekistan
  - (silver) : Azerbaijan
  - (bronze) : Ukraine
- 1–10 June: 2020 Baltic Cup in Vilnius, Riga and Tallinn
  - (gold) : Estonia
  - (silver) : Latvia
  - (bronze) : Lithuania
- 2–7 September: 2021 Three Nations Cup in Kyrgyzstan
  - (gold) : Kyrgyzstan
  - (silver) : Palestine
  - (bronze) : Bangladesh
- 8–19 November: 2021 Four Nations Football Tournament in Sri Lanka
  - (gold) : Seychelles
  - (silver) : Sri Lanka
  - (bronze) : Bangladesh
  - 4th: Maldives
- 8–13 December–: 2021 Copa Raúl Coloma Rivas in Chile
  - (gold) : Colombia
  - (silver) : Uruguay
  - (bronze) : Chile
  - 4th: Paraguay

=== Women's national teams ===
==== FIFA ====
- 21 July – 6 August: Football at the 2020 Summer Olympics – Women's tournament in Japan
  - (gold) : Canada
  - (silver) : Sweden
  - (bronze) : United States
  - 4th: Australia

==== AFC ====
===== CAFA =====
- 11–17 June: 2021 CAFA U-20 Women's Championship in (Tajikistan) Dushanbe
  - (gold) : Uzbekistan
  - (silver) : Iran
  - (bronze) : Kyrgyzstan
  - 4th: Afghanistan
- 30 June – 9 July: 2021 CAFA U-17 Women's Championship in Dushanbe
  - (gold) : Uzbekistan
  - (silver) : Iran
  - (bronze) : Tajikistan
  - 4th: Afghanistan

==== SAFF ====
- 11–22 December: 2021 SAFF U-19 Women's Championship in Dhaka
  - (gold) : Bangladesh
  - (silver) : India
  - (bronze) : Nepal
  - 4th: Bhutan

==== UAFA ====
- 24 August – 6 September: 2021 Arab Women's Cup in Egypt
  - (gold) : Jordan
  - (silver) : Tunisia
  - (bronze) : Algeria
  - (bronze) : Egypt

==== CAF ====
===== CECAFA =====
- 30 October – 9 November: 2021 CECAFA Women's U20 Championship in Uganda
  - (gold) : Ethiopia
  - (silver) : Uganda
  - (bronze) : Tanzania
  - 4th: Burundi

===== COSAFA =====
- 28 September – 9 October: 2021 COSAFA Women's Championship in Port Elizabeth
  - (gold) : Tanzania
  - (silver) : Malawi
  - (bronze) : Zambia
  - 4th: South Africa

==== Invitational ====
- 17–23 February: 2021 Turkish Women's Cup in Turkey
  - (gold) : Nigeria
  - (silver) : Uzbekistan
  - (bronze) : (Russia) CSKA Moscow
  - 4th: Equatorial Guinea
- 18–23 February: 2021 Malta International Women's Football Tournament in Malta
  - (gold) : Sweden
  - (silver) : Slovakia
  - (bronze) : Austria
  - 4th: Malta
- 18–24 February: 2021 'Three Nations, One Goal' Cup in Brussels, Aachen and Venlo
  - (gold) : Netherlands
  - (silver) : Germany
  - (bronze) : Belgium
- 18–24 February: 2021 SheBelieves Cup in United States
  - (gold) : United States
  - (silver) : Brazil
  - (bronze) : Canada
  - 4th: Argentina
- 5–11 April: 2021 Three Nations Cup in Uzbekistan
  - (gold) : Belarus
  - (silver) : Uzbekistan
  - (bronze) : India
- 7–12 April: Four Nation Tournament in Armenia
  - (gold) : Lithuania
  - (silver) : Armenia
  - (bronze) : Jordan
  - 4th: Lebanon
- 8–14 June: Bansko Pirin Women's Cup in Bulgaria
  - (gold) : Bulgaria
  - (silver) : North Macedonia
  - (bronze) : Albania
- 10–13 June: 2020 Baltic Women's Cup in Alytus
  - (gold) : Lithuania
  - (silver) : Faroe Islands
  - (bronze) : Estonia
  - 4th: Latvia
- 10–15 June: Three Nations Training Tournament in Bohuslän
  - (gold) : Sweden
  - (silver) : France
  - (bronze) : Finland
- 27–29 June: 2020 Baltic Women's U19 Cup in Tallinn
  - (gold) : Latvia
  - (silver) : Estonia
  - (bronze) : Lithuania
- 25 November – 1 December: 2021 International Women's Football Tournament of Manaus in Brazil
  - (gold) : Brazil
  - (silver) : Chile
  - (bronze) : Venezuela
  - 4th: India

== Club continental champions ==
=== Men ===
Region	Tournament	Defending champion	Champion	Title	Last honour
AFC (Asia)	2021 AFC Champions League	(South Korea) Ulsan Hyundai	(Saudi Arabia) Al-Hilal	4th	2019
AFC (Asia)	2021 AFC Cup	(Lebanon) Al-Ahed (2019)	(Bahrain) Al-Muharraq	2nd	2008
AFC (Asia)	2021 ASEAN Club Championship	(Singapore) Tampines Rovers (2005)	Season postponed to 2022, due to the COVID-19 pandemic		
AFC (Asia)	2021 AFC Futsal Club Championship	(Japan) Nagoya Oceans (2019)	Season cancelled, due to the COVID-19 pandemic		
CAF (Africa)	2020–21 CAF Champions League	(Egypt) Al Ahly	(Egypt) Al Ahly	10th	2019–20
CAF (Africa)	2020–21 CAF Confederation Cup	(Morocco) RS Berkane	(Morocco) Raja Casablanca	2nd	2018
CAF (Africa)	2021 CAF Super Cup (May)	(Egypt) Zamalek	(Egypt) Al Ahly	7th	2014
CAF (Africa)	2021 CAF Super Cup (December)	(Egypt) Al Ahly	(Egypt) Al Ahly	8th	2021 (May)
CONCACAF (North and Central America, Caribbean)	2021 CONCACAF Champions League	(Mexico) UANL	(Mexico) Monterrey	5th	2019
CONCACAF (North and Central America, Caribbean)	2021 CONCACAF League	(Costa Rica) Alajuelense	(Guatemala) Comunicaciones	1st	—
CONCACAF (North and Central America, Caribbean)	2021 Caribbean Club Championship	(Jamaica) Portmore United (2019)	(Haiti) Cavaly	1st	—
CONCACAF (North and Central America, Caribbean)	2021 Caribbean Club Shield	(Suriname) Robinhood (2019)	Season cancelled, due to the COVID-19 pandemic		
CONMEBOL (South America)	2021 Copa Libertadores	(Brazil) Palmeiras	(Brazil) Palmeiras	3rd	2020
CONMEBOL (South America)	2021 Copa Sudamericana	(Argentina) Defensa y Justicia	(Brazil) Athletico Paranaense	2nd	2018
CONMEBOL (South America)	2021 Recopa Sudamericana	(Brazil) Flamengo	(Argentina) Defensa y Justicia	1st	—
CONMEBOL (South America)	2021 Copa Libertadores de Futsal	(Brazil) Carlos Barbosa (2019)	(Argentina) San Lorenzo	1st	—
OFC (Oceania)	2021 OFC Champions League	(New Caledonia) Hienghène Sport (2019)	Season cancelled, due to the COVID-19 pandemic		
OFC (Oceania)	2021 OFC Futsal Champions League	(Solomon Islands) Kooline	Season cancelled, due to the COVID-19 pandemic		
UEFA (Europe)	2020–21 UEFA Champions League	(Germany) Bayern Munich	(England) Chelsea	2nd	2011–12
UEFA (Europe)	2020–21 UEFA Europa League	(Spain) Sevilla	(Spain) Villarreal	1st	—
UEFA (Europe)	2021 UEFA Super Cup	(Germany) Bayern Munich	(England) Chelsea	2nd	1998
UEFA (Europe)	2020–21 UEFA Youth League	(Spain) Real Madrid	Season cancelled, due to the COVID-19 pandemic		
UEFA (Europe)	2020–21 UEFA Futsal Champions League	(Spain) Barcelona	(Portugal) Sporting CP	2nd	2018–19
UEFA (Europe)	2021 UEFA Regions' Cup	(Poland) Lower Silesia	Season cancelled, due to the COVID-19 pandemic		
UAFA (Arab States)	2020–21 Arab Club Champions Cup	(Morocco) Raja Casablanca	Season cancelled, due to the COVID-19 pandemic		
FIFA (Global)	2021 FIFA Club World Cup	(Germany) Bayern Munich	(England) Chelsea	1st	—

=== Women ===
Region	Tournament	Defending champion	Champion	Title	Last honour
AFC (Asia)	2021 AFC Women's Club Championship	(Japan) Nippon TV Beleza (2019)	(Jordan) Amman SC	1st	—
AFC (Asia)	2021 WAFF Women's Clubs Championship	(Jordan) Shabab Ordon (2019)	Season postponed to 2022, due to the COVID-19 pandemic		
CAF (Africa)	2021 CAF Women's Champions League	The first edition	(South Africa) Mamelodi Sundowns	1st	―
CONMEBOL (South America)	2021 Copa Libertadores Femenina	(Brazil) Ferroviária	(Brazil) Corinthians	3rd	2019
UEFA (Europe)	2020–21 UEFA Women's Champions League	(France) Lyon	(Spain) Barcelona	1st	—

== National leagues ==
=== UEFA ===
Nation	League	Champion	Second place	Title	Last honour
Albania	2020–21 Kategoria Superiore	Teuta	Vllaznia	2nd	1993–94
Andorra	2020–21 Primera Divisió	Inter Club d'Escaldes	Sant Julià	2nd	2019–20
Armenia	2020–21 Armenian Premier League	Alashkert	Noah	4th	2017–18
Austria	2020–21 Austrian Football Bundesliga	Red Bull Salzburg	Rapid Wien	15th	2019–20
Azerbaijan	2020–21 Azerbaijan Premier League	Neftçi Baku	Qarabağ	10th	2012–13
Belarus	2021 Belarusian Premier League	Shakhtyor Soligorsk	BATE Borisov	3rd	2020
Belgium	2020–21 Belgian First Division A	Club Brugge	Genk	17th	2019–20
Bosnia and Herzegovina	2020–21 Premier League of Bosnia and Herzegovina	Borac Banja Luka	Sarajevo	2nd	2010–11
Bulgaria	2020–21 First Professional Football League	Ludogorets	Lokomotiv Plovdiv	10th	2019–20
Croatia	2020–21 Croatian First Football League	Dinamo Zagreb	Osijek	22nd	2019–20
Cyprus	2020–21 Cypriot First Division	Omonia Nicosia	Apollon Limassol	21st	2009–10
Czech Republic	2020–21 Czech First League	Slavia Prague	Sparta Prague	20th	2019–20
Denmark	2020–21 Danish Superliga	Brøndby	Midtjylland	11th	2004–05
England	2020–21 Premier League	Manchester City	Manchester United	7th	2018–19
Estonia	2021 Meistriliiga	FCI Levadia	Flora	10th	2014
Faroe Islands	2021 Effodeildin	KÍ	HB	19th	2019
Finland	2021 Veikkausliiga	HJK	KuPS	31st	2020
France	2020–21 Ligue 1	Lille	Paris Saint-Germain	4th	2010–11
(Georgia (country)) Georgia	2021 Erovnuli Liga	Dinamo Batumi	Dinamo Tbilisi	1st	—
Germany	2020–21 Bundesliga	Bayern Munich	RB Leipzig	31st	2019–20
Gibraltar	2020–21 Gibraltar National League	Lincoln Red Imps	Europa	25th	2018–19
Greece	2020–21 Super League Greece	Olympiacos	PAOK	46th	2019–20
Hungary	2020–21 Nemzeti Bajnokság I	Ferencváros	Puskás Akadémia	32nd	2019–20
Iceland	2021 Úrvalsdeild	Víkingur Reykjavík	Breiðablik	6th	1991
(Republic of Ireland) Ireland	2021 League of Ireland Premier Division	Shamrock Rovers	St Patrick's Athletic	19th	2020
Israel	2020–21 Israeli Premier League	Maccabi Haifa	Maccabi Tel Aviv	13th	2010–11
Italy	2020–21 Serie A	Internazionale	Milan	19th	2009–10
Kazakhstan	2021 Kazakhstan Premier League	Tobol	Astana	2nd	2010
Kosovo	2020–21 Football Superleague of Kosovo	Prishtina	Drita	11th	2012–13
Latvia	2021 Latvian Higher League	RFS	Valmiera	1st	―
Lithuania	2021 A Lyga	Žalgiris	Sūduva	9th	2020
Luxembourg	2020–21 Luxembourg National Division	Fola Esch	F91 Dudelange	8th	2014–15
Malta	2020–21 Maltese Premier League	Ħamrun Spartans	Hibernians	8th	1990–91
Moldova	2020–21 Moldovan National Division	Sheriff Tiraspol	Petrocub Hîncești	19th	2019
Montenegro	2020–21 Montenegrin First League	Budućnost	Sutjeska	5th	2019–20
Netherlands	2020–21 Eredivisie	Ajax	PSV Eindhoven	35th	2018–19
North Macedonia	2020–21 Macedonian First Football League	KF Shkëndija	KF Shkupi	4th	2018–19
Northern Ireland	2020–21 NIFL Premiership	Linfield	Coleraine	55th	2019–20
Norway	2021 Eliteserien	Bodø/Glimt	Molde	2nd	2020
Poland	2020–21 Ekstraklasa	Legia Warsaw	Raków Częstochowa	15th	2019–20
Portugal	2020–21 Primeira Liga	Sporting CP	Porto	19th	2001–02
Romania	2020–21 Liga I	CFR Cluj	FCSB	7th	2019–20
Russia	2020–21 Russian Premier League	Zenit Saint Petersburg	Spartak Moscow	8th	2019–20
San Marino	2020–21 Campionato Sammarinese di Calcio	Folgore	La Fiorita	5th	2014–15
Scotland	2020–21 Scottish Premiership	Rangers	Celtic	55th	2010–11
Serbia	2020–21 Serbian SuperLiga	Red Star Belgrade	Partizan	32nd	2019–20
Slovakia	2020–21 Slovak First Football League	Slovan Bratislava	DAC Dunajská Streda	11th	2019–20
Slovenia	2020–21 Slovenian PrvaLiga	Mura	Maribor	1st	—
Spain	2020–21 La Liga	Atlético Madrid	Real Madrid	11th	2013–14
Sweden	2021 Allsvenskan	Malmö FF	AIK	25th	2020
Switzerland	2020–21 Swiss Super League	Young Boys	Basel	15th	2019–20
Turkey	2020–21 Süper Lig	Beşiktaş	Galatasaray	16th	2016–17
Ukraine	2020–21 Ukrainian Premier League	Dynamo Kyiv	Shakhtar Donetsk	16th	2015–16
Wales	2020–21 Cymru Premier	Connah's Quay Nomads	The New Saints	2nd	2019–20

=== AFC ===
Nation	League	Champion	Second place	Title	Last honour
Afghanistan	2021 Afghan Premier League				
Australia	2020–21 A-League	Melbourne City	Sydney FC	1st	—
Bahrain	2020–21 Bahraini Premier League	Al-Riffa	East Riffa	13th	2018–19
Bangladesh	2021 Bangladesh Premier League	Bashundhara Kings	Sheikh Jamal DC	2nd	2018–19
Bhutan	2021 Bhutan Premier League	Paro	Thimphu City	2nd	2019
Brunei	2021 Brunei Super League	Season Abandoned, due to the COVID-19 pandemic			
Cambodia	2021 C-League	Phnom Penh Crown	Preah Khan Reach Svay Rieng	7th	2015
China	2021 Chinese Super League	Shandong Taishan	Shanghai Port	4th	2010
Chinese Taipei	2021 Taiwan Football Premier League	Taiwan Steel	Taipower	2nd	2020
(North Korea) DPR Korea	2020–21 DPR Korea Premier Football League	Not Held			
Guam	2020–21 Guam Soccer League	Season cancelled, due to the COVID-19 pandemic			
Hong Kong	2020–21 Hong Kong Premier League	Kitchee	Eastern Long Lions	5th	2019–20
India	2020–21 I-League	Gokulam Kerala	Churchill Brothers	1st	—
India	2020–21 Indian Super League	Mumbai City	ATK Mohun Bagan	1st	—
Indonesia	2020 Liga 1	Season cancelled, due to the COVID-19 pandemic			
Iran	2020–21 Persian Gulf Pro League	Persepolis	Sepahan	14th	2019–20
Iraq	2020–21 Iraqi Premier League	Al-Quwa Al-Jawiya	Al-Zawraa	7th	2016–17
Japan	2021 J1 League	Kawasaki Frontale	Yokohama F. Marinos	4th	2020
Jordan	2021 Jordanian Pro League	Al-Ramtha	Al-Wehdat	3rd	1982
Kuwait	2020–21 Kuwaiti Premier League	Al-Arabi	Qadsia	17th	2001–02
Kyrgyzstan	2021 Kyrgyz Premier League	Dordoi Bishkek	Abdysh-Ata Kant	13th	2020
Laos	2021 Lao Premier League	Season cancelled, due to the COVID-19 pandemic			
Lebanon	2020–21 Lebanese Premier League	Al Ansar	Nejmeh	14th	2006–07
Macau	2021 Liga de Elite	Chao Pak Kei	Benfica de Macau	2nd	2019
Malaysia	2021 Malaysia Super League	Johor Darul Ta'zim	Kedah Darul Aman	8th	2020
Maldives	2020–21 Dhivehi Premier League	Maziya	Valencia	3rd	2019–20
Mongolia	2021 Mongolian National Premier League	Athletic 220	SP Falcons	2nd	2020
Myanmar	2021 Myanmar National League	Season cancelled, due to the ongoing 2021 Myanmar protests			
Nepal	2021 Nepal Super League	Kathmandu Rayzrs	Dhangadhi	1st	—
Northern Mariana Islands	2021 M*League Division 1 (Spring)	TanHoldings	All Blue (NMI U-18)	5th	2017 (Fall)
Northern Mariana Islands	2021 M*League Division 1 (Fall)	All Blue (NMI U-18)	TanHoldings	2nd	2019 (Fall)
Oman	2020–21 Oman Professional League	Season Abandoned, due to the COVID-19 pandemic			
Palestine	2020–21 West Bank Premier League	Shabab Al-Khalil	Markaz Balata	6th	2015–16
Palestine	2020–21 Gaza Strip Premier League	Shabab Rafah	Al-Ittihad Shuja'iyya	3rd	2013–14
Philippines	2021 Philippines Football League	Season cancelled, due to the COVID-19 pandemic			
Qatar	2020–21 Qatar Stars League	Al Sadd	Al-Duhail	15th	2018–19
Saudi Arabia	2020–21 Saudi Professional League	Al Hilal	Al Shabab	17th	2019–20
Singapore	2021 Singapore Premier League	Lion City Sailors	Albirex Niigata (S)	3rd	2003
South Korea	2021 K League 1	Jeonbuk Hyundai Motors	Ulsan Hyundai	9th	2020
Sri Lanka	2021 Sri Lanka Super League	Blue Star	Sea Hawks	2nd	2003–04
Syria	2020–21 Syrian Premier League	Tishreen	Al-Jaish	2nd	2019–20
Tajikistan	2021 Tajikistan Higher League	Istiklol	Khujand	10th	2020
Thailand	2020–21 Thai League 1	BG Pathum United	Buriram United	1st	—
Timor-Leste	2021 LFA Primeira	Karketu Dili	Lalenok United	2nd	2017
Turkmenistan	2021 Ýokary Liga	Altyn Asyr	Ahal	8th	2020
United Arab Emirates	2020–21 UAE Pro League	Al Jazira	Baniyas	3rd	2016–17
Uzbekistan	2021 Uzbekistan Super League	Pakhtakor	Sogdiana	14th	2020
Vietnam	2021 V.League 1	Season cancelled, due to the COVID-19 pandemic			
Yemen	2020–21 Yemeni League	Not Held			
Yemen	2021 Yemen League Division One	Fahman FC	Al-Wehda SCC (Sanaa)	1st	—

=== CAF ===
Nation	League	Champion	Second place	Title	Last honour
Algeria	2020–21 Algerian Ligue Professionnelle 1	CR Belouizdad	ES Sétif	8th	2019–20
Angola	2020–21 Girabola	Sagrada Esperança	Petróleos de Luanda	2nd	2005
Benin	2021 Benin Premier League	Loto-Popo	Les Buffles du Borgou	1st	—
Botswana	2020–21 Botswana Premier League	Season cancelled, due to the COVID-19 pandemic			
Burkina Faso	2020–21 Burkinabé Premier League	AS SONABEL	AS Douanes	1st	—
Burundi	2020–21 Burundi Premier League	Le Messager Ngozi	Kayanza United	3rd	2019–20
Cameroon	2020–21 Elite One	Coton Sport	APEJES Academy	16th	2018
Cape Verde	2021 Cape Verdean Football Championships	Season cancelled, due to the COVID-19 pandemic			
Central African Republic	2020–21 Central African Republic League	DFC8	Red Star Bangui	3rd	2015–16
Chad	2021 LINAFOOT				
Comoros	2020–21 Comoros Premier League	US de Zilimadjou	Ngazi Sport	2nd	2019–20
(Republic of the Congo) Congo	2020–21 Congo Premier League	AS Otohô	Étoile du Congo	4th	2019–20
(Democratic Republic of the Congo) DR Congo	2020–21 Linafoot	TP Mazembe	AS Maniema Union	19th	2019–20
Djibouti	2020–21 Djibouti Premier League	Arta/Solar7	Gendarmerie Nationale	1st	—
Egypt	2020–21 Egyptian Premier League	Zamalek	Al Ahly	13th	2014–15
Equatorial Guinea	2020–21 Equatoguinean Primera División	Not Held			
Eritrea	2021 Eritrean Premier League				
Eswatini	2020–21 Eswatini Premier League	Royal Leopards	Young Buffaloes	7th	2015–16
Ethiopia	2020–21 Ethiopian Premier League	Fasil Kenema	Ethiopian Coffee	1st	—
Gabon	2020–21 Gabon Championnat National D1				
(The Gambia) Gambia	2020–21 GFA League First Division	Fortune	Elite United	1st	—
Ghana	2020–21 Ghana Premier League	Hearts of Oak	Asante Kotoko	21st	2008–09
Guinea	2020–21 Guinée Championnat National	Horoya AC	CI Kamsar	18th	2018–19
Guinea-Bissau	2020–21 Campeonato Nacional da Guiné-Bissau	SC de Bissau	Sport Bissau e Benfica	14th	2006–07
Ivory Coast	2020–21 Ligue 1	ASEC Mimosas	FC San Pédro	27th	2017–18
Kenya	2020–21 FKF Premier League	Tusker	Kenya Commercial Bank	12th	2016
Lesotho	2020–21 Lesotho Premier League	Season Abandoned, due to the COVID-19 pandemic			
Liberia	2021 Liberian First Division League	LPRC Oilers	LISCR	7th	2019
Libya	2020–21 Libyan Premier League	Al-Ittihad Club (Tripoli)	Al Ahli SC (Tripoli)	17th	2009–10
Madagascar	2020–21 Malagasy Pro League	AS Adema	COSFAP Antananarivo	4th	2012
Malawi	2020–21 Super League of Malawi	Big Bullets	Silver Strikers	15th	2019
Mali	2020–21 Malian Première Division	Stade Malien	Onze Créateurs	23rd	2019–20
Mauritania	2020–21 Ligue 1 Mauritania	Nouadhibou	Tevragh-Zeina	9th	2019–20
Mauritius	2020–21 Mauritian Premier League	Grande Rivière Sud Est Wanderers	Port-Louis 2000	1st	—
Morocco	2020–21 Botola	Wydad AC	Raja Casablanca	21st	2018–19
Mozambique	2021 Moçambola	Black Bulls	Ferroviário da Beira	1st	—
Namibia	2021 Namibia Football Premier League	Not Held			
Niger	2020–21 Niger Premier League	US Gendarmerie	AS Nigelec	1st	—
Nigeria	2020–21 Nigeria Professional Football League	Akwa United	Rivers United	1st	—
Réunion	2021 Réunion Premier League	La Tamponnaise	AS Excelsior	11th	2010
Rwanda	2020–21 Rwanda Premier League	APR	Kigali	19th	2019–20
Senegal	2020–21 Senegal Premier League	Teungueth	Diambars	2nd	2019–20
Seychelles	2020–21 Seychelles First Division	Season Abandoned, due to the COVID-19 pandemic			
Sierra Leone	2021 Sierra Leone National Premier League	Bo Rangers	East End Lions	1st	—
Somalia	2020–21 Somali First Division	Horseed	Mogadishu City Club	8th	1980
South Africa	2020–21 South African Premier Division	Mamelodi Sundowns	AmaZulu	11th	2019–20
South Sudan	2021 South Sudan Football Championship	Not Held			
Sudan	2020–21 Sudan Premier League	Al-Hilal	Al-Merrikh	28th	2017
Tanzania	2020–21 Tanzanian Premier League	Simba S.C.	Young Africans SC	22nd	2019–20
Togo	2020–21 Togolese Championnat National	ASKO Kara	ASC Kara	6th	2019–20
Tunisia	2020–21 Tunisian Ligue Professionnelle 1	Espérance de Tunis	Étoile du Sahel	31st	2019–20
Uganda	2020–21 Uganda Premier League	Express	URA	7th	2011–12
Zambia	2020–21 Zambian Super League	ZESCO United	Zanaco	9th	2019
Zanzibar	2020–21 Zanzibar Premier League	KMKM	KVZ	7th	2018–19

=== CONCACAF ===
Nation	League	Champion	Second place	Title	Last honour
Anguilla	2021 AFA Senior Male League				
Antigua and Barbuda	2020–21 Antigua and Barbuda Premier Division	Not Held			
Aruba	2020–21 Aruban Division di Honor	Not Held			
(The Bahamas) Bahamas	2020–21 BFA Senior League	Not Held			
Barbados	2020–21 Barbados Premier League	Not Held			
Belize	2021 Premier League of Belize Closing	Season canceled due to the COVID-19 pandemic			
Belize	2020 Premier League of Belize Opening	Season canceled due to the COVID-19 pandemic			
Bermuda	2020–21 Bermudian Premier Division	Season canceled due to the COVID-19 pandemic			
British Virgin Islands	2020–21 BVIFA National Football League	Sugar Boys	Lion Heart	2nd	2015–16
Bonaire	2021 Bonaire League	Real Rincon	Vespo	12th	2018–19
Canada	2021 Canadian Premier League	Pacific FC	Forge FC	1st	—
Cayman Islands	2020–21 Cayman Islands Premier League	Scholars International	Bodden Town	13th	2018–19
Costa Rica	2020–21 Liga FPD–2021 Verano	Saprissa	Herediano	36th	Clausura 2020
Costa Rica	2020–21 Liga FPD–2020 Invierno	Alajuelense	Cartaginés	30th	Invierno 2013
Cuba	2020–21 Campeonato Nacional de Fútbol de Cuba	Not Held			
Curaçao	2021 Curaçao Promé Divishon	Jong Holland	Inter Willemstad	15th	2017–18
Dominica	2021 Dominica Premier League	Season canceled due to the COVID-19 pandemic			
Dominican Republic	2021 Liga Dominicana de Fútbol	Cibao FC	Atlético Vega Real	2nd	2018
El Salvador	2021 Clausura	FAS	Alianza	18th	Apertura 2009
El Salvador	2021 Apertura	Alianza	Platense	16th	Apertura 2020
French Guiana	2020–21 French Guiana Honor Division	Season abandoned due to the COVID-19 pandemic			
Guadeloupe	2020–21 Guadeloupe Division of Honor	AS Gosier	CS Moulien	2nd	2019–20
Guatemala	2021 Clausura	Santa Lucía	Comunicaciones	1st	—
Guatemala	2020 Apertura	Guastatoya	Municipal	3rd	Apertura 2018
Guyana	2021 GFF Elite League	Not Held			
Haiti	2020 Open	Violette	Arcahaie	7th	1999
Haiti	2021 Close				
Honduras	2021 Clausura	Olimpia	Motagua	33rd	Apertura 2020
Honduras	2020 Apertura	Olimpia	Marathón	32nd	Apertura 2019
Jamaica	2021 National Premier League	Cavalier	Waterhouse	2nd	1980–81
Martinique	2020–21 Martinique Championnat National	Golden Lion	Samaritaine	3rd	2015–16
Mexico	2021 Guardianes	Cruz Azul	Santos Laguna	9th	Invierno 1997
Mexico	2021 Apertura	Atlas	León	2nd	1950–51
Nicaragua	2020 Apertura	Real Estelí	Diriangén	17th	Apertura 2019
Nicaragua	2021 Clausura	Diriangén	Managua FC	27th	Clausura 2018
Panama	2021 Clausura	Tauro	Herrera	16th	Apertura 2019
Panama	2021 Apertura	Plaza Amador	UD Universitario	7th	Clausura 2016
Puerto Rico	2020–21 Liga Puerto Rico	Season canceled due to the COVID-19 pandemic			
Saint Kitts and Nevis	2021 SKNFA Premier League				
Saint Kitts and Nevis	2020–21 N1 League	Not Held			
Saint Lucia	2021 SLFA First Division	Platinum	Monchy United	3rd	2019
Saint Martin	2020–21 Ligue de Football Saint Martin	Junior Stars	Phoenicks	13th	2013–14
Saint Vincent and the Grenadines	2020–21 SVGFF Premier Division	Season abandoned due to the COVID-19 pandemic			
Sint Maarten	2020–21 SXMFF League	Flames United	SCSA Eagles	1st	—
Suriname	2020–21 SVB Topklasse	Not Held			
Trinidad and Tobago	2021 TT Pro League	Not Held			
Turks and Caicos Islands	2021 Provo Premier League	Not Held			
(United States Virgin Islands) U.S. Virgin Islands	2020–21 U.S. Virgin Islands Premier League	Not Held			
United States & Canada	2021 Major League Soccer	New York City FC	Portland Timbers	1st	—

=== CONMEBOL ===
Nation	League	Champion	Second place	Title	Last honour
Argentina	2021 Argentine Primera División	River Plate	Defensa y Justicia	37th	Final 2014
Bolivia	2021 Bolivian Primera División	Independiente Petrolero	Always Ready	1st	—
Brazil	2021 Campeonato Brasileiro Série A	Atlético Mineiro	Flamengo	2nd	1971
Chile	2021 Chilean Primera División	Universidad Católica	Colo-Colo	16th	2020
Colombia	2021 Categoría Primera A Apertura	Deportes Tolima	Millonarios	3rd	Apertura 2018
Colombia	2021 Categoría Primera A Finalización	Deportivo Cali	Deportes Tolima	10th	Apertura 2015
Ecuador	2021 Ecuadorian Serie A	Independiente del Valle	Emelec	1st	—
Paraguay	2021 Paraguayan Primera División Apertura	Libertad	Olimpia	21st	Apertura 2017
Paraguay	2021 Paraguayan Primera División Clausura	Cerro Porteño	Guaraní	34th	Apertura 2020
Peru	2021 Peruvian Liga 1	Alianza Lima	Sporting Cristal	24th	2017
Uruguay	2021 Uruguayan Primera División	Peñarol	Nacional	51st	2018
Venezuela	2021 Venezuelan Primera División	Deportivo Táchira	Caracas	9th	2014–15

=== OFC ===
Nation	League	Champion	Second place	Title	Last honour
Cook Islands	2021 Cook Islands Round Cup	Nikao Sokattak	Tupapa Maraerenga	7th	2009
Fiji	2021 Fiji Premier League	Lautoka	Rewa	6th	2018
Kiribati	2021 Kiribati National Championship	Not Held			
New Caledonia	2021 New Caledonia Super Ligue	Hienghène Sport	Ne Drehu	3rd	2019
New Zealand	2021 New Zealand National League	Season cancelled, due to the COVID-19 pandemic (Note: With four teams in the National League Championships unable to play, New Zealand Football took the decision to cancel the Championship phase and not crown national champions. Instead, a new one-off interregional competition, the National League: South Central Series, was held in its place for the teams that were able to play.)			
New Zealand	2020–21 New Zealand Football Championship	Team Wellington	Auckland City	3rd	2016–17
Papua New Guinea	2021 Papua New Guinea National Soccer League	Season Abandoned, due to the COVID-19 pandemic			
Niue	2021 Niue Soccer Tournament	Vaiea	Vaiea II	5th	2015
American Samoa	2021 FFAS Senior League	Vaiala Tongan	Pago Youth	1st	—
Samoa	2021 Samoa National League	Lupe o le Soaga	Vaipuna	7th	2020
Solomon Islands	2021 Solomon Islands S-League	Central Coast	Solomon Warriors	1st	—
(French Polynesia) Tahiti	2020–21 Tahiti Ligue 1	AS Pirae	AS Vénus	10th	2019–20
Tonga	2021 Tonga Major League	Veitongo	Popua	6th	2019
Tuvalu	2021 Tuvalu A-Division	Tofaga	Nauti	1st	—
Vanuatu	2021 VFF Champions League	ABM Galaxy	Rue Rue	2nd	2020
Vanuatu	2020–21 Port Vila Premier League	ABM Galaxy	Tafea	1st	—

=== Non-FIFA ===
Nation	League	Champion	Second place	Title	Last honour
(Autonomous Republic of Crimea) Crimea	2020–21 Crimean Premier League	FC Sevastopol	Gvardeyets Gvardeyskoye	2nd	2016–17
Gozo	2020–21 Gozo Football League First Division	Season Abandoned, due to the COVID-19 pandemic			
Greenland	2021 Greenlandic Football Championship	Not Held			
Isle of Man	2021 Isle of Man Premier League	Corinthians	Rushen United	1st	—
Mayotte	2021 Mayotte Division Honneur	AS Jumeaux	FC Mtsapéré	1st	—
Northern Cyprus	2020–21 KTFF Süper Lig	Not Held			
Saint Barthélemy	2021 ligue de football Saint-Barthélemy	Team FWI	Arawak FC	1st	—
Saint Pierre and Miquelon	2021 Ligue de Football de Saint Pierre et Miquelon	Miquelonnaise	Saint Pierraise	5th	2020
Orkney	2021 Orkney Amateur Football League	Kirkwall Hotspurs	Stromness	10th	2019
Saint Helena	2021 SHFA League	Wirebirds	Rovers	6th	2013
Scilly Islands	2021 Scilly Islands Football League	Woolpack Wanderers	Garrison Gunners	7th	2013
Tibet	2021 Tibetan Champions League				
Vatican City	2021 Vatican City Championship	Not Held			

== Domestic cups ==
=== UEFA ===
Nation	Tournament	Champion	Final score	Second place	Title	Last honour
Albania	2020–21 Albanian Cup	Vllaznia	1–0	Skënderbeu	7th	2007–08
Albania	2021 Albanian Supercup	Teuta	3–0	Vllaznia	2nd	2020
Andorra	2021 Copa Constitució	Sant Julià	2–1	Atlètic Club d'Escaldes	6th	2015
Andorra	2021 Andorran Supercup	Inter Club d'Escaldes	2–1	Sant Julià	2nd	2020
Armenia	2020–21 Armenian Cup	Ararat Yerevan	3–1	Alashkert	6th	2008
Austria	2020–21 Austrian Cup	Red Bull Salzburg	3–0	LASK	8th	2019–20
Azerbaijan	2020–21 Azerbaijan Cup	Keşla	2–1	Sumgayit	2nd	2017–18
Belarus	2020–21 Belarusian Cup	BATE Borisov	2–1	Isloch Minsk Raion	5th	2019–20
Belarus	2021 Belarusian Super Cup	Shakhtyor Soligorsk	0–0 (5–4 p)	BATE Borisov	1st	—
Belgium	2020–21 Belgian Cup	Genk	2–1	Standard Liège	7th	2012–13
Belgium	2021 Belgian Super Cup	Club Brugge	3–2	Genk	16th	2018
Bosnia and Herzegovina	2020–21 Bosnia and Herzegovina Cup	Sarajevo	0–0 (4–1 p)	Borac Banja Luka	7th	2018–19
Bulgaria	2020–21 Bulgarian Cup	CSKA Sofia	1–0	Arda Kardzhali	21st	2015–16
Bulgaria	2021 Bulgarian Supercup	Ludogorets Razgrad	4–0	CSKA Sofia	5th	2019
Croatia	2020–21 Croatian Football Cup	Dinamo Zagreb	6–3	Istra 1961	16th	2017–18
Cyprus	2020–21 Cypriot Cup	Anorthosis Famagusta	2–1	Olympiakos Nicosia	11th	2007–08
Cyprus	2021 Cypriot Super Cup	AC Omonia	1–1 (3–2 p)	Anorthosis Famagusta	17th	2012
Czech Republic	2020–21 Czech Cup	Slavia Prague	1–0	Viktoria Plzeň	7th	2019–20
Denmark	2020–21 Danish Cup	Randers	4–0	SønderjyskE	2nd	2005–06
England	2020–21 FA Cup	Leicester City	1–0	Chelsea	1st	—
England	2021 FA Community Shield	Leicester City	1–0	Manchester City	2nd	1971
England	2020–21 EFL Cup	Manchester City	1–0	Tottenham Hotspur	8th	2019–20
Estonia	2020–21 Estonian Cup	Levadia	1–0	Flora	10th	2017–18
Estonia	2021 Estonian Supercup	Flora	1–0	Paide	11th	2020
Faroe Islands	2021 Faroe Islands Cup	B36 Tórshavn	1–1 (4–3 p)	NSÍ Runavík	7th	2018
Faroe Islands	2021 Faroe Islands Super Cup	HB Tórshavn	3–1	NSÍ Runavík	5th	2019
Finland	2021 Finnish Cup	KuPS	0–0 (5–4 p)	HJK	3rd	1989
France	2020–21 Coupe de France	Paris Saint-Germain	2–0	Monaco	14th	2019–20
France	2021 Trophée des Champions	Lille	1–0	Paris Saint-Germain	1st	—
(Georgia (country)) Georgia	2021 Georgian Cup	Saburtalo Tbilisi	1–0	Samgurali	2nd	2019
(Georgia (country)) Georgia	2021 Georgian Super Cup	Dinamo Tbilisi	2–2 (5–4 p)	Gagra	8th	2015
Germany	2020–21 DFB-Pokal	Borussia Dortmund	4–1	RB Leipzig	5th	2016–17
Germany	2021 DFL-Supercup	Bayern Munich	3–1	Borussia Dortmund	9th	2020
Gibraltar	2021 Rock Cup	Lincoln Red Imps	2–0	Glacis United	18th	2016
Gibraltar	2021 Pepe Reyes Cup	Europa	3–1	Lincoln Red Imps	4th	2019
Greece	2020–21 Greek Football Cup	PAOK	2–1	Olympiacos	8th	2018–19
Hungary	2020–21 Magyar Kupa	Újpest	1–0 (a.e.t.)	Fehérvár	11th	2017–18
Iceland	2021 Icelandic Cup	Víkingur	3–0	ÍA	3rd	2019
Iceland	2021 Icelandic Men's Football Super Cup	Tournament cancelled, due to the COVID-19 pandemic				
(Republic of Ireland) Ireland	2021 FAI Cup	St Patrick's Athletic	1–1 (4–3 p)	Bohemians	4th	2014
(Republic of Ireland) Ireland	2021 President of Ireland's Cup	Dundalk	1–1 (4–3 p)	Shamrock Rovers	3rd	2019
Israel	2020–21 Israel State Cup	Maccabi Tel Aviv	2–1	Hapoel Tel Aviv	24th	2014–15
Israel	2020–21 Toto Cup Al	Maccabi Tel Aviv	2–0	Bnei Sakhnin	7th	2018–19
Israel	2021 Israel Super Cup	Maccabi Haifa	2–0	Maccabi Tel Aviv	4th	1989
Italy	2020–21 Coppa Italia	Juventus	2–1	Atalanta	14th	2017–18
Italy	2021 Supercoppa Italiana	Internazionale	2–1	Juventus	6th	2010
Kazakhstan	2021 Kazakhstan Cup	Kairat	3–3 (9–8 p)	Shakhter Karagandy	10th	2018
Kazakhstan	2021 Kazakhstan Super Cup	Tobol	1–1 (5–4 p)	Astana	1st	—
Kosovo	2020–21 Kosovar Cup	KF Llapi	1–1 (a.e.t.) (4–3 p)	KF Dukagjini	1st	—
Kosovo	2021 Kosovar Supercup	KF Llapi	3–1 (a.e.t.)	Prishtina	1st	—
Latvia	2021 Latvian Football Cup	RFS	1–0	Liepāja	2nd	2019
Liechtenstein	2020–21 Liechtenstein Cup	Tournament cancelled, due to the COVID-19 pandemic				
Lithuania	2021 Lithuanian Football Cup	Žalgiris	5–1	Panevėžys	13th	2018
Lithuania	2021 Lithuanian Supercup	Panevėžys	2–2 (3–2 p)	Žalgiris	1st	—
Luxembourg	2020–21 Luxembourg Cup	Tournament cancelled, due to the COVID-19 pandemic				
Malta	2020–21 Maltese FA Trophy	Tournament cancelled, due to the COVID-19 pandemic				
Moldova	2020–21 Moldovan Cup	Sfântul Gheorghe	0–0 (3–2 p)	Sheriff Tiraspol	1st	—
Moldova	2021 Moldovan Super Cup	Sfântul Gheorghe	2–2 (4–2 p)	Sheriff Tiraspol	1st	—
Montenegro	2020–21 Montenegrin Cup	Budućnost	3–1	Dečić	3rd	2018–19
Netherlands	2020–21 KNVB Cup	Ajax	2–1	Vitesse	20th	2018–19
Netherlands	2021 Johan Cruyff Shield	PSV Eindhoven	4–0	Ajax	12th	2016
North Macedonia	2020–21 Macedonian Football Cup	Sileks	0–0 (4–3 p)	Akademija Pandev	3rd	1996–97
Northern Ireland	2020–21 Irish Cup	Linfield	2–1	Larne	44th	2016–17
Northern Ireland	2020–21 NIFL Cup	Tournament cancelled, due to the COVID-19 pandemic				
Poland	2020–21 Polish Cup	Raków Częstochowa	2–1	Arka Gdynia	1st	—
Poland	2021 Polish Super Cup	Raków Częstochowa	1–1 (4–3 p)	Legia Warsaw	1st	—
Portugal	2020–21 Taça de Portugal	Braga	2–0	Benfica	3rd	2015–16
Portugal	2020–21 Taça da Liga	Sporting CP	1–0	Braga	3rd	2018–19
Portugal	2021 Supertaça Cândido de Oliveira	Sporting CP	2–1	Braga	9th	2015
Romania	2020–21 Cupa României	Universitatea Craiova	3–2	Astra Giurgiu	8th	2017–18
Romania	2021 Supercupa României	Universitatea Craiova	0–0 (4–2 p)	CFR Cluj	1st	—
Russia	2020–21 Russian Cup	Lokomotiv Moscow	3–1	Krylia Sovetov Samara	11th	2018–19
Russia	2021 Russian Super Cup	Zenit Saint Petersburg	3–0	Lokomotiv Moscow	7th	2020
San Marino	2020–21 Coppa Titano	La Fiorita	0–0 (10–9 p)	Tre Fiori	6th	2017–18
San Marino	2021 Super Coppa Sammarinese	La Fiorita	3–2	Folgore	3rd	2018
Scotland	2020–21 Scottish Cup	St Johnstone	1–0	Hibernian	2nd	2013–14
Scotland	2020–21 Scottish League Cup	St Johnstone	1–0	Livingston	1st	—
Serbia	2020–21 Serbian Cup	Red Star Belgrade	0–0 (4–3 p)	Partizan	4th	2011–12
Slovakia	2020–21 Slovak Cup	Slovan Bratislava	2–1	Žilina	17th	2019–20
Slovenia	2020–21 Slovenian Cup	Olimpija Ljubljana	2–1	Celje	3rd	2018–19
Spain	2020–21 Copa del Rey	Barcelona	4–0	Athletic Bilbao	31st	2018
Spain	2020–21 Supercopa de España	Athletic Bilbao	3–2 (a.e.t.)	Barcelona	3rd	2015
Sweden	2020–21 Svenska Cupen	Hammarby	0–0 (5–4 p)	BK Häcken	1st	—
Switzerland	2020–21 Swiss Cup	Luzern	3–1	St. Gallen	3rd	1991–92
Turkey	2020–21 Turkish Cup	Beşiktaş	2–0	Antalyaspor	10th	2010–11
Turkey	2021 Turkish Super Cup	Beşiktaş	1–1 (4–2 p)	Antalyaspor	9th	2006
Ukraine	2020–21 Ukrainian Cup	Dynamo Kyiv	1–0 (a.e.t.)	Zorya Luhansk	13th	2019–20
Ukraine	2021 Ukrainian Super Cup	Shakhtar Donetsk	3–0	Dynamo Kyiv	9th	2017
Wales	2020–21 Welsh Cup	Tournament cancelled, due to the COVID-19 pandemic				
Wales	2020–21 Welsh League Cup	Tournament cancelled, due to the COVID-19 pandemic				

=== AFC ===
Nation	Tournament	Champion	Final score	Second place	Title	Last honour
Australia	2021 FFA Cup	Melbourne Victory	2–1	Central Coast Mariners	2nd	2015
Bahrain	2020–21 Bahraini King's Cup	Riffa	2–0	Al-Ahli (Manama)	7th	2019
Bahrain	2020–21 Bahraini FA Cup	Al-Muharraq	2–1	East Riffa	5th	2019–20
Bangladesh	2020–21 Bangladesh Federation Cup	Bashundhara Kings	1–0	Saif	2nd	2019–20
Brunei	2021 Brunei FA Cup					
Brunei	2021 Brunei Super Cup					
Cambodia	2021 Hun Sen Cup	Visakha	2–2 (5–4 p)	Preah Khan Reach	2nd	2020
China	2021 Chinese FA Cup	Shandong Taishan	1–0	Shanghai Port	7th	2020
China	2021 Chinese FA Super Cup	Tournament cancelled				
Guam	2021 Guam FA Cup					
Hong Kong	2020–21 Hong Kong FA Cup	Tournament cancelled, due to the COVID-19 pandemic				
Hong Kong	2020–21 Sapling Cup	Eastern	2–0	Happy Valley	1st	—
Hong Kong	2020–21 Hong Kong Senior Challenge Shield	Tournament cancelled, due to the COVID-19 pandemic				
India	2021 Durand Cup	Goa	1–0 (a.e.t.)	Mohammedan	1st	—
India	2021 Indian Super Cup	Tournament cancelled				
Indonesia	2021 Piala Indonesia	Not Held				
Indonesia	2021 Menpora Cup	Persija Jakarta	4–1	Persib Bandung	1st	—
Iran	2021 Hazfi Cup	Foolad	0–0 (4–2 p)	Esteghlal	1st	—
Iran	2021 Iranian Super Cup	Foolad	1–0	Persepolis	1st	—
Iraq	2020–21 Iraq FA Cup	Al-Quwa Al-Jawiya	0–0 (4–2 p)	Al-Zawraa	5th	2015–16
Iraq	2021 Iraqi Super Cup	Al-Zawraa	1–0	Al-Quwa Al-Jawiya	5th	2017
Japan	2021 Emperor's Cup (Note: The Emperor's Cup final is traditionally held on 1 January of the next calendar year.)	Urawa Red Diamonds	2–1	Oita Trinita	8th	2018
Japan	2021 J.League Cup	Nagoya Grampus	2–0	Cerezo Osaka	1st	—
Japan	2021 Japanese Super Cup	Kawasaki Frontale	3–2	Gamba Osaka	2nd	2019
Jordan	2021 Jordan FA Cup	Al-Faisaly	1–0	Al-Salt	21st	2018–19
Jordan	2021 Jordan FA Shield	Al-Jalil	1–1 (6–5 p)	Al-Wehdat	1st	—
Jordan	2021 Jordan Super Cup	Al-Wehdat	2–0	Al-Jazeera	14th	2018
Kuwait	2020–21 Kuwait Emir Cup	Kuwait	1–0	Qadsia	15th	2018–19
Kuwait	2020–21 Kuwait Crown Prince Cup	Kuwait	2–1	Qadsia	9th	2019–20
Kuwait	2020–21 Kuwait Federation Cup	Not Held				
Kyrgyzstan	2021 Kyrgyzstan Cup	Neftchi Kochkor-Ata	0–0 (4–3 p)	Alga Bishkek	2nd	2019
Kyrgyzstan	2021 Kyrgyzstan Super Cup	Dordoi Bishkek	3–1 (a.e.t.)	Alay	5th	2019
Laos	2021 Lao FF Cup	Not Held				
Lebanon	2020–21 Lebanese FA Cup	Al Ansar	1–1 (3–1 p)	Nejmeh	15th	2016–17
Lebanon	2021 Lebanese Elite Cup	Nejmeh	3–3 (5–4 p)	Al Ahed	12th	2018
Lebanon	2021 Lebanese Challenge Cup	Bourj	4–2	Tripoli	2nd	2019
Lebanon	2021 Lebanese Super Cup	Al Ansar	2–2 (5–4 p)	Nejmeh	6th	2012
Macau	2021 Taça de Macau	Chao Pak Kei	0–0 (6–5 p)	Cheng Fung	2nd	2018
Malaysia	2021 Piala Sumbangsih	Johor Darul Ta'zim	2–0	Kedah	6th	2020
Malaysia	2021 Malaysia FA Cup	Not Held				
Malaysia	2021 Malaysia Cup	Kuala Lumpur City	2–0	Johor Darul Ta'zim	4th	1989
Malaysia	2021 Malaysia Challenge Cup	Tournament cancelled, due to the COVID-19 pandemic				
Maldives	2021 Maldives FA Cup	Not Held				
Maldives	2021 Maldivian FA Charity Shield	Maziya	5–0	Valencia	4th	2017
Mongolia	2021 MFF Tsom Cup					
Mongolia	2021 MFF Super Cup	FC Ulaanbaatar	2–0	Athletic 220	1st	—
Myanmar	2021 MFF Charity Cup	Season cancelled, due to the ongoing 2021 Myanmar protests				
North Korea	2021 Hwaebul Cup					
Oman	2020–21 Sultan Qaboos Cup	Dhofar	5–1	Suwaiq	10th	2019–20
Oman	2021 Oman Super Cup					
Pakistan	2021 PFF National Challenge Cup					
Palestine	2020–21 Palestine Cup					
Philippines	2021 Copa Paulino Alcantara	Kaya–Iloilo	1–0	ADT	2nd	2018
Qatar	2021 Emir of Qatar Cup	Al Sadd	1–1 (5–4 p)	Al-Rayyan	18th	2020
Qatar	2021 Qatar Cup	Al Sadd	2–0	Al-Duhail	8th	2020
Qatar	2020–21 Qatari Stars Cup	Al-Sailiya	1–0	Al-Markhiya	1st	—
Qatar	2021 Qatari Sheikh Jassim Cup					
Saudi Arabia	2020–21 King Cup	Al Faisaly	3–2	Al Taawoun	1st	—
Saudi Arabia	2021 Saudi Super Cup	Al Hilal	2–2 (4–3 p)	Al Faisaly	3rd	2018
Singapore	2021 Singapore Cup	Tournament cancelled, due to the COVID-19 pandemic				
Singapore	2021 Singapore Community Shield					
South Korea	2021 Korean FA Cup	Jeonnam Dragons	4–4 (a)	Daegu	4th	2007
Sri Lanka	2021 Sri Lanka FA Cup					
Syria	2020–21 Syrian Cup	Jableh	0–0 (a.e.t.) (6–5 p)	Hutteen Latakia	2nd	1999
Syria	2021 Syrian Super Cup					
Tajikistan	2021 Tajikistan Cup	Khujand	2–0 (a.e.t.)	Istiklol	5th	2017
Tajikistan	2021 TFF Cup	Istiklol	1–0	Khatlon	6th	2019
Tajikistan	2021 Tajik Super Cup	Istiklol	2–0	Ravshan	10th	2020
Thailand	2020–21 Thai FA Cup	Chiangrai United	1–1 (4–3 p)	Chonburi	3rd	2018
Thailand	2021 Thailand Champions Cup	BG Pathum United	1–0	Chiangrai United	1st	—
Timor-Leste	2021 Taça 12 de Novembro					
Timor-Leste	2021 LFA Super Taça					
Turkmenistan	2021 Turkmenistan Cup	Şagadam FK	1–0	Ahal FK	2nd	2007
Turkmenistan	2021 Turkmenistan Super Cup	Altyn Asyr FK	2–0	FK Köpetdag Aşgabat	7th	2020
United Arab Emirates	2020–21 UAE President's Cup	Shabab Al Ahli	2–1	Al-Nasr	10th	2018–19
United Arab Emirates	2020–21 UAE League Cup	Shabab Al Ahli	0–0 (5–4 p)	Al-Nasr	2nd	2018–19
United Arab Emirates	2021 UAE Super Cup	Al Jazira	1–1 (5–3 p)	Shabab Al Ahli	1st	—
Uzbekistan	2021 Uzbekistan Cup	Nasaf	2–1	Pakhtakor	2nd	2015
Uzbekistan	2021 Uzbekistan Super Cup	Pakhtakor Tashkent	1–0	Nasaf	1st	—
Vietnam	2021 Vietnamese Cup	Tournament cancelled, due to the COVID-19 pandemic				
Vietnam	2021 Vietnamese Super Cup					

=== CAF ===
Nation	Tournament	Champion	Final score	Second place	Title	Last honour
Algeria	2020–21 Algerian League Cup	JS Kabylie	2–2 (4–1 p)	NC Magra	1st	—
Angola	2020–21 Angola Cup	Atlético Petróleos de Luanda	2–0	Interclube	12th	2017
Angola	2021 Angola Super Cup	Sagrada Esperança	0–0 (4–3 p)	Atlético Petróleos de Luanda	1st	—
Botswana	2020–21 FA Challenge Cup					
Botswana	2020–21 Mascom Top 8 Cup					
Burkina Faso	2021 Coupe du Faso	ASFA Yennenga	1–0	ASF Bobo Dioulasso	5th	2013
Burkina Faso	2021 Burkinabé SuperCup	AS SONABEL	2–1	ASFA Yennenga	1st	—
Burundi	2021 Coupe du Président de la République	Bumamuru FC	3–1	Flambeau du Centre	1st	—
Burundi	2021 Coupe de l'Unité	Flambeau du Centre	1–0	Rukinzo	1st	—
Cameroon	2021 Cameroonian Cup					
Cameroon	2021 Super Coupe Roger Milla					
Cape Verde	2021 Taça Nacional de Cabo Verde					
Cape Verde	2021 Cape Verdean Independence Cup					
Cape Verde	2021 Supertaça de Cabo Verde					
Central African Republic	2021 Central African Republic Coupe Nationale	Castel Foot	2–1	Olympic Real de Bangui	1st	—
Comoros	2021 Comoros Cup	Olympique de Messira	3–1	Ouani	1st	—
Djibouti	2020–21 Djibouti Cup	AS Arta/Solar7	0–0 (4–3 p)	Dikhil/SGDT	3rd	2019–20
Djibouti	2021 Djibouti Super Cup					
(Democratic Republic of the Congo) DR Congo	2021 Coupe du Congo	DC Motema Pembe	1–0	SM Sanga Balende	14th	2010
Egypt	2020–21 Egypt Cup					
Egypt	2020–21 Egyptian Super Cup	Tala'ea El Gaish	0–0 (3–2 p)	Al Ahly	1st	—
Equatorial Guinea	2021 Equatoguinean Cup					
Eswatini	2021 Swazi Cup					
Ethiopia	2021 Ethiopian Cup					
Ethiopia	2021 Ethiopian Super Cup					
Ghana	2021 Ghanaian FA Cup	Accra Hearts of Oak	0–0 (8–7 p)	Ashanti Gold	11th	2000
Guinea-Bissau	2021 Taça Nacional da Guiné Bissau	Sport Bissau e Benfica	2–0	Cantchungo FC	9th	2018
Ivory Coast	2021 Coupe de Côte d'Ivoire					
Kenya	2021 FKF President's Cup	Gor Mahia	0–0 (4–1 p)	A.F.C. Leopards	9th	2012
Kenya	2021 FKF Super Cup	Tusker	1–1 (8–7 p)	Gor Mahia	3rd	2013 (post-season)
Liberia	2021 Liberian FA Cup	Monrovia Club Breweries	2–1	Watanga FC	3rd	2016
Liberia	2021 Liberian Super Cup	LPRC Oilers	4–0	Monrovia Club Breweries	2nd	2002
Madagascar	2021 Coupe de Madagascar	CFFA	3–1	CS-DFC	1st	—
Malawi	2021 FDH Bank Knockout Cup	Silver Strikers FC	2–0	Ekwendeni Hammers	3rd	2014
Mali	2021 Malian Cup	Stade Malien	3–2	Binga FC	20th	2018
Mauritania	2021 Mauritanian President's Cup	ASAC Concorde	0–0 (6–5 p)	Tevragh-Zeina	2nd	2009
Mauritius	2021 Mauritian Cup	Tournament cancelled, due to the COVID-19 pandemic				
Mauritius	2020-21 Mauritian Republic Cup	Tournament cancelled, due to the COVID-19 pandemic				
Morocco	2021 Moroccan Throne Cup					
Mozambique	2021 Taça de Moçambique	Not Held				
Niger	2021 Niger Cup	US GN	1–1 (4–3 p)	AS Police (Niamey)	1st	—
Nigeria	2021 Aiteo Cup	Bayelsa United	2–2 (4–3 p)	Nasarawa United	1st	—
Rwanda	2021 Rwandan Cup					
Senegal	2021 Senegal FA Cup	Casa Sports	1–0	Diambars FC	3rd	2011
Senegal	2021 Senegalese League Cup	Tournament cancelled, due to the COVID-19 pandemic				
Seychelles	2021 Seychelles FA Cup					
Seychelles	2021 Seychelles Presidents Cup					
Somalia	2021 Somalia Cup					
South Africa	2020–21 Nedbank Cup	Tshakhuma	1–0	Chippa United	1st	—
South Africa	2021 MTN 8	Mamelodi Sundowns	1–1 (3–2 p)	Cape Town City	4th	2007
South Sudan	2021 South Sudan National Cup	Atlabara FC	2–0	Al-Salam FC	1st	—
Sudan	2020–21 Sudan Cup					
Tanzania	2020–21 Tanzania FA Cup	Simba S.C.	1–0	Young Africans S.C.	4th	2019–20
Tanzania	2021 Tanzania Community Shield	Young Africans S.C.	1–0	Simba S.C.	6th	2015
Togo	2021 Coupe du Togo					
Togo	2021 Supercoupe du Togo	ASKO Kara	1–0	Kakadl FC	5th	1995
Tunisia	2020–21 Tunisian Cup	CS Sfaxien	0–0 (5–4 p)	Club Africain	6th	2018–19
Tunisia	2021 Tunisian Super Cup	ES Tunis	1–0	CS Sfaxien	6th	2020
Uganda	2021 Uganda Cup	Vipers SC	8–1	Bul FC	2nd	2016
Zambia	2021 Zambian ABSA Cup	Lusaka Dynamos	0–0 (3–1 p)	ZESCO United	1st	—
Zambia	2021 Zambian Charity Shield	ZESCO United	3–0	Lusaka Dynamos	5th	2017
Zanzibar	2021 Zanzibar FA Cup	Mafunzo F.C.	1–1 (4–3 p)	KVZ	1st	—
Zimbabwe	2021 Chibuku Cup	F.C. Platinum	0–0 (5–3 p)	Ngezi Platinum F.C.	1st	—
Zimbabwe	2021 Zimbabwean Charity Shield					

=== CONCACAF ===
Nation	Tournament	Champion	Final score	Second place	Title	Last honour
Aruba	2020–21 Torneo Copa Betico Croes	Racing Club Aruba	7–0	La Fama	4th	2019–20
Barbados	2021 Barbados FA Cup					
Barbados	2021 Capellisport Super Cup					
Bermuda	2021 Bermuda FA Cup	Tournament cancelled, due to the COVID-19 pandemic				
Bermuda	2020–21 Friendship Trophy	Tournament cancelled, due to the COVID-19 pandemic				
Canada	2021 Canadian Championship	CF Montréal	1–0	Toronto FC	1st	—
Cayman Islands	2020–21 Cayman Islands FA Cup	Bodden Town	1–1 (5–4 p)	Academy SC	5th	2016–17
Cayman Islands	2020–21 Cayman Islands President's Cup	Latinos	3–0	Bodden Town	2nd	2019–20
Costa Rica	2021 Costa Rica Super Cup	Deportivo Saprissa	4–1	Alajuelense	3rd	1976
Dominica	2021 Dominica Nations Cup	South East	2–1	Bath Estate	1st	—
El Salvador	2020–21 Copa El Salvador					
Grenada	2021 GFA Super Knockout Cup					
Guadeloupe	2021 Coupe de Guadeloupe					
Guatemala	2020–21 Copa de Guatemala					
Mexico	2020–21 Copa MX	Tournament cancelled, due to the COVID-19 pandemic				
Mexico	2021 Supercopa MX					
Mexico	2021 Campeón de Campeones	Cruz Azul	2–1	León	3rd	1974
Nicaragua	2021 Copa de Nicaragua	Walter Ferretti	3–1	Real Madriz	1st	—
Saint Kitts and Nevis	2020–21 Saint Kitts and Nevis National Cup					
Suriname	2020–21 SVB Cup					
Suriname	2021 Suriname President's Cup					
Turks and Caicos Islands	2021 Turks Head Cup	SWA Sharks FC	3–0	Beaches FC	1st	—
United States	2021 U.S. Open Cup	Tournament cancelled, due to the COVID-19 pandemic				

=== CONMEBOL ===
Nation	Tournament	Champion	Final score	Second place	Title	Last honour
Argentina	2019–20 Copa Argentina	Boca Juniors	0–0 (5–4 p)	Talleres (C)	4th	2014–15
Argentina	2021 Supercopa Argentina					
Argentina	2021 Copa de la Liga Profesional	Colón	3–0	Racing	1st	—
Bolivia	2021 Copa Simón Bolívar	Universitario de Vinto	3–2	Universitario de Sucre	1st	—
Brazil	2021 Copa do Brasil	Atlético Mineiro	6–1	Athletico Paranaense	2nd	2014
Brazil	2021 Supercopa do Brasil	Flamengo	2–2 (6–5 p)	Palmeiras	2nd	2020
Chile	2021 Copa Chile	Colo-Colo	2–0	Everton	13th	2019
Colombia	2021 Copa Colombia	Atlético Nacional	5–1	Deportivo Pereira	5th	2018
Colombia	2021 Superliga Colombiana	Santa Fe	5–3	América de Cali	4th	2017
Ecuador	2021 Copa Ecuador	Tournament cancelled, due to the COVID-19 pandemic				
Ecuador	2021 Supercopa Ecuador	L.D.U. Quito	1–0	Barcelona	2nd	2020
Paraguay	2021 Copa Paraguay	Olimpia	2–2 (3–1 p)	Sol de América	1st	—
Paraguay	2021 Supercopa Paraguay	Olimpia	3–1	Cerro Porteño	1st	—
Peru	2021 Copa Bicentenario	Sporting Cristal	2–1	Carlos A. Mannucci	1st	—
Peru	2021 Supercopa Peruana	Tournament cancelled, due to the COVID-19 pandemic				
Uruguay	2021 Supercopa Uruguaya	Nacional	2–0	Montevideo Wanderers	2nd	2019
Venezuela	2021 Copa Venezuela	Not held				

=== OFC ===
Nation	Tournament	Champion	Final score	Second place	Title	Last honour
Cook Islands	2021 Cook Islands Cup	Nikao Sokattak	3–0	Tupapa Maraerenga	11th	2020
Fiji	2021 Fiji Interdistrict Championship					
New Caledonia	2021 Coupe de Calédonie	Tournament Abandoned, due to the COVID-19 pandemic				
New Zealand	2021 Chatham Cup	Cashmere Technical	4–2	Miramar Rangers	4th	2014
(French Polynesia) Tahiti	2021 Tahiti Cup	A.S. Vénus	2–1	A.S. Pirae	8th	2019
Tonga	2021 Tonga Cup					
Tuvalu	2021 NBT Cup	Tofaga	4–3	Lakena United	7th	2019
Tuvalu	2021 Tuvalu Independence Cup	Nanumaga	2–2 (4–3 p)	Funafuti	1st	—
Tuvalu	2021 Christmas Cup	Nauti	bt	Tofaga	3rd	2020

=== Non-FIFA ===
Nation	Tournament	Champion	Final score	Second place	Title	Last honour
Channel Islands	2020–21 Guernsey FA Cup	Sylvans	3–2	St. Martins	2nd	2006–07
(Autonomous Republic of Crimea) Crimea	2021 Crimean Football Union Cup	Yevpatoria	2–1	Gvardeyets Skvortsovo	1st	—
Gozo	2020–21 G.F.A. Cup					
Isle of Man	2020–21 Isle of Man FA Cup	Corinthians	7–1	Ramsey	1st	—
Northern Cyprus	2021 Cypriot Cup	Not held				
Orkney	2021 Parish Cup	Holm	1–1 (9–8 p)	Stromness		
Saint Helena	2021 Knockout Cup	Rovers	2–1	Wirebirds	1st	—
Scilly Islands	2021 Scilly Islands Charity Shield					
Tibet	2021 GCMGC Gold Cup					
Vatican City	2021 Clericus Cup					

== Women's leagues ==
=== UEFA ===
Nation	League	Champion	Second place	Title	Last honour
Albania	2020–21 Albanian Women's National Championship	Vllaznia	Apolonia	8th	2019–20
Austria	2020–21 ÖFB-Frauenliga	St. Pölten	Landhaus Wien	6th	2018–19
Belarus	2021 Belarusian Premier League	Dinamo-BGU	FC Minsk	1st	—
Belgium	2020–21 Belgian Women's Super League	RSC Anderlecht	Oud-Heverlee	7th	2019–20
Bosnia and Herzegovina	2020–21 Bosnia and Herzegovina Women's Premier League	SFK 2000	Emina Mostar	19th	2019–20
Bulgaria	2020–21 Bulgarian women's football championship	NSA Sofia	Lokomotiv Plovdiv	18th	2019–20
Croatia	2020–21 Croatian Women's First Football League	Osijek	Split	23rd	2017–18
Cyprus	2020–21 Cypriot First Division	Apollon Limassol	Nea Salamis Famagusta	11th	2018–19
Czech Republic	2020–21 Czech First Division	Sparta Prague	Slavia Prague	21st	2018–19
Denmark	2020–21 Danish Women's League	HB Køge	Brøndby IF	1st	—
England	2020–21 FA WSL	Chelsea	Manchester City	4th	2019–20
Estonia	2021 Naiste Meistriliiga	Flora	Saku Sporting	4th	2020
Faroe Islands	2021 1. deild kvinnur	KÍ	NSÍ Runavík	21st	2020
Finland	2021 Kansallinen Liiga	KuPS	TiPS	1st	—
France	2020–21 Division 1 Féminine	Paris Saint-Germain	Lyon	1st	—
(Georgia (country)) Georgia	2021 Georgia women's football championship	WFC Lanchkhuti	Quarter	2nd	2019
Germany	2020–21 Frauen-Bundesliga	Bayern Munich	VfL Wolfsburg	4th	2015–16
Gibraltar	2020–21 Gibraltar Women's Football League	Lions Gibraltar	Europa	3rd	2014–15
Greece	2021 Greek A Division	P.A.O.K.	Avantes Chalkida	16th	2020
Hungary	2020–21 Női NB I	Ferencvárosi TC	MTK Hungária	4th	2019–20
Iceland	2021 Úrvalsdeild kvenna	Valur	Breiðablik	12th	2019
(Republic of Ireland) Ireland	2021 Women's National League	Shelbourne	Peamount United	2nd	2016
Israel	2020–21 Ligat Nashim	Maccabi Kiryat Gat	Bnot Netanya	2nd	2016–17
Italy	2020–21 Serie A	Juventus	A.C. Milan	4th	2019–20
Kazakhstan	2021 Kazakhstani women's football championship	BIIK Kazygurt	Tomiris Turan	15th	2020
Kosovo	2020–21 Kosovo Women's Football League	Mitrovica	Kosova	4th	2019–20
Latvia	2021 Latvian Women's League	Rīgas FS	Super Nova	8th	2020
Lithuania	2021 A-Lyga	FC Gintra	MFA Žalgiris	20th	2020
Luxembourg	2020–21 Dames Ligue 1	Racing	Bettembourg	1st	—
Malta	2020–21 Maltese First Division	Birkirkara	Swieqi United	9th	2018–19
Moldova	2020–21 Moldovan Women Top League	Agarista-ȘS Anenii Noi	Noroc Nimoreni	4th	2019–20
Montenegro	2020–21 Montenegrin Women's League	Breznica	Budućnost	6th	2019–20
Netherlands	2020–21 Eredivisie	Twente	PSV	6th	2018–19
North Macedonia	2020–21 Macedonian women's football championship	Kamenica Sasa	Tiverija Istatov	1st	—
Northern Ireland	2021 Women's Premiership	Glentoran	Cliftonville	9th	2020
Norway	2021 Toppserien	Sandviken	Rosenborg	1st	—
Poland	2020–21 Ekstraliga	Czarni Sosnowiec	UKS SMS Łódź	12nd	2000
Portugal	2020–21 Campeonato Nacional de Futebol Feminino	Benfica	Sporting CP	1st	—
Romania	2020–21 Liga I	Olimpia Cluj	Heniu Prundu	10th	2018–19
Russia	2021 Russian Championship	Lokomotiv Moscow	CSKA Moscow	1st	—
Scotland	2020–21 Scottish Women's Premier League	Glasgow City	Celtic	15th	2019
Serbia	2020–21 Serbian SuperLiga	Spartak Subotica	Mašinac PZP Niš	12nd	2019–20
Slovakia	2020–21 Slovak Women's First League	Season Abandoned, due to the COVID-19 pandemic			
Slovenia	2020–21 Slovenian Women's League	Pomurje	Olimpija Ljubljana	8th	2018–19
Spain	2020–21 Primera División	Barcelona	Real Madrid	6th	2019–20
Sweden	2021 Damallsvenskan	Rosengård	Häcken	11th	2019
Switzerland	2020–21 Swiss Women's Super League	Chênois	Zürich	1st	—
Turkey	2020–21 Turkcell Women's Football League	Beşiktaş	Fatih Vatan Spor	2nd	2018–19
Ukraine	2020–21 Vyshcha Liha	Zhytlobud-2 Kharkiv	Zhytlobud-1 Kharkiv	4th	2019–20
Wales	2020–21 Welsh Premier League	Swansea City	Cardiff Met.	4th	2019–20

=== AFC ===
Nation	League	Champion	Second place	Title	Last honour
Afghanistan	2021 Afghan Women's Premier League	Kohistan Herat	Ordu Kabul	2nd	2020
Australia	2020–21 W-League	Melbourne Victory	Sydney FC	2nd	2013–14
Bangladesh	2020–21 Bangladesh Women's Football League	Bashundhara Kings	ARB Sporting	2nd	2019–20
Bhutan	2021 Kelme-Bhutan Women's National League	Sunrise FC	Mandala	2nd	2019
Cambodia	2021 Cambodia Women's Football League	Nagaworld; PKR Svay Rieng	N/A	1st	—
China	2021 Chinese Women's Super League	Wuhan Jianghan University	Jiangsu	2nd	2020
Chinese Taipei	2021 Taiwan Mulan Football League	Taichung Blue Whale	Hualien FC	4th	2019
Guam	2020–21 Guam Women Soccer League	Season cancelled, due to the COVID-19 pandemic			
Hong Kong	2020–21 Hong Kong Women League	Chelsea F.C. Soccer School (HK)	HKWFC	1st	—
India	2020–21 Indian Women's Super League	Season cancelled, due to the COVID-19 pandemic			
Iran	2020–21 Kowsar Women Football League	Shahrdari Sirjan	Sepahan	2nd	2015–16
Iraq	2020–21 Iraqi Women's Football League	Naft Al-Shamal	Fatat Nineveh	1st	—
Jordan	2021 Jordan Women's Football League	Amman	Al Ahly	2nd	2011
South Korea	2021 WK League	Incheon Hyundai Steel Red Angels	Gyeongju KHNP	9th	2020
Kyrgyzstan	2021 Kyrgyzstan Women's Championship				
Laos	2021 Laos Women's League				
Lebanon	2020–21 Lebanese Women's Football League	Safa	Eleven Football Pro	1st	—
Mongolia	2021 Women's National Football League				
Myanmar	2020–21 Myanmar Women League				
Nepal	2021 National Women's League	Nepal A.P.F. Club	Tribhuvan Army F.C.	3rd	2017–18
North Korea	2020–21 DPR Korea Women's Football League				
Pakistan	2021 National Women Football Championship	Season cancelled, due to the COVID-19 pandemic			
Palestine	2020–21 Palestine Women's League				
Philippines	2020–21 PFF Women's League	Not Held			
Thailand	2021 Thai Women's League	BG Bundit Asia	Chonburi FA	1st	—
(Timor-Leste) East Timor	2021 Palmares Women	S'Amuser FC	FC Buibere	1st	—
Uzbekistan	2021 Uzbek women's football championship	Sogdiyona	Bunyodkor	1st	—
Vietnam	2021 Vietnam Women's Football League	Hồ Chí Minh City	Hà Nội	10th	2020

=== CAF ===
Nation	League	Champion	Second place	Title	Last honour
Algeria	2020–21 Algerian Women's Championship	Afak Relizane	AS Sûreté Nationale	9th	2016–17
Ethiopia	2020–21 Ethiopian Women's Premier League	CBE SA	Mekelakeya	1st	–
Ghana	2020–21 Ghana Women's Premier League	Hasaacas Ladies	Ampem Darkoa Ladies	4th	2014–15
Kenya	2021 Kenya Women's Football League	Thika Queens	Gaspo Youth	3rd	2016
Malawi	2021 FAM Women's Football League				
Morocco	2020–21 Moroccan Women's Championship	AS FAR	Raja Ait Izza	8th	2019–20
Namibia	2020–21 Namibia Women's Super League	Tura Magic	Galz & Goals	2nd	2015–16
Nigeria	2020–21 NWFL Premiership	Rivers Angels	Delta Queens	7th	2019
South Africa	2021 ABSA Women's League	Mamelodi Sundowns Ladies	TUT Ladies	4th	2020
South Africa	2020–21 ABSA Women's League	Not Held			
Tunisia	2020–21 Tunisian Women's Championship	ASF Sousse	AS Banque de l'Habitat	1st	–
Uganda	2021 FUFA Women Super League	Lady Doves	UCU Lady Cardinals	1st	–

=== CONCACAF ===
Nation	League	Champion	Second place	Title	Last honour
Belize	2020–21 National Women's Football League	Not Held			
El Salvador	2021 Salvadoran women's football championship	FAS	Alianza	2nd	2019
Guatemala	2020–21 National Women's Football League Clausura	Deportivo Xela		3rd	Apertura 2020
Guatemala	2020–21 National Women's Football League Apertura	Deportivo Xela	Unifut	2nd	Clausura 2017
Mexico	2021 Liga MX Femenil Clausura	UANL	CD Guadalajara	4th	Apertura 2020
Mexico	2020 Liga MX Femenil Apertura	UANL	Monterrey	3rd	Clausura 2019
United States (Note: The NWSL operates solely in the United States. However, the league then received financial support from the Canadian Soccer Association, and an agreement between the NWSL, CSA, and United States Soccer Federation guaranteed NWSL roster places to core members of the Canada national team. The 2021 season was the last for this arrangement.)	2021 National Women's Soccer League season	Washington Spirit	Chicago Red Stars	1st	–

=== CONMEBOL ===
Nation	League	Champion	Second place	Title	Last honour
Argentina	2020 Campeonato de Fútbol Femenino Apertura	San Lorenzo de Almagro	Boca Juniors	3rd	2015
Argentina	2021 Campeonato de Fútbol Femenino Clausura	Boca Juniors	San Lorenzo de Almagro	24th	2020
Bolivia	2021 Copa Simón Bolívar Femenina	Real Tomayapo	ABB	1st	—
Brazil	2021 Campeonato Brasileiro de Futebol Feminino Série A1	Corinthians	Palmeiras	3rd	2020
Chile	2021 Chilean women's football championship	Not Held			
Colombia	2021 Colombian Women's Football League	Deportivo Cali	Santa Fe	1st	—
Ecuador	2021 SuperLiga Femenina	Deportivo Cuenca	Ñañas	2nd	2019
Paraguay	2021 Paraguayan women's football championship	Cerro Porteño	Sol de América	7th	2018
Peru	2021 Liga Femenina	Alianza Lima	Universitario	1st	—
Venezuela	2021 Liga FUTVE Fem	Yaracuyanos	Caracas	1st	—

=== OFC ===
Nation	League	Champion	Second place	Title	Last honour
New Zealand	2021 Women's National League	Southern United	Capital Football	1st	—
Solomon Islands	2021 Women's Premier League	RSIPF Royals	Solright Eels FC	2nd	2020

== Women's Domestic cup ==
=== UEFA ===
Nation	Tournament	Champion	Final score	Second place	Title	Last honor
Albania	2020–21 Albanian Women's Cup	Vllaznia	Awd.	Apolonia	8th	2019–20
Austria	2020–21 ÖFB Ladies Cup	Not Held				
Belarus	2020–21 Belarusian Women's Cup	Dinamo-BGU	5–0	FC Minsk	2nd	2020
Belarus	2021 Belarus Women's Super cup	Dinamo-BGU	4–0	FC Minsk	1st	—
Belgium	2021 Belgian Women's Cup	Tournament cancelled, due to the COVID-19 pandemic				
Bosnia and Herzegovina	2021 Bosnia and Herzegovina Women's Football Cup	SFK 2000	3–0	ŽNK Iskra Bugojno	16th	2019
Bulgaria	2020–21 Bulgarian Women's Cup	NSA Sofia	4–0	Barocco	18th	2018–19
Croatia	2020–21 Croatian Women's Football Cup	Split	0–0 (5–4 p)	Osijek	3rd	2018–19
Cyprus	2020–21 Cypriot Women's Cup	Omonia lefkosias	0–0 (4–3 p)	Apollon Limassol	1st	—
Czech Republic	2020–21 Czech Women's Cup	Tournament cancelled, due to the COVID-19 pandemic				
Denmark	2020–21 Danish Women's Cup	Thy-Thisted Q	2–0	Brøndby IF	1st	—
England	2020–21 Women's FA Cup	Chelsea	3–0	Arsenal	3rd	2017–18
England	2021 Women's FA Community Shield	Tournament cancelled, due to the COVID-19 pandemic				
England	2020–21 FA Women's League Cup	Chelsea	6–0	Bristol City	2nd	2019–20
Estonia	2021 Estonian Women's Cup	FC Flora	3–0	Pärnu JK	4th	2020
Estonia	2021 Estonian Women's Supercup	JK Tallinna Kalev	1–0	Flora	1st	—
Faroe Islands	2021 Faroese Women's Cup	NSÍ	4–2	HB	1st	—
Faroe Islands	2021 Faroese Women's Super Cup	KÍ	4–1	NSÍ	1st	—
Finland	2021 Finnish Women's Cup	Åland United	1–1 (a.e.t.) (4–2 p)	PK-35 Vantaa	2nd	2020
France	2021 Coupe de France féminine	Tournament cancelled, due to the COVID-19 pandemic				
France	2021 Trophée des Championnes					
Germany	2020–21 DFB-Pokal Frauen	VfL Wolfsburg	1–0 (a.e.t.)	Eintracht Frankfurt	8th	2019–20
Gibraltar	2021 Women's Rock Cup	Not Held				
Hungary	2021 Hungarian Women's Cup	Ferencvárosi TC	5–1	Astra Hungary FC	6th	2019
Iceland	2021 Icelandic Women's Football Cup	Breiðablik	4–0	Knattspyrnufélagið Þróttur	13rd	2018
Iceland	2021 Icelandic Women's League cup	Tournament cancelled, due to the COVID-19 pandemic				
Iceland	2021 Icelandic Women's Supercup					
(Republic of Ireland) Ireland	2021 FAI Women's Cup	Wexford Youths	3–1	Shelbourne	4th	2019
Israel	2020–21 Israeli Women's Cup	Kiryat Gat	2–1	Maccabi Emek Hefer	2nd	2017–18
Italy	2020–21 Italian Women's Cup	AS Roma	0–0 (a.e.t.) (3–1 p)	A.C. Milan	1st	—
Italy	2021 Italian Women's Super Cup	Juventus	2–1	A.C. Milan	3rd	2020
Latvia	2021 Latvian Women's Cup					
Luxembourg	2020–21 Luxembourg Women's Cup	Tournament abandoned, due to the COVID-19 pandemic				
Malta	2020–21 Maltese Women's Cup	Tournament abandoned, due to the COVID-19 pandemic				
Moldova	2020–21 Moldovan Women's Cup	Narta ȘS Drăsliceni	2–1	FC Maksimum Cahul	5th	2009
Netherlands	2020–21 KNVB Women's Cup	PSV	1–0	ADO Den Haag	1st	—
Netherlands	2020–21 Eredivisie Cup	Ajax	3-2	FC Twente	1st	—
Northern Ireland	2021 IFA Women's Challenge Cup	Glentoran	2–0	Crusaders Strikers	9th	2019
Norway	2021 Norwegian Women's Cup	Vålerenga	2–1	Sandviken	2nd	2020
Poland	2020–21 Polish Cup	Czarni Sosnowiec	1–0	UKS SMS Łódź	12th	2002
Portugal	2020–21 Taça de Portugal Feminina	Tournament abandoned, due to the COVID-19 pandemic				
Portugal	2021 Taça da Liga Feminina	Benfica	2–1	Sporting CP	2nd	2020
Portugal	2021 Supertaça de Portugal Feminina	Sporting CP	2–0	Benfica	2nd	2017
Romania	2020–21 Cupa României	Olimpia Cluj	1–0 (a.e.t.)	ACS Heniu Prundu	7th	2016–17
Russia	2021 Russian Women's Cup	Lokomotiv Moscow	1–0	Zenit Saint Petersburg	2nd	2020
Russia	2021 Russian Women's Super Cup	Lokomotiv Moscow	1–0	CSKA Moscow	1st	—
Scotland	2020–21 Scottish Women's Cup	Tournament cancelled, due to the COVID-19 pandemic				
Serbia	2021 Serbian Women's Cup	Spartak Subotica	3–1	Mašinac PZP Niš	8th	2018–19
Slovakia	2021 Slovak Women's Cup	Tournament cancelled, due to the COVID-19 pandemic				
Slovenia	2020–21 Slovenian Women's Cup	Olimpija Ljubljana	1–1 (5–3 p)	Pomurje Beltinci	1st	—
Spain	2020–21 Copa de la Reina de Fútbol	Barcelona	4–2	Levante	8th	2019–20
Spain	2020–21 Supercopa de España Femenina	Atlético Madrid	3–0	Levante	1st	—
Sweden	2020–21 Svenska Cupen	BK Häcken	3–0	Eskilstuna United	4th	2019
Switzerland	2021 Swiss Women's Cup	FC Luzern	2–0	FC Zürich	5th	2006
Ukraine	2020–21 Ukrainian Women's Cup	Zhytlobud-2 Kharkiv	1–0	Zhytlobud-1 Kharkiv	1st	—

=== AFC ===
Nation	Tournament	Champion	Final score	Second place	Title	Last honour
Japan	2021 Empress's Cup	Urawa Reds	1–0	JEF United Chiba	1st	—
Japan	2021 Nadeshiko League Cup	Not Held				
Lebanon	2020–21 Lebanese Women's FA Cup	Eleven Football Pro	2–2 (5–4 p)	Beirut Football Academy	1st	—
Malaysia	2021 Piala Tun Sharifah Rodziah	Not Held				

=== CAF ===
Nation	Tournament	Champion	Final score	Second place	Title	Last honour
Algeria	2020–21 Algerian Women's Cup	Not Held				
Algeria	2020–21 Algerian Women's League Cup	Not Held				
Algeria	2021 Algerian Women's Super Cup	Not Held				
Burkina Faso	2021 Coupe du Faso Féminine	Étincelles FC	4–0	National AS	2nd	2018
Burkina Faso	2021 Super Coupe Féminine	Not Held				
Liberia	2021 Liberia Women Cup	Earth Angels	1–0	Senior Pros	10th	2019
Morocco	2021 Moroccan Women Throne Cup	Tournament cancelled, due to the COVID-19 pandemic				
Nigeria	2021 Nigeria Women's Cup	Bayelsa Queens	4–2	Robo Queens	1st	—
Nigeria	2021 Nigeria Women's Super Cup	Not Held				
Réunion	2021 Réunion Women Cup	Saint-Denis FC	3–2	SS St.-Louisienne	3rd	1995
Senegal	2021 Senegal Women Cup	Not Held				

=== CONCACAF ===
Nation	Tournament	Champion	Final score	Second place	Title	Last honour
United States	2021 NWSL Challenge Cup Championship	Portland Thorns	1–1 (6–5 p)	NJ/NY Gotham	1st	—

=== CONMEBOL ===
Nation	Tournament	Champion	Final score	Second place	Title	Last honour
Argentina	2021 Copa Federal de Fútbol Femenino	UAI Urquiza	2–1	Boca Juniors	1st	—

=== OFC ===
Nation	Tournament	Champion	Final score	Second place	Title	Last honour
New Zealand	2021 Kate Sheppard Cup	Wellington United	1–0	Hamilton Wanderers	1st	—

== Second, third, fourth, and fifth leagues ==
=== UEFA ===
Nation	League	Champion	Second place	Title	Last honour
Albania	2020–21 Kategoria e Parë	Egnatia	Dinamo Tirana	2nd	2002–03
Albania	2020–21 Kategoria e Dytë	Shkumbini	Maliqi	2nd	1978–79
Albania	2021 Kategoria e Tretë	AF Luftëtari	Murlani	1st	—
Andorra	2020–21 Segona Divisió	Ordino	FS La Massana	3rd	2017–18
Armenia	2020–21 Armenian First League	Sevan	BKMA	2nd	2018–19
Austria	2020–21 Austrian Football Second League	Blau-Weiß Linz	Liefering	1st	—
Austria	2020–21 Austrian Regionalliga	Season Abandoned, due to the COVID-19 pandemic			
Azerbaijan	2020–21 Azerbaijan First Division	Neftçi-2	Zagatala	1st	—
Azerbaijan	2020–21 Azerbaijan Regional League				
Belarus	2021 Belarusian First League	Arsenal Dzerzhinsk	Belshina Bobruisk	1st	—
Belarus	2021 Belarusian Second League	Ostrovets	BC Maxline	1st	—
Belarus	2021 Belarusian Premier League Reserves Championship	Dinamo Minsk (Reserves)	BATE Borisov (Reserves)	10th	2020
Belgium	2020–21 Belgian First Division B	Union SG	Seraing	2nd	1963–64
Belgium	2020–21 Belgian First Amateur Division	Season Abandoned, due to the COVID-19 pandemic			
Belgium	2020–21 Belgian Division 2	Season Abandoned, due to the COVID-19 pandemic			
Belgium	2020–21 Belgian Division 3	Season Abandoned, due to the COVID-19 pandemic			
Bosnia and Herzegovina; *3-4 tier has been omitted	2020–21 First League of the Federation of Bosnia and Herzegovina	Posušje	TOŠK Tešanj	1st	—
Bosnia and Herzegovina; *3-4 tier has been omitted	2020–21 First League of the Republika Srpska	Rudar Prijedor	Leotar	3rd	2014–15
Bulgaria; *3 tier has been omitted	2020–21 Second Professional Football League	Pirin Blagoevgrad	Lokomotiv Sofia	1st	—
Croatia; *3 tier has been omitted	2020–21 Croatian Second Football League	Hrvatski Dragovoljac	Rudeš	3rd	2012–13
Cyprus	2020–21 Cypriot Second Division	PAEEK	Aris Limassol FC	1st	—
Cyprus	2020–21 Cypriot Third Division	Omonia 29is Maiou	Olympias Lympion	1st	—
Cyprus	2020–21 STOK Elite Division	Season Abandoned, due to the COVID-19 pandemic			
Czech Republic; *5 tier has been omitted	2020–21 Czech National Football League	Hradec Králové	Líšeň	3rd	2009–10
Czech Republic; *5 tier has been omitted	2020–21 Bohemian Football League	Season Abandoned, due to the COVID-19 pandemic			
Czech Republic; *5 tier has been omitted	2020–21 Moravian–Silesian Football League	Season Abandoned, due to the COVID-19 pandemic			
Czech Republic; *5 tier has been omitted	2020–21 Czech Fourth Division	(Divize A) Přeštice	Sokol Lom	N/A	N/A
Czech Republic; *5 tier has been omitted	2020–21 Czech Fourth Division	(Divize B) Neratovice-Byškovice	Baník Souš	N/A	N/A
Czech Republic; *5 tier has been omitted	2020–21 Czech Fourth Division	(Divize C) Sparta Kolín	Vysoké Mýto	N/A	N/A
Czech Republic; *5 tier has been omitted	2020–21 Czech Fourth Division	(Divize D) Hodonín	Zbrojovka Brno II	N/A	N/A
Czech Republic; *5 tier has been omitted	2020–21 Czech Fourth Division	(Divize E) Viktorie Přerov	Kozlovice	N/A	N/A
Czech Republic; *5 tier has been omitted	2020–21 Czech Fourth Division	(Divize F) Frýdlant	Bílovec	N/A	N/A
Denmark; *5-8 tier has been omitted	2020–21 Danish 1st Division	Viborg	Silkeborg	1st	—
Denmark; *5-8 tier has been omitted	2020–21 Danish 2nd Divisions	(West) Jammerbugt	Boldklubben af 1893	1st	—
Denmark; *5-8 tier has been omitted	2020–21 Danish 2nd Divisions	(East) Nykøbing	HIK	2nd	2002–03
Denmark; *5-8 tier has been omitted	2020–21 Denmark Series	IF Lyseng	Young Boys FD	N/A	N/A
England; *9-20 tier has been omitted	2020–21 EFL Championship	Norwich City	Watford	5th	2018–19
England; *9-20 tier has been omitted	2020–21 EFL League One	Hull City	Peterborough United	1st	—
England; *9-20 tier has been omitted	2020–21 EFL League Two	Cheltenham Town	Cambridge United	1st	—
England; *9-20 tier has been omitted	2020–21 National League	Sutton United	Torquay United	1st	—
England; *9-20 tier has been omitted	2020–21 Northern Premier League	Season cancelled, due to the COVID-19 pandemic			
England; *9-20 tier has been omitted	2020–21 Southern Football League	Season cancelled, due to the COVID-19 pandemic			
England; *9-20 tier has been omitted	2020–21 Isthmian League	Season Abandoned, due to the COVID-19 pandemic			
Estonia; *5 tier has been omitted	2021 Esiliiga A	Maardu	Tallinna Kalev	3rd	2018
Estonia; *5 tier has been omitted	2021 Esiliiga B	Viimsi	Harju Laagri	1st	—
Estonia; *5 tier has been omitted	2021 II liiga				
Faroe Islands	2021 1. deild	Skála ÍF	Víkingur II	2nd	2015
Faroe Islands	2021 2. deild	Undrið FF	ÍF II	1st	—
Faroe Islands	2021 3. deild				
Finland; *5-8 tier has been omitted	2021 Ykkönen	VPS	RoPS	1st	—
Finland; *5-8 tier has been omitted	2021 Kakkonen	(Group A) JaPS	PEPO	N/A	N/A
Finland; *5-8 tier has been omitted	2021 Kakkonen	(Group B) PIF	Honka Akatemia	N/A	N/A
Finland; *5-8 tier has been omitted	2021 Kakkonen	(Group C) SJK Akatemia	JJK	N/A	N/A
Finland; *5-8 tier has been omitted	2021 Kolmonen	Season Abandoned, due to the COVID-19 pandemic			
France; *Level 5-17 has been omitted	2020–21 Ligue 2	Troyes	Clermont	2nd	2014–15
France; *Level 5-17 has been omitted	2020–21 Championnat National	Bastia	Quevilly-Rouen	2nd	2010–11
France; *Level 5-17 has been omitted	2020–21 Championnat National 2	Season Abandoned, due to the COVID-19 pandemic			
(Georgia (country)) Georgia; *Level 4-5 has been omitted	2021 Erovnuli Liga 2	Sioni Bolnisi	Gagra	2nd	1994–95 (East)
(Georgia (country)) Georgia; *Level 4-5 has been omitted	2021 Liga 3	Spaeri Tbilisi	Kolkheti-1913 Poti	1st	—
Germany; *Level 6 has been omitted	2020–21 2. Bundesliga	VfL Bochum	SpVgg Greuther Fürth	4th	2005–06
Germany; *Level 6 has been omitted	2020–21 3. Liga	Dynamo Dresden	Hansa Rostock	2nd	2015–16
Germany; *Level 6 has been omitted	2020–21 Regionalliga	(Nord)	No Champion		
Germany; *Level 6 has been omitted	2020–21 Regionalliga	(Nordost) Viktoria Berlin	Altglienicke	1st	—
Germany; *Level 6 has been omitted	2020–21 Regionalliga	(Südwest) Freiburg II	Elversberg	1st	—
Germany; *Level 6 has been omitted	2020–21 Regionalliga	(West) Borussia Dortmund II	Rot-Weiss Essen	3rd	2011–12
Germany; *Level 6 has been omitted	2020–21 Regionalliga	(Bayern) Schweinfurt 05	Viktoria Aschaffenburg	1st	—
Germany; *Level 6 has been omitted	2020–21 Oberliga Baden-Württemberg	Season Abandoned, due to the COVID-19 pandemic			
Germany; *Level 6 has been omitted	2020–21 Bayernliga	(North) Eltersdorf	DJK Vilzing	N/A	N/A
Germany; *Level 6 has been omitted	2020–21 Bayernliga	(South) Pipinsried	Deisenhofen	N/A	N/A
Germany; *Level 6 has been omitted	2020–21 Bremenliga	Season Abandoned, due to the COVID-19 pandemic			
Germany; *Level 6 has been omitted	2020–21 Oberliga Hamburg	Season Abandoned, due to the COVID-19 pandemic			
Germany; *Level 6 has been omitted	2020–21 Hessenliga	Season Abandoned, due to the COVID-19 pandemic			
Germany; *Level 6 has been omitted	2020–21 Mittelrheinliga	Season Abandoned, due to the COVID-19 pandemic			
Germany; *Level 6 has been omitted	2020–21 Oberliga Niederrhein	Season Abandoned, due to the COVID-19 pandemic			
Germany; *Level 6 has been omitted	2020–21 Oberliga Niedersachsen	Heeslinger	Spelle-Venhaus	N/A	N/A
Germany; *Level 6 has been omitted	2020–21 Oberliga Nordost	(North) Tasmania Berlin	Greifswalder FC	N/A	N/A
Germany; *Level 6 has been omitted	2020–21 Oberliga Nordost	(South) Eilenburg	VfL Halle 1896	N/A	N/A
Germany; *Level 6 has been omitted	2020–21 Oberliga Rheinland-Pfalz/Saar	Season Abandoned, due to the COVID-19 pandemic			
Germany; *Level 6 has been omitted	2020–21 Oberliga Schleswig-Holstein	Season Abandoned, due to the COVID-19 pandemic			
Germany; *Level 6 has been omitted	2020–21 Oberliga Westfalen	Season Abandoned, due to the COVID-19 pandemic			
Greece; *Level 5 has been omitted	2020–21 Super League Greece 2	Ionikos	Xanthi	2nd	1993–94
Greece; *Level 5 has been omitted	2020–21 Football League (Greece)	(North) Veria	Kavala	4th	1976–77 (Group 2)
Greece; *Level 5 has been omitted	2020–21 Football League (Greece)	(South) Kalamata	Episkopi	3rd	1973–74 (Group 2)
Greece; *Level 5 has been omitted	2020–21 Gamma Ethniki	(Group 1) Orfeas Xanthi	Iraklis	1st	—
Greece; *Level 5 has been omitted	2020–21 Gamma Ethniki	(Group 2) Poseidon Michaniona	Thyella Sarakinoi	1st	—
Greece; *Level 5 has been omitted	2020–21 Gamma Ethniki	(Group 3) Anagennisi Karditsa	Karitsa	4th	1996–97 (Group 2)
Greece; *Level 5 has been omitted	2020–21 Gamma Ethniki	(Group 4) Diagoras Stefanovikeio	Iraklis Psachna	1st	—
Greece; *Level 5 has been omitted	2020–21 Gamma Ethniki	(Group 5) Acheron Kanallaki	Lefkimmi	1st	—
Greece; *Level 5 has been omitted	2020–21 Gamma Ethniki	(Group 6) Panionios	Ilioupolis	1st	—
Greece; *Level 5 has been omitted	2020–21 Gamma Ethniki	(Group 7) Kifisia	Rouf	1st	—
Greece; *Level 5 has been omitted	2020–21 Gamma Ethniki	(Group 8) Thyella Rafina	Aiolikos	1st	—
Greece; *Level 5 has been omitted	2020–21 Gamma Ethniki	(Group 9) Zakynthos	Diagoras Vrachnaiika	1st	—
Greece; *Level 5 has been omitted	2020–21 Gamma Ethniki	(Group 10) Irodotos	Agios Nikolaos	3rd	2017–18 (Group 8)
Hungary; *Level 4-8 has been omitted	2020–21 Nemzeti Bajnokság II	Debrecen	Gyirmót	8th	1992–93 (East)
Hungary; *Level 4-8 has been omitted	2020–21 Nemzeti Bajnokság III	(West) III. Kerület	Mosonmagyaróvár	2nd	1986–87 (Group 3)
Hungary; *Level 4-8 has been omitted	2020–21 Nemzeti Bajnokság III	(Centre) Iváncsa	Kecskemét	1st	—
Hungary; *Level 4-8 has been omitted	2020–21 Nemzeti Bajnokság III	(East) Tiszakécske	BVSC-Zugló	3rd	2017–18 (Centre)
Iceland	2021 1. deild karla	Fram	ÍBV	5th	2006
Iceland	2021 2. deild karla	Þróttur Vogum	KV	1st	—
Iceland	2021 3. deild karla	Höttur/Huginn	Ægir	1st	—
Iceland	2021 4. deild karla	KH	Kormákur/Hvöt	2nd	2017
(Republic of Ireland) Ireland	2021 League of Ireland First Division	Shelbourne	Galway United	2nd	2019
Israel	2020–21 Liga Leumit	Hapoel Nof HaGalil	Hapoel Jerusalem	1st	—
Israel	2020–21 Liga Alef	(North) Maccabi Bnei Reineh	Tira	1st	—
Israel	2020–21 Liga Alef	(South) Hapoel Ashdod	Maccabi Kabilio Jaffa	2nd	1989–90 (South)
Israel	2020–21 Liga Bet	(North A Division) Tzeirei Kafr Kanna	Ihud Bnei Shefa-'Amr	N/A	N/A
Israel	2020–21 Liga Bet	(North B Division) Ironi Nesher	Tirat Carmel	N/A	N/A
Israel	2020–21 Liga Bet	(South A Division) Shimshon Tel Aviv	Hapoel Mahane Yehuda	N/A	N/A
Israel	2020–21 Liga Bet	(South B Division) Bnei Eilat	Maccabi Ironi Sderot	N/A	N/A
Israel	2020–21 Liga Gimel	(Upper Galilee) Maccabi Bnei Jadeidi Makr	Hapoel Ihud Bnei Sumei	N/A	N/A
Israel	2020–21 Liga Gimel	(Lower Galilee) Hapoel Deir Hanna	Ironi Bnei Sha'ab	N/A	N/A
Israel	2020–21 Liga Gimel	(Jezreel) Hapoel Daliyat al-Karmel	Tzeirei Umm al-Fahm	N/A	N/A
Israel	2020–21 Liga Gimel	(Samaria) Maccabi Isfiya	Hapoel Kiryat Yam	N/A	N/A
Israel	2020–21 Liga Gimel	(Sharon) Tzeirei Tira	Bnei Herzliya	N/A	N/A
Israel	2020–21 Liga Gimel	(Tel Aviv) Hapoel Ramat Yisrael	HaMakhtesh Givatayim	N/A	N/A
Israel	2020–21 Liga Gimel	(Central) Ramla	Bnei Yeechalal Rehovot	N/A	N/A
Israel	2020–21 Liga Gimel	(South) Hapoel Segev Shalom	Maccabi Be'er Sheva	N/A	N/A
Italy; *Level 5-8 has been omitted	2020–21 Serie B	Empoli	Salernitana	3rd	2017–18
Italy; *Level 5-8 has been omitted	2020–21 Serie C	(Group A) Como	Alessandria	2nd	1967–68 (Group A)
Italy; *Level 5-8 has been omitted	2020–21 Serie C	(Group B) Perugia	Padova	3rd	1966–67 (Group B)
Italy; *Level 5-8 has been omitted	2020–21 Serie C	(Group C) Ternana	Catanzaro	2nd	1967–68 (Group C)
Italy; *Level 5-8 has been omitted	2020–21 Serie D	Title not assigned			
Kazakhstan	2021 Kazakhstan First Division	Aksu	Maktaaral	1st	—
Kosovo	2020–21 First Football League of Kosovo	(Group A) Malisheva	Dukagjini	1st	—
Kosovo	2020–21 First Football League of Kosovo	(Group B) Ulpiana	Flamurtari	1st	—
Kosovo	2020–21 Second Football League of Kosovo	Fushë Kosova	Rahoveci	1st	—
Kosovo	2020–21 Third Football League of Kosovo	(Kosovo Plain) Shkëndija Hajvalia	Kosova VR	1st	—
Kosovo	2020–21 Third Football League of Kosovo	(Dukagjini Plain) Prizreni	Australia Mitrovica	1st	—
Latvia	2021 Latvian First League	Season Abandoned, due to the COVID-19 pandemic			
Latvia	2021 Latvian Second League	Season Abandoned, due to the COVID-19 pandemic			
Lithuania	2021 LFF I Lyga	Šiauliai	Jonava	1st	—
Lithuania	2021 II Lyga	Ekranas	Be1 NFA	1st	—
Lithuania	2021 III Lyga	(Alytus) RESE Alytus	Druskininkai	4th	2020 (Alytus)
Lithuania	2021 III Lyga	(Kaunas-Marijampolė) Tauras	Šturmas Kaunas	2nd	2006 (Tauragė)
Lithuania	2021 III Lyga	(Klaipėda) Sakuona	Neptūnas (Reserves)	4th	2019 (Klaipėda)
Lithuania	2021 III Lyga	(Panevėžys) PSSK Atomas	Dembava	2nd	2013 (Panevėžys)
Lithuania	2021 III Lyga	(Šiauliai) ŠSPC-Radviliškis	Akmenė	2nd	2018 (Šiauliai)
Lithuania	2021 III Lyga	(Vilnius) IFEX Margiris	Medžiai Vilnius	2nd	2020 (Vilnius)
Lithuania	2021 SFL	(Group A) Geležinis Vilkas	Lentvaris	1st	—
Lithuania	2021 SFL	(Group B) Nemenčinė-Hegvita	Modulis Pabradė	2nd	2012 (Group B2)
Lithuania	2021 SFL	(Group C) Anykščiai	Spartakas Ukmergė (Reserves)	1st	—
Lithuania	2021 SFL	(Group D) Ataka Vilnius	IFEX Margiris (Reserves)	1st	—
Luxembourg	2020–21 Luxembourg Division of Honour	Season Abandoned, due to the COVID-19 pandemic			
Luxembourg	2020–21 Luxembourg 1. Division	Season Abandoned, due to the COVID-19 pandemic			
Luxembourg	2020–21 Luxembourg 2. Division	Season Abandoned, due to the COVID-19 pandemic			
Luxembourg	2020–21 Luxembourg 3. Division	Season Abandoned, due to the COVID-19 pandemic			
Malta	2020–21 Maltese Challenge League	Season Abandoned, due to the COVID-19 pandemic			
Malta	2020–21 Maltese National Amateur League	Luqa St. Andrew's	Melita	1st	—
Moldova	2020–21 Moldovan "A" Division	Bălți	Cahul-2005	1st	—
Moldova	2020–21 Moldovan "B" Division	(North) Ungheni	Codru-Juniori	1st	—
Moldova	2020–21 Moldovan "B" Division	(South) Sporting Trestieni	Saxan	1st	—
Montenegro	2020–21 Montenegrin Second League	Mornar	Arsenal Tivat	2nd	2017–18
Montenegro	2020–21 Montenegrin Third League	(North) Petnjica	Borac	2nd	2010–11
Montenegro	2020–21 Montenegrin Third League	(Center) Mladost DG	Nikšić	2nd	2019–20
Montenegro	2020–21 Montenegrin Third League	(South) Cetinje	Orjen	4th	2018–19
Netherlands; *Level 6-10 has been omitted	2020–21 Eerste Divisie	Cambuur	Go Ahead Eagles	3rd	2012–13
Netherlands; *Level 6-10 has been omitted	2020–21 Tweede Divisie	Season Abandoned, due to the COVID-19 pandemic			
Netherlands; *Level 6-10 has been omitted	2020–21 Derde Divisie	Season Abandoned, due to the COVID-19 pandemic			
Netherlands; *Level 6-10 has been omitted	2020–21 Hoofdklasse	Season Abandoned, due to the COVID-19 pandemic			
North Macedonia; *Level 4-5 has been omitted	2020–21 Macedonian Second Football League	(East) Bregalnica Štip	Tikvesh	3rd	2003–04
North Macedonia; *Level 4-5 has been omitted	2020–21 Macedonian Second Football League	(West) Skopje	Ohrid	2nd	1996–97 (West)
North Macedonia; *Level 4-5 has been omitted	2020–21 Macedonian Third Football League	Season Abandoned, due to the COVID-19 pandemic			
Northern Ireland; *Level 4-5 has been omitted	2020–21 NIFL Championship	Season cancelled, due to the COVID-19 pandemic			
Northern Ireland; *Level 4-5 has been omitted	2020–21 NIFL Premier Intermediate League	Season cancelled, due to the COVID-19 pandemic			
Norway; *Level 5 has been omitted	1. divisjon	Hamarkameratene	Aalesund	6th	2003
Norway; *Level 5 has been omitted	2. divisjon	(Group 1) Kongsvinger	Hødd	3rd	2015 (Group 4)
Norway; *Level 5 has been omitted	2. divisjon	(Group 2) Skeid	Arendal	5th	2018 (Group 2)
Norway; *Level 5 has been omitted	3. divisjon	(Group 1) Gjøvik-Lyn	Gjelleråsen	1st	—
Norway; *Level 5 has been omitted	3. divisjon	(Group 2) Ørn Horten	Eik Tønsberg	1st	—
Norway; *Level 5 has been omitted	3. divisjon	(Group 3) Staal Jørpeland	Sola	2nd	2016 (Group 6)
Norway; *Level 5 has been omitted	3. divisjon	(Group 4) Frigg Oslo	Fana	2nd	2015 (Group 3)
Norway; *Level 5 has been omitted	3. divisjon	(Group 5) Træff	Spjelkavik	2nd	2011 (Group 9)
Norway; *Level 5 has been omitted	3. divisjon	(Group 6) Ullern	Lokomotiv Oslo	2nd	2014 (Group 2)
Norway; *Level 5 has been omitted	4. divisjon	(Agder 1) Søgne	Vigør	N/A	N/A
Norway; *Level 5 has been omitted	4. divisjon	(Agder 2) Randesund	Jerv (Reserves)	N/A	N/A
Norway; *Level 5 has been omitted	4. divisjon	(Akershus) Skjetten	Eidsvold	N/A	N/A
Norway; *Level 5 has been omitted	4. divisjon	(Buskerud) Vestfossen	Modum	N/A	N/A
Norway; *Level 5 has been omitted	4. divisjon	(Finnmark) Bossekop	HIF/Stein	N/A	N/A
Norway; *Level 5 has been omitted	4. divisjon	(Hordaland 1A) Bremnes	Sund	N/A	N/A
Norway; *Level 5 has been omitted	4. divisjon	(Hordaland 1B) Bergen Nord	Askøy	N/A	N/A
Norway; *Level 5 has been omitted	4. divisjon	(Hordaland 2A) Lyngbø	Arna-Bjørnar	N/A	N/A
Norway; *Level 5 has been omitted	4. divisjon	(Hordaland 2B) Frøya	Nordhordland	N/A	N/A
Norway; *Level 5 has been omitted	4. divisjon	(Hålogaland) Harstad	Sortland	N/A	N/A
Norway; *Level 5 has been omitted	4. divisjon	(Indre Østland 1) Lillehammer	Hamarkameratene (Reserves)	N/A	N/A
Norway; *Level 5 has been omitted	4. divisjon	(Indre Østland 2) Engerdal	Ottestad	N/A	N/A
Norway; *Level 5 has been omitted	4. divisjon	(Nordland) Innstranden	Mosjøen	N/A	N/A
Norway; *Level 5 has been omitted	4. divisjon	(Nordmøre og Romsdal) Tomrefjord	Kristiansund (Reserves)	N/A	N/A
Norway; *Level 5 has been omitted	4. divisjon	(Oslo 1) Grei	Gamle Oslo	N/A	N/A
Norway; *Level 5 has been omitted	4. divisjon	(Oslo 2) Kjelsås (Reserves)	Heming	N/A	N/A
Norway; *Level 5 has been omitted	4. divisjon	(Rogaland 1) Sandnes Ulf (Reserves)	Eiger	N/A	N/A
Norway; *Level 5 has been omitted	4. divisjon	(Rogaland 2) Haugesund (Reserves)	Kopervik	N/A	N/A
Norway; *Level 5 has been omitted	4. divisjon	(Sogn og Fjordane 1) Eid	Måløy	N/A	N/A
Norway; *Level 5 has been omitted	4. divisjon	(Sogn og Fjordane 2) Førde	Stryn	N/A	N/A
Norway; *Level 5 has been omitted	4. divisjon	(Sunnmøre) Hødd (Reserves)	Herd	N/A	N/A
Norway; *Level 5 has been omitted	4. divisjon	(Telemark) Urædd	Stathelle og Omegn	N/A	N/A
Norway; *Level 5 has been omitted	4. divisjon	(Troms) Krokelvdalen	Skarp	N/A	N/A
Norway; *Level 5 has been omitted	4. divisjon	(Trøndelag 1) Levanger (Reserves)	Verdal	N/A	N/A
Norway; *Level 5 has been omitted	4. divisjon	(Trøndelag 2) Steinkjer	Vuku	N/A	N/A
Norway; *Level 5 has been omitted	4. divisjon	(Trøndelag 3) Trygg/Lade	Nardo (Reserves)	N/A	N/A
Norway; *Level 5 has been omitted	4. divisjon	(Trøndelag 4) Kvik	Buvik	N/A	N/A
Norway; *Level 5 has been omitted	4. divisjon	(Vestfold) Sandefjord (Reserves)	Eik Tønsberg (Reserves)	N/A	N/A
Norway; *Level 5 has been omitted	4. divisjon	(Østfold) Sprint-Jeløy	Råde	N/A	N/A
Poland	2020–21 I liga	Radomiak Radom	Bruk-Bet Termalica Nieciecza	2nd	1983–84 (Group 2)
Poland	2020–21 II liga	Górnik Polkowice	Katowice	N/A	N/A
Poland	2020–21 III liga	(Group 1) Pogoń Grodzisk Mazowiecki	Świt Nowy Dwór Mazowiecki	N/A	N/A
Poland	2020–21 III liga	(Group 2) Radunia Stężyca	Świt Szczecin	N/A	N/A
Poland	2020–21 III liga	(Group 3) Ruch Chorzów	Polonia Bytom	N/A	N/A
Poland	2020–21 III liga	(Group 4) Wisła Puławy	Sokół Sieniawa	N/A	N/A
Poland	2020–21 IV liga	(Group 1) Lechia Dzierżoniów	Strzegom	N/A	N/A
Poland	2020–21 IV liga	(Group 2) Karkonosze Jelenia Góra	Chrobry Głogów (Reserves)	N/A	N/A
Poland	2020–21 IV liga	(Group 3) Zawisza Bydgoszcz	Włocłavia Włocławek	N/A	N/A
Poland	2020–21 IV liga	(Group 4) Tomasovia Tomaszów Lubelski	Świdniczanka Świdnik	N/A	N/A
Poland	2020–21 IV liga	(Group 5) Carina Gubin	Ilanka Rzepin	N/A	N/A
Poland	2020–21 IV liga	(Group 6) ŁKS Łódź (Reserves)	Warta Sieradz	N/A	N/A
Poland	2020–21 IV liga	(Group 7) Unia Tarnów	Poprad Muszyna	N/A	N/A
Poland	2020–21 IV liga	(Group 8) Wiślanie Jaśkowice	Orzeł Ryczów	N/A	N/A
Poland	2020–21 IV liga	(Group 9) Mławianka Mława	Świt Staroźreby	N/A	N/A
Poland	2020–21 IV liga	(Group 10) Ząbkovia Ząbki	Victoria Sulejówek	N/A	N/A
Poland	2020–21 IV liga	(Group 11) Pilica Białobrzegi	Mazovia Mińsk Mazowiecki	N/A	N/A
Poland	2020–21 IV liga	(Group 12) Ruch Zdzieszowice	Starowice Dolne	N/A	N/A
Poland	2020–21 IV liga	(Group 13) Korona Rzeszów	Izolator Boguchwała	N/A	N/A
Poland	2020–21 IV liga	(Group 14) Wissa Szczuczyn	Tur Bielsk Podlaski	N/A	N/A
Poland	2020–21 IV liga	(Group 15) Stolem Gniewino	Kaszubia Kościerzyna	N/A	N/A
Poland	2020–21 IV liga	(Group 16) Raków Częstochowa	Znicz Kłobuck	N/A	N/A
Poland	2020–21 IV liga	(Group 17) Odra Wodzisław Śląski	Spójnia Landek	N/A	N/A
Poland	2020–21 IV liga	(Group 18) Czarni Połaniec	Moravia Morawica	N/A	N/A
Poland	2020–21 IV liga	(Group 19) Mamry Giżycko	Mrągowia Mrągowo	N/A	N/A
Poland	2020–21 IV liga	(Group 20) Pogoń Nowe Skalmierzyce	Warta Międzychód	N/A	N/A
Poland	2020–21 IV liga	(Group 21) Kluczevia Stargard	Vineta Wolin	N/A	N/A
Portugal	2020–21 Liga Portugal 2	Estoril	Vizela	3rd	2011–12
Portugal	2020–21 Campeonato de Portugal	Trofense	Estrela da Amadora	1st	—
Romania	2020–21 Liga II	U Craiova 1948	Rapid București	2nd	2005–06 (Group 2)
Romania	2020–21 Liga III	(Group 1) Bucovina Rădăuți	Foresta Suceava	1st	—
Romania	2020–21 Liga III	(Group 2) Oțelul Galați	Dacia Unirea Brăila	3rd	1980–81 (Group 3)
Romania	2020–21 Liga III	(Group 3) Afumați	Mostiștea Ulmu	2nd	2015–16 (Group 3)
Romania	2020–21 Liga III	(Group 4) Steaua București	FCSB II	1st	—
Romania	2020–21 Liga III	(Group 5) Corona Brașov	SR Brașov	2nd	2011–12 (Group 6)
Romania	2020–21 Liga III	(Group 6) Vedița Colonești	Filiași	1st	—
Romania	2020–21 Liga III	(Group 7) Viitorul Șelimbăr	Măgura Cisnădie	1st	—
Romania	2020–21 Liga III	(Group 8) Șoimii Lipova	Crișul Chișineu-Criș	2nd	1991–92 (Group 11)
Romania	2020–21 Liga III	(Group 9) Cugir	Unirea Dej	3rd	1989–90 (Group 11)
Romania	2020–21 Liga III	(Group 10) Minaur Baia Mare	Zalău	6th	2014–15 (Group 5)
Russia; *Level 4 has been omitted	2020–21 Russian Football National League	Krylia Sovetov Samara	Orenburg	2nd	2014–15
Russia; *Level 4 has been omitted	2020–21 Russian Professional Football League	(Group 1) Kuban Krasnodar	Kuban-Holding	1st	—
Russia; *Level 4 has been omitted	2020–21 Russian Professional Football League	(Group 2) Olimp-Dolgoprudny	Zenit-2 Saint Petersburg	1st	—
Russia; *Level 4 has been omitted	2020–21 Russian Professional Football League	(Group 3) Metallurg Lipetsk	Ryazan	5th	2008 (Centre)
Russia; *Level 4 has been omitted	2020–21 Russian Professional Football League	(Group 4) KAMAZ	Tyumen	3rd	2014–15 (Ural-Povolzhye)
Scotland; *Level 5-7 has been omitted	2020–21 Scottish Championship	Heart of Midlothian	Dundee	3rd	2014–15
Scotland; *Level 5-7 has been omitted	2020–21 Scottish League One	Partick Thistle	Airdrieonians	2nd	2000–01
Scotland; *Level 5-7 has been omitted	2020–21 Scottish League Two	Queen's Park	Edinburgh City	2nd	1999–00
Serbia; *Level 4-7 has been omitted	2020–21 Serbian First League	Radnički 1923	Kolubara	1st	—
Serbia; *Level 4-7 has been omitted	2020–21 Serbian League	(Belgrade) Teleoptik	Brodarac	2nd	2016–17
Serbia; *Level 4-7 has been omitted	2020–21 Serbian League	(East) Timok	Budućnost Popovac	2nd	2011–12
Serbia; *Level 4-7 has been omitted	2020–21 Serbian League	(Vojvodina) Mladost Novi Sad	Vršac	1st	—
Serbia; *Level 4-7 has been omitted	2020–21 Serbian League	(West) Sloga Požega	Jedinstvo Ub	1st	—
Slovakia; *Level 4-8 has been omitted	2020–21 2. Liga	Tatran Liptovský Mikuláš	Dukla Banská Bystrica	1st	—
Slovakia; *Level 4-8 has been omitted	2020–21 3. Liga	(Bratislava) Rohožník	Rača	1st	—
Slovakia; *Level 4-8 has been omitted	2020–21 3. Liga	(West) Spartak Myjava	Beluša	2nd	2010–11 (West)
Slovakia; *Level 4-8 has been omitted	2020–21 3. Liga	(Central) Námestovo	Rakytovce	1st	—
Slovakia; *Level 4-8 has been omitted	2020–21 3. Liga	(East) Humenné	Odeva Lipany	1st	—
Slovenia	2020–21 Slovenian Second League	Radomlje	Krka	2nd	2015–16
Slovenia	2020–21 Slovenian Third League	(East) Rogaška	Bistrica	1st	—
Slovenia	2020–21 Slovenian Third League	(West) Ilirija 1911	Izola	2nd	2015–16 (Centre)
Spain; *Level 6-10 has been omitted	2020–21 Segunda División	Espanyol	Mallorca	2nd	1993–94
Spain; *Level 6-10 has been omitted	2020–21 Segunda División B	(Group 1C) Burgos	Celta de Vigo B	2nd	2000–01 (Group A)
Spain; *Level 6-10 has been omitted	2020–21 Segunda División B	(Group 2C) Real Sociedad B	Athletic Bilbao B	1st	—
Spain; *Level 6-10 has been omitted	2020–21 Segunda División B	(Group 3C) Ibiza	Barcelona B	1st	—
Spain; *Level 6-10 has been omitted	2020–21 Segunda División B	(Group 4C) Linares Deportivo	UCAM Murcia	1st	—
Spain; *Level 6-10 has been omitted	2020–21 Segunda División B	(Group 5C) Badajoz	San Sebastián de los Reyes	1st	—
Spain; *Level 6-10 has been omitted	2020–21 Tercera División	(Group 1) Arenteiro	Bergantiños	1st	—
Spain; *Level 6-10 has been omitted	2020–21 Tercera División	(Group 2) Ceares	Llanera	1st	—
Spain; *Level 6-10 has been omitted	2020–21 Tercera División	(Group 3) Cayón	Rayo Cantabria	1st	—
Spain; *Level 6-10 has been omitted	2020–21 Tercera División	(Group 4) Gernika	Real Sociedad C	1st	—
Spain; *Level 6-10 has been omitted	2020–21 Tercera División	(Group 5) Europa	Vilafranca	3rd	1962–63 (Group 7)
Spain; *Level 6-10 has been omitted	2020–21 Tercera División	(Group 6) Eldense	Alzira	13th	2013–14 (Group 6)
Spain; *Level 6-10 has been omitted	2020–21 Tercera División	(Group 7) Leganés B	Unión Adarve	1st	—
Spain; *Level 6-10 has been omitted	2020–21 Tercera División	(Group 8) Gimnástica Segoviana	Palencia Cristo Atlético	4th	2005–06 (Group 8)
Spain; *Level 6-10 has been omitted	2020–21 Tercera División	(Group 9) Vélez	Atlético Mancha Real	2nd	1991–92 (Group 9)
Spain; *Level 6-10 has been omitted	2020–21 Tercera División	(Group 10) Xerez Deportivo	San Roque de Lepe	1st	—
Spain; *Level 6-10 has been omitted	2020–21 Tercera División	(Group 11) Ibiza Islas Pitiusas	Andratx	1st	—
Spain; *Level 6-10 has been omitted	2020–21 Tercera División	(Group 12) Mensajero	Panadería Pulido	3rd	2014–15 (Group 12)
Spain; *Level 6-10 has been omitted	2020–21 Tercera División	(Group 13) Águilas	Pulpileño	1st	—
Spain; *Level 6-10 has been omitted	2020–21 Tercera División	(Group 14) Cacereño	Montijo	12th	2016–17 (Group 14)
Spain; *Level 6-10 has been omitted	2020–21 Tercera División	(Group 15) Peña Sport	San Juan	10th	2016–17 (Group 15)
Spain; *Level 6-10 has been omitted	2020–21 Tercera División	(Group 16) Racing Rioja	Náxara	1st	—
Spain; *Level 6-10 has been omitted	2020–21 Tercera División	(Group 17) Teruel	Brea	4th	2017–18 (Group 17)
Spain; *Level 6-10 has been omitted	2020–21 Tercera División	(Group 18) Marchamalo	Calvo Sotelo Puertollano	1st	—
Sweden; *Level 5-10 has been omitted	2021 Superettan	Värnamo	Sundsvall	1st	—
Sweden; *Level 5-10 has been omitted	2021 Division 1	(Norra) Brommapojkarna	Dalkurd	2nd	2016 (Norra)
Sweden; *Level 5-10 has been omitted	2021 Division 1	(Södra) Utsikten	Skövde	2nd	2014 (Södra)
Sweden; *Level 5-10 has been omitted	2021 Division 2	(Norrland) Team TG	Friska Viljor	N/A	N/A
Sweden; *Level 5-10 has been omitted	2021 Division 2	(Norra Svealand) Stockholm Internazionale	Karlberg	N/A	N/A
Sweden; *Level 5-10 has been omitted	2021 Division 2	(Södra Svealand) Motala	United Nordic	N/A	N/A
Sweden; *Level 5-10 has been omitted	2021 Division 2	(Norra Götaland) Oddevold	Forward	N/A	N/A
Sweden; *Level 5-10 has been omitted	2021 Division 2	(Södra Götaland) Olympic	Hässleholm	N/A	N/A
Sweden; *Level 5-10 has been omitted	2021 Division 2	(Västra Götaland) Ängelholm	Eskilsminne	N/A	N/A
Switzerland; *Level 6-9 has been omitted	2020–21 Swiss Challenge League	Grasshoppers	Thun	2nd	1950–51
Switzerland; *Level 6-9 has been omitted	2020–21 Swiss Promotion League	Yverdon-Sport	Cham	1st	—
Switzerland; *Level 6-9 has been omitted	2020–21 Swiss 1. Liga	(Group 1) Young Boys (Reserves)	Chênois	2nd	2017–18
Switzerland; *Level 6-9 has been omitted	2020–21 Swiss 1. Liga	(Group 2) Biel-Bienne	Baden	3rd	2005–06
Switzerland; *Level 6-9 has been omitted	2020–21 Swiss 1. Liga	(Group 3) Wettswil-Bonstetten	Tuggen	2nd	2014–15 (Group 3)
Switzerland; *Level 6-9 has been omitted	2020–21 2. Liga Interregional	(Group 1) Monthey	Servette (Reserves)	N/A	N/A
Switzerland; *Level 6-9 has been omitted	2020–21 2. Liga Interregional	(Group 2) La Sarraz-Eclépens	Fribourg	N/A	N/A
Switzerland; *Level 6-9 has been omitted	2020–21 2. Liga Interregional	(Group 3) Thun (Reserves)	Ajoie-Monterri	N/A	N/A
Switzerland; *Level 6-9 has been omitted	2020–21 2. Liga Interregional	(Group 4) Team Ticino U21	Taverne	N/A	N/A
Switzerland; *Level 6-9 has been omitted	2020–21 2. Liga Interregional	(Group 5) Freienbach	Lachen/Altendorf	N/A	N/A
Switzerland; *Level 6-9 has been omitted	2020–21 2. Liga Interregional	(Group 6) Uzwil	Kreuzlingen	N/A	N/A
Turkey; *Level 5-8 has been omitted	2020–21 TFF First League	Adana Demirspor	Giresunspor	4th	1990–91 (Group C)
Turkey; *Level 5-8 has been omitted	2020–21 TFF Second League	(White) Manisa	Hekimoğlu Trabzon	1st	—
Turkey; *Level 5-8 has been omitted	2020–21 TFF Second League	(Red) Eyüpspor	Sakaryaspor	1st	—
Turkey; *Level 5-8 has been omitted	2020–21 TFF Third League	(Group 1) Diyarbekirspor 1977	Bucaspor 1928	1st	—
Turkey; *Level 5-8 has been omitted	2020–21 TFF Third League	(Group 2) Nazilli Belediyespor	Belediye Kütahyaspor	4th	2011–12 (Group 2)
Turkey; *Level 5-8 has been omitted	2020–21 TFF Third League	(Group 3) Somaspor	Esenler Erokspor	1st	—
Turkey; *Level 5-8 has been omitted	2020–21 TFF Third League	(Group 4) Adıyaman	Bursa Yıldırımspor	1st	—
Ukraine; *Level 4-8 has been omitted	2020–21 Ukrainian First League	Veres Rivne	Chornomorets Odesa	2nd	1992 (Group A)
Ukraine; *Level 4-8 has been omitted	2020–21 Ukrainian Second League	Metal Kharkiv	Podillya Khmelnytskyi	1st	—
Wales; *Level 4-10 has been omitted	2020–21 Cymru North	Season cancelled, due to the COVID-19 pandemic			
Wales; *Level 4-10 has been omitted	2020–21 Cymru South	Season cancelled, due to the COVID-19 pandemic			
Wales; *Level 4-10 has been omitted	2020–21 Ardal Leagues	Season cancelled, due to the COVID-19 pandemic			
Wales; *Level 4-10 has been omitted	2020–21 Welsh Alliance League	Season cancelled, due to the COVID-19 pandemic			

=== AFC ===
Nation	League	Champion	Second place	Title	Last honour
Australia; *Level 3-20 has been omitted	2021 National Premier Leagues	Season Abandoned, due to the COVID-19 pandemic			
Bahrain	2020–21 Bahraini Second Division	Al Hala	Al-Khaldiya	2nd	2005–06
Bangladesh	2020–21 Bangladesh Championship League	Swadhinata	NoFeL	1st	—
Bhutan	2021 Bhutan Super League	Season cancelled, due to the COVID-19 pandemic			
Brunei	2021 Brunei Premier League	Season cancelled, due to the COVID-19 pandemic			
Cambodia	2021 Cambodian Second League	Bati Academy	ISI Dangkor Senchey	1st	—
China; *Level 4-12 has been omitted	2021 China League One	Wuhan Three Towns	Meizhou Hakka	1st	—
China; *Level 4-12 has been omitted	2021 China League Two	Qingdao Hainiu	Hebei Kungfu	1st	—
Chinese Taipei	2021 Taiwan Second Division Football League	Andy Chen Academy	Ming Chuan University	1st	—
Hong Kong	2020–21 Hong Kong First Division League	HKFC	North District	15th	2017–18
Hong Kong	2020–21 Hong Kong Second Division League	Tung Sing	Kwun Tong	4th	2015–16
Hong Kong	2020–21 Hong Kong Third Division League	King Mountain	Sun Hei	1st	—
India	2021 I-League 2nd Division	Rajasthan United	Kenkre	1st	—
Indonesia	2021 Liga 2	Persis Solo	RANS Cilegon	1st	—
Indonesia	2021 Liga 3	Shifted to 2021–22			
Iran; *Level 4 has been omitted	2020–21 Azadegan League	Fajr Sepasi Shiraz	Havadar	1st	—
Iran; *Level 4 has been omitted	2020–21 League 2	Mes Shahr-e Babak	Shahrdari Hamedan	1st	—
Iraq	2020–21 Iraqi First Division League	Al-Sinaa	Newroz	1st	—
Japan; *Level 5-7 has been omitted	2021 J2 League	Júbilo Iwata	Kyoto Sanga	1st	—
Japan; *Level 5-7 has been omitted	2021 J3 League	Roasso Kumamoto	Iwate Grulla Morioka	1st	—
Japan; *Level 5-7 has been omitted	2021 Japan Football League	Iwaki	Honda	1st	—
Jordan	2020–21 Jordan League Division 1	Mgaear Al-Sarhan	Al-Sareeh	1st	—
Kuwait	2020–21 Kuwaiti Division One	Al-Tadamon	Al-Yarmouk	4th	1992–93
Kyrgyzstan	2021 Kyrgyz National League	Nashe Pivo	Nur-Batken	N/A	N/A
Laos	2021 Lao League 2	Season cancelled, due to the COVID-19 pandemic			
Lebanon; *Level 4-5 has been omitted	2020–21 Lebanese Second Division	Sporting	Sagesse	1st	—
Lebanon; *Level 4-5 has been omitted	2020–21 Lebanese Third Division	Sporting Qlaileh	Shabab Majdal Anjar	1st	—
Macau	2021 2ª Divisão de Macau	Sun City	CDF Benfica	1st	—
Malaysia	2021 Malaysia Premier League	Negeri Sembilan	Sarawak United	1st	—
Malaysia	2021 Malaysia M3 League	Season cancelled, due to the COVID-19 pandemic			
Malaysia	2021 Malaysia M4 League	Season cancelled, due to the COVID-19 pandemic			
Maldives	2021 FAM 2nd Division	Not Held			
Maldives	2021 FAM 3rd Division	Buru	Biss Buru	N/A	N/A
Mongolia	2021 Mongolia 1st League	Khovd	Tuv Buganuud	1st	—
Myanmar	2021 MNL-2	Season cancelled, due to the ongoing 2021 Myanmar protests			
Oman	2020–21 Oman First Division League	Season cancelled, due to the COVID-19 pandemic			
Oman	2020–21 Oman Second Division League	Season cancelled, due to the COVID-19 pandemic			
Palestine; *Level 4 has been omitted	2020–21 Gaza Strip First League	Al-Ahli Gaza	Gaza	N/A	N/A
Palestine; *Level 4 has been omitted	2020–21 Gaza Strip Second League	(Group A) Khadamat Jabalia	Beat Lahia	N/A	N/A
Palestine; *Level 4 has been omitted	2020–21 Gaza Strip Second League	(Group B) Al-Ahli Al-Nosirat	Al-Ittihad Dear Balah	N/A	N/A
Palestine; *Level 4 has been omitted	2020–21 West Bank First League	Markaz Tulkarem	Islami Qalqilya	N/A	N/A
Palestine; *Level 4 has been omitted	2020–21 West Bank Second League	(Group A) Markaz Raqam Wahad	Jenin	N/A	N/A
Palestine; *Level 4 has been omitted	2020–21 West Bank Second League	(Group B) Al-Sawahreh	Abu Dis	N/A	N/A
Palestine; *Level 4 has been omitted	2020–21 West Bank Second League	(Group C) Islami Sur Baher	Shabab Yatta	N/A	N/A
Qatar	2020–21 Qatari Second Division	Al-Shamal	Al-Shahania	3rd	2014–15
Saudi Arabia	2020–21 Prince Mohammad bin Salman League	Al-Hazem	Al-Fayha	2nd	2004–05
Saudi Arabia	2020–21 Saudi Second Division	Al-Okhdood	Al-Orobah	2nd	1991–92
Saudi Arabia	2020–21 Saudi Third Division	Al-Saqer	Al-Nairyah	1st	—
Singapore	2021 Singapore National Football League	Season cancelled, due to the COVID-19 pandemic			
South Korea; *Level 5-8 has been omitted	2021 K League 2	Gimcheon Sangmu	Anyang	1st	—
South Korea; *Level 5-8 has been omitted	2021 K3 League	Gimpo	Cheonan City	1st	—
South Korea; *Level 5-8 has been omitted	2021 K4 League	Pocheon Citizen	Siheung Citizen	1st	—
Syria	2020–21 Syrian League 1st Division	(Final 1) Afrin	Al-Muhafaza	N/A	N/A
Syria	2020–21 Syrian League 1st Division	(Final 2) Nawair	Al-Majd	N/A	N/A
Tajikistan	2021 Tajikistan First League	Regar-TadAZ	Ravshan Zafarobod	N/A	N/A
Tajikistan	2021 Tajikistan Second League	Guliston	Sarhadchi	N/A	N/A
Thailand	2020–21 Thai League 2	Nongbua Pitchaya	Chiangmai United	1st	—
Thailand	2020–21 Thai League 3	Lamphun Warriors	Muangkan United	1st	—
Thailand	2021 Thailand Amateur League	Season cancelled, due to the COVID-19 pandemic			
Timor-Leste	2021 LFA Segunda	Emmanuel	Académica	1st	—
Turkmenistan	2021 Turkmenistan First League				
United Arab Emirates	2020–21 UAE Division 1	Al Urooba	Emirates	2nd	1991–92
United Arab Emirates	2020–21 UAE Division 2	Abtal Al Khaleej	Dubai City	1st	—
Uzbekistan	2021 Uzbekistan Pro League	Neftchi Fergana	Dinamo Samarqand	1st	—
Uzbekistan	2021 Uzbekistan Pro-B League	Zaamin	G'ijduvon	1st	—
Vietnam	2021 V.League 2	Season Abandoned, due to the COVID-19 pandemic			
Vietnam	2021 Vietnamese League Two	Season cancelled, due to the COVID-19 pandemic			
Vietnam	2021 Vietnamese League Three	Season cancelled, due to the COVID-19 pandemic			
Yemen	2020–21 Yemeni Second Division				

=== CAF ===
Nation	League	Champion	Second place	Title	Last honour
Algeria; *Level 4 has been omitted	2020–21 Algerian Ligue 2	HB Chelghoum Laïd	RC Arbaâ	1st	—
Algeria; *Level 4 has been omitted	2020–21 Ligue Nationale du Football Amateur	(East) HAMRA Annaba	US Tébessa	N/A	N/A
Algeria; *Level 4 has been omitted	2020–21 Ligue Nationale du Football Amateur	(Centre-East) JS Bordj Ménaïel	JS Djijel	N/A	N/A
Algeria; *Level 4 has been omitted	2020–21 Ligue Nationale du Football Amateur	(Centre-West) USMM Hadjout	E Sour El Ghozlane	N/A	N/A
Algeria; *Level 4 has been omitted	2020–21 Ligue Nationale du Football Amateur	(West) GC Mascara	WA Mostaganem	N/A	N/A
Algeria; *Level 4 has been omitted	2020–21 Ligue Nationale du Football Amateur	(South-East) IRB Ouargla	US Souf	N/A	N/A
Algeria; *Level 4 has been omitted	2020–21 Ligue Nationale du Football Amateur	(South-West) MC El Bayadh	NRB Fenoughil	N/A	N/A
Angola; *Level 3-4 has been omitted	2021 Segundona	(Group A) Kabuscorp	ASK Dragão	1st	—
Angola; *Level 3-4 has been omitted	2021 Segundona	(Group B) Sporting de Benguela	Mpatu a Ponta	1st	—
Angola; *Level 3-4 has been omitted	2021 Segundona	(Group C) Lunda Sul	Sporting do Bié	1st	—
Botswana; *Level 3-4 has been omitted	2020–21 Botswana First Division	Season cancelled, due to the COVID-19 pandemic			
Cameroon	2020–21 Elite Two	RC Bafoussam	OFTA de Kribi	2nd	2015
(Democratic Republic of the Congo) DR Congo	2020–21 Linafoot Ligue 2	(East) Étoile de Kivu (Note: On 27 July, actual winner AS Kabasha were deducted 21 points for fielding an ineligible player in seven playoff matches.)	AS Nika	N/A	N/A
(Democratic Republic of the Congo) DR Congo	2020–21 Linafoot Ligue 2	(West) Kuya Sport	MK Etanchéité	N/A	N/A
(Democratic Republic of the Congo) DR Congo	2020–21 Linafoot Ligue 2	(South Central) US Panda B52	CS Manika	N/A	N/A
Egypt	2020–21 Egyptian Second Division	(Group A) Eastern Company	Al Aluminium	1st	—
Egypt	2020–21 Egyptian Second Division	(Group B) Coca-Cola	El Dakhleya	1st	—
Egypt	2020–21 Egyptian Second Division	(Group C) Pharco	Haras El Hodoud	1st	—
Ethiopia	2020–21 Ethiopian Higher League	(Group A) Defence Force	EEPCO	N/A	N/A
Ethiopia	2020–21 Ethiopian Higher League	(Group B) Addis Ababa City	Hambericho Durame	N/A	N/A
Ethiopia	2020–21 Ethiopian Higher League	(Group C) Arba Minch City	Kolfe Keranio	N/A	N/A
(The Gambia) Gambia	2020–21 GFA League Second Division	Falcons FC Abuko	Samger	1st	—
Ghana; *Level 3-4 has been omitted	2021 Division One League	(Zone One) Real Tamale United	Bofoakwa Tano	N/A	N/A
Ghana; *Level 3-4 has been omitted	2021 Division One League	(Zone Two) Bibiani Gold Stars	Skyy FC	1st	—
Ghana; *Level 3-4 has been omitted	2021 Division One League	(Zone Three) Accra Lions	Tema Youth	1st	—
Ivory Coast	2020–21 Ligue 2 (Ivory Coast)	LYS Sassandra	CO Korhogo	2nd	2017–18
Ivory Coast	2020–21 Championnat Division 3	Zoman FC	Guerry FC	N/A	N/A
Kenya; *Level 4-7 has been omitted	2020–21 Kenyan National Super League	Talanta	Vihiga Bullets	2nd	2017
Kenya; *Level 4-7 has been omitted	2020–21 FKF Division One	(Zone A) Naivas FC	SS Assad	N/A	N/A
Kenya; *Level 4-7 has been omitted	2020–21 FKF Division One	(Zone B) Mara Sugar	Luanda Villa	N/A	N/A
Liberia	2020–21 Liberian Second Division League	Heaven Eleven	BYC II	1st	—
Libya	2020–21 Libyan Second Division				
Libya	2020–21 Libyan Third Division				
Morocco; *Level 3-6 has been omitted	2020–21 Botola 2	Olympique Khouribga	Jeunesse Soualem	1st	—
Nigeria; *Level 3 has been omitted	2020–21 Nigeria National League	Niger Tornadoes	Shooting Stars	3rd	2014–15
Rwanda	2021 Rwandan Second Division	Gicumbi	Étoile de l'Est	N/A	N/A
Sierra Leone	2021 Sierra Leone National First Division	Season Abandoned, due to the COVID-19 pandemic			
Somalia	2020–21 Somali Division One	Badbaado	Sahafi	N/A	N/A
Somalia	2020–21 Somali Division Two	Not Held			
South Africa; *Level 4 has been omitted	2020–21 National First Division	Sekhukhune United	Royal AM	1st	—
South Africa; *Level 4 has been omitted	2020–21 SAFA Second Division	Hungry Lions	Platinum City Rovers	1st	—
South Sudan	2021 South Sudan Premier League	Not Held			
Tanzania	2020–21 Tanzanian First Division League	Geita Gold	Mbeya Kwanza	N/A	N/A
Tanzania	2020–21 Tanzanian Second Division League	Green Warriors	Mashujaa FC	N/A	N/A
Tunisia; *Level 3-5 has been omitted	2020–21 Tunisian Ligue Professionnelle 2	CS Hammam-Lif	ES Hammam-Sousse	6th	2017–18
Uganda	2020–21 FUFA Big League	Arua Hill	Tooro United	1st	—
Zambia	2020–21 National Division One	Konkola Blades	Kafue Celtic	1st	—

=== CONCACAF ===
Nation	League	Champion	Second place	Title	Last honour
Aruba	2020–21 Aruban Division Uno	Not Held			
Canada	2021 League1 Ontario	Guelph United	Blue Devils	1st	—
Canada	2021 Première Ligue de soccer du Québec	CS Mont-Royal Outremont	AS Blainville	4th	2016
Canada	2021 Alberta Major Soccer League	Not Held			
Canada	2021 Canadian Soccer League	Scarborough	Vorkuta	2nd	2019
Costa Rica	2020–21 Liga de Ascenso	AD Guanacasteca	Barrio México	5th	2001–02
Costa Rica	2020–21 Tercera División de Costa Rica	Not Held			
El Salvador	2020 Segunda División de Fútbol Profesional Apertura	Platense	AD Destroyer	3rd	Apertura 2019
El Salvador	2021 Segunda División de Fútbol Profesional Clausura	AD Destroyer	Platense	2nd	Clausura 2015
El Salvador	2020 Tercera División de Fútbol Profesional Apertura	(Centre-West) Inter San Salvador	Real Pajonal	1st	—
El Salvador	2020 Tercera División de Fútbol Profesional Apertura	(Centre-East) Corinto FC	Cangrejera	1st	—
El Salvador	2021 Tercera División de Fútbol Profesional Clausura	(Centre-West) Inter San Salvador	ADEREL Lourdes	2nd	Apertura 2020
El Salvador	2021 Tercera División de Fútbol Profesional Clausura	(Centre-East) Corinto FC	Atlas FC	2nd	Apertura 2020
Guatemala	2020 Primera División de Ascenso Apertura	Aurora	CSD Sololá	1st	—
Guatemala	2021 Primera División de Ascenso Clausura	Quiché FC	Nueva Concepción	1st	—
Guatemala	2020–21 Segunda División de Ascenso Torneo	Juventud Pinulteca	Deportivo Amatitlán	1st	—
Guatemala	2020 Tercera División de Ascenso Apertura	Gualán FC	Buenos Aires FC	1st	—
Guatemala	2021 Tercera División de Ascenso Clausura	Democracia FC	Cuilapa FC	1st	—
Honduras; *Level 3 has been omitted	2020 Honduran Liga Nacional de Ascenso Apertura	Not Held			
Honduras; *Level 3 has been omitted	2021 Honduran Liga Nacional de Ascenso Clausura	Victoria	Génesis Huracán	1st	—
Jamaica; *Level 3-4 has been omitted	2020–21 KSAFA Super League	Season cancelled, due to the COVID-19 pandemic			
Mexico	2020 Liga de Expansión MX Apertura	Tampico Madero	Atlante	1st	—
Mexico	2021 Liga de Expansión MX Clausura	Tepatitlán	Atlético Morelia	1st	—
Mexico	2020–21 Liga Premier de México	Irapuato	Cruz Azul Hidalgo	3rd	1984–85
Mexico	2020–21 Liga TDP	Fuertes de Fortín	RC–1128	1st	—
Nicaragua	2020–21 Segunda División de Nicaragua	UNAN Managua	H&H Export Sébaco	3rd	Apertura 2013
Nicaragua	2020–21 Tercera División de Nicaragua	San Bartolo FC	Municipal San Lucas	N/A	N/A
Panama; *Level 3 has been omitted	2021 Liga Prom Apertura	Alianza (Reserves)	Mario Méndez FC	1st	—
Panama; *Level 3 has been omitted	2021 Liga Prom Clausura	Panamá Oeste	Plaza Amador (Reserves)	1st	—
United States	2021 USL Championship	Orange County	Tampa Bay Rowdies	1st	—
United States	2021 USL League One	Union Omaha	Greenville Triumph	1st	—
United States	2020–21 National Independent Soccer Association	Detroit City	Los Angeles Force	1st	—
United States	2021 National Independent Soccer Association	Detroit City	California United Strikers	2nd	2020–21
United States	2021 USL League Two	Des Moines Menace	North Carolina Fusion U23	2nd	2005
United States	2021 National Premier Soccer League	Denton Diablos	Tulsa Athletic	1st	—
United States	2020 United Premier Soccer League Fall	Ginga Atlanta	Valley United	1st	—
United States	2021 United Premier Soccer League Spring	New York Contour United	East Valley United PRO	1st	—
United States	2021 NISA Nation	(Northeast) New Jersey Alliance	New Amsterdam (Reserves)	1st	—
United States	2021 NISA Nation	(Southwest) Golden State Force	Las Vegas Legends	1st	—
(United States Virgin Islands) Virgin Islands	2020–21 St. Croix Soccer League	Not Held			
(United States Virgin Islands) Virgin Islands	2020–21 St. Thomas League	Not Held			

=== CONMEBOL ===
Nation	League	Champion	Second place	Title	Last honour
Argentina	2021 Primera Nacional	Tigre	Barracas Central	1st	—
Argentina	2021 Primera B	Flandria	Colegiales	2nd	2016
Argentina	2021 Torneo Federal A	Deportivo Madryn	Racing de Córdoba	1st	—
Argentina	2021 Primera C	Dock Sud	Berazategui	1st	—
Argentina	2021 Primera D	Liniers	Puerto Nuevo	3rd	1989–90
Bolivia	2021 Copa Simón Bolívar	Universitario de Vinto	Universitario de Sucre	1st	—
Brazil	2021 Campeonato Brasileiro Série B	Botafogo	Goiás	2nd	2015
Brazil	2021 Campeonato Brasileiro Série C	Ituano	Tombense	2nd	2003
Brazil	2021 Campeonato Brasileiro Série D	Aparecidense	Campinense	1st	—
Brazil	(Rio de Janeiro (state)) 2021 Campeonato Carioca	Flamengo	Fluminense	37th	2020
Brazil	(Ceará) 2021 Campeonato Cearense	Fortaleza	Ceará	44th	2020
Brazil	(Sergipe) 2021 Campeonato Sergipano	Sergipe	Lagarto	36th	2018
Brazil	(Bahia) 2021 Campeonato Baiano	Atlético de Alagoinhas	Bahia de Feira	1st	—
Brazil	(Paraná (state)) 2021 Campeonato Paranaense	Londrina	Cascavel	5th	2014
Brazil	(Pernambuco) 2021 Campeonato Pernambucano	Náutico	Sport Recife	23rd	2018
Brazil	(Pará) 2021 Campeonato Paraense	Paysandu	Tuna Luso	49th	2020
Brazil	(Piauí) 2021 Campeonato Piauiense	Altos	Fluminense	3rd	2018
Brazil	(Piauí) 2021 Campeonato Paraibano	Campinense	Sousa	21st	2016
Brazil	(Minas Gerais) 2021 Campeonato Mineiro	Atlético Mineiro	América Mineiro	46th	2020
Brazil	(Santa Catarina (state)) 2021 Campeonato Catarinense	Avaí	Chapecoense	18th	2019
Brazil	(São Paulo (state)) 2021 Campeonato Paulista Série A1	São Paulo	Palmeiras	22nd	2005
Brazil	(São Paulo (state)) 2021 Campeonato Paulista Série A2	São Bernardo	Água Santa	2nd	2012
Brazil	(São Paulo (state)) 2021 Campeonato Paulista Série A3	Linense	Primavera	1st	—
Brazil	(Alagoas) 2021 Campeonato Alagoano	CSA	CRB	40th	2019
Brazil	(Amazonas (Brazilian state)) 2021 Campeonato Amazonense	Manaus	São Raimundo	4th	2019
Brazil	(Mato Grosso) 2021 Campeonato Mato-Grossense	Cuiabá	CEOV	10th	2019
Chile	2021 Primera B de Chile	Coquimbo Unido	Deportes Copiapó	4th	2018
Chile	2021 Segunda División Profesional de Chile	Deportes Recoleta	Iberia	1st	—
Chile	2021 Tercera División A de Chile	Trasandino	Real San Joaquín	2nd	2012
Chile	2021 Tercera División B de Chile	Deportes Quillón	Unión Compañías	1st	—
(Colombia) Columbia	2021–I Categoría Primera B	Deportes Quindío	Cortuluá	2nd	2001
(Colombia) Columbia	2021–II Categoría Primera B	Unión Magdalena	Cortuluá	1st	—
Ecuador	2021 Ecuadorian Serie B	Cumbayá	Gualaceo	1st	—
Ecuador	2021 Segunda Categoría	Libertad	Imbabura	1st	—
Paraguay	2021 División Intermedia	General Caballero	Resistencia	1st	—
Paraguay	2021 Primera División B	Atlético Colegiales	Martín Ledesma	3rd	2008
Paraguay	2021 Primera División B Nacional	Deportivo Itapuense	Sportivo Carapeguá	1st	—
Peru; *Level 3-7 has been omitted	2021 Peruvian Segunda División	Atlético Grau	Carlos Stein	1st	—
Uruguay; *Level 3 has been omitted	2021 Uruguayan Segunda División	Albion	Danubio	1st	—
Venezuela; *Level 3 has been omitted	2021 Venezuelan Segunda División	Titanes	Atlético La Cruz	1st	—

=== OFC ===
Nation	League	Champion	Second place	Title	Last honour
New Zealand	2021 Northern League	Auckland City	Auckland United	1st	—
New Zealand	2021 Central League	Wellington Olympic	Miramar Rangers	3rd	2016
New Zealand	2021 Southern League	Cashmere Technical	Selwyn United	1st	—
New Zealand	2021 NRFL Division 1	Waiheke United	Takapuna	1st	—
New Zealand	2021 Central Federation League	Havelock North Wanderers	Palmerston North Marist	3rd	2019
New Zealand	2021 Capital Premier	Lower Hutt City	Wellington United	2nd	2003
New Zealand	2021 Mainland Premier League	Cashmere Technical	Coastal Spirit	10th	2020
New Zealand	2021 FootballSouth Premier League	South City Royals	Green Island	1st	—
New Zealand	2021 NRFL Division 2	Onehunga Mangere United	Fencibles United	1st	—
(French Polynesia) Tahiti	2020–21 Tahiti Ligue 2	Tamarii Punaruu	Tamarii Temanava	2nd	2016–17

== Women's second, third and fourth leagues ==
=== UEFA ===
Nation	League	Champion	Second place	Title	Last honour
Austria	2020–21 2. Frauenliga				
Belarus	2021 2. Division				
Belgium	2020–21 Belgian Women's First Division				
Belgium	2020–21 Belgian Women's Second Division				
Belgium	2020–21 Belgian Women's Third Division				
Czech Republic	2020–21 Czech Second Division				
Denmark	2020–21 Danish Women's 1st Division				
England; *Level 4-9 has been omitted	2020–21 FA Women's Championship				
England; *Level 4-9 has been omitted	2020–21 FA Women's National League	Season abandoned due to the COVID-19 pandemic			
England; *Level 4-9 has been omitted	2020–21 FA Women's National League Division One	Season abandoned due to the COVID-19 pandemic			
Estonia	2021 Esiliiga				
Finland; *Level 3-5 has been omitted	2021 Naisten Ykkönen				
France	2020–21 Division 2 Féminine	(Group A)			
France	2020–21 Division 2 Féminine	(Group B)			
Germany; Level 3-10 has been omitted	2020–21 2. Frauen-Bundesliga				
Hungary	2020–21 Női NB II				
Iceland	2021 1. deild kvenna				
Iceland	2021 2. deild kvenna				
Italy	2020–21 Serie B				
Italy	2020–21 Serie C				
Netherlands; *Level 3-5 has been omitted	2020–21 Topklasse (women)				
Netherlands; *Level 3-5 has been omitted	2020–21 Hoofdklasse (women)				
Norway	2021 1. divisjon				
Poland	2021 I Liga				
Portugal	2020–21 Campeonato Nacional II Divisão Feminino				
Romania	2020–21 Liga II				
Romania	2020–21 Liga III				
Scotland	2020–21 SWPL 2	Aberdeen	Hamilton Academical	3rd	2011
Scotland	2020–21 Scottish Women's Football Championship	Season abandoned due to the COVID-19 pandemic			
Serbia	2020–21 Serbian First Women's League				
Spain	2020–21 Segunda División Pro	Alavés (North)	Osasuna	1st	–
Spain	2020–21 Segunda División Pro	Villarreal (South)	Fundación Albacete	1st	–
Spain	2020–21 Primera Nacional de Fútbol	(Group I)			
Spain	2020–21 Primera Nacional de Fútbol	(Group II)			
Spain	2020–21 Primera Nacional de Fútbol	(Group III)			
Spain	2020–21 Primera Nacional de Fútbol	(Group IV)			
Spain	2020–21 Primera Nacional de Fútbol	(Group V)			
Spain	2020–21 Primera Nacional de Fútbol	(Group VI)			
Spain	2020–21 Primera Nacional de Fútbol	(Group VII)			
Sweden; *Level 3-8 has been omitted	2021 Elitettan				
Turkey	2020–21 Turkish Women's Second Football League				
Turkey	2020–21 Turkish Women's Third Football League				

=== AFC ===
Nation	League	Champion	Second place	Title	Last honour
Australia	2021 National Premier Leagues				
China	2021 Women's League One				
Japan	2020–21 Nadeshiko League 2				

=== CAF ===
Nation	League	Champion	Second place	Title	Last honour
Kenya	2021 FKF Women's Division One				

=== CONCACAF ===
Nation	League	Champion	Second place	Title	Last honour
Mexico	2020–21 Liga Mexicana de Fútbol Femenil Clausura				
Mexico	2020–21 Liga Mexicana de Fútbol Femenil Apertura				
United States	2021 Women's Premier Soccer League				
United States	2021 United Women's Soccer League				

=== CONMEBOL ===
Nation	League	Champion	Second place	Title	Last honour
Argentina	2020–21 Campeonato de Fútbol Femenino de Primera División A				
Argentina	2020–21 Campeonato de Fútbol Femenino de Primera División B				
Argentina	2020–21 Campeonato de Fútbol Femenino de Primera División C				
Brazil	2021 Campeonato Brasileiro de Futebol Feminino Série A2	Red Bull Bragantino	Atlético Mineiro	1st	—

=== OFC ===
Nation	League	Champion	Second place	Title	Last honour
New Zealand	2021 NRFL Women's Premier League	Eastern Suburbs	Western Springs	9th	2019

== Men's university leagues ==
=== CONCACAF ===
Nation	League	Champion	Second place	Title	Last honour
Canada	2021 U Sports Men's Soccer Championship	Montreal Carabins	Carleton Ravens	2nd	2020
United States	2020 NCAA Division I Men's Soccer Tournament (Note: Held in spring 2021 instead of the normal schedule of fall 2020 due to COVID-19 issues.)	Marshall Thundering Herd	Indiana Hoosiers	1st	—
United States	2020 NAIA Men's Soccer Championship	Missouri Valley Vikings	Oklahoma Wesleyan Eagles	1st	—
United States	2021 NCAA Division I Men's Soccer Tournament	Clemson Tigers	Washington Huskies	3rd	1987
United States	2021 NCAA Division II Men's Soccer Tournament	Cal State Los Angeles Golden Eagles	Charleston Golden Eagles	1st	—
United States	2021 NCAA Division III Men's Soccer Tournament	Connecticut College Camels	Amherst Mammoths	1st	—
United States	2021 NAIA Men's Soccer Championship	Keiser Seahawks	Mobile Rams	1st	—

== Women's university leagues ==
=== CONCACAF ===
Nation	League	Champion	Second place	Title	Last honour
Canada	2021 U Sports Women's Soccer Championship	MacEwan Griffins	Trinity Western Spartans	1st	—
United States	2020 NCAA Division I Women's Soccer Tournament (Note: Held in spring 2021 instead of the normal schedule of fall 2020 due to COVID-19 issues.)	Santa Clara Broncos	Florida State Seminoles	2nd	2001
United States	2020 NAIA Women's Soccer Championship	Keiser Seahawks	William Carey Crusaders	2nd	2019
United States	2021 NCAA Division I Women's Soccer Tournament	Florida State Seminoles	BYU Cougars	3rd	2018
United States	2021 NCAA Division II Women's Soccer Tournament	Grand Valley State Lakers	Saint Rose Golden Knights	7th	2019
United States	2021 NCAA Division III Women's Soccer Tournament	Christopher Newport Captains	TCNJ Lions	1st	—
United States	2021 NAIA Women's Soccer Championship	UT Southern FireHawks	William Carey Crusaders	3rd (Note: Previous titles won as the Martin Methodist RedHawks.)	2007

== Youth leagues ==
=== UEFA ===
Nation	League	Champion	Second place	Title	Last honour
Austria	2020–21 Jugendliga U18				
Austria	2020–21 Jugendliga U16				
Austria	2020–21 Jugendliga U15				
Belgium	2020–21 Pro League U21				
Bulgaria	2020–21 Elite U19				
Croatia	2020–21 1. HNL Juniori U19				
(Czech Republic) Czech	2020–21 1. Liga U19				
Denmark	2020–21 U19 Ligaen				
England	2020–21 Professional U18 Development League				
England	2020–21 Professional U23 Development League				
Estonia	2020–21 U19 Eliitliiga				
Finland	2020–21 A-Junior League				
Germany	2020–21 Under 19 Bundesliga				
Germany	2020–21 Under 19 Bayernliga				
Germany	2020–21 Under 17 Bundesliga				
Germany	2020–21 Under 17 Bayernliga				
Greece	2020–21 Superleague U20				
Greece	2020–21 Superleague U17				
Greece	2020–21 Superleague U15				
Hungary	2020–21 U19 League				
Iceland	2020–21 U19 League				
(Republic of Ireland) Ireland	2021 League of Ireland U19 Division				
Israel	2020–21 Israeli Noar Premier League				
Italy	2020–21 Campionato Primavera 1				
Italy	2020–21 Campionato Primavera 2				
Netherlands	2020–21 Eredivisie U19				
Norway	2020–21 Nasjonal U-19 Super League				
Poland	2020–21 Central Youth League U18				
Portugal	2020–21 Juniores U19				
Romania	2020–21 Liga Elitelor U19				
Romania	2020–21 Liga Elitelor U17				
Russia	2020–21 Russian Youth Football League U21				
Serbia	2020–21 U19 League				
Slovakia	2020–21 U19 League				
Slovenia	2020–21 1. SNL				
Spain	2020–21 División de Honor Juvenil de Fútbol				
Sweden	2020–21 U19 League				
Switzerland	2020–21 U18 League				
Turkey	2020–21 U21 Super Lig				
Ukraine	2020–21 Ukrainian Premier League Under-19				
Ukraine	2020–21 Ukrainian Premier League Under-21				

=== AFC ===
Nation	League	Champion	Second place	Title	Last honour
Australia	2020–21 Y-League				
China; *U13.U14.U15 has been omitted	2021 National Youth Super League U19				
China; *U13.U14.U15 has been omitted	2021 National Youth Super League U17				
Chinese Taipei; *U15 has been omitted	2021 Taiwan Youth Football League U18				
Hong Kong	2020–21 Hong Kong Junior Football League				
Iran	2020–21 Iran U23 League				
Japan	2021 JFA U-18 football League				
Saudi Arabia	2020–21 U19 Youth League	Al-Hilal	Al-Ahli	11th	2016–17
Saudi Arabia	2020–21 U17 Youth League	Al-Fateh	Al-Nassr	1st	–
Saudi Arabia	2020–21 U15 Youth League	Al-Ahli	Al-Hilal	1st	–
Saudi Arabia	2020–21 U13 Youth League	Al-Ittihad	Al-Hilal	1st	–

=== CAF ===
Nation	League	Champion	Second place	Title	Last honour
Algeria	2020–21 U21 League 1				

=== CONCACAF ===
Nation	League	Champion	Second place	Title	Last honour
Canada	2020–21 Canadian Junior Football League				
Mexico	2020–21 U17 League				
United States	2020–21 US Youth Soccer League				

=== CONMEBOL ===
Nation	League	Champion	Second place	Title	Last honour
Argentina	2020–21 Liga Argentina de Futbol Infantil Juvenil				
Brazil	2021 Campeonato Brasileiro Sub-20				

=== OFC ===
Nation	League	Champion	Second place	Title	Last honour
New Zealand	2021 National Youth League				

== Deaths ==
=== January ===
- 1 January –
  - Clint Boulton, 72, English footballer (Port Vale, Torquay United).
  - Bernard Guignedoux, 73, French football player (Paris Saint-Germain, Monaco) and manager (Valenciennes).
- 2 January –
  - Cléber Eduardo Arado, 48, Brazilian footballer (Kyoto Purple Sanga, Coritiba), COVID-19.
  - Miquel Ferrer, 89, Spanish footballer (FC Barcelona, CD Condal, Real Oviedo).
  - Ryder Mofokeng, 68, South African football player (Kaizer Chiefs).
  - Yuri Saukh, 69, Russian football player (SKA Rostov, CSKA Moscow, Soviet Union national team) and manager.
- 5 January –
  - Colin Bell, 74, English footballer (Bury, Manchester City, national team).
  - Brandãozinho, 90, Brazilian footballer (Palmeiras, Celta de Vigo).
  - Tyberii Korponai, 62, Ukrainian football player and manager (Karpaty Lviv, Zakarpattia Uzhhorod, Kremin Kremenchuk).
- 6 January –
  - Mircea Bolba, 59, Romanian football player (Politehnica Timișoara, Bihor Oradea) and manager (Olimpia Satu Mare).
  - Ferdinand Kolarik, 83, Austrian footballer (Admira Wien, national team).
  - Thanasis Papazoglou, 67, Greek footballer (PAS Giannina, national team).
- 7 January –
  - Alex Apolinário, 24, Brazilian footballer (Alverca, Cruzeiro), cardiac arrest.
  - Cassim Louis, 73, Saint Lucian football manager (national team).
- 8 January –
  - Otto Geisert, 81, German footballer (Karlsruhe, Kaiserslautern).
  - Marian Kondratowicz, 79, Polish footballer (Odra Opole).
  - Wojciech Przybylski, 81, Polish football player (Broń Radom) and manager (Lechia Gdańsk, Al-Jaish).
- 9 January –
  - Harry Brüll, 85, Dutch footballer (Rapid JC Heerlen, Fortuna Sittard, national team).
  - Llorenç Rifé, 82, Spanish football player (Barcelona, Deportivo de La Coruña).
- 10 January –
  - Arthur Bramley, 91, English footballer (Mansfield Town).
  - Pedro Casado, 83, Spanish footballer (Real Madrid, Sabadell, national team).
  - Tosh Chamberlain, 86, English footballer (Fulham, Dover Athletic, Gravesend and Northfleet).
  - Avelino Chaves, 89, Spanish football player (Real Zaragoza) and executive.
  - Tony Gregory, 83, English footballer (Luton Town, Watford).
  - Bobby Kellard, 77, English football player (Southend United, Portsmouth, Crystal Palace) and manager.
  - Christopher Maboulou, 30, French-Congolese footballer (Châteauroux, Bastia, PAS Giannina), heart attack.
  - Josep Antoni Noya, 81, Spanish footballer (Sabadell, Atlético Madrid).
  - Walter Taibo, 89, Uruguayan footballer (Huracán, Nacional, national team).
- 11 January –
  - Fabio Enzo, 74, Italian footballer (Roma, Cesena, Novara), complications from COVID-19.
  - Gothard Kokott, 77, Polish football manager (Raków Częstochowa, Ruch Radzionków).
- 12 January – Per Martinsen, 84, Norwegian footballer (Lisleby, Fredrikstad, national team).
- 14 January – José Luis Caballero, 65, Mexican Olympic footballer (1976).
- 15 January –
  - Geoff Barnett, 74, English footballer (Everton, Arsenal, Minnesota Kicks), complications from COVID-19.
  - Aleksandr Nikitin, 59, Russian football player (Torpedo Volzhsky, SKA Rostov-on-Don, Rotor Volgograd) and manager.
- 16 January –
  - György Handel, 61, Hungarian footballer (MTK-VM, Rába ETO, national team), COVID-19.
  - Sergei Rodin, 39, Russian footballer (CSKA Moscow, Sportakademklub Moscow, Sokol Saratov).
- 17 January – Roger Machin, 94, French football referee.
- 18 January – Dani Shmulevich-Rom, 80, Israeli footballer (Maccabi Haifa, national team), cancer.
- 19 January –
  - José Alves, 86, Brazilian footballer (Botafogo, Corinthians, América).
  - Gordon Galley, 90, English footballer (Darlington, Sheffield Wednesday) and police officer.
  - Gustavo Peña, 78, Mexican football player (Monterrey, national team) and manager (Leones Negros), COVID-19.
- 20 January –
  - John Jeffers, 52, English footballer (Port Vale, Shrewsbury Town, Stockport County).
  - Peter Swan, 84, English footballer (Sheffield Wednesday, Matlock Town, national team).
- 21 January – Calixto Avena, 77, Colombian footballer (Millonarios, Atlético Junior, national team), COVID-19.
- 22 January –
  - Luton Shelton, 35, Jamaican footballer (Harbour View, Vålerenga, national team), complications from amyotrophic lateral sclerosis.
  - Johnny Williams, 73, English footballer (Watford, Colchester United, Margate).
- 23 January –
  - Abukari Gariba, 81, Ghanaian Olympic footballer (1968, 1972).
  - Peter Gillott, 85, English footballer (Barnsley, Chelmsford City).
- 24 January –
  - Jóhannes Eðvaldsson, 70, Icelandic footballer (Celtic, Motherwell, national team).
  - Barrie Mitchell, 73, Scottish footballer (Dunfermline Athletic, Aberdeen, Tranmere Rovers).
  - Ron Rafferty, 86, English footballer (Grimsby Town, Aldershot, Portsmouth).
  - Notable Brazilians who died in the 2021 Palmas FR plane crash:
    - Marcus Molinari, 23, footballer (Tupi, Ipatinga, Tupynambás).
    - Guilherme Noé, 28, footballer (Batatais, Rio Preto, Ipatinga).
    - Ranule, 27, footballer (Atlético Itapemirim, Democrata, Resende).
- 25 January –
  - David Bright, 64, Botswanan football manager (Mogoditshane Fighters, Cape Town, national team), complications from COVID-19.
  - Maryan Synakowski, 84, French footballer (Sedan, Union SG, national team).
- 26 January –
  - John Mortimore, 86, English football player (Chelsea) and manager (Benfica, Belenenses).
  - Jozef Vengloš, Slovak footballer and manager (born 1936)
- 27 January –
  - José Cruz, 68, Honduran footballer (Motagua, Real España, national team), COVID-19.
  - Mehrdad Minavand, 45, Iranian football player (Pas, Persepolis, national team) and manager, COVID-19.
- 28 January –
  - Leslie Brown, 84, English footballer (Dulwich Hamlet).
  - Eddie Connachan, 85, Scottish footballer (Dunfermline Athletic, Middlesbrough, national team).
  - Yvon Douis, 85, French footballer (Lille, AS Monaco, national team), COVID-19.
  - John Grant, 89, Scottish footballer (Hibernian, national team).
- 29 January –
  - Roberto Frojuello, 83, Brazilian footballer (São Paulo, River Plate, Colo-Colo).
  - Varol Ürkmez, 84, Turkish footballer (Beşiktaş, Altay, national team).
- 31 January –
  - John Gibbons, 95, English footballer (QPR, Ipswich Town, Tottenham Hotspur), COVID-19.
  - Justo Tejada, 88, Spanish footballer (Barcelona, Real Madrid, national team).

=== February ===
- 1 February – Peter Hindley, 76, English footballer (Nottingham Forest, Coventry City, Peterborough United), dementia.
- 3 February –
  - Ali Ansarian, 43, Iranian footballer (Persepolis, Shahrdari Tabriz, national team), COVID-19.
  - Benito Boldi, 86, Italian footballer (Catania, Cesena, Biellese), complications from COVID-19.
  - Nilson Borges, 79, Brazilian footballer (Portuguesa-SP, Atlético Paranaense).
  - Norbert Owona, 70, Cameroonian footballer (Union Douala, national team).
- 4 February –
  - Santiago García, 30, Uruguayan footballer (Nacional, River Plate-UY, Godoy Cruz), suicide by gunshot.
  - Ben Hannigan, 77, Irish footballer (Shelbourne, Wrexham, Dundalk).
- 5 February – Wim Vrösch, 75, Dutch football player (Sparta Rotterdam, Fortuna Sittard) and manager (Metalurh Donetsk).
- 6 February –
  - Abdelkhalek Louzani, 75, Moroccan footballer (Anderlecht, K.V.V. Crossing Elewijt, Olympic Charleroi), COVID-19.
  - Columb McKinley, 70, Scottish footballer (Airdrieonians, Dumbarton).
  - Ken Roberts, 84, Welsh football player (Aston Villa) and manager (Chester City).
- 7 February –
  - Mario Osbén, 70, Chilean footballer (Colo-Colo, Cobreloa, national team), heart attack.
  - Lula Pereira, 64, Brazilian footballer (Sport Recife, Santa Cruz, Ceará) and manager (Flamengo).
  - Whelan Ward, 91, English footballer (Bradford City, King's Lynn).
- 8 February –
  - Tony Collins, 94, English football player (Sheffield Wednesday, Watford) and manager (Rochdale).
  - Graham Day, 67, English footballer (Bristol Rovers, Portland Timbers).
- 9 February – Yisa Sofoluwe, 53, Nigerian footballer (Abiola Babes, national team), COVID-19.
- 10 February –
  - Dai Davies, 72, Welsh footballer (Wrexham, Everton, national team), pancreatic cancer.
  - Pachín, 82, Spanish football player (Real Madrid, national team) and manager (Hércules).
- 11 February –
  - John James, 72, English footballer (Port Vale, Chester City, Tranmere Rovers).
  - John Kirkham, 79, English footballer (Wolverhampton Wanderers, Peterborough United, Exeter City).
  - Mladen Vranković, 83, Croatian football player (HNK Rijeka, Kansas City Spurs) and manager (NK Orijent).
- 12 February –
  - Gianni Beschin, 67, Italian football referee.
  - Celso Güity, 63, Honduran footballer (Marathón, Sula, national team), cancer.
  - Norman Jukes, 88, English footballer (York City).
  - Maurizio Mattei, 78, Italian football referee, COVID-19.
- 13 February – Alan Woan, 90, English footballer (Northampton Town, Crystal Palace, Aldershot).
- 15 February –
  - Leopoldo Luque, 71, Argentine footballer (River Plate, Unión, national team), world champion (1978), COVID-19.
  - Kenny McDevitt, 91, English footballer (Tranmere Rovers).
  - José Pedrozo, 38, Paraguayan footballer (Antofagasta, San Marcos de Arica), traffic collision.
- 17 February –
  - Özcan Arkoç, 81, Turkish footballer (Hamburger SV, Beşiktaş, national team).
  - John Manning, 80, English footballer (Tranmere Rovers, Barnsley).
  - Martí Vergés, 86, Spanish footballer (España Industrial, Barcelona, national team).
- 19 February –
  - Faisal Abdulaziz, 53, Bahraini footballer (Muharraq, national team).
  - Ebba Andersson, 85, Swedish footballer (Öxabäcks, national team).
  - Fousiya Mampatta, 52, Indian football player and manager, cancer.
  - Silvio Sérafin, 82, French footballer (FC Nancy, Angers SCO, Angoulême-Soyaux Charente).
- 20 February – Mauro Bellugi, 71, Italian footballer (Inter Milan, Bologna, national team), complications from COVID-19.
- 22 February – Jack Bolton, 79, Scottish footballer (Ipswich Town, Raith Rovers, Dumbarton).
- 23 February –
  - Harry Clark, 88, English footballer (Darlington, Hartlepool United).
  - Willy Ta Bi, 21, Ivorian footballer (national team), liver cancer.
- 25 February –
  - Albert Bers, 89, Belgian footballer (Sint-Truidense V.V.) and football coach (Belgium women's national team).
  - Rafi Levi, 83, Israeli footballer (Maccabi Tel Aviv, Sydney Hakoah, national team).
  - Finn Sterobo, 87, Danish footballer (Odense Boldklub, national team).
  - Ton Thie, 76, Dutch footballer (ADO Den Haag, San Francisco Golden Gate Gales).
- 26 February – Horacio Moráles, 77, Argentine Olympic footballer (1964).
- 27 February – Dante Crippa, 83, Italian footballer (Brescia, Juventus, S.P.A.L.), complications from COVID-19.
- 28 February – Glenn Roeder, 65, English footballer and manager (Queens Park Rangers, Newcastle United, West Ham United), brain tumour.

=== March ===
- 3 March – Wilhelm Eliassen, 85, Norwegian footballer (Frigg Oslo FK, national team).
- 4 March –
  - Phil Chisnall, 78, English footballer (Manchester United, Liverpool, Southend United).
  - Tengiz Sichinava, 48, Georgian football player (Dinamo Batumi, national team) and manager (Gagra).
  - Willie Whigham, 81, Scottish footballer (Albion Rovers, Falkirk, Middlesbrough), pneumonia.
- 5 March – Mickey Lewis, 56, English footballer (West Bromwich Albion, Derby County, Oxford United), cancer.
- 6 March –
  - Franco Acosta, 25, Uruguayan footballer (Fénix, Villarreal B, Plaza Colonia), drowned.
  - Konrad Kornek, 84, Polish footballer (Odra Opole, national team).
- 7 March – Mirko Pavinato, 86, Italian footballer (Bologna, Vicenza), kidney problems aggravated by COVID-19.
- 9 March –
  - Agustín Balbuena, 75, Argentine footballer (Colón de Santa Fe, Independiente).
  - Micky Brown, 76, English footballer (Millwall, Colchester United).
  - Bob Graves, 78, English footballer (Lincoln City).
  - Marino Lombardo, 70, Italian footballer (Torino, Cesena, Pistoiese), heart attack.
  - Tommy Troelsen, 80, Danish footballer, Olympic silver medalist (1960) and television presenter.
- 10 March –
  - Mario Boccalatte, 87, Italian footballer (Biellese, Reggiana).
  - Ron Phoenix, 91, English footballer (Manchester City, Rochdale).
- 11 March – Jimmy Stevenson, 74, Scottish footballer (Hibernian, Southend United, Margate).
- 12 March –
  - Gérard Aygoui, 84, French footballer (Olympique de Marseille, national team).
  - Uruguay Graffigna, 73, Uruguayan-Chilean footballer (San Luis de Quillota, Los Angeles Aztecs, PEC Zwolle), complications from COVID-19 and Alzheimer's disease.
- 13 March – Rostyslav Bahdasarov, 27, Ukrainian footballer (Kolos Kovaliva, Stal Dniprodzerzhynsk), heart disease.
- 15 March –
  - Daniel Eon, 81, French footballer (Nantes, national team).
  - Gilmar Fubá, 45, Brazilian footballer (Corinthians), bone marrow cancer.
- 16 March –
  - Micky Dulin, 85, English footballer (Tottenham Hotspur).
  - Aarón Gamal, 62, Mexican footballer (Deportivo Neza, Tigres, national team), heart disease.
  - Ahmed Mghirbi, 74, Tunisian footballer (Stade Tunisien).
  - Erhan Önal, 63, Turkish footballer (Bayern Munich, Galatasaray, national team).
  - Patrick Viot, 68, French footballer (US Orléans).
  - Laurent Zahui, 60, Ivorian footballer (national team).
- 17 March – Steve Jagielka, 43, English footballer (Shrewsbury Town, Accrington Stanley), drug toxicity.
- 20 March – Peter Lorimer, 74, Scottish footballer (Leeds United, national team).
- 21 March – Terry Melling, 81, English footballer (Slough Town, Newcastle United, Mansfield Town).
- 22 March –
  - Barnabas Imenger, 45, Nigerian footballer (Lobi Stars, national team).
  - Alan Slough, 73, English footballer (Luton Town, Fulham, Peterborough United).
  - Frank Worthington, 72, English footballer (Huddersfield Town, Leicester City, national team).
- 24 March –
  - Enrique Chazarreta, 73, Argentine footballer (San Lorenzo, Avignon, national team).
  - Derek Hawksworth, 93, English footballer (Bradford City, Sheffield United, Huddersfield Town).
- 26 March – Hossein Khodaparast, 82, Iranian Olympic footballer (1964).
- 27 March –
  - Alex Kiddie, 93, Scottish footballer (Aberdeen).
  - Derek Ufton, 92, English cricketer (Kent) and footballer (Charlton Athletic, national team).
- 30 March – Maurizio Moretti, 76, Italian footballer (S.P.A.L.), COVID-19.
- 31 March –
  - Lee Collins, 32, English footballer (Port Vale, Northampton Town, Mansfield Town), suicide by hanging.
  - Erwin Piechowiak, 84, German footballer (HSV).

=== April ===
- 2 April – Valentin Afonin, 81, Russian footballer (SKA Rostov-on-Don, CSKA Moscow).
- 3 April – Remus Câmpeanu, 82, Romanian footballer (Universitatea Cluj).
- 4 April –
  - Adolf Kabo, 61, Indonesian footballer (Perseman Manokwari, national team).
  - Alfonso Quijano, 78, Ecuadorian footballer (Barcelona S.C., national team).
- 8 April –
  - Doug Holden, 90, English footballer (Bolton Wanderers, Preston North End, national team).
  - Ton van den Hurk, 88, Dutch footballer (FC Eindhoven, VVV-Venlo, Sittardia).
  - Ñito, 81, Spanish footballer (Tenerife, Valencia, Granada).
  - Horst Trimhold, 80, German footballer (Borussia Dortmund, FSV Frankfurt, national team).
- 9 April –
  - Maryan Bakalarczyk, 93, Polish-Belgian footballer (R.F.C. Tilleur, R. Charleroi S.C., Standard Liège).
  - Daniel Benítez, 33, Venezuelan footballer (Deportivo Táchira, Deportivo La Guaira), cancer.
  - Roman Kanafotskyi, 83, Ukrainian footballer (Dnipro, Kryvbas Kryvyi Rih, Elektrometalurh-NZF Nikopol).
  - Wolfgang Kaniber, 81, German footballer (Fortuna Düsseldorf, VfL Osnabrück, RC Strasbourg).
  - Julien Van Roosbroeck, 85, Belgian footballer (national team).
- 11 April –
  - Colin Baker, 86, Welsh footballer (Cardiff City, national team).
  - Füzuli Javadov, 70, Azerbaijani footballer (SKA Rostov-on-Don, Neftçi PFK, Daugava Riga), COVID-19.
- 12 April – Peter Goy, 82, English footballer (Arsenal, Southend United, Watford).
- 13 April –
  - Jamal Al-Qabendi, 62, Kuwaiti footballer (Kazma, national team), complications from diabetes.
  - Hans-Dieter Tippenhauer, 77, German footballer (Fortuna Düsseldorf, Arminia Bielefeld, Borussia Dortmund).
- 15 April – Poul Bilde, 83, Danish footballer (Vejle, national team).
- 16 April –
  - Hussain Ahmed, 89, Indian Olympic footballer (1956), COVID-19.
  - Claude Jamet, 91, French footballer (LB Châteauroux).
- 17 April –
  - Mario Pini, 82, Uruguayan footballer (Montevideo Wanderers).
  - Wayne Talkes, 68, English footballer (Southampton, AFC Bournemouth).
- 18 April – Tremaine Stewart, 33, Jamaican footballer (Aalesund, Waterhouse, national team).
- 19 April –
  - Willy van der Kuijlen, 74, Dutch footballer (PSV, MVV, national team), complications from Alzheimer's disease.
  - Viktor Shuvalov, 97, Russian ice hockey player and footballer (VVS Moscow), Olympic champion (1956), COVID-19.
  - Marin Voinea, 85, Romanian footballer (Progresul București, Siderurgistul Galați, national team).
- 20 April –
  - Listianto Raharjo, 50, Indonesian footballer (Pelita Jaya, national team), heart attack.
  - Alfred Teinitzer, 91, Austrian footballer (SK Rapid Wien, LASK Linz, national team).
  - Panagiotis Xoblios, 25, Greek footballer (Veria, Panegialios, Kallithea), heart attack.
- 21 April –
  - Alfredo Graciani, 56, Argentine footballer (Boca Juniors, Racing Club, Deportivo Español), heart attack.
  - Gerry Mackey, 87, Irish footballer (Shamrock Rovers).
- 22 April –
  - Jean-Pierre Kress, 91, French footballer (national team).
  - Roy Strandbakke, 90, Norwegian footballer (Raufoss, national team).
- 23 April – Tuncay Becedek, 78, Turkish footballer (Fenerbahçe, İzmirspor, national team).
- 25 April –
  - Ian Hamilton, 80, English footballer (Bristol Rovers).
  - Hamid Jasemian, 84, Iranian footballer (Shahin, Persepolis), COVID-19.
- 26 April – Peter Gelson, 79, English footballer (Brentford, Hillingdon Borough, Hounslow).
- 28 April –
  - Clyde Leon, 37, Trinidadian footballer (Arima Fire, W Connection, national team).
  - Steve Perks, 58, English footballer (Shrewsbury Town).
  - Chelato Uclés, 80, Honduran footballer (Atlético Español) and coach (Real España, national team), heart attack.
- 29 April –
  - Frank Brogan, 78, Scottish footballer (Celtic, Ipswich Town, Halifax Town).
  - Zhang Enhua, 48, Chinese footballer (Dalian Wanda, Grimsby Town, national team).

=== May ===
- 1 May – Ricardo Alberto Ramírez, 48, Argentine footballer, complications from COVID-19.
- 2 May –
  - Lolly Debattista, 91, Maltese footballer (Floriana, Ħamrun Spartans, Valletta).
  - Andrzej Możejko, 72, Polish footballer (Widzew Łódź).
- 3 May –
  - Rafael Albrecht, 79, Argentine footballer (San Lorenzo, Club León, national team), COVID-19.
  - Alan Keely, 38, Irish footballer (Shelbourne).
  - Kamel Tchalabi, 74, Algerian footballer (USM Alger, national team).
- 4 May –
  - Steve Conroy, 64, English footballer (Sheffield United, Rotherham United, Rochdale).
  - Omar Hugo Gómez, 65, Argentine footballer (Quilmes Atlético Club), COVID-19.
  - Alan McLoughlin, 54, Irish footballer (Portsmouth, Swindon Town, Republic of Ireland) cancer.
- 5 May –
  - Abelardo González, 76, Spanish footballer (UP Langreo, Sporting de Gijón, Valencia CF).
  - Bertil Johansson, 86, Swedish footballer (IFK Göteborg, national team).
- 6 May – Christophe Revault, 49, French footballer (Paris Saint-Germain, Toulouse, Le Havre).
- 7 May –
  - Martín Pando, 86, Argentine footballer (Argentinos Juniors, River Plate, national team).
  - John Sludden, 56, Scottish footballer (St Johnstone, Ayr United).
- 8 May –
  - Georgi Dimitrov, 62, Bulgarian football player (CSKA Sofia, national team) and manager (Marek Dupnitsa), cancer.
  - Sanda Oumarou, 38, Cameroonian footballer (Coton Sport, Al Masry).
- 9 May – James Dean, 35, English footballer (Stalybridge Celtic, Chorley, Halifax Town). (body discovered on this date)
- 10 May –
  - Sami Hasan Al Nash, 64, Yemeni football manager (national team), COVID-19.
  - Fortunato Franco, 84, Indian footballer (Salgaocar, Maharashtra, national team).
  - Néstor Montelongo, 66, Uruguayan footballer (national team), 1983 Copa América winner.
- 12 May –
  - Jiří Feureisl, 89, Czech footballer (FC Karlovy Vary) and ice hockey player.
  - Dixie Hale, 85, Irish footballer (Swansea Town, Barrow, Workington, Watford).
  - Vadim Logunov, 53, Russian footballer (Metallurg Lipetsk, APK Azov, Krystal Kherson).
  - Ton Pansier, 74, Dutch footballer (XerxesDZB, SV SVV).
  - Ivanildo Rozenblad, 24, Surinamese footballer (S.V. Robinhood).
- 13 May –
  - Ian Brusasco, 92, Australian soccer administrator (president of the Australian Soccer Federation, vice president of the Oceania Football Confederation).
  - Nelson Marcenaro, 68, Uruguayan footballer (national team), 1980 Mundialito winner, heart attack.
  - Eigil Misser, 87, Danish footballer (B 1913, national team).
- 14 May – Torkild Brakstad, 75, Norwegian football player (Molde, national team) and manager (Tromsø).
- 16 May –
  - Hüseyin Er, 36, Turkish-British footballer (İzmirspor), heart attack. (death announced on this date)
  - Samir Hadjaoui, 42, Algerian footballer (ASO Chlef, ES Sétif, national team).
  - Rildo da Costa Menezes, 79, Brazilian football player (Botafogo, national team) and manager (California Kickers).
- 19 May –
  - Serhiy Ferenchak, 37, Ukrainian footballer (Khimik Krasnoperekopsk, Sevastopol, SKChF Sevastopol).
  - Josep Franch, 77, Spanish footballer (FC Barcelona, CE Sabadell FC).
  - Guillermo Sepúlveda, 86, Mexican footballer (Guadalajara, Oro, national team).
- 20 May –
  - Len Badger, 75, English footballer (Sheffield United).
  - Chris Chilton, 77, English footballer (Hull City, Coventry City), complications from dementia.
  - Sándor Puhl, 65, Hungarian football referee, complications from COVID-19.
  - Eric Winstanley, 76, English footballer (Barnsley, Chesterfield).
- 21 May – Dwayne Sandy, 32, Vincentian footballer (Saint Vincent and the Grenadines), gunshot.
- 22 May –
  - Francesc Arnau, 46, Spanish football player (Barcelona, Málaga) and executive (Real Oviedo), suicide.
  - Mels Kenetaev, 75, Kazakh footballer (Dinamo Tselinograd).
- 25 May –
  - Alfonso Barasoain, 63, Spanish football player and manager (Barakaldo, Eibar, Lemona).
  - Arturo Gentili, 85, Italian footballer (Atalanta B.C., Varese Calcio, Triestina Calcio).
  - George Patterson, 86, English footballer (Hull City, York City).
  - Amichai Shoham, 99, Israeli footballer (Hapoel Petah Tikva F.C., national team).
- 26 May – Tarcisio Burgnich, 82, Italian footballer (Internazionale, national team) and manager.
- 27 May –
  - Karl-Heinz Heddergott, 94, German football manager (FC Köln, Egypt national team, Oman national team).
  - Zdenko Vukasović, 79, Croatian footballer (Anderlecht, Cercle Brugge, Lokeren).
- 28 May – Zablon Amanaka, 45, Kenyan footballer (Željezničar Sarajevo, Mahakama, national team).
- 30 May –
  - Tonnie van As, 93, Dutch footballer (SBV Vitesse).
  - John Carpenter, 84, Irish referee and player (St Patrick's Athletic).
- 31 May – Colin Appleton, 85, English football player (Leicester City, Charlton Athletic) and manager (Swansea City).

=== June ===
- 1 June –
  - Silvio Francesconi, 68, Italian football player and manager, COVID-19.
  - Adnan Al Sharqi, 79, Lebanese football player (Al Ansar) and manager (Al Nahda, national team).
  - Samadagha Shikhlarov, 65, Azerbaijani footballer (Khazar Sumgayit, Neftçi Baku, FK Ganca), traffic collision.
- 2 June –
  - Odero Gon, 88, Italian footballer (Palmanova, Udinese, Vittorio Falmec).
  - Stanislav Lunin, 28, Kazakh footballer (Shakhter Karagandy, Kairat), cardiac arrest.
  - Giuseppe Perrino, 29, Italian footballer (Ebolitana, Battipagliese, Bellaria Igea Marina), heart attack.
  - Ottorino Sartor, 75, Peruvian footballer (Defensor Arica, Atlético Chalaco, national team).
- 3 June –
  - Alan Miller, 51, English footballer (Arsenal, Middlesbrough, West Bromwich Albion).
  - Ezio Motta, 90, Italian football referee (Serie A).
  - Murat Šaran, 71, Bosnian footballer (Sarajevo, Rijeka, Levante).
- 4 June –
  - Roberto Depietri, 55, Argentine footballer (Club Olimpo, Deportivo Toluca), COVID-19.
  - Roberto Derlin, 78, Italian football player (Genoa, Spezia Calcio) and manager (Sestri Levante).
  - Loris Dominissini, 59, Italian football player (Udinese, Reggiana) and manager (Reggiana), COVID-19.
- 5 June –
  - Pedro Taberner, 74, Spanish footballer (RCD Mallorca, Celta de Vigo).
- 7 June –
  - Paul Cahill, 65, English footballer (Portsmouth, California Surf).
  - Fulvio Varglien, 85, Italian footballer (Triestina, Livorno, Pordenone).
  - Yoo Sang-chul, 49, South Korean footballer (Ulsan Hyundai, Yokohama F. Marinos, national team), pancreatic cancer.
- 8 June –
  - John Angus, 82, English footballer (Burnley, national team).
  - Gennadi Syomin, 53, Russian football player (FShM Torpedo Moscow, Fakel Voronezh) and manager (Dynamo Voronezh).
- 9 June – Diogo Correa de Oliveira, 38, Brazilian footballer (Flamengo, Kalmar, Hokkaido Consadole Sapporo), traffic collision.
- 10 June –
  - Neno, 59, Portuguese footballer (Benfica, Vitória Guimarães, national team), heart attack.
  - Gheorghe Staicu, 85, Romanian football player (Steaua București) and manager (Olimpia Satu Mare, Universitatea Cluj).
- 15 June – Aleksandr Averyanov, 72, Russian football player (Lokomotiv Moscow) and manager (Okean Nakhodka, Dynamo Saint Petersburg).
- 17 June –
  - Mike Burgess, 89, Canadian-born English footballer (AFC Bournemouth).
  - Kamil Ferkhanov, 56, Russian footballer (Regar-TadAZ Tursunzoda, Turbostroitel Kaluga, Volga Ulyanovsk), heart attack.
  - Robert Lima, 48, Uruguayan football player (Peñarol, Chacarita) and manager (Juticalpa), cardiac arrest.
  - Tubilandu Ndimbi, 73, Congolese footballer (AS Vita Club, national team).
- 18 June – Giampiero Boniperti, 92, Italian footballer (Juventus, national team) and politician, MEP (1994–1999), heart failure.
- 19 June – Spencer Whelan, 49, English footballer (Chester City, Shrewsbury Town).
- 20 June –
  - Lucas Pereira, 39, Brazilian footballer (AC Ajaccio), COVID-19.
  - Peter Rock, 79, German footballer (FC Carl Zeiss Jena, East Germany).
  - Luis del Sol, 86, Spanish footballer (Real Madrid, Juventus, national team) and coach.
- 21 June – Jack Bertolini, 87, Scottish footballer (Workington, Brighton & Hove Albion, Stirling Albion).
- 22 June –
  - Giancarlo Amadeo, 87, Italian football player (Pro Patria) and manager (Borgosesia).
  - Yaroslav Dumanskyi, 61, Ukrainian footballer (Spartak Ivano-Frankivsk, Karpaty Lviv, Dynamo Kyiv).
  - Vitaliy Shalychev, 74, Ukrainian football player (Shakhtar Donetsk, Kolhozchi Aşgabat) and coach (FC Ocean Kerch).
  - Sergei Shaposhnikov, 98, Russian football player (Ska-Khabarovsk) and manager (CSKA Moscow, SKA Odesa).
- 23 June –
  - Bart Van Lancker, 48, Belgian football coach (KV Kortrijk, Sint-Truiden, OH Leuven), cancer.
  - Daniel Vélez, 47, Colombian footballer (DIM, Atlético Bucaramanga, Santa Fe), COVID-19.
- 24 June –
  - Misheck Chidzambwa, 66, Zimbabwean football player (Dynamos, national team) and manager (Chapungu United).
  - Ludwig Müller, 79, German footballer (1. FC Nürnberg, Hertha, West Germany national team).
  - Keith Rutter, 89, English footballer (Queens Park Rangers, Colchester United). (death announced on this date)
  - Eleazar Soria, 73, Peruvian footballer (Universitario, Independiente, national team) and lawyer.
- 25 June – Marcos Ferrufino, 58, Bolivian football player (Club Bolívar, national team) and manager (San José), COVID-19.
- 26 June – Jhon Mario Ramírez, 49, Colombian footballer (national team), COVID-19.
- 29 June –
  - Jock Aird, 94, Scottish footballer (Burnley, national team).
  - Petros Leventakos, 75, Greek footballer (Panachaiki, Ethnikos Piraeus, PAS Giannina).
  - Vicky Peretz, 68, Israeli football player (Maccabi Tel Aviv, national team) and manager (Hakoah Amidar Ramat Gan).
- 30 June – Inge Danielsson, 80, Swedish footballer (Helsingborg, Ajax, national team).

=== July ===
- 1 July – Christian Bottollier, 92, French footballer (FC Nancy).
- 2 July – Giuliano Zoratti, 73, Italian football player (Pro Gorizia) and manager (Reggina, Avellino), cancer.
- 3 July – Waldemar Mühlbächer, 83, German footballer (BFC Dynamo, East Germany national team).
- 4 July – Hans-Jürgen Ripp, 75, German footballer (Hamburger SV, Lüneburger SK).
- 5 July –
  - Franco Gallina, 76, Italian football player (Virtus Entella, Cesena, Genoa) and manager.
  - Rubén Israel, 65, Uruguayan football manager (Rentistas, Club Libertad, Barcelona de Ecuador).
  - Alfredo Obberti, 75, Argentine footballer (Newell's Old Boys, Grêmio, national team).
- 6 July – Miguel González, 94, Spanish football player (Atlético Madrid, Real Zaragoza, national team) and coach.
- 7 July –
  - Józef Gałeczka, 82, Polish footballer (Piast Gliwice, Zagłębie Sosnowiec).
  - Smaïn Ibrir, 89, Algerian footballer (Le Havre AC, national team).
- 8 July –
  - Jan Caliński, 72, Polish football manager (Śląsk Wrocław).
  - Max Griggs, 82, English footwear and football executive, owner of Dr. Martens and Rushden & Diamonds F.C.
- 9 July – Paul Mariner, 68, English footballer (national team, Ipswich Town), brain cancer.
- 10 July –
  - Jimmy Gabriel, 80, Scottish football player (Everton, Southampton, national team) and manager.
  - Natale Nobili, 85, Italian football player (S.P.A.L., Pro Vercelli, Alessandria) and coach.
- 11 July –
  - Dave Dunmore, 87, English footballer (Leyton Orient, York City, Tottenham Hotspur).
  - Charlie Gallagher, 80, Scottish-Irish footballer (Celtic, Dumbarton, Ireland national team).
  - Ernie Moss, 71, English footballer (Chesterfield, Mansfield Town, Lincoln City).
  - Attilio Prior, 86, Italian footballer (Vicenza).
- 12 July –
  - Mick Bates, 73, English footballer (Leeds United, Walsall, Bradford City).
  - Francisco Caló, 74, Portuguese footballer (Sporting, Tomar, national team).
  - Erich Hasenkopf, 86, Austrian footballer (Wiener Sport-Club, national team).
  - Wilson Jones, 87, Spanish footballer (Real Madrid, Real Zaragoza, Racing de Santander).
  - Mahmoud Shakibi, 94, Iranian footballer (Shahin, national team), heart attack.
- 13 July –
  - Cha Gi-suk, 34, South Korean footballer (Gyeongju Citizen, Bucheon FC 1995), kidney failure.
  - Alberto Dualib, 101, Brazilian businessman and football executive, chairman of Sport Club Corinthians Paulista (1993–2007).
- 14 July – Ken Ronaldson, 75, Scottish footballer (Aberdeen, Bristol Rovers, Gillingham).
- 15 July – Keith Bambridge, 85, English footballer (Rotherham United, Darlington, Halifax Town).
- 16 July –
  - Yves Boutet, 84, French footballer (Stade Rennais, Lorient).
  - Hamid Reza Sadr, 65, Iranian football and film critic, cancer.
- 17 July –
  - George Curtis, 82, English football player (Coventry City, Aston Villa) and manager (Coventry City).
  - Williams Martínez, 38, Uruguayan footballer (Defensor Sporting, Cerro, national team), suicide.
  - Milan Živadinović, 76, Serbian football player (Vardar, Rijeka, Crvenka) and manager.
- 18 July – Jeff Barmby, 78, English footballer (York City, Goole Town, Scarborough).
- 19 July – Kurt Clemens, 95, German footballer (1. FC Saarbrücken, FC Nancy, Saarland national team).
- 20 July –
  - Daniel Escudero, 79, Chilean footballer (Everton, Unión La Calera, San Luis de Quillota).
  - Billy Reid, 83, Scottish footballer (Motherwell, Airdrie).
  - Noureddine Saâdi, 71, Algerian football manager (JS Kabylie, Al Ahli Tripoli, ASO Chlef), COVID-19.
  - Peter Willis, 83, English football referee.
- 21 July – Tommy Leishman, 83, Scottish footballer (Liverpool, Stranraer, St Mirren).
- 22 July –
  - Terry Neill, 80, Northern Irish footballer (Arsenal, Hull City, national team) and manager (Hull City, Tottenham Hotspur, Arsenal, national team).
  - Ian Palmer, 55, South African footballer (Orlando Pirates), COVID-19 complications.
  - Mike Smith, 83, English football player (Corinthian Casuals) and manager (Wales national team, Egypt national team). (death announced on this date)
- 23 July – Andy Higgins, 61, English footballer (Chester City, Port Vale, Rochdale).
- 26 July –
  - Ally Dawson, 63, Scottish footballer (Rangers, national team).
  - Ivan Toplak, 89, Serbian football player (Red Star Belgrade) and manager (Oakland Clippers, Yugoslavia national team).
- 27 July –
  - Tommy Connolly, 74, Irish football player (Dundalk) and manager.
  - Einar Bruno Larsen, 81, Norwegian footballer (Vålerenga, national team) and Olympic ice hockey player (1964).
- 28 July –
  - Porfirio Armando Betancourt, 63, Honduran footballer (Strasbourg, national team), COVID-19.
  - André Catimba, 74, Brazilian footballer (Ypiranga, Vitória, Grêmio).
  - Volodymyr Dykyi, 59, Ukrainian football player (Karpaty Lviv, Nyva Ternopil) and manager (Volyn Lutsk).
  - Krzysztof Karpiński, 67, Polish footballer (Śląsk Wrocław).
  - Derek Tomkinson, 90, English footballer (Port Vale, Macclesfield Town, Crewe Alexandra).
- 29 July – Zizinho, 59, Brazilian footballer (Club América, Club Necaxa, Monterrey), COVID-19.
- 30 July – Italo Vassallo, 80, Ethiopian footballer (Cotton Factory Club, national team).
- 31 July –
  - Terry Cooper, 77, English footballer (Leeds United, Middlesbrough, Bristol City, Bristol Rovers, national team) and manager (Bristol Rovers, Bristol City, Birmingham City, Exeter City).
  - Yeo Hyo-jin, 38, South Korean footballer (Gimcheon Sangmu, Tochigi SC, Goyang Zaicro), cancer.

=== August ===
- 1 August – Eddie Presland, 78, English footballer (West Ham United, Crystal Palace), cancer.
- 2 August –
  - Luigi Paleari, 79, Italian footballer (Como 1907, A.S.D. Fanfulla).
  - Antonio de la Torre Villalpando, 69, Mexican footballer, (Club América, national team).
- 3 August –
  - Jergé Hoefdraad, 35, Dutch footballer (RKC Waalwijk, Almere City, Telstar), complications from gunshot wounds.
  - Godfred Yeboah, 41, Ghanaian footballer (Asante Kotoko, All Stars, national team).
- 5 August – S. S. Narayan, 86, Indian Olympic footballer (1956, 1960), cardiac arrest.
- 6 August –
  - Francesco Dibenedetto, 80, Italian football manager (Matera Calcio, Bisceglie, U.S.D. Città di Fasano).
  - Salvador Escrihuela, 70, Spanish footballer (Sabadell, Granada, Alavés).
- 7 August –
  - Julio César Anderson, 73, Guatemalan footballer (C.S.D. Municipal, national team).
  - Robbie Cooke, 64, English footballer (Peterborough United, Cambridge United, Brentford), cancer.
- 10 August –
  - Michel Le Flochmoan, 69, French football player and manager (Sedan, R.E. Virton, F91 Dudelange).
  - Dudley Price, 89, Welsh footballer (Swansea City, Hull City, Southend United).
- 12 August – Alfonso Sepúlveda, 82, Chilean footballer (Club Universidad de Chile).
- 13 August –
  - Franck Berrier, 37, French football player (Cannes, Zulte Waregem, Oostende) and manager, heart attack.
  - Bobby Stein, 82, Scottish footballer (Raith Rovers, Montrose).
- 15 August – Gerd Müller, German footballer (born 1945)
- 17 August – Paulão, 51, Angolan footballer (Benfica, Espinho, national team).
- 21 August – Arthur Smith, 106, English footballer (Bury, Leicester City).
- 24 August – Wilfried Van Moer, 76, Belgian footballer (Standard Liège, national team) and manager (national team), cerebral haemorrhage.
- 27 August – Johnny Williamson, 92, English footballer (Manchester City, Blackburn Rovers).

=== September ===
- 2 September – Paul Chillan, 85, French footballer (Nîmes Olympique, national team).
- 19 September – Jimmy Greaves, English footballer (born 1940)
- 20 September – Ken Worden, 78, English coach (Malaysia, Singapore).
- 21 September – Romano Fogli, 83, Italian footballer (Torino, Bologna, A.C. Milan, Catania, national team).

=== October ===
- 1 October –
  - Fred Hill, 81, English footballer (Bolton Wanderers, national team).
  - Paul Linger, 46, English footballer (Charlton Athletic, Brighton & Hove Albion), pancreatic cancer.
  - Sune Sandbring, 93, Swedish footballer (Malmö FF, national team).
  - Brian Sherratt, 77, English footballer (Oxford United, Stoke City, Barnsley).
  - Reg Beresford, 100, English footballer (Aston Villa, Birmingham City, Crystal Palace).
- 3 October – Bernard Tapie, 78, French businessman (president of Olympique de Marseille 1986–1994), stomach cancer.
- 16 October – George Kinnell, 83, Scottish footballer (Aberdeen, Stoke City, Sunderland).

=== November ===
- 1 November – Poerio Mascella, 71, Italian footballer (Varese, Ternana, Pistoiese).
- 4 November –
  - Amela Fetahović, 35, Bosnian footballer (SFK 2000, Spartak Subotica, national team), car crash.
  - Jack Vitty, 98, English footballer (Workington, Brighton & Hove Albion).
- 23 November – Riuler, 23, Brazilian footballer (Shonan Bellmare).
- 26 November – Doug Cowie, 95, Scottish footballer (national team, Dundee, Greenock Morton)
- 28 November – Johnny Hills, 87, English footballer (Tottenham Hotspur).

=== December ===
- 2 December – Tom McGarry, 74, Irish footballer (Limerick, Cork Celtic).
- 3 December – Horst Eckel, German footballer (born 1932)
- 8 December – Alfredo Moreno, 41, Argentine footballer (Necaxa, San Luis, Tijuana), intestinal cancer.
- 20 December –
  - Norberto Boggio, 90, Argentine footballer (Banfield, San Lorenzo de Almagro, Atlante, national team).
  - Heinz Bigler, 72, Swiss footballer (FC St. Gallen) and manager (FC St. Gallen, FC Schaffhausen, FC Gossau, FC Winterthur).
- 26 December –
  - Dorval, 86, Brazilian footballer (Santos, Racing, Palmeiras, Atlético Paranaense, national team).
  - Diego Montiel, 25, Argentine footballer (Atlético de Rafaela), meningitis.
- 28 December –
  - Hugo Maradona, 52, Argentine footballer (Argentinos Juniors, Rayo Vallecano), heart attack.
  - Tibi, 70, Portuguese footballer (Porto, national team).
- 29 December – Christian Gyan, 43, Ghanaian footballer (Feyenoord)
