= Deaths in July 2021 =

The following is a list of notable deaths in July 2021.

Entries for each day are listed alphabetically by surname. A typical entry lists information in the following sequence:

- Name, age, country of citizenship at birth, subsequent country of citizenship (if applicable), reason for notability, cause of death (if known), and reference.

== July 2021 ==
=== 1 ===
- Louis Andriessen, 82, Dutch composer (La Commedia, Writing to Vermeer, Rosa – A Horse Drama).
- Arazi, 32, American-bred French racehorse.
- Noble Banadda, 46, Ugandan chemical engineer, COVID-19.
- Theodore Bestor, 69, American anthropologist, cancer.
- Christian Bottollier, 92, French footballer (FC Nancy).
- Antonio Cantisani, 94, Italian Roman Catholic prelate, bishop and archbishop of Rossano-Cariati (1971–1980) and Catanzaro-Squillace (1980–2003).
- Charles Capper, 76–77, American historian, complications from Parkinson's disease.
- Josh Culbreath, 88, American hurdler, Olympic bronze medalist (1956).
- Bill Danenhauer, 87, American football player (Denver Broncos, Boston Patriots) and coach.
- Yury Dokhoian, 56, Russian chess grandmaster, COVID-19.
- Shashi Bhushan Hazari, 55, Indian politician, Bihar MLA (since 2010), hepatitis B.
- Harriet S. Iglehart, 94, American equestrian and writer, heart failure.
- Anwar Iqbal, 71, Pakistani actor.
- Steve Kekana, 62, South African singer, complications from COVID-19.
- Evgenia Kirichenko, 90, Russian historian.
- Farida Mansurova, 69, Tajikistani physician.
- Mathew D. McCubbins, 64, American political scientist.
- Sanghamitra Mohanty, 68, Indian computer scientist.
- Asma Nabeel, Pakistani screenwriter (Khuda Mera Bhi Hai, Khaani), breast cancer.
- Nyunt Win, 80, Burmese actor (Never Shall We Be Enslaved, Mystery of Snow).
- Marcel Puget, 80, French rugby union player (CA Brive, national team), complications from Alzheimer's disease.
- Ann Rinaldi, 86, American author (An Acquaintance with Darkness, A Break with Charity, Hang a Thousand Trees with Ribbons).
- Philece Sampler, 67, American voice actress (Digimon Adventure, Miraculous: Tales of Ladybug & Cat Noir, The Legend of Korra), heart attack.
- Greg Schaum, 67, American football player (Dallas Cowboys, New England Patriots).
- Kartal Tibet, 82, Turkish actor (Tarkan Versus the Vikings) and film director (Tosun Paşa, Şalvar Davası).
- Eric D. Weitz, 68, American historian.

=== 2 ===
- Gerry Abel, 76, American ice hockey player (Detroit Red Wings).
- Steve Arneil, 86, South African-English karateka.
- Helmut Ashley, 101, Austrian cinematographer (Duel with Death, White Shadows, The Old Fox).
- Juozas Baranauskas, 86, Lithuanian television broadcaster (LRT televizija) and politician, MP (1992–1996).
- Mohamed Nejib Berriche, Tunisian politician, deputy (2004–2009), COVID-19.
- Fereimi Cama, 66, Fijian Anglican prelate, bishop of Polynesia (since 2019).
- Ion Ciocanu, 81, Moldovan literary critic.
- Robert Correia, 82, American politician, member of the Massachusetts House of Representatives (1977–2008) and mayor of Fall River (2008–2010).
- Eric Eldin, 88, British jockey.
- Hazel Erby, 75, American politician, member of the St. Louis County Council (2004–2019), pancreatic cancer.
- Margaret H. George, 93, American politician, member of the Pennsylvania House of Representatives (1977–1980) and author.
- Tony González, 84, Cuban baseball player (Philadelphia Phillies, Atlanta Braves, California Angels).
- Harold A. Gould, 95, American anthropologist.
- Naïm Kattan, 92, Iraqi-born Canadian novelist, essayist and critic.
- Kōbō Kenichi, 47, Japanese sumo wrestler, COVID-19.
- Ali Osman Khan, 74, Bangladeshi politician, MP (1979–1982).
- Omar Lara, 80, Chilean poet and writer.
- Miriam Laserson, 102, Russian-born American actress.
- Elliot Lawrence, 96, American jazz pianist, nine-time Emmy award winner.
- Lehlo Ledwaba, 49, South African boxer, IBF super bantamweight champion (1999–2001), COVID-19.
- Andrew P. Miller, 88, American politician, attorney general of Virginia (1970–1977).
- Mundardjito, 84, Indonesian archeologist, lung infection.
- Jeffrey Northrup, 55, Canadian police officer, traffic collision.
- Bill Ramsey, 90, German-American jazz singer and actor (Music in the Blood, The Adventures of Count Bobby, Old Shatterhand).
- Kenneth A. Randall, 88, American politician.
- William Regnery II, 80, American white supremacy activist, founder of National Policy Institute.
- B. M. Senguttuvan, 80, Indian politician, Tamil Nadu MLA (1996–2001).
- Joyce Shrubbs, 94, British Royal Observer Corps officer.
- Nikolai Slichenko, 86, Russian singer and actor (Hard Happiness, Wedding in Malinovka).
- Manteb Soedharsono, 72, Indonesian wayang puppeteer, COVID-19.
- Jolien Verschueren, 31, Belgian cyclo-cross racer (Pauwels Sauzen–Bingoal), brain cancer.
- Lise Vidal, 43, French Olympic windsurfer (2000).
- Giuliano Zoratti, 73, Italian football player (Pro Gorizia) and manager (Reggina, Avellino), cancer.

=== 3 ===
- Abelardo Alvarado Alcántara, 87, Mexican Roman Catholic prelate, auxiliary bishop of Mexico (1985–2008).
- Bob Beer, 79, Australian adventurer.
- Nigel Brouwers, 44, South African cricketer (Eastern Province, Northerns, South Western Districts), COVID-19.
- Purnell W. Choppin, 91, American virologist.
- Desmond Davis, 95, British film director (Clash of the Titans, Girl with Green Eyes, I Was Happy Here).
- Richard Domba Mady, 68, Congolese Roman Catholic prelate, bishop of Doruma-Dungu (since 1994).
- Antony Eastman, 74, Indian film director (Ambada Njaane!), heart attack.
- Nino Escalera, 91, Puerto Rican baseball player (Cincinnati Reds).
- Franck Abd-Bakar Fanny, 50–51, Ivorian photographer.
- Geoffrey Hutchinson, 87, Barbadian cricketer (national team).
- He Kang, 98, Chinese politician, member of the CCP Central Committee (1982–1992) and minister of agriculture (1988–1990).
- Kenneth John, 83, Vincentian lawyer and newspaper columnist.
- James Kallstrom, 78, American FBI agent and television host (The FBI Files).
- Nikolay Konstantinov, 89, Russian mathematician, COVID-19.
- Galina Kostenko, 82, Russian Olympic high jumper (1964).
- Samuel Luiz, 24, Spanish nursing assistant, beaten.
- Naushad Merali, 70, Kenyan communications executive and property developer.
- John Siffy Mirin, 42, Indonesian politician, MP (since 2018), COVID-19.
- Waldemar Mühlbächer, 83, German footballer (BFC Dynamo, East Germany national team).
- Patrick Murray, 76, English-born Australian Olympic sport shooter (1992, 1996).
- Ted Nash, 88, American rower, Olympic champion (1960).
- Maev O'Collins, 92, Australian social worker and academic.
- Sandra Payne, 69, American visual artist.
- Enzo Polidori, 84, Italian politician, mayor of Piombino (1976–1983).
- Roberto Rodríguez, 85, Argentine Roman Catholic prelate, bishop of La Rioja (2006–2013), Villa María (1998–2006) and Pertusa (1992–1998), COVID-19.
- Barbara Barnard Smith, 101, American ethnomusicologist.
- Anne Stallybrass, 82, English actress (The Six Wives of Henry VIII, Heartbeat, Diana: Her True Story).
- Rachmawati Sukarnoputri, 70, Indonesian politician, member of the Presidential Advisory Council (2007–2009), COVID-19.
- Athan Theoharis, 84, American historian, pneumonia.
- Haunani-Kay Trask, 71, American Hawaiian nationalist and author.

=== 4 ===
- Burhan Abdurahman, 64, Indonesian politician, mayor of Ternate (2010–2015, 2016–2021), COVID-19.
- Samuel Ankama, 63, Namibian politician, MP (since 2005), complications from COVID-19.
- Edgar Bear Runner, 70, American indigenous activist.
- Francesco Bosi, 76, Italian politician, senator (1996–2006) and mayor of Rio Marina (2001–2011).
- Raymond Brousseau, 83, Canadian film director, screenwriter, and artist.
- Bruce Burdick, 87-88, American exhibition designer.
- Sanford Clark, 85, American rockabilly singer ("The Fool", "Houston"), COVID-19.
- Terry Donahue, 77, American Hall of Fame college football coach (UCLA Bruins) and executive (San Francisco 49ers), cancer.
- Michel Dubois, 83, French theatre director.
- Roza Eldarova, 97, Russian writer and politician, chairwoman of the Presidium of the Supreme Soviet of the Dagestan ASSR (1962–1967).
- Maidarjavyn Ganzorig, 72, Mongolian cosmonaut, Soyuz 39 reserve pilot.
- Igor Garnier, 31, Serbian disc jockey and music producer.
- Luminița Gheorghiu, 71, Romanian actress (The Death of Mr. Lazarescu, Child's Pose, Code Unknown).
- Abebech Gobena, 83, Ethiopian humanitarian, COVID-19.
- Dennis Gorski, 76, American politician, member of the New York State Assembly (1975–1987), Erie County executive (1988–1999), complications from Parkinson's disease.
- Laurence Harding-Smith, 91, Australian Olympic fencer (1956).
- Harmoko, 82, Indonesian politician, minister of information (1983–1997), speaker of the DPR and MPR (1997–1999), progressive supranuclear palsy and COVID-19.
- Anne H. Hopkins, 79, American academic administrator, president of the University of North Florida.
- Matīss Kivlenieks, 24, Latvian ice hockey goaltender (Columbus Blue Jackets, national team), chest injuries from firework blast.
- Rick Laird, 80, Irish jazz fusion bassist (Mahavishnu Orchestra, Brian Auger and the Trinity), lung cancer.
- Richard Lewontin, 92, American evolutionary biologist.
- Barbara J. Litrell, 77, American magazine publisher (McCall's, Working Mother, Working Woman), complications from breast cancer.
- John McGrath, 81, Australian politician, Victoria MLA (1985–1999).
- Dicky Moegle, 86, American football player (San Francisco 49ers, Pittsburgh Steelers, Dallas Cowboys).
- Henry Parham, 99, American soldier, bladder cancer.
- Muhammad Taha Al-Qaddal, 69, Sudanese poet.
- Willie Quinnie, 41, American football player (Hamilton Tiger-Cats).
- Richard Rainey, 82, American politician, member of the California State Assembly (1992–1996) and Senate (1996–2000), melanoma.
- Hans-Jürgen Ripp, 75, German footballer (Hamburger SV, Lüneburger SK).
- Wolfgang Roth, 80, German politician, MP (1976–1993), vice president of the European Investment Bank (1993–2006).
- Adang Sudrajat, 58, Indonesian politician, MP (since 2014), COVID-19.
- Volodymyr Tyahlo, 74, Ukrainian politician, chairman of the Kharkiv Oblast Council (1992–1994, 1996–2002), ambassador to Armenia (2002–2005) and Kyrgyzstan (2005–2008).
- Dale Whiteside, 90, American politician, member of the Missouri House of Representatives (1987–1997).

=== 5 ===
- Fay Allen, 83, Jamaican-born British police officer.
- C. Dean Andersson, 75, American author.
- Masood Ashar, 91, Pakistani writer.
- Aggrey Awori, 82, Ugandan Olympic hurdler (1960, 1964), economist, and politician, MP (2001–2006), COVID-19.
- Patrick Boré, 64, French politician, mayor of La Ciotat (2001–2020), senator (since 2020), cancer.
- Raffaella Carrà, 78, Italian singer ("A far l'amore comincia tu"), actress (Caesar the Conqueror, Von Ryan's Express) and television presenter, lung cancer.
- Kuo-Chen Chou, 82, Chinese-American biophysicist.
- Didi Contractor, 91, American-Indian architect.
- Vivienne Cassie Cooper, 94, New Zealand planktologist and botanist.
- Roger Cudney, 85, American actor (On Wings of Eagles, Licence to Kill, Instructions Not Included), singer and dubbing director.
- Richard Donner, 91, American film director (Superman, Lethal Weapon, The Goonies) and producer, heart failure.
- Dom Flora, 85, American basketball player (Washington and Lee Generals, Akron Goodyear Wingfoots).
- Franco Gallina, 76, Italian football player (Virtus Entella, Cesena, Genoa) and manager.
- Roberto Hernández, 54, Cuban sprinter, Olympic silver medalist (1992), complications from cardiovascular disease.
- Rubén Israel, 65, Uruguayan football manager (Rentistas, Club Libertad, Barcelona de Ecuador).
- Heather Jansch, 72, British sculptor, stroke.
- Michelle Jerott, 60, American author.
- Leo van de Ketterij, 70, Dutch guitarist (Shocking Blue).
- Władysław Lisewski, 73, Polish politician and engineer, mayor of Szczecin (1991–1994), voivode of Szczecin (1997–1998) and West Pomerania (1999–2001).
- Vladimir Menshov, 81, Russian film director (Moscow Does Not Believe in Tears, Love and Pigeons) and actor (The General), COVID-19.
- Alfredo Obberti, 75, Argentine footballer (Newell's Old Boys, Grêmio, national team).
- José Secall, 72, Chilean actor (Feroz, Primera dama, Preciosas) and theater director.
- Danny Shanahan, 63, American cartoonist (The New Yorker), complications following surgery.
- Gillian Sheen, 92, British fencer, Olympic champion (1956).
- William Smith, 88, American actor (Fast Company, Rumble Fish, Any Which Way You Can).
- Stan Swamy, 84, Indian Roman Catholic Jesuit priest and tribal rights activist, complications from COVID-19 and Parkinson's disease.
- Sergey Timofeyev, 71, Russian Olympic wrestler (1976).

=== 6 ===
- Mohammad Izhar Alam, 72, Indian police officer, Punjab DGP.
- Quentin Bone, 89, English marine biologist.
- Arthur Brooks, 85, American politician, member of the Ohio House of Representatives (1975–1978).
- Tom Buford, 72, American politician, member of the Kentucky Senate (since 1991).
- Angelo Del Boca, 96, Italian historian.
- Mike Delanty, 84, Australian footballer (Collingwood, North Melbourne).
- Suzzanne Douglas, 64, American actress (The Parent 'Hood, How Stella Got Her Groove Back, When They See Us), cancer.
- Mary Fama, 82, New Zealand mathematician, complications from bronchiectasis.
- Djivan Gasparyan, 92, Armenian musician and composer.
- Valerius Geist, 83, Ukrainian-born Canadian biologist.
- Miguel González, 94, Spanish football player (Atlético Madrid, Real Zaragoza, national team) and coach.
- Sir Nicholas Goodison, 87, British businessman, chairman of the London Stock Exchange (1976–1986).
- Patrick John, 83, Dominican politician, premier (1974–1978) and prime minister (1978–1979).
- Axel Kahn, 76, French geneticist, president of Paris Descartes University, cancer.
- Harold Kalant, 97, Canadian pharmacologist and physician.
- Ramadhar Kashyap, 57, Indian politician, MP (2002–2008), heart attack.
- Marc Lamunière, 100, Swiss writer.
- Walter Libuda, 71, German artist.
- Colin McKee, 71, Australian politician, South Australia MHA (1989–1993).
- Barry McKenzie, 75, Australian footballer (Fitzroy, West Torrens).
- Montgomery Meigs, 76, American general, complications from Parkinson's disease and Lewy body dementia.
- Zenji Okuzawa, 83, Japanese Olympic runner (1964).
- Leandro de Oliveira, 39, Brazilian track and field athlete.
- Jean-Michel Ongagna, 75, Congolese footballer (Étoile du Congo, national team).
- William H. Pauley III, 68, American jurist, judge of the U.S. District Court for Southern New York (since 1998).
- Jasti Eswara Prasad, 86, Indian jurist, judge of the Andhra Pradesh (1990–1994) and Karnataka High Courts (1994–1996), heart attack.
- Nikolai Reznichenko, 69, Russian military officer, COVID-19.
- Dorothy Robins-Mowry, 99, American diplomat and writer.
- Des Schonegevel, 86, South African cricketer (Orange Free State, Griqualand West).
- Sheila Tobias, 86, American gender studies scholar.

=== 7 ===
- Christian Bom, 32, Cameroonian footballer.
- John T. Chain Jr., 86, American general.
- Greg Clark, 49, American football player (San Francisco 49ers), suicide by gunshot.
- Robert Downey Sr., 85, American film director (Putney Swope, Up the Academy) and actor (To Live and Die in L.A.), complications from Parkinson's disease.
- Keshav Dutt, 95, Indian field hockey player, Olympic champion (1948, 1952).
- Asela de Armas Pérez, 66, Cuban chess player, cancer.
- Jose Jaime Espina, 59, Filipino journalist, liver cancer.
- Anatoliy Franchuk, 85, Ukrainian politician, prime minister of Crimea (1994–1996, 1997–1998).
- Józef Gałeczka, 82, Polish footballer (Piast Gliwice, Zagłębie Sosnowiec).
- Erin Gilmer, 38, American disability activist and lawyer, suicide.
- Bob F. Griffin, 85, American politician, member (1971–1996) and speaker (1981–1996) of the Missouri House of Representatives.
- Orland Harris, 89, American politician.
- Karen Hastie Williams, 76, American lawyer, complications from frontotemporal dementia.
- Martin Hebner, 61, German politician, MP (since 2017), brain cancer.
- Allan Hobson, 88, American psychiatrist and dream researcher.
- Michael Horovitz, 86, German-born British poet.
- Smaïn Ibrir, 89, Algerian footballer (Le Havre AC, national team).
- Angélique Ionatos, 67, Greek singer and composer.
- Ahmed Jibril, 84, Palestinian militant, founder and leader of the PFLP-GC.
- Dilip Kumar, 98, Indian actor (Andaz, Daag, Qila), MP (2000–2006), prostate cancer.
- Kuo Jung-cheng, 71, Taiwanese politician, MLY (1999–2002), liver cancer.
- Pierre Laffitte, 96, French politician and scientist, founder of Sophia Antipolis and senator (1985–2008).
- Mihkel Leppik, 88, Estonian rowing coach.
- Law Hon Pak, 81, Hong Kong Olympic boxer.
- Cameron Mackenzie, 60, South African politician, MP (since 2014), COVID-19.
- Priscilla Johnson McMillan, 92, American historian and journalist.
- Jovenel Moïse, 53, Haitian politician and entrepreneur, president (since 2017), shot.
- Elystan Morgan, 88, Welsh politician, MP (1966–1974) and member of the House of Lords (1981–2020).
- Dinah Murray, 75, British writer and autism advocate, pancreatic cancer.
- Eddie Payne, 69, American college basketball coach (USC Upstate Spartans, Oregon State Beavers, East Carolina Pirates), stroke.
- Donald Pippin, 95, American pianist and opera director.
- Carlos Reutemann, 79, Argentine Formula One racing driver and politician, governor of Santa Fe Province (1991–1995, 1999–2003) and senator (since 2003), digestive hemorrhage.
- Sherwin Siy, 40, American attorney.
- Michael Soles, 54, Canadian football player (Edmonton Eskimos, Montreal Alouettes), complications from amyotrophic lateral sclerosis.
- William Stevenson, 87, Canadian justice, judge of the Supreme Court of Canada (1990–1992).
- Giovanni Tegano, 81, Italian mobster, head of De Stefano 'ndrina.
- Giuseppe Tesauro, 78, Italian jurist, president of the Constitutional Court (2014) and advocate general of the European Court of Justice (1988–1998).
- Chick Vennera, 74, American actor (Thank God It's Friday, Animaniacs, The Milagro Beanfield War), cancer.
- Ted Wieand, 88, American baseball player (Cincinnati Reds).
- Herman Willemse, 87, Dutch long-distance swimmer.
- Paul C. Weiler, 82, Canadian legal scholar.
- Chris Youngblood, 55, American professional wrestler (WWC, FMW, AJPW).

=== 8 ===
- Hossam Mohammed Amin, 71, Iraqi general, COVID-19.
- Paul Birckel, 82, Canadian businessman and indigenous leader, chief of the Champagne and Aishihik First Nations (1978–1998).
- Ramesh Borde, 69, Indian cricketer (West Zone).
- Jan Caliński, 72, Polish football manager (Śląsk Wrocław).
- Came Home, 22, American racehorse.
- Jack Cookson, 92, Canadian politician, Alberta MLA (1971–1982) and minister of the environment (1979–1982).
- Ricardo Costa, 81, Portuguese filmmaker and producer.
- Giorgos Dalakouras, 83, Greek politician, MP (1974–1981), MEP (1981), and civil administrator of Mount Athos (2004–2010).
- Max Griggs, 82, English footwear and football executive, owner of Dr. Martens and Rushden & Diamonds F.C.
- M. Frederick Hawthorne, 92, American inorganic chemist.
- Janet Kennedy, 87, British print designer.
- Walter T. McGovern, 99, American jurist, judge (since 1971) and chief judge (1975–1987) of the U.S. District Court for Western Washington.
- Adrian Metcalfe, 79, British sprinter, Olympic silver medalist (1964).
- Brian Osborne, 81, English actor (Upstairs, Downstairs, The Sandbaggers).
- Kirill Putyrsky, 92, Russian Olympic rower.
- Abul Kalam Qasmi, 70, Indian Urdu critic.
- Sam Reed, 85, American jazz saxophonist.
- Rachhpal Singh, 78, Indian politician, West Bengal MLA (since 2011).
- Virbhadra Singh, 87, Indian politician, four-time chief minister of Himachal Pradesh and MP (1962–1977, 1980–1984, 2009–2014), complications from COVID-19.
- Bryan Watson, 78, Canadian ice hockey player (Detroit Red Wings, Pittsburgh Penguins, Washington Capitals).

=== 9 ===
- Boris Andreyev, 80, Russian cosmonaut.
- Graham Bird, 90, British philosopher.
- Matthew Cao Xiangde, 93, Chinese Roman Catholic priest, unmandated archbishop of Hangzhou (since 2000).
- Jonathan Coleman, 65, English-born Australian radio and television presenter, prostate cancer.
- Frank Cook, 79, American drummer (Canned Heat, Pacific Gas & Electric) and psychologist.
- Þórunn Egilsdóttir, 56, Icelandic politician, MP (since 2013), breast cancer.
- Dawn Foster, 34, British journalist (The Independent, Tribune, The Guardian) and broadcaster.
- Betty Gilderdale, 97, British-born New Zealand children's author.
- Mirza Abdul Halim, 93, Bangladeshi politician, MP (1979–1986).
- Paul Huntley, 88, British wigmaker and hair designer
- Pentti Isotalo, 94, Finnish Olympic ice hockey player (1952) and referee (1964).
- George Johnson, 103, American Air Force major general.
- Wesley Momo Johnson, 77, Liberian politician, diplomat, and athlete.
- Vladimir Karasev, 83, Russian chess player.
- Gian Franco Kasper, 77, Swiss sports executive, president of the International Ski Federation (1998–2021).
- Peter Kopelman, 70, British academic administrator, interim vice-chancellor of the University of London (2018–2019), leukemia.
- Ngaire Lane, 95, New Zealand Olympic swimmer (1948).
- Joan Le Mesurier, 90, English actress and author.
- Frank Lui, 85, Niuean politician, premier (1993–1999), member of the Assembly (1963–1966, 1969–1999).
- Geoff Makhubo, 53, South African politician, mayor of Johannesburg (since 2019), complications from COVID-19.
- Paul Mariner, 68, English football player (Plymouth Argyle, Ipswich Town, national team) and manager, brain cancer.
- George Rhoads, 95, American sculptor and painter (Archimedean Excogitation).
- Emma Ritch, 44, Scottish equality activist.
- Mirro Roder, 77, Czech-born American football player (Chicago Bears, Tampa Bay Buccaneers).
- Jehan Sadat, 87, Egyptian human rights activist, first lady (1970–1981), cancer.
- Ken Thomas, British record producer. (death announced on this date)

=== 10 ===
- Esther Béjarano, 96, German singer (Women's Orchestra of Auschwitz) and Holocaust survivor, co-founder of the International Auschwitz Committee.
- Byron Berline, 77, American fiddler, complications from a stroke.
- Carmel Budiardjo, 96, British human rights activist, founder of Tapol.
- David Carter, 67, American football player (Houston Oilers, New Orleans Saints).
- Homen D' Wai, 51, Indian film director and scriptwriter (Yaiskulgee Pakhang Angaoba, VDF Thasana, Ei Actor Natte), COVID-19.
- Jean-Michel Dubernard, 80, French surgeon and politician, deputy (1986–2007), heart attack.
- Gwendolyn Faison, 96, American politician, mayor of Camden, New Jersey (2000–2010).
- Travis Fulton, 44, American mixed martial artist, suicide by hanging.
- Jimmy Gabriel, 80, Scottish football player (Everton, Southampton, national team) and manager.
- Galileo, 23, Irish racehorse and sire.
- Anne Paradise Hansford, 96, American basketball player.
- Ron Hutchinson, 84, Canadian ice hockey player (New York Rangers).
- Sonny Jackson, 82, American college football coach (Nicholls Colonels, McNeese State Cowboys).
- Tadeusz Lewandowski, 77, Polish politician and trade union activist, deputy (1991–1993) and senator (1997–2001, 2005–2007).
- Kathi Mahesh, 43, Indian film critic and actor (Hrudaya Kaleyam, Nene Raju Nene Mantri, Kobbari Matta), respiratory failure.
- Jean-Claude Malbet, 83, French rugby union player (Agen, national team).
- Jeff Manookian, 67, American pianist and composer, complications from lymphoma.
- Mandy Martin, 68, Australian artist, cancer.
- Syd Nelson, 88, American politician, member of the Minnesota House of Representatives (1991–1994).
- Natale Nobili, 85, Italian football player (S.P.A.L., Pro Vercelli, Alessandria) and coach.
- Dave O'Neal, 84, American politician, lieutenant governor of Illinois (1977–1981).
- Trevor Perrett, 80, Australian politician.
- Joachim Sauter, 62, German media artist and designer.
- John Spencer, 84, American college football coach.
- Dick Tidrow, 74, American baseball player (New York Yankees, Chicago Cubs, Cleveland Indians), World Series champion (1977, 1978).
- P. K. Warrier, 100, Indian Ayurveda practitioner.

=== 11 ===
- Philippe Aigrain, 71, French computer scientist.
- Eka Supria Atmaja, 48, Indonesian politician, vice-regent (2017–2019) and regent (since 2019) of Bekasi, COVID-19.
- Barnabas Bala, 64, Nigerian politician, deputy governor of Kaduna State (2015–2019).
- Juini Booth, 73, American jazz double-bassist.
- Filippo Cavazzuti, 79, Italian economist and politician, senator (1983–1996).
- George Ciamba, 55, Romanian diplomat.
- Michael Cullimore, 84, British watercolour artist.
- Jordi Cussà, 60, Spanish writer and stage actor.
- Dave Dunmore, 87, English footballer (Leyton Orient, York City, Tottenham Hotspur).
- Tomio Fujii, 96, Japanese politician, member of the Tokyo Metropolitan Assembly (1963–2005).
- Charlie Gallagher, 80, Scottish-Irish footballer (Celtic, Dumbarton, Ireland national team).
- Van A. Harvey, 95, Chinese-born American theologian and religious academic.
- Jerzy Janeczek, 77, Polish actor (Sami swoi, The Hourglass Sanatorium, Nie ma mocnych).
- Henryk Kowalski, 87, Polish racing cyclist.
- Jeci Lapus, 68, Filipino engineer and politician, member of the House of Representatives (2007–2013), heart attack.
- Ernie Moss, 71, English footballer (Chesterfield, Mansfield Town, Lincoln City).
- Anastasios Nerantzis, 76, Greek attorney and politician, member (1974–2014) and speaker (2007–2009) of the Hellenic Parliament.
- Colette O'Neil, 85, Scottish actress (Coronation Street, Doctor Who, The Spoils of War).
- Frank D. Padgett, 98, American jurist, associate justice of the Supreme Court of Hawaii (1982–1992).
- Laurent Monsengwo Pasinya, 81, Congolese Roman Catholic cardinal, archbishop of Kisangani (1988–2007) and Kinshasa (2007–2018).
- George Petersen, 87, New Zealand biochemist.
- Attilio Prior, 86, Italian footballer (Vicenza).
- Rade Radovanović, 92, Yugoslav Olympic triple jumper.
- Charlie Robinson, 75, American actor (Night Court, Sugar Hill, The Black Gestapo), complications from cancer.
- Boris Rotman, 96, Chilean-American immunologist and molecular biologist.
- Reynold Ruffins, 90, American painter.
- Renée Simonot, 109, French actress.
- Doug J. St. Onge, 87, American politician, member of the Minnesota House of Representatives (1973–1979, 1983–1985).
- Jerry Steele, 82, American basketball coach (Guilford Quakers, Carolina Cougars, High Point Panthers).
- Sound Sultan, 44, Nigerian rapper, angioimmunoblastic T-cell lymphoma.
- Betty L. Thompson, 81, American politician.
- John T. Traynor, 94, American politician, member of the North Dakota Senate (1991–2006).
- Oleg Tselkov, 86, Russian nonconformist artist.
- Joop Voorn, 88, Dutch composer.
- Jack Windsor Lewis, 94, British phonetician.

=== 12 ===
- Rusty Addleman, 82, American college football player.
- Luisa Adorno, 99, Italian writer and teacher.
- Mohammed bin Ismail Al Amrani, 99, Yemeni judge and Islamic scholar.
- Mick Bates, 73, English footballer (Leeds United, Walsall, Bradford City).
- Włodzimierz Borodziej, 64, Polish historian.
- Mien Brodjo, 84, Indonesian actress, painter, and athlete.
- Francisco Caló, 74, Portuguese footballer (Sporting, Tomar, national team).
- Tom F. Driver, 96, American theologian.
- Edwin Edwards, 93, American politician, member of the U.S. House of Representatives (1965–1972) and three-time governor of Louisiana, respiratory failure.
- Bertram Firestone, 89, American industrial real estate developer, thoroughbred breeder and horse owner (Genuine Risk).
- John Fiske, 81, English media scholar and cultural theorist, complications from heart surgery.
- Alex Gibbs, 80, American football coach (Denver Broncos, Atlanta Falcons), complications from a stroke.
- Erich Hasenkopf, 86, Austrian footballer (Wiener Sport-Club, national team).
- Wilson Jones, 87, Spanish footballer (Real Madrid, Real Zaragoza, Racing de Santander).
- Paulo Tarso Flecha de Lima, 88, Brazilian diplomat.
- Banduk Marika, 66, Australian indigenous artist and printmaker.
- Seán McCarthy, 84, Irish politician, TD (1981–1989), minister of industry and commerce (1987–1989).
- Nokuzola Mlengana, 58, South African actress.
- Bob Nakata, 80, American politician, member of the Hawaii House of Representatives (1983–1987) and Senate (1999–2003).
- Ben Ngubane, 79, South African politician, premier of KwaZulu-Natal (1997–1999), minister of arts and culture (1994–1996, 1999–2004), COVID-19.
- Paul Orndorff, 71, American Hall of Fame professional wrestler (WWF, WCW, GCW), dementia.
- Baselios Marthoma Paulose II, 74, Indian primate of the Malankara Orthodox Syrian Church, Catholicos of the East (since 2010), complications from COVID-19.
- Joshua Perper, 88, Romanian-born American pathologist and toxicologist, chief medical examiner of Broward County, Florida (1994–2011).
- Ladislav Potměšil, 75, Czech actor (Forbidden Dreams, Dobří holubi se vracejí, Byl jednou jeden polda), cancer.
- Jean Pradel, 87, French jurist and professor.
- Joseph Raffael, 88, American painter.
- John L. Rotz, 86, American Hall of Fame jockey.
- Matti Saarinen, 74, Finnish politician, MP (1987–1991, 1995–2015), pancreatic cancer.
- Marion Sarraut, 82, French film and television director (Catherine, Julie Lescaut).
- Mahmoud Shakibi, 94, Iranian footballer (Shahin, national team), heart attack.
- Wolfgang Weingart, 80, German graphic designer and typographer.
- Xu Jingren, 76, Chinese pharmaceutical executive and politician, chairman of YRPG and delegate to the National People's Congress (since 2018).

=== 13 ===
- Naveed Alam, 47, Pakistani Olympic field hockey player (1996), blood cancer.
- Antonio Barrutia, 88, Spanish racing cyclist.
- Brother Resistance, 66, Trinidadian rhythm poet and musician.
- Cha Gi-suk, 34, South Korean footballer (Gyeongju Citizen, Bucheon FC 1995), kidney failure.
- Susan Chitty, 91, English novelist.
- Alberto Dualib, 101, Brazilian businessman and football executive, chairman of Sport Club Corinthians Paulista (1993–2007).
- Abdul Dyer, 84, Pakistani cricketer (Karachi).
- Shirley Fry, 94, American Hall of Fame tennis player.
- Jorge J. E. Gracia, 78, Cuban-born American philosopher.
- Ronnie Kavanagh, 90, Irish rugby union player (Wanderers, Leinster, national team).
- Edison de Oliveira, 91, Brazilian politician, governor of Mato Grosso (1990–1991), vice-governor of Mato Grosso (1987–1990).
- Kumutha Rahman, 42, Malaysian politician, MP (2008–2013), COVID-19.
- Jean-Jacques Reboux, 62, French writer, poet and editor.
- Margaret Richardson, 78, American lawyer and public official, commissioner of internal revenue (1993–1997), complications from lung cancer.
- Bob Sargeant, 73, British musician and record producer.
- Yashpal Sharma, 66, Indian cricketer (Punjab, Haryana, national team), World Cup champion (1983), heart attack.
- Alexander Stefanovich, 76, Russian film director and screenwriter (Dusha, Start All Over Again), complications from COVID-19.

=== 14 ===
- Sam Belnavis, 81, American automobile racing executive (NASCAR).
- Christian Boltanski, 76, French sculptor, photographer and painter (Monument to the Lycée Chases).
- Klaus Bringmann, 85, German historian.
- Carol P. Christ, 75, American feminist historian and thealogian.
- Gary Corbett, 62, American keyboardist (Cinderella, Kiss) and songwriter ("She Bop"), lung cancer.
- Igor Dzyaloshinskii, 80, Russian theoretical physicist.
- Dan Forestal, 38, American politician, member of the Indiana House of Representatives (2012–2020).
- Sally Miller Gearhart, 90, American novelist (The Wanderground) and feminist.
- Yekutiel Gershoni, 78, Israeli historian and sprinter, Paralympic silver medallist (1980).
- Ariel Goldenberg, 70, Argentine-born French theatre director.
- Antonio Gómez del Moral, 81, Spanish racing cyclist.
- Mamnoon Hussain, 80, Pakistani politician, governor of Sindh (1999) and president (2013–2018), cancer.
- Patrick J. Kane, 93, American politician.
- Muhammad Muhsin Khan, 93, Pakistani Islamic scholar and translator (Noble Quran).
- Jeff LaBar, 58, American rock guitarist (Cinderella, Naked Beggars).
- Julian L. Lapides, 89, American politician, member of the Maryland House of Delegates (1963–1967) and Senate (1967–1994), cancer.
- Helen Lieros, 80, Zimbabwean visual artist.
- Janis Oldham, 65, American mathematician.
- Ava Preacher, 67, American academic.
- Ken Ronaldson, 75, Scottish footballer (Aberdeen, Bristol Rovers, Gillingham).
- Ricki Wertz, 86, American actress and television personality (Ricki & Copper).
- Kurt Westergaard, 86, Danish cartoonist (Jyllands-Posten Muhammad cartoons controversy).

=== 15 ===
- Robert Abirached, 90, Lebanese-born French writer and theatrologist.
- Keith Bambridge, 85, English footballer (Rotherham United, Darlington, Halifax Town).
- Mars Kadiombo Yamba Bilonda, 63, Congolese actor and screenwriter.
- Yves Boutet, 84, French footballer (Stade Rennais, Lorient).
- Rosario Casado, 60, Spanish pharmacist and politician, senator (2004–2008).
- Germán Castro Caycedo, 81, Colombian journalist (El Tiempo) and writer, pancreatic cancer.
- Floyd Cooper, 65, American children's writer (Unspeakable: The Tulsa Race Massacre), cancer.
- Libero De Rienzo, 44, Italian actor (Miele, La macchinazione, I Can Quit Whenever I Want), director and screenwriter, accidental drug overdose.
- Absattar Derbisali, 73, Kazakhstani Islamic cleric, supreme mufti (2000–2013).
- Ebrahim Desai, 58, South African mufti.
- Andy Fordham, 59, English darts player, world champion (2004), organ failure.
- Harry Gayfer, 95, Australian politician, Western Australia MLA (1962–1974) and Western Australian Legislative Council (1974–1989).
- Yves Goussebaire-Dupin, 90, French politician, mayor of Dax (1977–1995) and senator (1983–1992).
- Yoel Kahn, 91, Russian-born American Chabad rabbi.
- Judith Keating, 64, Canadian politician, senator (since 2020).
- Jean Kraft, 94, American mezzo-soprano.
- Jerry Lewis, 86, American politician, member of the California State Assembly (1969–1978) and U.S. House of Representatives (1979–2013), chair of the appropriations committee (2005–2007).
- Pyotr Mamonov, 70, Russian rock musician (Zvuki Mu), COVID-19.
- Kä Mana, 67, Congolese writer, professor, and theologian, COVID-19.
- Gerda Mayer, 94, Czech-born English poet.
- Dennis Murphy, 94, American sports entrepreneur, co-founder of the American Basketball Association and World Hockey Association, heart failure.
- Mike Mullally, 82, American college athletics administrator (Eastern Illinois Panthers, Cal State Fullerton Titans, Boise State Broncos).
- Mohamed Nafa, 82, Israeli politician, member of the Knesset (1990–1992).
- William F. Nolan, 93, American author (Logan's Run) and screenwriter (Trilogy of Terror, Burnt Offerings).
- Jaroslav Paška, 67, Slovak politician, three-time member of the National Council, MEP (2009–2014).
- James Polk, 83, American journalist (The Washington Star).
- Gloria Richardson, 99, American civil rights activist (Cambridge movement).
- Gira Sarabhai, 98, Indian architect, co-founder of NID.
- Sergio Silvagni, 83, Australian footballer (Carlton).
- David Snell, 87, English professional golfer.
- Hugo F. Sonnenschein, 80, American economist (Sonnenschein–Mantel–Debreu theorem).
- Sugiharto, 66, Indonesian politician, minister of state owned enterprises (2004–2007), COVID-19.
- Mikel Unzalu, 65, Spanish politician, general secretary of Euskadiko Ezkerra (1984–1991) and member of the Basque Parliament (2009–2016).
- Peter R. de Vries, 64, Dutch investigative journalist and crime reporter (Peter R. de Vries: Crime Reporter), complications from gunshot wounds.
- Bruce Watt, 82, New Zealand rugby union player (Canterbury, national team).
- Doris Willens, 96, American folk singer-songwriter (The Baby Sitters) and journalist.
- Peter Wynne-Thomas, 86, English cricket writer and historian.

=== 16 ===
- Anthony Adams, 80, Australian-American optometrist.
- Ibrahim Aliyu, 74, Nigerian general, military administrator of Jigawa State (1993–1996).
- Boudewijn Binkhorst, 78, Dutch Olympic sailor.
- Biz Markie, 57, American rapper ("Just a Friend") and actor (Men in Black II, Yo Gabba Gabba!), complications from diabetes.
- Doug Bennett, 75, American politician, member of the Michigan House of Representatives (2005–2010), traffic collision.
- Simon Dring, 76, British journalist (Reuters, The Daily Telegraph, BBC News) and television presenter, heart attack.
- Roger Fauroux, 94, French politician, mayor of Saint-Girons, Ariège (1989–1995).
- Desmond Fennell, 92, Irish writer, philosopher, and linguist.
- Finbarr Gantley, 70, Irish hurler (St. Gabriel's, Beagh, Galway).
- José María Gay de Liébana, 68, Spanish economist, lawyer and academic, cancer.
- Charles Gomis, 80, Ivorian diplomat, minister of foreign affairs (2000), ambassador to the United States (1986–1994) and France (2013–2020), vice president of the Senate (since 2020).
- Stephen Hickman, 72, American illustrator.
- Jean-Marie Lang, 78, French doctor and professor.
- Akira Miyawaki, 93, Japanese botanist, cerebral hemorrhage.
- Pablo Pérez Tremps, 64, Spanish jurist and academic, member of the Constitutional Court (2004–2013).
- Thomas Rajna, 92, Hungarian-born British pianist and composer (Seven Years in Tibet, Jet Storm).
- Jorge Romero Romero, 56, Mexican politician, deputy (2003–2006, 2009–2012).
- Harry M. Rosenfeld, 91, American newspaper editor (The Washington Post), complications from COVID-19.
- Hamid Reza Sadr, 65, Iranian football and film critic, cancer.
- Masatoshi Sakai, 85, Japanese record producer, heart failure.
- Danish Siddiqui, 38, Indian photojournalist (Reuters), Pulitzer Prize winner (2018), shot.
- Surekha Sikri, 76, Indian actress (Kissa Kursi Ka, Tamas, Mammo), cardiac arrest.
- Jim Stephenson, 86, Australian rules footballer (St Kilda).
- Sultana Zafar, 66, Pakistani actress (Ana, Tanhaiyaan).

=== 17 ===
- Pilar Bardem, 82, Spanish actress (Good Morning, Little Countess, Nobody Will Speak of Us When We're Dead, The Doubt), Goya Award winner (1996), lung disease.
- Jo Jo Barrett, 77, Irish Gaelic footballer (Austin Stacks, Kerry).
- John Carney, 51, American politician, member of the Kentucky House of Representatives (since 2009).
- Khurram Khan Chowdhury, 75, Bangladeshi politician, MP (1979–1986, 1988–1996, 2001–2008), COVID-19.
- Gerald Church, 93, Scottish footballer (Queen's Park).
- Dolores Claman, 94, Canadian composer ("The Hockey Theme"), complications from dementia.
- George Curtis, 82, English football player (Coventry City, Aston Villa) and manager.
- Louie Ehrensbeck, 76, American Olympic skier (1968).
- George Forss, 80, American photographer, heart failure.
- José Jaime Galeano, 75, Colombian Olympic cyclist (1968, 1976). (body discovered on this date)
- Mat George, 26, American podcast host, traffic collision.
- Claudine Hermann, 75, French physicist, cancer.
- Williams Martínez, 38, Uruguayan footballer (Defensor Sporting, Cerro, national team), suicide.
- Mohammed Milhim, 91, Palestinian politician, mayor of Halhul (1976–2004).
- Angéline Nadié, 53, Ivorian actress (Ma Famille).
- Valmiki Nayak, 69, Indian politician, Karnataka MLA (2009–2013), cardiac arrest.
- Youssoupha Ndiaye, 83, Senegalese jurist and politician, president of the Court of Cassation (1992–1993) and Constitutional Council (1993–2002), minister of sport (2002–2005).
- Marcel Queheille, 91, French road racing cyclist.
- Powerscourt, 21, British-bred Irish Thoroughbred racehorse, heart attack. (death announced on this date)
- Ellis Rainsberger, 88, American football player and coach (Kansas State Wildcats, Pittsburgh Maulers).
- David Randall, 70, British journalist and editor (The Observer, The Independent).
- Hermann von Richthofen, 87, German diplomat, ambassador to the United Kingdom (1989–1993).
- Jacqueline Sassard, 81, French-Italian actress (March's Child, Women Are Weak, Accident).
- Jim Shofner, 85, American football player (Cleveland Browns) and coach.
- Aleksandr Starovoitov, 80, Russian security officer and academic, director of FAPSI (1991–1998).
- Robby Steinhardt, 71, American singer and violinist (Kansas).
- Sir Graham Vick, 67, English opera director, COVID-19.
- Jonathan White, 82, New Zealand landscape painter.
- Patricia Wilde, 93, Canadian-born American ballerina.
- Milan Živadinović, 76, Serbian football player (Vardar, Rijeka, Crvenka) and manager.

=== 18 ===
- Afaz Uddin Ahmed, 95, Bangladeshi politician, MP (2008–2014), COVID-19.
- Jeff Barmby, 78, English footballer (York City, Goole Town, Scarborough).
- Mumtaz Bhutto, 87, Pakistani politician, governor (1971–1972) and chief minister of Sindh (1972–1973).
- Peter Downton Croft, 88, British Olympic field hockey player.
- Tommy Engstrand, 81, Swedish sports journalist and television host, COPD.
- Lawrence Seymour Goodman, 100, British bomber pilot (No. 617 Squadron RAF).
- Toby Goodman, 72, American politician, member of the Texas House of Representatives (1991–2007), heart attack.
- Bernie Hansen, 76, American politician, member of the Chicago City Council (1983–2002).
- Michel Husson, 72, French statistician and economist.
- Bruce Kirby, 92, Canadian Olympic sailor (1956, 1964, 1968) and yacht designer.
- Milan Lasica, 81, Slovak humorist, playwright, and actor, heart attack.
- Antonio José López Castillo, 76, Venezuelan Roman Catholic prelate, archbishop of Barquisimeto (2007–2020) and Calabozo (2001–2007) and bishop of Barinas (1992–2001).
- Jenny Lynn, 49, American bodybuilder, seizure.
- Arturo Armando Molina, 93, Salvadoran politician and military officer, president (1972–1977).
- Nurul Mustafa, 73, Bangladeshi computer scientist and academic administrator, vice-chancellor of Southern University (2016–2021).
- Tom O'Connor, 81, British comedian and game show host (Crosswits, The Zodiac Game, Name That Tune), complications from Parkinson's disease.
- Roger Quemener, 80, French racewalker.
- James Earl Reid, 78, American sculptor (Statue of Billie Holiday), heart failure.
- Carlos Seigelshifer, 92, Argentine Olympic weightlifter (1956).
- Donal Sheehan, 81, Irish hurler (Na Piarsaigh).
- Philip Sherry, 87, New Zealand newsreader and politician, deputy chairman of Auckland Regional Council.
- A. Y. B. I. Siddiqi, 76, Bangladeshi diplomat and police officer, IGP (1998–2000).
- Nenad Stekić, 70, Serbian Olympic long jumper (1976, 1980, 1984).
- Enn Tarto, 82, Estonian dissident and politician, MP (1992–2003).
- Paul D. Taylor, 82, American diplomat, ambassador to the Dominican Republic (1988–1992).
- Gérard Théry, 88, French engineer and computer scientist.
- John Woodcock, 94, English cricket writer.
- Valerij Zhuravliov, 82, Latvian chess player.

=== 19 ===
- Hans Booys, 69, Namibian politician, member of the National Assembly (1999–2010).
- Kurt Clemens, 95, German footballer (1. FC Saarbrücken, FC Nancy, Saarland national team).
- Danza, 10, American racehorse and sire. (death announced on this date)
- Juan Carlos Del Bello, 70, Argentine academic, director of INDEC (2002–2003) and rector of the National University of Río Negro (since 2008), heart attack.
- Layne Flack, 52, American poker player.
- Lynn Franklin, 74, American writer, metastatic breast cancer.
- Frank Gant, 90, American jazz drummer.
- José Siro González Bacallao, 90, Cuban Roman Catholic prelate, bishop of Pinar del Río (1984–2006).
- Derek Huggins, 80, English-born Zimbabwean artist.
- Kim Hong-bin, 56, South Korean mountain climber, fall.
- Murod Khanturaev, 34, Uzbek mixed martial artist, traffic collision.
- Butch Lee, 91, Canadian ice hockey player.
- Noel Lucey, 82, Irish Gaelic footballer (Glenbeigh-Glencar, Laune Rangers, Mid Kerry).
- David Lunn, 91, British bishop, Bishop of Sheffield (1980–1997).
- Paratene Matchitt, 88, New Zealand artist.
- Iván Noel, 52, Lebanese-born French-Argentine film director (En tu ausencia) and producer, suicide.
- Lito Osmeña, 82, Filipino politician, governor of Cebu (1988–1992), COVID-19.
- K. Sankaranarayana Pillai, 75, Indian politician, Kerala MLA (1982–1987) and minister of transport (1987–1991), heart attack.
- Abel Ramírez Águilar, 78, Mexican sculptor.
- Jacques Rougeot, 83, French literary critic and political activist, co-founder and president of the Union Nationale Inter-universitaire (1969–2009).
- Mohammed Sabila, 79, Moroccan writer and philosopher, COVID-19.
- Lloyd Sauder, 71, Canadian politician.
- Raymond Savard, 94, Canadian politician, MP (1977–1984) and mayor of Verdun, Quebec (1985–1993).
- Simon Terry, 47, British archer, Olympic bronze medalist (1992), cancer.
- Ron Vanderwal, 82, American-born Australian archaeologist, complications from Parkinson's disease.
- Tolis Voskopoulos, 80, Greek singer and actor (Marijuana Stop!, Agonia).
- Mary Ward, 106, Australian actress (Prisoner, Sons and Daughters, Neighbours).
- Chuck E. Weiss, 76, American songwriter and vocalist, inspiration for "Chuck E.'s in Love", cancer.
- Win Approval, 29, American Thoroughbred racehorse, euthanized.
- William S. Yellow Robe Jr., 59, American Assiniboine playwright, director, and lecturer.

=== 20 ===
- Vita Andersen, 78, Danish poet and author.
- Françoise Arnoul, 90, French actress (French Cancan, The Devil and the Ten Commandments, Forbidden Fruit).
- Sikkil R. Bhaskaran, 85, Indian violinist.
- James H. Bramble, 90, American mathematician.
- Dinos Constantinides, 92, Greek-American composer.
- Henri Deluy, 90, French poet.
- Daniel Escudero, 79, Chilean footballer (Everton, Unión La Calera, San Luis de Quillota).
- Ernst Fasan, 94, Austrian lawyer.
- Elvis Franks, 64, American football player (Cleveland Browns, Los Angeles Raiders, New York Jets).
- Inge Ginsberg, 99, Austrian-Swiss author and singer, heart failure.
- Jerry Granelli, 80, American-born Canadian jazz drummer (A Charlie Brown Christmas).
- Pierre Guitton, 77, French painter and comic book author (Charlie Mensuel, Hara-Kiri).
- Curt-Eric Holmquist, 73, Swedish conductor (Lotta på Liseberg), Eurovision Song Contest winner (1984), leukemia.
- Ron Howard, 67, American politician, member of the Kansas House of Representatives (since 2019).
- Theo Jubitana, 56, Surinamese administrator and politician, COVID-19.
- Dexter Kruger, 111, Australian supercentenarian and author.
- David Leckie, 70, Australian media executive (Seven West Media).
- Chuck McMann, 70, Canadian football player (Montreal Alouettes) and coach (BC Lions, McGill Redmen).
- Giorgos Messalas, 78, Greek actor (I Loved an Armchair).
- Anita Novinsky, 98, Polish-born Brazilian historian.
- Nyan Win, 78, Burmese politician, MP (since 1990), COVID-19.
- Brian O'Halloran, 83, Australian footballer (North Melbourne).
- Roger Owen, 67, Welsh rugby player (Llanelli RFC, St Helens R.F.C., national team).
- Alastair Paterson, 97, British engineer, president of the Institution of Structural Engineers (1984–1985) and of the Institution of Civil Engineers (1988–1989).
- Ruth Pearl, 85, Israeli-American software developer.
- André Petit, 99, French politician, deputy (1978–1981).
- Billy Reid, 83, Scottish footballer (Motherwell, Airdrie).
- Elmo Rodrigopulle, 80, Sri Lankan sports journalist.
- Noureddine Saâdi, 71, Algerian football manager (JS Kabylie, Al Ahli Tripoli, ASO Chlef), COVID-19.
- San Win, 73, Burmese historian and archaeologist.
- Louisette Texier, 108, Armenian-French resistant and racecar driver.
- Jacqueline Whitelaw, 64, American journalist.
- Bergen Williams, 62, American actress (General Hospital), complications from Wilson's disease.
- Peter Willis, 83, English football referee.

=== 21 ===
- Alexander McDonnell, 9th Earl of Antrim, 86, Northern Irish peer.
- Lieb Bester, 72, South African musician and actor (The Making of the Mahatma, Stander, Winnie Mandela), COVID-19.
- Claude Bonin-Pissarro, 100, French painter and graphic designer.
- Rita Brantalou, 73, French actor and musician (Au Bonheur des Dames).
- Jack Cable, 86, Canadian politician, Yukon MLA (1992–2000) and commissioner of Yukon (2000–2005).
- Paula Caplan, 74, American psychologist.
- Binoy Kumar Dewan, 96, Bangladeshi politician, MP (1986–1990).
- Awa Diop, 73, Senegalese politician, deputy (since 1990).
- Aleksander Eelmaa, 74, Estonian actor (Ruudi, A Friend of Mine, Õnne 13).
- Sekul Islam, 71–72, Bangladeshi engineer and academic administrator, vice-chancellor of Atish Dipankar University of Science and Technology (since 2017), cardiac arrest.
- Siân James, 90, Welsh novelist (A Small Country).
- Alberto Giraldo Jaramillo, 86, Colombian Roman Catholic prelate, archbishop of Medellín (1997–2010).
- Jean-Pierre Jaussaud, 84, French racing driver, heart attack.
- Chunni Lal Khetrapal, 83, Indian chemical physicist, vice-chancellor of the University of Allahabad (1998–2001).
- Tommy Leishman, 83, Scottish footballer (Liverpool, Stranraer, St Mirren).
- Janardan Manjhi, 78, Indian politician, Bihar MLA (since 2010).
- Clarence McDonald, 76, American pianist, composer and producer, cancer.
- Stan McKenzie, 76, American basketball player (Baltimore Bullets, Portland Trail Blazers).
- Noor Mukadam, 27, Jordanian-born Pakistani torture victim, decapitation.
- Uttam Nepali, 84, Nepali visual artist and writer, heart failure.
- Arif Nizami, 72, Pakistani journalist (Pakistan Today) and politician, caretaker minister of information & broadcasting (2013).
- Desmond O'Malley, 82, Irish politician, TD (1968–2002) and minister for industry and commerce (1977–1981, 1989–1992).
- Ronald Sharp, 91, Australian organ builder.
- Aleksandr Aleksandrovich Smirnov, 63, Russian politician, vice-governor of Saint Petersburg (2000–2003), deputy (2012–2016), COVID-19.
- Mike Smith, 83, English football player (Corinthian Casuals) and manager (Wales national team, Egypt national team).
- Juan Vital Sourrouille, 80, Argentine politician and economist, minister of economy (1985–1989), colorectal cancer.

=== 22 ===
- Bhageerathi Amma, 107, Indian centenarian student.
- Andrew Barker, 78, British classicist and academic.
- Vladimir Bogdashin, 69, Russian naval officer, COVID-19.
- Boris Chochiev, 63, South Ossetian politician, prime minister (2008), COVID-19.
- Ann Marie Flynn, 82, American Olympic high jumper (1956).
- C. Stuart Houston, 93, American-born Canadian physician and radiologist.
- John Hsane Hgyi, 67, Burmese Roman Catholic prelate, bishop of Pathein (since 2003), COVID-19.
- Greg Knapp, 58, American football coach (New York Jets, Atlanta Falcons), injuries from traffic collision.
- Jean-Yves Lafesse, 64, French humorist and actor, complications from amyotrophic lateral sclerosis.
- Michèle Lalonde, 83, Canadian writer and poet.
- Armando Larios Jiménez, 70, Colombian Roman Catholic prelate, bishop of Riohacha (2001–2004) and Magangué (1994–2001).
- Gary Leif, 64, American politician, member of the Oregon House of Representatives (since 2018), cancer.
- Dan Logue, 70, American politician, member of the California State Assembly (2008–2014).
- Gopal Mayekar, 87, Indian writer and politician, Goa MLA (1967–1972) and MP (1989–1991).
- Anna Mghwira, 62, Tanzanian politician, Kilimanjaro Regional Commissioner (2017–2021).
- Nityananda Misra, 92, Indian politician, MP (1980–1989).
- Valeriy Korotkov, 69, Ukrainian businessman. (death announced on this date)
- Howard Morgan, 91, American weather forecaster and artist.
- Christa Mulack, 77, German feminist theologian and author.
- Masamoto Nasu, 79, Japanese author, emphysema.
- Peter Neusel, 79, German rower, Olympic champion (1964).
- K. T. S. Padannayil, 88, Indian actor (Three Men Army, The Godman, Amar Akbar Anthony).
- Ian Palmer, 55, South African football player (Orlando Pirates) and manager (Chippa United), complications from COVID-19.
- Palo Pandolfo, 56, Argentine singer-songwriter and musician (Don Cornelio y la Zona).
- Rod Preece, 81, British-Canadian political philosopher and historian.
- Peter Rehberg, 53, Austrian-British electronic musician (KTL), heart attack.
- Şevket Sabancı, 85, Turkish industrial and financial entrepreneur (Sabancı Holding).
- Saw Mo Shay, 53, Burmese insurgent, commander-in-chief of the DKBA-5 (since 2016), COVID-19.
- Robert Shaw, 83, American politician, member of the Chicago City Council (1979–1983, 1987–1998), commissioner of the Cook County Board of Review (1998–2004), colon cancer.
- Guillermo Sucre, 88, Venezuelan poet, essayist, and literary critic.
- Tim Talton, 82, American baseball player (Kansas City Athletics).
- Andre Thysse, 52, South African boxer, COVID-19.
- Hikmat Singh Verma, 65, Fijian politician, MP (1999–2000), COVID-19.
- Zentaro Watanabe, 57, Japanese musician and music producer, pancreatic cancer.
- Christianto Wibisono, 75, Indonesian economist, COVID-19.

=== 23 ===
- Fakir Alamgir, 71, Bangladeshi folk singer, COVID-19.
- Alfred Biolek, 87, German entertainer and television producer (Bio's Bahnhof, Monty Python's Fliegender Zirkus).
- James C. Brincefield Jr., 80, American lawyer and actor (Homicide: Life on the Street, Serial Mom, Head of State), complications from Parkinson's disease.
- Ho-Kau Chan, 89, Hong Kong Cantonese opera singer and actress, cancer.
- John Cornell, 80, Australian film producer, writer (Crocodile Dundee) and actor (The Paul Hogan Show), complications from Parkinson's disease.
- Sam Domoni, 52, Fijian rugby player (London Irish, Saracens, national team) and coach.
- Jabbour Douaihy, 71, Lebanese novelist.
- Marilyn Evans-Jones, 92, American politician, member of the Florida House of Representatives (1976–1986).
- Wally Gonzalez, 71, Filipino blues guitarist (Juan de la Cruz Band).
- F. C. Gundlach, 95, German photographer.
- Michel Guyard, 85, French Roman Catholic prelate, bishop of Le Havre (2003–2011).
- Clyde Allen Hendrix, 86, American rockabilly singer and songwriter.
- Andy Higgins, 61, English footballer (Chester City, Port Vale, Rochdale).
- Jimmy Demianus Ijie, 53, Indonesian politician, MP (since 2019), COVID-19.
- Horst Kadner, 90, German Olympic sport shooter.
- Patricia Kennealy-Morrison, 75, American novelist (The Keltiad) and journalist (Jazz & Pop).
- Tito Lupini, 65, South African-born Italian rugby union player (Rovigo, Italy national team) and coach, COVID-19.
- David Lust, 53, American politician, member of the South Dakota House of Representatives (2007–2015, 2016–2019), heart attack.
- Toshihide Maskawa, 81, Japanese physicist (Cabibbo–Kobayashi–Maskawa matrix), Nobel Prize winner (2008), mandibular cancer.
- Piers Plowright, 83, British radio producer, cancer.
- David W. Preus, 99, American Lutheran minister, complications from heart failure.
- Claes Reimerthi, 66, Swedish comic book writer.
- Klaus Wilhelm Roggenkamp, 80, German mathematician.
- Claude Rouer, 91, French racing cyclist, Olympic bronze medalist (1952).
- Willem van 't Spijker, 94, Dutch minister and theologian.
- Maurice Taieb, 86, Tunisian-born French geologist and paleoanthropologist.
- Nicola Tranfaglia, 82, Italian historian and politician, deputy (2006–2008).
- Peter Trueman, 86, Canadian journalist (Global Television Network, CBC News).
- Miguel Ángel Virasoro, 81, Argentine physicist (Virasoro algebra).
- Steven Weinberg, 88, American theoretical physicist, Nobel Prize laureate (1979).
- Tuomo Ylipulli, 56, Finnish ski jumper, Olympic champion (1988).

=== 24 ===
- Rodney Alcala, 77, American serial killer.
- Alain Barrau, 74, French politician, deputy (1986–1993, 1997–2002), mayor of Béziers (1989–1995), cerebrovascular disease.
- Jahanara Begum, 79, Bangladeshi politician, MP (1991–1996), cardiac arrest.
- Dieter Brummer, 45, Australian actor (Home and Away, Neighbours, Underbelly: The Golden Mile), suicide.
- Arthur French, 89, American actor (Car Wash, Malcolm X, Movie 43).
- Penrose Hallowell, 92, American politician.
- Bernard de Kerraoul, 85, French writer.
- Satish Kalsekar, 78, Indian poet and essayist, heart attack.
- Herbert Köfer, 100, German actor (Reserved for the Death, Naked Among Wolves, Hands Up or I'll Shoot).
- Christian Larsen, 73, Danish Olympic boxer.
- Kenzie MacNeil, 68, Canadian songwriter, producer and director.
- Mac Makarchuk, 91, Canadian politician, Ontario MPP (1967–1971, 1975–1981).
- Rubén Martínez Puente, 79, Cuban military officer (Cuban Revolutionary Armed Forces) and politician, member of the National Assembly of People's Power (2008–2013).
- Jackie Mason, 93, American comedian and actor (The Simpsons, The Jerk, Caddyshack II), Emmy winner (1988, 1992).
- Kaarel Orviku, 86, Estonian marine geologist and photographer.
- Elly Pamatong, 78, Filipino lawyer and politician, cardiac arrest.
- Ed Patenaude, 71, Canadian ice hockey player (Edmonton Oilers, Indianapolis Racers).
- Virgílio Pereira, 80, Portuguese professor and politician, mayor of Funchal (1974–1983, 1994), deputy (1983–1986), and MEP (1986–1994).
- Sue Pinnington, 55, British Anglican priest.
- Yevgeni Pupkov, 45, Kazakhstani ice hockey player (Kazzinc-Torpedo, SKA Saint Petersburg, Khimik Voskresensk) and coach, COVID-19.
- Antoni Rajkiewicz, 99, Polish politician and economist, minister of labor, salary and social policy (1981–1982).
- Marco Antonio Raupp, 83, Brazilian mathematician and politician, minister of science, technology and innovation (2012–2014), acute respiratory failure.
- Romeu, 73, Spanish comics artist, co-founder of El Jueves.
- Pitaloosie Saila, 79, Canadian Inuk artist.
- Alfie Scopp, 101, English-born Canadian actor (Tales of the Wizard of Oz, Fiddler on the Roof, Rudolph the Red-Nosed Reindeer).
- Naha Mint Seyyidi, Mauritanian journalist.
- Dale Snodgrass, 72, American aviator, plane crash.
- Noel Swerdlow, 79, American science historian.
- Buddug Williams, 88, Welsh actress (Pobol y Cwm, Twin Town, Very Annie Mary).
- Johnny Young, 81, American diplomat, ambassador to Togo (1994–1997), Bahrain (1997–2001) and Slovenia (2001–2004), pancreatic cancer.
- Viktor Zheliandinov, 86, Ukrainian chess player and coach, International Master (1962).

=== 25 ===
- Rick Allen, 67, Scottish mountaineer, avalanche.
- John Arnold, 76, American politician, member of the Kentucky House of Representatives (1995–2013).
- Andy Carswell, 98, Canadian RCAF pilot.
- Otelo Saraiva de Carvalho, 84, Portuguese military officer, chief strategist of the Carnation Revolution and leader of Forças Populares 25 de Abril, heart failure.
- Philip Chatfield, 93, British-born New Zealand ballet dancer and choreographer.
- Phil Coleman, 90, American Olympic long-distance runner (1956, 1960).
- Alvin Duskin, 90, American clothing manufacturer and political activist.
- Doug Falconer, 69, Canadian football player (Ottawa Rough Riders, Calgary Stampeders) and film producer (Forsaken).
- Colin Forbes, 88, Australian rugby union player (national team).
- R. Ilankumaranar, 94, Indian Tamil scholar.
- Jean-François Istasse, 70, Belgian politician, Walloon deputy (1995–2014, 2018–2019).
- Abdul Kalim, 51, Fijian lawn bowler.
- Phil Lambert, 71, Australian television personality (Hey Hey It's Saturday).
- Bob Moses, 86, American civil rights activist (SNCC), co-founder of the Mississippi Freedom Democratic Party.
- Helen Nicol, 101, American baseball player (Kenosha Comets, Rockford Peaches).
- Eddy Posthuma de Boer, 90, Dutch photographer.
- R. Rajamahendran, 78, Sri Lankan media personality and businessman.
- Anni Rättyä, 87, Finnish Olympic javelin thrower (1952).
- Robert K. Ritner, 68, American Egyptologist.
- Rosine Vieyra Soglo, 87, Beninese politician, first lady (1991–1996), member of the Pan-African Parliament (2004–2009), MNA (1999–2019).
- Henri Vernes, 102, Belgian author (Bob Morane).
- Erika Vollmer, 96, German tennis player.
- Jing Wang, 71, Taiwanese media scientist, founder of NGO2.0, heart attack.
- Robert G. Yerks, 92, American lieutenant general.

=== 26 ===
- Rick Aiello, 65, American actor (Twin Peaks: Fire Walk with Me, Do the Right Thing, The Sopranos), pancreatic cancer.
- Cliff Anderson, 76, American basketball player (Los Angeles Lakers, Philadelphia 76ers, Cleveland Cavaliers), respiratory failure.
- Albert Bandura, 95, Canadian-American psychologist, heart failure.
- Július Binder, 89, Slovak engineer and politician, deputy (1998–2002).
- Aaron L. Brody, 90, American food scientist, complications from Alzheimer's disease.
- Wiktor Bukato, 72, Polish translator and publisher.
- Eric Carter, 101, British RAF pilot.
- Alfred Chupin, 104, French politician, mayor of Brest (1947–1953), deputy (1951–1955).
- William Clutz, 88, American artist.
- George De Peana, 85, Guyanese Olympic long-distance runner (1960) and trade union leader.
- Brazo de Plata, 58, Mexican professional wrestler (CMLL, WWE), heart attack.
- Ally Dawson, 63, Scottish football player (Rangers, Blackburn Rovers, Airdrie) and manager.
- Mike Enzi, 77, American politician, senator (1997–2021), mayor of Gillette, Wyoming (1975–1983), injuries sustained in traffic collision.
- Louise Fishman, 82, American abstract artist.
- Nikos Fokas, 94, Greek poet and essayist.
- Kåre Gjønnes, 79, Norwegian politician, minister of agriculture (1997–2000) and Nordic cooperation (2000).
- Bernardo Guerra Serna, 90, Colombian politician, member (1982–1986) and president (1982–1983) of the Senate.
- Natty Hollmann, 82, Argentine philanthropist, COVID-19.
- Mike Howe, 55, American heavy metal singer (Metal Church, Heretic), suicide by hanging.
- Jayanthi, 76, Indian actress (Jenu Goodu, Miss Leelavathi, Edhir Neechal).
- René Juárez Cisneros, 65, Mexican economist and politician, governor of Guerrero (1999–2005), president of the PRI (2018), and deputy (since 2018), COVID-19.
- Joey Jordison, 46, American musician (Slipknot, Murderdolls, Sinsaenum).
- Fernando Karadima, 90, Chilean Roman Catholic priest and convicted child abuser (Karadima case), bronchopneumonia and kidney failure.
- Dewey Lambdin, 76, American author.
- Gilbert Levin, 97, American engineer, aortic dissection.
- Lee Man Tat, 91, Hong Kong food manufacturer, chairman of Lee Kum Kee (since 1972).
- Ulla Nævestad, 75, Norwegian politician, MP (1989–1993), mayor of Lier (1995–2011).
- Elad Peled, 93, Israeli military officer.
- Mário Ribeiro, 86, Portuguese Olympic sport shooter (1972).
- Dídac Pestaña Rodríguez, 63, Spanish politician, mayor of Gavà (1985–2005) and member of the Parliament of Catalonia (2010).
- Gogó Rojo, 78, Argentine vedette and actress (Cry Chicago, Hay que romper la rutina), cardiorespiratory arrest.
- Grethe Rostbøll, 80, Danish politician, minister for culture (1990–1993) and MP (1995, 1996–1998).
- David Sampson, 76, English rugby league footballer (Wakefield Trinity, Bramley, Castleford).
- Sir Colin Southgate, 83, English businessman, heart attack.
- Josef Steffes-Mies, 81, German Olympic rower (1964).
- Joe Taffoni, 76, American football player (Cleveland Browns, New York Giants), lymphoma.
- Ivan Toplak, 89, Serbian football player (Red Star Belgrade) and manager (Oakland Clippers, Yugoslavia national team).
- André Tubeuf, 90, French writer, philosopher, and music critic.
- David Von Ancken, 56, American film and television director (Seraphim Falls, Tut, The Vampire Diaries), stomach cancer.

=== 27 ===
- Sherif Fouad Aboulkheir, 74, Egyptian Olympic basketball player.
- Menchu Álvarez del Valle, 93, Spanish radio journalist.
- Sergio Asti, 95, Italian designer and architect.
- Meriem Belmihoub, 86, Algerian independence fighter and lawyer.
- Rawle Brancker, 83, Barbadian cricketer (national team).
- Jack Carlisle, 91, American college football coach (East Tennessee State Buccaneers).
- LeRoy Clarke, 82, Trinidadian artist and poet.
- Tommy Connolly, 74, Irish football player (Dundalk) and manager.
- Orlando Drummond, 101, Brazilian actor (Escolinha do Professor Raimundo), voice artist and comedian, multiple organ failure.
- Pete George, 92, American weightlifter, Olympic champion (1952).
- José Arthur Giannotti, 91, Brazilian philosopher.
- Saginaw Grant, 85, American Sac and Fox actor (The Lone Ranger, The Ridiculous 6).
- Tony Guillory, 78, American football player (Los Angeles Rams, Philadelphia Eagles).
- Mo Hayder, 59, British actress (Are You Being Served?) and author (Birdman, Pig Island), complications from motor neurone disease.
- Jack Hedley, 91, Australian footballer (North Melbourne, Camberwell).
- Mike Hendrick, 72, English cricketer (Nottinghamshire, Derbyshire, national team), cancer.
- Phillip King, 87, British sculptor.
- Einar Bruno Larsen, 81, Norwegian footballer (Vålerenga, national team) and Olympic ice hockey player (1964).
- Rudi Leavor, 95, German-born British community activist and Holocaust survivor.
- Ning Li, 78, American physicist.
- Ray McBride, 69, Irish actor (Into the West, Pete's Meteor, Angela's Ashes) and dancer.
- Stefan Michnik, 91, Polish military judge and officer in Polish People's Army.
- Nada Milošević-Đorđević, 86, Serbian literary historian and academic.
- Gianni Nazzaro, 72, Italian singer and actor (Ma che musica maestro, Scandalo in famiglia, Impotenti esistenziali), lung cancer.
- Orestes Ojeda, 65, Filipino actor (Zoom, Zoom, Superman!, Manila by Night, Rosa Mistica), pancreatic cancer.
- Jan Pęczek, 70, Polish actor (Barwy szczęścia), bone marrow cancer.
- Jerry Pickard, 80, Canadian politician, MP (1988–2006).
- Enrique Planchart, 84, Venezuelan mathematician and academic, rector of Simón Bolívar University (since 2009).
- C. S. Reuter, 93, American politician, member of the Florida Senate (1967–1971), complications from Parkinson's disease.
- Zalika Souley, 73, Nigerien actress (Le Retour d'un aventurier, Cabascabo).
- Jean-François Stévenin, 77, French actor (The Dogs of War, Cold Moon, Sushi Sushi).
- Ellen Havre Weis, 64, American historian, brain cancer.
- Wen Shizhen, 81, Chinese politician, governor of Liaoning (1994–1998).
- Hal Wootten, 98, Australian judge and academic, puisne judge of the Supreme Court of New South Wales (1973–1983).
- Gérard Zingg, 79, French painter and film director (At Night All Cats Are Crazy).

=== 28 ===
- Khorshed Alam, 86, Bangladeshi economist, governor of Bangladesh Bank (1992–1996).
- Bolat Atabaev, 69, Kazakhstani theater director.
- Oleg Baklanov, 89, Russian politician, minister of general machine building (1983–1988).
- Léonel Beaudoin, 96, Canadian politician, MP (1968–1979).
- Porfirio Armando Betancourt, 63, Honduran footballer (Strasbourg, Marathón, national team), COVID-19.
- Roberto Calasso, 80, Italian writer and publisher (Adelphi Edizioni).
- André Catimba, 74, Brazilian footballer (Ypiranga, Vitória, Grêmio).
- Wade Cook, 71, American author, cancer.
- István Csom, 81, Hungarian chess Grandmaster (1973) and International Arbiter.
- Volodymyr Dykyi, 59, Ukrainian football player (Karpaty Lviv, Nyva Ternopil) and manager (Volyn Lutsk).
- Satsuki Eda, 80, Japanese politician, MP (1977–2019) and minister of justice (2011), pneumonia.
- Glen Ford, 71, American journalist, cancer.
- Nancy Frankel, 92, American sculptor, homicide by suffocation.
- Giuseppe Giacomini, 80, Italian operatic tenor.
- Dusty Hill, 72, American Hall of Fame musician (ZZ Top) and songwriter ("Tush").
- Tamara Kamenszain, 74, Argentine poet, writer and cultural manager, cancer.
- Krzysztof Karpiński, 67, Polish footballer (Śląsk Wrocław).
- Shahram Kashani, 47, Iranian pop singer, COVID-19.
- Ted Lewin, 86, American author and illustrator.
- Dick Long, 97, Australian politician, Victoria MLC (1973–1992).
- Malcolm McCaw, 91, New Zealand cricketer (Wellington).
- Bent Melchior, 92, Danish religious leader, chief rabbi of Denmark (1969–1996), heart attack.
- Linn F. Mollenauer, 84, American physicist.
- Nandu Natekar, 88, Indian badminton player.
- Lewis Petrinovich, 91, American evolutionary psychologist.
- Gacha Plienwithi, 95, Thai actor, COVID-19.
- Barbara Połomska, 87, Polish actress (Shadow, Eroica, The Eighth Day of the Week).
- Ron Popeil, 86, American inventor and businessman (Ronco).
- Ruben Radica, 90, Croatian composer.
- J. W. Rinzler, 58, American film historian and author (Star Wars), pancreatic cancer.
- Syed Abdus Samad, 79, Bangladeshi academic.
- Clive Scott, 84, South African actor (My Way, Beat the Drum, Winnie Mandela).
- Tzvi Shissel, 75, Israeli actor, director and producer, multiple organ failure.
- Sergo Sutyagin, 84, Uzbekistani architect, COVID-19.
- Derek Tomkinson, 90, English footballer (Port Vale, Macclesfield Town, Crewe Alexandra).
- Johnny Ventura, 81, Dominican merengue and salsa musician, mayor of Santo Domingo (1998–2002) and deputy (1982–1986), heart attack.
- Ben Wagin, 91, German artist.
- Michael Zachries, 77, German sailor, Olympic bronze medallist (1976).

=== 29 ===
- Janet Banana, 83, Zimbabwean teacher, first lady (1980–1987), kidney failure.
- Nery Cano, 66, Guatemalan trumpet player, conductor, and composer, respiratory failure.
- Jaime Chamorro Cardenal, 86, Nicaraguan journalist (La Prensa) and guerrilla.
- Michel Egloff, 80, Swiss prehistorian and archeologist.
- Robert Dove, 82, American politician and academic, parliamentarian of the U.S. Senate (1981–1987, 1995–2001).
- Anima Guha, 89, Indian writer.
- Thomas Joseph, 67, Indian writer.
- Richard Lamm, 85, American politician, governor of Colorado (1975–1987), complications from pulmonary embolism.
- John Landon, 71, American politician, member of the Iowa House of Representatives (since 2013), cancer.
- Carl Levin, 87, American politician, senator (1979–2015).
- Jon Lindbergh, 88, American underwater diver.
- Min Yu Wai, 92, Burmese writer, COVID-19.
- Janice Mirikitani, 80, American poet and political activist.
- Renata Müller, 84, Spanish Olympic gymnast.
- Gary B. Nash, 88, American historian, colon cancer.
- Susan Reynolds, 92, British medieval historian.
- Kaare Sandegren, 92, Norwegian trade unionist.
- Armen Shekoyan, 68, Armenian writer and poet.
- Lin-J Shell, 39, American football player (Orlando Predators, Toronto Argonauts, BC Lions), stroke.
- Tomasi Takau, 52, Tongan-American rugby union player, complications from COVID-19.
- Raymond Ken'ichi Tanaka, 93, Japanese Roman Catholic prelate, bishop of Kyoto (1976–1997).
- Mauro Testa, 74, Italian Olympic sailor (1972).
- Baroness Tuputupu Vaea, 92, Tongan royal.
- Albert Vanhoye, 98, French Roman Catholic cardinal, rector of the Pontifical Biblical Institute (1984–1990).
- Brodie Westen, 89, American football coach (Western Illinois Leathernecks).
- Zizinho, 59, Brazilian footballer (Club América, Club Necaxa, Monterrey), COVID-19.

=== 30 ===
- Ali Ashraf, 73, Bangladeshi politician, MP (1973–1979, since 2008).
- Frank Ashworth, 94, Canadian ice hockey player (Chicago Blackhawks).
- Bernardini, 18, American Thoroughbred racehorse, Preakness Stakes winner, euthanized.
- Roger Boore, 82, Welsh writer and publisher.
- Michel Chalhoub, 89, Syrian-born French luxury retailer, founder of the Chalhoub Group.
- Hüseyin Avni Coş, 62, Turkish politician, governor of Sakarya Province (2014–2017), heart attack.
- Jack Couffer, 96, American cinematographer (Jonathan Livingston Seagull).
- Daniel Delgado, 73, Panamanian lawyer, military officer and politician, minister of government and justice (2007–2008).
- Ganpatrao Deshmukh, 93, Indian politician, Maharashtra MLA (1962–1972, 1978–1995, 1999–2019).
- Elaine Duillo, 93, American painter and illustrator.
- Guy Eby, 102, American airline captain.
- Shona Ferguson, 47, South African actor (Generations, Isidingo, Muvhango) and producer, COVID-19.
- Henock ya Kasita, 68, Namibian politician, MP (1993–2010).
- Veno Kauaria, 60, Namibian politician, MP (since 2020), complications from COVID-19.
- John Lord, 84, Australian footballer (Melbourne).
- Ambilikile Mwasapile, 86, Tanzanian Lutheran priest and healer.
- Manuel Morato, 87, Filipino government official, chairman of the MTRCB (1986–1992), COVID-19.
- Rachel Oniga, 64, Nigerian actress (Sango, Doctor Bello, 30 Days in Atlanta).
- Jay Pickett, 60, American actor (Rush Week, Rumpelstiltskin, Port Charles), heart attack.
- Lasha Pipia, 45, Russian judoka.
- Richard Reicheg, 84, American actor and songwriter.
- Abdul Khaliq Sambhali, 71, Indian Islamic scholar.
- Martha Sánchez Néstor, 47, Mexican Indigenous human and women's rights activist, COVID-19.
- Curt Stone, 98, American Olympic long-distance runner (1948, 1952, 1956).
- Monique Thierry, 81, French actress (The New Adventures of Vidocq).
- Johan van Zyl, South African businessman, chairman of Toyota Motor Europe (2015–2021), COVID-19.
- Italo Vassallo, 80, Ethiopian footballer (Cotton Factory Club, national team).
- Thea White, 81, American voice actress (Courage the Cowardly Dog), complications from liver surgery.
- Hyacinth Wijeratne, 75, Sri Lankan actress (Kanyavi, Ho Gaana Pokuna), traffic collision.

=== 31 ===
- Intisar Al-Sharrah, 58, Kuwaiti actress.
- Herminio Aquino, 72, Filipino businessman and politician, member of the House of Representatives (1987–1998).
- Angela Bailey, 59, Canadian sprinter, Olympic silver medalist (1984), cancer.
- Josemith Bermúdez, 41, Venezuelan actress and TV personality, ovarian cancer.
- Paco Cabanes Pastor, 66, Spanish Valencian pilota player, cancer.
- Chin Sian Thang, 83, Burmese politician, MP (1990–2010), COVID-19.
- Charles Connor, 86, American drummer (Little Richard).
- Terry Cooper, 77, English football player (Leeds United, national team) and manager (Bristol City).
- Paul Cotton, 78, American musician (Poco, Illinois Speed Press) and songwriter ("Heart of the Night").
- Royce Flippin, 87, American college football player (Princeton Tigers).
- Alvin Ing, 89, American singer and actor (The Final Countdown, Stir Crazy, The Gambler), COVID-19.
- Kenneth Johansson, 65, Swedish politician, MP (1998–2012).
- Man Kaur, 105, Indian masters track and field athlete, heart attack.
- Jerzy Matuszkiewicz, 93, Polish jazz musician (Melomani), bandleader and film score composer.
- Jean-Claude Kazembe Musonda, 58, Congolese politician, governor of Haut-Katanga Province (2016–2017).
- Isaac Ngahane, 66, Cameroonian politician, deputy (2002–2021).
- Thomas Nicholls, 89, English featherweight boxer, Olympic silver medalist (1956).
- Martin Perscheid, 55, German cartoonist, cancer.
- Jalal Sattari, 89, Iranian mythologist, writer, and translator.
- Mark Tarlov, 69, American film producer (Christine, Copycat), director (Simply Irresistible) and winemaker, cancer.
- Aloys Wobben, 69, German wind turbine manufacturer, founder of Enercon.
- Ronald C. Wornick, 89, American food scientist.
- Jacobus Frederick van Wyk, 69, South African politician, member of the National Assembly (1997–2004), complications from COVID-19.
- Yeo Hyo-jin, 38, South Korean footballer (Gimcheon Sangmu, Tochigi SC, Goyang Zaicro), cancer.
