= Jan Caliński =

Polish football manager (1948–2021)

Personal information
- Date of birth: 21 November 1948
- Date of death: 5 July 2021 (aged 72)

Managerial career
- Years: Team
- 1980–1983: Śląsk Wrocław
- 1984–1986: Gornik Wałbrzych
- 1986–1987: Ślęza Wrocław
- 1989–1991: Victoria Ostrzeszów
- 1996: Śląsk Wrocław
- 1997: Śląsk Wrocław
- 1999–2000: Śląsk Wrocław

Jan Caliński (21 November 1948 – 5 July 2021) was a Polish football manager.

== Honours ==
Śląsk Wrocław

- II liga: 1999–2000
