= Attilio Prior =

Italian footballer (1934–2021)

Personal information
- Date of birth: 18 October 1934
- Place of birth: Castelfranco Veneto, Italy
- Date of death: 10 July 2021 (aged 86)
- Place of death: Castelfranco Veneto, Italy
- Position: Midfielder

Senior career*
| Years | Team | Apps | (Gls) |
| 1953–1955 | Lanerossi Vicenza | 5 | (0) |
| 1960 | Toronto Italia | | |
- * Club domestic league appearances and goals

Attilio Prior (18 October 1934 – 10 July 2021) was an Italian footballer who played as a midfielder.

== Career ==
Prior played in Serie B with Lanerossi Vicenza in 1953. He made his debut on 9 May 1954 against Calcio Como. The following season he appeared in five matches and assisted in securing the Serie B title.

In 1960, he played abroad in the National Soccer League with Toronto Italia. The signing of Prior was reflective of Italia's general manager Alan Astri's policy of foreign player recruitment.

In the postseason match against Toronto Sparta he recorded goal to advance Italia to the NSL Championship finals. The team secured the NSL Championship after a series of matches against Montreal Cantalia.

He died on 10 July 2021.

== Honors ==
Lanerossi Vicenza

- Serie B: 1954-1955

Toronto Italia

- NSL Championship: 1960
- National Soccer League: 1960
