= Eddy Posthuma de Boer =

Dutch photographer (1931–2021)

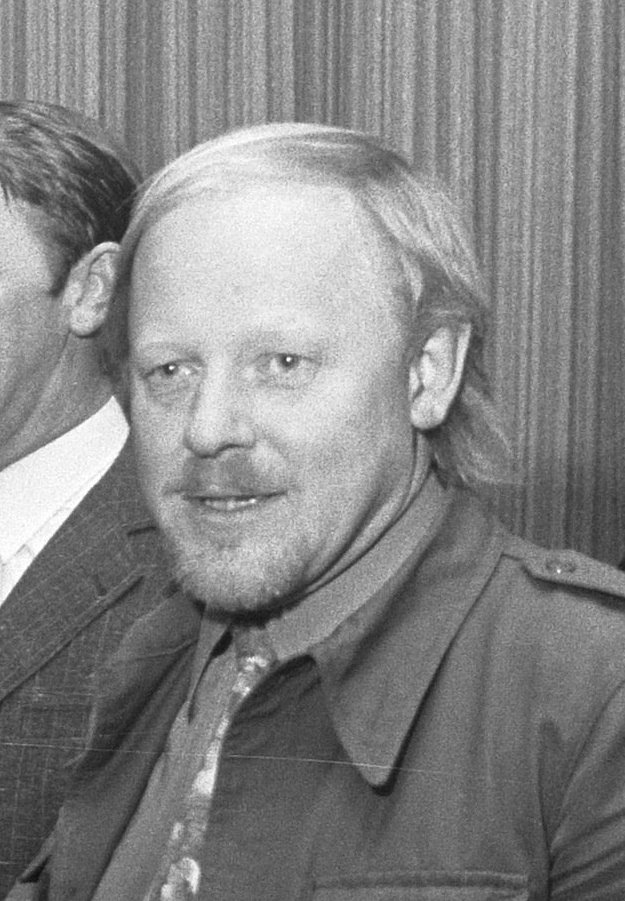
Posthuma de Boer in December 1972 at the ceremony of LOF Prize of which he was one of the recipients.

Eddy Posthuma de Boer (30 May 1931 – 25 July 2021) was a Dutch photographer and photojournalist. He worked for a number of Dutch media and as a freelancer. Posthuma de Boer made portraits of writers, musicians, and ordinary people.

== Early life ==
Posthuma de Boer was born in Amsterdam.

== Career ==
He started his career as an assistant with ANP and subsequently worked together with such media as De Volkskrant and Het Parool. As a photographer, he visited over 90 countries, and one time was a travel reporter for the magazine Avenue. He also documented the development of youth culture and paid particular attention to jazz and rock-’n-roll music. He was greatly influenced by Eva Besnyö.

Posthuma de Boer participated in photographic exhibitions, being mostly known for his portraits, of writers, musicians as well as of ordinary people. He was one of the most significant Dutch photographers of the post-WWII generation.

In 1997, Posthuma de Boer was the recipient of Kees Scherer award. In 2020, he had a large solo exhibition at Fotomuseum Den Haag.

== Personal life ==
Since 1961, Posthuma de Boer was married with the singer Henriëtte Klautz. They had two daughters, the photographer Tessa Posthuma de Boer and the writer Eva Posthuma de Boer. He is referenced on page 103, in the book Two Roads Home, by Daniel Finklestein, where he shockingly witnessed as a boy on 20 June 1943, the rounding up and arrest of Jews in the center of Amsterdam. He saw two of his schoolmates in the group. He reported these two ultimately perished.

== Publications ==
- Amsterdam. Adriaan Morriën and Posthuma de Boer. Leiden, Stafleu, 1959
- Carnaval. Bertus Aafjes and Posthuma de Boer. Utrecht: Bruna, 1968
- 222 Schrijvers. Literaire portretten. Eddy and Tessa Posthuma de Boer. Amsterdam: Bas Lubberhuizen, 2005. ISBN 9789059370906
- Het menselijk bestaan. De wereld van fotograaf Eddy Posthuma de Boer. Eindhoven: Lecturis, 2015. ISBN 978-94-6226113-6
- Door het oog van de tijd. De Reve-foto's van Eddy Posthuma de Boer. Varik: De Weideblik, 2015. ISBN 978-90-77767-54-2
- Muggen en olfianten. Eddy & Tessa Posthuma de Boer. Amsterdam: Ambo/Anthos, 2020. ISBN 9789026354021
- 90. Amsterdam: Arguspers, 2021.
