= R. Ilankumaranar =

Tamil scholar (1927–2021)

- Born: 30 January 1927; Vazhavandalpuram, Tirunelveli, Tamil Nadu, British Raj
- Died: 25 July 2021 (aged 94); Thirunagar, Madurai, Tamilnadu

Puluvar R. Ilankumaranar (30 January 1927 – 25 July 2021) was an Indian Tamil scholar. He worked as a school teacher and later as a novelist, publisher, magazine editor and speaker. He conducted nearly 5,000 marriages in an ancient Tamil tradition of conducting marriages naming it as 'Aadhi Tamil Murai Thirumanam'.

== Early life ==
Ilankumaranar was born in Vazhavandalpuram, a village in Tirunelveli district as the eighth and last child of his parents on 30 January 1927. He started his Tamil career as a 19 year old in 1946 as a Tamil teacher in a government school in Thirunagar. He got first class in 1951 Pulava examination at the University of Chennai.

== Career ==
In 1963, former Prime Minister Nehru published a book, Thiruku Essay Collection, written by Ilankumaranar. Abdul Kalam, the former president, published the book ‘Hundred in the Sangam Literary Series’ in 2003. He is the author of more than 600 books. His greatest work was to retrieve the ‘Kakkaipadiniyam’, a grammar work done by a Tamil poet named Kakkaipadini in the 6th century AD. He established the Thiruvalluvar Thava Salai in 1993.

== Responsibilities of organizations ==
He has held many responsibilities including the Secretary of the Tamil Archives, the Secretary of the Madurai District Tamil Editors' Association and the organizer of the selection committee. He also worked as a guest professor at the Kamarasar University, Madurai.

== Awards and honours ==
He received Tiruvika Award from Government of Tamil Nadu, Lifetime Achievement Award from Federation of Tamil Sangams of North America in 2007, ‘Tamil Peravai Semmal' by Madurai Kamaraj University in 2009, 2012 Pachamuthu Paynthamil Award-Lifetime Achievement Award, Master of Arts (D.Lit) from Bharathidasan University, ‘Mozhipor Maravar' by Tamil Santror Peravai, and titles like ‘Thirukural Paeroli', ‘Semmozhi Sitthar' and ‘Tamil Kadal'.

== Death ==
Ilankumaranar died on 25 July 2021 at the age of 94.
