= Martha Sánchez Néstor =

Mexican Indigenous activist (1974–2021)

Martha Sánchez Néstor (4 February 1974 – 30 July 2021) was a Mexican Indigenous human and women's rights activist. She died from complications of COVID-19.

== Awards and honors ==
In 2012, she received the Omecíhuatl medal "For outstanding contributions to the recognition and exercise of women's human rights".

== Work ==
Martha Sánchez Néstor was a leading figure for the Indigenous women's rights movement in Mexico. She was born and raised in Guerrero, Mexico of the Indigenous community Costa ChicaMontaña. She advocated at both a national and international level. Her activisim unfolded the structural inequalities faced by Indigenous women while at the same time, she called for them to recognized as central figures to their own liberation. Throughout her career, she underminded the patriarchal and colonial framework that oppressed Indigenous women. With a collaboration of the articles, it can be argued that Sánchez Néstor was a pioneering activist of Indigenous feminist activist whose impact is still being seen today with the shape of policy, scholarships, and grassroots community work in Mexico.

Martha Sánchez Néstor was determined in bringing the demands of Indigeouns women to national and international spaces. In the speech, "Voces Indias en la Onu", it demonstrates how she positioned Indigenous rights framework to be presented at an international level. This further proves the lack of representation for Indigenous communities at an international level. She was fighting to demonstrate how women can be legitimate political leaders to their own injustices. She assisted in making Indigenous women's struggles visible to the world.

A key theme to Sánchez Néstor work was to building platforms in where Indigenous women could be the narrators to their own experiences and political agendas. In the article, La Doble Mirada, she is coordinating with scholar Alma Gilda Lopez Mejia to elaborate on the power of storytelling. She argues it is a politically empowering tool for Indigenous women because they can share their struggles with their own voices. Furthermore, the text demonstrates how silencing of Indigenous women is both a weapon of colonial forces. This is why, as Sánchez Néstor argues, it is critical for Indigenous women to be recognized as producers of knowledge to fight colonial forces. By forming an environment in which Indigenous women could be the narrators to their own stories and be recognized as producers of their knowledge, it will shape a feminist praxis that is rooted in Indigenous women epistemologies.

A key theme throughout Sánchez Néstor's work was her focus on confronting the structural violence and systemic exclusion that Indigenous women faced in Mexico. In the article, "Making the Invisible Visible: The Position of Indigenous Women in Mexico: A General Overview of the Challenges Ahead", researcher Barbara Ortiz examines the challenges Indigenous women were facing. Some she found are limited political representation, economic marginalization, and gender-based violence. These challenges highlighted in the article are parallel to those that Sánchez Néstor advocated. This is why it is important for these issues to be a public issue.

== Legacy ==
Even years following her death, Sánchez Néstor continues to be honored for her work. In the news article that is published in 2025, one can see the impact of her death. It discusses the award that is given in her memory. This award demonstrates her legacy and how it shaped the understanding of Indigenous women's rights in Mexico. This award given by the federal government reflects the years she has committed to the battle for Indigenous rights. This recognition solidifies her legacy as a transformative figure whose work continues to be felt.
