= Sikkil R. Bhaskaran =

Indian violinist (1936–2021)

- Born: Sikkil Rajagopala Bhaskaran; 4 May 1936; Sikkil, Thanjavur district, Tamil Nadu
- Died: 20 July 2021 (aged 85)

Sikkil R. Bhaskaran (4 May 1936 – 20 July 2021) was a violinist in Carnatic music and Tamil Isai.

== Sources ==
- Bhaskar, Radha. "A Versatile Violinist... Sikkil R. Bhaskaran." Samudhra. December 2009: 3–11. Print.
- "Bout of swaras." The Hindu. [Chennai] 2 January 2004: FR-8. Print.
- Giridhar, S.R. "Elaborate, attractive alapana." The Hindu. [Chennai] 25 December 1998: 35. Print.
- "Maharajapuram Viswanatha Iyer Memorial Award presented." The Hindu. [Chennai] 29 November 2010. Print.
- S.K. "Vintage stuff." The Hindu. [Chennai] 28 December 2001: FR-14. Print.
- Vishwanath, Narayana. "Debate on city's cultural events." City Express. [Chennai] 16 April 2012. Print.
- V, Sarada. "Thyagaraja comes alive via Trichur's tribute." The Hitavada. [Chennai] 31 August 1995: 14. Print.
