= Bernard de Kerraoul =

French writer (1936–2021)

- Born: Bernard Vittu de Kerraoul; 17 February 1936; Saint-Brieuc, France
- Died: 24 July 2021 (aged 85); Rennes, France

Bernard Vittu de Kerraoul (17 February 1936 – 24 July 2021) was a French writer, journalist, and columnist. He wrote numerous books, many of which were translated into English, Italian, and Spanish. His first book, Le poids des âmes, received the Prix International du Premier Roman in 1963. He was a member of the council of the bimonthly magazine Una voce.

== Biography ==
He attended the Lycée Saint-Charles in Saint-Brieuc from 1947 to 1953, and was a member of the board of directors of the Amicale des anciens élèves from 1988 to 2005.

A journalist, editorialist and writer, he is the author of numerous works, several of which have been translated into English, Italian and Spanish. His first book, Le poids des âmes, was awarded the Prix du Premier Roman in 1963. In 1969, he was awarded the Prix littéraire de l'Académie de Bretagne for Tissant sa toile. His works are widely distributed in French-speaking countries such as Canada, Belgium and Switzerland.

A journalist, columnist and editorialist, he is editor and member of the board of the bimonthly magazine Una voce alongside Denis Tillinac, and literary columnist for the magazine L'entente catholique de Bretagne.

== Publications ==
=== Novels ===
- Le Poids des âmes (1963)
- Une si juste mort (1963)
- Ombres sur Ardbury (1965)
- Une grande conscience (1967)
- La Carapace (1968)
- Tissant sa toile (1969)
- La Réconciliation (1971)
- Le Temps de l'imposture (1972)

=== Other books ===
- La Bretagne de la Rance au Trégor (1969)
