= Krzysztof Karpiński =

Polish footballer (1953–2021)

Personal information
- Date of birth: 16 October 1953
- Place of birth: Kalisz, Poland
- Date of death: 28 July 2021 (aged 67)
- Place of death: Wrocław, Poland
- Height: 1.67 m (5 ft 6 in)
- Position: Defender

Youth career
- –1974: Calisia Kalisz

Senior career*
Years	Team	Apps	(Gls)
1974–1975	Śląsk Wrocław II		
1975–1979	Śląsk Wrocław	81	(0)
- Odra Wrocław
- Pafawag Wrocław
- Odra Opole
- Polar Wrocław
- * Club domestic league appearances and goals

Krzysztof Karpiński (16 October 1953 – 28 July 2021) was a Polish professional footballer who played as a defender.

== Honours ==
Śląsk Wrocław

- Ekstraklasa: 1976–77
- Polish Cup: 1975–76
