= Graham Bird =

British philosopher

- Born: Graham Harrington Bird; 31 October 1930
- Died: 9 July 2021 (aged 90)

Philosophical work
- Era: Contemporary philosophy
- Region: Western philosophy
- Institutions: University of Manchester
- Main interests: German philosophy

Graham Harrington Bird (31 October 1930 – 9 July 2021) was a British philosopher who taught at the University of Manchester. He was known for his works on Kant's philosophy.

== Books ==
- Kant’s Theory of Knowledge: An Outline of One Central Argument in the Critique of Pure Reason. London, Routledge & Kegan Paul 1962; rpt. London: Routledge, 2017.
- Philosophical Tasks. London, Hutchinson's University Library; rpt.: New York: Routledge, 2021.
- William James. Arguments of the Philosophers; London, Routledge & Kegan Paul 1986; rpt.: London: Routledge, 2009.
- The Revolutionary Kant: A Commentary on the Critique of Pure Reason. Chicago, Open Court 2006.
