= Jean-Marie Lang =

French professor and doctor (1943–2021)

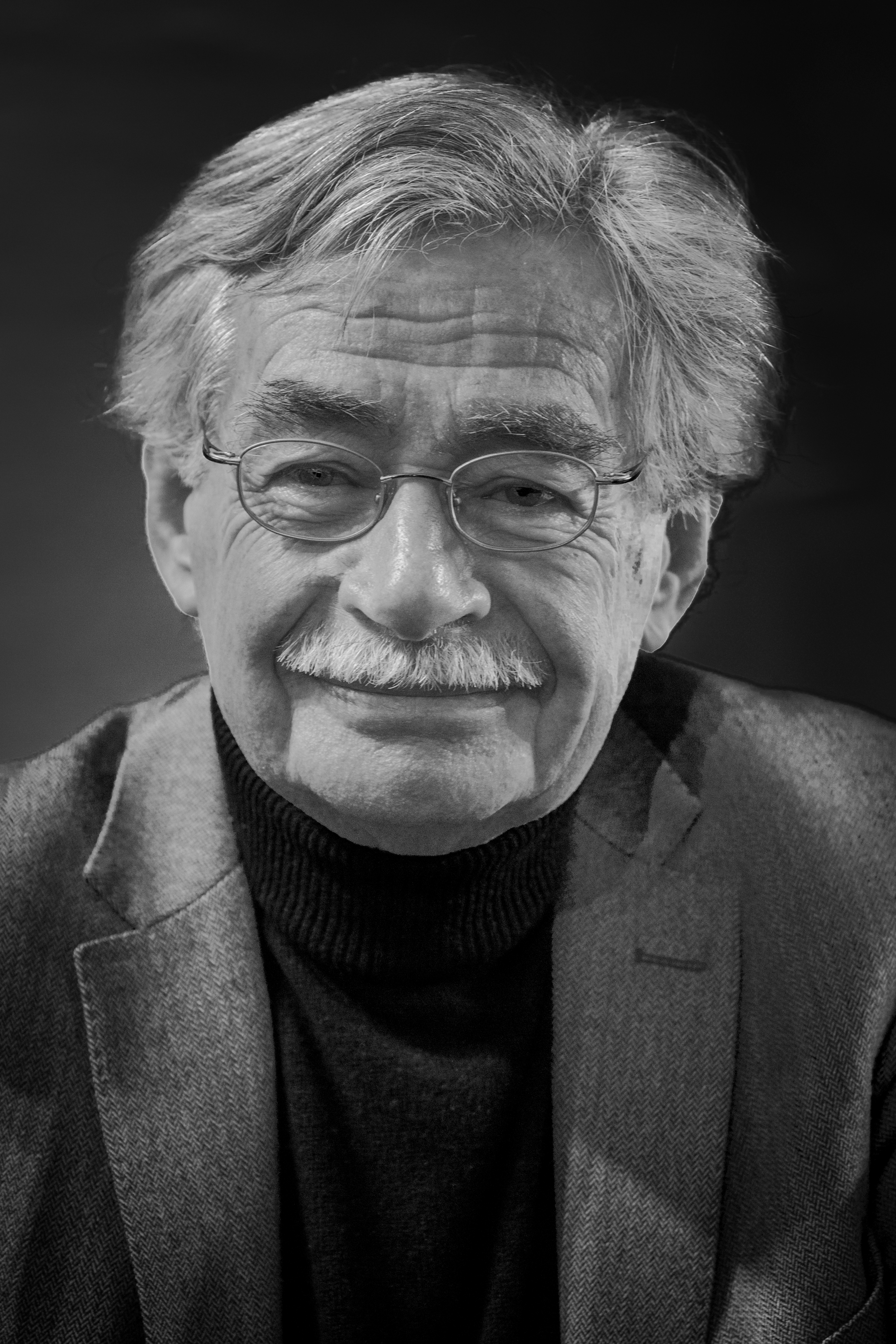
- Lang in 2015
- Born: 13 May 1943; Offemont, France
- Died: 16 July 2021 (aged 78); Oberhausbergen, France
- Occupations: Professor; Doctor

Jean-Marie Lang (13 May 1943 – 16 July 2021) was a French doctor and professor of immuno-oncology. He practiced medicine at the Nouvel Hôpital civil in Strasbourg and he was a professor at the University of Strasbourg.

== Biography ==
Lang studied under Robert Waitz at Louis Pasteur University. He wrote his thesis on "mixed cultures of lymphocytes: search for a specific inhibition of the immunological response to the antigenic specificities of the donor in kidney transplant patients" in 1971. In 1983, he became a specialist in the fight against HIV and was regional coordinator for the fight against the disease with Hôpitaux universitaires de Strasbourg from 1987 to 2011. Alongside Professor Willy Rozenbaum, head of the Hôpital Saint-Louis and Sophie Delaunay, head of the Ensemble pour une Solidarité Thérapeutique Hospitalière En Réseau, he signed a cooperation agreement with the Laotian Minister of Health, Pomnek Dalaloy, and the French Ambassador to Laos. He retired in 2011.

Jean-Marie Lang died in Oberhausbergen on 16 July 2021 at the age of 78.
