= Igor Garnier =

Serbian DJ (1990–2021)

- Born: February 16, 1990
- Died: July 4, 2021 (aged 31)
- Genres: Electronic music, house music, dance music
- Occupation(s): Record producer, DJ
- Instrument(s): keyboard, laptop
- Years active: 2007–2021
- Website: www.igorgarnier.com

Igor Garnier (16 February 1990 – 4 July 2021) was a Serbian DJ, composer, songwriter and music producer.

== Life and career ==
Garnier was born in Belgrade, Yugoslavia. His first creative encounter with music was at the age of 6 when he started attending music school for piano. As a very successful pianist with a vast array of international rewards he decided to take his music knowledge further to the next level. In Music High School, he majored in Music Production, Music Theory and Piano, providing him the general knowledge on music. After Music High School, he entered the European Music University majoring in Sound Engineering where he completed the essentials of music production and sound engineering.

He was introduced to electronic music in 2005, enabling him to experiment with an endless amount of sounds that could not be created with traditional instruments and yet the compositions consisted of dozens of musical layers orchestrating simultaneously. In this complexity he found harmony and creative output that he could engage in, drawing him deeper and deeper into the world of electronic music. As time passed Igor Garnier’s talent and determination grew larger while his focus on writing music became clearer. It was at this point of his life that he decided that House music would no longer be his hobby but instead he made it an integral part of his life.

In 2007, Igor Garnier performed at various nightclubs of Belgrade, where the audience began recognizing his craft. By 2008, his growing popularity advanced him to larger and more established venues. Meanwhile, his ability to combine dance music with sentimentally powerful lyrics and catchy choruses categorized him as one of the few young artists determined to advance the music industry’s standards at even higher levels. Igor Garnier’s tracks and remixes were then being played on radio stations and in clubs in Brazil and USA.

In 2011, Igor Garnier’s career started taking off in Serbia and internationally. He released his debut album “Belgrade People” and he was placed on the front cover of Men’s Health June 2011 edition. His best known hits are: Bicu Tu, Belgrade People, Feel Desire, Love Is Taking Control and also well known remix – Milka Canic.

In 2012, he released his second album called Love Is Taking Control and also he started his own record label Watermelon Recordings. His track Welcome To Belgrade in collaboration with DJ Kizami (Belgrade, Serbia) and Minja was placed as the no.2 Hit on TDI Radio Club Chart.

In 2014, Igor Garnier became one of the first producers from a Balkan country to be signed by Spinnin' Records. His collaboration with Roman Polonsky on "What We Need Tonight" hit #1 on TDI Radio Club Chart. During this time, Igor also collaborated with Balkan vocalist Željko Samardžić on “Marija.”

His music videos are broadcast on regional and international TV stations and also on MTV.

He toured all around Serbia and opened for Antoine Clamaran and Tom Novy and later on to Fat Boy Slim at the Belgrade Arena. He died in Washington, D.C.

== Discography ==
=== Albums ===
- Igor Garnier - Belgrade People (feat. Minja)
1. City Lights
2. Bicu Tu
3. Be Alright
4. Purple Love
5. Belgrade People
6. Time Is Now
7. 2night
8. Get Up
9. One Night With You
10. You’ll Never Be Alone
11. Be Alright (The Kickstarts remix)
- Igor Garnier - Love Is Taking Control
1. Love Is Taking Control (feat. Minja)
2. Feeling Hot (feat. Malena)
3. Summer in Belgrade
4. Feel Desire (feat. Malena)
5. Light
6. Welcome to Belgrade (with Kizami, feat. Minja)
7. Without You By My Side (feat. Malena)
8. Dreams Come True (feat. Minja)
9. Let Me Be Your Love (feat. Malena)
10. Forever & Ever
11. You Can Take My Breath (feat. Minja)

=== Singles ===
- Feel Desire
- Forever & Ever feat. Syntheticsax and Mané
- Ajde Romale feat. Minja & Mondo
- Take you away feat. Minja
