= Walter Libuda =

German painter and plastic artist (1950–2021)

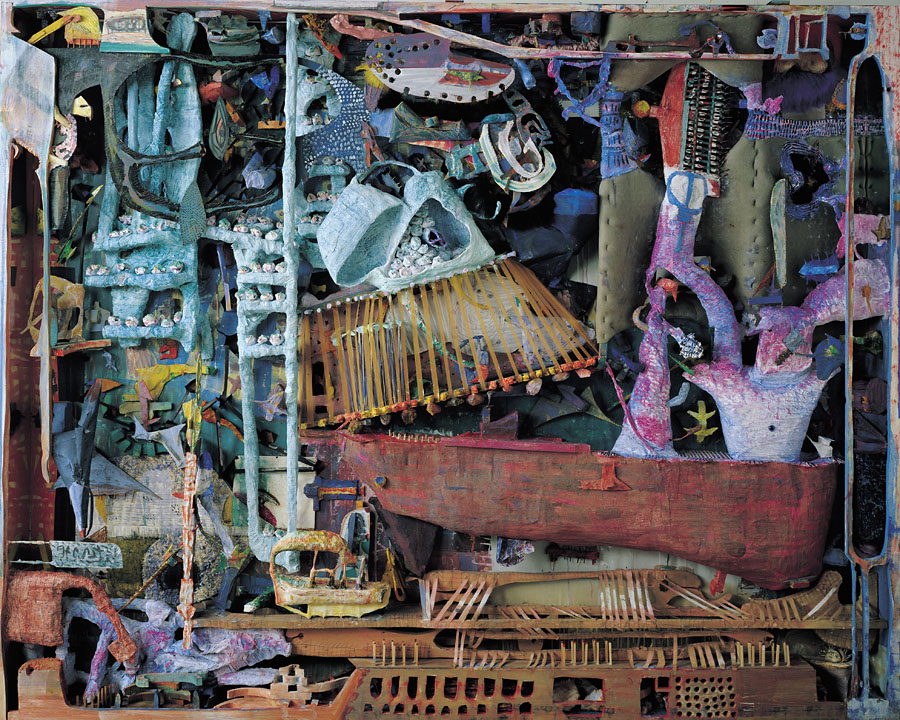
- Schatten-Wand (1998)
- Born: 24 June 1950; Zechau, East Germany
- Died: 6 July 2021 (aged 71); Berlin, Germany
- Occupations: Painter; Plastic artist

Walter Libuda (24 June 1950 – 6 July 2021) was a German painter and plastic artist.

== Biography ==
From 1968 to 1971, Libuda painted sets at the Landestheater Altenburg. From 1973 to 1978, he studied at the Hochschule für Grafik und Buchkunst Leipzig. In the two years following, he was an apprentice of Bernhard Heisig. He returned to school in Leipzig and served as an assistant professor from 1979 to 1985. He then moved to Berlin. He became a member of the Neue Gruppe in Munich in 1991, the Deutscher Künstlerbund in 1992, and the Sächsische Akademie der Künste in 1998. In 1998, he received the Gerhard-Altenbourg Preis, awarded by the Berlinische Galerie. In addition to sculptures and paintings, he made ceramics and bronze works.

Walter Libuda died in Berlin on 6 July 2021 at the age of 71.
