= Juan Carlos Del Bello =

Argentine academic (1951–2021)

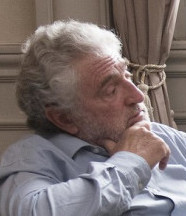
Del Bello in 2019

Juan Carlos Del Bello (5 June 1951 – 19 July 2021) was an Argentine academic. He was director of the National Institute of Statistics and Census from 2002 to 2003 and rector of National University of Río Negro since 2008.
