= Rosario Casado =

Spanish politician and pharmacist (1961–2021)

Member of the Senate of Spain
- In office 14 March 2004 – 14 January 2008
- Constituency: Albacete

Personal details
- Born: Rosario Begoña Casado Sobrino; 1961 Almería, Spain
- Died: 15 July 2021 (aged 59–60) Albacete, Spain
- Party: PP

Rosario Begoña Casado Sobrino (1961 – 15 July 2021) was a Spanish politician and pharmacist. A member of the People's Party (PP), she served in the Senate of Spain from 2004 to 2008.

== Biography ==
After earning her pharmacy license, she owned and operated a pharmacy in Albacete. She was a member of the Regional Executive Committee of the People's Party in Albacete, serving in the city council and once running for Mayor. She later served as a Senator in the 8th legislature of Spain from 2004 to 2008, serving in the Mixed Commission for Women's Rights and Equal Opportunities, Health and Consumer Commission, and the Joint Commission on Health, Consumption, Labor and Social Affairs.

Rosario Casado died in Albacete on 15 July 2021.
