= Evgenia Kirichenko =

Russian historian (1931–2021)

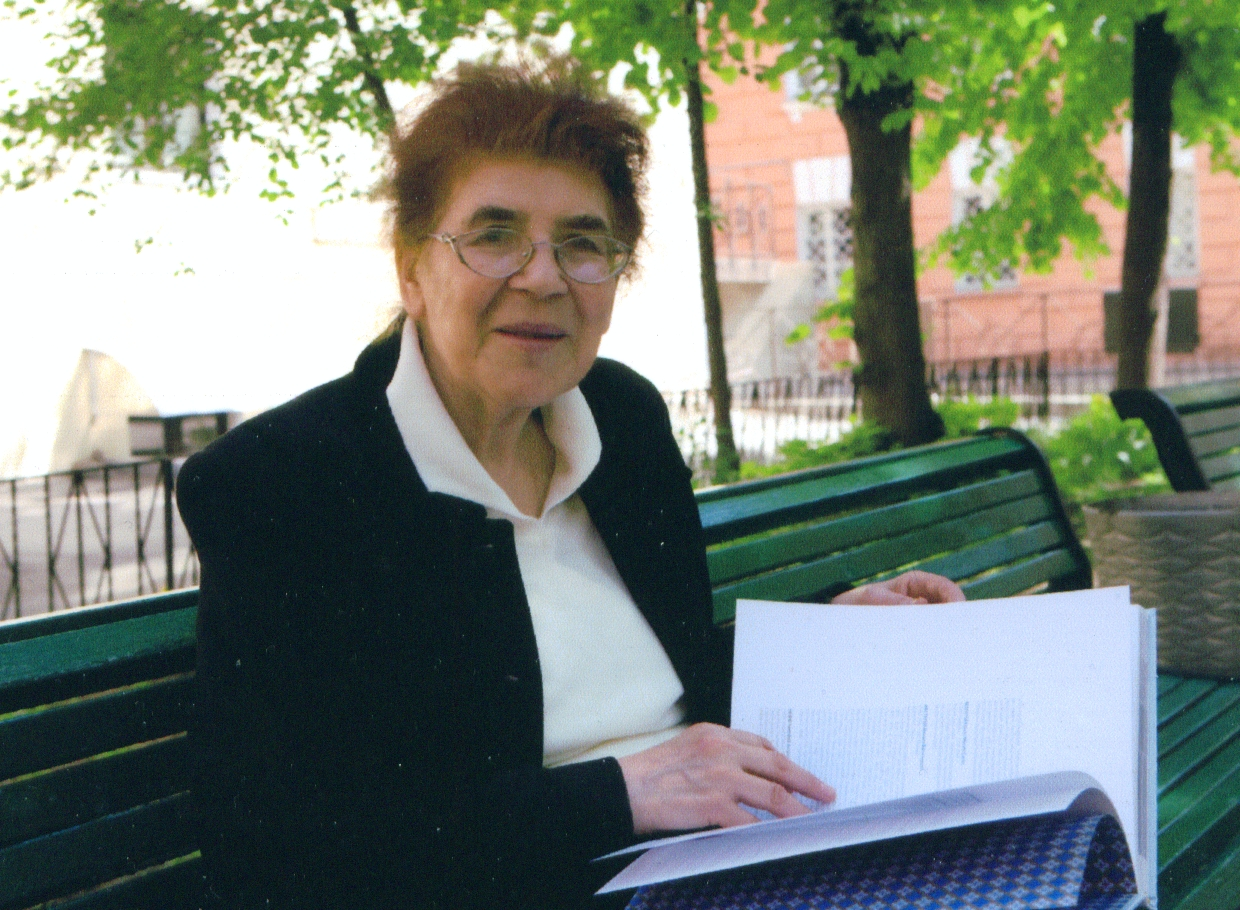
- Born: 5 January 1931; Kharkiv, Ukrainian SSR, Soviet Union
- Died: 1 July 2021 (aged 90); Moscow, Russia
- Occupation: Historian

Evgenia Ivanovna Kirichenko (Russian: Евгения Ивановна Кириченко; 5 January 1931 – 1 July 2021) was a Russian historian of architecture and art. She was an honorary member of the Russian Academy of Arts and was a recipient of the State Prize of the Russian Federation.

== Biography ==
Kirichenko was born into a family of civil engineers from Zaporizhzhia. Her father, Ivan, received the Stalin State Prize for his metalwork. During her childhood, she suffered through the German occupation and starvation. In 1953, she began studying art at Moscow State University. She earned a degree in architecture in 1964, a doctorate in history in 1990, and received the State Prize of the Russian Federation in 1998.

Kirichenko died in Moscow on 1 July 2021 at the age of 90.

== Work ==
After presenting a paper on architecture in the Russian Empire from the 18th and 19th centuries, she began research on architecture in Spain, Switzerland, Canada, Portugal, the Balkans, Latin America, and elsewhere. In 1978, she published a monogram titled "Russian Architecture from the 1830s to the 1910s", which enjoyed great success. She wrote six books and 30 papers on Fyodor Schechtel, and was well known by the scientific community for her research on the restoration of the Cathedral of Christ the Saviour in Moscow. She received a diploma from the American Institute of Architects for her English-language version of the book The Russian Style.
