= Mat George =

American podcast host (1995–2021)

- Born: May 14, 1995
- Died: July 17, 2021 (aged 26); Los Angeles, California, US
- Known for: Podcast host

Mat Thomas George (May 14, 1995 – July 17, 2021) was an American podcast host and Internet personality, known for his work on the podcast She Rates Dogs and numerous viral tweets. In 2017, he went viral for measuring the size of a microwave oven with bottles of New Amsterdam vodka. He graduated from Arizona State University in 2017.

He was killed in a hit and run collision in Los Angeles at the age of 26.
