= Antoni Rajkiewicz =

Polish politician (1922–2021)

Antoni Rajkiewicz (Poland, 11 June 1922 – 24 July 2021) was a Polish academic and politician.
