= Yves Goussebaire-Dupin =

French politician (1930–2021)

Mayor of Dax
- In office 1977–1995
- Preceded by: Max Moras
- Succeeded by: Jacques Forté

Member of the Senate of France
- In office 25 September 1983 – 1 October 1992
- Preceded by: Gérard Minvielle
- Succeeded by: Jean-Louis Carrère
- Constituency: Landes

Personal details
- Born: 19 July 1930 France
- Died: 15 July 2021 (aged 90) France
- Party: UDF

Yves Goussebaire-Dupin (19 July 1930 – 15 July 2021) was a French politician. A member of the Union for French Democracy, he served as Mayor of Dax from 1977 to 1995 and was in the Senate of France from 1983 to 1992.
