= Satish Kalsekar =

Indian writer (died 2021)

Satish Harishchandra Kalsekar
- Born: 1942/1943; British Raj
- Died: 24 July 2021 (aged 78–79); Pen, India
- Citizenship: Indian
- Occupations: Poet, Writer
- Writing career
- Language: Marathi
- Notable works: वाचणाऱ्याची रोजनिशी, इंद्रियोपनिषद, साक्षात, विलंबित
- Notable awards: Sahitya Akademi Award

Satish Kalsekar (1942/1943 – 24 July 2021) was a Marathi-language poet and essayist. He was awarded the Sahitya Akademi Award in 2013 for his essay collection Vachanaryachi Rojanishee. His popular collections of poems are Indriyopnishad (इंद्रियोपनिषद), Sakshat (साक्षात) and Vilambit (विलंबित).
