= Awa Diop =

Senegalese politician (1948–2021)

- Born: 1948|May|1
- Died: 2021|July|21
- Citizenship: Senegalese
- Occupation: Politician

Awa Diop (1 May 1948 – 21 July 2021) was a Senegalese politician and an early militant of the Senegalese Democratic Party (PDS). She was a deputy in the National Assembly and a minister under the presidency of Abdoulaye Wade.

== Life and career ==
Diop was born in Rufisque, Senegal, French West Africa, France.

Trained as a stenographer, she first worked as a secretary at the town hall of Rufisque, then at Aristide Le Dantec Hospital in Dakar.

On 2 February 1975, she joined the Democratic Party of Senegal (PDS) –founded in 1974– upon Abdoulaye Wade's visit to her native town. She stood out for her activism and her combativeness and was notably arrested twice for "unauthorised demonstrations" in 1988 and 1993.

Diop was elected as a deputy to the National Assembly for the first time in 1993. She was appointed a deputy minister to the Prime Minister on 16 October 2006 and kept that position during the 27 February 2007 government reshuffle. However, this office was disestablished with the formation of the Soumaré Government on 5 July 2007.

== Death ==
Diop died in 2021.
