= Kim Hong-bin =

South Korean mountaineer and skier (1964–2021)

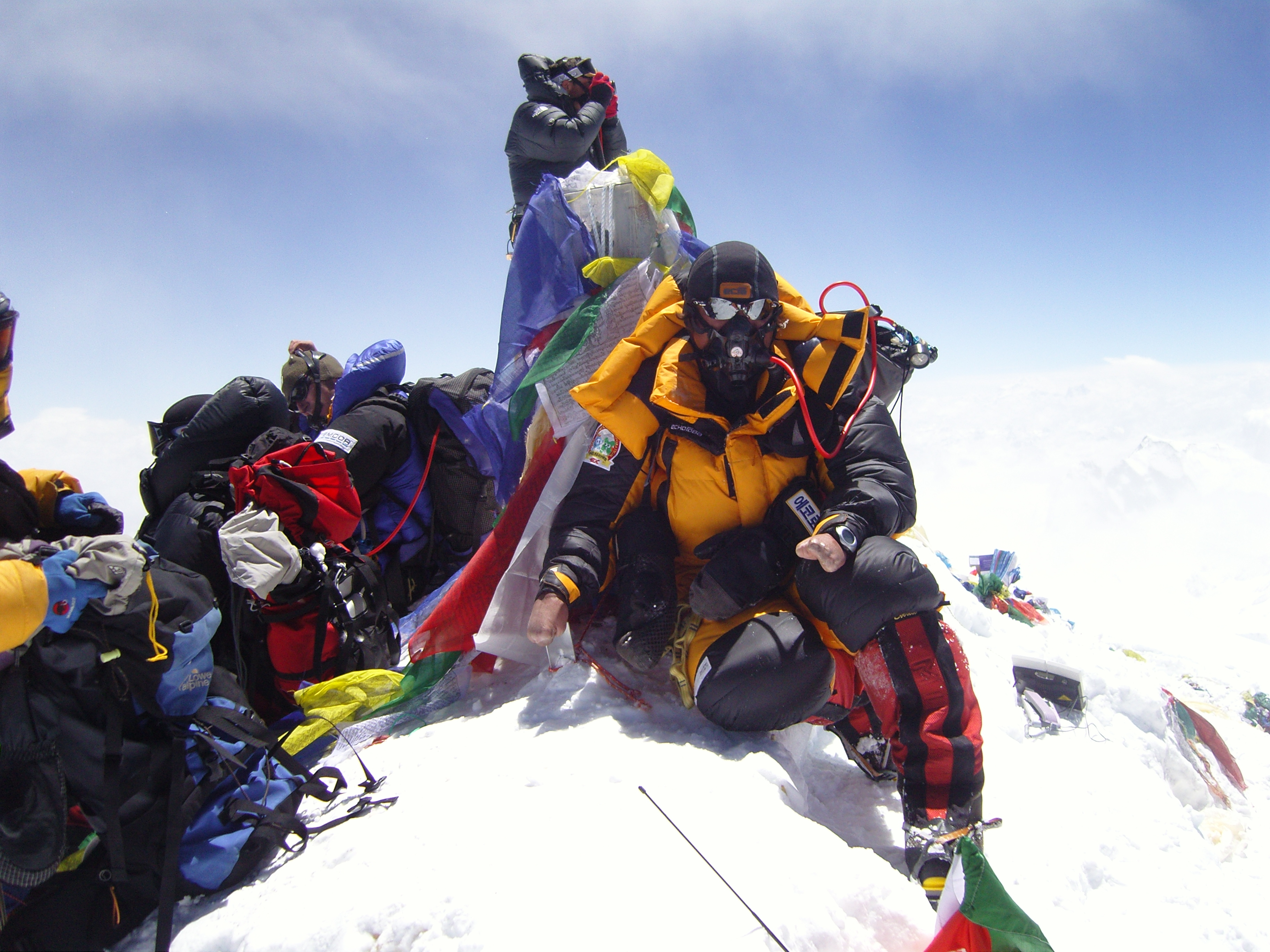
Kim Hong-bin on summit of Everest, 2007

Kim Hong-bin (Korean: 김홍빈; 20 November 1964 – disappeared 19 July 2021) was a South Korean mountain climber and skier.

In 1991, he lost all of his fingers while climbing Denali.

On 18 July 2021, he reached the Broad Peak summit (8,051m), becoming the first disabled person to climb all of the world's 14 peaks over 8,000 meters. However, he fell into a crevasse on the way down from the summit and was presumed dead.

== Mountains climbed ==
S.no.	Peak (height)	Year
1.	Everest (8848).	2007
2.	K2 (8611 m).	2012
3.	Kangchenjunga (8586 m).	2013
4.	Lhotse (8516 m).	2017
5.	Makalu (8485 m).	2008
6.	Cho Oyu (8188 m).	2011
7.	Dhaulagiri (8167 m).	2009
8.	Manaslu (8163 m).	2014
9.	Nanga Parbat (8125 m).	2017
10.	Annapurna I (8091 m).	2018
11.	Gasherbrum I (8080 m).	2019
12.	Broad Peak (8051 m).	2021
13.	Gasherbrum II (8034 m).	2006
14.	Shisha Pangma (8027 m).	2006
