= Barbara J. Litrell =

American publisher (1944–2021)

Barbara J. Litrell (February 4, 1944 – July 4, 2021) was an American publisher. She was the publisher of McCall's, then of Working Mother and Working Woman. In 1999, she became president of MacDonald Communications Corporation, the parent company of the magazines.
