= Murod Khanturaev =

Uzbekistani mixed martial artist (1987–2021)

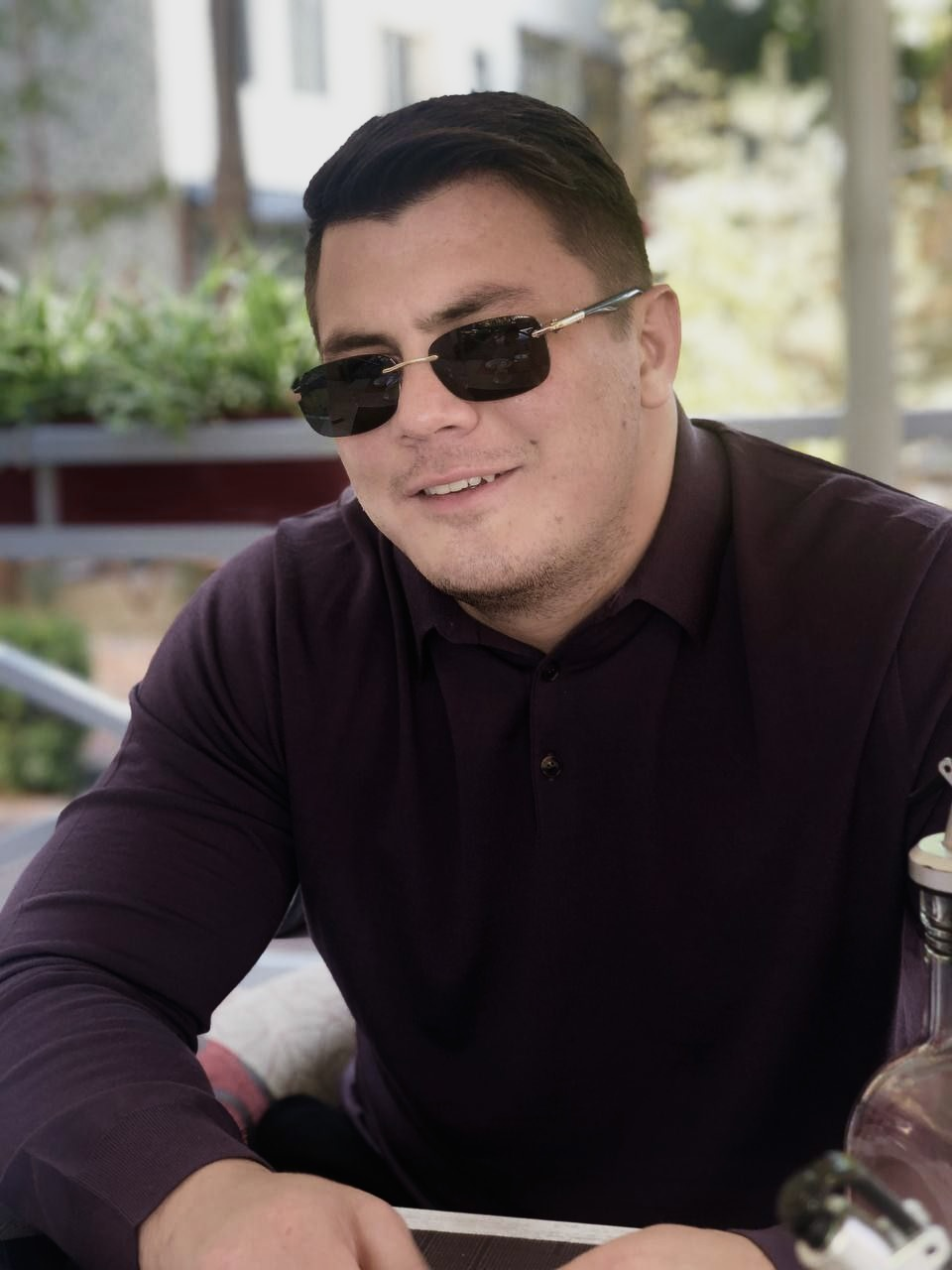
- Born: 4 July 1987; Uzbek SSR, Soviet Union
- Died: July 19, 2021 (aged 34). Tashkent, Uzbekistan; Car Accident
- Native name: Murod Xanturayev
- Other names: Asian Bear
- Height: 182 cm (6 ft 0 in)
- Weight: 93 kg (205 lb; 14 st 9 lb)
- Division: Light heavyweight
- Reach: 76 in (193 cm)
- Style: Hand-to-hand combat
- Stance: Orthodox
- Fighting out of: Uzbekistan
- Team: OU7 Team; Khanturaev Team
- Trainer: Asad Urinov, Nodir Qodirov, Mikhail Dmitrievich, Yura Bazarov
- Years active: 2000–2013, 2013–2021 (MMA)

Mixed martial arts record
- Total: 14
- Wins: 12
- By knockout: 8
- By submission: 4
- Losses: 2
- By knockout: 2

Other information
- University: Plekhanov Russian University of Economics
- Children: 3
- Mixed martial arts record from Sherdog

Murod Khanturaev (Uzbek: Murod Xontorayev, 4 July 1987 – 19 July 2021), was an Uzbek mixed martial artist. Prior to his death, he served as Vice President of the MMA Federation of Uzbekistan.

== Biography ==
Murod Khanturaev was born on July 4, 1987, in Tashkent, Uzbek SSR to a middle-class family. He was grateful for a happy childhood and for the fact that the family did not need anything.

At the age of seventeen, Murod Khanturaev was honored to become the champion of Asia in universal combat among adults. This victory for the fighter was extremely important, after he met a man, and later this man turned out to be his coach. In 2013 he held his professional fight. He was the vice-president of the Uzbekistan Mixed Martial Arts Association.

=== Family ===
- Father: Muhammad Usmon Khanturaev
- Mother: Umida Khanturaeva
- Brother: Toxir Khanturaev
- Wife: Dilnozakhan Khanturaeva

==== Children ====
- Ayubkhon Khanturaev September 1, 2012.
- Yasinkhon Khanturaev February 15, 2015.
- Muhammad Khanturaev May 2, 2019

== Mixed martial arts record ==
Murod Khanturaev's Mixed Martial Arts record.

Professional record breakdown
14 matches	12 wins	2 losses
By knockout	8	2
By submission	4	0

== Death ==
Khanturaev died in a car accident near Tashkent on July 19, 2021.
