= Isaac Ngahane =

Cameroonian politician (1954–2021)

Member of the National Assembly of Cameroon
- In office 2002 – 31 July 2021
- Constituency: Wouri Est

Personal details
- Born: 9 August 1954 Bangangté, French Cameroon
- Died: 31 July 2021 (aged 66) Douala, Cameroon
- Party: CPDM

Isaac Ngahane (9 August 1954 – 31 July 2021) was a Cameroonian politician.

== Biography ==
Ngahane studied at the École Protestante in Manjo and the Collège d’enseignement secondaire de Bonabéri in Douala.

He ran for the National Assembly in 2002, winning a seat to represent Wouri Est. He was a member of the Cameroon People's Democratic Movement's Central Committee.

As an incumbent deputy, Isaac Ngahane died in Douala on 31 July 2021 at the age of 66.
