= Ava Preacher =

American college dean

- Born: July 18, 1953; Washington, D.C., U.S.
- Died: July 14, 2021 (aged 67); South Bend, Indiana, U.S.
- Other names: Ava Preacher Collins
- Occupations: Professor, college administrator

Ava Preacher (July 18, 1953 – July 14, 2021) was an American gender studies professor and assistant dean of the College of Arts and Letters at the University of Notre Dame.

== Early life ==
Preacher was born in Washington, D.C., and raised in Davenport, Iowa, the daughter of Charles B. Preacher and Ava Moore Preacher. Her father was a pathologist and her mother was a nurse. As a teen she wrote for a youth newspaper. In Davenport, she attended St. Katharine's School, where she graduated valedictorian. She later completed a bachelor's degree and a master's degree in comparative literature at the University of Iowa.

== Career ==
Preacher taught at the University of Iowa and at Wayne State University early in her career. She taught at Notre Dame, beginning in 1985 as an adjunct professor in the Department of Communication and Theater. She directed the Gender Studies Program for three years. From 1993 until 2018, she was assistant dean of the College of Arts and Letters. Her focus was in pre-law education, and guiding undergraduates through the process of applying to law schools. She was also the college's sexual assault resource person, and faculty advisor of the Campus Alliance for Rape Elimination.

Preacher was twice president of the Midwest Association of Pre-Law Advisors, and program chair of the Pre-Law Advisors’ National Conferences in 2004 and 2008. In 2010, she received the Congressman Neil Smith Award from the American Mock Trial Association, for "her national role in pre-law advising." She was one of the many Notre Dame faculty members who signed a 2016 letter against the Professor Watchlist project.

== Publications ==
- Film Theory Goes to the Movies (1993, with Jim Collins and Hilary Radner)

== Personal life ==
Preacher and James M. Collins graduated from high school together in 1971, and married in 1975. They had two daughters, Ava and Nell, and divorced by 1995. She married Coleen Hoover in 2011, after many years together. She died in 2021, aged 67 years, at home in South Bend.
