= Erin Gilmer =

American disability activist and lawyer (1982–2021)

- Born: September 27, 1982; Wheat Ridge, Colorado, U.S.
- Died: July 7, 2021 (aged 38); Centennial, Colorado, U.S.
- Education: University of Colorado Boulder (JD)
- Occupations: Disability rights activist, lawyer
- Known for: Work aimed at lowering drug prices and making health care provisions more compassionate

Erin Gilmer (September 27, 1982 – July 7, 2021) was an American disability activist and lawyer. She was known for her work aimed at lowering drug prices and making health care provisions more compassionate.

== Biography ==
Gilmer was born in Wheat Ridge, Colorado, to Carol Yvonne Troyer and Thomas S. Gilmer, respectively a pharmacist and physician. She studied psychology and economics at the University of Colorado, Boulder, and in 2008 graduated from its law school with a Juris Doctor degree. She then moved to Texas and worked for various health care nonprofits as well as the state government before returning to Denver in 2012. She died in Centennial in 2021. The reported cause was suicide.

== Activism ==
Gilmer was known for protesting increase of insulin price, and for her work to authorize pharmacists to deliver drugs for chronically ill patients who are unable to renew their prescription due to the unavailability of their physician. She was involved as a patient-expert in medical research. She had a number of complicated health conditions and wanted to help other people in similar situations.
