= Mundardjito =

Indonesian archeologist (1936–2021)

Mundardjito (8 November 1936 – 2 July 2021) was an Indonesian archeologist.

== Biography ==
Mundardjito has been a permanent lecturer from 1964 to 2001 at the University of Indonesia and was Chair of the UI Archeology Department from 1970 to 1972. He also served as Assistant Dean III of the UI Faculty of Letters from 1972 to 1976. He was appointed Professor of UI in 2001 and in 2001 decided to retire at the age of 65.

Mundardjito has introduced the methodology and theory of archeology in Indonesia as well as developed a new branch of archeology, namely ecological and spatial archeology in 1993, which he introduced in his dissertation. In addition to this, Mundardjito also became one of the compilers of the Archaeological Code of Ethics in 1997 at the meeting of the Indonesian Archaeological Experts Association (IAAI), which he founded on February 4, 1976 with his colleagues.
