= Harold A. Gould =

American anthropologist (1926–2021)

- Born: 18 February 1926
- Died: 2 July 2021 (aged 95); Delray Beach, Florida, U.S.

Academic background
- Education: Saint Louis University

Academic work
- Main interests: Indian society and civilization
- Notable ideas: Desacralization of Hindu caste system Grass roots politics

Harold Alton Gould (18 February 1926 – 2 July 2021) was an American anthropologist specializing in Indian society and civilization. He is an author of numerous books on various aspects of Indian society including the caste system, religion, politics and international relations.

== Life and career ==
Gould received his PhD in anthropology at the Saint Louis University in 1959. From 1968 to 1991, he worked as a professor of anthropology at the University of Illinois at Urbana-Champaign and served as the director of its Center for Asian Studies. Since 1991, he has been a visiting professor in the Center for South Asian Studies at the University of Virginia.

Gould visited Lucknow University in India during 1954–55 as a Fulbright scholar, conducting anthropological field work in the village communities of the Faizabad district. Since then, he made numerous research trips to India, spending over 10 years in the country over a span of 50 years. His research encompasses every facet of Indian society and civilization, including rural society, caste, religion, local politics, electoral processes, and national and international politics.

== Works ==
Books

- The Hindu Caste System, Vol. 1: Sacralization of a Social Order (Delhi: Chanakya Publications, 1987), ISBN 8170010233.
- The Hindu Caste System, Vol 2: Caste Adaptation in Modernizing Indian Society (Delhi: Chanakya Publications, 1988). ISBN 8170010454.
- The Hindu Caste System, Vol. 3: Politics and Caste (Delhi: Chanakya Publications, 1990). ISBN 8170010551.
- India Votes: Alliance Politics and Minority Government in the Ninth and Tenth General Elections (co-edited with Sumit Ganguly, Westview Press, 1993).
- The Hope and the Reality: US-Indian Relations from Roosevelt to Reagan (co-edited with Sumit Ganguly, Westview Press, 1992).
- Grass Roots Politics in India: Century of Political Evolution in Faizabad District (Oxford & IBH, 1995), ISBN 8120408985.
- India and the United States in a Changing World (co-edited with Ashok Kapur, Y. K. Malik and Arthur G. Rubinoff, SAGE, 2002), ISBN 9780761995920.
- Sikhs, Swamis, Students and Spies: The India Lobby in the United States, 1900-1946 (SAGE, 2006), ISBN 9780761934806.
- The South Asia Story: The first sixty years of US relations with India and Pakistan (SAGE, 2010), ISBN 9788132105503, ISBN 9788132101215.

Selected articles

- Gould, Harold A. (1963), "The adaptive functions of caste in contemporary Indian society", Asian Survey, 3 (9): 427–438, doi:10.2307/3023463, JSTOR 3023463
- Gould, Harold A (1967), "Priest and contrapriest: A structural analysis of Jajmani relationships in the Hindu plains and the Nilgiri Hills", Contributions to Indian Sociology, 1 (1): 26–55, doi:10.1177/006996676700100103, S2CID 144921247
- Gould, Harold A. (1966). "Religion and Politics in a UP Constituency". In Donald Eugene Smith (ed.). South Asian Politics and Religion. Princeton University Press. ISBN 9780598348753.
- Gould, Harold A. (1974). "The emergence of modern Indian politics: Political development in Faizabad, Part I: 1884-1935". Journal of Commonwealth & Comparative Politics. 12 (1): 20–41. doi:10.1080/14662047408447200.
- Gould, Harold A. (1974). "The emergence of modern Indian politics: Political development in Faizabad, Part II: 1935 to independence". Journal of Commonwealth & Comparative Politics. 12 (2): 157–188. doi:10.1080/14662047408447209.
- Gould, Harold A. (1980). "The second coming: The 1980 elections in India's Hindi belt". Asian Survey. 20 (6): 595–616. doi:10.2307/2643675. JSTOR 2643675.
- Gould, Harold A. (1986) [first published in 1958]. "The Hindu Jajmani system: A case of economic particularism". Journal of Anthropological Research. 42 (3): 269–278. doi:10.1086/jar.42.3.3630033. JSTOR 3630033. S2CID 164138509.
- Gould, Harold A. (1986). "A sociological perspective on the eighth general election in India". Asian Survey. 26 (6): 630–652. doi:10.2307/2644128. JSTOR 2644128.
- Gould, Harold A. (1988). "Anticommunism and anticolonialism: The domestic determinantsof developing U.S.-Indian relations during the Truman era". Asian Affairs: An American Review. 15 (4): 194–203. doi:10.1080/00927678.1988.10553628. JSTOR 30172316.
- Gould, Harold A. (1991). "The Babri Masjid and the secular contract". In Veena Das; Dipankar Gupta; Patricia Uberoi (eds.). Tradition,, Pluralism and Identity: In Honour of TN Madan. New Delhi: SAGE. pp. 381–400. ISBN 978-0761993810.

== Reception ==
Robert I. Crane of the Syracuse University, reviewing Gould's The Hindu Caste System, Volume 1, calls it a "masterful study" of the highly complex Hindu system of caste with insightful and informed analysis. His discussion of "priests and contrapriests" contains stimulating ideas and guides the larger thrust of the volume. Also noteworthy for Crane is the chapter on Hindu jajmani system, with the best known evaluation of the jajmani relationships. However, Crane questions Gould's position on the primacy of religious value system and wonders if he might have overlooked the possibility of power-cum-economic interests having coopted the religious values.

Lloyd I. Rudolph of the University of Chicago, reviewing Gould's Grass Roots Politics in India, calls it a "masterful account" of a century of political evolution in the Faizabad district (from roughly 1869 when the Faizabad Municipal Board was established to the 1970 by-elections in the Tanda constituency). Gould's objective is to analyze and explain India's "political systems," how a political system of national proportions came into being and has functioned at the grass roots. Following the model of Paul Brass in Factional Politics in an Indian State, Gould views the Indian National Congress as a coalition of state parties, and the state parties themselves as coalitions of semi-independent district party organizations. It is at the district level that Congress party organizations interact with the traditional societies. Gould's principal vehicle for explaining the nexus between the traditional society and the party politics is "caste demographics." Gould, being a pioneer in the analysis of the "desacralized" caste system (caste delinked from religious and ritual dimensions and viewed as an "ethnic group"), shows how caste can, and has, become the vehicle for political participation and social transformation. Rudolph finds Gould's analysis powerful and persuasive, but wonders how much a district level analysis can be used to explain India's political system. Do we not see the influence of ideology, leadership and agency (taken as examples of "top down" phenomena) as much as the caste demographics in shaping the local politics?
