= Ramadhar Kashyap =

Indian politician (1964–2021)

Ramadhar Kashyap (26 November 1936 – 6 July 2021) was a politician from the Indian National Congress party. He served as member of the Parliament of India representing Chhattisgarh in the Rajya Sabha, the upper house of the Indian Parliament, from 2002 until 2008.
