= Tadeusz Lewandowski =

Polish politician (1944–2021)

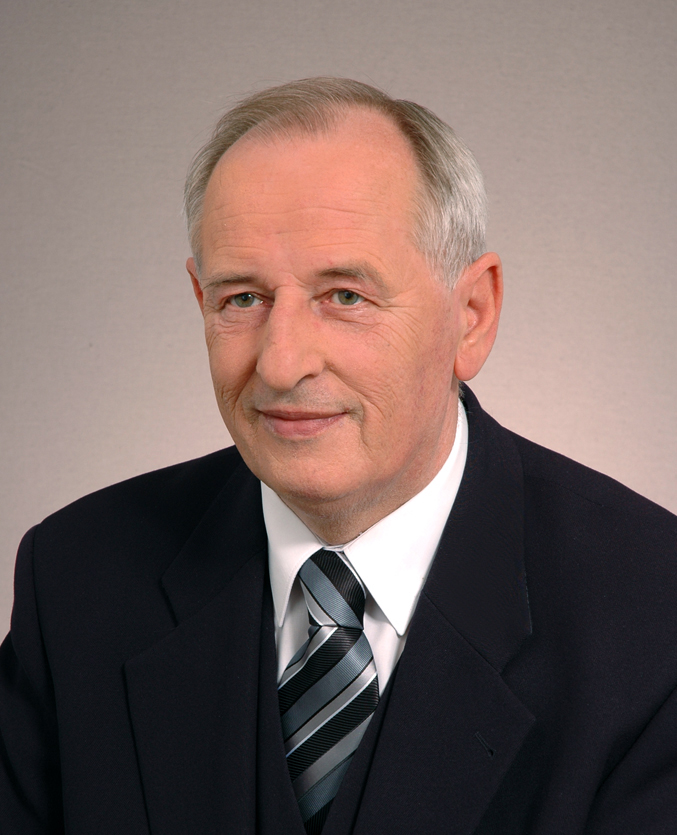
Tadeusz Lewandowski

Tadeusz Stefan Lewandowski (6 January 1944 – 10 July 2021) was a Polish Law and Justice politician who served in the Sejm (1997–2001 and 2005–2007).
