= Pierre Guitton =

French painter and comic book author (1944–2021)

- Born: 16 March 1944; Loches, France
- Died: 20 July 2021 (aged 77)
- Occupations: Painter; Comic book author

Pierre Guitton (16 March 1944 – 20 July 2021) was a French painter and comic book author and artist. He notably designed the pages of Charlie Mensuel and Hara-Kiri.

== Biography ==
Guitton studied at the École supérieure des beaux-arts de Tours, where he earned a degree in painting in 1962. In 1969, he began his career at Charlie Mensuel. In 1971, he founded the magazine Zinc alongside Nicoulaud, where they published underground comic strip reviews. The magazine folded in 1974.

From 1975 to 1987, Guitton published his designs and comic strips in Charlie Mensuel Hara-Kiri, À Suivre, and Zero. In 1987, he ceased collaboration with all magazines and devoted himself to painting. He became a well-known painter throughout Indre-et-Loir, participating in multiple artistic exhibitions and cultural manifestations.

In 2011, a retrospective titled Pierre Guitton rétrospective : Et c'est pas fini ! was published. It highlighted his designs published in Charlie Mensuel and Zinc. In 2018, another retrospective titled Contes du Lapin jaune covered his publications in À Suivre from 1985 to 1987.

Pierre Guitton died on 20 July 2021 at the age of 77.

== Publications ==
- Tout doit disparaître (1978)
- Et c’est pas fini ! : rétrospective Pierre Guitton (2011)
- Les contes de Lapin Jaune (2018)
