= Anima Guha =

Indian writer (1932–2021)

- Born: 26 March 1932; Dhubri, Assam, British Raj
- Died: 29 July 2021 (aged 89)
- Education: Pune University (PhD in anthropology)
- Occupation: Writer
- Spouse: Amalendu Guha
- Writing career
- Language: Assamese; English

Anima Guha (26 March 1932 – 29 July 2021) was an Indian writer from Assam. She was a literary pensioner who published numerous novels, essays, articles, translations, and travelogues. Guha also published a number of research papers in scientific journals, in addition to attending many seminars and conferences.

== Education and personal life ==
Anima Guha was born on 26 March 1932, to Niharika Das and Girindra Mohan Das at Dhubri. She started her school days at Kokrajhar LP School. She cleared Matriculation in the First Division from Jorhat Government Girls High School in 1947. In 1949, she passed her I.SC in the First division from Cotton College. She graduated from the Botany Department of Cotton College affiliated from Gauhati University.

Following her marriage to historian and economist Amalendu Guha, Anima Guha completed her master's degree. She received a PhD in anthropology from Pune University.

== Career ==
She worked as a pool officer at the Council of Scientific and Industrial Research from 1980 to 1984, in addition to being a postdoctoral fellow at the Anthropological Survey of India, Calcutta (1976–1989). From 1985 to 1990, she worked as a University Grants Commission's research associate at Calcutta University's department of anthropology, focusing on the genetics of birth abnormalities and indigenous health practices among Assamese tribal communities and other backward populations.

She has also presented papers at the International Congress of Anthropological and Ethnological Science held in Zagreb (Yugoslavia) and in New Delhi.

== Death ==
Guha died on 29 July 2021, due to age-related issues, at Arya Hospital in Guwahati.
