= Enzo Polidori =

Italian politician (1936–2021)

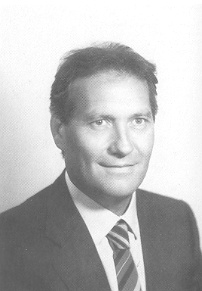
- Polidori as a Deputy

Member of the Chamber of Deputies of Italy
- In office 12 July 1983 – 22 April 1992
- Constituency: Pisa-Livorno-Lucca-Massa Carrara

Mayor of Piombino
- In office 7 May 1976 – 12 May 1983
- Preceded by: Rolando Tamburini
- Succeeded by: Paolo Benesperi

Personal details
- Born: 21 November 1936 Piombino, Italy
- Died: 3 July 2021 (aged 84) Piombino, Italy
- Party: PCI; PDS; DS; PD

Enzo Polidori (21 November 1936 – 3 July 2021) was an Italian politician. A member of the Italian Communist Party, he served as Mayor of Piombino from 1976 to 1983. In 1983, he received 30,584 votes and was elected to the Chamber of Deputies. He was re-elected in 1987 with 22,557 votes.

== Biography ==
After graduating from technical high school (ITI), he joined Ilva, where he remained until 1976. A member of the Italian Communist Party, he served as mayor of Piombino from 1976 to 1983, when, having received 30,584 votes in the general election, he was elected to the Chamber of Deputies; he was re-elected in the 1987 general election with 22,557 votes, remaining in office until 1992.

In 1991, he joined the Democratic Party of the Left, then the Democrats of the Left, and finally the Democratic Party (Italy).
