= Josemith Bermúdez =

Venezuelan presenter and actress (1980–2021)

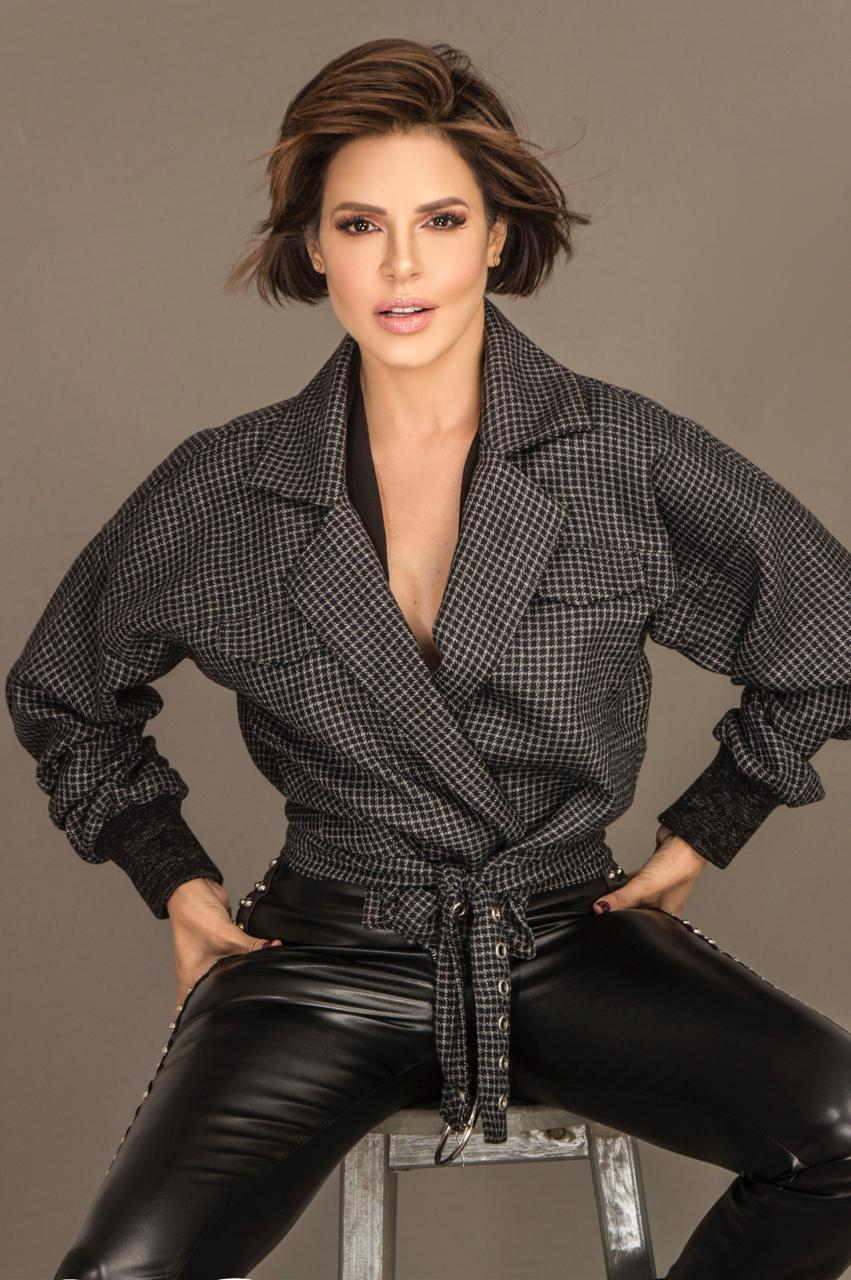
Josemith Bermúdez

Josemith Bermúdez (January 27, 1980 – July 31, 2021) was a Venezuelan actress and TV personality.

She died of ovarian cancer.
