= Deaths in June 2021 =

The following is a list of notable deaths in June 2021.

Entries for each day are listed alphabetically by surname. A typical entry lists information in the following sequence:

- Name, age, country of citizenship at birth, subsequent country of citizenship (if applicable), reason for notability, cause of death (if known), and reference.

== June 2021 ==
=== 1 ===
- Prince Amedeo, Duke of Aosta, 77, Italian royal, disputed head of the House of Savoy (since 2006), complications from surgery.
- Jane Bigelow, 92, Canadian politician, mayor of London, Ontario (1972–1978), complications from a fall.
- Steve Broussard, 71, American football player (Green Bay Packers).
- Leon Burtnett, 78, American football coach (Indianapolis Colts).
- Hichem Djait, 85, Tunisian Islamic scholar.
- Petr Dostál, 74, Czech geographer and professor (UJEM, Charles University).
- Silvio Francesconi, 68, Italian football player and manager, COVID-19.
- Tom Gibson, 90, Scottish-born Canadian photographer.
- Chris Goode, 48, British playwright, theatre director and actor, suicide.
- Román Hernández Onna, 71, Cuban chess grandmaster, respiratory failure.
- James D. Hornfischer, 55, American literary agent and naval historian.
- Hsing Yin Shean, 62, Malaysian politician, MP (1986–1990), COVID-19.
- Walter F. Huebner, 93, American astrophysicist.
- Khalid Jamai, 77, Moroccan political analyst, journalist and writer, cancer.
- Jacques Lacoursière, 89, Canadian television host, writer and historian.
- Bunny Matthews, 70, American cartoonist and writer, central nervous system lymphoma.
- Henrique Melmann, 90, Brazilian Olympic water polo player.
- Matthieu Messagier, 71, French poet.
- Leonard Norman, 73, British politician, connétable of Saint Clement, Jersey (since 2008).
- Jovino Novoa, 76, Chilean politician and lawyer, member (1998–2014) and president (2009–2010) of the Senate, emphysema.
- Vince Promuto, 82, American football player (Washington Redskins).
- Robert Rutman, 90, German-American visual artist and musician.
- Paula Sémer, 96, Belgian radio and TV presenter, and actress (Thuis).
- Adnan Al Sharqi, 79, Lebanese football player (Al Ansar) and manager (Al Nahda, national team).
- Ian Shearer, 79, New Zealand politician, MP (1975–1984), minister for the environment, science and technology and broadcasting (1981–1984).
- Samadagha Shikhlarov, 65, Azerbaijani footballer (Khazar Sumgayit, Neftçi Baku, FK Ganca), traffic collision.
- Melor Sturua, 93, Russian journalist (Izvestia).
- Ujwal Thapa, 44, Nepalese political activist and entrepreneur, COVID-19.
- Tram Iv Tek, 72, Cambodian politician, MP (2003–2008, since 2018), minister of public works and transport (2008–2016) and posts and telecommunications (2016–2020).
- Violeta Vidaurre, 92, Chilean actress (La Colorina, Pampa Ilusión, Romané), complications from Alzheimer's disease.
- Faizul Waheed, 56, Indian Islamic scholar, multiple organ failure.

=== 2 ===
- George G. Beasley, 89, American radio broadcaster.
- Fred Dewey, 63, American writer and artist, prostate cancer.
- Raymond J. Donovan, 90, American politician, secretary of labor (1981–1985), heart failure.
- Odero Gon, 88, Italian footballer (Palmanova, Udinese, Vittorio Falmec).
- Shah Abdul Hannan, 82, Bangladeshi Islamic philosopher, economist, and academic administrator.
- Carl Høgset, 79, Norwegian musician and choral conductor.
- Fritz Hollenbeck, 91, German actor (Uncle Bräsig).
- Jane Kaufman, 83, American artist, lung cancer.
- Manas Kongpan, 65, Thai human trafficker and military officer, heart attack.
- Pasión Kristal, 45, Mexican professional wrestler, drowned.
- Stanislav Lunin, 28, Kazakh footballer (Shakhter Karagandy, Kairat), cardiac arrest.
- Eric Mobley, 51, American basketball player (Milwaukee Bucks, Vancouver Grizzlies), cancer.
- Linah Mohohlo, 69, Motswana economist, governor of the Bank of Botswana (1999–2016) and chancellor of the University of Botswana (since 2017), COVID-19.
- Minoru Nakamura, 82, Japanese baseball player (Yomiuri Giants).
- James W. Pardew, 77, American diplomat, ambassador to Bulgaria (2002–2005).
- Luiz Pedro de Oliveira, 68, Brazilian journalist and politician, Maranhão MLA (1983–1987, 2003–2007), chief secretary of the cabinet (2007–2009).
- Giuseppe Perrino, 29, Italian footballer (Ebolitana, Battipagliese, Bellaria Igea Marina), heart attack.
- Evelyne Porret, 81, Swiss potter.
- Les Rackley, 92, British-born New Zealand boxing trainer.
- G. Ramachandran, 73, Indian film producer, COVID-19.
- David Rehling, 72, Danish lawyer and journalist.
- Bijayshree Routray, 67, Indian politician, Odisha MLA (since 1990), complications from COVID-19.
- Hasan Saltık, 57, Turkish record producer and free speech activist, heart attack.
- Ottorino Sartor, 75, Peruvian footballer (Defensor Arica, Atlético Chalaco, national team).
- Bill Scanlon, 64, American tennis player, cancer.
- Ganga Stone, 79, American social activist, founder of God's Love We Deliver.
- Piet A. Verheyen, 89, Dutch economist.
- Vince Woodman, 83, British racing driver.
- Tsutomu Yamazaki, 74, Japanese politician, member of the House of Councillors (1995–2007, 2010–2017) COVID-19.

=== 3 ===
- Afemata Tunumafono Apelu Aiavao, 90, Samoan journalist.
- Piero Attorrese, 91, Italian Olympic rower (1952).
- F. Lee Bailey, 87, American attorney (Sam Sheppard, O. J. Simpson, Patty Hearst).
- Lakshmi Nandan Bora, 89, Indian author, complications from COVID-19.
- Marcel Czermak, 79, French psychiatrist and psychoanalyst.
- Alajos Dornbach, 85, Hungarian politician and lawyer, member (1990–2002) and deputy speaker (1990–1994) of the National Assembly.
- Georgios Drys, 77, Greek politician, MP (1989–2004) and minister of agriculture (2001–2004).
- Wilfried Feichtinger, 70, Austrian gynaecologist.
- Roger Fisher, 84, English organist.
- Cathal Flynn, 87, Irish Gaelic footballer (Leitrim).
- Willemijn Fock, 78, Dutch art historian and professor (Leiden University).
- Robert Gordy, 89, American musician and music publishing executive.
- Damaris Hayman, 91, English actress (Doctor Who, Steptoe and Son, The Young Ones).
- B. Jaya, 76, Indian actress (Nyayave Devaru, Devaru Kotta Thangi, Sampathige Savaal).
- Sir Anerood Jugnauth, 91, Mauritian politician, prime minister (1982–1995, 2000–2003, 2014–2017) and president (2003–2012).
- Vladimir Kadannikov, 79, Russian businessman and politician, deputy prime minister (1996).
- Fernando Lima Bello, 89, Portuguese Olympic sailor (1968, 1972) and administrator.
- Ernie Lively, 74, American actor (The Sisterhood of the Traveling Pants, Fire Down Below, The Dukes of Hazzard), heart failure.
- Anne van der Meiden, 91, Dutch theologian, professor (Utrecht University) and translator.
- Alan Miller, 51, English footballer (Arsenal, Middlesbrough, West Bromwich Albion).
- James Norris, 91, American Olympic water polo player (1952).
- Ezio Motta, 90, Italian football referee (Serie A).
- G. N. Rangarajan, 90, Indian film director (Meendum Kokila, Ellam Inba Mayyam, Kadal Meengal).
- Murat Šaran, 71, Bosnian footballer (Sarajevo, Rijeka, Levante).
- Tim Tolman, 65, American baseball player (Houston Astros, Detroit Tigers), Parkinson's disease.
- Sheldon M. Wiederhorn, 88, American materials scientist.
- Yoshio Yatsu, 86, Japanese politician, member of the House of Representatives (1986–1990, 1992–2009) and minister of agriculture, forestry and fisheries (2000–2001).
- John Sacret Young, 75, American television writer and producer (China Beach, The West Wing, Firefly Lane), brain cancer.

=== 4 ===
- Jacques Amalric, 82, French journalist, editor-in-chief (Le Monde).
- Karla Burns, 66, American opera singer and actress (Show Boat), stroke.
- Rafael Castillejo, 68–69, Spanish researcher, cultural activist, and writer.
- Władysław Ciastoń, 96, Polish state official, general of MO, chief of SB and Deputy Interior Minister (1981–1987).
- Santiago Cid Harguindey, 76, Spanish politician, mayor of Verín (1983–1991).
- Douglas S. Cramer, 89, American television producer (Wonder Woman, Dynasty, The Love Boat) and art collector, heart and kidney failure.
- Roberto Depietri, 55, Argentine footballer (Club Olimpo, Deportivo Toluca), COVID-19.
- Roberto Derlin, 78, Italian football player (Genoa, Spezia Calcio) and manager (Sestri Levante).
- Loris Dominissini, 59, Italian football player (Udinese, Reggiana) and manager (Reggiana), COVID-19.
- David Dushman, 98, Danzig-born Russian Red Army soldier and fencing trainer.
- Richard R. Ernst, 87, Swiss physical chemist, Nobel Prize laureate (1991).
- Tom Fink, 92, American politician, member (1967–1975) and speaker (1973–1975) of the Alaska House of Representatives, mayor of Anchorage (1987–1994).
- Vilen Galstyan, 80, Armenian ballet dancer and actor (The Color of Pomegranates).
- Yosef Govrin, 90, Israeli diplomat, ambassador to Romania (1985–1989) and to Austria, Slovakia, and Slovenia (1993–1995).
- Tilly Hirst, 79, New Zealand netball player (national team), world champion (1967).
- Dumitru Ivanov, 75, Moldovan politician, deputy (2005–2009).
- Vadim Kapranov, 81, Russian basketball player (Soviet team, CSKA, Dynamo Moscow) and coach, Olympic bronze medalist (1968).
- Friederike Mayröcker, 96, Austrian poet.
- Barbara Mertens, 53, Belgian journalist and TV presenter (Bel RTL, RTL-TVI), cancer.
- John M. Patterson, 99, American politician, attorney general (1955–1959) and governor (1959–1963) of Alabama.
- Kalipatnam Ramarao, 96, Indian poet and writer.
- Fred Robinson, 90, American football player (Ottawa Rough Riders, Cleveland Browns, Toronto Argonauts).
- Nikolai Serdtsev, 73, Russian military officer, commander of the Russian Engineer Troops (1999–2008).
- Wolfgang Strödter, 73, German Olympic field hockey champion (1972).
- Clarence Williams III, 81, American actor (The Mod Squad, Purple Rain, The Butler), colon cancer.

=== 5 ===
- Lucette Aldous, 82, New Zealand-born Australian ballerina.
- Bikram Keshari Barma, 81, Indian politician, Odisha MLA (2004–2009), complications from COVID-19.
- Narinder Bragta, 68, Indian politician, Himachal Pradesh MLA (since 2017), complications from COVID-19.
- William F. Burns, 88, American major general.
- Jean-Claude Caron, 77, French actor (Navarro).
- John Clem Clarke, 83, American painter, complications from dementia.
- Philippe Courtot, 76, French-American entrepreneur, chairman and CEO of Qualys (since 2001).
- Fred Foldvary, 75, American economist.
- Grace Griffith, 64, American folk and Celtic singer, complications from Parkinson's disease.
- F. Gerald Ham, 91, American archivist.
- Maksim Ishkeldin, 30, Russian bandy player (Sibselmash, Zorky, SKA-Neftyanik), blood clot.
- S. B. John, 87, Pakistani singer.
- TB Joshua, 57, Nigerian televangelist, founder of Synagogue, Church of All Nations.
- Ann Russell Miller, 92, American socialite and nun.
- George Murphy, 58, Canadian politician, Newfoundland and Labrador MHA (2011–2015), heart attack.
- Nguyễn Thu Thủy, 44, Vietnamese beauty pageant winner, Miss Vietnam (1994), stroke.
- Irena Ondrová, 71, Czech politician, senator (1996–2002), mayor of Zlín (2006–2010).
- Atal Bihari Panda, 92, Indian actor (Sala Budha, Aadim Vichar), playwright, and lyricist, complications from COVID-19.
- Dina Recanati, 93, Israeli artist.
- Richard Robinson, 84, American businessman and educator, president and CEO of Scholastic Corporation (since 1975).
- Surekha, 66, Indian actress (Mulamoottil Adima, Chekkeranoru Chilla, Idhuthanda Sattam), heart attack.
- Pedro Taberner, 74, Spanish footballer (RCD Mallorca, Celta de Vigo).
- Paulo Thiago, 75, Brazilian film director (Sagarana: The Duel, The Long Haul), screenwriter and producer.
- William Joseph Whelan, 96, British-born American biochemist.
- Galen Young, 45, American basketball player (Charlotte 49ers, Yakima SunKings, Perth Wildcats), injuries sustained from car accident.

=== 6 ===
- Camilla Amado, 82, Brazilian actress (Cordel Encantado, Prime Time Soap).
- Ernest April, 81, American anatomist.
- Gwyn Arch, 90, British composer and choir director.
- Addo Bonetti, 95, American politician, member of the Connecticut House of Representatives (1967–1979).
- James B. Brennan, 95, American politician, member of the Wisconsin Senate (1959–1961), U.S. attorney of the Eastern District of Wisconsin (1961–1969).
- Paul Cahill, 65, English footballer (Portsmouth, California Surf).
- Edward J. Clancy Jr., 70, American politician.
- Lewis J. Clarke, 94, English-American landscape architect.
- Leonard Crow Dog, 78, American Lakota medicine man, liver cancer.
- Jovan I. Deretić, 82, Serbian publicist and writer.
- John Ernest Ekuban, 84, Ghanaian politician, MP (1993–1997).
- Murray Enkin, 97, Canadian physician and writer.
- Revaz Gabriadze, 84, Georgian screenwriter (Mimino, Kin-dza-dza!, Passport), writer and sculptor.
- Ted C. Gertsch, 87, American politician.
- Paokai Haokip, 80, Indian politician, MP (1967–1977), cancer.
- Aby Har Even, 84, Romanian-Israeli engineer, complications from arson injuries.
- Rolf Hellem, 97, Norwegian politician, MP (1965–1981).
- Jacques Behnan Hindo, 79, Turkish-born Syrian Syriac Catholic hierarch, archbishop of Al-Hasakah-Nisibis (1996–2019).
- Michel Host, 83, French writer, COVID-19.
- Ann Hraychuck, 69, American politician, member of the Wisconsin State Assembly (2007–2011), cancer.
- William L. Joyce, 79, American archivist and academic administrator, cancer.
- Kim Yun-sim, 98, North Korean admiral, commander of the Korean People's Navy (1997–2007).
- Mochtar Kusumaatmadja, 92, Indonesian diplomat, minister of justice (1974–1978) and foreign affairs (1978–1988).
- Philip McCracken, 92, American visual artist.
- Michele Merlo, 28, Italian singer-songwriter, complications from cerebral hemorrhage.
- Julio Miranda, 74, Argentine politician, governor of Tucumán Province (1999–2003), senator (1992–1999, 2003–2009), and president of Atlético Tucumán (1997–1999).
- Kiyoo Mogi, 91, Japanese seismologist, aspiration pneumonia.
- Rick Mohr, 61, American football player (Toronto Argonauts, Saskatchewan Roughriders), heart attack.
- Maciej Morawski, 91, Polish journalist (Radio Free Europe).
- Betty Mpeka, 67, Ugandan physician, COVID-19.
- Ei-ichi Negishi, 85, Japanese chemist (Negishi coupling), Nobel Prize winner (2010).
- Mansour Ojjeh, 68, French-Saudi Arabian entrepreneur.
- Guaçu Piteri, 86, Brazilian politician, mayor of Osasco (1967–1970, 1977–1982), São Paulo MLA (1971–1975), and deputy (1975–1977).
- Chanie Rosenberg, 99, South African-born British activist and artist. (death announced on this date)
- Sanyika Shakur, 57, American criminal, member of Crips and author (Monster: The Autobiography of an L.A. Gang Member).
- Carol Smith, 95, American contralto.
- Frances Stein, 83, American-French fashion designer, lung cancer.
- Gérard Vergnaud, 88, French mathematician and philosopher.
- Philip Wong, 82, Hong Kong politician, MLC (1991–2012), brain cancer.
- Vera Zelinskaya, 76, Russian film production designer (Of Freaks and Men), Russian Guild of Film Critics winner (1988).

=== 7 ===
- Abd Rahman Yusof, 64, Malaysian politician, MP (1999–2004), lung cancer.
- Vadim Cojocaru, 60, Moldovan politician, deputy (since 2009).
- Dixie Dansercoer, 58, Belgian explorer, endurance athlete and photographer, fall.
- Iluminado Davila Medina, 102, Puerto Rican musician.
- Guglielmo Epifani, 71, Italian trade unionist and politician, general secretary of CGIL (2002–2010) and deputy (since 2013), pulmonary embolism.
- Norma Evenson, 92, American historian.
- Jim Fassel, 71, American football coach (University of Utah, New York Giants) and player (The Hawaiians), heart attack.
- Larry Gelman, 90, American actor (The Bob Newhart Show, The Odd Couple, Maude), complications from a fall.
- Laszlo George, 90, Hungarian-born Canadian cinematographer (Running).
- Gertrud Herrbruck, 94, German Olympic swimmer (1952).
- Renato Iturrate, 99, Chilean Olympic cyclist (1948).
- Mikhail Karpeyev, 98, Russian military officer.
- Mumtaz Ali Khan, 94, Indian politician, Karnataka minister for minority affairs, haj, and wakf (2008–2013).
- David C. Lewis, American keyboardist (Ambrosia), brain cancer.
- Richard Longenecker, 91, American-Canadian scholar.
- John McDonnell, 82, Irish-born American athletics coach.
- Ali Akbar Mohtashamipur, 73, Iranian politician, MP (1990–1992, 2000–2004), minister of the interior (1985–1989), co-founder of Hezbollah, complications from COVID-19.
- Moon In-soo, 76, South Korean poet.
- Richard Nunns, 75, New Zealand traditional Māori instrumentalist.
- Pete Ohler, 80, Canadian football player (BC Lions, Winnipeg Blue Bombers), cancer.
- Risuke Otake, 95, Japanese martial artist.
- Ben Roberts, 70, British actor (The Bill, Jane Eyre, A Little Chaos), kidney failure.
- Martin Schechter, 90–91, American mathematician.
- Tom Stechschulte, 72, American actor (The Clairvoyant, What About Bob?, The Manchurian Candidate).
- Su Yiran, 102, Chinese revolutionary and politician, governor of Shandong (1979–1982), member of the Central Advisory Commission (1987–1992) and CCP Central Committee (1977–1987).
- Shaleen Surtie-Richards, 66, South African actress (Mama Jack, Fiela's Child, Egoli: Place of Gold).
- Fulvio Varglien, 85, Italian footballer (Triestina, Livorno, Pordenone).
- Dheeraj Verma, 53, Indian comic book artist, pulmonary fibrosis complicated by COVID-19.
- Yoo Sang-chul, 49, South Korean footballer (Ulsan Hyundai, Yokohama F. Marinos, national team), pancreatic cancer.
- John Zampieri, 80, American politician, member of the Vermont House of Representatives (1965–1985), heart failure.

=== 8 ===
- John Angus, 82, English footballer (Burnley, national team).
- Sylvain Ducange, 58, Haitian Roman Catholic prelate, auxiliary bishop of Port-au-Prince (since 2016), complications from COVID-19.
- Farhad Humayun, 42, Pakistani singer and drummer (Overload).
- Karen MacLeod, 63, British Olympic long-distance runner (1996).
- Joseph Margolis, 97, American philosopher.
- Édith Moskovic, 89, French Holocaust survivor and activist.
- Dean Parrish, 79, American soul singer.
- Desanka Pešut, 79, Serbian Olympic sport shooter (1976).
- Tim Pickup, 72, Australian rugby league player (Canterbury-Bankstown, St Helens, national team), complications from dementia.
- Dave Reid, 87, Canadian ice hockey player (Toronto Maple Leafs).
- Ivy Ruckman, 90, American author (Night of the Twisters).
- K. Sornam, 88, Indian journalist and film director (Ulagam Sutrum Valiban, Thangathile Vairam).
- Gennadi Syomin, 53, Russian football player (FShM Torpedo Moscow, Fakel Voronezh) and manager (Dynamo Voronezh).
- Ilpo Tiihonen, 70, Finnish writer.
- C. M. Udasi, 84, Indian politician, four-time Karnataka MLA.
- Kamla Verma, 93, Indian politician, Haryana MLA (1977–2000), mucormycosis.

=== 9 ===
- Rabi Banerjee, 70, Indian cricketer (Bengal), complications from COVID-19.
- Jan Bieleman, 72, Dutch historian.
- Gottfried Böhm, 101, German architect (Maria, Königin des Friedens) and sculptor, Pritzker Prize winner (1986).
- Edward de Bono, 88, Maltese philosopher (lateral thinking) and author (Six Thinking Hats, The Mechanism of Mind).
- Saul B. Cohen, 95, American human geographer.
- Dale Danks, 81, American politician, mayor of Jackson, Mississippi (1977–1989), complications from a stroke.
- Claude Dufau, 75, French rugby union player and manager.
- Jon Hameister-Ries, 37, Canadian football player (BC Lions).
- Cynthia Hargrave, 64, American film producer (Bottle Rocket, Perfume).
- Helmud Hontong, 58, Indonesian politician, vice regent of the Sangihe Islands (since 2017), heart attack.
- Abdul Latif Ibrahimi, 62, Afghan politician, governor of Kunduz (2002–2004), Faryab (2004–2005), and Takhar (2009–2010, 2013–2015), COVID-19.
- Robert Katzmann, 68, American jurist, judge (since 1999) and chief judge (2013–2020) for the U.S. Court of Appeals for the Second Circuit, pancreatic cancer.
- Buddhika Kurukularatne, 77, Sri Lankan politician, MP (1989–1994).
- Kirkland Laing, 66, Jamaican-born British boxer, European welterweight champion (1990), British welterweight champion (1979–1980, 1987–1991).
- Dick Manley, 89, English rugby union player.
- Steve Mrkusic, 92, New Zealand architect.
- Diogo Correa de Oliveira, 38, Brazilian footballer (Flamengo, Kalmar, Hokkaido Consadole Sapporo), traffic collision.
- Alejandro Orfila, 96, Argentine diplomat and winemaker, secretary general of the Organization of American States (1975–1984).
- Robert W. Porter, 94, American neurosurgeon.
- Libuše Šafránková, 68, Czech actress (The Salt Prince, Tři oříšky pro Popelku, Kolya).
- Valentina Sidorova, 67, Russian fencer, Olympic champion (1976) and silver medalist (1980).
- Dakota Skye, 27, American pornographic film actress, acute multidrug intoxication.

=== 10 ===
- James E. Alderman, 84, American jurist, justice of the Supreme Court of Florida (1978–1985).
- Alexander, 68, Azerbaijani Russian Orthodox prelate, archbishop of Baku and Azerbaijan (since 1999), COVID-19.
- Douglas Cagas, 77, Filipino politician, member of the House of Representatives (1998–2007), governor of Davao del Sur (2007–2013, since 2016), COVID-19.
- Buddhadeb Dasgupta, 77, Indian film director (Bagh Bahadur, Tahader Katha, Uttara) and poet, kidney disease.
- Hélène Diarra, 65–66, Malian actress (Bamako, Guimba the Tyrant, Moolaadé).
- Peter C. Fishburn, 84, American mathematician.
- Henry Ford, 89, American football player (Cleveland Browns, Pittsburgh Steelers).
- Elizabeth French, 90, English archaeologist.
- Getatchew Haile, 90, Ethiopian-American philologist.
- Willem Konjore, 75, Namibian politician, member (1989–2010) and deputy speaker (2000–2005) of the National Assembly.
- Bob Leaf, 89, American public relations executive, cancer.
- Douglas Ley, 62, American academic and politician, member of the New Hampshire House of Representatives (since 2012).
- Frank Lobman, 67, Surinamese-Dutch kickboxer.
- Ray MacDonnell, 93, American actor (All My Children).
- Joyce MacKenzie, 95, American actress (Tarzan and the She-Devil).
- Mickey Muennig, 86, American architect.
- Neno, 59, Portuguese footballer (Vitória de Guimarães, Benfica, national team), heart attack.
- Duncan Pegg, 40, Australian politician, Queensland MP (since 2015), cancer.
- Sir Dai Rees, 85, British biochemist, chief executive of the Medical Research Council (1987–1996).
- Haico Scharn, 75, Dutch Olympic middle-distance runner (1972).
- Dingko Singh, 42, Indian Olympic boxer (2000), complications from liver cancer.
- Larisa Shoygu, 68, Russian politician, deputy (since 2007), complications from COVID-19.
- Gheorghe Staicu, 85, Romanian football player (Steaua București) and manager (Olimpia Satu Mare, Universitatea Cluj).
- Enzo Tonti, 85, Italian physicist and mathematician.
- John Wingard, 93, American politician, member of the Minnesota House of Representatives (1963–1972).

=== 11 ===
- Aziza Baccouche, 48, American physicist, brain tumour.
- Ivo Baldi Gaburri, 74, Italian-born Peruvian Roman Catholic prelate, bishop of Huaraz (1999–2004) and Huarí (since 2004), COVID-19.
- Heribert Beissel, 88, German conductor.
- Valentín de la Cruz, 92–93, Spanish monk and historian, member of the Real Academia de Bellas Artes de San Fernando.
- Husin Din, 68, Malaysian politician, Perak MLA (2008–2018).
- Art Ditmar, 92, American baseball player (New York Yankees, Philadelphia / Kansas City Athletics), World Series champion (1958).
- Walter Michael Ebejer, 91, Maltese-born Brazilian Roman Catholic prelate, bishop of União da Vitória (1976–2007).
- Geoffrey Edelsten, 78, Australian medical entrepreneur.
- Jerald Ericksen, 96, American mathematician.
- John Gabriel, 90, American actor (Ryan's Hope, Stagecoach, The Mary Tyler Moore Show), complications from Alzheimer's disease.
- Mudcat Grant, 85, American baseball player (Cleveland Indians, Minnesota Twins, Oakland Athletics).
- Don Gaston, 86, American businessman, chairman of the Boston Celtics (1983-1993).
- Haji Gora Haji, 88, Tanzanian poet.
- Hash Halper, 41, American street artist, suicide by jumping.
- Sando Harris, 58, Sri Lankan actor (Seethala Gini Kandu, A Common Man, Singa Machan Charlie) and stunt director.
- Kay Hawtrey, 94, Canadian actress (Funeral Home, Max & Ruby, Trapped in Paradise).
- Hessley Hempstead, 49, American football player (Detroit Lions), heart attack.
- Leroy Jones, 70, American football player (Edmonton Eskimos, San Diego Chargers).
- Taha Karaan, 52, South African Islamic scholar, complications from COVID-19.
- Dame Georgina Kirby, 85, New Zealand Māori leader and women's advocate.
- John Leffler, 81, Australian racing driver.
- Jon Lukas, 72, Maltese musician.
- Surat Mathur, 90, Indian Olympic long-distance runner (1952).
- Bernardo Mercado, 69, Colombian boxer, cardiac arrest.
- Vern Miller, 92, American politician, attorney general of Kansas (1971–1975).
- David Naugle, 68–69, American religious philosopher and author.
- Ashok Panagariya, 71, Indian neurologist and medical researcher, complications from COVID-19.
- Lewis Pickles, 88, English cricketer (Somerset).
- Paola Pigni, 75, Italian middle-distance runner, Olympic bronze medallist (1972), heart attack.
- Lucinda Riley, 55, Northern Irish author and actress (Auf Wiedersehen, Pet), oesophageal cancer.
- Ron Sang, 82, Fijian-born New Zealand architect and art collector.
- Howard Sattler, 76, Australian radio host, progressive supranuclear palsy.
- Siddalingaiah, 67, Indian poet, COVID-19.
- Karel Štogl, 48, Czech lawyer, bureaucrat and diplomat.
- Andrzej Szczytko, 65, Polish actor and stage director.
- Pearl Tang, 99, Chinese-born American obstetrician and gynecologist.
- Bob Tata, 91, American politician, member of the Virginia House of Delegates (1984–2014).
- Quarto Trabacchini, 71, Italian politician, deputy (1987–1994).
- Sara Wedlund, 45, Swedish Olympic long-distance runner (1996).
- Zhang Zuoji, 76, Chinese politician, minister of labour and social security (1998–2003), governor of Heilongjiang (2003–2007) and MP (2008–2018).

=== 12 ===
- Jack Adams, 34, English rugby union player (Gloucester, Moseley, Bristol), cancer.
- M. Flint Beal, 70, American neurologist.
- Dennis Berry, 76, American-French film director (The Big Delirium, Chloé, Highlander: The Raven).
- Anatoly Chukanov, 67, Russian racing cyclist, Olympic champion (1976).
- James Cohn, 93, American composer.
- Larry Giles, 73, American historical preservationist, leukemia.
- Chad Hundeby, 50, American long-distance swimmer, heart attack.
- Piyong Temjen Jamir, 87, Indian literary scholar.
- Witold Kieżun, 99, Polish economist and Warsaw Uprising insurgent.
- Marco Maciel, 80, Brazilian politician and academic, president of the Chamber of Deputies (1977–1979), minister of education (1985–1986), and vice president (1995–2002), COVID-19.
- John Marinatto, 63, American college athletics commissioner, commissioner of the Big East Conference (2009–2012).
- Jesús Martín-Barbero, 83, Spanish-born Colombian communication scientist.
- John Millman, 90, American-born Canadian-English Olympic cyclist (1952).
- Robert Edgcumbe, 8th Earl of Mount Edgcumbe, 82, New Zealand-British peer, member of the House of Lords (1982–1999).
- Fazlullah Mujadedi, 64, Afghan politician, governor of Logar (2001–2002) and Takhar (2017–2019), COVID-19. (death announced on this date)
- Richard Samson Odingo, 86, Kenyan environmental scientist.
- Ash Riser, 31, American musician and music producer.
- Slavko Špan, 83, Slovene Olympic steeplechaser (1964).
- William L. Swing, 86, American diplomat.
- Nergüin Tümennast, 54, Mongolian Olympic wrestler (1992).
- Gert Watzke, 98, Austrian Olympic rower (1948).
- Igor Zhelezovski, 57, Belarusian speed skater, Olympic silver (1994) and bronze medalist (1988), COVID-19.

=== 13 ===
- Ned Beatty, 83, American actor (Network, Deliverance, Superman).
- Hans Breuer, 90, German politician, mayor of Augsburg (1972–1990).
- JJ Brine, 38, American visual artist.
- Ken Burgess, 76, British-Israeli musician.
- Georges Cadoudal, 91, French sonneur.
- Siegfried Jost Casper, 92, German biologist.
- Hryhorii Chapkis, 91, Ukrainian dancer and choreographer, complications from COVID-19.
- Krystyna Chojnowska-Liskiewicz, 84, Polish naval engineer and sailor.
- Raul de Souza, 86, Brazilian trombonist (Sérgio Mendes, Baden Powell, Milton Nascimento), throat cancer.
- Sven Erlander, 87, Swedish mathematician.
- Ashley Henley, 40, American politician, member of the Mississippi House of Representatives (2016–2020), shot.
- Toeti Heraty, 87, Indonesian poet.
- Indira Hridayesh, 80, Indian politician, Uttarakhand MLA (2002–2007, since 2012), heart attack.
- Viktor Ivankov, 96, Russian military officer.
- Carol Jarecki, 86, American chess organizer.
- Maurice Joncas, 84, Canadian writer.
- Sir John Kemball, 82, British air marshal, deputy commander of RAF Strike Command (1989–1993).
- Deona Knajdek, 31, American activist, traffic collision.
- David Lightfoot, 61, Australian film producer (Wolf Creek), heart attack.
- Nikita Mandryka, 80, French comics artist (L'Écho des savanes, Pilote).
- Nirmal Saini, 82, Indian volleyball player (national team), COVID-19.
- Su Dongshui, 89, Chinese economist.
- Margarita Vorobyova-Desyatovskaya, 88, Russian Orientalist and academic.
- John J. Wise, 89, American chemical engineer.
- Saadi Youssef, 87, Iraqi poet and author, complications from lung cancer.
- Ziona, 75, Indian sect leader and polygamist.

=== 14 ===
- Jock Aird, 94, Scottish footballer (Burnley, national team).
- Paul Alexander, 83, American illustrator.
- Lisa Banes, 65, American actress (Cocktail, Young Guns, Gone Girl), traffic collision.
- Gunnar Birgisson, 73, Icelandic politician, MP (1999–2006).
- Enrique Bolaños, 93, Nicaraguan politician, president (2002–2007) and vice president (1997–2000).
- Livio Caputo, 87, Italian politician and journalist, senator (1994–1996), director of Il Giornale (since 2021).
- Chen Shijun, 23, Chinese student, stabbed.
- Manuel Clavero, 95, Spanish politician, assistant minister of the regions (1977–1979) and minister of culture (1979–1980).
- Sir Eion Edgar, 76, New Zealand businessman and philanthropist, chancellor of the University of Otago (1999–2003), pancreatic cancer.
- Sir Ian Hassall, 79, New Zealand paediatrician, commissioner for children (1989–1994).
- Schang Hutter, 86, Swiss sculptor.
- Robert D. Keppel, 76, American police officer (HITS database, investigations of Ted Bundy and Gary Ridgway).
- Mburumba Kerina, 89, Namibian politician and academic, deputy speaker of the Constituent Assembly (1989) and coiner of country's name, COVID-19.
- Markis Kido, 36, Indonesian badminton player, Olympic (2008) and world champion (2007, 2010), heart attack.
- Chris Kirubi, 80, Kenyan industrialist, cancer.
- Jean-Baptiste Libouban, 86, French syndicalist (Community of the Ark).
- Washington Jakoyo Midiwo, 54, Kenyan politician, MP (2007–2017), heart attack.
- Tuono Pettinato, 44, Italian comics writer and illustrator.
- Horst Rittner, 90, German chess grandmaster.
- Moira Roth, 87, British art historian.
- Dinah Shearing, 95, Australian actress (Farscape, Family and Friends, E Street).
- Edmund Sieminski, 88, American politician, member of the Pennsylvania House of Representatives (1979–1982).
- Adam Smelczyński, 90, Polish trap shooter, Olympic silver medalist (1956).
- Selçuk Tekay, 68, Turkish composer, heart attack.
- Facinet Touré, 87, Guinean politician, soldier and coup leader, minister of foreign affairs (1984–1985) and co-founder of the CMRN.
- Ivan Vertelko, 94, Russian military officer.
- Wang Chiu-Hwa, 95, Taiwanese architect, heart failure.
- Qazi Amin Waqad, 73–74, Afghan politician, leader of Hezb-e Islami Gulbuddin, minister of communications (1994–1997).
- Robert C. Witcher, 94, American bishop.

=== 15 ===
- Aleksandr Averyanov, 72, Russian football player (Lokomotiv Moscow) and manager (Okean Nakhodka, Dynamo Saint Petersburg).
- Sheldon Bach, 96, American psychologist.
- Warren Barker, 92, Canadian journalist.
- Hridayeshwar Singh Bhati, 18, Indian chess variant inventor, cardiac arrest.
- Raúl Cicero, 94, Mexican Olympic fencer.
- Walt Criner, 84, American football and basketball coach, melanoma.
- Yves Dassonville, 73, French civil servant and statistician, high commissioner of New Caledonia (2007–2010).
- Thomas B. Day, 89, American scientist, president of San Diego State University (1978–1996).
- Silvio De Florentiis, 86, Italian Olympic long-distance runner (1960).
- Robert Desroches, 91, Canadian actor (Terre humaine, Duplessis, There's Always a Way to Find a Way).
- Allistar Fredericks, 49, South African Olympic field hockey player (1996).
- Pavel Galkin, 98, Russian military pilot.
- Howie Glover, 86, Canadian ice hockey player (Detroit Red Wings).
- M. A. Hannan, 86, Bangladeshi politician, MP (2014–2018), cancer.
- Wendell H. Hanson, 101, American politician, member of the South Dakota Senate (1977–1978, 1981–1982).
- Allan Kiil, 57, Estonian swimmer.
- Paul Alois Lakra, 65, Indian Roman Catholic prelate, bishop of Gumla (since 2006).
- Nikolai Lukashevich, 80, Russian military officer.
- Benon Magezi, 60, Ugandan Anglican prelate, bishop of North Kigezi (since 2017), COVID-19.
- Jim Phelan, 92, American college basketball coach (Mount St. Mary's Mountaineers).
- Ron Saul, 73, American football player (Houston Oilers, Washington Redskins).
- Jackie Shako Diala Anahengo, 62, Congolese actress.
- Vladimir Shatalov, 93, Russian cosmonaut (Soyuz 4, Soyuz 8, Soyuz 10), twice Hero of the Soviet Union.
- Thaika Shuaib, 90, Indian Islamic scholar.
- James Skosana, 59, South African politician, member of the National Assembly (2009–2018).
- Vince Steckler, 62, American businessman, CEO of Avast, traffic collision.
- Tim Thorney, 66, Canadian guitarist, songwriter, and record producer.
- William vanden Heuvel, 91, American attorney and author.
- Anna C. Verna, 90, American politician, member (1975–2012) and president (1999–2011) of the Philadelphia City Council.
- Sanchari Vijay, 37, Indian actor (Harivu, Naanu Avanalla...Avalu, Killing Veerappan), traffic collision.
- Gustavo Villapalos, 71, Spanish academic and politician, rector of Complutense University of Madrid (1987–1995).
- Lily Weiding, 96, Danish actress (Lady with the Light Gloves, Be Dear to Me, Martha).
- Jack B. Weinstein, 99, American jurist, judge (since 1967) and chief judge (1980–1988) of the U.S. District Court for the Eastern New York.

=== 16 ===
- Edward Baldwin, 4th Earl Baldwin of Bewdley, 83, British hereditary peer, member of the House of Lords (1977–2018).
- Byrd Baylor, 97, American author.
- Renate Blank, 79, German politician, MP (1990–2009).
- Frank Bonner, 79, American actor (WKRP in Cincinnati, Just the Ten of Us) and television director (City Guys), complications from Lewy body dementia.
- Michael Champion, 74, American singer and actor (Beverly Hills Cop, Total Recall, Pink Cadillac).
- Chandrashekhar, 98, Indian actor (Surang, Cha Cha Cha, Ramayan).
- Chou Ching-chun, 77, Taiwanese social activist and politician, president of the Patriot Alliance Association (since 2018), COVID-19.
- Bill Dotson, 80, American middle-distance runner, cancer.
- Laila Hirvisaari, 83, Finnish author.
- Huang Xiling, 94, Chinese geotechnical specialist, member of the Chinese Academy of Engineering.
- A. Santha Kumar, 52, Indian playwright and screenwriter, complications from leukaemia and COVID-19.
- Jabu Mabuza, 63, South African utilities executive, chairman of Eskom (since 2018), COVID-19.
- Janet Malcolm, 86, Czech-born American journalist (The New Yorker, Psychoanalysis: The Impossible Profession, The Journalist and the Murderer), lung cancer.
- Allen Midgette, 82, American actor (La commare secca, Before the Revolution, Lonesome Cowboys).
- Mogens Møller, 86, Danish minimalist artist.
- J. Peter Neary, 71, Irish economist.
- Karnail Singh Nijhar, 85, Malaysian politician, MP (1999–2008).
- John Osmers, 86, New Zealand anti-apartheid activist and Anglican cleric, bishop of East Zambia (1995–2002), complications from COVID-19.
- Joel Otim, 49, Ugandan Olympic sprinter (1992), COVID-19.
- Bhekiziziwe Peterson, 60, South African writer and academic.
- Maya K. Peterson, 41, American historian and author (Pipe Dreams: Water and Empire in Central Asia's Aral Sea Basin), complications during childbirth.
- Norman Powell, 86, American television producer (24) and executive, acute respiratory failure.
- Cyril Ranatunga, 91, Sri Lankan military officer.
- Swatilekha Sengupta, 71, Indian actress (Ghare Baire, Bela Seshe), kidney disease.
- Dwight Siebler, 83, American professional baseball player (Minnesota Twins).
- Richard Stolley, 92, American journalist and editor (People), heart disease.
- Boris Tarasov, 89, Russian military officer and politician, member of the Supreme Soviet (1990–1993).
- Vance Trimble, 107, American journalist (The Kentucky Post), Pulitzer Prize winner (1960).
- Rómulo Yanes, 62, Cuban-born American photographer (Gourmet), peritoneal cancer.
- Novica Zdravković, 73, Serbian folk musician, prostate cancer.

=== 17 ===
- Halvard Bjørkvik, 96, Norwegian historian.
- Ulrich Bremi, 91, Swiss politician, member (1986–1989) and president (1990–1991) of the National Council.
- Mike Burgess, 89, Canadian-born English footballer (AFC Bournemouth) & (Euro 2020).
- Kamil Ferkhanov, 56, Russian footballer (Regar-TadAZ Tursunzoda, Euro 2020, Turbostroitel Kaluga, Volga Ulyanovsk), heart attack.
- Fane Flaws, 70, New Zealand musician, songwriter, and artist (Blerta, The Crocodiles, The Spats).
- Billy Fuccillo, 65, American car dealer.
- Alex Harvill, 28, American motorcycle stuntman, crash during practice.
- Neil Hollander, 81, American journalist and filmmaker (First Flights with Neil Armstrong).
- Kenneth Kaunda, 97, Zambian politician, president (1964–1991), prime minister of Northern Rhodesia (1964) and chairperson of the NAM (1970–1973), pneumonia.
- Robert Lima, 48, Uruguayan football player (Peñarol, Chacarita) and manager (Juticalpa), cardiac arrest.
- Mary Frances McDonald, 91–92, Irish feminist.
- Shaman Mithru, 43, Indian actor (Thorati) and cinematographer (Huchudugaru), COVID-19.
- Clive Murphy, 85, British author and social historian.
- John Mutwa, 60, Namibian military officer.
- Tubilandu Ndimbi, 73, Congolese footballer (AS Vita Club, national team).
- Teddy Parker, 83, German singer.
- Eric Pike, 84, South African Anglican prelate, bishop of Port Elizabeth (1993–2001).
- Deniz Poyraz, 38, Turkish political operative, shot.
- Juha Siira, 75, Finnish Olympic sailor (1976, 1980).
- B. Vijayakrishna, 71, Indian cricketer (Karnataka).
- Xu Yuanchong, 100, Chinese literary translator.
- Giacomo Zani, 89, Italian conductor and musicologist, traffic collision.

=== 18 ===
- Lamia Abbas Amara, 92, Iraqi poet.
- Jeannette Altwegg, 90, Indian-born English figure skater, Olympic champion (1952).
- Giampiero Boniperti, 92, Italian footballer (Juventus, national team) and politician, MEP (1994–1999), heart failure.
- Boris Borovsky, 82, Russian tennis player and sports journalist.
- Djillali Ben Brahim, 68, Algerian Olympic judoka.
- Ron Buxton, 72, American politician, member of the Pennsylvania House of Representatives (1993–2012), lung disease.
- John Bertrand Conlan, 90, American politician, member of the Arizona Senate (1965–1973) and U.S. House of Representatives (1973–1977).
- Gérard Fromanger, 81, French artist.
- Gift of Gab, 50, American rapper (Blackalicious, Quannum Projects).
- Joralf Gjerstad, 95, Norwegian faith healer.
- Sir Ronald Halstead, 94, British businessman, heart failure.
- Eric Lindsay, 91, English actor and
- Ian MacGillivray, 100, Scottish doctor.
- John Martyr, 89, Australian politician, member of the House of Representatives (1975–1980) and Senate (1981–1983).
- Regina Minudri, 84, American librarian.
- Edward Mortimer, 77, British civil servant, journalist and academic, cancer.
- Rodrigo Munilla, 44, Argentine sports journalist, COVID-19.
- S. Ramesan Nair, 73, Indian poet and lyricist, COVID-19.
- Andrés Ortiz-Osés, 78, Spanish philosopher.
- S. R. Ramaiah, 102, Indian politician, Karnataka MLA (1957–1962).
- Hélène Ramjiawan, 69, Surinamese children's book author.
- Emma Roca Rodríguez, 47, Spanish ski mountaineer, vulvar cancer.
- Vekuii Rukoro, 66, Namibian lawyer, politician and traditional leader, MP (1989–2000), attorney general (1995–2000), and chief of the Herero people (since 2014), COVID-19.
- Milkha Singh, 91, Indian Olympic sprinter (1956, 1960, 1964) and writer (The Race of My Life), COVID-19.
- Takeshi Terauchi, 82, Japanese rock guitarist and actor (Ereki no Wakadaishō), pneumonia.
- Hans Toch, 91, Austrian-born American social psychologist.
- Joan Ullyot, 80, American physician and marathon runner.
- Andrew Welsh, 77, Scottish politician, MP (1974–1979, 1987–2001), MSP (1999–2011).

=== 19 ===
- Dhiraj Bora, 69, Indian physicist.
- Freimut Börngen, 90, German astronomer.
- Champ, 12, American dog, presidential pet (since 2021).
- Ove Emanuelsson, 80, Swedish Olympic sprint canoer (1960, 1964, 1968).
- Isaac Fola-Alade, 87, Nigerian architect (1004 Estate).
- Armin Franulic, 77, Bolivian rally driver.
- Gary George, 77, American politician.
- Winfried Gottschalk, 77, German racing cyclist.
- Leon Greene, 89, English actor (A Challenge for Robin Hood, Flash Gordon, The Return of the Musketeers) and opera singer.
- Éric Guglielmi, 51, French photographer and photojournalist.
- Richard C. Howe, 97, American politician, member of the Utah House of Representatives (1951–1959, 1969–1973) and Senate (1973–1979), chief justice of the Utah Supreme Court (1998–2002).
- Carel Knoppers, 91, Dutch politician, mayor of Abcoude (1963–1974) and Ommen (1974–1990).
- Colin Loader, 90, New Zealand rugby union player (Wellington, national team).
- Juan Alberto Merlos, 76, Argentine Olympic cyclist (1964, 1968).
- Tapu Mishra, 36, Indian Ollywood playback singer (Mate Ta Love Helare, Dream Girl, Love Dot Com), complications from COVID-19.
- Roger Mpanano, 58, Congolese politician, member of the National Assembly (2007–2018).
- Jayanta Naskar, 73, Indian politician, West Bengal MLA (since 2011), COVID-19.
- Arnold Odermatt, 96, Swiss police photographer.
- Philousports, 49, French internet personality, heart attack.
- Alaa al-Siddiq, 33, Emirati human rights activist, traffic collision.
- Lennox Stewart, 71, Trinidadian Olympic middle-distance runner (1972).
- Boryana Straubel, 38, Bulgarian business executive (Tesla, Wikimedia Foundation), traffic collision.
- Stanislav Tomáš, 46, Czech Romani citizen, drug overdose.
- Glenn Watkins, 94, American musicologist.
- Spencer Whelan, 49, English footballer (Chester City, Shrewsbury Town).

=== 20 ===
- Frank Albrechtsen, 89, New Zealand footballer.
- Mike Bailey, 71, Australian television presenter (ABC, Seven News), stroke.
- Harry Cameron, 73, Australian rugby league player (Eastern Suburbs, Queensland).
- Thomas Cleary, 72, American author and translator.
- Marianne Debouzy, 91, French historian.
- Isla Dewar, 74, Scottish novelist and screenwriter (Women Talking Dirty), heart attack.
- Gordon Dunne, 62, Northern Irish politician, MLA (2011–2021).
- David Edwards, 56, Welsh musician (Datblygu) and writer.
- Bernette Ford, 70, American author, cancer.
- Juan Forn, 61, Argentine writer and translator.
- Alex Hesegem, 63, Indonesian politician, vice governor of Papua (2006–2011), complications from diabetes, pneumonia and COVID-19.
- James Iahuat, 62, Vanuatuan Olympic boxer.
- Daniel Ivin, 89, Croatian writer, politician and human rights activist, co-founder of the Croatian Social Liberal Party.
- Jeanne Lamon, 71, American-Canadian violinist and conductor.
- Lionel Leroy, 65, French singer.
- Joanne Linville, 93, American actress (A Star Is Born, Scorpio, James Dean).
- Anatoly Lysenko, 84, Russian television personality, journalist and producer.
- Irene Mambilima, 69, Zambian jurist, chief justice (since 2015) and deputy chief justice (2008–2015) of the Supreme Court.
- Mark Peel, 66, American chef (Campanile), cancer.
- Lucas Pereira, 39, Brazilian footballer (AC Ajaccio), COVID-19.
- Peter Rock, 79, German footballer, Olympic bronze medalist (1964).
- Gianna Rolandi, 68, American operatic soprano.
- Herbert Schnoor, 94, German politician and lawyer, minister of the interior of North Rhine-Westphalia (1980–1995).
- Neville Sillitoe, 96, Australian athletics coach.
- Luis del Sol, 86, Spanish footballer (Real Madrid, Juventus, national team) and coach.
- Ike Stubblefield, 69, American organist, cancer.
- Herbert Titus, 83, American lawyer and politician.
- Bernard Van Der Linde, 75, Dutch-born French cyclist, leukaemia.
- Anne Warner, 77, American politician, member of the New Hampshire House of Representatives (2018–2020).
- Laura Yasán, 60, Argentine poet, suicide.

=== 21 ===
- Amarasigamani, 70, Indian poet and actor (Raman Abdullah, Julie Ganapathi, Rendu).
- Jack Bertolini, 87, Scottish footballer (Workington, Brighton & Hove Albion, Stirling Albion).
- Gabriele Boscetto, 76, Italian politician and lawyer, senator (2001–2006, 2008–2013), president of the Province of Imperia (1995–2001).
- Oleg Burlakov, 71, Russian businessman and inventor, COVID-19.
- Diego Cortez, 74, American art curator, kidney failure.
- Nina Divíšková, 84, Czech actress (Morgiana, Shameless).
- Mark Doumit, 59, American politician, member of the Washington House of Representatives (1997–2002) and Senate (2002–2006), heart attack.
- Jean Guéguinou, 79, French diplomat, ambassador to the United Kingdom (1993–1998), Czechoslovakia (1990–1993) and the Holy See (1993–1998).
- Nobuo Hara, 94, Japanese jazz saxophonist, pneumonia.
- Haribhushan, Indian politician and guerrilla, COVID-19.
- Masatomi Ikeda, 81, Japanese aikidoka.
- Grant Jones, 82, American landscape architect and poet.
- Usman Kakar, 60, Pakistani politician, senator (2015–2021), brain hemorrhage.
- Mamady Keïta, 70, Guinean drummer.
- Tom Kurvers, 58, American ice hockey player (New York Islanders, Montreal Canadiens, New Jersey Devils), Stanley Cup champion (1986), lung cancer.
- Tiit Madisson, 71, Estonian activist, writer and politician, mayor of Lihula (2002–2005).
- Harry Prosen, 90, American psychiatrist.
- Reshma, 42, Indian actress (Ennai Thalatta Varuvala, Kizhakku Mugam, Vadagupatti Maapillai), complications from COVID-19.
- Tamanofuji Shigeru, 71, Japanese sumo wrestler, liver cancer.
- Hatiro Shimomoto, 85, Brazilian politician, São Paulo MLA (1971–1999), COVID-19 and diabetes.
- Jeffrey Steele, 89, British abstract painter.
- Richard S. Stein, 95, American scientist.
- Tuufuli Uperesa, 73, American football player (Winnipeg Blue Bombers, Ottawa Rough Riders, Philadelphia Eagles), kidney failure.

=== 22 ===
- Mohiuddin Ahmed, 77, Bangladeshi publisher.
- Patrick Allen, 59, American football player (Houston Oilers).
- Giancarlo Amadeo, 87, Italian football player (Pro Patria) and manager (Borgosesia).
- Jim Bessman, 68, American music journalist (Billboard).
- Winsford Devine, 77, Trinidadian songwriter.
- Hans Drewanz, 91, German conductor.
- Yaroslav Dumanskyi, 61, Ukrainian footballer (Spartak Ivano-Frankivsk, Karpaty Lviv, Dynamo Kyiv).
- Donald Gemmell, 89, New Zealand Olympic rower (1956).
- Patricia Reilly Giff, 86, American author (Lily's Crossing, Pictures of Hollis Woods).
- Robert Goetsch, 87, American politician.
- Horacio González, 77, Argentine teacher and essayist, director of the National Library of the Argentine Republic (2005–2015, since 2019), COVID-19.
- James F. Jones Jr., 87, American politician.
- Poovachal Khader, 72, Indian lyricist (Chuzhi, Criminals, Utsavam), complications from COVID-19.
- Mzilikazi Khumalo, 89, South African composer.
- Masatake Kuranishi, 96, Japanese mathematician (Cartan–Kuranishi prolongation theorem).
- Richard H. Kyle, 84, American jurist, justice of the U.S. District Court for Minnesota (since 1992).
- Hugh Lowther, 8th Earl of Lonsdale, 72, British aristocrat.
- Pandukht Manukyan, 70, Armenian politician, governor of Vayots Dzor Province (1997–2003), deputy (1995–1999).
- Hamid Mojtahedi, 79, Iranian film director (Iran Documentary), liver cancer.
- Chloe Munro, Australian public servant.
- Giulia Niccolai, 86, Italian poet and translator.
- Zbigniew Pełczyński, 95, Polish-British political philosopher and academic.
- Parassala B. Ponnammal, 96, Indian Carnatic musician.
- Reisen Ri, 79, Japanese actress and theater director, pneumonia.
- René Robert, 72, Canadian ice hockey player (Buffalo Sabres, Toronto Maple Leafs, Colorado Rockies), heart attack.
- Antonio Salines, 84, Italian actor (Monella, The Gamecock, Senso '45) and director.
- Vitaliy Shalychev, 74, Ukrainian football player (Shakhtar Donetsk, Kolhozchi Aşgabat) and coach (FC Ocean Kerch).
- Sergei Shaposhnikov, 98, Russian football player (Ska-Khabarovsk) and manager (CSKA Moscow, SKA Odesa).
- Philip Spagnuolo Jr., 53, American politician.
- Gordana Suša, 75, Serbian journalist (Blic).
- Tsevi E. Tal, 94, Polish-born Israeli judge, justice of the Supreme Court (1994–1997).
- Per Inge Torkelsen, 68, Norwegian comedian, complications from surgery.
- Leopoldo Torres, 80, Spanish jurist and politician, deputy (1979–1989) and attorney general (1990–1991).
- Jean-Pierre Vallat, 69, French historian and archeologist.
- Ad van 't Veer, 80, Dutch music director and music group founder (Xenakis Ensemble).
- Derek Fuller Wrigley, 97, English-born Australian architect.

=== 23 ===
- Paul Auerbach, 70, American physician and author, brain tumor.
- Viktor Balashov, 96, Russian radio and television presenter.
- Johannes Baumgartner, 93, Swiss Olympic runner (1952).
- Mike Brooks, 66, American journalist (CNN).
- Kulasiri Budawatta, 71, Sri Lankan dancer and choreographer.
- Bill Byrne, 80, American football player (Philadelphia Eagles).
- Cassandra Go, 25, Irish Thoroughbred racehorse.
- Melissa Coates, 50, Canadian professional wrestler (DSW, NWWL), bodybuilder and actress (Extreme Dodgeball), complications from COVID-19.
- Eldon Danenhauer, 85, American football player (Denver Broncos).
- Diana de Feo, 84, Italian journalist and politician, senator (2008–2013).
- Wojciech Karolak, 82, Polish musician.
- Priscilla Kavita, 59, Namibian politician.
- Jackie Lane, 79, British actress (Doctor Who, Compact).
- Alan Lewis, 75, British music journalist and editor.
- Tomáš Lom, 96, Czech World War II veteran.
- Brian London, 87, English heavyweight boxer, British and Commonwealth champion (1958–1959).
- John McAfee, 75, British-American computer programmer and businessman (McAfee Associates), suicide by hanging.
- Ellen McIlwaine, 75, American-born Canadian guitarist and blues singer, cancer.
- Mike McLachlan, 75, American politician, member of the Colorado House of Representatives (2013–2015).
- Morton Myles, 92, American fashion designer.
- Beryl Penrose, 90, Australian tennis player.
- Clare Peploe, 79, British-Italian film director (High Season, Triumph of Love) and screenwriter (Zabriskie Point).
- Viktor Potapov, 87, Russian military aviator, commander of Soviet Naval Aviation (1988–1991) and Russian Naval Aviation (1991–1994).
- Raymond, 32, Burmese singer-songwriter, cerebral malaria.
- Jean-Pierre Renevier, 92, Swiss Olympic sailor (1964).
- Med Reventberg, 73, Swedish actress (Ronia, the Robber's Daughter).
- Ramón Romero Roa, 55, Paraguayan lawyer and politician, deputy (since 2013), COVID-19.
- Pentti Saarman, 79, Finnish Olympic boxer (1972).
- Robert Sacchi, 89, Italian-born American actor (The Man with Bogart's Face, Casa d'appuntamento, Funland).
- Barbara Sargeant, 81, Australian Olympic swimmer (1956).
- Bev Scalze, 77, American politician, member of the Minnesota House of Representatives (2005–2013) and Senate (2013–2017), cancer.
- Arturo Schwarz, 97, Italian art historian, poet, and writer.
- Martine Segalen, 80, French ethnologist.
- Yuriy Sevenard, 85, Russian politician, deputy (1991–1999), COVID-19.
- Shalala, 61, Filipino television host (Juicy!, Hey It's Saberdey!, Good Morning Club) and comedian, cardiac arrest.
- Vyacheslav Shverikas, 60, Russian politician, senator (2004–2017).
- René Sylvestre, 58, Haitian jurist and lawyer, president of the Supreme Court (since 2019), COVID-19.
- Ngarikutuke Tjiriange, 77, Namibian politician, member of the Constituent Assembly (1989–1990) and National Assembly (1990–2010), minister of justice (1990–2003).
- Bart Van Lancker, 48, Belgian football coach (KV Kortrijk, Sint-Truiden, OH Leuven), cancer.
- Daniel Vélez, 47, Colombian footballer (DIM, Atlético Bucaramanga, Santa Fe), COVID-19.
- Mila Ximénez, 69, Spanish journalist, writer, and television personality, lung cancer.
- Darius Young, 83, American Olympic shooter (1988, 1992).
- Peter Zinovieff, 88, British engineer (EMS VCS 3) and composer.

=== 24 ===
- Benigno Aquino III, 61, Filipino politician, president (2010–2016), senator (2007–2010) and member of the House of Representatives (1998–2007), diabetic nephropathy.
- Francis X. Archibald, 89, American politician, member of the South Carolina House of Representatives (1981–1986).
- Brian Baker, 47, American politician, member of the Missouri House of Representatives (2002–2008), complications from COVID-19.
- Nizar Banat, 42, Palestinian human rights activist.
- Mohamed Boucha, 54–55, Nigerien politician, minister of employment, labor and social protection (2020–2021).
- Sonny Callahan, 88, American politician, member of the U.S. House of Representatives (1985–2003), Alabama Senate (1979–1985) and House of Representatives (1971–1979).
- Misheck Chidzambwa, 66, Zimbabwean football player (Dynamos, national team) and manager (Chapungu United).
- Stephen Dunn, 82, American poet, Pulitzer Prize winner (2001), complications from Parkinson's disease.
- Tom Flaws, 89, New Zealand cricketer (Otago).
- Neil Hirsch, 74, American businessman, founder of Telerate.
- Richard Hoffmann, 96, American composer and musicologist.
- Paul B. Huber, 86, American-Canadian economist.
- Frederick S. Humphries, 85, American educator, president of Florida A&M University (1985–2001).
- David Lee Hunter, 87, American mathematician.
- Alain Paul Lebeaupin, 76, French Roman Catholic prelate, apostolic nuncio to the European Union (2012–2020), heart attack.
- Dick Leonard, 90, British writer, journalist and politician, MP (1970–1974).
- Paul Mea, 81, I-Kiribati Roman Catholic prelate, bishop of Tarawa and Nauru (1978–2020).
- Juliette Minces, 83, French sociologist.
- Olga Moiseeva, 92, Russian ballerina and teacher.
- Ludwig Müller, 79, German footballer (1. FC Nürnberg, Hertha, West Germany national team).
- Zedekia Ngavirue, 88, Namibian diplomat.
- Isabel Pallarès, 57, Spanish teacher and trade unionist.
- Thomas G. Plaskett, 77, American business executive.
- Bachir Qamari, 70, Moroccan literary critic.
- Alain Richard, 95, French monk.
- Keith Rutter, 89, English footballer (Queens Park Rangers, Colchester United).
- Edna Schmidt, 51, Puerto Rican journalist.
- Sivan, 89, Indian photographer, cinematographer and film director (Yagam, Abhayam).
- Eleazar Soria, 73, Peruvian footballer (Universitario, Independiente, national team) and lawyer.
- Ronald I. Spiers, 95, American diplomat, Ambassador to the Bahamas (1973–1974), Turkey (1977–1980) and Pakistan (1981–1983).
- Trần Thiện Khiêm, 95, Vietnamese military officer and politician, prime minister of South Vietnam (1969–1975).
- Don Worland, 89, Australian footballer (Geelong).
- LaMetta Wynn, 87, American politician, mayor of Clinton, Iowa (1995–2007), complications from Alzheimer's disease.
- Petr Zuman, 95, Czech chemist.

=== 25 ===
- Brian Bamford, 85, English professional golfer.
- Olga Barnet, 69, Russian actress (Solaris, The Flight of Mr. McKinley, Takeoff).
- Oliva Blanchette, 92, American philosopher.
- Serge Buttet, 66, French Olympic swimmer (1976).
- Luis Cáceres Velásquez, 90, Peruvian politician, mayor of Juliaca (1964–1970, 1975, 1981–1983) and Arequipa (1987–1992), congressman (2000–2001).
- Harry deLeyer, 93, Dutch-born American equestrian.
- Juergen B. Donges, 80, German economist.
- John Erman, 85, American television director (My Favorite Martian, Peyton Place, That Girl), Emmy winner (1983).
- Marcos Ferrufino, 58, Bolivian football player (Club Bolívar, national team) and manager (San José), COVID-19.
- Justine Héroux, 78-79, Canadian film and television producer (The Crime of Ovide Plouffe).
- June Kenney, 87, American actress.
- José Nino Gavazzo, 81, Uruguayan military officer and convicted criminal.
- Antonio Helguera, 55, Mexican cartoonist (La Jornada).
- Jack Ingram, 84, American Hall of Fame racing driver, NASCAR Busch Grand National Series champion (1982, 1985).
- Raymond Masono, Bougainvillean politician, vice-president (2017–2020).
- Jack Melick, 91, American bandleader and pianist.
- Benjamin Moore, 69, American studio glass artist.
- Rinaldo Rafanelli, 71, Argentine singer (Sui Generis, Color Humano).
- Yuri Raizer, 94, Russian theoretical physicist.
- Umberto Riva, 93, Italian architect, designer and academic.
- Chandrama Santha, 83, Indian politician, MLA.
- Kostas Sarantidis, 94, Greek-Vietnamese guerrilla fighter.
- Ahmed Bilal Shah, 67, Pakistani-Zimbabwean physician and television presenter, COVID-19.
- John Sigley, 89, New Zealand cricketer (Wellington).
- Andy Wells, 75–77, Canadian politician, mayor of St. John's (1997–2008).
- Peter Willis, 54, British journalist and newspaper editor (Sunday Mirror, The Sunday People).
- Wes, 57, Cameroonian singer ("Alane"), complications from surgery.

=== 26 ===
- Antoine Bailly, 76, Swiss geographer, recipient of the Vautrin Lud Prize (2011).
- Joseph Behar, 94, American television director (From These Roots, Days of Our Lives, General Hospital).
- José Paulo Bisol, 92, Brazilian politician, deputy (1983–1987) and senator (1987–1995), multiple organ failure.
- Arnold H. Buss, 96, American psychologist.
- Marcelo Campo, 63, Argentine rugby union player (Club Pueyrredón, national team), heart attack.
- Sow-Hsin Chen, 86, Taiwanese physicist.
- Edward Crowther, 92, British-born South African-American Anglican prelate, bishop of Kimberley and Kuruman (1965–1967).
- Dennis Good, 94, English cricketer (Worcestershire, Glamorgan).
- Dave Gorsuch, 82, American Olympic alpine skier (1960).
- Mike Gravel, 91, American politician, senator (1969–1981), member (1963–1967) and speaker (1965–1967) of the Alaska House of Representatives, myeloma.
- Abdalelah Haroun, 24, Sudanese-born Qatari Olympic sprinter (2016), Asian Games 400m champion (2018), world junior 400m champion (2016), traffic collision.
- Jon Hassell, 84, American trumpeter and composer.
- Paula Jacobs, 88–89, English actress (Albion Market, An American Werewolf in London, The Remains of the Day).
- S. Kameswaran, 98, Indian surgeon.
- Mir Hazar Khan Khoso, 91, Pakistani jurist and politician, chief justice of the Federal Shariat Court (1992–1994) and caretaker prime minister (2013), cardiac arrest.
- John Langley, 78, American television producer (Cops), heart attack.
- José Antonio Morales Ehrlich, 85, Salvadoran politician, mayor of San Salvador (1974–1976, 1987–1988).
- Lebogang More, 41, South African politician, Gauteng MPL (since 2013).
- Joyce Mulliken, 75, American politician, cancer.
- Josip Osti, 75, Bosnian-born Slovenian poet and translator.
- Jhon Mario Ramírez, 49, Colombian football player (Boyacá Chicó, national team) and manager (Patriotas), COVID-19.
- Frederic Rzewski, 83, American composer (The People United Will Never Be Defeated!) and pianist, heart attack.
- Johnny Solinger, 55, American singer-songwriter (Skid Row), liver failure.
- David Yale, 93, British legal historian.

=== 27 ===
- Donald Arnold, 85, Canadian rower, Olympic champion (1956), heart failure.
- Silvano Bertini, 81, Italian boxer, Olympic bronze medallist (1964).
- Big Jake, 20, American Belgian gelding, tallest living horse (since 2010). (death announced on this date)
- Francis Bretherton, 85, English-born American applied mathematician.
- Reuven Bulka, 77, Canadian rabbi, leader of Machzikei Hadas (since 1967), liver and pancreatic cancer.
- Lellia Cracco Ruggini, 89, Italian historian.
- Jean-Claude Dionne, 86, Canadian geographer and professor.
- Jack G. Downing, 80, American CIA field officer, colon cancer.
- Jevgeņijs Drobots, 74, Latvian politician, member of the Supreme Council (1990–1993).
- Kolbein Falkeid, 87, Norwegian poet.
- Noel Furlong, 83, Irish poker player and carpet distributor.
- Erwin Carl Gangl, 83, American electrical engineer, fellow of the Institute of Electrical and Electronics Engineers.
- Gao Shangquan, 92, Chinese economist.
- Alison Greenspan, 48, American film and television producer (Monte Carlo, The Best of Me, For Life), cancer.
- Steven Horwitz, 57, American economist.
- Jiang Jingshan, 85, Chinese aerospace engineer, member of the Chinese Academy of Sciences.
- José Luis Liso, 86, Spanish politician, mayor of Soria (1979–1987) and senator (1986–2000).
- Jean Macdonald, 101, Scottish archaeologist and museum curator.
- Lambert Mascarenhas, 106, Indian journalist (The Navhind Times, Goa Today) and independence activist.
- Dominick Montiglio, 73, American mob associate (Gambino crime family).
- Andrew Moody, 60, British journalist (China Daily, The Washington Post, The Wall Street Journal), amyotrophic lateral sclerosis.
- Hiroaki Nakanishi, 75, Japanese electronics executive, president (2010–2014) and chairman (since 2014) of Hitachi, lymphoma.
- Kenneth Ogba, 54, Nigerian politician, Delta State MHA (since 2019).
- Peps Persson, 74, Swedish musician, heart failure.
- Khursheed Shahid, 95, Pakistani actress, cardiac arrest.
- Greg Sizer, 55, Australian footballer (Melbourne).
- Bill Weigand, 92, Canadian politician, mayor of Whitehorse (1991–1994).
- Ian White, 76, British politician, MEP (1989–1999).

=== 28 ===
- Lázaro Barbosa de Sousa, 32, Brazilian murderer and kidnapper, shot.
- Lauren Berlant, 63, American scholar and writer, cancer.
- Ivan Bordi, 83, Romanian Olympic water polo player (1956).
- Maurice Buffière, 87, French Olympic basketball player (1956).
- Thomas C. Ferguson, 87, American diplomat.
- Burton Greene, 84, American jazz pianist.
- Harry Johnston, 89, American politician, member of the U.S. House of Representatives (1989–1997), member (1974–1986) and president (1984–1986) of the Florida Senate.
- Richard H. Jefferson, 90, American politician, member of the Minnesota House of Representatives (1987–1999).
- Liliane Kerjan, 81, French author.
- Jeannot Mwenze Kongolo, 61, Congolese politician, minister of interior affairs (1997–1998).
- Paul Koulak, 78, French composer.
- Vera Nikolić, 72, Serbian Olympic middle-distance runner (1968, 1972).
- Greg Noll, 84, American surfer.
- Fernand Ouellet, 94, Canadian author.
- Sergio Víctor Palma, 65, Argentine boxer, WBA super bantamweight champion (1980–1982), complications from COVID-19.
- Menelik Shabazz, 67, Barbadian-born British film director (Burning an Illusion), producer and educator, complications from diabetes.
- John C. H. Spence, 75, Australian-born American physicist.
- Joe Winston, 77, Irish Gaelic footballer (St Eunan's, Donegal).

=== 29 ===
- Dalenda Abdou, 92, Tunisian actress (El Icha), COVID-19.
- William S. Anderson, 102, British-American businessman, president of NCR (1972–1984).
- Rita Asfour, 88, American painter.
- Fintan Aylward, 93, Canadian jurist and politician, Newfoundland and Labrador MHA (1972–1975).
- Evgeni Bakardzhiev, 66, Bulgarian politician, MP (1997–2005).
- Gordon Brooks, 81, Barbadian cricket photographer (national team) and sports journalist.
- Theodore Cohen, 93, American exhibition designer.
- Ronnie Cramer, 64, American film producer and director.
- Stuart Damon, 84, American actor (General Hospital, The Champions, Port Charles), kidney failure.
- Abu Deraa, Iraqi militant, shot.
- Maxime Ferrari, 91, Seychellois politician, minister of labor (1975–1978), planning and development (1978–1982), and planning and external relations (1982–1984).
- Émile-José Fettweis, 93, Belgian architect.
- Delia Fiallo, 96, Cuban author and screenwriter (Lucecita, Estrellita mía, Cristal).
- Ramlan Hutahaean, 65, Indonesian Lutheran priest.
- Carolyn Tanner Irish, 81, American Anglican prelate, bishop of Utah (1996–2010).
- Xavier Lacroix, 74, French philosopher and theologian.
- John Lawton, 74, English hard rock singer (Uriah Heep, Lucifer's Friend).
- Petros Leventakos, 75, Greek footballer (Panachaiki, Ethnikos Piraeus, PAS Giannina).
- Norman Lowe, 93, Canadian ice hockey player (New York Rangers).
- Elizabeth Martínez, 95, American Chicana feminist.
- Vicky Peretz, 68, Israeli football player (Maccabi Tel Aviv, national team) and manager (Hakoah Amidar Ramat Gan).
- Goolam Rajah, 74, South African cricket administrator and manager (national team), COVID-19.
- Scott Reid, 74, American baseball player (Philadelphia Phillies) and scout (Detroit Tigers).
- Dame Jane Roberts, 71, British librarian and curator, royal librarian (2002–2013).
- Donald Rumsfeld, 88, American politician, secretary of defense (1975–1977, 2001–2006) and member of the U.S. House of Representatives (1963–1969), multiple myeloma.
- Onsi Sawiris, 91, Egyptian businessman, founder of Orascom Construction.
- Carlos Vilar, 91, Argentine sailor, world champion (1948, 1951), COVID-19 and heart disease.
- César Virguetti, 66, Bolivian politician and academic, deputy (since 2020), COVID-19.
- Chris Volpe, 40, American musician.
- Robert Wykes, 95, American classical composer and flautist.
- Xue Yuqun, 89, Chinese hydrogeologist, member of the Chinese Academy of Sciences.

=== 30 ===
- Bonfoh Abass, 72, Togolese politician, member (1999–2013) and president (2005–2013) of the National Assembly, acting president (2005).
- Silvia Alessandri, 94, Chilean politician, deputy (1969–1973).
- Bart Bartholomew, 85, American Olympic weightlifter (1968).
- Skippy Blair, 97, American ballroom dancer.
- Jean Botham, 86, British Olympic swimmer (1952).
- Vic Briggs, 76, English blues and rock guitarist (Steampacket, Eric Burdon and the Animals), cancer.
- Ruth Budd, 97, Canadian bassist.
- Inge Danielsson, 80, Swedish footballer (Helsingborg, Ajax, national team).
- Richard Dolley, 61, South African cricket player (Eastern Province) and administrator, COVID-19.
- Antoinette Duclaire, 33, Haitian feminist and political activist, shot.
- Joel Edwards, 70, Jamaican-born British writer and broadcaster, general director of the Evangelical Alliance, cancer.
- Jimmy Fitzmorris, 99, American politician, lieutenant governor of Louisiana (1972–1980).
- Abdur Razzaq Iskander, 85, Pakistani Islamic scholar, chancellor of Jamia Uloom-ul-Islamia (since 1997), emir of AMTKN (since 2015) and president of Wifaq ul Madaris (since 2017).
- Daniel Jarvis, 85, Canadian politician.
- Ryūichi Kaneko, 72, Japanese photography historian and critic.
- Raj Kaushal, 49, Indian film director (Anthony Kaun Hai?, Shaadi Ka Laddoo, Pyaar Mein Kabhi Kabhi) and producer, heart attack.
- K. V. Sampath Kumar, 64, Indian newspaper editor (Sudharma), heart attack.
- Janet Moreau, 93, American track and field athlete, Olympic champion (1952).
- Rafael Moreno Rojas, 84, Chilean politician, senator (1972–1973, 1998–2006).
- Barbara Murphy, 56, Irish nephrologist, glioblastoma.
- Paul Musso, 89, French Olympic sports shooter (1968).
- Bob Newland, 72, American football player (New Orleans Saints).
- Yasunori Oshima, 70, Japanese baseball player (Chunichi Dragons, Nippon Ham Fighters), colorectal cancer.
- The Patriot, 59, American professional wrestler (AWA, AJPW, WWF), heart attack.
- John L. Pearson, 95, American politician, member of the Mississippi House of Representatives (1966–1980).
- Arthur M. Poskanzer, 90, American experimental physicist.
- Dick Railsback, 75, American pole vaulter.
- Wayne Reid, 83, Australian tennis player.
- Märt Ringmaa, 83, Estonian serial bomber, stroke.
- Martha Seger, 89, American economist.
- William St Clair, 83, British historian.
- Sharad Tripathi, 49, Indian politician, MP (2014–2019).
- Alain Viala, 73, English literary scientist.
- Tim Webster, 71, American football player (Green Bay Packers).
