= Varglien =

Varglien is a surname. Notable people with the surname include:

- Fulvio Varglien (1936–2021), Italian footballer and coach
- Giovanni Varglien (1911–1990), Italian footballer and manager
- Mario Varglien (1905–1978), Italian footballer and manager, brother of Giovanni
