= Drys =

Drys may refer to:

== Places ==
- Drys (Thrace) (Δρῦς), an ancient city in Thrace
- Drys (Δρῦς), one of the names of the ancient city of Rouphinianai in Bithynia
- Drys (Δρῦς), an ancient city at Epirus which hasn't been discovered yet

== Other ==
- Georgios Drys (Γεώργιος Δρυς), a Greek politician
- DRYS, DryShips Inc.
