= Silvio Francesconi =

Italian footballer and manager (1952–2021)

Personal information
- Date of birth: 23 October 1952
- Place of birth: Montignoso, Italy
- Date of death: 1 June 2021 (aged 68)
- Place of death: Massa, Italy
- Height: 1.73 m (5 ft 8 in)
- Position: Midfielder

Senior career*
Years	Team	Apps	(Gls)
1971–1973	Massese		
1976–1977	Carpi		
1977–1979	Carrarese		
1979	Ternana		
1979–1980	Udinese	3	(0)
1980–1981	Ternana		
1981–1983	Sanremese		

Managerial career
- 1990–1991: SSD Castelfiorentino
- * Club domestic league appearances and goals

Silvio Francesconi (23 October 1952 – 1 June 2021) was an Italian football player and manager. He played as a midfielder for, among others, A.S.D. Sarzanese Calcio 1906, Ternana Calcio and S.S.D. Sanremese Calcio.

Francesconi died on 1 June 2021, aged 68, from COVID-19.
