= Martine Segalen =

French ethnologist (1940–2021)

- Born: Martine Tony Appel; 20 July 1940
- Died: 23 June 2021 (aged 80)
- Occupation: Ethnologist

Martine Segalen (20 July 1940 – 23 June 2021) was a French ethnologist. A specialist on family matters and European culture, she was a professor for multiple universities.

== Biography ==
Segalen began working as a professor in the sociology department at Paris Nanterre University in 1996. She would go on to direct the sociology department and the Diplôme d’études supérieures spécialisées program. She had graduated from Sciences Po in 1960, in addition to her doctorate in ethnology in 1984. From 1971 to 1996, she was a researcher at the French National Centre for Scientific Research and was Director of the Centre d'ethnologie française from 1986 to 1996. In 2015, she became a member of the Société d'ethnologie française.

Martine Segalen died on 23 June 2021 at the age of 80.

== Works ==
- Nuptialité et alliance. Le choix du conjoint dans une commune de l'Eure (1972)
- Les confréries dans la France contemporaine : les Charités (1975)
- Le cycle de la vie familiale dans les sociétés européennes (1977)
- Mari et femme dans la société paysanne (1980)
- Amours et mariages de l’ancienne France (1981)
- Sociologie de la famille (1981)
- Quinze générations de bas bretons : parenté et société dans le pays bigouden sud (1720-1980) (1985)
- Ethnologie de la France (1986)
- L'Autre et le semblable. Regards sur l'ethnologie des sociétés contemporaines (1989)
- Nanterriens : les familles dans la ville, une ethnologie de l’identité (1990)
- Jeux de familles (1991)
- Chez Soi : objets et décors, des créations familiales ? (1993)
- Les Cadets (1994)
- Les enfants d'Achille et de Nike, Une ethnologie de la course à pied ordinaire (1994)
- La famille en Europe. Parenté et perpétuations familiales en Europe (1995)
- Rites et rituels contemporains (1998)
- Grands-parents, La famille à travers les générations (1998)
- Ethnologie. Concepts et aires culturelles (2001)
- Siècle des grands-parents : une génération phare ici et ailleurs (2001)
- Le nouvel esprit de famille (2002)
- Éloge du mariage, collection « Découvertes Gallimard » (nº 434) (2003)
