= Rodrigo Munilla =

Argentine sports journalist (1976–2021)

- Born: Rodrigo Munilla; 9 October 1976; Buenos Aires, Argentina
- Died: 18 June 2021 (aged 44); Buenos Aires, Argentina

Rodrigo Munilla (9 October 1976 − 18 June 2021) was an Argentine sports journalist who mainly worked in radio.

== Career ==
He rose to prominence in his career working along with well-known sports journalist Víctor Hugo Morales in Radio Continental and was the radio's credited journalist for the Argentine Football Association (AFA). His last work was for a football show on cable network C5N.

== Illness and Death ==
Munilla contracted COVID-19 in March 2021, during the COVID-19 pandemic in Argentina, and was hospitalized that month until his death from the disease on 18 June 2021.
