= Eric Lindsay =

English actor & magician (1929–2021)

Eric Lindsay (13 November 1929 – 18 June 2021) was an English actor and magician.

Lindsay was born under another name, which he refused to divulge. His father was a tailor and taxidriver, and his mother was a court dressmaker.

In his early acting career he appeared as Renfield alongside Bela Lugosi in a theatre production of Dracula.

His partner was actor Ray Jackson. Lindsay having saved £100 from Dracula, together they opened an espresso bar in Soho, "Heaven & Hell", next door to The 2i's Coffee Bar; and the Regency coffee bar in East Sheen. In 1958 they opened a cabaret club called the Casino de Paris, at 5–7 Denman Street by Piccadilly Circus. The lease expired in 1977, and Lindsay reinvented himself as a magician, "Zee".

As Zee, Lindsay supported Ken Dodd, and toured America, drawing comparisons to David Copperfield and Doug Henning. During the 1980s he lived in Spain. Jackson died in October 1989.

As part of his magic act, he owned an Indian leopard, Scorpio. This eventually attacked him in 1991, and he retired to Thailand. He made one last performance in 2001 in Dubai. In 2018 he moved into the London Charterhouse, where he was baptised and confirmed.
