= Carel Knoppers =

Dutch politician (1930–2021)

Mayor of Abcoude
- In office 1963–1974
- Preceded by: Louis Albert Quarles van Ufford
- Succeeded by: Hans van Welsenis

Mayor of Ommen
- In office 1974–1990
- Preceded by: Cornelis Pieter van Reeuwijk
- Succeeded by: Reinier ter Avest

Personal details
- Born: Hendrik Carel Knoppers; 9 April 1930 Oudenrijn, Netherlands
- Died: 19 June 2021 (aged 91) Ommen, Netherlands
- Party: CHU; CDA

Hendrik Carel Knoppers (9 April 1930 – 19 June 2021) was a Dutch politician. A member of the Christian Historical Union (CHU) and the Christian Democratic Appeal (CDA), he served as Mayor of Abcoude from 1963 to 1974 and Mayor of Ommen from 1974 to 1990.

== Biography ==
Knoppers studied law at Leiden University, where he earned his master's degree in 1957. From 1957 to 1963, he worked in the Provincial Planning Service of North Brabant.

He was Mayor of Abcoude from 1963 to 1974 and Mayor of Ommen from 1974 to 1990. After he retired, he continued to live in his residence in Ommen. He was made an honorary citizen of both cities.

Carel Knoppers died in Ommen on 19 June 2021 at the age of 91.
