= Bhekiziziwe Peterson =

South African writer (1961–2021)

- Born: 7 April 1961; Johannesburg, South Africa
- Died: 15 June 2021 (aged 60)
- Occupations: film writer and producer

Bhekizizwe Peterson (7 April 1961 – 15 June 2021) was a prominent African intellectual born in Alexandra Township in Johannesburg, South Africa. Until his passing, he was a Professor of African Literature at University of the Witwatersrand. Peterson was also an internationally renowned film writer and producer. He co-founded Natives at Large, a black owned and controlled South African full service Film & Television production company. He co - founded Natives at Large with film-maker Ramadan Suleman.

== Career ==
Peterson started his academic career as a Junior Lecturer at University of the Witwatersrand in 1988, and progressed through the ranks to Full Professor (2012 - 2021). Peterson formerly served as Head of the African Literature Department twice. He held degrees from University of the Witwatersrand (BA and PhD), University of York (MA).

== Politics and education ==
Peterson was a leading practitioner of working class theatre. He was known for being a generous mentor to young black South Africans. His prolific academic research was informed by an unyielding interest in the value of marginalised forms of cultural knowledge in South Africa and the larger African world. It spanned areas such as youth culture, popular music forms, the visual arts, Black intellectual history, and autobiography. More recently he served as co-leader of an international research group called Narrative Enquiry for Social Transformation (NEST). Besides his contributions to literary scholarship, Peterson, also used film as a medium for critical engagement with the social and political life of his homeland, South Africa.

== Personal life ==
Peterson died on 16 June 2021 at the age of 60 from COVID-19. He was survived by his wife Pat, and two children, Neo and Khanyi.

== Selected publications ==
=== Single authored ===
Monarchs, Missionaries and African Intellectuals: African Theatre and the Unmaking of Colonial Marginality (Wits University Press/Africa World Press, 2000)

=== Co-authored ===
Fragments in the Sun: Poems and Performance Text, with Benjy Francis and Essop Patel (Afrika Cultural Centre, 1985)

The Creative Act: A Notebook on Community Playmaking, with Benjy Francis (Afrika Cultural Centre, 1990)

Zulu Love Letter, with Ramadan Suleman (Wits University Press, 2000)

Sol Plaatje's Native Life in South Africa: Past and Present, with Janet Remmington and Brian Willan (Wits University Press, 2016)

=== Journal Special Issues ===
Es'kia Mphahlele: Teacher and Mentor, special issue of English in Africa, 32 (2) August 2011 (co-edited with Anette Horn)

Texts, Modes and Repertoires of Living in and beyond Shadows of Apartheid, special issue of Journal of African Literature Association, 10 (1), 2016

Narrative Articulations in Africa, special issue of Social Dynamics, 45 (3), 2019 (co-edited with Jill Bradbury)

== Creative works ==
=== Films ===
- Fools (1997, writer, producer)
- Zulu Love Letter (2004, writer, associate producer)
- Rights of Passage (2015, producer)
- The Innovation of Loneliness (2017, producer)

=== Documentaries ===
- Born into Struggle (2004, producer)
- Zwelidumile (2010, writer, producer)
- The Battle for Johannesburg (2010, writer, producer)
- Miners Shot Down (2014, consulting producer)
- By any means necessary (2019, writer, producer)
