= John Ernest Ekuban =

Ghanaian politician (1937–2021)

Hon. John Ernest Ekuban

Member of the Ghana Parliament for Cape Coast
- In office 7 January 1993 – 6 January 1997

Personal details
- Born: 23 February 1937 Cape Coast, Gold Coast (now Ghana)
- Died: 17 April 2021 (aged 84) Accra, Ghana
- Party: National Democratic Congress
- Education: University of Cape Coast
- Occupation: Teacher

John Ernest Ekuban (23 February 1937 – 17 April 2021) was a Ghanaian politician and a member of the First Parliament of the Fourth Republic representing the Cape Coast Constituency in the Central region of Ghana.

== Early life and education ==
Ekuban was born on 23 February 1937 at Cape Coast in the Central region of Ghana. He attended the University of Cape Coast and obtained his Bachelor of Arts.

== Politics ==
He was first elected into Parliament on the ticket of the National democratic Congress for the Cape Coast Constituency in the Central Region of Ghana. He was defeated by S. Valis-Akyianu during the Parliamentary Primaries. Valis was defeated by Christine Churcher of the New Patriotic Party during the 1996 Ghanaian General Elections.

== Personal life ==
He was a Christian.

== Career ==
He was a teacher and a member of Parliament for the Cape Coast constituency in the Central region of Ghana.
