= M. Flint Beal =

American neurologist and academic (1950-2021)

Dr. M. Flint Beal
- Born: Myron Flint Beal; November 6, 1950; New York
- Died: June 12, 2021 (aged 70)

Myron Flint Beal, better known as M. Flint Beal, (born November 6, 1950, died on June 12, 2021) was an American neurologist, neuroscientist, and academic who was known for his work on neurodegenerative diseases. He was a former chair of the Department of Neurology and Neuroscience at Weill Cornell Medicine, and neurologist-in-chief at NewYork-Presbyterian and the Weill Cornell Medical Center. He was an editor at Neurology Alert.
