= Marcel Czermak =

French psychiatrist and psychoanalyst (1941–2021)

- Born: 4 October 1941
- Died: 3 June 2021 (aged 79)
- Occupations: Psychiatrist; Psychoanalyst

Marcel Czermak (4 October 1941 – 3 June 2021) was a French psychiatrist and psychoanalyst. He is well known for his outspoken stance against the proliferation of the so-called scientific discourse and for his significant contributions to the study of the psychoses.

== Biography ==
For many years, Czermak was director of the Centre psychiatrique d’orientation et d’accueil at the Sainte-Anne Hospital Center. He often participated in the presentations of Jacques Lacan. He was a founding member of the Association freudienne, which became the Association lacanienne internationale. He was also the founder of the École psychanalytique de Sainte-Anne and wrote numerous books and studies. He served as co-editor-in-chief of the Journal français de psychiatrie. In 1987, he published an article in Le Monde diplomatique contesting "the general reference to science whose 'discourse' seems to be authoritative for all", particularly for politicians.

Marcel Czermak died on 3 June 2021 at the age of 79.

== Publications ==
- Passions de l'objet : études psychanalytiques des psychoses (1986)
- Patronymies : considérations cliniques sur les psychoses (1998)
- Faut-il juger et punir les malades mentaux criminels? (2000)
- Délire des négations (2001)
- Les jardins de l'asile (2008)
- La navigation astronomique (2011)
- Chemins traversiers II (2015)
- Passage à l'acte et acting out (2019)
