= Jean Macdonald =

Scottish archaeologist and museum curator (1920–2021)

Jean Macdonald FSA
- Born: 6 March 1920; Pancras, London
- Died: 27 June 2021 (aged 101); Pinner, London, England

Academic work
- Discipline: Archaeology
- Institutions: London Museum; Museum of London

Jean Katherine Macdonald FSA (1920 – 27 June 2021) was a Scottish archaeologist and museum curator. She was a prehistorian, specialising in the prehistory of London.

== Biography ==
Macdonald was part of the team formed by W. F. Grimes to recreate the London Museum after World War II at Kensington Palace. She initially worked as Grimes' secretary but undertook study at Birkbeck College to gain a degree in archaeology, where she met her life long friend, Sylvia Wilson, an historian with whom she travelled through Europe. Jean was very much considered a part of the Sylvia Wilson family of 4 children. Jean was the godmother to Morwenna Wilson. She specialised in prehistory and, when the London Museum and Guildhall Museum amalgamated in 1975 into the Museum of London, Macdonald designed the first prehistoric gallery.

Macdonald was elected as a fellow of the Society of Antiquaries of London in May 1978. She retired from the museum of London in 1985. Following retirement, she served as Honorary Secretary of the London and Middlesex Archaeological Society from 1986 to 1990. She regularly attended services at the Crown Court Church.

== Select publications ==
- Collins, D., Macdonald, J., Barratt, J., Canham, R. A., Merrifield, R. and Hurst, J. G. (1976). The archaeology of the London area: current knowledge and problems.
- Macdonald, J. (1978). "An Iron Age dagger in the Royal Ontario Museum". In: Collectanea Londiniensia: studies in London archaeology and history presented to Ralph Merrifield. pp. 44–52.
