= Odero Gon =

Italian footballer (1933–2021)

Personal information
- Date of birth: 15 April 1933
- Place of birth: Palmanova, Italy
- Date of death: 2 June 2021 (aged 88)
- Place of death: Palmanova, Italy
- Positions: Defender; midfielder

Senior career*
Years	Team	Apps	(Gls)
1953–1954	Palmanova		
1954–1960	Udinese		
1961–1962	Vittorio Falmec		
1962–1963	Udinese		
1963–1970	Palmanova		
- * Club domestic league appearances and goals

Odero Gon (15 April 1933 – 2 June 2021) was an Italian footballer who played as a defender or midfielder for A.C. Palmanova, Udinese Calcio, and A.S.D. Vittorio Falmec San Martino Colle.

Gon died on 2 June 2021, aged 88.
