= Alain Richard (monk) =

French Franciscan monk (1924–2021)

- Born: 4 October 1924; France
- Died: 24 June 2021 (aged 95)
- Occupation: Franciscan monk

Alain Richard (4 October 1924 – 24 June 2021) was a French Franciscan monk. He was a part of Peace Brigades International and founded so-called "Cercles de silence" ("Circles of silence").

== Biography ==
Richard graduated from university with a degree in agricultural engineering. He entered the Franciscan novitiate in 1947 and took his vows in 1953. He then served as a vicar in Orsay and was chaplain of Paris-Sud University until 1967.

In 1973, Richard began living in the United States. He participated in his first Peace Brigades International in 1983 and subsequently the Pace e Bene in 1989. He returned to France in 1998 and joined the Franciscan community in Toulouse. He helped organize a cercle de silence in 2007. He also served as vice-president of the International Network for a Culture of Nonviolence and Peace.

Richard died on 24 June 2021 at the age of 95.

== Bibliography ==
- Piliers pour une culture de la non-violence (2001)
- Une vie dans le refus de la violence, Alain Richard, entretiens avec Christophe Henning (2010)
