= Pandukht Manukyan =

Armenian politician (1951–2021)

Member of the National Assembly of Armenia
- In office 1995–1999

Governor of Vayots Dzor Province
- In office 1997–2003
- Preceded by: Ashot Sargsyan
- Succeeded by: Samvel Sargsyan

Personal details
- Born: 25 May 1951 Jermuk, Armenian SSR, Soviet Union
- Died: 21 June 2021 (aged 70) Yerevan, Armenia
- Party: HHS

Pandukht Manukyan (Armenian: Պանդուխտ Հմայակի Մանուկյան; 25 May 1951 – 21 June 2021) was an Armenian politician.

== Biography ==
Manukyan studied civil engineering at the National Polytechnic University of Armenia from 1968 to 1973. He then worked as a foreman and civil engineer from 1973 to 1994. A member of the Pan-Armenian National Movement (HHS), he was elected to the National Assembly in 1995, serving until 1999. He then became Governor of Vayots Dzor Province, serving from 1997 to 2003.

Pandukht Manukyan died in Yerevan on 21 June 2021 at the age of 70.
