= Priscilla Kavita =

Namibian politician

MP Priscilla Kavita

Member of the National Assembly of Namibia
- In office 20 March 2015 – 20 March 2020

Personal details
- Born: October 6, 1961 Okakarara, Namibia
- Died: June 23, 2021 (aged 59)

Priscilla Kavita (October 6, 1961 – June 23, 2021) was a Namibian politician. A member of the South West Africa People's Organization, she served as a member of National Assembly of Namibia from 2015 to 2020.

On June 23, 2021, Kavita died and a state funeral was held in her honor.
