= Frances Stein =

French-American fashion designer (1937–2021)

Frances Patiky Stein (27 September 1937 – 6 June 2021) was a French-American fashion designer.

== Early life ==
Stein was born in Huntington, N.Y., on Long Island. Her mother, Frieda Krakower, was a homemaker and her father, Jacob owned a division retailer in Kings Park. Frances attended Smith College for 3 years before dropping out to work at Harper’s Bazaar.

== Career ==
Stein launched her career in the magazine world, working at Harper’s Bazaar, Glamour and Vogue. She then worked as a fashion editor and stylist for Halston, Calvin Klein and Chanel and had her own jewelry and accessory line from the late 80’s to mid 90’s.

== Death ==
Stein died 2021 of lung cancer at her apartment in Paris at the age of 84.
