= Juliette Minces =

French sociologist (1937–2021)

- Born: 18 July 1937; Paris, France
- Died: 24 June 2021 (aged 83); Fontenay-le-Comte, France
- Occupation: Sociologist

Juliette Minces (18 July 1937 – 24 June 2021) was a French political sociologist and writer.

== Biography ==
Minces was born into a family of Jewish Poles who arrived in France in the 1930s. She studied Chinese and Russian at the Institut national des langues et civilisations orientales. She was known as a traveler, feminist, and secularist, influenced by her time as a member of the Jeanson network during the Algerian War. Her articles on sociology were published in numerous journals, such as Les Temps modernes, Le Monde diplomatique, and Esprit. Her works were primarily based on immigration, the children of immigrants, and women in Islam.

Juliette Minces died in Fontenay-le-Comte on 24 June 2021 at the age of 83.

== Works ==
- Le Nord (1967)
- Un ouvrier parle (1969)
- L'Algérie indépendante (1972)
- Les travailleurs étrangers en France (1973)
- L'Algérie de Boumedièn (1978)
- Je hais cette France-là (1979)
- La femme dans le monde arabe (1980)
- La génération suivante (1986)
- L'Algérie de la révolution (1988)
- La femme voilée - L'islam au féminin (1990)
- Etat de crise (1993)
- Le Coran et les femmes (1996)
- De Gurs à Kaboul, une vie traversée par l'Histoire (2015)
