= Bernard Van Der Linde =

French cyclist (1946–2021)

Personal information
- Born: 14 June 1946 Amsterdam, Netherlands
- Died: 20 June 2021 (aged 75) Valence, Drôme, France

Cycling career
- Sport: Cycling
- Discipline: Road
- Role: Rider

Amateur team
- 1967: CSM Puteaux

Professional teams
- 1968–1970: Peugeot–BP–Michelin
- 1971: Bic

Bernard Jean Van Der Linde (14 June 1946 – 20 June 2021) was a Dutch-born French cyclist.

He was a good amateur cyclist in the 1960s, winning in 1966 Paris-Blancafort and in 1967 Paris–Rouen. He became professional in 1968 for Peugeot–BP–Michelin, riding for the team until 1970. He rode for Bic in 1971. As a professional he competed in the highest level cycling races, including the Tour of Flanders and the UCI Road World Championships.

== Major results ==
1967
1st Paris–Rouen
2nd Overall Tour du Loir-et-Cher
