= Ted C. Gertsch =

American politician (1933–2021)

Member of the Wyoming Senate
- In office 1986–1987

Personal details
- Born: December 3, 1933 Holyoke, Colorado, U.S.
- Died: June 6, 2021 (aged 87)
- Party: Republican
- Education: University of Wyoming

Ted C. Gertsch (December 3, 1933 – June 6, 2021) was an American politician. He served as a Republican member of the Wyoming Senate.

== Life and career ==
Gertsch was born in Holyoke, Colorado. He attended the University of Wyoming.

Gertsch was a board member of the First Wyoming Bank.

Gertsch served in the Wyoming Senate from 1986 to 1987.

Gertsch died on June 6, 2021, at the age of 87.
