= Luiz Pedro de Oliveira =

Brazilian politician (1953–2021)

Member of the Legislative Assembly of Maranhão
- In office 1 February 2003 – 1 January 2007
- In office 1 February 1983 – 1 February 1987

Personal details
- Born: Luiz Pedro de Oliveira e Silva; 26 February 1953; Juazeiro do Norte, Brazil
- Died: 2 June 2021 (aged 68); São Luís, Brazil
- Political party: PMDB; PCdoB; PSB; PDT

Luiz Pedro de Oliveira e Silva (26 February 1953 – 2 June 2021) was a Brazilian politician and journalist. He served in the Legislative Assembly of Maranhão from 1983 to 1987 and again from 2003 to 2007. He also served in the cabinet of Jackson Lago from 2007 to 2009.
