= José Luis Liso =

Spanish politician (died 2021)

José Luis Liso Marín (1934/5 – 27 June 2021) was a Spanish politician who served as a Senator.
