= Rafael Castillejo =

Spanish researcher (1952–2021)

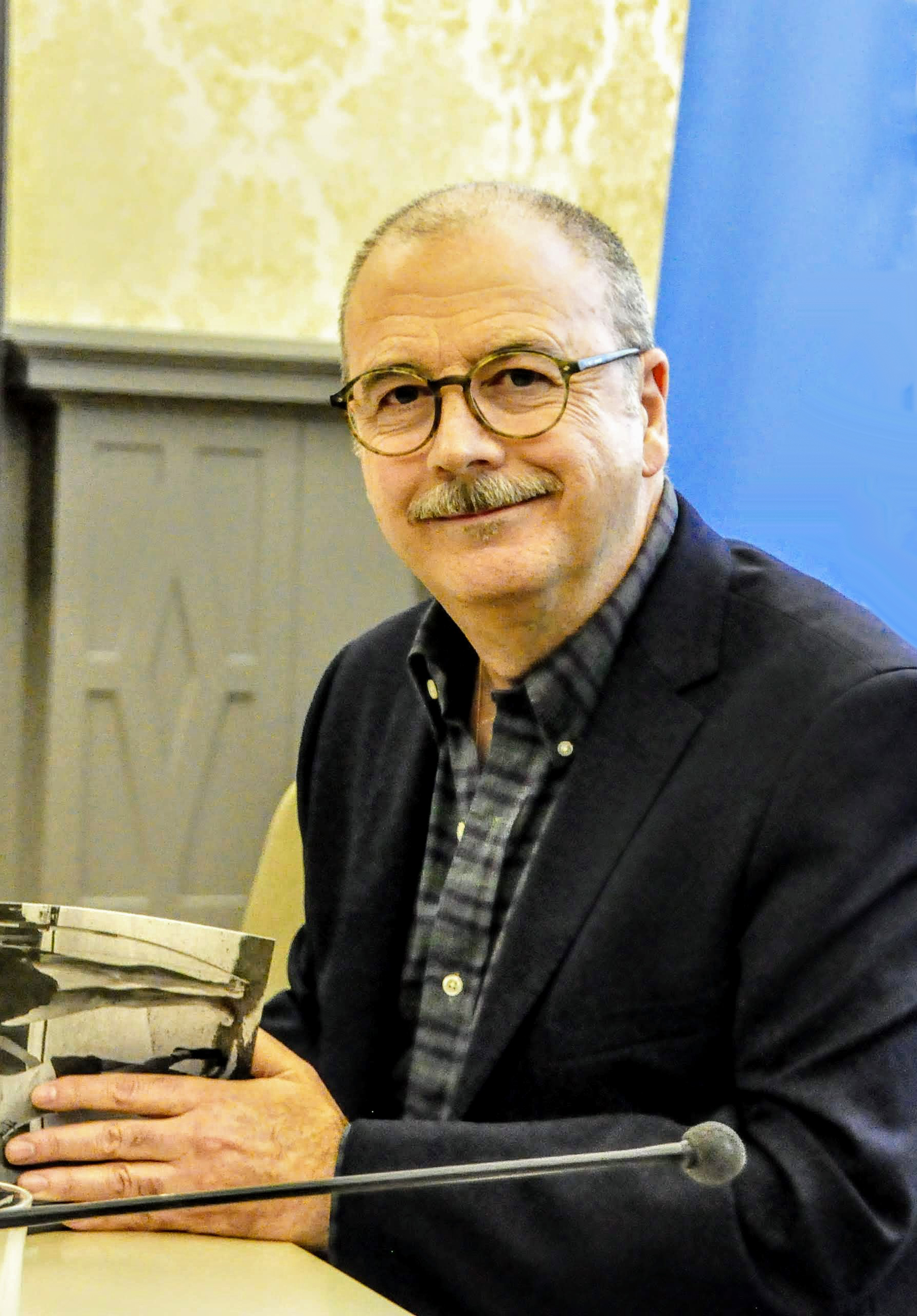
Rafael Castillejo

Rafael Castillejo (1952 – 4 June 2021) was a Spanish researcher, cultural activist, and writer.

He was the author of Recuerdos Compartidos -Memorias de un niño nacido en los cincuenta.

He was a prolific photographer.
