= Anne van der Meiden =

Dutch translator, writer, and theologian (1929–2021)

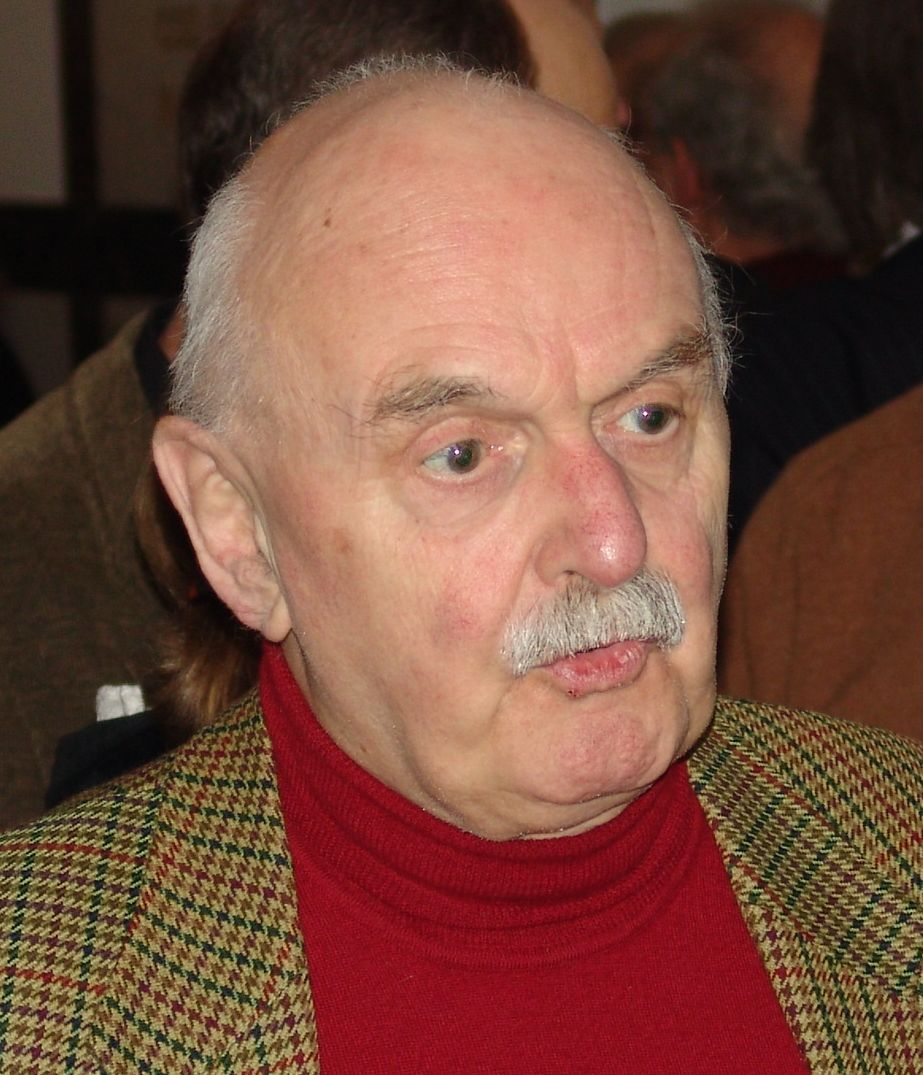

Anne van der Meiden (4 June 1929 – 3 June 2021) was a Dutch theologian, translator, and professor at Utrecht University. He translated the bible into Tweants dialect.
