= Roberto Derlin =

Italian footballer and manager (1942–2021)

Personal information
- Date of birth: 17 July 1942
- Place of birth: La Spezia, Italy
- Date of death: 4 June 2021 (aged 78)
- Place of death: Genoa, Italy
- Position: Midfielder

Youth career
- Spezia

Senior career*
Years	Team	Apps	(Gls)
- Spezia
1966–1969	Genoa		
1970–1974	Genoa		
1974–1975	Spezia		
- * Club domestic league appearances and goals

Roberto Derlin (17 July 1942 – 4 June 2021) was an Italian professional football player and manager who played as a midfielder.

== Career ==
Born in La Spezia, Derlin played for clubs including Spezia and Genoa.
