= Clive Murphy =

British author and social historian (1935–2021)

- Born: 28 November 1935; Liverpool, England
- Died: 17 June 2021 (aged 85); Southwark, London, England
- Occupations: Author, social historian
- Website: clivemurphy.org

Clive Murphy (28 November 1935 – 17 June 2021) was a British author and social historian. He was well known for his "Ordinary Lives" series, in which he compiled individuals' oral histories and turned them into memoirs.

== Biography ==
Murphy was born in Liverpool in 1935. He was brought up and educated in Ireland where he qualified as a solicitor in 1958. In the same year, he emigrated to London, eventually settling in Spitalfields in the early 1970s. His Summer Overtures was joint winner of ADAM International Review's First Novel Award in 1972. Freedom for Mr. Mildew & Nigel Someone appeared to critical acclaim in one volume in 1975. A series of ten recorded autobiographies, the "Ordinary Lives" series, followed. With the "Ordinary Lives" series he compiled individuals' oral histories and turned them into memoirs by voices that otherwise would not be heard. The memoirs are based on interviews he taped with individuals who were residents of Spitalfields in the 1960s, with Murphy writing them in the 1970s.

After 1999 Murphy published ten books of gay, often comic, ribaldry. The tenth, To Hell with Thomas Bowdler, Mrs Grundy and Mary Whitehouse!, was published in 2015.

Murphy died in June 2021, aged 85.

== Books ==
=== Novels ===
- Summer Overtures (1972)
- Freedom for Mr. Mildew & Nigel Someone (1975)

=== Ordinary Lives series ===
All the books in this series are edited by Clive Murphy and published under the subjects' own names.

- The Good Deeds of a Good Woman by Beatrice Ali (1976)
- Born to Sing by Alexander Hartog (1978)
- Four Acres and a Donkey: the memoirs of a lavatory attendant by S. A. B. Rogers (1979)
- Love, dears! The memoirs of a former chorus girl by Marjorie Graham (Dobson Books, 1980) (new edition 2013 by Macmillan as Up in Lights)
- Oiky: the memoirs of a pigman by Len Mills (1984)
- At the Dog in Dulwich: recollections of a poet by Patricia Doubell (1986)
- A Stranger in Gloucester: recollections of an Austrian in England by Mrs Falge-Wahl (1986)
- A Funny Old Quist: the memoirs of a gamekeeper by Evan Rogers (1986; new edition by Eland in 2009)
- Dodo by Dodo Lees (1993)
- Endsleigh: memoirs of a river riverkeeper by Horace Adams (1994)

=== Ribald Rhymes ===
- Sour Grapes (1999)
- Cave canem (2002)
- Orts and all: more ribald rhymes and gay doggery (2003)
- Lust and malice: ribald rhymes and other verse (2005)
- Sodomy is not enough! Ribald rhymes and other verse (2008)
- Heavenly blue: rhymes more ribald (2009)
- Gay abandon (2011)
- On Pleasure Bent (2013)
- Lock up your sons! (2014)
- To Hell with Thomas Bowdler, Mrs Grundy and Mary Whitehouse! (2015)
