= Petr Dostál =

Czechoslovak geographer (1947–2021)

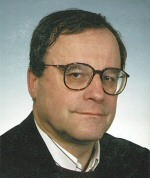
Petr Dostál

Petr Dostál (11 February 1947 – 1 June 2021) was a Czech geographer and professor at Jan Evangelista Purkyně University in Ústí nad Labem and Charles University. His work addressed cultural, political and economic aspects of social change in the European Union, post-communist Europe and specifically in the Czech Republic itself. He was also interested in the development of geographical systems in the context of risk processes.

== Biography ==
He was born in Prague, but spent his childhood in Děčín, where he graduated from high school (SVVŠ) in 1965. From 1965 to 1968, he studied professional geography at the Faculty of Science of Charles University. During his studies, he actively participated in the Prague Spring as part of the student movement, after which he emigrated to the Netherlands in September 1968.

After emigrating to the Netherlands, he studied social geography at the State University of Groningen (1972, MA). From 1972 to 1998, he worked at the University of Amsterdam as an assistant professor and associate professor in the fields of social and economic geography. He received his doctorate from the Faculty of Economics and Econometrics at the University of Amsterdam. After the Velvet Revolution began, he returned to Prague and from 1990 to 1994 coordinated a large-scale international project funded by the Dutch government aimed at strengthening research and teaching, with a focus on local and regional government reforms during the transition period. From 1990 he taught externally at the Department of Social Geography and Regional Development, Faculty of Science, Charles University, where he obtained a habilitation for regional development and spatial planning in 1992 and where he obtained the title of professor of social geography in 1998. From 1998 on, he taught Political Geography, History of Thought of Social and Regional Geography, and Social and Economic Geography of European Integration. He led a number of doctoral students, and also worked at the Department of Arts Management at the University of Economics in Prague and at the Department of Geography, Faculty of Science, JE Purkyně University in Ústí nad Labem. From 2002 to 2008, he was the chairman and member of the Commission for Social Sciences in the Council of the Government of the Czech Republic for Research and Development.

From 1992 to 2008, he was an executive member of the Geography and Public Administration, Public Policy and Governance commissions of the International Geographical Union (IGU). In 2009, he became a member of the IGU Geography and Governance Commission. He was also a member of the editorial boards of the Belgian Journal of Geography (Brussels) and the Migracijske i etničke teme (Zagreb).

Dostál authored dozens of texts published in international journals and books, and was the author, co-author or editor of 14 book publications. He was the leader and member of research teams of large domestic projects (e.g. the project Geographical Systems and Risk Processes in the Context of Global Change and European Integration, 2005–2008, MEYS and the project Effective Methodology of Support for Small and Medium Sectors –2015, Ministry of Culture).

He spoke five languages (Czech, Dutch, English, German and Russian). In his free time, he devoted himself to mountaineering (mainly in the Alps) and attempts to implement Dutch flowers (mainly orchids) in the harsh Czech climate.
