= Erwin Carl Gangl =

American electrical engineer (1938–2021)

Erwin Carl 'Erv' Gangl (February 16, 1938 – June 27, 2021) was an electrical engineer who worked as a civilian for the United States Air Force at Wright-Patterson Air Force Base. After taking early retirement in 1988, he continued working for defense contractors including Softech and CACI, Inc. in Centerville, OH. He was named Fellow of the Institute of Electrical and Electronics Engineers (IEEE) in 2013 for his development of digital avionics intra-communication systems and the military standard MIL-STD-1553.
