= Valentín de la Cruz =

Spanish monk (1928–2021)

Valentín de la Cruz (1928 – 11 June 2021) was a Spanish monk and historian. He was a member of the Real Academia de Bellas Artes de San Fernando.
