= Liliane Kerjan =

French author (1940–2021)

- Born: 13 February 1940
- Died: 28 June 2021 (aged 81)
- Occupation: Historian
- Writing career
- Notable awards: Prix Grand Ouest

Liliane Kerjan (13 February 1940 – 28 June 2021) was a French historian. She specialized in American literature.

== Biography ==
Kerjan earned a degree in English from Rennes 2 University and a doctoral degree from Blaise Pascal University in 1977. She would go on to serve as Vice-President of Rennes 2 and subsequently was Rector of the Académie de Limoges from 2000 to 2005. As part of the Fulbright Program, she was a visiting professor at the University of San Diego and Yale University.

In 1986, Kerjan began her collaboration with La Quinzaine littéraire. In 2010, she published a biography on Tennessee Williams and another on Arthur Miller in 2012. She was also President of the Institut franco-américain de Rennes from 2007 to 2020. In 2020, she published Ils ont fait un rêve, a biography on African American authors Richard Wright, Ralph Ellison, and James Baldwin.

Liliane Kerjan died on 28 June 2021 at the age of 81.

== Awards and honours ==
- In 2010, she received the Prix Grand Ouest from the Association des écrivains de l'Ouest.

== Books ==
- Albee (1971)
- Le théâtre d'Edward Albee (1978)
- L'égalité aux États-Unis. Mythes et Réalités (1991)
- L'Amérique urbaine des années soixante (1994)
- La consommation culturelle dans le monde anglophone (1994)
- Voix de femmes à la scène, à l'écran (1994)
- Dix-huit ans, vive la liberté ! (2003)
- Tennessee Williams (2010)
- Ce que je sais d'Arthur Miller (2012)
- Fitzgerald : Le désenchanté (2013)
- Truman Capote (2015)
- George Washington (2015)
- Abraham Lincoln (2015)
- Ils ont fait un rêve : Richard Wright, Ralph Ellison et James Baldwin : trois grands écrivains contre le racisme (2020)

== Decorations ==
- Officer of the Legion of Honour (2013)
