= Maciej Morawski =

Polish journalist (1929–2021)

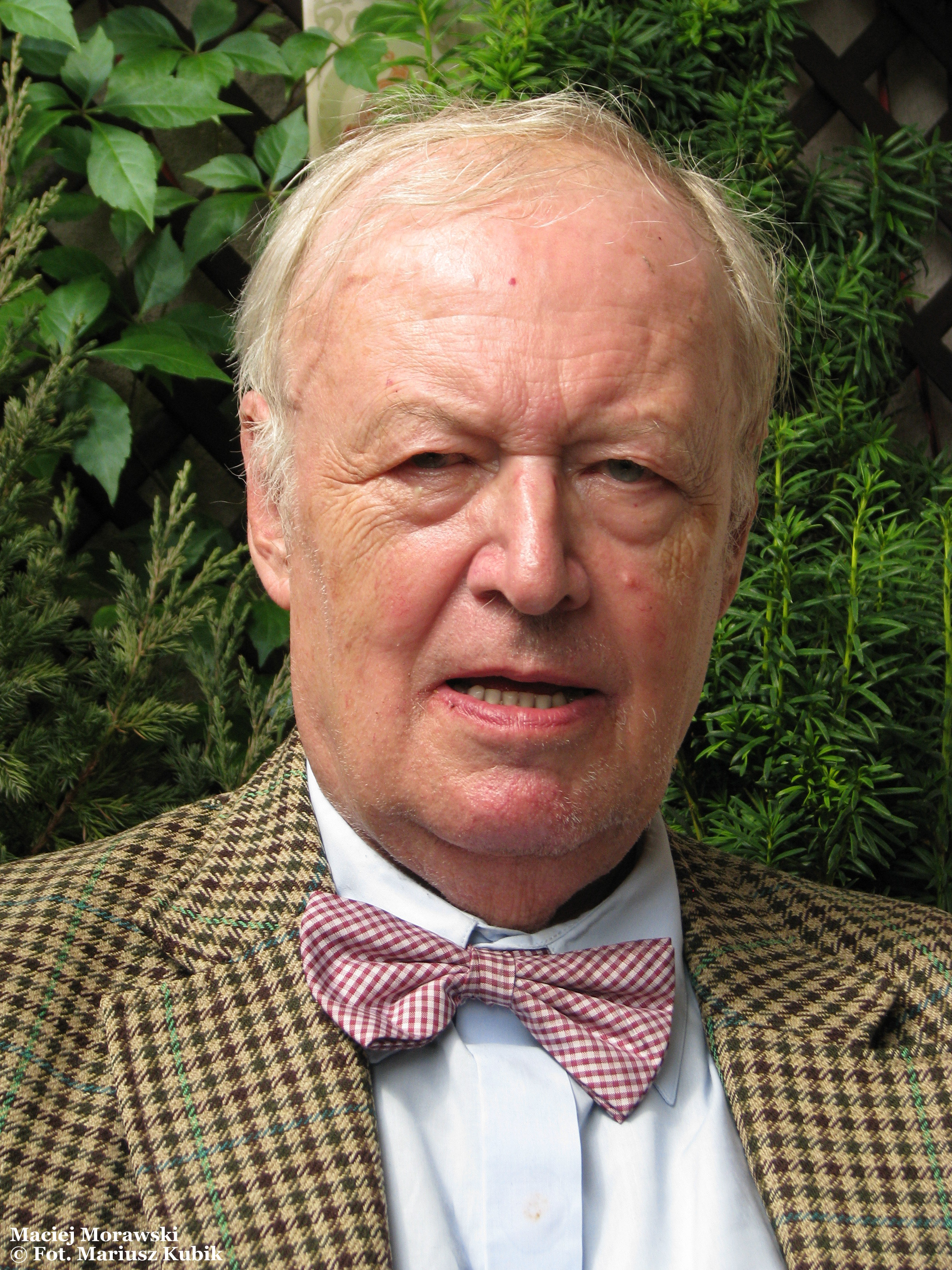
- Morawski in 2012
- Born: 20 September 1929; Poznań, Second Polish Republic
- Died: 6 June 2021 (aged 91); Paris, France
- Occupation: Journalist
- Years active: 1965-1992

Maciej Morawski (20 September 1929 – 6 June 2021) was a Polish journalist who worked for Radio Free Europe in France.

== Biography ==
He was the son of a politician, diplomat and minister of the Polish government, Kajetan Morawski (1892–1973). A survivor of the Warsaw Uprising, Morawski suffered from depression for many years. He arrived in France in November 1946 at the age of 17 while hoping to return to Poland interrupting his first studies. However, due to the rise of the Polish People's Republic, he found that this would not be possible. He spent time in Saint-Germain-des-Prés and became an activist for Christian democracy after studying in Paris and Strasbourg. In 1954, he was banned from entering the United States due to his former socialist ideals and alleged continued practice of homosexuality - which turned out to be a fabricated denunciation by the communist secret services intended to slander him. He would later denounce McCarthyism and its "witch hunt". He therefore worked for Radio Free Europe as a journalist and correspondent for the Polish language.

In 1967, Morawski was awarded the Armia Krajowa Cross, Commander of the Order of Merit of the Republic of Poland in 1993, and the Commander's Cross of the Order of Polonia Restituta in 1995. He would later receive a Commander's Cross with Star from the Order in 2007. In 2016, he was made a Knight of the Ordre des Arts et des Lettres.

He was an author of journals and one of the oldest Polish bloggers, he edited a website and a fanpage on Facebook until his death. His diaries have been published in four volumes entitled "Two Shores" (published 2015–2017). In 2015-2021 he was the honorary president of Jan Nowak-Jezioranski Association of Employees, Freelancers and Friends of Radio Free Europe in Warsaw, Poland.

Maciej Morawski died at the Pitié-Salpêtrière Hospital in Paris on 6 June 2021 at the age of 91. He was buried in Lailly-en-Val alongside his parents.
