= Tom Gibson (photographer) =

Scottish-born Canadian photographer (1930–2021)

Tom Gibson (1930 – June 1, 2021) was a Scottish-born Canadian photographer.

Gibson was born in Edinburgh. From 1976 to 1996, he was a professor of photography at Concordia University in Montreal, Canada.

His work is included in the collections of the National Gallery of Canada, and the Art Gallery of Ontario.
