= Matthieu Messagier =

French poet (1949–2021)

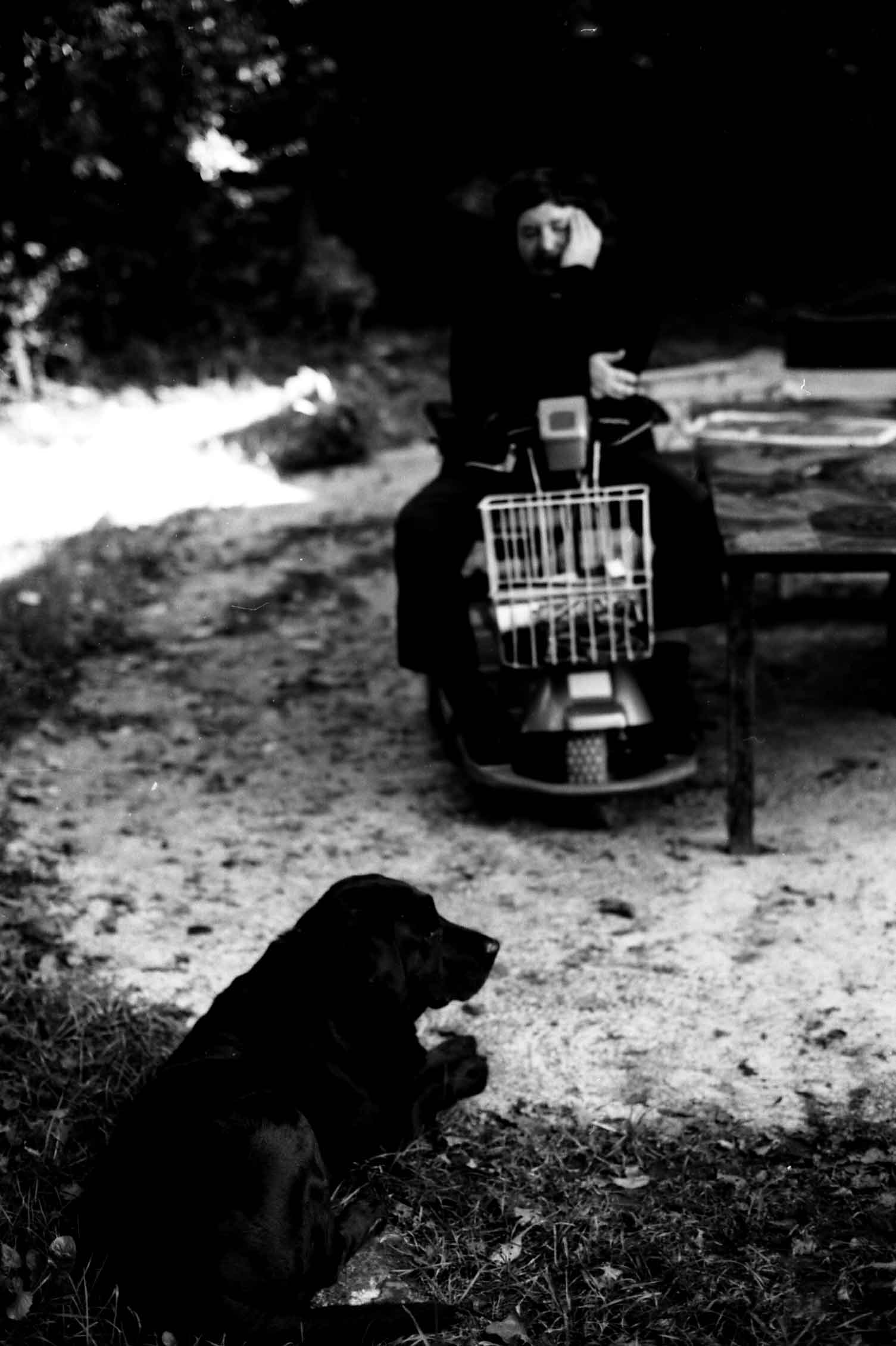
- Messagier in 1997
- Born: 19 July 1949; Colombier-Fontaine, France
- Died: 1 June 2021 (aged 71); Trévenans, France
- Occupation: Poet

Matthieu Messagier (19 July 1949 – 1 June 2021) was a French poet.

== Biography ==
Matthieu was the son of painter and abstract artist within the School of Paris Jean Messagier, and ceramic artist Marcelle Baumann-Messagier. He lived in the Latin Quarter of Paris and Franche-Comté from 1954 to 1967. In 1969, he published an anthology on his childhood, titled Œuvres 1954-1969.

In 1966, Messagier began living in Paris on the Rue Pierre-et-Marie-Curie to devote himself to poetry. He participated in the events of May 68 and published Les Laines penchées in 1975. He wrote Manifeste Électrique aux paupières de jupes, which was published by Le Soleil noir in 1971. He became heavily active in the 1970s and continued into the 1980s. In 2003, the film Le Dernier des immobiles, based on Messagier's works, was released.

Matthieu Messagier died in Trévenans on 1 June 2021, at the age of 71.
