= Juha Siira =

Finnish sailor (1946–2021)

Personal information
- Nationality: Finnish
- Born: 10 January 1946 Helsinki, Finland
- Died: 17 June 2021 (aged 75) Tuusula, Finland

Sport
- Sport: Sailing

Juha Siira (10 January 1946 – 17 June 2021) was a Finnish sailor. He competed at the 1976 Summer Olympics and the 1980 Summer Olympics.
