= Dennis Good =

English cricketer (1926–2021)

Personal information
- Full name: Dennis Cunliffe Good
- Born: 29 August 1926; Leeds, England
- Died: 26 June 2021 (aged 94); Oakville, Ontario, Canada
- Batting: Right-handed
- Bowling: Right arm fast-medium

Career statistics
Competition	First-class
Matches	4
Runs scored	54
Batting average	13.50
100s/50s	0/0
Top score	21
Balls bowled	462
Wickets	8
Bowling average	37.50
5 wickets in innings	0
10 wickets in match	0
Best bowling	2/34
Catches/stumpings	1/–
- Source: Cricinfo, 27 September 2021

Dennis Cunliffe Good (29 August 1926 – 26 June 2021) was an English cricketer who played in four first-class matches for Worcestershire and Glamorgan in the 1940s.

Good was born in Leeds and educated at Denstone College in Staffordshire, and at Sheffield University, where he studied textiles. His first-class debut, and his only outing for Worcestershire, was against the Combined Services at New Road in 1946. He took the single wicket of the 19-year-old John Dewes and scored 1 and 6 with the bat. The following year he appeared thrice for Glamorgan, claiming seven more wickets (though never more than two in an innings) and managing a top score of 21 in his final game at Derby.

He did his National Service in the Royal Air Force, and played league cricket for a while in the north of England. He migrated to Canada in 1952, and set up his own textile importing business in Quebec. After he retired, he lived in Ontario. For some time before his death in June 2021 he was Worcestershire's oldest surviving first-class cricketer. His wife Mary, to whom he was married for 64 years, predeceased him. They had three children.
