= Hash Halper =

American street artist (1980–2021)

- Born: Tzvi Mair Lewis; April 21, 1980; Philadelphia, Pennsylvania, U.S.
- Died: June 11, 2021 (aged 41); East River, New York City, U.S.
- Education: Yeshiva University
- Style: Graffiti
- Movement: Outsider art
- Parents: Eliot Lewis (father); Hana Nan Halper (mother)
- Website: Hash Halper RIP 1980-2021 🤍 on Instagram

Hash Halper (born Tzvi Mair Lewis; April 21, 1980 - June 11, 2021) was an American street artist. He was noted for his chalk hearts which he drew on the sidewalks of Manhattan.

== Biography ==
Halper was raised in a Modern Orthodox family in Philadelphia and Washington Heights, and was at one time enrolled at Yeshiva University. He first began producing graffiti on the streets of New York while being employed at Kossar's Bialys in 2014. In an interview for The New York Times Halper said that his initial inspiration for producing graffiti was a romantic engagement. However, after this relationship ended he continued to produce heart motifs on the walls of New York. Halper later went on to work in the arts while also being an employee of Postmates. He was arrested several times by the NYPD as a result of his artistic endeavours.
