= Pedro Taberner =

Spanish footballer (1946–2021)

Pedro Tabaner Nadal (11 November 1946 – 5 June 2021) was a Spanish footballer who played as a defender.

Taberner played in the Spanish League for Celta Vigo and Real Mallorca.
