= Édith Moskovic =

French Holocaust survivor (1931–2021)

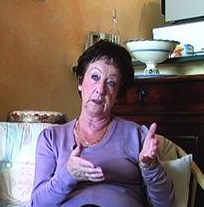
Moskovic in 2007

Édith Moskovic (12 August 1931 – 8 June 2021) was a French Holocaust survivor and activist.

In 2009, she was made a knight of the Legion of Honor.
