= Walter F. Huebner =

American astrophysicist (1928–2021)

Dr. Walter F. Huebner (February 22, 1928, in New York City – June 1, 2021, in Norman, Oklahoma) was an astrophysicist who wrote several books on comets including close-orbit and asteroids that may collide with the Earth, and how to prevent catastrophic collisions.

He received his Ph.D. from Yale in 1959. He worked as a leading scientist at Los Alamos National Laboratory from 1957 to 1987, and was associated with Southwest Research Institute in San Antonio, Texas, from 1987 to 2018.

He was affiliated with the IAU, Division XII, Commission 14 Atomic & Molecular Data, Division III WG Near Earth Objects, and Division XII Union-Wide Activities. He was the President of Division III, Commission 15 Physical Study of Comets & Minor Planets (2006–2009), Vice-President of Division III, Commission 15 Physical Study of Comets & Minor Planets (2003–2006), and an Organizing Committee Member of Division III Planetary Systems Sciences (2006–2009).

Asteroid (7921) Huebner has been named in his honor.

== Bibliography ==
- G. H. F. Diercksen, W. F. Huebner, and P. W. Langhoff., eds. Molecular Astrophysics: State of the Art and Future Directions. Dordrecht: D. Reidel Pub. Co., 1985. ISBN 978-90-277-2081-8
- Walter F. Huebner, ed. Physics and Chemistry of Comets. Berlin: Springer-Verlag, 1990. ISBN 978-0-387-51228-0
- Walter F. Huebner. Heat and gas diffusion in comet nuclei. Bern : ISSI, International Space Science Institute; Noordwijk : ESA Publications Division, 2006. OCLC 428187061
- Huebner, W. F., and W. David Barfield. Opacity. 2014. New York : Springer, 2014. ISBN 978-1-4614-8797-5.
