= Enzo Tonti =

Italian physicist and mathematician (1935–2021)

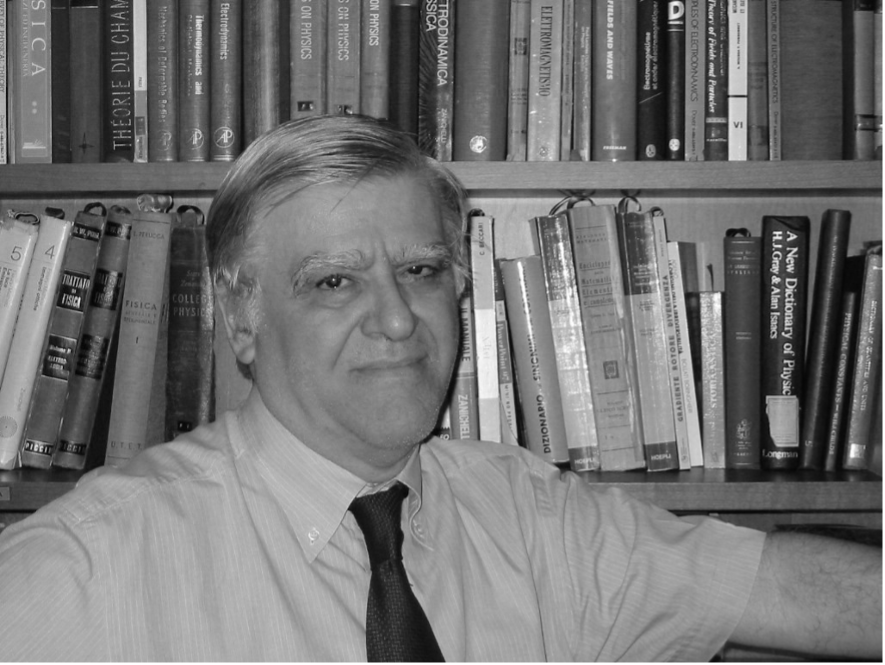
- Tonti c. 2007
- Born: 30 October 1935; Milan, Italy
- Died: 21 October 2021 (aged 85); Trieste, Italy
- Education: University of Milan
- Known for: Cell Method; Tonti Cells; Tonti Diagrams
- Scientific career
- Fields: Physics; Mathematics
- Workplaces: University of Trieste

Enzo Tonti (30 October 1935 – 10 June 2021) was an Italian physicist and mathematician, known for his contributions to engineering and mathematical physics.

== Life ==
Enzo Tonti was born in Milan. He attended a fine arts high school. He graduated in Mathematics and Physics at the University of Milan in 1961. He began work there in 1962 as a research assistant in the field of mathematical physics. In 1976, he accepted a professorship at the Engineering Faculty of the University of Trieste. After retirement, he was nominated professor emeritus. He married in 1962 and had three children (two daughters and one son).

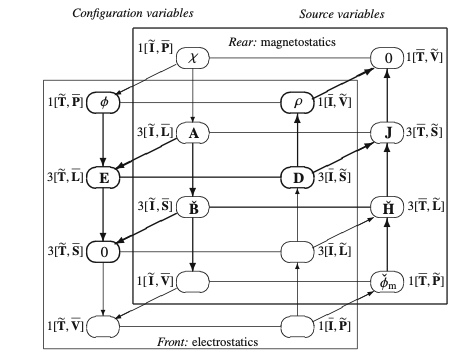
Tonti diagram of the electromagnetic field

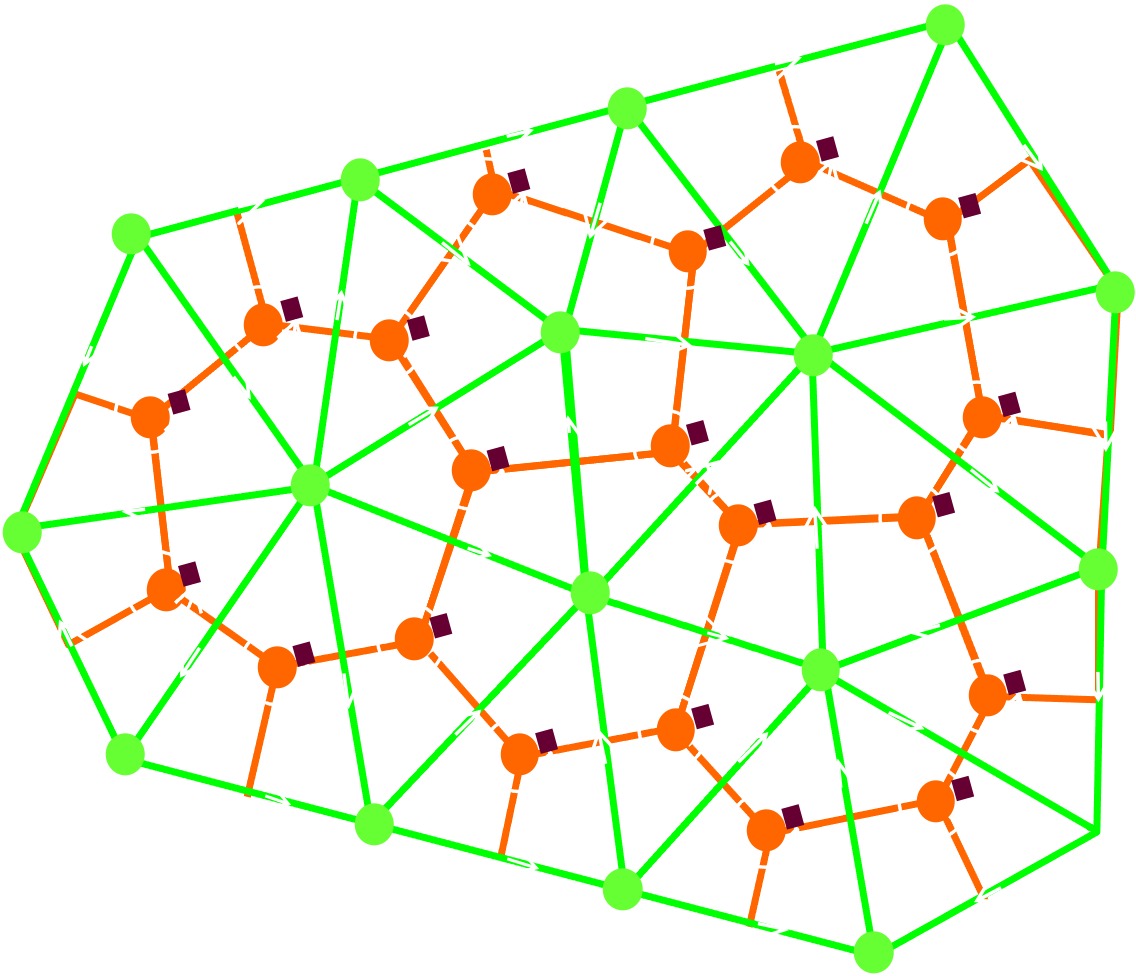
Two-dimensional dual cell complexes according to Enzo Tonti

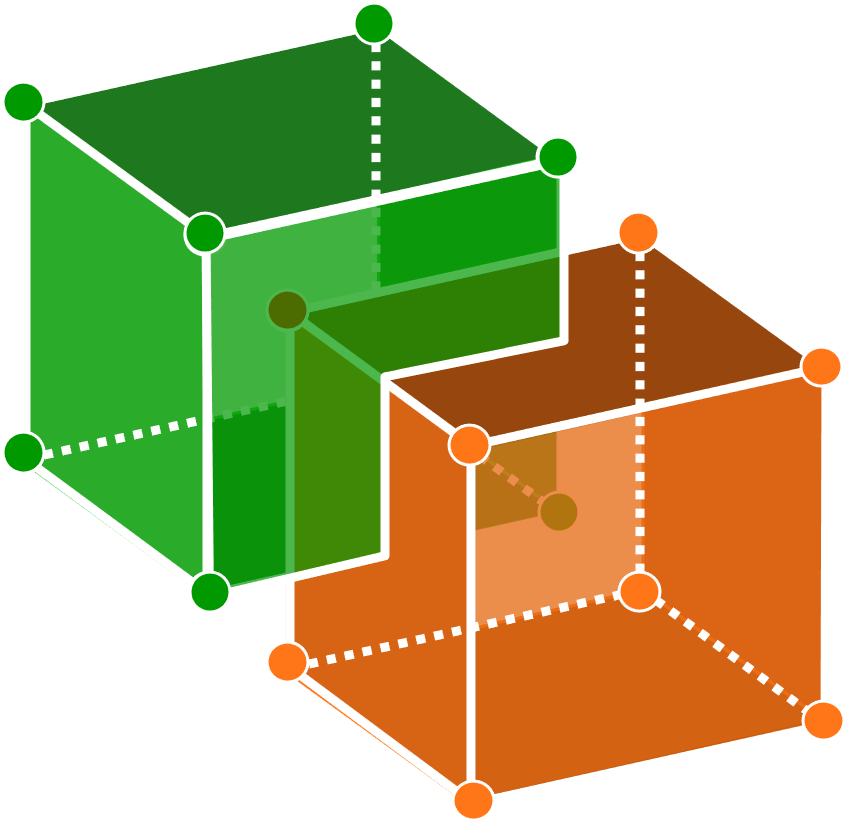
Three-dimensional dual cell complexes according to Enzo Tonti

== Selected publications ==
=== Journal articles ===
- Tonti E. A direct discrete formulation of field laws: The cell method. CMES- Computer Modeling in Engineering and Sciences. 2001 Jan 1;2(2):237-58.
- Tonti E. Finite formulation of the electromagnetic field. Progress in electromagnetics research, 2001. 32, pp. 1–44.
- Tonti E. Finite formulation of the electromagnetic field.IEEE Transactions on Magnetics. 2002 Aug 7;38(2):333-6.
- Tonti E. The reason for analogies between physical theories. Applied Mathematical Modelling. 1976 Jun 1;1(1):37-50
- Tonti E. Variational formulation for every nonlinear problem. International Journal of Engineering Science. 1984 Jan 1;22(11-12):1343-71.

=== Books ===
- Tonti, Enzo. The Mathematical Structure of Classical and Relativistic Physics A General Classification Diagram. Springer. 2013. ISBN 9781461474227
