= Xavier Lacroix =

French philosopher and theologian (1947–2021)

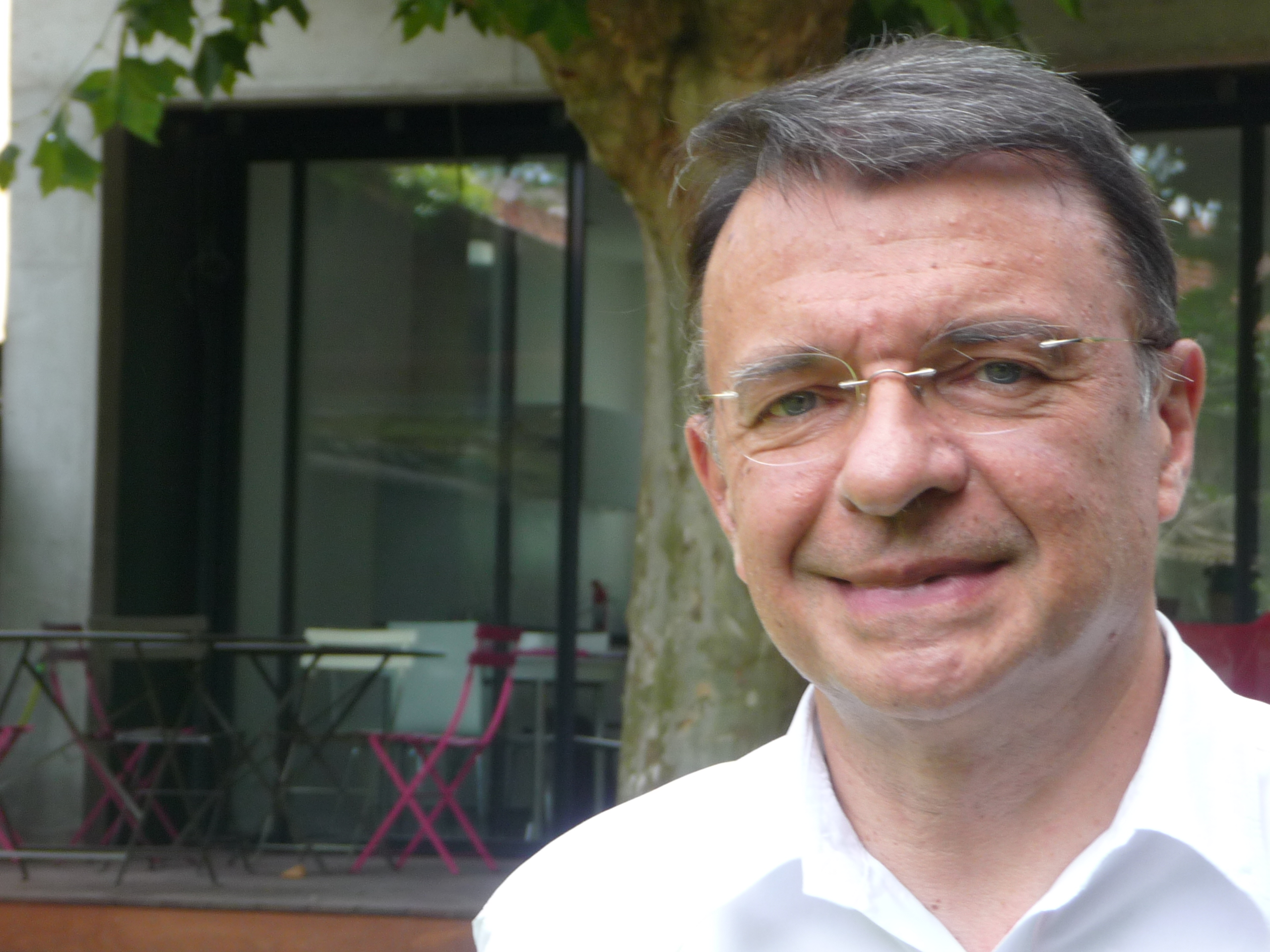
- Xavier Lacroix in 2010
- Born: 22 September 1947; Lyon, France
- Died: 29 June 2021 (aged 73); Lyon, France
- Occupations: Philosopher; Theologian
- Employer: Catholic University of Lyon

Xavier Lacroix (22 September 1947 – 29 June 2021) was a French philosopher and theologian.

He was a professor of philosophy and moral theology at the Catholic University of Lyon.
