= Giancarlo Amadeo =

Italian footballer (1934–2021)

Personal information
- Date of birth: 1 February 1934
- Place of birth: Busto Arsizio, Italy
- Date of death: 22 June 2021 (aged 87)
- Place of death: Busto Arsizio, Italy
- Position: Full back

Senior career*
| Years | Team | Apps | (Gls) |
- Pro Patria
- Legnano
- Vigevano
- * Club domestic league appearances and goals

Giancarlo Amadeo (1 February 1934 – 22 June 2021) was an Italian professional football player and coach.

== Career ==
Amadeo played as a full back for Pro Patria (making 256 appearances), Legnano and Vigevano, before working as a coach.
