= Jan Bieleman =

Dutch historian (1949–2021)

Jan Bieleman (Heino, 1949 – 9 June 2021) was a Dutch historian whose specialty was Dutch agriculture from the Middle Ages on. He is best known for his monograph Five centuries of farming: A short history of Dutch agriculture 1500-2000 (2000). From 1982 until he retired in 2012 he was a member of the Rural and Environmental History chair group at Wageningen University & Research. Bieleman was an editor for the series Techniek in Nederland in de twintigste eeuw, published by the Instituut voor Transitiestudies of the Stichting Historie der Techniek; he was responsible for the agriculture section.

== Career ==
Bieleman was trained in landscape architecture at the Landbouwhogeschool in Wageningen, and his work as a historical geographer benefited from his knowledge of landscape history. He then shifted to agricultural history, and his dissertation research culminated in his doctoral dissertation, Boeren op het Drentse zand 1600-1910: Een nieuwe visie op de 'oude' landbouw (1987), an extensive research project that focused on agricultural practices in the Dutch province of Drenthe; he graduated cum laude. That project fitted in with the interest in regional studies of the Wageningen chair group he worked with, but his was innovative in extending the field into the 19th century. At the same time, the study was a critique of Bernard Slicher van Bath's influential Een samenleving onder spanning: Geschiedenis van het platteland in Overijssel (1956), the first Dutch regional monograph, which focused on agricultural developments in Gelderland, and the book that made Bieleman move from landscape architecture to agricultural history. Bieleman proved that far from static and repetitive, farming in the early modern period was dynamic.

Bieleman's first published monograph was a history of his native village, Heino, in Overijssel: Heino: Een geschiedenis van mens en plaats ("Heino: A history of men and space"), published in the mid-1970s. He was published widely, and his Five centuries of farming: a short history of Dutch agriculture 1500–2000 is considered his masterpiece. The book, in English, was adapted and translated from his Boeren in Nederland, 1500–2000, which in turn was the successor of Geschiedenis van de landbouw in Nederland, 1500–1950, a publication based on his dissertation. With Peter Priester he published the third volume in the Technology in the Twentieth Century series.

He taught agricultural history at Wageningen from 1986 until 2012.

Bieleman is also known for his extensive contributions to the scholarship on the history of Drenthe. When he was hired in 1979 by historian J. Heringa, then archivist for the Drents Archief, to do research for a handbook on the history of Drenthe, it soon became clear that the archives offered so much material that the history of Drenthe's agriculture needed to be rewritten, and the result was that a special section on agriculture was added to the handbook. Then, his Boeren op het Drentse zand 1600-1910 did away with misconceptions of agriculture in Drenthe as static and backward. He was editor-in-chief of the 1994 publication Boerenlandschap in beweging: Anderhalve eeuw boerenbedrijf in Drenthe en het Drents Landbouwgenootschap, and until 1998 he was on the editorial board of the Nieuwe Drentse Volksalmanak.

== Bibliography ==
=== Monographs ===
- Heino: Een geschiedenis van mens en plaats
- Geschiedenis van de landbouw in Nederland, 1500–1950
- Boeren in Nederland, 1500–2000
- Five centuries of farming: a short history of Dutch agriculture 1500–2000

=== Notable articles ===
- Bieleman, J. (1990). "De verscheidenheid van de landbouw op de Nederlandse zandgronden tijdens 'de lange zestiende eeuw'" (PDF). BMGN: Low Countries Historical Review. 105 (4): 537–52. doi:10.18352/bmgn-lchr.3289.
