= Roger Mpanano =

Congolese politician (1962–2021)

Member of the National Assembly
- Constituency: Bukavu

Personal details
- Born: 21 October 1962 Bukavu, South Kivu, Dem. Rep of Congo
- Died: 19 June 2021 (aged 58) Kinshasa
- Party: Union for the Congolese Nation
- Children: 8
- Education: Collège Alfajiri

Roger Mpanano Ntamwenge (21 October 1962 – 19 June 2021) was a Congolese politician, founding member of the Union for the Congolese Nation and former Member of the National Assembly of the Democratic Republic of the Congo.

During his tenure, the MP Roger Mpanano strongly advocated the rejection of the transfer of water from the Ubangi River to Lake Chad, a project he deemed harmful to the DRC especially on the environmental point of view.

== Early life and education ==
He did his secondary studies first at Mugeri Minor Seminary, then at Alfajiri College. He pursued higher studies at the Higher Institute for Rural Development (ISDR) where he later served as a Lecturer for a number of years.

== Political career ==
Former member of the PPRD, the late Roger Mpanano was the first deputy of national MP Louis Leonce Muderhwa; whom he replaced as soon as he was promoted to governor of South Kivu in 2007. It is therefore he who ended the term of MP Louis Leonce.

In 2008, along with 11 other elected officials from South Kivu, Roger Mpanano followed Vital Kamerhe to create the UNC. He was elected to the UNC list in 2011.

In 2018, he did not run as a national MP; but rather as deputy of the Yabe Ntaitunda; the current vice president of the provincial assembly of South Kivu.

== Personal life ==
Roger Mpanano was married, father of eight children including four girls and four boys. He died in 2021 from COVID-19.
