= Hatiro Shimomoto =

Brazilian politician and lawyer (1935–2021)

State Deputy of São Paulo
- In office 1971–1999

Personal details
- Born: 18 December 1935; Guararapes, São Paulo, Brazil
- Died: 21 June 2021 (aged 85); São Paulo, São Paulo, Brazil
- Political party: DEM; PPR; PDS; ARENA

Hatiro Shimomoto (18 December 1935 – 21 June 2021) was a Brazilian politician and lawyer from the state of São Paulo.

== Biography ==
He was a member of the Legislative Assembly of São Paulo.

On 21 June 2021, Shimomoto died at São Paulo, at the age of 85 due to complications brought on by COVID-19.
