= Quarto Trabacchini =

Italian politician (1949–2021)

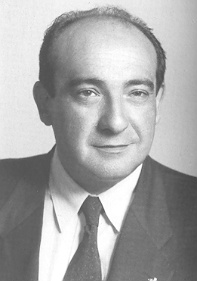
Photo of Quarto Trabacchini

Quarto Trabacchini (1949 – 11 June 2021) was an Italian politician who served as a Deputy.
