= Fulvio Varglien =

Italian footballer (1936–2021)

Personal information
- Date of birth: 3 January 1936
- Place of birth: Fiume, Kingdom of Italy
- Date of death: 7 June 2021 (aged 85)
- Place of death: Italy
- Height: 1.79 m (5 ft 10 in)
- Position: Midfielder

Senior career*
| Years | Team | Apps | (Gls) |
- Triestina
- Livorno
- Torino
- * Club domestic league appearances and goals

Fulvio Varglien (also spelt Varljen; 3 January 1936 – 7 June 2021) was an Italian professional football player and coach.

== Early life ==
Born in Fiume, Varglien moved to Trieste as a refugee in 1947, aged 11. His father had died in World War II.

== Career ==
He played football for Triestina (initially combining his playing career with his job on the railways), Livorno and Torino, and later worked as a coach.
