= Georgios Drys =

Greek politician (1944–2021)

Georgios Drys (Γεώργιος Δρυς) (1944 – 3 June 2021) was a Greek politician who served as a member of parliament from 1989 to 2004 and as Minister of Agriculture from 2001 to 2004.
