= Limbo (disambiguation) =

Limbo is an afterlife condition in Catholic theology and other denominations and religions.

Limbo may also refer to:

== Film ==
- Limbo (1972 film), an American film by Mark Robson
- Limbo (1999 film), an American film by John Sayles
- Limbo (2010 film), a Norwegian film by Maria Sødahl
- Limbo (2014 film), an Argentinian film by Iván Noel
- Limbo (2019 film), a German one-shot film by Tim Dünschede
- Limbo (2020 film), a British film by Ben Sharrock
- Limbo (2021 film), a Chinese-Hong Kong film by Cheang Pou-soi
- Bardo, False Chronicle of a Handful of Truths (working title: Limbo), a 2022 Mexican film by Alejandro González Iñárritu
- Limbo (2023 film), an Australian film by Ivan Sen

== Gaming ==
- Limbo (video game), a 2010 video game
- Limbo (Dungeons & Dragons), a fictional plane of existence in Dungeons & Dragons
- Limbo, a fictional dimension in DmC: Devil May Cry

== Literature ==
- Limbo (short story collection), a collection of short stories by Aldous Huxley
- Limbo (Brathwaite poem), a poem by Edward Kamau Brathwaite
- Limbo (Coleridge poem), a poem by Samuel Taylor Coleridge
- Limbo (DC Comics), a fictional location in the DC Comics
- Limbo (Marvel Comics), a fictional dimension in the Marvel Comics universe
- First circle of hell or Limbo, a level of hell in the Inferno by Dante Alighieri
- "Limbo", a poem by Seamus Heaney in Wintering Out
- "Limbo", an 1897 essay by Vernon Lee
- Limbo, a novel by Andy Secombe
- Limbo, a novel by Bernard Wolfe

== Music ==
- Limbo (Throwing Muses album), or the title song
- Limbo (Aminé album) (2020)
- "Limbo", the debut album by Namasenda (2026)
- "Limbo" (Daddy Yankee song) (2012)
- "Limbo" (Bryan Ferry song) (1988)
- "Limbo" (Royal Blood song) (2021)
- "Limbo", a 1980 song by Fischer-Z from Going Deaf for a Living
- "Limbo", a 2023 song by Keshi (singer)
- "Limbo", a 1997 song by Kylie Minogue from Impossible Princess
- "Limbo", a 2016 song by Mishlawi
- "Limbo", a 1996 instrumental by Rush from Test for Echo
- "Limbo", a 2019 song by XXXTentacion and Killstation from Bad Vibes Forever (2019)

== People ==
- Limbo Parks (born 1965), American gridiron football player
- Agnes Limbo (born 1957), Namibian politician

== Other uses ==
- Limbo (boutique), a former shop in Manhattan, New York, US
- Limbo (dance), a traditional Trinidadian dance that involves bending backwards under a pole
- Limbo (programming language)
- Limbo (skating), a sport in which a person roller skates underneath an obstacle
- Limbo (weapon), an anti-submarine weapons system
- Limbo, a fictional galaxy in the SilverHawks animated television series

== See also ==
- Escheat, a common law doctrine
- In Limbo (disambiguation)
- "Limbo Rock", a song popularized by Chubby Checker in 1962
- Limbo Party, a 1962 album by Chubby Checker
- Mount Limbo, a mountain in Nevada, US
- Otherplace, a fictional dimension in the Marvel Comics universe
- Purgatory, a distinct afterlife concept in Roman Catholic theology
