= Unholy Loves =

1979 novel by Joyce Carol Oates

- First edition
- Author: Joyce Carol Oates
- Language: English
- Publisher: Vanguard Press
- Publication date: 1979
- Publication place: United States
- Media type: Print (hardback)
- Pages: 335
- ISBN: 978-0814908136

Unholy Loves is a novel written by Joyce Carol Oates. It was published in 1979 by Vanguard Press. In an interview Oates called it "an academic comedy set at an upstate New York university larger than Bennington, smaller than Cornell, prestigious yet not quite competitive with Harvard, Princeton, and Yale."

== Setting ==
While most of her satirical academic short stories in The Hungry Ghosts (1974) were set at a fictitious, small, mediocre university in Southern Ontario, Hilberry, Oates created a very distinguished setting for her novel Unholy Loves. Woodslee University is situated two hundred and fifty miles north of New York City and is introduced as "a private, richly endowed institution famous in the East for its high tuition, its liberal arts and fine arts departments, and its academic rigor". The fact that "students rejected at Harvard, Yale, and Princeton routinely come to Woodslee, as they come to Cornell or the University of Pennsylvania, or Boston University, or even the state universities of New York" (p. 135), indicates its prominent place in the American university system.

Woodslee's environment is described as being "densely wooded and impenetrable" (p. 135), and its symbolic name also hints at its isolation, which is said to be responsible for Woodslee's intense social life:

“But there are parties. There will always be parties. Woodslee is a very social university - detractors might say it is desperately social, because of its isolation, and the long dark merciless winters. Without social life one would simply freeze to death here. Without friends (or the semblance of friends) one would simply die. (p.24)

== Structure ==
The structure of the novel also reflects the crucial importance of Woodslee's social life. Each of the novel's five parts is centered on either a party - I. At the Byrnes' (p. 1); II. At the Seidels' (p. 97); III. At Albert St. Dennis's and At the Housleys' (p. 165) - a dinner - IV. Hour of Lead (p. 243) - or a luncheon - V. In the Founders Room (p. 289). As Oates gives the exact dates of these events at the beginning of each part - I. September 11 (p. 3); II. November 5 (p. 99); III. December 31 (p. 167); IV. March 8 (p. 245); V. May 10 (p. 291) - it becomes obvious that the novel comprises almost exactly an entire academic year, yet is only concerned with the decisive social events.

Each of the novel's five parts is subdivided into four or five sections which focus on one of the central characters - Albert St. Dennis, Brigit Stott, Alexis Kessler, Lewis Seidel, Oliver Byrne, and Sandra Jaeger - and reveal their background, their activities before, during, and after the social event, their reflections and view of the other guests. In the course of these sections Woodslee's second main characteristic is disclosed, the fact that "there are rumors about everyone at Woodslee" (p. 44). A considerable amount of the individual character's reflections and the conversation at the parties deals with the gossip and the rumors which circulate among the Woodslee community; and in this respect it resembles the Hilberry community Oates depicted in The Hungry Ghosts.

== Central characters ==
In Unholy Loves, Albert St. Dennis, the British poet, "serves well as a ruthless exposer of those around him," as A. G. Mojtabai observes in her review of the novel.

Albert St. Dennis is over seventy years old, his wife has died only a year ago, and therefore he is very lonely, mostly drunk, and by no means able to fulfill the expectations of the English department of Woodslee University, which has hired him for one year as their "Distinguished Professor of Poetry." Yet he apparently deserves this title: the Times Literary Supplement has called him "the incontestably finest of living English poets" since Auden's death (p. 6), and even St. Dennis himself admits that he is famous: "'Famous' in the narrow hothouse world of letters" (p. 13).

He has always detested America and declined to visit it (p. 103), but now "he has sold himself quite shamelessly - and with necessity" (p. 6) to Woodslee University. Nonetheless, he still detests "the American flummery" (p. 5) and even his hosts, "the educated and articulate and well-to-do members of a nation that barely tolerates the serious arts, and is frankly contemptuous of poetry" (p. 13). He considers them as "greedy strangers, they are memorizing him, storing up anecdotes to be repeated after his death" (p. 3), and the expectations of the different members of the English department reveal that this view is not at all inadequate. It is certainly debatable whether he wills his death, whether it is simply an accident of drunkenness, or whether one considers it the result of Lewis Seidel's carelessness; yet his name suggests that he has to be seen as a kind of martyr: according to Gregory of Tours, Saint Denis was "a bishop sent under the reign of Decius (249-51) to preach to the Parisians, who after divers torments suffered martyrdom."

Brigit Stott is thirty-eight years old, a recent divorcee, and "very lonely" (p. 21). As a result of her loneliness her imagination has begun to swerve "to such idle hopes, such pathetic aspirations" (p. 37), which always "turned about the figure of Albert St. Dennis" (p. 38). She has hoped that they would fall in love: "He would be one of her holy loves. She has had holy loves, and unholy loves. Very few of the former; too many of the latter" (p. 36). This allusion to the novel's title - which is taken from St. Augustine's Confessions: "To Carthage then I came, where a cauldron of unholy loves sang all about mine ears" (p. 258) - indicates that her hopes concerning St. Dennis have to be considered as some of the "unholy loves" which circle around him; and the characterizations of Alexis Kessler, Lewis Seidel, and Oliver Byrne disclose that St. Dennis is indeed the center of "a cauldron of unholy loves," of secret hopes, expectations, and fantasies which focus on his visit to Woodslee.

Oates describes Brigit Stott's aspirations in detail and with remarkable irony: "St. Dennis would be very like his photographs: a beautiful old man" (p. 38); introduced to her, "he would be struck by her face, by something in her face" (p. 39).

Seated beside her at dinner he would pay attention to no one else. ... In the days that follow he pursues her, ... marries her, they return to England. They are a devoted couple. Everyone is amazed. Brigit Stott puts aside her own work and dedicates herself to Albert St. Dennis. ... An exceptional marriage. Noted by all. ... Of course his young wife accompanies him everywhere. It is rumored that she helped him compose his brief but memorable Nobel Prize address. ... "Behind Albert St. Dennis stands Brigit Stott," people will say. "She saved his life, you know. A remarkable woman." (pp.40-41).

It is just as ironic that St. Dennis differs completely from her imaginations and is by no means capable of fulfilling any of her hopes: "He is a terrible disappointment to her, of course, hardly the lover-savior she had anticipated, just an old man, a sick-looking old man" (p. 43).

Alexis Kessler is thirty-two years old, "the aging 'Wunderkind' of the music department" (p. 26). He is portrayed as "one of those very young debuts (as a pianist), and afterwards it must have gone to his head, all the attention, the admiration and applause and fuss" (p. 44). He is a working on a very ambitious project, composing a song cycle based on one of St. Dennis's sonnet sequences; and he hopes that St. Dennis will give him the permission to use his sonnets in the course of his visit to Woodslee (p. 53).

Lewis Seidel is fifty-one years old, a colleague of Brigit Stott, and another ambitious intellectual who is only interested in his work and career:

Phi Beta Kappa in his junior year at City College; prizes as an under graduate; high praise and encouragement from his professors. A Woodrow Wilson Fellowship for graduate work at Columbia. High grades, high expectations, a series of articles published in his twenties, a considerable name for himself before the age of thirty; an appointment at Brown that had not worked out, a year in England; more articles and reviews and the appointment at prestigious Woodslee; the controversial "Cul-de-sac" and more articles and reviews and .… (p.155)

Lewis Seidel's latest plans focus on "a highly original kind of critical work: ... a dialogue, a duet, his own voice and that of a representative artist of the old order, locked together in ferocious combat. The artist is to be, of course, Albert St. Dennis" (p. 65). Just like Brigit Stott's absurd aspirations, Seidel's fantasies about the development of a friendship between the two men are also described with utmost irony (pp .66-69), and of course they remain unfulfilled as well.

Oliver Byrne, the Dean of Humanities, resembles Lewis Seidel, yet he has been even more successful. He has "published his dissertation at the age of twenty-eight, and was drawn into university politics the first year of his first appointment, at the University of Pennsylvania. An assistant dean at thirty-one, a dean at thirty-five, Dean of Humanities here at Woodslee at forty-two, and a most promising future, as everyone keeps telling him" (p. 83). Everybody agrees that he has done an excellent job, so far, and even Lewis Seidel admits that "the 'coup' of St. Dennis is certainly an enviable one" (p. 70). It is known that Byrne had flown to London twice to talk with St. Dennis, and that he came to Woodslee "not only because of the amount of money offered but because of the young dean's persuasive personality" (p. 70). Therefore, St. Dennis's presence at Woodslee is a personal success for Oliver Byrne, who has further plans, too: he intends to be president of Woodslee very soon, which is "Oliver's highest hope" (p. 273). But St. Dennis's death thwarts all his plans, as he is forced to resign from his deanship and has to leave Woodslee (p. 328).

There are several other members of the English department who remain in the background of the novel. Warren Hochberg, the chairman of the English department, is introduced as the author of several well-received scholarly books and "an indecipherable personality whom everyone feared" (p. 29); and it is symptomatic that he becomes acting dean after Oliver Byrne's resignation (p. 292). Gowan Vaughan-Jones is "passionately caught up in his scholarly and critical work" (p. 197), and is working on an immense study of twentieth-century poetics that will include a chapter on St. Dennis and his imitators. In conjunction with this work he had planned a series of taped interviews with St. Dennis, and "had even arranged with the editors of several prestigious journals for the publication of these interviews" (p. 109), but of course it never comes to that. His similarity to the novel's central characters is obvious, and Brigit Stott's view of Vaughan-Jones discloses his role as a symbolic figure and has to a be applied to his colleagues as well: "It is too easy, Brigit thought, to dismiss him as a stereotype, a parody. He is a stereotype and a parody, and yet he lives, he breathes, he walks about in the world, he is quite a successful academic and his career has just begun." (p. 234)

Yet there is one character who differs completely from these typical representatives of the academic world Oates depicts. Gladys Fetler is sixty-three years old, “gracious and ladylike and kindly and youthful" (p. 33). She is popular both with her students and her colleagues, she publishes regularly, but she also has "these wild wacky hobbies - mountain-climbing, bird-watching treks into the Everglades and into the Arctic Circle, canoeing in the White Mountains" (p. 34). In comparison with her younger narrow-minded and career-oriented colleagues, she clearly represents an anachronism; and it is significant that she is forced into early retirement at the end of the novel (p. 292).

All these characters are part of Woodslee's establishment, yet Oates also depicts the situation of the younger generation of academics, which is represented by two families, the Jaegers and the Swansons. The reflections of Sandra Jaeger disclose her husband's and their friends' problems to get a job (pp. 93–94) and their happiness about their new position in the Woodslee community:

Better not to think about the situation. Better to put it all behind her. After all, their lives have changed completely now. They are no longer graduate students; they are adults, with a genuine place in an academic community. Ernest is not a teaching assistant, he is an assistant professor of English, on what is called the regular payroll; and Sandra is on a list, a marvelous list, of names that belong to faculty wives. Some years ago, in the late sixties and early seventies, it might have seemed inconceivable that anyone, particularly bright young intellectuals, would have prized such things so highly, and so desperately; but it is no longer the late sixties and the early seventies. (pp .94-95)

But when Ernest Jaeger is informed that his contract will not be renewed for the next year, Sandra realizes that they are by no means firmly established: "The new division, Sandra thinks dully. The new struggle. Between those who have unassailable positions and those who have not. Between the aristocrats and the stateless" (p. 197).

Thus, the situation of the Jaegers and the Swansons exemplifies Oates's awareness of the economic problems academics have to face in the late 1970s. Yet these problems remain in the background of the novel, as Oates is primarily concerned with the world she is familiar with, the academic establishment.

== Reception ==
Again Oates portrays ambitious, career-oriented "hungry ghosts" and mocks a gossiping and back-biting academic scene, and on the whole the pretentious Woodslee community does not differ from the small, mediocre world of Hilberry University in The Hungry Ghosts, her collection of short stories published in 1974. Therefore one has to agree with Anne Duchéne who observes that “not all the habitual energy and justice in the writing can quite dispel, here, the sense of déja lu."
