= Sitting in Limbo =

Sitting in Limbo may refer to:

- "Sitting in Limbo", a song by Jimmy Cliff from his album Another Cycle
- Sitting in Limbo (album), an album by Jessica Molaskey
- Sitting in Limbo (1986 film), a Canadian docudrama film
- Sitting in Limbo (2020 film), a British television docudrama film

== See also ==
- In Limbo (disambiguation)
- Limbo (disambiguation)
