= In Limbo =

In Limbo may refer to:

== Film and television ==
- In Limbo (2021 film), a Russian crime film
- In Limbo (2024 film), a Polish documentary film
- In Limbo (TV series), a 2023 Australian television series written by Lucas Taylor

== Music ==
- "In Limbo", a song by Genesis from the album From Genesis to Revelation
- "In Limbo", a song by Radiohead from the album Kid A
- In Limbo (album) by Pete Max
- In Limbo (EP) by Lydia Lunch
- In Limbo: The Lost Puracane Sessions, an album by Puracane

== Other uses ==
- Development hell, also called "in limbo", a period during which a film or other project is trapped in development
- In Limbo (novel), by Christopher Evans

== See also ==
- Limbo, an afterlife condition between life and death, in Catholic theology
- Limbo (disambiguation)
- Love in Limbo (film), a 1993 Australian romantic comedy film
- Sitting in Limbo (disambiguation)
