= The Hungry Ghosts: Seven Allusive Comedies =

1974 short story collection by Joyce Carol Oates

- First edition
- Author: Joyce Carol Oates
- Language: English
- Publisher: Black Sparrow Press
- Publication date: 1974
- Publication place: United States
- Media type: Print (hardback)
- Pages: 200
- ISBN: 978-0876852040

The Hungry Ghosts: Seven Allusive Comedies is a collection of short stories written by Joyce Carol Oates. It was published in 1974 by Black Sparrow Press.

Just like her collections Marriages and Infidelities (1972) and The Goddess and Other Women (1974), this one is also thematically unified as it focuses on characters from the academic and literary world. Yet contrary to Oates's previous short stories, which all treated their themes with great seriousness, the stories in The Hungry Ghosts surprise the reader as satires.

The satirical intent and implied criticism of the book is not only revealed by the epigraphs taken from Swift's The Battle of the Books - "Satire is a sort of Glass, wherein Beholders do generally discover everybody's Face but their Own" - and Fielding's Tom Jones - "Surely a man may speak truth with a smiling countenance" - but also by the title itself. On one of the front pages Oates explains: "A preta (ghost) is one who, in the ancient Buddhist cosmology, haunts the earth's surface, continually driven by hunger - that is, desire of one kind or another" (p. 6). In a letter to the editor of the New York Times Book Review she further comments:

In the ancient Buddhist cosmology, according to tradition, a "preta" (ghost) is a creature driven ceaselessly by hunger - that is, desires of one kind or another. He is insatiable, no matter how much he devours. Like many people (intellectuals not excluded) he is in a constant state of anxious striving. In writing about the academic and literary world, I wanted only to illustrate from the inside, so to speak, how ambition, lust for fame and prestige, and egotism, can rule the lives of presumably intelligent people.

In Marriages and Infidelities Oates explicitly alludes to novellas and short stories by earlier writers, making use of either their titles or their themes and adapting them in accordance with her artistic intentions. In The Hungry Ghosts, she plays with the titles of famous political, philosophical, and religious works: Alexis de Tocqueville's Democracy in America, John Bunyan's Pilgrim's Progress, Booker T. Washington's Up From a Slavery, William Blake's A Descriptive Catalogue, and Friedrich Nietzsche's The Birth of Tragedy. But while the stories in Marriages and Infidelities were meant to be "testaments of her love and extreme devotion to these other writers" and their titles used without any satirical intentions, the literary allusions in The Hungry Ghosts serve entirely different purposes, as Eileen Bender points out:

Unlike the authors who haunt her previous literary "marriages," these allusive influences serve only to minimize the pathetic personae: shams, drones, falsifiers, men and women whose only mode of identity is unwitting parody or desperate plagiarism, whose "art" is hackwork, whose "social conscience" is a fraudulent pose, whose criticism is reductive and pedantic. The collection is thus a punning, savage attack on the "influence" peddlers who masquerade as mentors and curators.

This thesis is further supported by the fact that two of the stories - "Pilgrims' Progress" and "Up From Slavery" - were originally published as "Saul Bird Says: Relate! Communicate! Liberate!" and "The Loves of Franklin Ambrose" and later received their ironic and allusive titles.

== Stories ==
Those stories first appearing in literary journals are indicated.

- "Democracy in America" (Shenandoah, Spring 1973)
- "Pilgrims' Progress" (Playboy, October 1970, as "Saul Bird Says: Relate! Communicate" Liberate!")
- "Up From Slavery" (Playboy, January 1972, as "The Loves of Franklin Ambrose")
- "A Descriptive Catalogue" (Carolina Quarterly, Fall 1973)
- "The Birth of Tragedy" (Exile, Spring 1974)
- "Rewards of Fame"
- "Angst" (Windsor Review, Fall–Winter 1974)

== The Seven Allusive Comedies ==
=== "Democracy in America" ===
The first story of the collection focuses on its protagonist's efforts to retrieve his manuscript in the dirty and chaotic apartment of the university press copy-editor who has been found dead there. Ronald Pauli explains the existential importance of the manuscript to Mrs. Novak, who opens the copy-editor's room for him:

"My life seems so haphazard. Having my book accepted by the Press was the one certain thing, the only reality ... and Dr. Mercer said he was sure I'd be kept on, he was sure the Department's executive committee would be impressed with it, my having a book accepted. It means so much to me." (pp.19-20)

The accidents which lead to Ronald Pauli's desperate search for his manuscript - first the theft of his valise with the carbon copy in it, then the death of the copy-editor who is in possession of the manuscript, finally the dirt and chaos of the copyeditor's apartment - add up to a satire of American society, to a nightmare vision of its unlimited possibilities. It is part of the title's irony that in a nation in which every kind of career is supposed to be possible, every kind of defeat is possible, too. Not only does Ronald Pauli's book deal with de Tocqueville's Democracy in America, but his motives for writing it reveal that he is a representative of basic American ideals as well. When he comes across pages from other manuscripts during his search, he wonders "if they belonged to other young men, like himself, who were anxious to do well ... rivals who were not in this room to compete with him, but whose invisible forms swayed and lunged around him" (p. 22). The aspect of competition as one motive for his work is also alluded to in some lines he reads on a page from another manuscript:

The love of wealth is therefore to be traced, either as a principal or an accessory motive, at the bottom of all the Americans do: this gives to their passions a sort of family likeness, and soon renders the survey of them exceedingly wearisome. (p.27)

The existential importance of the book is again emphasized at the end of the story when he has finally found all its pages:

All these pages were his. He tried not to notice the rips and dog eared corners and the stains and smears of dust and dirt. Someone had tried to destroy him, but had not succeeded. His manuscript was crumpled, torn, stained with the dirt of a total stranger, but it had not been destroyed. And he had not been destroyed. "I'm still living," Ronald whispered. (p.29)

Thus, the story on the one hand shows "how much of an academic's identity is sometimes invested in the belabored prose of these scholarly efforts." Yet Oates points out that these "scholarly efforts" are by no means based on altruistic motives alone, on thirst for knowledge and a fundamental interest in scholarly research and scientific progress, but on very common motives as well, that competition and the love of wealth and prestige are part of the academic world just as much as they are part of American society.

=== "Pilgrims' Progress" ===
"Pilgrims' Progress" is the first story which is set at a fictitious little university in southern Ontario, Hilberry, which will serve as background for several other stories in The Hungry Ghosts and Crossing the Border. It focuses on the fatal development of Wanda Barnett and Erasmus Hubben, two Hilberry lecturers who become disciples of the charismatic leader figure of Saul Bird and are almost destroyed by him.

When Wanda Barnett meets Saul Bird for the first time she is at once fascinated by him. She notices that he talks "theatrically, elegantly," that his voice is "wonderfully energetic" and "wound about her like fine ribbon" (p. 33), and that "his blond hair seemed to vibrate with electricity" (p. 35). Saul Bird recognizes a character's weakness intuitively, he knows how to confuse and to manipulate him. This is demonstrated when he tells Wanda that he has been fired and immediately afterwards asks her why she looks so surprised. His eloquence and Wanda's inability to resist him are also revealed when he asks her to have dinner with him and his friends and she is unable to decline the invitation (p. 39).

While the first two parts of the story serve to introduce Wanda Barnett, Saul Bird, and his wife, the third part focuses on Erasmus Hubben and the way he is manipulated by Bird. Erasmus thinks that it is best to stay away from people, and so he keeps both his colleagues and his students at a distance. This is the main reason why his teaching is not successful, although he always prepares for his classes very carefully; but Erasmus cannot understand why the students do not appreciate his lectures. Thus, his teaching is his weak point, and Saul Bird knows how to take advantage of this.

At first only one of Bird's disciples comes to Erasmus's lectures, but merely in order to confuse him by sitting in class with his arms folded, his face taut and contemptuous, which indeed has the desired effect. Erasmus realizes that more and more of Bird's students attend his classes. They either sit there with their arms folded, demonstrating that they are obviously bored by his lectures; or one of them takes notes furiously, and Erasmus's growing confusion is disclosed when he wonders whether these notes are going to be used against him. All this has served to prepare him for Bird, who one day comes into his office and asks him to sign a petition in his behalf. Erasmus refuses to sign it, and Bird again reveals his eloquence and cleverness when he uses a simple bluff to persuade him:

Hubben was extremely warm. "I'm not sure ..."

"Most of your colleagues in Philosophy are going to sign in my behalf," Saul Bird said.

"What is your decision?"

"I wasn't aware that most of them were ..."

"Of course not. People are afraid to talk openly of these matters." (p. 44)

Erasmus finally even surrenders to Bird's invitation to dinner, which links his fate to Wanda Barnett's, who has been invited to the same dinner. While the first three parts of the story have a merely expository function and serve to introduce its main characters, the other four sections deal with Wanda's and Erasmus's gradual transformation and their fatal development under the influence of Saul Bird. After the first dinner with the Birds "Wanda came as often as she could" to the meetings of "the group" at Saul Bird's apartment. She is fascinated by them and thinks that they are "so passionate ... so wise" (p. 45). Erasmus Hubben is also "transformed gradually". He comes to Saul Bird's apartment "more and more often, he stayed later, he became quite dependent upon these nightly meetings" (p. 46). Erasmus and Wanda fall a prey to the bewildering atmosphere of the group's meetings. Saul Bird practices a vulgar-psychological kind of group therapy and self-realization, and Oates discloses the clichés of their conversations and Erasmus's and Wanda's naivety when she gives an example of the "intense, intoxicating dialogue" of the group:

Saul Bird: What conclusion have you come to?

Doris: That I was an infant. I was enslaved.

Saul Bird: And what now?

Doris: Now I am totally free.

Saul Bird: You're exaggerating to gain our respect.

Doris: No, I'm free. I'm free. I detest my parents and everything they stand for - I'm free of them - I am my own woman, entirely! (p.48)

But Saul Bird is not at all interested in the liberation of his disciples, on the contrary he is interested in nothing but his own personal advantage. His students are attracted by the fact that he does not teach his classes formally and that they are allowed to grade themselves at the end of the year, which is the reason why he has been fired for "incompetence and 'gross misconduct'" (p. 45). When it turns out that he has negotiated with other universities while his disciples have fought for the renewal of his contract with Hilberry University, his cleverness and selfishness are totally revealed and underscored by his son's explanation that "this has happened before" (p. 59).

Saul Bird leaves behind two destroyed characters. Erasmus Hubben is hospitalized after his breakdown during the occupation of the Humanities Building; Wanda Barnett is without a job, as she has resigned from the university in order to protest against the non-renewal of Saul Bird's contract. The story's ending thus brings to notice the irony of its title: Erasmus and Wanda have both been misled by a false preacher, their "progress" manifests itself as a diminution of their personalities.

=== "Up From Slavery" ===
Ironically referring to Booker T. Washington's autobiography, this story's title hints at the fact that it is mainly concerned with a Black who has succeeded in a world dominated by Whites, in this case the academic one.

Franklin Ambrose denies his racial background and constantly tries to adopt a white personality by acquiring the status symbols of the white upper middle-class establishment. Oates's descriptions of his mannerisms are satirical highlights of this volume: his white MG roadster, his Cardin shirts, the expensive silk ties and ascots, the "suits whose notched and peaked lapels expanded and narrowed according to fashion laws totally unknown to Frank's mundane, hard-working colleagues at the University" (p. 63). He is the only Harvard Ph.D. and the only Negro in the English Department of Hilberry University, and he has come to this place because he suspected that there would be few Negroes at this university. Yet he is by no means an outsider, on the contrary, he is the department's most popular professor, as he is cheerful most of the time and "hastened to put all white people at their ease, immediately, by emphasizing the scorn he felt for anything 'black' (he hated that modish word; he preferred the more sanitary and middle-class 'Negro')" (p. 63).

But after a few years at Hilberry, Franklin begins to feel dissatisfied with his job and his marriage. Thus, he has a few affairs with white girl students which help him to overcome his melancholic moods and his doubts of his manhood. When a very pretty young female instructor applies for a job at Hilberry, he succeeds in having her hired although the other members of the Appointments and Promotion Committee are shocked by her flamboyant way of dressing and her overt feminist statements. After she has got the job, Franklin is eager to help her in every respect, yet he is confused by the fact that she does not want to have an affair with him. When she finally even spoils his carefully planned effort to seduce her and reminds him of the similar history of Blacks and women, of the fact that they have both "been treated like dirt by the white male Establishment" (p. 71), Franklin reveals both his unwillingness to face his racial heritage and his male sexism: "'Well, we didn't get together tonight to talk about that kind of stuff,' he said hotly ..., 'there's anything I hate it's a woman who talks too much ...'" (p. 71).

She has made the two worst mistakes: she has hurt his manhood and has directly referred to his racial background. Franklin never speaks to her again, and after a few weeks he takes revenge on her. He denounces her at the Head of the Department, giving misinformation about her teaching and her research work, and as a result of this her contract is not renewed for the following year. The story succeeds as a satire of a Black who has succeeded in the academic world and a male chauvinist; from a feminist point of view it can definitely be interpreted as an impressive example of female oppression in a world dominated by males.

=== "A Descriptive Catalogue" ===
"A Descriptive Catalogue" deals with one of the crucial problems of the academic world, the importance which is put on the sheer quantity of a scholar's publications and the resulting pressure of publish-or-perish. But the story also reveals the secret animosities between faculty members and the politics of faculty meetings which are dominated by personal feelings.

The fact that "the initial event was certainly an accident" and that "it began with an eerie casualness" (p. 79) hints at the hidden tensions in the English Department of Hilberry University: Reynold Mason misunderstands the common laughter of his colleague Ron Blass and a student, when he fortuitously steps into Ron's office. From this moment he shows his hostility towards Ron Blass openly, and obviously there has always been a certain animosity on Mason's part. Contrary to him, Ron Blass is popular with the students and most of his colleagues, and although they joined Hilberry's staff at the same time and Mason had a higher qualification, Ron Blass has been promoted to the tenured rank of Assistant Professor ahead of him (p. 83), because he is the department's "poet," whom no one else can approach "in terms of sheer quantity of publications" (p. 82). Again Oates reveals her satirical vein when she sums up his achievements and the way they are presented:

Ron was the most frequently-published member of the Department: a mimeographed newsletter was brought out each month, and the column that dealt with publications was always dominated by Ron's bibliography. He listed poems by their full titles, which were sometimes rather long, and he sometimes spaced these titles in his paragraph so that it was necessary to repeat the name of the magazine in which they appeared; if he did book reviews for the local newspaper, he was careful to give the full title and the name of the author of the book reviewed; he listed the readings he did at the local pub, which had poetry readings open to everyone on Friday evenings, and since he had a ten-minute program on the university's radio station each Saturday morning, he was careful to give the name of his talk. But he really did publish poetry widely - in little-known magazines like Sink, Scorpion, The Ork Review, Druids Choice, and Rejects. He was personally modest about being so prolific, but always included in the biographical information that accompanied his poems an exact count of his publications up to that time: he had begun this semester with a record of 358 poems published in 53 magazines or newspapers in Canada, the United States, England, Wales, and Australia. (pp.81-82)

The story's title is an ironic allusion to Ron's "descriptive catalogue" of his publications, but it also refers to the only two essays Reynold Mason has published so far, which both dealt with William Blake's A Descriptive Catalogue of Pictures, Poetical and Historical Inventions (1809). Thus, Ron Blass is sure that Mason is simply jealous of him (p. 82), but he is nonetheless surprised when Mason accuses him of "willful and gross plagiarism, possibly criminal plagiarism" (pp. 84–85) during a department meeting which takes place a full two months after the unfortunate misunderstanding.

The meetings of the committee which has to investigate Mason's accusations satirically depict the politics of faculty meetings and the motives which dominate them. All members cherish some kind of antipathy against each other, and Oates gives a detailed account of the reasons for the mutual aversions: the fight for a more spacious office; the contempt of younger colleagues; a disagreement about a footnote in one scholar's publication, as a result of which the two opponents never speak to each other again and only communicate through memos and formal letters; finally the firm belief that one's own area of specialization is superior to any other (pp. 87–89).

Specialization is one of the main sources of satire in the second half of the story. When Reynold Mason points out that one of Ron's poems contains outright borrowings from a poem written in 1941 by the Canadian poet Samuel Gregory, he is interrupted by the Victorian Age specialist who objects that the source is really an early poem by Hopkins. Both men back their theses with quotations, but the ironic climax of this episode is reached when the Renaissance specialist disagrees with both of them and points out that the root of this "entire tradition" (p. 91) is in reality a play by Sturgess. The whole incident indicates how ridiculous Mason's accusations are, but it also mocks academic specialization and the custom to investigate literary allusions and parallels as an end in itself.

Nonetheless, Ron Blass has to defend himself against Mason's accusations. His helpless explanation reveals his motives for writing the poems as well as the social and economic pressure which results from the merely quantitative measuring of a scholar's publications:

"... Dr. Barth was so nice to me, and I wanted to make him proud of me ... I wanted the department to be proud of me ... but ... but I ... just discovered, one day I discovered ... that I ... I had nothing to say. I had nothing to say any more. We bought such a nice house, and ... I love it here at Hilberry ... and I wanted you all to be proud of me ... Dr. Barth ... and all of you ... I wanted you to be proud and, and happy that you had a poet ... the other universities have poets ... but Hilberry didn't ... and ... and you hired me to be a poet ... and there was so much pressure to publish ... things ... to publish things ... it could be anything, I thought because ... nobody reads it ... I mean ... nobody seems to read it." (p.94)

After Ron's helpless confession the reader expects that the committee will vote for his dismissal unanimously. Yet Oates gives the story another ironic turn: on the final meeting only Reynold Mason votes for his dismissal, as Ron has informed the other members of the committee about the legal consequences of charging a person with plagiarism. First of all "plagiarism" is a legal term and never provable, and secondly - according to Canadian law - a person accused of plagiarism might sue for slander (p. 99). Thus, Ron's retention at Hilberry only results from his colleagues' fears of a possible slander suit and a further extension of the scandal.

=== "The Birth of Tragedy" ===
"The Birth of Tragedy" focuses on the humiliating experiences of a young graduate student who is hired by Hilberry University as a teaching assistant for Dr. Thayer, the Renaissance specialist.

Barry Sommers comes to Hilberry because all other universities have turned down his applications. He is so grateful for the job that he is "prepared to love it ... he was prepared to love even Dr. Thayer, unfriendly and unfashionable as Thayer appeared" (p. 107). He does everything to please Thayer, who gradually becomes more friendly and sometimes even talks with Barry about private affairs. One day Thayer warns him against the secret dangers of the academic world, and his words not only apply to this story, but to the other ones in this volume as well:

"It's a very complex, sinister world here - but of course exhilarating, if you don't weaken. It's like a Shakespearean play - without the fifth act. The fourth act just goes on and on, scenes of high tragedy alternate with scenes of the most contemptible, gross comedy ... this world is all drama. As long as you know that and realize that other people are feverishly writing scenarios in order to trap you in them, you'll survive." (pp.112-113)

Barry is surprised when Thayer asks him to give his first lecture much sooner than he had expected, so that he has only four days to prepare it; and he is therefore grateful when Thayer offers his help and invites him to his apartment. He is extremely nervous when he comes to Thayer's apartment on the evening before his lecture. Thayer is completely changed, which is satirically indicated by his clothing: while he only wears old-fashioned, dark suits at the university (p. 107), he now wears "an outfit Barry had never seen before, a monogrammed lemon-green shirt and navy blue trousers cut trimly at the knee and flaring out at the ankle, and calfskin boots with square, raised heels" (pp. 116–117). Barry is surprised at his "exuberance and his generous, unforced conversation" (p. 116), and he is more and more confused as Thayer is obviously not at all interested in talking about Barry's lecture, but considers this "an evening to celebrate," and even casually remarks that he has all the notes for the lecture in his filing cabinet at school (p. 118).

Thayer is gradually getting drunk and begins to intersperse the conversation with lines from Shakespeare. His quotations from Shakespeare's sonnets reveal Thayer's homosexual desire for Barry. First Thayer quotes some lines from sonnet 27 - "Weary with toil, I haste me to my bed ... but then begins, ah yes begins, begins a journey in my head ... for then my thoughts, from far where I abide ... intend a zealous pilgrimage to thee ..." (pp. 119–120) - which serve to introduce the subject of love; then he recites sonnet 20 in full, which clearly hints at his homosexual inclinations.

Barry realizes Thayer's intentions, he wants to leave, but Thayer does not let him go, and his accusation that Barry's behavior is "in total violation of the evening's scenario" (p. 121) reveals that he planned the situation carefully. Barry's situation is absolutely hopeless, especially as Thayer has maliciously told him that the Ph.D. program will be dropped for financial reasons (p. 122). But he is determined to deliver his lecture; he hopes that Thayer might change his mind or will not remember the events of the evening.

Surprisingly Barry changes the subject of his lecture after a few minutes and begins to develop his own private theory of tragedy in a remarkably articulate and self-confident way. Backing his theses with numerous references to Hamlet, he explains to the class that tragedy is "all about wanting to be free", that "Hamlet and the others, they had wanted to be free ... but everybody held them down, a lot of old dying bastards held them down ... and it was still going on ..." (pp. 128–129). Yet the most important message of Hamlet and of all other tragedies lies in some of Hamlet's last words, which he therefore reads to the class: "'You that look pale and tremble at this chance, that are but mutes or audience to this act, had I but time - oh I could tell you - but let it be - I am dead, thou livest'" (p. 129)

These lines contain ironic references to Barry's situation: he speaks to a silent and bewildered audience, to which he cannot explain his personal tragedy; and the metaphor "dead" refers to his career as a teaching assistant at Hilberry, as Thayer is recording his lecture and will certainly use it against him. Therefore, the story's title - a borrowing from Nietzsche – is an ironic comment on both Barry's rather limited theory of tragedy and his personal situation.

=== "Rewards of Fame" ===
"Rewards of Fame" is a satirical account of one day of Murray Licht's annual spring poetry-reading tour. The story is not concerned with any extraordinary event, it charts the daily routine of these tours and is representative of any other day or reading tour as well: the arrival at the small, Midwestern college, the luncheon in Murray Licht's honor, a brief, guided tour of the college, a discussion with students, a visit to the university bookstore, the actual reading, a banquet, and finally a panel discussion with three other well-known poets who are present because it is the college's annual "Poetry Week".

The chronology of these events is interspersed with Murry Licht's reflections of his past, the present situation, and his plans for the future. Oates reveals his view of himself - "a shambling entertaining failure" (p. 140) - as well as his contempt of the other three poets: the one he half-way respects is "an old friend-enemy" (p. 138), whom he nonetheless considers as being "actually insane" (p. 139), while the other two are nothing but "a shouter, a journalist-in-verse" (p. 139) and a "showman-maniac" (p. 142) to him. His background and his motives for this tour also exemplify Oates's satirical vein:

It was just not Murry Licht's fate to be financially secure, but always to be broke, in debt, driven across the United States each spring and fall, reading his work anywhere they would have him. He needed all the money he could get. He had several ex-wives, a number of children, so many bills, $ 2300 owed in back taxes, not to mention the bewildering bill for $ 4000 for this year alone, from the child psychiatrist his 13-year-old went to three times a week ... not to mention the terrible terms of his divorce settlement with Tanya, ages ago, when he'd been desperate to be free to marry pouty unpredictable Helga, alimony payments that would last as long as he existed. (p.153)

His depressive mood is only temporarily improved when one of the other poets calls him "the last, the very last, of the famous poets" (p. 173) during the panel discussion. While he had got completely drunk on the evening before and had slept fully-clothed, with his shoes on, on the carpet of his hotel room (p. 138), he gets high on his friend-enemy's cocaine this evening; and when he wakes up next morning, "fully-clothed, his shoes still on, lying sideways on a bed somewhere" (pp. 176–177), the circular structure of the story suggests that both his reading tour and his life will continue in a similar, recurrent way.

=== "Angst" ===
In the final story of the collection, "Angst," a middle-aged female novelist, Bernadine Donovan, visits an MLA convention in Chicago and attends a session devoted to her own fiction registered under a pseudonym.

Although "she had been warned, and it should not have alarmed her to see so many intoxicated people - alcohol, drugs? - " (p. 181), she is confused by the atmosphere of the convention. It appears strangely unreal to her, which is also indicated when she reflects that "if this were a novella of hers she could certainly shape it into a coherent and meaningful, though 'ironic' experience" (p. 189). It is just as ironic that she is not recognized at the session devoted to her fiction, and the whole panel discussion is a masterpiece of satire which could only be written by someone who knows the academic and literary world at first-hand.

The first paper which is read deals with the influence of Virginia Woolf's style on Bernadine Donovan. Juxtaposing paragraphs from The Years with paragraphs from her latest novel, the author argues that "she could be considered a development of Woolf rather than an independent artist" (p. 196). Bernadine Donovan thinks that this is simply "absurd," as she has not read The Years since the age of eighteen (p. 197). The author of the second paper comes to the conclusion that her novels' "real messages were in each case antithetical to what was stated" (p. 197), which is just as absurd as the first paper; while the third paper states that her latest novel had not been modeled upon The Years, but upon the first three books of Gulliver's Travels (p. 198).

Suddenly the session is interrupted by a mad-woman who shouts that she is Bernadine Donovan, tells them to stop telling lies about her and then disappears. After this incident nobody listens to the paper any more, all participants are so delighted at the scandal that they leave the room, discussing whether it really was Bernadine Donovan or not; while the real Donovan stays behind, shocked and unable to reveal herself to them.

Just as in "A Descriptive Catalogue," Oates again mocks the academic habit to publish essays and books for economic reasons and out of lust for fame and prestige, which is disclosed by the complaints of the woman who read the third paper:

"It isn't fair! A thing like this! Interrupting my paper! This was my only chance - my last chance - I demand financial restitution - I won't accept this, do you hear! Costing me hundreds and hundreds of dollars, this dreadful convention - this Donovan thing was my ace in the hole ..." (p.199)

Yet in "Rewards of Fame" Oates pointed out that the same holds true for certain members of the literary scene, as Murray Licht was more concerned about money and fame than about the quality of his poetry. Therefore, both stories exemplify the intention Oates phrased explicitly: that in writing about the academic and literary world, she "wanted only to illustrate from the inside, so to speak, how ambition, lust for fame and prestige, and egotism, can rule the lives of presumably intelligent people."

== Reception ==
The reception of this collection is very mixed. Josephine Hendin states that "the satire and self-satire in these stories is sour, personal, grim," and that the stories "invariably expose ... Joyce Carol Oates's raw spleen," while Hermann Severin points out that she has been an integral part of both the academic and the literary world for years, and that one can assume that the stories contain autobiographical elements. But "in all of these satires Oates is never vicious when she attacks the weaknesses of the academic and literary world. ... Yet the most interesting fact conveyed by this collection is that Oates can be funny if she wants to be, ... that she possesses a sense of humor and the ability to write in a lighter vein, too."

== Sources ==
- Johnson, Greg. 1994. Joyce Carol Oates: A Study of the Short Fiction. Twayne's studies in short fiction; no. 57. Twayne Publishers, New York. ISBN 0-8057-0857-X
- Lercangee, Francine. 1986. Joyce Carol Oates: An Annotated Bibliography. Garland Publishing, New York and London. ISBN 0-8240-8908-1
- Oates, Joyce Carol. 1974. The Hungry Ghosts: Seven Allusive Comedies. Black Sparrow Press, Los Angeles. ISBN 978-0876852040
