= Paradox (Irish band) =

Irish rock band

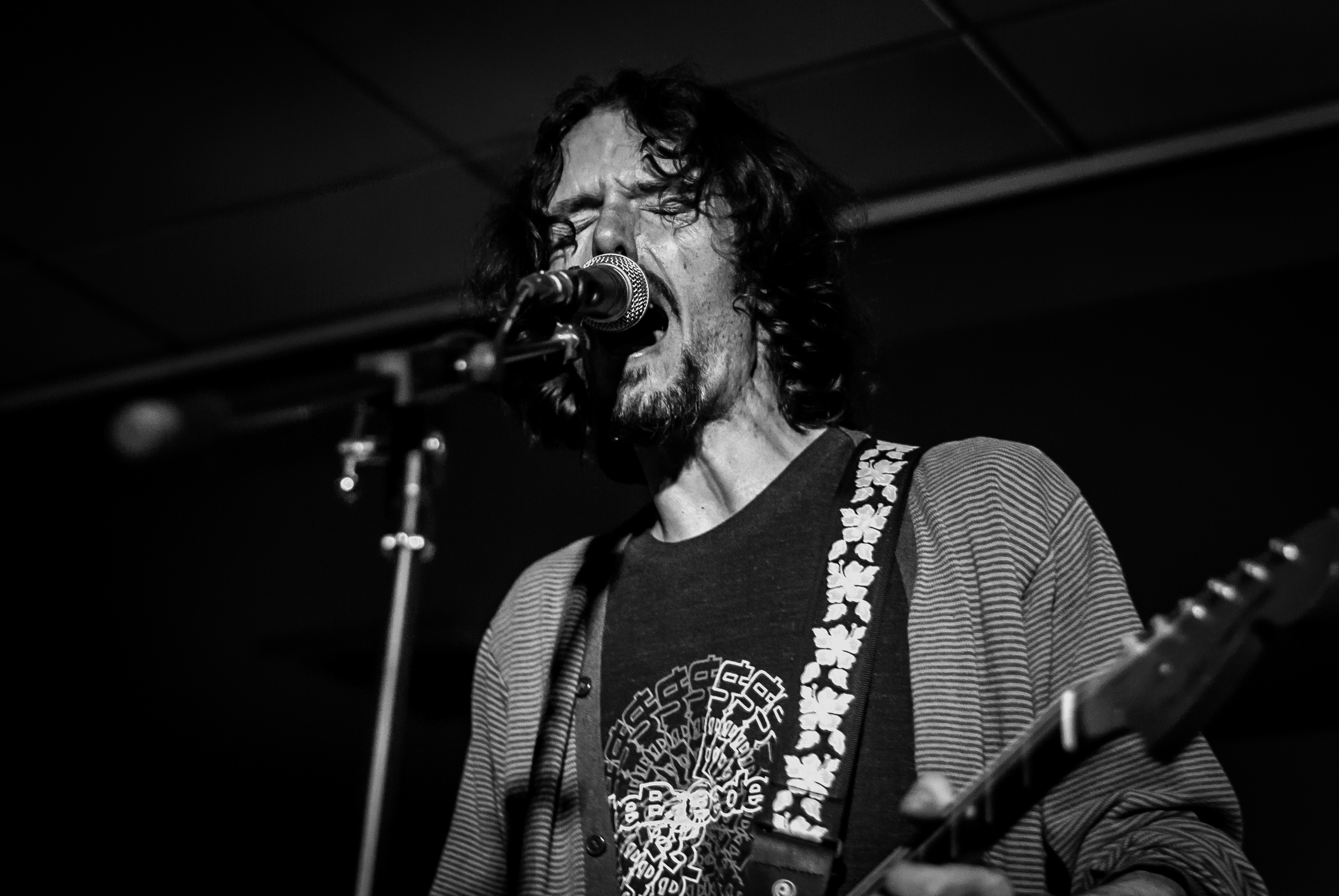
- Pete Mac of Paradox performing live

Background information
- Origin: Cork, Ireland
- Genres: Alternative rock, grunge, garage rock
- Years active: 1996–present
- Members: Pete Mac; Kieran O'Neill; Jette Pille
- Website: paradoxrock.com

Paradox are an Irish grunge band formed in Cork in 1996 by brothers Pete and Mike Mac. They released their debut album, Circle of Growth in 2002 and have released four albums to date, the latest release was Chapters (2015). Guitarist and vocalist Pete Mac also recorded and released two solo albums, 'In Limbo' in 2009 and 'Hiber Nation' in 2023.

== History ==
=== 1996–2002: Circle of Growth ===
After forming in 1996, Paradox spent the next few years fine-tuning their sound by recording several demos and playing the local circuit. In 2000 Paradox caught the attention of a California-based independent label and in December of that year they flew out to LA to record their debut album. Circle of Growth was recorded at Master Groove Studios in the Valley. The album was self-produced and also saw Pete and Mike playing all the instruments. Circle of Growth was released in September 2002.
Circle of Growth has a raw sound and shows the band's musical influences, exhibiting elements of grunge, punk and garage rock. Reviews of the album compared it to Nirvana's Bleach and to bands like Alice in Chains and Soundgarden. Mike admitted the band's early influence: "The Seattle scene definitely impressed us, it was a big influence on the band."
An independent video was made for the album's only single, Infinite. The video, shot in the Nevada desert, was played on many TV stations in the US. The song was also played prominently on many college radio stations as well as major Irish stations such as Red FM and Cork's 96FM.
During this time, Paradox continued to play gigs across their home country of Ireland; this included a performance at Sir Henry's in Cork. The band also headlined the IMRO Showcase Tour in 2001.
In 2002, Paradox returned to the US. They played many venues, including the Battle of Bands Music Festival in Las Vegas, where, with almost 300 bands taking part, Paradox got through to the final and achieved third place in the competition. They were featured in many newspapers and magazines in Ireland, including Hot Press.

=== 2003–2006: Sacred ===
Following the band's US tour they parted ways with their label. In January 2003 Paradox recorded six new songs at BPM Studios in Cork, Ireland. These tracks were initially released on The Sacred EP.
A year later, Paradox returned to BPM Studios and recorded a further six songs. The 12 songs in total were then released as the band's second album, Sacred, on 11 May 2004. As with Circle of Growth, Pete and Mike played all the instruments: Pete on vocals, guitars and bass; Mike on Drums, vocal harmonies, keyboards and piano.
Sacred marked a significant change for the band, moving away from the grunge/punk sound found on Circle of Growth to a more melodic alternative rock sound.
Sacred received very positive feedback from fans as well as great reviews from online fanzines and radio stations. One review commented "The core of Paradox's sound is driven with passion and is reminiscent of the grunge/hard rock styles prevalent in middle America. The lyrics are quite insightful and are obviously something these gentleman put a lot of their heart and soul into. Pretend Friend, one of my favourites, displays their appreciation for the musical content of a song with their use of harmonies and a meaningful topic." Another article added: "(Sacred) is an album of surprising maturity for such a young act – and a healthy spring board to success."
That year, Pete moved to London and Mike moved to Canada, meaning Paradox were initially unable to tour to promote the album's release. And, not for the first time, Paradox found themselves without a bass player. In 2005 Pete and Mike returned to Ireland and, joined by bass player Jon Finn, they were able to play some live shows, starting with a performance for Pulse Radio in Dublin.
Pete then moved to Berlin, Germany and Paradox were soon playing shows across the country, including a few outdoor music festivals. Their debut show in Germany took place on 28 December 2006 at Rock at Sage, Sage Club, Berlin.

=== 2008–2009: In Limbo ===
By 2008, many new songs had been written and were waiting to be recorded. Instead of going to a traditional recording studio, Pete recorded at home using a 4-track, two microphones, an acoustic guitar, bass and tambourine. Half of the album was recorded in his apartment in Berlin, while other songs were recorded in a bathroom. Added to these were three demos that were recorded on an old analogue 4-track in Ireland in 2005. Making the album took six months in total.
The 12 songs were released as the album, In Limbo, in February 2009. Technically a Pete Mac acoustic solo album, In Limbo had a very different sound to the earlier Paradox albums. This new sound was well received by Paradox fans as well as helping to attract new listeners. The album received mostly positive reviews. The Grunge fanzine Minerva Corner in Portugal summed up the album as follows: "In Limbo is a simple / acoustic and direct album with some twists of electric guitar, nothing more added. It's natural and emotional as an intimite album should be... Nothing artificial, no masks, simply true!"
Pete made videos for two of the album's songs, No Words and Pretend Friend. Pete played many solo acoustic shows in Berlin throughout 2009. As well as playing songs from In Limbo and acoustic versions of Paradox songs, he played covers of songs that helped inspire the In Limbo sound, such as Eddie Vedder's Society.

=== 2010–2013: Corporate Pollution ===
In 2010 Pete and Mike got back together to rehearse material that had been written over the past five years, preparing for the band's first album since Sacred in 2004. Meanwhile, 'Downward Spiral', a track from Sacred, received a certificate award from the IAIRA (International Association of Independent Recording Artists). The track reached No. 4 in the international internet Top 10.
The first Paradox UK tour was planned for July with 16 dates initially booked. After much confusion with the booking agency the plug got pulled on the whole tour just 3 weeks before it was meant to start. The band continued to pursue the tour themselves and managed to salvage 8 dates.
The band recruited new bass player Jette Pille and began touring the UK. On their return to Ireland, they resumed rehearsals and then went to a secluded recording studio in County Kerry to work on the new album.
Eleven songs were mixed in nine days at Data Recording Studios and these became the band's third album, Corporate Pollution, released on 15 March 2011. As with Circle of Growth and Sacred, Pete and Mike played all the instruments on the album. They also co-produced the album.
Three of the songs on Corporate Pollution previously appeared on In Limbo but were re-recorded with a full band sound.

Corporate Pollution marks a further evolution in the Paradox sound: on average six electric guitars were recorded along with triple vocal harmonies, two acoustic guitars, much bass, piano for certain tracks, a female vocal for one track and two days of drumming.
One reviewer wrote that the album had "so many influences coming through here it's impossible to list them all. This music is timeless, solid and to the point." Another added: "Maybe the ultimate compliment you can pay to this album is that you could listen to it between Nirvana's In Utero and Alice in Chains' Dirt and it's every bit as good."
A video trailer for Corporate Pollution was made and was featured on websites such as NME.

The album's first single was Mr. Bureaucracy. The song, which has been played on radio stations such as Irish station 2fm, received attention for its biting political lyrics set against fast, grungy riffs. Loud-Stuff.com said: "Politically charged from the outset these guys sound like a hybrid of Nirvana and Bush with a heavier edge to the music."
Mr Bureaucracy earned the band more recognition after the release of a music video in late 2012, with the following year seeing the song nominated for 'Best Song' at the Berlin Music Video Awards, as well as receiving additional nominations at the Portobello Film Festival in London and the Dublin International Short Film and Music Festival. The song was also included on the Drop-d: Cork City Rock Vol.2 compilation album. 2012 also so the band tour alongside the likes of Therapy?, Kerbdog, and Shonen Knife.

In August 2011, shortly after Corporate Pollution's release, Paradox were nominated for the Arthur's Day – Play on the Day competition in conjunction with RTÉ 2fm and Hot Press.
In 2012 the Corporate Pollution track Repress Excess was used on the soundtrack for Canadian horror movie Truth.

=== 2014–2015: Chapters ===
In November 2014, Paradox unveiled a teaser video for a brand new single called Nothing Lasts. The song received its first radio airplay on 9 December on 'The Alternative with Dan Hegarty' on RTÉ 2fm and was released internationally on 12 December. The full music video was released on New Year's Eve. Chapters was released on 24 January 2015.

=== 2016–present ===
The band kicked off 2016 with a new single and music video titled EAT, which was nominated for awards at the Indie Cork Film Festival and the RATMA Film Festival in the UK.
2017 saw the release of the new single All Life Matters, an eagerly awaited follow-up to the band's last album Chapters. All Life Matters takes a similar direction to the previous Paradox album, which was also recorded at Wavefield, with the track criticising the current political climate. Singer Songwriter Pete Mac plays all instruments on the track with Brian Casey adding keys and piano. A music video for the track was released in 2018. The video takes a sarcastic, twisted view on social media and how today's society is influenced by information received through this form of media. The video won "Best Music Video" at the Disappear Here Film Festival in Donegal and was nominated at the Kerry Film Festival and the Indie Cork Film Festival 2018.
A follow-up single titled Here Comes The Pain was released in May 2019 with the band making a return to a heavier sound. The band followed this in early 2020 with another new single titled Welcome to the Happy Place.
The current line up of the band sees drummer Kieran O'Niell behind the kit.
2020 also saw Pete returning to his solo endeavors with the digital release of various cover versions (including songs by The Smashing Pumpkins, NIN and R.E.M.) and the release of his first original solo single in over 10 years titled Disappear.
In April 2021 Pete Mac released the single Escape, with additional vocals by Lisa Papineau. 2023 saw the release of his second full length solo album titled 'Hiber Nation'. Paradox returned in 2026 with the release of a new band single titled 'Narb'.

== Members ==
- Pete Mac – Lead vocals, lead guitar
- Kieran O'Neill – Drums, backing vocals
- Jette – Bass

== Discography ==
=== Albums ===
- 2002: Circle of Growth
- 2004: Sacred
- 2009: In Limbo
- 2011: Corporate Pollution
- 2015: Chapters
- 2023: Hiber Nation

=== Live albums ===
- 2023: Live at Wavefield

=== Singles ===
- 2001: Infinite
- 2003: Lame and Languid
- 2010: Mr. Bureaucracy
- 2014: Nothing Lasts
- 2015: Free as a Bird
- 2015: Eat
- 2017: All Life Matters
- 2019: Here Comes the Pain
- 2020: Welcome to the Happy Place
- 2020: Disappear
- 2021: Escape
- 2023: Voiceless
- 2026: Narb
