= En tu ausencia =

- Film poster
- Directed by: Iván Noel
- Written by: Iván Noel
- Starring: Francisco Alfonsín; Gonzalo Sánchez Salas; Ana Tutor
- Cinematography: Luis Fernández Caula; Ildefonso Corrochano
- Music by: Iván Noel
- Release date: 2008
- Running time: 99 minutes
- Country: Spain
- Language: Spanish
- Budget: $50,000

En tu ausencia (English: In Your Absence) is a 2008 Spanish drama film written and directed by Iván Noel.

== Plot ==
Pablo is a 13-year-old boy living in a small, tight-knit village in the Andalusian countryside of Southern Spain. He has recently lost his father in a tragic accident and his only friend is an older teenaged girl named Julia. One day, a mysterious, well-dressed man named Paco arrives in town and enters Pablo's life. Neglected by his mother after his father's recent death, Pablo forms a strong attachment to Paco, despite the warnings of the townspeople.

== Cast ==
| Actor | Role |
|---|---|
| Francisco Alfonsín | Paco |
| Pedro Salido Saborido | Adult Pablo |
| Gonzalo Sánchez Salas | Pablo |
| Anabel Azuar | Pablo's Mother |
| Ana Tutor | Julia |
| Antonio J. Atienza Sanchez | The Postman |
| Acensio Salas Suarez | The Mechanic |
| Juanjo Galiardo | Pablo's Father |
