= Sacred (Paradox album) =

Studio album by Paradox
- Released: 11 May 2004
- Recorded: BPM Studios, Ireland
- Genre: Alternative rock; garage rock; grunge
- Length: 58:39
- Label: Paradox
- Producer: Pete Mac, Mike Mac

Paradox chronology
Circle of Growth (2002)	Sacred (2004)	In Limbo (2009)

Sacred is the second album by Irish grunge band Paradox, released on May 11, 2004.

== Track listing ==
No.	Title	Length
1.	"Angel of Fate"	3:34
2.	"Destress"	6:41
3.	"Lame & Languid"	3:50
4.	"What You Were"	3:25
5.	"Sunburn Daze"	5:27
6.	"Spasm"	3:30
7.	"Pretend Friend"	3:43
8.	"Thorns of Rose"	3:29
9.	"Medication"	5:26
10.	"Apathy"	5:35
11.	"Downward Spiral"	5:58
12.	"Sacred"	7:36
Total length:		58:39

== Personnel ==
- Pete Mac – guitar, vocals, bass
- Mike Mac – drums, vocals
- Produced by Pete and Mike Mac
