= Circle of Growth =

Studio album by Paradox
- Released: September 2002
- Recorded: Master Groove Studios, LA
- Genres: Grunge; garage rock; alternative rock
- Length: 44:28
- Label: Jetspeed Records
- Producers: Pete Mac, Mike Mac

Paradox chronology
Circle of Growth (2002)	Sacred (2004)

Circle of Growth is the debut album by Irish grunge band Paradox.

== Track listing ==
No.	Title	Length
1.	"Black Flowers"	3:30
2.	"Cavelry"	4:10
3.	"Enamoured"	2:20
4.	"Infinite"	3:16
5.	"Noisy Feedback"	5:12
6.	"Stoner Girl"	3:30
7.	"P.A.E.L."	3:27
8.	"Idle Mind"	4:29
9.	"Candle Dirt"	3:15
10.	"Kernel (Circle Of Growth)"	3:28
11.	"Last One"	3:50
12.	"Shame for My Name"	4:26
Total length:		44:28

== Personnel ==
- Pete Mac – guitar, vocals, bass
- Mike Mac – drums, vocals
- Produced by Pete Mac and Mike Mac
