= Corporate Pollution =

Studio album by Paradox
- Released: 15 March 2011
- Studio: BPM Studios, Ireland
- Genre: Alternative rock; garage rock; grunge
- Length: 67:00
- Label: Paradox
- Producer: Pete Mac, Mike Mac

Paradox chronology
In Limbo (2009)	Corporate Pollution (2011)	Chapters (2015)

Corporate Pollution is the third album by Irish grunge band Paradox, released on March 15, 2011.

== Track listing ==
No.	Title	Length
1.	"Corporate Pollution"	4:21
2.	"Emptiness"	6:14
3.	"Mind Mud"	4:03
4.	"Living Demise"	5:31
5.	"Mr. Bureaucracy"	5:16
6.	"Bury The World"	6:16
7.	"Four Walls"	6:50
8.	"Repress Excess"	4:50
9.	"Shedding Skin"	7:42
10.	"Mitigate"	8:56
11.	"Serenity"	6:08
Total length:		66:02

== Personnel ==
- Pete Mac – guitar, vocals, bass
- Mike Mac – drums, vocals
- Produced by Pete Mac and Mike Mac
