= In Limbo (album) =

Studio album by Paradox
- Released: February 2009
- Genre: Acoustic
- Length: 60:01
- Label: Paradox
- Producer: Pete Mac

Paradox chronology
Sacred (2004)	In Limbo (2009)	Corporate Pollution (2011)

In Limbo is a solo acoustic album by Irish grunge band Paradox's Pete Mac. It was released in February 2009.

== Track listing ==
No.	Title	Length
1.	"Corporate Pollution"	6:19
2.	"Kindred"	4:13
3.	"Miles Behind"	3:31
4.	"Emptiness"	6:12
5.	"In Limbo"	4:07
6.	"No People Day"	5:57
7.	"Bury The World"	5:57
8.	"Addictive Desire"	3:20
9.	"No Words"	5:40
10.	"Bring Me Down"	4:17
11.	"Dream"	4:12
12.	"Serenity"	6:21
Total length:		60:01

== Personnel ==
- Pete Mac – guitar, vocals, bass, tambourine
- Produced by Pete Mac
