= Limbo (skating) =

Gymnastics skill on roller skates

Limbo skating or roller limbo is a sport in which a person travels on roller skates underneath an obstacle like a horizontal pole without touching it. In order to pass an obstacle with a very low height, advanced athletes spread their legs apart, if possible into a full split, and lean their upper body forward, with the face almost touching the ground. As with traditional limbo dance, several athletes may participate in a competition, in which a pole is lowered from round to round. Whoever touches the pole is out, until only one person remains as the winner.

In a variation, athletes try to skate under as many cars as possible. In the German show “Wetten dass” (“Let's bet”), a Chinese girl drove under a glass plate.

The sport was mentioned on the World Wide Web as early as 1998.

The Guinness Book of World Records lists several records related to limbo skating.
