= Iván Noel =

French-Argentine film director (1968–2021)

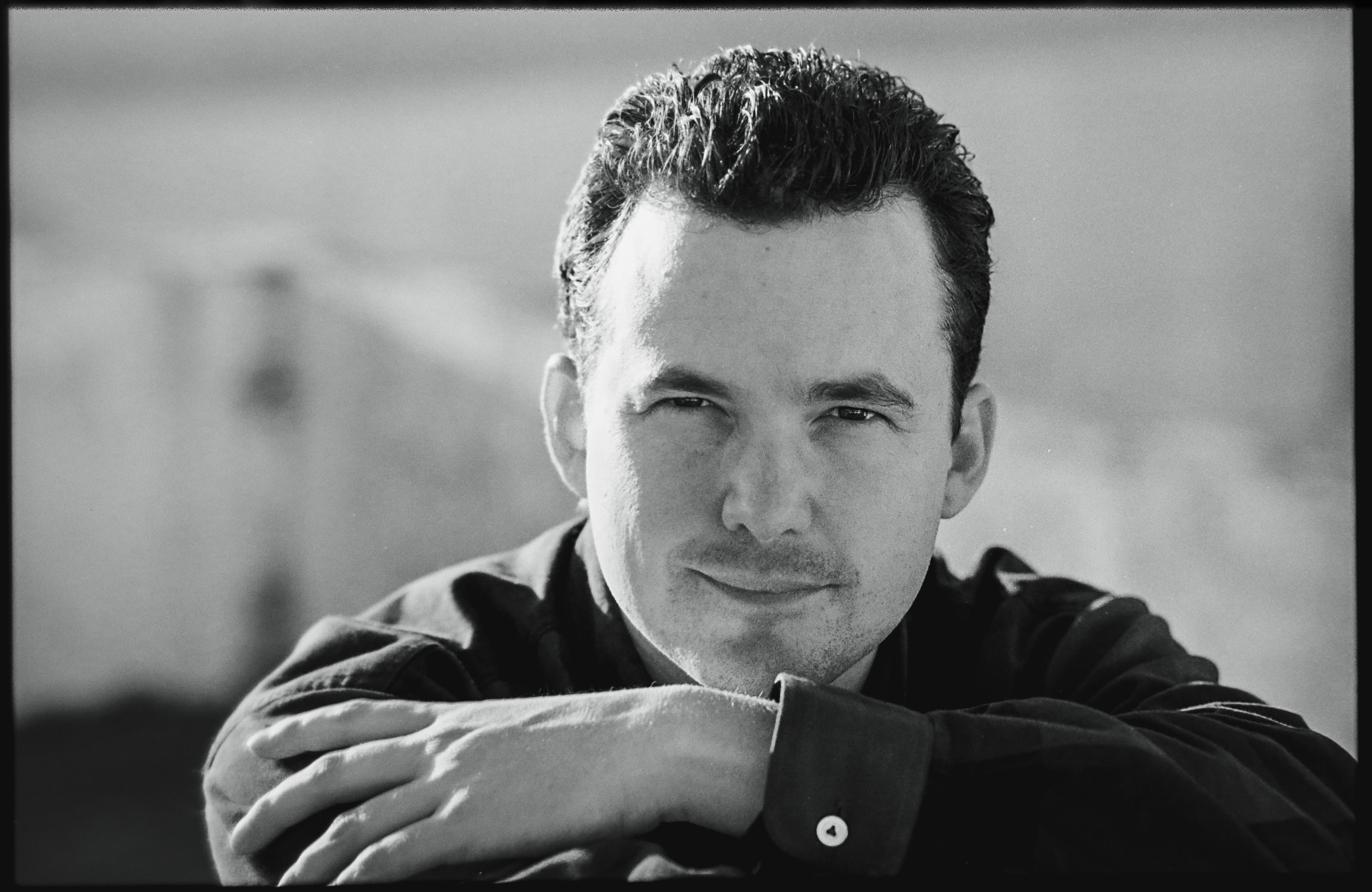
Yves Noël (Iván Noel) in 2002, Jerez de la Frontera, Spain.

Iván Noel (1968 – 19 July 2021) was a French-Argentine film director and producer, known for They Returned (2015), En tu Ausencia (2008) and ¡Primaria! (2010). He originally started in the arts by writing and performing his own musical compositions.

== Early life ==
Noel was born Yves Noel Couldrey in 1968 in Beirut. His mother was Australian and his father was of French and Egyptian-British descent. He was fluently trilingual. His family was well-to-do but "nomadic" resulting in his attending 8 different schools in as many countries.

He had a BA in music and education from the University of York, specializing in soundtrack composition, having studied amongst others with Wilfred Josephs, and began his career as professor in the field of music, composing and giving concerts as a solo classical guitarist and piano accompanist in Paris.

== Film making ==
Noel won awards for his photography (Best New Artists at the Petit Palais' Salon d'Automn' exhibitions, Paris), but also his compositions (finalist winner of the British Songwriting competition in 2006). In 2006 he decided to sell his house to finance the filming of his first feature film, In Your Absence (2008). It was a low budget production made with unknown actors, but it woke the interest of critics. The film was featured in several festivals, including Vancouver, Palm Springs, Chicago, Bahamas, and Athens. In Vancouver the film finished fifth out of more than 200 films. Vanguard International Cinema distributed the film in North America.

For the next project, the director moved to a town of Seville, Lebrija. He lived there for a year to study the local people so as to cast them correctly. For funding, Noel, lacking a budget, raised the money through donations. He arranged free rentals of shooting locations and the actors volunteered to work for free. It was filmed during the summer of 2008 and was released in 2009 with the title Gap later changed to Brecha. It opened to small venues in Spain and was received with praise by its audiences.

In 2010 he released ¡Primaria!, his third feature film. He shot it in the San Francisco de Paula school in Seville. He spent a year there, teaching the children art. Since it was the first time in film making history that the same teacher of the children was also their director in a film, Noel believed that this would increase the naturalness in the representation of scenes by the child actors, creating a very favorable context to get real emotions. In this sense, Noel liked to say this film is "a story with children where nothing is invented, even the most unlikely thing". Noel defines the film as "a comedy about the bowels of the primary starring three students, Jose Joaquin, Carlos and Carmen." The film also portrays the life of the faculty, focusing mainly on three of them. The film was a contender in the 2010 Tokyo International Film Festival.

With Vuelve, commercially released in 2012, Noel moved into the horror genre. Filmed in Argentina, it is about a boy who loses his mother under strange circumstances. She communicates with him from beyond the grave, seeking a reunion. The film premiered on 12 October 2011 at the Festival of Unusual Cinema of Buenos Aires. His next project, Limbo was released in 2013.

They Returned turns on the strange disappearance of three children from their small town, and their reappearance three days later in a strange state.

"They Returned" is a "thriller with strong supernatural elements, drawing on a political historical context," explained Betina Goldman, from long-running Latin America and horror specialist One Eyed. "We see great festival and critical recognition potential in the works," she added.

The Tutor (2016) is about Mona, a young woman who becomes the preceptor of an orphaned girl and boy living with their housemaid in a noble estate in the north of Argentina. The children are semi-feral and mostly left to themselves. Their new tutor's mission is to bring them back to civilization, but they resist forcefully. José, the former gardener, appears regularly and seeks out the boy's company. Mona thinks José is to blame for the children's problems, even as they and the maid tell her that José died two years earlier. The scenario is based on The Turn of the Screw, a novella by Henry James. It's a story of ghosts but the main theme is the tutor's sexual hysteria which poisons the children's world. Her protective instincts lead to catastrophe.

Ivan Noel ran the film production company Noel Films, who, aside from the feature films listed below, have produced a dozen commercials and as many videoclips, including one for the Icelandic group Sigur Rós.

== Death ==
On 19 July 2021, Noel died by suicide (cyanide) in Alta Gracia, at the age of 52, after numerous allegations of child sexual abuse against him surfaced. He left a farewell video, where he denied the allegations.

== List of films ==
- En tu ausencia (English: In Your Absence) (2008)
- Brecha (2009)
- ¡Primaria! (English: Primary!) (2010)
- Vuelve (2013)
- Limbo (English: Children of the Night) (2013)
- Ellos Volvieron (English: They Returned) (2015)
- La tutora (English: The Tutor) (2016) (other names: Rodillas Quemadas, Burnt Knees)
- Nine Meals from Chaos (2018)
- Rechazados (2019) (English: Rejected)
- Cordero de Dios (English: Lamb of God) (2020 in post production)
