= Descriptive Catalogue (1809) =

1809 exhibition catalogue by William Blake

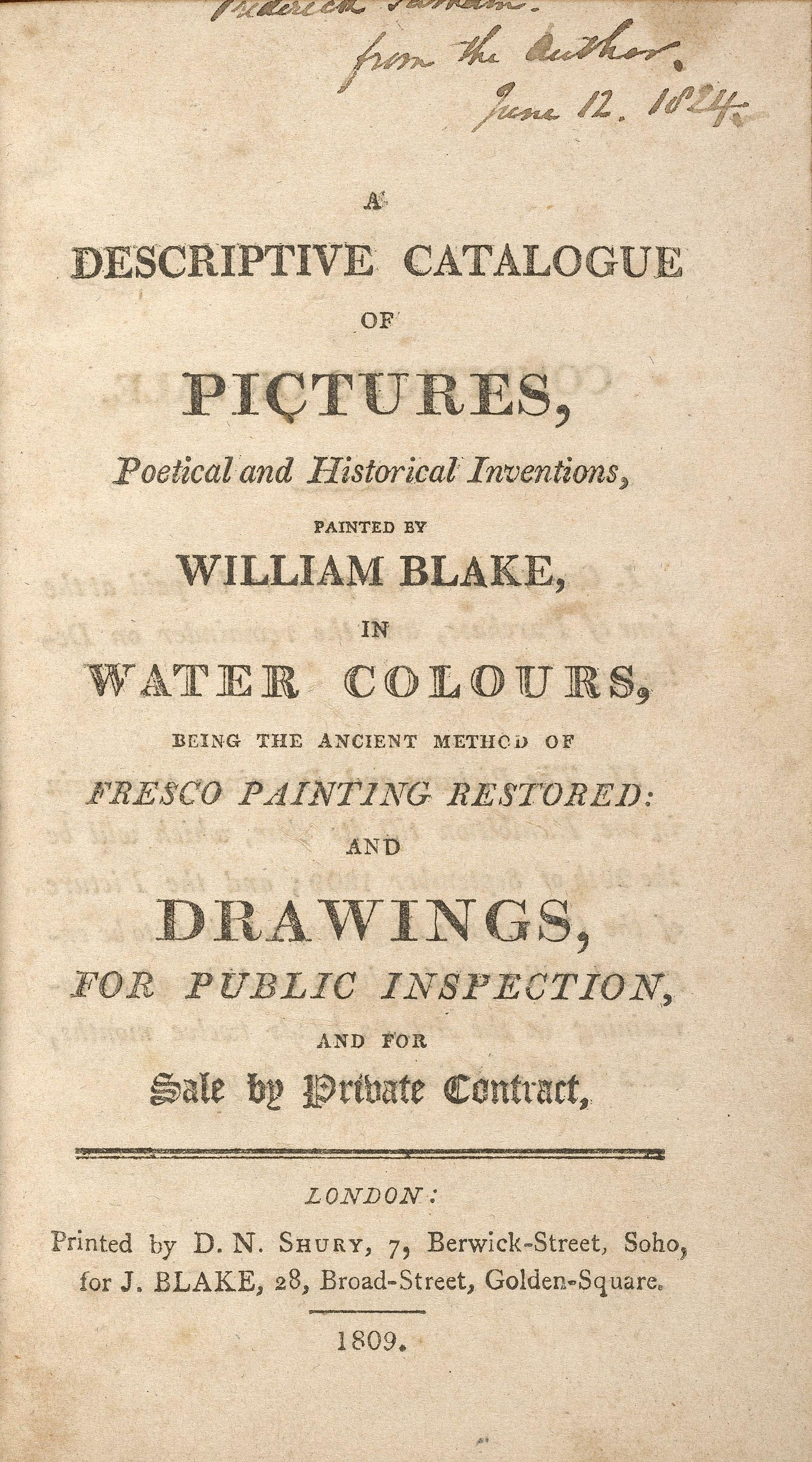
The title page of the Descriptive Catalogue

The Descriptive Catalogue of 1809 is a description of, and prospectus for, an exhibition by William Blake of a number of his own illustrations for various topics, but most notably including a set of illustrations to Chaucer's Canterbury Tales, this last being a response to a collapsed contract with dealer Robert Cromek.

Having conceived the idea of portraying the characters in Chaucer's Canterbury Pilgrims, Blake approached Cromek with a view to marketing an engraving. Knowing that Blake was too eccentric to produce a popular work, Cromek promptly commissioned Thomas Stothard to execute the concept. When Blake learned that he had been cheated, he broke off contact with Stothard, formerly a friend. He also set up an independent exhibition in his brother's haberdashery shop at 27 Broad Street in the Soho district of London. The exhibition was designed to market his own version of the Chaucer illustration, along with other works. As a result he wrote his Descriptive Catalogue of 1809, which contains what Anthony Blunt has called a "brilliant analysis" of Chaucer. It is regularly anthologised as a classic of Chaucer criticism. It also contained detailed explanations of his other paintings.

The price of the Catalogue was 2s 6d (one eighth of a pound sterling), and of admission to the exhibition 1s (one twentieth of a pound sterling); the usual price for exhibitions at the period. At the time a minor house servant might be paid ten pounds per year. An Index to the Catalogue was free with admission to the exhibition.

The Preface to the Catalogue begins with a diatribe against "the Venetian" Correggio and Titian. It concludes (using the conventional spellings of his day):

Colouring does not depend on where the Colours are put, but on where the lights and darks are put, and all depends on Form or Outline, on where that is put; where that is wrong, the Colouring never can be right; and it is always wrong in Titian and Correggio, Rubens and Rembrandt. Till we get rid of Titian and Correggio, Rubens and Rembrandt, We never shall equal Rafael and Albert Durer, Michael Angelo, and Julio Romano.

Although now lost, The Ancient Britons was the most sensational of the works displayed and with dimensions of some 10 ft by 14 ft, was the largest work ever executed by Blake. The painting depicted the last battle of King Arthur against the Romans.

The exhibition was very poorly attended, with none of the temperas or watercolours sold and was described as "a dead failure". There was only one review, in The Examiner, which was hostile.

Between April and October 2009 many of the works displayed at the original exhibition were displayed together once more at Tate Britain.

== Works included ==
The Index to the Catalogue is as follows:

Image	Number	Title	Notes
	I	The Spiritual form of Nelson guiding Leviathan c. 1805–9, Butlin #649	
	II	The Spiritual form of Pitt guiding Behemoth c. 1805, Butlin #651	
	III	The Canterbury Pilgrims, from Chaucer c. 1808, Butlin #653	Blake's painting, and the detail of the coloured engraving (Geoffrey Chaucer on his black horse) on the left
	IV	The Bard, from Gray c. 1809, Butlin #655	
Lost	V	The Ancient Britons c. 1809, Butlin #657	
	VI	A Subject from Shakspeare [sic] c. 1809, Butlin #658	Blake entitled the picture "A spirit vaulting from a cloud to turn and wind a fiery Pegasus"; Blake says that in his illustration "The Horse of Intellect is leaping from the cliffs of Memory: it is a barren Rock: it is also called the Barren Waste of Locke and Newton." The First Part of Henry IV, Act IV, Scene i, where Sir Richard Vernon at the Battle of Shrewsbury comments on the sudden transformation of Prince Hal into a soldier who "vaulted with such ease into his seat / As if an angel dropp'd down from the clouds/ To turn and wind a fiery Pegasus/ And witch the world with noble horsemanship." Inscribed and dated: "W Blake 1809" Pen, ink and watercolor, size 308 × 192 mm British Museum, London.
Lost	VII	The Goats c. 1809, Butlin #659	
Lost	VIII	The Spiritual Protector c. 1809, Butlin #660	
	IX	Satan calling up his Legions, from Milton c. 1795-1800, Butlin #6611	
Lost	X	The Bramins [sic] - A Drawing c. 1809, Butlin #663	a depiction of Charles Wilkins consulting Brahmins while making the first English translation of the Bhagavad Gita.
	XI	"Cain Fleeing from the Wrath of God" or "The Body of Abel found by Adam and Eve, Cain fleeing away" A Drawing c. 1805-1809 c. 1805-9, Butlin #664	Watercolor and black ink over graphite on cream wove paper 30.3 x 32.6 cm (11 15/16 x 12 13/16 in.) Harvard Art Museums/Fogg Museum, Bequest of Grenville L. Winthrop [Genesis 4:8]
	XII	Soldiers casting Lots for Christ's Garment - A Drawing c. 1800, Butlin #495	[John 19:30–31]
	XIII	Jacob's Ladder - A Drawing c. 1805, Butlin #438	[Genesis 28:12]
	XIV	Angels hovering over the Body of Jesus in the Sepulchre - A Drawing c. 1805, Butlin #500	[John 20:12]
	XV	Ruth - A Drawing c. 1803, Butlin #456	[Ruth 1:16] Ruth the Dutiful Daughter-in-law, 1803, Southampton Art Gallery
	XVI	The Penance of Jane Shore - A Drawing c. 1793, Butlin #69	

== Sources ==
- ed. Geoffrey Keynes: Blake: Complete Writings, Oxford University Press, 1989. ISBN 0-19-281050-2. Based on material originally published by the Nonesuch Press, 1948 and 1957, and subsequently transferred to OUP.
