= Limbo (Coleridge poem) =

Poem by Samuel Taylor Coleridge

"Limbo" is a poem written by Samuel Taylor Coleridge. Most of its text was published posthumously.
