= Deaths in November 2012 =

The following is a list of notable deaths in November 2012.

Entries for each day are listed alphabetically by surname. A typical entry lists information in the following sequence:

- Name, age, country of citizenship and reason for notability, established cause of death, reference.

== November 2012 ==
=== 1 ===
- Mary Applebey, 96, English civil servant and mental health campaigner, fall.
- Brad Armstrong, 50, American professional wrestler (WWE, WCW, NWA).
- John Lee Armstrong, 79, American football player and coach.
- Chen Zude, 68, Chinese Go player, cancer.
- Chong Chee Kin, 39, Singaporean journalist, heart failure.
- Mir Abdolrez Daryabeigi, 82, Iranian artist.
- Stan Enebo, 87, American politician and electrician.
- Agustín García Calvo, 86, Spanish academic, respiratory failure.
- Geoffrey Lofthouse, 86, British politician, MP for Pontefract and Castleford (1978–1997).
- Jan Louwers, 82, Dutch footballer (FC Eindhoven).
- Mitch Lucker, 28, American musician and singer (Suicide Silence), traffic collision.
- Pascual Pérez, 55, Dominican baseball player (Atlanta Braves, Montreal Expos), bludgeoning.
- Omry Ronen, 75, Ukrainian-born American Slavist, stroke.
- Jonathan Street, 69, British novelist and public relations executive, fall.
- Edwin Q. White, 90, American journalist, Saigon bureau chief for the Associated Press (1965–1975), heart failure.

=== 2 ===
- Shreeram Shankar Abhyankar, 82, Indian mathematician.
- Annette Baier, 83, New Zealand philosopher.
- Herman Bank, 96, American mechanical engineer (JPL).
- Milt Campbell, 78, American Olympic gold medal-winning (1956) decathlete, prostate cancer and diabetes.
- David L. Cornwell, 67, American politician, U.S. Representative from Indiana (1977–1979), kidney cancer.
- Peter B. Dews, 89–90, American psychologist and pharmacologist.
- Robert Morton Duncan, 85, American federal judge (Armed Forces Court of Appeals, Southern Ohio District Court).
- Dusty Ellis, 59, American whistleblower, cancer.
- Joe Ginsberg, 86, American baseball player (Chicago White Sox, Cleveland Indians, Detroit Tigers).
- Han Suyin, 95, Chinese-born British writer (A Many-Splendoured Thing).
- Emilio Homps, 98, Argentine Olympic silver medal-winning (1948) sailor.
- Just A Dash, 35, Australian Thoroughbred racehorse, winner of the 1981 Melbourne Cup and Adelaide Cup, euthanized.
- Hans Lindgren, 80, Swedish actor.
- Mohammed Rafeh, 30, Syrian actor, shot.
- Pino Rauti, 85, Italian politician.
- János Rózsás, 86, Hungarian writer.
- Ken Stephinson, 79, British television director and producer.
- John C. Tyson, 86, American judge (Alabama Court of Criminal Appeals), natural causes.
- Roger Wood, 87, Belgian-born American editor and journalist (Daily Express, New York Post), cancer.
- Kinjarapu Yerran Naidu, 55, Indian politician, MP for Srikakulam (1996–2009), traffic collision.

=== 3 ===
- Carmélia Alves, 89, Brazilian baião singer, multiple organ seizure.
- Hans Henrik Andersen, 75, Danish nuclear physicist.
- Fotis Balopoulos, 68, Greek footballer.
- Sattar Beheshti, 35, Iranian blogger.
- Marie Bell, 90, New Zealand educationalist.
- Anne-Lise Berntsen, 69, Norwegian soprano singer.
- Odd Børretzen, 85, Norwegian author and singer, pneumonia.
- George Chesterton, 90, British cricketer.
- Duke Vin, 84, Jamaican-born British disk jockey and sound system operator.
- Franz Dumont, 67, German historian.
- Tommy Godwin, 91, British Olympic bronze medal-winning (1948) track cyclist.
- Evelyn Byrd Harrison, 82, American classical scholar and archaeologist.
- Mükerrem Hiç, 83, Turkish academic and politician.
- Greg King, 43, New Zealand lawyer, suicide.
- Thomas K. McCraw, 72, American scholar (Harvard University) and author (Prophets of Regulation).
- Kailashpati Mishra, 89, Indian politician, Governor of Gujarat and Rajasthan (2003–04), asthma.
- Eugenija Pleškytė, 74, Lithuanian actress.
- Charles Schwartz Jr., 90, American senior federal judge (US District Court of Eastern Louisiana).
- Ingegerd Troedsson, 83, Swedish politician, MP for Uppsala County (1974–1994), first female Speaker of the Riksdag (1991–1994).
- Vasily Vladimirov, 89, Russian mathematician.

=== 4 ===
- Anne-Marie Albiach, 75, French poet and translator, following a long illness.
- Mildred Vorpahl Baass, 95, American poet, Poet Laureate of Texas (1993–1995).
- Akhtaruzzaman Chowdhury Babu, 67, Bangladeshi politician, kidney disease.
- Pier Cesare Bori, 75, Italian professor.
- J. H. Burns, 90, Scottish historian.
- Fabio Castillo Figueroa, 91, Salvadoran politician.
- Ted Curson, 77, American jazz trumpeter, heart attack.
- Jim Durham, 65, American sportscaster, heart attack.
- Samuel S. Freedman, 85, American politician (Connecticut House, 1972–1978), judge (Connecticut Superior Court, 1978–2010); professor (Quinnipiac).
- Mike L. Fry, 61, American businessman and entertainer, immune disorder.
- Dan Gavriliu, 97, Romanian surgeon.
- Beverley Goodway, 69, British glamour photographer, prostate cancer.
- Frances Hashimoto, 69, American businesswoman and civic leader, inventor of mochi ice cream, lung cancer.
- Marit Henie, 87, Norwegian Olympic (1948) figure skater.
- Eiji Hosoya, 67, Japanese businessman, Chairman of Resona Holdings.
- Jane Holtz Kay, 74, American architecture and urban design critic and author.
- Peter O'Donohue, 89, Australian VFL football player (Hawthorn).
- Reg Pickett, 85, English footballer (Portsmouth, Ipswich Town).
- Kirk Reeves, 56, American street entertainer, suicide by gunshot.
- David Resnick, 88, Brazilian-born Israeli architect and town planner.
- Jacob Sahaya Kumar Aruni, 38, Indian restaurateur and television show host, heart attack.
- Glen Morgan Williams, 92, American senior federal judge, Western District Court of Virginia (1976–2010).
- Verle Wright Jr., 84, American Olympic sports shooter.

=== 5 ===
- Assem Salam, 87–88, Lebanese civil engineer.
- Umesh Chandra Banerjee, 74, Indian judge.
- Bernard Bierman, 104, American composer.
- Joseph Oliver Bowers, 102, Dominican-born Antiguan Roman Catholic prelate, Bishop of Accra, Ghana (1953–1971), and Saint John's – Basseterre (1971–1981).
- Olympe Bradna, 92, French-born American dancer and actress (College Holiday, Souls at Sea, The Night of Nights).
- Julia Britton, 98, Australian playwright.
- Charles V. Bush, 72, American air force officer, first African American to graduate from the US Air Force Academy, colon cancer.
- Elliott Carter, 103, American composer, natural causes.
- Frank Cope, 83, English weightlifter.
- Paul L. Douglas, 85, American lawyer and politician.
- James R. Dumpson, 103, American public servant, Commissioner of the New York City Department of Welfare (1959–1965), stroke.
- Leonardo Favio, 74, Argentine singer, actor, and film director (Chronicle of a Boy Alone, Juan Moreira, Nazareno Cruz and the Wolf), polyneuritis melaminosa and HCV.
- Bob Kaplan, 75, Canadian politician, oversaw creation of CSIS, Solicitor General (1980–1984), MP for Don Valley (1968–1972) and York Centre (1974–1993), cancer.
- Razaullah Khan, 75, Pakistani cricketer.
- Reis Leming, 81, American George Medal-winning airman.
- Margaret Nichols, 82, American animator and executive of I.A.T.S.E.
- Louis Pienaar, 86, South African lawyer and diplomat, Administrator-General of Namibia (1985–1990).
- Keith Ripley, 77, English footballer.
- Sikandar Sanam, 52, Pakistani actor and comedian, liver cancer.
- Stalking Cat, 54, American body modifier.
- Jimmy Stephen, 90, Scottish footballer.
- Bertram Wyatt-Brown, 80, American historian and author, pulmonary fibrosis.

=== 6 ===
- Larry Alexander, 62, American politician, member of the Massachusetts House (1979–1990).
- Aloysius Balina, 67, Tanzanian Roman Catholic prelate, Bishop of Geita (1984–1997) and Shinyanga (since 1997), liver cancer.
- Hetty Blok, 92, Dutch actress, comedian, singer and director.
- Ron Braden, 64, American football and baseball coach.
- Joel Connable, 39, American journalist, diabetic seizure.
- Rita Cornforth, 97, Australian–British biochemist.
- Charles Delporte, 83, Belgian painter and sculptor.
- Bo Dickinson, 77, American football player.
- Clive Dunn, 92, British actor (Dad's Army) and singer ("Grandad"), complications following operation.
- Samuel Guo Chuan-zhen, 94, Chinese Roman Catholic prelate, Auxiliary Bishop of Jinan (1997–2000).
- Vladimír Jiránek, 74, Czech cartoonist and animator.
- Theodore T. Jones, 68, American judge, NY Court of Appeals (since 2007), apparent heart attack.
- Carmen Martínez Sierra, 108, Spanish actress.
- Ernest Mateen, 46, American boxer, shot.
- Maxim of Bulgaria, 98, Bulgarian Orthodox hierarch, Patriarch of All Bulgaria (since 1971), heart ailment.
- Panbanisha, 26, American bonobo involved in language studies (Great Ape Trust), common cold.
- Ivor Powell, 96, Welsh footballer (Queens Park Rangers, Aston Villa) and coach (Carlisle United, Team Bath).
- Frank J. Prial, 82, American journalist and wine critic (The New York Times), complications of prostate cancer.
- Damaskinos Roumeliotis, 92, Greek Orthodox hierarch, Metropolitan of Maronia and Komotini (1974–2012), multiple organ failure.
- Bohdan Tsap, 71, Ukrainian footballer and youth football trainer.
- Carmen Warschaw, 95, American politician and philanthropist, natural causes.

=== 7 ===
- Carmen Basilio, 85, American dual world champion boxer, pneumonia.
- Ray Beckwith, 100, South Australian wine chemist.
- Aleksandr Berkutov, 80, Russian Olympic gold medal-winning (1956, 1960) rower.
- Heinz-Jürgen Blome, 65, German footballer (VfL Bochum).
- Murray Byrne, 84, Australian politician, member of the Victorian Legislative Council for Ballarat Province (1958–1976).
- Henry Colman, 89, American producer and screenwriter.
- Alan Coxon, 82, English cricketer.
- Ellen Douglas, 91, American writer, heart failure.
- Kevin O'Donnell Jr., 61, American science fiction author, lung cancer.
- David Olive, 75, British theoretical physicist.
- Glenys Page, 72, New Zealand cricketer.
- Sandy Pearson, 94, Australian major general, Commander of the 1st Australian Task Force (1968–1969).
- Frank Peppiatt, 85, Canadian-born American television writer and producer, co-creator of Hee Haw, bladder cancer.
- Richard Robbins, 71, American musician and score writer (Howards End, Remains of the Day, A Room with a View), Parkinson's disease.
- Darrell Royal, 88, American football coach (University of Texas), Alzheimer's disease.
- Arthur K. Snyder, 79, American politician, Los Angeles City Councilman (1967–1985).
- Elliott Stein, 83, American film critic and historian.

=== 8 ===
- Péricles Azambuja, 85, Brazilian historian, writer and journalist.
- Lucille Bliss, 96, American voice actress (Crusader Rabbit, The Smurfs, Invader Zim), natural causes.
- Robert McCallum Blumenthal, 81, American mathematician.
- Herbert Carter, 93, American pilot (Tuskegee Airmen).
- György Danis, 67, Hungarian politician.
- Bruce Evans, 87, Australian politician, member of the Victorian Legislative Assembly for Gippsland East (1961–1992).
- Bobby Gilfillan, 74, Scottish footballer (Doncaster Rovers), prostate cancer.
- Gerard Gramse, 68, Polish sprinter.
- Roger Hammond, 76, British actor (The King's Speech, The Madness of King George, Around the World in 80 Days), cancer.
- Leo Keke, 65, Nauruan politician, MP (1976-1980).
- Cornel Lucas, 92, British photographer.
- Lee MacPhail, 95, American baseball Hall of Fame general manager (Baltimore Orioles, New York Yankees), American League President (1973–1984), natural causes.
- Pete Namlook, 51, German electronic musician, producer and composer, founder of FAX music label, heart attack.
- Patrick Francis Sheehan, 80, Irish-born Nigerian Roman Catholic prelate, Bishop of Yola (1970–1996) and Kano (1996–2008).
- Robert Swenning, 88, American figure skater.

=== 9 ===
- Pirkko Aro, 89, Finnish journalist and politician.
- John Attenborough, 84, English businessman, brother of Richard Attenborough and David Attenborough.
- Leaford Bearskin, 91, American tribal leader, Chief of the Wyandotte Nation (1983–2011).
- Roger Blais, 95, Canadian film director and producer.
- Aïssatou Boiro, 57–58, Guinean civil servant, murdered.
- William Brandon Lacy Campos, 35, African American poet, HIV and gay rights activist.
- Dieter Bührle, 90, Swiss industrialist.
- Nora Bustamante Luciani, 88, Venezuelan physician, historian, writer and intellectual.
- René Changeat, 81, French gymnast.
- Milan Čič, 80, Slovak lawyer and politician, Prime Minister of the Slovak Socialist Republic (1989–1990), complications from a stroke.
- Iurie Darie, 83, Romanian actor (A Bomb Was Stolen), complications from a stroke.
- Joseph D. Early, 79, American politician, member of the House of Representatives from Massachusetts (1975–1993).
- Valerie Eliot, 86, British editor, widow of T. S. Eliot.
- Isaac Fadoyebo, 86, Nigerian soldier.
- Harold Gould, 88, American baseball player (Philadelphia Stars).
- Major Harris, 65, American R&B singer ("Love Won't Let Me Wait"), member of The Delfonics, heart and lung failure.
- Bobbi Jordan, 75, American actress (General Hospital, Mame), heart attack.
- Will van Kralingen, 61, Dutch actress (Havinck, Temmink: The Ultimate Fight), cancer.
- Herbie Kronowitz, 89, American boxer.
- Helen Mussallem, 97, Canadian nurse.
- Sergey Nikolsky, 107, Russian mathematician.
- Billy O'Brien, 83, American politician, member of the Virginia House (1974–1992).
- Bernard Perera, 56, Sri Lankan cricketer.
- Paul Petrie, 84, American poet and academic.
- Pat Renella, 83, American actor (Bullitt, General Hospital, The New Phil Silvers Show).
- Jim Sinclair, 79, Canadian non-status Indian aboriginal activist and politician, cancer.
- Malcolm Smith, 80, South African cricketer.
- James L. Stone, 89, American army officer and prisoner of war, recipient of the Medal of Honor.
- Bill Tarmey, 71, British actor (Coronation Street), heart attack.
- Hubert Zimmermann, 71, French computer scientist.

=== 10 ===
- Witkop Badenhorst, 71–72, South African Army general, pneumonia and heart failure.
- Robert Carter, 102, British Royal Air Force officer.
- Isabel Coe, 61, Australian rights activists.
- John Louis Coffey, 90, American federal judge (U.S. 7th Circuit Court of Appeals).
- Eric Day, 91, English footballer (Southampton F.C.).
- Eric Devenport, 86, British Anglican prelate, Bishop of Dunwich (1980–1992).
- Stuart Freedman, 68, American physicist.
- Kekoo Gandhy, 92, Indian art gallerist, art collector and art connoisseur, pancreatic cancer.
- Gilbert Geis, 87, American criminologist.
- Wilhelm Hennis, 89, German political scientist.
- Sándor Kiss, 71, Hungarian Olympic gymnast.
- Marian Lines, 78, British writer and actress.
- Mitsuko Mori, 92, Japanese actress, heart failure.
- Mynavathi, 78, Indian actress, cardiac arrest.
- Ricky Naputi, 39, Guamanian obese man, heaviest in world.
- Alexander Perepilichny, 44, Russian businessman and whistleblower.
- Piet van Zeil, 85, Dutch politician, State Secretary for Economic Affairs (1981–1986) and Social Affairs (1982), Mayor of Heerlen (1986–1992).

=== 11 ===
- Lam Adesina, 73, Nigerian politician, Governor of Oyo State (1999–2003).
- Edith Anrep, 100, Swedish lawyer and feminist.
- Joe Egan, 93, British rugby league footballer.
- Tomaž Ertl, 79, Slovenian communist-era politician.
- Alex Esclamado, 84, Filipino-born American media and civic leader, pneumonia.
- David Gwynne-James, 75, Welsh first-class cricketer, British Army officer and military historian, head injuries sustained after a heart attack.
- Iqbal Haider, 67, Pakistani politician, Law Minister (1993–1994), lung disease.
- Sir Rex Hunt, 86, British diplomat and colonial administrator, Governor of the Falkland Islands (1980–1982, 1982–1985).
- Farish Jenkins, 72, American palaeontologist, complications of pneumonia.
- Jalal Mansouri, 82, Iranian Olympic weightlifter.
- Victor Mees, 85, Belgian footballer (Royal Antwerp F.C.).
- Patricia Monaghan, 66, American author.
- Ilya Oleynikov, 65, Russian comedian and actor, cardiovascular disease.
- Johnny Prescott, 74, English boxer.
- Harry Wayland Randall, 96, American World War II veteran and war photographer.
- Tarachand Sahu, 65, Indian politician, MP for Durg (1996–2009), multiple organ failure.
- Hal Ziegler, 80, American politician, member of the Michigan House (1966–1974), Michigan Senate (1975–1978), heart attack.

=== 12 ===
- Charles Kofi Agbenaza, 80–81, Ghanaian politician.
- Coty Beavers, 28, American murder victim, shot.
- Arthur Bialas, 81, German footballer.
- Marshall Bouldin III, 89, American portrait painter.
- Dave Cahill, 71, American football player.
- Robert J. Cotter, 69, American chemist and mass spectrometrist, heart failure.
- Angela Cropper, 66, Trinidadian diplomat and politician.
- Anthony di Bonaventura, 83, American pianist and academic.
- Bob French, 74, American jazz musician and radio show host, dementia and diabetes.
- Hans Hammarskiöld, 87, Swedish photographer, after a brief illness.
- Alan Hopkins, 86, British politician, complications following a heart operation.
- Michel Hrynchyshyn, 83, Canadian-born French Ukrainian Catholic hierarch, Apostolic Exarch in France, Benelux and Switzerland (1982–2012).
- Harry McShane, 92, Scottish footballer.
- Mario Murillo, 85, Costa Rican footballer.
- Sergio Oliva, 71, Cuban-born American bodybuilder, Mr. Olympia (1967–1969).
- Fred Ridgeway, 59, English actor, motor neurone disease.
- Daniel Stern, 78, American psychiatrist, heart failure.
- Ronald Stretton, 82, English Olympic bronze medal-winning (1952) track cyclist.
- Willis Whitfield, 92, American physicist and inventor (Cleanroom).
- John Winter, 82, British architect, respiratory failure.
- Wilbur Woo, 96, Chinese-born American politician and community leader, complications from stroke and pneumonia.
- Walt Zeboski, 83, American photographer (Associated Press), pneumonia.

=== 13 ===
- Murray Arnold, 74, American basketball coach (Chattanooga Mocs, Perth Wildcats), cancer.
- Will Barnet, 101, American painter.
- Naima Bayari, Moroccan Muay Thai kickboxer, gas leak.
- Bryce Bayer, 83, American scientist (Bayer filter).
- Miguel Bustamante, 73, Ecuadorian footballer.
- Ray Carter, 79, English cricketer.
- Erazm Ciołek, 75, Polish photojournalist.
- Kenneth Cragg, 99, British Anglican priest and scholar.
- Robert Shirley, 13th Earl Ferrers, 83, British peer, Deputy Leader of the House of Lords (1979–1983, 1988–1997).
- Jack Gilbert, 87, American poet, pneumonia with complications from Alzheimer's disease.
- Milan Horálek, 80, Czech economist and politician, Minister of Labour and Social Affairs (1990–1992).
- John Kelly, 82, Irish Olympic racewalker.
- Manolo Peña, 46, Spanish footballer (Real Zaragoza, Real Valladolid), cancer.
- John Sheridan, 78, English rugby league footballer (Castleford).
- Yao Defen, 40, Chinese record holder, world's tallest woman.
- Ray Zone, 65, American cinema historian, adaptor and 3D expert, heart attack.

=== 14 ===
- Alex Alves, 37, Brazilian footballer (Hertha BSC), leukemia.
- Enrique Beech, 92, Filipino Olympic shooter.
- Harold G. Christensen, 86, American attorney, cancer.
- William Cusano, 69, Italian-born Canadian politician, complications from surgery.
- Mildred Inks Davidson Dalrymple, 92, American military aviator.
- Brian Davies, 82, Australian rugby league footballer.
- Martin Fay, 76, Irish musician (The Chieftains).
- Wendell Garrett, 83, American historian, appraiser on Antiques Roadshow, natural causes.
- Joe Gilliam Sr., 89, American football coach (Tennessee State).
- Daniel Goodman, 67, American ecologist and biologist, complications from surgery.
- Norman Greenwood, 87, Australian-born British chemist.
- Gail Harris, 81, American baseball player (New York Giants, Detroit Tigers).
- Ramon Torres Hernandez, 41, American serial killer, execution by lethal injection.
- Ahmed Jabari, 52, Palestinian military leader (Hamas), airstrike.
- Lucien Laferte, 93, Canadian ski jumper.
- Bertram McLean, 64, Jamaican musician.
- Paddy Meegan, 90, Irish football player (Meath GAA).
- Luíz Eugênio Pérez, 84, Brazilian Roman Catholic prelate, Bishop of Jales (1970–1981) and Jaboticabal (1981–2003), complications following surgery.
- Olusola Saraki, 79, Nigerian politician.
- Stanley Smith, 75, English rugby league footballer.
- Adrián Silva Moreno, 34, Mexican journalist, shot.

=== 15 ===
- Théophile Abega, 58, Cameroonian footballer (Canon Yaoundé, Toulouse F.C.), cardiac arrest.
- Kader Bhayat, 76, Mauritian lawyer and politician.
- Luís Carreira, 35, Portuguese motorcycle racer, race collision.
- Harry Christiani, 87, Guyanese cricketer.
- Christopher Crawford, 73, American tennis player, prostate cancer.
- Harvey Tristan Cropper, 81, American painter, cancer.
- María Santos Gorrostieta Salazar, 36, Mexican politician, Mayor of Tiquicheo (2008–2011), beating and stabbing.
- Khin Maung Toe, 62, Burmese singer–songwriter, cancer.
- Josef Kloimstein, 84, Austrian Olympic silver (1960) and bronze (1956) medal-winning rower.
- Maleli Kunavore, 29, Fijian rugby player (Toulouse), cardiac arrest.
- Moosa Mangera, 67, South African cricketer.
- Gerrit Oosting, 71, Dutch politician.
- K. C. Pant, 81, Indian politician, Minister of Defence (1987–1989), heart attack.
- David Oliver Relin, 49, American journalist and author, suicide by train.
- José Song Sui-Wan, 71, Chinese-born Brazilian Roman Catholic prelate, Bishop of São Gabriel da Cachoeira (2002–2009), Parkinson's disease and liver tumor.
- Frode Thingnæs, 72, Norwegian jazz musician ("The First Day of Love", "Mata Hari"), complications from a heart attack.
- William Turnbull, 90, Scottish artist.

=== 16 ===
- Stuart Babbage, 96, Australian Anglican priest, Dean of Sydney (1947–1953) and Melbourne (1953–1962).
- Leo Blair, 89, British academic.
- David Bolt, 84, English novelist and literary agent.
- Alby Broadby, 95, Australian politician, member (1968–1988) and President (1984–1988) of the Tasmanian Legislative Council.
- Eric Burgin, 88, British cricketer (Yorkshire).
- Fernando Casanova, 86, Mexican actor, prostate cancer.
- John Chapman, 82, Australian evangelist, multiple organ failure.
- Luis de los Cobos, 85, Spanish composer.
- Louis Tom Dragna, 92, Italian-American mobster.
- Subhash Dutta, 82, Bangladeshi filmmaker, heart disease.
- Patrick Edlinger, 52, French climber, fall.
- Kayode Eso, 87, Nigerian jurist.
- Jefferson Kaye, 75, American radio, television, and film announcer, cancer.
- Aliu Mahama, 66, Ghanaian politician, Vice President (2001–2009), complications from a stroke.
- Hubert Meyer, 98, German army officer.
- Helen Milliken, 89, American First Lady of Michigan (1969–1983), ovarian cancer.
- James W. Moseley, 81, American ufologist.
- Eliyahu Nawi, 92, Israeli politician and jurist, Mayor of Beersheba (1963–1986).
- Bob Scott, 91, New Zealand rugby union player.
- Bob Wiggins, 79, American Negro American League baseball outfielder.

=== 17 ===
- Sushila Adivarekar, 89, Indian politician.
- Nina Aleshina, 88, Russian architect.
- Ingrid Bruce, 72, Swedish engineer.
- Ponty Chadha, 55, Indian businessman, shot.
- Armand Desmet, 81, Belgian professional cyclist.
- Branko Elsner, 82, Slovenian footballer and coach.
- Dick Felt, 79, American football player (New York Titans, Boston Patriots), natural causes.
- Bonnie Lynn Fields, 68, American actress (Angel in My Pocket, Bye Bye Birdie, Funny Girl) and Mouseketeer, throat cancer.
- Kathleen Fowler, 87, Australian military officer.
- Christian Godefroy, 64, French author.
- Lea Gottlieb, 94, Israeli fashion designer.
- Henryk Grzybowski, 78, Polish footballer (Legia Warsaw).
- Katherine Kath, 92, French ballerina turned actress.
- Robert Lin, 70, Chinese-born American professor and experimental physicist, stroke.
- Arnaud Maggs, 86, Canadian artist and photographer.
- Eduardo Morales Miranda, 102, Chilean educator, co-founder of the Universidad Austral de Chile.
- Cliff Pilkey, 90, Canadian politician and trade union leader.
- Freddy Schmidt, 96, American baseball player (St. Louis Cardinals, Philadelphia Phillies, Chicago Cubs).
- Billy Scott, 70, American singer, pancreatic and liver cancer.
- David Speer, 61, American businessman, CEO of Illinois Tool Works, cancer.
- Bal Thackeray, 86, Indian politician, cardio-respiratory arrest.
- Margaret Yorke, 88, British crime fiction writer.

=== 18 ===
- Graham Anderson, 83, British-born Canadian heraldic scholar and officer of arms.
- Emilio Aragón Bermúdez, 83, Spanish clown, accordionist, and singer.
- Alan Barblett, 83, Australian Olympic hockey player.
- Burke Deadrich, 67, American wrestler.
- Elena Donaldson-Akhmilovskaya, 55, Russian-born American chess grandmaster, brain cancer.
- David Eaton, 78, South African cricketer.
- Stan Greig, 82, Scottish pianist, drummer, and bandleader, Parkinson's disease.
- Phoebe Hearst Cooke, 85, American businesswoman (Hearst Corporation) and philanthropist, pneumonia.
- Francis D. Imbuga, 65, Kenyan playwright and academic, stroke.
- Ian Kirkpatrick, 82, South African rugby union player and coach.
- Neva Jane Langley, 79, American beauty pageant queen, Miss America (1953), cancer.
- Sir Philip Ledger, 74, British classical musician and academic.
- William McCarthy, Baron McCarthy, 87, British politician and life peer.
- Kenny Morgans, 73, Welsh footballer (Manchester United), Munich air disaster survivor.
- Kyrillos Oikonomopoulos, 82, Cypriot-born Zimbabwean Orthodox hierarch, Metropolitan of Zimbabwe (2001–2002).
- Ed Richards, 83, American Olympic fencer (1964).
- Helmut Sonnenfeldt, 86, German-born American foreign policy official, Alzheimer's disease.
- Don R. Swanson, 88, American information scientist.

=== 19 ===
- James Bassham, 89, American scientist.
- David G. Cantor, 77, American mathematician.
- Ken Charlton, 89, Australian rugby league footballer.
- John Cooper, 90, Australian cricketer.
- Omar Abdallah Dakhqan, Jordanian politician, Agriculture Minister.
- Bill Durkin, 90, American basketball player.
- John Hefin, 71, Welsh television director and producer (Pobol y Cwm, The Life and Times of David Lloyd George), cancer.
- Viter Juste, 87, Haitian-born American community leader, coined the term "Little Haiti", dementia and diabetes.
- Hannie Lips, 88, Dutch television announcer.
- Shiro Miya, 69, Japanese enka singer.
- Pete La Roca, 74, American jazz drummer, lung cancer.
- Joe Riordan, 82, Australian politician, member of the House of Representatives for Phillip (1972–1975), Minister for Housing and Construction (1975).
- Warren Rudman, 82, American politician, Senator from New Hampshire (1980–1993), lymphoma.
- Boris Strugatsky, 79, Russian science fiction author, pneumonia.
- George D. Weber, 87, American politician, member of the Missouri House of Representatives (1965–1967), lymphoma.

=== 20 ===
- Kaspars Astašenko, 37, Latvian ice hockey player (Tampa Bay Lightning).
- Pedro Bantigue, 92, Filipino Roman Catholic prelate, Bishop of San Pablo (1967–1995), internal bleeding.
- Jersey Bridgeman, 6, American murder victim, strangulation.
- Sahidul Alam Choudhury, Indian politician.
- David C. Copley, 60, American publishing heir (Copley Press) and socialite, apparent heart attack.
- Michael Dunford, 68, English musician.
- Louis O. Giuffrida, 92, American army general, Director of Federal Emergency Management Agency (1981–1985).
- Redd Griffin, 73, American politician, member of Illinois General Assembly (1980–1983).
- William Grut, 98, Swedish Olympic gold medal-winning (1948) modern pentathlete.
- Gary Ingham, 48, English footballer (Doncaster Rovers).
- Ivan Kušan, 80, Croatian writer.
- David O'Brien Martin, 68, American politician, member of the House of Representatives from New York (1981–1993), cancer.
- Flora Martirosian, 55, Armenian singer, complications following gall bladder surgery.
- Mike Ryan, 77, Irish-born American soccer coach and first head coach of the US women's national team, aplastic anemia.

=== 21 ===
- Stephen Abrams, 74, American-born British drug policy activist.
- Berthold Albrecht, 58, German businessman.
- Mladen Bašić, 95, Croat pianist and conductor.
- Roland Baudric, 87, French wrestler.
- Dann Cahn, 89, American film and television editor (I Love Lucy), natural causes.
- Charles Denman, 5th Baron Denman, 96, British businessman and peer.
- Nick Discepola, 62, Italian-born Canadian politician, MP for Vaudreuil (1993–1997) and Vaudreuil-Soulanges (1997–2004), pancreatic neuroendocrine tumor.
- Harold Fiskari, 84, Canadian ice hockey player.
- Mr. Food, 81, American television chef (Mr. Food), pancreatic cancer.
- Șerban Ionescu, 62, Romanian actor, amyotrophic lateral sclerosis.
- Ajmal Kasab, 25, Pakistani gunman involved in 2008 Mumbai attacks, execution by hanging.
- Valcho Kostov, 76, Bulgarian Olympic freestyle wrestler (1960).
- Ernesto McCausland, 51, Colombian journalist and filmmaker, cancer.
- Vladka Meed, 90, Polish Jewish resistance member (Warsaw Ghetto Uprising survivor), Alzheimer's disease.
- Edwarda O'Bara, 59, American medical patient, died after 42 years in a diabetic coma.
- Nedu Onyeuku, 29, Nigerian basketball player, shot.
- Austin Peralta, 22, American jazz musician and composer.
- Deborah Raffin, 59, American actress (Once Is Not Enough, Death Wish 3, 7th Heaven), leukemia.
- Stein Schjærven, 78, Norwegian marketing agent.
- Rashid Sharafetdinov, 69, Russian Olympic long-distance runner.
- Eugene Smith, 94, American pilot (Tuskegee Airmen) and attorney.
- Algirdas Šocikas, 84, Lithuanian Olympic boxer.
- Emily Squires, 71, American television director (Sesame Street) and scriptwriter (Guiding Light, As the World Turns).
- Mack B. Stokes, 100, American bishop in the United Methodist Church.
- Wang Houjun, 69, Chinese footballer (Shanghai Shenhua) and coach (Shanghai Pudong), uremia.

=== 22 ===
- Frank Barsalona, 74, American talent agent and concert promoter, Alzheimer's disease.
- Peter Bennett, 77, American music promoter, heart attack.
- Bob Burtwell, 85, Canadian Olympic basketball player.
- Marion Pinckney Carnell, 84, American politician and businessman.
- Pearl Laska Chamberlain, 103, American aviator.
- John Earl Coleman, 82, American Vipassana meditation teacher. (in Italian)
- Bryce Courtenay, 79, South African-born Australian novelist (The Power of One), stomach cancer.
- Weldon Drew, 77, American basketball coach, automobile accident.
- Raimund Krauth, 59, German footballer (Eintracht Frankfurt, Karlsruher SC).
- Bennie McRae, 72, American football player (Chicago Bears).
- Yashar Nuri, 60, Azerbaijani actor.
- P. Govinda Pillai, 86, Indian politician.
- Fahimeh Rastkar, 80, Iranian actress and voice dubbing artist, Alzheimer's disease.
- Ken Rowe, 78, American baseball player (Baltimore Orioles, Los Angeles Dodgers), pneumonia.
- Lyubov Sadchikova, 61, Russian Olympic speed skater.
- Mel Shaw, 97, American design artist (Fantasia, Bambi, The Fox and the Hound, The Lion King), heart failure.
- K. H. Ting, 97, Chinese Anglican bishop.
- Jan Trefulka, 83, Czech writer and dissident, signatory of the Charter 77, renal failure and pneumonia.

=== 23 ===
- Veerapandy S. Arumugam, 75, Indian politician, respiratory failure.
- Sava Babić, 78, Serbian writer, poet, translator and university professor.
- John Bara, 85, American politician.
- José Luis Borau, 83, Spanish filmmaker, throat cancer.
- Noel Botham, 72, British journalist and author.
- Jordan Davis, 17, American student, shot.
- Peter Dawson, 66, English cricketer.
- Akkamma Devi, 94, Indian politician, MP for Nilgiris (1962–1967), first Badaga woman to graduate from college.
- Chuck Diering, 89, American baseball player (St. Louis Cardinals), cerebral hemorrhage.
- Gray Foy, 90, American artist.
- Go Native, 9, Irish Thoroughbred racehorse, winner of the 2009 Fighting Fifth Hurdle and Christmas Hurdle.
- Lawrence Guyot, 73, American civil rights activist, heart disease and diabetes.
- Larry Hagman, 81, American actor (Dallas, I Dream of Jeannie, Nixon), complications from throat cancer.
- Diana, Lady Isaac, 91, English-born New Zealand environmentalist and arts patron.
- John Kemeny, 87, Hungarian-born Canadian film producer (The Apprenticeship of Duddy Kravitz, Atlantic City), cancer.
- Tadeusz Kwapień, 89, Polish cross country skier.
- Alfonso Montemayor, 90, Mexican footballer (Club León).
- Giuseppe Nahmad, 80, Syrian art dealer.
- Adolph Peschke, 98, American outdoorsman, author and project designer in the Boy Scouts of America.
- Nelson Prudêncio, 68, Brazilian Olympic silver (1968) and bronze (1972) medal-winning triple jumper, complications from lung cancer.
- Goffredo Stabellini, 87, Italian footballer.
- Robert O. Swados, 93, American attorney and businessman.
- Hal Trosky Jr., 76, American baseball player (Chicago White Sox), lung cancer.

=== 24 ===
- Marcel Beaudry, 79, Canadian lawyer, politician and public official, cancer.
- Héctor Camacho, 50, Puerto Rican former triple world champion boxer, injuries from gunshot.
- Alec Campbell, 80, British-born Botswanan archaeologist and historian, leukemia.
- Ian Campbell, 79, British folk musician (Ian Campbell Folk Group), cancer.
- Rishi Chandrikasing, 17, Dutch teenager, shot by police.
- Ardeshir Cowasjee, 86, Pakistani newspaper columnist (Dawn), chest ailment.
- George E. Haynsworth, 90, American Episcopal prelate, missionary to Nicaragua.
- Antoine Kohn, 79, Luxembourgish football player and manager.
- Tony Leblanc, 90, Spanish actor, heart attack.
- Shawn Little, 48, Canadian politician, heart failure.
- Frank Pittman, 77, American psychiatrist and author (Private Lies: Infidelity and Betrayal of Intimacy), cancer.
- Joan Shepherd, 88, British athlete.
- Chris Stamp, 70, British music producer and manager (The Who), cancer.
- Jimmy Stewart, 73, American baseball player (Chicago Cubs, Cincinnati Reds, Houston Astros).
- Moniek Toebosch, 64, Dutch actress, artist and musician, enthusasia.
- Nicholas Turro, 74, American chemist, pancreatic cancer.
- Ernie Warlick, 80, American football player (Buffalo Bills, Calgary Stampeders).

=== 25 ===
- Juan Carlos Calderón, 74, Spanish composer and conductor.
- Earl Carroll, 75, American singer (The Cadillacs, The Coasters), complications of a stroke and diabetes.
- Clifford Digre, 89, American entrepreneur.
- Guilherme Espírito Santo, 93, Portuguese footballer and athlete.
- Simeon ten Holt, 89, Dutch contemporary classical composer.
- Lars Hörmander, 81, Swedish mathematician.
- Hans Kuhn, 92, Swiss physical chemist.
- Bert Linnecor, 78, English footballer.
- Luo Yang, 51, Chinese engineer, developer of the Shenyang J-15 program, heart attack.
- Mark Meier, 86, American glaciologist and academic.
- Juan Pereda, 81, Bolivian military leader, President (1978).
- Tommy Robinson, 74, Bahamian Olympic sprinter (1956, 1960, 1964, 1968).
- Roy Thomas Severn, 83, British civil engineer.
- Dave Sexton, 82, English footballer and manager (Chelsea, Manchester United).
- Dinah Sheridan, 92, English actress (The Railway Children).
- Martin Smyth, 76, Irish Olympic boxer.
- Lary J. Swoboda, 73, American politician, member of Wisconsin State Assembly (1970–1994), heart attack.
- Jim Temp, 79, American football player (Green Bay Packers), heart disease.
- Carlisle Towery, 92, American basketball player (Fort Wayne Zollner Pistons).

=== 26 ===
- Celso Ad. Castillo, 69, Filipino director and actor, cardiac arrest.
- Theo Brandmüller, 64, German composer.
- Jim Brewington, 73, American football player.
- Paul Neeley Brown, 86, American senior judge of the District Court for the Eastern District of Texas.
- Denis Haynes, 88, English cricketer (Staffordshire).
- Bill Hollar, 74, American racing driver.
- Edward R. Kirkland, 89, American politician.
- Joe Kulbacki, 74, American football player (Buffalo Bills).
- Mike Kume, 86, American Major League Baseball player.
- Peter Marsh, 64, Australian paralympian.
- Joseph Murray, 93, American doctor and Nobel laureate (1990), performed first kidney transplantation, hemorrhagic stroke.
- Peter C. Myers, 81, American politician, member of the Missouri House of Representatives (1998–2006), Deputy Secretary of the USDA (1982–1989).
- P. K. Venukuttan Nair, 81, Indian actor (Oolkatal, Swapnadanam).
- M. C. Nambudiripad, 93, Indian science writer.
- Kuno Pajula, 88, Estonian Evangelical Lutheran prelate, Archbishop (1987–1994).
- Martin Richards, 80, American Broadway and film producer (Chicago, La Cage aux Folles), cancer.
- Buddy Roberts, 67, American professional wrestler, member of the Fabulous Freebirds, pneumonia.
- César Sánchez, 77, Bolivian footballer.
- David Schwendeman, 87, American taxidermist (American Museum of Natural History).
- Hans Jørgen Walle-Hansen, 100, Norwegian businessman.
- Richard Wilkins, 59, American lawyer.

=== 27 ===
- Maddela Abel, 88, Indian political scientist.
- Mickey Baker, 87, American guitarist (Mickey & Sylvia) and songwriter ("Love Is Strange"), heart and kidney failure.
- Viacheslav Belavkin, 66, Russian-British mathematician.
- Gilbert Clements, 84, Canadian politician, Lieutenant Governor of Prince Edward Island (1995–2001).
- Pat Connolly, 84, Canadian sports broadcaster, throat cancer and melanoma.
- Theophilus Danzy, 82, American football coach.
- Jim Davis, 84, American politician, member of the Indiana House of Representatives (1982–1998).
- Ab Fafié, 71, Dutch footballer and coach.
- Érik Izraelewicz, 58, French media executive (Le Monde), heart attack.
- Pascal Kalemba, 33, Congolese footballer.
- Bob Kellett, 84, English film and television director.
- Ladislas Kijno, 91, Polish-born French painter.
- Jorma Limmonen, 78, Finnish Olympic boxer.
- Marvin Miller, 95, American union leader, executive director of the Major League Baseball Players Association (1966–1982), liver cancer.
- Herbert Oberhofer, 57, Austrian footballer (Admira Wacker).
- Chris Odera, 48, Kenyan Olympic boxer, kidney failure.
- Lennart Samuelsson, 88, Swedish footballer.
- Assane Seck, 93, Senegalese politician, Foreign Minister (1973–1978).
- Bennie Turner, 64, American politician and lawyer, member of the Mississippi State Senate (since 1992), brain cancer.
- Jack Wishna, 54, American businessman, suicide by carbon monoxide poisoning.

=== 28 ===
- Evelyn Ackerman, 88, American industrial designer.
- Ahmed bin Hamed al Hamed, 82–83, Emirati politician.
- Knut Ahnlund, 89, Swedish literary historian, writer, member of the Swedish Academy.
- Shahid Akbar, 54, Indian cricketer, multiple organ failure.
- Tarquinio Angiolin, 84, Italian rower.
- Sir William Bulmer, 92, British businessman, Lord Lieutenant of West Yorkshire (1978–1985).
- Gloria Davy, 81, American opera singer.
- José Maria Fidélis dos Santos, 68, Brazilian footballer (Bangu Atlético Clube), cancer.
- Jerry Finkelstein, 96, American media mogul and businessman (The Hill, New York Law Journal).
- Jakes Gerwel, 66, South African academic and corporate executive, complications following heart surgery.
- Tom Hardman, 21, English cricketer.
- Ray Heffner, 87, American academic, president of Brown University (1966–1969).
- James Day Hodgson, 96, American politician, Secretary of Labor (1970–1974) and Ambassador to Japan (1974–1977).
- Jerry D. Mahlman, 72, American meteorologist.
- Philip Mastin, 82, American politician, member of Michigan House of Representatives (1970–1976) and the Michigan Senate (1983), first Michigan Senator to be recalled.
- Cosimo Nocera, 74, Italian footballer (Foggia Calcio).
- Don Rhymer, 51, American film (Big Momma's House, Surf's Up, Rio) and television writer (Evening Shade), complications of head and neck cancer.
- Spain Rodriguez, 72, American underground cartoonist, cancer.
- Albie Thoms, 71, Australian film director, writer, and producer.
- Franco Ventriglia, 90, American opera singer.
- Zig Ziglar, 86, American author and motivational speaker, pneumonia.

=== 29 ===
- Velia Abdel-Huda, 96, Egyptian art historian and socialite.
- Joelmir Beting, 75, Brazilian journalist and writer, stroke.
- Eldon Edge, 86, American politician.
- Maddalena Fagandini, 83, British electronic musician and television producer.
- Bo Lozoff, 65, American writer and interfaith humanitarian, traffic collision.
- Susan Luckey, 74, American actress (The Music Man, Carousel), natural causes.
- Sherab Palden Beru, 100-101, Tibetan thangka artist.
- Marie-Jacques Perrier, 88, French singer and fashion journalist.
- Merv Pregulman, 90, American football player (Green Bay Packers, Detroit Lions, New York Bulldogs), steel executive and philanthropist.
- Klaus Schütz, 86, German politician, Mayor of West Berlin (1967–1977), President of the Bundesrat (1967–1968).
- Werner Seibold, 64, German Olympic bronze medallist sport shooter (1976).
- Joyce Spiliotis, 65, American politician, member of the Massachusetts House of Representatives (since 2003), cancer.
- Benjamin Tatar, 82, American actor (The Wind and the Lion, The Piano Lesson), chronic pulmonary disease.
- Ronald Frank Thiemann, 66, American professor and author, pancreatic cancer.
- Zora Wolfová, 84, Czech translator.
- Cuthbert Woodroffe, 94, Barbadian prelate, Primate of the West Indies (1980–1986).

=== 30 ===
- Rogelio Álvarez, 74, Cuban-born American baseball player (Cincinnati Reds), complications of kidney disease.
- Mario Ardizzon, 74, Italian footballer.
- Barry Berkus, 77, American architect, author and art collector.
- Lars-Gunnar Björklund, 75, Swedish radio and TV journalist.
- Rick Blackburn, 70, American music executive.
- Roman Butenko, 32, Ukrainian football player, car crash.
- Gregory S. Clark, 65, American politician.
- Mitchell Cole, 27, English footballer (Southend United, Stevenage Borough), complications of a heart defect.
- Kélétigui Diabaté, 81, Malian musician.
- Dolores Donlon, 92, American model and actress.
- Jacqueline Duc, 90, French actress.
- Jamelle Folsom, 85, American First Lady of Alabama (1948–1951, 1955–1959), mother of Jim Folsom, Jr., cancer.
- Stephen Gray, 89, English musical administrator, managed the Royal Liverpool Philharmonic.
- I. K. Gujral, 92, Indian politician, Prime Minister (1997–1998), multiple organ failure.
- Munir Malik, 78, Pakistani cricketer.
- Dolores Mantez, 76, British television actress (UFO).
- Jeff Millar, 70, American film critic (Houston Chronicle) and comic strip writer (Tank McNamara), bile duct cancer.
- Susil Moonesinghe, 82, Sri Lankan politician and diplomat.
- Homer R. Warner, 90, American cardiologist, father of medical informatics, complications of pancreatitis.
- Athar Zaidi, 66, Pakistani Test cricket umpire.
