= Mukerrem =

Mükerrem or Mukerrem is a Turkish unisex given name. Notable people with the name include:

== Male ==
- Mükerrem Hiç (1929–2012), Turkish professor of economics and political economy
- Mükerrem Sarol (1909–1995), Turkish physician and politician

== Female ==
- Mükerrem Selen Soyder (born 1986), Turkish model known professionally as Selen Soyder
- Mükerrem Kamil Su (1906–1984), Turkish writer
