= Danis =

Danis may refer to:

- Danis (butterfly), a genus of butterfly in the family Lycaenidae
- Danis Goulet (born 1977), Canadian Cree-Métis film director and screenwriter
- Donna Danis, American politician
- Yann Danis (born 1981), Canadian professional ice hockey goaltender
- György Danis (1945–2012), Hungarian physician and politician
- Marcel Danis (born 1943), Canadian university administrator, lawyer and former politician
