= Peter Dews =

Peter Dews may refer to:

- Peter Kenneth Dews (born 1952), British philosopher
- Peter Dews (director) (1933–1997), English stage director
- Peter B. Dews (1922–2012), American psychologist and pharmacologist
