= Roumeliotis =

Roumeliotis is a surname. Notable people with the surname include:

- Damaskinos Roumeliotis, Greek Orthodox Metropolitan of Maronia and Komotini
- Nikolaos Roumeliotis, Greek volleyball player
- Panagiotis Roumeliotis, Greek economist
- Stergios Roumeliotis, engineer at the University of Minnesota

== See also ==
- Roúmeli, or Roumeliotes, alternate names for Central Greece
