= Peschke =

Peschke is a surname. Notable people with the surname include:

- Adolph Peschke (1914–2012), American outdoorsman
- Heiko Peschke (born 1963), German footballer
- Květa Peschke (born 1975), Czech tennis player
