= María Cristina Carbonell =

Puerto Rican sculptor

- Born: December 15, 1964 (age 61); San Juan, Puerto Rico
- Occupation: Sculptor

María Cristina Carbonell (San Juan, Puerto Rico, December 15, 1964) is a sculptor from Puerto Rico.

== Biography ==
=== Life and work ===
Daughter of Diego Carbonell and Blanca Vernon. Between 1981 and 1982 she studied drawing and three-dimensional design at Cristóbal Rojas school. In 1982 she translated to the United States to study painting at the museum of fine arts. Between 1985 and 1987 she studied garment design for theater at the Fashion Institute of Technology of New York. At the same time, she studied drawing at the Art Students League of New York. In 1988 she did field work with marble workers at the Southern General Cemetery. However, it wasn't until 1989 that she permanently established in Venezuela to study jewelry with Quintino D’Acosta.The aesthetics of humor is addressed by the artist in the early nineties with her series of pools and her religious images.

From 1990 she began her exhibition activity in the Vía Gallery, in which he installed "Acqua que me muero de se....", a series of assemblies in the form of tiny pools where small cowbells emitted obscene songs. In 1991 she participated in the I Biennial of Puerto La Cruz, in which he received an honorable mention for her series of swimming pools, and in the II Biennial of Guayana. In 1993 she appeared in three collective shows: the I Biennial Dimple at the Athenaeum of Valencia (Edo. Carabobo), "Memoria de la visión" and the I Salon Pirelli.

In 1994 she received honorable mention in the VII Edition of the Eugenio Mendoza Award (Mendoza Room) for her carved marble steles. In the IV Biennial of Guayana, the three-dimensional work prize for Episedio canto a un guerrero muerto en combate, an installation made in 12 marble slabs of Carrara, where animal tracks (dantas, monkeys, herons and wolves) appear in bas-relief. Similarly, the names of the species under the tracks were inscribed in scientific nomenclature.

In 1995, she made the video-installation Estamos desnudos ante el vacío (We are naked before the void), in the II Pirelli Room, and participates in "Paisaje de un paisaje en seis formas de mirar" (Landscape of a landscape in six ways of looking), both in the MACCSI. In 1996, she participated in the First National Landscape Biennial, in the MACMMA; in her Paisaje de un paisaje (landscape of a landscape), she deconstructs El naufragio del Esperanza of the romantic painter Caspar David Friedrich, paraphrasing the ship of Friedrich shipwrecked between pointed blocks of ice in a desolate virtual drawing created by the shadows generated by the corpses of squid from the polar waters, suspended in space, and the urban accidents that make up the urban topography. That same year she participated in "Alegorías del Jardín de las Delicias", in the Museo Alejandro Otero (MAO), with the installation Las delicias del Edén. The artist proposed the idea of transforming the garden into a conuco (a small farm).

=== Individual expositions ===
- 1990 - "Acqua que me muero de se...", Gallery Vía, Caracas.

=== Awards ===
Among her awards, here are the highlights

- 2019 – Award Winner May 2019, Best Short Documentary, Indie Short Fest, Los Angeles International Film Festival
- 2006 – First Prize, 63 Salón Bienal Arturo Michelena, Valencia, Venezuela. –Selected Artist for Diva Container New York 2006 with the video The Art of Dealing
- 1996 – First prize, I Landscape Biennial, MAMMA / Prize, V Guiana Biennial.
- 1994 – Honorable Mention, VII Edition of the Eugenio Mendoza Prize, Mendoza Room / Three-dimensional Work Prize, IV Biennial of Guyana.
- 1991 – Honorable mention in sculpture, 1st National Biennial of Plastic Arts of the East, Municipal Gallery of Art, Puerto La Cruz.
