= Barnaby Phillips =

British historian and conservationist

- Born: 1968 (age 57–58)
- Education: University of Oxford; SOAS University of London
- Occupations: Historian and conservationist
- Notable work: Loot; Britain and the Benin Bronzes (2021)

Barnaby Phillips (born 1968) is a historian and conservationist. He is Senior Communications Adviser for the Elephant Protection Initiative (EPI), working to shut down the ivory trade and save Africa's elephants. Previously, he worked as a television and radio correspondent. He was a Senior Correspondent for Al Jazeera English, the 24-hour international television news channel based in Doha in Qatar, and owned by the Qatar-based Al Jazeera network. He was based in the Greek capital of Athens, and later moved to Al Jazeera's main European base in London. He was formerly with the BBC for 15 years and from 2001 was its Southern Africa Correspondent.

Phillips has extensive experience in several continents, and reported on major news stories from 1991 to 2018. His first book, Another Man's War, was published in 2014. His second book, Loot; Britain and the Benin Bronzes, was published in 2021. It tells the story of the Benin Empire (located in modern-day Nigeria), how its treasures were looted in 1897 by the British military, what happened to them next, and examines the current debate about restitution. Loot was shortlisted for the Historical Writers' Association Crown Award. The judges described it as "a balanced and expertly-written history of how the world-famous Benin bronzes were stolen and their fate, which dives deep into the moral and ethical dilemmas of museums and collectors today". His third book, The African Kingdom of Gold, Britain and the Asante Treasure, was published in March 2026, and longlisted for the Cundill History Prize. The Spectator magazine said it was "magnificent...the history is laid out with clarity and conviction".

== Early life ==
Phillips spent much of his early childhood in Kenya, East Africa, and later lived in Switzerland.

== Education ==
Phillips was educated at Bedales School, a boarding independent school in the village of Steep, near the market town of Petersfield in Hampshire in Southern England, between the years 1981 and 1986, followed by the University of Oxford, where he studied Modern History, and at the School of Oriental and African Studies at the University of London, from which he obtained a master's degree in African Politics and Economics.

== Life and career ==
Phillips has worked extensively in the Middle East, West Africa, Asia and Europe and has covered major stories such as the AIDS epidemic, the humanitarian crisis in Darfur, the war in Liberia and the 2002 Southern African food crises, the war in Iraq, the South Asian tsunami, the Greek debt crisis and the Brexit referendum.

Phillips joined the BBC's African service in 1991, remaining until 1993. He then became the BBC's stringer in Mozambique, where he learned Portuguese. In 1997, he was based in Angola for most of the year. In 1998, he became the BBC's Nigeria Correspondent, based in Lagos, Nigeria, and in 2001 was appointed Southern Africa Correspondent. Whilst at the BBC, he worked extensively in the Middle East, West Africa and Asia, and has covered major stories such as the AIDS epidemic, the humanitarian crisis in Darfur, the wars in Liberia and Iraq, the 2002 Southern African food crises, and the South Asian tsunami. He joined Al-Jazeera in 2006 and became one of its Europe Correspondents, based in Athens. He has also reported from the Balkans and from regions outside Europe, such as the Turkish/Iraq border, and on the general elections in the United States (2008) and India (2009). He moved to London in December 2010, after Al Jazeera closed its Athens bureau, to continue reporting on European news stories.

In 2011, Phillips directed and presented the documentary Burma Boy for Al Jazeera's Correspondent series. The documentary, tracing the extraordinary life of a Nigerian veteran of a Burma campaign, Isaac Fadoyebo, won a CINE Golden Eagle Award in 2012. His book Another Man's War, published in 2014, tells the same story, and also examines the legacy of British rule in Nigeria and Burma. It tells the dramatic story of the survival of Isaac Fadoyebo, a Nigerian soldier who was part of the forgotten African army that fought in Burma for the British in the Second World War. Another Man's War was described by The Daily Telegraph as a "profoundly moving" book that "ranks alongside such classics of wartime literature as The Great Escape and Darkness Be My Friend". The Spectator said it was "an extraordinary story, very well told". NPR in the United States described it as "riveting" and chose it as "one of the Best Books of 2014"'. The Times Literary Supplement said it was "impressive....a gripping military history which brings African witnesses to the dying days of the British Empire out of the shadows". Another Man's War came out in paperback in June 2015. The Guardian described it as a "lucid, exquisitely detailed" book.

Most recently, Phillips reported from the Central African Republic and Ukraine. He also played a prominent role in the reporting of the January 2015 Paris attacks, and of the Greek debt crisis. In 2016, Phillips was appointed Al Jazeera's UK correspondent, and led the coverage of the June 2016 Brexit referendum. He left Al Jazeera in 2018, to take up the post of Director of Communications with the Elephant Protection Initiative.

Phillips' second book, Loot - Britain and the Benin Bronzes was published in 2021, and was widely reviewed. Prospect Magazine listed it as one of its "Best Books of the Year". The Financial Times said it was 'gripping...a must read'. The Economist said it "adds new and much-needed context to the story of the Edo empire and its bloody finale". The Evening Standard said this "compelling book is full of African voices...balanced, sternly critical of the Brits when that is appropriate, but at the same time humane, reasonable, and ultimately optimistic." The Times Literary Supplement said it was "a balanced reconstruction of the Benin saga and probes the difficult choices facing European – and Nigerian – museums. ….Phillips excels at tracing the roundabout ways in which objects could find their way into museums." The Sunday Times said it was "perfect timing for this valuable guide to a complex narrative", The Spectator described it as a "gripping work of live history....It is the handling of this seeping undertone of racism that makes this book so valuable, a primer for the debate on colonial guilt and echoing white supremacy." In the United States, The Wall Street Journal said: "Mr. Phillips has written a humane and thoughtful book, devoid of the sort of posturing that mars the debate over the repatriation of objects brought to the West during the colonial era."

In March 2026, Phillips published his third book, The African Kingdom of Gold; Britain and the Asante Treasure (Oneworld, 2026), which examines the 19th-century plunder of gold regalia by the British from the Asante Kingdom, which is in modern-day Ghana, as well as the ongoing debate in western museums over restitution. A review by John Stevenson on Black Wall Street Media concludes: "Ultimately, The African Kingdom of Gold stands as an important contribution to the scholarship on empire, cultural heritage, and historical justice. Phillips not only informs but restores vital context to objects forcibly taken from their origins, making a compelling case for confronting the past with clarity, honesty, and rigorous research. The Times Literary Supplement praised it for 'meticulous research'., while Hyperallergic said 'Phillips's writing exemplifies the best qualities of long-form journalism with its lucid and expertly researched narrative.'
