= Redd Griffin =

American politician

Redd F. Griffin (December 3, 1938 - November 20, 2012) was a prominent member of the community of Oak Park, Illinois. He served as a member of the Illinois General Assembly from 1980 to 1983, representing the state's 21st legislative district, which included Oak Park and neighboring areas. He was a leading supporter of several local organizations in the Oak Park area, and for many years served as a trustee of Shimer College.

== Early life and education ==
As a child, Griffin lived on the grounds of the Chicago-Read Mental Health Center, then known as the Illinois State Mental Hospital, where his father was superintendent. He commuted from there to Oak Park to study at the Bishop Quarter Junior Military Academy.

Griffin attended high school for two years at the Oak Park and River Forest High School. In 1954, he left high school to attend Shimer College, a small Great Books college then located in Mount Carroll, Illinois, where he enrolled through the school's early entrance program. He attended on a scholarship from the Ford Foundation, which funded the early entrance program during this period.

Griffin left Shimer in 1958 to work in production at WTTW, Chicago's public television station. He returned to Shimer in 1959, graduating with an AB degree in 1960.

Griffin subsequently studied at the postgraduate level at Chicago State University, Northwestern University, and Columbia College of Chicago. He served in the Army Security Agency from 1961 to 1964. There he founded "Das Tor," an organization dedicated to improving understanding between Americans and Europeans.

== Political career ==
Griffin was a lifelong member of the United States Republican Party. In 1960, as a member of the Young Republicans, he co-chaired a committee dedicated to commemorating the 100th anniversary of the nomination of Abraham Lincoln for the presidency.

Griffin first took political office as a trustee of Oak Park Township in Cook County. He was appointed to the Illinois General Assembly upon the death of Rep. Vincent Molloy in 1980, won election that same year, and served as a member of the state's 81st and 82nd General Assemblies. As a member of the Illinois General Assembly, Griffin sponsored legislation dealing with local issues, including a resolution calling for a study of violence on mass transit.

== Nonprofit and educational work ==
Griffin was a member of the faculty of Triton College in River Grove, Illinois from 1997 to 2012, where he taught philosophy.

Griffin was deeply involved in the study of the local history of Oak Park. In an interview conducted with the local Oak Park newspaper a few months before his death, he said that "I want to keep the continuity with the past alive." He served as a founding trustee of several key local organizations in Oak Park, including the Frank Lloyd Wright Home and Studio Foundation, the Hemingway Foundation, and the Oak Park Visitors Center. He also served on the board of the Illinois State Historical Society, and also as a trustee of his alma mater Shimer College.

Griffin contributed to a 1999 Japanese edited volume on Hemingway titled Heminguwei no jidai : tanpen shosetsu o yomu.
