= Peter Dawson (cricketer) =

English cricketer (1946–2013)

Personal information
- Full name: John Peter Dawson
- Born: 22 August 1946; Chester, Cheshire, England
- Died: 23 November 2012 (aged 66)
- Nickname: Snicker
- Batting: Right-handed
- Bowling: Right-arm off spin

Domestic team information
- Years: Team
- 1974–1988: Shropshire

Career statistics
| Competition | List A |
|---|---|
| Matches | 6 |
| Runs scored | 40 |
| Batting average | 8.00 |
| 100s/50s | –/– |
| Top score | 16 |
| Balls bowled | 180 |
| Wickets | 4 |
| Bowling average | 37.75 |
| 5 wickets in innings | – |
| 10 wickets in match | – |
| Best bowling | 2/53 |
| Catches/stumpings | 3/– |
- Source: Cricinfo, 4 July 2011

John Peter Dawson (22 August 1946 – 23 November 2013) was an English cricketer. Dawson was a right-handed batsman who bowled right-arm off spin. He was born in Chester, Cheshire and educated in Wales at Rydal School.

Dawson made his debut for Shropshire in the 1974 Minor Counties Championship against Staffordshire. Dawson played Minor counties cricket for Shropshire from 1974 to 1988, which included 84 Minor Counties Championship appearances and 2 MCCA Knockout Trophy matches. He made his List A debut against Essex in the 1974 Gillette Cup. He made 5 further List A appearances for the county, the last of which came against Warwickshire in the 1984 NatWest Trophy. In his 6 List A matches, he scored 40 runs at an average of 8.00, with a high score of 16. With the ball, he took 4 wickets at a bowling average of 37.75, with best figures of 2/53. He played at club level in Shropshire for Shrewsbury and Ludlow, and also played at county level below first-class for Denbighshire.

He was also a rugby player who appeared in representative matches for North Wales.
