= Christian Godefroy =

Christian H. Godefroy (25 October 1948 – 17 November 2012) was a French author of self-improvement books.

Godefroy's books included Mind Dynamics, How to write a letter that sells, Time management System, Expressive learning system and Infopreneur. He also started a publishing company and founded CORESPRIT, an annual gathering of self-improvement motivators.
