= Malcolm Smith (cricketer) =

South African cricketer (1932–2012)

Personal information
- Full name: Malcolm Stanley Smith
- Born: 23 February 1932; Durban, South Africa
- Died: 9 November 2012 (aged 80); Hillcrest, South Africa
- Source: ESPNcricinfo, 22 June 2016

Malcolm Smith (23 February 1932 – 9 November 2012) was a South African cricketer. He played ten first-class matches for Natal between 1958 and 1961.
