= Erazm Ciołek (photographer) =

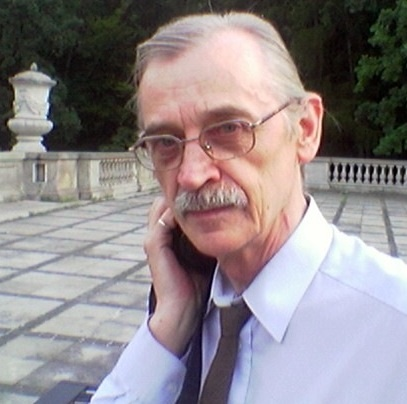
- Fot. A.T.Kijowski, Warsaw 2005
- Born: 24 June 1937; Łódź, Poland
- Died: 13 November 2012 (aged 75); Warsaw, Poland
- Resting place: Bródno Cemetery
- Occupation: Photographer

Erazm Ciołek (24 June 1937 – 13 November 2012) was a Polish photojournalist, author of many exhibitions and laureate of various awards. He is considered as the main photographer of the Solidarity movement.

== Biography ==
Ciołek was born in Łódź. In 1957, he enrolled at the Faculty of Sociology of the University of Warsaw, but he never graduated. He started to be an active journalist and photographer instead. He worked for Polityka magazine and the Polish Press Agency.

Ciołek was present in the Solidarity movement from its beginning, documenting the tumultuous events of the 1980s in Poland. He had access to the secret meetings of the Solidarity and shot his pictures as the sole photographer there.

He photographed the striking workers at the Gdańsk Shipyard; secretive meeting of the anti-communist opposition during the martial law in Poland; Solidarity demonstrations; John Paul II's pilgrimage to Poland; life in the Parish of St. Stanisław Kostka in Warsaw where the martyr priest Jerzy Popiełuszko worked and the funeral of Grzegorz Przemyk, Polish high school student murdered by the communist security forces in 1983.

After the fall of communism in 1989, Ciołek worked for Gazeta Wyborcza daily.

As well as being a Solidarity photographer, Ciołek took travel photos in Nepal, Nicaragua and Cuba. He was also the first photographer in Poland to cover the subculture of drug addicts.

Ciołek was distinguished for his works with many awards. In 2006, President Lech Kaczyński awarded him the Knight's Cross of the Order of Polonia Restituta.

He died, aged 75, in Warsaw.

== Publications ==
- Stop, kontrola: Stocznia Gdańska, sierpień 1980, 1981
- Kuba Fidela Castro, 2007
- Polska: sierpień 1980 - sierpień 1989, 1990 and 2010
