= Isaac Fadoyebo =

Nigerian soldier (1925–2012)

- Born: 5 December 1925; Emure-Ile village, Ondo State, Nigeria
- Died: 9 November 2012 (aged 86)
- Military career
- Allegiance: United Kingdom
- Branch: British Army
- Service years: 1942-1945
- Unit: Royal West African Frontier Force
- Conflicts: World War II; Burma Campaign

Isaac Fadoyebo (5 December 1925 – 9 November 2012) was a Nigerian soldier who served in the British Royal West African Frontier Force during Britain's World War II campaign in Asia.

== Early life ==
Fadoyebo was born on 5 December 1925 in Emure-Ile village, Ondo state in south west Nigeria.

In 1942, Fadoyebo voluntarily joined the British Army at the age of 16, an act which he characterised in his writings as "youthful exuberance". In January 1942 he was selected for the Royal West African Frontier Force (RWAFF) and trained as a hospital attendant. In 1943, Fadoyebo was sent to Burma. In 1943, he visited India while travelling to Burma and was deployed to police an Indian Independence rally addressed by Mahatma Gandhi.

== Career ==
In 1943, Fadoyebo was deployed by the British Army to Burma. In the early morning of February 1944, while moving by the Kaladan River valley in Japanese-occupied Burma, his unit was ambushed by Japanese forces and Fadoyebo suffered several wounds as a result of the attack. He and another soldier of the unit, David Kagbo from Sierra Leone, were the only survivors of the attack. They hid themselves in the nearby forests. They were later rescued out by Burmese villagers and sheltered in their village for 10 months. Fadoyebo in his biography described Kagbo as, "my comrade in adversity".

In December 1944, the British Gurkha brigade liberated the area and found Fadoyebo and Kagbo, both of whom were admitted in the hospital to complete their recovery before returning to their native countries.

After returning to Nigeria, Fadoyebo was encouraged by Michael Crowder (a Nigeria focused historian) to document his war experience in Burma. In the 1980s (about 35–40 years after the war) Fadoyebo typed his war account on a typewriter and was unable to find a publisher for his manuscript. Fadoyebo received his publishing break when in 1989, on the 50th anniversary of the Second World War, the BBC's Africa Service planned a series of programmes seeking first-hand accounts of Africans who participated in the war. Fadoyebo submitted the only copy of his typed manuscript which was received with excitement by the BBC and was the basis for a dramatised BBC documentary titled I remember Burma. Fadoyebo's manuscript was edited by Professor David Killingray and published in 1999 titled: "A stroke of unbelievable luck". Killingray wrote the introduction to the book; a copy of Fadoyebo's book is kept at the Imperial War Museum.

== Death ==
Fadoyebo died on 9 November 2012.

== Recognition ==
In 2011, Barnaby Phillips, a journalist with Al Jazeera, made a documentary about the unsung soldiers who fought for the British Army titled "The Burma Boys" for the Al Jazeera's Correspondent series. The documentary picturing Fadoyebo's extraordinary life won the CINE Golden Eagle Award in 2012.

In 2014, Barnaby Phillips wrote a book titled Another Man's War - The Story of a Burma Boy in Britain's Forgotten African Army which was published by Oneworld Publications.
