= Thomas K. McCraw =

American historian

Thomas Kincaid McCraw (September 11, 1940 – November 3, 2012) was an American business historian and Isidor Straus Professor of Business History, emeritus at Harvard Business School, who won the 1985 Pulitzer Prize for History for Prophets of Regulation: Charles Francis Adams, Louis D. Brandeis, James M. Landis, Alfred E. Kahn (1984), which "used biography to explore thorny issues in economics."

== Biography ==
McCraw was born in Corinth, Mississippi, near where his father John, a civil engineer for the Tennessee Valley Authority was helping to build a dam. The family moved frequently, and McCraw graduated from high school in Florence, Alabama.

McCraw attended the University of Mississippi on an ROTC scholarship, and graduated with a BA degree in 1962. He was an officer of the United States Navy in 1962–66, then went to the University of Wisconsin–Madison for his graduate studies, completing a PhD degree in 1970. He worked as a teaching assistant at the University of Wisconsin from 1967 to 1969.

McCraw was assistant professor of history (1970–74) and associate professor of history (1974–78) at the University of Texas at Austin before joining Harvard Business School in 1978, becoming a director of research in 1984–1986. At Harvard he created a standard first-year course for M.B.A. students, "Creating Modern Capitalism," which enhanced the profile and popularity of business history at the school; its syllabus became a textbook that is widely used.

Throughout his academic career, McCraw served in various positions. He served as a member of the council of the Massachusetts Historical Society, and was on the advisory board of the Nomura School of Advanced Management in Tokyo, Japan.

He married childhood sweetheart Susan Morehead in 1962, and they lived in Belmont, Massachusetts, having three children Elizabeth McCarron, Thomas McCraw Jr., and John McCraw, and three grandchildren.

McCraw died in Cambridge, Massachusetts, in 2012. He had been suffering from heart and lung problems.

== Publications and prizes ==
McCraw wrote a number of books on business and business history, including Morgan versus Lilienthal: The Feud within the TVA (1970), Prophets of Regulation: Charles Francis Adams, Louis D. Brandeis, James M. Landis, Alfred E. Kahn (1984), The Essential Alfred Chandler: Essays Towards a Historical Theory of Business (Alfred D. Chandler Jr. and Richard S. Tedlow; 1988), Creating Modern Capitalism: How Entrepreneurs, Companies, and Countries Triumphed in Three Industrial Revolutions (1997), The Intellectual Venture Capitalist: John H. McArthur and the Work of the Harvard Business School (1999), American Business, 1920-2000: How It Worked (2000), and Prophet of Innovation: Joseph Schumpeter and Creative Destruction (2007). The Founders and Finance: How Hamilton, Gallatin, and Other Immigrants Forged a New Economy (2012)

In 1985 he won the Pulitzer Prize for History for Prophets of Regulation: Charles Francis Adams, Luis D. Brandeis, James M. Landis, Alfred E. Kahn. The book also won the Thomas Newcomen Award for him in 1986. "Mr. McCraw explains sophisticated economic theory in accessible terms, and he has a historian's knack for isolating such basic American traits as a mistrust of big business and for showing how regulators manipulated these traits to implement their policies."" (The New York Times Book Review)

== Sources ==
- Brennan, Elizabeth A.; Elizabeth C. Clarage (1999). Who's who of Pulitzer Prize Winners. Westport, CT: Greenwood Publishing Group. ISBN 1-57356-111-8.
- Fischer, Heinz-Dietrich; Erika J. Fischer (1994). American History Awards 1917-1991. Munich, Germany: K. G. Saur. ISBN 3-598-30177-4.
