= M. C. Nambudiripad =

Indian popular science writer and translator

M.C. Nambudiripad
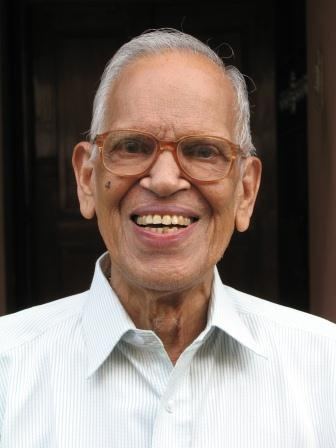
- Born: 2 February 1919; Pattambi, India
- Died: 26 November 2012 (aged 93); Trichur, Kerala, India
- Known for: Popular science writing, translation

Moothiringode Chithrabhanu Nambudiripad (2 February 1919 – 26 November 2012) was a pioneer of popular science writing in Malayalam language and an eminent translator. He was one of the founders of popular science movement in Kerala State, India. He was conferred several awards for his writing and translation, and for contribution to society.

== Birth and early education ==
M. C. Nambudiripad was born on 2 February 1919, in his ancestral home near Pattambi in Palghat district of Kerala. (Moothiringode Bhavathrāthan Namboothiripad was his eldest brother) Like any Nambudiri Brahmin boy of those times, he had six years of Vedic studies and thereafter joined the high school at Ottapalam. He studied at Zamorin's College, Calicut and graduated in physics from St. Joseph's College, Thiruchirappalli (Trichinopoly), Tamil Nadu. Decades later, he also had professional training at Public Health Laboratory, Thiruvananthapuram.

He died on 26 November 2012 aged 93 after a massive heart attack.

== Science writing ==
Nambudiripad was a recognised popular science writer in Malayalam. He was a founder member of Sasthra Sahithya Samithi, a public forum on science and science writing, formed in 1957; and of its successor body, Sasthra Sahithya Parishad. He edited two journals brought out by the Parishad, namely Sasthragathi and Eureka, for several years. He was also a regular contributor to some mainstream Malayalam periodicals, and delivered talks on popular science on All India Radio (the only broadcast medium in India then). A chapter from one of his books was part of a prescribed school text book for a long time and read by a generation.

== Early awards ==
Two of Nambudiripad's early books, The Development of Science and Through the Eyes of Science (titles translated here from Malayalam) were given awards by the then Madras government. Two other books, Autobiography of Earth and Martians received awards from the Government of India.

== Translation ==
He was also an accomplished translator. Late in life, the many years spent translating J.D.Bernal's "Science in History" into Malayalam (four volumes) won him the award for translation for 2002 from Kerala Sahithya Academy. When he was past 90, he took up translation of another book by Bernal, "The Social Function of Science"; the book was published by Sasthra Sahithya Parishad and released in Jan 2012.

Apart from books on science, he also rendered into Malayalam two novels, "The Yearling" by Marjorie Kinnan Rawlings (1956) and "Lament on the Death of a Master of Arts" by Mulkraj Anand; and autobiographies of Albert Schweitzer and Harold Russel (Victory in My Hands).

== Other awards ==
Besides being cited for his writing and translation, Nambudiripad had been conferred other awards too, like:-

- C. Achutha Menon Award 2008 (instituted in memory of Mr. Menon, who was a Chief Minister of Kerala, for achievement in social, scientific, literary and educational fields).
- Roll of Honour from Chinmaya mission.

Nambudiripad, continued to be active in writing, business, and in social and community activities right till the end.

== Bibliography ==
(This is not a complete list of M.C.Nambudiripad's works, and contains only available, confirmed information. Where available, the name of the publisher and the year of first publication are given.)

Books written by M.C.Nambudiripad

1. Sciencinte Vikaasam (The Development of Science), The Mangalodayam Ltd., Trichur, 1948.
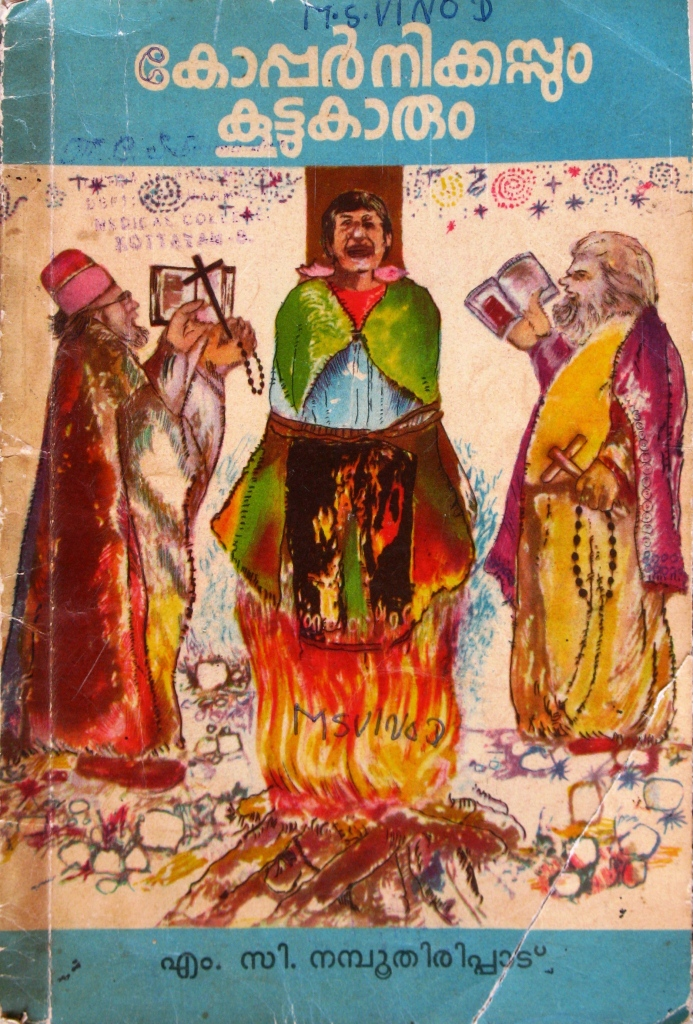
  Cover page of Copernicussum Kootukaarum
2. Saasthradrishtiyiloode (Through the Eyes of Science), Current Books, Trichur, 1950.
3. Bhoomiyude Aathmakatha (Autobiography of Earth), The Mangalodayam Ltd., Trichur, 1954.
4. Sciencinte Velichathil (In the Light of Science), National Book Stall, Kottayam, for Saahithyapravarthaka Sahakaranasangham Ltd., Kottayam, 1955. [The book includes six talks delivered on All India Radio]
5. Saasthra Sameeksha (A survey of Science), essays, The Mangalodayam Ltd., Trichur, 1967.
6. Copernicussum Kootukaarum (Copernicus and Friends), a short history of science for children, KSS Parishath, 1979.
7. Chowwaamanushyan (Martians).

Books translated from English

1. Out of My Life and Thought: An Autobiography, by Albert Schweitzer, The Mangalodayam Ltd., Trichur, 1957.
2. The World We Live In (probably the 1955 book by James Warner Watson based on a LIFE Magazine serial)
3. The Yearling, novel by Marjorie Kinnan Rawlings, 1956.
4. Victory in My Hands, by Harold Russel.
5. Lament on the Death of a Master of Arts, by Mulkraj Anand.
6. Saasthrathinte Naanaa Mukhangal (Facets of Science) – details of publisher and the original book not available.
7. Charithra Darsanam (Philosophy of Science), Best Books, Trichur, 1995. Translation of an essay by M.N.Roy published in the monthly Marxian Way in 1947. Original title not known.
8. Science in History, by J.D.Bernal, KSS Parishath, 2001.
9. The Social Function of Science, by J.D.Bernal, KSS Parishath, 2012.
