= Moosa Mangera =

South African cricketer (1945–2012)

Personal information
- Full name: Moosa Mangera
- Born: April 1945
- Died: 15 November 2012 (aged 67); Johannesburg, South Africa
- Source: ESPNcricinfo, 22 June 2016

Moosa Mangera (April 1945 – 15 November 2012) was a South African cricketer. He played 29 first-class matches for Transvaal between 1971 and 1989.
