= Daniel Goodman =

American professor

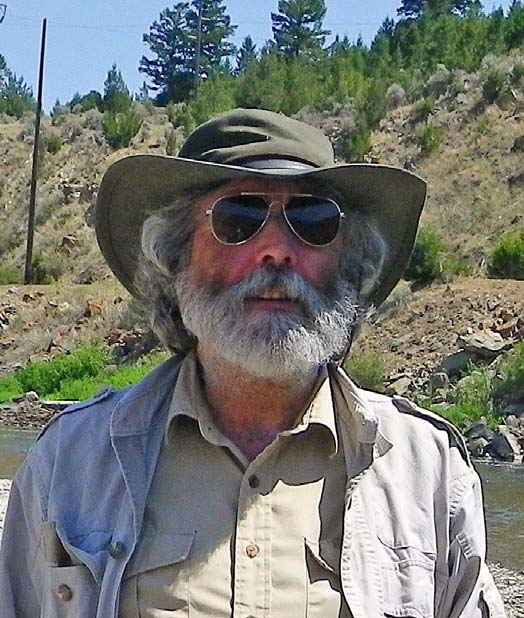
- Daniel Goodman in Montana
- Born: May 20, 1945
- Died: November 14, 2012 (aged 67)
- Occupation: Professor of Biology

Daniel Goodman (20 May 1945 – 14 November 2012) was an American professor specializing in the fields of ecology, population biology, and Bayesian statistics. He was the founder and director of the Environmental Statistics Group in the Department of Ecology at Montana State University.

== Biography ==
Goodman was born in Cincinnati, Ohio and, as a child, moved with his family to Tel Aviv, Israel where he attended high school and entered military service. Goodman returned to the United States to attend Ohio State University where he obtained a B.Sc. in biology (1966) and a Ph.D. in Zoology (1972). Goodman worked as a research associate at Cornell University (1972-1974) and taught at Scripps Institution of Oceanography (1975-1983) and Montana State University (1981-2012). He died at age 67 from complications arising in surgery to remove a spinal tumor. He is survived by his wife, Diane Brawner and daughter, Rollie Goodman.

== Work ==
Academically, Goodman is known primarily for his early career work on the relationship between diversity and stability in an ecological context and his work on life history theory. He used empirical evidence from over 200 publications to refute the then popular theory that biological diversity affects (enhances) ecological stability. His work on reproductive trade-offs in life history theory showed that the true cost of reproduction in iteroparous organisms is not only affected by changes in future survival probability, but also by changes in future reproductive capacity and that this combined effect can be measured as a change in reproductive value. Later in his career, he focused more on applied problems in conservation biology and environmental science. He is known for the application of mathematical and statistical models in studies of human impacts on marine mammals and Pacific salmon species. In one of his most cited publications in this field, he shows the importance of demographic stochasticity (chance events pertaining to births and deaths) in the probability of population extinction. Goodman served on many governmental committees and other working groups that were dedicated to conservation and environmental protection (listed below). The "Daniel Goodman Memorial Symposium" was held on 20–21 March 2014 at the Museum of the Rockies, Montana State University, Bozeman, Montana. The subject of this symposium, "Decision-making under uncertainty: risk assessment and the best available science", honors his contributions to the field of risk assessment in environmental science.

== Selected bibliography ==
- Goodman, D. (1974). "Natural selection and a cost-ceiling on reproductive effort". American Naturalist 108:247-268.
- Goodman, D. (1975). "The theory of diversity-stability relationships in ecology". Quarterly Review Biology 50:237-266.
- Goodman, D. (1979). "Regulating reproductive effort in a changing environment". American Naturalist, 735-748.
- Goodman, D. (1982). "Optimal life histories, optimal notation, and the value of reproductive value". American Naturalist 119:803-823.
- Goodman, D. (1984). "Risk spreading as an adaptive strategy in iteroparous life histories". Theoretical Population Biology, 25(1), 1-20.
- Goodman, D. (1987). "The demography of chance extinction". Viable populations for conservation, 11-34.
- Goodman, D. (2004). "Taking the prior seriously: Bayesian analysis without subjective probability". The Nature of Scientific Evidence, 379-409.

== Awards ==
- Woodrow Wilson Fellowship

== Committee Membership ==
- Board of Trustees, The Institute of Ecology 1979-82
- Condor Advisory Committee, Cal Fish & Game Commission 1981-85
- Committee of Scientific Advisors, US Marine Mammal Commission 1985-89
- Scientific Committee, International Whaling Commission 1986-88
- Science Advisory Board, US Environmental Protection Agency
- National Research Council of the National Academies
