= Luis de los Cobos =

Spanish composer (1927–2012)

Luis de los Cobos Almaraz (Valladolid, 20 April 1927 – Geneva, 16 November 2012) was a Spanish composer. In 1944, he was briefly jailed for taking part in protests against the Francoist government, and after he finished his studies in 1949 he couldn't find a job since he lacked the certificate of adherence to the Spanish State, so he went to exile, settling in Geneva after studying orchestral conducting under Bernardo Molinari in Rome and Eugène Bigot in Paris. Like Xavier Montsalvatge and Manuel Castillo he has been defined as a missing link in the postwar Spanish music, as he was influenced by Shostakovichian modernism while the Spanish scene evolved from nationalism to the Darmstadt avantgarde through his contemporaries of the 1951 Generation. He composed four operas, two symphonies, four concertos and six string quartets.

== Compositions ==
=== Opera ===
- La gloria de Don Ramiro (1975)
- Mariana Pineda (1982)
- La Pasión de Gregorio (1983)
- The Incarnation of Desire (1994)

=== Ballet ===
- Winnie the Pooh (1992)

=== Orchestral ===
==== Symphony orchestra ====
- Symphony No. 1 ″Cursus Vitae″ (1956)
- Agonía recurrente (1966)
- Symphony No. 2 ″El pinar perdido″ (2012)

==== String orchestra ====
- Jungla 1967 (1967)

==== Chamber orchestra ====
- SoJin Suite (música para un nacimiento y un bautizo) (1991)
- Cuentos de la princesita (2002)

=== Concertante ===
==== Cello ====
- Cello Concerto No. 1 (1958)
- Cello Concerto No. 2 ″De la resurrección″ (1981)

==== Piano ====
- Album del olvido (1982), for two pianos and orchestra

==== Guitar ====
- Concierto de Nerja (1991)

==== Violin ====
- Concierto de los cercos (1995)
- Rapsodia de la espera (2004)

=== Chamber music ===
==== Duos ====
- Nana de la madre pobre (1952), for cello and piano
- Elegía a las manos de una muchacha (1952), for cello and piano
- Retrato del olvido y ojos de pájaro herido (1983), for cello and piano
- Duo para violín y viola (1985)
- Sonata del cisne (2003), for violin and piano
- Nana del Campogrande (2006), for violin and piano

==== Trios ====
- Blue Talks (1987), for two pianos and percussion

==== Quartets ====
- String Quartet No. 1 ″De la pequeña muerte″ (1978)
- String Quartet No. 2 ″Una princesa de Kranach en el tren″ (1983)
- Serenata caprichosa (1987), for flute, bassoon, harp and guitar
- String Quartet No. 3 ″La nada y el mar″ (1988)
- String Quartet No. 4 ″De la ausencia″ (1993)
- String Quartet No. 5 ″Del ensueño″ (1999)
- String Quartet No. 6 ″Juego de la vida y de la muerte″ (2000)

=== Solo ===
==== Guitar ====
- Añejo mosaico (1952)

==== Violin ====
- Caprichos (1987)

==== Cello ====
- Ariana Suite (1996)

=== Choral ===
==== With orchestra ====
- Oración paralela (Requiem) (1977)
- Misa de Requiem (1996)

==== A cappella ====
- Miserere (1950)

=== Vocal ===
==== with orchestra ====
- La tierra de Alvargonzález (1951)
- Hijo del sol y de la sombra (1956)

==== with chamber ensemble ====
- Nocturno (1952)
- Hacia el Sur se fue el domingo (1966)
- Tres cuentos populares (1978)
- Cinco cantos (1981)
- Cuatro lieder para cantaor flamenco (1981)
- La destrucción o el amor (1981)
- Weinheber Lieder (1996)
- Suite Ferrández (1997)

==== with piano ====
- Canciones en el estilo popular (1950)
- Homenaje a Miguel Hernández (1952)
- La voz a tí debida (1985)

==== with other solo instrument ====
- Canciones para mezzo y guitarra (1985)
- Cuatro piezas blancas (1986), for soprano and two clarinets

=== Electronic music ===
- Suite infantil (1986)
