= John Cooper (cricketer, born 1922) =

Australian cricketer

Personal information
- Born: 11 July 1922; Lilydale, Victoria, Australia
- Died: 19 November 2012 (aged 90); Brisbane, Queensland, Australia
- Source: Cricinfo, 1 October 2020

John Cooper (11 July 1922 – 19 November 2012) was an Australian cricketer. He played in one first-class match for Queensland in 1956/57.

== See also ==
- List of Queensland first-class cricketers
