= Eldon Edge =

American politician (1926–2012)

Member of the Texas House of Representatives from the 45th district
- In office January 8, 1985 – January 8, 1991
- Preceded by: Jim Crockett
- Succeeded by: Tom Cate

Personal details
- Born: March 15, 1926 Kendalia, Texas
- Died: November 29, 2012 (aged 86) Portland, Texas
- Party: Democratic

Eldon Edge (March 15, 1926 – November 29, 2012) was an American politician who served in the Texas House of Representatives from the 45th district from 1985 to 1991.

He died on November 29, 2012, in Portland, Texas at age 86.
