= Nora Bustamante Luciani =

Venezuelan physician, historian, writer and intellectual (1924-2012)

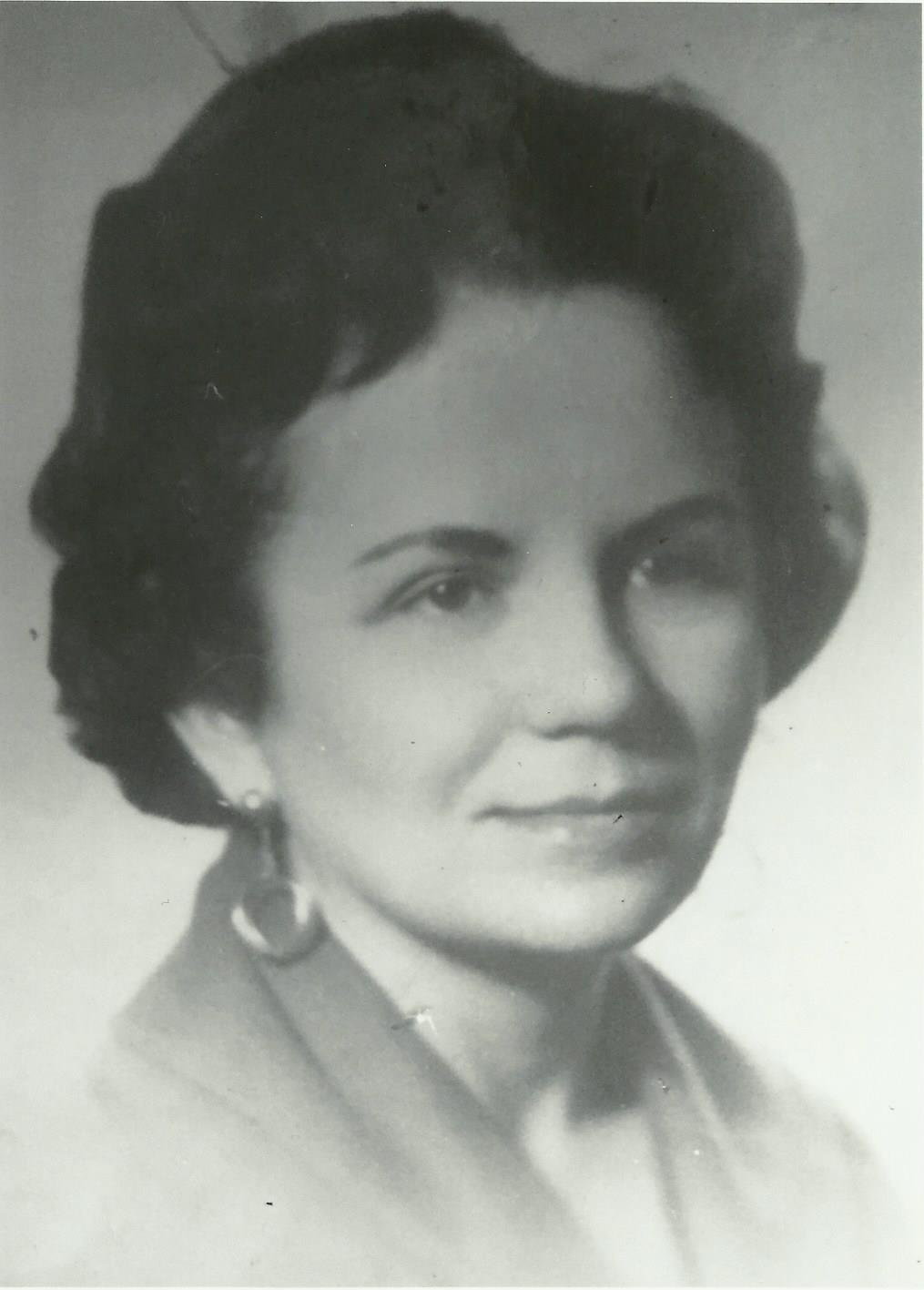
- Born: Nora María Bustamante Luciani; 24 April 1924; Maracaibo, Venezuela
- Died: 9 November 2012 (aged 88); Caracas, Venezuela
- Other names: Nora Bustamante Luciani de Fortique
- Occupation(s): physician, historian

Nora Bustamante Luciani (24 April 1924 – 9 November 2012) was a Venezuelan physician, historian, writer and intellectual, who served as the president of the Venezuelan Association of the History of Medicine, the first woman to hold the post. For 16 years she was Director of the Historical Archive of Miraflores, a dependency of the Presidential Palace that preserves the history of the presidents of Venezuela.

== Early life ==
Nora María Bustamante Luciani was born on 24 April 1924 in Maracaibo, Venezuela to Ítala Rosa Luciani Eduardo and Francisco Eugenio Bustamante de Guruceaga. As the second child of six siblings, she was descended from a family of physicians and academics. Her paternal grandfather was Francisco Eugenio Bustamante first physician to perform an oophorectomy in Venezuela, whose wife, María Concepción Urdaneta was a cousin of General Rafael Urdaneta. On her maternal side, the feminist and first woman chair in the Venezuelan National Academy of History, Lucila Luciani de Pérez Díaz was her aunt and the physician Domingo Luciani was her uncle.

Bustamante began reading at a young age and was passionate about literature and history. She completed her primary education at the Colegio Sucre in Maracaibo, and then finished her secondary schooling at the Instituto Maracaibo. She then moved to Caracas and enrolled in the medical program of the Central University of Venezuela. Between September 1944 and January 1946, she served as an intern at the Vargas Hospital and completed her degree in medical science in 1946 with her doctoral thesis Condiciones Médico-Sociales Asistenciales del Municipio Lagunilla, Estado Zulia (Medical-Social Assistance Conditions of the Lagunilla Municipality, Zulia State).

== Career ==
In 1946, Bustamante began working as a doctor for the Venezuelan Oil Concessions Service in Lagunillas Municipality, Zulia. She was the first woman to serve as a medical officer in the Venezuelan oil fields and practiced there through 1948, before returning to private practice in Maracaibo. She married a medical doctor José Rafael Fortique Lovera and the couple had two daughters: Martha and Magaly. In 1965 she founded and became the director of Semana, a literary group which met to discuss works and promote the study of national authors. She resigned as director of Semana in 1973, when she moved to Caracas and founded a second literary circle Visions, the first organization of its kind in the capital city.

Between 1979 and 1995, Bustamante served as the director of the Historical Archive of the Palace of Miraflores. During her tenure, she undertook the task of indexing the archive's Bulletin, creating the first guides for issues 1–100. Índice de los primeros cien números del Boletín del Archivo Histórico de Miraflores was published in two volumes. These were followed by Isaías Medina Angarita (1985) and Memoria de tiempos difíciles (Memory of difficult times, 1990) The books dealt with the presidency and administration of Medina, which was a favorite theme. Bustamante wrote over 70 articles about him throughout her career.

Bustamante taught library science in the School of Archivology at the Central University of Venezuela for ten years. In 1987, she was elected to hold the 7th Chair in the Venezuelan Society of Medical History (VSMH). In 1993 she founded the Ilia Rivas de Pacheco Reading Club, her third literary study group in San Cristóbal. The following year, Bustamante received the distinction of the Order "Andrés Bello", in the first degree and in 1995, she was decorated with the Order of Meritorious Work, First Class. That same year, she was named president of the Venezuelan Society of Medical History, the first woman to hold the post, which she led until 1997. In 2004, she became a member of the National Academy of History of Venezuela. In 2007, for the centennial celebration of the National Academy of Medicine, Editorial Ateproca published her doctoral thesis. That same year, Medina: Militar Civilista, gran demócrata (Medina: Military Civilian Great Democrat) was published. She remained active in the meetings and activities of the VSMH until 2011. She wrote prolifically on the history of Venezuela and participated often as a speaker or panelist in national and international forums concerning archivism, history, and medicine.

== Death and legacy ==
Bustamante died on 9 November 2012 in Caracas, having left a lasting mark on the history and archival processes of her country.
