= Bill Durkin =

American basketball player

Personal information
- Born: April 22, 1922 Illinois
- Died: November 19, 2012 (aged 90)
- Listed height: 6 ft 1 in (1.85 m)
- Listed weight: 160 lb (73 kg)

Career information
- College: Loyola Chicago (1940–1943)
- Playing career: 1942–1945
- Position: Guard
- Coaching career: 1943–1955

Career history

Playing
- 1942–1943: Chicago Ramblers
- 1942–1943: Detroit Eagles
- 1945: Sheboygan Red Skins

Coaching
- 1943–1955: Mount Carmel HS

William Joseph Durkin (April 22, 1922 – November 19, 2012) was an American professional basketball player. He played in the National Basketball League in one game for the Sheboygan Red Skins during the 1944–45 season. He also competed for numerous other teams in independent leagues. His grandson, Bobby Durkin, plays college basketball for the Minnesota Golden Gophers.
