= Clifford Digre =

US businessman

Clifford Benjamin Digre (May 26, 1923 – November 25, 2012) was an American entrepreneur. He was the founder of MISCO, Minneapolis Speaker Company, and was President of the Association of Loudspeaker Manufacturing & Acoustics International (ALMA, now known as ALTI) from 1972 to 1974.

== Early life ==
Digre was born in Hendricks, Minnesota, a township in southwestern Minnesota, to two parents of Norwegian descent. His father, Peder, died in a car accident when Cliff was five, leaving his mother widowed with four older children to support. Digre graduated from Hendricks High School in 1941.

In 1943, Digre was drafted into the Army Air Corps, later the US Air Force, to fight in the European theatre of World War II. In the Signal Corps Radio School after basic training, Digre was drawn to radio operating, an interest that carried into his professional career. He was stationed at RAF Glatton as a member of 457th Bombardment Group in Conington, Cambridgeshire, England. Digre flew 24 combat missions as a ball turret gunner from September 1944 to April 1945 before receiving an honorable discharge in October 1945.

== Career ==
In 1947, Digre continued his education from the US Air Force by attending the National Radio School in Minneapolis. The inspiration to found Minneapolis Speaker Company occurred after he brought a radio to class whose sound had been distorted within the first minutes of playing. His instructor concluded the loudspeaker inside was defective and needed to either be completely rebuilt or replaced. Rebuilding was the cheaper option, but there was only one shop in the state which could do it. They were backlogged for weeks and then lost the speaker, forcing Digre to buy a new one. It was then that Digre concluded the shop needed competition and began the Minneapolis Speaker Reconing Company in 1949. By 1956, the company had begun manufacturing loudspeakers and changed the name to MISCO, Minneapolis Speaker Company.

== Patents ==
Digre has three patents in his name from the US Patent and Trademark Office. All three pertain to magnet assemblies or dust shields:

- US3492443: Dust shield and pressure element for magnet assembly
- US4293741: Magnet assembly
- US3898393: Magnet centering device and shield

== ALMA Foundation ==
Digre was a founding member of the Association of Loudspeaker Manufacturing & Acoustics International (ALMA, now ALTI) in 1964 to support American loudspeaker engineers and manufacturers. He served as the organization's president from 1972 to 1974 and as a board member emeritus through 2011. During his presidency, ALMA expanded membership by moving the organization away from serving company owners and trade matters toward engineering and technical exchange. Digre also received the inaugural Gold Driver Award in 2011, recognizing lifelong contributions to ALTI and American loudspeaker manufacturing.

== Personal life ==
Digre married Bernice Hoversten in 1947 and remained married until his death in 2012. They have four children, two of whom, Daniel Digre and Carrie Murphy, continue to work at MISCO as CEO and CFO, respectively.
