= Razaullah Khan =

Pakistani cricketer (1937–2012)

Personal information
- Born: 9 September 1937; Sukkur, British Raj
- Died: 5 November 2012 (aged 75); Karachi, Pakistan
- Batting: Right-handed
- Role: Wicketkeeper
- Source: ESPNcricinfo, 23 June 2016

Razaullah Khan (9 September 1937 – 5 November 2012) was a Pakistani cricketer. A right-handed batsman and wicketkeeper, he played 24 first-class matches for several domestic teams in Pakistan between 1957 and 1973.

== Biography ==
Razaullah Khan was born on 9 September 1937 in Sukkur, British India. He died on 5 November 2012 in Karachi, Pakistan.
