= Prophets of Regulation =

1984 book by Thomas K. McCraw

- Author: Thomas K. McCraw
- Publisher: Belknap
- Publication date: 1984
- Pages: 416 pp.
- ISBN: 9780674716087

Prophets of Regulation: Charles Francis Adams, Louis D. Brandeis, James M. Landis, Alfred E. Kahn is a book by American business historian Thomas K. McCraw, published in 1984, which won the 1985 Pulitzer Prize for History.

The book is about the American trade and industry regulation history, profiling Charles Francis Adams, Louis D. Brandeis, James M. Landis, and Alfred E. Kahn. “McCraw explains sophisticated economic theory in accessible terms, and he has a historian’s knack for isolating such basic American traits as a mistrust of big business and for showing how regulators manipulated these traits to implement their policies.” (New York Times Book Review)
