= Herman Bank =

American mechanical engineer

Herman Bank (October 26, 1916 – November 2, 2012) was an American mechanical engineer who worked for the Jet Propulsion Laboratory (JPL) from 1947 to 1984. He was one of the “Rocket Boys,” who were first-generation scientists and engineers of the Space Age.

While working at JPL, Bank worked as a mechanical engineer on the Bumper Project, supervised the structural design for Explorer 1, and served as supervisor on the Ranger and Surveyor missions to the Moon.

In retirement, Bank founded the Volunteer Professionals for Medical Advancement, a group of JPL and Caltech retirees that work with doctors to develop new medical technologies.

== Early years ==
Herman Bank was born in Vineland, New Jersey, to Russian-Jewish immigrants Sophie and Max Bank. Bank's formal education began with an Associate of Arts degree from Los Angeles City College in engineering. In 1935, he earned a degree from the University of California, Berkeley, in mechanical engineering. Bank married Irene Gross in 1943 and had three sons: Sidney, Ronald, and Michael.

== Career ==
Herman Bank joined JPL in 1947 as a mechanical engineer. One of his first assignments was to work with German scientist Wernher von Braun on the Bumper Project (AKA Bumper Missile Program). Bank was of Jewish heritage, and refused to shake the hand of or socialize with the ex-Nazi von Braun. However he was very interested in the Bumper Project and agreed to work with von Braun on it. The Bumper Project was a two-stage missile program that resulted in the first man-made object to reach extraterrestrial space, setting a record altitude of 250 miles. Bank supervised the structural design for Explorer 1, which launched January 31, 1958, and became America's first satellite. Eventually Bank worked as supervisor on the Ranger and Surveyor missions to the Moon.

In the 1970s Bank developed a joint program with Cal Tech, JPL, NASA, and Los Angeles area hospitals, which allowed him to work on medical advancements that were of particular interest to him. This collaborative program goal was to develop innovative solutions to medical challenges including development of a bag that increased the shelf life of stored blood and an improved X-ray technique that eliminated multiple exposures.

== Retirement ==
Herman Bank initially wanted to attend medical school, but he was not able to afford the lengthy education and choose to pursue mechanical engineering instead. Upon retirement in 1983, Bank decided to nurture his interest in the medical field and formed the Volunteer Professionals for Medical Advancement (VPMA).

VPMA was established in 1996 by Bank and works with doctors and hospitals to advance current medical technologies and develop new ones. It has been responsible for:

- Design of an automated oxygen enrichment system for premature babies. Working with Los Angeles County/USC Medical Center, retired volunteers and doctors worked to remove the inaccuracies of manually controlled oxygen systems, which can affect the infant's eyesight, brain and lung development.
- Solving a blood clot problem found with a stent that could cause heart attacks. Retired professional volunteers introduced a special electropolishing process to provide a super-smooth stent surface. The electropolishing process, developed in the aerospace industry, is not well known by doctors. The resulting electropolished stent practically eliminated further blood clot formation with the device.
- Creation of an advanced-database private computer network for pediatricians. Working with Children's Hospital Los Angeles, retired professionals helped pediatricians nationwide to correspond about children's illnesses using JPL's method of data management. This database provided a depository for historical data of diagnoses, research, treatments and results. Doctors estimated that extended medical use of the computer database systems could reduce health care costs by 20 to 30 percent.

== Other notable accomplishments ==
Inspired by his surfing sons and the California surf lifestyle, Bank invented the Multiboard in 1964. The Multiboard was a bisected long board and solved the transport issues that long boards posed. The original prototype was crafted from a Hobie long board (donated by Hobie Alter). Two of Bank's Multiboards were taken on Bruce Brown's film epic, The Endless Summer in the event that small planes were unable to transport the long boards used in the movie.

== Present ==
Herman Bank lived in Altadena, California, with his wife of sixty-seven years Irene.
