= Kyrillos Oikonomopoulos =

Greek Orthodox bishop

Kyrillos Oikonomopoulos (Greek: Κύριλλος Οικονομόπουλος; 1930 in Kritou Marottou, Paphos District – 18 November 2012) was the Greek Orthodox bishop of Zimbabwe in 2001–2002.

He graduated the Theological Faculty of the University of Athens in 1965. He was ordained as a deacon in 1949 and as a priest in 1965.

Since 14 March 2003 he held the title of Metropolitan of Naukratis. Little later he returned to Paphos as a complainant and worked in the Metropolitan District of Paphos.

Metropolitan Kyrillos had been infected for the month and hospitalized in the Intensive Care Unit of the General Hospital of Limassol where he passed 18 November 2012.
