= Mükerrem Kamil Su =

Turkish writer

Mükerrem Kamil Su (Bursa, 1906–1984) was a Turkish writer. Born in Bursa to Muhacir parents from Bulgaria, she graduated in 1922. She worked as a teacher and wrote several novels, mostly about love, passion and adventure. Later, together with the historian Ahmet Mumcu, she wrote an historical work about the Turkish War of Independence. Her first marriage was with Sadi Tanaydı, an agricultural engineer and her second with the historian, Kamil Su.

== Works ==
List of her works:

- Türkiye Cumhuriyeti İnkılap Tarihi ve Atatürkçülük (History of Turkish Revolution and Kemalism), with Ahmet Mumcu and Hamiyet Bican, 1981
- Türkiye Cumhuriyeti tarihi (History of the Republic of Turkey), 1972
- Gençliĝimin rüzgarı (Wind of my youth), novel, 1955
- Karakız (Black girl), autobiography, 1977
- Aynadaki kız (Girl in the mirror), 1962
