= Omry Ronen =

American Slavist (1937–2012)

- Born: Imre Szörényi; July 12, 1937; Odessa, Ukrainian SSR, Soviet Union
- Died: November 1, 2012 (aged 75); Ann Arbor, Michigan, U.S.
- Education: Budapest University; Hebrew University of Jerusalem (BA); Harvard University (PhD)
- Occupation: Slavist

Omry Ronen (born Imre Szörényi; July 12, 1937 – November 1, 2012) was an American Slavist, known for his works on the Silver Age of Russian Poetry and especially on the poetry of Osip Mandelstam.

== Biography ==
Ronen was born in Odessa in 1937 into a Hungarian Jewish family. His father was the biochemist Emerich (Imre) Szörényi (January 12, 1905 – January 17, 1959), known for his work on muscle physiology. From 1934 to 1953, the family lived in the Soviet Union, where Emerich Szörényi headed the tissue protein research department of the Institute of Biochemistry and the biochemistry department of the Institute of Microbiology of the Ukrainian Academy of Sciences. In 1950, he was appointed head of the newly established Institute of Biochemistry in Hungary, however, he was only able to return to Hungary with his family in 1953.

Ronen started his undergraduate studies in Budapest University. He took part in the 1956 Hungarian Revolution, and fled to Israel after the uprising was suppressed. He obtained his B.A. in linguistics and English literature from Hebrew University and his PhD in Slavic languages and literatures from Harvard. From 1972 to 1985, he was professor at Hebrew University. In 1985 he became a Professor of Slavic Languages and Literatures at the University of Michigan, Ann Arbor where he remained until his death.

== Work ==
The works of Omry Ronen on the Silver Age of Russian Poetry include Ronen (1983) and Ronen (2000). Ronen also made important contributions to the study of Pushkin's poetics, the poetry of the Oberiu, Vladimir Nabokov, and numerous other topics.

Ronen is also the author of three books of essays based on his column "From the Town of Ann”, a punning allusion to the literary trope of "the town of N" (or "NN") and the "Ann" from "Ann Arbor," in the journal "Zvezda".

== Selected works ==
- Ronen, O. (1983). An Approach to Mandel'shtam. Jerusalem: The Magnes Press of the Hebrew University.
- Ronen, O. (2000). Серебряный век как умысел и вымысел. Moscow: O.G.I.
