= Harvey Tristan Cropper =

American-Swedish painter (1931–2012)

- Born: August 4, 1931; Sugar Hill, Harlem, New York City, U.S.
- Died: November 15, 2012 (aged 81); Stockholm, Sweden
- Education: Art Students League of New York
- Occupation: Artist
- Known for: Painting

Harvey Tristan Cropper (August 4, 1931 – November 15, 2012) was an American painter, born in New York City, who in the 1980s moved to Stockholm, Sweden, where he died at the age of 81.

== Life ==
Cropper was born on August 4, 1931, in Sugar Hill, Harlem, New York City, to West Indian parents who had migrated there from St. Vincent. His father was a pharmacist and his mother was an embroiderer in Harlem. Cropper started creating art at the age of four, and was inspired by the many colors of his mother's silk threads. He studied at the Art Students League of New York, and spent time in private study in Japan. In the early 1950s, while living at 4 Barrow Street in New York's Greenwich Village with the jazz musician Charlie Parker, Cropper taught Parker how to paint in exchange for music lessons.

In 1954, Cropper exhibited his work at the Galerie Moderne. In 1964, his work was part of the 10 American Negro Artists Living and Working in Europe exhibition at Den Frie Udstilling in Copenhagen, Denmark.

During the Vietnam War, Cropper began to focus on political paintings. His piece "Faces of Apartheid" was used by the United Nations.

In the 1970s, Cropper's artistic style began to focus more on meditative creation and still life. In a conversation with Swedish artist and friend Bengt O. Björklund, he explained: "Light, texture and symbolism are important to me. I have become more meditative and once again approached the Japanese tradition and the values Zen stands for."

In 1981, Cropper moved to Stockholm, Sweden, where he spent the rest of his life working in an open studio with other artists. He died in Stockholm from cancer in 2012, aged 81.
