= Alan Coxon (cricketer) =

English cricketer

Personal information
- Full name: Alan John Coxon
- Born: 18 March 1930; Clapton, London
- Died: 7 November 2012 (aged 82); Honiton, Devon
- Batting: Left-handed
- Bowling: Left-arm fast-medium

Domestic team information
- Years: Team
- 1951–1954: Oxford University
- 1978: Buckinghamshire

Career statistics
Competition	First-class
Matches	18
Runs scored	144
Batting average	12.00
100s/50s	0/0
Top score	43*
Balls bowled	2,364
Wickets	28
Bowling average	48.21
5 wickets in innings	0
10 wickets in match	0
Best bowling	3/55
Catches/stumpings	4/–
- Source: Cricinfo, 12 May 2011

Alan John Coxon (18 March 1930 – 7 November 2012) was an English cricketer. Coxon was a left-handed batsman who bowled left-arm fast-medium.

Coxon was born in Clapton, London, and educated at Harrow County School for Boys and Lincoln College, Oxford.

Coxon made his first-class debut for Oxford University against the Free Foresters in 1951. He played 16 further first-class matches for the university, the last coming against Hampshire in 1954. In his 17 first-class matches for the university, he scored 143 runs at a batting average of 11.91, with a high score of 43*. With the ball he took 26 wickets at a bowling average of 49.73, with best figures of 3/55. In 1958, he made his final first-class appearance when he appeared for the Marylebone Cricket Club against Oxford University.

Twenty years later, he appeared in a single Minor Counties Championship match for Buckinghamshire against Berkshire, having previously played for the Essex Second XI in the competition from 1951 to 1952.

After university, Coxon joined the Guinness brewing company and ran their Nigerian company. Later he was a main board director.
