= Samuel Guo Chuan-zhen =

Samuel Guo Chuan-zhen (Chinese: 郭傳真; April 14, 1918 – November 6, 2012) was the auxiliary bishop of the Roman Catholic Archdiocese of Jinan, China.

Ordained a bishop without papal mandate in 1988, he later received it. Guo Chuan-zhen also established a seminary.
