= Frank Pittman =

American psychiatrist and author (1935–2012)

- Born: July 11, 1935; United States
- Died: November 24, 2012 (aged 77); Atlanta, Georgia, U.S.
- Known for: Private Lies: Infidelity and Betrayal of Intimacy; Man Enough: Fathers, Sons and the Search for Masculinity
- Scientific career
- Fields: Psychiatry, psychology, family therapy, psychotherapy, relationship education

Frank Smith Pittman III, M.D. (July 11, 1935 – November 24, 2012) was an American psychiatrist and author. He wrote a regular column, "Ask Dr. Frank", which used to appear in Psychology Today.

During his lifetime, he was a "widely quoted author" of Man Enough: Fathers, Sons and the Search for Masculinity and Private Lies: Infidelity and Betrayal of Intimacy. He was also author of books Grow Up!: How Taking Responsibility Can Make You a Happy Adult, and Turning Points: Treating Families in Transition and Crisis.

Dr. Pittman practiced out of Atlanta, Georgia, where he was active as a psychiatrist and family therapist from 1962 until his death in 2012. Both of Dr. Pittman's daughters are psychologists.

Infidelity was a central focus of Dr. Pittman's work. In a 1993 article for Psychology Today.

In 2003, Dr. Pittman was recognized with the Smart Marriages Impact Award at the annual conference of the Coalition for Marriage, Family and Couples Education.

Dr. Pittman died at his Atlanta home on November 24, 2012, of cancer. He is survived by his wife of 52 years, Betsy Pittman, two daughters, Dr. Tina Wagers of Boulder, CO., and Dr. Virginia Pistilli of Portola, CA.; a son, Frank S. Pittman IV of Atlanta, GA; a sister, Joanna Fox of Cashiers, NC, and seven grandchildren.

== Education ==
- Research, Community Mental Health, Family Therapy, Denver, Colorado, from a grant from the National Institute of Mental Health
- Medical Residency, psychiatry, Emory University

== Publications ==
=== Books ===
- Turning Points: Treating Families in Transition and Crisis, Frank Pittman, M.D., A Norton Professional Book, (Hardcover), W. W. Norton & Company; 1st ed edition, May 1987, ISBN 0-393-70040-2, ISBN 978-0-393-70040-4, W W Norton page
- Private Lies: Infidelity and Betrayal of Intimacy, Frank Pittman, M.D., W. W. Norton & Company; Reprint edition November 1990, ISBN 0-393-30707-7, ISBN 978-0-393-30707-8, W W Norton page
- Mentiras Privadas (Spanish edition), Amorrortu Editores, September 1994, ISBN 950-518-543-X, ISBN 978-950-518-543-6
- Man enough: fathers, sons and the search for masculinity, Frank Pittman, M.D., Perigee Trade; Reprint edition October 1, 1994, ISBN 0-399-51883-5, ISBN 978-0-399-51883-6
- Grow Up!: How Taking Responsibility Can Make You a Happy Adult, Golden Guides from St. Martin's Press, ISBN 1-58238-040-6, ISBN 978-1-58238-040-7, July 30, 1999

=== Articles ===
- "How to be a Grownup Even Around Your Own Parents", Psychotherapy.net, October 2002.
- "Beware Older Women Ahead," Psychology Today, January 1, 1999.
- "How to Manage Your Kids," Psychology Today, May 1, 1995.
- "How to Manage Mom and Dad," Psychology Today, November 1, 1994.
- "Ask Dr. Frank", Psychology Today, May/June 1994 issue.
- "Ask Dr. Frank", Psychology Today, March/April 1994 issue.
- "A Buyer's Guide to Psychotherapy," Psychology Today, January 1, 1994.
- "Fathers and Sons," Psychology Today, September 1, 1993.
- "Beyond Betrayal: Life After Infidelity," Psychology Today, May 1, 1993.
- Google Scholar articlesGoogle Scholar

=== Presentations ===
- "What are Men for, Anyway?", Reno, Nevada, June 28, 2003, Keynote Address, Smart Marriages Conference
- Response to "The Death of 'Till Death Us Do Part': "Marriage in the 20th Century", July 2002, Keynote Address, Smart Marriages Conference
- Myth and Ritual in American Life, A Sloan Center for Working Families, "Ritual Function and Family Dysfunction: The Therapist's View", Emory University

== See also ==
- Psychotherapy
- Family therapy
- Mental health
- Relationship education
