= Naima Bayari =

Moroccan kickboxer

- Born: Fez, Morocco
- Died: November 13, 2012
- Native name: نعيمة البياري
- Nationality: Moroccan
- Style: Muay Thai

Naima Bayari (Arabic: نعيمة البياري) was a Moroccan Muay Thai kickboxer, who was born in Fez, Morocco, and moved to Nador to practice her sport. She died on November 13, 2012, after a gas leak occurred in her residence in the Al-Kindi neighborhood of Nador. She belonged to the country league Kick Sport Thai Boxing, and she won several Moroccan championships for the Muayi Tai twice, and has participated in many international meetings in Spain and Italy.

== See also ==
- Badr Hari
- Mustapha Lakhsem
- Khalid Rahilou
- Moroccan Olympic Committee
