= Private Lies (book) =

1989 book by Frank Pittman

Private Lies: Infidelity and Betrayal of Intimacy
- Private Lies, book cover (Hardcover ed.)
- Author: Frank Pittman, M.D.
- Cover artist: Margaret M. Wagner (book design)
- Language: English
- Subject: infidelity, intimacy, marriage, relationships
- Genre: family therapy, psychiatry
- Publisher: W. W. Norton & Company
- Publication date: 1989
- Publication place: United States
- Media type: Hardcover
- Pages: 320
- ISBN: 0-393-02634-5
- OCLC: 17954463
- Dewey Decimal: 306.7/36 19
- LC Class: HQ806 .P57 1989
- Preceded by: Turning Points: Treating Families in Transition and Crisis 1987
- Followed by: Man enough: fathers, sons and the search for masculinity 1994, Grow Up!: How Taking Responsibility Can Make You a Happy Adult 1999

Private Lies: Infidelity and Betrayal of Intimacy is a non-fiction book by psychiatrist and family therapist Frank Pittman, M.D. Private Lies was first published in hardcover edition in 1989 by W. Then, W. Norton & Company by the same publisher in a paperback edition in 1990.

Dr. Pittman's book has been referred to as "widely quoted", by Psychology Today. It has been cited by 24 other books on marriage and family therapy counseling.

== Books by Frank Pittman ==
- Turning Points: Treating Families in Transition and Crisis, Frank Pittman, M.D., A Norton Professional Book, (Hardcover), W. W. Norton & Company; 1st ed edition, May 1987, ISBN 0-393-70040-2, ISBN 978-0-393-70040-4
- Private Lies: Infidelity and Betrayal of Intimacy, Frank Pittman, M.D., W. W. Norton & Company; Reprint edition November 1990, ISBN 0-393-30707-7, ISBN 978-0-393-30707-8
- Mentiras Privadas (Spanish edition), Amorrortu Editores, September 1994, ISBN 950-518-543-X, ISBN 978-950-518-543-6
- Man enough: fathers, sons and the search for masculinity, Frank Pittman, M.D., Perigee Trade; Reprint edition October 1, 1994, ISBN 0-399-51883-5, ISBN 978-0-399-51883-6
- Grow Up!: How Taking Responsibility Can Make You a Happy Adult, Golden Guides from St. Martin's Press, ISBN 1-58238-040-6, ISBN 978-1-58238-040-7, July 30, 1999

== See also ==
- Psychotherapy
- Family therapy
- Mental health
- Infidelity
