= William Brandon Lacy Campos =

American poet and activist

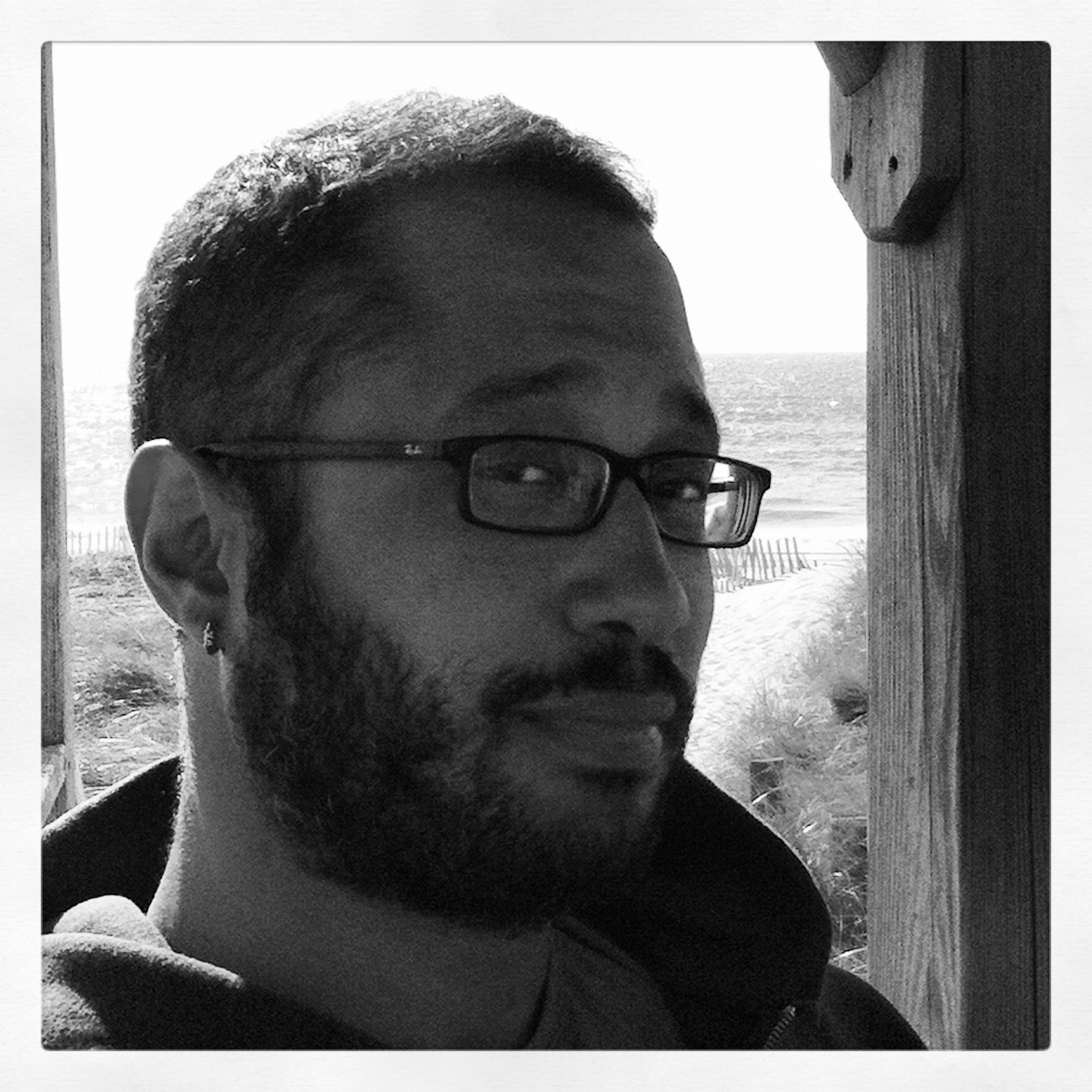
- Born: August 31, 1977; Duluth, Minnesota, U.S.
- Died: November 9, 2012 (aged 35); New York City, U.S.
- Education: University of Minnesota

William Brandon Lacy Campos (August 31, 1977 – November 9, 2012) was an American poet, writer, columnist, LGBT and HIV/AIDS activist. He authored the poetry collection It Ain't Truth If It Doesn't Hurt and his writings were included in books and poetry anthologies. He was HIV-positive from his mid-20s and spoke about his serostatus, his methamphetamine addiction and his experiences as a person of color.

As an activist, Campos was a board member of the Audre Lorde Project and co-executive director of Queers for Economic Justice. He co-chaired the Queer Student Coalition of the United States Student Association and worked for the Center for Media Justice. He was also a regular presenter at the National LGBTQ Task Force's Creating Change Conference.

== Early life and education ==
Campos was born on August 31, 1977, in Duluth, Minnesota, to Deborah Carey Watt and William Edward Lacy. His great-great uncle was the Black historian Carter G. Woodson, the second Black man to be awarded a doctorate from Harvard University and the founder of Black History Month.

Campos attended schools in Minneapolis and graduated from Camden High School in 1995, where he was a member of the student council. Campos continued his education at the Warren Wilson College in Swannanoa, North Carolina, the University of Puerto Rico, Río Piedras, and the University of Minnesota where he received a bachelor's degree in political science.

== Advocacy career ==
Campos became co-chair of the National Queer Student Coalition at the age of 20.

His career included work at the Center for Media Justice in Oakland, California, where he was also the founding chair (term of office from February 2003 to December 31, 2004) of the Lavender Greens, the Green Party LGBT Identity Caucus.

Campos was a regular presenter and participant at the National LGBTQ Task Force's annual Creating Change Conference. He co-chaired the United States Student Association's Queer Student Coalition. He was also a graduate of the Task Force Youth Leadership Training Institute in 1999.

In his final years, Campos became the co-executive director of Queers for Economic Justice, where he worked on LGBTQ issues of social justice in New York City. He was a board member of the Audre Lorde Project and was involved in supporting the Hetrick-Martin Institute. Campos joined Volttage.com, a dating site aimed at eliminating stigma and providing support to the HIV-positive community, as a support, model and spokesman.

Campos was HIV-positive from his mid-20s and spoke extensively about his serostatus, his experience and reflection as a man of color, as well as his recovery from addiction to crystal meth. He wrote about his love for food, political and social justice, and his reflections on life. He described himself as "a poet, playwright, journalist, amateur chef and life commentator doing his bit to put his foot in the asses of the regressive masses, while putting filling and nutritious food on plates of folks that ain't got much and deserve better."

Campos died on November 9, 2012, in New York City.

== Publications, blogs, and poetry ==
Campos was the author of the blog My Feet Only Walk Forward. He was a co-contributor to the Huffington Post, discussing Black masculinity, image, perception and stigma. He also contributed a regular column in The Body entitled "Queer, Poz and Colored".

A poet, he was the author of the volume of poetry It Ain't Truth If It Doesn't Hurt with illustrations by David Berube from his Face a Day collection. The volume was published in July 2011. He published poetry in the literary journal Ganymede in 2008. Campos created the Alfred C. Carey Prize in Spoken Word Poetry in honor of his grandfather. He contributed to the poetry collection Mariposas: A Modern Anthology of Queer Latino Poetry, published in October 2008.

Campos was a contributor to Beyond Resistance! Youth Activism and Community Change: New Democratic Possibilities for Practice and Policy for America's Youth, published in March 2006. He wrote about being "the only non-PhD candidate" to have written a chapter in an edited collection called Queer Twin Cities: Twin Cities GLBT Oral History Project. He also contributed to the anthology From Macho To Mariposa: New Gay Latino Fiction, published in March 2011.

== Political and social engagement ==
In a keynote speech in November 2012 at Tufts University for a Black Solidarity Day Rally, he tackled a recurrent theme in his life — his status as a multi-racial man:

I am standing in front of you a black, white, Ojibwe, Afro-Boricua, HIV-positive queer man, he said. And I am just as black as any of you… No more high yellow and midnight blue conversations when talking about skin unless it's to talk about how that high yellow or midnight blue person rocked your socks last night after that party and you are about to take his or her last name. I could give a damn about the style you wear your hair, fried died and laid to the side or afro-tastic, I am with Miss India.Arie, I am not my hair!

In a speech in 2012 at the Civil Liberties and Public Policy Conference at Hampshire College, he called for HIV to be a central concern of the movement for reproductive freedom:

HIV isn't over. It's relevant to your work. It's relevant to your lives. It is not just a disease that affects white gay men. It isn't a disease that impacts only men of color on the down-low. In fact, it isn't a disease that impacts only men. Women, and specifically women of color, and even more specifically African-American and Latina women, are the fastest-growing population of people living with HIV. And with 300,000 women living with HIV in the United States and women representing more than 50% of HIV cases around the world, you cannot in justice or in faith remove issues of HIV from reproductive justice.
