= David Speer =

American businessman

David B. Speer
- Born: April 6, 1951; Sault Ste. Marie, Ontario, Canada
- Died: November 17, 2012 (aged 61); Chicago, Illinois
- Occupation: CEO of Illinois Tool Works (2005–2012)

David Blakeney Speer (April 6, 1951 – November 17, 2012) was an American businessman, best known as the CEO of Illinois Tool Works from 2005 to 2012.

== Early life ==
Speer was born in Sault Ste. Marie, Ontario, the third of seven children. His father, Richard N. Speer Sr. was a metallurgical engineer educated at Queens University, Canada who held various management positions with Chromium Mining & Smelting, Calumet & Hecla Corp. eventually became an executive vice president with Universal Oil Products (UOP). The family moved around frequently, spending several years living in Memphis, Spokane, Homewood, Illinois, and Selma, Alabama, before settling in Barrington, Illinois, in 1967.

== Education ==
Speer attended Vanderbilt University after graduating high school in Barrington and transferred to Iowa State University after two years, where he earned a degree in industrial engineering in 1973. In 1977, he earned a master's degree in management from Northwestern University.

== Career ==
Speer began his career working for Precision Paper Tube in Wheeling, Illinois, and was hired in 1978 by Illinois Tool Works as a marketing manager. He held a variety of different positions during his 34-year career with the company, and was named CEO in 2005, and chairman of the board in 2006, succeeding Jim Farrell.
