= Peter B. Dews =

American psychologist and pharmacologist

Peter B. Dews (1922–2012) was an American psychologist and pharmacologist. He is credited as the principal founder of the discipline of behavioral pharmacology.
