= György Danis =

Hungarian politician (1945–2012)

Member of the National Assembly
- In office 2 May 1990 – 17 June 1998

Personal details
- Born: 15 June 1945 Kéty, Hungary
- Died: 8 November 2012 (aged 67) Budapest, Hungary
- Party: SZDSZ (since 1988)
- Other political affiliations: MDF (1988)
- Profession: physician, politician

Dr. György Danis (15 June 1945 – 8 November 2012) was a Hungarian physician and politician, member of the National Assembly (MP) from SZDSZ National List between 1990 and 1998.
