= Mükerrem Hiç =

Turkish politician

Prof. Dr. Mükerrem Hiç
- Mükerrem Hiç
- Born: August 29, 1929; Istanbul, Turkey
- Died: November 3, 2012 (aged 83); Istanbul, Turkey
- Occupations: Professor of Economics and Political Economy, Member of Parliament
- Spouse: Prof. Dr. Süreyya Hiç
- Children: Assoc. Prof. Dr. Ayşen Hiç Gencer and Assoc. Prof. Dr. Özlen Hiç

Academic background
- Education: Istanbul University

Academic work
- Discipline: Economics
- Sub-discipline: Monetary Theory, Macroeconomics, Political Economy

Hüseyin Mükerrem Hiç (29 August 1929 – 3 November 2012) was a Turkish professor of economics and political economy at Istanbul University, Istanbul, Turkey, with former posts at Harvard University, Princeton University and Columbia University. He also served as a member of Grand National Assembly of Turkey between 1983 and 1987.

== Career ==
Mükerrem Hiç began his academic career at Istanbul University, Faculty of Economics in 1953 as a teaching assistant while studying for his Ph.D. title at the same department. In 1955-1956, he attended Harvard University's Harvard Business School under a special one year MBA program. In 1956-1957 he taught Managerial Accounting at Harvard University. After returning to Istanbul University, he obtained his Ph.D. in economics in 1958.

From 1958 to 1962 he was assistant professor at Istanbul University, Faculty of Economics. He received his tenure and became associate professor in 1962 and continued to teach at Istanbul University. In his sabbatical year of 1964-1965 he taught at Princeton University under a special scholarship program. After returning to Turkey, he became full professor in 1968.

In his tenure as a professor, he held many visiting professor posts, including at Boğaziçi University (Robert College) (1973–1974), Columbia University (1976–1977) and Turkish Military Academy (1977–1978). He then became the director of Institute of Economic Development at Istanbul University, while also working as a consultant to the World Bank in 1980-1983.

He was elected member of Grand National Assembly of Turkey in 1983 elections, the first election held after a military rule in 1980-1983. While in the parliament, he served as consultant on economic issues and Turkey-EU relations after Turkey's submission of formal membership application to the EU.

In 1987, Mükerrem Hiç returned to Istanbul University and established a new economics program in English. He served as the department chair from 1987 to 1996. In 1996 he became professor emeritus and continues to teach Ph.D. level courses at Istanbul University.

== Publications ==
=== Books ===
- Para Teorisi ve Politikası (Monetary Theory and Policy) 10th edition, Sermet Matbaası, İstanbul, 1994.
- Büyüme ve Gelişme Ekonomisi (Growth and Development Economics); 10th edition, Sermet Matbaası, İstanbul, 1994.
- Türkiye Ekonomisinin Analizi (Analysis of the Turkish Economy), latest ed., Güryay Matbaacılık, İstanbul, 1980.
- Montaj Sanayii (Assembly Industries), Ekonomik ve Sosyal Etüdler Konferans Heyeti (Economic and Social Studies Conference Board), İstanbul, 1973.
- Otomotiv Yan Sanayii (Automotive Component Industries), Türkiye Motorlu Vasıta ve Yardımcı Sanayiciler Derneği (Turkish Automotive and Component Industries Association), İstanbul, 1973.
- Kapitalizm, Sosyalizm, Karma Ekonomi ve Türkiye (Capitalism, Socialism, Mixed Economy and Turkey), 3rd edition, Sermet Matbaası, İstanbul, 1979.
- Bozulan Ekonomi Nasıl Düzeltilir? (How an Impaired Economy be Repaired), Menteş Kitabevi, İstanbul, 1989.
- Kapalı Ekonomiden Küreselleşmeye (From Closed Economy to Globalization), Sürat Yayın, İstanbul, 2004.
- Turkey's Economy and Politics, 2010.
- Üniversite ve Politika Hayatım; Anılar ve Analizler, Derin Yayınları, İstanbul, 2012.

=== Major Articles ===
- “The Importance of Turkey’s Development Strategy for Her Integration into the EEC”, in ed.Werner Gumpel, Die Turkei auf dem Weg in die EG, R. Oldenbourg Verlag, Munchen, 1979.
- “The Question of Foreign Private Capital in Turkey”, Orient, September 1980.
- “Planned Economy vs. Market Economy: Basic Orientations of Economic Policy”, in ed.Winfried Veit, Die Turkische Krise, 89/90, Friedrich Ebert-Stiftung, Bonn, Febr, 1981.
- “Economic Policies Pursued by Turkey. Their effects on the Performance of the Economy and on her International Economic Relations”, Orient, June 1982.
- with Manoucher Parvin, “Land Reform vs. Agricultural Reform: Turkish Miracle or Catastrophe Delayed?”, International Journal of Middle East Studies, No.16, 1984.
- Weaknesses and Risks of Turkey’s Economic and Social Policies, Stiftung Wissenschaft und Politik, Ebenhausen, May, 1989.
- “Market Economy and Democracy, Turkey as a Case Study for Developing Countries and Eastern Europe”, Orient, Deutsches Orient-Institut, June 1992.
- “Cumhuriyet Döneminde Türkiye Ekonomisi”, (Turkish Economy in the Republic Period), in ed. Hasan Celal Güzel, Kemal Çiçek, Salim Koca, Türkler (Turks), Vol.17, Yeni Türkiye Yayınları, Ankara, March, 2002.
- “Atatürk ve Ekonomik Rejim. Devletçilikten Günümüzde Piyasa Ekonomisine” (Economic Regime in the Atatürk Period: from Étatisme to Market Economy Today), in ed. Güzel, Çiçek, Koca, Türkler, Vol.41, Yeni Türkiye Yayınları, Ankara, September–March, 2001.
