= Adolph Peschke =

American outdoorsman and Scouting volunteer

- Born: October 27, 1914; St Louis, Missouri, U.S.
- Died: November 23, 2012 (aged 98); Des Moines, Iowa, U.S.
- Known for: Scout Pioneering, Boy Scouts of America, Author and designer

Adolph E. Peschke was a veteran outdoorsman, author, and pioneering project designer in the Boy Scouts of America. He is best known for writing the 1993 edition of the pamphlet for the Pioneering merit badge, which serves as a guide to many Scouters implementing pioneering programs in their Scouting units.

== Background ==
Adolph E. Peschke was born in St. Louis, Missouri, October 27, 1914, to Cecil and Adolph Peschke. When he was twenty years old, he got married and lived with his wife, Grace in Webster Groves, MO where they raised their children, Don and Jayne. Adolph Peschke joined the Boy Scouts as a youth and achieved the rank of Eagle Scout. He was continuously registered as a Scout for over 85 years. For his life of service, he was presented with the Silver Antelope Award.

== Scouting ==
Adolph Peschke served as a volunteer in the Greater Saint Louis Area Council for sixty years where he dedicated much of his time to Beaumont Scout Reservation and was a director for more than twenty Wood Badge courses. Through his decades of service to the Boy Scouts of America, some of his most noteworthy contributions were:

- writing the founding charter for the National Eagle Scout Association
- serving as a resource for Scouting, Boys' Life, the BSA Fieldbook and Program Helps
- serving as the design engineer for five national Scout jamborees where he was responsible for the theme development, site layout, and staff training for the Action Center's pioneering areas

== Pioneering ==
Adolph Peschke was keenly attuned to providing the assurance that boys of Scouting age could successfully build pioneering structures themselves. He referred to these projects as "boy-sized," and has been credited with the design of thirty original "boy-size" pioneering projects. Five of these are included in the pamphlet for Pioneering merit badge along with well-presented explanations and instructions:

1. Single Lock Bridge
2. Single Trestle Bridge
3. A-Frame Bridge
4. 14' Double Ladder Signal Tower
5. Double A-Frame Monkey Bridge

With the intention of making Pioneering more within the reach of those Scout units in geographic areas where access to natural spars was limited, he devised a design for making a pioneering kit consisting of laminated spars from materials readily available at a lumberyard.

Adolph Peschke also developed the pioneering kit with its color-coded system to identify rope and spar lengths for building pioneering projects.
