= Damaskinos Roumeliotis =

Greek Orthodox Metropolitan

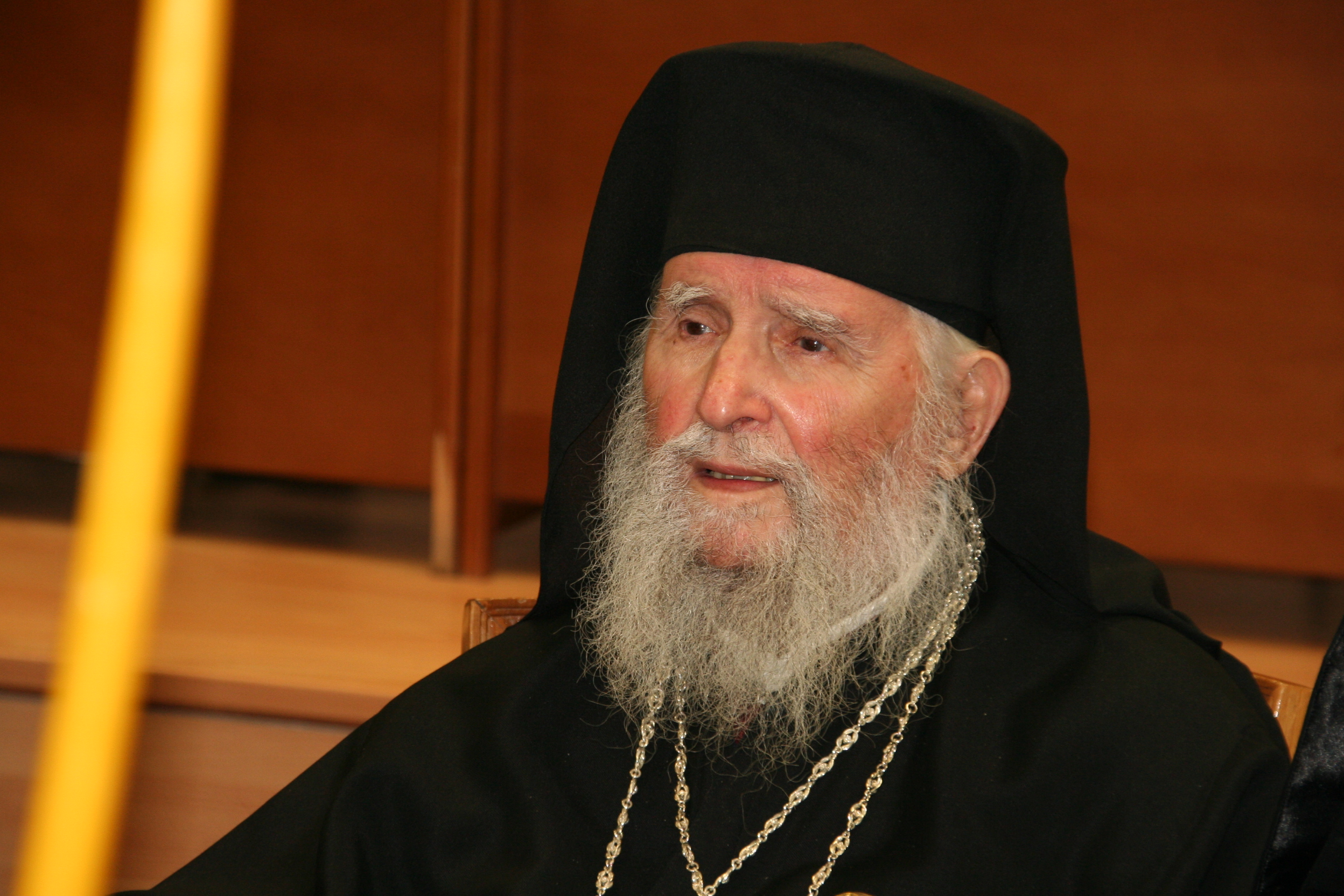
Damaskinos Roumeliotis

Damaskinos Roumeliotis (Greek: Δαμασκηνός Ρουμελιώτης; 1920 – 6 November 2012) was the Greek Orthodox Metropolitan of Maronia and Komotini, Greece.
