= Deaths in October 2012 =

The following is a list of notable deaths in October 2012.

Entries for each day are listed alphabetically by surname. A typical entry lists information in the following sequence:

- Name, age, country of citizenship and reason for notability, established cause of death, reference.

== October 2012 ==
=== 1 ===
- Gordon Audley, 84, Canadian speed skater.
- Dirk Bach, 51, German actor, comedian and television presenter, heart failure.
- Donald E. Bently, 87, American entrepreneur and engineer.
- Berkant, 73, Turkish singer, cancer.
- Walter G. Church Sr., 85, American politician, member of the North Carolina House of Representatives (1992–2008), acute myeloid leukemia.
- Madhav Dalvi, 87, Indian cricketer.
- Sahara Davenport, 27, American drag queen, reality show contestant (RuPaul's Drag Race) and singer, heart failure.
- Abdelkader Fréha, 69, Algerian footballer (MC Oran).
- Octavio Getino, 77, Spanish-born Argentine film director, cancer.
- Hassan Ghul, 35, Pakistani al-Qaeda member, drone strike.
- Eric Hobsbawm, 95, British historian.
- Russell Jones, 86, Australian Olympic (1960) ice hockey player.
- Kwan Shan, 79, Chinese-born Hong Kong film actor, lung cancer.
- Chronox Manek, Papua New Guinean lawyer and Chief Ombudsman (2008–2012).
- Ali Hussein Nassif, Lebanese militant, member of Hezbollah, killed.
- Armand Russell, 91, Canadian politician, MNA for Shefford (1956–1973) and Brome-Missisquoi (1976–1980); Minister of Public Works (1967–1970).
- Moshe Sanbar, 86, Hungarian-born Israeli economist, Governor of the Bank of Israel (1971–1976).
- Heinrich Schultz, 88, Estonian cultural functionary.
- Neville Thiele, 91, Australian audio engineer.
- Shlomo Venezia, 88, Greek-born Italian writer and Holocaust survivor.

=== 2 ===
- Afrasheem Ali, Maldivian politician, stabbed.
- John W. Gallivan, 97, American newspaper publisher, cable television pioneer, and civic leader.
- Nicholas C. Handy, 71, British chemist, pancreatic cancer.
- Konrad B. Knutsen, 87, Norwegian civil servant, State Conciliator of Norway (1975–1981).
- Marjorie Lane, 100, American singer.
- David N. Martin, 82, American advertising executive, founder of The Martin Agency, creator of the Virginia is for Lovers slogan, cancer.
- Mohammed Mushaima, 24, Bahraini political activist, sickle cell anemia.
- Kalambadi Muhammad Musliyar, 78, Indian Muslim scholar.
- Nguyễn Chí Thiện, 73, Vietnamese poet and activist, pneumonia.
- Hideji Ōtaki, 87, Japanese actor, lung cancer.
- Charles Roach, 79, Trinidadian-born Canadian civil rights lawyer, brain cancer.
- J. Philippe Rushton, 68, Canadian psychology academic and intelligence theorist, cancer.
- Erwin Steinberg, 91, American academic.
- Big Jim Sullivan, 71, British guitarist, complications of heart disease and diabetes.

=== 3 ===
- Mohammad Ali, 70, Bangladeshi physician and politician.
- Abdul Haq Ansari, 81, Indian Islamic scholar, cardiac arrest.
- Basilios Blatsos, 89, Greek-born Israeli Orthodox hierarch, Metropolitan of Caesarea (since 1975).
- Bob Brooks, 84, American film director and advertising creative. (death announced on this day)
- Francis Burt, 86, British composer and academic teacher.
- Warren Canning, 85, Australian football player.
- Robert F. Christy, 96, American theoretical physicist and astrophysicist, member of the Manhattan Project.
- Billy Hullin, 70, Welsh rugby union player.
- Jean-Louis Lagadec, 79, French footballer (Le Havre AC, SC Bastia) and coach (FC Chalon). (French)
- Kathi McDonald, 64, American singer.
- Boo Morcom, 91, American Olympic athlete.
- Alfonso Orueta, 82, Chilean politician and football manager.
- Albie Roles, 91, English footballer.
- Kidar Nath Sahani, 86, Indian politician, Governor of Sikkim (2001–2002) and Goa (2002–2004).
- Peter J. Schmitt, 62, American politician, member of the Nassau County, New York, legislature (since 1996), heart attack.
- Jörg Wischmeier, 77, German Olympic athlete.

=== 4 ===
- David Atkinson, 90, Canadian opera singer.
- Günter Böttcher, 58, German Olympic handball player, injuries sustained in traffic collision.
- Razia Butt, 88, Pakistani novelist.
- Jim Galley, 68, English cricket player (Somerset).
- K. C. N. Gowda, 84, Indian film producer and distributor.
- Bernard Holden, 104, British railway preservationist (Bluebell Railway).
- Stan Mudenge, 70, Zimbabwean politician, Minister of Foreign Affairs (1995–2005), Minister of Higher and Tertiary Education (since 2005).
- Helen Elizabeth Nash, 91, American pediatrician.
- Rudolf Oslansky, 81, Austrian footballer (Wiener Sport-Club).
- Zwelakhe Sisulu, 61, South African newspaper editor and journalist.
- Daphne Slater, 84, English actress.
- Tom Stannage, 68, Australian historian, cardiac arrest.
- Gloria Taylor, 64, Canadian right to die activist, infection from a perforated colon.
- Pramote Teerawiwatana, 45, Thai badminton player, lung cancer.
- Erhard Wunderlich, 55, German Olympic silver medal-winning (1984) handball player, cancer.

=== 5 ===
- Keith Campbell, 58, Scottish biologist, participant in the cloning of Dolly the Sheep, asphyxiation.
- Pierre Chaulet, 82, Algerian doctor, stomach cancer.
- Jack Clark, 88, Australian footballer.
- Joyce Currie, 80, New Zealand cricketer.
- Vojin Dimitrijević, 80, Serbian human rights activist.
- John Evans, 80, American artist.
- James W. Holley III, 85, American politician, Mayor of Portsmouth, Virginia (1984–1987, 1996–2010), complications of a stroke.
- Edvard Mirzoyan, 91, Georgian-born Armenian composer.
- Claude Pinoteau, 87, French film director (La Boum), cancer.

=== 6 ===
- Phil Bagwell, American computer scientist.
- Chadli Bendjedid, 83, Algerian politician, President of Algeria (1979–1992), cancer.
- Antonio Cisneros, 69, Peruvian poet, lung cancer.
- Anthony John Cooke, 80, English organist.
- Nick Curran, 35, American musician, oral cancer.
- Irene DeLaby, 90, American baseball player.
- Jeanne Delay, 92, French table tennis player.
- Rasbihari Desai, 77, Indian composer.
- Dal Dozzi, 75, Australian football player.
- Préfète Duffaut, 89, Haitian painter.
- J. Rufus Fears, 67, American historian, scholar, educator, and author.
- Ulrich Franzen, 91, German-born American architect.
- Gérard Gropaiz, 69, French Olympic (1960, 1964) swimmer.
- Raoul De Keyser, 82, Belgian painter.
- Barry Laight, 92, British aerospace engineer.
- Joseph Meyer, 71, American politician, Wyoming State Treasurer (since 2007), Secretary of State of Wyoming (1999–2007).
- R. Nagarathnamma, 86, Indian theatre artiste.
- B. Satya Narayan Reddy, 86, Indian politician, Governor of Uttar Pradesh (1990–1993) and Orissa (1993–1995), lung disease.
- J. J. C. Smart, 92, British-born Australian philosopher.
- Albert von Sachsen, 77, German noble and historian.

=== 7 ===
- Mersad Berber, 72, Bosnian painter.
- Larry Block, 69, American actor (Slap Shot, Cocktail, Don't Say a Word).
- Andrew Brimmer, 86, American economist, Federal Reserve Board of Governors (1966–1974).
- Georges Casolari, 71, French footballer (AS Monaco).
- John Cleary, 80, Canadian politician, member of the Legislative Assembly of Ontario (1987–2003).
- Roman Danylak, 81, Canadian Ukrainian Catholic hierarch, Apostolic Administrator of Toronto and Eastern Canada (1992–1998).
- Anant Dave, 74, Indian politician, cancer.
- Mervyn Dymally, 86, Trinidadian-born American politician, Lieutenant Governor of California (1975–1979), member of the House of Representatives (1981–1993).
- Clive Emmanuel, 64–65, British academic.
- Heriberto Lazcano Lazcano, 37, Mexican drug lord (Los Zetas), shooting.
- Ivo Michiels, 89, Belgian writer.
- Hank Moonjean, 82, American film producer (Dangerous Liaisons, Child's Play, The Great Gatsby), pancreatic cancer.
- Wiley Reed, 68, American-born Australian blues musician, complications from a fall.
- André Saint-Mleux, 92, Monegasque politician, Minister of State (1972–1981).

=== 8 ===
- Varsha Bhosle, 56, Indian journalist and singer, suicide by gunshot.
- Donnis Butcher, 76, American basketball player and coach (New York Knicks, Detroit Pistons).
- Walter Carsen, 100, German-born Canadian businessman and philanthropist.
- Bidit Lal Das, 74, Bangladeshi folk singer.
- Marilou Diaz-Abaya, 57, Filipina film director, breast cancer.
- Bill Drake, 81, British rugby league player.
- Leopoldo García-Colín, 81, Mexican physicist.
- James Kinsella, 88, American politician, Mayor of Hartford, Connecticut (1957–1960).
- Rafael Lesmes, 85, Spanish footballer.
- Eric Lomax, 93, Scottish author.
- José Merino del Río, 63, Costa Rican politician, kidney cancer.
- Ken Sansom, 85, American voice actor (Winnie the Pooh, Transformers, The Chipmunk Adventure), stroke.
- Hans Kristian Seip, 92, Norwegian forester.
- Nawal Kishore Sharma, 87, Indian politician, Governor of Gujarat (2004–2009).
- John Tchicai, 76, Danish jazz saxophonist and composer, brain hemorrhage.
- Eduard Volodarsky, 71, Russian scriptwriter (At Home Among Strangers, My Friend Ivan Lapshin).

=== 9 ===
- Luna Alcalay, 83, Austrian pianist, music educator and composer.
- Ken Bartholomew, 92, American Olympic silver medal-winning (1948) speed skater.
- Paddy Roy Bates, 91, British pirate radio broadcaster, founder of the Principality of Sealand, Alzheimer's disease.
- Mark Brovun, 66, Ukrainian art director.
- Federico A. Cordero, 84, Puerto Rican classical guitarist.
- Bill Gardner, 83, Australian rugby player.
- Marina Golub, 54, Russian actress, traffic collision.
- Eddie Harvey, 86, British jazz musician.
- Sammi Kane Kraft, 20, American child actress (Bad News Bears), traffic collision.
- Stefan Leletko, 59, Polish Olympic weightlifter
- Budd Lynch, 95, Canadian-born American public address announcer (Detroit Red Wings).
- George Paciullo, 78, Australian politician.
- Kenny Rollins, 89, American Olympic gold medal-winning (1948) basketball player.
- Elo Romančík, 89, Slovak actor, cardiac failure.
- Harris Savides, 55, American cinematographer (Zodiac, Milk, American Gangster), brain cancer.

=== 10 ===
- Ilse Maria Aschner, 94, Austrian journalist.
- Ram Narayan Bishnoi, 80, Indian politician.
- Mamia Chentouf, 89–90, Algerian midwife and independence activist.
- Deborah Chessler, 88–89, American songwriter.
- Kevin Curran, 53, Zimbabwean cricketer, suspected heart attack.
- Enrico di Robilant, 87–88, Italian philosopher.
- Sam Gibbons, 92, American politician, member of the U.S. House of Representatives from Florida (1963–1997).
- Andrey Gonchar, 80, Soviet and Russian mathematician.
- Derek Hutchinson, 79, British sea kayaker, author and designer
- Jos Huysmans, 70, Belgian racing cyclist, heart attack.
- Alex Karras, 77, American football player (Detroit Lions) and actor (Blazing Saddles, Webster), kidney failure.
- Piotr Lenartowicz, 78, Polish Jesuit and philosopher.
- Robert Litz, 62, American playwright, natural causes.
- Jonas Mačys, 74, Lithuanian politician.
- Carla Porta Musa, 110, Italian essayist, poet, and supercentenarian, pneumonia.
- Leo O'Brien, 41, American actor (The Last Dragon).
- Basil L. Plumley, 92, American Army command sergeant major, cancer.
- Mark Poster, 71, American philosopher.
- Peter Ross-Edwards, 90, Australian politician, leader of the Victorian Country Party (1970–1988).
- Malcolm Sampson, 72, English rugby league player.
- Mike Singleton, 61, British video game developer, cancer.
- Amanda Todd, 15, Canadian high school student and cyberbullying victim, suicide by hanging.
- Kyaw Zaw, 92, Burmese military officer and politician.

=== 11 ===
- Avraham Abutbul, 51, Israeli actor, singer and musician (Ushpizin), brain tumor.
- Balu Alaganan, 87, Indian cricketer.
- Frank Alamo, 70, French singer, amyotrophic lateral sclerosis.
- Johannes Bastiaan, 101, German violinist.
- Seamus Bonner, 63, Irish Gaelic footballer (Donegal), short illness.
- Pier Ugo Calzolari, 74, Italian academic, Rector of University of Bologna (2000–2009).
- Beano Cook, 81, American college football historian and television sports analyst (ESPN).
- Patrick Dignan, 92, Irish-born British Army surgeon.
- Bill Ezinicki, 88, Canadian ice hockey player (Toronto Maple Leafs, Boston Bruins).
- Charles E. Fritch, 85, American writer and editor.
- Avrohom Genachowsky, 76, Israeli rabbi, pancreatic cancer.
- Helmut Haller, 73, German footballer, Parkinson's disease and dementia.
- Robert Hughes, 81, American Olympic water polo player and swimmer.
- Edward Kossoy, 99, Polish lawyer, publicist and activist for victims of Nazism.
- Ernst Lindner, 77, German international footballer.
- Clarence Mitchell III, 72, American politician, Maryland Senate (1967–1986) and House member (1963–1967), cancer.
- Édgar Negret, 92, Colombian sculptor, cancer and heart failure.
- Sher Afgan Niazi, 66, Pakistani politician, liver cancer.
- Champ Summers, 66, American baseball player (Cincinnati Reds, Detroit Tigers), kidney cancer.

=== 12 ===
- Bob Aynsley, 90, New Zealand rugby league player.
- Maria Alice Barroso, 85–86, Brazilian librarian, novelist and short story writer.
- Britton Chance Jr., 72, American yacht designer, complications of a stroke.
- John Call Cook, 94, American geophysicist.
- James Elliott Coyne, 102, Canadian banker, Governor of the Bank of Canada (1955–1961).
- Raphael E. Freundlich, 84, Israeli classical scholar.
- William C. Friday, 92, American educator, President of the University of North Carolina (1956–1986).
- John Garcia, 95, American psychologist.
- Ray Gietzelt, 90, Australian trade union leader.
- Norm Grabowski, 79, American actor (The Towering Inferno) and hot rod builder.
- Jean-Pierre Hautier, 56, Belgian television presenter and broadcaster, cancer.
- Sukhdev Singh Kang, 81, Indian jurist and politician, Chief Justice of the Jammu and Kashmir High Court (1989–1993), Governor of Kerala (1997–2002).
- Ervin Kassai, 87, Hungarian Olympic and international basketball referee.
- Jim Kremmel, 63, American baseball player (Chicago Cubs).
- Torkom Manoogian, 93, Iraqi-born Armenian Apostolic hierarch, Patriarch of Jerusalem (since 1990).
- Erik Moseholm, 82, Danish jazz musician.
- Henry Moyo, 65, Malawian football coach (national team, 1984).
- Geraldine Mucha, 95, Scottish composer.
- Steve Newman, 58, American football player and coach, heart attack.
- Jorun Askersrud Nygaard, 83, Norwegian cross country skier.
- Tony Pawson, 91, English cricketer and writer (Kent).
- Břetislav Pojar, 89, Czech animator and film director.
- Varinder Singh, 57, Indian Army officer, awarded Vir Chakra.
- Vera Smith, 80, Canadian skater.
- David Trosch, 76, American Roman Catholic priest, advocate of justifiable homicide for murderers of abortion providers, after long illness.
- Harry Valérien, 88, German sports journalist.

=== 13 ===
- Marc Awodey, 51, American artist and poet.
- Sir Stuart Bell, 74, British politician, MP for Middlesbrough (since 1983), pancreatic cancer.
- Paul Brown, 43, American race car driver (Pirelli World Challenge), melanoma.
- George D. Buffett, 83, American politician.
- Georges Chaulet, 81, French writer.
- Gary Collins, 74, American actor (The Sixth Sense, The Wackiest Ship in the Army) and television host (Miss America), natural causes.
- Carl-Wilhelm Engdahl, 86, Swedish fencer.
- Tomonobu Imamichi, 89, Japanese philosopher.
- Saiichi Maruya, 87, Japanese author and literary critic, heart failure.
- Joey Pal, 85, Canadian football player (Montreal Alouettes).
- Jim Rollo, 75, Scottish footballer, cancer.
- Hisham Al-Saedni, 47, Palestinian militant, air strike.
- Frank Sando, 81, British Olympic cross-country runner.
- Harihar Swain, 73, Indian politician, MP for Aska (2004–2009), cancer.
- Szeto Kam-Yuen, 48, Hong Kong screenwriter, lung cancer.
- Manuel Torres Félix, 58, Mexican drug trafficker for the Sinaloa Cartel, shot.

=== 14 ===
- Billy Benn Perrurle, app. 69, Alyawarre landscape artist.
- Kyle Bennett, 33, American BMX cyclist, traffic collision.
- Kees W. Bolle, 84, Dutch historian.
- S. Ward Casscells, 60, American cardiologist, Assistant Secretary of Defense for Health Affairs (2007–2009), prostate cancer.
- John Clive, 79, English actor (A Clockwork Orange, The Italian Job, Yellow Submarine).
- Branko Črnac Tusta, 57, Croatian singer, throat cancer.
- Max Fatchen, 92, Australian journalist and children's writer.
- James R. Grover Jr., 93, American politician, member of the U.S. House of Representatives from New York (1963–1975), heart failure.
- Sir John Moreton, 94, British diplomat.
- Buster Pearson, 71, Jamaican musician, father and manager of Five Star.
- Joseph Rosenmiller, 87, American businessman and philanthropist.
- Eddie Russo, 86, American race car driver.
- Odorico Leovigildo Saiz Pérez, 100, Spanish-born Peruvian Roman Catholic prelate, Vicar Apostolic of Requena (1973–1987).
- Larry Sloan, 89, American publisher (Mad Libs), co-founder of Price Stern Sloan.
- Arlen Specter, 82, American politician, U.S. Senator from Pennsylvania (1981–2011), complications of non-Hodgkin lymphoma.
- Marc Swayze, 99, American comic book artist (Captain Marvel).
- Elizabeth Watkins, 89, English author, short illness.
- Dody Weston Thompson, 89, American photographer.
- Gart Westerhout, 85, Dutch-born American astronomer.

=== 15 ===
- Margaret Alington, 92, New Zealand historian.
- Michael Asher, 69, American conceptual artist.
- Abba Bina, Papua New Guinean businessman. (death announced on this date)
- Axel Borup-Jørgensen, 87, Danish composer.
- Claude Cheysson, 92, French politician, Minister of Foreign Affairs (1981–1984).
- Vladimir Čonč, 84, Croatian footballer.
- Patrick R. Cooney, 78, American Roman Catholic prelate, Bishop of Gaylord (1989–2009).
- Joseph W. Eaton, 93, German-born American sociologist.
- Robert T. Francoeur, 80, American biologist and sexologist.
- Erol Günaydın, 79, Turkish actor, heart failure.
- Trevor Kemp, app. 68, Scottish footballer (Berwick Rangers).
- María Rosa Menocal, 59, Cuban-born American academic, melanoma.
- Norodom Sihanouk, 89, Cambodian royal, King (1941–1955, 1993–2004) and nine-term Prime Minister, heart attack.
- Susan Parkinson, 87, British potter and charity worker.
- Maria Petrou, 59, Greek-born British computer scientist, cancer.
- Alberto Reif, 66, Italian footballer.
- Pat Ward, 55, American politician, Iowa State Senator (since 2004), breast cancer.
- Sam Williams, 88, American basketball coach (Texan Pan American).

=== 16 ===
- Odile Bain, 73, French parasitologist.
- Bernard Chaet, 88, American artist.
- James D. Conte, 53, American politician, member of the New York State Assembly (since 1988), cancer.
- Frank Moore Cross, 91, American biblical scholar.
- John A. Durkin, 76, American politician, Senator for New Hampshire (1975–1980).
- Mario Gallegos Jr., 62, American politician, Texas State Senator (since 1995), complications of liver disease.
- Al Ghesquiere, 93, American football player.
- Nathan Glick, 100, American artist and illustrator.
- Wava Banes Henry, 92, American teacher, founded Tau Beta Sigma.
- Aleksandr Koshkin, 53, Russian Soviet-era Olympic silver medal-winning (1980) boxer, stroke.
- Ethel Person, 77, American psychiatrist and psychoanalyst.
- Bódog Török, 88, Hungarian handball player, coach and sports official, complications of surgery.
- Eddie Yost, 86, American baseball player and coach (Washington Senators), cardiovascular disease.

=== 17 ===
- Milija Aleksic, 61, English football player (Tottenham Hotspur).
- Émile Allais, 100, French Olympic bronze medal-winning (1936) alpine ski racer.
- Milt Drewer, 89, American football coach.
- René-Marie Ehuzu, 68, Beninese Roman Catholic prelate, Bishop of Abomey (2002–2007) and Porto Novo (since 2007).
- Henry Friedlander, 82, German-born American historian of the Holocaust.
- Bandya Kakade, 67, Indian footballer, heart attack.
- Sylvia Kristel, 60, Dutch actress (Emmanuelle), model, and singer, throat and liver cancer.
- Harry E. Luther, 60, American botanist.
- Bertie Marshall, 76, Trinidadian musician and steelpan maker.
- Stanford R. Ovshinsky, 89, American inventor and scientist, prostate cancer.
- Pépito Pavon, 71, Spanish footballer (Olympique de Marseille).
- Presvis, 8, British Thoroughbred racehorse, euthanised.
- Karin Stoltenberg, 80, Norwegian geneticist and politician.
- Kōji Wakamatsu, 76, Japanese film director, traffic collision.

=== 18 ===
- Florence Akins, 106, New Zealand artist.
- Christopher Allen, 68, English cricket player (Dorset), bowel cancer.
- Borah Bergman, 85, American free jazz pianist, dementia.
- Brain Damage, 34, American professional wrestler, suicide.
- E. K. Fretwell, 88, American teacher and university administrator.
- Zdzisław Kotla, 63, Polish Olympic sailor.
- Mihály Lukács, 57, Hungarian Romani politician, member of the National Assembly (2002–2006), after long illness.
- Bob Martin, 87, American Olympic rower.
- Slater Martin, 86, American Hall of Fame basketball player (Minneapolis Lakers, St. Louis Hawks).
- George Mattos, 83, American Olympic (1952, 1956) pole vaulter, prostate cancer.
- Jack McGaw, 76, Canadian broadcaster.
- John Rigby, 89, Australian artist.
- Dilbagh Singh Kler, 76, Malaysian Olympic athlete.
- Otto Richard Skopil Jr., 93, American federal judge (9th Circuit Court of Appeals).
- Albert Lee Ueltschi, 95, American aviation trainer, founder of FlightSafety International.
- David S. Ware, 62, American jazz saxophonist, complications of a kidney transplant.

=== 19 ===
- Wissam al-Hassan, 47, Lebanese police officer, head of the Information Branch of the Internal Security Forces, car bomb.
- Wiyogo Atmodarminto, 89, Indonesian general, Governor of Jakarta (1987–1992).
- Lincoln Alexander, 90, Canadian politician, MP for Hamilton West (1968–1980), Minister of Labour (1979–1980), and Lieutenant Governor of Ontario (1985–1991).
- Copiad, 23, Swedish breeding stallion and racing trotter.
- Joe Cullinane, 89, American baseball broadcaster and author.
- Raymond Dumais, 62, Canadian Roman Catholic ex-prelate, Bishop of Gaspé (1993–2001).
- Mike Graham, 61, American professional wrestler, suicide by gunshot.
- Walter Harrison, 91, British politician, MP for Wakefield (1964–1987), Government Deputy Chief Whip (1974–1979).
- Jack Hirst, 75, British rugby league player.
- Dessie Kane, 60, Irish cricketer.
- Johann Kniewasser, 61, Austrian alpine skier, liver disease.
- Thomas Madigage, 41, South African footballer and coach, traffic collision.
- Fiorenzo Magni, 91, Italian racing cyclist, Giro d'Italia winner (1948, 1951, 1955), aneurysm.
- Manuel António Pina, 68, Portuguese journalist and writer.
- John Radford, 65, British writer, heart failure.
- Barbara Sowers, 80, American baseball player.
- Raúl Valencia, 36, Spanish footballer.

=== 20 ===
- Oli Ahad, 84–85, Bangladeshi politician and language activist, lung infection.
- Jaouad Akaddar, 28, Moroccan footballer, cardiac arrest.
- George Dessart, 87, American television producer and executive.
- Milena Doleželová-Velingerová, 80, Czech sinologist.
- Przemysław Gintrowski, 60, Polish composer and musician.
- William Goad, 68, British businessman and convicted child sex offender, natural causes.
- Paul Kurtz, 86, American skeptic and secular humanist.
- Daniel Enele Kwanairara, 65, Solomon Islands politician, MP for North Malaita (1997–2001, 2004–2010), Minister for Agriculture and Livestock (2005–2006).
- Dave May, 68, American baseball player (Atlanta Braves, Milwaukee Brewers, Baltimore Orioles), complications from cancer and diabetes.
- Sándor Mazány, 89, Hungarian Olympic skier.
- John McConnell, 97, American peace activist, designed the Earth Day flag.
- Joe Melia, 77, British actor.
- Mataiasi Ragigia, Fijian politician, MP for Suva City Urban (since 2001) and minister.
- Daphne Skillern, 84, British police officer.
- Kirdy Stevens, 92, American pornographic film director.
- E. Donnall Thomas, 92, American physician, Nobel laureate in Physiology or Medicine (1990), heart disease.
- Raymond Watson, 86, American business executive (Walt Disney Productions), complications of Parkinson's disease.

=== 21 ===
- Raja Ali, 36, Indian cricketer, cardiac arrest.
- Harvie Andre, 72, Canadian politician, MP for Calgary Centre (1972–1993) and cabinet minister, cancer.
- Jan Barnard, 83, South African Olympic (1956) marathon runner.
- Elizabeth Bell, 71, English actress, oesophageal cancer.
- Chacha Pakistani, 90, Pakistani nationalist.
- Geoff Beynon, 86, British trade union leader.
- Yash Chopra, 80, Indian director, filmmaker, script writer, and producer (Kabhi Kabhie, Deewaar, Veer-Zaara), dengue fever and multiple organ failure.
- J. Duncan M. Derrett, 90, British academic.
- Antoni Dobrowolski, 108, Polish Holocaust survivor, oldest known Auschwitz survivor.
- Hans Fichtner, 95, German rocket scientist.
- Tim Johnson, 52, American country music songwriter, cancer.
- Ted Kazanoff, 90, American actor (Law & Order).
- Alf Kumalo, 82, South African photographer, suspected kidney failure.
- Jaroslav Kozlík, 105, Czech pedagogue and volleyball player, natural causes.
- George McGovern, 90, American politician and USAAF pilot, U.S. Representative (1957–1961) and Senator (1963–1981), 1972 Democratic Party presidential nominee.
- Steve Paul, 71, American nightclub owner (The Scene) and artist manager (Johnny Winter).
- Irene Treppler, 86, American politician, member of the Missouri House of Representatives (1973–1985) and Missouri Senate (1985–1997), dementia.
- William Walker, 99, British fighter pilot (Battle of Britain), stroke.
- Run Wrake, 46, British animator and film director, cancer.

=== 22 ===
- Nayden Apostolov, 64, Bulgarian geographer, theorist, writer and professor.
- Bidushi Dash Barde, 23, Indian actress and model, bleeding from lacerations. (body discovered on this date)
- Betty Binns Fletcher, 89, American federal judge (9th Circuit Court of Appeals).
- Amrita Chaudhry, 40, Indian journalist, road accident.
- Carolyn Conwell, 82, American actress (Torn Curtain, The Young and the Restless).
- Desejado Lima da Costa, Bissau-Guinean politician.
- Leroy Coury, Kittitian cricketer.
- Claire Dan, 92, Australian philanthropist, Founder and Life President of the Sydney International Piano Competition.
- Don W. East, 67, American politician.
- Ahmad Ghabel, 58, Iranian religious scholar and political dissident, brain tumor.
- Arthur Jensen, 89, American psychologist, educator and author, Parkinson's disease.
- Jack Lumsden, 85, British Olympic modern pentathlete.
- Russell Means, 72, American Ogala Lakota activist and actor (Pocahontas, The Last of the Mohicans, Pathfinder), esophageal cancer.
- Chuckie Merlino, 73, American mobster (Philadelphia crime family).
- Mike Morris, 66, British television presenter (TV-am), heart failure.
- Shubha Phutela, 21, Indian film actress and model, multiple organ failure.
- Gabrielle Roth, 71, American dancer and musician, lung cancer.
- Donald Takayama, 68, American surfer, member of the International Surfing Hall of Fame (1991), complications from heart surgery.
- Sir Wilson Whineray, 77, New Zealand rugby union player and businessman (Carter Holt Harvey).

=== 23 ===
- Barouh Berkovits, 86, Czech-born American bioengineer.
- William Joel Blass, 95, American judge and politician, member of the Mississippi House of Representatives (1953–1960).
- Wilhelm Brasse, 94, Polish photographer, prisoner in Auschwitz during World War II.
- Roland de la Poype, 92, French fighter pilot.
- Philippe Di Santo, 62, Belgian footballer (R. Charleroi S.C., Sint-Truiden, Delfino Pescara 1936) and coach (K.A.S. Eupen), following a long illness.
- Sunil Gangopadhyay, 78, Indian writer and poet, cardiac arrest.
- Hughie Hay, 80, Scottish footballer.
- Corrado Lojacono, 88, Italian singer ("Carina") and actor (Howlers in the Dock), kidney failure.
- Jozef Mannaerts, 89, Belgian footballer (K.R.C. Mechelen).
- Michael Marra, 60, Scottish musician and songwriter, throat cancer.

=== 24 ===
- Peggy Ahern, 95, American child actress (Our Gang).
- Hannie Bal, 91, Dutch painter.
- Janet Berliner, 73, South African-born American science fiction author.
- Anita Björk, 89, Swedish actress.
- Jeff Blatnick, 55, American Olympic gold medal-winning (1984) wrestler and sports commentator, complications following heart surgery.
- Phil Bygrave, 83, New Zealand field hockey player.
- Juanita Casey, 87, Irish novelist and poet.
- Bill Dees, 73, American musician and songwriter ("Oh, Pretty Woman", "It's Over"), brain tumor.
- Rostyslav Dotsenko, 81, Ukrainian translator, literary critic, and author.
- Margaret Osborne duPont, 94, American tennis player, winner of 37 Grand Slam titles.
- Eusebius Politylo, 84, Ukrainian Orthodox hierarch, Metropolitan of Rivne and Ostroh (2005–2012).
- Alfred Schakron, 51, Lebanese-born Belizean businessman, shot.
- Peter Wright, 78, English footballer (Colchester United F.C.).

=== 25 ===
- Michael Daniel Ambatchew, 45, Ethiopian children's book writer.
- Rafiqul Anwar, 59, Bangladeshi politician, liver ailment.
- Aude, 65, Canadian writer, leukemia.
- Jacques Barzun, 104, French-born American historian.
- Dimitris Beis, 84, Greek politician, Mayor of Athens (1979–1986), cancer.
- Jaspal Bhatti, 57, Indian actor (Flop Show) and comedian, traffic collision.
- Max Brown, Australian politician.
- Cesare Canevari, 85, Italian actor, director and screenwriter (Matalo!, A Man for Emmanuelle).
- John Cannon, 86, English historian.
- Hadley Castille, 79, American Cajun fiddler.
- John Connelly, 74, English footballer (Burnley F.C.), cancer.
- Piermassimiliano Dotto, 42, Italian rugby union player, heart attack.
- Roger Gibbs, 80, New Zealand swimmer.
- Jacques Goimard, 78, French writer, Parkinson's disease.
- Aung Gyi, 93, Burmese politician, cardiac arrest.
- Balázs Győrffy, 74, Hungarian-born American physicist.
- Olga Jančić, 83, Serbian sculptor.
- Alexander Lapin, 67, Russian photographer.
- James Gibson Lorimer, 89, Canadian politician, member of the Legislative Assembly of British Columbia for Burnaby-Willingdon (1960–1975; 1979–1983).
- Erich Masurat, 85, German Olympic sports shooter.
- Les Mueller, 93, American baseball player (Detroit Tigers).
- Emanuel Steward, 68, American Hall of Fame boxing trainer and HBO boxing commentator, complications of diverticulitis.
- Joop Stokkermans, 75, Dutch composer.
- Ronald John Yates, app. 88, Australian businessman, CEO of Qantas.

=== 26 ===
- Mac Ahlberg, 81, Swedish cinematographer (Beverly Hills Cop III, The Brady Bunch Movie, Oscar), heart failure.
- Carlos Azevedo, 63, Portuguese composer and pianist.
- Richard N. Current, 100, American historian and biographer.
- Luigi Dadda, 89, Italian computer scientist (Dadda multiplier).
- Arnold Greenberg, 80, American businessman, co-founder of Snapple, cancer.
- Eloy Gutiérrez Menoyo, 77, Spanish-born Cuban dissident (Alpha 66), heart attack.
- Joža Horvat, 97, Croatian writer.
- John M. Johansen, 96, American architect, last surviving member of the Harvard Five, heart failure.
- Alan Kirschenbaum, 51, American television writer and producer (Coach, My Name Is Earl, Raising Hope), suicide.
- Naoki Miyamoto, 77, Japanese professional Go player, hepatocellular carcinoma.
- Natina Reed, 31, American musician (Blaque) and actress (Bring It On), traffic collision.
- Björn Sieber, 23, Austrian alpine skier, traffic collision.
- Alan Stretton, 90, Australian major general, disaster recovery leader (Cyclone Tracy) and AFL player (St. Kilda), haemorrhage.
- Georges Van Straelen, 55, French footballer (FC Nantes, Girondins de Bordeaux, Toulouse FC, RC Strasbourg) and coach, lung cancer.
- Frank Weddig, 67, American politician, Colorado Senate (1994–2000) and House of Representatives (2000–2004).

=== 27 ===
- Shirley Ballard, 87, American actress, director and screenwriter.
- Anatoly Betekhtin, 81, Russian military commander.
- Ian Buist, 82, British diplomat.
- Terry Callier, 67, American singer-songwriter, cancer.
- Robert W. Castle, 83, American Episcopal priest and actor (Philadelphia).
- Angelo Maria Cicolani, 60, Italian politician, Senator for Rieti (since 2001).
- Joe Cinderella, 85, American guitarist and educator.
- Dick de Fegely, 84, Australian politician, member of the Victorian Legislative Council (1985–1999).
- Regina Dourado, 59, Brazilian actress, breast cancer.
- Jacques Dupin, 85, French poet and critic.
- Dmitry Gayev, 61, Russian civil servant, head of Moscow Metro, cancer.
- Illar Hallaste, 53, Estonian cleric, politician, lawyer, and businessman.
- Hans Werner Henze, 86, German composer (Symphony No. 9, Elegy for Young Lovers, The Raft of the Medusa).
- Eduardo Herrera Riera, 85, Venezuelan Roman Catholic prelate, Bishop of Carora (1994–2003), cancer.
- John LoVetere, 76, American football player (Los Angeles Rams, New York Giants).
- Felix Eugenio Mkhori, 81, Malawian Roman Catholic prelate, Bishop of Chikwawa (1979–2001) and Lilongwe (2001–2007).
- Terry Owens, 68, American football player (San Diego Chargers), Chronic traumatic encephalopathy (CTE).
- Rodney S. Quinn, 89, American politician, member of the Maine House of Representatives (1974–1978), Secretary of State of Maine (1979–1988), pneumonia.
- Alan Shaxon, 78, British magician.
- Göran Stangertz, 68, Swedish actor and director, throat cancer.
- Ray Torres, 54, Mexican baseball player.
- Bill White, 51, American animator.

=== 28 ===
- Vitaliy Alisevich, 45, Belarusian hammer thrower, heart problem.
- Robert Amft, 95, American painter, sculptor, photographer, and designer.
- Merry Anders, 78, American actress (Maverick, Bonanza).
- François Arnal, 88, French painter and sculptor.
- Bertil Bäckvall, 89, Swedish footballer and football manager.
- Gordon Bilney, 73, Australian politician, member of the House of Representatives for Kingston (1983–1996).
- Bob Brunner, 78, American television writer and producer (Diff'rent Strokes, Happy Days, The Odd Couple), heart attack.
- John Cheffers, 76, Australian sports administrator and footballer.
- Nicki R. Crick, 54, American psychologist.
- Jack Dellal, 89, British property investor, natural causes.
- Heinrich Karlen, 90, Swiss-born Zimbabwean Roman Catholic prelate, Archbishop of Bulawayo (1974–1997).
- Susan Murphy-Milano, 52, American author, cancer.
- George Riashi, 78, Lebanese Melkite Catholic hierarch, Archbishop of Tripoli (1995–2010).
- Mel Spence, 76, Jamaican Olympic sprinter.
- Tie the Knot, 18, Australian Thoroughbred racehorse, winner of the Sydney Cup (1998, 1999) and Chipping Norton Stakes (1999, 2000, 2001, 2002). (death announced on this date)
- Gaetano Tumiati, 94, Italian novelist and journalist, won 1976 Premio Campiello.

=== 29 ===
- Brenda Agard, 51, British photographer, poet and storyteller.
- Warsame Shire Awale, 61, Somali poet and writer, shooting.
- Letitia Baldrige, 86, American etiquette expert, White House Social Secretary, osteoarthritis with cardiac complications.
- J. Bernlef, 75, Dutch writer.
- George Bossy, 85, Canadian Olympic sprint canoer and football player.
- Valerie Todd Davies, 92, Australian zoologist.
- Thomas Delworth, 83, Canadian diplomat and academic.
- Cordelia Edvardson, 83, Swedish journalist and Holocaust survivor.
- John Hind Farmer, 95, British soldier.
- Albano Harguindeguy, 85, Argentine general.
- Susumu Ishikawa, 79, Japanese voice actor and singer, stomach cancer and emphysema.
- Kenneth G. Ryder, 88, American academic, President of Northeastern University (1975–1989).
- Wallace L. W. Sargent, 77, British-born American astronomer, prostate cancer.
- Jack H. Vaughn, 92, American public servant and diplomat, Director of the Peace Corps (1966–1969), cancer.

=== 30 ===
- Arjen Arî, 55–56, Kurdish poet and writer.
- Franck Biancheri, 51, French politician, cancer.
- Jan Crutchfield, 74, American singer and songwriter.
- Minardi, 14, American-bred, Irish-trained Thoroughbred racehorse and sire.
- Samina Raja, 51, Pakistani poet, writer, educationist, and broadcaster, cancer.
- Leonard Termo, 77, American actor (Fight Club, Johnny Dangerously).
- Dan Tieman, 71, American basketball player (Cincinnati Royals), cancer.
- Wayland Tunley, 75, British architect.
- Trevor West, 74, Irish academic and politician, Senator for Dublin University (1970–1981, 1982–1983).
- Lebbeus Woods, 72, American architect and artist.

=== 31 ===
- Gae Aulenti, 84, Italian architect and designer.
- Hugh Bell, 85, American photographer.
- Frederick C. Blesse, 91, American general.
- June Blundell, Lady Blundell, 90, New Zealand charity patron, widow of former governor-general Sir Denis Blundell.
- Nona Byrne, 90, British Building Society founder and philanthropist.
- Brian Cobby, 83, British actor, voice of the speaking clock (1985–2007).
- George G. Crawford, 92, American judge and politician.
- Alfons Demming, 84, German Roman Catholic prelate, Auxiliary Bishop of Münster (1976–1998).
- Jack Finck, 82, Australian football player (Collingwood).
- John Fitch, 95, American racing driver, Merkel cell carcinoma.
- Alexander Kibrik, 73, Russian linguist (Moscow State University).
- Fernando Ortiz Monasterio, 89, Mexican plastic surgeon and Olympic sailor.
- Christina Persighetti, 76, British Olympic athlete.
- John H. Reed, 91, American politician, Governor of Maine (1959–1966), pneumonia.
- Faustino Sainz Muñoz, 75, Spanish Roman Catholic prelate, Apostolic Nuncio to Great Britain (2004–2010), cancer.
- Teri Shields, 79, American model and actress, complications from dementia.
- Bernard John Smith, 61, British geologist.
- Fergie Sutherland, 81, British–born Irish horse trainer.
- Bill Tom, 89, American Olympic gymnast.
- Konstantin Vyrupayev, 82, Russian Olympic medal-winning (1956, 1960) wrestler.
