= Work Labs =

Advertising agency

- Industry: Advertising
- Founded: 1994; 31 years ago in Los Angeles, California
- Founder: Cabell Harris (president and CEO)
- Headquarters: Richmond, Virginia, United States

Work Labs (stylised as WORK Labs) is an advertising agency located in Richmond, Virginia.

== History ==
Work Labs was founded by Cabell Harris in 1994 in Los Angeles, California as an advertising agency for other agencies. In 1995, Work Labs relocated to Richmond, Virginia. The company's president and CEO is Cabell Harris.

Work Labs handles creative projects as a subcontractor to a wide range of advertising agencies such as TBWA\Chiat\Day, The Martin Agency, Fallon McElligott, BBDO and Merkley Newman Harty. Through these agency relationships, Work has done projects for name-brand clients such as The Hershey Company, Miller Lite, Exxon, BP and Sears. In 1999, Work was selected to join Ogilvy & Mather's “Syndicate,” a network of seven creatively-focused partnerships across the USA.

In 2004, Cabell Harris launched Work Brands, taking Work-branded products to market. Work branded products include Work beer, books, tools, apparel, and office supplies. Within seven months of distribution, Work Beer was named Main Street Beer Company's top-selling beer.

In 2010, Work Labs launched Labs Rats, an open-source collaborative for professionals across various disciplines to solve business challenges and contribute to creative projects.

In 2011, Work was voted in the top 50 package designs of the year by The Dieline.

== Notable Campaigns ==
- Nynex
- Exxon
- YDoUThink
- Radio Heard Here

== Recognition ==
- 2009 One Show Design Merit Award
- Communication Arts 2007 Design Annual Winner
- Communication Arts 2008 Design Annual Winner
- New York Addys
- Effies
- 2002 Bronze Cannes Lion Award
