= Thomas Harding (disambiguation) =

Thomas Harding (died 1532) was an English religious dissident

Thomas Harding may also refer to:

- Thomas Harding (1516–1572), English Catholic priest and controversialist
- Thomas Harding (sailor) (1837–?), American Civil War Medal of Honor recipient, awarded in 1864
- Thomas Harding (writer) (born 1968), British journalist, videographer and publisher
- Thomas Harding (baseball writer), MLB.com Colorado Rockies beat writer
- Thomas Walter Harding (1843–1927), English industrialist and civic figure
- Tom Harding, train engineer involved in the Lac-Mégantic derailment
- Thomas Oliver Harding (1850–1896), Senior Wrangler at Cambridge University
