= Ovesey =

Ovesey is a surname and may refer to:

- Lionel Ovesey (1915–1995), American psychoanalyst
- Regina Ovesey (1921–2003), American advertising executive
