= When in Rome (Cliff Richard album) =

Studio album by Cliff Richard
- Released: August 1965
- Genre: Pop
- Label: Columbia
- Producer: Norrie Paramor

Cliff Richard chronology
Cliff Richard (1965)	When in Rome (1965)	Love is Forever (1965)

Professional ratings
Review scores
Source	Rating
Record Mirror	5/5 stars

When in Rome is a foreign language studio album by Cliff Richard released in 1965. It is Richard's eighth studio album and fifteenth album overall. The album of mainly Italian songs was recorded in Lisbon and features one track in Portuguese, "Maria Ninguém". The album was originally intended for Richard's Italian audience but was also released domestically in the UK after Richard's earlier When in Spain album made the top ten of the UK Album Charts. This album, however, was not as well received and was Richard's first album to miss the charts.

== Track listing ==
Side one
No.	Title	Writer(s)	Length
1.	"Come Prima" ("For the First Time")	Mario Panzeri / Vincenzo di Paola / Sando Taccani	2:23
2.	"Nel Blu Dipinto Di Blu (Volare)"	Domenico Modugno, Franco Migliacci	2:23
3.	"Concerto d'Autumno" ("Autumn Concerto")	Danpa / Camillo Bargoni	2:49
4.	"O Mio Signore" ("The Questions")	Edoardo Vianello / Mogol	3:38
5.	"Maria Ninguém" ("Maria's Her Name")	Mogol / Carlos Lyra	2:05
6.	"Non l'Ascoltar" ("Don't Talk to Him")	Cliff Richard / Bruce Welch / Cassia	2:50
7.	"Dicitencello Vuie" ("Just Say I Love Her")	Kalmanoff / Ward / Fusco / Val / Dale / Rodolfo Falvo	2:55

Side two
No.	Title	Writer(s)	Length
1.	"Arrivederci Roma"	Pietro Garinei / Sandro Giovannini / Renato Rascel	3:01
2.	"Carina"	Alberto Testa / Poes	2:40
3.	"Legata ad un granello di sabbia" ("A Little Grain of Sand")	Gianni Marchetti / Nico Fidenco	3:10
4.	"Casa Senza Finestre" ("House Without Windows")	Alberto Testa / Lee Pockriss	2:41
5.	"Che Cosa Farai Di Questo Mio Amore"	Pallavicini / De Ponti	2:30
6.	"Per un Bacio d'Amor" ("Tell Me You're Mine")	Bertini / Ravasini	2:45
