= Patrick Dignan =

Patrick Dignan may refer to:

- Patrick Dignan (politician) (1814–1894), New Zealand member of parliament
- Patrick Dignan (British Army officer) (1920–2012), British director of army surgery
