= Tobias Kulang =

Papua New Guinean politician

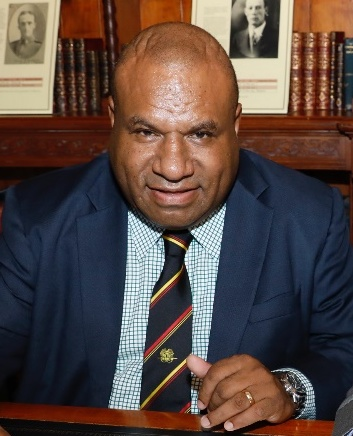
Kulang in 2017

Tobias Thomas Kulang (born 21 June 1970) is a Papua New Guinean politician. He has been a member of the National Parliament of Papua New Guinea since August 2011, representing the electorate of Kundiawa-Gembogl Open in Chimbu Province for the PNG Constitutional Democratic Party (2011–2013), People's Progress Party (2013–2015) and People's National Congress (2015–2017). He was a prominent and outspoken member of the opposition before defecting to the government in November 2013; he served as Minister for Tourism, Arts and Culture in the government of Peter O'Neill.

== Early life and first term ==
Kulang was educated at Gembogl Primary School, Mt. Wilhelm Secondary School and the Divine Word Institute, where he graduated with a Bachelor in Accounting. He was an accountant before entering politics, working as principal of Star Business Consultants.

He was first elected to the National Parliament at an August 2011 by-election following the death of MP Joe Mek Teine. He had been elected for the newly founded PNG Constitutional Democratic Party, founded by former Chief Ombudsman Ila Geno, an in-law relation of Kulang. In November 2011, he threatened a Supreme Court challenge to the constitutionality of Joint District Planning and Budget Priorities Committees, because he argued that they violated the separation of powers in rendering legislators also responsible for implementing projects. In December 2011, he criticised what he considered "political interference" in hiring processes which had resulted in the temporary closure of Kundiawa Hospital, and called for the reinstatement of "proper procedures".

In January 2012, Kulang jointly funded a water supply project which reinstated a source of fresh water for Kundiawa township after three months without water due to landowner disputes. He personally allocated K100,000 to maintenance of the dilapidated Kundiawa-Gembogl road, while securing K25.5m towards the road from the national government. He unsuccessfully called for the deferral of the 2012 election, citing problems with the common roll and claiming that the country was not prepared. However, he was re-elected for a full term in July 2012.

== Re-election and second term ==
Following the 2012 election, Kulang publicly criticised Prime Minister Peter O'Neill regarding a range of alleged corruption issues in relation to the management of the National Provident Fund, public servant housing and controversial payments to law firms. He stated there was "nothing of substance about the Prime Minister's vision" and felt that he could better fight corruption by being in the opposition and providing public scrutiny of the government. He was subsequently appointed Opposition Whip and Shadow Minister for Public Enterprises and Public Service.

In August 2012, he stated that he believed the government's free education policy was "doomed to failure" as it could not be properly managed and was being implemented without addressing underlying structural issues. He criticised government spending on overseas trips, raised concerns about Papua New Guinea's stake in the PNG Gas project possibly being reduced due to increased demands from ExxonMobil, and strongly opposed an extension of the "grace period" that protects governments from no-confidence motions.

In response to calls to ban non-Christian religions in Papua New Guinea, Kulang stated "where we need to take into account the fundamental issue of integrity and moral uprightness, we need to institutionalise our Christian religion". In January 2013, he criticised the government over the failed Eight Mile public service housing scheme outside Port Moresby and demanded answers as to where money had gone. He raised a number of concerns about perceived overspending on infrastructure projects in the National Capital District as opposed to the rest of the country. In May 2013, he called for much-increased penalties for corporate fraud, while announcing his opposition to the death penalty in PNG. In June 2013, he criticised the government for failing to replace deceased Chief Ombudsman Chronox Manek while also leaving other positions in the corruption watchdog unfilled.

Kulang strongly condemned proposed constitutional changes in 2013 that would require a three-month notice period and the signatures of a third of MPs for no-confidence motions and reduce the number of sitting days. He described the government's "continuous tampering with the constitution to entrench itself deeper in power" as "a very dangerous move indeed" that would make no-confidence motions virtually impossible. He stated that the government was "moving very quickly to remove key features of the Constitution that make democracy work in this country" and "has systematically weakened the opposition to such an extent that there is no opposition" He raised the possibility of a legal challenge, and suggested that the introduction of a second chamber and/or a presidential form of government might prevent the executive branch of government from overpowering the legislative branch. The amendments passed on an 82-2 vote in parliament in September 2013, with Kulang and Sam Basil the only two MPs to vote against. In October, Kulang and Geno jointly filed a Supreme Court challenge in relation to the amendments.

In July 2013, Kulang strongly criticised the Papua New Guinea-Australia deal on processing and potentially resettling Australian refugees in Papua New Guinea. He claimed that Papua New Guinea had no capacity to deal with the asylum seekers and suggested that it may make Papua New Guinea as guilty as Australia in breaching the Refugee Convention. Kulang asks whether Australia is "running away from its international obligations whilst for PNG, it's become a dumping ground for Australia's inadequacies" and that "Australia, who with its monetary wealth, is able to pass the buck on to poorer countries." He further stated "no amount of development assistance package that will be offered by Australia through this deal can measure up to the socio-economic dislocation" caused by the deal. He later described it as "illegal and unconstitutional" and was involved in the opposition's filing of a Supreme Court reference on the matter.

== Defection to government, second party switch and promotion to the ministry ==
Although he had been a prominent and outspoken member of the opposition, in November 2013, Kulang resigned from the PNG Constitutional Democratic Party and crossed the floor to join the government, joining junior coalition partner the People's Progress Party. In December 2013, at Nadzab Airport, he assaulted a manager of the contractor for the Kundiawa to Gewa Road, over delays to the project. He subsequently obtained and paid for an audit of the project, and recommended a full investigation. He was not charged by the police for the incident.

In February 2015, he commended Prime Minister O'Neill for his free education policy, but raised concerns about the Grade 8 and Grade 10 examinations causing a large number of "drop-outs" in Chimbu Province. In April 2015, the Papua New Guinea Trade Union Congress referred Kulang and four other MPs to the Ombudsman Commission over a K693,041 trip to the United States to purchase a 404-year-old Bible.

Kulang switched parties for a second time in May 2015, joining the governing People's National Congress. In April 2016, he was appointed Minister for Tourism, Arts and Culture in the O'Neill government. In May 2016, he reinstated the availability of visas on arrival for Australian tourists, retracting an earlier withdrawal. He also announced the establishment of a Tourism Promotion Authority office in Madang and appointed a new permanent CEO for the body. He is campaigning for re-election at the 2017 election as a People's National Congress candidate. He lost his seat to William Gogl Onglo.

== Arrests ==
Kulang was arrested by police on July 31, 2017 for a fight that resulted in two men being killed, and two vehicles and a high-covenant house being burnt. In 2018, Kulang was arrested and charged with abuse of office.

National Parliament of Papua New Guinea
Preceded by Joe Mek Teine	Member for Kundiawa-Gembogl Open; 2011–present	Incumbent
