= Sowers =

Sowers may refer to:

== Places ==
- Sowers, Texas; ghost town in Dallas County near Dallas, Texas
- Sowers, Virginia; unincorporated community in Floyd County, Virginia
- Sowers Glacier, glacier in Ellsworth Land, Antarctica

== People ==
- Barbara Sowers (1932–2012), All-American Girls Professional Baseball League player
- George F. Sowers (1921–1996), American professor
- Jeremy Sowers (born 1983), American professional baseball player
- Katie Sowers (born 1986), American football offensive assistant
- Scott Sowers (born 1963), American actor
- Tommy Sowers (born 1976), American entrepreneur, academic and politician

== Films ==
- Sowers and Reapers, a lost 1917 silent film feature directed by George D. Baker
- The Sowers, a surviving 1916 silent film drama produced by Jesse Lasky

== See also ==
- Sowing
- Sow (disambiguation)
- Sour (disambiguation)
