= List of Colorado Rockies broadcasters =

The Colorado Rockies are broadcast locally in Colorado on the radio and produced by MLB Network and televised on ROCKIES.TV, a streaming service with no blackouts. ROCKIES.TV is also carried by DirecTV, Charter, Comcast, FuboTV, and several other smaller Cable television providers.

== Radio ==
The flagship radio station of the Rockies Radio Network is KOA 850 AM. Games are carried on the network in eight states.

Jeff Kingery, who was with the team in the radio booth since its inaugural season in 1993, retired at the end of the 2009 season after 17 years broadcasting Rockies games. Kingery is famous for his home run call, "that ball's going and it ain't coming back!"

Kingery's long-time partner in the booth, Jack Corrigan, assumed primary play-by-play duties after Kingery's retirement. Corrigan's signature home run call is, "It's touch 'em all time!"

Beginning with the 2010 season, Jerry Schemmel partnered with Corrigan, in the color commentator role (and calling middle innings while Corrigan did color). Prior to the 2020 season, Schemmel was dismissed and replaced with Mike Rice. In April 2022 Mike Rice refused to get the COVID-19 vaccine and Jerry Schemmel returned to the Rockies radio booth.Schemmel was laid off again at the conclusion of the 2025 season. Zach Goodman, son of longtime Rockies television play-by-play announcer Drew Goodman, joined the Rockies radio booth early in the 2026 season.

One of the two radio broadcasters will occasionally substitute for one of the television broadcasters if necessary.

=== List of radio announcers ===
- Joe Cullinane: 1993–94, pre- and postgame host
- Jack Corrigan: 2003–present
- Wayne Hagin: 1993–2002
- Jeff Kingery: 1993–2009
- Mike Rice: 2020–2022
- Jerry Schemmel: 2010–19 & 2022–2025
- Zach Goodman: 2026-present

== Television ==
Drew Goodman, Ryan Spilborghs and Jeff Huson call the Rockies games on television. Goodman's home run call is, "take a good look, you won't see it for long!"

As of 2023, Rockies pregame and postgame shows are handled by Jenny Cavnar, Kelsey Wingert, Marc Stout, Cory Sullivan and Ryan Lavarnway. Wingert, Cavnar and Stout also offer on-camera in-game commentary from the stands. Ryan Spilborghs sometimes calls games in the broadcast booth in the absence of Huson. Both Huson and Spilborghs will also occasionally appear on pregame and postgame shows.

The Rockies cable television affiliate was AT&T SportsNet Rocky Mountain from 1997 to 2023, when the network shut down. In previous years, over-the-air broadcasts were carried on KWGN-TV from 1993–2002, and on KTVD (Channel 20; UPN affiliate until 9/5/06, after which it joined MyNetworkTV) from 2003–2008.

=== List of television announcers ===
==== Play-by-play ====
- Charlie Jones: 1993–1995
- Gayle Gardner: August 3, 1993 (filling in for Charles Jones on KWGN-TV 2 telecast of Rockies at Cincinnati Reds)
- Dave Armstrong: 1996–2001
- Drew Goodman: 2002–Present
- Jack Corrigan: 2003–present (filling in for Drew Goodman)
- Jerry Schemmel: 2010–19 & 2022–Present (filling in for Drew Goodman)
- Marc Stout: 2017–Present (filling in for Drew Goodman)
- Jenny Cavnar: 2018–2023 (filling in for Drew Goodman)

==== Color commentators ====
- Duane Kuiper: 1993
- Dave Campbell: 1994–1997
- George Frazier: 1998–2015
- Jeff Huson: 2006–present
- Ryan Spilborghs: 2014–present

== Beat writers ==
The Rockies also have beat writers who cover the team. The Colorado Rockies local beat writer for MLB.com is Thomas Harding.

The Colorado Rockies beat writer for the Rocky Mountain News was Tracy Ringolsby (1992–2008). Troy Renck covered the Rockies beat for The Denver Post from 2002 to 2013. Since 2014, the Rockies beat writers for the Post are Patrick Saunders and Nick Groke, who eventually left for The Athletic ahead of the 2018 season. DNVR Sports is the only other outlet with a daily beat reporter, originally using Drew Creasman before switching to Patrick Lyons following the 2021 season.

== See also ==
- List of current Major League Baseball announcers
