= Love Is Forever (Cliff Richard album) =

1965 studio album by Cliff Richard

Studio album by Cliff Richard
- Released: November 1965
- Recorded: Jun–Aug 1964, May–Jun 1965
- Studio: EMI Abbey Road, CBS 30th Street, New York City
- Genre: Pop, easy listening
- Label: Columbia
- Producer: Norrie Paramor, Bob Morgan, Billy Sherrill

Cliff Richard chronology
When in Rome (1965)	Love Is Forever (1965)	Kinda Latin (1966)

Professional ratings
Review scores
Source	Rating
Record Mirror	4/5 stars

Love Is Forever is the ninth studio album by Cliff Richard released in 1965 (sixteenth album overall). The album reached number 19 in the UK Album Charts, returning him to the chart after the failure of his last album When in Rome, and is primarily made up of pop standards such as "Long Ago (And Far Away)", "Have I Told You Lately That I Love You", and "Someday (You'll Want Me To Want You)".

The album was produced primarily by Richard's usual producer Norrie Paramor, but two songs "Everyone Needs to Love Someone" and "Through the Eye of a Needle", written by renowned song-writing duo Burt Bacharach and Hal David, were from Richard's August 1964 recording sessions in New York with Bob Morgan producing. Bob Morgan was from Epic Records, Richard's US record company at the time. "Paradise Lost" was recorded in Nashville and produced by Billy Sherrill.

== Track listing ==
Side A
No.	Title	Writer(s)	Detail	Length
1.	"Everyone Needs Someone to Love"	Burt Bacharach / Hal David	arranged & conducted by Gary Sherman	2:21
2.	"Long Ago (And Far Away)"	Ira Gershwin / Jerome Kern	arranged & conducted by Ken Woodman	2:36
3.	"(All Of My Sudden) My Heart Sings"	Rome / Jambian / Herpin	with the Norrie Paramor Orchestra and the Mike Sammes Singers	2:33
4.	"Have I Told You Lately That I Love You"	Scotty Wiseman	with the Shadows	2:52
5.	"Fly Me to the Moon"	Bart Howard	with the Norrie Paramor Orchestra	2:58
6.	"Theme From A Summer Place"	Mack Discant / Max Steiner	arranged & conducted by Ken Woodman	2:35
7.	"I Found a Rose"	Sid Tepper / Roy C. Bennett	with the Norrie Paramor Orchestra and the Mike Sammes Singers	2:46

Side B
No.	Title	Writer(s)	Detail	Length
1.	"My Foolish Heart"	Victor Young / Ned Washington	arranged & conducted by Ken Woodman	2:28
2.	"Through the Eye of a Needle"	Burt Bacharach / Hal David	arranged & conducted by Gary Sherman	2:44
3.	"My Colouring Book"	Fred Ebb / John Kander	with the Norrie Paramor Orchestra and the Mike Sammes Singers	3:28
4.	"I'll Walk Alone"	Sammy Cahn / Jule Styne	arranged & conducted by Ken Woodman	2:48
5.	"Someday (You'll Want Me to Want You)"	Hugh Starr	with the Shadows	2:25
6.	"Paradise Lost"	Estelle Loring / Kay Rogers		2:44
7.	"Look Homeward Angel"	Wally Gold	with the Norrie Paramor Orchestra and the Mike Sammes Singers	2:43

== Personnel ==
=== The Shadows ===
- Hank Marvin - lead guitar
- Bruce Welch - rhythm guitar
- Brian Bennett - drums
- John Rostill - bass guitar

=== Other ===
- The Norrie Paramor Orchestra - strings
- The Mike Sammes Singers - backing vocals

== Release formats ==
- Vinyl, LP, mono
