= Nayden Apostolov =

Bulgarian geographer, theorist, writer and professor (1948–2012)

- Найден Апостолов
- Born: 19 August 1948; Bogdan, Karlovo, Bulgaria
- Died: 22 October 2012 (aged 64); Varna, Bulgaria

Nayden Apostolov (Bulgarian: Найден Апостолов Najden Apostolov; 19 August 1948 – 22 October 2012) was a Bulgarian geographer, theorist, writer and professor at the Department of Economics and Organization of Tourism, faculty Management at University of Economics – Varna, Bulgaria.

== Biography ==
Nayden Apostolov was born in Bogdan, Karlovo, Bulgaria on 19 August 1948. Upon graduating from primary school in Karlovo, Bulgaria, he studied at the School of Industrial Chemistry in Dimitrovgrad from 1963 to 1967 and earned a diploma for secondary education on 30 July 1967 with a degree in technology of organic and inorganic substances and qualifications average chemist technologist. During the academic year 1969–70, he started his studies in geology in the geography department of Sofia University with a degree in geography. He graduated with honors on 13 November 1973 with qualification geographer and economics-geographer, a professor of geography and history in middle and high schools.

Prof. Nayden Apostolov worked as a deputy director in the know "PR Slaveykov" in Vratsa from 10 February 1974 to 1 October 1974. He then moved with his family in Karlovo, where he worked as an inspector at the District Council from 6 March to 4 November 1975. During this time he applied for the position of assistant at University of Economics (at this time called VINS "Dimitar Blagoev") Varna, won the competition and on 4 November 1975 he was appointed to the university. On 1 March 1978 he was promoted to senior assistant, and on 21 July 1983 – to assistant professor. On 3 January 1983 he was awarded the academic degree candidate of geographical sciences (currently PhD) of the Higher Attestation Commission after defending a thesis "Geographic systematization in studying the daily work commute trips in Bulgaria." On 5 July 1989 the Scientific Committee on Geology and Geography Sciences awarded him an associate professor title. He was Dean of the Center for Continuing Education from 1993 to 1995 and Head of the Department "Economics and Organization of Tourism" from 1993 to 1995.

Almost through all the years he was managing the prospective student committees exams in geography at the university. There are more than 30 publications, including 5 books – "Daily Labor Travel in Bulgaria", "Geography of Tourism", "Tourism resources", "Economics and Organization of Tourism" and "Geography of Tourism – one century of development and achievements". There are two specializations in Moscow (Russia) and Guildford (UK).

== Bibliography ==
Books

- (co-authored with George Traikov, Stefan Staykov Hrelev, Adrian Vasilev Andreev, Sarah Ivanov, Apostol Apostolov Atanasov, Konstantin Savov Kalinkov) Demographic situation and development of the settlement system. Varna: VINS D.Blagoev, 1984, p. 178
- (co-authored with Stefan Atanasov Tsonev Nedelcho Markov Enev, Elena Atanasova Petkova, Svetla Genova Rakadzhiyska, Hr. Coats, Marin Naidenov Neshkov, Belcheva Tatiana Hristova, Stefan Borisov Kachamakov M. Dzharkova M. Mladenova) State and prospects for development of business tourism and recreation workers in Veliko Tarnovo district for the period 1990 – 2000. Varna, VINS D.Blagoev, 1985, p. 264
- (co-authored with Elena Petrova Atanasova, Svetla Genova Rakadzhiyska Marin Naidenov Neshkov, Ivan Petkov Kalvachev, Belcheva Tatiana Hristova, Stefan Borisov Kachamakov, Stoyan Tanev Valchev) State and prospects for development of business tourism in the TP 'Balkanturist "- St. Zagora [to year 2000]. Varna, DP Strandzhata, 1989, p. 152
- Geography of Tourism – a century of development and achievements. Treatise. Varna, Science and Economics, 2013, p. 475

Textbooks

- (co-authored with P. Marin Buchvarov) Geography of Tourism: A textbook for university students. Varna: G.Bakalov, 1982, 311p.
- (co-authored with Nicolas Hristov Dimitrov, Stefan Staykov Hrelev, Marin Marinov Filipov, Svetla Genova Rakadzhiyska, Dimitrichka Koseva Koseva Stefko Ivanov, Konstantin Savov Kalinkov, Adrian Vasilev Andreev) Economics-geographical problems of perspective development and operation of the Bulgarian Black Sea coast. Varna, Strandzhata, 1986, 362p.
- (co-authored with Elena Petrova Atanasova, Stefan Atanasov Tsonev Nedelcho Markov Enev, Svetla Genova Rakadzhiyska, Marin Naidenov Neshkov, Belcheva Tatiana Hristova, Kosio Yordanov Kostadinov, Tanya Dabeva Philippova) Economics and Organization of Tourism (textbook for students of spec. International tourism at VINS Blagoev – Varna). Varna: G.Bakalov, 1987, 248p.
- Travel Resources. Varna, University Press ИУ, 2003, p. 388.
- (co-authored with Georgi Georgiev Chankov) Travel Resources. Blagoevgrad, University Press Neofit Bozveli, 2006, 583p.
- (co-authored with Ivan Markov) Travel Resources. Veliko Tyrnovo, ASTARTA, 2008, 479 p.

Articles

- Najden Apostolov, Unutargradska saobraċajna dostupnost gradova bugarske , Geographical Institute "Jovan Cvijic" SASA, 2007 No.57
- (co-authored with Viliyan Krastev Krastev) Scientific literature reviews geography of tourism. Varna, 2011, Н.2, pp. 134–141.
- Alternatives for the development of resorts, Varna – B: Science and Economics, 2010, pp. 661–664.
- (Co-authored with Marin Naidenov Neshkov) Tourist science and education in tourism in Bulgaria in the context of European experience – B: Economics and Management, 2008, N 3, pp. 29–47.
- The Tourism in the Bulgarian Seaside Villages. – В: Dokumentacja Geograficzna: Transformations of Rural Areas in Poland and Bulgaria: A Case Study, Warszawa, 2002, N: 27, с. 141–147.
- The geography of the geography of tourism in Central Europe. – In: Tourism in the XXI century, Sofia, 2002, pp. 400–406.
- Transport services to the population in Bulgaria. – In: Izv. Univ. Press, Varna, 2002, N: 1, pp. 41–51.
- (in collaboration with Marin Naidenov Neshkov) Tourism science at the end of XX century. – In: Economic and social development, Varna, UE, 2002, pp. 354–360.
- Inter-municipal bus lines in Bulgaria – functional and territorial conditioning. – In: Izv. Univ. Press, Varna, 1997, N: 2, pp. 43–57.
- Transportation zoning of Bulgaria. – In: Yearbook Univ. Econ. Varna, 67, 1995, pp. 3–53.
- Walter Christaller and his central place theory – In: Problems of Geography, 1994, N: 2, pp. 17–22.
- Touristische Verkehrstypologie der bulgarischen Heilbader. – В: Europaische Kurorte: Fakten und Perspektiven. Limburgerhof: FBV-Medien-Verl. GmbH, 1993, с. 245–249.
- (Co-authored by Todor Todorov Antonov) Tourist areas of Sweden. – In: Geography, 1982, N.5, pp. 12–14.
- Daily-traveling young people – issues of their employment and Komsomol activity. – In: Socio-demographic characteristics of youth and the importance and increase the efficiency of the Komsomol activity – Varna, 1985, pp. 56–64.
- Proposal project for administrative – territorial structure of Varna Municipality. – In: Problems of administrative – territorial structure of Bulgaria and functions of local government, Varna, 1990, pp. 111–115.
- Terminology and territorial peculiarities of work trips in PR Bulgaria. – In: HINE D.Blagoev – Varna, 53, 1981, N: 4, pp. 100–143.
- Typological studies in economic geography and their application in teaching geography. – In: Training in Geography, 1981, N: 5, pp. 10–15.
- Functional – territorial classification of passenger Railway Stations in Bulgaria. – In: HINE D.Blagoev – Varna, 1989, N: 2, pp. 152–163.
- Black Sea – area specific manifestation of daily commute trips. – In: Black Sea in 1300-year history of Bulgaria, Coll. Learn. Reports. – Varna: Union of Scientists. Workers in Bulgaria, 1981, pp. 273–287.

== Researches ==
- (co-authored with Tanya Dabeva Philippova, Georgina Georgieva Lukanova) Hospitality in Europe – categories, locations, development. Varna: PH Circle, 2000, 348 p.
- Studies of resorts – scientific scope and contemporary trends. Varna, Univ.press. Science and Economics, 2005, pp. 93–100.
