= Ethel Person =

American psychiatrist

Ethel Jane Spector Person Sherman Diamond (December 16, 1934 – October 16, 2012) was an American psychiatrist and psychoanalyst. Her work investigated sexual fantasy via an epidemiologic disease model.

== Life and career ==
Ethel Jane Spector was born in Louisville, Kentucky. Her mother was a mathematician, and her father, a bar owner, died when she was 12. She earned a bachelor's degree from University of Chicago in 1956 and earned her medical degree in 1960 from the New York University College of Medicine. She married engineer Allen Person; they divorced after 10 years. In 1968, she married psychiatrist Barry Sherman, who died in 1976. In 1978, she married lawyer Stanley Diamond, who died in 2009.

Person and Lionel Ovesey examined the etiology of transsexual people based on the developmental model of Margaret Mahler. Ovesey's model emphasized the child's separation-individuation anxiety producing a fantasy of symbiotic fusion with the mother which the transsexual tries to resolve by surgically becoming the mother. They investigated by interacting with patrons in pornography shops and sex clubs. Stephanie Burt observed that in her later writings, she concluded that "cross-gender disorders are disorders," because they can cause distress even without social prejudice. Person also researched love triangles and women's sexual needs.

Person died of Alzheimer's disease at her home in Manhattan, New York.

== Legacy ==
Many of Person's books are still in active circulation including The American Psychiatric Publishing Textbook of Psychoanalysis, which she edited along with Arnold M. Cooper and Glen O. Gabbard.

Person wrote and edited several specialized studies of Freud.

- On Freud's "A Child Is Being Beaten"
- On Freud's Group Psychology and the Analysis of the Ego (Contemporary Freud: Turning Points and Critical Issues Series)
- On Freud's "Creative Writers and Day-dreaming" (IPA - The Contemporary Freud: Turning Points and Critical Issues Series), co-edited with Servulo A. Figueira and Peter Fonagy
- On Freud's "Mourning and Melancholia" (Contemporary Freud Book Series), co-edited with Leticia Glocer Fiorini, Thierry Bokanowski, and Sergio Lewkowicz
- Freud's "On Narcissism: An Introduction" (IPA Contemporary Freud: Turning Points & Critical Issues Series), co-edited with Joseph Sandler and Peter Fonagy.

Two other research books by Ethel Person were published in the 1980s titled, Women--Sex and Sexuality, co-edited with Catharine R. Stimpson in 1980, and, Passionate Attachments: Thinking About Love, co-edited with Willard Gaylin circa 1988.

Person was one of the few academically oriented authors who was also able to write books for popular audiences on a host of psychologically and culturally relevant themes in contemporary culture. She wrote Dreams of Love and Fateful Encounters: The Power of Romantic Passion, from 2006, Feeling Strong: The Achievement of Authentic Power, from 2002, The Sexual Century, from 1999, and, By Force of Fantasy: How We Make Our Lives, from 1996.

== Selected publications ==
Books

- Feeling Strong: The Achievement of Authentic Power (2002)
- The Sexual Century (1999)
- By Force of Fantasy: How We Make Our Lives (1996)
- Dreams of Love And Fateful Encounters: The Power of Romantic Passion (1989)
- Women--Sex and Sexuality, edited by Catharine R. Stimpson and Ethel Spector Person. Chicago: University of Chicago Press, 1980.
- Passionate Attachments: Thinking About Love, edited by Willard Gaylin and Ethel Person. New York : London : Free Press; Collier Macmillan, c1988.

Articles

- Establishing trauma: The difficulty distinguishing between memories and fantasies (1994)
- Extreme boyhood femininity: Isolated behavior or pervasive disorder? (1985)
- The erotic transference in women and in men: Differences and consequences (1985)
- Psychoanalytic theories of gender identity (1983)
- Women in therapy: Therapist gender as a variable (1983)
- Sexuality as the mainstay of identity: Psychoanalytic perspectives (1980)
- The transsexual syndrome in males: I. Primary transsexualism (1974)
- The transsexual syndrome in males: II. Secondary transsexualism (1974)
- Gender identity and sexual psychopathology in men: A psychodynamic analysis of homosexuality, transsexualism, and transvestism (1973)
