= Samina Raja =

Pakistani poet

- Born: 11 September 1957; Bahawalpur, Punjab, Pakistan
- Died: 30 October 2012 (aged 51); Islamabad, Pakistan
- Education: Master of Arts
- Occupations: Poet, Writer, Editor, Educationist & Broadcaster
- Children: Daniall, Jeehad, Ehed
- Writing career
- Period: 1995 - 2008
- Genres: Ghazal, Nazm, Nasr
- Subject: Literature
- Notable works: Aur Wisal, Parikhana, Dil e Laila, Ishqabad
- Website: saminaraja.synthasite.com

Samina Raja (Urdu: ثمینہ راجہ 11 September 1957 AS INSCRIBED ON HER TOMBSTONE VERIFIED BY THE EDUCATIONAL CERTIFICATES – 30 October 2012) was a Pakistani Urdu poet, writer, editor, translator, educationist and broadcaster. She lived in Islamabad, Pakistan, and worked in the National Language Authority and National Book Foundation as a subject specialist.

== Early life ==
Raja was born in Bahawalpur, Pakistan. She gained a master's degree in Urdu literature from Punjab University in Lahore. She started writing poetry in 1973 and published twelve books of poetry, two Kulliyat and one selection of romantic poetry. She wrote some books in Urdu prose and edited and translated some valuable works of prose from English to Urdu.

Raja joined the National Book Foundation as a consultant and as editor of the monthly Kitab in 1998. In 1998 she also joined the monthly Aassar as an editor.

She conducted All Pakistan Mushairas since 1995 on Pakistan Television (PTV). She also presented the literary program Urdu Adab Mein Aurat Ka Kirdar ("The Role of Woman in Urdu Literature") on PTV.

Raja also as a subject specialist at the National Language Authority, Islamabad and was planning to bring out a new literary magazine Khwabgar (the Dream Maker). She had received two awards – Prime Minister Award and Writers Award – but she refused to accept them citing nomination of undeserving people along with her. Many a times she refused to participate in literary events where she believed that those named as chief guests had nothing to do with literature. Samina Raja demonstrated work by many unique techniques (ideas) of writing. One of her (ambition) was to translate the Quran in Urdu and convert the Urdu translation into poetry, which was never done by anyone in the world. She started her project without knowing that this will be the last project of her life, just before getting ill, she started with "Surah e Baqarah" and continued, but died before completing her work.

“she had a sensitive personality and used to care about the problems of every person no matter what their status was. Her death is a major loss to literature.”

Raja died of cancer in Islamabad on 31 October 2012. She was survived by three sons.

== Selected works ==
=== Books of poetry ===
She started writing in 1973 and published twelve collections of poetry.

- Huweda (1995)
- Shehr e saba (1997)
- Aur Wisal (1998)
- Khwabnaey (1998)
- Bagh e Shab (1999)
- Bazdeed (2000)
- Haft Aasman (2001)
- Parikhana (2002)
- Adan Ke Rastey Par (2003)
- Dil e Laila (2004)
- Ishqabad (2006)
- Hijr Nama (2008)

She also has published two Kulliyat and one selection of her poetry,

- Kitab e Khwab (2004)
- Kitab e Jan (2005)
- Woh Sham Zara Si Gehri Thi (2005)

=== Books of prose and translations ===
- Sharq Shanasi (Orientalism, 2005) translated by Edward Said
- Bartanvi Hind Ka Mustaqbil (Verdict on India, 2007) translated by Beverley Nichols

=== Editorship ===
Raja has also been the editor of four literary magazines

- Mustaqbil (1991–1994)
- Kitab (1998–2005)
- Aasar (1998–2004)
- Khwabgar (2008)
