= Lionel Ovesey =

American psychoanalyst (1915–1995)

Lionel Ovesey (15 April 1915 – 21 May 1995) was an American psychoanalyst.

== Biography ==
Ovesey was born in Manchuria to Ukrainian parents, who took him to the United States. He grew up in Los Angeles, and graduated from the University of California in 1937 and the University of California Medical School in 1941. He interned at the Los Angeles County General Hospital, and spent four years in the United States Army. With Abram Kardiner, Ovesey wrote The Mark of Oppression: A Psychosocial Study of the American Negro. Published in 1951, it became a landmark study of the effect of contemporary culture on the black middle class. His wife was advertising executive Regina Ovesey.

Ovesey's notion of pseudohomosexuality was one of the important developments that followed the Kinsey Report of 1948. Ovesey is also known for developing a taxonomy of male-to-female transsexual sexuality with Ethel Person, based on the developmental model of Margaret Mahler. Ovesey's model emphasized the child's separation-individuation anxiety producing a fantasy of symbiotic fusion with the mother which the transsexual tries to resolve by surgically becoming his mother.

== Selected publications ==
- Kardiner A., Ovesey L. (1951). The Mark of Oppression: Explorations in the Personality of the American Negro. Meridian Books
- Ovesey L. (1969). Homosexuality and Pseudohomosexuality. Science House, ISBN 0-87668-017-1
- Ovesey L. Psychoanalytic Theories of Gender Identity. In Person ES, ed. (1999). The Sexual Century. Yale University Press, 1999 ISBN 978-0-300-07604-2
- Ovesey L. The Transsexual Syndrome in Males: Primary Transsexualism. In Person ES, ed. (1999). The Sexual Century. Yale University Press, 1999 ISBN 978-0-300-07604-2
- Person E., Ovesey L. (1974). The transsexual syndrome in males. II. Secondary transsexualism. Am J Psychother 1974 Apr;28(2):174-93
- Kardiner A., Karush A., Ovesey L. A methodological study of Freudian theory. I. Basic concepts. Int J Psychiatry. 1966 Sep;2(5):489-544.

== See also ==
- Etiology of transsexualism
