= David N. Martin =

American advertising executive

David N. Martin (April 19, 1930 – October 2, 2012) was an American advertising executive. In 1965, Martin and his business partner, George Woltz, co-founded The Martin Agency, an advertising agency headquartered in Richmond, Virginia. Martin also created the iconic tourism advertising slogan, Virginia is for Lovers, to market the U.S. state of Virginia as a tourist destination. In 2012, Advertising Age called Virginia is for Lovers, which was first unveiled in 1969, "one of the most iconic ad campaigns in the past 50 years." The advertising campaign is still used by Virginia as of 2016.

== Biography ==
=== Early life ===
Martin was born in Tucson, Arizona, on April 19, 1930. His father, Hawley Phillips Martin, worked as the director of advertising and communications for the Southern States Cooperative and later became the Richmond branch of a Washington D.C. ad agency. He attended Thomas Jefferson High School in Richmond. Martin obtained his bachelor's degree in social science in 1952 from Hampden–Sydney College in Hampden Sydney, Virginia.

=== Career ===
Martin's career after college began as an editorial cartoonist for a newspaper published once a week. He then joined the staff of VanSant Dugdale, an ad agency based in Baltimore, where he drew storyboards and wrote scripts for television commercials. He briefly worked in New York City during his early career, where he worked as a television producer, creating live content for The Today Show and The Tonight Show on NBC.

He moved back to Richmond, Virginia, in 1956 to take a position with Cargill & Wilson. Martin was promoted to partner and vice president of account services within the company.

Martin and business partner, George Woltz, founded their ad agency, Martin & Woltz, in 1965. In 1975, Martin and Woltz agreed to divide the firm, which Martin renamed The Martin Agency. His company Martin's until 1986, when The Martin Agency was sold to Scali, McCabe, Sloves. (In turn, Scali, McCabe, Sloves was later acquired by the Interpublic Group of Companies). David Martin retired from The Martin Agency in 1988, two years after selling the ad agency.

Martin is perhaps best known as the "brainchild" behind the famous Virginia is for Lovers tourism campaign, which was first launched in 1969. He was a member of the team which created the slogan. Martin publicly credited Robin McLaughlin, an advertising copyeditor, with writing the original tagline, "Virginia is for history lovers." Martin approved of McLaughlin's work, but suggested that they omit the word "history" from the slogan. The rest of the advertising team agreed with Martin's suggestion, leading to the iconic Virginia is for Lovers campaign.

He remained in advertising after leaving The Martin Agency. He soon opened a new agency, Hawley Martin Partners, with his brother, Stephen H. "Steve" Martin. The firm was named for their father. Martin served the agency's creative plans director and chairman, while Steve Martin was the company's president and CEO. Interpublic Group acquired Hawley Martin Partners in 1993. Interpublic merged it with Fahlgren and renamed the new agency, which was based in Atlanta, as Fahlgren Martin. Fahlgren Martin was next purchased by Arnold Worldwide in 1995, which combined it Finnegan & Agee, another acquisition, to create Arnold Finnegan Martin.

While Martin largely retired from advertising in 1995 to pursue writing and painting, he continued to partner with his sons for other ventures. In 1999, Martin co-founded and served as the chairman of Martin Branding Worldwide with his son, Rob Martin. One year later, Martin launched another company, BrandSync, with his younger son, Dave H. Martin, in 2000.

He also served as a regional head for Associated Actors and Artistes of America (4As), a performing arts trade union federation.

Martin died from cancer on October 2, 2012, at the age of 82. He was survived by his wife, Ann Louise; four children - Sarah Martin Herguner, Susan Mitchell, Robert Martin and David Martin; and nine grandchildren.

=== Recognitions ===
Martin received many awards and recognitions during his career. The Richmond Ad Club named him "Advertising Person of the Year" in 1969, the same year that the Virginia is for Lovers ad campaign was launched. Virginia Commonwealth University also inducted him into its Mass Communications Hall of Fame in 1987. In 2012, a portrait of Martin by Louis Briel, an artist from Richmond, was added to the collection of the Smithsonian Institution's National Portrait Gallery in Washington D.C.

=== Painting and writing ===
Martin also pursued writing. He published two books specifically dealing with marketing and branding - "Romancing the Brand" and "Be the Brand: How to Find a Powerful Identity and Use It to Drive Sales." He also wrote and released two novels, "Under a Lemon Moon" and "Where the Whores Dance at Midnight."

He also began painting after working with painter and illustrator Norman Rockwell on an ad campaign for Colonial Williamsburg. Martin painted approximately eighty pieces during his life.
