= Clive Emmanuel =

British academic (1947–2012)

Clive R. Emmanuel (1947–7 October 2012) was a British academic, who held the Ernst & Young Chair of Accountancy at the University of Glasgow from 1987 to 2011.

At the start of his career, Emmanuel took a job at the Steel Company of Wales in Port Talbot from 1964 as assistant cost accountant and later organisation and methods officer. After completing a part-time HNC in business studies, he went on to study economics at the University of Wales Institute of Science and Technology. In 1971 he then took an MA in financial control at Lancaster University, where he also completed a PhD on corporate transfer pricing.

Emmanuel took up an academic post at Lancaster in 1974. During this time he worked on the development of courses for behavioural elements of management accounting and co-authored a textbook, Accounting for Management Control (1985). He also worked at the University College of Wales, Aberystwyth as a senior lecturer.

In 1987 Emmanuel moved to the University of Glasgow to take up the Ernst & Young Chair of Accountancy, a post he held until retirement. He was presented with the Lifetime Achievement Award of the British Accounting and Finance Association (BAFA) in April 2012 to recognise his contribution to the field.
