= Bill Gardner (rugby union) =

- Born: William Charles Gardner; 2 March 1929 Fennell Bay, New South Wales
- Died: 9 October 2012 (aged 83) Toronto, NSW Australia
- School: Fassifern Public Broadmeadow High
- Notable relative(s): sister Greta Young brother Harold (Digger) Gardner (dec) Grandchildren: Joel, Jarryd, Jessica, Jacqueline, Blair, Jenna, Georgia, Danielle, Ashley, Noah and Isabelle
- Occupation: Moulder

Rugby union career
- Position: fullback
Amateur team(s)
Years	Team	Apps	(Points)
- Toronto Boolaroo Wanderers
International career
Years	Team	Apps	(Points)
1950–50	Wallabies	1	(6)

Official website
- Bills short representative career in Rugby Union ended when he fell ill with Polio

William Charles Gardner (2 March 1929 – 9 October 2012) was a rugby union player who represented Australia.

Gardiner, a fullback, claimed 1 international rugby cap for Australia.
