= George Dessart =

George Baldwin Dessart (August 27, 1925 - October 20, 2012) was an American television producer and executive and served as national chairman of the American Cancer Society from 1996–98.

Dessart began his career in television at WCAU in Philadelphia, Pennsylvania and was the producer of What in the World. He received an EMMY at the New York EMMY awards in 1965 as producer for "Eye on New York". His career at CBS as Vice President of Program Practices ended in 1985.

With William Baker, he co-authored the book, "Down the Tube: An inside account of the failure of American television" in 1998.

According to Lloyd Morrisett, George Dessart was one of the first candidates to be considered for the position of executive producer of Sesame Street.

“The executive producer was, from the creative point of view, obviously key. We put together a list of candidates and George Dessart was our first candidate and the one we really went after. We tried to recruit him very strongly. George thought about it, and finally he told us that he just wasn't right for it. We were really despondent over that decision. He was exactly right. He probably would have been terrible. He was a fine producer, but for this job, he was not right for it although we thought he was.”

In Michael Davis’ 2008 book, Street Gang: The Complete History of Sesame Street, Dessart is credited with the suggestion to use a commercial format (e.g., “Sesame Street is brought to you by the letter “P” and the number “2”) to “sell” letters and numbers to children.

George Dessart was professor emeritus at Brooklyn College and lived in San Francisco, California.
