= Raphael E. Freundlich =

German-born Israeli classical scholar, humanist and Latinist

Raphael E. Freundlich (January 16, 1928 – October 12, 2012) was a classical scholar, humanist and Latinist trained in structural linguistics. He was a professor emeritus at Tel Aviv University in Israel. His fields of study and teaching included: ancient Greek, Biblical studies and classical Latin.

He was born in Germany in 1928 but escaped with his parents to Palestine via Venice, Italy. He became a scholar among the great classical scholars and structural linguists. He was a colleague and a friend of Professor Haiim B. Rosen, considered one of the greatest structuralists of European Structural linguistics of the 20th century.

Freundlich retired to the United States where he taught in Texas a few selected students. He died in California on October 12, 2012. He used to say in Latin: "Tu ne cede malis, sed contra audientior ito!" (never surrender to evil but with greater determination go against it)

== Sources ==
- <https://books.google.com/books?id=TKnAWRB8N8EC&pg=PA1&dq=Hannah+and+haim+Rosen+linguistics+Tel-Aviv>
- <https://books.google.com/books?id=os9TMERY9OsC&pg=PA351>

== Publications ==
- https://www.amazon.com/Raphael-Freundlich/e/B001K6IO2O

for more references on structural linguistic See: "intrinsecus" by Raphael Freundlich See: Hans Jacob Polotsky; Hannah Rosen also See: Haiim B Rosen book " half a century of European linguistic " vedasi etiam: Pierre Swiggers
