= Chacha Pakistani =

Pakistani flag-raising enthusiast

Baba Mehar Din
- Chacha Pakistani
- Born: 1922; Chandrani, Punjab, British India
- Died: 21 October 2012 (aged 89–90); Lahore, Pakistan
- Resting place: Chandrani, Punjab, Pakistan

Baba Mehar din (1922 - 21 October 2012), better known as Chacha Pakistani or "Uncle Pakistan", was a Pakistani man who was known for his daily appearance, dressed in a kurta made of a Pakistani flag, at the flag hoisting ceremony at the border point of Wagha. He made the 40 km journey from his home at Chandrai each day by hitch-hiking.

Aged 90 he had remained unmarried, living with his nephews.

== Honors ==
Former president Pervez Musharraf sent him to Umrah on political quota. Furthermore, he was also awarded by many rangers and army officials.
