= Merkley+Partners =

- Formerly: Merkley Newman Harty
- Type: Subsidiary
- Industry: Advertising agency
- Founded: 1993; 33 years ago
- Founders: Parry Merkley; Jane Newman; Steve Harty
- Headquarters: New York City, New York, United States
- Key people: Alex Gellert (Chief Executive Officer); Roger Morales (Chief Financial Officer); Cynthia Davis (Chief Client Officer); Jennifer Cimmino (Chief Digital Officer)
- Number of employees: 200+
- Parent: Omnicom Group
- Website: merkleyandpartners.com

Merkley+Partners is a full-service advertising agency located in New York City. It is a wholly owned subsidiary of Omnicom Group, and a member of DAS. Currently the agency has 225 employees.

The agency is currently managed by Chief Executive Officer Alex Gellert and Executive Creative Director / Chairman Andy Hirsch. They joined the agency in 1999. Scott Gelber was named President in 2018.

The agency, originally named Merkley Newman Harty, was founded in 1993 by Parry Merkley, Creative Director, Steve Harty, Client Services Director, and Jane Newman, Strategic Planning Director. The three founders came together with the intent of removing the boundaries between their respective disciplines.

== Recent awards ==
- Silver New York ADDY for Mercedes-Benz, 2012
- Silver ADDY for best public service campaign, Gold New York ADDY, Silver New York ADDY District Silver ADDY, and Communication Arts Award for the Ad Council Campaign Lead Poisoning Prevention, 2011
