= Chronox Manek =

Papua New Guinean lawyer

Chronox Manek (died 1 October 2012) was the Chief Ombudsman of Papua New Guinea from 2008 until September 2012. He hailed from Wambangan village, Boana District, in the Morobe Province and joined the Ombudsman Commission on 3 July 2008. He retired from his position in September 2012 due to declining health.

Manek survived a 2009 assassination attempt in which he was shot in the arm by four assailants.

== Biography ==
Manek was originally from Wambangan village in the Boana District of Morobe Province. He held a Bachelor of Laws from the University of Papua New Guinea, as well as a Master of Laws from Melbourne Law School, Australia.

In 1999, Manek was appointed to the position of Public Solicitor of Papua New Guinea. In 2001, he was appointed Public Prosecutor of Papua New Guinea and also served as co-Chairman of the International Association of Prosecutors World Conference in Copenhagen, Denmark; Director of Asia Crime Prevention and Foundation; Director on the International Ombudsman Institute; Vice-Chairman of the Pacific Ombudsman Alliance and he was elected as an Executive Committee Member of the International Association of Anti-Corruption Authorities (IAACA).

Manek investigated charges of corruption by public figures, including former Prime Minister Sir Michael Somare, and as such, was the target of attacks against him. In December 2009, he was met with gun fire from attackers when returning home, and narrowly escaped death after being shot.

Politicians, including the coalition government led by Prime Minister Sir Michael Somare, had tried to rein in the powers of Manek’s state corruption watchdog, by introducing legal amendments in a bill named the Maladina Bill, designed to undermine the Ombudsman Commission. In May 2010, over 7500 citizens peacefully protested in the streets of Port Moresby against the controversial draft law.

Manek left his position due to illness in September 2012. He died after a lengthy illness on 1 October 2012. Transparency International Papua New Guinea called his death a great loss for the country.
