= John Evans (artist) =

American artist (1932–2012)

- Born: August 24, 1932; Sioux Falls, South Dakota, U.S.
- Died: October 5, 2012 (aged 80); East Village, New York, U.S.
- Movement: Neo-Dada
- Spouse: Margaret Evans
- Children: Twin daughters, India and Honor Evans

John Evans (August 24, 1932 – October 5, 2012) was an American artist, known for his daily collages made from found objects in the East Village of New York City.

== Life and career ==
Born in Sioux Falls, South Dakota, Evans grew up in California and went to high school in Redondo Beach. He later studied at the School of the Art Institute of Chicago, where he received his bachelor's degree in 1961 and his Master of Fine Arts in 1963. He moved to New York in 1963, settling on Avenue B.

Evans is best known for his collages made from found objects of the streets of the East Village of New York City. Using business cards, flyers, cigarette packs, newspaper clippings, product stickers, ticket stubs, and random photos, Evans assembled one collage a day – from 1964 to 2000 – on painted sheets of 8 1/2 by 11 inch notebook paper.

Sometimes described as mini time capsules, his work documented and reflected on major events such as the end of the Vietnam War, economic fluctuations in the city, and the devastation caused by the AIDS crisis, all from the perspective of an East Village artist and made from the fragments discarded or lost by its residents.

The collages are also autobiographical, visual diaries; each one is stamped with the day's date. They are composed of personal ephemera including postcards, gallery openings, reviews of his exhibitions, poetry, snapshots, and other connections to Evans' daily life.

Evans figured prominently in the New York Neo-Dada community, which included Buster Cleveland, Albert Fine, Ray Johnson, and May Wilson.

== Mail Art ==
In 1964 Ray Johnson introduced Evans to the international Mail Art underground. Initially, the works went from one artist to the next, with each adding additional embellishments before mailing it. Here Evans began using the stamp "Avenue B School of Art", referencing the neighborhood in which he lived and where the art originated.

This is the address Evans used for his Mail Art: John Evans, Avenue B. School of Art, 199 E. 3rd Street - 2B, NEW YORK, NY 10009, USA.

Robert M. Murdock, independent curator and writer, and author of John Evans, Collages, writes: "Through Ray Johnson's New York Correspondance [sic] School, Evans became involved in the international Mail Art movement during the 1960s, a hybrid of art and communication that included cartoon-like drawings, fictitious postage stamps and rubber-stamped images, all sent through the postal system."

== Collections ==
Evans' work can be found in several museums and art collections.

In 2013, Margaret Evans, John's widow, donated a sizable collection the Smithsonian, including:

- Letters, 1957-2012
- Writings, 1983-1991
- Subject Files, 1970s-2012
- Mail Art Projects, 1986-2012

== Exhibitions ==
- 2004, Oct. 14th – Nov. 13th. John Evans: As Days Go By. Pavel Zoubok Gallery, New York
- 2016, Jan. 28th – Feb. 27th. Loisaidada: John Evans, Buster Cleveland, and Scarlatina Lust. Pavel Zoubok Gallery, New York

== Publications ==
- John Evans, Collages. (authors: John Evans, Robert M. Murdock.) Published by: Quantuck Lane Press, 2004. Google Books.
- Small Scale Subversion: Mail Art & Artistamps. Google Books
