= Carina (Corrado Lojacono song) =

Single by Corrado Lojacono
- Released: 1958
- Songwriter(s): Corrado Lojacono, Alberto Testa.

"Carina" is a 1958 hit song written by Italian singer Corrado Lojacono under the pseudonym of composer "R. Poes", to Italian lyrics by Alberto Testa. He recorded the song himself in 1958 as the B-side to "Brivido Blu", but the song became his most successful song as a songwriter. The sheet music carried the names of six other Italian male singers who immediately recorded versions including Fred Buscaglione, and internationally the song was recorded by Sophia Loren, Caterina Valente, Eddie Constantine, René Carol in Germany and Cliff Richard (on When in Rome). Lojacono's own recording was re-released as an A-side in 1959. The tune was also recorded as an instrumental by the Ray Ellington Quartet. The lyrics begin "Carina, allegra e spensierata sei carina" (Pretty, cheerful and carefree you're pretty).
