= Warsame Shire Awale =

- Born: c. 1951
- Died: 29 October 2012 (aged 61)
- Occupations: Poet, playwright and songwriter

Warsame Shire Awale (Somali: Warsame Shireh Awaale, Arabic: ورسمه شيري اوال) (c. 1951 – 29 October 2012) was a prominent Somali poet, playwright and songwriter. He was assassinated in Mogadishu, Somalia's capital, becoming the 18th media figure killed in the country in 2012. Islamist militants Al-Shabaab (militant group) are believed to have been behind most of the murders.

== Career ==
Awale was one of the founding members of the Onkod police band, and was a prominent personality on the Somali art scene for over three decades. He composed many romantic and patriotic songs, as well as comedic events and functional literature.

Awale was a popular media figure on Radio Kulmiye's staff. There, he urged local youth to oppose violence and instead support the national government. Additionally, Awale wrote and performed in various socially themed radio plays, where he charged the Al-Shabaab insurgent group of leading people astray under the guise of Islam.

== Death ==
On 29 October 2012, Awale was assassinated by two unidentified gunmen as he was heading home in the capital. The National Union of Somali Journalists indicated that prior to his assassination, Awale had been subjected to death threats on account of his artistic pieces urging residents to join the police. Although no group claimed responsibility for his murder and Al-Shabaab denied involvement, the insurgent group is believed to have been behind it, as the assassination was characteristic of the group's modus operandi.

Awale was 61 at the time of his murder.
