= Joseph Rosenmiller =

American businessman

Joseph Rosenmiller (February 17, 1925 – October 14, 2012) was an American businessman and philanthropist. Rosenmiller, along with Yale classmate Peter Bordes, founded Greater Media, a media company specializing in radio in the eastern United States. Greater Media was known for spearheading the "magic radio" format.

After retiring from Greater Media Rosenmiller donated to the Solidago Foundation, and later ran it. He also was the founder of Volunteer Opportunities.

Rosenmiller attended Yale and Columbia University and served as a reconnaissance officer in World War II.
