= François Arnal =

French painter and sculptor

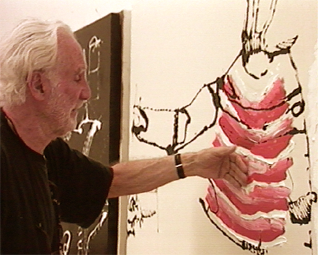
- François Arnal in 1995
- Born: 2 October 1924; La Valette-du-Var, France
- Died: 28 October 2012 (aged 88); Paris, France
- Known for: Painter and sculptor

François Arnal (2 October 1924 – 28 October 2012) was a French painter and sculptor.

Born and raised in a rural area of France, he was educated in Toulon high school and studied law at the University of Aix-en-Provence. Towards the end of the war he joined the resistance, where the Dutch refugee Conrad Kickert taught him the rudiments of painting.

After the war he took up painting seriously and moved to Paris, where he associated with established artists such as Pierre Dmitrienko, Serge Rezvani and Bernard Quentin, becoming involved in the lyrical abstraction movement. In 1960 he turned his attention to sculpture and spent much of his time in the United States, working and exhibiting.

In the mid-1960s he settled in Paris and experimented with "bombardments", whereby he traced the shapes of objects with spray paint. In 1968 he set up Atelier A (Workshop A) to publicise the work of designers of such everyday things as chairs, tables and lamps. In 1975 he returned to painting and sculpture and also began writing novels and plays.

He died in Paris in 2012.

== Selected works ==
- L'Éclipse, 1954, oil on canvas, 54.5 × 33 cm, Musée d'Évreux (Évreux museum).
- Série des élémentaires pour une dynamique blanche, 1980, acrylic on canvas, 176 × 175 cm, Musée d'art de Toulon (Toulon Art Museum)
- Les sombres fêtes de la chair (The Dark Feasts of the Flesh), 1957, oil on canvas, 150 x 200 cm, Art Institute of Chicago AIC
