= Abba Bina =

Papua-New Guinean businessman

Abba Bina (died October 2012), best known as Mr. Shit, was a Papua New Guinean businessman and former celebrated political aspirant.

== Early and working life ==
Bina was born in Gembogl in the Eastern Highlands Province. After spending a year studying arts at the University of Papua New Guinea, Bina dropped out and joined the PNG Defence Force. In 1982, Bina served as an aide to PNG Governor-General Tore Lokoloko. After retiring from the military in 1984, he started a business selling Areca nut (buai in Tok Pisin). In 1986, he joined the National Court in the Sheriff's office, eventually becoming the Chief Sheriff. He resigned in 1991.

== Business career ==
Bina began operating a manure business in Port Moresby using the name Mr Shit in the early 1990s, with his slogan "Chicken shit, horse shit, cow shit -- but no bullshit" on his business card.

== Political aspirant ==
Bina ran for the National Parliament of Papua New Guinea during the 1997 election. He was denied permission to use the name "Mr Shit", a factor used to explain his poor showing in the election.

In 2000 Bina was included in the documentary The Big Picture: Paradise Imperfect. Bina died in 2012 in Port Moresby from undisclosed causes.

== Death ==
Bina died in October 2012 and was buried in his home village in the Eastern Highlands.
