= Regina Ovesey =

American advertising executive

- Born: February 4, 1921; Philadelphia, Pennsylvania
- Died: December 13, 2003 (aged 82); Manhattan
- Education: Stanford University
- Occupations: Founder and CEO of Ovesey & Company

Regina Haimo Ovesey (4 February 1921 – 13 December 2003) was an American advertising executive. She founded Ovesey & Company, and was the first female CEO of an agency recognized by the American Association of Advertising Agencies.

Ovesey was born in Philadelphia, Pennsylvania. She grew up in Los Angeles, and graduated from Stanford University, Phi Beta Kappa. After founding Ovesey & Company in the 1940s, she ran Regina Ovesey, Inc. (later Ovesey Straus, Inc. and ultimately Ovesey, Berlow Straus, Inc.). She was the co-director of the Public Advertising System at the School of Visual Arts.

Her husband was noted psychoanalyst Lionel Ovesey and they had two daughters. She died of lung cancer in Manhattan on December 13, 2003.

== Selected publication ==
Ovesey, Regina (1980). The Last Word: Exploring Careers in Contemporary Communication. R. Rosen Press
