= International Association of Anti-Corruption Authorities =

Non-governmental organization

The International Association of Anti-Corruption Authorities (IAACA) is an independent and non-political anti-corruption organization established at its inaugural Annual Conference and General Meeting held in Beijing, China in October 2006. The main objective of the organization is to promote the effective implementation of the UN Convention Against Corruption, adopted by the United Nations General Assembly on 31 October 2003, and to assist anti-corruption authorities in the world in preventing and fighting against corruption. Currently, over 195 ACAs from different countries and jurisdictions have joined IAACA as members.

In January 2022, Hong Kong ICAC took over the office of the IAACA Secretariat.

== Governance ==
The IAACA Executive Committee (ExCo) was elected by the General Meeting held on 5 February 2025. It consists of a President, three Vice-Presidents, 15 Organizational and Honorary Members, two Advisers, an Observer and the Secretary-General. To further expand IAACA’s global reach, the ExCo co-opted the Office of the Comptroller General (CGU) of Brazil and the UAE Accountability Authority (UAEAA) as ExCo members at the first IAACA ExCo meeting of 2025 on 15 May 2025. Latest membership of the IAACA ExCo are:

President

Mr Danny Y M Woo, Commissioner, Hong Kong ICAC

Vice Presidents (in alphabetical order of country)

H.E. Mr Farid Ahmadov, Minister of Justice, Ministry of Justice, Republic of Azerbaijan

Dr Giuseppe Busia, President, National Anti-Corruption Authority, Italy

Mr Leonard Gaoretelelwe Lekgetho, Head, Special Investigating Unit, South Africa

Honorary Member

Dr Eduardo Vetere, Former Vice-President of IAACA, Former Director of the Division for Treaty Affairs, UNODC

Members (in alphabetical order of country)

Mr Marcelo Pontes Vianna, Secretary for Private Sector Integrity, Office of the Comptroller General, Brazil

Mr Syed Azmal Syed Ali, Director, Anti-Corruption Bureau, Brunei Darussalam

Ms Alexandra Rogkakou, Governor, National Transparency Authority, Greece

Mr Ferenc Pál Biró, President, Integrity Authority, Hungary

Mr Abdi Ahmed Mohamud, Secretary/Chief Executive Officer, Ethics and Anti-Corruption Commission, Kenya

Dato' Sri Abd Halim Bin Aman, Chief Commissioner, Malaysian Anti-Corruption Commission, Malaysia

Mr Titrudeo Dawoodarry, Director-General, Financial Crimes Commission, Mauritius

H.E. Mohamed Benalilou, Chairman, National Authority for Probity, Prevention and Fight Against Corruption, Morocco

Mr Ioan-Viorel Cerbu, Chief Prosecutor of the Directorate, National Anticorruption Directorate, Romania

H.E. Mazin bin Ibrahim Al-Kahmous, President, Oversight and Anti-Corruption Authority, Saudi Arabia

Mr Moustapha Ka, President, National Office for Combating Fraud and Corruption, Senegal

Mr Sam Tee, Director, Corrupt Practices Investigation Bureau, Singapore

Mr Alejandro Luzón Cánovas, Chief Prosecutor, Special Public Prosecution Office Against Corruption and Organised Crime, Spain

HE Humaid Obaid Abushibs, Chairman, UAE Accountability Authority, United Arab Emirates

Advisers

Hon. Tan Sri Hj. Abu Kassim bin Mohamed, Former Vice-President of IAACA, Chairman, National Anti-Financial Crime Centre, Malaysia

Mr Giovanni Kessler, Former Executive Member of IAACA, Former Director-General, European Anti-Fraud Office

Observer

Ms Brigitte Strobel-Shaw, Director ad interim of the Division for Treaty Affairs, UNODC

Secretary-General

Mr Chin Kit Cheung, Assistant Director of International Cooperation, Independent Commission Against Corruption, Hong Kong SAR, China
