= Mark Brovun =

Ukrainian art director (1946–2012)

Mark Matviyovych Brovun
- Марк Матвійович Бровун
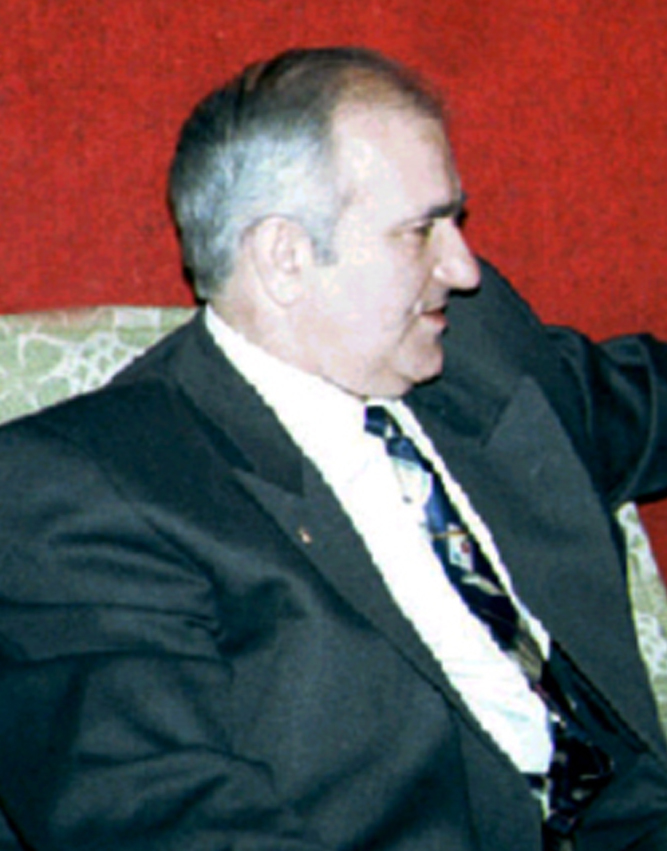
- photograph of Mark Brovun, taken by Anastasia Fedorenko, 2000
- Born: July 24, 1946; Stalino, Ukrainian SSR
- Died: October 9, 2012 (aged 66)
- Occupation: Art director
- Awards: Honoured worker of culture of Ukraine, full Chevalier of the Order of Merit
- Website: Donetsk Regional Academical Ukrainian Musical Drama Theatre

Mark Brovun (24 July 1946 – 9 October 2012) was a Ukrainian cultural employee, awardee of Taras Shevchenko National Prize of Ukraine, Art Director of Donetsk National Musical and Drama Theatre.

== Biography ==
Brovun was born on 24 July 1946 in Stalino (present day - Donetsk). He graduated from the Faculty of Economics, Donetsk National University and later from the Faculty of Stage Management at Lugansk State Institute for Culture and Arts. Brovun was a coach for Donetsk oblast' and the USSR military all-round teams; under his leadership USSR team repeatedly won the games, and in 1974 it won the Soviet Union championship. In 1976 he arrived at the Donetsk Academical Ukrainian Musical Drama Theatre, and in 1987 took charge of it. In 2009 he was appointed the Art director of the theatre. Brovun is the author of the concept and the permanent host of the monthly TV program about theatre "U kamina" (eng. - By the fireplace) that had been appearing at the regional television for more than 10 years. He was also the initiator of the regional theater festival "Theatrical Donbass" and of the open festival for children and youth "Golden Key".

== Public activities ==
In 1990 - 1994 Brovun was a member of Voroshilovsky district council (Donetsk). He performed duties of deputy chairman of Donetsk branch of the National Union of Theater Workers of Ukraine for 10 years. He was also the Deputy of Donetsk Oblast' Council of the 4th, 5th and 6th convocations and the Chairman of the standing committee on culture issues.

== Awards ==
- 1993 - title Honored Worker of Culture of Ukraine
- 1997 - awardee of the National Union of Theater Workers prize
- 2003 - Taras Shevchenko National Prize in the field of theatrical art, for staging Eneyida by Kotlyarevsky
- Full Chevalier of Order of Merit
- Full Chevalier of the Miner's Glory Medal
- Diploma of Verkhovna Rada of Ukraine, Diploma of the Cabinet of Ministers of Ukraine, also he has been repeatedly awarded diplomas of the Ministry of Culture and Tourism of Ukraine, Donetsk Oblast' Council, Donetsk Oblast' state administration

== See also ==
- Donetsk National Academic Ukrainian Musical and Drama Theatre
- Donetsk
