= Dessie Kane =

Irish cricketer

Personal information
- Full name: Terrence Desmond McKibbin Kane
- Born: 10 May 1952; Derry, Northern Ireland
- Died: 19 October 2012 (aged 60); Jordanstown, Northern Ireland
- Source: ESPNcricinfo, 23 June 2016

Terrence Desmond McKibbin Kane (10 May 1952 – 19 October 2012) was an Irish cricketer. He played one List A match for Ireland in 1981.
