= Michael Daniel Ambatchew =

Ethiopian children's book writer

- Born: 7 March 1967; Moscow, Russia
- Died: 25 October 2012 (aged 45)
- Education: Addis Ababa University
- Occupation: Writer
- Writing career
- Genre: Children's picture books

Michael Daniel Ambatchew (1967-2012) was an Ethiopian children's book writer. He has written Sidama Tales and Alemayehu. Although an admirer of Western stories like Puss in Boots, he has been active in improving the publishing of a more native Ethiopian children's literature, and has also written on literature in general.

== Life and career ==
Michael was born in Moscow to an Ethiopian father and an Indian mother He attended Addis Ababa University, earning a Bachelor of Arts degree in 1987.

== Selected works ==
=== Books ===
- Animal Tales of Sidama (1998)
- Bongani in Addis (1998)
- A Cluster of Rejections (1999)
- Alemayehu (2006)
- Mimi Mystery (2012)
