= Enrico di Robilant =

- Born: 1924
- Died: 10 October 2012
- Occupation: Philosopher

Enrico di Robilant (1924 – 10 October 2012) was an Italian philosopher of law. He taught philosophy of law and political philosophy at the University of Turin (Faculty of Law), where he had been a follower of Norberto Bobbio. He focused his attention on classical liberalism, Canon Law, libertarian legal theory, and the relationship between Catholicism and Law.

== Publications ==
- L'inaccettabilità del potere assoluto dello stato in materia fiscale, in Fisco e libertà, ed. Veniero del Punta, E. di Robilant et al. (Roma, Armando Armando 1981).
