= Thomas Harding (sailor) =

- Born: 1837; Middletown, Connecticut
- Died: Unknown
- Military career
- Allegiance: United States
- Branch: United States Navy
- Rank: Captain of the forecastle
- Unit: (United States Navy) USS Dacotah
- Conflicts: American Civil War
- Awards: Medal of Honor

Thomas Harding (born 1837, date of death unknown) was a Union Navy sailor in the American Civil War who received the U.S. military's highest decoration, the Medal of Honor, for attempting to save an officer from drowning.

Harding was born in 1837 in Middletown, Connecticut. He served during the Civil War as a captain of the forecastle on the USS Dacotah. On June 9, 1864, the blockade runner Pevensey was chased down, run aground near Beaufort, North Carolina, and suffered a boiler explosion. Harding and others took a small boat from Dacotah to Pevensey and loaded it with some of the blockade runner's cargo of arms and uniforms. While returning to Dacotah through heavy surf, the small boat began to take on water and sank. Harding tried to help an officer who could not swim, Acting Master's Mate Jarvis G. Farrar, but was unsuccessful and Farrar drowned. For this attempt, Harding was awarded the Medal of Honor six months later on December 31, 1864.

Harding's official Medal of Honor citation reads:

Served as captain of the forecastle on board the U.S.S. Dacotah on the occasion of the destruction of the blockade runner Pevensey, near Beauford [sic], N.C., 9 June 1864. "Learning that one of the officers in the boat, which was in danger of being, and subsequently was, swamped, could not swim, Harding remarked to him: 'If we are swamped, sir, I shall carry you to the beach or I will never go there myself.' He did not succeed in carrying out his promise, but made desperate efforts to do so, while others thought only of themselves. Such conduct is worthy of appreciation and admiration--a sailor risking his own life to save that of an officer."

== See also ==
- USS Dacotah
- Blockade Running
- Beaufort, North Carolina
