= J. Rufus Fears =

American historian

Jesse Rufus Fears (March 7, 1945 – October 6, 2012) was an American historian, scholar, educator, and author writing on the subjects of Ancient history, The History of Liberty, and classical studies. He is best known for his many lectures for the Teaching Company.

Fears was the David Ross Boyd Professor of Classics at the University of Oklahoma, where he held the G.T. and Libby Blankenship Chair in the History of Liberty. Fears joined the OU faculty in 1990, serving as Professor of Classics and Letters. Among his numerous honors and awards for teaching, Fears was selected three times by OU students as Professor of the Year and was named by the Oklahoma Foundation for Excellence as recipient of the Medal for Excellence in College and University Teaching. Fears earned his bachelor's degree Summa cum Laude in history and classics at Emory University and his Ph.D. from Harvard University. Prior to coming to OU, Fears held teaching positions at Indiana University and Boston University, where he served as Chair of the Department of Classical Studies. At Indiana University he was selected four times by IU students as Professor of the Year. Professor Fears had a reputation for drawing large numbers of students, and his lectures were over-attended; it was often said that no lecture hall on campus was large enough to accommodate the thousands of students who wished to sign up for his classes in History, Political Science, Classics and Letters.

== Literary and creative endeavors ==
Fears composed monographs and authored books such as “The Cult of Jupiter and Roman Imperial Ideology” and "The Theology of Victory at Rome.” He edited a three-volume edition of “Selected Writings of Lord Acton,” and had released more than a dozen titles for The Great Courses lecture series. Fears also taught a Great Books course offered through OU Outreach's Osher Lifelong Learning Institute to Senior Citizens in both Norman, Oklahoma and Oklahoma City, Oklahoma.

Fears also lectured across the country and was a regular guest on the Rusty Humphries Show. At the time of his death, he was writing a book entitled "Dangerous Delusions: Why We Ignore the Lessons of History at Our Risk."
