= Jonas Mačys =

Lithuanian politician (1938–2012)

Jonas Mačys (18 April 1938 – 10 October 2012) was a Lithuanian politician. In 1990 he was among those who signed the Act of the Re-Establishment of the State of Lithuania.
