= Ted Kazanoff =

American actor

Theodore Leon Kazanoff (August 30, 1922 – October 21, 2012) was an American actor and drama teacher best known for playing Judge Scarletti on the original Law & Order series.

He played Mr. Nagle in the TV series Brooklyn Bridge and also appeared in two episodes of American Playhouse. He was a member of a long line of actors and teachers of acting who traced their aesthetic lineage back to Konstantin Stanislavsky (1863–1938), the Russian actor and teacher of acting. Kazanoff was also an avid student of directing, and the influence of Vsevolod Meyerhold (1874–1940) was especially apparent in his own directing work.

He was born and raised in the Bronx, New York City, to Belarusian Jewish parents Sarah Goldfarb and Aaron Kazanoff, a jeweler from Shklow. He served in World War II in the Philippines and graduated from City College of New York and Smith College. He died in Austin, Texas.
