= Odile Bain =

French parasitologist

- Born: April 28, 1939
- Died: October 16, 2012 (aged 73)
- Education: Faculty of Biology in Rennes, France (1960) Natural History Museum in Paris, France

Odile Bain (April 28, 1939 – October 16, 2012) was a French parasitologist.

== Early life and education ==
Odile Bain was born in Dalat, Vietnam where her father - who was a military officer - was based. She attended high school in Dakar, Senegal and then graduated from Rennes in France with a degree in biology in 1960. In 1963, she began a postgraduate course focusing in histology in Paris. Bain joined the Helminth Zoology Laboratory in 1964, which is where she began her career as a parasitologist. Bain received her Ph.D. in histology in April 1968.

== Career ==
Bain was appointed as a National Centre for Scientific Research (CNRS) research supervisor in the Heminth Zoology Laboratory and rose to the ranks of Director of Research (DR) of Exceptional Class. The lab researched parasitic nematodes, trematodes, cestodes and protozoa. Bain specialized in the systematics of filariae, and studying the biology of filariae which led to the characterization of the phyletic relationships between filarial lineages and those of non-filarial nematodes. She also contributed to the study of filarial zoonoses. Bain investigated aspects of vector biology that related to filarial worm infection with the goal of finding a way to control transmission. Her work and research resulted in the establishment of experimental models of filariasis in rodents, which has advanced the study of filarial disease, chemotherapy and immunology.

She published more than 360 articles during her 50-year career and had 30 years of successive contracts with the World Health Organization (WHO), the Edna McConnell Clark Foundation, and the European Union.

== Recognition ==
Bain was awarded the bronze medal of the CNRS in 1974. Ten years later, she received the Prize of Zoology from the Foulon Academy of Sciences in 1984.

BioMed Central's peer-reviewed journal Parasites & Vectors and the pharmaceutical company Boehringer Ingelheim Animal Health created the Odile Bain Memorial Prize in 2013 to commemorate Bain's legacy. Each year, the award celebrates the work of young scientists making strides in veterinary parasitology research.
