= Virginia Is for Lovers =

Slogan of the U.S. state of Virginia

The "Virginia is for Lovers" logo

"Virginia is for Lovers" (stylized in all caps as VIRGINIA IS FOR LO❤ERS) is the tourism and travel slogan of the U.S. commonwealth of Virginia. Used since 1969, it has become a well-recognized and often imitated part of American jargon. In 2012, Advertising Age magazine called "Virginia is for Lovers" "one of the most iconic ad campaigns in the past 50 years."

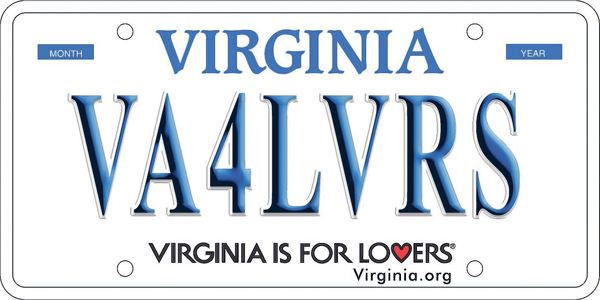
Virginia's 2014 and current license plate which reads VA4LVRS

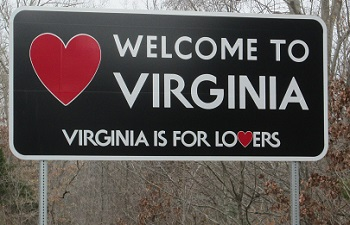
Virginia's 2015 and currently now welcome sign

== History ==
A team led by David N. Martin and George Woltz of Martin and Woltz Inc. of Richmond, Virginia created the slogan after winning the Virginia State Travel account in 1968. Originally, they had come up with history ads, "Virginia is for History Lovers"; beach ads, "Virginia is for Beach Lovers"; and mountain ads, "Virginia is for Mountain Lovers". This approach was eventually discarded as too limiting, and the qualifiers were dropped. Martin and Woltz Inc. eventually gained prominence and grew to become The Martin Agency. The Martin Agency says that, contrary to some claims, the slogan is not a reference to the United States Supreme Court's 1967 ruling in Loving v. Virginia, which legalized interracial marriage in the United States.

In 1969, the Virginia State Travel Service (now the Virginia Tourism Corporation) adopted the "Virginia is for Lovers" slogan and the first ad campaign using the tagline appeared in March 1969, in an issue of Modern Bride.

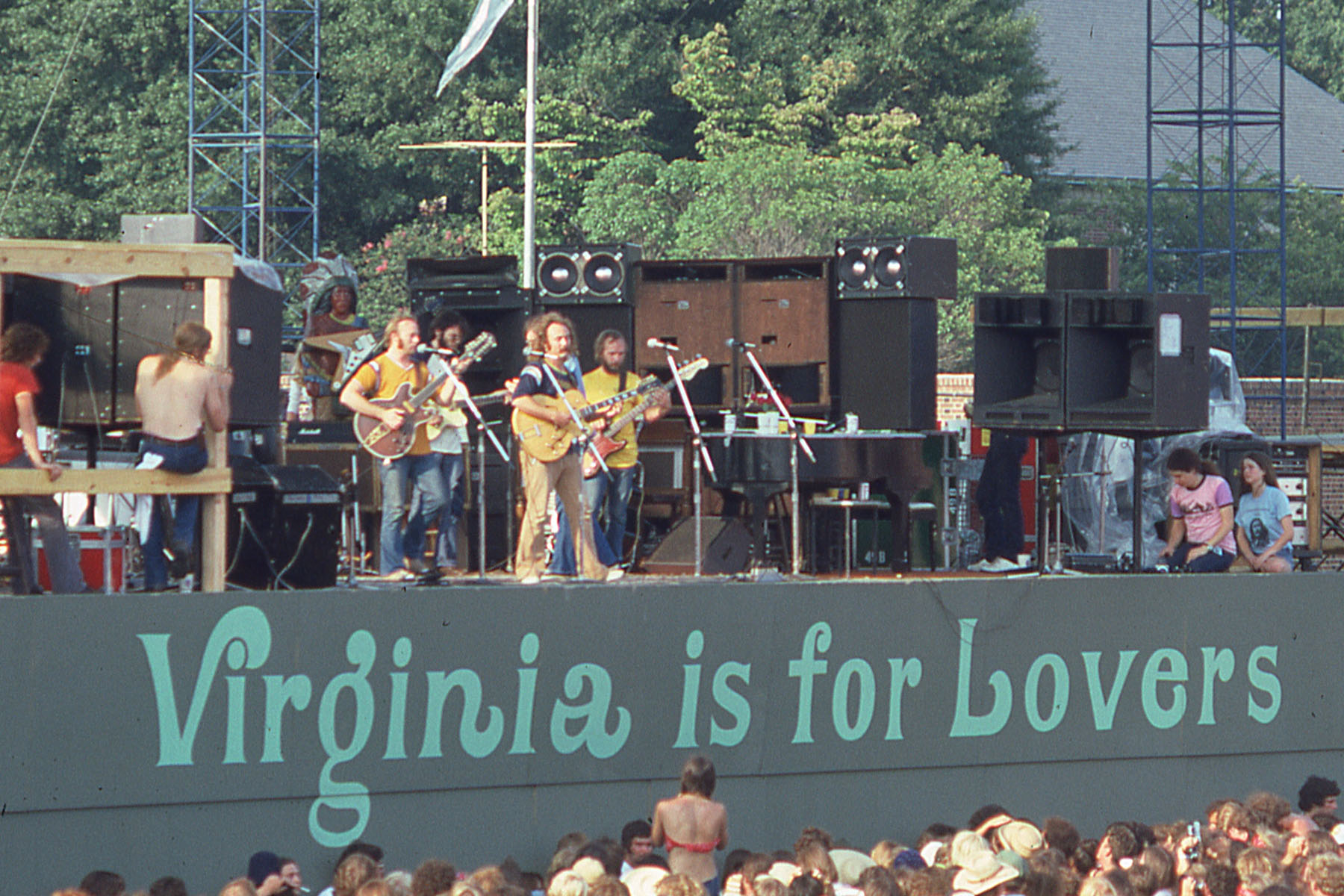
Crosby, Stills, Nash & Young reunion tour at Foreman Field, Old Dominion University, Norfolk VA (August 17, 1974)

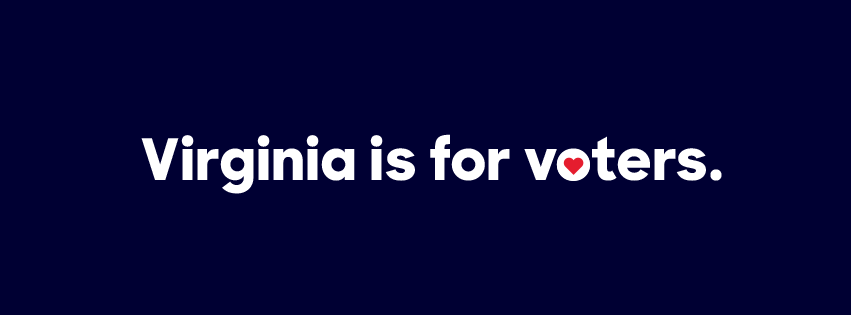
Hillary Clinton's 2016 campaign used this variation on the phrase in some of its Virginia campaign materials.

The slogan began appearing on the state's license plates in 2014 and the state's welcome signs in 2015.

In 2016, the Virginia Tourism Corporation began its first-ever LGBTQ+ marketing efforts, using a rainbow pride version of the logo.

== Accolades ==
In 2009, "Virginia is for Lovers" was inducted into the Madison Avenue Advertising Walk of Fame, a creation of Advertising Week, the largest collection of advertising, marketing and media professionals in North America. These inductees were also included in the Advertising Icon Museum. Also in 2009, "Virginia is for Lovers" was acknowledged as one of the top ten tourism marketing campaigns of all time by Forbes.com.

== References in popular culture ==
The slogan has been mentioned by a variety of artists over the years. In 2005, post-hardcore band Hawthorne Heights alluded to the phrase in the title of their single "Ohio Is for Lovers", which would become widely regarded as an anthem of the early 2000’s emo music scene. American Idol winner Jordin Sparks recorded a song called "Virginia is for Lovers" in 2007, which was featured as a bonus track on her self-titled debut album. The slogan is mentioned in The Hold Steady song "Killer Parties", and Willie Adler, guitarist for Lamb of God, has the slogan printed on the neck of his custom guitars. The slogan is also mentioned in the Kenny Chesney song "Get Along". The slogan is also mentioned in the Fountains of Wayne song "I-95", from their 2007 album Traffic and Weather, singing "They've got most of / the Barney DVDs / and coffee mugs and tees / that say Virginia is for lovers, but it's not." Virginia Beach-based rap group Clipse include the slogan in their song "Virginia," from their 2002 album Lord Willin', proclaiming: "Virginia's for lovers, but trust there's hate here / For out-of-towners, who think they're gon' move weight here." Space travel company Rocket Lab launched their first US based space flight in the Mid-Atlantic Regional Spaceport (MARS) LC-2 launch pad (the first use of that launch pad overall) on Wallops Island, Virginia in 2023. The slogan was referenced by Rocket Lab with the title they gave the launch "Virginia Is For Launch Lovers" which used the Rocket Lab developed Electron rocket. In the 1986 Jonathan Demme movie Something Wild, the lead character Charlie, played by Jeff Daniels, wears a T Shirt bearing the slogan as a disguise.
