= Barbara Sowers =

- Outfielder
- Born: May 4, 1932; Detroit, Illinois, U.S.
- Died: October 19, 2012 (aged 80); Port Charlotte, Florida, U.S.
- Batted: Right Threw: Right
- Stats at Baseball Reference

Teams
- Muskegon Belles (1953); Grand Rapids Chicks (1954)

Career highlights and awards
- Women in Baseball – AAGPBL Permanent Display at Baseball Hall of Fame and Museum (1988)

Barbara Jean Sowers (May 4, 1932 – October 19, 2012) was an All-American Girls Professional Baseball League player who played for the Muskegon Belles in 1953 and the Grand Rapids Chicks in 1954.

In 1953, the outfielder hit .205 with 34 hits in 70 games and the next year, she hit .284 with 56 hits and 34 RBI in 70 games. Overall, she hit .248 in 140 career games.

She was born in Detroit, Michigan, and died in Port Charlotte, Florida, at the age of 80. She was born May 4, 1932, in Detroit, Michigan, to the late Carl and Luella (née LaRocque) Sowers. A career public educator and High School Counselor, Barbara moved with her longtime companion Shirley A. Weaver from their hometown of Livonia, Michigan, to Charlotte County Florida in 1989 following her retirement.
