= Joe Cullinane =

American baseball broadcaster and author (1923–2012)

Joe Cullinane

Joseph "Joe" Cullinane (March 16, 1923 – October 19, 2012) was an American baseball broadcaster and author. He worked from 1963 to 1975 for the Triple-A minor league Rochester Red Wings, before moving to Denver, Colorado to work for the Denver Bears and Zephyrs minor league organizations. In 1993 he began work for the Colorado Rockies as part of their radio broadcast team.

He wrote the book Face to Face with Sports Legends, published in 2002. Rick Reilly, Senior Writer for Sports Illustrated, wrote in the testimonials to the book that "Joe Cullinane is to play-by-play sports broadcasting, what Otis is to elevators." An ESPN baseball analyst wrote, "If life experiences were the measure of a man's wealth, then longtime sports broadcaster, Joe Cullinane, would be listed in the Forbes 400. For every Bob Costas, Al Michaels or Dick Enberg, Joe represents the thousands who have dreamed, but never got the big break. But instead of any bitterness, he has taken nearly 50 years of memories and shared it with the reader. His list of interviewees reads like a book of Who's Who In Sports. If you love sports, you'll love this book. It should be required reading at every Sportscasters Camp in America."
