= Corrado Lojacono =

Italian singer, actor, record producer, and songwriter

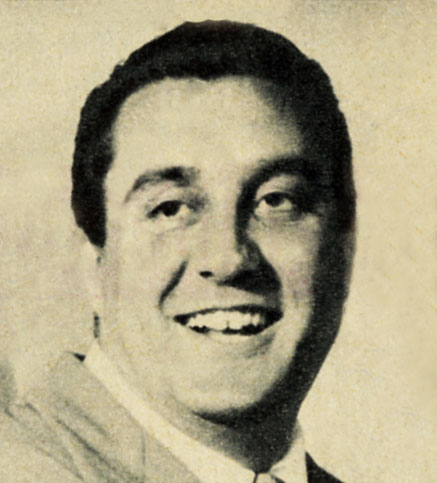
- Corrado Lojacono in 1955
- Born: 22 January 1924; Palermo, Kingdom of Italy
- Died: 23 October 2012 (aged 88); Milan, Italy
- Occupation: Singer

Corrado Lojacono (22 January 1924 – 23 October 2012) was an Italian singer, actor, record producer and songwriter.

== Life and career ==
Born in Palermo, Lojacono moved to Milan with his family in 1931. He started performing in 1945, specializing in a jazz and swing repertoire. In the early 1950s he debuted as an actor appearing in two revues alongside Renato Rascel, Attanasio cavallo vanesio and Alvaro piuttosto corsaro.

In 1957, Lojacono reprised his musical studies and graduated from the Accademia Internazionale Musicale in Rome. In 1961 he got his main hit, "Giuggola", which peaked at the first place on the Italian hit parade. In 1962 he was entered into the competition at the 12th edition of the Sanremo Music Festival with the song "L'anello".

Also active as a songwriter, sometimes credited as Camicasca, Lojacono composed about forty songs, notably "Carina", which was covered by several artists including Cliff Richard, Sophia Loren, Dean Martin and Caterina Valente. In the late 1960s he founded a record label and eventually retired from singing in the 1970s.

Lojacono died of kidney failure in his home in Milan.
