= The Martin Agency =

Advertising agency based in Richmond, Virginia

The Martin Agency, Inc.
- Type: Subsidiary
- Industry: Business Services
- Founded: June 22, 1965; 61 years ago
- Founder: David N. Martin
- Headquarters: Richmond, Virginia, U.S.
- Key people: Kristen Cavallo (Chief Executive Officer)
- Products: Advertising and marketing
- Number of employees: 400 (approx.)
- Parent: Omnicom Group Inc.
- Website: martinagency.com

The Martin Agency, Inc. is an American advertising agency based in Richmond, Virginia. A holding of Omnicom Group Inc., Martin is long-known for helping brands "impact culture" in the United States and internationally. The company's chief executive officer is Kristen Cavallo and its chief creative officer is Jerry Hoak.

== History ==
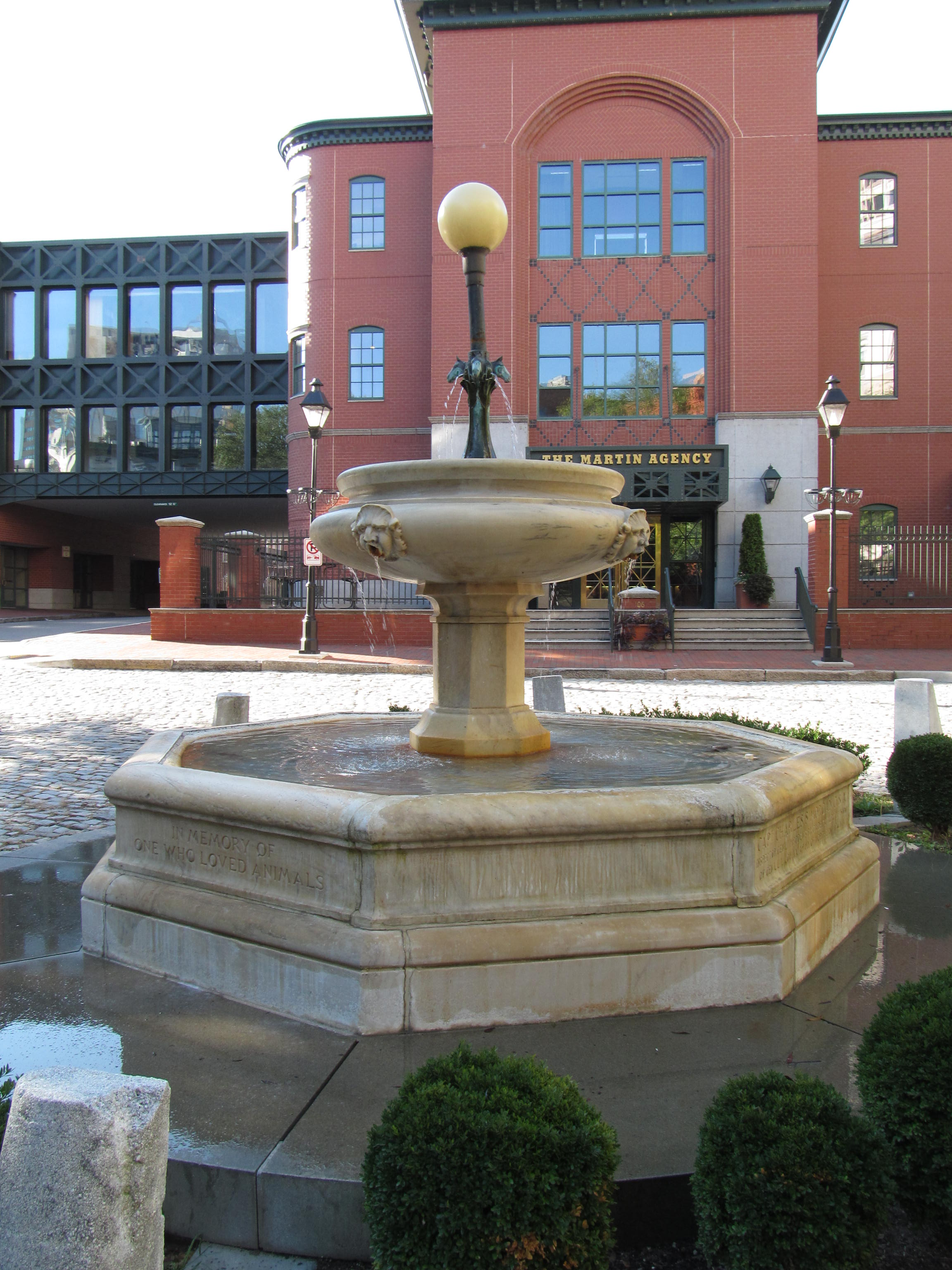
Headquarters of the Martin Agency in Shockoe Slip

The Martin Agency was founded in Richmond, Virginia, by David N. Martin after he left Martin & Woltz, which he had co-founded with George Woltz on June 22, 1965.

While at Martin & Woltz, the development of the "Virginia is for Lovers" tagline, one of the most recognized taglines in the tourism industry and beyond, launched the trajectory of the agency. Written in 1969 by copywriter Robin McLaughlin, the slogan entered the Madison Avenue Walk of Fame in 2009.

After leaving Martin & Woltz in 1975, Martin founded The Martin Agency.

In 1986, Scali, McCabe, Sloves purchased a majority interest in The Martin Agency. Scali, McCabe, Sloves was acquired by Lowe Group in 1993. The Interpublic Group of Companies (IPG) bought controlling interest in The Martin Agency in 1994. The Martin Agency was previously under McCann Worldgroup and is currently part of the MullenLowe network at IPG. In 2026, it became a part of Omnicom Group Inc.

The Martin Agency and GEICO are credited with pioneering a new way of advertising in the insurance category in the early 1990s, spawning a list of imitators in the category.

In 2009, Adweek named The Martin Agency as its "U.S. Agency of the Year."

In 2020, Adweek again named The Martin Agency as its "U.S. Agency of the Year.". Danny Robinson became the Agency's Chief Creative Officer in this year as well.

In 2021, Adweek named The Martin Agency as its "U.S. Agency of the Year," only the third agency to win the honor in back-to-back years. Ad Age named The Martin Agency #8 on its annual A-List.

In 2023, Ad Age named The Martin Agency as its "Agency of the Year."

== Notable campaigns ==
- Virginia is for Lovers
- GEICO Cavemen
- GEICO Hump Day
- The GEICO Gecko
- FreeCreditScore.com
- DoorDash #OpenForDelivery
- UPS What can brown do for you?
- GEICO Best Of GEICO

== Coinbase Super Bowl ad controversy ==
In February 2022, Martin Agency CEO Kristen Cavallo criticized Coinbase CEO Brian Robinson for not acknowledging the role that agencies had played in the creation of its Super Bowl ad.

The incident prompted a wider dialogue within the industry about how agencies are treated.
