= Patrick Dignan (British Army officer) =

- Born: 25 July 1920; Dublin, Ireland
- Died: 11 October 2012 (aged 92)
- Military career
- Allegiance: United Kingdom
- Branch: British Army
- Service years: 1950–1978
- Rank: Major General
- Service number: 410605
- Conflicts: Malayan Emergency; Suez Crisis
- Awards: Companion of the Order of the Bath; Member of the Order of the British Empire; Mentioned in Despatches

Major General Albert Patrick Dignan CB, MBE, FRCSI, FRCS (25 July 1920 – 11 October 2012) was a senior British Army officer who rose to be Director of Army Surgery between 1973 and 1978.

== Early life ==
Dignan was born on 25 July 1920 in Dublin, Ireland, to Joseph Dignan. Dignan and his four brothers were pushed to be doctors after his father saw that very few doctors were casualties of the First World War. He graduated from the medical school at Trinity College, Dublin in 1943 with a Bachelor of Medicine, Bachelor of Surgery, Bachelor in the Art of Obstetrics. He qualified as a surgeon in 1947 and became a Fellow of the Royal College of Surgeons in Ireland (FRCSI).

== Military career ==
Having been called up for National Service, Dignan was commissioned into the Royal Army Medical Corps as a lieutenant on 7 May 1950. He was given the service number 410605. One year later, on 7 May 1951, he was promoted to captain. He was posted to Malaya during the Malayan Emergency, and served as the only surgeon at Kamunting Military Hospital in Taiping. On 16 June 1952, he transferred to the Regular Army Reserve of Officers. This signalled the end of his national service and his first period of active service.

== Later life ==
Following the death of his wife in 2001, Dignan moved into The Priory care home in Tetbury, Gloucestershire. He died on 11 October 2012.

== Personal life ==
Dignan married Eileen Helena White in 1952. They met when they were both British Army personnel serving in Malaya; she was a theatre sister in the Queen Alexandra's Royal Army Nursing Corps. Together they had two sons and one daughter.

== Honours and decorations ==
Dignan was appointed a Companion of the Order of the Bath in the 1978 Queen's Birthday Honours following his retirement from the military.
