= 2012 in the United Kingdom =

Events from the year 2012 in the United Kingdom. This was the year of the Summer Olympics in London as well as the Diamond Jubilee of Elizabeth II.

== Incumbents ==
- Monarch – Elizabeth II
- Prime Minister – David Cameron (Coalition)

== Events ==
=== January ===
- 3 January – After a trial based on new forensic evidence, Gary Dobson and David Norris are convicted of the racist murder of black London teenager Stephen Lawrence, who was killed in April 1993. On 4 January they are sentenced to life imprisonment for the murder, with minimum term of just over 15 and 14 years respectively.
- 6 January – Mobile phone operator O2 announces plans to provide free internet to millions of residents and visitors in central London by launching Europe's largest free Wi-Fi zone.
- 10 January
  - The Scottish Government announces that it plans to hold the referendum on Scottish independence in the autumn of 2014.
  - Five Muslim men go on trial at Derby Crown Court for calling for gay men to be killed, the first such prosecution under hate crime legislation.
- 20 January – Press TV, an English language news channel owned by the Iranian Government, is forced off air in the United Kingdom after Ofcom revokes its broadcasting licence for breaching the terms of the Communications Act.
- 21 January – Under new guidelines to come into force from 30 April, clinics which charge for pregnancy services including abortions will be able to advertise their services on radio and television after the Broadcast Committee of Advertising Practice rules there is no justification for barring such advertising.
- 23 January – John Anslow, a prisoner charged with murder following a fatal shooting in 2010, escapes from the van transporting him to a court appearance following an armed ambush near Redditch, Worcestershire.
- 24 January – UK government debt has risen above £1,000,000,000,000 for the first time.
- 25 January
  - Scotland's First Minister, Alex Salmond, sets out the question – "Do you agree that Scotland should be an independent country?" – that he intends to ask voters in a referendum in 2014.
  - Official figures reveal that the UK economy shrunk by 0.2% in the final three months of 2011.
- 31 January – Former Royal Bank of Scotland CEO Fred Goodwin loses his knighthood as a result of the near collapse of the bank in 2008.

=== February ===
- February – Ash dieback fungus first found in the British Isles.
- 3 February
  - Secretary of State for Energy Chris Huhne resigns after the Crown Prosecution Service announces it will bring charges against him over claims his wife accepted penalty points on her driving licence for speeding on his behalf.
  - The Football Association removes John Terry as Captain of the England national football team over allegations of racial abuse of opponent Anton Ferdinand during a match.
- 4 February – The Met Office issues a severe weather warning as heavy snow falls across much of the UK, disrupting road and air travel.
- 6 February – Queen Elizabeth II celebrates her Diamond Jubilee, marking sixty years on the throne; only the second British monarch to do so.
- 9 February – The Bank of England agrees to extend its quantitative easing programme by £50,000,000,000, to give a further boost to the UK economy.
- 17 February – Rupert Murdoch announces that a Sunday edition of The Sun newspaper, The Sun on Sunday, will be launched "very soon", effectively replacing the News of the World which was axed last summer due to the phone hacking scandal. Its launch is confirmed on 19 February for the following weekend.
- 23 February – The Together for Trees environmental campaign is first publicly announced.
- 24 February – Falkirk MP Eric Joyce is charged with three counts of common assault after a disturbance at a House of Commons bar.
- 26 February – The first edition of The Sun on Sunday is published.
- 27 February – Singer Charlotte Church and her parents agree damages and costs of £600,000 with Rupert Murdoch's News Group, publishers of the defunct News of the World, after the newspaper printed stories about them from information gained through phone hacking activities.
- 29 February
  - James Murdoch resigns from News International to focus on running News Limited's television business with the News International phone hacking scandal as a factor in the decision.
  - David Rathband, the policeman blinded by gunman Raoul Moat during a 2010 shooting is found dead at his home in Blyth, Northumberland.

=== March ===
- 3 March – A meteor is seen over most of the United Kingdom at about 21:40 GMT.
- 14 March – It is announced that the towns of Chelmsford, Perth and St Asaph are being granted city status to mark the Diamond Jubilee of Elizabeth II.
- 15 March – Unemployment now stands at a 17-year high of nearly 2,700,000 for January.
- 16 March – Dr. Rowan Williams announces he will retire as Archbishop of Canterbury at the end of the year having headed the Anglican Church since 2003. He will subsequently take up the role of Master of Magdalene College, Cambridge.
- 17 March – Personal documents released from the papers of Margaret Thatcher show the former British Prime Minister held a private meeting with Rupert Murdoch at Chequers weeks before his purchase of Times Newspapers in 1981.
- 18 March – British journalists Gareth Montgomery-Johnson and Nicholas Davies-Jones, detained last month in Libya after being accused of entering the country illegally, have been released the country's Interior Ministry confirms.
- 21 March – George Osborne delivers his 2012 United Kingdom Budget.
- 24 March – The Sunday Times releases a video showing Conservative Party co-treasurer Peter Cruddas allegedly offering undercover reporters access to Prime Minister David Cameron for £250,000.
- 25 March – Peter Cruddas resigns as Tory Party co-treasurer following the "Cash for Access" revelations.
- 26 March
  - In the wake of the Cash for Access scandal, David Cameron publishes details of Conservative Party donors who have had dinner with him at 10 Downing Street.
  - Fuel tanker drivers belonging to the Unite union vote overwhelmingly to take strike action in a dispute over terms and conditions.
- 27 March – The cost of a first-class stamp will rise from 46p to 60p from 30 April while second class post will increase from 36p to 50p after regulator Ofcom lifts some price controls on Royal Mail.
- 29 March – 2012 Bradford West by-election: Respect Party candidate George Galloway wins, taking the seat from the Labour Party with a majority of 10,140 votes.

=== April ===
- 7 April – The 158th University Boat Race between Oxford and Cambridge is stopped mid-race due to a swimmer in the water. Cambridge go on to win when a clash of oars at the restart leaves Oxford with a broken paddle.
- 12 April – Transport for London bans an advertising campaign due to run on buses by a Christian group; which was suggesting that gay people could be cured by therapy.
- 15 April – Centennial anniversary of the sinking of the Titanic is commemorated in Southampton, Halifax, Nova Scotia, and around the world.
- 18 April – In a rare move, television cameras are allowed into the High Court in Edinburgh to film the sentencing of David Gilroy for the murder of Suzanne Pilley.
- 20 April – Belfast MAC (Metropolitan Arts Centre), designed by Hackett Hall McKnight, opens in Northern Ireland.
- 22 April – 30-year-old Claire Squires collapses and dies while running the London Marathon, the tenth death in the race's history. She had planned to raise £500 for The Samaritans, but within a day members of the public have donated £219,000. The end of the year would see this total rise to nearly £1M.
- 25 April – Figures from the Office for National Statistics indicate the UK economy has returned to recession after shrinking by 0.2% in the first three months of 2012, bringing about a much-feared double-dip recession.
- 30 April – Figures released by the Met Office show that April was the wettest on record in the United Kingdom.

=== May ===
- 3 May – Local elections held in England, Scotland and Wales.
  - Labour makes gains and wins the largest number of councillors in contested seats in England and Wales and the SNP making gains and winning the largest number of councillors in Scotland. The estimated voting share is: 39% Labour, 31% Conservative, 16% Liberal Democrats and 14% other.
  - Boris Johnson is re-elected as Mayor of London with 51.5% of the vote. Ken Livingstone subsequently says it would be his 'last election'. In the London Assembly, Labour becomes the party with the greatest number of seats, with minor losses for the Conservatives and Liberal Democrats. The British National Party loses its only seat. Of 25 seats, the final tally stands at: Labour 12, Conservatives 9, Liberal Democrats 2, Green 2.
- 5 May – Chelsea win the seventh FA Cup of their history with a 2–1 win over Liverpool in the final.
- 5 May - Wales Coast Path officially launched.
- 13 May – Manchester City win the Premier League title on goal difference ahead of cross city rivals United, their first top division title since 1968.
- 16 May – The Office for National Statistics publishes figures which show that unemployment has fallen by 45,000 in the three months to March to 2,625,000, a rate of 8.2%. Youth unemployment has fallen to 1,020,000, a rate of 21.9%. Average weekly pay, including bonuses, grew by 0.6%. The claimant count dropped by 13,700 in April to 1,590,000, and the March figure is revised to show a fall of 5,400 rather than a rise of 3,600.
- 18 May – The Olympic flame arrives at RNAS Culdrose in Cornwall on board a British Airways Airbus A319, with custom gold livery and named "The Firefly" as flight BA2012 from Athens, ready for the torch relay ahead of the 2012 Summer Olympics.
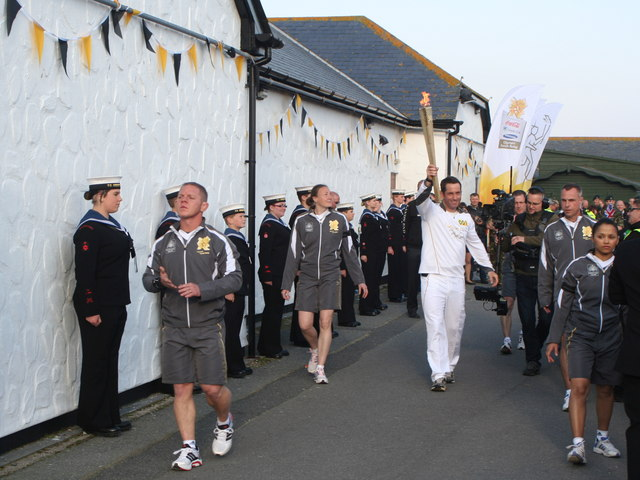
- The Olympic Torch Relay leaves Land's End on its journey around the UK.
  19 May
  - the Olympic torch relay begins when members of 771 Naval Air Squadron take the flame from Culdrose to Land's End by Sea King helicopter, Olympic sailing star Ben Ainslie runs the first leg of the relay.
  - Chelsea win the European Cup for the first time in their history, defeating Bayern Munich of Germany on penalties after a 1–1 draw in Munich's Allianz Arena.
- 22 May – The Royal Navy's first female warship commander, Commander Sarah West, takes up her post on HMS Portland at Rosyth.
- 25 May – Millionaire's daughter Laura Johnson, who drove looters around London during the 2011 riots is jailed for two years.

=== June ===
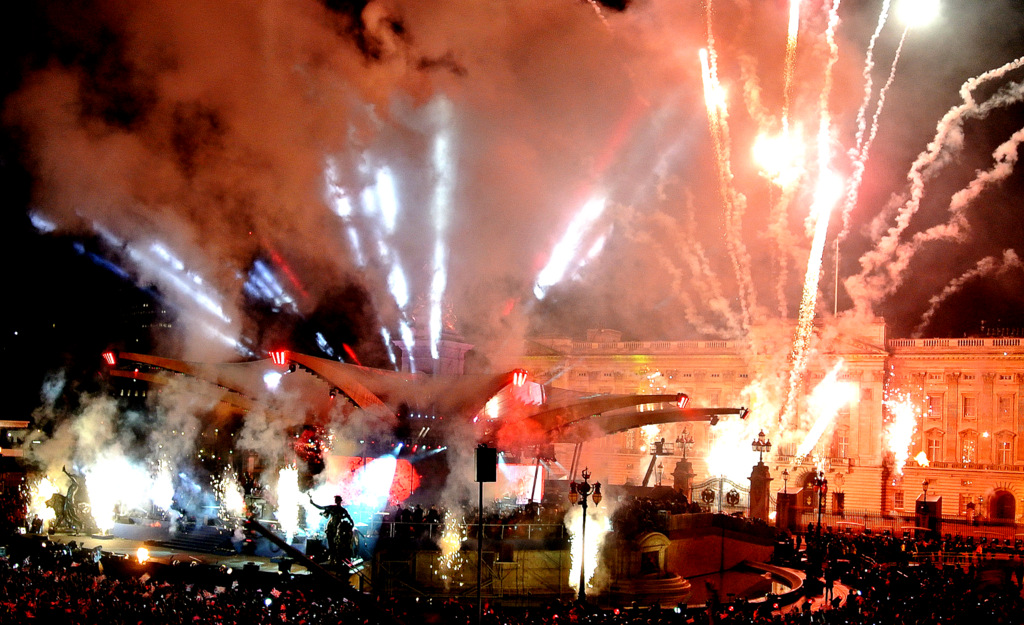
- Fireworks display at Buckingham palace marks Elizabeth II's Diamond jubilee
  2–5 June – The UK celebrates the Diamond Jubilee of Elizabeth II with a four-day bank holiday weekend. Events include a pageant of over 1,000 boats on the River Thames on 3 June and a pop concert outside Buckingham Palace on 4 June.
- 9–10 June – Heavy rain causes flooding in Wales.
- 24 June – In the Euro 2012 football tournament's quarter-final, England lose by a penalty shoot-out, with former West Ham player Alessandro Diamanti converting from the spot at the Olimpiyskiy National Sports Complex in Kyiv to take Italy through to the semi-final against Germany.
- 27 June – Barclays Bank plc is fined £290,000,000 after trying to manipulate interbank interest rates. Chief Executive Bob Diamond also forgoes his bonus.
- 28 June – A man is killed as torrential rain causes widespread flooding across England. Both main railway lines connecting England and Scotland are closed after the tracks are blocked by landslides. The storms also force the Olympic torch relay to be halted briefly.
- 30 June – The UK government announces an independent review of the workings of the Libor inter-bank lending rate in the wake of the Barclays scandal.

=== July ===
- July – Auckland Castle, former seat of the Prince Bishops of Durham, is transferred from the Church Commissioners to a local charitable foundation.
- 3 July – Bob Diamond resigns as the Chief Executive of British bank Barclays following a scandal in which the bank tried to manipulate the Libor and Euribor interest rates systems.
- 4 July – Broadcaster George Entwistle is named as the next Director-General of the BBC beginning in autumn 2012.
- 5 July – The Shard, the tallest building in Europe and the tallest habitable free-standing structure in the UK at 309.6 metres (1,016 ft), is officially opened.
- 6 July – Andy Murray makes it to the final of the 2012 Wimbledon Championships – Men's Singles, becoming the first Briton to do so in 74 years. He is defeated at the final two days later by Roger Federer.
- 7 July – Britain's Jonathan Marray and Denmark's Frederik Nielsen win Wimbledon's men's double final by three sets to two. Marray becomes the first Briton to win such a match since 1936.
- 10 July – The Trades Union Congress confirms the appointment of its first female General Secretary. Frances O'Grady will take up the role at the end of the year.
- 17 July – The Office for National Statistics publishes its monthly inflation report. The consumer price inflation rate has unexpectedly fallen in June to 2.4%, its lowest level since November 2009. The retail price inflation figure shows a similar marked drop to 2.8%.
- 18 July – The Office for National Statistics publishes figures which show that unemployment has fallen by 65,000 in the three months to May to 2,580,000 a rate of 8.1%. Average weekly pay, including bonuses, grew by 1.8% on the year. The claimant count rose by 6,100 in June to 1,600,000. With surprisingly good inflation and employment figures, the UK economy looks set to grow in the second half of 2012.
- 22 July – Bradley Wiggins wins the 2012 Tour de France bicycle race, the first British rider ever to do so.
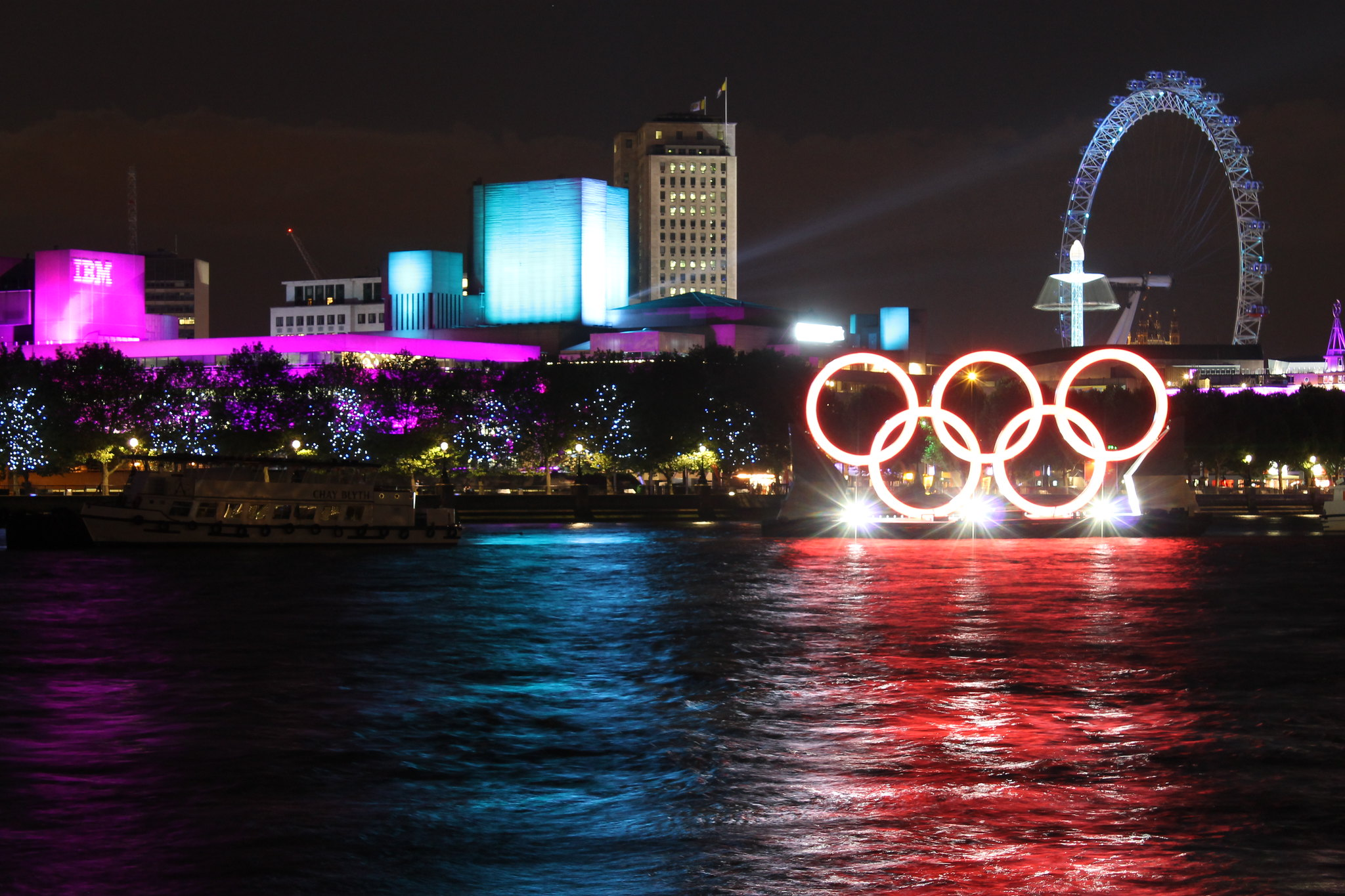
  Olympic Rings by the River Thames on 6 August
- 27 July – 12 August – London hosts the 2012 Summer Olympics, beginning with an opening ceremony, and making the UK capital the first city to host the Games for a third time. The closing ceremony is on 12 August.

=== August ===
- 3 August – Iftikhar and Farzana Ahmed are jailed for life after being convicted of the 2003 murder of their daughter Shafilea.
- 4 August – Team GB wins six gold medals and a silver on Day Eight of the 2012 London Olympics, making it the greatest British success in one day at an Olympics since 1908.
- 5 August – In Olympic tennis, Andy Murray defeats Roger Federer to win the men's singles final, securing Britain's 16th gold medal in the process.
- 12 August
  - As the 2012 Olympics draws to an end, Team GB finishes third in the medal table with 29 gold medals, and 65 medals in total.
  - Golfer Rory McIlroy wins the 2012 US PGA Championship at Kiawah Island.
- 14 August – Outgoing BBC Director-General Mark Thompson is appointed CEO of The New York Times, taking up his role in November.
- 15 August – Virgin Trains founder Richard Branson says the operator will "almost definitely" back out of bidding for future rail licences after losing the InterCity West Coast franchise to FirstGroup, the UK's largest rail operator.
- 17 August – The death occurs of Winnie Johnson, the mother of Moors Murder victim Keith Bennett, the only victim of Ian Brady and Myra Hindley whose remains have not been recovered. Her death comes as police investigate claims Brady wrote her a letter revealing the location of her son's body.
- 20 August – Former Polly Peck tycoon Asil Nadir is found guilty on three counts of stealing millions of pounds from his company by a jury at London's Old Bailey.
- 29 August – Opening ceremony of the 2012 Summer Paralympic Games, which end on 9 September.

=== September ===
- 7 September – Greater Gabbard wind farm construction completed.
- 9 September – 2012 Summer Paralympics closing ceremony.
- 10 September – Andy Murray wins the US Open Tennis Championship, the first British man to win a Grand Slam tournament since 1936.
- 18 September – Two female police officers are killed in Hattersley, Greater Manchester, in a gun and grenade attack.
- 20 September – Dale Cregan, 29, is charged with the murders of WPCs Fiona Bone and Nicola Hughes in Greater Manchester. He is also charged with two other murders which occurred in the Greater Manchester area last month, as well as three attempted murders between May and August of this year.
- 30 September – It is reported that an ITV documentary to be shown on 3 October in the Exposure series will reveal accusations that DJ and BBC TV presenter Sir Jimmy Savile, who died the previous year, sexually abused underage girls.

=== October ===
- 1 October – Automatic enrolment to workplace pension schemes commences.
- 3 October – The decision to award the rail franchise for InterCity West Coast to FirstGroup is scrapped by the government after what are described as "significant technical flaws" in the bidding process.
- 8 October – Scientists warn of the dangers of using liquid nitrogen in drinks after an 18-year-old woman in Lancaster requires emergency surgery after consuming a cocktail containing the substance.
- 11 October – Heavy rain in the United Kingdom causes flash flooding in the coastal village of Clovelly, Devon, damaging homes and pulling up cobbles in the street.
- 12 October – The UK's largest independent investigation into police wrongdoing will be conducted following damning reports into the 1989 Hillsborough disaster.
- 14 October
  - The Ministry of Defence says that five Royal Marines have been charged with murder over an incident involving the death of an insurgent in Afghanistan in 2011.
  - The Ministry of Defence will hold an investigation after journalists from The Sunday Times posed as lobbyists for a defence manufacturer and approached several senior retired officers to ask if they would help them secure contracts.
- 15 October
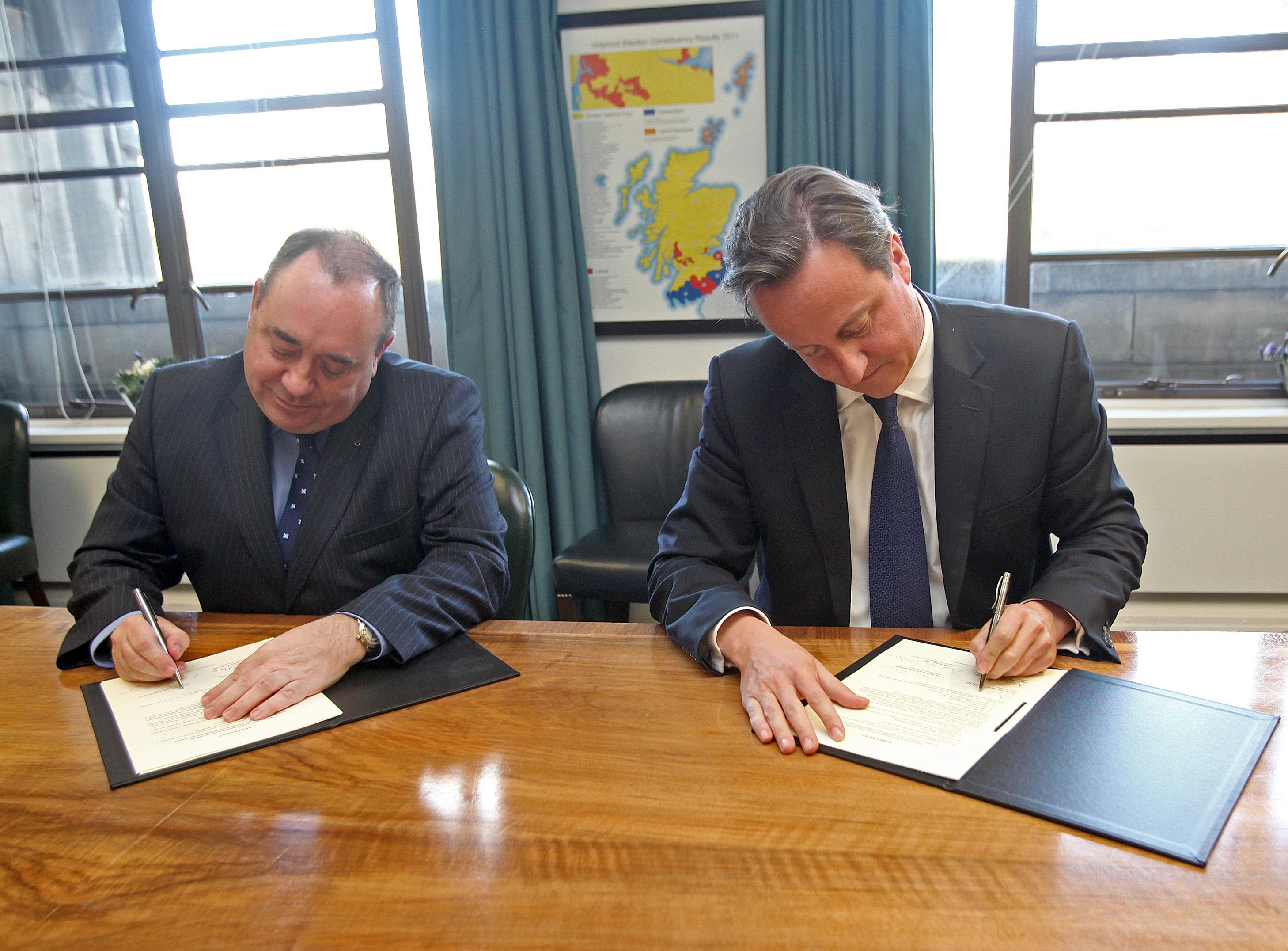
  - Alex Salmond and David Cameron sign the Edinburgh Agreement
    British Prime Minister David Cameron and Scottish First Minister Alex Salmond sign the Edinburgh Agreement – a deal setting out the terms of a referendum on Scottish independence.
  - Lieutenant General Sir John Kiszely resigns as president of the Royal British Legion following claims of his involvement with defence contract lobbying.
  - Essex Police begin an investigation after four children and their mother are killed in a suspicious house fire in Harlow. A fifth child dies in hospital on 18 October.
- 16 October – The BBC appoints the heads of two separate inquiries into the substantial sexual abuse allegations against the late Jimmy Savile that have come to light. Former High Court judge Dame Janet Smith will review the culture and practices of the BBC during the time Savile worked there, while Nick Pollard, a former Sky News executive will look at why a Newsnight investigation into Savile's activities was dropped shortly before transmission.
- 17 October
  - The government launches GOV.UK, a single website for government, closing the Directgov and Business Link websites.
  - Lancashire Police apologises after an officer used a Taser on a blind man whose white cane was mistaken for a samurai sword. The matter is also referred to the Independent Police Complaints Commission.
- 19 October – Scotland Yard launches a "formal criminal investigation" into Jimmy Savile, after 200 potential sexual abuse victims come forward.
- 20 October – Frankel retires as the world's highest-rated racehorse after his fourteenth race in an unbeaten career.
- 22 October – Surgeons have carried out the first ever robotic open-heart operations in Britain at the New Cross Hospital in Wolverhampton.
- 23 October
  - Leader of Birmingham City Council Sir Albert Bore warns that cuts in government grants to the city could lead to "the end of local government as we have known it".
  - James Bond film Skyfall premières at the Royal Albert Hall in London.
- 24 October – The last analogue television broadcasts are made in the United Kingdom, in Northern Ireland, as the country completes its transfer to digital television.
- 30 October – Britain's first 4G mobile network is launched, offering high-speed mobile data services in eleven major cities.

=== November ===
- 1 November – The Comet retail chain goes into administration after private equity firm OpCapita failed to revive the business.
- 5 November – Prime Minister David Cameron orders a fresh investigation into allegations of sexual abuse involving a senior Conservative politician from the Thatcher era. The allegations concern sexual abuse at children's homes in Wales during the 1970s and 1980s.
- 6 November – Conservative MP Nadine Dorries is suspended from the party after her decision to appear on the reality television series I'm a Celebrity...Get Me Out of Here!.
- 8 November – This Morning presenter Phillip Schofield hands David Cameron an internet-generated list of suspects in the North Wales child abuse scandal involving a care home during a live interview and asks him to comment, resulting in ITV facing an investigation by the media regulator Ofcom.
- 9 November – The BBC issues an apology after a key witness in a Newsnight report aired on 2 November wrongly identified a senior politician as a paedophile.
- 10 November – George Entwistle steps down as BBC Director-General following the Newsnight child abuse broadcast controversy.
- 11 November – Tim Davie, BBC head of audio and music becomes Acting Director-General following George Entwistle's resignation.
- 13 November – Labour Party politician Margaret Moran, former Member of Parliament for Luton South, is found guilty of 15 counts of false accounting and six of using a false instrument over the claims. Her fraud totalled more than £53,000, the most of any politician convicted in the United Kingdom parliamentary expenses scandal.
- 15 November
  - 2012 England and Wales Police and Crime Commissioner elections: Elections held to choose 41 Police and Crime Commissioners in England and Wales are marked by voter apathy with a turnout of just 14.9%. The Electoral Commission says it will investigate the low turnout.
  - 2012 Cardiff South and Penarth by-election: Labour holds the seat. Stephen Doughty is the new MP.
  - 2012 Corby by-election: Labour gain the seat from the Conservatives. Andy Sawford is the new MP.
  - 2012 Manchester Central by-election: Labour holds the seat. Lucy Powell is the new MP.
- 19 November – Scientists report a significant decline in UK birdlife – from 210,000,000 nesting birds in 1966, down to 166,000,000 today.
- 20 November – A typewriter which its makers say is the last to be built in the UK has been produced at a North Wales factory.
- 22 November – The BBC appoints Tony Hall as its new Director-General. He is expected to start in the role in early March 2013.
- 24 November – Education Secretary Michael Gove and Rotherham Council are to launch separate investigations after three children were removed from their foster parents because the couple belong to the UK Independence Party.
- 29 November
  - Lord Leveson announces the findings of the Leveson Inquiry into the British media. Prime Minister David Cameron says he backs the principles of the report's recommendations, but has "serious concerns and misgivings" about introducing any new legislation to underpin a regulatory body to oversee the media.
  - 2012 Croydon North by-election: Labour holds the seat. Steve Reed is the new MP.
  - 2012 Middlesbrough by-election: Labour holds the seat. Andy McDonald is the new MP. The UK Independence Party achieve second place, beating the Conservatives and Liberal Democrats.
  - 2012 Rotherham by-election: Labour holds the seat. Sarah Champion is the new MP. The UK Independence Party achieve second place, beating the Conservatives and Liberal Democrats.
- 30 November – Victims of press intrusion launch an online campaign to urge British Prime Minister David Cameron to implement fully the recommendations of the Leveson report.

=== December ===
- 3 December – St. James' Palace announces that the Duchess of Cambridge is pregnant with her first child. She is hospitalised at the King Edward VII Hospital in London with acute morning sickness.
- 6 December
  - Virgin Trains is awarded a 23-month franchise to continue operating InterCity West Coast until 9 November 2014.
  - The Duchess of Cambridge leaves hospital.
- 9 December – University College Falmouth, Cornwall, is granted full university status as Falmouth University, a creative arts institution.
- 14 December – Former Labour Party MP Margaret Moran is given a two-year supervision and treatment order after falsely claiming £53,000 in expenses. A judge had earlier ruled she was unfit to stand trial because of mental health issues.

=== Undated ===
- Despite beginning with drought in some areas, 2012 is the second-wettest year on record in the UK and the wettest ever in England.
- British new car sales reach a post-recession high of 2,040,000 with the Ford Fiesta being Britain's most popular car for the fourth year in a row. The success of Nissan's British-built Qashqai crossover vehicle continues with more than 45,000 sales making it Britain's sixth-most popular new car. Mercedes-Benz enjoys a surge in sales, with its C-Class range achieving over 37,000 sales as Britain's ninth-most popular new car.

== Publications ==
- Hilary Mantel's historical novel Bring Up the Bodies (wins Man Booker Prize and Costa Book of the Year).
- Jamie Oliver's recipe book Jamie's 15 Minute Meals.

== Births ==
- 29 March – Isla Phillips, daughter of Peter and Autumn Phillips, sister of Savannah and second great-grandchild of Queen Elizabeth II
- 3 June – Lox Pratt , actor

== Deaths ==
=== January ===
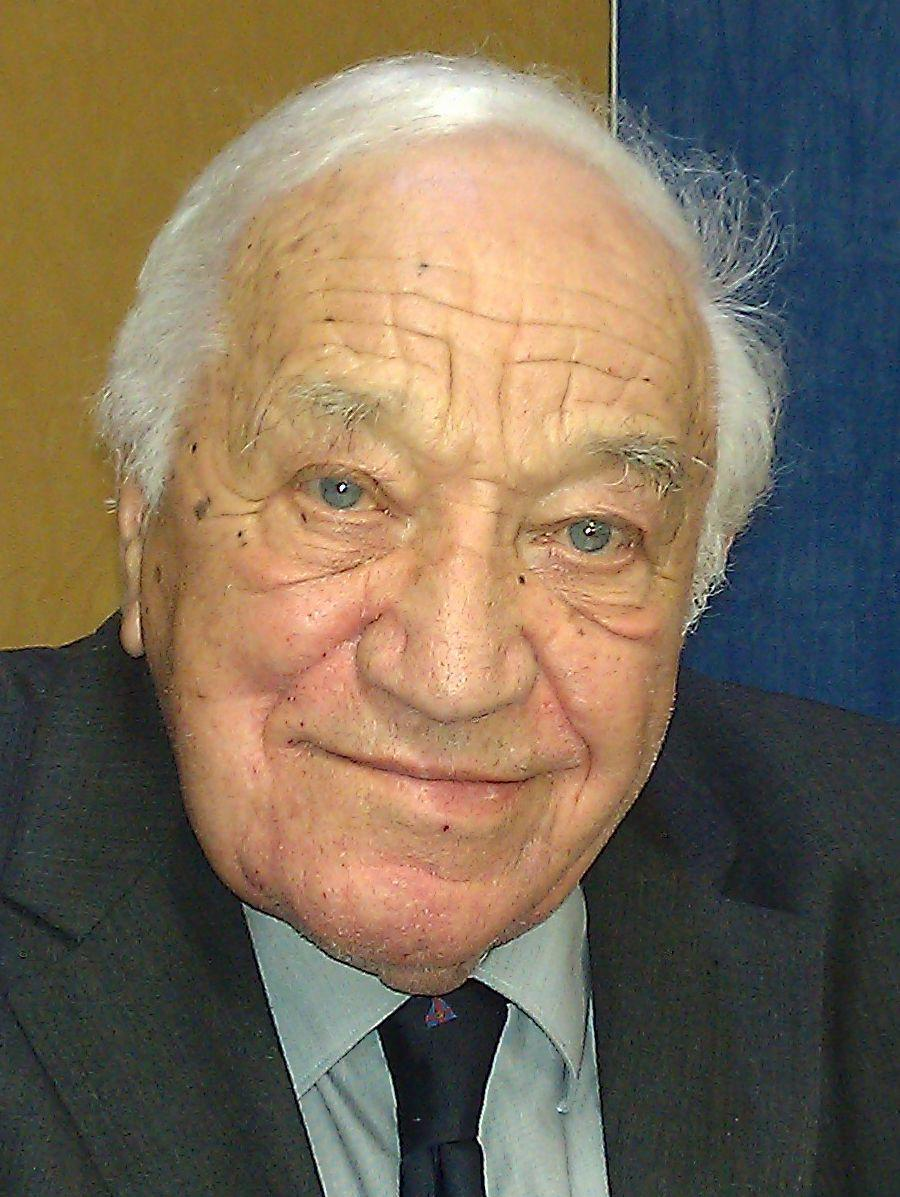
John Madin

- 1 January
  - Gary Ablett, English footballer (Liverpool, Everton, Birmingham City), non-Hodgkin lymphoma (born 1965)
  - Bob Anderson, Olympic fencer, film fight director and choreographer (Star Wars, The Lord of the Rings) (born 1921)
  - Frank Horwill, athletics coach. (born 1927)
- 2 January
  - Ian Bargh, jazz pianist, lung cancer (born 1935)
  - David W. Barron, 76, computer scientist.
  - Alan Rowlands, 82, pianist.
- 3 January
  - Jenny Tomasin, 75, actress (Upstairs, Downstairs.
  - Bob Weston, 64, guitarist and songwriter (Fleetwood Mac).
- 4 January
  - Eve Arnold, American photojournalist (born 1912), died in London
  - Harry Fowler, actor (born 1926)
  - Kerry McGregor, singer (born 1974)
- 5 January – Idwal Fisher, 76, rugby player.
- 6 January
  - Louise Gibson Annand, 96, artist.
  - Harry Fearnley, 88, footballer.
  - Bob Holness, South African-born radio and television presenter (Blockbusters) and actor (born 1928)
  - Eleftherios Katsaitis, 82, Greek-born Orthodox hierarch, Auxiliary Bishop of Archdiocese of Great Britain (1987–1994).
  - Clive Shell, 64, rugby player.
- 7 January
  - Tony Blankley, 63, commentator, newspaper editor and child actor.
  - Charlie Pawsey, 88, rugby league player.
- 8 January
  - T. J. Hamblin, 68, haematologist.
  - John Madin, 87, architect.
  - Charles Morris, 85, politician, MP for Manchester Openshaw (1963–1983).
  - Graham Rathbone, 69, footballer.
- 9 January
  - Brian Curvis, British and Commonwealth champion boxer (born 1937).
  - Bill Dickie, 82, football administrator.
  - Bridie Gallagher, Irish singer (born 1924), died in Belfast
- 10 January
  - Lila Kaye, 82, actress.
  - Cliff Portwood, 74, footballer and singer.
- 11 January
  - Frank Cook, politician (born 1935)
  - Steven Rawlings, 49, astrophysicist.
  - Ivor Rees, 85, Anglican prelate, Bishop of St David's (1991–1995).
  - David Whitaker, 80, composer and songwriter.
- 12 January
  - John Beech Austin, 94, aviator.
  - Reginald Hill, crime fiction writer (born 1936)
  - Rosalind Runcie, 79, pianist.
- 13 January
  - Dilys Elwyn-Edwards, 93, composer.
  - Billie Love, 88, Actress and photographer.
- 14 January
  - Janey Buchan, politician and campaigner (born 1926)
  - Robbie France, 52, drummer.
  - Dame Lesley Strathie, 56, British civil servant, Permanent Secretary to HM Revenue and Customs (2008–2011).
- 15 January – Sir Robert Freer, 88, military officer.
- 16 January – Dave Lee, 64, comedian.
- 18 January
  - Tom Cowie, entrepreneur (born 1922)
  - Ray Finch, 97, studio potter.
- 19 January
  - Peter de Francia, 90, artist.
  - Patrick Geoffrey O'Neill, 87, academic.
- 20 January
  - Stella Cunliffe, 95, statistician.
  - Lucy Faulkner, 87, Northern Irish journalist.
  - Marion Mathie, 86, actress.
  - Michael Welsh, 85, politician, Member of Parliament (1979–1992).
  - Walter Whitehurst, 77, English footballer.
- 21 January
  - Emmanuel Cooper, 73, potter and writer.
  - Ernie Gregory, 90, footballer.
- 22 January
  - Sarah Cullen, 62, radio and television journalist.
  - Sir Simon Marsden, 63, photographer.
- 23 January
  - David Atkinson, politician (born 1940)
  - Marge Carey, 73, union leader, President of USDAW (1997–2006).
  - Slacker, electronic music producer.
- 24 January
  - Antony Barrington Brown, 84, designer, photographer and explorer.
  - Moira Milton, 88, golfer.
  - Althea Wynne, 75, sculptor.
- 25 January
  - Sir Alfred Ball, 91, air marshal.
  - Len McIntyre, 78, rugby league player.
- 26 January
  - Ian Abercrombie, actor (born 1934)
  - Alex Eadie, politician (born 1921)
  - Colin Tarrant, actor (born 1952)
- 27 January – Ted Dicks, 83, composer.
- 28 January – Patrick Shovelton, 92, civil servant and obituarist.
- 29 January – J. O. Urmson, 96, philosopher.
- 30 January – Frederick Treves, 86, actor.
- 31 January
  - Mikel Japp, 49, musician and songwriter.
  - Sid Ottewell, 92, English footballer.

=== February ===
- 1 February – Joe Ekins, 88, soldier.
- 2 February – David Edelsten, 78, writer and army officer.
- 3 February – Samuel Youd, author (born 1922)
- 4 February
  - Nigel Doughty, businessman and football team owner (born 1957)
  - Florence Green, 110, supercentenarian and last-surviving World War I service veteran (born 1901)
  - Sir Alan Reay, 86, army officer.
- 5 February – Ray Honeyford, 77, headmaster and writer (born 1934)
- 6 February – Jim King, 69, musician (Family).
- 7 February
  - James Baring, 6th Baron Revelstoke, aristocrat (born 1938)
  - Ann Dummett, 81, British activist.
- 8 February
  - John Fairfax, 74, ocean rower and adventurer.
  - Allan Segal, documentary filmmaker (born 1941)
- 9 February
  - Josh Gifford, racehorse jockey and trainer (born 1941)
  - John Hick, philosopher and theologian (born 1922)
  - Barbara Marianowska, British-born Polish politician (born 1947)
  - Joe Moretti, 73, guitarist.
- 10 February
  - R. T. France, 73, New Testament scholar.
  - Ronald Fraser, 81, historian.
  - Brian Jones, 67, intelligence analyst.
  - James Riordan, 75, novelist and academic.
- 11 February – Jeffrey Perry, 63, stage and screen actor.
- 12 February
  - Malcolm Devitt, English footballer (born 1937)
  - Adrian Foley, 8th Baron Foley, musician and aristocrat (born 1923)
  - David Alan Walker, 83, scientist.
- 13 February
  - David Griffiths, 84, Anglican clergyman, Archdeacon of Berkshire (1987–1992).
  - Jim O'Brien, 64, film and television director.
- 14 February – Tom McAnearney, 79, footballer.
- 15 February
  - Sir Alan Cottrell, 92, metallurgist
  - Cyril Domb, 91, physicist.
  - Clive Shakespeare, 62, British-born Australian guitarist (Sherbet) and record producer.
  - James Whitaker, journalist, specialising in the British royal family and former Royal editor of the Daily Mirror (born 1940)
- 17 February – Robert Carr, politician (born 1916)
- 18 February
  - M. R. D. Foot, 92, military historian.
  - Ken Goodwin, 78, comedian (The Comedians)
  - Peter Halliday, 87, actor.
  - Miles Jackson-Lipkin, 87, barrister.
- 19 February – Robin Corbett, Baron Corbett of Castle Vale, 78, politician, MP for Hemel Hempstead (1974–1979) and Birmingham Erdington (1983–2001).
- 20 February – Michael Siegal, 61, developmental psychologist.
- 21 February
  - Emlyn Hooson, Baron Hooson, 86, politician, MP for Montgomeryshire (1962–1979). (born 1925)
  - Colin Ireland, serial killer (born 1954)
  - Leonard Rosoman, 98, artist.
  - John Charles Winter, 88, church organist.
- 22 February
  - Frank Carson, comedian (born 1926)
  - Ian Robertson, 89, admiral.
- 24 February – Oliver Wrong, 87, medical academic.
- 26 February – Richard Carpenter, screenwriter, author and actor (born 1933)
- 28 February – Peter King, 47, footballer.
- 29 February
  - Dennis Chinnery, 84, actor (Doctor Who).
  - Davy Jones, singer-songwriter and actor (born 1945)
  - Violet Wood, 112, supercentenarian, oldest person in the UK.

=== March ===
- 1 March – Peter Graeme, 90, oboist.
- 2 March
  - Gerry Bridgwood, 67, footballer (Stoke City).
  - Norman St John-Stevas, politician, author and barrister (born 1929)
- 3 March
  - Viv Bingham, 79, political activist.
  - Dave Charnley, lightweight boxer (born 1935)
- 4 March – Paul McBride, lawyer (born 1964)
- 5 March
  - Philip Madoc, actor (born 1934)
  - Robert B. Sherman, American songwriter (born 1925), died in London
- 6 March – Gemma McCluskie, actress (born 1983)
- 7 March – Sir Raymond Lygo, 87, admiral and businessman.
- 8 March
  - Ursula Dronke, 91, medievalist.
  - Mick Walker, 69, motorcycling writer
- 9 March
  - Brian Bromley, 65, footballer (Bolton Wanderers, Portsmouth).
  - Bill Wedderburn, Baron Wedderburn of Charlton, academic and politician (born 1927)
- 10 March
  - R. I. Page, 87, historian and runologist.
  - John G. Taylor, 80, physicist.
  - Jack Watson, 90, cricketer, football coach and scout.
- 11 March
  - Faith Brook, actress (born 1922)
  - Philip Jenkinson, 76, television presenter.
- 13 March – Michael P. Barnett, 82, theoretical chemist and computer scientist.
- 14 March – Ray Barlow, English footballer (born 1926)
- 15 March – Nigel Napier, 14th Lord Napier, 81, soldier and courtier.
- 16 March – Mervyn Davies, Welsh rugby union player (born 1946)
- 18 March
  - Alan Pegler, 91, railway preservationist.
  - Eric Watson, photographer (born 1955)
- 21 March
  - Christine Brooke-Rose, writer and literary critic (born 1923)
  - Robert Fuest, film director and screenwriter (born 1927)
  - Derick Thomson, 90, poet.
- 22 March
  - Ted Cutting, 85, automotive engineer, designed Aston Martin DBR1.
  - Matthew White Ridley, 4th Viscount Ridley, 86, nobleman.
  - Edward Sismore, 90, RAF officer.
  - Neil L Whitehead, 56, anthropologist.
- 24 March
  - Henry Clark, 82, colonial administrator and politician, MP for Antrim, North (1959–1970).
  - Jocky Wilson, darts player (born 1950)
- 25 March
  - John Crosfield, 96, businessman.
  - Edd Gould, animator, owner of Eddsworld (born 1988)
  - Tom Lodge, 75, British radio DJ, cancer.
  - Tony Newton, Baron Newton of Braintree, former Conservative MP and cabinet member (born 1937)
  - Bill Weston, 70, stunt performer (Saving Private Ryan, Raiders of the Lost Ark, Titanic).
- 26 March – Stella Tanner, 87, actress.
- 28 March
  - John Arden, playwright (born 1930)
  - Brian Phillips, 80, footballer (Mansfield Town).
- 29 March
  - Jonathan Bowden, politician (born 1962)
  - William Brett, Baron Brett, 70, trade unionist and politician.
  - David Walter, journalist.
- 30 March
  - Barry Kitchener, 64, footballer (Millwall).
  - Addie Morrow, 83, Northern Irish politician.
  - Emrys Roberts, 82, poet and author,

=== April ===
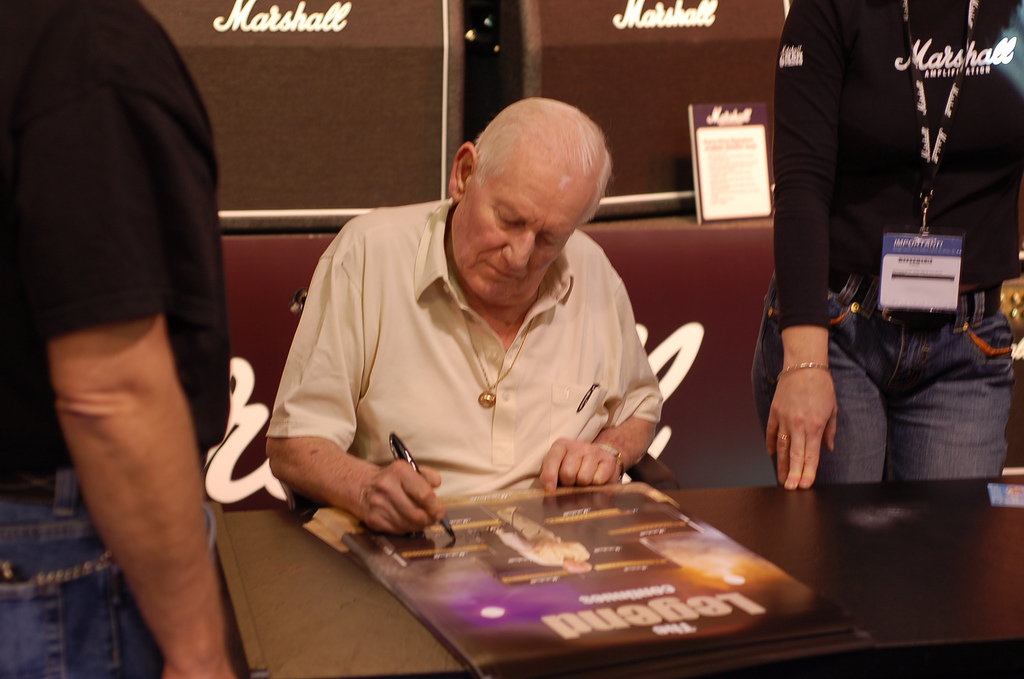
Jim Marshall

- 1 April – Stan Yapp, politician (born 1933)
- 5 April
  - David Axon astrophysicist (born 1951)
  - Jim Marshall, businessman and amplifier (born 1923)
- 6 April – Larry Canning, footballer (Aston Villa) and broadcaster, vascular dementia (born 1925)
- 7 April
  - Alexander Leslie-Melville, 14th Earl of Leven, peer and soldier, Lord Lieutenant of Nairn (1969–1999) (born 1924)
  - Miss Read, writer (born 1913)
- 8 April – Gordon Bagier, politician (born 1924)
- 9 April – Malcolm Thomas, rugby union player (born 1929)
- 10 April – John Anderson, 69, Northern Irish bioengineer.
- 12 April – Elizabeth Ferris, 71, Olympic bronze medal-winning (1960) diver.
- 14 April
  - Eddie May, footballer and manager (born 1943)
  - Synchronised, Irish racehorse (born 2003), died at the Grand National
- 16 April
  - Barry Askew, newspaper editor (born 1936)
  - Alan Hacker, clarinetist (born 1938)
  - Ray Davey, Northern Irish Presbyterian minister (born 1915)
  - Graham Simpson, 68, British musician (Roxy Music).
- 17 April – Leila Berg, children's author (born 1917)
- 18 April – Arthur Bottom, footballer (York City)
- 19 April – Leopold David de Rothschild, financier (born 1927)
- 20 April
  - Jack Ashley, politician (born 1922)
  - Alfie Biggs, footballer (born 1936)
  - Bert Weedon, guitarist and composer (born 1920)
- 21 April
  - Brian Heward, 76, footballer.
  - Charles Higham, 81, English-born American biographer.
- 23 April – Michael Brinton, businessman, Lord Lieutenant of Worcestershire (since 2001), cancer (born 1942)
- 24 April
  - Shireen Ritchie, Baroness Ritchie of Brompton, councillor and peeress (born 1945)
  - Ambrose Weekes, Anglican priest (born 1919)
- 25 April
  - Brandon Gough, businessman (born 1937)
  - Stephen Maxwell, politician (born 1942)
  - Ian Oswald, sleep researcher (born 1929)
- 26 April – Terence Spinks, gold medal-winning Olympic boxer (born 1938)
- 28 April
  - John Birch, musician (born 1929)
  - Patricia Medina, actress (born 1919)
  - Dudley Peake, 77, footballer.
  - Tom Spence, footballer, suspected heart failure (born 1962)
  - Geoffrey Tyler, educationalist (born 1920)
- 30 April
  - Cliff Ashby, poet and novelist (born 1919)
  - William Burley Lockwood, British linguist (born 1917)

=== May ===
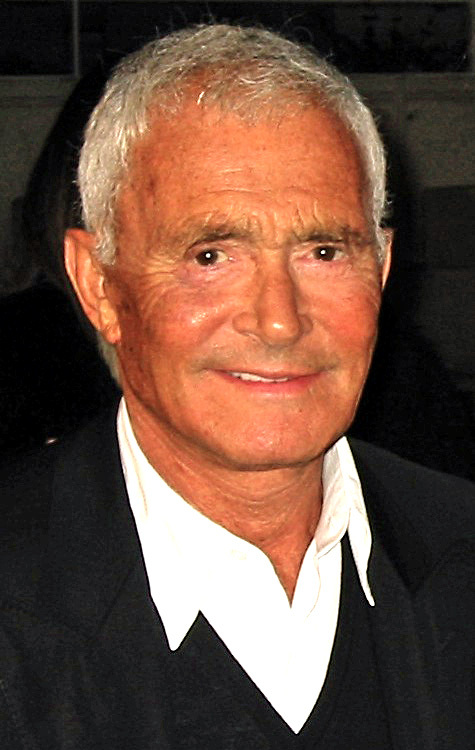
Vidal Sassoon

- 1 May – Eric James, Anglican clergyman and broadcaster (born 1925)
- 2 May
  - Peter Connolly, historian (born 1935)
  - Charlotte Mitchell, actress (born 1926)
  - Digby Wolfe, actor and screenwriter (Rowan & Martin's Laugh-In), cancer (born 1929)
- 4 May
  - Angelica Garnett, writer and painter (born 1918)
  - Edward Short, Baron Glenamara, politician, Deputy Leader of the Labour Party (1972–1976), MP for Newcastle upon Tyne Central (1951–1976) (born 1912)
- 6 May – John Slack, cricketer and judge (born 1930)
- 7 May – Sammy Barr, 80, trade union leader.
- 8 May
  - Frank Parr, cricketer and jazz musician (born 1928)
  - George Stephen Ritchie, Royal Navy admiral (born 1914)
- 9 May – Vidal Sassoon, hairdresser (born 1928)
- 10 May – Peter David, journalist (The Economist) (born 1951)
- 11 May
  - Sir Michael Kerry, civil servant (born 1923)
  - Martin Stovold, 56, cricket player (Gloucestershire).
- 13 May
  - Les Leston, British racing driver (born 1920)
  - Jean McFarlane, Baroness McFarlane of Llandaff, nurse and peer (born 1926)
  - Lee Richardson, speedway rider, in-race crash (born 1979)
  - Jack Simcock, 82, artist.
- 14 May – Derek Hammond-Stroud, opera singer (born 1926)
- 15 May
  - Sir Roy Shaw, arts administrator (born 1918)
  - Frederick E. Smith, author (633 Squadron), heart attack (born 1919)
  - George Wyllie, sculptor (born 1921)
- 16 May – Anne Warner, biologist, cerebral haemorrhage (born 1940)
- 17 May – Sophia Brown, reality show contestant (Big Brother 10) (30 years old)
- 18 May
  - Peter Jones, drummer (Crowded House), brain cancer (born 1963)
  - Alan Oakley, designer of Raleigh Chopper bicycle, cancer (born 1927)
- 20 May
  - Robin Gibb, singer-songwriter (born 1949)
  - John George, officer of arms (81 years old)
  - David Littman, historian and human rights activist (born 1933)
- 22 May
  - Janet Lees Price, actress (born 1943)
  - Sir Derek Wanless, banker and public policy adviser, pancreatic cancer (born 1947)
- 25 May – Doug Walton, rugby league player
- 26 May – Stephen Healey, Army officer and footballer (Swansea City), improvised explosive device (born 1982)
- 28 May
  - Hugh Dawnay, soldier and polo player (born 1932)
  - Bob Edwards, journalist (born 1925)
- 29 May –
  - Cassandra Jardine, 57, journalist.
  - Ivor Porter, diplomat (born 1913)
- 30 May – Sir Andrew Huxley, physiologist, biophysicist, and Nobel laureate (Physiology or Medicine, 1963) (born 1917)

=== June ===
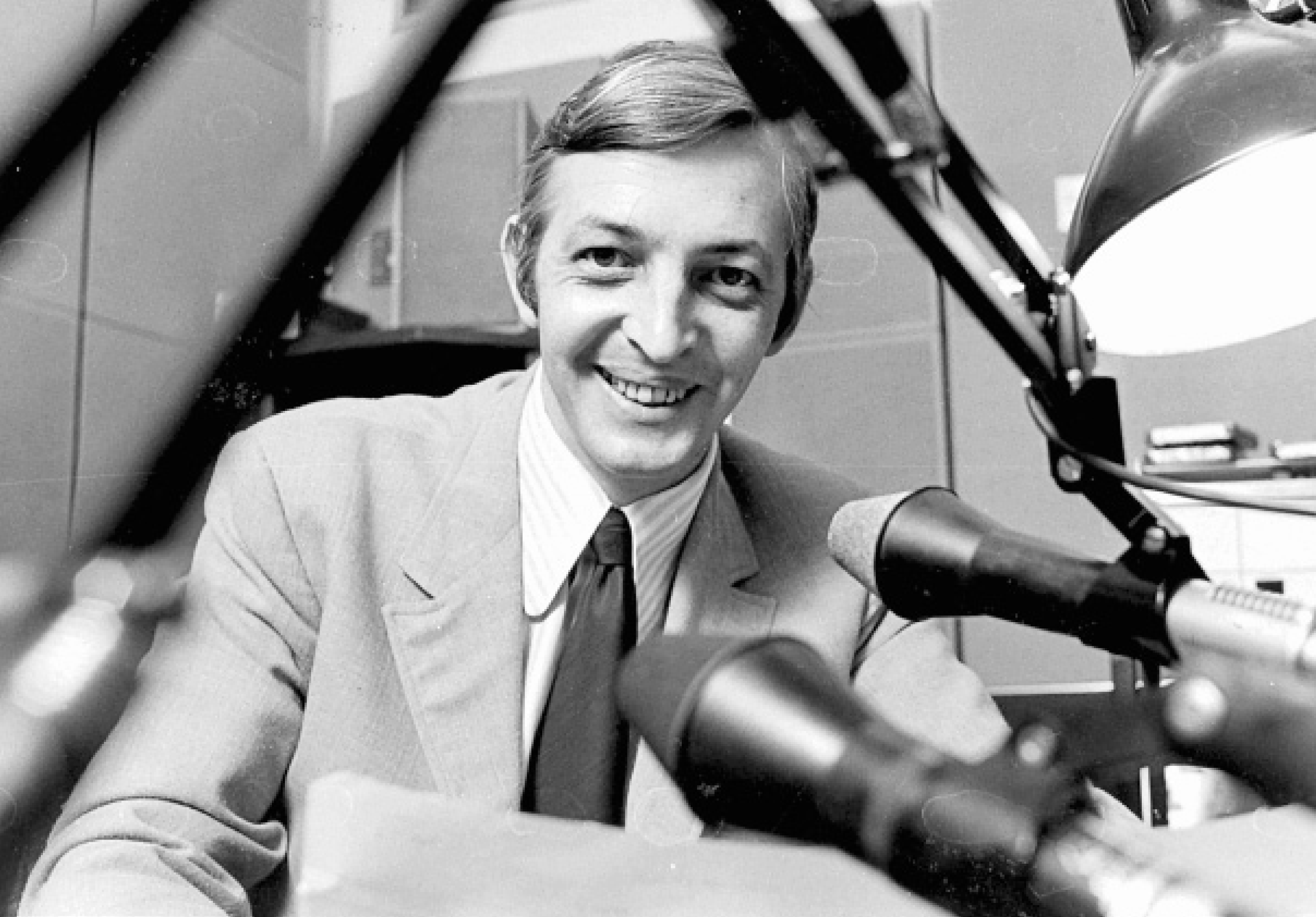
Don Durbridge

- 2 June – Richard Dawson, Anglo-American comedian and game show host (born 1932)
- 3 June
  - Andy Hamilton, Jamaican-born jazz saxophonist and composer (born 1918)
  - John Lang, British Anglican priest and broadcaster, Dean of Lichfield (1980–1993) (born 1927)
  - Roy Salvadori, racing driver (born 1922)
- 4 June
  - Bobby Black, Scottish football player (born c.1927)
  - Barney Gibbens, British businessman (born 1935)
  - Philip Snow, British cricketer and administrator (born 1915)
- 5 June
  - Steve Buttle, English football player and coach (born 1953)
  - Caroline John, actress (born 1940)
  - Chris Thompson, English footballer (born 1960)
  - Barry Unsworth, novelist (born 1930)
- 7 June
  - David Gibson, English cricketer (born 1936)
  - Peter Gray, 85, chemist
- 9 June
  - Don Durbridge, broadcaster (born 1939)
  - John Maples, Baron Maples, politician (born 1943)
- 10 June – Gordon West, English football player (Everton) (born 1943)
- 11 June – A.M. Parkin, 68, English artist
- 13 June – James Ashworth, 23, English soldier, awarded Victoria Cross
- 14 June
  - Gitta Sereny, Hungarian historian, died in Cambridge (born 1921)
  - Peter Archer, Baron Archer of Sandwell, politician (born 1926)
- 15 June – Angus Wright, 78, television producer
- 16 June – Scott Johnson, drum technician (Radiohead, Keane) (33 years old)
- 17 June
  - George Leech, stuntman and actor (James Bond films) (90 years old)
  - Bernard Prior, 78, rugby league player
- 18 June
  - Brian Hibbard, actor and singer (born 1946)
  - Tom Maynard, cricketer (born 1989)
  - Victor Spinetti, actor (born 1929)
- 19 June
  - Anthony Bate, actor (born 1927)
  - Gerry Bron, record producer and band manager (born 1933)
  - Michael Palliser, diplomat (born 1922)
- 20 June
  - Alexander Vane-Tempest-Stewart, 9th Marquess of Londonderry, nobleman (born 1937)
  - Michael Westmacott, mountaineer (born 1925)
- 21 June
  - William Stewart, Lord Allanbridge, Scottish judge and politician (born 1925)
  - Abid Hussain, Indian civil servant and diplomat (born 1926), died in London
  - Teddy Scott, Scottish footballer (born 1929)
  - Drew Turnbull, British rugby player (born c.1930)
- 22 June
  - Mary Fedden, artist and painter (born 1915)
  - Jackie Neilson, Scottish footballer (St Mirren) (born 1929)
  - Margaret Wright, 72, British politician, Principal Speaker of the Green Party (1999–2003).
- 23 June
  - James Durbin, British statistician and econometrician (born 1923)
  - Ken Hargreaves, British politician, MP for Hyndburn (1983–1992) (born 1939)
  - Alan McDonald, Northern Irish footballer (born 1963)
- 24 June – James Grout, English actor (Inspector Morse) (born 1927)
- 25 June
  - Norman Felton, British-born American television producer (The Man from U.N.C.L.E.) (born 1913)
  - Campbell Gillies, Scottish jockey (born 1990)
- 27 June – Stan Cox, British Olympic athlete (1948, 1952) (born 1918)
- 28 June
  - Ron Lynch, English cricketer (born 1923)
  - Devaanshi Mehta, started the Asian Donor Campaign (ADC) (born 1996)
- 30 June – Michael Abney-Hastings, 14th Earl of Loudoun, British Australian peer (born 1942)

=== July ===
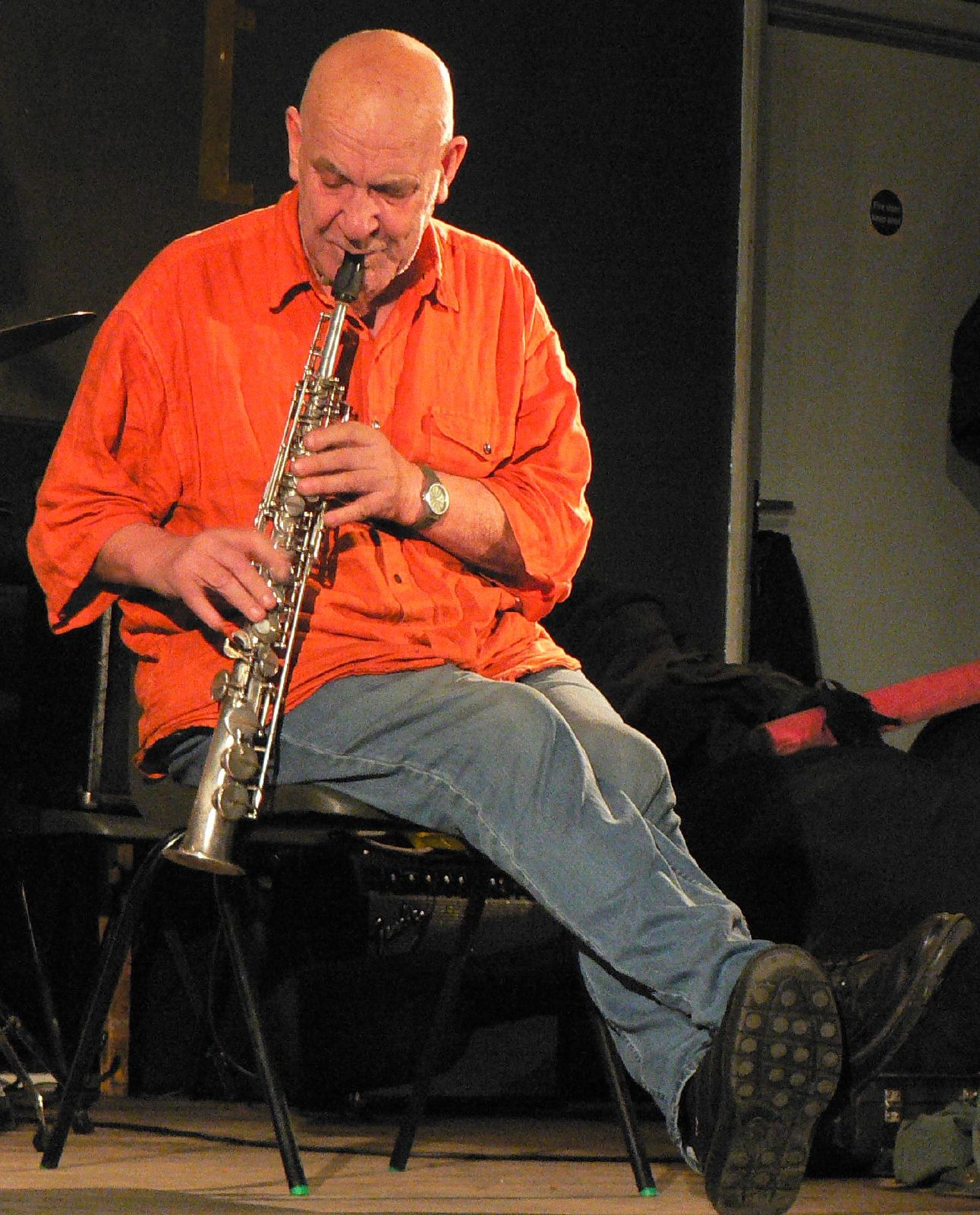
Lol Coxhill

- 1 July – Dennis Eagan, 85, hockey player and soldier.
- 3 July – Leo Kersley, 92, dancer and teacher.
- 4 July
  - Paul Birch, 56, scientist and author.
  - Eric Sykes, actor and writer (born 1923)
- 5 July – Colin Marshall, Baron Marshall of Knightsbridge, businessman and life peer (born 1933)
- 7 July
  - Jimmy Tansey, footballer (born 1929)
  - Alf Pearson, variety performer, mostly with his brother Bob (as part of Bob and Alf Pearson) (born 1910)
- 8 July
  - Chris Barber, 91, businessman, chairman of Oxfam (1983–1989).
  - Henry Chilver, Baron Chilver, 86, engineer and politician.
- 9 July – Brian Thomas, 72, rugby union player and manager (Neath RFC).
- 10 July – Lol Coxhill, 79, jazz saxophonist.
- 11 July
  - Sir Carron Greig, 87, business executive.
  - Joe McBride, 74, football player (Celtic).
  - Bobby Nicol, 76, football player (Hibernian).
  - Harold Shukman, 81, historian.
- 12 July
  - Eddy Brown, 86, footballer (Birmingham City).
  - Roger Payne, 55, mountaineer.
- 13 July – Christopher Booth, 88, clinician and medical historian.<
- 14 July
  - John Arbuthnott, 16th Viscount of Arbuthnott, 87, peer.
  - Philip Crosland, 93, journalist.
  - Sir David House, 89, Army general and Black Rod (1978–1985).
  - Roy Shaw, 76, businessman and boxer.
- 15 July – Sir David Fraser, 91, Army general.
- 16 July
  - Martin Kenzie, 56, cinematographer
  - Jon Lord, musician (born 1941)
  - Sir David Williams, 91, admiral, Governor of Gibraltar (1982–1985).
- 17 July
  - Richard Evatt, 38, boxer.
  - Marsha Singh, 57, politician, MP for Bradford West (1997–2012).
- 18 July – Jack Matthews, 92, rugby union player and doctor.
- 19 July
  - Brian Dobson, 80, archaeologist.
  - E. V. Thompson, 81, author.
- 20 July
  - Sir Alastair Burnet, 84, journalist and broadcaster.
  - John Davidson, 2nd Viscount Davidson, 83, peer and politician.
  - John Monteith, 81, academic.
  - Simon Ward, 70, actor.
- 21 July
  - Alexander Cockburn, 71, political journalist and writer.
  - Geoffrey Hattersley-Smith, 89, glaciologist.
  - Angharad Rees, actress (born 1944)
  - Don Wilson, 74, cricketer.
- 22 July – Eric Bell, 82, footballer (Bolton Wanderers).
- 23 July
  - Graham Jackson, 45, conductor and music director.
  - Ernie Machin, 68, footballer (Coventry City, Plymouth Argyle).
- 24 July – Sir Kenneth Crook, 91, diplomat, Ambassador to Afghanistan (1976–1979).
- 25 July
  - David Barby, 69, antiques expert (Bargain Hunt).
  - Barry Langford, 86, television director and producer.
- 26 July – Mary Tamm, Doctor Who actress (born 1950)
- 27 July – Geoffrey Hughes, actor (born 1944)
- 28 July
  - Phyllis Deane, 93, economic historian.
  - Peter Evans-Freke, 11th Baron Carbery, 92, Anglo-Irish peer.
  - James Marriott, 39, film critic and author.
  - Ruth Mott, 95, television cook.
  - David Thomas, 53, cricketer.
- 29 July – James Mellaart, 87, archaeologist.
- 30 July – Les Green, 70, footballer (Derby County) and manager (Tamworth).
- 31 July – Mollie Hunter, 90, writer.

=== August ===
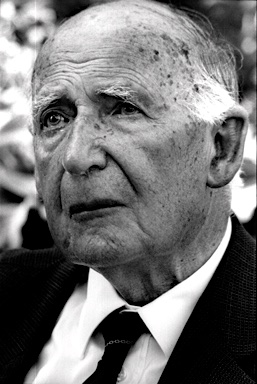
Sir Bernard Lovell

- 1 August – Barry Trapnell, 88, cricketer and headmaster.
- 2 August
  - Gabriel Horn, 85, biologist.
  - Sir John Keegan, 78, military historian and journalist.
  - William Smith, 4th Viscount Hambleden, 82, peer,
- 3 August – John Berry, 67, speedway promoter.
- 4 August
  - Brian Crozier, 94, author and journalist.
  - Jimmy Thomson, 75, footballer (Dunfermline Athletic).
- 6 August – Sir Bernard Lovell, physicist and radio astronomer (born 1913)
- 8 August – Ruth Etchells, 81, poet and college principal.
- 11 August
  - Dame Simone Prendergast, 82, public servant and philanthropist.
  - Stuart Randall, Baron Randall of St Budeaux, 74, politician, MP for Kingston upon Hull West (1983–1997).
  - Sid Waddell, 72, darts commentator and author.
- 12 August
  - Eileen Beasley, 91, teacher and Welsh language campaigner.
  - Alex Falconer, 72, politician, MEP for Mid Scotland and Fife (1984–1999).
  - Alf Morris, Baron Morris, 84, politician and disability rights campaigner, MP for Manchester Wythenshawe (1964–1997).
  - Jackie Watters, 92, footballer (Celtic).
- 14 August – Brian Green, 77, football coach and player.
- 15 August
  - Jeffery Boswall, 81, naturalist and broadcaster.
  - Mitchell Todd, 21, rugby player.
  - Sir Ray Whitney, 81, politician, MP for Wycombe (1978–2001).
- 17 August
  - Winnie Johnson, 78, justice campaigner, mother of Moors murders victim Keith Bennett.
  - Geoffrey Lees, 92, cricketer and educator.
  - Lou Martin, 63, Northern Irish musician.
  - Brian Oakley, 84, civil servant and scientist.
- 18 August – Mike Hewland, 89, engineer, founder of Hewland engineering company.
- 19 August – Tony Scott, 68, film director and producer.
- 20 August – Len Quested, 87, footballer.
- 22 August
  - Nina Bawden, 87, author (Carrie's War).
  - Tony Nicklinson, 58, sufferer of locked-in syndrome, right-to-die advocate.
- 24 August
  - Louise Clarke, 62, dancer (Pan's People).
  - Sir Richard Evans, 84, diplomat, Ambassador to the People's Republic of China (1984–1988).
  - Dominic Hibberd, 71, biographer.
- 25 August
  - Ray Booty, 79, cyclist.
  - Stephen Bradford, 48, English cricket player (Lincolnshire).
  - Donald Gorrie, 79, politician, MSP for Central Scotland (1999–2007), MP for Edinburgh West (1997–2001).
  - Emilio Pacione, 92, footballer (Dundee United).
- 26 August – Alan Steen, 90, footballer (Wolverhampton Wanderers).
- 27 August
  - Tony Dumper, 88, Anglican prelate, Bishop of Dudley (1977–1993).
  - Allan Horsfall, 84, gay rights activist.
  - Roger J. White, 71, British-born American Episcopal prelate, Bishop of Milwaukee (1985–2003).
- 28 August
  - Sir Rhodes Boyson, 87, politician.
  - Eva Figes, 80, author.
- 29 August – Nicholas Goodrick-Clarke, 59, academic and author (The Occult Roots of Nazism).
- 31 August – Max Bygraves, 89, singer and variety performer.

=== September ===
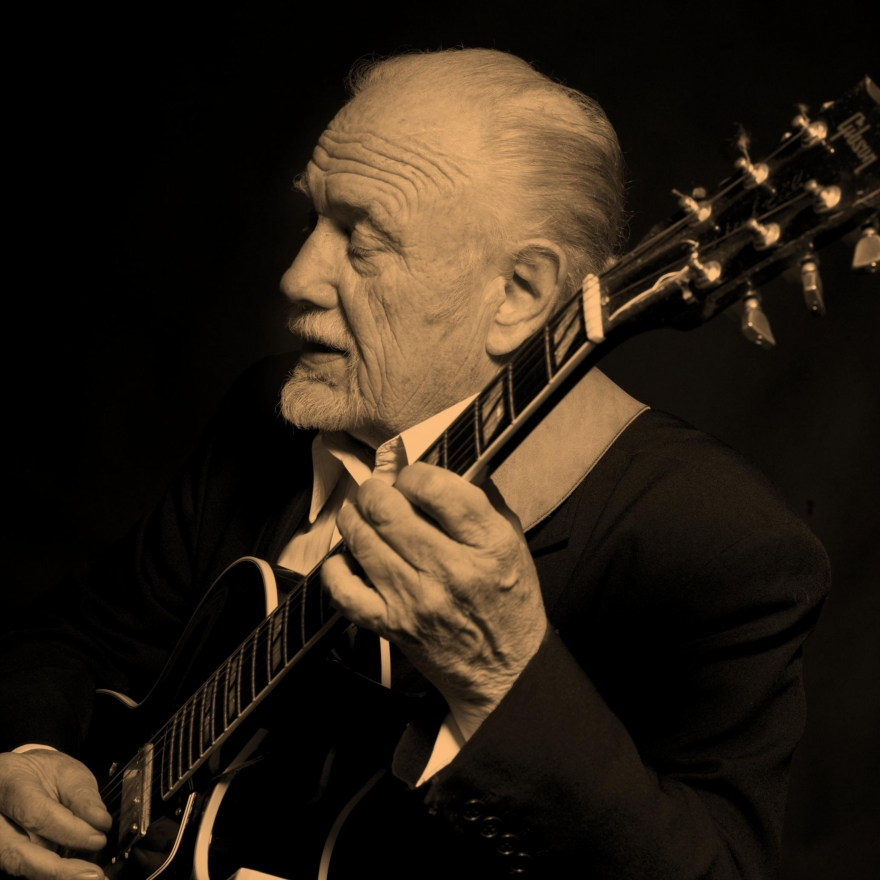
John C. Marshall

- 1 September – David R. Morrison, 71, writer and painter.
- 2 September – John C. Marshall, 71, musician.
- 3 September – Sir Andrew Crockett, 69, banker.
- 4 September – Ian Parrott, 95, composer and academic.
- 5 September
  - Alan Kimber, 63, English swimmer.
  - John Lawrence, 2nd Baron Oaksey, 83, peer and horse racing journalist.
- 6 September
  - Lawrie Dring, 81, scouter, President of the Baden-Powell Scouts' Association.
  - Frank Godwin, 95, film producer (Woman in a Dressing Gown).
  - Terry Nutkins, 66, TV presenter and naturalist.
- 7 September – Nicole Milinaire, 92, socialite, Duchess of Bedford.
- 8 September – Bill Moggridge, 69, industrial designer.
- 9 September
  - Hugh Bentall, 92, surgeon.
  - Ron Tindall, 76, footballer (Chelsea).
- 10 September
  - Stanley Long, 78, cinematographer and film director.
  - James Wellbeloved, 86, politician, MP for Erith and Crayford (1965–1983).
- 11 September – Maurice Keen, 75, historian.
- 12 September
  - Jimmy Andrews, 85, footballer.
  - Geoffrey Horrocks, 79, mathematician.
  - Derek Jameson, 82, journalist and broadcaster.
  - Sid Watkins, 84, neurosurgeon, Formula One safety and medical delegate.
- 13 September
  - John Turner, 63, cricketer.
  - Edgar Metcalfe, 78, actor and theatre director.
- 14 September
  - Pinkie Barnes, 97, table tennis player.
  - Frank Dudley, 87, footballer.
- 15 September
  - Griffith Edwards, c.84, psychiatrist.
  - George Hurst, 86, conductor.
  - Nevin Spence, 22, Northern Irish rugby union player (Ulster).
- 16 September – John Coates, 85, animated film producer (The Snowman).
- 17 September – Lou Kenton, 104, potter and Spanish Civil War veteran.
- 18 September
  - Michael Hurll, 78, television producer.
  - Malcolm Struel, 78, solicitor, Chairman of Swansea City (1973–1982).
  - Brian Woolnough, 63, sports journalist.
- 19 September
  - Patrick Creagh, 81, poet and translator.
  - Elizabeth Diana Percy, Duchess of Northumberland, 90, peeress.
  - Charlie Richardson, 78, mobster.
- 20 September
  - Alan Neville Gent, 84, scientist.
  - Dorothy Wedderburn, 87, academic.
- 21 September
  - Mike Baker, 55, journalist (BBC, The Guardian).
  - Bill King, 102, naval officer, yachtsman, and author.
  - Len Weare, 78, footballer (Newport County).
- 22 September
  - Robert Davidson, 85, theologian.
  - Harry Pilling, 69, cricketer (Lancashire).
- 23 September
  - Sir Godfrey Milton-Thompson, 82, naval surgeon.
  - Michael Vincent Paschal Rowland, 83, Roman Catholic prelate, Bishop of Dundee, South Africa (1983–2005).
- 25 September
  - John Bond, 79, football player and manager.
  - Trevor Hardy, 67, serial killer.
  - Eric Ives, 81, historian.
  - Dame Louise Johnson, 71, biochemist and protein crystallographer
- 28 September – Crispin Aubrey, 66, journalist and environmental activist.
- 29 September
  - Neil Smith, 58, geographer.
  - Malcolm Wicks, 65, politician, MP for Croydon North West (1992–1997) and Croydon North (1997–2012).
- 30 September – Mary Freeman-Grenville, 12th Lady Kinloss, 90, peeress.

=== October ===
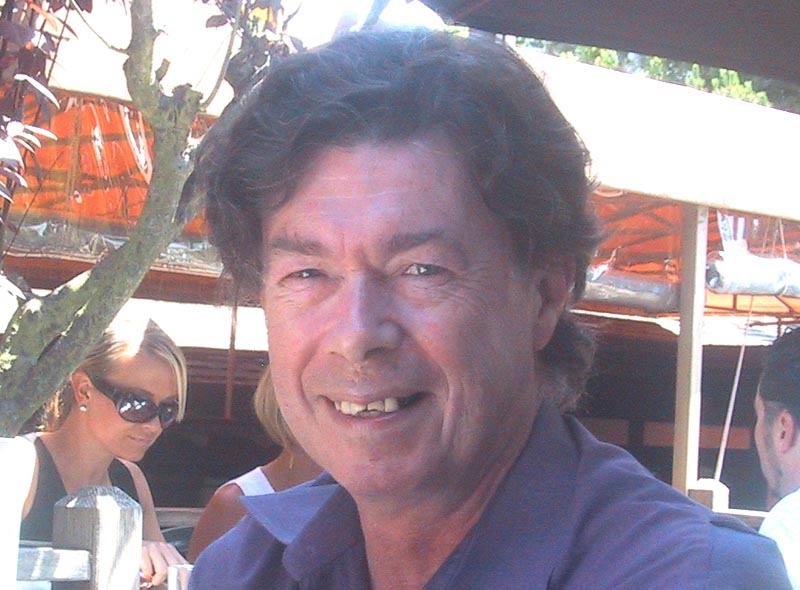
Mike Singleton

- 1 October – Eric Hobsbawm, 95, historian.
- 2 October
  - Nicholas C. Handy, 71, chemist.
  - Big Jim Sullivan, 71, guitarist.
- 3 October
  - Billy Hullin, 70, rugby union player.
  - Albie Roles, 91, footballer.
- 4 October
  - Jim Galley, 68, cricket player (Somerset).
  - Bernard Holden, 104, railway preservationist (Bluebell Railway).
  - Daphne Slater, 84, actress
- 5 October – Keith Campbell, 58, biologist.
- 6 October
  - Anthony John Cooke, 80, organist.
  - J. J. C. Smart, 92, British-born Australian philosopher
- 8 October
  - Bill Drake, 81, rugby league player.
  - Eric Lomax, 93, author.
- 9 October
  - Paddy Roy Bates, 91, pirate radio broadcaster, founded Principality of Sealand.
  - Eddie Harvey, 86, jazz musician.
- 10 October
  - Malcolm Sampson, 72, rugby league player.
  - Mike Singleton, 61, video game developer.
- 12 October
  - Geraldine Mucha, 95, composer.
  - Tony Pawson, 91, cricketer and writer (Kent).
- 13 October
  - Sir Stuart Bell, 74, politician, MP for Middlesbrough (since 1983).
  - Frank Sando, 81, cross-country runner.
- 14 October
  - John Clive, 79, actor (A Clockwork Orange, The Italian Job).
  - Sir John Moreton, 94, diplomat.
  - Elizabeth Watkins, 89, author
  - Buster Pearson, 71, pop group manager (Five Star).
- 15 October
  - Maria Petrou, 59, computer scientist.
  - Jim Rollo, 75, footballer.
- 16 October – Susan Parkinson, 87, potter and charity worker.
- 17 October – Milija Aleksic, 61, footballer (Tottenham Hotspur).
- 18 October – Christopher Allen, 68, cricket player (Dorset).
- 19 October
  - Walter Harrison, 91, politician, MP for Wakefield (1964–1987), Government Deputy Chief Whip (1974–1979).
  - Jack Hirst, 75, rugby league player.
  - John Radford, 65, writer.
- 20 October
  - Joe Melia, 77, actor.
  - Daphne Skillern, 84, police officer.
- 21 October
  - J Duncan M Derrett, 90, academic
  - William Walker, 99, fighter pilot (Battle of Britain).
- 22 October – Mike Morris, 65, television presenter
- 23 October
  - Hughie Hay, 80, footballer.
  - Michael Marra, 60, musician and songwriter,
- 24 October – Peter Wright, 78, footballer (Colchester United F.C.).
- 25 October – John Connelly, 74, footballer (Burnley F.C.).
- 26 October – Jo Dunne, 43, guitarist (Fuzzbox).
- 27 October
  - Ian Buist, 82, diplomat.
  - Alan Shaxon, 78, magician.
- 28 October – Jack Dellal, 83, property investor.
- 29 October – Wallace L. W. Sargent, 77, astronomer.
- 30 October – Wayland Tunley, 75, architect.
- 31 October
  - Nona Byrne, 90, Building Society founder and philanthropist.
  - Brian Cobby, 83, actor, voice of the speaking clock (1985–2007).
  - Bernard John Smith, 61, geologist.
  - Fergie Sutherland, 81, horse trainer.

=== November ===
- 1 November
  - Geoffrey Lofthouse, 86, politician, MP for Pontefract and Castleford (1978–1997).
  - Jonathan Street, 69, novelist.
- 2 November
  - Han Suyin, 95, writer (A Many-Splendoured Thing).
  - Ken Stephinson, 79, television director and producer.
  - Roger Wood, 87, editor and journalist (Daily Express, New York Post).
- 3 November
  - George Chesterton, 90, cricketer.
  - Duke Vin, disk jockey and sound system operator.
  - Tommy Godwin, 91, Olympic bronze medal-winning (1948) track cyclist.
- 4 November
  - Beverley Goodway, 69, glamour photographer.
  - Reg Pickett, 85, footballer (Portsmouth, Ipswich Town).
- 5 November – Jimmy Stephen, 90, footballer.
- 6 November
  - Clive Dunn, 92, actor
  - Ivor Powell, 96, footballer (Queens Park Rangers, Aston Villa) and coach (Carlisle United, Team Bath).
- 7 November
  - Harry McShane, 92, footballer.
  - David Olive, 75, theoretical physicist.
- 8 November
  - Bobby Gilfillan, 74, footballer (Doncaster Rovers).
  - Roger Hammond, 76, actor (Around the World in 80 Days).
- 9 November
  - John Attenborough, 84, businessman, brother of Richard Attenborough and David Attenborough.
  - Valerie Eliot, 86, editor, widow of T. S. Eliot.
  - Bill Tarmey, 71, actor.
- 10 November
  - Robert Carter, 102, Royal Air Force officer.
  - Eric Devenport, 86, Anglican prelate, Bishop of Dunwich (1980–1992).
  - Eric Day, 91, footballer (Southampton F.C.).
  - Marian Lines, 78, writer and actress.
- 11 November
  - Joe Egan, 93, rugby league player.
  - Sir Rex Hunt, 86, diplomat and colonial administrator, Governor of the Falkland Islands (1980–1985).
  - Cornel Lucas, 92, photographer.
- 12 November
  - Alan Hopkins, 86, politician.
  - Fred Ridgeway, 59, actor.
  - Ronald Stretton, 82, Olympic bronze medal-winning (1952) track cyclist.
  - John Winter, 82, architect.
- 13 November
  - Kenneth Cragg, 99, Anglican priest and scholar.
  - Robert Shirley, 13th Earl Ferrers, 83, peer, Deputy Leader of the House of Lords (1979–1983, 1988–1997).
  - John Sheridan, 78, rugby league player (Castleford).
- 14 November – Norman Greenwood, 87, chemist.
- 15 November – Keith Ripley, 77, footballer.
- 16 November
  - Leo Blair, 89, academic, father of Tony Blair.
  - Eric Burgin, 88, cricketer (Yorkshire).
  - William Turnbull, 90, artist.
- 17 November – Margaret Yorke, 88, crime fiction writer.
- 18 November
  - Stan Greig, 82, pianist, drummer, and bandleader.
  - Sir Philip Ledger, 74, classical musician and academic.
  - William McCarthy, Baron McCarthy, 87, politician and life peer.
  - Kenny Morgans, 73, footballer (Manchester United), Munich air disaster survivor.
- 19 November – John Hefin, 71, television director and producer (Pobol y Cwm, The Life and Times of David Lloyd George).
- 20 November
  - Michael Dunford, British musician (Renaissance),
  - Gary Ingham, 48, footballer.
- 21 November
  - Stephen Abrams, 74, drug policy activist.
  - Charles Denman, 5th Baron Denman, 96, businessman and peer.
- 23 November – Diana, Lady Isaac, 91, environmentalist and arts patron.
- 24 November
  - Alec Campbell, 80, archaeologist and historian.
  - Ian Campbell, 79, folk musician (Ian Campbell Folk Group).
  - Chris Stamp, 70, music producer and manager (The Who).
- 25 November
  - Bert Linnecor, 78, footballer.
  - Dave Sexton, 82, footballer and manager (Chelsea, Manchester United).
  - Dinah Sheridan, 92, actress.
- 26 November – Denis Haynes, 88, cricket player (Staffordshire).
- 27 November – Bob Kellett, 84, film and television director.
- 27 November – Sir William Bulmer, 92, 1businessman, Lord Lieutenant of West Yorkshire (1978–1985).
- 29 November – Maddalena Fagandini, 83, electronic musician and television producer.
- 30 November
  - Stephen Gray, 89, musical administrator, managed the Royal Liverpool Philharmonic.
  - Dolores Mantez, 82, television actress (UFO).

=== December ===
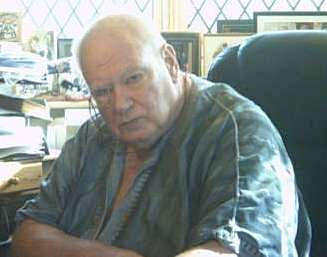
Sir Patrick Moore

- 1 December
  - Mitchell Cole, 27, footballer (Southend United, Stevenage Borough).
  - Steve Fox, 54, footballer.
  - Phil Taylor, 95, footballer and coach (Liverpool).
- 2 December – Michael Crawford, 92, cricket player.
- 3 December – Sir Geoffrey Shakerley, 80, photographer.
- 4 December
  - Anthony Deane-Drummond, 95, army general.
  - Jonathan Harvey, 73, composer.
  - Michael Till, 77, Anglican priest, Dean of Winchester (1996–2005).
- 5 December
  - Petrine Archer-Straw, 55, art historian.
  - Doug Smith, 75, football player and administrator (Dundee United).
  - Felix Weinberg, 84, physicist.
- 6 December
  - Eta Cohen, 96, violin teacher and author.
  - Huw Lloyd-Langton, 61, guitarist (Hawkwind, Widowmaker).
- 8 December – John Gowans, 78, religious leader and musician, General of The Salvation Army (1999–2002).
- 9 December
  - Sir Patrick Moore, 89, astronomer.
  - Alex Moulton, 92, mechanical engineer and inventor.
- 10 December
  - Roy Miles, 72, art dealer.
  - Tommy Roberts, 70, fashion designer.
  - Reginald James Wallace, 93, civil servant, last Governor of the Gilbert Islands (1978–1979).
- 11 December – Sophie Firth, 3, child actress (Emmerdale).
- 12 December – Richard Eyre, 83, Anglican priest, Dean of Exeter (1981–1996).
- 13 December
  - Ian Black, 88, footballer.
  - David Tait, 25, rugby player.
- 14 December
  - John Graham, 89, army general.
  - Kenneth Kendall, 88, television broadcaster (BBC News, Treasure Hunt).
- 15 December – John Anderson Strong, 97, physician and academic.
- 16 December
  - Peter Clarke, 77, cartoonist.
  - Sheila Casey (née McKinley), 71, singer.
- 17 December
  - Charlie Adam, 50, footballer.
  - Chinwe Chukwuogo-Roy, 60, artist.
  - Sir Colin Spedding, 87, biologist and agricultural scientist.
- 18 December
  - Jim Patterson, 84, footballer.
  - George Showell, 78, footballer.
  - Sir Marcus Worsley, 5th Baronet, 87, politician, MP for Keighley (1959–1964) and Chelsea (1966–1974).
- 19 December
  - Sir Lawrie Barratt, 85, businessman (Barratt Developments).
  - Colin Davis, 79, racing driver, winner of 1964 Targa Florio.
- 20 December
  - Bill Bell, 100, army officer and lawyer.
  - Stan Charlton, 83, footballer (Leyton Orient, Arsenal).
  - Alan Cowey, 77, scientist.
  - Dennis Stevens, 79, footballer (Bolton Wanderers, Everton).
- 21 December
  - David Lomon, 94, military veteran, member of the International Brigade.
  - Daphne Oxenford, 93, actress
- 22 December
  - Wattie Dick, 85, footballer (Accrington Stanley).
  - Gerald Melling, 69, architect and writer.
- 23 December – Dennis Greenland, 75, soil scientist.
- 24 December
  - Richard Rodney Bennett, 76, composer, musician and film scorer (Nicholas and Alexandra, Murder on the Orient Express).
  - Douglas Hamilton, 65, journalist.
- 25 December
  - Sir Neville Bosworth, 94, politician, Lord Mayor of Birmingham (1969–1970).
  - Rachel Douglas-Home, 27th Baroness Dacre, 83, peeress.
  - John Josephs, 88, cricketer (Leicestershire).
- 26 December
  - Gerry Anderson, 83, British producer, writer and director (Thunderbirds, Captain Scarlet and the Mysterons), Alzheimer's disease.
  - Henri Strzelecki, 87, Polish-born British fashion designer, co-founder of Henri Lloyd.
- 27 December
  - Hamid Ghodse, 74, scientist, expert in substance abuse and dependence,
  - Archie Roy, 88, scientist.
- 28 December
  - John Carol Case, 89, English opera singer.
  - Barrie Edgar, 93, television producer (Come Dancing, Gardeners' World).
  - Jon Finch, 70, actor.
  - George Patterson, 92, missionary and journalist.
- 29 December
  - Bob Astles, 88, British-born Ugandan government adviser.
  - Henri Bortoft, 74, philosopher of science.
  - Tony Greig, 66, cricketer, England captain (1975–1977) and television commentator.
  - George Hazlett, 89, footballer.
  - William Rees-Mogg, Baron Rees-Mogg, journalist and life peer, Editor of The Times (1967–1981),
- 30 December
  - Sir Irvine Patnick, 83, politician, MP for Sheffield Hallam (1987–1997).
  - Vic Turner, 85, trade unionist (Transport and General Workers' Union), member of the Pentonville Five.
- 31 December
  - Alasdair Liddell, 63, health executive.
  - Alan Reece, 85, engineer and businessman.

== See also ==
- 2012 in British music
- 2012 in British television
- List of British films of 2012
