= Edelsten =

Edelsten is a surname. Notable people with the surname include:

- Brynne Edelsten (born 1983), American television personality, socialite, actress and fitness instructor
- David Edelsten (1933–2012), English writer, British Army officer and charity organizer
- Geoffrey Edelsten (1943–2021), Australian medical entrepreneur
- John Edelsten (1891–1966), British Royal Navy officer
