= Lou Kenton =

English proofreader who served as a medical courier and ambulance driver

- Born: 1 September 1908; Stepney, London, England
- Died: 17 September 2012 (aged 104); West Acton, London, England
- Occupations: soldier, seaman, proofreader
- Known for: opposition to the British Union of Fascists; service in the International Brigades
- Spouse(s): 1. Lillian (divorced); 2. Raffa Ephgrave (married 1941)

Lou Kenton (1 September 1908 – 17 September 2012) was an English proofreader who served as a medical courier and ambulance driver with the International Brigade and was its oldest surviving member at the time of his death.

== Early life ==
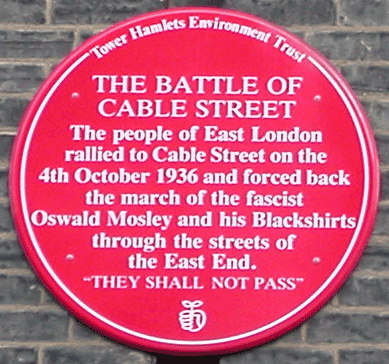
Plaque commemorating the Battle of Cable Street

Kenton was born in Stepney, east London to a Jewish Ukrainian family who had escaped from Tsarist pogroms. His father died from tuberculosis when he was young.

Kenton left school aged 14 and started work in a paper factory. There he first encountered anti-semitism, which led him to join the Communist Party of Great Britain in 1929. He took part in the CPGB's disruption of the British Union of Fascists' rally at Olympia in June 1934 and resistance to the BUF in the Battle of Cable Street in October 1936.

== Spain ==
Early in 1937 Kenton left Stepney and rode his Douglas motorcycle to Albacete, where he join the International Brigades in the Spanish Civil War. His first wife Lillian, an Austrian nurse who fled Nazi Germany in 1933, shortly followed him. When he arrived at the International Brigades headquarters in Albacete, he applied to join the International Brigade's Medical Unit. It was from there that he spent nearly two years in action as medical courier on his motorcycle distributing medical supplies to hospitals across the country, and as an ambulance driver on the front lines. He returned to Britain late in 1938 on an 'Aid for Spain' mission to raise money for a new ambulance. By the time he had completed his tour, the International Brigades had been disbanded.

== Later life ==
After the International Brigades were withdrawn from Spain, Kenton was hugely depressed. One of his missions was to repatriate to the Spanish authorities the Basque refugees given asylum in the United Kingdom. It was "the first time I saw the fascist police in their three-cornered hats. All the children were in tears and all of them were hanging on to me as we checked each one and handed them over."

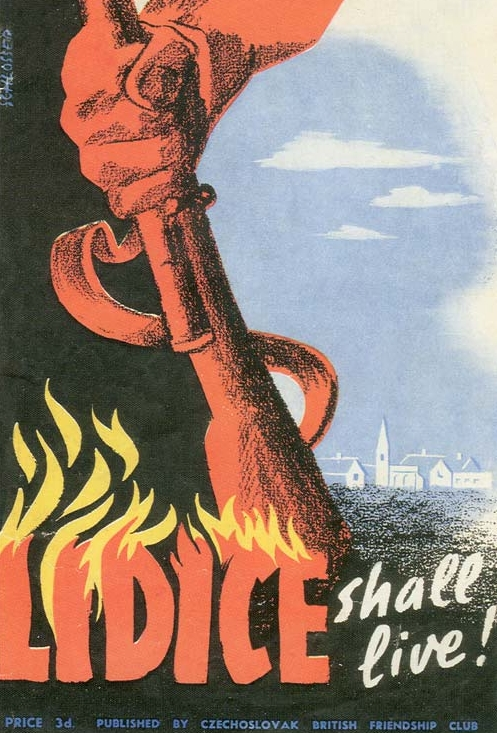
British "Lidice shall live" poster

Kenton then joined the Merchant Navy and in the first part of the Second World War served on an Antarctic whaler, the Southern Princess. He and Lillian were divorced and in 1941 Kenton married his second wife Raffa Ephgrave. He was wounded in The Blitz, spent two years in hospital and then took a factory job. After the Lidice massacre in Czechoslovakia in 1942, Kenton joined the British "Lidice Shall Live" organisation. He was an active member for many years and in the 1990s served as its Chairman.

After the Second World War, Kenton joined the Homes for Heroes campaign, which helped homeless ex-servicemen and their families to squat in unoccupied properties. He joined the Financial Times as a proofreader, and continued to work there until he was in his 70s.

Kenton remained a devout communist, working tirelessly on trade union organisation, unemployed marches and party activities until 1968 when the Prague Spring was suppressed by the Soviet Union. He then joined the Labour Party and remained a member for the rest of his life.

=== Commemorative potter ===
From 1980 Kenton produced commemorative pottery for the trade union movement and for radical causes. His work was commissioned by Associated Society of Locomotive Engineers and Firemen, Tobacco Workers' Union, Society of Graphical and Allied Trades, Trades Union Congress, areas of the National Union of Mineworkers, the People's March for Jobs, the International Brigade, Greater London Council Peace Year, National Council for Civil Liberties, Campaign for Nuclear Disarmament, and the Greenham Common women's campaign.

Kenton had two children and two granddaughters.

=== Spanish passport ===
On 26 May 2009 it was announced that seven British pensioners were to be awarded Spanish passports at the Spanish Embassy in London on 9 June 2009. Kenton, then aged 101, was the eldest of them.
