= Michael Siegal =

Michael Siegal (March 30, 1950 – February 20, 2012) was a developmental psychologist and cognitive scientist who was Marie Curie Chair in Psychology at the University of Trieste, Italy, and also a Professor of Psychology at the University of Sheffield, UK.

His empirical research sought to determine how access to language, language acquisition, and participation in conversation influence cognitive processes in development and their breakdown in adulthood following brain injury, especially in the areas of numerical, spatial, social, and moral cognition. This work was carried out in different cultures and involves monolingual and bilingual children, atypically developing children such as deaf children, and children and adults with aphasia.

Having completed his D. Phil. at the University of Oxford, he worked as an academic at the University of Queensland from 1979 to 1997.

== Selected bibliography ==
- Fairness in Children (Academic Press, 1982)
- Children, Parenthood, and Social Welfare in the Context of Developmental Psychology (Oxford University Press, 1985)
- Knowing Children (Lawrence Erlbaum Associates, 1991)
- Children's Understanding of Biology and Health with Candida Peterson (Cambridge University Press, 1999)
- The Cognitive Basis of Science with Peter Carruthers and Stephen Stich (Cambridge University Press, 2002)
- Marvelous Minds: The Discovery of What Children Know. (Oxford University Press, 2008)
- Access to Language and Cognitive Development. with Luca Surian (Oxford University Press, 2011) ISBN 9780199592722
