= Dennis Greenland =

British soil scientist

Dennis James Greenland FRS (13 June 1930 – 23 December 2012) was a British soil scientist, and was honorary visiting professor at the University of Reading.

== Life ==
Greenland studied at Portsmouth Grammar School before earning a Ph.D. degree at Christ Church, Oxford in 1954 with his thesis titled The interaction of montmoril-lonite with some organic compounds. He was a lecturer at the University of Ghana. He was director of research at the International Institute of Tropical Agriculture. He was deputy director general of the International Rice Research Institute. He taught at the University of Reading from 1988.

== Works ==
- D J Greenland, P H Nye, The Soil Under Shifting Cultivation 1960
- Cherish the Earth FAO, 1994
- The Sustainability of Rice Farming CABI, January 4, 1997, ISBN 978-0-85199-163-4
