= A.M. Parkin =

English artist

- Born: Anthony Montague Parkin; 15 August 1943; Kemsing, Kent
- Died: 11 June 2012, Age 68; Dartford, Kent
- Education: Beckenham School of Art (BSoA), Ravensbourne College of Art
- Known for: Painting, Etching, Drawing
- Movement: neo-Romanticism, Realism, Surrealism
- Website: www.montyparkin.co.uk

Anthony Montague Parkin (1943–2012, also known as A.M. Parkin, Tony Parkin, Monty Parkin) was an English artist known for his drawings, engravings and watercolours depicting daily life and nature in his home village of Kemsing, Kent.

== Life and work ==
Parkin was born on 15 August 1943 in Kemsing, Kent. He studied at Beckenham School of Art and Ravensbourne College of Art. He preferred representational drawing to the in-vogue preference for abstract art.

Graham Sutherland sponsored A.M. Parkin's 1977 solo exhibition at the Langton Gallery in Chelsea, saying:

"When first I saw the work of A. M. Parkin six or seven years ago, I was struck at the outset by the fact that here was someone using his eyes acutely in his chosen field with obsessive attention ....Any collector of prints...would do well to start a collection of these mysterious works – so full of understanding of quiet places".

In 1978, Parkin was chosen, by Quentin Crisp, as the winner of a drawing competition (Parkin had submitted an etching of Crisp) and the prize giving was broadcast on television.

During a career spanning nearly five decades, A.M. Parkin was commissioned by the likes of Victor Lownes and Langton Iliffe, 2nd Baron Iliffe.

The latter was attracted to Parkin's intricate pencil drawing style, commissioning the artist to produce a study of 'The Elm at Yattendon' in Berkshire, while Lownes commissioned a pencil drawing of Stocks House in Hertfordshire.

In September 1981, Parkin's set of pencil drawings called 'Village People' featured on BBC Radio Four's 'Countryside in September' programme. The portraits appear in A.M. Parkin's retrospective book 'A Village Artist'.

Parkin's work has been exhibited at galleries including the Royal Academy and The Mall Galleries in London. His 1985 engraving of Quentin Crisp is held at London's National Portrait Gallery.

He produced a series of political postcards in the late 1980s, galvanised by opposition to Margaret Thatcher's Poll Tax. Parkin refused to pay his poll tax, was taken to court, then sold the postcards at £1 apiece to pay off his court costs.

In 2011, Parkin took part in the Discerning Eye exhibition at the invitation of art critic Brian Sewell.

In January 2012, The Illustration Cupboard presented a collection of Parkin's original artwork for the Margaret Thatcher satirical postcards of the 1980s, including the internationally recognised "Market Forces' Sweetheart", which had been voted top political postcard of 1989 by collectors.

Parkin died on 11 June 2012, having just completed a retrospective book of his life's work.

A charitable trust to support student artists has been created by A.M. Parkin's family. The first winners of this prize are: Afsaneh Navidinia (Goldsmiths University, London), Evelyn Kitt (Ruskin School of Drawing and Fine Art, Oxford), Laura Coats (York St John University, York).
