= Christopher Allen (cricketer) =

English cricketer (1944–2012)

Personal information
- Full name: Christopher Wynyard Allen
- Born: 7 May 1944; Southampton, Hampshire, England
- Died: 18 October 2012 (aged 68); England
- Nickname: Cal
- Batting: Right-handed
- Bowling: Slow left-arm orthodox

Domestic team information
- Years: Team
- 1976–1983: Dorset

Career statistics
Competition	List A
Matches	1
Runs scored	7
Batting average	7.00
100s/50s	–/–
Top score	7
Balls bowled	36
Wickets	–
Bowling average	–
5 wickets in innings	–
10 wickets in match	–
Best bowling	–
Catches/stumpings	1/–
- Source: Cricinfo, 9 December 2012

Christopher Wynyard Allen (7 May 1944 – 18 October 2012) was an English first-class cricketer. Allen was a right-handed batsman who bowled slow left-arm orthodox. He was born at Southampton, Hampshire.

Allen moved to Lymington, Hampshire in 1964, when his parents took over The Mayflower pub in the town. Shortly after moving there, he began playing for Lymington Cricket Club, where he was initially encouraged to be a seam bowler. While bowling slow left-arm orthodox in the nets at the County Ground, Southampton, he was spotted by Arthur Holt who encouraged him to stick with that bowling style. Having impressed in club cricket for Lymington, Allen briefly played for the Hampshire Second XI, before being selected to play minor counties cricket for Dorset, making his debut for the county in the 1976 Minor Counties Championship against Cornwall. From 1976 to 1983, Allen played a total of 66 Minor Counties Championship matches, the last of which came against Shropshire. He also made a single appearance for the county in the 1983 MCCA Knockout Trophy against Oxfordshire. He took a total of 252 wickets for Dorset. Allen also made a sole List A appearance for Dorset in the 1983 NatWest Trophy against first-class opponents Essex at Dean Park, Bournemouth. In Dorset's innings 111 all out, Allen was dismissed for 7 runs by Neil Foster, while in Essex's innings he bowled 6 wicketless overs and caught Keith Fletcher, with Essex winning by 7 wickets.

In club cricket, he took a total of 253 wickets in the Southern League for Lymington and the Southampton-based Deanery Cricket Club, as well as hundreds more in friendly matches across Hampshire. He went on to become the eighth leading wicket taker in the Southern League. He played a key role in Lymington's victory in the Southern league, taking 32 wickets. He also fulfilled the roles of Lymington captain, chairman and fixture secretary. He died on 18 October 2012, following a battle with bowel cancer.
