= Peter David (journalist) =

- Born: Peter Howard David; September 7, 1951; Johannesburg, South Africa
- Died: May 10, 2012 (aged 60); Charlottesville, Virginia
- Education: University of London
- Occupations: Journalist, writer (The Economist Washington bureau chief)
- Spouse: Celia Binns
- Children: 2
- Writing career
- Period: 1972–2012

Peter David (September 7, 1951 – May 10, 2012) was the Washington bureau chief and primary U.S. political correspondent for The Economist, the U.K.-based weekly magazine, with which he worked for his last 28 years. He supervised coverage of the Persian Gulf War in the early 1990s and became the magazine's foreign editor from 2002 to 2009, covering the War in Afghanistan and the Iraq War. David also previously authored the "Bagehot" column on British politics, before finally moving to the U.S. to author the "Lexington" column on American politics.

== Early years ==
Peter David was born in Johannesburg, South Africa to a family of Lithuanian Jews who had settled in South Africa decades earlier to escape pogroms. His father was a lawyer and his mother was a left-wing political activist who fought against the apartheid government. After the Sharpeville massacre there in 1960, where 69 people were killed by police, she feared arrest and the family relocated to London within days. They eventually settled in Liverpool.

After graduating from the University of London in 1972, where he studied sociology, he took jobs as a journalist for various magazines, among those were journals covering house plants and UFOs.

== Career ==
David became the Washington bureau chief for Nature, the world's most cited journal on science. In 1984 he then joined The Economist as a science writer. He soon became the magazine's "main authority" on the Middle East while also writing the Bagehot column covering British politics and running its business sections. Later, he became its foreign editor for international topics, acting as "editorial manager and senior writer."

"People tend to think in black and white. America is either in decline or it is ordained to be for ever the world’s greatest nation. Government is either paralyzed or it is running amok, stifling liberty and enterprise and snuffing out the American dream. The election campaign accentuates the negative and sharpens this binary illusion." Peter David (quoted from his last column)

According to his friend Clive Crook, senior editor of The Atlantic, "he was respected for his knowledge. As a boss he was known for his kindness and generosity, as a writer for his wit, even-handedness and unaffected elegance," noting that "David was a superb journalist, one of the best The Economist ever hired. His range was stunning"

An editorial in The Economist describes his columns as models "of mind-clearing prose," noting that "his forte was to stride fearlessly across minefields of ideas." Despite the partisanship displayed in American politics, especially before elections, he remained optimistic about the country's future, referring to such partisan politics as a "binary illusion."

Crook summarizes some of David's personal traits:

He was a brilliant man—but also wise, a rare combination. In argument, he was razor sharp, yet gentle. Gentleness was his most salient trait. He had no taste for stamping on opponents he had defeated. He would sometimes win arguments almost imperceptibly, guiding his challenger to the right answer. He took his work most seriously, worried about it more than he let on, and thought it mattered to be right, yet always took himself unseriously. He was funny, specializing in jokes at his own expense. The result of these perfectly balanced contrasts was a completely irresistible man. He was the least demanding and most rewarding of friends. He never tried to charm, but never failed to. Everyone he met thought he was wonderful, and they were right.

For the last three years before his death, he was the magazine's Washington bureau chief covering U.S. politics and authored the "prestigious" Lexington column. The Economist describes his contributions:

Above all, though, he brought to journalism a rare elegance of spirit. In tackling really hard questions, he carefully weighed opposing arguments before the application of reason, guided by strong liberal instincts, led him to a crisp conclusion.

== Death ==
He died in a car accident while he and his wife were being driven back to their hotel after a speaking engagement with the Charlottesville Committee on Foreign Relations. His was the only fatality, caused by the car being rear-ended on Virginia's Interstate 64. The driver responsible for the crash was sentenced to a year imprisonment for manslaughter. He is survived by his wife of 34 years, Celia Binns, and two children, Ian David and Tessa David. He also has a sister and brother.
