= Cassandra Jardine =

British journalist

- Born: Cassandra Caroline Mary Jardine; 16 November 1954
- Died: 29 May 2012 (aged 57)
- Education: Newnham College
- Occupation: Journalist
- Employer: The Daily Telegraph

Cassandra Caroline Mary Jardine (16 November 1954 – 29 May 2012) was a British journalist, best known as a contributor to The Daily Telegraph over a twenty-year period.

== Life ==
Born in London, the youngest of three daughters, her parents were Anne, a Conservative councillor in Kensington and Chelsea, and Christopher Jardine, a civil servant. In 1972, as the Under Secretary at the Department of Trade and Industry, although later "vindicated", her father was accused of "negligence" after a car insurance company collapsed. Cassandra Jardine was educated at the Godolphin and Latymer School and read English at Newnham College, Cambridge.

After Jardine graduated from Cambridge University in 1976, she became an assistant to The Daily Telegraph contributor T.E. Utley and later spent a period working for Cosmopolitan, Unilever's internal publication and Business magazine. She returned to The Daily Telegraph on 29 March 1989 as a feature writer and interviewed several hundred public figures over the next two decades before latterly writing about health for the newspaper.

She was diagnosed with lung cancer in July 2010, specifically adenocarcinoma. She began to write about her illness, and won the Lung Cancer Journalism award in 2011, and the Excellence in Oncology award in the same year. She wrote two books about parenting: How to be a Better Parent: No Matter How Badly Your Children Behave or How Busy You Are (2003); and Positive Not Pushy: How to Make the Most of Your Child’s Potential (2005).

Jardine was married to the actor William Chubb; the couple had five children, two sons and three daughters who were aged between 13 and 22 at the time she died.

The Daily Telegraph has founded the annual Cassandra Jardine Prize for young women journalists in her honour.
