= Roy Miles =

English art dealer (1935-2012)

- Born: 9 February 1935; Liverpool
- Died: 10 December 2012 (aged 77)
- Occupation: art dealer

Roy Miles (9 February 1935 – 10 December 2012) was a London art dealer who was one of the first dealers to recognise the commercial potential of the art of the former Soviet bloc.

Born Roy Marsh in Liverpool, Roy took his step-father's name of Miles and moved to London at an early age to work for an antique dealer. He quickly changed to hairdressing and owned a salon in London's West End. In the late 1960s he began in business as an art dealer.

Miles specialised first in British Victorian art and later toured the former Soviet Union buying Socialist Realist art that he sold for a huge markup. In the 1970s and 80s he was able to capitalise on the rising status of London as an art centre and his innate entrepreneurial skills and flair for self-publicity. Miles' parties at his various galleries became legendary social events, and Miles was associated with names such as Rudolf Nureyev, Edward Heath, Lord Forte, Raine Spencer, Ossie Clark, the Duke of Devonshire and Jonathan Aitken.

== Publications ==
- Priceless: The Memoirs and Mysteries of Britain's No. 1 Art Dealer. London, Metro, 2003. ISBN 1843580659
