= Leo Kersley =

British ballet dancer

Leo Kersley (30 May 1920 – 3 July 2012) was a British dancer and teacher. Kersley was a founding member of the Sadler's Wells Theatre Ballet and was influential in classical ballet in the Netherlands.
