= Ian Buist =

British diplomat

John Latto Farquharson Buist CB (30 May 1930 – 27 October 2012), known as Ian Buist, was a British diplomat who worked in Kenya and East Africa during the 1950s, as well as being a member of the British High Commission. From 1976 to 1990, Buist was an Under Secretary in the Foreign and Commonwealth Office's Overseas Development Administration.

After his retirement, Buist responded to comments in the press regarding post-colonial Kenyan development.

== Personal background ==
Buist was born to Lieutenant-Colonel Thomas Powrie Buist RAMC, an Army doctor, and Christian Mary Buist, both from Dundee. In a 2008 interview with Malcolm McBain, Buist described his grandfather, Robert Cochrane Buist, as "a brilliant mathematician, physician and obstetrician, but he subscribed to every rebel cause that he could. He was an early socialist, an atheist, a vegetarian, a eugenicist, and a promoter of Dundee's now heavily-used crematorium".

Buist was a scholar of Winchester College. He was called up for national service, but his eyesight was too poor and he was rejected on medical grounds: instead he studied at New College, Oxford, from 1948 to 1952 and got an congratulatory First in Classics.

Buist was a campaigner for gay rights and joined the Campaign for Homosexual Equality (CHE) in 1972, which he saw as a less radical alternative to the Gay Liberation Front: Buist said their "idea of an anti-family, anti-Establishment social revolution seemed to me unlikely to produce change for the better". Despite being gay, Buist passed the "positive vetting" or PV process used in the Civil Service following the change of the law on homosexuality in 1967. It took until 1991 for the government to remove the automatic bar on security clearance for LGBT people. Buist's work with the CHE is part of the Hall–Carpenter Archives at the London School of Economics.

After his retirement, Buist wrote letters to The Guardian criticising the Church of England's attitudes to same-sex civil partnerships and defending Peter Mandelson against homophobic attacks in the press following the events that led to Mandelson's resignation in January 2001.
