= Eleutherios Katsaitis =

Greek bishop

Eleftherios Katsaitis (Greek: Ελευθέριος Κατσαΐτης; 1929 – 6 January 2012) was bishop of Constantinople Orthodox Church, titular bishop of Nyssa.

He was ordained a deacon in 1951 and a presbyter in 1956. On 6 February 1987 he was consecrated titular Bishop of Nyssa and auxiliary bishop in the Greek Orthodox Archdiocese of Thyateira and Great Britain, a position he held until 1994. He retired in 1994 and returned to Greece.

He was smothered to death at his home in Athens on 6 January 2012. There were not signs of forced entry so the police suspects that the bishop knew his murderer.
