= Steven Rawlings =

British astrophysicist

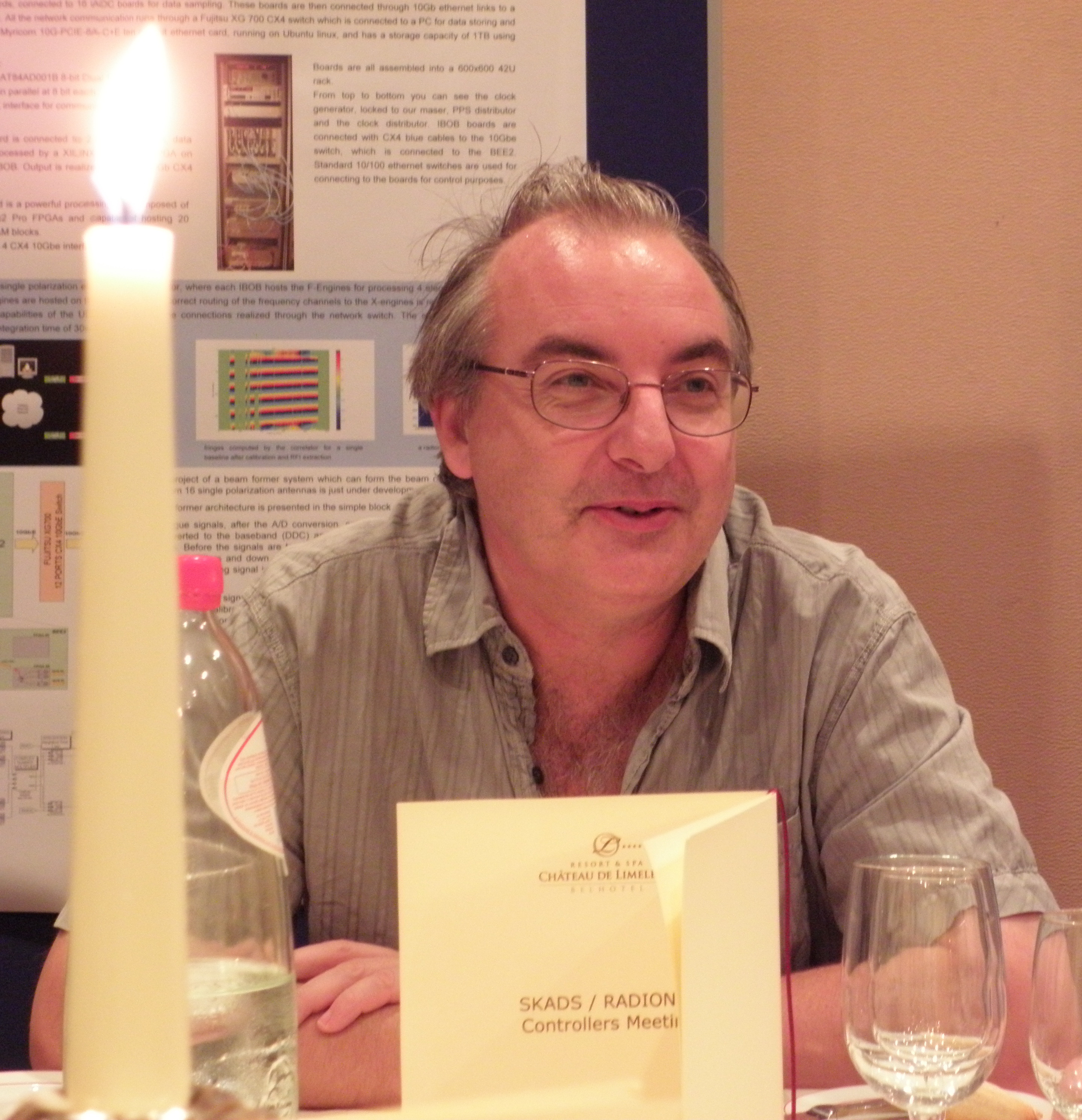
- At the SKADS Conference in Limelette, Belgium, 4 November 2009
- Born: 11 October 1961
- Died: 11 January 2012 (aged 50)
- Education: St. John's College, Cambridge (B.A., PhD)

Steven Gregory Rawlings (11 October 1961 – 11 January 2012) was a British astrophysicist at the University of Oxford, where he held a professorship in astrophysics and a fellowship at St Peter's College. He studied physics and theoretical physics at St John's College, Cambridge and received his PhD in radio astronomy in 1988. He was one of the lead scientists in the Square Kilometre Array project.

On 11 January 2012, Rawlings died at the Southmoor home of close friend and colleague Dr Devinder Sivia, a lecturer in mathematics for the sciences at St John's College. Sivia said that Rawlings, who had been receiving treatment for unspecified mental health issues, began to physically attack him, and Sivia held him in a headlock to restrain him; Rawlings died from a heart attack shortly thereafter. The coroner recorded a verdict of accidental death. Sivia and Rawlings co-wrote the book Foundations of Science Mathematics, published in 1999 by Oxford University Press.

On 27 August 2013, the LOFAR radio telescope station at Chilbolton Observatory was named The Rawlings Array in his honour.
