= Maddalena Fagandini =

English musician and television producer (1929–2012)

- Born: Madeleine Margaret Anne Fagandini; 30 August 1929; Hendon, London, United Kingdom
- Died: 29 November 2012 (aged 83) New Malden, London, United Kingdom
- Genre: Electronic music
- Occupations: Composer, electronic musician, television producer
- Instrument: Musique concrète
- Years active: 1953–1987

Maddalena Fagandini (30 August 1929 – 29 November 2012) was an English electronic musician and television producer. She was employed by the BBC in the early 1950s, as part of their Italian Service, before becoming part of the pioneering BBC Radiophonic Workshop in 1959. Her work with the Radiophonic Workshop involved creating jingles and interval signals, using musique concrète techniques, for BBC radio and television. She had an important role to play in the coverage of the 1960 Olympics in Rome, due to her bilingual fluency in English and Italian. In 1962 Fagandini collaborated with Parlophone record producer George Martin to create two electronic singles, "Time Beat" and "Waltz in Orbit", which were released as recordings by the pseudonymous Ray Cathode. The recordings were made a few weeks before Martin met The Beatles.

She left the Workshop in 1966, following the introduction of synthesisers, to become a television producer and director, working particularly in the field of language teaching. The first such series, Parliamo Italiano in 1963, was very successful. It was followed by further series, often combining both radio and television programmes, teaching Italian (Conversazioni in 1977 and Buongiorno Italia in 1982/3), Spanish (Dígame in 1978) and German (Kontakte in 1971 and Deutsch Direkt in 1985). Maddalena also produced two television series of The Devil's Music, a historical exploration of black American Blues music, in 1976 and 1979, and one television series of Mediterranean Cookery in 1987. She was also the film director for the BBC Schools Look and Read story "The Boy from Space" in 1971 (re-shown in 1980 in colour).
