= Peter Clarke (cartoonist) =

British cartoonist (1935–2012)

Peter Clarke (18 September 1935 – 16 December 2012) was a British cartoonist. Clarke's caricatures, described by one critic as “wicked perversions”, appeared in The Guardian newspaper where he was the staff cartoonist.

== Information ==
Clarke wrote and illustrated the best seller Touchdown on the Moon, an account of the Apollo 11 Moon landing which sold 1.3 million copies in three languages. Clarke was the youngest (26 y.o.) political cartoonist ever appointed to a national newspaper in the UK. Skilled in conventional pen and ink technique, he also worked in other media. Clarke introduced the Apple Macintosh Graphics computer into The Guardian.

He exhibited in many modern art exhibitions in the UK and abroad, including the John Moores Biennial, Britain's pre-eminent, competitive show of modern painting. Clarke was also commissioned by the Zambian Government to paint an official portrait of President Kenneth Kaunda.

Clarke appeared on TV on The Late Show and as a writer and presenter of What The Papers Say. He won the cartoonists "Oscar", the prestigious title of "Cartoonist of the Year", a title only awarded to eleven cartoonists in the forty-year history of the press awards.

Married with four children, he died on 16 December 2012 in Norfolk, England, United Kingdom.
