= Maria Petrou =

Greek-born British AI researcher (1953–2012)

- Μαρία Πέτρου
- Born: 17 May 1953; Thessaloniki, Greece
- Died: 15 October 2012 (aged 59); Thessaloniki, Greece
- Education: Aristotle University of Thessaloniki; University of Cambridge
- Occupations: Professor of Image Analysis, University of Surrey (1998–2005); Chair of Signal Processing, Imperial College London (2006–2012)
- Known for: Artificial intelligence research
- Spouse: Phil L. Palmer

Maria Petrou FREng (Greek: Μαρία Πέτρου; 17 May 1953 – 15 October 2012) was a Greek-born British scientist who specialised in the fields of artificial intelligence and machine vision. She developed a number of novel image recognition techniques, taught at Surrey University and Imperial College London, and was a prolific author of scientific articles.

== Early life and education ==
Petrou was born in Thessaloniki, Greece, in 1953, and displayed an aptitude for science from an early age. She began tutoring children in maths and science at the age of 15. She studied physics at the Aristotle University of Thessaloniki, before travelling to the United Kingdom to study mathematics and astronomy at the University of Cambridge. In 1983, Petrou began working as a postdoctoral research assistant at Oxford University's Department of Theoretical Physics.

== Artificial intelligence research ==
As British academia gained a more practical focus in the 1980s, Petrou began to study machine vision and other aspects of robotic intelligence. In 1988, she started work at the University of Surrey's Department of Electronic and Electrical Engineering, becoming its Professor of Image Analysis in 1998. She later held the Chair of Signal Processing at Imperial College London, and was the Director of the Informatics and Telematics Institute at Greece's Centre for Research and Technology (CERTH) from 2009 until her death. Petrou was furthermore elected a Fellow of the Royal Academy of Engineering, authored several books, and was a prolific contributor to scientific journals.

During her career, Petrou developed a number of important image recognition techniques, including methods for robotic texture analysis, image comparison and 3D measurement. Most notably, she and Dr Alexander Kadyrov co-invented the trace transform, a method of image representation that allows for more efficient facial recognition systems. Technologies based on Petrou's work have had numerous applications in commerce, medicine and environmental imaging. She was also an amateur cartoonist, and once challenged her colleagues to construct a robot capable of ironing clothes – a challenge that later developed into a European Union-funded robotics project.

== Personal life ==
Petrou married Phil L. Palmer, a British astronomer, with whom she had one son before divorcing. She died of cancer in October 2012, aged 59.
