= David Lomon =

- Born: David Lomon; 31 December 1917; Hackney, London, England
- Died: 21 December 2012 (aged 94); Slough, Berkshire
- Occupation: Textiles
- Known for: Last known UK-based survivor of the International Brigade during Spanish Civil War

David Lomon (31 December 1917 – 21 December 2012) was the last known UK-based survivor of a 2,500 strong army of Britons who fought with left-wing forces against General Franco's Nationalists in the Spanish Civil War.

The only known British survivor of the International Brigades to outlive Lomon was Stan Hilton, who died in 2016.

== Biography ==
Born in Hackney, London, Lomon was a 19-year-old rag-and-bone man when he signed up to join the International Brigade in secret in 1936 following a clash with Oswald Mosley's fascist group the Blackshirts at the Battle of Cable Street. After expressing an initial interest at a London office, the Young Communist League member was tested for his suitability for the Brigade in Paris. In December 1937 he travelled through to France and into Spain via the Pyrenees at night, avoiding Franco's border guards. He then joined the British Battalion of the 15th International Brigade.

He fought on the Republican side in the two-month Battle of Teruel and in the Aragon Offensive where the Republican side faced the might of Franco's forces which were bolstered by more than 100,000 extra troops supplied by Italian dictator Benito Mussolini.

Lomon was captured by Italian forces on 31 March 1938 during fighting in Aragon and was taken to the crowded prisoner-of-war camp at the Monastery of San Pedro de Cardeñas near Burgos in northern Spain. He survived brutal beatings, a lack of medical facilities and a starvation diet. He was eventually exchanged for Italian prisoners-of-war held captive in Britain in October 1938.

Amongst the British members of the International Brigade that Lomon fought alongside were the trade union leader Jack Jones and writers George Orwell and Laurie Lee.

In World War II, Lomon joined the Royal Navy. He eventually returned to Bourne End, Buckinghamshire, and worked in the textile trade.

== International Brigade veteran ==
Lomom attended many ceremonies of the veterans of the International Brigade, including the unveiling of a volunteers' memorial on London's South Bank in the Spring of 2011.

He died in Slough, Berkshire aged 94.
