= John Josephs =

English cricketer

Personal information
- Full name: John Michael Josephs
- Born: 16 January 1924; Hendon, Middlesex, England
- Died: 25 December 2012 (aged 88)
- Height: 5 ft 11 in (1.80 m)
- Batting: Right-handed
- Bowling: Slow left-arm orthodox

Domestic team information
- Years: Team
- 1946–1953: Leicestershire

Career statistics
Competition	First-class
Matches	9
Runs scored	166
Batting average	9.66
100s/50s	–/–
Top score	25*
Balls bowled	144
Wickets	1
Bowling average	86.00
5 wickets in innings	–
10 wickets in match	–
Best bowling	1/21
Catches/stumpings	1/–
- Source: Cricinfo, 26 February 2012

John Michael Josephs (16 January 1924 – 25 December 2012) was an English cricketer. Josephs was a right-handed batsman who bowled slow left-arm orthodox. He was born at Hendon, Middlesex, and was educated at Clifton College.

Josephs made his first-class debut for Leicestershire against Oxford University in 1946. He made eight further first-class appearances for the county, the last of which came against Northamptonshire in the 1953 County Championship. In his nine first-class appearances, Josephs scored 116 runs at an average of 9.66, with a high score of 25 not out. With the ball, he took just a single wicket at an overall cost of 86 runs. Josephs died peacefully at home on Christmas Day 2012.
