= Eric Burgin =

English cricketer & footballer (1924–2012)

Personal information
- Full name: Eric Burgin
- Date of birth: 4 January 1924
- Place of birth: Pitsmoor, England
- Date of death: 16 November 2012 (aged 88)
- Place of death: Sheffield, England
- Height: 6 ft 1 1/2 in (1.87 m)
- Position: Half back

Senior career*
Years	Team	Apps	(Gls)
1946–1949	Sheffield United	0	(0)
1949–1951	York City	23	(0)
- * Club domestic league appearances and goals

Eric Burgin (4 January 1924 – 16 November 2012) was an English first-class cricketer and a professional footballer.

== Career ==
Born in Pitsmoor, Sheffield, West Riding of Yorkshire, Burgin was a right arm medium pacer who played 12 matches for Yorkshire County Cricket Club in 1952 and 1953. He took 31 wickets at an average of 25.64, with a best of 6 for 43 against Surrey. A right-handed lower order bat, he scored 92 runs at 13.14, with a top score of 32 made against Middlesex. Burgin died in November 2012 in Sheffield, aged 88.

Burgin also played professional football; he signed for Sheffield United in December 1946 and played for their reserve team in the Central League. He joined Third Division North club York City in May 1949 and competed with Alan Stewart for the centre half spot in the team. He made 23 appearances before injury forced him to retire in August 1951.
