= Jim Galley =

English cricketer

Personal information
- Full name: James Martyn Galley
- Born: 4 October 1944; Bristol, England
- Died: 4 October 2012 (aged 68); Bath, Somerset, England
- Batting: Right-handed
- Role: Batsman

Domestic team information
- Years: Team
- 1969: Somerset
- FC debut: 16 August 1969 Somerset v Yorkshire
- Last FC: 12 September 1969 Somerset v Kent
- Only LA: 17 August 1969 Somerset v Derbyshire

Career statistics
Competition	First-class	List A
Matches	3	1
Runs scored	27	8
Batting average	5.40	8.00
100s/50s	0/0	0/0
Top score	17	8
Catches/stumpings	1/–	0/–
- Source: CricketArchive, 31 December 2009

James Martyn Galley (4 October 1944 – 4 October 2012) played first-class cricket for Somerset in three matches in the 1969 season. He also played in one List A match for Somerset.

Galley was a right-handed middle-order batsman. He played for Somerset's second eleven as a batsman from 1964 to 1973 in the Second Eleven Championship and Minor Counties Championship. His only first-class and List A appearances for the Somerset first team came towards the end of the 1969 season, in which Somerset finished at the bottom of the County Championship for the first time since 1955. Galley featured prominently in a close finish in his first match, against Yorkshire at Headingley, when he and Roy Palmer played out 15 overs from Test bowlers Don Wilson and Geoff Cope without scoring to save the match. But overall, he had little success, making just 27 runs in six innings, with a top score of 17 in his final first-class match against Kent.

Galley reappeared in Minor Counties cricket with Wiltshire in 1980.

Galley was also a well-known rugby union player, appearing at scrum-half for Bath and Somerset.

Galley died at Bath on 4 October 2012.
