= Douglas Hamilton (journalist) =

Douglas Hamilton (4 March 1947 – 24 December 2012) was a Reuters foreign correspondent.

Douglas Matthew Hamilton was born in Fife, Scotland. A dual Canadian-British citizen, he was known for his writing on the fall of the Berlin Wall, and regime changes in Czechoslovakia and Romania, the breakup and wars of succession of Yugoslavia, the rise and fall of dictators in Africa and the effects of the 2009 Israeli offensive on Gaza. His assignments included reporting from the Bosnia, Croatia and Kosovo wars, from behind the scenes at the EU and NATO and from the front lines of the Iraq, Lebanon, Libya and Syria conflicts.

In November 2012 Hamilton reported on the missile attacks on Tel Aviv, and the 2012 Tel Aviv bus bombing.

He drowned while taking his daily swim in the Mediterranean Sea, off the coast of Tel Aviv.
