= Jack Hirst (rugby league, born c. 1936) =

English rugby league footballer

Personal information
- Full name: John Hirst
- Born: circa-1936
- Died: 19 October 2012 (aged 76); Pinderfields Hospital, Wakefield, West Yorkshire, England

Playing information
- Position: Prop
Club
Years	Team	Pld	T	G	FG	P
1955–56	Hunslet	7	1	0	0	3
1957–65	Castleford	181	7	3	0	27
1965–66	Bradford Northern	15	1	0	0	3
1969	Wakefield Trinity	4	0			0
	Bramley
	Total	207	9	3	0	33
Representative
Years	Team	Pld	T	G	FG	P
1963	Yorkshire	1	1	0	0	3

John "Jack" Hirst (c. 1936 – 19 October 2012 in Wakefield) was a professional rugby league footballer who played in the 1950s and 1960s. He played at representative level for Yorkshire, and at club level for Hunslet, Castleford, Wakefield Trinity, Bradford Northern, Bramley and Oulton Miners Welfare (now named Oulton Raiders) as a prop.

== Playing career ==
=== County honours ===
Jack Hirst won a cap playing at prop for Yorkshire while at Castleford scoring 1-try in the 20-45 defeat by Lancashire at St. Helens' stadium on 11 September 1963.

=== County League appearances ===
Jack Hirst played in Castleford's victory in the Yorkshire League during the 1964–65 season.

== Personal life ==
Jack Hirst was the father of the rugby league footballer for Hunslet, Keighley, Huddersfield and Oulton Raiders, John Hirst (not to be confused with rugby league footballer who played in the 1980s and 1990s for Wakefield Trinity, John Hirst).
