= David Axon =

British astrophysicist (1951–2012)

David John Axon
- Born: 1951; Doncaster, South Yorkshire, England
- Died: 5 April 2012 (aged 61)
- Education: University of Durham (BSc, PhD)
- Scientific career
- Fields: Astronomy
- Workplaces: Rochester Institute of Technology; University of Hertfordshire; Space Telescope Science Institute; Jodrell Bank Observatory; University of Manchester; University of Sussex
- Thesis: The optical polarization of M82 and the local spiral arm (1977)
- Doctoral advisor: Arnold Wolfendale

David John Axon (1951 – 5 April 2012) was a British astrophysicist whose research focused on astronomical polarimetry and active galactic nuclei.

He held professorships at the University of Hertfordshire and the Rochester Institute of Technology (RIT), and at the time of his death was head of the School of Mathematical and Physical Sciences at the University of Sussex.

== Early life and education ==
Axon was born in Doncaster in 1951 to an English father and Welsh mother. He studied theoretical physics at Durham University, where he was a member of Hatfield College and graduated with a BSc in 1972.

He remained at Durham to undertake a PhD under the supervision of Arnold Wolfendale, which he completed in 1977.

== Career and research ==
Following his doctorate, Axon held research fellowships at the University of Sussex, University College London and the Institute of Astronomy at the University of Cambridge.

In 1983, Axon was appointed a lecturer in physics at the University of Manchester, conducting his research at the Nuffield Radio Astronomy Laboratory at Jodrell Bank Observatory. In 1993, he took leave from Manchester to join the Space Telescope Science Institute in Baltimore, where he served as instrument scientist for the Near Infrared Camera and Multi-Object Spectrometer (NICMOS) aboard the Hubble Space Telescope. He returned to Manchester in 1998.

The following year, Axon was appointed professor and head of the Department of Physical Sciences at the University of Hertfordshire. In 2002, he moved to RIT as professor and chair of its Department of Physics, a position he held until 2008. He subsequently remained at RIT as a research professor. In 2009, he returned to the United Kingdom as head of the School of Mathematical and Physical Sciences at the University of Sussex, while continuing his research affiliation with RIT.

Axon's research centred on astronomical polarimetry and the structure and evolution of active galactic nuclei. His early work included the identification of an X-ray-selected BL Lacertae object.

With Keith Taylor, Axon studied the large-scale outflow from M82, identifying what became known as a galactic superwind. He also contributed to observations revealing large-scale magnetic fields in the outflow from the young stellar object T Tauri.

== Death ==
Axon died suddenly on 5 April 2012 while visiting RIT in Rochester, New York. He was survived by his wife, Lynne.

A two-day Royal Astronomical Society specialist meeting devoted to massive black holes in galaxies was held in his memory at the University of Sussex in April 2013.
