= David Edelsten =

English writer and British Army Brigadier

- Born: 13 March 1933; London, England
- Died: 2 February 2012 (aged 78); Dorset
- Military career
- Allegiance: United Kingdom
- Branch: British Army
- Service years: 1952–1987
- Rank: Brigadier
- Commands: 13th/18th Royal Hussars & 3rd Infantry Brigade (United Kingdom)
- Conflicts: Malayan Emergency & The Troubles
- Other work: Director of the Somerset Council on Alcohol and Drugs & writer

David Edelsten (13 March 1933 – 2 February 2012) was an English writer, British Army Brigadier and charity organizer.

== Biography ==
David Edelsten was the second son of Alan & Grace Edelsten. His father, a doctor, used a horse to visit patients. In 1952, after attending Clifton College, he attended Sandhurst and joined the 13th/18th Royal Hussars. He arrived with only his horse. He served in the Malayan Emergency and as a Major was in charge of training from 1966 to 1967. He was second in command of the 3rd Infantry Brigade during The Troubles and played weekly squash. He began writing in 1991 for twelve years with Country Life. He wrote six books and was a member of the Surtees Society.
