= List of Notts County F.C. players =

This is a list of notable footballers who have played for Notts County. The aim is for this list to include all players that have played 100 or more senior matches for the club. Other players who are deemed to have played an important role for the club can be included, but the reason for their notability should be included in the 'Notes' column.

Players should be listed in chronological order according to the year in which they first played for the club, and then by alphabetical order of their surname. Appearances and goals should be for first-team competitive games and include substitute appearances, but exclude wartime matches.

== List of players ==
Statistics are up to date as of 7 November 2026 Names in bold are currently active at the club.

Please help to expand this list.

Note: the source for the Career dates and Total apps/goals for a number of the below players is unclear and the reference used should be added.

Name	Position	Notts County career	League apps	League goals	Total apps	Total goals	Notes
Harry Daft	MF	1888–1894	137	58	168	81	
Harry Pennington	GK	1900–1904	126	0	?	?	
Percy Humphreys	MF	1901–1907	189	66	?	?	
Albert Iremonger	GK	1904–1926	564	0	?	?	Record league appearances
Teddy Emberton	MF	1904–1915	365	2	382	3	
Arthur Clamp	MF	1906–1915	275	3	289	?	
Bert Morley	DF	1907–1915	258	0	?	?	
Billy Flint	DF	1908–1926	376	40	408?	?	
William Ashurst	DF	1920–1926	200	0	?	?	
Tom Keetley	FW	1933	103	94	?	?	
Jackie Sewell	FW	1946–1951	178	97	195	104	
Tommy Lawton	FW	1947–1952	151	90	178	103	
Tom Johnston	MF	1948–1956	267	88	298	93	
Harry Noon	DF	1957–1961	122	0	123		
Tony Hateley	FW	1958–1963, 1970–1972	187	109	208		
Roy Horobin	FW	1958–1962	123	37	132	39	
Jeff Astle	FW	1959–1964	103	31	?	?	
Tony Bircumshaw	DF	1962–1966	148	1	?	?	
David Needham	DF	1965–1977	429	32	471	62	
Les Bradd	FW	1967–1978	395	125	442	137	Record league goalscorer
Don Masson	MF	1968–1982	403	92	455		
Brian Stubbs	DF	1968–1980	426	21	486	22	
Arthur Mann	DF	1972–1979	253	21	?	?	
Steve Carter	MF	1972–1978	188	21	?	?	
Tristan Benjamin	DF	1974–1987	311	4	?	?	
Pedro Richards	DF	1974–1986	399	5	485	6	
Ray O'Brien	DF	1974–1983	323	31	387	42	
Gordon Mair	MF	1976–1984	131	18	161	26	
Iain McCulloch	MF	1978–1984	215	51	?	?	
Trevor Christie	FW	1979–1984	187	63	203	79	
Raddy Avramovic	GK	1979–1983	149	0	164	0	
Brian Kilcline	DF	1980–1984	158	9	?	?	
Ian McParland	FW	1980–1989	221	69	266	90	
Rachid Harkouk	FW	1980–1986	144	39	170		
Dean Yates	DF	1985–1995	314	33	394	7	
Darren Davis	DF	1985–1988	92	1	111	2	
Chris Withe	DF	1987–1989	80	3	101	4	
Gary Mills	MF	1987–1989, 1994–1996	122	8	159	10	
Gary Lund	FW	1987–1995	?	?	315	79	
Don O'Riordan	MF	1988–1993	?	?	139	9	
Mark Draper	MF	1988–1994	?	?	270	49	
Craig Short	DF	1989–1992	?	?	158	10	Record transfer fee received (£2.5M)
Tommy Johnson	FW	1989–1992	?	?	149	57	
Charlie Palmer	MF	1989–1994	?	?	220	9	
Steve Cherry	GK	1989–1995	?	?	328	0	
Phil Turner	DF	1989–1996	?	?	304	22	
Phil Robinson	MF	1989–1992	?	?	174	12	
Chris Short	DF	1990–1995	?	?	115	3	
Tony Agana	FW	1991–1997	145	15	182	23	Record transfer fee paid (£685,000)
Michael Johnson	DF	1991–1995, 2008–2009	?	?	177	4	
Paul Devlin	MF	1992–1996, 1998	?	?	185	31	
Shaun Murphy	DF	1992–1996	?	?	135	7	
Andy Legg	MF	1993–1996	?	?	123	15	
Ian Baraclough	DF	1995–1998, 2001–2004	?	?	245	16	
Gary Strodder	DF	1995–1999	?	?	148	10	
Darren Ward	GK	1995–2001	?	?	302	0	
Matt Redmile	DF	1995–2001	?	?	173	8	
Gary Jones	FW	1996–1999	?	?	135	46	
Steve Finnan	DF	1996–1998	97	5	110	9	
Ian Richardson	MF	1996–2005	?	?	379	37	
Dennis Pearce	DF	1997–2001	?	?	141	3	
Andrew Hughes	MF	1998–2001	?	?	130	20	
Gary Owers	MF	1998–2002	?	?	180	14	
Richard Liburd	DF	1998–2002	?	?	175	11	
Michael Brough	MF	1998–2004	?	?	103	2	
Danny Allsopp	FW	1999–2003	?	?	123	55	
Nick Fenton	DF	1999–2004	?	?	192	12	
Paul Heffernan	FW	1999–2004	?	?	114	37	
Mark Stallard	FW	1999–2004, 2005	?	?	227	80	
Paul Bolland	MF	1999–2004	172	6	193	7	
Darren Caskey	MF	2001–2004	?	?	131	11	
Kevin Nicholson	DF	2001–2004	?	?	108	4	
Mike Edwards	DF	2004–2012; 2014–2018	312	27	343	30	
David Pipe	MF	2004–2007	?	?	154	4	
Kevin Pilkington	GK	2005–2010	141	0	149	0	
Stephen Hunt	DF	2006–2012	136	6	136	6	
John Thompson	DF	2008–2011	115	2	115	2	
Craig Westcarr	FW	2009–2011	87	21	104	25	
Neal Bishop	MF	2009–2013	168	11	168	11	
Lee Hughes	FW	2009–2013	128	59	146	66	
Alan Judge	MF	2010–2013	101	16	112	17	
Haydn Hollis	DF	2010–2018	118	7	137	8	
Alan Sheehan	DF	2011–2014; 2015–2016	128	11	142	12	
Curtis Thompson	MF	2011–2018	83	2	100	2	
Alan Smith	MF	2014–2018	87	0	107	1	
Jon Stead	FW	2015–2019	162	42	182	51	
Elliott Hewitt	MF	2015–2019	135	8	154	8	
Richard Duffy	DF	2016–2019	106	7	119	8	
Matt Tootle	DF	2016–2020	95	4	106	4	
Enzio Boldewijn	MF	2018–2021	116	20	128	22	
Kyle Wootton	FW	2019–2022	121	49	137	59	
Richard Brindley	DF	2019–2024	133	1	155	2	
Jim O'Brien	MF	2019–2024	156	16	167	17	
Connell Rawlinson	DF	2019–2024	145	3	168	5	
Sam Slocombe	GK	2019–2025	154	0	172	0	
Rúben Rodrigues	MF	2020–2023	125	51	139	54	
Adam Chicksen	DF	2020–2024	120	11	135	12	
Kyle Cameron	DF	2021–2024	117	8	127	8	
Aaron Nemane	MF	2021–2024	104	13	117	13	
**Matthew Palmer**	MF	2021–present	186	5	200	5	
Macaulay Langstaff	FW	2022–2024	93	70	97	71	Record number of league goals in a single season (42 in 2022-23)
Sam Austin	MF	2022–2025	112	10	124	16	
Jodi Jones	FW	2022–2026	123	21	129	22	
**Lewis Macari**	DF	2023–2026	91	1	101	1	
**Jacob Bedeau**	DF	2024–present	107	0	117	2	
