= Alevi history =

History of the Anatolian Sufi community

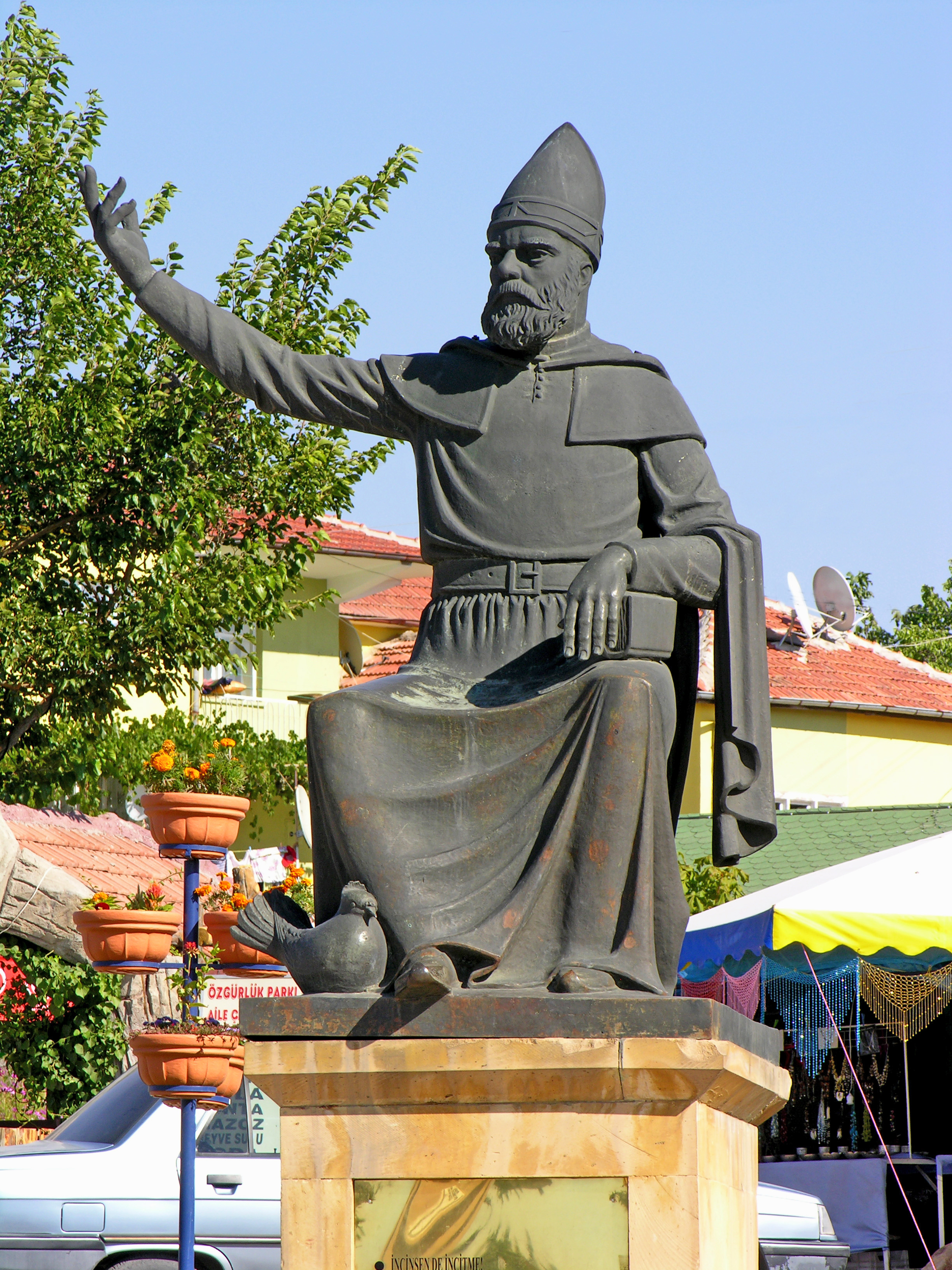
Statue of Haji Bektash Veli

The History of the Alevism is that of a heterodox, esoteric community found within Anatolia and neighboring regions.

== Medieval period ==
During the great Turkish expansion from Central Asia into Iran and Anatolia in the Seljuk period (11–12th centuries), Turkmen nomad tribes accepted a Sufi and pro-Ali form of Islam that co-existed with some of their pre-Islamic customs. These tribes dominated central and eastern Anatolia for centuries with their religious warriors (ghazi) spearheading the drive against Byzantines and Slavs. Many Armenians converted to Turkmen type Islam while retaining some Christian practices, and some observers believe that heterodox Armenian Christianity exerted a significant influence on the beliefs of the extremist Shi`ite sects.

=== Roots of Alevism ===
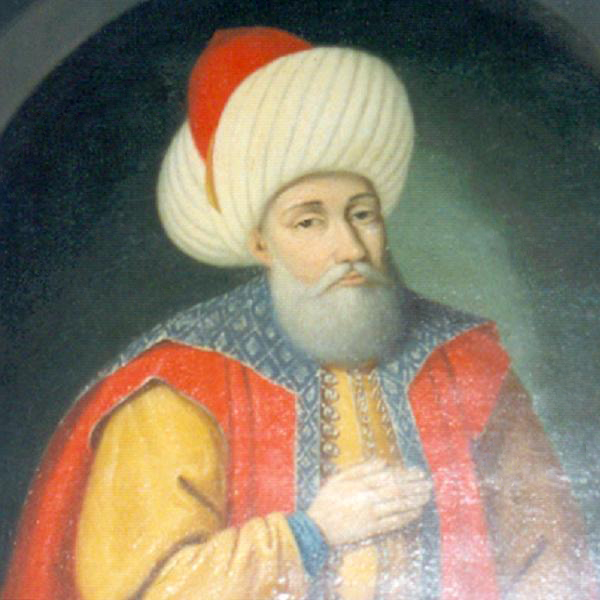
As a result of Sultan Orhan’s inspections at tekkes, Geyikli Baba Alevî Tekke of "The Sultan Höyüğü Foundation" from the successors of Bābā Rāss’ūl-Allāh (Bābā Eliyās al-Khorāsānī) received high gratitude of Orhan Gazi and Sultan had sent many gifts to this tekke.

Sufism stressed esoteric, allegoric and multiple interpretations of scripture combined to intuitive faith and a search for ecstatic experiences, and was spread by wandering dervishes believed to possess "bereket" (baraqat – spiritual power) and "keramet" (qaramat – miraculous powers) due to their special nearness to God. Dervish founders of "tariqat" (Sufi orders) were revered as Saints (Wali) and called dede, baba, pir, or shaykh, and their tombs were serving as pilgrimage centres.

Following the Seljuks, the Ottomans established their power in western Anatolia and gradually incorporated Eastern Anatolia into their empire. After Timur's victory over the Ottomans in the 15th century, the Ottoman hold on Eastern Anatolia weakened for a while, with autonomous Shi'ite Turkmen states (Ak Koyunlu, and Kara Koyunlu) fighting each other for hegemony.

==== Bektashi order ====
The Bektashi is a Shia Sufi order founded in the 13th century by Haji Bektash Veli, a dervish who escaped Central Asia and found refuge with the Seljuks in Anatolia at the time of the Mongol invasions (1219–23). This order gained a great following in rural areas and it later developed in two branches: the Celebi clan, who claimed to be physical descendants of Hajji Bektash Wali, were called "Bel evlâdları" (children of the loins), and became the hereditary spiritual leaders of the rural Alevis; and the Babagan, those faithful to the path "Yol evlâdları" (children of the path) who dominated the official Bektashi Sufi order with its elected leadership.

Later, the Bektashiyyah became the order/chaplains of the Janissaries, tolerated by the Ottomans as its monasteries and pilgrimage centres could be manipulated to control its Alevi followers.

== Ottoman Empire period ==
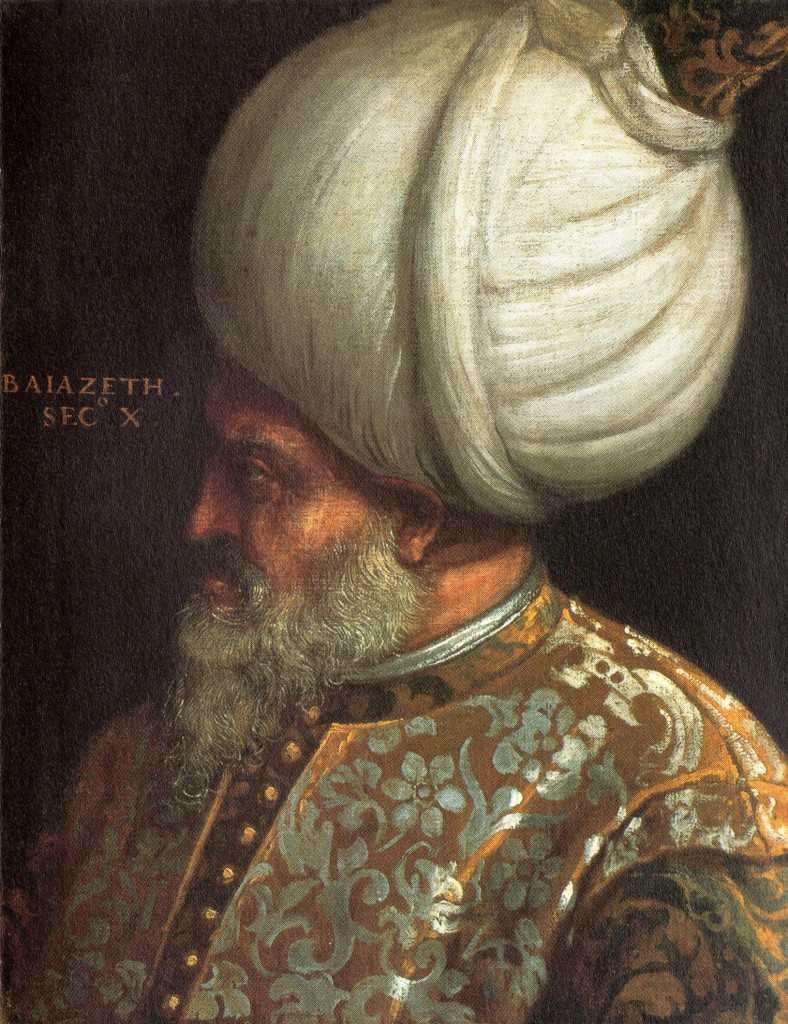
Ottoman Sultân Bayezid-i Velî, who was highly revered by the Bektashi, appointed Balım Sultan as the chief executive post for the Bektashi Order.

The Ottomans had accepted Sunni Islam in the 13th century as a means to unifying their empire, and later proclaimed themselves its defenders against the Safavid Shia state and related heretical sects. This created a gap between the Sunni Ottoman ruling elite and the Alevi Anatolian population. Anatolia became a battlefield between Safavids and Ottomans, each determined to include it in their Empire.

=== Bayezid II period ===
Ismail instigated a series of revolts culminating in a general Anatolian uprising against the Ottomans, whose Sultan Bayezid II mounted a major expedition 1502–1503 which pushed the Safavids and many of their Turkmen followers into Iran.

=== Selim I period ===
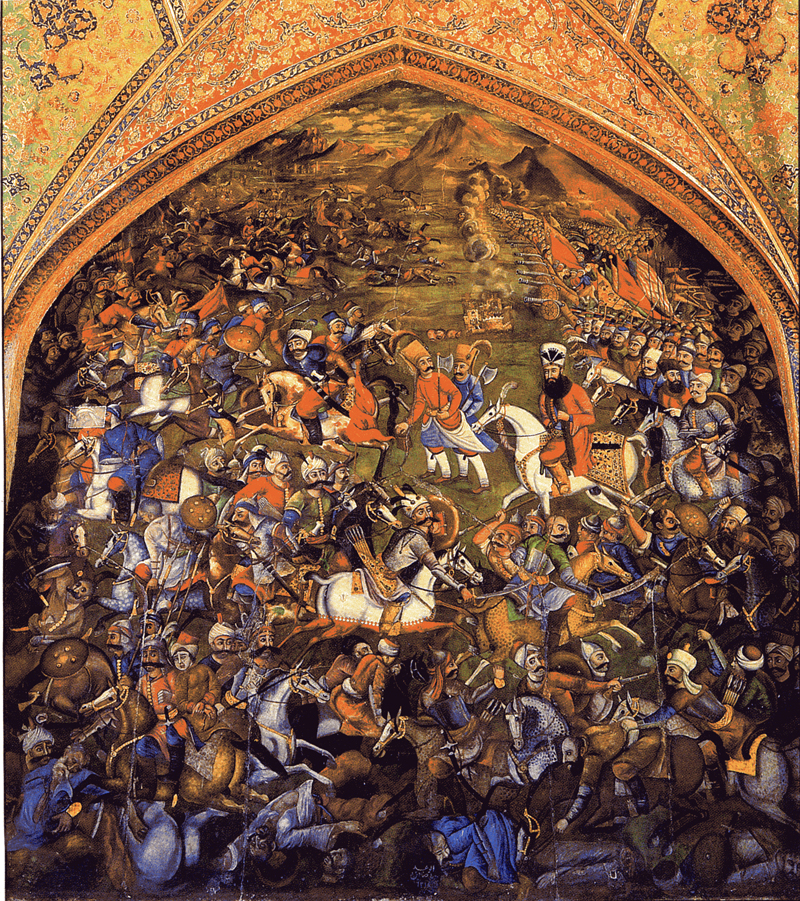
The Battle of Chaldiran.

The successor of Bayezid II, Sultan Selim I "The Grim", launched a vigorous campaign into eastern Anatolia, utilising a religious edict condemning Alevis as apostates to massacre many. In the summer of 1514 Selim I launched another offensive and won the major battle of Chaldiran on the eastern side of the Euphrates, convincing the Safavids to avoid open conflict with the Ottomans for the next century, and enabling him to overcome the last independent Turkmen dynasties in eastern Anatolia in 1515–1517.

=== Suleyman I period ===
Suleyman the Magnificent also ruthlessly suppressed Safavid supporters in eastern Anatolia leading three campaigns into northwest Iran. Finally in 1555 the peace of Amasya recognised Ottoman rule over Iraq and Eastern Anatolia and Iranian rule over Azerbaijan and Caucasia.

=== Kizilbashs ===
In the early 16th century, a militant ghulat Shia order emerged, called Kızılbaş or "Redheads" after their distinctive headgear. Shah Isma'il was a hereditary leader of the Safaviyya Sufi order centered in Ardabil who led his (predominantly Azeri) followers in conquering Persia. The result was the founding of the Safavid dynasty, and the conversion of Iran to Shiism. Shah Ismail's personal religious views are reflected in his Turkish-language Sufi poetry of a ghulat nature (he claimed divinity), of which selections came to be included in Alevi scriptural compilations, the Buyruks. The religion of the Iranian populace, however, fell under the domination of Shia Arab clerics who downplayed the ghulat beliefs of the Turkish warrior class.

==== The influences of Safavids ====
After the foundation of the Safavid Persian state, the new Turkmen Shahs gradually rid themselves of their tribal and sectarian origins in their bid to build a unified Iranian state. Twelver Shiism was proclaimed state religion, with a special role for the Safavi Shahs as descendants of alleged Ali and the Imams. Their supposed ancestry is not accepted by most shia Muslims today. This state religion developed into a very different system to the Alevi faith of their Kizilbash troops. Arab Twelver theologians were recruited from Jabal Amil in Lebanon and from Bahrain, and most Iranians were forcibly converted to Twelver Shiism. The Kizilbash tribal troops were gradually disbanded in favour of a regular Iranian slave army.The Qizilbash (red-heads) were Kurdish and Turkoman tribes who adhered to the Safavid Sufi Order, whose Sheikhs claimed descent from Ali. Under Ismā`il (d. 1524) they became dominant in Eastern Anatolia and conquered Azerbaijan with its capital Tabriz, where Ismā`il named himself Shah in 1501 and went on to conquer all of Iran. His missionaries spread a message of revolt against the Sunni Ottomans in Anatolia, claiming that Ismā`il was the awaited "mahdi" (massiah), and Anatolia became the scene of protracted warfare between Ottomans and Safavids.

==== The consequences of Qizilbash-Sunni division in Anatolia ====
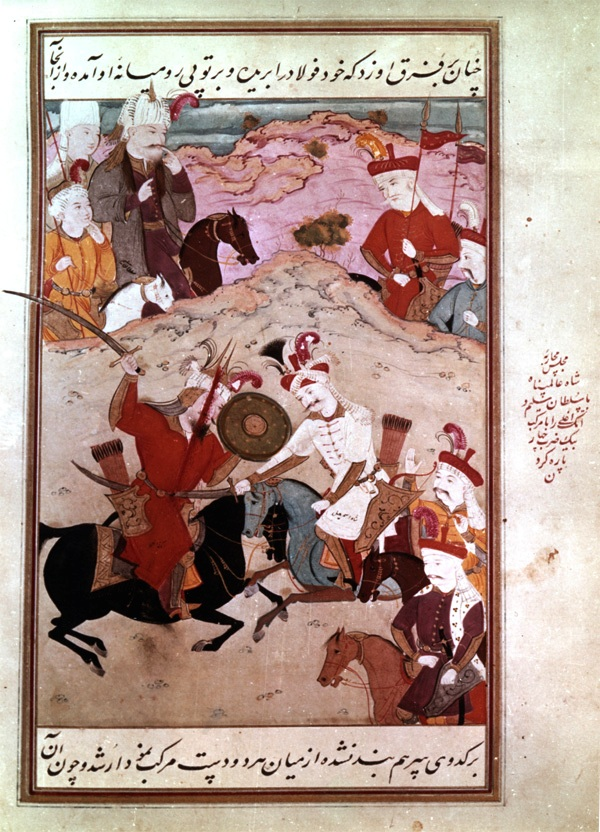
Ismail I in the Battle of Chaldiran.

The Kizilbash in Anatolia were now militarily, politically and religiously separated from their source in Iran, retreated to isolated rural areas and turned inward, developing their unique structures and doctrines. Following the severe persecution and massacres by the Ottomans which went on into the 18th century, Alevis went underground using taqiya, religious dissimulation permitted by a handful of Shi`a branches, to conceal their faith (pretending to be Sunnis) and survive in a hostile environment.

Kizilbash and Bektashis shared common religious beliefs and practices becoming intermingled as Alevis in spite of many local variations. Isolated from both the Sunni Ottomans and the Twelver Shi`a Safavids, Alevis developed traditions, practices, and doctrines by the early 17th century which marked them as a closed autonomous religious community. As a result of the immense pressures to conform to Sunni Islam, Alevis developed a tradition of opposition to all forms of external religion.

Meanwhile, the rulers of the Ottoman Empire gradually distanced themselves from their nomadic Turkic heritage, ultimately (during the thirteenth century) adopting the Sunni Islam of their Mediterranean subjects. During the long rivalry with Safavid Qizilbash tribes fought for local control of the Anatolian highlands, and were responsible for several 15th and 16th century uprisings against the Ottomans. The 1555 Peace of Amasya found them on the "wrong" side of the Ottoman / Iranian border, as subjects of an Ottoman court which viewed them with suspicion. Massacres of Qizilbash occurred.

The career of Pir Sultan Abdal takes place in this context. Apparently a 16th-century folk musician from Sivas, Pir Sultan Abdal was known for playing a stringed instrument called the bağlama and singing songs critical of his Ottoman governors, in defense of the rights of the Anatolian peasantry. Hanged for fomenting rebellion, he became another beloved figure in Alevi folklore and is now often invoked as a symbol of Alevism's leftist aspect. He is also preferred by Alevi Kurds, who appreciate his protest against the Turkish establishment, over Haji Bektash Veli (whom they identify with the Turks).

=== The emergence of Ishikism and Yazdanism ===
After the Kızılbaş lost their power in Anatolia, they are assumed to have merged into the Anatolian Alevis. Kurdish Alevis are sometimes still called Kızılbaş. Even as far east as Afghanistan and Pakistan, many Shias have "Qizilbash" as their family names.

Under Ottoman rule the Alevis emerged as an endogamous ethnic group, primarily Turkish-speaking but also including Kurdish communities, concentrated in rural Anatolia. (One writer speculates that Dersim's Kurds converted to Alevism from another ghulat sect.) Led by hereditary dedes, and sometimes by Bektashi dervishes, they practiced "taqiyya" (dissimulation, secrecy) about their religion.

=== The emergence of a new Bektashi identity ===
Bektashi identity may have been adopted to this end, since the Bektashis were technically Sunni and tolerated by the court. After the 1826 disbanding of the Janissary Corps, the now-proscribed Bektashi order began to meet underground. Adherents of the two groups blurred together to some extent. In the years before and during World War I the Çelebi family, one of two leadership groups associated with the shrine of Haji Bektash, attempted to extend its authority to the village Bektashi (Alevi) dedes, whose own hierarchy was in disarray. Some Alevi groups accepted this Bektashi authority, while others did not.

== Turkish Republic period ==
Rural Alevis were marginalised and discriminated against in the Ottoman Empire, although the official Bektashi order enjoyed a privileged role through its close association with the Janissary professional military corps. After their disbandment, Bektashi secret circles remained extremely active, Bektashis becoming progressive, anticlerical, and liberal, viewed suspiciously by the authorities and cooperating with others hostile to the establishment such as Freemasons and Young Turks. Until 1925 it was estimated that 10 to 20 percent of Turkey's adult male population were still members of the Bektashi. In 1930, a law was drafted by Atatürk to secularize the population which banned all religious lodges. After that time, Bektashi World Center was founded in Albania. Under The Adnan Menderes Government Administration, the Hacıbektaş centre was restored and reopened in 1964 as a museum, with annual celebrations in August for tourists in memory of the Saint.

=== Alevism and Kemalism ===
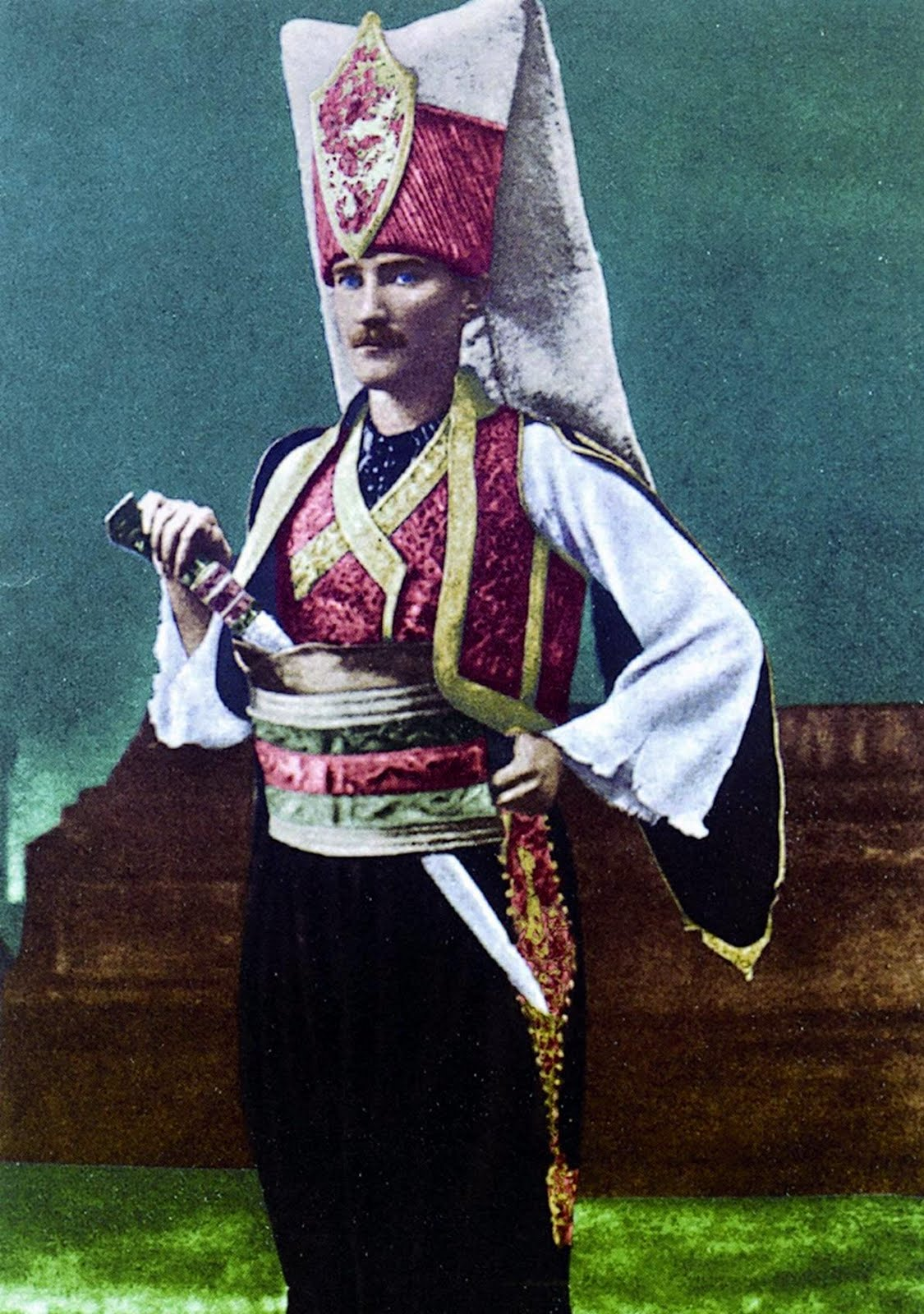
Mustafa Kemal Atatürk, the first president of Turkey, in Janissary clothing.

Kemalism turned Alevis into legally equal citizens, and its reforms had a radical impact on them as roads were built through their formerly isolated areas, compulsory schooling was introduced, and communications improved, drawing them out of their marginalisation into active engagement in social and political life and into deeper contact with the outside world and the state centre. The new Turkish Republic fulfilled many Alevi expectations, enabling them to identify with and support its nation-building measures – the Alevis still see themselves as the protectors of Kemalism and democracy in Turkey.

In his drive for secularization, Atatürk later (1925) destroyed most religious frameworks, Sunni as well as Alevi, closing down the orders and confiscating their monasteries. Although driven underground, the orders continued to enjoy popularity in secret.

Alevis are proud of their cooperation with Atatürk, and the fact that the Çelebi and Dedebaba of the Hacıbektaş monastery had supported him. Alevis were his faithful allies in the war of independence, in the setting up of the modern Turkish secular nationalist state, and in the destruction of Ottomanism. The early Kemalist republic is regarded as the ideal state in which the Alevis were fairly represented proportionately to their percentage of the total population in the National Assembly.

Alevis saw Atatürk as Mahdi (Messiah), a Saviour, a divine emanation following Ali and Hajji Bektash Wali, sent to save them from the Sunni Ottoman yoke, who turned Alevi ideals into state practice, and his portrait is hung up beside Ali's in many Alevi homes. Atatürk on his part saw the Alevis as allies in his struggle against the traditional Ottoman elite and for secularism and Turkish nationalism. He selectively included Alevi cultural markers in his construct of the new Turkish national collective identity. However, to ensure national unity, the unique Alevi identity was subordinated to the general Anatolian-Turkish national identity.

However, the stigma of Alevism remained even as the younger generation tried to adapt itself to the secular Turkish identity. Alevis found that they still faced discrimination in employment and education, and again turned to taqiya for stigma management, adapting to Sunni ways in order to get a share of the scarce resources. Many concealed that they were Alevi, visited the mosques, and kept Ramadan. Education and migration were seen as the gateway to social upward mobility, and from the 1960s on a new Alevi middle class appeared.

==== The influences of secularization process on Alevism ====
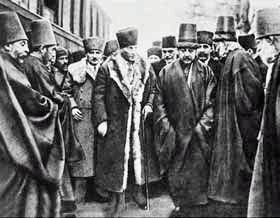
Atatürk in 1923, with members of the Mevlevi Order, before its institutional expression became illegal and their dervish lodge was changed into the Mevlana Museum.

Secularization diminished traditional threats to Alevi existence transforming Turkish society into a less Alevi-hostile community. The downplay of religion in public life and the Westernization of the ruling elite tended to turn Alevism into just one of several cultural and folklorist themes in Turkish nationalism. While still trying to maintain their ethnic identity, Alevis became increasingly secularized and neglected their traditional institutions. However, the wall of Sunni prejudice to the historically marginalized Alevi was not easily overcome, and Alevis remained to some extent the object of suspicion, in their turn remaining somewhat sceptical of the central state and its institutions.

As the existential danger receded and the community opened up to the outside world, solidarity ties loosened. ritual and ceremony lost some of their meaning and the spiritual leadership gradually lost its authority. This change in Alevi internal structures was accelerated by the massive migration into the cities, where Alevis underwent a process of secularization and modernization which broke traditional hereditary ties to the religious hierarchy. Religion lost its relevancy and even intermarriage was practiced by some. A new generation grew up in the 1960s that had not passed through initiation and was not familiar with the Alevi "Way" (yol).

=== Incidents ===
==== Incidents before 1980 Turkish coup d'état ====
The first massacre that targeted Alevi Kurds was the Dersim Massacre in 1938. Later, during the 1960s–70s, the politicization of Alevi communities within the Turkish leftist movement angered right-wingers, ultra-nationalists and Islamists, who cooperated in carrying out pogroms of Alevis in the late 1970s. Malatya in 1978, Maraş in 1979, and Çorum in 1980 witnessed the murder of hundreds of Alevis, the torching of hundreds of homes, and lootings committed by ultranationalists and reactionaries. These are now believed to have been organized by the state. Such massacres continued in the following decades and included the Sivas Massacre (1993) and the Gazi incidents in Istanbul (1995).

===== Dersim rebellion =====
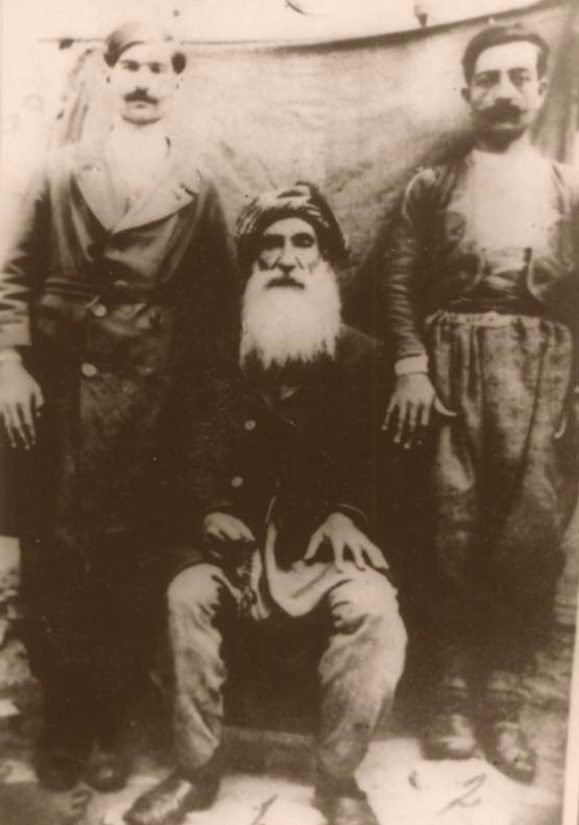
Primary actor of the Dersim Rebellion Seyid Riza.

During the violent suppression of the rebellion of the local population of Dersim province by the Turkish Army in the summer of 1937 and the spring of 1938 thousands of Kurmanji and Zazaki (Kirmanjki, Kirdki) speaking Alevi Kurds were killed and thousands more were taken into exile, depopulating the province. A key component of the Turkification process was the policy of massive population resettlement, a result of the 1934 law on resettlement, a policy targeting the region of Dersim as one of its first test cases with disastrous consequences for the local population.

===== Maraş massacre =====
Maraş Massacre of December 1978 was the massacre of over hundred civilians, mostly Alevi Kurdish, living as migrant workers in shanty towns in the industrial heart of Turkey. The direct perpetrators were the Greywolves. Though the tensions were initially ignited by the bombing by right-wing militants of a cinema frequently visited by ultra-nationalists, the incident is best remembered for the subsequent campaign of violence directed against left-wingers, largely Alevis, although some left-wing Sunnis and Kurds were also targeted.

===== Çorum events =====
Çorum Massacre occurred in the province of Çorum in Turkey between May and July 1980. Nationalist Sunni Muslims targeted the Alevi Turkish minority and killed more than half a hundred of them. More than 200 were injured. Another target was the social-liberal Republican People's Party (CHP). Many victims were youngsters and women.

==== Incidents after 1980 Turkish coup d'état ====
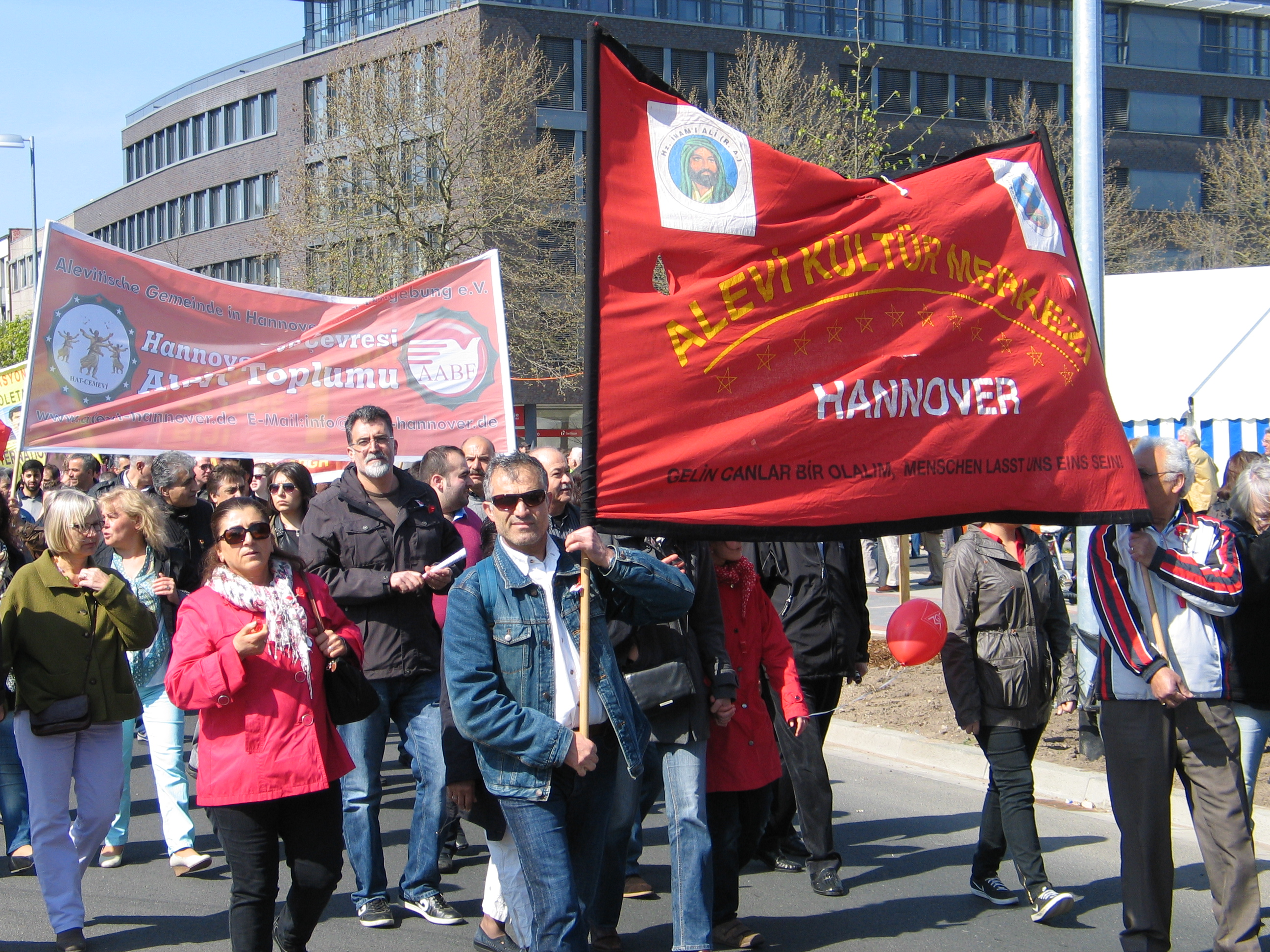
Alevis in Hannover, 2013

The violence of the 70s resulted in the military takeover of 1980 whose purges hurt Alevis harder than others because of their leftist commitment, and the Hacıbektaş celebrations were forbidden for several years. As a reaction, community identification intensified and religious and cultural boundary markers against the Sunni majority regained importance.

The return of many Turks to their religious roots and the politicization of their communal identities were a crisis response to modernity and the accelerated rate of change it forced on Turkish society. Secularist ideologies such as Kemalism and socialism seemed to have failed and not delivered the hoped for goods. Alevis were not willing any more to sacrifice their communal identity on the altar of class-struggle and began consciously to identify themselves as a political group on the basis of a shared religious identity.

Much of the violence during the late 70s although presented by state and media as left versus right was in fact Sunni versus Alevi. Ultra-nationalists allied themselves to Sunni fundamentalists in attacking Alevis. Even some communists of Sunni background sided with conservative Sunnis against their political allies of Alevi background. In 1978 in the city of Kahramanmaraş in southern Turkey local Sunnis went on a rampage, slaughtering scores of leftist Alevis from the nearby villages in the worst massacre in living memory.

The democratic opening in Turkey in 1988/1989 broke taboos and opened up public discussions in the press. Publications were allowed that would never have been permitted before and liberals pushed for ethnographic studies of the Turkish society mosaic. Since 1989 the liberal press has accepted Alevism as a separate religious community. Along with other marginalized groups Alevis increased their political activism and fought for equality and official recognition of Alevism as an Islamic community with its special characteristics, for legalization of its religious ritual and practice, for integration of Alevi doctrine in the state education system, and for allotment of a fair share in the media.

The 1980 military takeover brought all Turkish secularist movements under pressure due to the growing Islamization of public and private life. Alevis allied themselves to secular-liberal Sunni groups that feared for the secular Kemalist state – but Alevis this time were not absorbed by these groups but cooperated with them as a separately identifiable group.

As Sunni Islamism gained strength in the late 1980s and religious intolerance spread, an Alevi backlash occurred in the form of a cultural revival spearheaded by the new educated Alevi elite who organised foundations and trusts, rebuild Saint tombs, and restored rituals. There was an effort to reclaim traditions and re-mark boundaries, a call to reconstruct Alevi culture, community, and identity. A process was initiated of a reinterpretation of Alevi history and religion, culminating in an "invention of traditions" accompanied by a "coming out" of Alevis from century long dissimulation practices. For the first time in modern history Alevis dared to publicly accept their stigmatized identity, articulate their collective interests towards the state, and demand equality with the Sunni majority.

The government was unhappy about the outcome of liberalisation. It had hoped to woo Alevis into a pure Turkish nationalist camp and separate them from other oppressed minorities, especially the exploding Kurdish nationalism. There was a growing state interest in dividing Alevis from Kurds and manipulating them to further the regime's aims. The Alevis for their part, encouraged by the weakening of the Soviet bloc and revived claims for minority recognition around the world, pressed for increased recognition in Turkish society. Alevi publications multiplied, and Alevis supported the claims of other minorities such as the Laz and the Kurds.

The pervasive influence of religion in public life in the 1990s has grave potential for a worsening of Sunni-Alevi tensions. In 1990 the Ministry of Cults took over the organisation of the Hacibektas festivities under the excuse of making it an international attraction. Alevis were unhappy about its interference in the programme especially in 1993 and 1994 as government officials stressed the Turkish elements in Alevism but ignored the community's specificity and did not give it any operating space as a minority community.

With the political thaw of the 1990s, Alevis in Turkey, influenced by the activities of their brethren in Europe, especially Germany, began to actively publish Alevi books, and open Alevi cultural centers.

Turkish state politics after the military takeover encouraged Sunni-orthodox and nationalist unity ideology. Sunni Sufi orders such as the Naqshbandi, Suleimanci, and Nurcu (Hizmet/Servis movement) became more visible, and Sunni propaganda disseminated by the government stated that Alevis were actually Sunnis with some divergent customs, negating the uniqueness of Alevism and trying to integrate it in state Sunnism. Whilst accepting that Alevism has important Turkish elements, the authorities tried to Sunnify Alevism, initiating a state policy of assimilation and Sunnification. Infrastructure improvements in Alevi villages were made conditional on compliance with mosque construction and the participation of all Alevi children in Sunni religious instruction.

When Sunni fundamentalism appeared in the 1970s, many Alevis reacted by reinterpreting Alevism in socialist and Marxist idiom that seemed to have an affinity to Alevi ideals. There was a generation gap in Alevism: the older generation remained Kemalist and hoped for the official reopening of the Bektashi order whilst the young generation became very politicized as they came in contact with revolutionary thought in universities, high schools, and trade unions. They claimed that the old forms were outdated and that Alevis must work for a radical restructuring of society. They saw all "reactionary" elements which tried to assimilate them into mainstream Sunni life as enemies, and joined extreme leftist parties, reinterpreting historical opposition to Sunnism in terms of class struggle and continuing the traditional Alevi role of opposition to the state. Some leftist Alevi activists also turned against their own religious hierarchy, branding them feudal exploiters of the masses and driving dedes out of their villages.

===== Sivas incidents =====
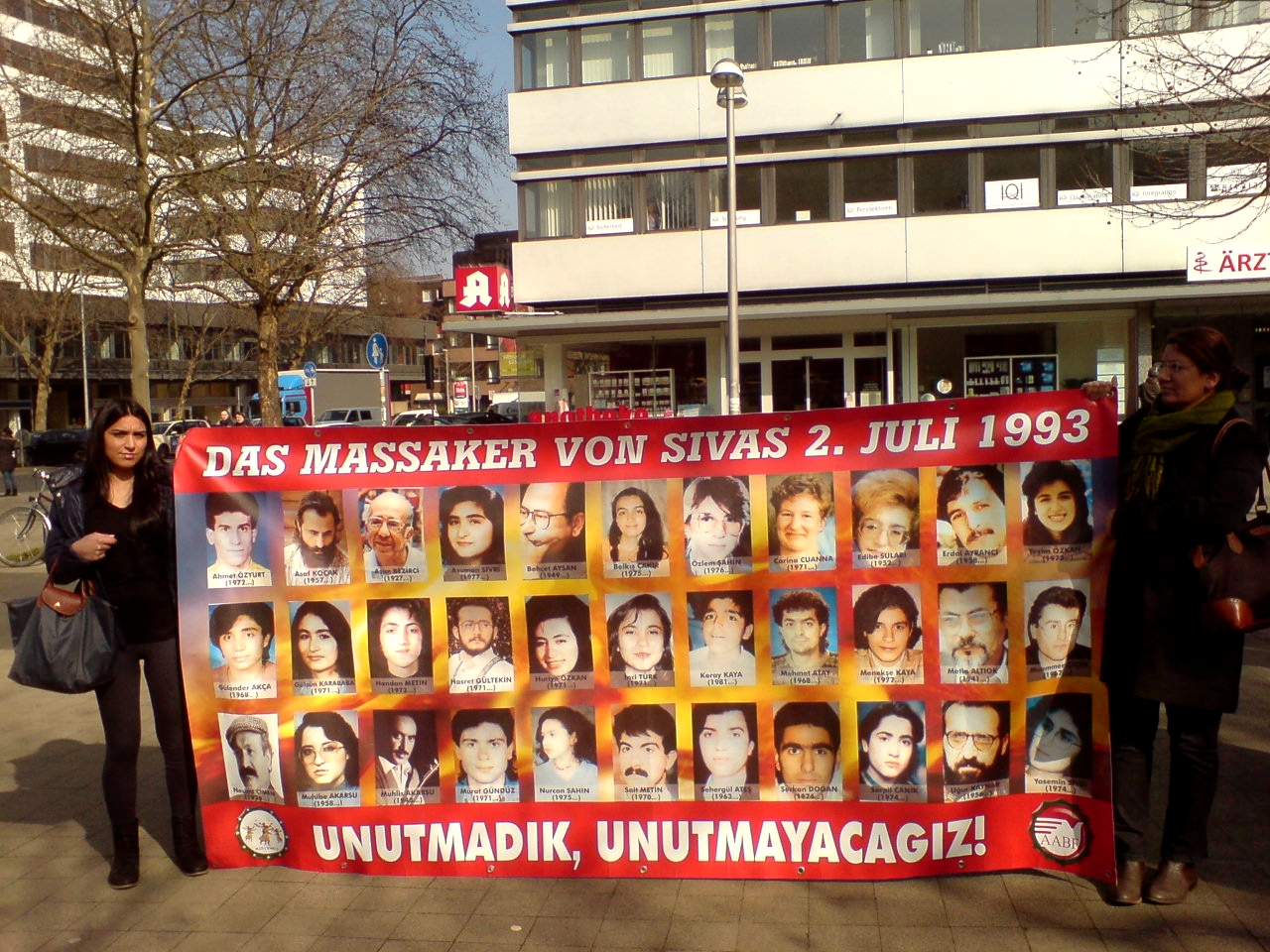
A demonstration in Germany for the victims of the Sivas incident

The inter-communal violence reached its dénouement in Sivas on 2 July 1993, when thirty-six people (Alevis, intellectuals, and a Dutch anthropologist) attending the Pir Sultan Abdal Festival were burned to death in a hotel by Sunni locals. The state security services did not interfere and the prosecution against leaders of the riot was not energetically pursued.

===== Gazi Quarter riots =====
1995 Gazi Quarter riots were events that occurred in March 1995 at the Gazi Quarter, a working-class neighborhood in the then Gaziosmanpaşa district, today Sultangazi district, of Istanbul, Turkey, where mostly Alevis live. The riots began after a provocative gunned attack on several cafés at the same time, and spread over other places in Istanbul and also in Ankara in the next days. During the four-day lasting unrest, a total of 23 people were killed and more than 400 were injured at three different places.

==== Recent history ====
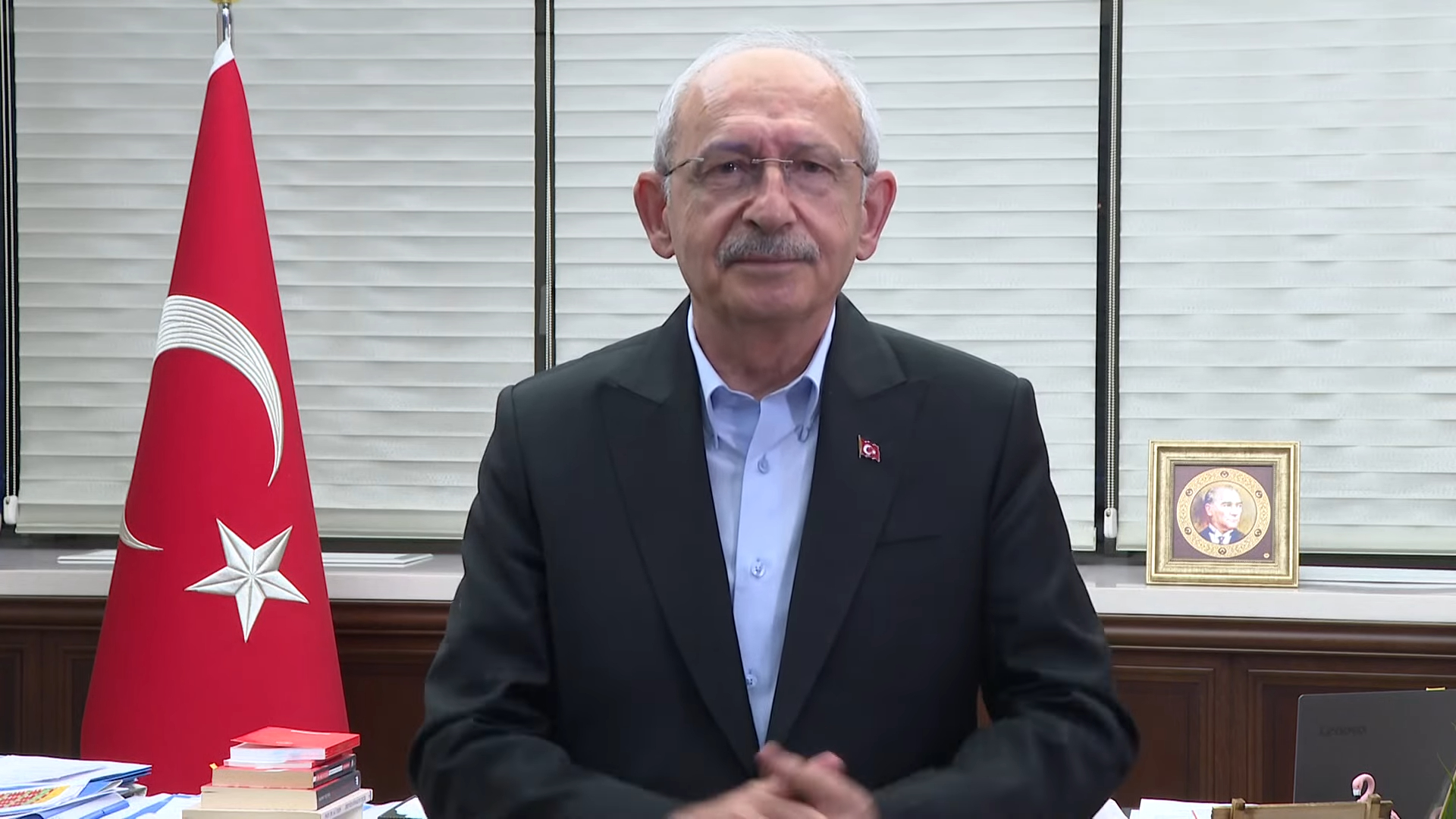
Kemal Kılıçdaroğlu, Alevi Zaza ex-President of Republican People's Party

More recently Istanbul municipal leaders from the Islamic political party Refah tried to raze an Alevi monastery and close the Ezgi cafe where young Alevis meet. In January 1995, a comedian cracked a joke about "Alevi incest" on Turkish TV sparking the first ever street protest by thousands of Alevi youths. Besides, the recent plan to expand Ottoman architecture on Taksim Square, which turned into an anti-government protest all over Turkey, has encountered stiff resistance by some Alevis as well in Turkey and Western Europe.

As of 2025, Alevi/Bektashi is officially recognized through Ministry of Culture and Tourism under the 'Presidency of Alevi/Bektashi Culture'. Outside of Turkey, recognitions include the European Union, UNESCO, United Kingdom, Canada, Australia and Albania.

== Chart ==
The historical emergence of the Shī‘ah Imāmī Alevi Ṭarīqah and other related non-Muslim sects

Alevis amongst Shia Islam

== See also ==
- Anti-Alevism
- Religion in Turkey

== Literature ==
- John Kingsley Birge, The Bektashi order of dervishes, London and Hartford, 1937 (out of print)
- John Brown, The Darvishes of Oriental Spiritualism, 1927, 1st Edition.
- Aykan Erdemir, "Tradition and Modernity: Alevis' Ambiguous Terms and Turkey's Ambivalent Subjects", Middle Eastern Studies, 2005, vol.41, no.6, pp. 937–951.
- Burhan Kocadağ, Alevi Bektaşi Tarihi, Can Yayınları, 1996.
- Karin Vorhoff, Zwischen Glaube, Nation und neuer Gemeinschaft: Alevitische Identität in der Türkei der Gegenwart, Berlin, 1995
- Irène Mélikoff, Hadji Bektach, un mythe et ses avatars. Genèse et évolution du soufisme populaire en Turquie., Leiden, 1998 [Islamic History and Civilization, Studies and Texts, volume 20], ISBN 90-04-10954-4
- ____, Uyur İdik Uyardılar, Cem Yayınevi, 1993.
- Matti Moosa, Extremist Shiites: the Ghulat Sects, Syracuse University Press, 1988.
- Ali Yaman and Aykan Erdemir, Alevism-Bektashism: A Brief Introduction, London: England Alevi Cultural Centre & Cem Evi, 2006, ISBN 975-98065-3-3
