= Paul Geddes =

Paul Geddes may refer to:

- Paul Geddes (footballer), Scottish footballer
- Paul Geddes (businessman), British businessman
- Talbot H. Green, né Paul Geddes, American merchant and politician
