= Massiah =

Massiah is a surname, and may refer to:

- Gustave Massiah, or Gus, (born 1941), French economist, urbanist, and political analyst
- Louis Massiah, American filmmaker
- Steve Massiah (born 1979), Guyana born American cricketer
- Winston Massiah, see Massiah v. United States (1964), case in the Supreme Court of the United States
- Zeeteah Massiah, British singer from Barbados, West Indies
- Frederica Massiah-Jackson, Philadelphia Court of Common Pleas judge
- Massiah McDonald (born 1990), Montserratian footballer
- Zavier Massiah-Edwards (born 2007), English footballer
