= Shepshed Dynamo F.C. =

Association football club in England

Coordinates: 52°46′28″N 1°17′13″W

Shepshed Dynamo
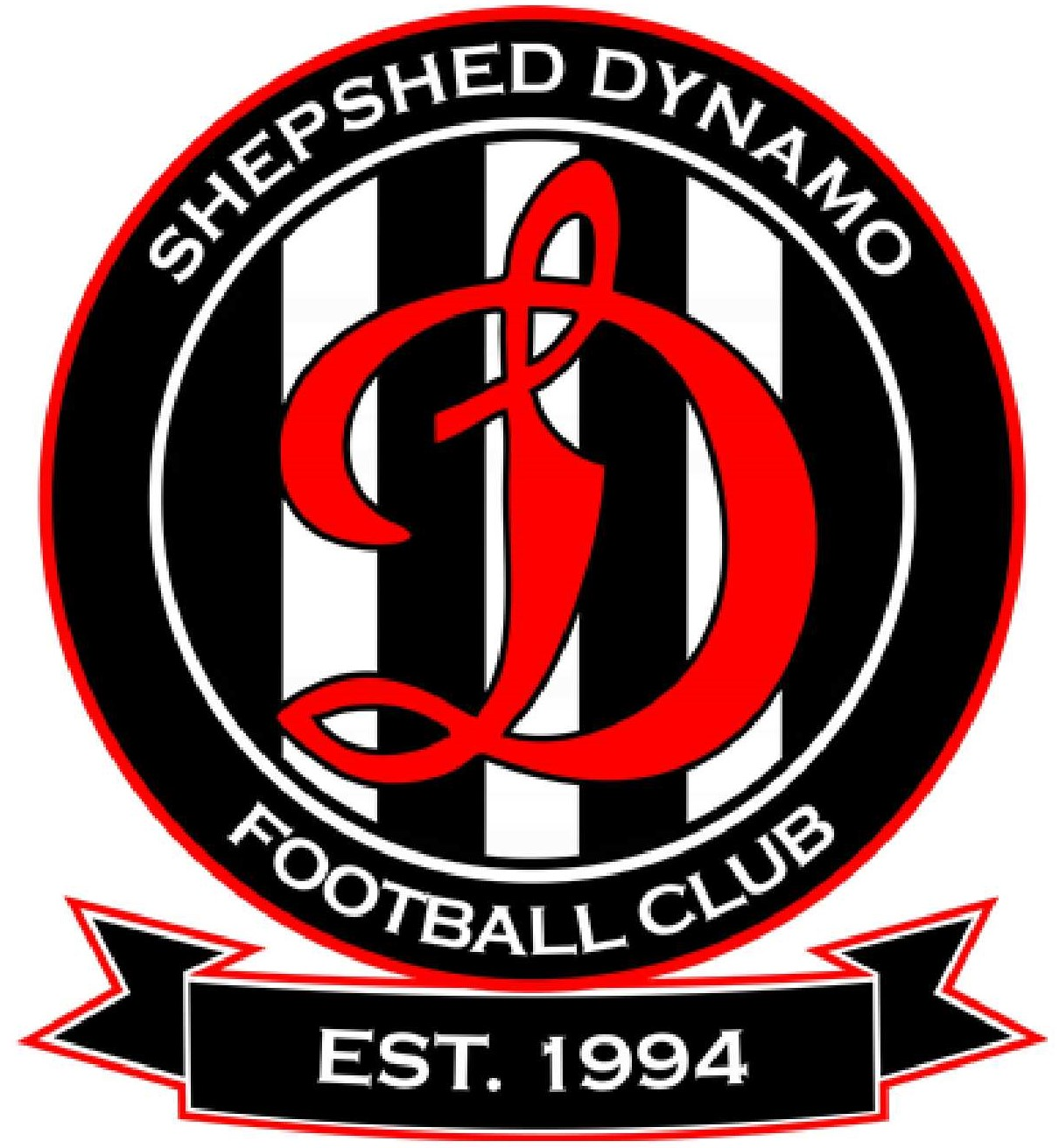
- Full name: Shepshed Dynamo Football Club
- Nickname: The Dynamo
- Founded: 1994
- Ground: The Dovecote Stadium
- Capacity: 2,500 (500 seated)
- Chairman: Luke Clayton
- Manager: Gary Drake
- League: Northern Premier League Division One Midlands
- 2025–26: Northern Premier League Division One Midlands, 7th of 22
Home colours	Away colours

Shepshed Dynamo Football Club is an English football club based in the small town of Shepshed in the north west of Leicestershire, England. Founded as Shepshed Albion towards the end of the 19th century, the team played for the majority of their early history in the Leicestershire Senior League before a series of league wins and promotions the late 1970s and early 1980s, when they were known as Shepshed Charterhouse, took them within two promotions of The Football League. The club encountered financial difficulties in 1994 and reformed under the new name in recognition of the help provided by local side Loughborough Dynamo. They currently play in the Northern Premier League Division One Midlands.

== History ==
=== Early years ===
Football emerged in Shepshed in the late 19th century and records exist of a violent encounter between the Albion club and Loughborough Corinthians in 1899, but it was not until 1907 that the club joined the Leicestershire Senior League (LSL). Albion had almost immediate success, winning the League in 1911 and again in 1921. They remained in the Leicestershire Senior League for the next 60 years, being promoted and relegated between its two divisions numerous times.

=== 1975–1992: The Charterhouse years ===
Having been taken over and given significant financial backing by Maurice Clayton, the founder and managing director of Charterhouse Holdings plc, the club became Shepshed Charterhouse in the summer of 1975. The club won the LSL Second Division in 1977–78 following that immediately with three successive LSL First Division titles in 1978–79, 1979–80 and 1980–81, and were admitted to the Midland League for the first time in 1981.

Charterhouse won the Midland League title at the first attempt and when this league merged with the Yorkshire League to form the Northern Counties East League (NCEL) in 1982, they were placed in the NCEL Premier Division. They won their sixth successive league title to earn promotion to the Southern Football League Midland Division for the 1983–84 season. This season also gleaned success in cup competitions, with Charterhouse winning the NCEL Cup as well as successfully negotiating the qualifying rounds of the FA Cup to reach the first round proper, where they lost 5–1 to Preston North End at Deepdale on the 20 November 1982.

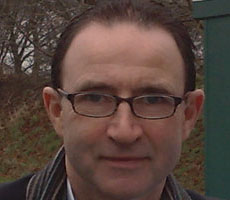
Former Shepshed manager Martin O'Neill

A fourth successive promotion was secured with a second-place finish in the Southern League Midland Division in 1983–84. It is often erroneously stated that Charterhouse gained seven successive promotions during this period, due perhaps to the club achieving six successive first-place finishes, followed by a second place. However, the non-league pyramid was not as formalised at the time as it has subsequently become, and the club won the LSL Premier Division three seasons running.

Playing in the Southern League Premier Division for the first time, the club were able to secure four safe mid-table finishes, finishing as high as seventh in 1985–86. However, they struggled to replicate that form after being transferred to the Northern Premier League Premier Division in 1988, despite appointing arguably their most famous manager, former Nottingham Forest player Martin O'Neill, in July 1989. O'Neill would only be at the club for a few months before going on to forge a highly successful managerial career with Leicester City and Celtic amongst others. Charterhouse however would find no such success, finishing bottom of the league in 1990–91 and 1991–92 resulting in relegation to the NPL Division One.

=== Decline and reformation ===
Following relegation, the club changed their name back to Shepshed Albion in 1992, but a year later they were relegated again, to the Midland Football Combination. Despite their single season in the Combination being relatively successful, finishing fourth in the 22 team league, off-field problems saw the future of the club in doubt. With help from local side Loughborough Dynamo the club were able to restructure and chose to signal a new era by adopting the name Shepshed Dynamo. The club were placed in the Midland Football Alliance for the 1994–95 season and performed strongly; finishing the season in fourth.

=== Brief resurgence ===
The 1995–96 season started with an impressive 23 game unbeaten start. The club went on to win the league by eight points and were promoted to the Southern League Division One Midland for the 1996–97 season. Promotion brought its own difficulties and Shepshed were forced to seek financial help from Charnwood Borough Council to complete the necessary improvements to the club's facilities to allow them to take their place in the Southern League.

Their first season back in the Southern League resulted in a safe mid-table position, but it was in the FA Cup that they caused their fans the most excitement. Having seen off Stratford Town, Sandwell Borough, Solihull Borough, Knypersley Victoria and Bromsgrove Rovers, the club visited Carlisle United in the First Round Proper eventually going down 6–0 to the Football League side.

=== Back in decline ===
A re-organisation of the Southern League for the start of the 1999–2000 season saw Shepshed moved to Division One West. A poor season spent fighting relegation resulted in a final position of 18th.

Shepshed finished bottom of the Southern League Division One West in 2003–04. However, due to the expansion of the English Football Conference to three divisions, and the subsequent reorganisation of the National League System Shepshed avoided demotion to a regional division and found themselves placed in the Northern Premier League Division One for the 2004–05 season, now at step eight of the pyramid. Further reorganisation of the lower leagues in 2007 left the club in the new Northern Premier League Division One South.

The 2010–11 season finished with Shepshed in the relegation places. However, they were reprieved from relegation to the Midland Football Alliance at the end of the 2010–11 season due to Rushden and Diamonds being expelled from the Football Conference.

The previous season's reprieve from relegation did not last long, with the club finishing bottom of the Northern Premier League Division One South in 2012 and therefore being relegated to the United Counties League at step nine of the English football league system, the lowest level of football Shepshed has played at since the non-league system was first formalised in 1979. Following one season in the United Counties, the club was moved into the Midland Football Alliance. In 2014, the Midland Football Alliance and the Midland Football Combination merged to form the new Midland Football League and Shepshed were placed in the Premier Division of the new league.

== League history ==
From Football Club History Database

1907–1927 Leicestershire Senior League; 1946–1948 Leicestershire Senior League (West); 1948–1954 Leicestershire Senior League D2; 1954–1958 Leicestershire Senior League D1; 1958–1966 Leicestershire Senior League D2; 1966–1970 Leicestershire Senior League D1; 1970–1978 Leicestershire Senior League D2; 1978–1981 Leicestershire Senior League D1; 1981–1982 Midland Football League; 1982–1983 Northern Counties East Premier Division (L8); 1983–1984 Southern League Midland Division (L7); 1984–1988 Southern League Premier Division (L6); 1988–1992 Northern Premier League Premier Division (L6)	1992–1993 Northern Premier League Division One (L7); 1993–1994 Midland Football Combination (L8); 1994–1996 Midland Football Alliance (L8); 1996–1999 Southern League Division One Midland (L7); 1999–2004 Southern League Division One West (L7); 2004–2007 Northern Premier League Division One (L8); 2007–2012 Northern Premier League Division One South (L8); 2012–2013 United Counties League (L9); 2013–2014 Midland Football Alliance (L9); 2014–2019 Midland Football League Premier Division (L9); 2019-2021 United Counties League Premier Division (L9); 2021–Present Northern Premier League Division One Midlands (L8)

L7 = L6 = Level 6 of the football pyramid; Level 7 of the football pyramid; L8 = Level 8 of the football pyramid; L9 = Level 9 of the football pyramid.

- Seasons spent at Level 6 of the football pyramid: 8
- Seasons spent at Level 7 of the football pyramid: 10
- Seasons spent at Level 8 of the football pyramid: 17
- Seasons spent at Level 9 of the football pyramid: 9

Note: The Non-league system was first formalised in 1979 with the creation of the Alliance Premier League and the recognition of the Northern Premier League, Southern Football League and Isthmian League as direct feeder divisions to the Alliance. It was not until 1982 that these divisions had their own recognised "feeder leagues". Therefore, until entering the Northern Counties East Premier Division in 1982, Shepshed had not been part of the pyramid.

== Records ==
=== Shepshed Albion FC ===
==== Pre-1975 ====
- Best FA Cup performance: Preliminary qualifying round, 1949–50 (replay)

==== Post-1992 ====
- Best FA Cup performance: 3rd qualifying round, 1991–92, 1992–93
- Best FA Trophy performance: 2nd qualifying round, 1991–92, 1992–93

=== Shepshed Charterhouse FC ===
- Best FA Cup performance: 1st round, 1982–83
- Best FA Trophy performance: 1st round, 1985–86 (replay), 1989–90 (replay)
- Best FA Vase performance: Semi-finals, 1978–79 (replay)

=== Shepshed Dynamo FC ===
- Best FA Cup performance: 1st round, 1996–97
- Best FA Trophy performance: 3rd round, 1998–99
- Best FA Vase performance: 4th round, 2016–17, 2018–19

== Ground ==
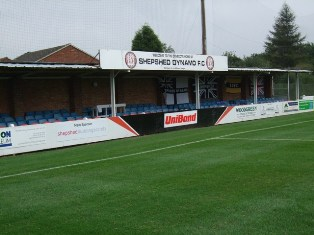
A view of the Home Fans Stand

The club have played their games at the Dovecote, situated on Butthole Lane on the north side of the town, since 1891. The ground is allegedly referenced in the Domesday Book as a sporting facility for the village. It is possible, due to the nature of the name Butthole Lane, that the ground itself was used for the village archery practice. The ground is still owned by the family of former Charterhouse Chairman Maurice Clayton.

== Current squad ==
As of 23 August 2026

Note: Flags indicate national team as defined under FIFA eligibility rules; some limited exceptions apply. Players may hold more than one non-FIFA nationality.

No.	Pos.	Nation	Player
—	GK	ENG	Tray Brightmore
—	GK	ENG	Alfie Roberts
—	GK	ENG	Dan Wallis
—	GK	AUS	Jake Williams
—	DF	ENG	Ben Bayliss
—	DF	ENG	Ethan Baynham
—	DF	ENG	Kelly Fombad
—	DF	ENG	Harry Harrison
—	DF	ENG	Declan Peart
—	DF	ENG	Jack Samples
—	DF	ENG	Chad Timson
—	MF	ENG	Josh Burniston

No.	Pos.	Nation	Player
—	MF	ENG	Kyle Dixon
—	MF	ENG	Josh Halliday
—	MF	ENG	Reece Massey
—	MF	ENG	Jiah Medrano
—	MF	ENG	Najeem Oriola
—	MF	ENG	Lewis Warnaby
—	FW	ENG	Jamal Adams
—	FW	ENG	Lucas Brown (on loan from Tamworth)
—	FW	ENG	Jack Butterfill
—	FW	ENG	John McHugh
—	FW	ENG	Taylor Wyse (on loan from Tamworth)

== Colours and crest ==
Crest used by Shepshed Albion until 1994

The current first team strip consists of black and white stripes, with black shorts and black socks, and their away colours are yellow shirts, black shorts and yellow socks. The club's crest features a stylised "D" inherited from local side Loughborough Dynamo who were central in their reformation in 1994. Loughborough had in turn taken the name "Dynamo" and the "D" logo from Dynamo Moscow, who had toured the UK in 1945. Previously, the club crest featured a representation of a dove on a field of black and white. During Maurice Clayton's time in charge, the club were 're-branded' with the nickname 'The Raiders' complete with a crest resembling the Los Angeles Raiders, probably inspired by Charterhouse Holdings' lucrative contract to produce merchandise for the NFL.

== Notable players/managers ==
Below is a list of players/managers who fulfil one or more of the following requirements;
1. Have played/managed in the English Football League or any foreign equivalent (i.e. fully professional league)
2. Have full international caps.
3. Hold a club record.

- (Sierra Leone) Ibrahim Bah
- (England) Dale Belford
- (England) Tristan Benjamin
- (England) Jeff Blockley
- (England) Phil Boyer
- (England) Steve Burke
- (England) Neville Chamberlain
- (England) Sammy Chapman
- (England) Willie Gamble
- (Scotland) Paul Geddes
- (England) Lenny Glover
- (England) Neil Grewcock
- (England) Kevin Hector
- (Wales) Terry Hennessey (Player/Manager)
- (England) Mick Hollis
- (England) Liam Hurst
- (England) Gary Ingham
- (England) Julian Joachim
- (Northern Ireland) Jon McCarthy
- (England) Ernie Moss
- (England) David Nish
- (Northern Ireland) Martin O'Neill (Manager)
- (England) Levi Porter
- (England) Jon Stevenson
- (England) Steve Powell
- (England) John Ramshaw (Manager)
- (England) Dean Smith
- (England) Ian Storey-Moore (Player/Manager)
- (England) Colin Tartt
- (England) Simon Woodhead
- (England) Frank Wignall (Manager)
- (England) Steve Yates
- (Scotland) Alan Young
- (England) Arthur Chadburn (Manager)
- (Antigua and Barbuda) Jorrin John
- (Antigua and Barbuda) Zayn Hakeem
- (Montserrat) Massiah McDonald
- (Tanzania) Ben Starkie
