= Liam Hurst =

English footballer

Personal information
- Date of birth: 2 September 1994 (age 32)
- Place of birth: Leicester, England
- Position: Forward

Youth career
- Cambridge United

Senior career*
| Years | Team | Apps | (Gls) |
| 2012–2015 | Cambridge United | 6 | (0) |
| 2013 | → Cambridge City (loan) | 8 | (0) |
| 2013 | → Corby Town (loan) | 5 | (0) |
| 2013 | → St Neots Town (loan) | 8 | (1) |
| 2014 | → King's Lynn Town (loan) | 9 | (0) |
| 2015 | → Grantham Town (loan) | 10 | (0) |
| 2015–2016 | King's Lynn Town | 42 | (4) |
| 2016 | Coalville Town | 7 | (0) |
| 2016–202? | Shepshed Dynamo | | |
- * Club domestic league appearances and goals as of 21:30, 17 December 2019 (UTC)

Liam Hurst (born 2 September 1994) is an English footballer who plays as a forward.

== Playing career ==
=== Cambridge United ===
Hurst left Cambridge United in May 2015 having made six league appearances.

== Statistics ==
| Season | Club | Division | League | | FA Cup | | League Cup | | Other | | Total | |
| Season | Club | Division | Apps | Goals | Apps | Goals | Apps | Goals | Apps | Goals | Apps | Goals |
|---|---|---|---|---|---|---|---|---|---|---|---|---|
| 2011–12 | Cambridge United | Conference Premier | 1 | 0 | 0 | 0 | 0 | 0 | 0 | 0 | 1 | 0 |
| 2012–13 | Cambridge United | Conference Premier | 1 | 0 | 0 | 0 | 0 | 0 | 0 | 0 | 1 | 0 |
| 2013–14 | Cambridge United | Conference Premier | 0 | 0 | 0 | 0 | 0 | 0 | 0 | 0 | 0 | 0 |
| 2014–15 | Cambridge United | League Two | 4 | 0 | 0 | 0 | 0 | 0 | 0 | 0 | 4 | 0 |
| Total | | | 6 | 0 | 0 | 0 | 0 | 0 | 0 | 0 | 6 | 0 |
| Career total | | | 6 | 0 | 0 | 0 | 0 | 0 | 0 | 0 | 6 | 0 |
