= Gary Ingham =

English footballer and coach

Personal information
- Full name: Gary Ingham
- Date of birth: 9 October 1964
- Place of birth: Rotherham, England
- Date of death: 20 November 2012 (aged 48)
- Place of death: Rotherham, England
- Position: Goalkeeper

Youth career
- Rotherham United

Senior career*
Years	Team	Apps	(Gls)
1983	Kiveton Park		
- Gainsborough Trinity
- → Shepshed Charterhouse (loan)
- → Goole Town (loan)
- → Bridlington Town (loan)
- → Maltby Miners Welfare (loan)
1993–1994	Rotherham United	0	(0)
1994	Doncaster Rovers	1	(0)
1994–1997	Gainsborough Trinity		
1997	Doncaster Rovers	10	(0)
1997–1998	Stalybridge Celtic	8	(0)
- → Stocksbridge Park Steels (loan)
1998–1999	Leek Town		
1999–2001	Stalybridge Celtic	87	(0)
2001–2002	Gainsborough Trinity		
2002–2004	Belper Town		
2004–2006	Frickley Athletic		
- Grantham Town
- Ossett Albion
2007	Stocksbridge Park Steels		
- * Club domestic league appearances and goals

Gary Ingham (9 October 1964 – 20 November 2012) was an English professional footballer and coach who played as a goalkeeper. He spent most of his career in non-league football but had two spells in the Football League with Doncaster Rovers.

== Playing career ==
Born in Rotherham, began his career with hometown club Rotherham United. After a spell with Kiveton Park in August 1983, he signed for Gainsborough Trinity, where he spent loan spells at Shepshed Charterhouse, Goole Town, Bridlington Town and Maltby Miners Welfare.

He returned to Rotherham United in March 1993, moving to Doncaster Rovers in March 1994, for whom he made his Football League debut. After a spell back with Gainsborough Trinity he returned to Doncaster Rovers in August 1997, making a further 10 Football League appearances. He later played for Conference side Stalybridge Celtic; after suffering an injury he was loaned to Stocksbridge Park Steels (where he made 19 appearances) and then sold to Leek Town. He returned to Stalybridge Celtic in 1999, and then moved back to Gainsborough Trinity in 2001, his third spell with the club.

He joined Belper Town as a player-coach in June 2002, moving to Frickley Athletic in October 2004. He moved to Grantham Town in 2006, before returning to Stocksbridge Park Steels as player-assistant manager. He also played for Ossett Albion.

== Coaching career ==
Ingham was a player-coach at Belper Town, and worked as an assistant manager at Stocksbridge Park Steels. He left the club in November 2011.

== Death ==
Ingham died on 20 November 2012.
