= Paul Geddes (footballer) =

Scottish footballer

Personal information
- Date of birth: 19 April 1961 (age 65)
- Place of birth: Paisley, Scotland
- Position: Central defender

Senior career*
Years	Team	Apps	(Gls)
1979–1981	Leicester City	0	(0)
1981–1982	Hibernian	0	(0)
1981–1982	Wimbledon	2	(0)
1984–1985	Shepshed Charterhouse	?	(?)
1985–1987	VS Rugby	62	(2)
- * Club domestic league appearances and goals

Paul Geddes (born 19 April 1961 in Paisley) is a Scottish former professional footballer who played in the Football League, as a central defender.
