= Tristan Benjamin =

English footballer

Personal information
- Full name: Tristan Benjamin
- Date of birth: 1 April 1957
- Place of birth: Saint Kitts
- Height: 6 ft 0 in (1.83 m)
- Position: Defender

Senior career*
Years	Team	Apps	(Gls)
1974–1987	Notts County	311	(4)
1987–1988	Chesterfield	34	(0)
- Shepshed Charterhouse
- Corby Town
- Sutton Town
- * Club domestic league appearances and goals

Tristan Benjamin (born 1 April 1957) is an English former footballer who played the majority of his career in defence for Notts County.

Benjamin joined County as an apprentice and signed professional for them in March 1975. He made 311 league appearances for County, before moving to Chesterfield at the end of the 1987 season.

After a season at Chesterfield he moved on again playing semi-professional football for Shepshed Charterhouse, Corby Town and Sutton Town.
