= Teddy Emberton =

English footballer

Personal information
- Full name: Frederick Percival Emberton
- Date of birth: 23 June 1884
- Place of birth: Thrapston, England
- Date of death: 1957 (aged 72–73)
- Height: 5 ft 10 1/2 in (1.79 m)
- Position: Wing half

Senior career*
Years	Team	Apps	(Gls)
1901–1902	Stafford Wesleyans		
1902–1904	Stafford Rangers		
1904–1915	Notts County	365	(2)
Total		365	(2)
- * Club domestic league appearances and goals

Frederick Percival Emberton (23 June 1884 – 1957) was an English footballer who played in the Football League for Notts County.
