= Jodi Jones =

Jodi Jones may refer to:

- Jodi Jones (footballer) (born 1997), English-Maltese professional footballer who plays for Notts County as a winger
- Jodi Jones (murder victim), a Scottish teenager murdered in 2003
