= Gustave Massiah =

Gustave Massiah, or Gus, (born 1941) is a French economist, urbanist, and political analyst. He was a professor of urbanism at the French Ecole spéciale d'architecture in Paris, as well as the head of the CRID (Centre de recherche et d'information sur le développement).

Gustave Massiah is one of the founders of the French Attac, of which he had been its vice-president until 2006, and he remains a member of its scientific council.

== Books ==
- 1975, La Crise de l’impérialisme, with Samir Amin, Alexandre Faire and Mahmoud Hussein, Editions de Minuit, Paris
- 1988, Villes en développement – Essai sur les politiques urbaines dans le tiers monde, with Jean-François Tribillon, La Découverte, Paris
- 2000, Une économie au service de l’homme, from ATTAC Summer University August 2000. Gustave Massiah Report: «De l’ajustement structurel au respect des droits humains », Éditions Mille et une nuits.
- 2004, Le développement a-t-l un avenir ? Pour une économie solidaire et économe, with and directed by Jean-Marie Harribey, Éditions Mille et une nuits.
- 2011, Une stratégie de l'altermondialisme, with Élise Massiah, Collection : Cahiers libres, La Découverte, ISBN 9782707165411.
