= Massiah McDonald =

Montserratian footballer (born 1990)

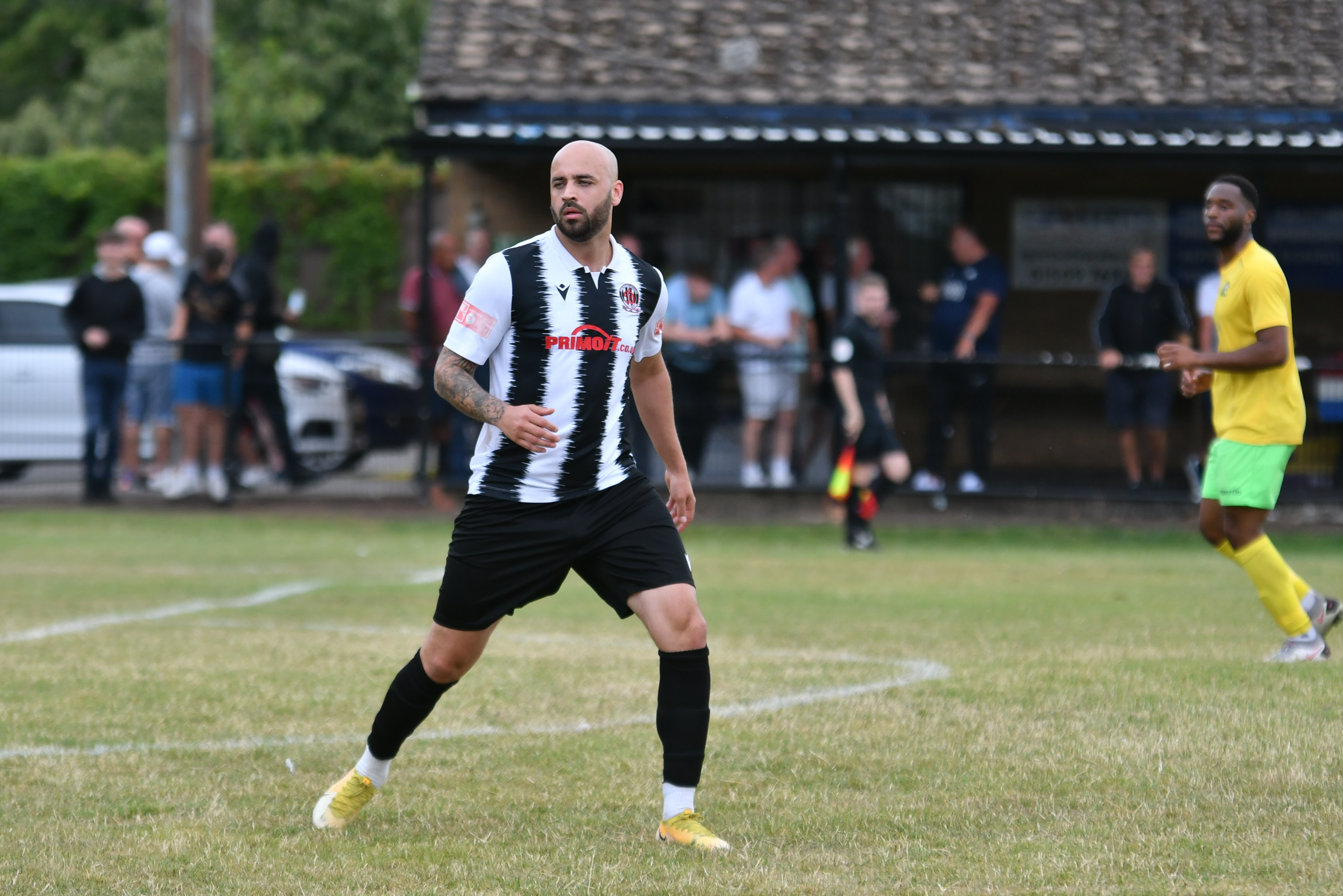

Personal information
- Full name: Julian Massiah McDonald
- Date of birth: 20 August 1990 (age 36)
- Place of birth: Nottingham, England
- Height: 1.88 m (6 ft 2 in)
- Position: Forward

Team information
- Current team: Radford

Youth career
- –2005: Notts County
- 2005–2007: Alfreton Town

Senior career*
Years	Team	Apps	(Gls)
2007–2008	Alfreton Town	3	(1)
2008–2010	Rainworth Miners Welfare	58	(31)
2011–2012	Carlton Town	35	(22)
2012–2013	Worksop Town	49	(21)
2012	→ Matlock Town (loan)		
2013	Matlock Town	38	(27)
2013	Grantham Town	5	(0)
2013–2014	King's Lynn Town	16	(4)
2014	Matlock Town		
2014–2015	Alfreton Town	14	(2)
2015	→ Boston United (loan)	4	(0)
2015–2016	Bradford Park Avenue	6	(0)
2015	→ Mickleover Sports (loan)	7	(4)
2015	→ Rushall Olympic (loan)	6	(3)
2015–2016	→ Corby Town (loan)	6	(1)
2016	→ Corby Town (loan)	8	(0)
2016–2018	Coalville Town	51	(12)
2017	→ Stafford Rangers (loan)		
2018–2019	Barwell	14	(6)
2019	Rushall Olympic	16	(0)
2019	AFC Rushden & Diamonds	6	(1)
2019	Ilkeston Town	7	(0)
2020	Newark Flowserve		
2020–2021	Barwell	6	(0)
2021	Gresley Rovers	3	(0)
2021	Nuneaton Borough	8	(1)
2021–2023	Shepshed Dynamo	15	(1)
2023	→ Eastwood Community (loan)	4	(1)
2023	Rugby Town	3	(2)
2023	Basford United	5	(0)
2024–	Radford		

International career^{‡}
2015–2023	Montserrat	14	(0)
- * Club domestic league appearances and goals as of 14:28, 14 July 2024 (UTC) ‡ National team caps and goals as of 21:11, 14 June 2022 (UTC)

Julian Massiah McDonald (born 20 August 1990) is a Montserratian footballer. He made his international debut for Montserrat in March 2015.

== Career ==
=== Club career ===
Following his release from Notts County as a youngster, McDonald began his non-league career with Alfreton Town, breaking into the first team at the age of 16 in the 2006–07 season after two years in the youth set-up. Making three appearances in the first team, Scorong once. He joined Rainworth Milners Welfare in 2008, and spent two years with the club. Departing the club in May 2010, the forward spent a season with Carlton Town, scoring 22 times in 35 appearances.

Completing a switch to Worksop Town in August 2011, McDonald joined the club for 18 months. His spell also included a one-month loan at Matlock Town in October 2011, but he made the move permanent a month later before remaining with the club until the end of the season. He scored nine times in 30 games for the Gladiators.

On 8 August 2014, McDonald re-joined Alfreton Town at the age of 23. Spending a single season with club, he also had a one-month loan away from North Street when joining Boston United in late January 2015. However, he failed to score in four appearances for the Pilgrims, while scoring twice for Alfreton throughout the season.

In May 2015, McDonald dropped down a division in order to join Bradford Park Avenue. Joining Mickleover Sports on a one-month loan in September 2015, he scored on his debut in a 2–0 win over Buxton. McDonald then signed for Rushall Olympic on a one-month loan in October 2015, and scored two goals on his debut.

Initially joining Corby Town on a one-month loan in December 2015, McDonald opted for a second spell with the Steelmen a few weeks after, and headed to Steel Park on loan for the remainder of the season.

On 21 May 2016, Coalville Town announced that McDonald had signed a one-year deal with the club. He signed for AFC Rushden & Diamonds in July 2019.

On 14 December 2021, McDonald signed for Shepshed Dynamo.

=== International career ===
McDonald made his international debut for Montserrat on 27 March 2015, featuring in a 2–1 defeat to Curaçao during 2018 World Cup qualification. He made his second appearance three days later, in a 2–2 draw with Curaçao in the same competition. After 3 years away from the national team, he returned to action in October 2018 in a 1–0 win over Belize.
