= 2012 in association football =

The following are the association football events of the year 2012 throughout the world.

== Events ==
=== Men ===
==== Senior ====
- Men's Football Tournament at the 2012 Summer Olympics in London, United Kingdom
  - (gold) Mexico
  - (silver) Brazil
  - (bronze) South Korea
  - 4th Japan
- January 21 – February 12: 2012 African Cup of Nations in Gabon and Equatorial Guinea
  - (gold) Zambia
  - (silver) Ivory Coast
  - (bronze) Mali
  - 4th Ghana
- March 8 – March 19: 2012 AFC Challenge Cup in Nepal
  - (gold) North Korea
  - (silver) Turkmenistan
  - (bronze) Philippines
  - 4th Palestine
- June 1 – June 3: 2012 Baltic Cup in Estonia
  - (gold) Latvia
  - (silver) Finland
  - (bronze) Estonia
  - 4th Lithuania
- June 3 – June 11: 2012 OFC Nations Cup in Fiji
  - (gold) Tahiti
  - (silver) New Caledonia
  - (bronze) New Zealand
  - 4th Solomon Islands
- June 8 – July 1: UEFA Euro 2012 in Poland and Ukraine
  - (gold) Spain
  - (silver) Italy
  - (bronze) Portugal and Germany
- 22 June – 6 July 2012: 2012 Arab Nations Cup in Saudi Arabia
  - (gold) Morocco
  - (silver) Libya
  - (bronze) Iraq
  - 4th Saudi Arabia
- September 25 – September 29: 2012 Philippine Peace Cup in the Philippines
  - (gold) Philippines
  - (silver) Chinese Taipei
  - (bronze) Guam
  - 4th Macau
- September 22 – October 2: 2012 Nehru Cup in India
  - (gold) India
  - (silver) Cameroon
  - (bronze) Maldives
  - 4th Syria
- November 24 – December 8: 2012 CECAFA Cup in Uganda
  - (gold) Uganda
  - (silver) Kenya
  - (bronze) Zanzibar
  - 4th Tanzania
- November 24 – December 22: 2012 AFF Suzuki Cup in Malaysia and Thailand
  - (gold) Singapore
  - (silver) Thailand
- December 7 – December 16: 2012 Caribbean Cup in Antigua and Barbuda
  - (gold) Cuba
  - (silver) Trinidad and Tobago
  - (bronze) Haiti
  - 4th Martinique
- December 8 – December 20: 2012 West Asian Football Federation Championship in Kuwait
  - (gold) Syria
  - (silver) Iraq
  - (bronze) Oman
  - 4th Bahrain

==== Youth ====
- 3 July – 15 July: 2012 UEFA European Under-19 Football Championship in Estonia
  - (gold) Spain
  - (silver) Greece
- 22 September – 6 October: 2012 AFC U-16 Championship in Iran
  - (gold) Uzbekistan
  - (silver) Japan
- 3 November – 17 November: 2012 AFC U-19 Championship in the United Arab Emirates
  - (gold) South Korea
  - (silver) Iraq

=== Women ===
- Women's Tournament at the 2012 Summer Olympics in London, United Kingdom
  - (gold) United States
  - (silver) Japan
  - (bronze) Canada
  - 4th: France
- 20 January – 5 February: 2012 South American Under-20 Women's Football Championship in Brazil
  - (gold) Brazil
  - (silver) Argentina
  - (bronze) Colombia
  - 4th: Paraguay
- 29 February – 7 March: 2012 Algarve Cup in Portugal
  - (gold) Germany
  - (silver) Japan
  - (bronze) United States
  - 4th: Sweden
- August 18 – September 9 — 2012 FIFA U-20 Women's World Cup in Japan
  - (gold) United States
  - (silver) Germany
  - (bronze) Japan
  - 4th: Nigeria
- September 22 – October 13 — 2012 FIFA U-17 Women's World Cup in Azerbaijan
  - (gold) France
  - (silver) North Korea
  - (bronze) Ghana
  - 4th: Germany

== News ==
- In 2012, Major League Soccer in the United States and Canada added its 19th team, confirmed in 2010 as the Montreal Impact.
- CONCACAF changes the format of its club continental cup in the 2012–13 CONCACAF Champions League, taking out the preliminary round and putting the 24 teams in 8 groups of 3 teams each.
- January 30 – Women's Professional Soccer in the U.S. announced that it would cancel its 2012 season, with hopes of returning in 2013. The cancellation was the latest fallout from conflict with team owner Dan Borislow that consumed much of the 2011 season and extended into the offseason.
- May 18 – Women's Professional Soccer folded.
- November 21 – The United States Soccer Federation (U.S. Soccer) announced that it would launch a new women's professional league in 2013. The league, as yet unnamed, will have eight teams at launch, four of which have ties to former WPS teams. U.S. Soccer, the Canadian Soccer Association, and the Mexican Football Federation will pay the league salaries for many of their respective national team players, and U.S. Soccer will also house the league offices.
- December 9 – After scoring twice in a La Liga match against Real Betis, Lionel Messi establishes the new world record for most goals scored in a single calendar year, with 91 – surpassing Gerd Müller's 85 in 1972.
- December 15 – U.S. Soccer officially announces that its top-level women's league to be launched in 2013 will be known as the National Women's Soccer League.
- December 17 – The South African Football Association suspends its president, Kirsten Nematandani, amid a FIFA probe into match-fixing allegations in several friendly matches in the lead-up to the 2010 FIFA World Cup. The exhibition games investigated by the FIFA Ethics Committee included a friendly between South Africa and Guatemala with the officiating of Niger's referee Ibrahim Chaibou. Chaibou was later banned for life in January 2019 for corrupting this match, among others. Nemtandani was banned for five years in December 2016.

== 2011–12 Egyptian Premier League ==
The 2011–2012 season, the league increased from 16 to 19 teams due to no relegation in the 2010–11 season as a result of the 2011 Egyptian revolution. Three teams were promoted from the second division.

Following the Port Said Stadium disaster on 1 February 2012, the season was suspended. At that time, teams had played between 14 and 17 games out of 30. Haras El-Hodood was in first place with a 12–1–1 record. This result was considered a significant surprise by Al Ahram. On 10 March 2012, a decision was reached to cancel the remainder of the season.

== Fixed dates for national team matches ==
Scheduled international matches per their International Match Calendar. Also known as FIFA International Day/Date(s).

- 29 February
- 22 August
- 8-12 September
- 13-17 October
- 14 November

== Continental champions ==
=== Men ===
Region	Tournament	Champion	Title	Last honor
AFC (Asia)	2012 AFC Champions League	(South Korea) Ulsan Hyundai	1st	
AFC (Asia)	2012 AFC Cup	Al-Kuwait	2nd	2009
AFC (Asia)	2012 AFC President's Cup	(Tajikistan) Istiqlol	1st	
CAF (Africa)	2012 CAF Champions League	(Egypt) Al-Ahly	7th	2008
CAF (Africa)	2012 CAF Confederation Cup	(Republic of the Congo) AC Léopards	1st	
CAF (Africa)	2012 CAF Super Cup	(Morocco) Maghreb de Fes	1st	
CONCACAF (North and Central America, Caribbean)	2011–12 CONCACAF Champions League	(Mexico) Monterrey	2nd	2011
CONCACAF (North and Central America, Caribbean)	2012 CFU Club Championship	(Trinidad and Tobago) Caledonia AIA	1st	
CONMEBOL (South America)	2012 Copa Libertadores	(Brazil) Corinthians	1st	
CONMEBOL (South America)	2012 Copa Sudamericana	(Brazil) São Paulo	1st	
CONMEBOL (South America)	2012 Recopa Sudamericana	(Brazil) Santos	1st	
OFC (Oceania)	2011–12 O-League	(New Zealand) Auckland City	4th	2011
UEFA (Europe)	2011–12 UEFA Champions League	(England) Chelsea	1st	
UEFA (Europe)	2011–12 UEFA Europa League	(Spain) Atlético Madrid	2nd	2010
UEFA (Europe)	2012 UEFA Super Cup	(Spain) Atlético Madrid	2nd	2010
FIFA (Worldwide)	2012 FIFA Club World Cup	(Brazil) Corinthians	2nd	2000

=== Women ===
Region	Tournament	Champion	Title	Last honor
CONMEBOL (South America)	2012 Copa Libertadores Femenina	(Chile) Colo-Colo (women)	1st	
UEFA (Europe)	2011–12 UEFA Women's Champions League	(France) Olympique Lyonnais	2nd	2010–11 UEFA Women's Champions League
Worldwide	2012 International Women's Club Championship	(France) Olympique Lyonnais	1st	

== Domestic Champions ==
=== AFC nations ===
Nation	League	Champion	Title	Last honor
Afghanistan	2012 Afghan Premier League	Toofaan Harirod	1st	
Australia	2011–12 A-League	Brisbane Roar	2nd	2010–11
Bahrain	2011–12 Bahrain First Division League	Riffa	10th	2004–05
Bangladesh	2012 Bangladesh Football Premier League	Abahani Limited	4th	2009–10
Bhutan	2012 A-Division	Druk Pol	1st	
Brunei	Did not hold			
Cambodia	2012 Cambodian League	Boeung Ket Rubber Field	1st	
China	2012 Chinese Super League	Guangzhou Evergrande	2nd	2011
Chinese Taipei	2012 Intercity Football League	Taiwan Power Company	4th	2011
Guam	2011–12 Guam Men's Soccer League	Quality Distributors	5th	2009–10
Hong Kong	2011–12 Hong Kong First Division League	Kitchee	5th	2010–11
India	2011–12 I-League	Dempo	3rd	2009–10
Indonesia	2011–12 Indonesian Premier League	Semen Padang	1st	
Indonesia	2011–12 Indonesia Super League	Sriwijaya	1st	
Iran	2011–12 Iran Pro League	Sepahan Isfahan	4th	2010–11
Iraq	2011–12 Iraqi Elite League	Erbil	4th	2008−09
Jordan	2011–12 Jordan League	Al-Faisaly	32nd	2009−10
Japan	2012 J. League Division 1	Sanfrecce Hiroshima	6th	1970
North Korea	2012 DPR Korea League	April 25	14th	2011
South Korea	2012 K-League	Seoul	2nd	2010
Kuwait	2011–12 Kuwaiti Premier League	Qadsia	15th	2010–11
Kyrgyzstan	2012 Kyrgyzstan League	Dordoi Bishkek	8th	2011
Lebanon	2011–12 Lebanese Premier League	Al-Safa'	1st	
Laos	2012 Lao League	Lao Police Club	1st	
Macau	2012 Campeonato da 1ª Divisão do Futebol	Ka I	3rd	2011
Malaysia	2012 Malaysia Super League	Kelantan	2nd	2011
Maldives	2012 Dhivehi League	New Radiant	2nd	2006
Mongolia	2012 Mongolian Premier League	Erchim	7th	2008
Myanmar	2012 Myanmar National League	Yangon United	2nd	2011
Nepal	2011–12 Nepal National League	Nepal Police Club	4th	2011
Oman	2011–12 Omani League	Fanja	8th	1990−91
Pakistan	Did not hold			
Philippines	2012 United Football League Division 1	Global	1st	
Qatar	2011–12 Qatar Stars League	Lekhwiya	2nd	2010–11
Saudi Arabia	2011–12 Saudi Professional League	Al Shabab	6th	2005–06
Singapore	2012 S.League	Tampines Rovers	4th	2011
Sri Lanka	2011–12 Sri Lanka Football Premier League	Ratnam	5th	2007–08
Syria	2011–12 Syrian Premier League	Al-Shorta	3rd	2010–11
Tajikistan	2012 Tajik League	Ravshan Kulob	1st	
Thailand	2012 Thai Premier League	Muangthong United	3rd	2010
Timor-Leste	Did not hold			
Turkmenistan	2012 Ýokary Liga	Balkan	4th	2011
United Arab Emirates	2011–12 UAE Pro-League	Al Ain	10th	2003–04
Uzbekistan	2012 Uzbek League	Pakhtakor Tashkent	9th	2007
Vietnam	2012 V-League	SHB Đà Nẵng	2nd	2009
Yemen	2011–12 Yemeni League	Shaab Ibb	3rd	2003–04

=== UEFA nations ===
Nation	League	Champion	Title	Last honor
Albania	2011–12 Albanian Superliga	Skënderbeu Korçë	3rd	2011
Andorra	2011–12 Primera Divisió	FC Lusitanos	1st	—
Austria	2011–12 Austrian Football Bundesliga	FC Red Bull Salzburg	7th	2010
Azerbaijan	2011–12 Azerbaijan Premier League	Neftchi Baku	7th	2011
Belarus	2012 Belarusian Premier League	BATE Borisov	8th	2011
Belgium	2011–12 Jupiler League	Anderlecht	31st	2010
Bosnia and Herzegovina	2011–12 Premijer Liga	Željezničar	5th	2010
Bulgaria	2011–12 A PFG	Ludogorets Razgrad	1st	—
Croatia	2011–12 Prva HNL	Dinamo Zagreb	13th^{[A]}	2010
Cyprus	2011–12 Cypriot First Division	AEL	6th	1968
Czech Republic	2011–12 Gambrinus liga	Slovan Liberec	3rd	2006
Denmark	2011–12 Danish Superliga	Copenhagen	9th	2010
England	2011–12 Premier League	Manchester City	3rd	1968
Estonia	2012 Meistriliiga	Nõmme Kalju	1st	-
Faroe Islands	2012 Vodafonedeildin	B36 Tórshavn	8th	2005
Finland	2012 Veikkausliiga	HJK Helsinki	24th	2010
France	2011–12 Ligue 1	Montpellier HSC	1st	—
(Georgia (country)) Georgia	2011–12 Umaglesi Liga	Zestafoni	2nd	2011
Germany	2011–12 Fußball-Bundesliga	Borussia Dortmund	8th	2011
Greece	2011–12 Super League Greece	Olympiacos	38th	2011
Hungary	2011–12 NB I	Debreceni VSC	6th	2010
Iceland	2012 Úrvalsdeild	KR Reykjavík	25th	2003
(Republic of Ireland) Ireland	2012 League of Ireland	Sligo Rovers	3rd	1977
Israel	2011–12 Israeli Premier League	Ironi Kiryat Shmona	1st^{[{{{2}}}]}	—
Italy	2011–12 Serie A	Juventus	28th	2003
Kazakhstan	2012 Kazakhstan Premier League	Shakhter Karagandy	2nd	2011
Latvia	2012 Latvian Higher League	Ventspils	4th	2008
Lithuania	2012 A Lyga	Ekranas	6th^{[D]}	2010
Luxembourg	2011–12 Luxembourg National Division	F91 Dudelange	9th	2009
(North Macedonia) Macedonia	2011–12 First Macedonian Football League	Škendija	1st	—
Malta	2011–12 Maltese Premier League	Valletta	20th	2008
Moldova	2011–12 Moldovan National Division	Dacia Chişinău	1st	—
Montenegro	2011–12 Montenegrin First League	FK Budućnost	2nd	2008
Netherlands	2011–12 Eredivisie	Ajax	31st	2011
Northern Ireland	2011–12 IFA Premiership	Linfield	50th	2010
Norway	2012 Tippeligaen	Molde	1st	—
Poland	2011–12 Ekstraklasa	Śląsk Wrocław	2nd	1977
Portugal	2011–12 Primeira Liga	Porto	25th	2009
Romania	2011–12 Liga I	CFR Cluj	3rd	2010
Russia	2011–12 Russian Premier League	Zenit St. Petersburg	4th	2010
San Marino	2011–12 Campionato Sammarinese di Calcio	Tre Penne	1st	—
Scotland	2011–12 Scottish Premier League	Celtic	43rd	2008
Serbia	2011–12 Serbian SuperLiga	Partizan	24th	2010–11
Slovakia	2011–12 Slovak First Football League	Žilina	6th	2009–10
Slovenia	2011–12 Slovenian PrvaLiga	Maribor	9th	2009
Spain	2011–12 La Liga	Real Madrid	32nd	2008
Sweden	2012 Allsvenskan	Elfsborg	6th	2006
Switzerland	2011–12 Swiss Super League	Basel	14th	2010
Turkey	2011–12 Süper Lig	Galatasaray	18th	2008
Ukraine	2011–12 Ukrainian Premier League	Shakhtar Donetsk	6th	2010–11
Wales	2011–12 Welsh Premier League	The New Saints	6th	2009–10

=== CAF nations ===
Nation	League	Champion	Title	Last honor
Algeria	2011–12 Algerian Ligue Professionnelle 1	ES Sétif	5th	2008–09
Angola	2012 Girabola	CRD Libolo	2nd	2011
Benin	2011–12 Benin Premier League	ASPAC FC	2nd	2009–10
Botswana	2011–12 Mascom Premier League	Mochudi Centre Chiefs	2nd	2007–08
Burkina Faso	2012 Burkinabé Premier League	ASFA Yennenga	12th	2011
Cameroon	2011–12 MTN Elite One	US Douala	5th	1990
Cape Verde	2012 Campeonato Nacional de Cabo Verde	Sporting Clube da Praia	9th	2009
Central African Republic	2012 Central African Republic League	Olympic Real de Bangui	10th	2010
Chad	2012 Chad Premier League	Gazelle	2nd	2009
Comoros	2012 Comoros Premier League	Djabal Club	1st	n/a
(Republic of the Congo) Congo	2012 Congo Premier League	AC Léopards	1st	n/a
(Democratic Republic of the Congo) Congo DR	2012 Linafoot	TP Mazembe	12th	2011
(Ivory Coast) Côte d'Ivoire	2012 Côte d'Ivoire Premier Division	Séwé Sports de San Pedro	1st	n/a
Djibouti	2011–12 Djibouti Premier League	AS Port	3rd	2010–11
Egypt	2011–12 Egyptian Premier League	Cancelled after Port Said Stadium disaster		
Equatorial Guinea	2012 Equatoguinean Premier League	Sony Elá Nguema	14th	2011
Eritrea	2012 Eritrean Premier League	n/a (possibly did not hold)		
Ethiopia	2011–12 Ethiopian Premier League	Saint George SA	22nd	2009–10
Gabon	2012 Gabon Championnat National D1	CF Mounana	1st	n/a
(The Gambia) Gambia	2012 GFA League First Division	Real de Banjul	9th	2007
Ghana	2011–12 Ghanaian Premier League	Asante Kotoko	21st	2007–08
Guinea	2012 Guinée Championnat National	Horoya AC	11th	2011
Guinea-Bissau	2012 Campeonato Nacional da Guiné-Bissau	Cancelled due to financial problems		
Kenya	2012 Kenyan Premier League	Tusker	10th	2011
Lesotho	2012 Lesotho Premier League	Lesotho Correctional Services	6th	2011
Liberia	2011–12 Liberian Premier League	LISCR	2nd	2010–11
Libya	2011–12 Libyan Premier League	Did not hold		
Madagascar	2012 THB Champions League	AS Adema	3rd	2006
Malawi	2011–12 Malawi Premier Division	Silver Strikers	6th	2009–10
Mali	2012 Malian Première Division	Djoliba AC	22nd	2009
Mauritania	2011–12 Mauritanian Premier League	ASC Tevragh-Zeïna	1st	n/a
Mauritius	2012 Mauritian League	Pamplemousses	3rd	2010
Morocco	2011–12 Botola	Moghreb Tétouan	1st	n/a
Mozambique	2012 Moçambola	Maxaquene	5th	2003
Namibia	2011–12 Namibia Premier League	Black Africa	7th	2010–11
Niger	2012 Niger Premier League	Olympique de Niamey	12th	1999
Nigeria	2012 Nigeria Premier League	Kano Pillars	2nd	2008
Réunion	2012 Réunion Premier League	SS Saint-Louisienne	16th	2002
Rwanda	2011–12 Primus National Football League	A.P.R.	13th	2010–11
São Tomé and Príncipe	2012 São Tomé and Príncipe Championship	Sporting Clube do Príncipe	2nd	2011
Senegal	2011–12 Senegal Premier League	Casa Sport	1st	n/a
Seychelles	2012 Seychelles First Division	St Michel United	11th	2011
Sierra Leone	2011–12 Sierra Leone National Premier League	Diamond Stars	1st	n/a
Somalia	2012 Somalia League	Elman	9th	2011
South Africa	2011–12 Premier Soccer League	Orlando Pirates	4th	2010–11
Sudan	2012 Sudan Premier League	Al-Hilal Omdurman	27th	2010
(Eswatini) Swaziland	2011–12 Swazi Premier League	Mbabane Swallows	4th	2004–05
Tanzania	2011–12 Tanzanian Premier League	Simba	18th	2009–10
Togo	2011–12 Togolese Championnat National	Dynamic Togolais	6th	2003–04
Tunisia	2011–12 Tunisian Ligue Professionnelle 1	ES Tunis	25th	2010–11
Uganda	2011–12 Ugandan Super League	Express	6th	1996
Zambia	2012 Zambian Premier League	Zanaco	6th	2009
Zanzibar	2012 Zanzibar Premier League	Super Falcon	1st	n/a
Zimbabwe	2012 Zimbabwe Premier Soccer League	Dynamos	20th	2011

=== CONCACAF nations ===
Nation	League	Champion	Title	Last honor
Costa Rica	2012 Primera División Verano	Herediano	22nd	1992–93
Costa Rica	2012 Primera División Invierno	Alajuelense	28th	2011 Invierno
El Salvador	2012 Primera División Clausura	Águila	5th	2006 Clausura
El Salvador	2012 Primera División Apertura	Isidro Metapán	7th	2011 Apertura
Honduras	2012 Liga Nacional Clausura	Olimpia	25th	2011 Apertura
Honduras	2012 Liga Nacional Apertura	Olimpia	26th	2012 Clausura
Mexico	2012 Primera División Clausura	Santos Laguna	4th	2008 Clausura
Mexico	2012 Liga MX Apertura	Tijuana	1st	n/a
Trinidad and Tobago	2011–12 TT Pro League	W Connection	4th	2005
United States/ Canada	2012 Major League Soccer	Los Angeles Galaxy	4th	2011

=== CONMEBOL nations ===
Nation	League	Champion	Title	Last honor
Argentina	2012 Primera División Clausura	Arsenal	1st	
Argentina	2012 Primera División Inicial	Vélez Sársfield	10th	2012 Clausura
Bolivia	2012 Liga Profesional Clausura	The Strongest	9th	2011 Apertura
Bolivia	2012 Liga Profesional Apertura	The Strongest	10th	2012 Clausura
Brazil	2012 Campeonato Brasileiro Série A	Fluminense	4th	2010
Chile	2012 Primera División Apertura	Universidad de Chile	16th	2011 Clausura
Chile	2012 Primera División Clausura	Huachipato	2nd	1974
Colombia	2012 Primera A Apertura	Santa Fe	7th	1975
Colombia	2012 Primera A Finalización	Millonarios	14th	1998
Ecuador	2012 Campeonato Ecuatoriano Serie A	Barcelona	14th	1997
Paraguay	2012 Primera División Apertura	Cerro Porteño	29th	2009 Apertura
Paraguay	2012 Primera División Clausura	Libertad	16th	2010 Clausura
Peru	2012 Torneo Descentralizado	Sporting Cristal	16th	2005
Uruguay	2011–12 Primera División	Nacional	44th	2011
Venezuela	2011–12 Primera División	Deportivo Lara	1st	

=== OFC nations ===
Nation	League	Champion	Title	Last honor
Cook Islands	2012 Cook Islands Round Cup	Tupapa Maraerenga	10th	2011
Fiji	2012 Fiji National Football League	Ba	19th	2011
New Caledonia	2012 New Caledonia Division Honneur	AS Magenta	7th	2009
New Zealand	2011–12 ASB Premiership	Waitakere United	4th	2010–11
Papua New Guinea	2012 National Soccer League	Hekari United	6th	2010-11
Solomon Islands	2012 S-League	Solomon Warriors FC	1st	
(French Polynesia) Tahiti	2011–12 Tahiti First Division	Dragon	1st	
Tonga	2012 Tonga Major League	Lotoha'apai United	13th	2010–11
Vanuatu	2012 National Soccer League	Amicale FC	3rd	2011

== Second, third, fourth, and fifth leagues ==
=== CONCACAF nations ===
Nation	League	Champion	Final score	Second place	Title	Last honour
Canada	2012 Première Ligue de soccer du Québec	FC St-Léonard		FC L'Assomption	1st	
Canada	2012 Canadian Soccer League	Toronto Croatia	1–0	Montreal Impact Academy	5th	2011

== Deaths ==
=== January ===
- January 1 - Gary Ablett, English footballer (born 1965)
- January 2 - Ioan Drăgan, Romanian footballer (born 1965)
- January 2 - Paulo Rodrigues da Silva, Brazilian footballer (born 1986)
- January 3 - Juan Escudero, Spanish footballer (born 1920)
- January 3 - Willi Entenmann, German footballer (born 1943)
- January 6 - Harry Fearnley, English footballer (born 1923)
- January 8 - Graham Rathbone, Welsh footballer (born 1942)
- January 9 - Bill Dickie, Scottish football administrator (born 1929)
- January 10 - Cliff Portwood, English footballer (born 1937)
- January 10 – Alfred Pyka, German international footballer (born 1934)
- January 13 - Lefter Küçükandonyadis, Turkish Olympic footballer (born 1925)
- January 14 - Zelemkhan Zangiyev, Russian footballer (born 1974)
- January 16 - Juan Carlos, Spanish footballer (born 1945)
- January 20 - Walter Whitehurst, English footballer (born 1934)
- January 21 - Ernie Gregory, English footballer (born 1921)
- January 21 - Jeffrey Ntuka, South African footballer (born 1985)
- January 24 - Pierre Sinibaldi, French footballer (born 1924)
- January 27 - Juan Sarrachini, Argentine footballer (born 1946)
- January 31 - Stefano Angeleri, Italian footballer (born 1926)
- January 31 - Sid Ottewell, English footballer (born 1919)

=== February ===
- February 1 – Ladislav Kuna, Slovak football player and manager (born 1947).
- February 4 - Pongphan Wongsuwan, Thai football manager (born 1951)
- February 6 - Juan Vicente Lezcano, Paraguayan football defender (born 1937)
- February 8 - Enrique Moreno Bellver, Spanish footballer (born 1963)
- February 12 - Malcolm Devitt, English footballer (born 1937)
- February 13 - Eamonn Deacy, Irish footballer (born 1958)
- February 13 - Sansón, Spanish footballer (born 1924)
- February 14 - Tom McAnearney, Scottish footballer (born 1933)
- February 14 - Alfredo Vega, Paraguayan footballer (born 1935)
- February 16 - John Ritchie, English footballer (born 1944)
- February 17 - Jordan da Costa, Brazilian footballer (born 1932)
- February 18 - Zvezdan Čebinac, Serbian footballer (born 1939)
- February 22 - Thabang Lebese, South African footballer (born 1973)
- February 23 - Peter King, English footballer (born 1964)
- February 26 - Árpád Fekete, Hungarian footballer (born 1921)
- February 27 - Armand Penverne, French footballer (born 1926)
- February 28 - Jaime Graça, Portuguese footballer (born 1942)
- February 29 - Karl Kodat, Austrian footballer (born 1943)

=== March ===
- March 1 - Henryk Bałuszyński, Polish footballer (born 1972)
- March 1 - Altamir Heitor Martins, Brazilian footballer (born 1980)
- March 2 - Gerry Bridgwood, English footballer (born 1944)
- March 6 - Marcos Alonso Imaz, Spanish footballer (born 1933)
- March 7 - Marcel Mouchel, French footballer (born 1927)
- March 7 - Włodzimierz Smolarek, Polish footballer (born 1957)
- March 7 - Ramaz Urushadze, Georgian footballer (born 1939)
- March 8 - Jens Petersen, Danish footballer (born 1941)
- March 9 - Brian Bromley, English footballer (born 1946)
- March 12 - Timo Konietzka, German footballer (first Bundesliga goal) (born 1938)
- March 13 - Amusa Shittu, Nigerian footballer (born 1937)
- March 14 - Ray Barlow, English footballer (born 1926)
- March 16 - Estanislau Basora, Spanish footballer (born 1926)
- March 19 - Karl-Heinz Spickenagel, German footballer (born 1932)
- March 23 - Péter Pázmándy, Hungarian footballer (born 1938)
- March 28 - Brian Philips, English footballer (born 1931)
- March 30 - Kees Guyt, Dutch footballer (born 1953)
- March 30 - Francesco Mancini, Italian footballer (born 1968)

=== April ===
- April 1 – Giorgio Chinaglia, Italian football player and manager (born 1947).
- April 3 - Airton Pavilhão, Brazilian footballer (born 1934)
- April 3 - José María Zárraga, Spanish footballer (born 1930)
- April 4 - Dubravko Pavličić, Croatian footballer (born 1967)
- April 5 - Jimmy Lawlor, Irish footballer (born 1933)
- April 6 - Larry Canning, English footballer (born 1925)
- April 6 - Dermot Hannafin (Snr), Gaelic footballer
- April 8 - John Egan, Gaelic footballer (born 1952)
- April 10 - Erdoğan Arıca, Turkish footballer (born 1954)
- April 12 - Kellon Baptiste, Grenadian footballer (born 1973)
- April 12 - Manfred Orzessek, German footballer (born 1933)
- April 14 - Lee Kyung-hwan, South Korean footballer (born 1988)
- April 14 - Eddie May, English footballer (born 1943)
- April 14 – Piermario Morosini, Italian football player (born 1986).
- April 15 - Samir Said, Kuwaiti footballer (born 1963)
- April 18 - Arthur Bottom, English footballer (born 1930)
- April 20 - Alfie Biggs, English footballer (born 1936)
- April 21 - Brian Heward, English footballer (born 1935)
- April 28 - Dudley Peake, Welsh footballer (born 1934)
- April 30 - Giannis Gravanis, Greek footballer (born 1958)

=== June ===
- June 21 – Ramaz Shengelia, Soviet Georgian player, played in the 1982 FIFA World Cup (born 1957).

=== July ===
- July 19 – Hans Nowak, German footballer (born 1937).
- July 31 – Alfredo Ramos, Brazilian defender, squad member of Brazil at the 1954 FIFA World Cup. (87)

=== August ===
- August 1 - Aldo Maldera, Italian footballer (58)
- August 2 - Bernd Meier, German footballer (40)
- August 6 - Boris Razinsky, Russian footballer (79)
- August 6 - Godfried van den Boer, Belgian footballer (78)
- August 8 - Surya Lesmana, Indonesian footballer (68)
- August 9 - Erol Togay, Turkish footballer (62)
- August 12 - Jackie Watters, Scottish footballer
- August 15 - Elson Iazegi Beyruth, Brazilian footballer (70)
- August 17 - Panos Markovic, Greek footballer (87)
- August 20 - Len Quested, English footballer (87)
- August 22 - Houcine Anafal, Moroccan footballer (59)
- August 24 - Krum Yanev, Bulgarian footballer (83)
- August 24 – Félix Miélli Venerando, Brazilian goalkeeper, winner of the 1970 FIFA World Cup. (74)
- August 25 - Florencio Amarilla, Paraguayan footballer (77)
- August 25 - Emilio Pacione, Scottish footballer
- August 26 - Alan Steen, English footballer (90)
- August 27 - Antoine Redin, French footballer (77)
- August 27 - Ivica Horvat, Croatian footballer (86)

=== September ===
- September 4 - Milan Vukelić, Serbian footballer (born 1936)
- September 5 - Ediz Bahtiyaroğlu, Turkish footballer (born 1986)
- September 6 - Oscar Rossi, Argentine footballer (born 1930)
- September 7 - Abdul Ghafoor, Pakistani footballer (born 1938)
- September 8 - Adolf Bechtold, German footballer (born 1926)
- September 9 - Ron Tindall, English footballer (born 1935)
- September 11 - Rolf Bjørn Backe, Norwegian footballer (born 1934)
- September 11 - Sergio Livingstone, Chilean footballer (born 1920)
- September 12 - Jimmy Andrews, Scottish footballer (born 1927)
- September 14 - Frank Dudley, English footballer (born 1925)
- September 15 - Predrag Brzaković, Serbian footballer (born 1964)
- September 15 - Jean-Louis Heinrich, French footballer (born 1943)
- September 17 - Bafo Biyela, South African footballer (born 1981)
- September 18 - Jorge Manicera, Uruguayan footballer (born 1938)
- September 18 - Olinto Sampaio Rubini, Mexican footballer (born 1934)
- September 19 - Rino Ferrario, Italian footballer (born 1926)
- September 20 - Michel Pech, French footballer (born 1946)
- September 21 - Len Weare, Welsh footballer (born 1934)
- September 25 - John Bond, English footballer (born 1932)
- September 26 - Pape Alioune Diop, Senegalese footballer
- September 28 - Juan Baena, Spanish footballer (born 1950)

=== October ===
- October 1 - Abdelkader Fréha, Algerian international footballer (born 1942)
- October 3 - Jean-Louis Lagadec, French footballer (born 1933)
- October 3 - Albie Roles, English footballer (born 1921)
- October 4 - Rudolf Oslansky, Austrian footballer (born 1931)
- October 7 - Georges Casolari, French footballer (born 1941)
- October 8 - Rafael Lesmes, Spanish footballer (born 1926)
- October 11 – Helmut Haller, German international footballer (born 1939).
- October 12 - Henry Moyo, Malawian footballer (born 1946)
- October 13 - Jim Rollo, Scottish footballer (born 1937)
- October 15 - Vladimir Čonč, Croatian footballer (born 1928)
- October 15 - Trevor Kemp, Scottish footballer
- October 15 - Alberto Reif, Italian footballer (born 1946)
- October 17 - Milija Aleksic, English footballer (born 1951)
- October 17 - Bandya Kakade, Indian footballer
- October 17 - Pépito Pavon, Serbian footballer (born 1941)
- October 19 - Raúl Valencia, Spanish footballer (born 1976)
- October 19 - Jaouad Akaddar, Moroccan footballer (born 1984)
- October 23 - Philippe Di Santo, Belgian footballer (born 1950)
- October 23 - Hughie Hay, Scottish footballer
- October 23 - Jozef Mannaerts, Belgian footballer (born 1923)
- October 24 - Peter Wright, English footballer (born 1934)
- October 25 - John Connely, English footballer (born 1938)
- October 30 - Georges Van Straelen, French footballer (born 1956)

=== November ===
- November 1 - Jan Louwers, Dutch footballer (82)
- November 4 - Reg Pickett, English footballer (85)
- November 5 - Keih Ripley, English footballer (77)
- November 5 - Jimmy Stephen, Scottish footballer (90)
- November 6 - Ivor Powell, Welsh footballer (96)
- November 6 - Bohdan Tsap, Ukrainian footballer (71)
- November 7 - Heinz-Jürgen Blome, German footballer (65)
- November 8 - Bobby Gilfillan, Scottish footballer (74)
- November 10 - Eric Day, English footballer (91)
- November 12 - Arthur Bialas, German footballer (81)
- November 12 - Harry McShane, Scottish footballer (92)
- November 14 - Alexandro Alves do Nascimento, Brazilian footballer (37)
- November 14 - Paddy Meegan, Irish Gaelic footballer (90)
- November 15 - Théophile Abega, Cameroonian footballer (58)
- November 17 - Henryk Grzybowski, Polish footballer (78)
- November 18 - Kenny Morgans, Welsh footballer (73)
- November 20 – Mike Ryan, Irish-born American coach, first head coach of the United States women's national team. (77)
- November 20 - Gary Ingham, English footballer (48)
- November 21 - Wang Houjun, Chinese footballer (69)
- November 22 - Mario Murillo, Costa Rican footballer (85)
- November 22 - Raimund Krauth, German footballer (59)
- November 23 - Alfonso Montemayor, Mexican football defender (90)
- November 23 - Goffredo Stabellini, Italian footballer (87)
- November 25 - Bert Linnecor, English footballer (78)
- November 25 - Dave Sexton, English football manager (82)
- November 27 - Herbert Oberhofer, Austrian footballer (57)
- November 27 - Pascal Kalemba, Congolese footballer (33)
- November 27 - Lennart Samuelsson, Swedish footballer (88)
- November 28 - Cosimo Nocera, Italian footballer (74)
- November 28 – José Maria Fidélis dos Santos, Brazilian defender, squad member of Brazil at the 1966 FIFA World Cup. (68)
- November 30 - Mario Ardizzon, Italian footballer (74)

=== December ===
- December 1: Mitchell Cole, English footballer (born 1985).
- December 1: Steve Fox, English footballer (born 1958).
- December 1: Phil Taylor, English footballer (born 1917).
- December 2: Azumir Veríssimo, Brazilian footballer (born 1935).
- December 3: Tommy Berggren, Swedish footballer (born 1950).
- December 3: Diego Mendieta, Paraguayan footballer (born 1980).
- December 4: Miguel Calero, Colombian goalkeeper (born 1971).
- December 5: Doug Smith, Scottish footballer (born 1937).
- December 7: Denis Houf, Belgian footballer (born 1932).
- December 13: Ian Black, Scottish footballer (born 1924).
- December 13: T. Shanmugham, Indian footballer (born 1920).
- December 16: Adam Ndlovu, Zimbabwean footballer (born 1970).
- December 16: Jim Patterson, Scottish footballer.
- December 17: Charlie Adam, Scottish footballer (born 1962).
- December 18: George Showell, English footballer (born 1934).
- December 20: Stan Charlton, English footballer (born 1929).
- December 20: Dennis Stevens, English footballer (born 1933).
- December 21: George Hazlett, Scottish footballer (born 1923)
- December 22: Wattie Dick, Scottish footballer (born 1927).
- December 23: Cristian Tudor, Romanian footballer (born 1982).
- December 27: Ken Jones, English footballer (born 1944).
- December 28: Václav Drobný, Czech footballer (born 1980).
- December 29: Salvador Reyes, Mexican forward (born 1936).
