= 2012–13 in Scottish football =

Football in Scotland
- Season: 2012–13

2012–13 in Scottish football

Premier League champions
- Celtic

First Division champions
- Partick Thistle

Second Division champions
- Queen of the South

Third Division champions
- Rangers

Scottish Cup winners
- Celtic

League Cup winners
- St Mirren

Challenge Cup winners
- Queen of the South

Youth Cup winners
- Celtic

Teams in Europe
- Celtic, Dundee United, Heart of Midlothian, Motherwell, St Johnstone

Scotland national team
- World Cup 2014 qualifying

The 2012–13 season was the 116th season of competitive football in Scotland. The season began on 28 July 2012, with the start of the Challenge Cup.

== League competitions ==
=== Scottish Premier League ===
Rangers' participation in the SPL was dependent upon the successful transfer of their membership share of the League to the new company that had bought the club, which would be decided by a vote of the SPL clubs. Eight clubs publicly declared that they would oppose the membership transfer, which would mean that they could not play in the SPL. The vote took place on 4 July 2012, and Rangers were refused re-entry to the SPL by a 10–1 majority. Dundee, who had finished second in the 2011–12 Scottish First Division, were invited to replace Rangers.

Pos	Team	Pld	W	D	L	GF	GA	GD	Pts	Qualification or relegation
1	Celtic (C)	38	24	7	7	92	35	+57	79	Qualification for the Champions League second qualifying round
2	Motherwell	38	18	9	11	67	51	+16	63	Qualification for the Europa League third qualifying round
3	St Johnstone	38	14	14	10	45	44	+1	56	Qualification for the Europa League second qualifying round
4	Inverness Caledonian Thistle	38	13	15	10	64	60	+4	54	
5	Ross County	38	13	14	11	47	48	−1	53	
6	Dundee United	38	11	14	13	51	62	−11	47 (Note: Teams in the bottom half at the time of the split may not overtake a team in the top 6 at the time of the split.)	
7	Hibernian	38	13	12	13	49	52	−3	51	Qualification for the Europa League second qualifying round (Note: Since the winners of 2012–13 Scottish Cup, Celtic, qualified for European competition based on league position, the runners–up Hibernian secured a spot in Europa League second qualifying round.)
8	Aberdeen	38	11	15	12	41	43	−2	48	
9	Kilmarnock	38	11	12	15	52	53	−1	45	
10	Heart of Midlothian	38	11	11	16	40	49	−9	44	
11	St Mirren	38	9	14	15	47	60	−13	41	
12	Dundee (R)	38	7	9	22	28	66	−38	30	Relegation to the Championship

Source: SPFL Archive
Rules for classification: 1) points; 2) goal difference; 3) number of goals scored.
(C) Champions; (R) Relegated

=== Scottish First Division ===
Pos	Team	Pld	W	D	L	GF	GA	GD	Pts	Promotion or relegation
1	Partick Thistle (C, P)	36	23	9	4	76	28	+48	78	Promotion to the Premiership
2	Greenock Morton	36	20	7	9	73	47	+26	67	
3	Falkirk	36	15	8	13	52	48	+4	53	
4	Livingston	36	14	10	12	58	56	+2	52	
5	Hamilton Academical	36	14	9	13	52	45	+7	51	
6	Raith Rovers	36	11	13	12	45	48	−3	46	
7	Dumbarton	36	13	4	19	58	83	−25	43	
8	Cowdenbeath	36	8	12	16	51	65	−14	36	
9	Dunfermline Athletic (R)	36	14	7	15	62	59	+3	34 (Note: Dunfermline Athletic were deducted 15 points for entering administration.)	Qualification for the First Division Play-offs
10	Airdrie United (R)	36	5	7	24	41	89	−48	22	Relegation to League One

Source: SPFL Archive
Rules for classification: 1) points; 2) goal difference; 3) number of goals scored.
(C) Champions; (P) Promoted; (R) Relegated

=== Scottish Second Division ===
Pos	Team	Pld	W	D	L	GF	GA	GD	Pts	Promotion, qualification or relegation
1	Queen of the South (C, P)	36	29	5	2	92	23	+69	92	Promotion to the Championship
2	Alloa Athletic (O, P)	36	20	7	9	62	35	+27	67	Qualification for the First Division play-offs
3	Brechin City	36	19	4	13	72	59	+13	61	Qualification for the First Division play-offs
4	Forfar Athletic	36	17	3	16	67	74	−7	54	Qualification for the First Division play-offs
5	Arbroath	36	15	7	14	47	57	−10	52	
6	Stenhousemuir	36	12	13	11	59	59	0	49	
7	Ayr United	36	12	5	19	53	65	−12	41	
8	Stranraer	36	10	7	19	43	71	−28	37	
9	East Fife (O)	36	8	8	20	50	65	−15	32	Qualification for the Second Division play-offs
10	Albion Rovers (R)	36	7	3	26	45	82	−37	24	Relegation to the League Two

Source: SPFL Archive
Rules for classification: 1) points; 2) goal difference; 3) number of goals scored.
(C) Champions; (O) Play-off winners; (P) Promoted; (R) Relegated

=== Scottish Third Division ===
Pos	Team	Pld	W	D	L	GF	GA	GD	Pts	Promotion or qualification
1	Rangers (C, P)	36	25	8	3	87	29	+58	83	Promotion to League One
2	Peterhead	36	17	8	11	52	28	+24	59	Qualification for the Second Division Play-offs
3	Queen's Park	36	16	8	12	60	54	+6	56	Qualification for the Second Division Play-offs
4	Berwick Rangers	36	14	7	15	59	55	+4	49	Qualification for the Second Division Play-offs
5	Elgin City	36	13	10	13	67	69	−2	49	
6	Montrose	36	12	11	13	60	68	−8	47	
7	Stirling Albion	36	12	9	15	59	58	+1	45	
8	Annan Athletic	36	11	10	15	54	65	−11	43	
9	Clyde	36	12	4	20	42	66	−24	40	
10	East Stirlingshire	36	8	5	23	49	97	−48	29	

Source: SPFL archive
Rules for classification: 1) points; 2) goal difference; 3) number of goals scored.
(C) Champions; (P) Promoted

=== Scottish Premier Under-20 League ===
Pos	Team	Pld	W	D	L	GF	GA	GD	Pts
1	Celtic (C)	28	20	4	4	55	21	+34	64
2	Aberdeen	28	17	6	5	77	34	+43	57
3	Hibernian	28	14	6	8	57	36	+21	48
4	St Mirren	28	14	5	9	53	49	+4	47
5	Dundee United	28	14	3	11	54	41	+13	45
6	Inverness Caledonian Thistle	28	13	5	10	50	47	+3	44
7	St Johnstone	28	13	2	13	41	50	−9	41
8	Hamilton Academical	28	10	8	10	42	47	−5	38
9	Heart of Midlothian	28	10	7	11	46	49	−3	37
10	Dunfermline Athletic	28	11	3	14	44	52	−8	36
11	Kilmarnock	28	11	1	16	47	65	−18	34
12	Falkirk	28	9	5	14	29	32	−3	32
13	Motherwell	28	9	4	15	48	56	−8	31
14	Ross County	28	6	5	17	29	52	−23	23
15	Dundee	28	5	4	19	31	72	−41	19

Updated to match(es) played on unknown. Source: Scottish Premier League
Rules for classification: 1) points; 2) goal difference; 3) number of goals scored.
(C) Champions

== Honours ==
=== Cup honours ===
Competition	Winner	Score	Runner-up	Match report
2012–13 Scottish Cup	Celtic	3 – 0	Hibernian	Report
2012–13 League Cup	St Mirren	3 – 2	Heart of Midlothian	Report
2012–13 Challenge Cup	Queen of the South	1 – 1 (a.e.t.); 6 – 5 pens.	Partick Thistle	Report
2012–13 Youth Cup	Celtic	3 – 1	Dunfermline Athletic	Report
2012–13 Junior Cup	Auchinleck Talbot	1 – 0	Linlithgow Rose	Report

=== Non-league honours ===
==== Senior ====
Competition	Winner
2012–13 Highland League	Cove Rangers
2012–13 East of Scotland League	Whitehill Welfare
South of Scotland League	Dalbeattie Star

==== Junior ====
West Region

Division	Winner
2012-13 Super League Premier Division	Auchinleck Talbot
Super League First Division	Hurlford United
Ayrshire League	Kilwinning Rangers
Central League Division One	Greenock Juniors
Central League Division Two	Cambuslang Rangers

East Region

Division	Winner
2012-13 Superleague	Linlithgow Rose
Premier League	Newtongrange Star
North Division	Kirriemuir Thistle
Central Division	Kinnoull
South Division	Fauldhouse United

North Region

Division	Winner
2012-13 Superleague	Culter
Division One	New Elgin
Division Two	Colony Park

=== Individual honours ===
==== PFA Scotland awards ====
The PFA Scotland awards took place in Glasgow on 5 May 2013, with the following winners:

Award	Winner	Team
Players' Player of the Year	(England) Michael Higdon	Motherwell
Young Player of the Year	(Scotland) Leigh Griffiths	Hibernian on loan from Wolves
Manager of the Year	(Scotland) Allan Johnston	Queen of the South
First Division Player	(England) Lyle Taylor	Falkirk
Second Division Player	(Scotland) Nicky Clark	Queen of the South
Third Division Player	(Scotland) Lee Wallace	Rangers

==== SFWA awards ====
Award	Winner	Team
Footballer of the Year	(Scotland) Leigh Griffiths	Hibernian on loan from Wolves
Young Player of the Year	(Scotland) Stuart Armstrong	Dundee United
Manager of the Year	(Northern Ireland) Neil Lennon	Celtic
International Player of the Year	(Scotland) Jordan Rhodes	Blackburn Rovers

== Scottish clubs in Europe ==
=== Summary ===
Club	Competitions	Started round	Final round	Coef.	Top Scorer
Celtic	UEFA Champions League	Third qualifying round	Round of 16	16.0	(Greece) Giorgos Samaras, 5
Motherwell	UEFA Champions League	Third qualifying round	Third qualifying round	1.5	
Motherwell	UEFA Europa League	Play-off round	Play-off round	1.5	
Heart of Midlothian	UEFA Europa League	Play-off round	Play-off round	1.5	(Scotland) David Templeton, 1
Dundee United	UEFA Europa League	Third qualifying round	Third qualifying round	1.0	(Republic of Ireland) Willo Flood, 1 (Scotland) Keith Watson, 1
St Johnstone	UEFA Europa League	Second qualifying round	Second qualifying round	0.5	(France) Grégory Tadé, 1
Total				20.5	
Average				4.3	

=== Celtic ===
2012–13 UEFA Champions League

1 August 2012 Third qualifying round	Celtic (Scotland)	2 – 1	(Finland) HJK	Glasgow
19:45	Hooper 54'; Mulgrew 61'	BBC Sport	47' Schüller	Stadium: Celtic Park; Attendance: 52,849; Referee: Miroslav Zelinka (Czech Republic)

8 August 2012 Third qualifying round	HJK (Finland)	0 – 2 (1 – 4 agg.)	(Scotland) Celtic	Helsinki
18:00		BBC Sport	67' Ledley; 76' Samaras	Stadium: Sonera Stadium; Attendance: 10,269; Referee: Robert Schörgenhofer (Austria)

21 August 2012 Play-off round	Helsingborg (Sweden)	0 – 2	(Scotland) Celtic	Helsingborg
19:45		BBC Sport	2' Commons; 75' Samaras	Stadium: Olympia; Attendance: 12,200; Referee: Olegário Benquerença (Portugal)

29 August 2012 Play-off round	Celtic (Scotland)	2 – 0 (4 – 0 agg.)	(Sweden) Helsingborg	Glasgow
19:45	Hooper 30'; Wanyama 88'	BBC Sport		Stadium: Celtic Park; Attendance: 51,566; Referee: Carlos Velasco Carballo (Spain)

19 September 2012 Group G	Celtic (Scotland)	0 – 0	(Portugal) Benfica	Glasgow
19:45		BBC Sport		Stadium: Celtic Park; Attendance: 57,759; Referee: Nicola Rizzoli (Italy)

2 October 2012 Group G	Spartak Moscow (Russia)	2 – 3	(Scotland) Celtic	Moscow
17:00	Emenike 41', 48'; Insaurralde (red card) 63'	BBC Sport	12' Hooper; 71' (o.g.) Kombarov; 90' Samaras	Stadium: Luzhniki Stadium; Attendance: 31,000; Referee: Tony Chapron (France)

23 October 2012 Group G	Barcelona (Spain)	2 – 1	(Scotland) Celtic	Barcelona
19:45	Iniesta 45'; Alba 90+4'	BBC Sport	18' Samaras	Stadium: Camp Nou; Attendance: 77,781; Referee: Gianluca Rocchi (Italy)

7 November 2012 Group G	Celtic (Scotland)	2 – 1	(Spain) Barcelona	Glasgow
19:45	Wanyama 21'; Watt 83'	BBC Sport	90+1' Messi	Stadium: Celtic Park; Attendance: 55,283; Referee: Björn Kuipers (Netherlands)

20 November 2012 Group G	Benfica (Portugal)	2 – 1	(Scotland) Celtic	Lisbon
19:45	John 7'; Garay 71'	BBC Sport	32' Samaras	Stadium: Estádio da Luz; Attendance: 47,065; Referee: Viktor Kassai (Hungary)

5 December 2012 Group G	Celtic (Scotland)	2 – 1	(Russia) Spartak Moscow	Glasgow
19:45	Hooper 21'; Commons 81' (pen.)	BBC Sport	39' Ari	Stadium: Celtic Park; Attendance: 59,168; Referee: Felix Brych (Germany)

12 February 2013 Round of 16	Celtic (Scotland)	0 – 3	(Italy) Juventus	Glasgow
19:45		BBC Sport	Matri 3'; Marchisio 77'; Vučinić 83'	Stadium: Celtic Park; Attendance: 57,917; Referee: Alberto Undiano Mallenco (Italy)

6 March 2013 Round of 16	Juventus (Italy)	2 – 0 (5 – 0 agg.)	(Scotland) Celtic	Turin
19:45	Matri 24'; Quagliarella 65'	BBC Sport		Stadium: Juventus Stadium; Attendance: 39,011; Referee: Fırat Aydınus (Turkey)

=== Motherwell ===
2012–13 UEFA Champions League

31 July 2012 Third qualifying round	Motherwell (Scotland)	0 – 2	(Greece) Panathinaikos	Motherwell
19:45		BBC Sport	13' Christodoulopoulos; 76' Mavrias	Stadium: Fir Park; Attendance: 9,035; Referee: Pol van Boekel (Netherlands)

8 August 2012 Third qualifying round	Panathinaikos (Greece)	3 – 0 (5 – 0 agg.)	(Scotland) Motherwell	Athens
19:45	Christodoulopoulos 51'; Mavrias 75'; Sissoko 83'	BBC Sport		Stadium: Olympic Stadium; Attendance: 27,000; Referee: Stephan Studer (Switzerland)

2012–13 UEFA Europa League

23 August 2012 Play-off round	Motherwell (Scotland)	0 – 2	(Spain) Levante	Motherwell
19:45		BBC Sport	42' Juanlu; 62' El Zhar	Stadium: Fir Park; Attendance: 6,286; Referee: Antti Munukka (Finland)

30 August 2012 Play-off round	Levante (Spain)	1 – 0 (3 – 0 agg.)	(Scotland) Motherwell	Valencia
19:45	Gekas 72'	BBC Sport		Stadium: Estadi Ciutat de València; Attendance: 13,398; Referee: Clément Turpin (France)

=== Heart of Midlothian ===
2012–13 UEFA Europa League

23 August 2012 Play-off round	Heart of Midlothian (Scotland)	0 – 1	(England) Liverpool	Edinburgh
19:45		BBC Sport	78' (o.g.) Webster	Stadium: Tynecastle Stadium; Attendance: 15,965; Referee: Florian Meyer (Germany)

30 August 2012 Play-off round	Liverpool (England)	1 – 1 (2 – 1 agg.)	(Scotland) Heart of Midlothian	Liverpool
20:05	Suárez 88'	BBC Report	85' Templeton	Stadium: Anfield; Attendance: 44,361; Referee: Vladislav Bezborodov (Russia)

=== Dundee United ===
2012–13 UEFA Europa League

2 August 2012 Third qualifying round	Dundee United (Scotland)	2 – 2	(Russia) Dynamo Moscow	Dundee
19:45	Flood 37'; Watson 76'	BBC Report	50' Semshov; 90+3' Kokorin	Stadium: Tannadice Park; Attendance: 9,977; Referee: Marius Avram (Romania)

9 August 2012 Third qualifying round	Dynamo Moscow (Russia)	5 – 0 (7 – 2 agg.)	(Scotland) Dundee United	Khimki
17:00	Semshov 3'; Kokorin 23'; Yusupov 40'; Sapeta 83', 88'	BBC Report		Stadium: Arena Khimki; Attendance: 9,063; Referee: Stefan Johannesson (Sweden)

=== St Johnstone ===
2012–13 UEFA Europa League

19 July 2012 Second qualifying round	Eskişehirspor (Turkey)	2 – 0	(Scotland) St Johnstone	Eskişehir
18:00	Potuk 41'; Sarı 64'	BBC Sport		Stadium: Atatürk Stadium; Attendance: 12,206; Referee: Ante Vucemilovic (Croatia)

26 July 2012 Second qualifying round	St Johnstone (Scotland)	1 – 1 (1 – 3 agg.)	(Turkey) Eskişehirspor	Perth
19:45	Tadé 35'	BBC Sport	51' Sarı	Stadium: McDiarmid Park; Attendance: 6,023; Referee: Serge Gumienny (Belgium)

== Scotland national team ==
15 August 2012 Challenge match	Scotland	3 – 1	Australia	Edinburgh
20:00 GMT	Rhodes 29'; Davidson 62' (o.g.); McCormack 75'	BBC Sport	17' Bresciano	Stadium: Easter Road; Attendance: 11,110; Referee: Tom Harald Hagen (Norway)

8 September 2012 WCQ Group A	Scotland	0 – 0	Serbia	Glasgow
15:00		BBC Sport		Stadium: Hampden Park; Attendance: 47,369; Referee: Jonas Eriksson (Sweden)

11 September 2012 WCQ Group A	Scotland	1 – 1	North Macedonia	Glasgow
20:00	Miller 43'	BBC Sport	11' Noveski	Stadium: Hampden Park; Attendance: 32,430; Referee: Sergei Karasev (Russia)

12 October 2012 WCQ Group A	Wales	2 – 1	Scotland	Cardiff
19:45	Bale 81' (pen.), 89'	BBC Sport	27' Morrison	Stadium: Cardiff City Stadium; Attendance: 23,249; Referee: Florian Meyer (Germany)

16 October 2012 WCQ Group A	Belgium	2 – 0	Scotland	Brussels
20:45	Benteke 69'; Kompany 71'	BBC Sport		Stadium: King Baudouin Stadium; Attendance: 44,047; Referee: Tom Harald Hagen (Norway)

14 November 2012 Friendly	Luxembourg	1 – 2	Scotland	Luxembourg
19:00 GMT	Gerson 47'	BBC Sport	11', 24' Rhodes	Stadium: Stade Josy Barthel; Attendance: 2,521; Referee: Cyril Zimmermann, (Switzerland)

6 February 2013 Challenge match	Scotland	1 – 0	Estonia	Aberdeen
19:45	Mulgrew 39'	BBC Sport		Stadium: Pittodrie Stadium; Attendance: 16,102; Referee: Clément Turpin (France)

22 March 2013 WCQ Group A	Scotland	1 – 2	Wales	Glasgow
20:00	Hanley 45+2'	BBC Sport	72' (pen.) Ramsey; 74' Robson-Kanu	Stadium: Hampden Park; Attendance: 39,365; Referee: Antony Gautier (France)

26 March 2013 WCQ Group A	Serbia	2 – 0	Scotland	Novi Sad
19:30	Đuričić 60', 65'	Summary		Stadium: Karađorđe Stadium; Attendance: 10,000; Referee: István Vad (Hungary)

7 June 2013 WCQ Group A	Croatia	0 – 1	Scotland	Zagreb
			Snodgrass 26'	Stadium: Stadion Maksimir; Referee: David Fernández Borbalán (Spain)

== Women's football ==
=== League and Cup honours ===
Division	Winner
2012 Scottish Women's Premier League	Glasgow City
SWFL First Division	Hibernian Reserves
SWFL Second Division North	Stonehaven
SWFL Second Division West	Murieston United
SWFL Second Division East	Dunfermline Athletic
SWFL Second Division South East	Hearts

Competition	Winner	Score	Runner-up	Match report
2012 Scottish Women's Cup	Glasgow City	1 – 0	Forfar Farmington	BBC Sport
2012 Scottish Women's Premier League Cup	Glasgow City	5 – 1	Spartans	BBC Sport
SWFL First Division Cup	Queen's Park	0 – 0 (3 – 2 pens)	Paisley Saints	SWFitba
SWFL Second Division Cup	Hearts	6 – 1	Aberdeen Reserves	Hearts FC

=== Individual honours ===
==== SWF awards ====
The SWF awards evening took place at Hampden Park, Glasgow on 23 November 2012 and the winners were as follows:

Award	Winner	Team
Players' Player of the Year	Jane Ross	Glasgow City
International Player of the Year	Rhonda Jones	Celtic
Manager of the Year	Mark Nisbet	Forfar Farmington
Premier Division Player of the Year	Natalie Ross	Celtic
First Division Player	Lesley Blair	Airdrie Ladies
Second Division Player	Laura-Anne Johnston	Dundee City

=== Scottish Women's Premier League ===
Pos	Team	Pld	W	D	L	GF	GA	GD	Pts	Qualification or relegation
1	Glasgow City (C, Q)	21	20	0	1	143	10	+133	60	2013–14 Champions League
2	Forfar Farmington	21	14	2	5	50	23	+27	44	
3	Celtic	21	14	1	6	72	19	+53	43	
4	Hibernian	21	14	1	6	80	31	+49	43	
5	Spartans	21	8	2	11	42	49	−7	26	
6	Aberdeen	21	5	1	15	18	94	−76	16	
7	Hamilton Academical	21	10	6	5	74	42	+32	36	
8	Hutchison Vale	21	9	3	9	61	65	−4	30	
9	Rangers	21	7	3	11	37	41	−4	24	
10	Falkirk	21	7	2	12	36	71	−35	23	
11	Inverness City (R)	21	4	3	14	38	87	−49	15	Relegation to SWFL First Division
12	FC Kilmarnock Ladies (R)	21	1	2	18	23	142	−119	5	Relegation to SWFL First Division

Source: Scottish Women's FA
Rules for classification: 1) Points; 2) Goal difference; 3) Number of goals scored
(C) Champions; (Q) Qualified for the phase indicated; (R) Relegated

=== Scotland women's national team ===
15 July 2012 Challenge match	Cameroon	0 – 2	Scotland	Aberdeen
15:00		Scottish FA	35' (o.g.) Ariane Bebey Beyene; 88' Joanne Love	Stadium: Chris Anderson Stadium

4 August 2012 Challenge match	Scotland	1 – 1	Iceland	Greenock
15:00	Emma Mitchell 89'	Scottish FA	82' Sandra Maria Jessen	Stadium: Cappielow Park; Attendance: 412; Referee: Morag Pirie (Scotland)

30 August 2012 Challenge match	Scotland	2 – 2	Norway	Dunfermline
14:00	Emma Mitchell 13'; Sarah Crilly 85'	Scottish FA	70', 75' Isabell Herlovsen	Stadium: East End Park; Attendance: Closed door match

15 Sep 2012 Qualifying group 4	Wales	1 – 2	Scotland	Llanelli
18:00	Helen Lander 38'	UEFA	45' Joanne Love; 68' Kim Little	Stadium: Parc y Scarlets; Referee: Jenny Palmqvist (Sweden)

19 Sep 2012 Qualifying group 4	Scotland	0 – 5	France	Edinburgh
17:00		Scottish FA	17', 72' Marie-Laure Delie; 34', 66' Eugénie Le Sommer; 64' Louisa Nécib	Stadium: Tynecastle Stadium; Attendance: 731; Referee: Silvia Tea Spinelli (Italy)

20 Oct 2012 Play-off	Scotland	1 – 1	Spain	Glasgow
14:00	Kim Little 26' (pen.)	BBC Sport	30' Adriana Martín	Stadium: Hampden Park; Attendance: 4,058; Referee: Esther Staubli (Switzerland)

24 Oct 2012 Play-off	Spain	3 – 2 (a.e.t.) (4 – 3 agg.)	Scotland	Las Rozas
18:00	Adriana Martín 74'; Silvia Meseguer 113'; Verónica Boquete 120+2'	Report	62' Emma Mitchell; 98' Kim Little	Stadium: La Ciudad del Fútbol; Referee: Bibiana Steinhaus (Germany)

9 Feb 2013 Challenge match	United States	4 – 1	Scotland	Jacksonville
22:00 (GMT)	Christen Press 13', 32'; Shannon Boxx 53'; Sydney Leroux 88'	US Soccer	54' Kim Little	Stadium: EverBank Field; Attendance: 18,565; Referee: Margaret Domka (United States)

14 Feb 2013 Challenge match	United States	3 – 1	Scotland	Nashville
01:00 (GMT)	Megan Rapinoe 21'; Abby Wambach 51'; Christen Press 63'	US Soccer	81' Suzanne Grant	Stadium: LP Field; Attendance: 14,224

6 Mar 2013 Cyprus Cup Group A	New Zealand	1 – 0	Scotland	Nicosia
14:30	Betsy Hassett 26'	Scottish FA		Stadium: GSP Stadium

8 Mar 2013 Cyprus Cup Group A	Scotland	4 – 4	England	Larnaca
17:30	Lisa Evans 18'; Jane Ross 48'; Kim Little 53'; Emma Mitchell 82'	Scottish FA	40' Ellen White; 45+1' Toni Duggan; 73' Rachel Williams; 77' Kelly Smith	Stadium: GSZ Stadium

11 Mar 2013 Cyprus Cup Group A	Italy	1 – 2	Scotland	Larnaca
14:30	Sara Gama 73'	Scottish FA	17' Jane Ross; 63' Rhonda Jones	Stadium: GSZ Stadium

13 Mar 2013 5th/6th place play-off	Netherlands	0 – 1	Scotland	Nicosia
14:00		Scottish FA	29' Kim Little	Stadium: GSP Stadium

7 Apr 2013 Challenge match	Scotland	2 – 1	Wales	Dunfermline
13:00	Jane Ross 5'; Emma Mitchell 68'	Scottish FA	12' Natasha Harding	Stadium: East End Park; Attendance: 596; Referee: Lorraine Clark (Scotland)

1 Jun 2013 Challenge match	Iceland	2 – 3	Scotland	Reykjavík
18:45 (BST)	Sara Björk Gunnarsdóttir 26'; Hólmfríður Magnúsdóttir 52'	Scottish FA	11' Leanne Crichton; 13' Emily Thomson; 33' Leanne Ross	Stadium: Laugardalsvöllur

15 Jun 2013 Challenge match	Germany	–	Scotland	Essen
14:30 (BST)				Stadium: Stadion Essen

=== Glasgow City ===
2012–13 UEFA Women's Champions League

11 Aug 2012 Qualifying round	Glasgow City (Scotland)	3 – 2	(Croatia) ŽNK Osijek	Vantaa
17:00 (CET)	Danica Dalziel 67', 79'; Emma Mitchell 86'	UEFA	9' Izabela Lojna; 74' Ana Marija Kalamiza	Stadium: Myyrmäki Urheilupuisto; Referee: Carina Vitulano (Italy)

13 Aug 2012 Qualifying round	Glasgow City (Scotland)	11 – 0	(Moldova) FC Noroc	Vantaa
17:30 (CET)	Leanne Ross 4', 17'; Jennifer Callaghan 8', 45+1'; Eilish McSorley 10', 21'; Danica Dalziel 40'; Katharina Lindner 50', 54', 89'; Ashley McDonald 80'	UEFA		Stadium: Hakunilan Urheilupuisto; Referee: Simona Ghisletta (Switzerland)

16 Aug 2012 Qualifying round	PK-35 Vantaa (Finland)	1 – 1	(Scotland) Glasgow City	Vantaa
17:00 (CET)	Cynthia Uwak 8'	UEFA	5' Jane Ross	Stadium: Myyrmäki Urheilupuisto; Referee: Carina Vitulano (Italy)

26 Sep 2012 Round of 32	Glasgow City (Scotland)	1 – 2	(Denmark) Fortuna Hjørring	Glasgow
19:00	Jane Ross 76'	UEFA	3', 31' Nadia Nadim	Stadium: Petershill Park; Attendance: 460; Referee: Knarik Grigoryan (Armenia)

3 Oct 2012 Round of 32	Fortuna Hjørring (Denmark)	0 – 0 (2 – 1 agg.)	(Scotland) Glasgow City	Hjørring
20:15		BBC Sport		Stadium: Hjørring Stadium; Attendance: 817; Referee: Stéphanie Frappart (France)

== Deaths ==
- 11 July: Joe McBride, 74, Kilmarnock, Motherwell, Celtic, Hibs, Partick Thistle, Dunfermline, Clyde and Scotland forward.
- 11 July: Bobby Nicol, 76, Hibernian and Berwick Rangers wing half.
- 4 August: Jimmy Thomson, 75, St Mirren, Dunfermline and Raith Rovers defender; Dunfermline, Alloa, Berwick Rangers and Raith Rovers manager.
- 12 August: Jackie Watters, 92, Celtic and Airdrieonians forward
- 25 August: Emilio Pacione, 92, Dundee United winger.
- 12 September: Jimmy Andrews, 85, Dundee winger.
- 15 October: Jim Rollo, 74, Hibs goalkeeper.
- 15 October: Trevor Kemp, Berwick Rangers forward.
- 19 October: Iain Jamieson, 84, Aberdeen wing half.
- 23 October: Hughie Hay, 80, Aberdeen, Dundee United and Arbroath forward.
- 5 November: Jimmy Stephen, 90, Portsmouth defender, won two caps for Scotland.
- 7 November: Harry McShane, 92, Blackburn Rovers and Manchester United winger.
- 8 November: Bobby Gilfillan, 74, Cowdenbeath, St Johnstone and Raith Rovers forward.
- 5 December: Doug Smith, 75, Dundee United defender and director; Scottish Football League president.
- 13 December: Ian Black, 88, Aberdeen, Southampton, Fulham and Scotland goalkeeper.
- 16 December: Jim Patterson, 84, Queen of the South forward, all-time top goalscorer for club.
- 17 December: Charlie Adam, 50, Arbroath, Brechin City, Dundee United, Forfar Athletic, Partick Thistle and St Johnstone midfielder.
- 22 December: Wattie Dick, 85, Third Lanark inside forward.
- 22 December: George Hazlett, 89, Celtic winger.
- 23 December: Doug Stockdale, 86, Raith Rovers, Ayr United and Forfar Athletic forward.
- 29 December: Hugh Adam, 87, Rangers director.
- 31 December: Willie Benvie, Dunfermline Athletic and Raith Rovers forward.
- 3 January: George Falconer, 66, Raith Rovers, Dundee and Montrose forward.
- 18 January: Peter Boyle, 61, Clyde forward, made one appearance for Australia.
- 18 January: Sean Fallon, 90, Celtic defender and assistant manager.
- 8 February: Ian Lister, 65, Aberdeen, Dunfermline Athletic, Raith Rovers, St Mirren and Berwick Rangers winger.
- 19 February: John Downie, 87, Manchester United inside forward.
- 2 March: Jimmy Jackson, 81, Notts County forward.
- 7 March: Willie McCulloch, 85, Kilmarnock, Airdrie, St Mirren and Morton winger.
- 14 March: Harry Thomson, 72, Burnley and Blackpool goalkeeper.
- 21 March: Angus Carmichael, 87, Queen's Park defender; played for Great Britain in the 1948 Olympic Games.
- 5 April: Tommy McGhee, 66, Clydebank forward.
- 21 April: Jimmy McGill, 87, Queen of the South forward.
- 6 May: Ian MacLeod, 53, Motherwell, Falkirk, Raith Rovers and Meadowbank Thistle player.
- 8 May: Ernie Winchester, 68, Aberdeen, Hearts and Arbroath forward.
- 17 June: Peter Millar, 62, Arbroath, Dunfermline, Motherwell and Dundee midfielder.
