= Pacione =

Pacione is an Italian surname. Notable people with the surname include:

- Cristina Pacione-Zayas (born 1977/1978), American politician
- Emilio Pacione (1920–2012), Scottish footballer
- Marco Pacione (born 1963), Italian footballer
