= Thabang Lebese =

South African soccer player

Personal information
- Full name: Thabang Johnny Lebese
- Date of birth: 24 August 1973
- Place of birth: Soweto, South Africa
- Date of death: 22 February 2012 (aged 38)
- Place of death: Johannesburg, South Africa
- Position: Midfielder

Youth career
- Orlando Wanderers
- 1988–1993: Orlando Hotspurs
- Kaizer Chiefs

Senior career*
Years	Team	Apps	(Gls)
1993	Kaizer Chiefs B	2	(?)
1993–2000	Kaizer Chiefs	219	(75)
2000–2001	Ria Stars	28	(8)
2001–2003	Orlando Pirates	22	(4)
2003–2004	Silver Stars	8	(0)
2004	Moroka Swallows	6	(0)
2004–2005	Black Leopards	5	(0)
2005–2006	Dynamos	?	(?)
Total		288+	(87+)

International career
1994	South Africa U23	1	(0)
1998	South Africa	1	(0)
- * Club domestic league appearances and goals

Thabang Johnny Lebese (24 August 1973 – 22 February 2012) was a South African soccer player who played at both professional and international levels, as a midfielder.

== Club career ==
Lebese played youth football for Orlando Wanderers and Orlando Hotspurs, and professionally for Kaizer Chiefs, Ria Stars, Orlando Pirates, Silver Stars, Moroka Swallows, Black Leopards and Dynamos. In total, he made 279 appearances in the Premier Soccer League during his 13-year career.

== International career ==
Lebese earned one cap for South Africa in 1998, in a COSAFA Cup match against Namibia.

== Later life and death ==
Lebese died on 22 February 2012, at the age of 38, from an AIDS-related illness.
