= Dudley Peake =

Welsh footballer

Personal information
- Full name: Dudley John Peake
- Place of birth: Swansea, Wales
- Position: Centre half

Senior career*
Years	Team	Apps	(Gls)
1956–1957	Swansea Town	57	(2)
1958–1963	Newport County	129	(0)
- * Club domestic league appearances and goals

Dudley Peake (26 October 1934 – 28 April 2012) was a Welsh professional footballer. A centre half, he began his career with Swansea Town in 1956. Played for Swansea in the 1957 Welsh Cup Final and scored two goals in his time there.

In 1958 he was transferred to Newport County for £2000 and made 129 Football League appearances for the club without scoring.

In 1963 Peake moved to Romford but did not make an appearance for them. Later played for Merthyr Tydfil.

Whilst playing for Newport, Dudley studied O & A Levels and then went on to complete a degree at Swansea University.

Dudley became a lecturer in economics at Cardiff and Bangor Universities and retired early in 1987.

He died on 28 April 2012 and was survived by his wife Phyllis, three sons: John, David, and Philip and his three granddaughters: Kayla, Sioned, and Millie. His wife, Phyllis died on 5 January 2021.
