= Angus Carmichael =

Scottish footballer

Personal information
- Full name: Angus Macdonald Ewing Carmichael
- Date of birth: 12 June 1925
- Place of birth: Fort Rosebery, Northern Rhodesia
- Date of death: 21 March 2013 (aged 87)
- Place of death: Horncastle, England
- Height: 6 ft 2 in (1.88 m)
- Position: Left back

Senior career*
Years	Team	Apps	(Gls)
1947–1950	Queen's Park	42	(0)

International career
1948	Great Britain	1	(0)
- * Club domestic league appearances and goals

Angus Macdonald Ewing Carmichael (12 June 1925 – 21 March 2013) was a Scottish footballer who played as a left back.

== Early and personal life ==
Angus Macdonald Ewing Carmichael was born on 12 June 1925.

== Career ==
Carmichael represented Great Britain at the 1948 Summer Olympics, making one appearance in the tournament. Carmichael, described as a "tall, brawny left-back", was studying for a degree in veterinary medicine at the time, alongside his football career.

Carmichael played club football for Queen's Park, making 42 appearances in the Scottish Football League.

== Later life and death ==
After graduating from University, and with his football career over due to injury, Carmichael moved to Horncastle, Lincolnshire in order to become a vet. He died on 21 March 2013, at the age of 87.
