= Arthur Bialas =

German footballer

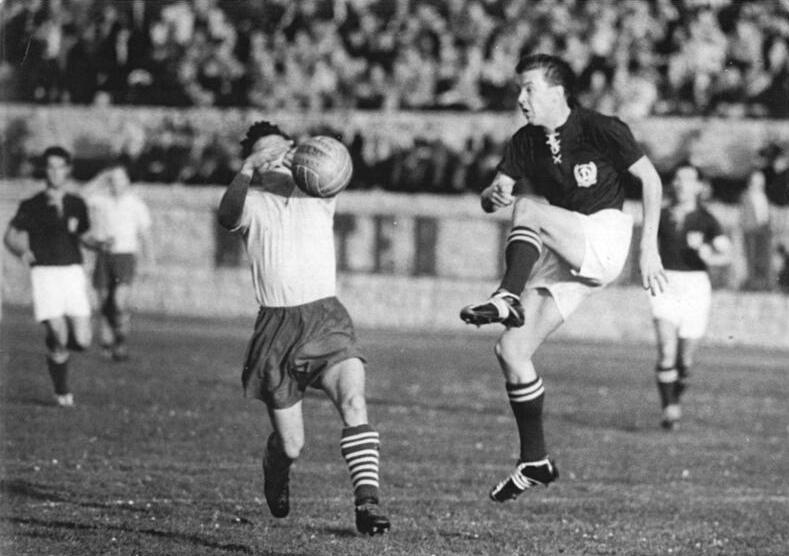
- Arthur Bialas (left, with the ball) in 1956

Personal information
- Date of birth: 21 November 1930
- Place of birth: Ratibor, Silesia, Germany
- Date of death: 12 November 2012 (aged 81)
- Position: Forward

Senior career*
Years	Team	Apps	(Gls)
–1953	Eintracht Seelow		
1953–1954	Motor Altenburg	24	(17)
1954–1962	Empor Rostock	148	(99)
1962–1967	Stahl Eisenhüttenstadt	83	(38)

International career
1961	East Germany	1	(0)

Managerial career
- –1968: Stahl Eisenhüttenstadt
- * Club domestic league appearances and goals

Arthur Bialas (21 November 1930 – 12 November 2012) was a German footballer.

He scored 79 goals in the East German top division for SC Empor Rostock.

Arthur Bialas won his only cap in a World Cup qualifier against Hungary in 1961.

His teammates at Rostock included elder brother Franz Bialas.

Children: Bärbel Bialas + Michael Bialas Grandchildren: Mandy, David, Jasmin, Julian
