= Brian Heward =

English footballer

Personal information
- Date of birth: 17 July 1935
- Place of birth: Lincoln, England
- Date of death: 21 April 2012 (aged 76)
- Place of death: South Hykeham, England
- Position: Centre half

Youth career
- –: Scunthorpe United

Senior career*
| Years | Team | Apps | (Gls) |
| 1954–1961 | Scunthorpe United | 137 | (0) |
| 1961–1966 | Lincoln City | 97 | (1) |
| Total | | 234 | (1) |
- * Club domestic league appearances and goals

Brian Heward (17 July 1935 – 21 April 2012) was an English professional footballer who made 234 appearances in the Football League playing for Scunthorpe United and Lincoln City. He played as a centre half.

== Life and career ==
Heward was born in Lincoln, Lincolnshire, and began his football career as a junior with Second Division club Scunthorpe United. He made his first-team debut in March 1954, and played more frequently after established centre-half Dick White joined Liverpool. He moved on to Lincoln City, newly relegated to the Third Division, for "a small fee" in the 1961 close season. Over the next six season, Heward made 114 appearances in all competitions, scoring twice.

After his retirement as a player, Heward became chairman of Lincoln City's fundraising body, the Red Imps Association. He was active in the Federation of Small Businesses, chairing the local branch for many years, and represented the Lincolnshire region on the federation's national governing body, becoming the longest serving national councillor.

Heward was married with a family. He died in South Hykeham, Lincolnshire, in April 2012 at the age of 76.
