= Ioan Drăgan =

Romanian footballer

Personal information
- Date of birth: 2 December 1965
- Place of birth: Brașov, Romania
- Date of death: 2 January 2012 (aged 46)
- Position: Central defender

Youth career
- –1981: CSȘ Brașovia
- 1981–1985: ICIM Brașov

Senior career*
Years	Team	Apps	(Gls)
1985–1990	ICIM Brașov		
1990–1997	FC Brașov	169	(1)
1997–2000	Tractorul Brașov		
Total		169	(1)
- * Club domestic league appearances and goals

Ioan Drăgan (2 December 1965 – 2 January 2012) was a Romanian footballer who played 169 matches for FC Brașov.

== Career ==
Born on 2 December 1965 in Brașov, Drăgan began playing football at Clubul Sportiv Școlar Brașovia, before moving to ICIM Brașov, where he played at both junior and senior level in Divizia B. On 12 August 1990, he made his debut in the Romanian top flight for FCM Brașov, in a 3–0 victory over Inter Sibiu.
