= Raúl Valencia =

Spanish footballer (1976–2012)

Personal information
- Full name: Raúl María Valencia Muñoz
- Date of birth: 20 March 1976
- Place of birth: Seville, Spain
- Date of death: 19 October 2012 (aged 36)
- Position: Central defender

Senior career*
Years	Team	Apps	(Gls)
- Xerez
–1997	Atlético Sanluqueño		
1997	San Fernando de Cádiz		
1997–1999	Mallorca B	6	(0)
2000–2002	Albacete	41	(0)
2002–2003	AD Ceuta	25	(0)
2003–2004	Girona	34	(0)
Total		106	(0)
- * Club domestic league appearances and goals

Raúl María Valencia Muñoz (20 March 1976 – 19 October 2012) was a Spanish professional footballer who played as a central defender.

== Career ==
Born in Seville, Valencia played for Xerez, Atlético Sanluqueño, San Fernando de Cádiz Mallorca B, Albacete, AD Ceuta and Girona.

== Later life and death ==
Valencia died on 19 October 2012 following a long illness.
