= Juan Baena =

Spanish footballer

Personal information
- Full name: Juan Baena Ruiz
- Date of birth: 18 May 1950
- Place of birth: Ceuta, Spain
- Date of death: 28 September 2012 (aged 62)
- Place of death: Alicante, Spain
- Height: 1.80 m (5 ft 11 in)
- Position: Centre back

Youth career
- Triana
- 19??–1969: Betis

Senior career*
Years	Team	Apps	(Gls)
1969–1971	Betis B	?	(?)
1971	→ Logroñés (loan)	3	(1)
1971–1972	→ Hércules (loan)	23	(9)
1972–1982	Hércules	284	(33)
- * Club domestic league appearances and goals

Juan Baena Ruiz (18 May 1950 – 28 September 2012) was a Spanish footballer who played as a central defender.

Born in Ceuta, Baena began playing football in the Real Betis youth system. He made his debut with the senior side during the 1969–70 Segunda División season before going on loan to CD Logroñés. Next, he joined Hércules CF, where he helped the club gain promotion to La Liga. Manager Arsenio Iglesias moved Baena from forward to midfield and then to defense, where he excelled. In total, Baena made 224 La Liga appearances for Hércules.
