= Jean-Louis Heinrich =

French footballer (1943-2012)

Personal information
- Date of birth: 22 May 1943
- Place of birth: Ars-sur-Moselle, France
- Date of death: 15 September 2012 (aged 69)

Senior career*
Years	Team	Apps	(Gls)
1959–1966	Metz	106	(2)
1966–1969	Monaco		
1969–1970	Metz	0	(0)
- * Club domestic league appearances and goals

Jean-Louis Heinrich (22 May 1943 – 15 September 2012) was a French professional footballer who played as a goalkeeper.

== Career ==
Born in Ars-sur-Moselle, Heinrich played for Metz and Monaco.
