= Jimmy McGill (footballer, born 1926) =

Scottish footballer

Personal information
- Full name: James McGill
- Date of birth: 10 March 1926
- Place of birth: Kilsyth, Scotland
- Date of death: 21 April 2013 (aged 87)
- Place of death: Cumbernauld, Scotland
- Position: Forward

Senior career*
| Years | Team | Apps | (Gls) |
- Maryhill Harp
| 1946–1947 | Bury | 1 | (0) |
| 1947–1948 | Derby County | 8 | (0) |
| 1949–1951 | Kilmarnock | 16 | (2) |
| 1951–1953 | Berwick Rangers | | |
| 1953–1958 | Queen of the South | 122 | (24) |
| 1958–1959 | Cowdenbeath | 13 | (1) |
| Total | | 160 | (25) |
- * Club domestic league appearances and goals

Jimmy McGill (10 March 1926 – 21 April 2013) was a Scottish former footballer who played as a forward.

McGill was best known for his time with Queen of the South where he was part of the Palmerston Park club's front-line, alongside Bobby Black, Jim Patterson, Jackie Oakes and Walter Rothera. McGill also played for Derby County, Kilmarnock, Berwick Rangers and Cowdenbeath.

McGill died at a care home in Cumbernauld at the age of 87 after suffering from dementia.
