= Philippe Di Santo =

Belgian footballer (1950–2012)

Philippe Di Santo (2 April 1950 – 23 October 2012) was a Belgian footballer who played professionally for Charleroi, Sint-Truiden and Italian club Pescara Calcio. After he retired from playing, Di Santo coached the youth side of K.A.S. Eupen.
