= Bohdan Tsap =

Ukrainian footballer and coach

Personal information
- Full name: Bohdan Stepanovych Tsap
- Date of birth: 30 April 1941
- Place of birth: Horodok, Lviv Oblast, Ukrainian SSR
- Date of death: 6 November 2012 (aged 71)
- Place of death: Horodok, Lviv Oblast, Ukraine
- Height: 1.65 m (5 ft 5 in)
- Position: Defender

Youth career
- 195?–1958: FC Dynamo Lviv
- 1958–1961: SKA Lviv

Senior career*
| Years | Team | Apps | (Gls) |
| 1961–1962 | SKA-2 Lviv | ? | (?) |
| 1963–1965 | FC Kolhospnyk Rivne | 68 | (4) |
| 1966–1969 | SKA Lviv | 139 | (2) |
| 1970–1972 | FC Lokomotyv Vinnytsia | 97 | (0) |
| 1973–1979 | FC Sokil Lviv | ? | (?) |

Managerial career
- 1981–1989: FC Karpaty Lviv youth school (coach)
- 1989–2012: FC Karpaty Lviv youth school (director)
- * Club domestic league appearances and goals

Bohdan Stepanovich Tsap (Ukrainian: Богдан Степанович Цап; 30 April 1941 – 6 November 2012) was a Ukrainian professional football coach and player.

== Playing and coaching career ==
Tsap made his professional career in the different football teams of the Ukrainian SSR.

Since 1981 he worked as an assistant manager with FC Karpaty Lviv youth school. From 1989 to his retirement in July 2012 he served as Director of this school. He was the first trainer for footballers Vasyl Kardash, Vitaliy Postranskyi, Oleh Boychyshyn, Andriy Hayduk.

== Death ==
Tsap died on 6 November 2012 at the age of 71.

== Honours ==
- with Carpathian Military District Team

champion among Soviet Army teams: 1963.
