= Jackie Watters =

Scottish footballer

John Watters (c. 1920 – 12 August 2012) was a Scottish footballer who played for Celtic and Airdrieonians and later went on to become physio at Sunderland. He served as a medic in the Royal Navy during the Second World War.
