= Trevor Kemp =

Scottish footballer

Personal information
- Full name: Trevor John Kemp
- Date of birth: c. 1944
- Place of birth: Scotland
- Date of death: 15 October 2012 (aged 67–68)
- Position: Midfielder

Youth career
- Shielfield Juniors

Senior career*
Years	Team	Apps	(Gls)
1961–1964	Berwick Rangers	31	(4)
1965	Melbourne Hungaria		
- * Club domestic league appearances and goals

Trevor John Kemp (died 15 October 2012) was a Scottish footballer who played as a midfielder.

Kemp played his junior football for Shielfield Juniors before playing between 1961 and 1964 for Scottish Second Division club Berwick Rangers. In 1965 he played for Australian team Melbourne Hungaria.
