= Hughie Hay =

Scottish footballer

Personal information
- Place of birth: Aberdeen, Scotland
- Date of death: 23 October 2012 (aged 80)
- Place of death: Laurencekirk, Scotland
- Height: 1.79 m (5 ft 10 1/2 in)
- Position: Inside forward

Senior career*
Years	Team	Apps	(Gls)
- Banks O' Dee
1951–1958	Aberdeen	47	(23)
1958–1959	Dundee United	15	(3)
1959–1960	Arbroath	6	(1)
- Deveronvale
Total		68	(27)
- * Club domestic league appearances and goals

Hughie Hay (died 23 October 2012) was a Scottish professional footballer who played as an inside forward.

== Career ==
Hay started his career with local club Banks O' Dee. He then joined Aberdeen in 1951, where he played as an inside forward. He made his début against Queen of the South at Pittodrie on 11 August 1951, a match in which he scored. Hay suffered a serious leg break in 1954 while on national service. This injury ruled him out for the entire 1954–55 season. Towards the later part of his Aberdeen career he scored a hat-trick against Airdrieonians in front of a crowd of 10,000. He left Aberdeen in 1958 after seven years at the club, having made 58 appearances scoring 26 goals. He went on to play for Dundee United, Arbroath and Deveronvale.

== Later life and death ==
Hay lived in Stonehaven in later life and was a member of the indoor bowling club. He died on 23 October 2012, at the age of 80. Hay who was survived by his wife Anne, was cremated at Aberdeen Crematorium in Hazlehead on 30 October 2012.
