= Emilio Pacione =

Scottish footballer (1920–2012)

Emilio Pacione (20 March 1920 – 25 August 2012) was a Scottish footballer who played as a winger best known for playing for Dundee United from 1945 to 1950.

Pacione was born on 20 March 1920. He also played for Lochee Harp, Coleraine and Brechin City.
