= 2015 in association football =

The following are the scheduled events of association football for the year 2015 throughout the world.

== Events ==
=== Men's national teams ===
==== CAF ====
- 17 January – 8 February: 2015 Africa Cup of Nations in Equatorial Guinea.
  - (gold) : Ivory Coast
  - (silver) : Ghana
  - (bronze) : DR Congo
  - 4th: Equatorial Guinea

==== AFC ====
- 9–31 January: 2015 AFC Asian Cup in Australia.
  - (gold) : Australia
  - (silver) : South Korea
  - (bronze) : United Arab Emirates
  - 4th: Iraq
- 23 December 2015 – 3 January 2016: 2015 SAFF Championship in India
  - (gold) : India
  - (silver) : Afghanistan

==== CONCACAF ====
- 7–26 July: 2015 CONCACAF Gold Cup in the United States and Canada.
  - (gold) : Mexico
  - (silver) : Jamaica
  - (bronze) : Panama
  - 4th: United States

==== CONMEBOL ====
- 11 June – 4 July: 2015 Copa América in Chile.
  - (gold) : Chile
  - (silver) : Argentina
  - (bronze) : Peru
  - 4th: Paraguay

=== Youth (Men) ===
==== CAF ====
- 15 February – 1 March: 2015 African U-17 Championship in Niger
  - (gold) : Mali
  - (silver) : South Africa
  - (bronze) : Guinea
  - 4th: Nigeria
- 8–22 March: 2015 African U-20 Championship in Senegal
  - (gold) : Nigeria
  - (silver) : Senegal
  - (bronze) : Ghana
  - 4th: Mali
- 28 November – 12 December: 2015 CAF U-23 Championship in Senegal
  - (gold) : Nigeria
  - (silver) : Algeria
  - (bronze) : South Africa
  - 4th: Senegal

==== CONCACAF ====
- 9–24 January: 2015 CONCACAF U-20 Championship in Jamaica
  - (gold) : Mexico
  - (silver) : Panama
- 27 February – 15 March: 2015 CONCACAF U-17 Championship in HON
  - (gold) : Mexico
  - (silver) : Honduras

==== CONMEBOL ====
- 14 January – 7 February: 2015 South American Youth Football Championship in Uruguay
  - (gold) : Argentina
  - (silver) : Colombia
  - (bronze) : Uruguay
  - 4th: Brazil
- 4–29 March: 2015 South American Under-17 Football Championship in Paraguay
  - (gold) : Brazil
  - (silver) : Argentina
  - (bronze) : Ecuador
  - 4th: Paraguay

==== FIFA ====
- 30 May – 20 June: 2015 FIFA U-20 World Cup in New Zealand
  - (gold) : Serbia
  - (silver) : Brazil
  - (bronze) : Mali
  - 4th: Senegal
- 17 October – 8 November: 2015 FIFA U-17 World Cup in Chile
  - (gold) : Nigeria
  - (silver) : Mali
  - (bronze) : Belgium
  - 4th: Mexico

==== OFC ====
- 13–26 January: 2015 OFC U-17 Championship in American Samoa and Samoa
  - (gold) : New Zealand
  - (silver) : Tahiti
  - (bronze) : Vanuatu
  - 4th: New Caledonia

==== UEFA ====
- 6–22 May: 2015 UEFA European Under-17 Championship in Bulgaria
  - (gold) : France
  - (silver) : Germany
- 17–30 June: 2015 UEFA European Under-21 Championship in the Czech Republic
  - (gold) : Sweden
  - (silver) : Portugal
- 6–19 July: 2015 UEFA European Under-19 Championship in Greece
  - (gold) : Spain
  - (silver) : Russia

=== Women's National Teams ===
- 6 June – 5 July: 2015 FIFA Women's World Cup in Canada
  - (gold) : United States
  - (silver) : Japan
  - (bronze) : England
  - 4th: Germany

=== Youth (Women) ===
==== AFC ====
- 19–30 August: 2015 AFC U-19 Women's Championship in China
  - (gold) : Japan
  - (silver) : North Korea
  - (bronze) : South Korea
  - 4th: China
- 4–15 November: 2015 AFC U-16 Women's Championship in China
  - (gold) : North Korea
  - (silver) : Japan
  - (bronze) : China
  - 4th: Thailand

==== UEFA ====
- 22 June – 4 July: 2015 UEFA Women's Under-17 Championship in Iceland
  - (gold) : Spain
  - (silver) : Switzerland
- 15–27 July: 2015 UEFA Women's Under-19 Championship in Israel
  - (gold) : Sweden
  - (silver) : Spain

=== Multi-sport events ===
==== Men's ====
- 29 May – 15 June: Southeast Asian Games in Singapore
  - (gold) : Thailand
  - (silver) : Myanmar
  - (bronze) : Vietnam
  - 4th: Indonesia
- 2–13 July: Summer Universiade in South Korea
  - (gold) : Italy
  - (silver) : South Korea
  - (bronze) : Japan
  - 4th: Brazil
- 3–17 July: Pacific Games in Port Moresby, Papua New Guinea
  - (gold) : New Caledonia
  - (silver) : Tahiti
  - (bronze) : Papua New Guinea
  - 4th: Fiji
- 11–26 July: Pan American Games in Toronto, Canada
  - (gold) : Uruguay
  - (silver) : Mexico
  - (bronze) : Brazil
  - 4th: Panama
- 3–18 September: All-Africa Games in Brazzaville, Republic of the Congo
  - (gold) : Senegal
  - (silver) : Burkina Faso
  - (bronze) : Nigeria
  - 4th: Congo

==== Women's ====
- 2–12 July: Summer Universiade in South Korea
  - (gold) : France
  - (silver) : Russia
  - (bronze) : Japan
  - 4th: Canada
- 6–16 July: Pacific Games in Port Moresby, Papua New Guinea
  - (gold) : Papua New Guinea
  - (silver) : New Caledonia
  - (bronze) : Cook Islands
  - 4th: Samoa
- 11–25 July: Pan American Games in Toronto, Canada
  - (gold) : Brazil
  - (silver) : Colombia
  - (bronze) : Mexico
  - 4th: Canada
- 3–18 September: All-Africa Games in Brazzaville, Republic of the Congo
  - (gold) : Ghana
  - (silver) : Cameroon
  - (bronze) : Ivory Coast
  - 4th: Nigeria

=== Regional ===
- 27 July – 9 August: 2015 AFF U-16 Youth Championship in Cambodia
  - (gold) : Thailand
  - (silver) : Myanmar
  - (bronze) : Australia
  - 4th: Laos

== News ==
=== February ===
- 5 February – The CAF Executive Committee decided to suspend the Morocco national football team from the next two editions of the Africa Cup of Nations, 2017 and 2019, and to impose on the Royal Moroccan Football Federation the regulatory fine of US$1 million, along with the sum of €8 million in compensation for all material damage sustained by CAF, stakeholders and partners as a result of the decision not to host the 2015 edition.

== Fixed dates for national team matches ==
Scheduled international matches per the FIFA International Match Calendar:

- 23–31 March
- 8–16 June
- July
- 31 August – 8 September
- 5–13 October
- 9–17 November

== Club continental champions ==
=== Men ===
Region	Tournament	Defending champion	Champion	Title	Last honor
AFC (Asia)	2015 AFC Champions League	(Australia) Western Sydney Wanderers	(China) Guangzhou Evergrande	2nd	2013
AFC (Asia)	2015 AFC Cup	(Kuwait) Qadsia	(Malaysia) Johor Darul Ta'zim F.C.	1st	—
AFC (Asia)	ASEAN 2015 Mekong Club Championship	(Vietnam) Binh Duong	(Thailand) Buriram United	1st	–
CAF (Africa)	2015 CAF Champions League	(Algeria) ES Sétif	(Democratic Republic of the Congo) TP Mazembe	5th	2010
CAF (Africa)	2015 CAF Confederation Cup	(Egypt) Al-Ahly	(Tunisia) Étoile du Sahel	2nd	2006
CAF (Africa)	2015 CAF Super Cup	(Egypt) Al-Ahly	(Algeria) ES Sétif	1st	—
CAF (Africa)	CECAFA 2015 Kagame Interclub Cup	(Sudan) Al-Merrikh SC	(Tanzania) Azam	1st	—
CAF (Africa)	UNAF 2015 UNAF Club Cup	—	(Morocco) Raja Casablanca	1st	—
CONCACAF (North and Central America, Caribbean)	2014–15 CONCACAF Champions League	(Mexico) Cruz Azul	(Mexico) América	6th	2006
CONCACAF (North and Central America, Caribbean)	2015 CFU Club Championship	(Puerto Rico) Bayamón (Jamaica) Waterhouse (Guyana) Alpha United	(Trinidad and Tobago) Central	1st	—
CONMEBOL (South America)	2015 Copa Libertadores	(Argentina) San Lorenzo	(Argentina) River Plate	3rd	1996
CONMEBOL (South America)	2015 Copa Sudamericana	(Argentina) River Plate	(Colombia) Santa Fe	1st	—
CONMEBOL (South America)	2015 Recopa Sudamericana	(Brazil) Atlético Mineiro	(Argentina) River Plate	1st	—
OFC (Oceania)	2014–15 OFC Champions League	(New Zealand) Auckland City	(New Zealand) Auckland City	7th	2014
OFC (Oceania)	2015 OFC President's Cup	(New Zealand) Auckland City			
OFC (Oceania)	2015 Melanesian Super Cup	(Solomon Islands) Solomon Warriors F.C.	(Solomon Islands) Solomon Warriors F.C.	2nd	2014
UEFA (Europe)	2014–15 UEFA Champions League	(Spain) Real Madrid	(Spain) Barcelona	5th	2011
UEFA (Europe)	2014–15 UEFA Europa League	(Spain) Sevilla	(Spain) Sevilla	4th	2014
UEFA (Europe)	2015 UEFA Super Cup	(Spain) Real Madrid	(Spain) Barcelona	5th	2011
UAFA (Arab States)	2015 GCC Club Cup	(United Arab Emirates) Al-Nasr	(United Arab Emirates) Al-Shabab	3rd	2011
FIFA (Worldwide)	2015 FIFA Club World Cup	(Spain) Real Madrid	(Spain) Barcelona	3rd	2011

=== Women ===
Region	Tournament	Defending Champion	Champion	Title	Last honor
CONMEBOL (South America)	2015 Copa Libertadores Femenina	(Brazil) São José	(Brazil) Ferroviária	1st	
UEFA (Europe)	2014–15 UEFA Women's Champions League	(Germany) VfL Wolfsburg	(Germany) 1. FFC Frankfurt	4th	2007–08

== Domestic leagues ==
=== CONCACAF nations ===
==== Men ====
Nation	Tournament	Champion	Title	Last honor
Anguilla	2014–15 AFA Senior Male League	Kicks United	4th	2011–12
Aruba	2014–15 Aruban Division di Honor	Racing Club Aruba	14th	2011–12
Antigua and Barbuda	2014–15 Antigua and Barbuda Premier Division	Parham	4th	2010–11
(The Bahamas) Bahamas	2014–15 BFA Senior League	Not completed		
Barbados	2014–15 Barbados Premier Division	Barbados Defence Force	5th	2013–14
Belize	2015 Closing Season	Verdes	2nd	2007–08
Belize	2015 Opening Season	Police United FC (Belize)	2nd	2013
Bermuda	2014-15 Bermudian Premier Division	Somerset Trojans	10th	1992–93
Bonaire	2015 Bonaire League			
British Virgin Islands	2014–15 BVIFA National Football League	Islanders FC	6th	2013–14
Cayman Islands	2014–15 Cayman Islands Premier League	Scholars International	18th	2011–12
Costa Rica	2015 Verano	Herediano	24th	Verano 2013
Costa Rica	2015 Invierno	Deportivo Saprissa	32nd	2014 Invierno
Cuba	2015 Campeonato Nacional de Fútbol de Cuba	Camagüey	1st	N/A
Curaçao	2015 Curaçao League	RKSV Centro Dominguito	4th	2013
Dominica	2014–15 Dominica Premiere League	Exodus	1st	N/A
Dominican Republic	2015 Liga Dominicana de Fútbol	Pantoja	1st	N/A
El Salvador	Primera División de Fútbol Profesional - Clausura 2015	Santa Tecla	1st	N/A
El Salvador	Primera División de Fútbol Profesional - Apertura 2015	Alianza F.C.	11th	Clausura 2011
French Guiana	2014–15 French Guiana Championnat National	Cayenne	7th	1995–96
Grenada	2015 Grenada League	Carib Hurricane FC	4th	2008
Guadeloupe	2014–15 Guadeloupe Division d'Honneur	Moulien	12th	2013–14
Guatemala	Clausura 2015	Comunicaciones	30th	Apertura 2014
Guatemala	Apertura 2015	Antigua GFC	1st	N/A
Guyana	2014-15 GFF National Super League	Not played		
Guyana	2015 Genesis round	Slingerz FC	1st	N/A
Honduras	Clausura 2015	Olimpia	29th	Clausura 2014
Honduras	Apertura 2015	C.D. Honduras Progreso	1st	N/A
Haiti	Clôture 2015	Don Bosco	4th	Clôture 2014
Haiti	Ouverture 2015	Baltimore SC	5th	Ouverture 2011
Jamaica	2014–15 National Premier League	Arnett Gardens	4th	2001–02
Martinique	Martinique Championnat National - 2014/15	Golden Lion	1st	N/A
Mexico	2015 Liga MX Clausura	Santos Laguna	5th	Clausura 2012
Mexico	2015 Liga MX Apertura	Tigres UANL	4th	Apertura 2011
Montserrat	2015 Montserrat Championship	Not played		
Nicaragua	Clausura 2015	Real Estelí	16th	2014 A
Nicaragua	Apertura 2015	UNAN Managua	1st	N/A
Panama	Clausura 2015	Árabe Unido	12th	Apertura 2012
Panama	Apertura 2015	Árabe Unido	13th	Clausura 2015
Puerto Rico	2015 Liga Nacional de Fútbol de Puerto Rico	Criollos de Caguas FC	1st	N/A
Saint Kitts and Nevis	Saint Kitts and Nevis Premier Division 2014-15	St. Paul's United	4th	2013–14
Saint Lucia	Saint Lucia Gold Division 2014-15	Not played		
(Collectivity of Saint Martin) Saint Martin	Saint-Martin Championships 2014-15	Attackers	8th	2012–13
Saint Vincent and the Grenadines	NLA Premier League 2015	Hope International FC	3rd	2005–06
Sint Maarten	Sint Maarten League 2014-15	Flames United	1st	N/A
Suriname	2014–15 SVB Hoofdklasse	Inter Moengotapoe	7th	2013–14
Turks and Caicos Islands	WIV Provo Premier League 2014–15	AFC Academy	3rd	2014
Trinidad and Tobago	2014–15 TT Pro League	Central	1st	N/A
(United States Virgin Islands) U.S. Virgin Islands	2014–15 U.S. Virgin Islands Championship	Helenites	4th	2013–14
United States	2015 Major League Soccer	Portland Timbers	1st	—
United States	2015 Major League Soccer Supporters' Shield	New York Red Bulls	2nd	2013

==== Women ====
Nation	Tournament	Champion	Title	Last honor
United States	2015 National Women's Soccer League	FC Kansas City	2nd	2014

=== CONMEBOL nations ===
Nation	Tournament	Champion	Title	Last honor
Argentina	2015 Argentine Primera División	Boca Juniors	31st	2011 Apertura
Bolivia	2015 Liga de Fútbol Profesional Boliviano Clausura	Bolívar	24th	2014 Apertura
Bolivia	2015 Liga de Fútbol Profesional Boliviano Apertura	Sport Boys Warnes	1st	—
Brazil	2015 Campeonato Brasileiro Série A	Corinthians	6th	2011
Chile	2015 Chilean Primera División Clausura	Cobresal	1st	—
Chile	2015 Chilean Primera División Apertura	U. Católica	11th	Clausura, 2010
Colombia	2015 Categoría Primera A Apertura	Deportivo Cali	9th	2005-II
Colombia	2015 Categoría Primera A Finalización	Atlético Nacional	15th	Apertura 2014
Ecuador	2015 Campeonato Ecuatoriano de Fútbol Serie A	Club Sport Emelec	13th	2014
Paraguay	2015 Paraguayan Primera División Apertura	Cerro Porteño	31st	2013 Clausura
Paraguay	2015 Paraguayan Primera División Clausura	Club Olimpia	40th	2011 Clausura
Peru	2015 Torneo Descentralizado	FBC Melgar	2nd	1981
Venezuela	2014–15 Venezuelan Primera División season	Deportivo Táchira	8th	2010–11
Uruguay	2014–15 Uruguayan Primera División season	Nacional	45th	2011–12

=== AFC nations ===
==== Men ====
Nation	Tournament	Champion	Title	Last honor
Afghanistan	2015 Afghan Premier League	De Spin Ghar Bazan F.C.	1st	—
Australia	2014–15 A-League	Melbourne Victory	3rd	2008–09
Bahrain	2014–15 Bahrain First Division League	Muharraq Club	33rd	2010–11
Bangladesh	2015 Bangladesh Football Premier League	Sheikh Jamal Dhanmondi Club	3rd	2013–14
Bhutan	2015 Bhutan National League	F.C. Terton	1st	—
Brunei	2015 Brunei Super League	MS ABDB	2nd	1985
Cambodia	2015 Metfone C-League	Phnom Penh Crown FC	6th	2014
China	2015 Chinese Super League	Guangzhou Evergrande Taobao F.C.	5th	2014
(Timor-Leste) East Timor	2015 Pro Liga de Timor Leste			
Guam	2014–15 Guam Men's Soccer League	Rovers FC	2nd	2013–14
Hong Kong	2014–15 Hong Kong Premier League	Kitchee	7th	2013–14
India	2014–15 I-League	Mohun Bagan	4th	2001–02
India	2015 Indian Super League	Chennaiyin FC	1st	—
Indonesia	2015 Indonesia Super League	Not completed		
Iran	2014–15 Persian Gulf Pro League	Sepahan	5th	2011–12
Iraq	2014–15 Iraqi Premier League	Naft Al-Wasat	1st	—
Japan	2015 J1 League	Sanfrecce Hiroshima	8th	2013
Jordan	2014–15 Jordan League	Al-Wehdat	14th	2013/14
Kyrgyzstan	2015 Kyrgyzstan League	FC Alay	2nd	2013
Kuwait	2014–15 Kuwaiti Premier League	Kuwait SC	12th	2012–13
Laos	2015 Lao Premier League	Lao Toyota F.C.	1st	—
Lebanon	2014–15 Lebanese Premier League	Al Ahed	4th	2010–11
Macau	2015 Campeonato da 1ª Divisão do Futebol	Benfica de Macau	2nd	2014
Malaysia	2015 Malaysia Super League	Johor Darul Ta'zim F.C.	3rd	2014
Maldives	2015 Dhivehi Premier League	New Radiant S.C.	5th	2014
Mongolia	2015 Mongolian Premier League	Erchim FC	9th	2013
Myanmar	2015 Myanmar National League	Yangon United F.C.	4th	2013
Nepal	2015 Nepal National League	Three Star Club	5th	2012–13
North Korea	2015 DPR Korea League	April 25 Sports Club	15th	2013
Northern Mariana Islands	2014–15 M*League Division 1	Tan Holdings FC	2nd	2012 (Fall)
Oman	2014–15 Oman Professional League	Al-Oruba	4th	2007–08
Pakistan	2014–15 Pakistan Premier League	KESC F.C.	1st	—
Palestine	2014–15 West Bank Premier League	Shabab Al-Dhahiriya	2nd	2012–13
Palestine	2014–15 Gaza Strip Premier League	Al-Ittihad Shejaia	1st	—
Philippines	2015 United Football League	Ceres F.C.	1st	—
Qatar	2014–15 Qatar Stars League	Lekhwiya SC	4th	2013–14
Saudi Arabia	2014–15 Saudi Professional League	Al-Nassr	7th	2013–14
Singapore	2015 S.League	Brunei DPMM FC	1st	—
South Korea	2015 K League Classic	Jeonbuk Hyundai Motors FC	4th	2014
Sri Lanka	2014–15 Sri Lanka Football Premier League	Solid SC	1st	—
Syria	2014–15 Syrian Premier League	Al-Jaish SC	13th	2012–13
(Chinese Taipei) Taiwan	2015 Intercity Football League	Taiwan Power Company	6th	2014
Tajikistan	2015 Tajik League	FC Istiklol	4th	2014
Thailand	2015 Thai Premier League	Buriram United		
Turkmenistan	2015 Ýokary Liga	Altyn Asyr FK	2nd	2014
United Arab Emirates	2014–15 UAE Pro-League	Al-Ain	12th	2012–13
Uzbekistan	2015 Uzbek League	Pakhtakor Tashkent FK	11th	2014
Vietnam	2015 V.League 1	Becamex Bình Dương F.C.	4th	2014
Yemen	2014–15 Yemeni League	Not played		

==== Women ====
Nation	Tournament	Champion	Title	Last honor
Japan	2015 Nadeshiko League	Nippon TV Beleza	13th	2010
Vietnam	2015 Vietnamese Women's Championships	Ho Chi Minh City	5th	2010

=== UEFA nations ===
==== Men ====
Nation	Tournament	Champion	Title	Last honor
Albania	2014–15 Albanian Superliga	Skënderbeu Korçë	6th	2013–14
Andorra	2014–15 Primera Divisió	Santa Coloma	9th	2013–14
Armenia	2014–15 Armenian Premier League	Pyunik	14th	2010
Austria	2014–15 Austrian Football Bundesliga	Red Bull Salzburg	9th	2013–14
Azerbaijan	2014–15 Azerbaijan Premier League	Qarabağ	3rd	2013–14
Belarus	2015 Belarusian Premier League	FC BATE Borisov	12th	2014
Belgium	2014–15 Belgian Pro League	Gent	1st	–
Bosnia and Herzegovina	2014–15 Premier League of Bosnia and Herzegovina	Sarajevo	3rd	2006–07
Bulgaria	2014–15 A PFG	Ludogorets Razgrad	4th	2013–14
Croatia	2014–15 Prva HNL	Dinamo Zagreb	17th	2013–14
Cyprus	2014–15 Cypriot First Division	APOEL	24th	2013–14
Czech Republic	2014–15 Gambrinus liga	Viktoria Plzen	3rd	2012–13
Denmark	2014–15 Danish Superliga	Midtjylland	1st	—
England	2014–15 Premier League	Chelsea	5th	2009–10
Estonia	2015 Meistriliiga	FC Flora	10th	2011
Faroe Islands	2015 Effodeildin	B36	11th	2014
Finland	2015 Veikkausliiga	SJK	1st	–
France	2014–15 Ligue 1	Paris Saint-Germain	5th	2013–14
(Georgia (country)) Georgia	2014–15 Umaglesi Liga	Dila Gori	1st	–
Germany	2014–15 Bundesliga	Bayern Munich	25th	2013–14
Gibraltar	2014–15 Gibraltar Premier Division	Lincoln Red Imps	21st	2013–14
Greece	2014–15 Super League Greece	Olympiacos	42nd	2013–14
Hungary	2014–15 Nemzeti Bajnokság I	Videoton	2nd	2010–11
Iceland	2015 Úrvalsdeild	FH	7th	2012
(Republic of Ireland) Ireland	2015 League of Ireland	Dundalk F.C.	11th	2014
Israel	2014–15 Israeli Premier League	Maccabi Tel Aviv	22nd	2013–14
Italy	2014–15 Serie A	Juventus	31st	2013–14
Kazakhstan	2015 Kazakhstan Premier League	FC Astana	2nd	2014
Latvia	2015 Latvian Higher League	FK Liepāja	1st	—
Lithuania	2015 A Lyga	FC Žalgiris	6th	2014
Luxembourg	2014–15 Luxembourg National Division	Fola Esch	7th	2012–13
(North Macedonia) Macedonia	2014–15 First Macedonian Football League	Vardar	8th	2012–13
Malta	2014–15 Maltese Premier League	Hibernians	11th	2008–09
Moldova	2014–15 Moldovan National Division	Milsami Orhei	1st	–
Montenegro	2014–15 Montenegrin First League	Rudar Pljevlja	2nd	2009–10
Netherlands	2014–15 Eredivisie	PSV	22nd	2007–08
Northern Ireland	2014–15 NIFL Premiership	Crusaders	5th	1996–97
Norway	2015 Tippeligaen	Rosenborg BK	23rd	2010
Poland	2014–15 Ekstraklasa	Lech Poznań	7th	2009–10
Portugal	2014–15 Primeira Liga	Benfica	34th	2013–14
Romania	2014–15 Liga I	Steaua București	26th	2013–14
Russia	2014–15 Russian Premier League	Zenit St. Petersburg	5th	2011–12
San Marino	2014–15 Campionato Sammarinese di Calcio	Folgore	4th	1999–00
Scotland	2014–15 Scottish Premiership	Celtic	46th	2013–14
Serbia	2014–15 Serbian SuperLiga	Partizan	7th	2012–13
Slovakia	2014–15 Slovak First Football League	Trenčín	1st	–
Slovenia	2014–15 Slovenian PrvaLiga	Maribor	13th	2013–14
Spain	2014–15 La Liga	FC Barcelona	23rd	2012–13
Sweden	2015 Allsvenskan	IFK Norrköping	13th	1992
Switzerland	2014–15 Swiss Super League	FC Basel	18th	2013–14
Turkey	2014–15 Süper Lig	Galatasaray	20th	2012–13
Ukraine	2014–15 Ukrainian Premier League	Dynamo Kyiv	27th	2008–09
Wales	2014–15 Welsh Premier League	The New Saints	9th	2013–14

==== Women ====
Nation	Tournament	Champion	Title	Last honor
Belgium/ Netherlands	2014–15 BeNe League	Standard Fémina	1st	—
Croatia	2014–15 Prva HNLŽ	Osijek	19th	2013–14
Cyprus	2014–15 Cypriot First Division			
Czech Republic	2014–15 Czech First Division	Slavia Praha	4th	2013–14
Denmark	2014–15 Elitedivisionen			
England	2015 FA WSL1	Chelsea	1st	—
France	2014–15 Division 1 Féminine	Lyon	13th	2013–14
Germany	2014–15 Frauen-Bundesliga	Bayern Munich	2nd	1976
Norway	2015 Toppserien			
Romania	2014–15 Superliga			
Scotland	2015 Scottish Women's Premier League	Glasgow City	10th	2014
Slovenia	2014–15 Slovenian Women's League	Pomurje Beltinci	5	2013–14
Spain	2014–15 Primera División	FC Barcelona	4th	2013–14
Sweden	2015 Damallsvenskan	Rosengård	10th	2014
Wales	2014–15 Welsh Premier League	Cardiff Met. Ladies	3rd	2013–14

=== CAF nations ===
Nation	Tournament	Champion	Title	Last honor
Algeria	2014–15 Algerian Ligue Professionnelle 1	ES Sétif	7th	2012–13
Angola	2015 Girabola	C.R.D. Libolo	4th	2014
Benin	2014–15 Benin Premier League			
Botswana	2014–15 Botswana Premier League	Mochudi Centre Chiefs	4th	2012–13
Burkina Faso	2014–15 Burkinabé Premier League	RC Bobo	4th	1997
Burundi	2014–15 Burundi Premier League	Vital'O FC	19th	2011–12
Cameroon	2015 Elite One	Coton Sport FC de Garoua	14th	2014
Cape Verde	2015 Campeonato Nacional de Cabo Verde	CS Mindelense	20th	2014
Central African Republic	2014–15 Central African Republic League			
Chad	2015 Chad Premier League	AS CotonTchad	3rd	1998
Comoros	2015 Comoros Premier League	Volcan Club de Moroni	1st	—
(Republic of the Congo) Congo	2015 Congo Premier League	Not completed		
(Democratic Republic of the Congo) DR Congo	2014–15 Linafoot	AS Vita Club	13th	2009–10
Djibouti	2014–15 Djibouti Premier League	AS Ali Sabieh Djibouti Télécom	4th	2013–14
Egypt	2014–15 Egyptian Premier League	Zamalek SC	12th	2003–04
Equatorial Guinea	2015 Liga Semiprofesional de Guinea Ecuatorial	Racing de Micomeseng	1st	—
Eritrea	2015 Eritrean Premier League			
Ethiopia	2014–15 Ethiopian Premier League	Saint-George SA	27th	2013–14
Gabon	2014–15 Championnat National D1	AS Mangasport	8th	2014
(The Gambia) Gambia	2014–15 GFA League First Division	GAMTEL	1st	—
Ghana	2015 Ghanaian Premier League	Ashanti Gold SC	4th	1995–96
Guinea	2014–15 Guinée Championnat National	Horoya AC	13th	2013
Guinea-Bissau	2015 Campeonato Nacional da Guiné-Bissau	Sport Bissau e Benfica	10th	2010
Ivory Coast	2014–15 Ligue 1	AS Tanda	1st	—
Kenya	2015 Kenyan Premier League	Gor Mahia	15th	2014
Lesotho	2014–15 Lesotho Premier League	Lioli FC	4th	2012/13
Liberia	2014–15 Liberian Premier League	Nimba United FC	1st	—
Libya	2014–15 Libyan Premier League	Not played		
Madagascar	2015 THB Champions League	CNaPS Sport	4th	2014
Malawi	2014-15 Malawi Premier Division	Big Bullets	11th	2005–06
Mali	2014–15 Malian Première Division	Stade Malien	20th	2013–14
Mauritania	2014–15 Mauritanian Premier League	FC Tevragh-Zeina	2nd	2012
Mauritius	2015 Mauritian League	Curepipe Starlight SC	4th	2013–14
Morocco	2014-15 Botola	Wydad Casablanca	18th	2009–10
Mozambique	2015 Moçambola	Clube Ferroviário de Maputo	10th	2009
Namibia	2014-15 Namibia Premier League	African Stars	3rd	2009–10
Niger	2014–15 Niger Premier League	AS Douanes (Niamey)	2nd	2013
Nigeria	2015 Nigeria Professional Football League	Enyimba International F.C.	7th	2010
Rwanda	2014–15 Rwanda National Football League	APR FC	15th	2013–14
Réunion	2015 Réunion Premier League	JS Saint-Pierroise	17th	2014
São Tomé and Príncipe	2015 São Tomé and Príncipe Championship	Sporting Praia Cruz	7th	2013
Senegal	2014–15 Senegal Premier League	AS Douanes	6th	2008
Seychelles	2015 Seychelles First Division	St Michel United FC	13th	2014
Sierra Leone	2014–15 Sierra Leone National Premier League			
Somalia	2014–15 Somali First Division	Somali Police Heegan FC	2nd	1967
South Africa	2014–15 South African Premier Division	Kaizer Chiefs	12th	2012–13
South Sudan	2015 South Sudan Football Championship	Atlabara FC	2nd	2013
Sudan	2015 Sudan Premier League	Al-Merrikh SC	20th	2013
(Eswatini) Swaziland	2014–15 Swazi Premier League	Royal Leopards	5th	2013/14
Tanzania	2014–15 Tanzanian Premier League	Young Africans	20th	2012–13
Togo	2015 Togolese Championnat National			
Tunisia	2014–15 Tunisian Ligue Professionnelle 1	Club Africain	13th	2007–08
Uganda	2014-15 Uganda Super League	Vipers SC	2nd	2009–10
Zambia	2015 Zambian Premier League	ZESCO United F.C.	5th	2014
Zanzibar	2015 Zanzibar Premier League	Mafunzo FC	3rd	2011
Zimbabwe	2015 Zimbabwe Premier Soccer League	Chicken Inn F.C.	1st	—

=== OFC nations ===
Nation	Tournament	Champion	Title	Last honor
American Samoa	2015 FFAS Senior League	Utulei Youth	2nd	2014
Cook Islands	2015 Cook Islands Round Cup	Tupapa Maraerenga F.C.	12th	2014
Fiji	2015 National Football League	Nadi FC	9th	2000
Kiribati	2015 Kiribati National Championship			
New Caledonia	2015 New Caledonia Super Ligue	Hienghène Sport	1st	—
New Zealand	2014–15 ASB Premiership	Auckland City FC	6th	2013–14
Niue	2015 Niue Soccer Tournament			
Papua New Guinea	2015 Papua New Guinea National Soccer League	Lae City Dwellers	1st	—
Samoa	2014–15 Samoa Men's Premier League	Lupe ole Soaga	2nd	2012–13
Solomon Islands	2014–15 Telekom S-League	Western United F.C.	1st	—
(French Polynesia) Tahiti	2014–15 Tahitian Ligue 1	A.S. Tefana	4th	2011
Tonga	2014/15 Tonga Major League	Veitongo FC	2nd	1978
Tuvalu	2015 Tuvalu A-Division			
Vanuatu	2014–15 TVL Premier League	Amicale FC	6th	2013–14

== Domestic cups ==
=== UEFA nations ===
Nation	Tournament	Champion	Title	Last honor
Albania	2014–15 Albanian Cup	Laçi	2nd	2012–13
Albania	2015 Albanian Supercup	Laçi	1st	—
Andorra	2015 Copa Constitució	Sant Julià	5th	2014
Andorra	2015 Andorran Supercup	FC Santa Coloma	5th	2008
Armenia	2014–15 Armenian Cup	FC Pyunik	8th	2013–14
Armenia	2015 Armenian Supercup	FC Pyunik	9th	2011
Austria	2014–15 Austrian Cup	Red Bull Salzburg	3rd	2013–14
Azerbaijan	2014–15 Azerbaijan Cup	Qarabağ	4th	2008–09
Azerbaijan	2015 Azerbaijan Supercup	Not Held		
Belarus	2014–15 Belarusian Cup	BATE Borisov	3rd	2010
Belarus	2015 Belarusian Super Cup	BATE Borisov	5th	2014
Belgium	2014–15 Belgian Cup	Club Brugge KV	11th	2006–07
Belgium	2015 Belgian Super Cup	K.A.A. Gent	1st	—
Bosnia and Herzegovina	2014–15 Bosnia and Herzegovina Football Cup	FK Olimpic	1st	—
Bulgaria	2014–15 Bulgarian Cup	Cherno More Varna	1st	—
Bulgaria	2015 Bulgarian Supercup	Cherno More Varna	1st	—
Croatia	2014–15 Croatian Cup	Dinamo Zagreb	13th	2011–12
Cyprus	2014–15 Cypriot Cup	APOEL	21st	2013–14
Cyprus	2015 Cypriot Super Cup	AEL Limassol	4th	1985
Czech Republic	2014–15 Czech Cup	Slovan Liberec	2nd	1999–2000
Czech Republic	2015 Czech Supercup	FC Viktoria Plzeň	2nd	2011
Denmark	2014–15 Danish Cup	Copenhagen	6th	2011–12
England	2014-15 FA Cup	Arsenal	12th	2013–14
England	2014–15 Football League Cup	Chelsea	5th	2007–08
England	2015 FA Community Shield	Arsenal	14th	2014
Estonia	2014–15 Estonian Cup	Nõmme Kalju	1st	——
Estonia	2015 Estonian Supercup	Levadia Tallinn	6th	2013
Finland	2015 Finnish Cup	IFK Mariehamn	1st	—
Finland	2015 Finnish League Cup	HJK Helsinki	5th	1998
Faroe Islands	2015 Faroe Islands Cup	Víkingur	5th	2014
Faroe Islands	2015 Faroe Islands Super Cup	Víkingur	2nd	2014
France	2014–15 Coupe de France	Paris SG	9th	2009–10
France	2014–15 Coupe de la Ligue	Paris SG	5th	2013–14
France	2015 Trophée des Champions	Paris SG	5th	2014
Germany	2014–15 DFB-Pokal	VfL Wolfsburg	1st	—
Germany	2015 DFL-Supercup	VfL Wolfsburg	1st	—
(Georgia (country)) Georgia	2014–15 Georgian Cup	Dinamo Tbilisi	12th	2014
(Georgia (country)) Georgia	2015 Georgian Super Cup	Dinamo Tbilisi	7th	2014
Gibraltar	2014–15 Gibraltar Premier Cup	College Europa	1st	—
Gibraltar	2015 Rock Cup	Lincoln Red Imps	16th	2013–14
Greece	2014–15 Greek Football Cup	Olympiacos	27th	2012–13
Hungary	2014–15 Magyar Kupa	Ferencvárosi TC	21st	2004
Hungary	2015 Szuperkupa	Ferencvárosi TC	5th	2004
Iceland	2015 Deildabikar	Breiðablik UBK	2nd	2013
Iceland	2015 Icelandic Super Cup	Stjarnan	1st	—
(Republic of Ireland) Ireland	2015 FAI Cup	Dundalk	10th	2002
(Republic of Ireland) Ireland	2015 League of Ireland Cup	St Patrick's Athletic F.C.	3rd	2003
(Republic of Ireland) Ireland	President's Cup (Super)	Dundalk	1st	—
(Republic of Ireland) Ireland	2015 Setanta Sports Cup	Not Held		
Israel	2014–15 Israel State Cup	Maccabi Tel Aviv	23rd	2004–05
Israel	2014–15 Toto Cup Al	Maccabi Tel Aviv	4th	2008–09
Italy	2014–15 Coppa Italia	Juventus	10th	1994–95
Italy	2015 Supercoppa Italiana	Juventus	7th	2013
Latvia	2014–15 Latvian Football Cup	Jelgava	5th	2013–14
Latvia	2015 Virsligas Winter Cup	Skonto FC	2nd	2014
Kazakhstan	2015 Kazakhstan Cup	FC Kairat	7th	2014
Kazakhstan	2015 Kazakhstan Super Cup	Astana	2nd	2011
Liechtenstein	2014–15 Liechtenstein Cup	FC Vaduz	43rd	2013–14
Lithuania	2014–15 Lithuanian Football Cup	Žalgiris Vilnius	9th	2013–14
Lithuania	2015 Lithuanian Supercup	Not Held		
Luxembourg	2014–15 Luxembourg Cup	Differdange 03	4th	2013–14
(North Macedonia) Macedonia	2014–15 Macedonian Football Cup	Rabotnički	4th	2013–14
(North Macedonia) Macedonia	2015 Macedonian Football Super Cup	FK Vardar	2nd	2013
Malta	2014–15 Maltese FA Trophy	Birkirkara	5th	2007–08
Malta	2015 Maltese Super Cup	Hibernians F.C.	3rd	2007
Moldova	2014–15 Moldovan Cup	FC Sheriff	8th	2009–10
Moldova	2015 Moldovan Super Cup	FC Sheriff	6th	2013
Montenegro	2014–15 Montenegrin Cup	Mladost	1st	—
Netherlands	2014–15 KNVB Cup	FC Groningen	1st	—
Netherlands	2015 Johan Cruijff Schaal	PSV Eindhoven	10th	2012
Northern Ireland	2014–15 Irish Cup	Glentoran	22nd	2012–13
Northern Ireland	2014–15 Northern Ireland Football League Cup	Cliftonville	4th	2013–14
Northern Ireland	2014–15 Irish Intermediate Cup	Carrick Rangers	4th	2010–11
Northern Ireland	2015 NIFL Charity Shield	Glentoran	2nd	1992
Poland	2014–15 Polish Cup	Legia Warsaw	17th	2012–13
Poland	2015 Polish SuperCup	Lech Poznań	5th	2009
Portugal	2014–15 Taça de Portugal	Sporting CP	16th	2007–08
Portugal	2014–15 Taça da Liga	Benfica	6th	2013–14
Portugal	2015 Supertaça Cândido de Oliveira	Sporting CP	8th	2008
Romania	2014–15 Cupa României	FC Steaua București	22nd	2010–11
Romania	2014–15 Cupa Ligii	FC Steaua București	1st	—
Romania	2015 Supercupa României	ASA 2013 Târgu Mureș	1st	—
Russia	2014–15 Russian Cup	Lokomotiv Moscow	8th	2006–07
Russia	2015 Russian Super Cup	Zenit Saint Petersburg	3rd	2011
San Marino	2014–15 Coppa Titano	Folgore Falciano Calcio	1st	—
Scotland	2014–15 Scottish Cup	Inverness CT	1st	—
Scotland	2014–15 Scottish Challenge Cup	Livingston	1st	—
Scotland	2014–15 Scottish League Cup	Celtic	15th	2008–09
Serbia	2014–15 Serbian Cup	Čukarički	1st	—
Slovakia	2014–15 Slovak Cup	FK AS Trenčín	1st	—
Slovakia	2015 Slovak Super Cup	Not Held		
Slovenia	2014-15 Slovenian Cup	Koper	3rd	2006–07
Slovenia	2015 Slovenian Supercup	Koper	2nd	2010
Spain	2014–15 Copa del Rey	FC Barcelona	27th	2011–12
Spain	2015 Supercopa de España	Athletic Bilbao	2nd	1984
Sweden	2014–15 Svenska Cupen	IFK Göteborg	7th	2012–13
Sweden	2015 Svenska Supercupen	IFK Norrköping	1st	—
Switzerland	2014–15 Swiss Cup	FC Sion	13th	2010–11
Turkey	2014–15 Turkish Cup	Galatasaray	16th	2014
Turkey	2015 Turkish Super Cup	Galatasaray	14th	2013
Ukraine	2014–15 Ukrainian Cup	Dynamo Kyiv	11th	2013–14
Ukraine	2015 Ukrainian Super Cup	FC Shakhtar Donetsk	7th	2014
Wales	2014–15 Welsh Cup	The New Saints	5th	2013/14
Wales	2014–15 Welsh League Cup	The New Saints	6th	2010–11

==== Women ====
Nation	Tournament	Champion	Title	Last honor
Denmark	2014–15 Women's DBU Pokalen	Brøndby IF	9th	2013–14
England	2014–15 FA Women's Cup	Chelsea	1st	—
Germany	2014–15 Frauen DFB-Pokal	VfL Wolfsburg	2nd	2012–13
Israel	2014–15 Israeli Women's Cup	Maccabi Kishronot Hadera	1st	—
Slovenia	2014–15 Slovenian Women's Cup	Rudar Škale	3	2001–02
Spain	2015 Copa de la Reina	Sporting Huelva	1st	—
Sweden	2014–15 Svenska Cupen	Linköpings FC	5th	2013–14
Switzerland	2014–15 Swiss Women's Cup	FC Zürich Frauen	10th	2012–13

=== AFC nations ===
Nation	Tournament	Champion	Title	Last honor
Australia	2015 FFA Cup	Melbourne Victory	1st	—
Bahrain	2015 Bahraini King's Cup	Hidd SCC	1st	—
Bahrain	2015 Bahraini FA Cup	Hidd SCC	1st	—
Bahrain	2015 Bahraini Super Cup	Hidd SCC	1st	—
Jordan	2014–15 Jordan FA Cup	Al-Faisaly	18th	2012
Jordan	2015 Jordan Super Cup	Al-Faisaly	15th	2012
Kuwait	2014–15 Kuwait Emir Cup	Al Qadisiya Kuwait	16th	2013
Kuwait	2014–15 Kuwait Crown Prince Cup	Al-Arabi SC	7th	2012
Kuwait	2014–15 Kuwait Federation Cup	Kuwait SC	5th	2011–12
Kuwait	2015 Kuwait Super Cup	Kuwait SC	2nd	2010
Lebanon	2014–15 Lebanese FA Cup	Tripoli	2nd	2003
Lebanon	2014–15 Lebanese Elite Cup	Al Ahed	4th	2013
Lebanon	2015 Lebanese Super Cup	Al Ahed	4th	2011
Oman	2014–15 Sultan Qaboos Cup	Al-Oruba	4th	2010
Oman	2014–15 Oman Professional League Cup	Fanja	1st	—
Oman	2015 Oman Super Cup	Fanja	2nd	2012
Palestine	2015 Palestine Cup	Ahli Al-Khalil	1st	—
Palestine	2014–15 West Bank Palestine Cup	Ahli Al-Khalil	1st	—
Palestine	2014–15 West Bank Yasser Arafat Cup	Hilal Al-Quds	1st	—
Palestine	2015 West Bank Palestine Super Cup	Ahli Al-Khalil	1st	—
Palestine	2014–15 Gaza Strip Palestine Cup	Al-Ittihad Shejaia	2nd	1998–99
Palestine	2015 Gaza Strip Palestine Super Cup	Al-Ittihad Shejaia	2nd	2000
Qatar	2015 Emir of Qatar Cup	Al Sadd	15th	2014
Qatar	2015 Qatar Cup	Lekhwiya SC	2nd	2013
Saudi Arabia	2015 The Custodian of The Two Holy Mosques Cup	Al-Hilal	7th	1989
Saudi Arabia	2014–15 Saudi Crown Prince Cup	Al-Ahli SC (Jeddah)	6th	2006/07
Saudi Arabia	2015 Saudi Super Cup	Al-Hilal	1st	—
Syria	2014–15 Syrian Cup	Al-Wahda	5th	2013
United Arab Emirates	2014–15 UAE President's Cup	Al-Nasr Dubai SC	4th	1988–89
United Arab Emirates	2014–15 UAE League Cup	Al-Nasr Dubai SC	1st	—
United Arab Emirates	2014–15 UAE FA Cup	Dubai CSC	1st	—
United Arab Emirates	2015 The UAE Super Cup	Al Ain	5th	2012
Yemen	2014–15 Yemeni President Cup	Not played		
Yemen	2015 Yemeni Super Cup	Not played		
Iran	2014–15 Hazfi Cup	Zob Ahan	3rd	2008–09
Kyrgyzstan	2015 Kyrgyzstan Cup	FC Abdysh-Ata Kant	4th	2011
Kyrgyzstan	2015 Kyrgyzstan Super Cup			
Tajikistan	2015 Tajik Cup	FC Istiklol	5th	2014
Turkmenistan	2015 Turkmenistan Cup	Altyn Asyr FK	2nd	2009
Turkmenistan	2015 Turkmenistan Super Cup	Altyn Asyr FK	1st	—
Uzbekistan	2015 Uzbekistan Cup	FC Nasaf	1st	—
Uzbekistan	2015 PFL CUP	FC Shurtan Guzar	1st	—
Uzbekistan	2015 Uzbekistan Super Cup	Lokomotiv Tashkent	2nd	2014
Bangladesh	2015 Bangladesh Federation Cup	Sheikh Jamal Dhanmondi Club	3rd	2013–14
India	2014–15 Federation Cup	Bengaluru FC	1st	—
India	2015 Durand Cup	Not Held		
India	2015 IFA Shield	United Sports Club U-19	2nd	2013
the Maldives	2015 Maldives FA Cup	Not Held		
the Maldives	2015 President's Cup (Maldives)	Maziya S&RC	1st	—
the Maldives	2015 POMIS Cup	(Malaysia) PDRM FA	1st	—
the Maldives	2015 Maldivian FA Charity Shield	Maziya S&RC	1st	—
Nepal	2015 Ncell Cup	Not Held		
Nepal	2015 Aaha! Rara Gold Cup	Three Star Club	4th	2013
Nepal	2015 Budha Subba Gold Cup	APF Club	1st	—
Nepal	2015 Birat Gold Cup	Jhapa XI	1st	—
Nepal	2015 Simara Gold Cup	Nepal Army Club	1st	—
Pakistan	2015 Pakistan National Football Challenge Cup	KRL F.C.	5th	2012
Sri Lanka	2014–15 Sri Lanka FA Cup	Colombo FC	1st	—
China	2015 Chinese FA Cup	Jiangsu Guoxin-Sainty F.C.	1st	—
China	2015 Chinese FA Super Cup	Shandong Luneng	1st	—
Guam	2015 Guam FA Cup	Guam Shipyard	3rd	2012
Hong Kong	2014–15 Hong Kong Senior Challenge Shield	Eastern	8th	2007–08
Hong Kong	2014–15 Hong Kong FA Cup	Kitchee	3rd	2012–13
Hong Kong	2014–15 Hong Kong League Cup	Kitchee	4th	2011–12
Hong Kong	2014–15 Hong Kong season play-off	South China	2nd	2013–14
Japan	2015 Emperor's Cup	Gamba Osaka	5th	2014
Japan	2015 J. League Cup	Kashima Antlers	6th	2012
Japan	2015 Japanese Super Cup	Gamba Osaka	2nd	2007
South Korea	2015 Korean FA Cup	FC Seoul	2nd	1998
North Korea	2015 Mangyongdae Prize Sports Games	April 25 Sports Club	4th	2014
Macau	2015 Taça de Macau em Futebol	Windsor Arch Ka I	3rd	2010
Mongolia	2015 Mongolia Cup	Erchim FC	8th	2012
Brunei	2014/15 Brunei FA Cup	MS ABDB	5th	2011/12
Brunei	2015 Brunei Super Cup	Indera	1st	—
Cambodia	2015 Hun Sen Cup	Svay Rieng	2nd	2011
Indonesia	2015 Piala President	Persib Bandung	1st	—
Indonesia	2014–15 Indonesian Inter Island Cup	Arema Cronus	1st	—
Laos	2015 Prime Minister's Cup	Not Held		
Laos	2015 Lao FF Cup			
Malaysia	2015 Malaysia Cup	Selangor FA	33rd	2005
Malaysia	2015 Malaysia FA Cup	(Singapore) LionsXII	1st	—
Malaysia	2015 Sultan Haji Ahmad Shah Cup	Johor Darul Takzim FC	2nd	1986
Myanmar	2015 General Aung San Shield	Ayeyawady United F.C.	3rd	2014
the Philippines	2014–15 PFF National Men's Club Championship	Loyola	1st	—
the Philippines	2015 UFL Cup	Kaya F.C.	1st	—
the Philippines	2015 UFL FA Cup	Not Held		
the Philippines	2015 UFL FA League Cup	Not Held		
Singapore	2015 Singapore Cup	Albirex Niigata Singapore FC	1st	—
Singapore	2015 Singapore League Cup	Albirex Niigata Singapore FC	2nd	2011
Singapore	2015 Singapore Charity Shield	Warriors FC	3rd	2010
Thailand	2015 Thai FA Cup	Buriram United	4th	2013
Thailand	2015 Thai League Cup	Buriram United	4th	2013
Thailand	2015 Kor Royal Cup	Buriram United	3rd	2014
Vietnam	2015 Vietnamese National Cup	Becamex Binh Duong F.C.	2nd	1994
Vietnam	2015 Vietnamese Super Cup	Becamex Binh Duong F.C.	4th	2014

=== CONCACAF nations ===
Nation	Tournament	Champion	Title	Last honor
Canada	2015 Canadian Championship	Vancouver Whitecaps FC	1st	—
Canada	2015 Inter-Provincial Cup	Oakville Blue Devils	1st	—
Canada	2015 Canadian Challenge Trophy	London Marconi SC	2nd	2014
Aruba	2014–15 Torneo Copa Betico Croes	SV Britannia	6th	2012/13
Barbados	2014–15 Barbados FA Cup	Barbados Defence Force SC	3rd	2012
Bermuda	2014-15 Bermuda FA Cup			
Cayman Islands	2014–15 Cayman Islands FA Cup	Cayman Athletic SC	1st	N/A
French Guiana	2014–15 Coupe de Guyane	US Matoury	5th	2012/13
Guadeloupe	2015 Coupe de Guadeloupe	L'Etoile de Morne-à-l'Eau	6th	2002
Guyana	2014–15 Kashif & Shanghai Knockout Tournament	Slingerz FC	1st	N/A
Guyana	2015 Guyana Mayors Cup	Slingerz FC	1st	N/A
Martinique	2015 Coupe de la Martinique	Club Franciscain	15th	2012
Saint Kitts and Nevis	Saint Kitts and Nevis National Cup 2014-15	Conaree United FC	2nd	2012/13
Suriname	2015 Surinamese Cup	Nishan 42	1st	N/A
Suriname	2015 Suriname President's Cup (SuperCup)	Nishan 42	1st	N/A
Jamaica	2014–15 JFF Champions Cup			
Costa Rica	2015 Costa Rican Cup	C.S. Cartaginés	2nd	2014
El Salvador	2014–15 Copa EDESSA Independencia	Águila	1st	N/A
Honduras	2015 Honduran Cup	Olimpia	3rd	1998
Honduras	2015 Honduran Supercup			
Trinidad and Tobago	2015 Trinidad and Tobago Cup	North East Stars	2nd	2003
Trinidad and Tobago	2015 Trinidad and Tobago League Cup	W Connection F.C.	7th	2008
Trinidad and Tobago	2015 Trinidad and Tobago Pro Bowl	Central FC	1st	N/A
Trinidad and Tobago	2015 Trinidad and Tobago Classic			
Trinidad and Tobago	2015 Trinidad and Tobago Goal Shield			
Trinidad and Tobago	2015 Trinidad and Tobago Charity Shield	Central FC	1st	N/A
Mexico	Clausura 2015 Copa MX	Puebla	5th	1989–90
Mexico	Apertura 2015 Copa MX	C.D. Guadalajara	3rd	1970
Mexico	2015 Supercopa MX	Puebla F.C.	1st	—
Mexico	2015 Campeón de Campeones	Santos Laguna	1st	—
United States	2015 Lamar Hunt U.S. Open Cup	Sporting Kansas City	3rd	2012

=== CONMEBOL nations ===
Nation	Tournament	Champion	Title	Last honor
Argentina	2014–15 Copa Argentina	Boca Juniors	3rd	2011–12
Argentina	2015 Supercopa Argentina	San Lorenzo de Almagro	1st	—
Brazil	2015 Copa do Brasil	SE Palmeiras	3rd	2012
Brazil	2015 Copa do Nordeste	Ceará	1st	—
Brazil	2015 Copa Verde	Cuiabá	1st	—
Chile	2014–15 Copa Chile	Universidad de Concepción	2nd	2008
Chile	2015 Copa Chile	Club Universidad de Chile	5th	2012–13
Colombia	2015 Copa Colombia	Junior	1st	—
Colombia	2015 Superliga Colombiana	Santa Fe	2nd	2013
Venezuela	2015 Copa Venezuela	La Guaira	2nd	2014
Peru	2015 Torneo del Inca	Universidad César Vallejo	1st	—

=== CAF nations ===
Nation	Tournament	Champion	Title	Last honor
Algeria	2014–15 Algerian Cup	MO Béjaïa	1st	—
Algeria	2015 Algerian Super Cup	ES Sétif	1st	—
Egypt	2014–15 Egypt Cup	Zamalek SC	24th	2013–14
Egypt	2015 Egyptian Super Cup	Al Ahly SC	9th	2014
Morocco	2014–15 Coupe du Trône	Olympique Khouribga	2nd	2006
Tunisia	2014–15 Tunisian Cup	Étoile Sportive du Sahel	10th	2014
Benin	2015 Benin Cup			
Burkina Faso	2015 Coupe du Faso	USFA	4th	2010
(The Gambia) Gambia	2015 Gambian Cup	Wallidan	17th	2008
Ghana	2015 Ghanaian FA Cup	Medeama SC	2nd	2013
Guinea	2015 Guinée Coupe Nationale	AS Kaloum Star	7th	2007
Guinea-Bissau	2015 Taça Nacional da Guiné Bissau	Sport Bissau e Benfica	7th	2010
Ivory Coast	2015 Coupe de Côte d'Ivoire de football	Africa Sports d'Abidjan	16th	2009
Ivory Coast	2015 Coupe Houphouët-Boigny	Africa Sports d'Abidjan	11th	2003
Liberia	2015 Liberian Cup	Barrack Young Controllers FC II (reserve side)	5th	2013
Liberia	2015 Liberian National County Meet			
Liberia	2015 Liberian Super Cup	BYC	3rd	2013
Mali	2015 Malian Cup	Stade Malien	18th	2013
Mali	2015 Super Coupe National du Mali	Stade Malien	10th	2014
Mauritania	2015 Coupe du Président de la République	ACS Ksar	5th	2014
Mauritania	2015 Mauritanian Super Cup	FC Tevragh-Zeina	2nd	2010
Niger	2015 Niger Cup	AS SONIDEP	1st	—
Nigeria	2015 Nigerian FA Cup	Akwa United F.C.	1st	—
Nigeria	2015 Nigerian Super Cup			
Senegal	2015 Senegal FA Cup	L'Académie Génération Foot	1st	—
Sierra Leone	2015 Sierra Leonean FA Cup			
Cameroon	2015 Cameroonian Cup	UMS de Loum	1st	—
Chad	2015 Chad Cup			
Chad	2015 Coupe de Ligue de N'Djaména			
(Republic of the Congo) Congo	2015 Coupe du Congo de football	CSM Diables Noirs	7th	2014
(Democratic Republic of the Congo) DR Congo	2015 Coupe du Congo	FC Saint Eloi Lupopo	3rd	1968
Equatorial Guinea	2015 Equatoguinean Cup	Deportivo Mongomo	1st	—
Gabon	2015 Coupe du Gabon Interclubs	CF Mounana	2nd	2013
São Tomé and Príncipe	2015 Taça Nacional de São Tomé e Príncipe	Sporting Praia Cruz	6th	2000
Burundi	2015 Burundian Cup	Vital'O FC	13th	1999
Djibouti	2015 Djibouti Cup	Guelleh Batal	3rd	2012
Eritrea	2015 Eritrean Cup			
Ethiopia	2015 Ethiopian Cup	Defence Force SC	13th	2013
Kenya	2015 FKF President's Cup	Bandari F.C.	1st	—
Kenya	2015 KPL Top 8 Cup	Gor Mahia	2nd	2012
Kenya	2015 Kenyan Super Cup	Gor Mahia	3rd	2013
Rwanda	2015 Rwandan Cup	Police F.C. (Rwanda)	1st	—
Somalia	2015 Somalia Cup	Horseed FC	4th	1987
South Sudan	2015 South Sudan National Cup	Atlabara FC	1st	—
Sudan	2015 Sudan Cup	Al-Merrikh SC	24th	2014
Uganda	2014-15 Ugandan Cup	SC Villa	9th	2008–09
Tanzania	2015 Nyerere Cup			
Angola	2015 Taça de Angola	F.C. Bravos do Maquis	1st	—
Angola	2015 Supertaça de Angola	Recreativo do Libolo	1st	—
Botswana	2015 FA Challenge Cup			
Botswana	2015 Orange Kabelano Charity Cup			
Botswana	2014–15 Mascom Top 8 Cup	Gaborone United	2nd	2012/13
Comoros	2015 Comoros Cup	Fomboni FC	1st	—
Lesotho	2015 Lesotho Independence Cup	Bantu FC	7th	2013
Madagascar	2015 Coupe de Madagascar	CNaPS Sport	2nd	2011
Malawi	2015 Malawi FAM Cup	Mighty Wanderers F.C.	2nd	2005
Mauritius	2015 Mauritian Cup	Petite Rivière Noire SC	3rd	2014
Mozambique	2015 Taça de Moçambique	Liga Muçulmana de Maputo	2nd	2012
Namibia	2015 NFA Cup	United Africa Tigers	3rd	1996
Seychelles	2015 Seychelles FA Cup	Light Stars FC	1st	—
South Africa	2014–15 Nedbank Cup	Mamelodi Sundowns	4th	2008
South Africa	2015 Telkom Knockout	Mamelodi Sundowns	3rd	1999
South Africa	2015 MTN 8	Ajax Cape Town F.C.	1st	—
South Africa	2015 Carling Black Label Cup	Orlando Pirates	4th	2014
(Eswatini) Swaziland	2015 Swazi Cup	Moneni Pirates FC	2nd	1989
Zimbabwe	2015 Cup of Zimbabwe	Harare City F.C.	1st	—
Zimbabwe	2015 Zimbabwean Independence Trophy	Dynamos F.C.	5th	2013
Réunion	2015 Coupe de la Réunion	AS Excelsior	4th	2014

=== OFC nations ===
Nation	Tournament	Champion	Title	Last honor
New Zealand	2015 ASB Chatham Cup	Eastern Suburbs AFC	6th	1969
New Zealand	2015 ASB Charity Cup	Auckland City FC	3rd	2013
Vanuatu	2015 Port Vila Shield	Amicale FC	1st	—
Samoa	2015 Samoa Cup			
(French Polynesia) Tahiti	2015 Tahiti Cup	AS Pirae	7th	2002
Cook Islands	2015 Cook Islands Cup	Tupapa Maraerenga F.C.	8th	2013
Fiji	2015 Fiji Football Association Cup	Nadi F.C.	3rd	2013
Fiji	2015 Battle of the Giants	Rewa F.C.	7th	2014
New Caledonia	2015 New Caledonia Cup	Hienghène Sport	2nd	2013
Tuvalu	2015 NBT Cup			
Tuvalu	2015 Tuvalu Independence Cup	F.C. Tofaga	6th	2013
Tuvalu	2015 Christmas Cup			

== Second, third, fourth, and fifth leagues ==
=== CONCACAF nations ===
Nation	League	Champion	Final score	Second place	Title	Last honour
Canada	2015 Première Ligue de soccer du Québec	CS Mont-Royal Outremont		Lakeshore SC	2nd	2013
Canada	2015 Canadian Soccer League	Toronto Croatia	1–0	SC Waterloo Region	6th	2012

== 2015 Association football results ==
=== UEFA ===
- 15 June 2014 – 4 July 2015: 2015 UEFA Regions' Cup (final in Tallaght Stadium at (Republic of Ireland) Dublin)
  - The (Republic of Ireland) Irish Eastern Region defeated (Croatia) Zagreb, 1–0, in the final.
- 9 August 2014 – 14 May 2015: 2014–15 UEFA Women's Champions League (final takes place at the Friedrich-Ludwig-Jahn-Sportpark in (Germany) Berlin)
  - (Germany) Frankfurt defeated (France) Paris Saint-Germain 2–1 to win their fourth UEFA Women's Champions League title.
- 16 September 2014 – 13 April 2015: 2014–15 UEFA Youth League (final takes place at the Centre sportif de Colovray Nyon in (Switzerland) Nyon)
  - (England) Chelsea defeated (Ukraine) Shakhtar Donetsk, 3–2, to win their first UEFA Youth League title.
- 16 September 2014 – 6 June 2015: 2014–15 UEFA Champions League (final takes place at the Olympiastadion in (Germany) Berlin)
  - (Spain) Barcelona defeated (Italy) Juventus, 3–1, to win their fifth UEFA Champions League title. Barcelona will represent UEFA at the 2015 FIFA Club World Cup.
- 18 September 2014 – 27 May 2015: 2014–15 UEFA Europa League (final takes place at the National Stadium in (Poland) Warsaw)
  - (Spain) Sevilla defeated (Ukraine) Dnipro Dnipropetrovsk, 3–2, to win their fourth UEFA Europa League title.
- 6–22 May: 2015 UEFA European Under-17 Championship in Bulgaria
  - France defeated Germany, 4–1, to win their second UEFA European Under-17 Championship title.
- 17–30 June: 2015 UEFA European Under-21 Championship in the Czech Republic
  - Sweden defeated Portugal, 4–3 in penalties and after a 0–0 tie in regular play, to win their first UEFA European Under-21 Championship title.
- 22 June – 4 July: 2015 UEFA Women's Under-17 Championship in Iceland
  - Spain defeated Switzerland, 5–2, to win their third UEFA Women's Under-17 Championship title.
- 6–19 July: 2015 UEFA European Under-19 Championship in Greece
  - Spain defeated Russia, 2–0, to win their tenth UEFA European Under-19 Championship title.
- 15–27 July: 2015 UEFA Women's Under-19 Championship in Israel
  - Sweden defeated Spain, 3–1, to win their third UEFA Women's Under-19 Championship title.
- 11 August: 2015 UEFA Super Cup at the Mikheil Meskhi Stadium in (Georgia (country)) Tbilisi
  - (Spain) Barcelona defeated fellow Spanish team, Sevilla, 5–4 in extra time, to win their fourth UEFA Super Cup title.

=== CONMEBOL ===
- 14 January – 7 February: 2015 South American Youth Football Championship in Uruguay
  - Winner: Argentina wins its fifth South American Youth Football Championship. (qualified directly to compete in the 2015 FIFA U-20 World Cup and the 2016 Summer Olympics)
  - Second: Colombia (qualified directly to compete in the 2015 FIFA U-20 World Cup, plus an Olympic play-off against a CONCACAF team.)
  - Third: Uruguay (qualified directly to compete in the 2015 FIFA U-20 World Cup and the 2015 Pan American Games.)
  - Fourth: Brazil (qualified to same identical events as Uruguay.)
  - Fifth: Peru (qualified to compete at the 2015 Pan American Games only.)
  - Sixth: Paraguay (qualified to same event with Peru.)
- 3 February – 5 August: 2015 Copa Libertadores
  - (Argentina) River Plate defeated (Mexico) UANL, 3–0 in aggregate, to win their third Copa Libertadores title. River Plate will represent CONMEBOL at the 2015 FIFA Club World Cup.
- 6 & 11 February: 2015 Recopa Sudamericana (first leg at the Estadio Monumental Antonio Vespucio Liberti; second leg at the Estadio Pedro Bidegain) Both stadia are in (Argentina) Buenos Aires.
  - (Argentina) River Plate defeated fellow Argentinian team, San Lorenzo, 2–0 on aggregate, to win their first Recopa Sudamericana title.
- 4–29 March: 2015 South American Under-17 Football Championship in Paraguay
  - Note: These four teams qualified to compete at the 2015 FIFA U-17 World Cup.
  - Winner: Brazil (11th South American Under-17 Football Championship title)
  - Second: Argentina
  - Third: Ecuador
  - Fourth: Paraguay
- 11 June – 4 July: 2015 Copa América in Chile
  - Chile defeated Argentina, 4–1 in penalties and after a 0–0 score in regular play, to win their first Copa América title. Peru took third place.
- 11 August: 2015 Suruga Bank Championship in (Japan) Suita, Osaka
  - (Argentina) River Plate defeated (Japan) Gamba Osaka, 3–0, to win their first Suruga Bank Championship title.
- 11 August – 9 December: 2015 Copa Sudamericana
  - (Colombia) Santa Fe defeated (Argentina) Huracán, 3–1 in penalties and after a 0–0 score in regular plays, to win their first Copa Sudamericana title.
- 28 October – 8 November: 2015 Copa Libertadores Femenina in (Colombia) Medellín
  - (Brazil) Ferroviária defeated (Chile) Colo-Colo, 3–1, to win their first Copa Libertadores Femenina title. (Argentina) UAI Urquiza took third place.
- 21 November – 6 December: 2015 South American Under-15 Football Championship in Colombia
  - Brazil defeated Uruguay, 5–4 in penalties and after a 0–0 score in regular play, to win their fourth South American Under-15 Football Championship title. Argentina took third place.

=== CAF ===
- 17 January – 8 February: 2015 Africa Cup of Nations in Equatorial Guinea (final at Estadio de Bata, Bata)
  - Note 1: As a result, for refusing to host this event, Morocco was disqualified from participating in it.
  - Note 2: Also, Morocco is disqualified from competing in both the 2017 and 2019 editions of the event by the CAF.
  - Note 3: However, on 2 April 2015, Morocco was reinstated, by appeal, to compete in the Africa Cup of Nations again by the Court of Arbitration for Sport.
    - The Ivory Coast defeated Ghana, 9–8 in penalties and after a 0–0 tie in regular play, to win their second Africa Cup of Nations title. The DR Congo took third place.
- 13 February – 8 November: 2015 CAF Champions League
  - (Democratic Republic of the Congo) TP Mazembe defeated (Algeria) USM Alger, 4–1 on aggregate, to win their fifth CAF Champions League title. TP Mazembe will represent the CAF at the 2015 FIFA Club World Cup.
- 13 February – 29 November: 2015 CAF Confederation Cup
  - (Tunisia) Étoile du Sahel defeated (South Africa) Orlando Pirates, 2–1 on aggregate, to win their second CAF Confederation Cup title.
- 15 February – 1 March: 2015 African U-17 Championship in Niger
  - Mali defeated South Africa, 2–0, to win their first African U-17 Championship title. Guinea took third place.
- 21 February: 2015 CAF Super Cup in the Stade Mustapha Tchaker in (Algeria) Blida
  - (Algeria) ES Sétif defeated (Egypt) Al Ahly, 6–5 in penalties and after a 1–1 tie in regular play, to win their first CAF Super Cup title.
- 8–22 March: 2015 African U-20 Championship in Senegal
  - Nigeria defeated Senegal, 1–0, to win their seventh African U-20 Championship title. Ghana took third place.
- 27 November 2015 – 27 March 2016: 2015–16 CAF U-17 Women's World Cup Qualifying Tournament
- 28 November – 12 December: 2015 U-23 Africa Cup of Nations in Senegal
  - Nigeria defeated Algeria, 2–1, to win their first U-23 Africa Cup of Nations title. South Africa took third place.

=== AFC ===
- 9–31 January: 2015 AFC Asian Cup in Australia (final at Stadium Australia in Sydney)
  - Australia defeated South Korea, 2–1 after extra time, to claim their first AFC Asian Cup title. The United Arab Emirates took third place.
- 4 February – 21 November: 2015 AFC Champions League
  - (China) Guangzhou Evergrande defeated (United Arab Emirates) Al-Ahli, 1–0 on aggregate, to win their second AFC Champions League title.
  - Guangzhou Evergrande will represent the AFC at the 2015 FIFA Club World Cup.
- 10 February – 31 October: 2015 AFC Cup
  - (Malaysia) Johor Darul Ta'zim defeated (Tajikistan) Istiklol, 1–0, to win their first AFC Cup title.
- 1–10 May: 2015 AFF Women's Championship in (Vietnam) Ho Chi Minh City
  - Thailand defeated Myanmar, 3–2, to win their second AFF Women's Championship title. Australia U20 took third place.
- 27 July – 9 August: 2015 AFF U-16 Youth Championship in (Cambodia) Phnom Penh
  - Thailand defeated Myanmar, 3–0, to win their 3rd title. Australia took third place.
- 1–8 August: 2015 EAFF Women's East Asian Cup in Wuhan
  - 1st place: North Korea (second consecutive EAFF Women's East Asian Cup title)
  - 2nd place: South Korea
  - 3rd place: Japan
  - 4th place: China
- 2–9 August: 2015 EAFF East Asian Cup in Wuhan
  - 1st place: South Korea (second EAFF East Asian Cup title)
  - 2nd place: China
  - 3rd place: North Korea
  - 4th place: Japan
- 9–18 August: 2015 SAFF U-16 Championship in Sylhet
  - Bangladesh defeated India, 4–2 in penalties and after a 1–1 score in regular play, to win their first SAFF U-16 Championship title.
- 19–30 August: 2015 AFC U-19 Women's Championship in China
  - Japan defeated North Korea, 4–2 in penalties and after a 0–0 score in regular play, to win their fourth AFC U-19 Women's Championship title. South Korea took third place.
- 4–15 November: 2015 AFC U-16 Women's Championship in China
  - North Korea defeated Japan, 1–0, to win their second AFC U-16 Women's Championship title. China took the bronze medal.

=== CONCACAF ===
- 5 August 2014 – 29 April 2015: 2014–15 CONCACAF Champions League
  - (Mexico) Club América defeated the (Canada) Montreal Impact, 5–3 in aggregate, to win their sixth CONCACAF Champions League title. Club América will represent the CONCACAF Confederation at the 2015 FIFA Club World Cup.
- 9–24 January: 2015 CONCACAF U-20 Championship in Jamaica
  - Mexico defeated Panama, 4–2 in penalties and after a 1–1 tie in regular play, to win its 13th CONCACAF U-20 Championship title. Honduras, the United States, and the two finalist teams qualify to compete in the 2015 FIFA U-20 World Cup.
- 27 February – 15 March: 2015 CONCACAF U-17 Championship in HON
  - Mexico defeated Honduras, 3–0, to win their 6th CONCACAF U-17 Championship title. Costa Rica, the United States, and the two team finalists all qualify to compete in the 2015 FIFA U-17 World Cup.
- 6 March – 25 October: 2015 Major League Soccer season
  - Eastern Conference (MLS) and Supporters' Shield winners: (United States) New York Red Bulls
  - Western Conference (MLS) winners: (United States) FC Dallas
  - 28 October – 6 December: 2015 MLS Cup Playoffs
    - The (Oregon) Portland Timbers defeated the (Ohio) Columbus Crew, 2–1, to win their first MLS Cup title.
- 7–26 July: 2015 CONCACAF Gold Cup in the United States and Canada
  - Mexico defeated Jamaica, 3–1, to win their seventh CONCACAF Gold Cup title. Panama took third place. Mexico advances to face the United States in a one-game playoff for CONCACAF's place in the 2017 FIFA Confederations Cup.
- 9–23 August: 2015 CONCACAF Boys' Under-15 Championship in the Cayman Islands and Jamaica
  - Event cancelled.
- 10 October: 2015 CONCACAF Cup in Pasadena, California
  - Mexico defeated United States, 3–2 at extra time.

=== OFC ===
- 7 October 2014 – 26 April 2015: 2014–15 OFC Champions League (final at National Stadium in (Fiji) Suva)
  - Auckland City defeated fellow New Zealand team, the Team Wellington, 4–3 in a penalty shoot-out and after a 1–1 tie in regular play, to win their seventh OFC Champions League (including five consecutive wins). Auckland City will represent the OFC at the 2015 FIFA Club World Cup.
- 13–26 January: 2015 OFC U-17 Championship in (American Samoa) Pago Pago
  - New Zealand defeated Tahiti, 5–4 in penalties and after a 1–1 score in regular play, to win their sixth (fifth consecutively) OFC U-17 Championship title. Vanuatu took third place.

=== Other football competitions ===
- 30 May – 20 June: 2015 FIFA U-20 World Cup in New Zealand (final at North Harbour Stadium in Auckland)
  - Serbia defeated Brazil, 2–1 at extra time, to win their second FIFA U-20 World Cup title. This includes the 1987 title, when Serbia was part of the former Yugoslavia.
  - Mali took third place.
- 6 June – 5 July: 2015 FIFA Women's World Cup in Canada (final at BC Place in Vancouver)
  - The United States defeated Japan, 5–2, to win their third FIFA Women's World Cup title. England took third place.
- 13–29 June: 2015 CPISRA Football 7-a-side World Championships at the St George's Park National Football Centre in (United Kingdom) Burton upon Trent, Staffordshire
  - Russia defeated Ukraine, 1–0, in the final. Brazil took third place.
- 7–16 August: 2015 CPISRA Football 7-a-side U19 World Championships in (United Kingdom) Nottingham
  - Russia defeated Brazil, 3–2, in the final. England took third place.
- 20–29 August: IBSA Blind Football European Championships 2015 in (United Kingdom) Hereford
  - Turkey defeated Russia, 1–0, in the final. Spain took third place.
- 30 August – 8 September: 2015 IBSA Blind Football Asian Championships in (Japan) Tokyo
  - Iran defeated China, 1–0 in penalty kicks, in the final. South Korea took the bronze medal.
- 16–25 October: 2015 IBSA Blind Football African Championships in Douala
  - Morocco defeated Cameroon, 2–0, in the final. Mali took the bronze medal.
- 17 October – 8 November: 2015 FIFA U-17 World Cup in Chile
  - Nigeria defeated Mali, 2–0, to win their fifth FIFA U-17 World Cup title. Belgium took third place.
- 10–20 December: 2015 FIFA Club World Cup in Japan
  - (Spain) Barcelona defeated (Argentina) River Plate, 3–0, to win their third FIFA Club World Cup title. (Japan) Sanfrecce Hiroshima took third place.

== Deaths ==
Date	Name	Nation	Born	Note	Ref.
9 January	Angelo Anquilletti	Italy	25 April 1943 (aged 71)	International footballer	
10 January	Bernard Malanda-Adje	Belgium	24 August 1994 (aged 20)	International footballer	
11 January	Jenő Buzánszky	Hungary	4 May 1925 (aged 89)	International footballer	
11 January	Fritz Pott	Germany	23 April 1939 (aged 75)	International footballer	
27 January	Wilfred Agbonavbare	Nigeria	5 October 1966 (aged 48)	International footballer	
28 January	Alberto Cardaccio	Uruguay	26 August 1949 (aged 65)	International footballer	
29 January	Walter Glechner	Austria	12 February 1939 (aged 75)	International footballer	
1 February	Udo Lattek	Germany	16 January 1935 (aged 80)	International footballer and coach	
2 February	Karl-Erik Palmér	Sweden	17 April 1919 (aged 95)	International footballer	
2 February	Henryk Szczepański	Poland	7 October 1933 (aged 81)	International footballer	
3 February	Ion Nunweiller	Romania	9 January 1936 (aged 79)	International footballer	
5 February	Henri Coppens	Belgium	29 April 1939 (aged 75)	International footballer and coach	
12 February	Jean Lechantre	France	13 February 1922 (aged 92)	International footballer and coach	
25 February	Marian Szeja	Poland	20 August 1941 (aged 73)	International footballer	
1 March	Wolfram Wuttke	Germany	17 November 1961 (aged 53)	International footballer	
2 March	Dave Mackay	Scotland	14 November 1934 (aged 80)	International footballer and coach	
8 March	Lars Larsson	Sweden	16 March 1962 (aged 52)	International footballer and coach	
15 March	Antonio Betancort	Spain	13 March 1937 (aged 78)	International footballer	
17 March	Harry Heijnen	Netherlands	17 October 1940 (aged 74)	International footballer	
18 March	Zhao Dayu	China	17 January 1961 (aged 54)	International footballer	
1 April	Nicolae Rainea	Romania	19 November 1933 (aged 81)	Referee	
2 April	Raúl Gorriti	Peru	10 October 1956 (aged 58)	International footballer	
4 April	Ramón Barreto	Uruguay	14 September 1939 (aged 75)	Referee	
4 April	Bill Ellerington	England	30 June 1923 (aged 91)	International footballer	
7 April	Richard Henyekane	South Africa	28 September 1983 (aged 31)	International footballer	
10 April	Ray Treacy	Republic of Ireland	18 June 1946 (aged 68)	International footballer	
16 April	Attaphol Buspakom	Thailand	1 October 1962 (aged 52)	International footballer and coach	
30 April	Gregory Mertens	Belgium	2 February 1991 (aged 24)	International footballer	
9 May	Đorđe Pavlić	Yugoslavia	28 August 1938 (aged 76)	International footballer	
16 July	Alcides Ghiggia	Uruguay	22 December 1926 (aged 88)	International footballer; scored the goal that won the 1950 FIFA World Cup	
9 August	Walter López	Honduras	1 September 1977 (aged 37)	International footballer	
23 August	Enrique Reneau	Honduras	9 April 1971 (aged 44)	International footballer	
17 September	Dettmar Cramer	Germany	4 April 1925 (aged 90)	Footballer and international coach	
28 September	Ignacio Zoco	Spain	31 July 1939 (aged 76)	International footballer	
5 October	Flavio Emoli	Italy	23 August 1934 (aged 81)	International footballer	
7 October	Dominique Dropsy	France	9 December 1951 (aged 63)	International footballer	
12 October	Sakit Aliyev	Azerbaijan	22 December 1965 (aged 49)	International footballer and coach	
10 December	Arnold Peralta	Honduras	29 March 1989 (aged 26)	International footballer	
19 December	Jimmy Hill	England	22 July 1928 (aged 87)	Footballer, coach, director, presenter, analyst and innovator (proposed three points for a win and other innovations to the game)	
