= Geography of association football =

Worldwide governing bodies of association football

The following article gives a list of association football confederations, sub-confederations and associations around the world. The sport's international governing body is FIFA, but those associations not affiliated with FIFA are also included in this article.

Most European, African, and Asian countries have two principal competitions: a more prestigious league which is typically a double round-robin tournament restricted to the elite clubs, and a cup which is a single-elimination tournament open to both the elite and lesser clubs.

In the Americas, leagues are often organised as either multi-stage tournaments or separate Apertura and Clausura stages.

== By continent ==
=== Affiliated with FIFA ===
There are currently 211 national associations which are members of FIFA. An additional 11 associations are full or associate members of a continental confederation, but not members of FIFA.

World map of FIFA's six continental governing bodies.

Continent	Governing body	Abbr.	No.	FIFA members	Main continental competition(s)	
Continent	Governing body	Abbr.	No.	FIFA members	Club competition(s)	National competition(s)
Africa	Confederation of African Football	CAF	56	54	Champions League	Africa Cup of Nations
Africa	Confederation of African Football	CAF	56	54	Confederation Cup	Africa Cup of Nations
Africa	Confederation of African Football	CAF	56	54	Super Cup	Africa Cup of Nations
Asia	Asian Football Confederation	AFC	47	46	Champions League Elite	Asian Cup
Asia	Asian Football Confederation	AFC	47	46	Champions League Two	Asian Cup
Asia	Asian Football Confederation	AFC	47	46	Challenge League	Asian Cup
Europe	Union of European Football Associations	UEFA	55	55	Champions League	European Championship
Europe	Union of European Football Associations	UEFA	55	55	Europa League	European Championship
Europe	Union of European Football Associations	UEFA	55	55	Conference League	Nations League
Europe	Union of European Football Associations	UEFA	55	55	Super Cup	Nations League
North, Central America and the Caribbean	Confederation of North, Central American and Caribbean Association Football	CONCACAF	41	35	Champions Cup	Gold Cup
North, Central America and the Caribbean	Confederation of North, Central American and Caribbean Association Football	CONCACAF	41	35	Champions Cup	Nations League
Oceania	Oceania Football Confederation	OFC	13	11	Champions League	Nations Cup
Oceania	Oceania Football Confederation	OFC	13	11	Professional League	Nations Cup
South America	Confederación Sudamericana de Fútbol	CONMEBOL	10	10	Copa Libertadores	Copa América
South America	Confederación Sudamericana de Fútbol	CONMEBOL	10	10	Copa Sudamericana	Copa América
South America	Confederación Sudamericana de Fútbol	CONMEBOL	10	10	Recopa Sudamericana	Copa América

=== Other governing bodies ===
Governing body	Full name	Member associations	Main international competition(s)
ConIFA	Confederation of Independent Football Associations	54	CONIFA World Football Cup
IGA	International Island Games Association	24	Island Games

== By subregion ==
=== Africa ===
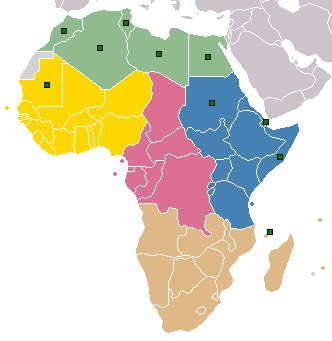
Map of the CAF's five subregional confederations. Out of 22 members, the transcontinental Union of Arab Football Associations (UAFA) hosts 10 CAF associations (green dots).

Subregion	Governing body	Abbr.	No.	Main international competition(s)	
Subregion	Governing body	Abbr.	No.	Club competition(s)	National competition(s)
Eastern Africa	Council for East and Central Africa Football Associations	CECAFA	12	CECAFA Club Cup	CECAFA Cup
Central Africa	Central African Football Federations' Union	UNIFFAC	8	—N/a	CEMAC Cup
Northern Africa	Union of North African Football	UNAF	5	UNAF Nessma Cup	—N/a
Southern Africa	Council of Southern Africa Football Associations	COSAFA	14	—N/a	COSAFA Senior Challenge Cup
Western Africa	West African Football Union	WAFU-UFOA	16	West African Club Championship	WAFU Nations Cup
Arab States	Union of Arab Football Associations	UAFA	10	Arab Club Champions Cup	FIFA Arab Cup

=== Asia ===
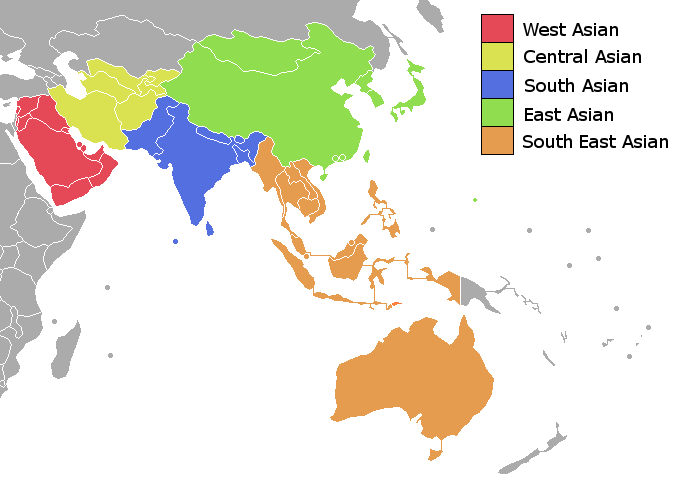
Map of the AFC's five subregional confederations. All 12 AFC associations of the West Asian Football Federation (WAFF) are also members of the transcontinental Union of Arab Football Associations (UAFA).

Subregion	Governing body	Abbr.	No.	Main international competition(s)	
Subregion	Governing body	Abbr.	No.	Club competition(s)	National competition(s)
Central Asia	Central Asian Football Association	CAFA	6	—N/a	CAFA Championship
Eastern Asia	East Asian Football Federation	EAFF	10	—N/a	EAFF E-1 Football Championship
South-eastern Asia	ASEAN Football Federation	AFF	12	ASEAN Club Championship; Mekong Club Championship for Mekong clubs AFF Futsal Club Championship for futsal.	ASEAN Football Championship
Southern Asia	South Asian Football Federation	SAFF	7	Sheikh Kamal International Club Cup, SAFF Club Cup	SAFF Championship
Western Asia	West Asian Football Federation	WAFF	12	—N/a	WAFF Championship
Arab States	Union of Arab Football Associations	UAFA	12	Arab Club Champions Cup	FIFA Arab Cup

=== North, Central America and the Caribbean ===
Subregion	Governing body	Abbr.	No.	International club competition(s)
Caribbean	Caribbean Football Union	CFU	31	CONCACAF Caribbean Cup
Caribbean	Caribbean Football Union	CFU	31	CFU Club Shield
Central America	Central American Football Union	UNCAF	7	CONCACAF Central American Cup
Northern America	North American Football Union	NAFU	3	Leagues Cup
Northern America	North American Football Union	NAFU	3	Campeones Cup

== By country ==
The football associations listed in this section are members of FIFA-affiliated confederations. They are listed by their official names registered with FIFA.

=== Africa ===
Country	Sub-Confederation	Code	FIFA	National association	Top division	Domestic cup	Super cup
Algeria	UNAF	ALG	Yes	Algerian Football Federation	Ligue Professionnelle 1	Algerian Cup	Algerian Super Cup
Angola	COSAFA	ANG	Yes	Angolan Football Federation	Girabola	Taça de Angola	SuperTaça
Benin	WAFU-UFOA	BEN	Yes	Benin Football Federation	Premier League	Benin Cup	none
Botswana	COSAFA	BOT	Yes	Botswana Football Association	Premier League	FA Challenge Cup	none
Burkina Faso	WAFU-UFOA	BFA	Yes	Burkinabé Football Federation	Premier League	Coupe du Faso	SuperCup
Burundi	CECAFA	BDI	Yes	Football Federation of Burundi	Premier League	Burundian Cup	Burundian Super Cup
Cameroon	UNIFFAC	CMR	Yes	Cameroonian Football Federation	Elite One	Cameroon Cup	Super Coupe Roger Milla
Cape Verde	WAFU-UFOA	CPV	Yes	Cape Verdean Football Federation	Campeonato Nacional	none	
Central African Republic	UNIFFAC	CTA	Yes	Central African Football Federation	C.A.R. League	Coupe Nationale	none
Chad	UNIFFAC	CHA	Yes	Chadian Football Federation	Premier League	Chad Cup	none
Comoros	COSAFA	COM	Yes	Comoros Football Federation	Premier League	Comoros Cup	none
(Democratic Republic of the Congo) Congo, Democratic Republic of	UNIFFAC	COD	Yes	Congolese Association Football Federation	Linafoot	Coupe du Congo	none
(Republic of the Congo) Congo, Republic of	UNIFFAC	CGO	Yes	Congolese Football Federation	Premier League	Coupe du Congo	none
Djibouti	CECAFA	DJI	Yes	Djiboutian Football Federation	Premier League	Djibouti Cup	none
Egypt	UNAF	EGY	Yes	Egyptian Football Association	Premier League	Egypt Cup	Super Cup
Equatorial Guinea	UNIFFAC	EQG	Yes	Equatoguinean Football Federation	Premier League	Equatoguinean Cup	none
Eritrea	CECAFA	ERI	Yes	Eritrean National Football Federation	Premier League	none	
Eswatini	COSAFA	SWZ	Yes	Eswatini Football Association	Premier League	Swazi Cup	Charity Cup
Ethiopia	CECAFA	ETH	Yes	Ethiopian Football Federation	Premier League	Ethiopian Cup	Super Cup
Gabon	UNIFFAC	GAB	Yes	Gabonese Football Federation	Championnat National D1	Coupe du Gabon Interclubs	none
(The Gambia) Gambia	WAFU-UFOA	GAM	Yes	Gambia Football Federation	GFA League First Division	Gambian Cup	none
Ghana	WAFU-UFOA	GHA	Yes	Ghana Football Association	Premier League	Ghanaian FA Cup	none
Guinea	WAFU-UFOA	GUI	Yes	Guinean Football Federation	Championnat National	Coupe Nationale	none
Guinea-Bissau	WAFU-UFOA	GNB	Yes	Football Federation of Guinea-Bissau	Campeonato Nacional	Taça Nacional	none
Ivory Coast (Côte d'Ivoire)	WAFU-UFOA	CIV	Yes	Ivorian Football Federation	Ligue 1	Coupe de Côte d'Ivoire	Coupe Houphouët-Boigny
Kenya	CECAFA	KEN	Yes	Football Kenya Federation	Premier League	President's Cup	Super Cup
Lesotho	COSAFA	LES	Yes	Lesotho Football Association	Premier League	Independence Cup	none
Liberia	WAFU-UFOA	LBR	Yes	Liberia Football Association	Premier League	Liberian Cup	none
Libya	UNAF	LBY	Yes	Libyan Football Federation	Premier League	Libyan Cup	SuperCup
Madagascar	COSAFA	MAD	Yes	Malagasy Football Federation	THB Champions League	Coupe de Madagascar	Super Coupe
Malawi	COSAFA	MWI	Yes	Football Association of Malawi	Premier Division	FAM Cup	none
Mali	WAFU-UFOA	MLI	Yes	Malian Football Federation	Première Division	Malian Cup	none
Mauritania	WAFU-UFOA	MTN	Yes	Football Federation of the Islamic Republic of Mauritania	Ligue 1	Coupe du Président	none
Mauritius	COSAFA	MRI	Yes	Mauritius Football Association	Mauritian League	Mauritian Cup	none
Morocco	UNAF	MAR	Yes	Royal Moroccan Football Federation	Botola	Coupe du Trône	none
Mozambique	COSAFA	MOZ	Yes	Mozambican Football Federation	Moçambola	Taça de Moçambique	none
Namibia	COSAFA	NAM	Yes	Namibia Football Association	Namibia Premiership	NFA Cup	none
Niger	WAFU-UFOA	NIG	Yes	Nigerien Football Federation	Championnat National	Coupe de Niger	none
Nigeria	WAFU-UFOA	NGA	Yes	Nigeria Football Federation	Premier League	Nigerian Cup	none
Réunion	None	REU	No	Réunionese Football League	Premier League	Coupe de la Réunion	none
Rwanda	CECAFA	RWA	Yes	Rwandese Association Football Federation	National Football League	Rwandan Cup	Rwandan Super Cup
São Tomé and Príncipe	UNIFFAC	STP	Yes	São Toméan Football Federation	Campeonato Santomense	Taça Nacional	none
Senegal	WAFU-UFOA	SEN	Yes	Senegalese Football Federation	Premier League	FA Cup	none
Seychelles	COSAFA	SEY	Yes	Seychelles Football Federation	First Division	FA Cup	none
Sierra Leone	WAFU-UFOA	SLE	Yes	Sierra Leone Football Association	National Premier League	FA Cup	none
Somalia	CECAFA	SOM	Yes	Somali Football Federation	Somali League	Somalia Cup	Somalia Super Cup
South Africa	COSAFA	RSA	Yes	South African Football Association	Premier Division	Nedbank Cup	none
South Sudan	CECAFA	SSD	Yes	South Sudan Football Association	Premier League	Championship	none
Sudan	CECAFA	SDN	Yes	Sudan Football Association	Premier League	Sudan Cup	none
Tanzania	CECAFA	TAN	Yes	Tanzania Football Federation	Premier League	Nyerere Cup	none
Togo	WAFU-UFOA	TOG	Yes	Togolese Football Federation	Championnat National	Coupe du Togo	none
Tunisia	UNAF	TUN	Yes	Tunisian Football Federation	Ligue Professionnelle 1	Tunisia Cup	Tunisian Super Cup
Uganda	CECAFA	UGA	Yes	Federation of Uganda Football Associations	Premier League	Ugandan Cup	none
Zambia	COSAFA	ZAM	Yes	Football Association of Zambia	FAZ Super Division	ABSA Cup	none
Zanzibar	CECAFA	ZAN	No	Zanzibar Football Association	Premier League	Zanzibari Cup	none
Zimbabwe	COSAFA	ZIM	Yes	Zimbabwe Football Association	Premier Soccer League	Cup of Zimbabwe	none

=== Asia ===
Country	Sub-Confederation	Code	FIFA	National association	Top division	Domestic cup	Super cup
Afghanistan	CAFA	AFG	Yes	Afghanistan Football Federation	Premier League	none	
Australia	AFF	AUS	Yes	Football Australia	A-League Men	Australia Cup	none
Bahrain	WAFF	BHR	Yes	Bahrain Football Association	Premier League	King's Cup	none
Bangladesh	SAFF	BAN	Yes	Bangladesh Football Federation	Premier League	Federation Cup	Super Cup
Bhutan	SAFF	BHU	Yes	Bhutan Football Federation	Premier League	none	
Brunei	AFF	BRU	Yes	Football Association of Brunei Darussalam	Super League	FA Cup	Super Cup
Cambodia	AFF	CAM	Yes	Football Federation of Cambodia	Cambodian League	Hun Sen Cup	none
China	EAFF	CHN	Yes	Chinese Football Association	Super League	FA Cup	FA Super Cup
Chinese Taipei (Taiwan)	EAFF	TPE	Yes	Chinese Taipei Football Association	Taiwan Football Premier League	none	
Guam	EAFF	GUM	Yes	Guam Football Association	Soccer League	FA Cup	none
Hong Kong	EAFF	HKG	Yes	Hong Kong Football Association	Premier League	Senior Shield and FA Cup	Community Cup (defunct)
India	SAFF	IND	Yes	All India Football Federation	Super League	Super Cup and Durand Cup	Indian Super Cup (defunct)
Indonesia	AFF	IDN	Yes	Football Association of Indonesia	Liga 1	Piala Indonesia	Community Shield
Iran	CAFA	IRN	Yes	Football Federation Islamic Republic of Iran	Persian Gulf Pro League	Hazfi Cup	Super Cup
Iraq	WAFF	IRQ	Yes	Iraq Football Association	Premier League	FA Cup	Super Cup
Japan	EAFF	JPN	Yes	Japan Football Association	J1 League	Emperor's Cup	Super Cup
Jordan	WAFF	JOR	Yes	Jordan Football Association	Premier League	FA Cup	Super Cup
Kuwait	WAFF	KUW	Yes	Kuwait Football Association	Premier League	Emir Cup	Super Cup
Kyrgyzstan	CAFA	KGZ	Yes	Football Federation of the Kyrgyz Republic	Kyrgyzstan League	Kyrgyzstan Cup	Super Cup
Laos	AFF	LAO	Yes	Lao Football Federation	Premier League	Prime Minister's Cup	none
Lebanon	WAFF	LBN	Yes	Lebanon Football Association	Premier League	FA Cup	Super Cup
Macau	EAFF	MAC	Yes	Macau Football Association	Liga de Elite	Taça de Macau	none
Malaysia	AFF	MAS	Yes	Football Association of Malaysia	Super League	FA Cup	Charity Cup
Maldives	SAFF	MDV	Yes	Football Association of Maldives	Dhivehi Premier League	FA Cup	FA Charity Shield
Mongolia	EAFF	MNG	Yes	Mongolian Football Federation	Niislel League	Mongolia Cup	Super Cup
Myanmar	AFF	MYA	Yes	Myanmar Football Federation	National League	MFF Cup	none
Nepal	SAFF	NEP	Yes	All Nepal Football Association	A-Division	Aaha! Gold Cup	none
North Korea	EAFF	PRK	Yes	DPR Korea Football Association	Premier League	Republican Championship	none
Northern Mariana Islands	EAFF	MNP	No	Northern Mariana Islands Football Association	M-League	Northern Mariana Cup	none
Oman	WAFF	OMA	Yes	Oman Football Association	Pro League	Sultan Qaboos Cup	Super Cup
Pakistan	SAFF	PAK	Yes	Pakistan Football Federation	Premier League	Challenge Cup	none
Palestine	WAFF	PLE	Yes	Palestinian Football Association	Gaza Strip League	Palestine Cup	none
Palestine	WAFF	PLE	Yes	Palestinian Football Association	West Bank Premier League	Palestine Cup	none
Philippines	AFF	PHI	Yes	Philippine Football Federation	Philippines Football League	Copa Paulino Alcantara	none
Qatar	WAFF	QAT	Yes	Qatar Football Association	Qatar Stars League	Emir of Qatar Cup	none
Saudi Arabia	WAFF	KSA	Yes	Saudi Arabian Football Federation	Pro League	King Cup	Super Cup
Singapore	AFF	SGP	Yes	Football Association of Singapore	S. League	Singapore Cup	Charity Shield
South Korea	EAFF	KOR	Yes	Korea Football Association	K League 1	FA Cup	Super Cup (defunct)
Sri Lanka	SAFF	SRI	Yes	Football Federation of Sri Lanka	Premier League	FA Cup	none
Syria	WAFF	SYR	Yes	Syrian Arab Federation for Football	Premier League	Syrian Cup	Super Cup
Tajikistan	CAFA	TJK	Yes	Tajikistan Football Federation	Tajik League	Tajik Cup	none
Thailand	AFF	THA	Yes	Football Association of Thailand	Thai League 1	FA Cup	Thailand Champions Cup
Timor-Leste	AFF	TLS	Yes	Football Federation of Timor-Leste	Liga Futebol Amadora Primeira Divisão	Taça 12 de Novembro	LFA Super Taça
Turkmenistan	CAFA	TKM	Yes	Football Federation of Turkmenistan	Ýokary Liga	Turkmenistan Cup	Super Cup
United Arab Emirates	WAFF	UAE	Yes	United Arab Emirates Football Association	Pro-League	President's Cup	Super Cup
Uzbekistan	CAFA	UZB	Yes	Uzbekistan Football Federation	Uzbek League	Uzbekistan Cup	Super Cup
Vietnam	AFF	VIE	Yes	Vietnam Football Federation	V.League 1	National Cup	Super Cup
Yemen	WAFF	YEM	Yes	Yemen Football Association	Yemeni League	President Cup	Super Cup

=== Europe ===
All UEFA associations are affiliated with FIFA.

Country	Code	National association	Top division	Domestic cup	Super cup
Albania	ALB	Albanian Football Association	Albanian Superliga	Albanian Cup	Albanian Supercup
Andorra	AND	Andorran Football Federation	Primera Divisió	Copa Constitució	Supercup
Armenia	ARM	Football Federation of Armenia	Premier League	Independence Cup	SuperCup
Austria	AUT	Austrian Football Association	Bundesliga	Austrian Cup	Supercup
Azerbaijan	AZE	Association of Football Federations of Azerbaijan	Azerbaijan Premier League	Azerbaijan Cup	Supercup
Belarus	BLR	Football Federation of Belarus	Belarusian Premier League	Belarusian Cup	Super Cup
Belgium	BEL	Royal Belgian Football Association	Belgian Pro League	Belgian Cup	Belgian Super Cup
Bosnia and Herzegovina	BIH	Football Association of Bosnia and Herzegovina	Premier League	Bosnia and Herzegovina Football Cup	Super Cup (defunct)
Bulgaria	BUL	Bulgarian Football Union	First Professional Football League	Bulgarian Cup	Supercup
Croatia	CRO	Croatian Football Federation	Prva HNL	Croatian Football Cup	Super Cup
Cyprus	CYP	Cyprus Football Association	First Division	Cypriot Cup	Super Cup
Czech Republic (Czechia)	CZE	Football Association of the Czech Republic	FORTUNA Liga	MOL Cup	Czech Supercup
Denmark	DEN	Danish Football Association	Superligaen	Danish Cup	Supercup (defunct)
England	ENG	The Football Association	Premier League	FA Cup	FA Community Shield
Estonia	EST	Estonian Football Association	Meistriliiga	Estonian Cup	Supercup
Faroe Islands	FRO	Faroe Islands Football Association	Betrideildin	Løgmanssteypið (Prime minister's cup)	Stórsteypið (The great cup)
Finland	FIN	Football Association of Finland	Veikkausliiga	Finnish Cup	none
France	FRA	French Football Federation	Ligue 1	Coupe de France	Trophée des Champions
(Georgia (country)) Georgia	GEO	Georgian Football Federation	Erovnuli Liga	Georgian Cup	Super Cup
Germany	GER	German Football Association	Bundesliga	DFB-Pokal	Franz Beckenbauer Supercup
Gibraltar	GIB	Gibraltar Football Association	Gibraltar Football League	Rock Cup	Pepe Reyes Cup
Greece	GRE	Hellenic Football Federation	Super League	Football Cup	Super Cup
Hungary	HUN	Hungarian Football Federation	Nemzeti Bajnokság I	Magyar Kupa	Szuperkupa
Iceland	ISL	Football Association of Iceland	Úrvalsdeild karla	Icelandic Cup	Super Cup
(Republic of Ireland) Ireland, Republic of	IRL	Football Association of Ireland	Premier Division	FAI Cup	President's Cup
Israel	ISR	Israel Football Association	Premier League	State Cup	Super Cup
Italy	ITA	Italian Football Federation	Serie A	Coppa Italia	Supercoppa Italiana
Kazakhstan	KAZ	Football Federation of Kazakhstan	Premier League	Kazakhstan Cup	Super Cup
Kosovo	KOS	Football Federation of Kosovo	Superleague	Kosovar Cup	Kosovar Supercup
Latvia	LVA	Latvian Football Federation	Higher League	Football Cup	Supercup
Liechtenstein	LIE	Liechtenstein Football Association	Swiss Super League	Football Cup	none
Lithuania	LTU	Lithuanian Football Federation	A Lyga	Football Cup	Supercup
Luxembourg	LUX	Luxembourg Football Federation	Division National	Luxembourg Cup	none
Malta	MLT	Malta Football Association	Premier League	FA Trophy	Super Cup
Moldova	MDA	Football Association of Moldova	National Division	Moldovan Cup	Super Cup
Montenegro	MNE	Football Association of Montenegro	1. CFL	Montenegrin Cup	none
Netherlands	NED	Royal Dutch Football Association	Eredivisie	KNVB Cup	Johan Cruyff Shield
North Macedonia	MKD	Football Federation of Macedonia	Macedonian First Football League	Macedonian Football Cup	Supercup
Northern Ireland	NIR	Irish Football Association	Premiership	Irish Cup	Charity Shield
Norway	NOR	Football Association of Norway	Eliteserien	Football Cup	Superfinalen (defunct)
Poland	POL	Polish Football Association	Ekstraklasa	Polish Cup	Polish Super Cup
Portugal	POR	Portuguese Football Federation	Primeira Liga	Taça de Portugal	Supertaça Cândido de Oliveira
Romania	ROU	Romanian Football Federation	Liga I	Cupa României	Supercupa României
~~(Russia)~~ Russia	RUS	Russian Football Union	Premier League	Russian Cup	Super Cup
San Marino	SMR	San Marino Football Federation	Campionato Sammarinese	Coppa Titano	Super Coppa
Scotland	SCO	Scottish Football Association	Premiership	Scottish Cup	none
Serbia	SRB	Football Association of Serbia	SuperLiga	Serbian Cup	none
Slovakia	SVK	Slovak Football Association	Super Liga	Slovak Cup	Super Cup
Slovenia	SVN	Football Association of Slovenia	1. SNL	Football Cup	Supercup
Spain	ESP	Royal Spanish Football Federation	La Liga	Copa del Rey	Supercopa de España
Sweden	SWE	Swedish Football Association	Allsvenskan	Svenska Cupen	Svenska Supercupen (defunct)
Switzerland	SUI	Swiss Football Association	Swiss Super League	Swiss Cup	Super Cup (defunct)
Turkey (Türkiye)	TUR	Turkish Football Federation	Süper Lig	Turkish Cup	Super Cup
Ukraine	UKR	Ukrainian Association of Football	Premier League	Ukrainian Cup	Super Cup
Wales	WAL	Football Association of Wales	Cymru Premier	Welsh Cup	none

=== North, Central America and the Caribbean ===
Country	Sub-Confederation	Code	FIFA	National association	Top division	Domestic cup	Super cup
Anguilla	CFU	AIA	Yes	Anguilla Football Association	Anguillian League	none	
Antigua and Barbuda	CFU	ATG	Yes	Antigua and Barbuda Football Association	Premier Division	FA Cup	none
Aruba	CFU	ARU	Yes	Aruba Football Federation	Division di Honor	Copa Betico Croes	none
(The Bahamas) Bahamas	CFU	BAH	Yes	Bahamas Football Association	Senior League	FA Cup	none
Barbados	CFU	BRB	Yes	Barbados Football Association	Premier Division	FA Cup	none
Belize	UNCAF	BLZ	Yes	Football Federation of Belize	Premier League	none	
Bermuda	CFU	BER	Yes	Bermuda Football Association	Premier Division	FA Cup	none
Bonaire	CFU	BES	No	Bonaire Football Federation	Bonaire League	none	
British Virgin Islands	CFU	VGB	Yes	British Virgin Islands Football Association	BVIFA Football League	none	
Canada	NAFU	CAN	Yes	Canadian Soccer Association	Canadian Premier League	Canadian Championship	none
Cayman Islands	CFU	CAY	Yes	Cayman Islands Football Association	Cayman Islands League	FA Cup	none
Costa Rica	UNCAF	CRC	Yes	Costa Rican Football Federation	Primera División	Costa Rican Cup	Supercopa
Cuba	CFU	CUB	Yes	Football Association of Cuba	Campeonato Nacional	none	
Curaçao	CFU	CUW	Yes	Curaçao Football Federation	Sekshon Pagá	none	
Dominica	CFU	DMA	Yes	Dominica Football Association	Dominica Championship	Dominica Knock-Out	none
Dominican Republic	CFU	DOM	Yes	Dominican Football Federation	Primera División	none	
El Salvador	UNCAF	SLV	Yes	Salvadoran Football Federation	Primera División	Copa Claro	none
French Guiana	CFU	GUF	No	Ligue de Football de la Guyane	Championnat National	Coupe de Guyane	none
Grenada	CFU	GRN	Yes	Grenada Football Association	Grenada League	none	
Guadeloupe	CFU	GLP	No	Guadeloupean League of Football	Division d'Honneur	Coupe de Guadeloupe	none
Guatemala	UNCAF	GUA	Yes	National Football Federation of Guatemala	Liga Bantrab	Copa de Guatemala	none
Guyana	CFU	GUY	Yes	Guyana Football Federation	Elite League	Mayors Cup	none
Haiti	CFU	HAI	Yes	Haitian Football Federation	Ligue Haïtienne	Coupe d'Haïti	none
Honduras	UNCAF	HON	Yes	Football Federation of Honduras	Liga Nacional	Honduran Cup (defunct)	Super Cup (defunct)
Jamaica	CFU	JAM	Yes	Jamaica Football Federation	National Premier League	JFF Champions Cup	none
Martinique	CFU	MTQ	No	Ligue de football de la Martinique	Championnat National	Coupe de la Martinique	none
Mexico	NAFU	MEX	Yes	Mexican Football Federation	Liga MX	Copa MX	Supercopa
Montserrat	CFU	MSR	Yes	Montserrat Football Association	Championship	none	
Nicaragua	UNCAF	NCA	Yes	Nicaraguan Football Federation	Liga Primera	Copa de Nicaragua	none
Panama	UNCAF	PAN	Yes	Panamanian Football Federation	Liga Panameña de Fútbol	none	
Puerto Rico	CFU	PUR	Yes	Puerto Rican Football Federation	Liga Puerto Rico	Copa de Puerto Rico	none
Saint Kitts and Nevis	CFU	SKN	Yes	St. Kitts and Nevis Football Association	Saint Kitts Premier Division	National Cup	none
Saint Kitts and Nevis	CFU	SKN	Yes	St. Kitts and Nevis Football Association	Nevis Premier Division	National Cup	none
Saint Lucia	CFU	LCA	Yes	Saint Lucia Football Association	Gold Division	FA Cup	none
Saint Martin	CFU	MAF	No	Football Committee of Saint Martin	Saint-Martin Senior League	Coupe de Noël	none
Saint Vincent and the Grenadines	CFU	VIN	Yes	Saint Vincent and the Grenadines Football Federation	NLA Premier League	none	
Sint Maarten	CFU	SXM	No	Sint Maarten Soccer Association	Sint Maarten League	none	
Suriname	CFU	SUR	Yes	Surinamese Football Association	Hoofdklasse	Surinamese Cup	President's Cup
Trinidad and Tobago	CFU	TRI	Yes	Trinidad and Tobago Football Federation	TT Pro League	FA Trophy	Charity Shield
Turks and Caicos Islands	CFU	TCA	Yes	Turks and Caicos Islands Football Association	Premier League	none	
United States	NAFU	USA	Yes	United States Soccer Federation	Major League Soccer	U.S. Open Cup	none
United States Virgin Islands	CFU	VIR	Yes	U.S. Virgin Islands Soccer Federation	U.S. Virgin Islands Premier League	none	

=== Oceania ===
Country	Code	FIFA	National association	Top division	Domestic cup	Super cup
American Samoa	ASA	Yes	Football Federation American Samoa	FFAS Senior League	FFAS President's Cup	none
Cook Islands	COK	Yes	Cook Islands Football Association	Cook Islands Round Cup	Cook Islands Cup	none
Fiji	FIJ	Yes	Fiji Football Association	Fiji Premier League	FF Cup	Champion vs Champion
French Polynesia (Tahiti)	TAH	Yes	Tahitian Football Federation	Ligue 1	Tahiti Cup	Coupe des Champions
Kiribati	KIR	No	Kiribati Islands Football Federation	Kiribati National Championship	none	
New Caledonia	NCL	Yes	New Caledonian Football Federation	Super Ligue	Coupe de Calédonie	none
New Zealand	NZL	Yes	New Zealand Football	National League	Chatham Cup	Charity Cup
Papua New Guinea	PNG	Yes	Papua New Guinea Football Association	National Soccer League	none	National Club Championship
Samoa	SAM	Yes	Football Federation Samoa	Samoa National League	Samoa Cup	none
Solomon Islands	SOL	Yes	Solomon Islands Football Federation	S-League	none	
Tonga	TGA	Yes	Tonga Football Association	Major League	Tonga Cup	none
Tuvalu	TUV	No	Tuvalu National Football Association	Tuvalu A-Division	NBT Cup	none
Vanuatu	VAN	Yes	Vanuatu Football Federation	Port Vila Football League	Vanuatu Cup	none

=== South America ===
All CONMEBOL associations are affiliated with FIFA.

Country	Code	National association	Top division	Domestic cup	Super cup
Argentina	ARG	Argentine Football Association	Primera División	Copa Argentina	Supercopa Argentina
Bolivia	BOL	Bolivian Football Federation	División Profesional	Copa Bolivia	Supercopa Bolivia
Brazil	BRA	Brazilian Football Confederation	Série A	Copa do Brasil	Supercopa do Brasil
Chile	CHI	Football Federation of Chile	Primera División	Copa Chile	Supercopa de Chile
Colombia	COL	Colombian Football Federation	Categoría Primera A	Copa Colombia	Superliga Colombiana
Ecuador	ECU	Ecuadorian Football Federation	Serie A	Copa Ecuador	Supercopa Ecuador
Paraguay	PAR	Paraguayan Football Association	Primera División	Copa Paraguay	Supercopa Paraguay
Peru	PER	Peruvian Football Federation	Primera División	Copa Bicentenario	Supercopa Peruana
Uruguay	URU	Uruguayan Football Association	Primera División	Copa Uruguay	Supercopa Uruguaya
Venezuela	VEN	Venezuelan Football Federation	Primera División	Copa Venezuela	Supercopa Venezuela

== Non-FIFA associations ==
The football associations in this section represent fully and partially recognized sovereign states, dependent territories, and stateless nations that are not members of FIFA or a FIFA confederation.

Several of these non-FIFA associations are included in the World Football Elo Ratings, which ranks all national association football teams from FIFA-affiliated confederations, in addition to some unaffiliated teams. Several of these associations are also members of the Confederation of Independent Football Associations and/or the International Island Games Association.

=== Africa ===
Territory	Country	National association	Elo Ratings	ConIFA	IGA
(Chagos Archipelago) Chagos Islands	United Kingdom	Chagos Football Association	Yes	Yes	No
Mayotte	France	Ligue de Football de Mayotte	Yes	No	No
Saint Helena	United Kingdom	Saint Helena Football Association	No	No	Yes
Somaliland	Somalia	Somaliland Football Association	Yes	Yes	No
Western Sahara	Morocco (primarily)	Sahrawi Football Federation	Yes	Yes	No

=== Asia ===
Territory	Country	National association	Elo Ratings	ConIFA	IGA
Christmas Island	Australia	Christmas Island Soccer Association	Yes	No	No
Cocos Islands	Australia	Cocos (Keeling) Islands Soccer Association	Yes	No	No
(Kurdistan Region) Kurdistan	Iraq	Kurdistan Football Association	Yes	Yes	No
Tibet	China	Tibetan National Football Association	Yes	Yes	No

=== Europe ===
Territory	Country	National association	Elo Ratings	ConIFA	IGA
Abkhazia	Georgia	Football Federation of Abkhazia	No	Yes	No
Åland Islands	Finland	Åland Football Association	No	No	Yes
(Republic of Artsakh) Artsakh	Azerbaijan	Artsakh Football Association	No	Yes	No
Guernsey	United Kingdom	Guernsey Football Association	No	No	Yes
Isle of Man	United Kingdom	Isle of Man Football Association	No	No	Yes
Jersey	United Kingdom	Jersey Football Association	No	Yes	Yes
Monaco		Monégasque Football Federation	Yes	Yes	No
Northern Cyprus	Cyprus	Cyprus Turkish Football Association	Yes	Yes	No
South Ossetia	Georgia	Football Federation of the Republic of South Ossetia	No	Yes	No
Transnistria	Moldova	Transnistria national football team	No	Yes	No
Vatican City		Vatican City national football team	Yes	No	No

- Akrotiri and Dhekelia and Svalbard do not have a Football Association.

=== North, Central America and the Caribbean ===
Territory	Country	National association	Elo Ratings	ConIFA	IGA
Greenland	Denmark	Football Association of Greenland	Yes	No	Yes
(Saba (island)) Saba	Netherlands	Federation of Saba	Yes	No	No
Saint Barthélemy	France	Saint Barthélemy Football Association	Yes	No	No
Saint Pierre and Miquelon	France	Football Federation of Saint Pierre and Miquelon	Yes	No	No
Sint Eustatius	Netherlands	Statia Football Association	Yes	No	No

=== Oceania ===
Territory	Country	National association	Elo Ratings	ConIFA	IGA
(Autonomous Region of Bougainville) Bougainville	Papua New Guinea	Football Federation of Bougainville	No	No	No
Marshall Islands		Marshall Islands Soccer Association	Yes	No	No
(Federated States of Micronesia) Micronesia		Federated States of Micronesia Football Association	Yes	No	No
Nauru		Nauru Soccer Federation	No	No	No
Niue	New Zealand	Niue Island Soccer Association	Yes	No	No
Norfolk Island	Australia	Norfolk Island Soccer Federation	No	No	No
Palau		Palau Football Association	Yes	No	No
Tokelau	New Zealand	Tokelau Amateur Soccer Association	No	No	No
Wallis and Futuna	France	Wallis and Futuna Soccer Federation	Yes	No	No

- Pitcairn Islands does not have a Football Association.

=== South America ===
Territory	Country	National association	Elo Ratings	ConIFA	IGA
Falkland Islands	United Kingdom	Falkland Islands Football League	Yes	No	Yes

=== Regional ===
Beneath the national level, governance of football may be divided up into regional or territorial associations. Other non-national associations represent stateless populations, diasporas or micronations. Details of these are listed at non-FIFA international football.

== See also ==
- List of women's national association football teams
- List of men's national association football teams
- Geography of women's association football
- List of association football competitions
- Domestic association football season
- Lists of association football clubs
- List of sports attendance figures
- List of FIFA country codes
