= AS GMIA =

Chadian football club

- Ground: Stade Omnisports Idriss Mahamat Ouya; N'Djamena, Chad
- Capacity: 30,000
- League: Chad Premier League

AS GMIA is a football (soccer) club from Chad based in N'Djamena.

The club currently plays in the Chad Premier League the top division of Chadian football.

== Stadium ==
Currently the team plays at the 30,000 capacity Stade Omnisports Idriss Mahamat Ouya.
