= Sakit Aliyev =

Azerbaijani footballer (1965–2015)

Personal information
- Full name: Sakit Aliyev
- Date of birth: 22 December 1965
- Place of birth: Tovuz, Azerbaijan SSR, USSR
- Date of death: 12 October 2015 (aged 49)
- Place of death: Tovuz
- Height: 1.76 m (5 ft 9 in)
- Position: Defender

Senior career*
Years	Team	Apps	(Gls)
1992–1997	Turan Tovuz	150	(30)
1997–1998	Kapaz	11	(0)
1998–2004	Turan Tovuz	99	(8)
Total		260	(38)

International career^{‡}
1995	Azerbaijan	1	(0)

Managerial career
- 2006–2007: Turan Tovuz
- 2010: Turan Tovuz
- * Club domestic league appearances and goals as of 13 October 2015 ‡ National team caps and goals as of 13 October 2015

Sakit Aliyev (22 December 1965 – 12 October 2015) was an Azerbaijani professional footballer who most notable played as a defender for Turan Tovuz and the Azerbaijan national team. Aliyev also managed Turan Tovuz on two occasions, between 2006 and 2007 and again in 2010.

== Death ==
On 12 October 2015, after a long illness, Aliyev died in his home town of Turan.

== Honours ==
Turan Tovuz

- Azerbaijan Top League (1): 1993–94

Kapaz

- Azerbaijan Top League (1): 1997–98
- Azerbaijan Cup (1): 1997–98
