= American football in American Samoa =

American football is a popular sport in North America, with many players competing to play in the National Football League, which is based in the United States. Football in American Samoa is generally played under the same rules as in the United States. As of 2010, the island had produced twenty-eight players who played in the NFL; this number has increased each year.

== History ==
Every year, the number of high school graduates from American Samoa who go on to play college football increases. In the recent past, the University of Hawaii was one of the few colleges that recruited players from American Samoa, with few exceptions. Today, schools such as BYU, Arizona, Wisconsin, USC, Stanford, Western Kentucky, UCLA, Cal, Texas Tech, Nevada, Tennessee-Chattanooga, and Washington send assistants to clinics that are held annually on the island. There are several obstacles that discourage coaches from recruiting in American Samoa, primarily the remote location and expenses incurred. Another is that the majority of the American Samoan athletes struggle to meet the NCAA academic standards, due to localization issues such as language barriers, access to mainland education, and means of affordability.
