= Football in the Central African Republic =

- Governing body: Central African Football Federation
- National team: men's national team

Club competitions
- Central African Republic League

International competitions
- Champions League; CAF Confederation Cup; Super Cup; FIFA Club World Cup; FIFA World Cup(National Team); African Cup of Nations(National Team)

Football is the number one sport in the Central African Republic. The national association has made conscious efforts to participate in all of the top international and regional championships. A 2–0 win over Ivory Coast in the qualifiers for the African Cup of Nations in 1972 still ranks as the nation's most significant success, although the return leg ended in a 4–1 defeat.

== League system ==
Level	League(s)/Division(s)
1	Division 1; 12 clubs
2	Division 2; 16 clubs

== Football stadiums ==
Stadium	City	Capacity	Tenants	Image
Barthélemy Boganda Stadium	Bangui	50,000	Central African Republic national football team	

== Attendances ==
The average attendance per top-flight football league season and the club with the highest average attendance:

Season	League average	Best club	Best club average
2023-24	361	AS Tempête Mocaf	782

Source: League page on Wikipedia

== See also ==
- Lists of stadiums
