= Football in Martinique =

Association Football is the leading sport in Martinique which is an overseas department of France. Several of France's leading footballers are of Martinique heritage, including Thierry Henry and Raphaël Varane.

The Martinique national football team are associate members of CONCACAF the North American federation. The team compete in CONCACAF competitions, such as the Gold Cup, but are not a member of FIFA as they are not a Sovereign State.

== League system ==
| Level | League(s)/Division(s) |
|---|---|
| 1 | Division d'Honneur; 14 clubs |
| 2 | Promotion d'Honneur Régionale; 14 clubs |
| 3 | Promotion d'Honneur; 14 clubs |
| 4 | Première Division; 15 clubs divided in 2 series, one of 8 clubs and one of 7 clubs |

== Stadiums in Martinique ==
| Stadium | Country | Capacity |
|---|---|---|
| Stade Pierre-Aliker | Martinique | 16,300 |
