= Football in the Cook Islands =

- Country: Cook Islands
- National team: men's national team

International competitions
- OFC Champions League; FIFA World Cup

The sport of football in the country of Cook Islands is run by the Cook Islands Football Association, a full member of the OFC and FIFA. The association administers the national football team. CIFA registered 13 full members as in football clubs, 6 Rarotonga Football Clubs (Avatiu Football Club, Matavera-Ngatangiia Football Club, Nikao Sokattak Football Club, Puaikura Football Club, Titikaveka Football Club, Tupapa Maraerenga Football Club); 7 Island associations Aitutaki Football Association, Atiu Football Association, Mangaia Football Association, Mauke Football Association, Mitiaro Football Association, Pukapuka Football Association and Rakahanga Football Association; and 3 associate members, Manihiki, Nassau and Penrhyn.

The main association football league on the Cook Islands is the Cook Islands Round Cup.

In 2026, Max Crocombe made history, being the first footballer of Cook Islands descent to play at the FIFA World Cup.

Other notable Cook Islanders to play professionally are Max Mata, Christian Bouckenooghe, Benjamin Mata, Emmett Connolly and Tacettin Kumsuz.

== National football stadium ==
| Stadium | Capacity | City |
|---|---|---|
| Avarua Tereora Stadium | 5,000 | Avarua |
