= Football in Liberia =

- Country: Liberia
- Governing body: Liberia Football Association
- National team: national football team

Club competitions
- Liberian Premier League

International competitions
- Champions League; CAF Confederation Cup; Super Cup; FIFA Club World Cup; FIFA World Cup(National Team); African Cup of Nations(National Team)

The sport of football in the country of Liberia is run by the Liberia Football Association. The association administers the national football team, as well as the Premier League. Football is the most popular sport in the country and George Weah is the country's most prominent player.

== Football stadiums in Liberia ==
Stadium	Capacity	City	Tenants	Image
Samuel Kanyon Doe Sports Complex	22,000	Paynesville	Liberia national football team	

== Attendances ==
The average attendance per top-flight football league season and the club with the highest average attendance:

Season	League average	Best club	Best club average
2022-23	206	LISCR	320

Source: League page on Wikipedia

== See also ==
- Lists of stadiums
