= Football in Samoa =

- Country: Samoa
- Governing body: Football Federation Samoa
- National team: men's national team

Club competitions
- Samoa National League

International competitions
- OFC Champions League; FIFA World Cup

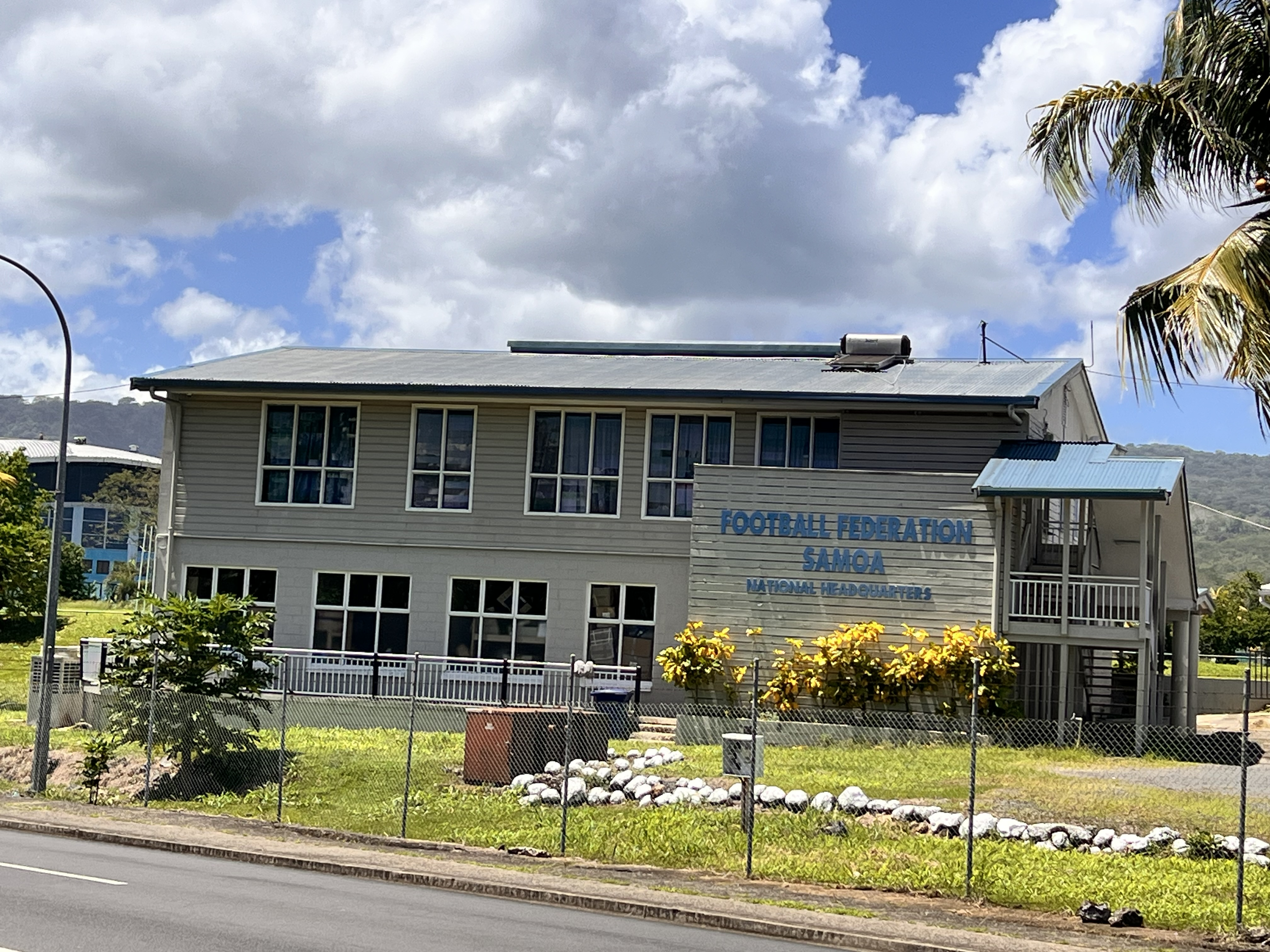

The sport of football in the country of Samoa is run by the Football Federation Samoa. The association administers the national football team, as well as the Samoa National League.

== Football stadiums ==
Stadium	Capacity	City	Tenants	Image
Apia Park	12,000	Apia		
