= Football in Oman =

- Country: Oman
- Governing body: Oman Football Association
- National team: men's national team

National competitions
- Sultan Qaboos Cup; Oman Super Cup; Oman Professional League Cup

Club competitions
- Oman Professional League; Oman First Division League

International competitions
- AFC Cup; AFC Champions League; FIFA World Cup; Asian Cup

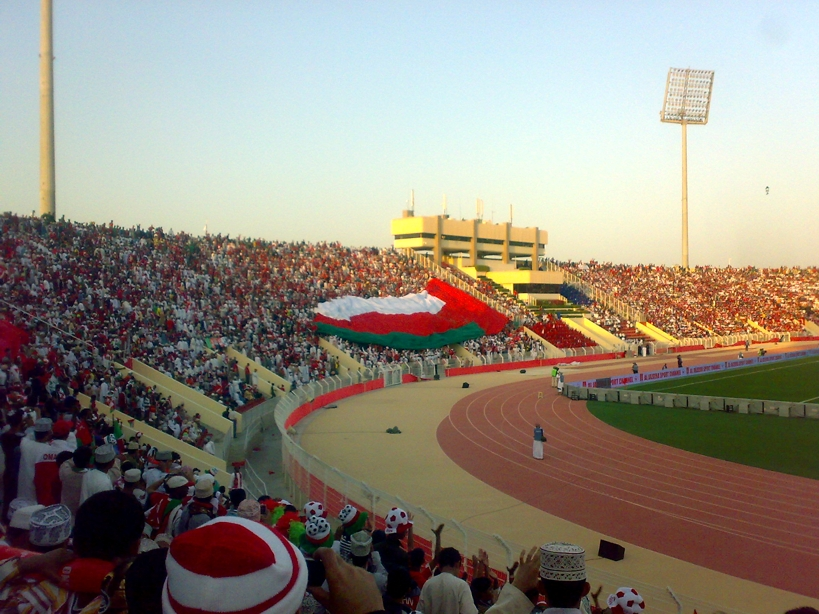
The Sultan Qaboos Stadium in Oman.

The sport of football in the country of Oman is run by the Oman Football Association. The association administers the national football team as well as the Omani League. Football is the most popular sport in the country. Approximately 30% of the people in Oman are considered association football fans.

== Attendances ==
The average attendance per top-flight football league season and the club with the highest average attendance:

| Season | League average | Best club | Best club average |
|---|---|---|---|
| 2024-25 | 257 | Al-Seeb | 403 |

Source: League page on Wikipedia

== See also ==
- List of football stadiums in Oman
- Sports in Oman
