= Football in the Republic of the Congo =

Football
- Governing body: Congolese Football Federation
- National team: men's national team
- Nickname: Diablotins Rouges

International competitions
- Champions League; CAF Confederation Cup; Super Cup; FIFA Club World Cup; FIFA World Cup(National Team); African Cup of Nations(National Team)

Football is the number one sport in the Congo. The national team, known as the Diablotins Rouges (meaning the Red Devils), has reached the finals of the African Cup of Nations on six occasions. They won the gold medal in Cameroon in 1972, and also reached the semi-finals two years later in Egypt. Several good players have come out of the Congo, many of whom have gone to France to play. In 1974, Paul Sayal Moukila won the Golden Ball for the African Player of the Year.

== Football stadiums in the Republic of the Congo ==
#	Stadium	City	Capacity	Tenants	Image
1	Stade Municipal de Kintélé	Brazzaville	60,000	Congo national football team	
2	Stade Alphonse Massemba-Débat	Brazzaville	33,037		
3	Stade de Ouesso	Ouesso	16,000		
4	Stade municipal	Pointe-Noire	13,000		
5	Stade omnisport Marien Ngouabi d’Owando	Owando	13,000		
6	Stade de Djambala	Djambala	7,000		

== Attendances ==
The average attendance per top-flight football league season and the club with the highest average attendance:

Season	League average	Best club	Best club average
2022-23	481	Diables Noirs	1,812

== See also ==
- Lists of stadiums
