= Football in Zanzibar =

The sport of football in the territory of Zanzibar is run by the Zanzibar Football Association. The association administers the national football team, as well as the Zanzibar Premier League.
