= Football in Réunion =

The sport of Association football in the country of Réunion is run by the Réunionese Football League. The association administers the national football team, as well as the Réunion Premier League.

== League system ==
Level	League(s)/Division(s)
1	Division 1; 12 clubs
	↓↑ 2 clubs
2	Super Division 2; 14 clubs
	↓↑ 3 clubs
3	Division 2 Départementale; 42 clubs divided in 3 series of 14
	↓↑ 6 clubs
4	Division 3 Départementale; 53 clubs divided in 4 series, two of 14 clubs, one of 13 clubs and one of 12 clubs

== Football stadiums in Réunion ==
Stadium	Capacity	City	Image
Stade Paul Julius Bénard	8,288	Saint-Paul	
Stade Michel Volnay	8,010	Saint-Pierre	
Stade Jean-Ivoula	7,500	Saint-Denis	
