= Association football in Laos =

- Country: Laos
- Governing body: Lao Football Federation
- National team: Laos

Some activities of the sport of association football in the country of Laos is run by the Lao Football Federation.

== Football stadiums ==
| Stadium | City | Capacity | Tenants | Image |
|---|---|---|---|---|
| New Laos National Stadium | Vientiane | 25,000 | Laos national football team | |
| Chao-Aouvong Stadium | Vientiane | 15,000 | | |
