= Football in Gabon =

- Country: Gabon
- Governing body: Gabonese Football Federation
- National team: men's national team
- Clubs: Gabon Championnat National D1

International competitions
- Champions League; CAF Confederation Cup; Super Cup; FIFA Club World Cup; FIFA World Cup(National Team); African Cup of Nations(National Team)

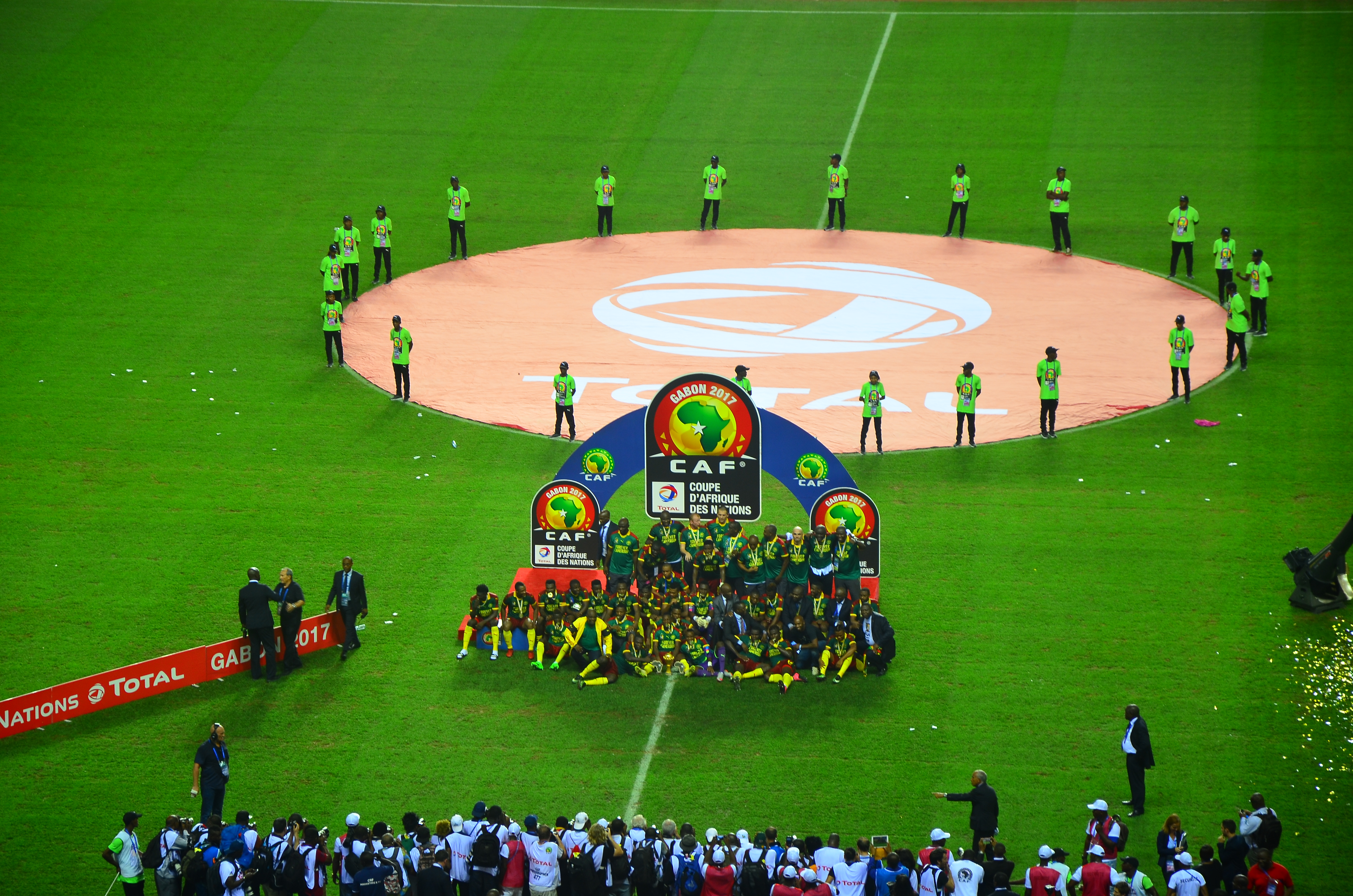
Cameroon celebrating winning the 2017 Africa Cup of Nations in Gabon.

The sport of football in the country of Gabon is run by the Gabonese Football Federation. The association administers the national football team, as well as the national league. Football is the most popular sport in the country.

== Football stadiums in Gabon ==
A minimum capacity of 5,000 is required.

#	Stadium	Capacity	City	Sport	Image
1	Stade d'Angondjé	40,000	Libreville	Association football	
2	Stade de Franceville	22,000	Franceville	Association football	
3	Stade d'Oyem	20,500	Oyem	Association football	
4	Stade de Port-Gentil	20,000	Port-Gentil	Association football	

== Attendances ==
The average attendance per top-flight football league season and the club with the highest average attendance:

Season	League average	Best club	Best club average
2018	204	US Bitam	671

Source: League page on Wikipedia
