= Football in Sierra Leone =

- Governing body: Sierra Leone Football Association
- National team: men's national team

National competitions
- Sierra Leone FA Cup

Club competitions
- Sierra Leone National Premier League

International competitions
- Champions League; CAF Confederation Cup; Super Cup; FIFA Club World Cup; FIFA World Cup (national team); African Cup of Nations (national team)

Football is the most popular sport in Sierra Leone. The governing body is the Sierra Leone Football Association (SLFA). The SLFA was formed in 1960 and has been affiliated with FIFA beginning the same year. There has been and continues to be trouble within the sport in Sierra Leone. In the past, however, the country has achieved a modicum of success in international competition.

== National competition ==
The Sierra Leone National Premier League is the top football league in Sierra Leone, with 14 teams. At the completion of each season, the two worst teams are relegated to the second tier, and their places taken by promoted teams. East End Lions and Mighty Blackpool are the two biggest and most successful football clubs, but Kallon F.C. is also improving, winning the Premier League in 2006.

The Sierra Leone FA Cup is the national knockout competition. It was established in 1967.

Sierra Leonean teams, as well as those of other African countries, have to compete with European football, especially the English Premier League, for the hearts of fans. The country is home to one of the largest Manchester City supporters clubs outside of the UK. In 2009 and 2010, fans and supporters of Manchester City raised funds to send a second-hand bus to Sierra Leone to provide transport for away games.

== International competition ==
The Sierra Leone national football team is popularly known as the Leone Stars and represents the country in international football competitions. Though the team has never qualified for the FIFA World Cup, they did participate in the 1994 and 1996 African Cup of Nations. On 3 September 2016, the national team had a chance to qualify for the Africa Cup for the first time in 20 years if they could defeat Ivory Coast, but only managed a 1-1 draw in an away match.

The top two Premier League teams represent the country in the Confederation of African Football (CAF) Champions League and Confederation Cup. Kallon F.C. eliminated 2006 Nigerian Premier League Champions Ocean Boys FC in the 2007 CAF Champions League first qualifying round, but later lost to ASEC Mimosas of Ivory Coast in the second qualifying round for the group stage.

The Sierra Leone U-17 football team, nicknamed the Sierra Stars, finished as runner-up at the 2003 African U-17 Championship in Swaziland, falling 1-0 to Cameroon, but came in last place in their group at the 2003 FIFA U-17 World Championship in Finland.

The women's national team is known as the Sierra Queens.

== Troubled decade: 2010s ==
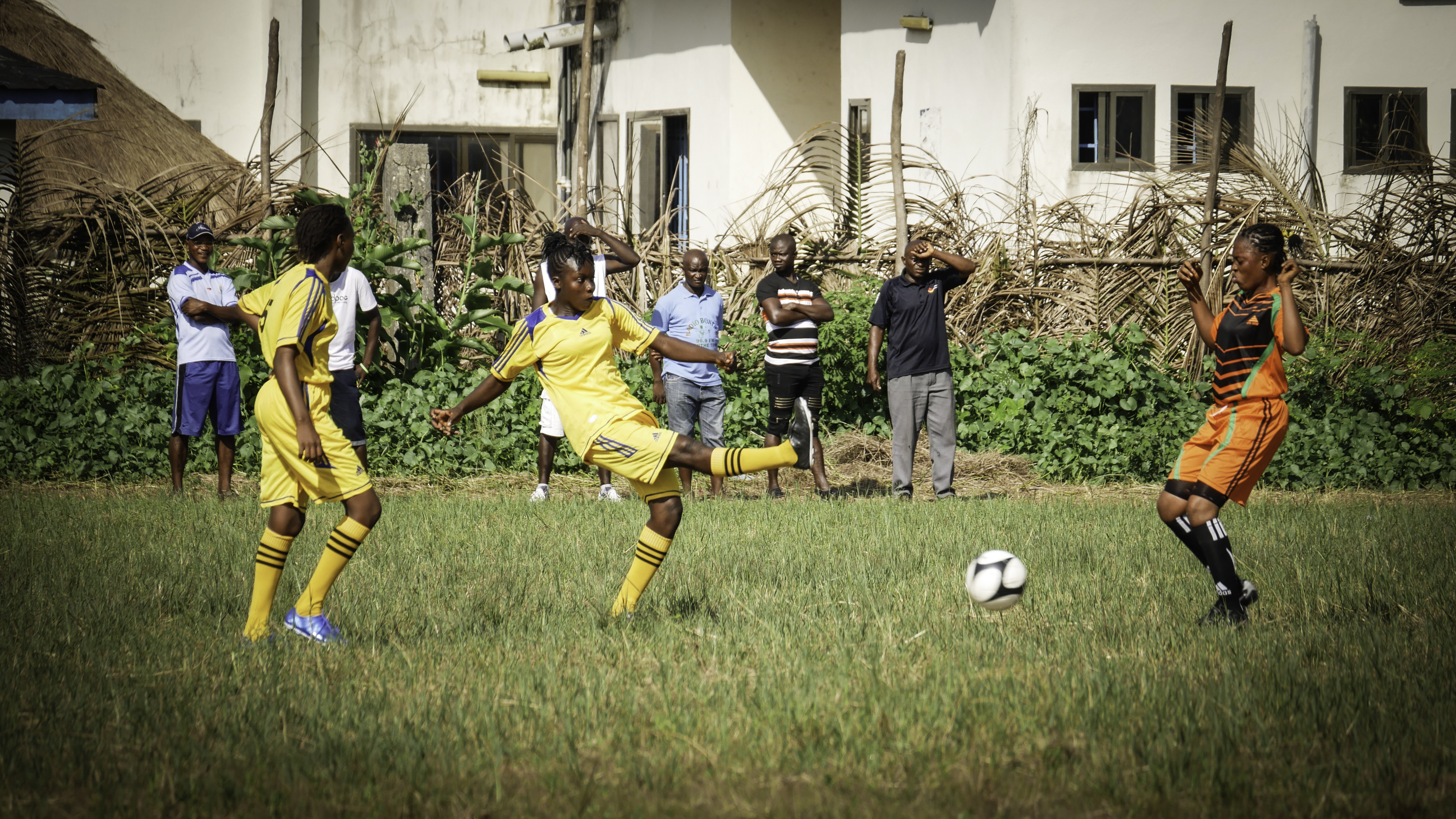
Football match promoting gender equality in Sierra Leone.

The 2010s proved to be a decade of turmoil for the sport in Sierra Leone. The outbreak of Ebola in western Africa resulted in the Confederation of African Football instituting a ban preventing Sierra Leone, as well as Liberia and Guinea, from playing home games within the country beginning in August 2014; only after Sierra Leone was declared Ebola-free was the ban lifted in December 2015. (Liberia's ban ended in September 2015, and Guinea's in January 2016.) From 2013 to the middle of 2016, there were two FA Cups and one league season.

In June 2014, allegations were made that two football officials and a national under-20 coach fixed two matches, in 2008 and 2009.

There is also ongoing dissatisfaction harboured by fans and teams against the SLFA, headed by Isha Johansen. On 9 December 2015, the National Sport Council decided to dissolve the SLFA's executive committee. The SLFA, however, refused to accept the decision. Attendance is low at SLFA-organised games, even one where entry was free. Eleven of fourteen of the premier league teams formed a breakaway league that ended in early 2016; it also failed to attract large crowds. Six premier league teams boycotted the 2016 FA Cup.

On 7 September 2016, SLFA President Isha Johansen, Vice President Brima Kamara and Secretary General Christopher Kamara were jailed by the Anti-Corruption Commission for failing to provide reports regarding the SLFA's financial statements and the use of money. The trio were released after posting bail. FIFA defended the SLFA in a letter, stating, "FIFA has no reason to suspect there has been misuse of funds that FIFA has provided to the SLFA", having audited the SLFA's accounts earlier in the year.

== Attendances ==
The average attendance per top-flight football league season and the club with the highest average attendance:

Season	League average	Best club	Best club average
2019	1,789	Kallon	11,375

Source: League page on Wikipedia
