= Football in Yemen =

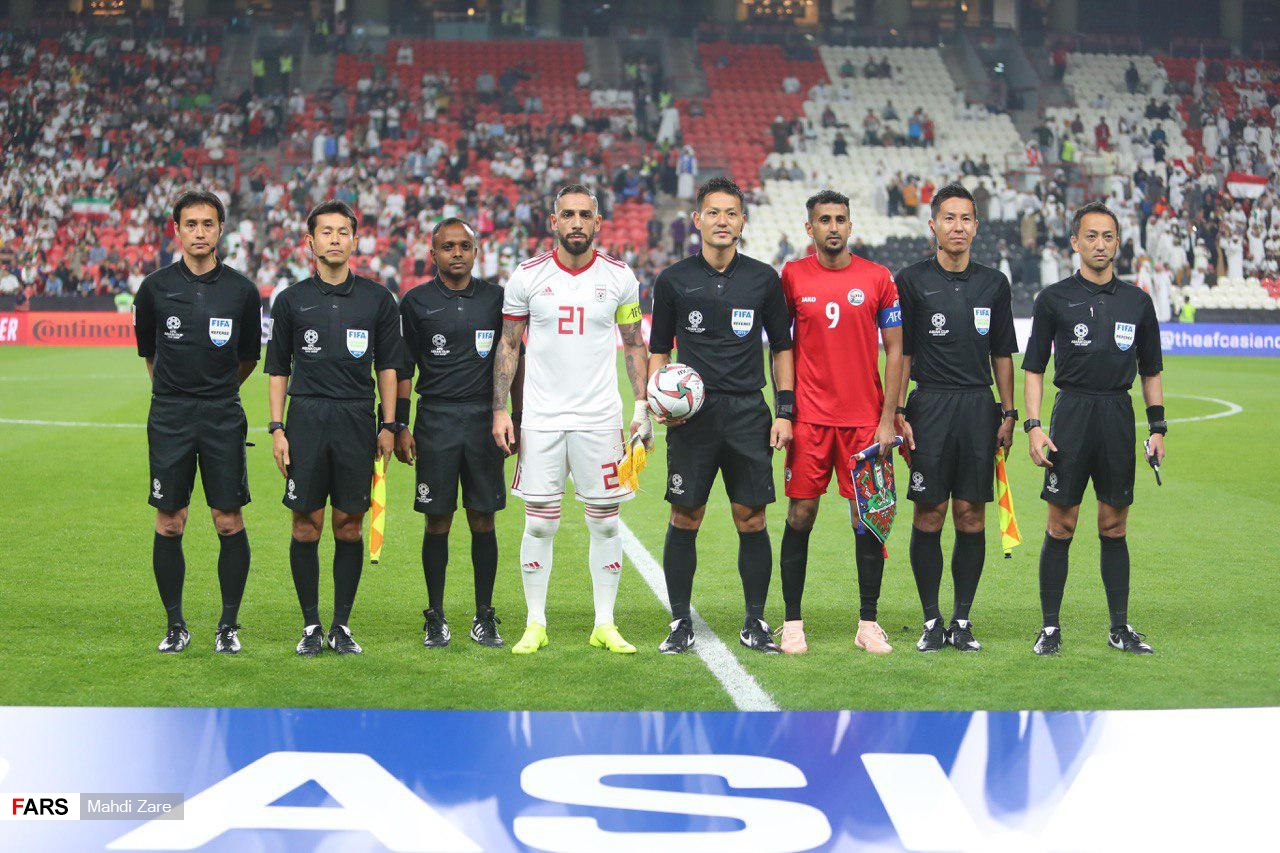
- Yemen against Iran at the 2019 AFC Asian Cup
- Country: Yemen
- Governing body: Yemen Football Association
- National team: men's national team

Club competitions
- Yemeni League; Yemeni President Cup; Yemeni Super Cup

International competitions
- AFC Cup; AFC Champions League; FIFA World Cup; Asian Cup

Football in Yemen is run by the Yemen Football Association. The association administers the Yemen national football team, as well as the Yemeni League.

Football is the most popular sport in Yemen. The Yemen national football team competes in the FIFA and AFC leagues. The country also hosts football clubs that compete nationally and internationally.

Yemen hosted the 20th Arabian Gulf Cup in Aden in 2010. Yemen was defeated in the first three rounds. The development of football in Yemen is often thought to be held by back many of Yemen's internal problems such as terrorist attack threats, political tension between the North and South, an unstable economy, and a high illiteracy rate. The Yemeni national team has never won a championship.

== Popularity ==
Despite a population of over 20 million inhabitants, Yemen has only 9,200 registered players. Many of the clubs in the Yemeni League offer free admission to their matches, but despite this incentive attendance is declining and support is waning. Approximately 15% of the people in Yemen are considered football fans.

== Broadcasting ==
While football is the most popular sport in Yemen, its domestic league is overshadowed by the more popular European leagues of Spain's La Liga which Yemenis prefer to watch and support.

== Civil unrest (2015-present) ==
Due to the Yemeni Civil War, football in Yemen has stood at a standstill at a professional level. The Yemeni League hasn't been active since 2014 despite the national team playing in competitions. It is unlikely that football in Yemen will continue professionally in the near future however popularity among locals in amateur matches still thrive.

== National team ==
Yemen's greatest football achievement is qualifying for the 2019 AFC Asian Cup.

== Football stadiums in Yemen ==
Note that many stadiums in Yemen are damaged because of the war.

#	Stadium	City	Capacity	Tenants	Image
1	Seiyun Olympic Stadium	Seiyun	50,000		
2	Al-Wihda Stadium	Zinjibar	30,000	Hassan Abyan	
3	Baradem Mukalla Stadium	Mukalla	15,000	Al-Sha'ab Hadhramaut	
4	Al Ulufi Stadium	Al Hudaydah	10,000	Al-Hilal Al-Sahili	

== Attendances ==
The average attendance per top-flight football league season and the club with the highest average attendance:

Season	League average	Best club	Best club average
2023–24	518	Al-Ahli Sana'a	1,164

Source: League page on Wikipedia

== See also ==
- List of football clubs in Yemen
- Lists of stadiums
