= Football in Guadeloupe =

The sport of association football in Guadeloupe is administered by the Ligue Guadeloupéenne de Football. The association administers the national football team, as well as the Guadeloupe Division d'Honneur. Guadeloupe is not a member of FIFA.

== League system ==
Level	League(s)/Division(s)
1	Division d'Honneur; 18 clubs
	↓↑ 3 clubs
2	Promotion d'Honneur Régionale; 14 clubs
	↓↑ 3 clubs
3	Promotion d'Honneur; 14 clubs
	↓↑ 4 clubs
4	Première Division; 23 clubs divided in 2 series, one of 12 clubs and one of 11 clubs

== Football stadiums in Guadeloupe ==
Stadium	Capacity	City
Stade René Serge Nabajoth	7,500	Les Abymes
