= Football in Chad =

- Governing body: Chadian Football Federation
- National team: men's national team

Club competitions
- Chad Premier League

International competitions
- Champions League; CAF Confederation Cup; Super Cup; FIFA Club World Cup; FIFA World Cup (National Team); African Cup of Nations (National Team)

A football player playing for the Chad national football team.

Football is by far the most popular sport in Chad. Many of top Chadian footballers have played professionally in France. According to one source, Nambatingue Tokomon, known as "Toko", played for renowned French soccer clubs, including Paris St. Germain, in the 1970s and 1980s. Abdoulay Karateka also played for Paris St. Germain. Ndoram Japhet played for Nantes and Monaco in the 1990s. The national team represents football in Chad internationally, however, the squad has never qualified for the FIFA World Cup or the African Cup of Nations. They did not enter qualification tournaments for the World Cup until 2002.

== Football stadiums in Chad ==
This list contains football stadiums in Chad. The Stade Omnisports Idriss Mahamat Ouya is currently the largest stadium in Chad by capacity. It is used by the national football team of Chad.

Stadium	City	Tenants	Capacity	Image
Stade olympique Maréchal Idriss Déby Itno	N'Djamena	Chad national football team	30,000	
Stade Omnisports Idriss Mahamat Ouya	N'Djamena		20,000	

== Attendances ==
The average attendance per top-flight football league season and the club with the highest average attendance:

Season	League average	Best club	Best club average
2023-24	672	AS CotonTchad	1,038

Source: League page on Wikipedia

== See also ==
- Lists of stadiums
