= 2017 in association football =

The following were the scheduled events of association football for the year 2017 throughout the world.

== Events ==
=== Men's national teams ===
- 17 June – 2 July: 2017 FIFA Confederations Cup in Russia
  - (gold) : Germany
  - (silver) : Chile
  - (bronze) : Portugal
  - 4th: Mexico

==== AFC ====
- 9 – 16 December: 2017 EAFF E-1 Football Championship in Japan
  - (gold) : South Korea
  - (silver) : Japan
  - (bronze) : China
  - 4th: North Korea

==== CAF ====
- 14 January – 5 February: 2017 Africa Cup of Nations in Gabon
  - (gold) : Cameroon
  - (silver) : Egypt
  - (bronze) : Burkina Faso
  - 4th: Ghana

==== CONCACAF ====
- 13 – 22 January: 2017 Copa Centroamericana in Panama
  - (gold) : Honduras
  - (silver) : Panama
  - (bronze) : El Salvador
  - 4th: Costa Rica
- 7 – 26 July: 2017 CONCACAF Gold Cup in the United States
  - (gold) : United States
  - (silver) : Jamaica

=== Youth ===
- 18 January – 11 February: 2017 South American Youth Football Championship in Ecuador
  - (gold) : Uruguay
  - (silver) : Ecuador
  - (bronze) : Venezuela
  - 4th: Argentina
- 11 – 24 February: 2017 OFC U-17 Championship in Tahiti
  - (gold) : New Zealand
  - (silver) : New Caledonia
- 17 February – 5 March: 2017 CONCACAF U-20 Championship in Costa Rica
  - (gold) : United States
  - (silver) : Honduras
- 23 February – 19 March: 2017 South American Under-17 Football Championship in Chile
  - (gold) : Brazil
  - (silver) : Chile
  - (bronze) : Paraguay
  - 4th: Colombia
- 26 February – 12 March: 2017 Africa U-20 Cup of Nations in Zambia
  - (gold) : Zambia
  - (silver) : Senegal
  - (bronze) : Guinea
  - 4th: South Africa
- 21 April – 7 May: 2017 CONCACAF U-17 Championship in Panama
  - (gold) : Mexico
  - (silver) : United States
- 3 May – 19 May: 2017 UEFA European Under-17 Championship in Croatia
  - (gold) : Spain
  - (silver) : England
- 14 – 28 May: 2017 Africa U-17 Cup of Nations in Gabon
  - (gold) : Mali
  - (silver) : Ghana
  - (bronze) : Guinea
  - 4th: Niger
- 20 May – 11 June: 2017 FIFA U-20 World Cup in South Korea
  - (gold) : England
  - (silver) : Venezuela
  - (bronze) : Italy
  - 4th: Uruguay
- 16 – 30 June: 2017 UEFA European Under-21 Championship in Poland
  - (gold) : Germany
  - (silver) : Spain
- 2 – 15 July: 2017 UEFA European Under-19 Championship in Georgia
  - (gold) : England
  - (silver) : Portugal
- 18 – 27 September: 2017 SAFF U-18 Championship in Bhutan
  - (gold) : Nepal
  - (silver) : Bangladesh
  - (bronze) : India
  - 4th: Bhutan
- 6 – 28 October: 2017 FIFA U-17 World Cup in India
  - (gold) : England
  - (silver) : Spain
  - (bronze) : Brazil
  - 4th: Mali

=== Women's ===
- 16 July – 6 August: UEFA Women's Euro 2017 in the Netherlands
  - (gold) : Netherlands
  - (silver) : Denmark
- 8 – 16 December: 2017 EAFF E-1 Football Championship (women) in Japan
  - (gold) : North Korea
  - (silver) : Japan
  - (bronze) : China
  - 4th: South Korea

=== Women's youth ===
- 2 – 14 May: 2017 UEFA Women's Under-17 Championship in the Czech Republic
  - (gold) : Germany
  - (silver) : Spain
- 8 – 20 August: 2017 UEFA Women's Under-19 Championship in Northern Ireland
  - (gold) : Spain
  - (silver) : France
- 10 – 23 September: 2017 AFC U-16 Women's Championship in Thailand
  - (gold) : North Korea
  - (silver) : South Korea
  - (bronze) : Japan
  - 4th: China
- 14 – 28 October: 2017 AFC U-19 Women's Championship in China
  - (gold) : Japan
  - (silver) : North Korea
  - (bronze) : China
  - 4th: Australia

=== Multi-sport events ===
==== Men's ====
- 14–29 August: Southeast Asian Games in Malaysia
  - (gold) : Thailand
  - (silver) : Malaysia
  - (bronze) : Indonesia
  - 4th: Myanmar

==== Women's ====
- 15–24 August: Southeast Asian Games in Malaysia
  - (gold) : Vietnam
  - (silver) : Thailand
  - (bronze) : Myanmar
  - 4th: Philippines

== News ==
- February 3 – CAS rejected the request for provisional measures made by Jeonbuk Hyundai Motors in relation to the club's entry into the 2017 AFC Champions League.

== Fixed dates for national team matches ==
Scheduled international matches per their International Match Calendar. Also known as FIFA International Day/Date(s).

- 20–28 March
- 5–13 June
- 28 August – 5 September
- 2–10 October
- 6–14 November

== Club continental champions ==
=== Men ===
Region	Tournament	Defending champion	Champion	Title	Last honor
AFC (Asia)	2017 AFC Champions League	(South Korea) Jeonbuk Hyundai Motors	(Japan) Urawa Red Diamonds	2	2007
AFC (Asia)	2017 AFC Cup	(Iraq) Al-Quwa Al-Jawiya	(Iraq) Al-Quwa Al-Jawiya	2	2016
CAF (Africa)	2017 CAF Champions League	(South Africa) Mamelodi Sundowns	(Morocco) Wydad Casablanca	2	1992
CAF (Africa)	2017 CAF Confederation Cup	(Democratic Republic of the Congo) TP Mazembe	(Democratic Republic of the Congo) TP Mazembe	2	2016
CAF (Africa)	2017 CAF Super Cup	(Democratic Republic of the Congo) TP Mazembe	(South Africa) Mamelodi Sundowns	1	—
CONCACAF (North and Central America, Caribbean)	2016–17 CONCACAF Champions League	(Mexico) América	(Mexico) Pachuca	5	2009–10
CONCACAF (North and Central America, Caribbean)	2017 CONCACAF League	—	(Honduras) Olimpia	1	—
CONCACAF (North and Central America, Caribbean)	2017 CFU Club Championship	(Trinidad and Tobago) Central	(Dominican Republic) Cibao	1	—
CONMEBOL (South America)	2017 Copa Libertadores	(Colombia) Atlético Nacional	(Brazil) Grêmio	3	1995
CONMEBOL (South America)	2017 Copa Sudamericana	(Brazil) Chapecoense (Note: Awarded title by CONMEBOL after most of the team died in a plane crash on their way to the first leg of the final, at the urging of their intended opponent, Atlético Nacional.)	(Argentina) Independiente	2	2010
CONMEBOL (South America)	2017 Recopa Sudamericana	(Argentina) River Plate	(Colombia) Atlético Nacional	1	—
OFC (Oceania)	2017 OFC Champions League	(New Zealand) Auckland City	(New Zealand) Auckland City	9	2016
UEFA (Europe)	2016–17 UEFA Champions League	(Spain) Real Madrid	(Spain) Real Madrid	12	2015–16
UEFA (Europe)	2016–17 UEFA Europa League	(Spain) Sevilla	(England) Manchester United	1	—
UEFA (Europe)	2017 UEFA Super Cup	(Spain) Real Madrid	(Spain) Real Madrid	4	2016
UAFA (Arab States)	2017 Arab Club Championship	(Algeria) USM Alger	(Tunisia) Espérance de Tunis	3	2008–09
FIFA (Worldwide)	2017 FIFA Club World Cup	(Spain) Real Madrid	(Spain) Real Madrid	3	2016

=== Women ===
Region	Tournament	Defending champion	Champion	Title	Last honor
CONMEBOL (South America)	2017 Copa Libertadores Femenina	(Paraguay) Sportivo Limpeño	(Brazil) Audax/Corinthians	1	—
UEFA (Europe)	2016–17 UEFA Women's Champions League	(France) Lyon	(France) Lyon	4	2015–16

== Domestic leagues ==
=== UEFA ===
Nation	Tournament	Champion	Second place	Title	Last honor
Albania	2016–17 Albanian Superliga	Kukësi	Partizani Tirana	1	—
Andorra	2016–17 Primera Divisió	FC Santa Coloma	Sant Julià	11	2015–16
Armenia	2016–17 Armenian Premier League	Alashkert	Gandzasar Kapan	2	2015–16
Austria	2016–17 Austrian Football Bundesliga	Red Bull Salzburg	Austria Wien	11	2015–16
Azerbaijan	2016–17 Azerbaijan Premier League	Qarabağ	Gabala	5	2015–16
Belarus	2017 Belarusian Premier League	BATE Borisov	Dinamo Minsk	14	2016
Belgium	2016–17 Belgian First Division A	Anderlecht	Club Brugge	34	2013–14
Bosnia and Herzegovina	2016–17 Premier League of Bosnia and Herzegovina	Zrinjski Mostar	Željezničar Sarajevo	5	2015–16
Bulgaria	2016–17 First Professional Football League	Ludogorets Razgrad	CSKA Sofia	6	2015–16
Croatia	2016–17 Croatian First Football League	Rijeka	Dinamo Zagreb	1	—
Cyprus	2016–17 Cypriot First Division	APOEL	AEK Larnaca	26	2015–16
Czech Republic	2016–17 Czech First League	Slavia Prague	Viktoria Plzeň	17	2008–09
Denmark	2016–17 Danish Superliga	Copenhagen	Brøndby	12	2015–16
England	2016–17 Premier League	Chelsea	Tottenham Hotspur	6	2014–15
Estonia	2017 Meistriliiga	Flora	Levadia	11	2015
Faroe Islands	2017 Effodeildin	Víkingur Gøta	KÍ	2	2016
Finland	2017 Veikkausliiga	HJK Helsinki	KuPS	28	2014
France	2016–17 Ligue 1	Monaco	Paris Saint-Germain	8	1999–2000
(Georgia (country)) Georgia	2017 Erovnuli Liga	Torpedo Kutaisi	Dinamo Tbilisi	4	2001–02
Germany	2016–17 Bundesliga	Bayern Munich	RB Leipzig	27	2015–16
Gibraltar	2016–17 Gibraltar Premier Division	Europa	Lincoln Red Imps	7	1951–52
Greece	2016–17 Super League Greece	Olympiacos	AEK Athens	44	2015–16
Hungary	2016–17 Nemzeti Bajnokság I	Honvéd	Videoton	14	1992–93
Iceland	2017 Úrvalsdeild	Valur	Stjarnan	21	2007
(Republic of Ireland) Ireland	2017 League of Ireland Premier Division	Cork City	Dundalk	3	2005
Israel	2016–17 Israeli Premier League	Hapoel Be'er Sheva	Maccabi Tel Aviv	4	2015–16
Italy	2016–17 Serie A	Juventus	Roma	33	2015–16
Kazakhstan	2017 Kazakhstan Premier League	Astana	Kairat	4	2016
Kosovo	2016–17 Football Superleague of Kosovo	Trepça'89	Prishtina	1	—
Latvia	2017 Latvian Higher League	Spartaks Jūrmala	Liepāja	2	2016
Lithuania	2017 A Lyga	Sūduva	Žalgiris	1	–
Luxembourg	2016–17 Luxembourg National Division	F91 Dudelange	Differdange 03	13	2015–16
(North Macedonia) Macedonia	2016–17 Macedonian First Football League	Vardar	Shkëndija	10	2015–16
Malta	2016–17 Maltese Premier League	Hibernians	Balzan	11	2014–15
Moldova	2016–17 Moldovan National Division	Sheriff Tiraspol	Dacia Chișinău	15	2015–16
Montenegro	2016–17 Montenegrin First League	Budućnost Podgorica	Zeta	3	2011–12
Netherlands	2016–17 Eredivisie	Feyenoord	Ajax	15	1998–99
Northern Ireland	2016–17 NIFL Premiership	Linfield	Crusaders	52	2011–12
Norway	2017 Eliteserien	Rosenborg	Molde	25	2016
Poland	2016–17 Ekstraklasa	Legia Warsaw	Jagiellonia Białystok	12	2015–16
Portugal	2016–17 Primeira Liga	Benfica	Porto	36	2015–16
Romania	2016–17 Liga I	Viitorul Constanța	Steaua București	1	—
Russia	2016–17 Russian Premier League	Spartak Moscow	CSKA Moscow	22	2001
San Marino	2016–17 Campionato Sammarinese di Calcio	La Fiorita	Tre Penne	4	2013–14
Scotland	2016–17 Scottish Premiership	Celtic	Aberdeen	48	2015–16
Serbia	2016–17 Serbian SuperLiga	Partizan	Red Star Belgrade	27	2014–15
Slovakia	2016–17 Slovak First Football League	Žilina	Slovan Bratislava	7	2011–12
Slovenia	2016–17 Slovenian PrvaLiga	Maribor	Gorica	14	2014–15
Spain	2016–17 La Liga	Real Madrid	Barcelona	33	2011–12
Sweden	2017 Allsvenskan	Malmö	AIK	20	2016
Switzerland	2016–17 Swiss Super League	Basel	Young Boys	20	2015–16
Turkey	2016–17 Süper Lig	Beşiktaş	İstanbul Başakşehir	15	2015–16
Ukraine	2016–17 Ukrainian Premier League	Shakhtar Donetsk	Dynamo Kyiv	10	2013–14
Wales	2016–17 Welsh Premier League	The New Saints	Connah's Quay Nomads	11	2015–16

=== AFC ===
Nation	Tournament	Champion	Second place	Title	Last honor
Afghanistan	2017 Afghan Premier League	Shaheen Asmayee	De Maiwand Atalan	4	2016
Australia	2016–17 A-League	Sydney FC	Melbourne Victory	3	2009–10
Bahrain	2016–17 Bahrain First Division League	Malkiya	Riffa	1	—
Bangladesh	2017 Bangladesh Football Premier League	Dhaka Abahani Ltd.	Sheikh Jamal DC	6	2016
Bhutan	2017 Bhutan National League	Transport United	Thimphu City	5	2007
Brunei	2017–18 Brunei Super League	MS ABDB	Kota Ranger	3	2016
Cambodia	2017 Cambodian League	Boeung Ket	Svay Rieng	3	2016
China	2017 Chinese Super League	Guangzhou Evergrande	Shanghai SIPG	7	2016
Chinese Taipei	2017 Taiwan Football Premier League	Tatung F.C.	Taiwan Power Company F.C.	1	–
(Timor-Leste) East Timor	2017 Liga Futebol Amadora	Karketu Dili	Ponta Leste	1	—
Guam	2016–17 Guam Soccer League	Rovers	Guam Shipyard	4	2015–16
Hong Kong	2016–17 Hong Kong Premier League	Kitchee	Eastern	2	2014–15
India	2016–17 I-League	Aizawl	Mohun Bagan	1	—
Indonesia	2017 Liga 1	Bhayangkara	Bali United	1	—
Iran	2016–17 Iran Pro League	Persepolis	Esteghlal	10	2007–08
Iraq	2016–17 Iraqi Premier League	Al-Quwa Al-Jawiya	Al-Naft	6	2004–05
Japan	2017 J1 League	Kawasaki Frontale	Kashima Antlers	1	–
Jordan	2016–17 Jordan League	Al-Faisaly	Al-Jazeera	33	2011–12
Kyrgyzstan	2017 Kyrgyzstan League	Alay Osh	Abdysh-Ata Kant	4	2016
Kuwait	2016–17 Kuwaiti Premier League	Al Kuwait	Al Qadsia	13	2014–15
Laos	2017 Lao Premier League	Lao Toyota	Lao Police	2	2015
Lebanon	2016–17 Lebanese Premier League	Al-Ahed	Salam Zgharta	5	2014–15
Macau	2017 Liga de Elite	Benfica de Macau	Monte Carlo	4	2016
Malaysia	2017 Malaysia Super League	Johor Darul Ta'zim	Pahang	4	2016
Maldives	2017 Dhivehi Premier League	New Radiant S.C.	T.C. Sports Club	2	2015
Mongolia	2017 Mongolian Premier League	Erchim	Ulaanbaatar City	5	2016
Myanmar	2017 Myanmar National League	Shan United	Yangon United	1	–
Oman	2016–17 Oman Professional League	Dhofar	Al-Shabab	10	2004–05
Palestine	2016–17 West Bank Premier League	Hilal Al-Quds	Thaqafi Tulkarm	2	2011–12
Philippines	2017 Philippines Football League	Ceres–Negros	Global Cebu	1	—
Qatar	2016–17 Qatar Stars League	Lekhwiya	Al-Sadd	5	2014–15
Saudi Arabia	2016–17 Saudi Professional League	Al-Hilal	Al-Ahli	5	2010–11
Singapore	2017 S.League	Albirex Niigata (S)	Tampines Rovers	2	2016
South Korea	2017 K League Classic	Jeonbuk Hyundai Motors	Jeju United	5	2015
Sri Lanka	2016–17 Sri Lanka Football Premier League	Colombo	Renown	2	2015–16
Syria	2016–17 Syrian Premier League	Al-Jaish	Tishreen	15	2015–16
Tajikistan	2017 Tajik League	Istiklol	Khujand	6	2016
Thailand	2017 Thai League 1	Buriram United	Muangthong United	6	2015
Turkmenistan	2017 Ýokary Liga	Altyn Asyr	Ahal	4	2016
United Arab Emirates	2016–17 UAE Pro-League	Al-Jazira	Al-Wasl	2	2010–11
Uzbekistan	2017 Uzbek League	Lokomotiv Tashkent	FC Nasaf	2	2016
Vietnam	2017 V.League 1	Quảng Nam	FLC Thanh Hóa	1	—

=== CAF ===
Nation	Tournament	Champion	Second place	Title	Last honor
Algeria	2016–17 Algerian Ligue Professionnelle 1	ES Sétif	MC Alger	8th	2014–15
Angola	2017 Girabola	1º de Agosto	Petro de Luanda	11th	2016
Benin	2017 Benin Premier League	Buffles du Borgou	Energie FC	4th	2013-14
Botswana	2016–17 Botswana Premier League	Township Rollers	Galaxy FC	14th	2015–16
Burkina Faso	2016–17 Burkinabé Premier League	Rail Club du Kadiogo	Étoile Filante	3rd	2015-16
Burundi	2016–17 Burundi Premier League	Le Messager	LLB S4A FC	1st	–
Cameroon	2017 Elite One	Eding Sport	Coton Sport	1st	–
Cape Verde	2017 Cape Verdean Football Championships	Sporting Clube da Praia	Ultramarina Tarrafal (São Nicolau)	13th	2012
Central African Republic	2016–17 Central African Republic League	Olympic Real de Bangui	Anges de Fatima	10th	2012
Chad	2017 LINAFOOT	Gazelle FC	Foullah Edifice FC	4th	2015
Comoros	2017 Comoros Premier League	Ngaya Club de Mdé	Belle Lumière	1st	—
(Republic of the Congo) Congo	2017 Ligue 1	AC Léopards	AS Otôho d'Oyo	4th	2016
(Democratic Republic of the Congo) DR Congo	2016–17 Linafoot	TP Mazembe	AS Vita Club	16th	2015–16
Djibouti	2016–17 Djibouti Premier League	Garde Républicaine FC	Bahache/Université de Djibouti	1st	—
Egypt	2016–17 Egyptian Premier League	Al Ahly	Misr Lel-Makkasa	39th	2015–16
Equatorial Guinea	2017 Equatoguinean Primera División	Vegetarianos FC	FC Bata	1st	—
Ethiopia	2016–17 Ethiopian Premier League	Kedus Giorgis	Dedebit	28th	2015-16
Gabon	2016–17 Gabon Championnat National D1	Mounana	Mangasport	2nd	2011-12
(The Gambia) Gambia	2016–17 GFA League First Division	GAMTEL	Fortune (Farato)	1st	–
Ghana	2017 Ghanaian Premier League	Aduana Stars	WAFA	2nd	2009-10
Guinea	2016–17 Guinée Championnat National	Horoya AC	Wakirya AC	16th	2015-16
Guinea-Bissau	2016–17 Campeonato Nacional da Guiné-Bissau	Benfica de Bissau	Nuno Tristão de Bula	1st	–
Ivory Coast	2016–17 Ligue 1	ASEC Mimosas	WAC	25th	2010
Kenya	2017 Kenyan Premier League	Gor Mahia	Tusker	16th	2015
Lesotho	2016–17 Lesotho Premier League	Bantu	Lioli	2nd	2013–14
Liberia	2016–17 Liberian First Division League	LISCR FC	Barrack Young Controllers	3rd	2011-12
Madagascar	2017 THB Champions League	CNaPS Sports	AS St.-Michel Elgeco Plus	1st	–
Malawi	2017 Malawi Premier Division	Be Forward Wanderers	Nyasa Big Bullets FC	1st	–
Mali	2017 Malian Première Division	Stade Malien	USC Kita	1st	–
Mauritania	2016–17 Ligue 1 Mauritania	ASAC Concorde	FC Tevragh-Zeïne	2nd	2008
Mauritius	2016–17 Mauritian Premier League	Pamplemousses SC	Petite Rivière Noire FC	4th	2012
Morocco	2016–17 Botola	Wydad Casablanca	Difaâ El Jadidi	14th	2014–15
Mozambique	2017 Moçambola	Songo	Costa do Sol	1st	–
Niger	2016–17 Niger Premier League	AS FAN	US Gendarmerie Nationale	5th	2010
Nigeria	2017 Nigeria Professional Football League	Plateau United	MFM	1st	–
Rwanda	2016–17 Rwanda National Football League	Rayon Sports F.C.	Police FC	8th	2013
São Tomé and Príncipe	2017 São Tomé and Príncipe Championship	UDRA	GD Os Operários	2nd	2014
Senegal	2016–17 Senegal Premier League	Génération Foot	Guédiawaye	1st	2016–17
Seychelles	2017 Seychelles First Division	Saint Louis Suns United	Côte d'Or	15th	1994
Somalia	2016–17 Somali First Division	Dekedda SC	Banaadir SC	1st	–
South Africa	2016–17 South African Premier Division	Bidvest Wits	Mamelodi Sundowns	1st	—
South Sudan	2017 South Sudan Football Championship	Wau Salaam FC	Kator FC	1st	–
Sudan	2017 Sudan Premier League	Al-Hilal	Al-Merreikh	26th	2016
(Eswatini) Swaziland	2016–17 Swazi Premier League	Mbabane Swallows	Young Buffaloes	6th	2013
Tanzania	2016–17 Tanzanian Premier League	Young Africans	Simba SC	27th	2015–16
Togo	2016–17 Togolese Championnat National	AS Togo-Port	AC Sèmassi de Sokodé	1st	–
Tunisia	2016–17 Tunisian Ligue Professionnelle 1	Espérance de Tunis	Étoile du Sahel	27th	2013–14
Uganda	2016–17 Uganda Super League	KCCA	SC Villa	12th	2015-16
Zambia	2017 Zambian Premier League	ZESCO United	Zanaco	6th	2015
Zimbabwe	2017 Zimbabwe Premier Soccer League	Platinum	Dynamos	1st	–

=== CONCACAF ===
Nation	Tournament	Champion	Second place	Title	Last honor
Anguilla	2016–17 AFA Senior Male League	Roaring Lions	Kicks United	6	2013-14
Antigua and Barbuda	2016–17 Antigua and Barbuda Premier Division	Parham	Hoppers	5	2014–15
Aruba	2016–17 Aruban Division di Honor	Nacional	Racing Club Aruba	5	2007
Barbados	2017 Barbados Premier Division	Weymouth Wales FC	BDF	16	1986
Belize	2017 Premier League Closing	Belmopan Bandits	Police United	7	2016 Opening
Belize	2017 Premier League Opening	Verdes	Belmopan Bandits	2	2015 Closing
Bermuda	2016–17 Bermudian Premier Division	Robin Hood	PHC Zebras	1	2016-17
Bonaire	2016–17 Bonaire League	SV Vespo	SV Juventus	3	2006–07
British Virgin Islands	2016–17 BVIFA National Football League	Islanders	Sugar Boys	7	2014–15
Cayman Islands	2016–17 Cayman Islands Premier League	Bodden Town	Elite	3	2013–14
Costa Rica	2017 Verano	Herediano	Saprissa	26	Verano 2016
Costa Rica	2017 Invierno	Saprissa	Herediano	33	2016 Invierno
Cuba	2017 Campeonato Nacional	Santiago de Cuba	Camagüey	1	–
Curaçao	2017 Curaçao Sekshon Pagál	Centro Dominguito	Scherpenheuvel	6	2016
Dominica	2016–17 Dominica Premiere League	Dublanc	Harlem	3	2015-16
Dominican Republic	2017 Liga Dominicana de Fútbol	Atlántico	Atlético Pantoja	1	–
El Salvador	2017 Clausura	Santa Tecla	Alianza	3	2016 Apertura
El Salvador	2017 Apertura	Alianza	Santa Tecla	11	2015
Guadeloupe	2016–17 Guadeloupe Division of Honor	USR	Gauloise	2	2015-16
Guatemala	2017 Clausura	Municipal	Antigua GFC	30	2011 Apertura
Guatemala	2017 Apertura	Antigua GFC	Municipal	3	2016 Apertura
Honduras	2017 Clausura	Motagua	Honduras Progreso	15	2016 Apertura
Honduras	2017 Apertura	Real España	Motagua	11	2013
Jamaica	2016–17 National Premier League	Arnett Gardens	Portmore United	5	2014–15
Mexico	2017 Liga MX Clausura	Guadalajara	UANL	12	2006 Apertura
Mexico	2017 Liga MX Apertura	UANL	Monterrey	6	2016 Apertura
Nicaragua	2017 Clausura	Real Estelí	Walter Ferretti	14	2016 Apertura
Nicaragua	2017 Apertura	Walter Ferretti	Managua	4	2015
Panama	2017 Clausura	Tauro	Árabe Unido	13	2013 Apertura
Panama	2017 Apertura	Chorrillo	Árabe Unido	3	2014 Clausura
Suriname	2016–17 SVB Topklasse	Inter Moengotapoe	Leo Victor	9	2015-16
Trinidad and Tobago	2016–17 TT Pro League	Central	W Connection	3	2015-16
Trinidad and Tobago	2017 TT Pro League	North East Stars	W Connection	2	2004
(United States Virgin Islands) U.S. Virgin Islands	2016–17 U.S. Virgin Islands Championship	Raymix	Helenites	2	2015–16
United States & Canada	2017 Major League Soccer	Toronto FC	Seattle Sounders FC	1	—

=== CONMEBOL ===
Nation	Tournament	Champion	Second place	Title	Last honor
Argentina	2016–17 Argentine Primera División	Boca Juniors	River Plate	32	2015
Bolivia	2017 Liga de Fútbol Profesional Boliviano Apertura	Bolívar	The Strongest	21	2015 Clausura
Bolivia	2017 Liga de Fútbol Profesional Boliviano Clausura	Bolívar	The Strongest	22	2017 Apertura
Brazil	2017 Campeonato Brasileiro Série A	Corinthians	Palmeiras	7	2015
Chile	2017 Chilean Primera División Clausura	Universidad de Chile	Colo-Colo	18	2014 Apertura
Chile	2017 Chilean Primera División Transición	Colo-Colo	Unión Española	32	2015 Apertura
Colombia	2017 Categoría Primera A Apertura	Atlético Nacional	Deportivo Cali	16	2015 Finalización
Colombia	2017 Categoría Primera A Finalización	Millonarios	Santa Fe	15	2012 Finalización
Ecuador	2017 Campeonato Ecuatoriano de Fútbol Serie A	Emelec	Delfiín	14	2015
Paraguay	2017 Paraguayan Primera División Apertura	Libertad	Guaraní	20	2016 Apertura
Paraguay	2017 Paraguayan Primera División Clausura	Cerro Porteño	Olimpia	32	2015 Apertura
Peru	2017 Torneo Descentralizado	Alianza Lima	Real Garcilaso	24	2006
Uruguay	2017 Uruguayan Primera División	Peñarol	Defensor Sporting	49	2015–16
Venezuela	2017 Venezuelan Primera División	Monagas	Deportivo Lara	1	–

=== OFC ===
Nation	Tournament	Champion	Second place	Title	Last honor
Fiji	2017 Fiji National Football League	Lautoka	Ba	4	2009
New Zealand	2016–17 New Zealand Football Championship	Team Wellington	Auckland City	2	2015–16
Papua New Guinea	2017 PNG National Soccer League	Lae City Dwellers	Madang FC	2	2015

== Domestic cups ==
In all tables below, the "title" and "last honor" refer to each cup winner's record in that specific cup competition.

=== AFC ===
Nation	Tournament	Champion	Final score	Second place	Title	Last honor
Australia	2017 FFA Cup	Sydney FC	2–1 (aet)	Adelaide United	1	—
Bahrain	2016–17 Bahraini King's Cup	Manama	2–1	Al-Muharraq	1	—
Bahrain	2016–17 Bahraini FA Cup	Hidd	1–1 (8–7 p)	Malkiya	2	2014–15
China	2017 Chinese FA Cup	Shanghai Greenland Shenhua	3–3 (a)	Shanghai SIPG	4	1998
China	2017 Chinese FA Super Cup	Guangzhou Evergrande	1–0	Jiangsu Suning	3	2016
India	2016–17 Indian Federation Cup	Bengaluru FC	2–0	Mohun Bagan	2	2014–15
Indonesia	2017 Indonesia President's Cup	Arema	5–1	Pusamania Borneo	1	—
Iran	2016–17 Hazfi Cup	Naft Tehran	1–0	Tractor Sazi	1	—
Iran	2017 Iranian Super Cup	Persepolis	3–0	Naft Tehran	1	—
Iraq	2016–17 Iraq FA Cup	Al-Zawra'a	1–0	Naft Al-Wasat	15	1999–2000
Iraq	2017 Iraqi Super Cup	Al-Zawra'a	1–1 (3–0 p)	Al-Quwa Al-Jawiya	4	2000
Japan	2017 Emperor's Cup (Note: The Emperor's Cup final is traditionally held on 1 January of the next calendar year.)	Cerezo Osaka	2–1 (aet)	Yokohama F. Marinos	4 (Note: Includes three cups won under the club's original identity of Yanmar Diesel.)	1974
Japan	2017 J.League Cup	Cerezo Osaka	2–0	Kawasaki Frontale	1	—
Japan	2017 Japanese Super Cup	Kashima Antlers	3–2	Urawa Red Diamonds	6	2010
Jordan	2016–17 Jordan FA Cup	Al-Faisaly	1–1 (4–2 p)	Al-Jazeera	19	2014–15
Kuwait	2016–17 Kuwait Emir Cup	Al Kuwait	4–2	Kazma SC	12	2015–16
Kuwait	2016–17 Kuwait Crown Prince Cup	Al Kuwait	3–3 (4–2 p)	Al-Qadsia	6	2011
Malaysia	2017 Malaysia FA Cup	Kedah	3–2	Pahang	4	2008
Malaysia	2017 Malaysia Cup	Johor Darul Ta'zim F.C.	2–0	Kedah	1	–
Malaysia	2017 Sultan Haji Ahmad Shah Cup	Kedah	1–1 (5–4 p)	Johor Darul Ta'zim	3	1994
Myanmar	2017 General Aung San Shield	Shan United	2–1	Yangon United	1	–
Saudi Arabia	2017 King Cup	Al-Hilal	3–2	Al-Ahli	8	2015
Saudi Arabia	2016–17 Saudi Crown Prince Cup	Al-Ittihad	1–0	Al-Nassr	8	2003–04
Oman	2016–17 Sultan Qaboos Cup	Al-Suwaiq	2–0	Dhofar	3	2012
Oman	2016–17 Oman Professional League Cup	Al-Nahda	2–1	Al-Nasr	1	—
Qatar	2017 Emir of Qatar Cup	Al Sadd	2–1	Al Rayyan	16	2015
Qatar	2017 Qatar Cup	Al Sadd	2–1	El Jaish	6	2008
Singapore	2017 Singapore Cup	Albirex Niigata (S)	2–2 (3–1 p)	Global Cebu	3	2016
Syria	2017 Syrian Cup	Al-Wahda	2–1	Al-Karamah	7	2016
Thailand	2017 Thai FA Cup	Chiangrai United	4–2	Bangkok United	1	—
Thailand	2017 Thai League Cup	SCG Muangthong United	2–0	Chiangrai United	2	2016
Thailand	2017 Thailand Champions Cup	Muangthong United	5–0	Sukhothai	1	—
Tajikistan	2017 Tajik Cup	Khujand	2–0	Istiklol	4	2008
Tajikistan	2017 Tajik Super Cup	Khosilot Farkhor	2–1	Istiklol	1	—
United Arab Emirates	2016–17 UAE President's Cup	Al Wahda	3–0	Al-Nasr	2	1999–2000
United Arab Emirates	2017 UAE League Cup	Al Ahli	2–0	Al Shabab	3	2013–14
Vietnam	2017 Vietnamese Cup	Sông Lam Nghệ An	7–2	Becamex Bình Dương	3	2010
Vietnam	2017 Vietnamese Super Cup	Than Quảng Ninh	3–3 (4–2 p)	Hà Nội	1	—

=== UEFA ===
Nation	Tournament	Champion	Final score	Second place	Title	Last honor
Albania	2016–17 Albanian Cup	Tirana	3–1 (a.e.t.)	Skënderbeu Korçë	16	2011–12
Albania	2017 Albanian Supercup	Tirana	1–0	Kukësi	11	2012
Andorra	2017 Copa Constitució	UE Santa Coloma	1–0	FC Santa Coloma	3	2015–16
Armenia	2016–17 Armenian Cup	Shirak	3–0	Pyunik	2	2011–12
Austria	2016–17 Austrian Cup	Red Bull Salzburg	2–1	Rapid Wien	5	2015–16
Azerbaijan	2016–17 Azerbaijan Cup	Qarabağ	2–0	Gabala	6	2015–16
Belarus	2016–17 Belarusian Cup	Dinamo Brest	1–1 (10–9 p)	Shakhtyor Soligorsk	2	2006–07
Belarus	2017 Belarusian Super Cup	BATE Borisov	3–1	Torpedo-BelAZ Zhodino	7	2016
Belgium	2016–17 Belgian Cup	Zulte Waregem	3–3 (4–2 p)	Oostende	2	2005–06
Belgium	2017 Belgian Super Cup	Anderlecht	2–1	Zulte Waregem	2	2005–06
Bosnia and Herzegovina	2016–17 Bosnia and Herzegovina Football Cup	Široki Brijeg	1–1 (4–2 p)	Sarajevo	3	2012–13
Bulgaria	2016–17 Bulgarian Cup	Botev Plovdiv	2–1	Ludogorets Razgrad	3	1980–81
Bulgaria	2017 Bulgarian Supercup	Botev Plovdiv	1–1 (5–4 p)	Ludogorets Razgrad	1	—
Croatia	2016–17 Croatian Football Cup	Rijeka	3–1	Dinamo Zagreb	4	2013–14
Cyprus	2016–17 Cypriot Cup	Apollon Limassol	1–0	APOEL	9	2015–16
Czech Republic	2016–17 Czech Cup	Fastav Zlín	1–0	Opava	1	—
Denmark	2016–17 Danish Cup	Copenhagen	3–1	Brøndby	8	2015–16
England	2016–17 FA Cup	Arsenal	2–1	Chelsea	13	2014–15
England	2016–17 EFL Cup	Manchester United	3–2	Southampton	5	2009–10
England	2017 FA Community Shield	Arsenal	1–1 (4–1 p)	Chelsea	15	2015
Estonia	2016–17 Estonian Cup	Tallinn	2–0	Tartu Tammeka	1	—
Faroe Islands	2017 Faroe Islands Cup	NSÍ	1–0	B36	3	2002
Finland	2017 Finnish Cup	HJK Helsinki	1–0	SJK	13	2014
France	2016–17 Coupe de France	Paris Saint-Germain	1–0	Angers	11	2015–16
France	2016–17 Coupe de la Ligue	Paris Saint-Germain	4–1	Monaco	7	2015–16
France	2017 Trophée des Champions	Paris Saint-Germain	2–1	Monaco	7	2016
Germany	2016–17 DFB-Pokal	Borussia Dortmund	2–1	Eintracht Frankfurt	4	2011–12
Germany	2017 DFL-Supercup	Bayern Munich	2–2 (5–4 p)	Borussia Dortmund	4	2011–12
Gibraltar	2017 Rock Cup	Europa	3–0	Lincoln Red Imps	5	1951–52
Greece	2016–17 Greek Football Cup	PAOK	2–1	AEK Athens	5	2002–03
Iceland	2017 Icelandic Cup	ÍBV	1–0	FH	5	1998
Iceland	2017 Deildabikar	KR Reykjavík	4–0	Grindavík	7	2016
Israel	2016–17 Israel State Cup	Bnei Yehuda	0–0 (4–3 p)	Maccabi Tel Aviv	3	1980–81
Israel	2016–17 Toto Cup Al	Hapoel Be'er Sheva	4–1	Hapoel Ironi Kiryat Shmona	4	2015–16
Israel	2017 Israel Super Cup	Hapoel Be'er Sheva	4–2	Bnei Yehuda	3	2016
Italy	2016–17 Coppa Italia	Juventus	2–0	Lazio	12	2015–16
Italy	2017 Supercoppa Italiana	Lazio	3–2	Juventus	12	2015–16
Kazakhstan	2017 Kazakhstan Cup	Kairat	1–0	Atyrau	8	2015
Kosovo	2016–17 Kosovar Cup	KF Besa Pejë	1–1 (4–2 p)	KF Llapi	3	2010–11
Latvia	2016–17 Latvian Football Cup	Ventspils	2–2 (6–5 p)	Riga	7	2012–13
Latvia	2017 Latvian Football Cup	Liepāja	2–0	Riga FC	1	–
Liechtenstein	2016–17 Liechtenstein Cup	Vaduz	5–1	Eschen/Mauren	45	2015–16
Lithuania	2017 Lithuanian Football Cup	Stumbras	1–0	Žalgiris	1	–
Lithuania	2017 Lithuanian Supercup	Žalgiris	1–0	Trakai	6	2016
Luxembourg	2016–17 Luxembourg Cup	Dudelange	4–1	Fola Esch	7	2015–16
(North Macedonia) Macedonia	2016–17 Macedonian Football Cup	Pelister	0–0 (4–3 p)	Shkëndija	2	2000–01
Malta	2016–17 Maltese FA Trophy	Floriana	2–0	Sliema Wanderers	20	2010–11
Moldova	2016–17 Moldovan Cup	Sheriff Tiraspol	5–0	Zaria Bălți	9	2014–15
Montenegro	2016–17 Montenegrin Cup	Sutjeska	1–0	Grbalj	1	—
Netherlands	2016–17 KNVB Cup	Vitesse	2–0	AZ Alkmaar	1	—
Netherlands	2017 Johan Cruyff Shield	Feyenoord	4–2	Vitesse	3	1999
Northern Ireland	2016–17 Irish Cup	Linfield	3–0	Coleraine	43	2011–12
Northern Ireland	2016–17 NIFL Cup	Ballymena United	2–1	Carrick Rangers	1	—
Norway	2017 Norwegian Football Cup	Lillestrøm	3–2	Sarpsborg 08	6	2007
Norway	2017 Mesterfinalen	Rosenborg	2–0	Brann	1	—
Poland	2016–17 Polish Cup	Arka Gdynia	2–1 (a.e.t.)	Lech Poznań	2	1978–79
Portugal	2016–17 Taça de Portugal	Benfica	2–1	Vitória de Guimarães	29	2013–14
Portugal	2016–17 Taça da Liga	Moreirense	1–0	Braga	1	—
(Republic of Ireland) Ireland	2017 FAI Cup	Cork City	1–1 (5–3 p)	Dundalk	4	2016
(Republic of Ireland) Ireland	2017 League of Ireland Cup	Dundalk	3–0	Shamrock Rovers	6	2014
(Republic of Ireland) Ireland	2017 President of Ireland's Cup	Cork City	3–0	Dundalk	2	2016
Romania	2016–17 Cupa României	Voluntari	1–1 (5–3 p)	Astra Giurgiu	1	—
Romania	2016–17 Cupa Ligii	Dinamo București	2–0	Poli Timișoara	1	—
Russia	2016–17 Russian Cup	Lokomotiv Moscow	2–0	Ural Yekaterinburg	9	2014–15
San Marino	2016–17 Coppa Titano	Tre Penne	2–1	La Fiorita	6	1999–2000
Scotland	2016–17 Scottish Cup	Celtic	2–1	Aberdeen	37	2012–13
Scotland	2016–17 Scottish League Cup	Celtic	3–0	Aberdeen	16	2014–15
Serbia	2016–17 Serbian Cup	Partizan	1–0	Red Star	5	2015–16
Slovakia	2016–17 Slovak Cup	Slovan Bratislava	3–0	MFK Skalica	14	2012–13
Slovenia	2016–17 Slovenian Football Cup	Domžale	1–0	Olimpija	2	2010–11
Spain	2016–17 Copa del Rey	Barcelona	3–1	Alavés	29	2015–16
Sweden	2016–17 Svenska Cupen	Östersunds FK	4–1	IFK Norrköping	1	—
Switzerland	2016–17 Swiss Cup	Basel	3–0	Sion	12	2011–12
Turkey	2016–17 Turkish Cup	Konyaspor	0–0 (4–1 p)	İstanbul Başakşehir	1	—
Ukraine	2016–17 Ukrainian Cup	Shakhtar Donetsk	1–0	Dynamo Kyiv	11	2015–16
Wales	2016–17 Welsh Cup	Bala Town	2–1	The New Saints	1	—
Wales	2016–17 Welsh League Cup	The New Saints	4–0	Barry Town United	8	2015–16

=== CAF ===
Nation	Tournament	Champion	Final score	Second place	Title	Last honor
Angola	2017 Angola Super Cup	1º de Agosto	1–0	Recreativo Libolo	8	2010
Algeria	2016–17 Algerian Cup	CR Belouizdad	1–0	ES Sétif	7	2009
Egypt	2016–17 Egypt Cup	Al Ahly	2–1	Al-Masry SC	36	2006–07
Morocco	2017 Coupe du Trône	Raja Casablanca	1–1 (3–1 p)	Difaâ Hassani El Jadidi	8	2012
South Africa	2016–17 Nedbank Cup	SuperSport United	4–1	Orlando Pirates	5	2015–16
Tunisia	2016–17 Tunisian Cup	Club Africain	1–0	US Ben Guerdane	12	1999–2000

=== CONCACAF ===
Nation	Tournament	Champion	Final score	Second place	Title	Last honor
Canada	2017 Canadian Championship	Toronto FC	3–2	Montreal Impact	6	2016
El Salvador	2016–17 Copa El Salvador	Santa Tecla	1–0	C.D. FAS	1	–
Honduras	2017 Honduran Cup	Marathón	3–0	Gimnástico	2	1994
Mexico	Clausura 2017 Copa MX	Guadalajara	0–0 (3–1 p)	Morelia	4	2015
Mexico	Apertura 2017 Copa MX	Monterrey	1–0	Pachuca	2	1992
United States	2017 Lamar Hunt U.S. Open Cup	Sporting Kansas City	2–1	New York Red Bulls	4	2015

=== CONMEBOL ===
Nation	Tournament	Champion	Final score	Second place	Title	Last honor
Argentina	2016–17 Copa Argentina	River Plate	2–1	Atlético Tucumán	2	2016
Argentina	2017 Supercopa Argentina	River Plate	2–0	Boca Juniors	1st	—
Brazil	2017 Copa do Brasil	Cruzeiro	0–0 (5–3 p)	Flamengo	5	2003
Chile	2017 Copa Chile	Santiago Wanderers	3–1	Universidad de Chile	3	1961
Colombia	2017 Copa Colombia	Junior	3–1	Independiente Medellín	2	2015
Venezuela	2017 Copa Venezuela	Mineros	5–4	Zamora	3	2011

== Women's leagues ==
=== UEFA ===
Nation	Tournament	Champion	Second place	Title	Last honor
Austria	2016–17 ÖFB-Frauenliga	SKN St. Pölten	Neulengbach	3 (Note: Includes two titles won under the club's former identity of FSK St. Pölten-Spratzern.)	2015–16
Belgium	2016–17 Super League	Standard Liège	RSC Anderlecht	2	2015–16
Croatia	2016–17 Croatian Women's First Football League	Osijek	Agram	21	2015–16
Cyprus	2016–17 Cypriot First Division	Apollon Ladies	Lefkothea Nicosia	9	2015–16
Czech Republic	2016–17 Czech First Division	Slavia Prague	Sparta Prague	6	2015–16
Denmark	2016–17 Elitedivisionen	Brøndby	Fortuna Hjørring	10	2012–13
England	2017 FA WSL Spring Series	Chelsea	Manchester City	2	2015
France	2016–17 Division 1 Féminine	Lyon	Montpellier	15	2015–16
Germany	2016–17 Frauen-Bundesliga	Wolfsburg	Bayern Munich	3	2013–14
Iceland	2017 Úrvalsdeild	Þór/KA	Breiðablik	2	2012
(Republic of Ireland) Ireland	2017 Women's National League	Wexford Youths	Peamount United	3	2015-16
Israel	2016–17 Ligat Nashim	Kiryat Gat	Ramat HaSharon	1	—
Italy	2016–17 Serie A	Fiorentina	Brescia	1	—
Netherlands	2016–17 Eredivisie	Ajax	Twente	1	—
Norway	2017 Toppserien	LSK Kvinner	Avaldsnes	5	2016
Portugal	2016–17 Campeonato Nacional	Sporting CP	SC Braga	1	—
Romania	2016-17 Superliga	Olimpia Cluj	Navobi Iași	7	2015–16
Russia	2017 Championship	Zvezda	Ryazan	6	2015
Scotland	2017 Premier League	Glasgow City	Hibernian	12	2016
Slovenia	2016–17 Slovenian Women's League	Olimpija Ljubljana	Pomurje Beltinci	1	—
Spain	2016–17 Primera División	Atlético Madrid	FC Barcelona	2	1989–90
Sweden	2017 Damallsvenskan	Linköpings	Rosengård	3	2016
Wales	2016–17 Welsh Premier League	Swansea City	Cardiff	3	2010-11

Notes

- England is not holding an official women's championship in 2017. The FA is returning top-flight women's football to the autumn-to-spring season that had prevailed prior to the establishment of the WSL, which started play in 2011 under a spring-to-autumn format. To that effect, a one-off FA WSL Spring Series will be held in spring 2017.

=== AFC ===
Nation	Tournament	Champion	Second place	Title	Last honor
Australia	2016–17 W-League	Melbourne City	Perth Glory	2	2015–16
Japan	2017 Nadeshiko League Division 1	NTV Beleza	INAC Kobe Leonessa	15	2016
Philippines	2016–17 PFF Women's League (Note: Inaugural season for the Philippine women's league.)	De La Salle University	University of Santo Tomas	1	—

=== CONCACAF ===
Nation	Tournament	Champion	Second place	Title	Last honor
Mexico	2017 Liga MX Femenil Apertura (Note: Inaugural season for the Mexican women's league.)	Guadalajara	Pachuca	1	—
United States	2017 NWSL	Portland Thorns FC	North Carolina Courage	2	2013

=== CONMEBOL ===
Nation	Tournament	Champion	Second place	Title	Last honor
Brazil	2017 Campeonato Brasileiro de Futebol Feminino Série A1	Santos	Corinthians	1st	—

== Women's cups ==
=== UEFA ===
Nation	Tournament	Champion	Final score	Second place	Title	Last honor
England	2016–17 FA Women's Cup	Manchester City	4–1	Birmingham City	1	—
Germany	2016–17 Frauen-DFB-Pokal	VfL Wolfsburg	2–1	SC Sand	4	2015–16
Slovenia	2016–17 Slovenian Women's Cup	Pomurje Beltinci	6–0	Rudar Škale	7	2015–16

== Second, third, fourth, and fifth leagues ==
=== CONCACAF ===
Nation	League	Champion	Final score	Second place	Title	Last honour
Canada	2017 Première Ligue de soccer du Québec	A.S. Blainville		Dynamo de Quebec	1st	
Canada	2017 Canadian Soccer League	York Region Shooters	1–1 (a.e.t.) (5–4 p)	Scarborough SC	3rd	2014

== Detailed results ==
=== FIFA ===
- May 20 – June 11: 2017 FIFA U-20 World Cup in South Korea
  - England defeated Venezuela, 1–0, to win their first FIFA U-20 World Cup title. Italy took third place.
- June 17 – July 2: 2017 FIFA Confederations Cup in Russia
  - Germany defeated Chile, 1–0, to win their first FIFA Confederations Cup title. Portugal took third place.
- October 6 – 28: 2017 FIFA U-17 World Cup in India
  - England defeated Spain, 5–2, to win their first FIFA U-17 World Cup title. Brazil took third place.
- December 6 – 16: 2017 FIFA Club World Cup in the United Arab Emirates
  - (Spain) Real Madrid defeated (Brazil) Grêmio, 1–0, to win their second consecutive and third overall FIFA Club World Cup title.
  - (Mexico) Pachuca took third place.

=== Europe (UEFA) ===
==== Nations ====
Men's events:

- May 3 – 19: 2017 UEFA European Under-17 Championship in Croatia
  - Spain defeated England, 4–1 in penalties and after a 2–2 score in regular play, to win their ninth UEFA European Under-17 Championship title.
- June 16 – 30: 2017 UEFA European Under-21 Championship in Poland
  - Germany defeated Spain, 1–0, to win their second UEFA European Under-21 Championship title.
- July 2 – 15: 2017 UEFA European Under-19 Championship in Georgia
  - England defeated Portugal, 2–1, to win their tenth UEFA European Under-19 Championship title.

Women's events:

- May 2 – 14: 2017 UEFA Women's Under-17 Championship in the Czech Republic
  - Germany defeated Spain, 3–1 in penalties and after a 0–0 score in regular play, to win their second consecutive and sixth overall UEFA Women's Under-17 Championship title.
- July 16 – August 6: UEFA Women's Euro 2017 in the Netherlands
  - The Netherlands defeated Denmark, 4–2, to win their first UEFA Women's Euro title.
- August 8 – 20: 2017 UEFA Women's Under-19 Championship in Northern Ireland
  - Spain defeated France, 3–2, to win their second UEFA Women's Under-19 Championship title.

University event:

- July 23 – 30: 2017 European Universities Football Championships in (Portugal) Porto
  - Men: (Russia) Kuban State University defeated (France) University of Lille, 2–1, in the final.
    - (France) University of Bordeaux took third place.
  - Women: (France) University of Montpellier defeated (Spain) University of Valencia, 7–1, in the final.
    - (France) Paul Sabatier University took third place.

==== Clubs ====
Men's events:

- September 13, 2016 – June 3, 2017: 2016–17 UEFA Champions League (final in (Wales) Cardiff)
  - (Spain) Real Madrid C.F. defeated (Italy) Juventus FC, 4–1, to win their second consecutive and 12th overall UEFA Champions League title and the first football team to do this since the new updated form of the UEFA Champions League.
  - Note: Real Madrid would represent UEFA at the 2017 FIFA Club World Cup.
- September 15, 2016 – May 24, 2017: 2016–17 UEFA Europa League (final in (Sweden) Stockholm)
  - (England) Manchester United F.C. defeated (Netherlands) AFC Ajax, 2–0, to win their first UEFA Europa League title.
- July 1 – 9: 2017 UEFA Regions' Cup Final Tournament in (Turkey) Istanbul
  - (Croatia) Nogometno središte Zagreb defeated (Republic of Ireland) Munster/Connacht, 1–0, to win their first UEFA Regions' Cup title.
- July 18 – 30: 2017 International Champions Cup in China, Singapore, and the United States
  - Singapore -> Champions: (Italy) Internazionale; Second: (Germany) FC Bayern Munich; Third: (England) Chelsea F.C.
- August 8: 2017 UEFA Super Cup in (North Macedonia) Skopje
  - (Spain) Real Madrid C.F. defeated (England) Manchester United F.C., 2–1, to win their fourth UEFA Super Cup title.

Women's events:

- October 5, 2016 – June 1, 2017: 2016–17 UEFA Women's Champions League (final in (Wales) Cardiff)
  - (France) Lyon defeated fellow French team Paris Saint-Germain in the final 7–6 on penalties, following a 0–0 score at the end of extra time. Lyon won their second consecutive and fourth overall UEFA Women's Champions League title.

Youth events:

- September 13, 2016 – April 24, 2017: 2016–17 UEFA Youth League (final in (Switzerland) Nyon)
  - (Austria) FC Red Bull Salzburg defeated (Portugal) Benfica, 2–1, to win their first UEFA Youth League title.

=== North, Central America & Caribbean (CONCACAF) ===
- August 2, 2016 – April 26, 2017: 2016–17 CONCACAF Champions League
  - (Mexico) C.F. Pachuca defeated fellow Mexican team, Tigres UANL, 2–1 on aggregate, to win their fifth CONCACAF Champions League title.
  - Note: Pachuca would represent CONCACAF at the 2017 FIFA Club World Cup.
- January 13 – 22: 2017 Copa Centroamericana in Panama
  - Honduras won the round-robin competition with four wins and one draw, in order to win their fourth Copa Centroamericana title.
  - Note: Along with Honduras, Panama, El Salvador, and Costa Rica all qualified to compete at the 2017 CONCACAF Gold Cup.
- February 17 – March 5: 2017 CONCACAF U-20 Championship in Costa Rica
  - United States defeated Honduras, 5–3 in penalties and after a 0–0 score in regular play, to win their first CONCACAF U-20 Championship title.
  - Note: Along with the two teams mentioned here, Mexico, and Costa Rica all qualified to compete at the 2017 FIFA U-20 World Cup.
- April 21 – May 7: 2017 CONCACAF U-17 Championship in Panama
  - Mexico defeated the United States, 5–4 in penalties and after a 1–1 score in regular play, to win their seventh CONCACAF U-17 Championship title.
  - Note: Along with the two teams mentioned here, Costa Rica and Honduras all qualified to compete at the 2017 FIFA U-17 World Cup.
- June 22 & 25: 2017 Caribbean Cup in (France) Martinique
  - Curaçao defeated Jamaica, 2–1, to win their first Caribbean Cup title.
  - French Guiana took third place.
- July 7 – 26: 2017 CONCACAF Gold Cup in the United States
  - The United States defeated Jamaica, 2–1, to win their sixth CONCACAF Gold Cup title.

=== South America (CONMEBOL) ===
- January 18 – February 11: 2017 South American Youth Football Championship in Ecuador
  - Champions: Uruguay; Second: Ecuador; Third: Venezuela; Fourth: Argentina
  - Note: All the teams mentioned above all qualify to compete in the 2017 FIFA U-20 World Cup.
- January 23 – November 29: 2017 Copa Libertadores
  - (Brazil) Grêmio defeated (Argentina) Lanús, 3–1 on aggregate, to win their third Copa Libertadores title.
  - Note: Grêmio would represent CONMEBOL at the 2017 FIFA Club World Cup.
- February 23 – March 19: 2017 South American Under-17 Football Championship in Chile
  - Champions: Brazil; Second: Chile; Third: Paraguay; Fourth: Colombia
  - Note: All the teams mentioned above all qualify to compete in the 2017 FIFA U-17 World Cup.
- February 28 – December 13: 2017 Copa Sudamericana
  - (Argentina) Independiente defeated (Brazil) Flamengo, 3–2 on aggregate, to win their second Copa Sudamericana title.
- April 4 & May 10: 2017 Recopa Sudamericana
  - (Colombia) Atlético Nacional defeated (Brazil) Chapecoense, 5–3 on aggregate, to win their first Recopa Sudamericana title.
- August 15: 2017 Suruga Bank Championship in (Japan) Saitama
  - (Japan) Urawa Red Diamonds defeated (Brazil) Chapecoense, 1–0, to win their first Suruga Bank Championship title.
- October 7 – 21: 2017 Copa Libertadores Femenina in Paraguay
  - (Brazil) Corinthians–Audax defeated (Chile) Colo-Colo, 5–4 in penalties and after a 0–0 score in regular play, to win their first Copa Libertadores Femenina title.
  - (Argentina) River Plate took third place.
- November 4 – 19: 2017 South American Under-15 Football Championship in Argentina
  - Argentina defeated Brazil, 3–2, to win their first South American Under-15 Football Championship title.

=== Africa (CAF) ===
- January 14 – February 5: 2017 Africa Cup of Nations in Gabon
  - Cameroon defeated Egypt, 2–1, to win their fifth Africa Cup of Nations title. Burkina Faso took third place.
  - Note: Cameroon has qualified to compete at the 2017 FIFA Confederations Cup.
- February 10 – November 4: 2017 CAF Champions League
  - (Morocco) Wydad Casablanca defeated (Egypt) Al Ahly, to win their second CAF Champions League title.
  - Note: Wydad Casablanca would represent the CAF at the 2017 FIFA Club World Cup.
- February 10 – November 25: 2017 CAF Confederation Cup
  - (Democratic Republic of the Congo) TP Mazembe defeated (South Africa) SuperSport United F.C., 2–1 on aggregate, to win their second consecutive CAF Confederation Cup title.
- February 18: 2017 CAF Super Cup
  - (South Africa) Mamelodi Sundowns F.C. defeated (Democratic Republic of the Congo) TP Mazembe, 1–0, to win their first CAF Super Cup title.
- February 26 – March 12: 2017 Africa U-20 Cup of Nations in Zambia
  - Zambia defeated Senegal, 2–0, to win their first Africa U-20 Cup of Nations title. Guinea took third place.
  - Note: Along with the three teams mentioned above, South Africa have qualified to compete at the 2017 FIFA U-20 World Cup.
- May 14 – 28: 2017 Africa U-17 Cup of Nations in Gabon
  - Mali defeated Ghana, 1–0, to win their second consecutive Africa U-17 Cup of Nations title.
  - Guinea took third place.
  - Note: Along with the three teams mentioned above and Niger, all four of them qualified to compete at the 2017 FIFA U-17 World Cup.
- June 25 – July 9: 2017 COSAFA Cup in (South Africa) Moruleng and Phokeng
  - Zimbabwe defeated Zambia, 3–1, to win their fifth COSAFA Cup title.
  - Tanzania took third place.
- September 9 – 24: 2017 WAFU Cup of Nations in Ghana
  - Ghana defeated Nigeria, 4–1, to win their second consecutive WAFU Cup of Nations title.
  - Niger took third place.
- December 3 – 17: 2017 CECAFA Cup in Kenya
  - Kenya defeated Zanzibar, 3–2 in penalties and after a 2–2 score in regular play, to win their seventh CECAFA Cup title.
  - Uganda took third place.
- December 6 – 16: 2017 COSAFA U-20 Cup in Zambia
  - South Africa defeated Lesotho, 2–1, to win their seventh COSAFA U-20 Cup title.
  - Egypt took third place.
- July 21, 2017 – January 28, 2018: 2018 African U-20 Women's World Cup Qualifying Tournament

=== Asia (AFC) ===
- January 24 – November 4: 2017 AFC Cup
  - (Iraq) Al-Quwa Al-Jawiya defeated (Tajikistan) Istiklol, 1–0, to win their second consecutive AFC Cup title.
- January 24 – November 25: 2017 AFC Champions League
  - (Japan) Urawa Red Diamonds defeated (Saudi Arabia) Al-Hilal FC, 2–1 on aggregate, to win their second AFC Champions League title.
  - Note: Urawa Red Diamonds would represent the AFC at the 2017 FIFA Club World Cup.
- July 9 – 22: 2017 AFF U-15 Youth Championship in Thailand
  - Vietnam defeated Thailand, 4–2 in penalties and after a 0–0 score in regular play, to win their third AFF U-15 Youth Championship title.
  - Australia took third place.
- September 4 – 17: 2017 AFF U-18 Youth Championship in (Myanmar) Yangon
  - Thailand defeated Malaysia, 2–0, to win their fifth AFF U-19 Youth Championship title.
  - Indonesia took third place.
- September 9 – 23: 2017 AFC U-16 Women's Championship in Thailand
  - North Korea defeated South Korea, 2–0, to win their second consecutive and third overall AFC U-16 Women's Championship title.
  - Japan took third place.
  - Note: All three teams here have qualified to compete at the 2018 FIFA U-17 Women's World Cup.
- October 14 – 28: 2017 AFC U-19 Women's Championship in China
  - Japan defeated North Korea, 1–0, to win their second consecutive and fifth overall AFC U-19 Women's Championship title.
  - China took third place.
- December 8 – 16: 2017 EAFF E-1 Football Championship for Men and Women in Japan
  - Men: South Korea defeated Japan, 4–1, to win their fourth men's EAFF E-1 Football Championship title.
    - China took third place.
  - Women: North Korea defeated Japan, 2–0, to win their third consecutive women's EAFF E-1 Football Championship title.
    - China took third place.
- December 22, 2017 – January 8, 2018: 23rd Arabian Gulf Cup in Kuwait

=== Oceania (OFC) ===
- February 11 – 24: 2017 OFC U-17 Championship in Tahiti
  - New Zealand defeated New Caledonia, 7–0, to win their sixth consecutive and seventh overall OFC U-17 Championship title.
  - Note: The two teams mentioned above have qualified to compete at the 2017 FIFA U-17 World Cup.
- February 25 – May 7: 2017 OFC Champions League
  - Auckland City FC defeated fellow New Zealand team, Team Wellington, 5–0 on aggregate, to win their seventh consecutive and ninth overall OFC Champions League title.
  - Note: Auckland City would represent the OFC at the 2017 FIFA Club World Cup.
- July 11 – 24: 2017 OFC U-19 Women's Championship in New Zealand
  - Champions: New Zealand; Second: Fiji; Third: Papua New Guinea
  - Note: New Zealand has qualified to compete at the 2018 FIFA U-20 Women's World Cup.
- August 4 – 18: 2017 OFC U-16 Women's Championship in (Samoa) Apia
  - New Zealand defeated New Caledonia, 6–0, to win their fourth consecutive OFC U-16 Women's Championship title.
  - Note: New Zealand has qualified to compete at the 2018 FIFA U-17 Women's World Cup.

== Futsal ==
=== AFC ===
- May 16 – 26: 2017 AFC U-20 Futsal Championship in Bangkok
  - In the final, Iran defeated Iraq, 2–0, to win their 1st AFC U-20 Futsal Championship. Thailand took third place.
- July 3 – 9: 2017 AFF Futsal Club Championship in (Thailand) Bangkok
  - In the final, (Thailand) Thai Port defeated (Vietnam) Sanna Khanh Hoa, 4–0, to win their 3rd title. (Malaysia) Melaka United took third place.
- July 20 – 30: 2017 AFC Futsal Club Championship in (Vietnam) Ho Chi Minh City
  - In the final, (Thailand) Chonburi Bluewave defeated (Iran) Giti Pasand Isfahan, 3–2, to win their 2nd title. (Vietnam) Thái Sơn Nam took third place.
- October 23 – November 3: 2017 AFF Futsal Championship in (Vietnam) Ho Chi Minh City

=== CONCACAF ===
- August 21 – 26: 2017 CONCACAF Futsal Club Championship in (Honduras) Tegucigalpa
  - In the final, (Costa Rica) Grupo Line Futsal defeated (United States) Elite Futsal, 5–4, to win their 1st CONCACAF Futsal Club Championship. (El Salvador) Soyapango F.C. took third place.

=== CONMEBOL ===
- April 5 – 12: 2017 Copa América de Futsal in San Juan
  - In the final, Brazil defeated Argentina, 4–2, after (a.e.t.), to win their 10th Copa América de Futsal. Paraguay took third place.
- May 22 – 28: 2017 Copa Libertadores de Futsal in (Peru) Lima
  - In the final, (Brazil) Carlos Barbosa defeated (Paraguay) Cerro Porteño, 2–1, to win their 5th Copa Libertadores de Futsal. (Colombia) Bello Real Antioquia took third place.
- July 15 – 22: 3rd CONMEBOL Women Futsal Club Championships in (Paraguay) Asunción
  - In the final, (Brazil) Associação Unochapecó/Female Futsal defeated (Paraguay) Club Sport Colonial, 4–2, to win their 2nd CONMEBOL Women Futsal Club Championships. (Venezuela) Trujillanos FC took third place.
- August 16 – 20: 2017 Liga Sudamericana de Futsal (South zone) in Buenos Aires
  - U19: Round Robin: 1st: Argentina, 2nd: Uruguay, 3rd: Paraguay, 4th: Bolivia, 5th: Chile
  - Seniors: Round Robin: 1st: Argentina, 2nd: Paraguay, 3rd: Uruguay, 4th: Chile, 5th: Bolivia

=== UEFA ===
- April 28 – 30: 2016–17 UEFA Futsal Cup (final four) in (Kazakhstan) Almaty
  - In the final, (Spain) Inter FS defeated (Portugal) Sporting CP, 7–0, to win their 4th UEFA Futsal Cup. (Kazakhstan) AFC Kairat took third place.

=== EUSA ===
- July 10 – 17: 11th European Universities Futsal Championship in (Turkey) Çorum
  - Men's: (Portugal) University of Beira Interior defeated (Georgia (country)) Tbilisi State University, 5–4. (Portugal) University of Porto took third place.
  - Women's: League system: 1st.: (Russia) Moscow Polytechnic University, 2nd: (Croatia) University of Zagreb, 3rd: (Germany) University of Münster

== Beach soccer ==
=== International beach soccer events ===
- January 9 – 15: 2016 Copa Libertadores de Beach Soccer in (Brazil) Santos, São Paulo (debut event)
  - (Brazil) CR Vasco da Gama defeated (Argentina) Club Atlético Rosario Central, 8–1, in the final.
  - (Chile) Deportes Iquique took third place.
- February 5 – 12: 2017 CONMEBOL Beach Soccer Championship in Asunción
  - Brazil defeated Paraguay, 7–5, in the final. Ecuador took third place.
  - Note: All these teams mentioned above all qualify to compete at the 2017 FIFA Beach Soccer World Cup.
- February 13 – 16: Thailand 5s Beach Soccer Championship 2017 in Bangkok
  - Japan defeated Hungary, 6–3, in the final. Malaysia took third place.
- February 14 – 16: Persian Beach Soccer Cup 2017 in Bushehr
  - Champions: Iran; Second: Ukraine; Third: Italy
- February 20 – 26: 2017 CONCACAF Beach Soccer Championship in (The Bahamas) Nassau
  - Panama defeated Mexico, 4–2, in the final. El Salvador took third place.
- March 4 – 11: 2017 AFC Beach Soccer Championship in (Malaysia) Kuala Terengganu
  - Iran defeated United Arab Emirates, 7–2, in the final. Japan took third place.
- March 27 – 29: Eurasia Beach Soccer Cup 2017 in (Iran) Yazd
  - Champions: (Iran) Moghaevmate Golsapoosh; Second: (Russia) Lokomotiv Moscow; Third: Sporting Clube de Portugal
- April 13 – 15: Copa Pílsener Fútbol Playa El Salvador 2017 at the Salvadoran Costa del Sol
  - Champions: Tahiti; Second: Panama; Third: El Salvador; Fourth: Ecuador
- April 21 – 23: 2017 Tulip Festival Beach Soccer Tournament in Istanbul (debut event)
  - Champions: Belarus; Second: England; Third: Turkey; Fourth: Czech Republic
- April 27 – May 7: 2017 FIFA Beach Soccer World Cup in (The Bahamas) Nassau
  - Brazil defeated Tahiti, 6–0, to win their 14th FIFA Beach Soccer World Cup title.
  - Iran took third place.
- May 19 – 21: Sal Beach Soccer Cup 2017 in Sal, Cape Verde
  - Champions: Portugal; Second: England; Third: Germany; Fourth: Cape Verde
- May 19 – 21: Beach Soccer USA Cup 2017 in (United States) Oceanside, California
  - Champions: (Brazil) Fortaleza Esporte Clube; Runner-Up: (Brazil) Botafogo
- May 29 – June 4: Euro Winners Cup 2017 for Men and Women in Nazaré, Portugal
  - Men: (Portugal) S.C. Braga defeated (Ukraine) Artur Music, 8–5, in the final. (Russia) Lokomotiv Moscow took third place.
  - Women: (Switzerland) BSC Havana Shots Aargau defeated (United Kingdom) Portsmouth Ladies BSC, 4–3, in the final. (Spain) Higicontrol Melilla took third place.
- June 9 – 11: NASSC - US Open 2017 in (United States) Virginia Beach, Virginia
  - (Spain) FC Barcelona defeated (United States) Gobeachsoccer, 6–1, in the final. (United States) Great Lakes BSC took third place.
- June 16 – 18: Talent Beach Soccer Tournament Siófok 2017 in Hungary
  - Hungary defeated France, 13–4, in the final. Spain took third place.
- June 30 – July 2: Friendship Cup 2017 in Vitebsk
  - Champions: Belarus; Second: Turkey; Third: Azerbaijan; Fourth: Lithuania
- July 14 – 16: Morocco Beach Soccer Cup 2017 in Casablanca
  - Champions: Switzerland; Second: Morocco; Third: England; Fourth: Netherlands
- July 15 & 16: Nations Cup 2017 - Linz in Austria
  - Hungary defeated Austria, 6–2, in the final. The Czech Republic took third place.
- July 19 – 22: Commonwealth Youth Games - Beach Soccer in (The Bahamas) Nassau, Bahamas
  - Men: (gold) Saint Lucia; (silver) Trinidad and Tobago; (bronze) Bahamas
  - Women: (gold) Trinidad and Tobago; (silver) Jamaica; (bronze) Turks and Caicos Islands
- July 21 – 23: BSWW Mundialito Cascais 2017 in Portugal
  - Champions: Brazil; Second: Portugal; Third: Russia; Fourth: France
- September 12 – 23: Liga Sudamericana Fútbol Playa CONMEBOL 2017 in (Peru) Pimentel District & Asunción (debut event)
  - Group winners: Brazil (North) and Paraguay (South)
  - U20 winners: Brazil (North) and Argentina (South)
- October 20 – 22: BSWW Tour - Visit Puerto Vallarta Cup 2017 in Mexico
  - Champions: Mexico; Second: United States; Third: France; Fourth: Colombia
- October 31 – November 4: Intercontinental Beach Soccer Cup Dubai 2017 in the United Arab Emirates
  - Champions: Brazil; Second: Portugal; Third: Iran
- November 4: Beach Soccer Stars 2017 in (United Arab Emirates) Dubai
  - For the list of winners, click here.
- November 11 – 19: 2017 Copa Libertadores de Beach Soccer in (Paraguay) Lambaré
  - (Brazil) CR Vasco da Gama defeated (Uruguay) Club Malvín, 8–5, in the final.
  - (Paraguay) Universidad Autónoma de Asunción took third place.
- December 3 – 10: 2017 CONMEBOL Campeonato Sudamericano Sub-20 Futbol Playa in Uruguay
  - Champions: Brazil; Second: Argentina; Third: Paraguay; Fourth: Colombia
- December 8 – 10: BSWW Tour - Copa Lagos 2017 in Nigeria
  - Division A Champions: Spain; Second: Nigeria; Third: Morocco; Fourth: Lebanon
  - Division B Champions: (England) Arsenal BSC; Second: (Nigeria) Kebbi BSC; Third: (Nigeria) Gidi Sharks; Fourth: (Nigeria) Pepsi Football Academy
- December 14 – 17: Mundialito de Clubes 2017 in (Brazil) Vargem Grande Paulista
  - (Russia) BSC Lokomotiv Moscow defeated (Iran) Pars Jonoubi, 5–4, in the final.
  - (Brazil) SC Corinthians Paulista took third place.

=== 2017 Euro Beach Soccer League ===
- June 23 – 25: EBSL #1 in Belgrade
  - Division "A" Champions: Spain; Second: France; Third: Russia; Fourth: Germany
  - Division "B" Champions: Estonia; Second: Serbia; Third: Norway; Fourth: Czech Republic
- July 7 – 9: EBSL #2 in Nazaré
  - Men's Division A Champions: Spain (Group 1); Portugal (Group 2)
  - Women's Champions: England defeated Switzerland, 4–3, in the final. The Netherlands took third place.
- July 28 – 30: EBSL #3 in Moscow
  - Division "A" Champions: Russia; Second: Belarus; Third: Switzerland; Fourth: Greece
  - Division "B" Champions: Turkey; Second: Moldova; Third: Kazakhstan
- August 11 – 13: EBSL #4 in Siófok
  - Division "A" Champions: Portugal; Second: Belarus; Third: Poland; Fourth: Azerbaijan
  - Division "B" Champions: Hungary; Second: Bulgaria; Third: Denmark; Fourth: Andorra
- August 25 – 27: EBSL #5 in Warnemünde
  - Division "A" Champions: Ukraine; Second: Italy; Third: Azerbaijan; Fourth: Germany
  - Division "B" Champions: England; Second: Romania; Third: Lithuania; Fourth: Netherlands
- September 14 – 17: 2017 EBSL Superfinal and Promotion Final in Terracina
  - Superfinal: Russia defeated Portugal, 3–1, to win their fifth Euro Beach Soccer League title.
    - Italy took third place.
  - Promotional final: Turkey defeated Estonia, 4–2, to be promoted to the EBSL's Division A.
    - Hungary took third place.

== Deaths ==
=== January ===
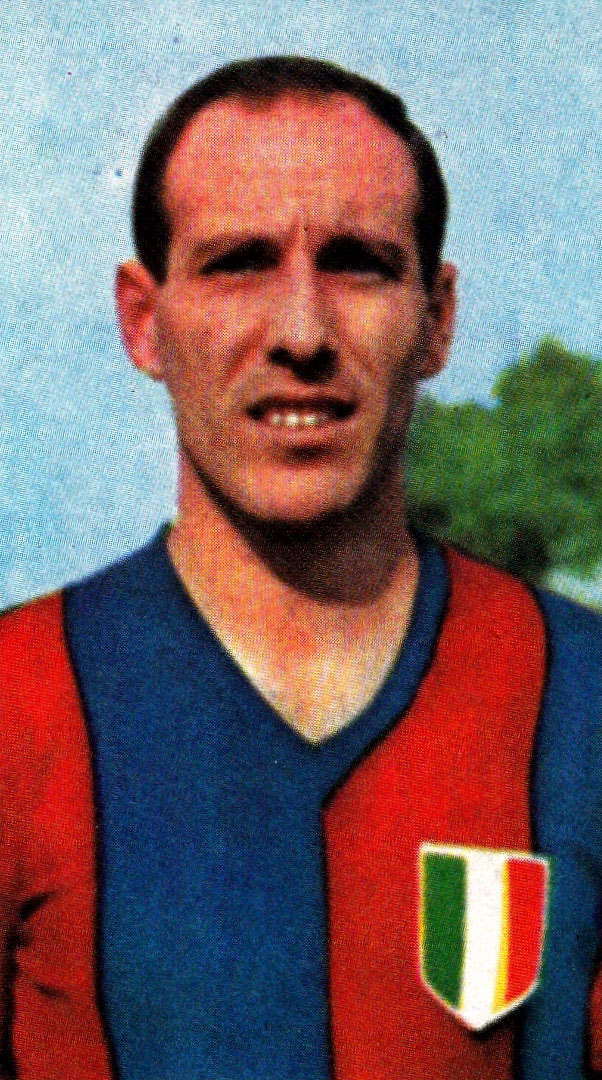
Ezio Pascutti

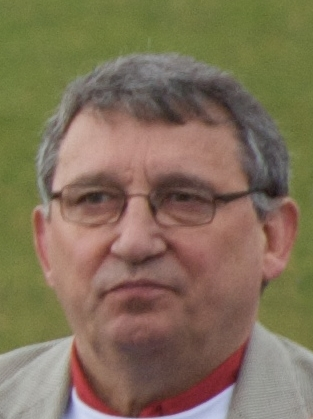
Graham Taylor

- 1 January – Moruca, Spanish footballer (b. 1932)
- 2 January – Viktor Tsaryov, Russian footballer (b. 1931)
- 3 January – Enzo Benedetti, Italian footballer (b. 1931)
- 4 January
  - Ezio Pascutti, Italian international footballer (b. 1937)
  - Paul Went, English footballer (b. 1949)
- 5 January
  - Graham Atkinson, English footballer (b. 1943)
  - Harry Taylor, English footballer (b. 1935)
- 6 January – Yaron Ben-Dov, Israeli footballer (b. 1970)
- 7 January – Laurie Topp, English international footballer (b. 1923)
- 8 January – Zacharie Noah, Cameroonian footballer (b. 1937)
- 9 January – Roberto Cabañas, Paraguayan international footballer (b. 1961)
- 10 January – Achmad Kurniawan, Indonesian footballer (b. 1979)
- 11 January – François Van der Elst, Belgian international footballer (b. 1954)
- 12 January – Graham Taylor, English footballer (b. 1944)
- 15 January – Kozo Kinomoto, Japanese footballer (b. 1949)
- 16 January – Amin Nasir, Singaporean footballer (b. 1968)
- 19 January
  - Ger van Mourik, Dutch footballer (b. 1931)
  - Giovanni Vastola, Italian footballer (born 1938)
- 21 January
  - Marc Baecke, Belgian footballer (born 1956)
  - Dave Shipperley, English footballer (born 1952)
- 24 January
  - Fred André, Dutch footballer (born 1941)
  - Carlos Verdejo, Chilean footballer (born 1934)
- 25 January – Ivan Pritargov, Bulgarian footballer (born 1952)
- 26 January
  - Lindy Delapenha, Jamaican footballer (born 1927)
  - Miikka Toivola, Finnish footballer (born 1949)
  - Michael Tönnies, German footballer (born 1959)
- 27 January
  - Wim Anderiesen Jr., Dutch footballer (born 1931)
  - Tatiana Repeikina, Russian footballer (born 1973).
  - Billy Simpson, Northern Irish footballer (born 1929)
- 29 January
  - Ruslan Barburoș, Moldovan footballer (born 1978)
  - Pat Corr, Northern Irish footballer (born 1927)
  - Willy Fossli, Norwegian footballer (born 1931)

=== February ===
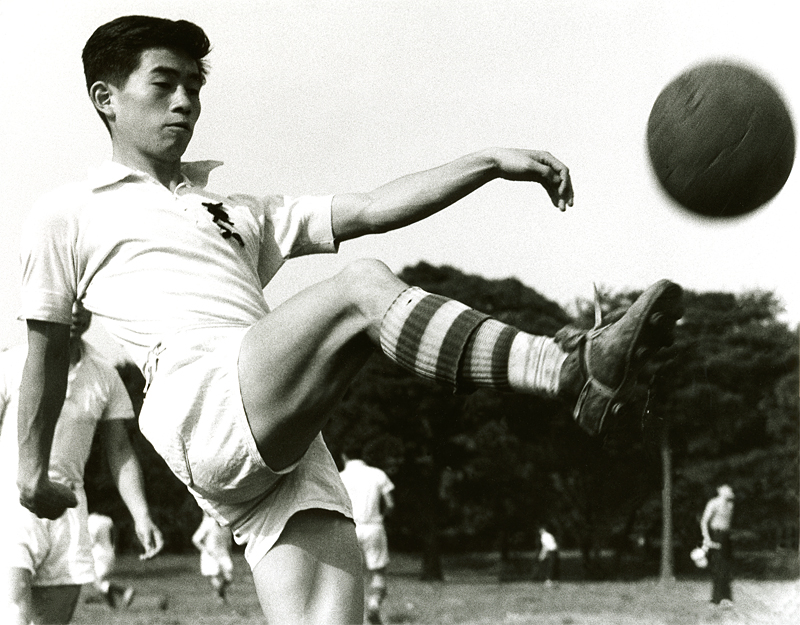
Shunichiro Okano

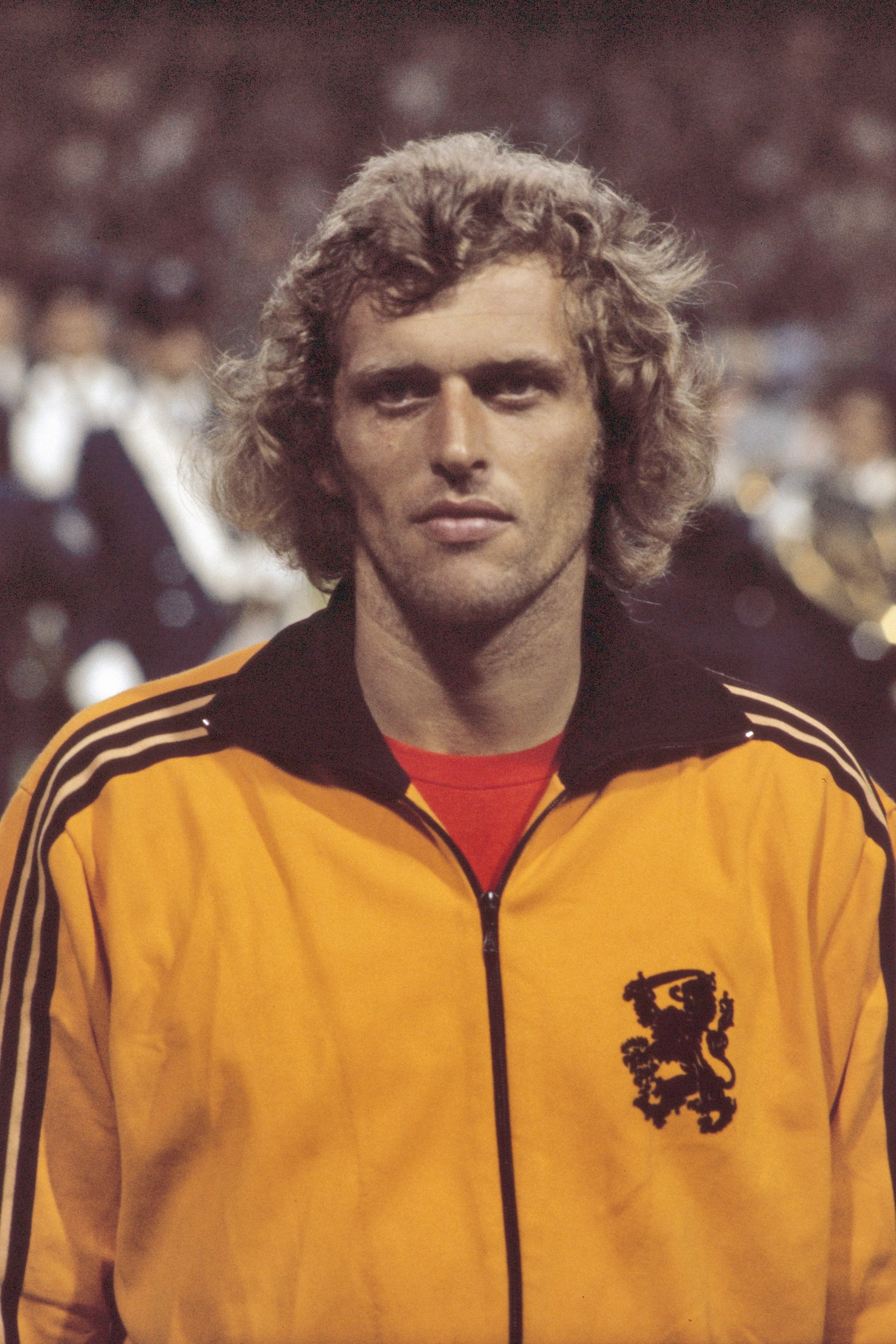
Piet Keizer

- 1 February
  - Constantin Dinulescu, Romanian footballer (born 1931)
  - Cor van der Hoeven, Dutch footballer (born 1921)
- 2 February
  - Shunichiro Okano, Japanese international footballer, coach, and President of Japan Football Association (born 1931)
  - Miltos Papapostolou, Greek footballer (born 1936)
- 4 February – Hans van der Hoek, Dutch international footballer (born 1933)
- 8 February – Viktor Chanov, Ukrainian footballer (born 1959)
- 9 February – Piet Keizer, Dutch international footballer (born 1943)
- 11 February – Juan Ulloa, Costa Rican footballer (born 1935)
- 12 February
  - Sam Arday, Ghanaian football manager (born 1945)
  - Bobby Murdoch, English footballer (born 1936)
- 14 February – Ríkharður Jónsson, Icelandic international footballer (born 1929)
- 15 February
  - Manfred Kaiser, East-German international footballer (born 1929)
  - Roy Proverbs, English footballer (born 1932)
- 16 February – Bengt Gustavsson, Swedish international footballer and manager (born 1928)
- 18 February
  - Roger Hynd, Scottish footballer (born 1942)
  - Henk Nienhuis, Dutch footballer (born 1941)
- 19 February
  - Shibaji Banerjee, Indian footballer
  - Paul McCarthy, Irish footballer (born 1971)
  - Roman Zhuravskyi, Ukrainian footballer (born 1948)
- 25 February – Bobby Lumley, English footballer (born 1933)
- 27 February
  - Marcel De Corte, Belgian footballer (born 1929)
  - Zvjezdan Cvetković, Yugoslavian international footballer und Croatian Serb manager (born 1960)
  - Alex Young, Scottish international footballer (born 1937)

=== March ===
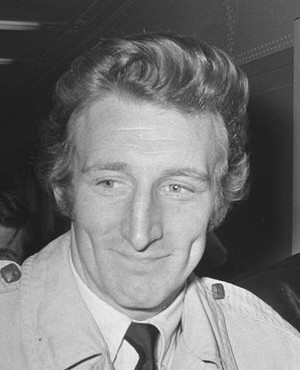
Tommy Gemmell

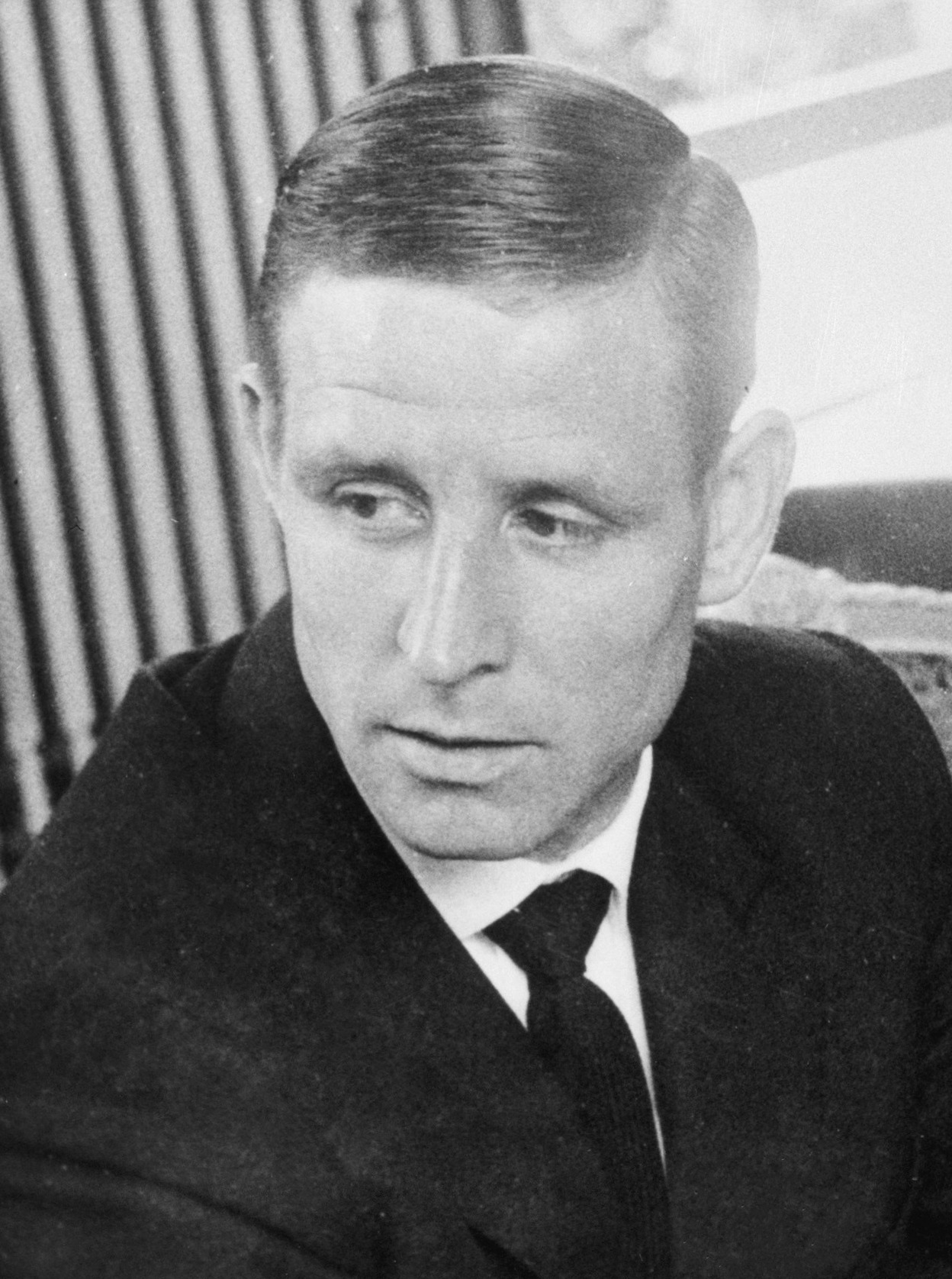
Raymond Kopa

- 2 March
  - Tarcisio Catanese, Italian footballer (born 1967)
  - Édouard Close, 87, Belgian politician, Burgemeester of Liège (1976–1991).
  - Tommy Gemmell, Scottish international footballer and manager (born 1943)
- 3 March – Raymond Kopa, French international footballer (born 1931)
- 4 March – Alberto Villalta, Salvadorian footballer (born 1947)
- 6 March – Marek Ostrowski, Polish international footballer (born 1959)
- 7 March – Juan Carlos Touriño, Spanish international footballer (born 1944)
- 12 March – Dave Taylor, English footballer (born 1940)
- 13 March – Hiroto Muraoka, Japanese footballer (born 1931)
- 14 March
  - Paul Bowles English footballer (born 1957)
  - Jim McAnearney, English footballer (born 1935)
- 16 March – Arne Høivik, Norwegian international footballer (born 1932)
- 19 March – Ryan McBride, Northern Irish footballer (born 1989)
- 22 March
  - Ken Currie, Scottish footballer (born 1925)
  - Ronnie Moran, English footballer (born 1934)
- 24 March – Wolfgang Solz, German international footballer (born 1940)
- 25 March – Asbjørn Hansen, Norwegian footballer (born 1930)
- 26 March – Vladimir Kazachyonok, Soviet international footballer and Russian coach (born 1952)
- 27 March
  - Romolo Bizzotto, Italian footballer (born 1925)
  - Eduard Mudrik, Soviet Russian international footballer (born 1939)

=== April ===
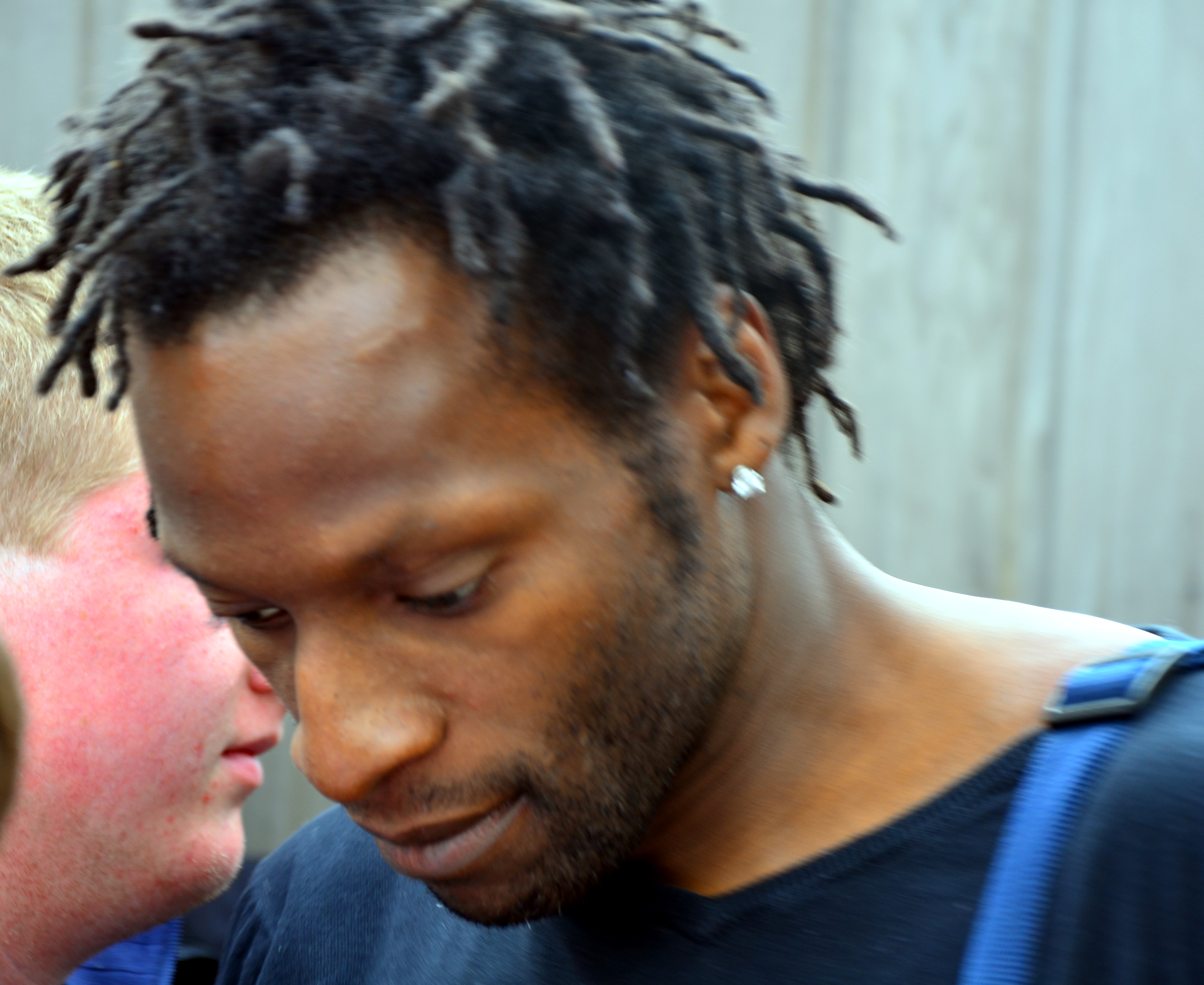
Ugo Ehiogu

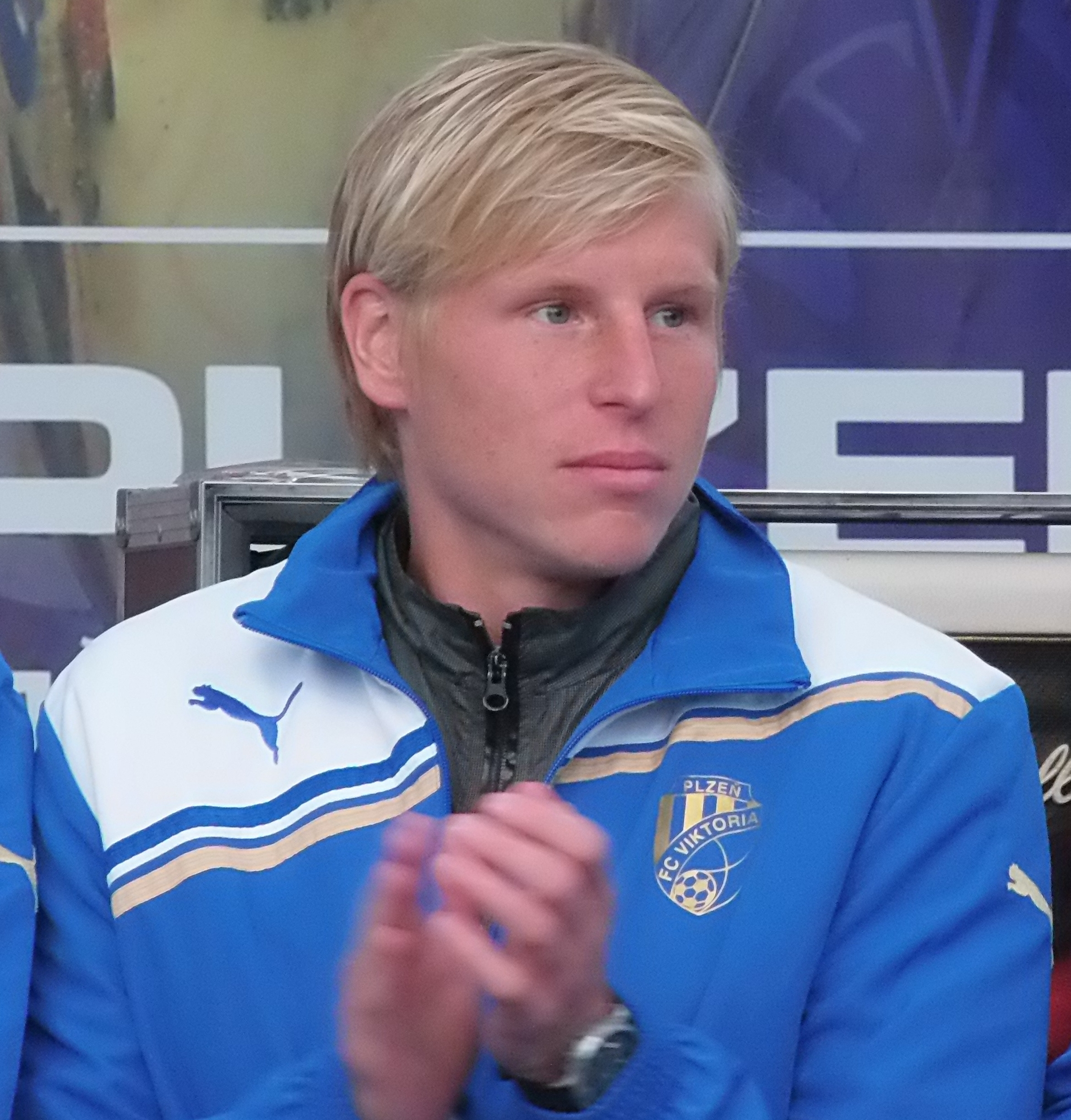
František Rajtoral

- 1 April – Stuart Markland, Scottish footballer (born 1948)
- 4 April – Karl Stotz, Austrian international footballer and manager (born 1927)
- 10 April – Fred Furniss, English footballer (born 1922)
- 15 April – Amílcar Henríquez, Panamaian international footballer (born 1983)
- 16 April – Spartaco Landini, Italian footballer (born 1944)
- 18 April – Mihalj Mesaroš, Serbian footballer (born 1935)
- 20 April – Roberto Ferreiro, Argentine international footballer and manager (born 1935)
- 21 April – Ugo Ehiogu, English international footballer and coach (born 1972)
- 23 April – František Rajtoral, Czech international footballer (born 1986)
- 26 April – Moïse Brou Apanga, Gabonese international footballer (born 1982)
- 27 April – Nikolai Arefyev, Russian footballer (born 1979)

=== May ===
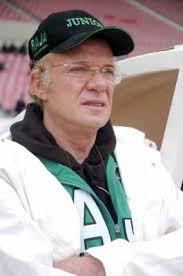
Oscar Fulloné

- 2 May – Cammy Duncan, Scottish footballer (born 1965)
- 6 May
  - Tony Conwell, English footballer (born 1932)
  - Peter Noble, English footballer (born 1944)
- 7 May: Eduard Gutiérrez, Colombian footballer (born 1995)
- 8 May: Ulugbek Ruzimov, Uzbekistani footballer (born 1968)
- 13 May:
  - Yanko Daucik, Czech footballer (born 1941)
  - Rachid Natouri, Algerian footballer (born 1946)
- 16 May: Ronnie Cocks, Maltese footballer (born 1943)
- 17 May:
  - Raúl Córdoba, Mexican international footballer (born 1924)
  - Todor Veselinović, Serbian footballer (born 1930)
- 18 May:
  - Volodymyr Dudarenko, Soviet footballer (born 1946)
  - Eric Stevenson, Scottish footballer (born 1942)
- 19 May:
  - David Bystroň, Czech footballer (born 1982)
  - Corbett Cresswell, English footballer (born 1932)
  - Tommy Ross, Scottish footballer (born 1946)
- 20 May:
  - Recep Adanır, Turkish footballer (born 1929)
  - Noel Kinsey, Welsh footballer (born 1925)
- 22 May: Oscar Fulloné, Argentine footballer (born 1939)
- 25 May: Emili Vicente, Spanish footballer (born 1965)
- 27 May: Ludwig Preis, German football coach (born 1971)
- 30 May:
  - Dibyo Previan Caesario, Indonesian footballer (born 1992)
  - Robert Hammond, Ghanaian footballer

=== June ===
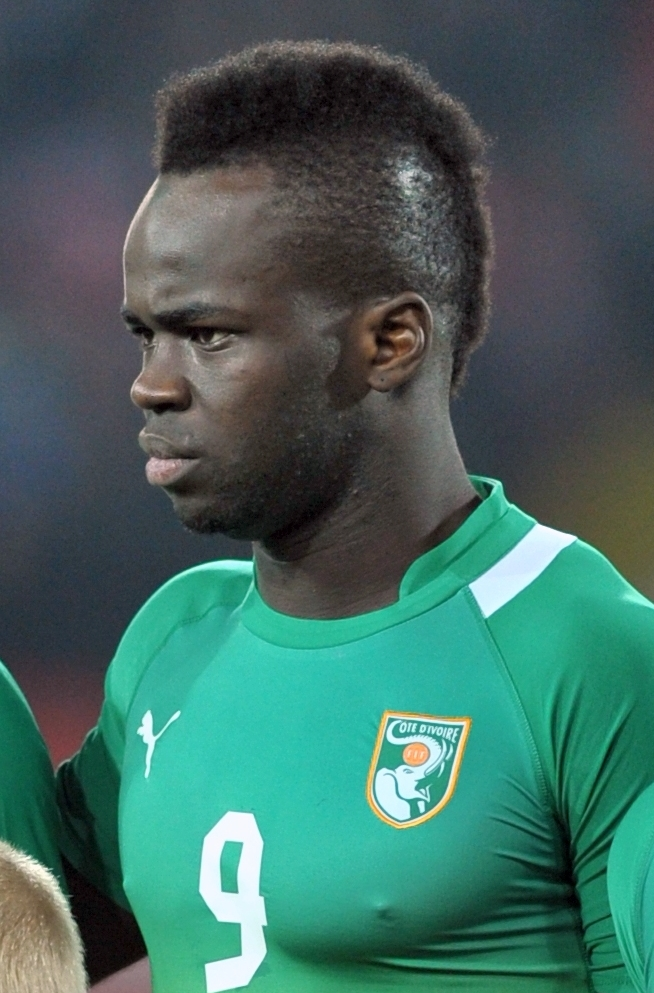
Cheick Tioté

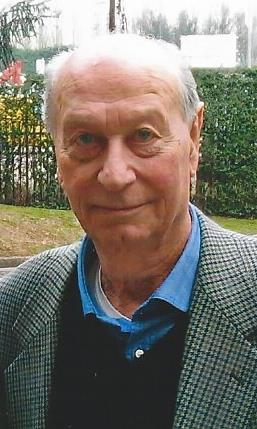
Giuliano Sarti

- 5 June:
  - Marcos Coll, Colombian footballer (born 1935)
  - Giuliano Sarti, Italian international footballer (born 1933)
  - Cheick Tioté, Ivorian footballer (born 1986)
- 7 June: Ernie Edds, English footballer (born 1926)
- 8 June:
  - Václav Halama, Czech footballer (born 1940)
  - Sergo Kutivadze, Georgian footballer (born 1944)
  - Jan Notermans, Dutch footballer (born 1932)
- 12 June:
  - Pessalli, Brazilian footballer (born 1990)
  - Karl-Heinz Weigang, German footballer (born 1935)
- 14 June: Jacques Foix, French international footballer (born 1930)
- 16 June:
  - Edzai Kasinauyo, Zimbabwean footballer (born 1975)
  - Günter Siebert, German footballer (born 1930)
- 18 June: Albert Franks, English footballer (born 1936)
- 20 June: Frode Larsen, Norwegian footballer (born 1949)
- 21 June: Kelechi Emeteole, Nigerian footballer (born 1951)
- 23 June: Tonny van der Linden, Dutch footballer (born 1932)
- 25 June: José Manuel Mourinho Félix, Portuguese footballer (born 1938)
- 27 June: Stéphane Paille, French footballer (born 1965)
- 28 June: John Higgins, Scottish footballer (born 1930)
- 30 June: László Kovács, Hungarian footballer (born 1951)

=== July ===
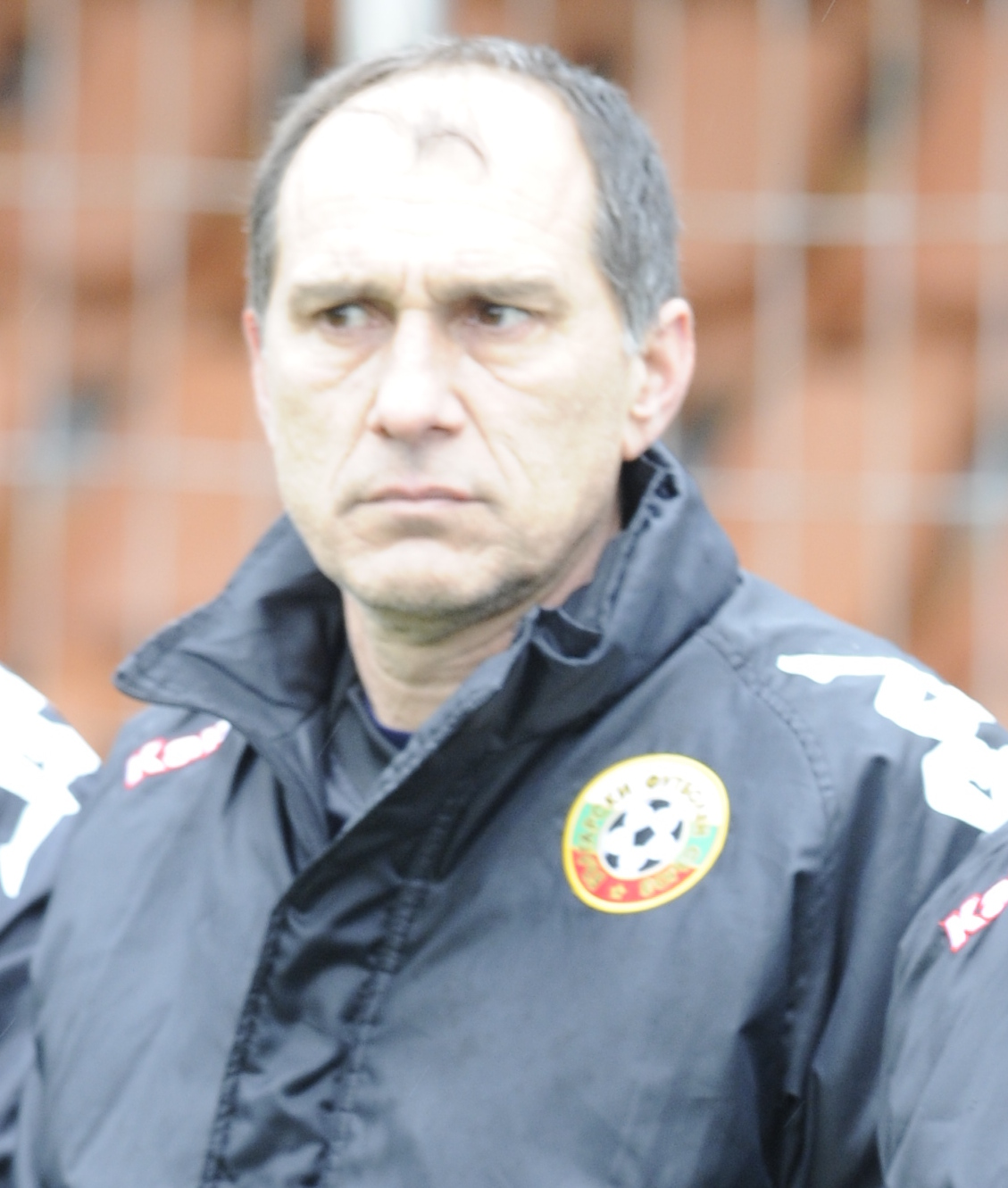
Ayan Sadakov

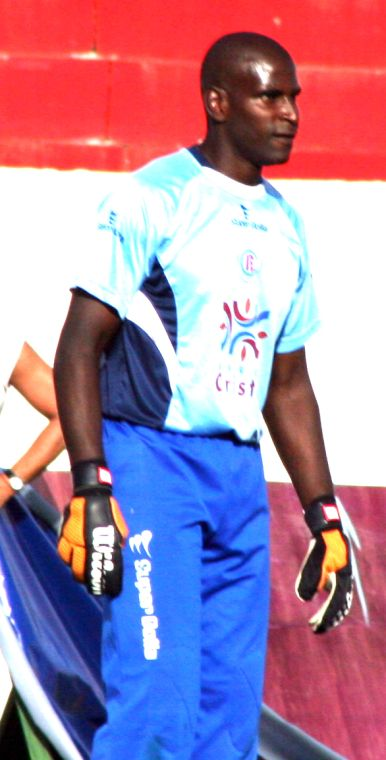
Max

- 1 July:
  - Ibra Agbo, Equatoguinean footballer (born 1987)
  - Ayan Sadakov, Bulgarian footballer (born 1961)
- 2 July:
  - Billy Cook, Australian footballer (born 1940)
  - John McCormick, Scottish footballer (born 1936)
- 4 July: Ntuthuko Radebe, South African footballer (born 1994)
- 5 July: John McKenzie, Scottish footballer (born 1925)
- 6 July:
  - Heinz Schneiter, Swiss footballer and manager (born 1935)
  - Ken Wimshurst, English footballer (born 1938)
- 7 July:
  - Ray Barnard, English footballer (born 1933)
  - Johnson Kendrick, Brazilian footballer (born 1992)
  - Tony Moore, English footballer (born 1947)
- 8 July: Roy Richards, Vincentian footballer (born 1983)
- 10 July: Eugène Koffi Kouamé, Ivorian footballer (born 1988)
- 11 July: Gert Trinklein, German footballer (born 1949)
- 14 July: Bert Hill, English footballer (1930)
- 15 July:
  - Josef Hamerl, Austrian footballer (born 1931)
  - Davie Laing, Scottish footballer (born 1925)
- 19 July: Joe Walters, Scottish footballer (born 1935)
- 22 July: Marcel Kunz, Swiss footballer (born 1943)
- 23 July: Waldir Peres, Brazilian footballer (born 1951)
- 26 July:
  - Maxlei dos Santos Luzia, Brazilian footballer (born 1975)
  - Jimmy White, English footballer (born 1942)
- 27 July:
  - Perivaldo Dantas, Brazilian footballer (born 1953)
  - Abdelmajid Dolmy, Moroccan footballer (born 1953)
  - Valeri Maslov, Russian footballer (born 1940)
  - Ovidio Messa, Bolivian footballer (born 1952)
  - Manfred Rummel, German footballer (born 1938)

=== August ===
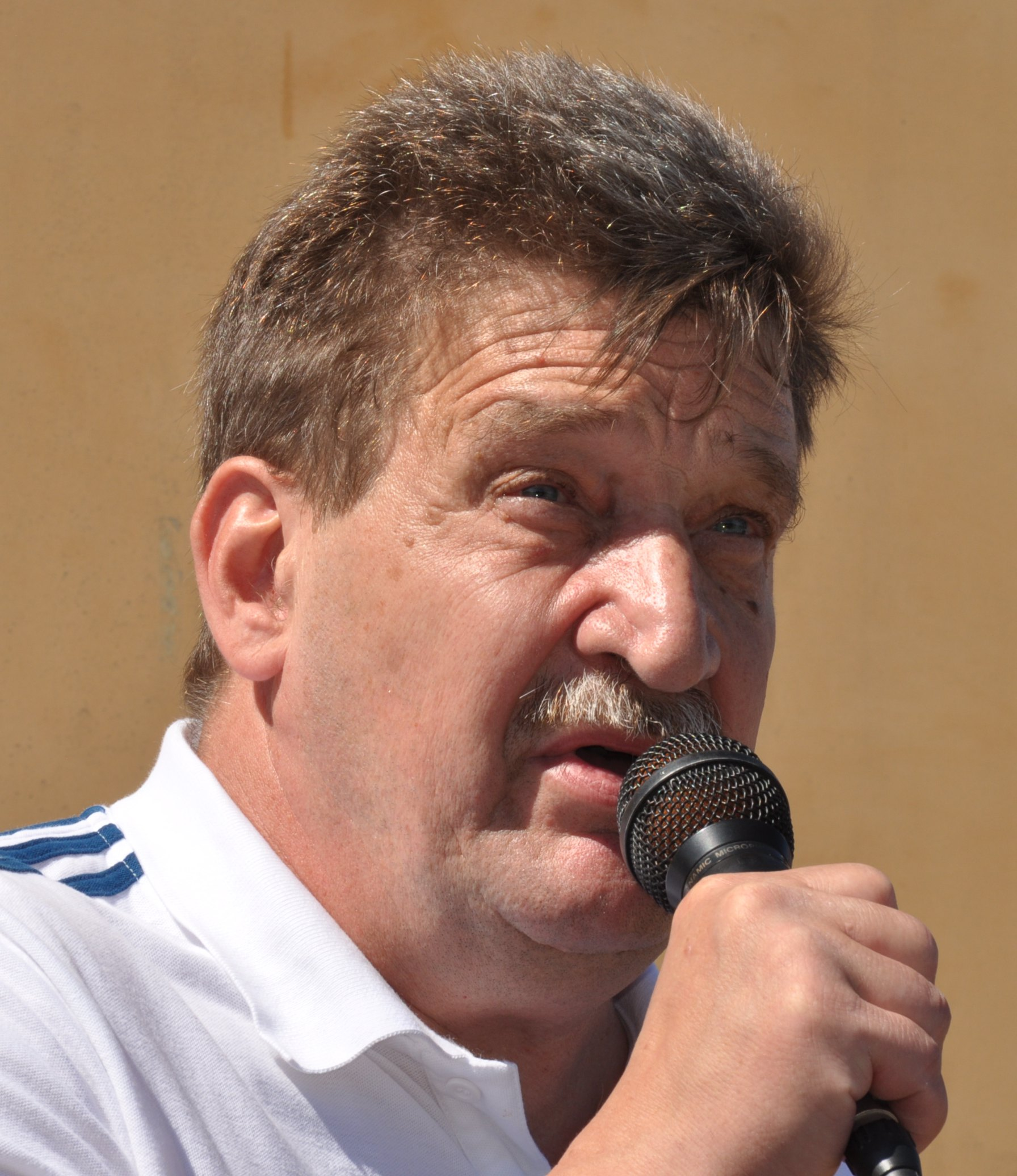
Pertti Alaja

- 2 August:
  - Dave Caldwell, Scottish footballer (born 1932)
  - Ely Tacchella, Swiss footballer (born 1936)
- 5 August: Joe Cilia, Maltese footballer (born 1937)
- 7 August: Tor Røste Fossen, Norwegian footballer (born 1940)
- 9 August: Beethoven Javier, Uruguayan footballer (born 1940)
- 10 August:
  - Miroslav Ćurčić, Serbian footballer (born 1962)
  - Alois Eisenträger, German footballer (born 1927)
- 15 August: Joe McGurn, Scottish footballer (born 1965)
- 16 August: John Ogston, Scottish footballer (born 1939)
- 18 August: Pertti Alaja, Finnish footballer (born 1952)
- 21 August: Bill Green, English footballer (born 1950)
- 23 August: Engelbert Jarek, Polish footballer (born 1935)
- 24 August: Alan Boswell, English footballer (born 1943)
- 26 August: Dave Bumpstead, English footballer (born 1935)
- 30 August: Elmer Acevedo, Salvadoran footballer (born 1949)

=== September ===
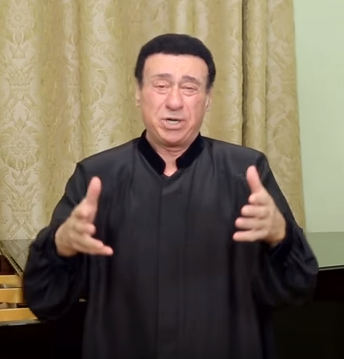
Zurab Sotkilava

- 3 September: Piet Ouderland, Dutch footballer (born 1933)
- 6 September: Nicolae Lupescu, Romanian footballer (born 1940)
- 8 September: Humberto Rosa, Argentine-Italian footballer (born 1932)
- 12 September: Bert McCann, Scottish footballer (born 1932)
- 13 September: Derek Wilkinson, English footballer (born 1935)
- 14 September: Wim Huis, Dutch footballer (born 1927)
- 17 September: Eugenio Bersellini, Italian footballer (born 1936)
- 18 September:
  - Jean Plaskie, Belgian international footballer (born 1941)
  - Zurab Sotkilava, Georgian-Russian footballer (born 1937)
  - Paul Wilson, Scottish footballer (born 1950)
- 22 September: John Worsdale, English footballer (born 1948)
- 26 September: Richard Boucher, French footballer (born 1932)
- 28 September:
  - Aleksey Arifullin, Russian footballer (born 1970)
  - Željko Perušić, Croatian footballer (born 1936)
- 29 September: Rolf Herings, German football coach (born 1940)
- 30 September: Gunnar Thoresen, Norwegian footballer (born 1920)

=== October ===
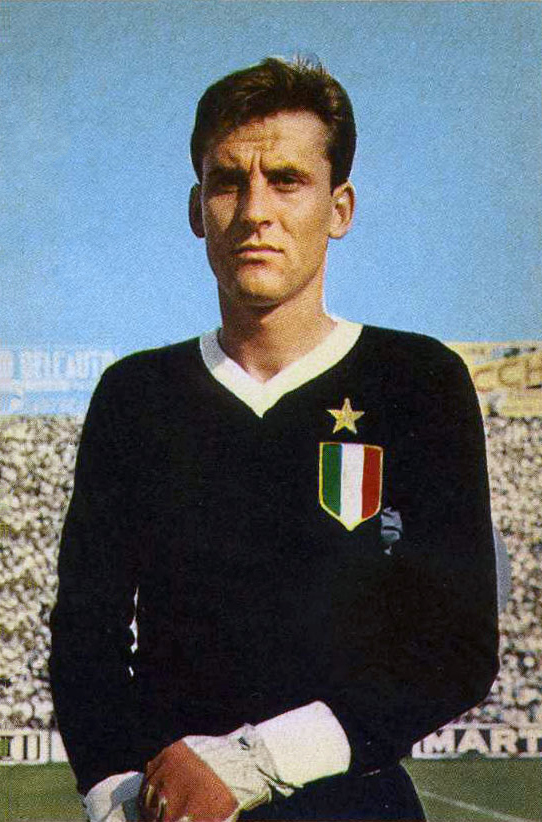
Roberto Anzolin

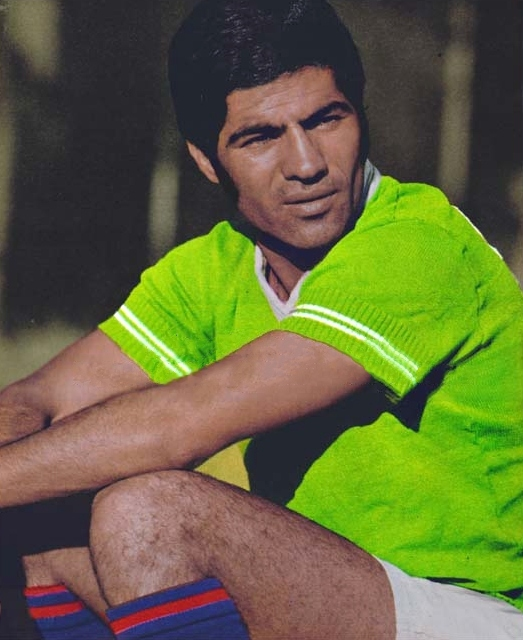
Ebrahim Ashtiani

- 1 October: Olivier Baudry, French footballer (born 1973)
- 2 October: Patrocinio Samudio, Paraguayan footballer (born 1975)
- 3 October: Les Mutrie, English footballer (born 1951)
- 5 October: Georges Griffiths, Ivorian footballer (born 1990)
- 6 October: Roberto Anzolin, Italian footballer (born 1938)
- 7 October: Konstantin Sarsania, Russian footballer, manager and agent (born 1968)
- 8 October:
  - Michel Fernando Costa, Brazilian footballer (born 1981)
  - Mlondi Dlamini, South African footballer (born 1997)
- 9 October:
  - Jimmy Reid, Scottish footballer (born 1935)
  - József Tóth, Hungarian footballer (born 1929)
- 11 October: Dick Hewitt, English footballer (born 1943)
- 13 October: Pierre Hanon, Belgian footballer (born 1936)
- 15 October: Choirul Huda, Indonesian footballer (born 1979)
- 17 October: Giuseppe Massa, Italian footballer (born 1948)
- 19 October: Brian Riley, English footballer (born 1937)
- 24 October: Ebrahim Ashtiani, Iranian footballer (born 1942)
- 27 October: Abdoulaye Soulama, Burkinabé footballer (born 1979)
- 28 October:
  - Viktor Karachun, Russian footballer (born 1959)
  - Manuel Sanchís, Spanish footballer (born 1938)
- 30 October: Eugène Parlier, Swiss footballer (born 1929)
- 31 October:
  - Stefano Salvatori, Italian footballer (born 1967)
  - Abubakari Yakubu, Ghanaian footballer (born 1981)

=== November ===
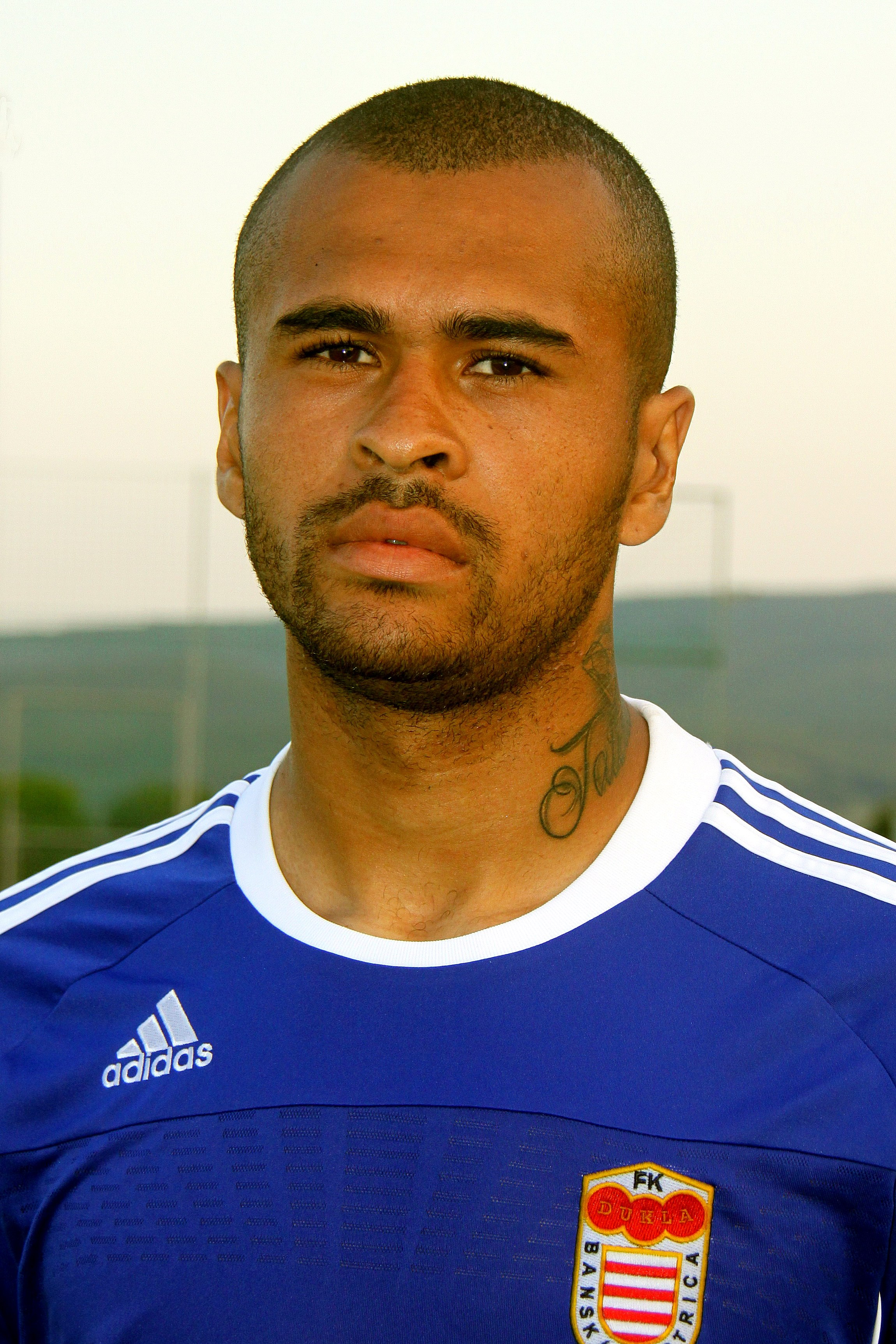
Dionatan Teixeira

- 1 November: Ramón Cabrero, Argentinian footballer and coach (born 1947)
- 2 November: Costanzo Balleri, Italian footballer (born 1933)
- 4 November: Tallys Machado de Oliveira, Brazilian footballer (born 1987)
- 5 November:
  - Erlandas Duršlikas, Lithuanian footballer (born 1998)
  - Dionatan Teixeira, Slovak footballer (born 1992)
- 6 November:Günter Hoge, German footballer (born 1940)
  - Feliciano Rivilla, Spanish footballer (born 1936)
- 7 November: Hans Schäfer, German footballer (born 1927)
- 8 November: Josip Weber, Croatian-Belgian footballer (born 1964)
- 9 November: Akbar Eftekhari, Iranian footballer (born 1943)
- 11 November:
  - Amar Rouaï, Algerian footballer (born 1932)
- 12 November: Santiago Vernazza, Argentine footballer (born 1928)
- 13 November: Frank O'Connor, Australian footballer (born 1923)
- 15 November:
  - Hamad Ndikumana, Rwandan footballer (born 1978)
  - Bert Ormond, New Zealand footballer (born 1931)
- 16 November: Tommy Farrer, English footballer (born 1922)
- 18 November:
  - Commins Menapi, Solomon Islands footballer (born 1977)
  - Friedel Rausch, German footballer (born 1940)
- 20 November: Janusz Wójcik, Polish footballer (born 1953)
- 21 November: Luis Garisto, Uruguayan footballer (born 1945)
- 22 November: Otto Luttrop, German footballer (born 1939)
- 23 November: Allan Harris, English footballer (born 1942)
- 24 November: Ángel Berni, Paraguayan footballer (born 1931)
- 26 November: Eliezer Spiegel, Israeli footballer (born 1922)
- 27 November: Dermot Drummy, English footballer (1961)
- 28 November:
  - Jimmy McEwan, Scottish footballer (born 1929)
  - Zdeněk Šreiner, Czech footballer (born 1954)
- 29 November: Ján Strausz, Slovak footballer (born 1942)

=== December ===
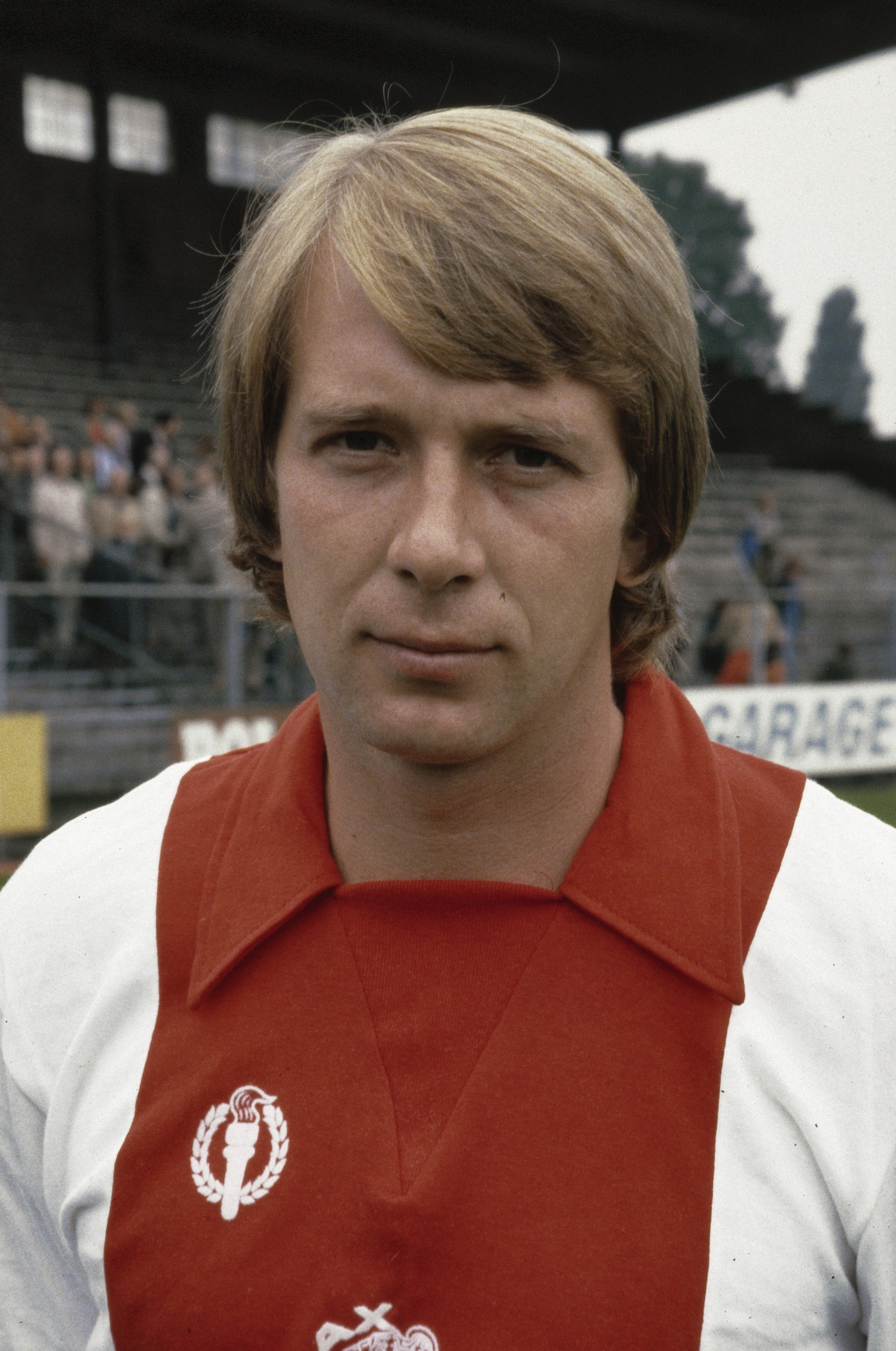
Henning Jensen

- 3 December: Ian Twitchin, English footballer (born 1952)
- 4 December:
  - Henning Jensen, Danish footballer (born 1949)
  - Gregory Rigters, Surinamese footballer (born 1985)
- 5 December:
  - Michel Dighneef, Belgian footballer (born 1936)
  - Laurie Rymer, Australian footballer (1934)
  - Jacques Simon, French footballer (born 1941)
- 6 December: Juan José Díaz Galiana, Spanish football coach (born 1949)
- 8 December: Pál Dárdai, Hungarian footballer (born 1951)
- 9 December: Benjamin Massing, Cameroonian footballer (born 1962)
- 10 December: Ivan Stoyanov, Bulgarian footballer (born 1949)
- 11 December: Paul Holz, German footballer (born 1952)
- 15 December:
  - Dave Boyd, Australian footballer (born 1927)
  - Felipe Mesones, Argentine footballer (born 1936)
  - Paul Straney, Northern Irish footballer (born 1975)
- 17 December:
  - Higinio García Fernández, Spanish footballer (born 1956)
  - Frank Hodgkin, Australian footballer (born 1941)
- 18 December: Josef Pešice, Czech footballer (born 1950)
- 19 December: Yevhen Kotelnykov, Ukrainian footballer (born 1939)
- 20 December: Jiří Sloup, Czech footballer (born 1953)
- 21 December:
  - Zdzisław Bieniek, Polish footballer (born 1930)
  - Renan Martins Pereira, Brazilian footballer (born 1997)
  - Timur Segizbayev, Kazak footballer (born 1941)
- 22 December:
  - Cyril Beavon, English footballer (born 1937)
  - Ken Hands, Australian footballer (born 1926)
- 23 December: Cesare Zamboni, Italian footballer (born 1931)
- 24 December:
  - Ken Feltscheer, Australian footballer (born 1915)
  - Edu Ferreira, Portuguese footballer (born 1997)
  - Renato Marchiaro, Italian footballer (born 1919)
- 26 December:
  - Gerd Hennig, German football referee (born 1935)
  - Willie Penman, Scottish footballer (born 1939)
  - Steve Piper, English footballer (born 1953)
- 27 December:
  - Osvaldo Fattori, Italian footballer (born 1922)
  - Roberto Ortega, Argentine footballer (born 1932)
  - Lothar Schämer, German footballer (born 1940)
- 28 December: Stanisław Terlecki, Polish footballer (born 1955)
- 30 December:
  - John Faulkner, English footballer (born 1948)
  - Sean McCaffrey, Irish football manager (born 1959)
