= Arefyev =

Arefyev or Arefiev (Russian: Аре́фьев), female form Arefyeva, is a Russian surname that may refer to:

- Aleksei Arefyev (born 1971), Soviet and Russian footballer
- Artyom Arefyev (born 1984), Russian Paralympian athlete
- Nikolai Arefyev (1979–2017), Russian footballer
- Nikolay Arefiev (politician) (born 1949), Russian politician
- Viktor Arefyev (born 1975), Ukrainian footballer
- Olga Arefieva (born 1966), Russian musician
