= Wim Huis =

Dutch footballer

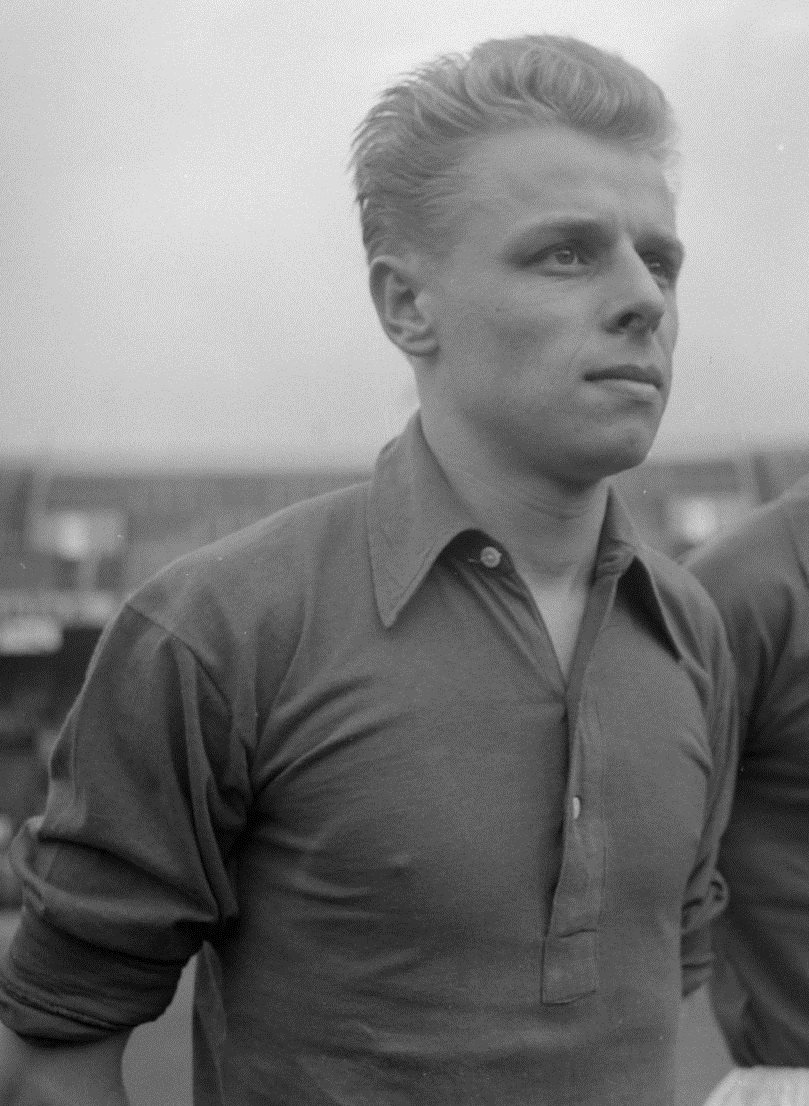

Personal information
- Full name: Willem Huis
- Date of birth: 15 November 1927
- Place of birth: Amsterdam, Netherlands
- Date of death: 14 September 2017 (aged 89)
- Place of death: Maastricht, Netherlands
- Position: Forward

Senior career*
Years	Team	Apps	(Gls)
1949–1954	Ajax	30	(12)
1954–1961	Fortuna '54	36	(7)
1961–1962	Limburgia	30	(6)
- * Club domestic league appearances and goals

Willem "Wim" Huis (15 November 1927 – 14 September 2017) was a Dutch footballer who played for Ajax, Fortuna '54 and Limburgia.

== Club career ==
Huis played five years for Ajax, playing 30 official matches in their senior team and scored 12 goals. His debut came on 18 September 1949 in a 1–0 win against RCH. He later played a few seasons for Fortuna '54 and Limburgia.

== Career statistics ==
Club	Season	League	
Club	Season	Apps	Goals
Ajax	1949–50	2	0
Ajax	1950–51	1	0
Ajax	1951–52	1	0
Ajax	1952–53	6	1
Ajax	1953–54	20	11
Total		30	12

== Sources ==
- Evert Vermer, Marcelle van Hoof (1999). Ajax 100 Jaar Jubileumboek 1900-2000. Amsterdam: Luitingh-Sijthoff. ISBN 90-245-3497-6.
