= Michel Dighneef =

Belgian politician and footballer

Personal information
- Full name: Michel Dighneef
- Date of birth: December 20, 1936
- Place of birth: Tilleur, Saint-Nicolas, Belgium
- Date of death: December 5, 2017 (aged 80)
- Place of death: Belgium
- Position: Centre-back

Senior career*
Years	Team	Apps	(Gls)
- R.F.C. Tilleur
- * Club domestic league appearances and goals

Michel Dighneef (20 December 1936 – 5 December 2017) was a Belgian footballer and politician.

A native of Tilleur, Saint-Nicolas in Liège, Dighneef was born in 1936. During his football career, he often played centre-back for his hometown team, R.F.C. Tilleur. After his retired from football, Dighneef, a member of Parti Socialiste, served in the Senate from 1991 to 1995, when he was elected to the Chamber of Representatives. Dighneef stepped down as representative in 1999 and died on 5 December 2017, aged 80.
