= 2016–17 Central African Republic League =

Central African Republic League
- Season: 2016–17
- Champions: Olympic Real de Bangui

The 2016–17 Central African Republic League season is the top level of football competition in Central African Republic.

== Teams ==
A total of 12 teams participate in the Ligue de Bangui Première Division.

1.Olympique Réal	 	  27pts [C]
2.AS Tempête Mocaf	 	  18
3.Espérance du 5ème	  17
4.Réal Comboni		  16
5.SCAF			  15
6.Anges de Fatima		  15
7.Anégrée Freese		  15
8.FC SOS de Gbangouma	  15
9.DFC8			  13

10.Castel Foot [P]

11.Sica Sport 11 12.Aset de Gobongo 9 [P]
