= Renato Marchiaro =

Italian footballer

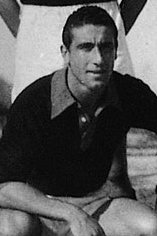

Personal information
- Date of birth: 16 February 1919
- Place of birth: Bra, Italy
- Date of death: 25 December 2017 (aged 98)
- Place of death: Nice, France
- Position: Striker

Senior career*
Years	Team	Apps	(Gls)
1937–1940	Juventus	1	(0)
1940–1942	Schio		
1942–1943	Liguria	7	(0)
1946–1947	FC Antibes	18	(8)
1947–1948	Nice	15	(4)
1948–1949	Olympique Alès	11	(1)
1949–1950	Biellese	20	(5)
1950–1951	Belenenses		
1951–1952	Angers SCO	9	(2)
- * Club domestic league appearances and goals

Renato Marchiaro (16 February 1919 – 25 December 2017) was an Italian professional football player.
