= Beethoven Javier =

Uruguayan footballer (1947–2017)

Personal information
- Full name: Beethoven Alberto Javier Silva
- Date of birth: 20 June 1947
- Place of birth: Treinta y Tres, Uruguay
- Date of death: 9 August 2017 (aged 70)
- Position: Winger

Senior career*
Years	Team	Apps	(Gls)
1968–1969	Nacional	2	(0)
1974–1978	Defensor Sporting	31	(0)

International career
1976–1977	Uruguay	5	(0)
- * Club domestic league appearances and goals

Beethoven Javier (20 June 1947 – 9 August 2017), nicknamed "Cuco", was a Uruguayan former football player and coach. Javier played the left wing position.

== Club career ==
In his professional career, Javier started at left wing for Defensor Sporting Club during their championship 1976 season. He also played for River Plate, Colón, Rentistas and Huracán Buceo.

== International career ==
Javier made five appearances for the Uruguay national team in 1976 and 1977.

== Managerial career ==
Javier coached Huracán Buceo, Central Español and Miramar Misiones.

== Death ==
Javier died on 9 August 2017, at the age of 70.
