= Roman Zhuravskyi =

Ukrainian footballer

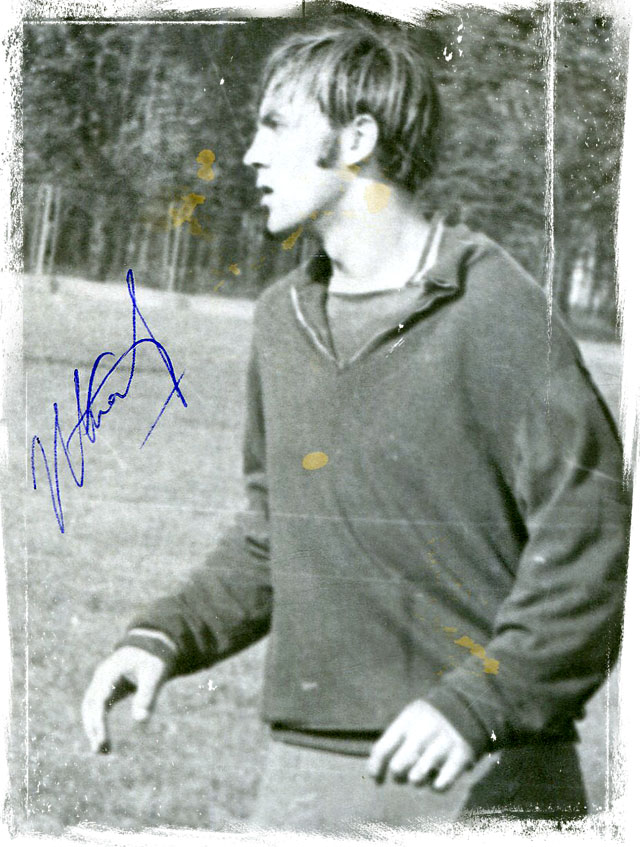

Personal information
- Full name: Roman Petrovych Zhuravskyi
- Date of birth: 3 June 1948
- Place of birth: Lviv, Ukrainian SSR
- Date of death: 19 February 2017 (aged 68)
- Place of death: Lviv, Ukraine
- Height: 1.83 m (6 ft 0 in)
- Position: Defender

Youth career
- 1966: SKA Lviv

Senior career*
Years	Team	Apps	(Gls)
1967	SKA Kyiv	?	(?)
1968	SKA Lviv	15	(1)
1969–1970	FC Avtomobilist Zhytomyr	37	(1)
1971	FC Dynamo Kyiv	15	(0)
1972–1973	FC Karpaty Lviv	16	(1)
1973–1974	FC Avtomobilist Zhytomyr	20	(1)
1974	FC Metalist Kharkiv	5	(2)
1974	FC Avtomobilist Zhytomyr	21	(1)
1975	FC Spartak Ivano-Frankivsk	23	(4)
- * Club domestic league appearances and goals

Roman Zhuravskyi (Ukrainian: Роман Петрович Журавський; 3 June 1948 – 19 February 2017) was a Ukrainian professional football player who played as defender.

== Playing and coaching career ==
Zhuravskyi made his professional career in the different football teams of the Ukrainian SSR.

After his retirement he lived in Briukhovychi.

== Death ==
Zhuravskyi died on 19 February 2017 at the age of 68.

== Honours ==
- Soviet Top League (1) with FC Dynamo Kyiv: 1971
- Master of Sport of the USSR (1971)
