= Yaron Ben-Dov =

Israeli footballer

Yaron Ben-Dov ירון בן דב
Personal information
- Full name: Yaron Ben-Dov
- Date of birth: 11 January 1970
- Place of birth: Israel
- Date of death: 6 January 2017 (aged 46)

Youth career
- 1981–1989: Maccabi Netanya

Senior career*
Years	Team	Apps	(Gls)
1989–1993	Maccabi Netanya	48	(2)
1993–1994	Hapoel Tel Aviv	31	(0)
1994–1997	Ironi Rishon LeZion	71	(0)
Total		150	(2)

International career
1992	Israel	1	(0)
- * Club domestic league appearances and goals

Yaron Ben-Dov (Hebrew: ירון בן דב; 11 January 1970 – 6 January 2017) was an Israeli football player. He died on 6 January 2017. He was 46 years old.
