= Eduard Gutiérrez =

Colombian footballer (1995-2017)

Personal information
- Full name: Eduard Andrés Gutiérrez Castillo
- Date of birth: 9 August 1995
- Place of birth: El Agrado, Colombia
- Date of death: 7 May 2017 (aged 21)
- Place of death: Garzón, Colombia
- Height: 1.84 m (6 ft 1/2 in)
- Position: Defender

Senior career*
Years	Team	Apps	(Gls)
2015–2017	Atlético Huila	11	(0)
Total		11	(0)
- * Club domestic league appearances and goals

Eduard Andrés Gutiérrez Castillo (9 August 1995 – 7 May 2017) was a Colombian professional footballer who played for Atlético Huila as a defender. He died in a road traffic accident at the age of 21.

== Career statistics ==
Club	Season	League		Copa Colombia		Total	
Club	Season	Apps	Goals	Apps	Goals	Apps	Goals
Atlético Huila	2015	2	0	0	0	2	0
Atlético Huila	2016	5	0	3	0	8	0
Atlético Huila	2017	4	0	5	0	9	0
Career total		11	0	8	0	19	0
