= Günter Hoge =

German footballer (1940–2017)

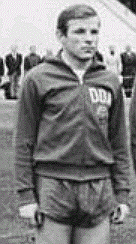
- Hoge in 1967

Personal information
- Date of birth: 7 October 1940
- Place of birth: Berlin, Germany
- Date of death: 6 November 2017 (aged 77)
- Place of death: Berlin, Germany
- Height: 1.69 m (5 ft 6 1/2 in)
- Position: Striker

Senior career*
Years	Team	Apps	(Gls)
1958–1962	ZASK Vorwärts Berlin	30	(7)
1962–1964	Motor Köpenick		
1964–1970	TSC Berlin / Union Berlin		
1970–1973	Motor Hennigsdorf		

International career
1961–1968	East Germany	6	(0)
- * Club domestic league appearances and goals

Günter Hoge (7 October 1940 – 6 November 2017) was a German footballer.

== Club career ==
He played as a striker for ZASK Vorwärts Berlin, Motor Köpenick, Union Berlin and Motor Hennigsdorf. He scored nine goals in 75 East German top-flight matches.

== International career ==
Hoge won six caps East Germany national team between 1961 and 1968.

== Career after pro times ==
The former player coached in the lower leagues in the (East) Berlin and Brandenburg region. Hoge died in 2017.
