= Max (footballer, born 1975) =

Brazilian footballer

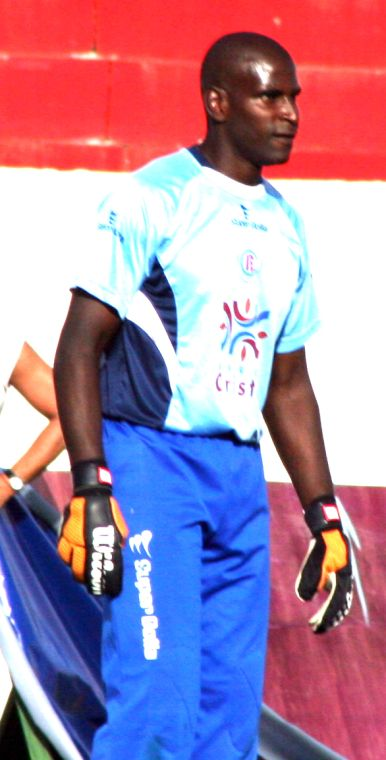

Personal information
- Full name: Maxlei dos Santos Luzia
- Date of birth: February 27, 1975
- Place of birth: Rio de Janeiro, Brazil
- Date of death: July 26, 2017 (aged 42)
- Place of death: Rio de Janeiro, Brazil
- Height: 1.84 m (6 ft 0 in)
- Position: Goalkeeper

Youth career
- 1993–1994: Portuguesa-RJ

Senior career*
Years	Team	Apps	(Gls)
1995–1998	Portuguesa-RJ	0	(0)
1999–2000	Bangu	18	(0)
2001	Friburguense	0	(0)
2001	América-RJ	0	(0)
2002–2008	Botafogo	85	(0)
2008	→ Vila Nova (loan)	17	(0)
2009	Itumbiara	0	(0)
2009–2010	Vila Nova	52	(0)
2011	Joinville	1	(0)
2012	Boa Esporte	6	(0)
2013	Gama	0	(0)
2014	Barra da Tijuca	0	(0)
Total		179	(0)
- * Club domestic league appearances and goals

Maxlei dos Santos Luzia or simply Max (27 February 1975 – 26 July 2017), was a Brazilian goalkeeper.

== Death ==
In June 2017, Max was the victim of an attempted robbery. Robbers hit his car in the city of Duque de Caxias in the Baixada Fluminense, with the intention of taking the vehicle, causing a serious accident. The goalkeeper suffered a fractured right hand and a cerebral edema. At the Hospital da Lagoa, in the city of Rio de Janeiro, Max had his clinical condition aggravated. The doctors noticed a rare autoimmune disease in Max; on July 25, he failed to respond to neurological tests, and the next day brain death was confirmed. It is unclear whether his death is the result of the injuries suffered during the robbery or due to the autoimmune disease.

== Honours ==
Botafogo

- Taça Guanabara: 2006
- Campeonato Carioca: 2006
- Taça Rio: 2007

Joinville

- Copa Santa Catarina: 2011
- Série C do Brasileiro: 2011

Boa Esporte

- Taça Minas Gerais: 2012
