= Nikolai Arefyev =

Russian footballer

Personal information
- Full name: Nikolai Aleksandrovich Arefyev
- Date of birth: 19 December 1979
- Place of birth: Russian SFSR
- Date of death: 27 April 2017 (aged 37)
- Place of death: Russia
- Height: 1.73 m (5 ft 8 in)
- Position: Midfielder

Senior career*
Years	Team	Apps	(Gls)
1997–2000	FC Torpedo Moscow	2	(0)
1997–2000	→ FC Torpedo-2	99	(10)
2000–2001	FC Lokomotiv Nizhny Novgorod	35	(0)
2002	FC KAMAZ Naberezhnye Chelny	16	(4)
2015–2016	FC Odintsovo		
- * Club domestic league appearances and goals

Nikolai Aleksandrovich Arefyev (Russian: Николай Александрович Арефьев; 19 December 1979 – 27 April 2017) was a Russian football player.
