= 2016 in association football =

The following were the scheduled events of association football for the year 2016 throughout the world.

== Events ==
=== Men's national teams ===
==== AFC ====
- 2–15 November: 2016 AFC Solidarity Cup in the Malaysia
  - (gold) : Nepal
  - (silver) : Macau
  - (bronze) : Laos
  - 4th: Brunei
- 19 November – 17 December: 2016 AFF Cup in Myanmar and Philippines
  - (gold) Thailand
  - (silver) Indonesia

==== CONMEBOL ====
- 3–26 June: Copa América Centenario in the United States
  - (gold) : Chile
  - (silver) : Argentina
  - (bronze) : Colombia
  - 4th: United States

==== OFC ====
- 28 May - 11 June: 2016 OFC Nations Cup in Papua New Guinea
  - (gold) : New Zealand
  - (silver) : Papua New Guinea
  - (bronze) : New Caledonia and Solomon Islands

==== UEFA ====
- 10 June — 10 July: UEFA Euro 2016 in France.
  - (gold) : Portugal
  - (silver) : France
  - (bronze) : Germany and Wales

=== Youth (men) ===
==== AFC ====
- 12–30 January: 2016 AFC U-23 Championship in Qatar
  - (gold) : Japan
  - (silver) : South Korea
  - (bronze) : Iraq
  - 4th: Qatar
- 10–23 July: 2016 AFF U-16 Youth Championship in Cambodia
  - (gold) : Australia
  - (silver) : Vietnam
  - (bronze) : Thailand
  - 4th: Cambodia
- 11–24 September: 2016 AFF U-19 Youth Championship in Vietnam
  - (gold) : Australia
  - (silver) : Thailand
  - (bronze) : Vietnam
- 15 September–2 October: 2016 AFC U-16 Championship in India
  - (gold) : Iraq
  - (silver) : Iran
  - (bronze) : Japan and North Korea
- 13–30 October: 2016 AFC U-19 Championship in Bahrain
  - (gold) : Japan
  - (silver) : Saudi Arabia
  - (bronze) : Iran and Vietnam

==== OFC ====
- 2–16 September: 2016 OFC U-20 Championship in Vanuatu
  - (gold) : New Zealand
  - (silver) : Vanuatu
  - (bronze) : New Caledonia and Solomon Islands

==== UEFA ====
- 5–21 May: 2016 UEFA European Under-17 Championship in Azerbaijan
  - (gold) : Portugal
  - (silver) : Spain
  - (bronze) : Germany
  - 4th: Netherlands
- 11–24 July: 2016 UEFA European Under-19 Championship in Germany
  - (gold) : France
  - (silver) : Italy

=== Women's national teams ===
- July 26 – August 4: 2016 AFF Women's Championship in Mandalay
  - (gold) : Thailand
  - (silver) : Vietnam
  - (bronze) : Myanmar
- 19 November – 3 December: 2016 Africa Women Cup of Nations in Cameroon
  - (gold) : Nigeria
  - (silver) : Cameroon
  - (bronze) : Ghana
  - 4th: South Africa

=== Youth (women) ===
- 4–16 May: 2016 UEFA Women's Under-17 Championship in Belarus
  - (gold) : Germany
  - (silver) : Spain
  - (bronze) : England
  - 4th: Norway
- 19–31 July: 2016 UEFA Women's Under-19 Championship in Slovakia
  - (gold) : France
  - (silver) : Spain
  - (bronze) : Switzerland and Netherlands
- 30 September–21 October: 2016 FIFA U-17 Women's World Cup in Jordan
  - (gold) : North Korea
  - (silver) : Japan
  - (bronze) : Spain
  - 4th: Venezuela
- 13 November–3 December: 2016 FIFA U-20 Women's World Cup in (Papua New Guinea) Port Moresby
  - (gold) : North Korea
  - (silver) : France
  - (bronze) : Japan
  - 4th: United States

=== Multi-sports events ===
==== Men ====
- 3–19 August: Football at the 2016 Summer Olympics – Men's tournament in Rio de Janeiro, Brazil
  - (gold) : Brazil
  - (silver) : Germany
  - (bronze) : Nigeria
  - 4th: Honduras

==== Women ====
- 3–19 August: Football at the 2016 Summer Olympics – Women's tournament in Rio de Janeiro, Brazil
  - (gold) : Germany
  - (silver) : Sweden
  - (bronze) : Canada
  - 4th: Brazil

== Fixed dates for national team matches ==
Scheduled international matches per their International Match Calendar. Also known as FIFA International Day/Date(s).

- 21–29 March
- 30 May – 7 June (non-UEFA confederations)
- 29 August – 5 September
- 3–11 October
- 7–15 November

== Club continental champions ==
=== Men ===
| Region | Tournament | Defending champion | Champion | Title | Last honor |
|---|---|---|---|---|---|
| AFC (Asia) | 2016 AFC Champions League | (China) Guangzhou Evergrande | (South Korea) Jeonbuk Hyundai Motors | 2 | 2006 |
| AFC (Asia) | 2016 AFC Cup | (Malaysia) Johor Darul Ta'zim | (Iraq) Al-Quwa Al-Jawiya | 1 | — |
| CAF (Africa) | 2016 CAF Champions League | (Democratic Republic of the Congo) TP Mazembe | (South Africa) Mamelodi Sundowns | 1 | — |
| CAF (Africa) | 2016 CAF Confederation Cup | (Tunisia) Étoile du Sahel | (Democratic Republic of the Congo) TP Mazembe | 1 | — |
| CAF (Africa) | 2016 CAF Super Cup | (Algeria) ES Sétif | (Democratic Republic of the Congo) TP Mazembe | 3 | 2011 |
| CONCACAF (North and Central America, Caribbean) | 2015–16 CONCACAF Champions League | (Mexico) América | (Mexico) América | 7 | 2014–15 |
| CONCACAF (North and Central America, Caribbean) | 2016 CFU Club Championship | (Trinidad and Tobago) Central | (Trinidad and Tobago) Central | 2 | 2015 |
| CONMEBOL (South America) | 2016 Copa Libertadores | (Argentina) River Plate | (Colombia) Atlético Nacional | 2 | 1989 |
| CONMEBOL (South America) | 2016 Copa Sudamericana | (Colombia) Santa Fe | (Brazil) Chapecoense (Note: The final was never played; the plane that was carrying Chapecoense to the first leg against Colombia's Atlético Nacional crashed, killing almost all of the team. In the days following the disaster, Atlético Nacional campaigned for Chapecoense to be awarded the title, and CONMEBOL did so on 5 December.) | 1 | — |
| CONMEBOL (South America) | 2016 Recopa Sudamericana | (Argentina) River Plate | (Argentina) River Plate | 2 | 2015 |
| OFC (Oceania) | 2016 OFC Champions League | (New Zealand) Auckland City | (New Zealand) Auckland City | 8 | 2014–15 |
| UEFA (Europe) | 2015–16 UEFA Champions League | (Spain) Barcelona | (Spain) Real Madrid | 11 | 2013–14 |
| UEFA (Europe) | 2015–16 UEFA Europa League | (Spain) Sevilla | (Spain) Sevilla | 5 | 2014–15 |
| UEFA (Europe) | 2016 UEFA Super Cup | (Spain) Barcelona | (Spain) Real Madrid | 3 | 2014 |
| UAFA (Arab States) | 2015–16 UAFA Club Cup | (Algeria) USM Alger | Not held | | |
| UAFA (Arab States) | 2016 GCC Club Cup | (United Arab Emirates) Al-Shabab | Not held | | |
| FIFA (Worldwide) | 2016 FIFA Club World Cup | (Spain) Barcelona | (Spain) Real Madrid | 2 | 2014 |

=== Women ===
| Region | Tournament | Champion | Title | Last honor |
|---|---|---|---|---|
| CONMEBOL (South America) | 2016 Copa Libertadores Femenina | (Paraguay) Sportivo Limpeño | 1 | — |
| UEFA (Europe) | 2015–16 UEFA Women's Champions League | (France) Lyon | 3 | 2011–12 |

== Domestic leagues ==
=== UEFA nations ===
==== Men ====
| Nation | Tournament | Champion | Title | Last honor |
|---|---|---|---|---|
| Albania | 2015–16 Albanian Superliga | Skënderbeu Korçë | 7 | 2014–15 |
| Andorra | 2015–16 Primera Divisió | FC Santa Coloma | 10 | 2014–15 |
| Armenia | 2015–16 Armenian Premier League | Alashkert | 1 | — |
| Austria | 2015–16 Austrian Football Bundesliga | Red Bull Salzburg | 10 | 2014–15 |
| Azerbaijan | 2015–16 Azerbaijan Premier League | Qarabağ | 4 | 2014–15 |
| Belarus | 2016 Belarusian Premier League | BATE Borisov | 13 | 2015 |
| Belgium | 2015–16 Belgian Pro League | Club Brugge | 14 | 2004–05 |
| Bosnia and Herzegovina | 2015–16 Premier League of Bosnia and Herzegovina | Zrinjski Mostar | 4 | 2013–14 |
| Bulgaria | 2015–16 A Group | Ludogorets Razgrad | 5 | 2014–15 |
| (Republic of Crimea (Russia)) Crimea | 2015–16 Crimean Premier League | Simferopol | 1 | — |
| Croatia | 2015–16 Croatian First Football League | Dinamo Zagreb | 18 | 2014–15 |
| Cyprus | 2015–16 Cypriot First Division | APOEL | 25 | 2014–15 |
| Czech Republic | 2015–16 Czech First League | Viktoria Plzeň | 4 | 2014–15 |
| Denmark | 2015–16 Danish Superliga | Copenhagen | 11 | 2012–13 |
| England | 2015–16 Premier League | Leicester City | 1 | — |
| Estonia | 2016 Meistriliiga | Infonet | 1 | — |
| Faroe Islands | 2016 Effodeildin | Víkingur Gøta | 1 | — |
| Finland | 2016 Veikkausliiga | IFK Mariehamn | 1 | — |
| France | 2015–16 Ligue 1 | Paris Saint-Germain | 6 | 2014–15 |
| (Georgia (country)) Georgia | 2015–16 Umaglesi Liga | Dinamo Tbilisi | 16 | 2013–14 |
| (Georgia (country)) Georgia | 2016 Umaglesi Liga (Note: Georgia transitioned from an autumn-spring season spanning two calendar years to a spring-autumn season contained within a single calendar year. To that effect, an abbreviated 2016 season was held in autumn.) | Samtredia | 1 | — |
| Germany | 2015–16 Bundesliga | Bayern Munich | 26 | 2014–15 |
| Gibraltar | 2015–16 Gibraltar Premier Division | Lincoln Red Imps | 22 | 2014–15 |
| Greece | 2015–16 Super League Greece | Olympiacos | 43 | 2014–15 |
| Hungary | 2015–16 Nemzeti Bajnokság I | Ferencváros | 29 | 2003–04 |
| Iceland | 2016 Úrvalsdeild | FH | 8 | 2015 |
| (Republic of Ireland) Ireland | 2016 League of Ireland Premier Division | Dundalk | 12 | 2015 |
| Israel | 2015–16 Israeli Premier League | Hapoel Be'er Sheva | 3 | 1975–76 |
| Italy | 2015–16 Serie A | Juventus | 32 | 2014–15 |
| Kazakhstan | 2016 Kazakhstan Premier League | Astana | 3 | 2015 |
| Kosovo | 2015–16 Football Superleague of Kosovo | Feronikeli | 1 | — |
| Latvia | 2016 Latvian Higher League | Spartaks Jūrmala | 1 | — |
| Lithuania | 2016 A Lyga | Žalgiris Vilnius | 7 | 2015 |
| Luxembourg | 2015–16 Luxembourg National Division | F91 Dudelange | 12 (Note: Does not include 10 national titles won by predecessor club Stade Dudelange.) | 2013–14 |
| (North Macedonia) Macedonia | 2015–16 Macedonian First Football League | Vardar | 11 | 2014–15 |
| Malta | 2015–16 Maltese Premier League | Valletta | 23 | 2013–14 |
| Moldova | 2015–16 Moldovan National Division | Sheriff Tiraspol | 14 | 2013–14 |
| Monaco | 2015–16 Challenge Prince Rainier III | Ribeiro Frères | 2 | 2014–15 |
| Montenegro | 2015–16 Montenegrin First League | Mladost Podgorica | 1 | — |
| Netherlands | 2015–16 Eredivisie | PSV | 23 | 2014–15 |
| Northern Cyprus | 2015–16 TFF Süper Lig | Mağusa Türk Gücü | 1 | — |
| Northern Ireland | 2015–16 NIFL Premiership | Crusaders | 6 | 2014–15 |
| Norway | 2016 Tippeligaen | Rosenborg | 24 | 2015 |
| Poland | 2015–16 Ekstraklasa | Legia Warsaw | 11 | 2013–14 |
| Portugal | 2015–16 Primeira Liga | Benfica | 35 | 2014–15 |
| Romania | 2015–16 Liga I | Astra Giurgiu | 1 | — |
| Russia | 2015–16 Russian Premier League | CSKA Moscow | 13 | 2013–14 |
| San Marino | 2015–16 Campionato Sammarinese di Calcio | Tre Penne | 3 | 2012–13 |
| Scotland | 2015–16 Scottish Premiership | Celtic | 47 | 2014–15 |
| Serbia | 2015–16 Serbian SuperLiga | Red Star Belgrade | 27 | 2013–14 |
| Slovakia | 2015–16 Slovak First Football League | Trenčín | 2 | 2014–15 |
| Slovenia | 2015–16 Slovenian PrvaLiga | Olimpija Ljubljana | 1 | — |
| Spain | 2015–16 La Liga | FC Barcelona | 24 | 2014–15 |
| Sweden | 2016 Allsvenskan | Malmö | 19 | 2014 |
| Switzerland | 2015–16 Swiss Super League | FC Basel | 19 | 2014–15 |
| Turkey | 2015–16 Süper Lig | Beşiktaş | 14 | 2008–09 |
| Ukraine | 2015–16 Ukrainian Premier League | Dynamo Kyiv | 15 | 2014–15 |
| Vatican City | 2015–16 Vatican City Championship | Musei Vaticani | 2 | 2014–15 |
| Wales | 2015–16 Welsh Premier League | The New Saints | 10 | 2014–15 |

==== Women ====
| Nation | Tournament | Champion | Title | Last honor |
|---|---|---|---|---|
| Albania | 2015–16 Albanian Women's National Championship | KF Vllaznia | 3 | 2014–15 |
| Austria | 2015–16 ÖFB-Frauenliga | St. Pölten-Spratzern | 2 | 2014–15 |
| Belarus | 2016 Belarusian Premier League | FC Minsk | 4 | 2014–15 |
| Belgium | 2015–16 Super League | Standard Liège | 1 (Note: The 2015–16 season was the first for the Belgian Super League after the Belgian and Dutch associations scrapped the BeNe League, a joint top-level league that operated from 2012–13 through 2014–15. Standard also has 15 championships in the Belgian Women's First Division, which was the country's top level before the creation of the BeNe League and now occupies the second level of Belgium's women's football pyramid. In addition, Standard was the top-placing Belgian team in all three seasons of the BeNe League, giving them three more national championships.) | — (Note: Standard's last championship in Belgium's top level came in 2011–12, the final season before the creation of the BeNe League.) |
| Bosnia and Herzegovina | 2015–16 Ženska Premijer Liga BiH | SFK 2000 | 14 | 2014–15 |
| Bulgaria | 2015–16 Bulgarian women's football championship | FC NSA Sofia | 12 | 2014–15 |
| Croatia | 2015–16 Prva HNLŽ | Osijek | 20 | 2014–15 |
| Cyprus | 2015–16 Cypriot First Division | Apollon Limassol | 8 | 2014–15 |
| Czech Republic | 2015–16 Czech First Division | Slavia Praha | 5 | 2014–15 |
| Denmark | 2015–16 Elitedivisionen | Fortuna Hjørring | 9 | 2013–14 |
| England | 2016 FA WSL 1 | Manchester City | 1 | — |
| Estonia | 2016 Naiste Meistriliiga | Pärnu JK | 7 | 2015 |
| Faroe Islands | 2016 1. deild kvinnur | Klaksvíkar Ítróttarfelag | 18 | 2015 |
| Finland | 2016 Naisten Liiga | PK-35 Vantaa | 6 | 2015 |
| France | 2015–16 Division 1 Féminine | Lyon | 14 | 2014–15 |
| (Georgia (country)) Georgia | 2016 Georgia women's football championship | FC Martve | 1 | — |
| Germany | 2015–16 Frauen-Bundesliga | Bayern Munich | 2 | 2014–15 |
| Gibraltar | 2016 Gibraltar Women's Football League | Manchester 62 | 2 | 2014 |
| Greece | 2016 Greek A Division | P.A.O.K. F.C. | 11 | 2015 |
| Hungary | 2016 Női NB I | Ferencváros | 2 | 2015 |
| Iceland | 2016 Úrvalsdeild | Stjarnan | 4 | 2014 |
| (Republic of Ireland) Ireland | 2015–16 Women's National League | Wexford Youths | 2 | 2014–15 |
| (Republic of Ireland) Ireland | 2016 Women's National League (Note: In women's football, the Republic of Ireland transitioned from an autumn-spring season spanning two calendar years to a spring-autumn season contained within a single calendar year, a format long used by the country's men's leagues. To that effect, an abbreviated 2016 season was held in autumn.) | Shelbourne Ladies | 1 | — |
| Israel | 2015–16 Ligat Nashim | Ramat HaSharon | 1 | — |
| Italy | 2015–16 Serie A | Brescia | 2 | 2013–14 |
| Kazakhstan | 2016 Kazakhstani women's football championship | BIIK Kazygurt | 5 | 2015 |
| Latvia | 2016 Latvian Women's League | Rīgas FS | 4 | 2015 |
| Lithuania | 2016 A Lyga | Gintra-Universitetas | 15 | 2015 |
| Luxembourg | 2015-16 Dames Ligue 1 | Jeunesse Junglinster | 5 | 2014-15 |
| Malta | 2015-16 Maltese First Division | Hibernians | 11 | 2014-15 |
| Moldova | 2015-16 Moldovan women's football championship | ARF Criuleni | 1 | — |
| Montenegro | 2015-16 Montenegrin Women's League | Breznica Pljevlja | 1 | — |
| Netherlands | 2015–16 Eredivisie | Twente | 2 (Note: Includes only Eredivisie titles. Twente was the top-placing Dutch team in all three seasons of the BeNe League.) | 2010–11 (Note: Date reflects Twente's previous Eredivisie championship.) |
| (North Macedonia) Macedonia | 2015-16 Macedonian women's football championship | ŽFK Dragon 2014 | 2 | 2014-15 |
| Northern Ireland | 2015-16 Women's Premiership | Linfield Ladies F.C. | 1 | — |
| Norway | 2016 Toppserien | LSK Kvinner | 4 | 2015 |
| Poland | 2016 Ekstraliga | KKPK Medyk Konin | 3 | 2015 |
| Portugal | 2015–16 Campeonato Nacional | Benfica | 2 | 2014–15 |
| Romania | 2015–16 Superliga | Olimpia Cluj | 6 | 2014–15 |
| Russia | 2016 Championship | Rossiyanka | 5 | 2011–12 |
| Scotland | 2016 SWPL 1 (Note: The 2016 season was the first for SWPL 1, the new top flight of the Scottish Women's Premier League.) | Glasgow City | 1 (Note: Does not include 9 titles won by Glasgow City prior to the split of the SWPL into two divisions after the 2015 season.) | — |
| Serbia | 2015–16 Serbian SuperLiga | ŽFK Spartak Subotica | 6 | 2014–15 |
| Slovakia | 2015–16 Slovak Women's First League | Slovan Bratislava | 12 | 2011–12 |
| Slovenia | 2015–16 Slovenian Women's League | Pomurje Beltinci | 6 | 2014–15 |
| Spain | 2015–16 Primera División | Athletic Bilbao | 5 | 2006–07 |
| Sweden | 2016 Damallsvenskan | Linköping | 2 | 2009 |
| Switzerland | 2016 Swiss Women's Super League | Zürich Frauen | 7 | 2015 |
| Turkey | 2015–16 Turkish Women's First Football League | Konak Belediyespor | 4 | 2014-15 |
| Ukraine | 2016 Vyshcha Liha | Zhytlobud-2 Kharkiv | 1 | — |
| Wales | 2015–16 Welsh Premier League | Cardiff Met. Ladies | 3 | 2014–15 |

=== CONMEBOL nations ===
| Nation | Tournament | Champion | Title | Last honor |
|---|---|---|---|---|
| Argentina | 2016 Argentine Primera División | Lanús | 2 | 2007 Apertura |
| Bolivia | 2016 Liga de Fútbol Profesional Boliviano Clausura | Jorge Wilstermann | 12 | 2010 Apertura |
| Bolivia | 2016 Liga de Fútbol Profesional Boliviano Apertura | The Strongest | 12 | 2013 Apertura |
| Brazil | 2016 Campeonato Brasileiro Série A | Palmeiras | 9 | 1994 |
| Chile | 2016 Chilean Primera División Clausura | Universidad Católica | 11 | 2010 |
| Chile | 2016 Chilean Primera División Apertura | Universidad Católica | 12 | 2016 Clausura |
| Colombia | 2016 Categoría Primera A Apertura | Independiente Medellín | 6 | 2009 Finalización |
| Colombia | 2016 Categoría Primera A Finalización | Santa Fe | 9 | 2014 Finalización |
| Ecuador | 2016 Campeonato Ecuatoriano de Fútbol Serie A | Barcelona | 15 | 2012 |
| Paraguay | 2016 Paraguayan Primera División Apertura | Libertad | 19 | 2014 Clausura |
| Paraguay | 2016 Paraguayan Primera División Clausura | Guaraní | 11 | 2010 Apertura |
| Peru | 2016 Torneo Descentralizado | Sporting Cristal | 18 | 2014 |
| Uruguay | 2015–16 Uruguayan Primera División | Peñarol | 43 | 2012–13 |
| Uruguay | 2016 Uruguayan Primera División | Nacional | 46 | 2014–15 |
| Venezuela | 2016 Venezuelan Primera División | Zamora | 4 | 2015 |

=== CONCACAF nations ===
==== Men ====
| Nation | Tournament | Champion | Title | Last honor |
|---|---|---|---|---|
| Anguilla | 2015–16 AFA Senior Male League | Salsa Ballers FC | 1 | — |
| Aruba | 2015–16 Aruban Division di Honor | SV Racing Club Aruba | 15 | 2014–15 |
| Antigua and Barbuda | 2015–16 Antigua and Barbuda Premier Division | Hoppers | 1 | — |
| (The Bahamas) Bahamas | 2015–16 BFA Senior League | Bears FC | 7 | 2013 |
| Barbados | 2016 Barbados Premier Division | UWI Blackbirds | 1 | — |
| Belize | 2016 Closing Season | Belmopan Bandits | 5 | 2014 Opening |
| Belize | 2016 Opening Season | Belmopan Bandits | 6 | 2016 Closing |
| Bermuda | 2015-16 Bermudian Premier Division | Dandy Town Hornets | 8 | 2013–14 |
| Bonaire | 2015–16 Bonaire League | Atlétiko Flamingo | 1 | — |
| British Virgin Islands | 2015–16 BVIFA National Football League | Sugar Boys | 1 | — |
| Cayman Islands | 2015–16 Cayman Islands Premier League | Scholars International | 10 | 2014–15 |
| Costa Rica | 2016 Verano | Herediano | 25 | Verano 2015 |
| Costa Rica | 2016 Invierno | | | |
| Cuba | 2016 Campeonato Nacional de Fútbol de Cuba | Villa Clara | 14 | 2013 |
| Curaçao | 2016 Curaçao League | RKSV Centro Dominguito | 5 | 2015 |
| Dominica | 2015–16 Dominica Premiere League | Dublanc FC | 2 | 2005 |
| Dominican Republic | 2016 Liga Dominicana de Fútbol | Barcelona Atlético | 1 | — |
| El Salvador | Clausura 2016 | Dragón | 3 | 1953 |
| El Salvador | Apertura 2016 | | | |
| French Guiana | 2015–16 French Guiana Championnat National | US de Matoury | 6 | 2013–14 |
| Grenada | 2016 Grenada League | | | |
| Guadeloupe | 2015–16 Guadeloupe Division d’Honneur | Unité Sainte-Rosienne | 1 | — |
| Guatemala | Clausura 2016 | Suchitepéquez | 2 | 1983 |
| Guatemala | Apertura 2016 | | | |
| Guyana | 2015–16 GFF Elite League | Slingerz | 1 | — |
| Honduras | Clausura 2016 | Olimpia | 30 | Clausura 2015 |
| Honduras | Apertura 2016 | | | |
| Haiti | Ouverture 2016 | Racing FC | 3 | Clôture 2008 |
| Haiti | Clôture 2016 | | | |
| Jamaica | 2015–16 National Premier League | Montego Bay United | 4 | 2013–14 |
| Martinique | 2015–16 Martinique Championnat National | Golden Lion | 2 | 2014–15 |
| Mexico | 2016 Liga MX Clausura | Pachuca | 6 | Clausura 2007 |
| Mexico | 2016 Liga MX Apertura | UANL | 5 | Apertura 2015 |
| Montserrat | 2015–16 Montserrat Championship | Royal Montserrat Police Force | 5 | 2002–03 |
| Nicaragua | Clausura 2016 | Real Estelí | 14 | Clausura 2015 |
| Nicaragua | Apertura 2016 | Real Estelí | 15 | Clausura 2016 |
| Panama | Clausura 2016 | Plaza Amador | 6 | 2005 |
| Panama | Apertura 2016 | | | |
| Saint Kitts and Nevis | 2015–16 Saint Kitts Premier Division | Cayon Rockets | 2 | 2001–02 |
| Saint Lucia | 2015–16 Saint Lucia Gold Division | | | |
| (Collectivity of Saint Martin) Saint Martin | 2015–16 Saint-Martin Championships | Marigot | 1 | — |
| Saint Vincent and the Grenadines | 2016 NLA Premier League | System 3 | 1 | — |
| Suriname | 2015–16 SVB Hoofdklasse | Inter Moengotapoe | 7 | 2014–15 |
| Turks and Caicos Islands | 2015–16 WIV Provo Premier League | AFC Academy | 4 | 2014–15 |
| Trinidad and Tobago | 2015–16 TT Pro League | Central | 2 | 2014–15 |
| (United States Virgin Islands) U.S. Virgin Islands | 2015–16 U.S. Virgin Islands Championship | Raymix | 1 | — |
| United States & Canada | 2016 Major League Soccer | Seattle Sounders FC | 1 | — |
| United States & Canada | 2016 Major League Soccer Supporters' Shield | FC Dallas | 1 | — |

==== Women ====
| Nation | Tournament | Champion | Title | Last honor |
|---|---|---|---|---|
| United States | 2016 National Women's Soccer League | Western New York Flash (Note: Following the 2016 season, the Flash sold its NWSL franchise rights to interests in the Research Triangle area of North Carolina, which relaunched the franchise as the North Carolina Courage. The Flash continue to operate in the de facto second-division United Women's Soccer.) | 1 (Note: Does not include championships won in two now-defunct top-level leagues—Women's Professional Soccer (2011) and WPSL Elite (2012).) | — |

=== AFC nations ===
==== Men ====
| Nation | Tournament | Champion | Title | Last honor |
|---|---|---|---|---|
| Australia | 2015–16 A-League | Adelaide United | 1st | — |
| Bahrain | 2015–16 Bahraini Premier League | Al-Hidd | 1 | — |
| Iraq | 2015–16 Iraqi Premier League | Al-Zawra'a | 13 | 2010–11 |
| Jordan | 2015–16 Jordan League | Al-Wehdat | 15 | 2014–15 |
| Kuwait | 2015–16 Kuwaiti Premier League | Qadsia | 17 | 2013–14 |
| Lebanon | 2015–16 Lebanese Premier League | Al-Safa | 3 | 2012–13 |
| Oman | 2015–16 Oman Professional League | Fanja | 9 | 2011–12 |
| Palestine | 2015–16 West Bank Premier League | Shabab Al-Khalil | 3 | 1984-85 |
| Qatar | 2015–16 Qatar Stars League | Al-Rayan | 8 | 1994–95 |
| Saudi Arabia | 2015–16 Saudi Professional League | Al-Ahli | 3 | 1983–84 |
| Syria | 2015–16 Syrian Premier League | Al-Jaish | 14 | 2014–15 |
| United Arab Emirates | 2015–16 UAE Pro-League | Al-Ahli Dubai | 7 | 2013–14 |
| Afghanistan | 2016 Afghan Premier League | Shaheen Asmayee | 3 | 2014 |
| Iran | 2015–16 Persian Gulf Pro League | Esteghlal Khuzestan | 1 | — |
| Kyrgyzstan | 2016 Kyrgyzstan League | Alay Osh | 3 | 2015 |
| Tajikistan | 2016 Tajik League | Istiklol | 5 | 2015 |
| Turkmenistan | 2016 Ýokary Liga | Altyn Asyr | 3 | 2015 |
| Uzbekistan | 2016 Uzbek League | Lokomotiv Tashkent | 1 | — |
| Bangladesh | 2016 Bangladesh Football Premier League | Dhaka Abahani | 5 | 2012 |
| Bhutan | 2016 Bhutan National League | Thimphu City | 1 | — |
| India | 2015–16 I-League | Bengaluru FC | 2 | 2013–14 |
| Maldives | 2016 Dhivehi Premier League | Maziya | 1 | — |
| China | 2016 Chinese Super League | Guangzhou Evergrande Taobao | 6 | 2015 |
| Guam | 2015–16 Guam Men's Soccer League | Rovers | 3 | 2014–15 |
| Hong Kong | 2015–16 Hong Kong Premier League | Eastern Sports Club | 5 | 1994–95 |
| Japan | 2016 J1 League | Kashima Antlers | 8 | 2009 |
| North Korea | 2016 DPR Korea League | Hwaebul | 2 | 2014 |
| South Korea | 2016 K League Classic | FC Seoul | 6 | 2012 |
| Macau | 2016 Campeonato da 1ª Divisão do Futebol | Benfica de Macau | 3 | 2015 |
| Mongolia | 2016 Mongolian Premier League | Erchim | 10 | 2015 |
| Northern Mariana Islands | 2015–16 M*League Division 1 | Tan Holdings | 3 | 2014–15 |
| (Chinese Taipei) Taiwan | 2015–16 Intercity Football League | Taiwan Power Company | 21 | 2014 |
| Brunei | 2016 Brunei Super League | MS ABDB | 2 | 2015 |
| Cambodia | 2016 Cambodian League | Boeung Ket Angkor | 2 | 2012 |
| Indonesia | 2016 Indonesia Soccer Championship A | Persipura Jayapura | 1 | — |
| Laos | 2016 Lao Premier League | Lanexang United | 1 | — |
| Malaysia | 2016 Malaysia Super League | Johor Darul Ta'zim | 3 | 2015 |
| Myanmar | 2016 Myanmar National League | Yadanarbon | 4 | 2014 |
| Philippines | 2016 United Football League | Global | 3 | 2014 |
| Singapore | 2016 S.League | Albirex Niigata Singapore | 1 | — |
| Thailand | 2016 Thai Premier League | Muangthong United | 4 | 2012 |
| (Timor-Leste) East Timor | 2016 Liga Futebol Amadora | SLB Laulara | 1 | — |
| Vietnam | 2016 V.League 1 | Hà Nội T&T | 3 | 2013 |

==== Women ====
| Nation | Tournament | Champion | Title | Last honor |
|---|---|---|---|---|
| Australia | 2015–16 W-League | Melbourne City | 1 | — |
| Iraq | 2015–16 Iraqi Women's Football League | Ghaz Al-Shamal | 1 | — |
| Japan | 2016 Nadeshiko League Division 1 | NTV Beleza | 14 | 2015 |

=== CAF nations ===
| Nation | Tournament | Champion | Title | Last honor |
|---|---|---|---|---|
| Algeria | 2015–16 Algerian Ligue Professionnelle 1 | USM Alger | 7 | 2013–14 |
| Egypt | 2015–16 Egyptian Premier League | Al Ahly | 38 | 2013–14 |
| Libya | 2016 Libyan Premier League | Al-Ahli Tripoli | 12 | 2013–14 |
| Morocco | 2015–16 Botola | FUS Rabat | 1 | — |
| Tunisia | 2015–16 Tunisian Ligue Professionnelle 1 | Étoile du Sahel | 10 | 2006–07 |
| Benin | 2016 Benin Premier League | Abandoned | | |
| Burkina Faso | 2015–16 Burkinabé Premier League | RCK | 2 | 2004–05 |
| Cape Verde | 2016 Campeonato Nacional de Cabo Verde | CS Mindelense | 12 | 2015 |
| (The Gambia) Gambia | 2015–16 GFA League First Division | Gambia Ports Authority | 6 | 2009–10 |
| Ghana | 2016 Ghanaian Premier League | All Stars | 1 | — |
| Guinea | 2015–16 Guinée Championnat National | Horoya | 14 | 2014–15 |
| Guinea-Bissau | 2016 Campeonato Nacional da Guiné-Bissau | | | |
| Ivory Coast | 2015–16 Ligue 1 | Tanda | 2 | 2014–15 |
| Liberia | 2016 Liberian First Division League | Barrack Young Controllers | 3 | 2014 |
| Mali | 2015–16 Malian Première Division | Stade Malien | 21 | 2014–15 |
| Mauritania | 2015–16 Mauritanian Premier League | FC Tevragh-Zeina | 3 | 2014–15 |
| Niger | 2015–16 Niger Premier League | AS FAN | 4 | 2010 |
| Nigeria | 2016 Nigeria Professional Football League | Enugu Rangers | 7 | 1984 |
| Senegal | 2015–16 Senegal Premier League | Gorée | 4 | 1983–84 |
| Sierra Leone | 2015–16 Sierra Leone National Premier League | | | |
| Togo | 2016 Togolese Championnat National | | | |
| Cameroon | 2016 Elite One | UMS de Loum | 1 | — |
| Central African Republic | 2015–16 Central African Republic League | DFC 8 | 3 | 2011 |
| Chad | 2016 Chad Premier League | Gazelle FC | 4 | 2015 |
| (Republic of the Congo) Congo | 2016 Ligue 1 | AC Léopards | 5 | 2015 |
| (Democratic Republic of the Congo) DR Congo | 2015–16 Linafoot | TP Mazembe | 15 | 2013–14 |
| Equatorial Guinea | 2016 Liga Semiprofesional de Guinea Ecuatorial | Sony de Elá Nguema | 16 | 2014 |
| Gabon | 2015–16 Gabon Championnat National D1 | CF Mounana | 2 | 2011–12 |
| São Tomé and Príncipe | 2016 São Tomé and Príncipe Championship | | | |
| Burundi | 2015–16 Burundi Premier League | Vital'O | 20 | 2014–15 |
| Djibouti | 2015-16 Djibouti Premier League | Djibouti Télécom | 5 | 2014–15 |
| Eritrea | 2016 Eritrean Premier League | | | |
| Ethiopia | 2015–16 Ethiopian Premier League | Kedus Giorgis | 28 | 2014–15 |
| Kenya | 2016 Kenyan Premier League | Tusker | 11 | 2012 |
| Rwanda | 2015–16 Rwanda National Football League | APR | 16 | 2014–15 |
| Somalia | 2015–16 Somali First Division | Banadir | 6 | 2013–14 |
| South Sudan | 2016 South Sudan Football Championship | | | |
| Sudan | 2016 Sudan Premier League | Al-Hilal Club | 26 | 2014 |
| Tanzania | 2015–16 Tanzanian Premier League | Young Africans | 21 | 2014–15 |
| Uganda | 2015–16 Uganda Super League | KCCA | 11 | 2014 |
| Zanzibar | 2016 Zanzibar Premier League | Zimamoto | 1 | — |
| Angola | 2016 Girabola | 1º de Agosto | 1 | — |
| Botswana | 2015–16 Botswana Premier League | Township Rollers | 13 | 2013–14 |
| Comoros | 2016 Comoros Premier League | Ngaya Club | 1 | — |
| Lesotho | 2015–16 Lesotho Premier League | Lioli | 5 | 2014–15 |
| Madagascar | 2016 THB Champions League | CNaPS Sport | 5 | 2015 |
| Malawi | 2015–16 Malawi Premier Division | | | |
| Mauritius | 2016 Mauritian League | AS Port-Louis 2000 | 6 | 2011 |
| Mozambique | 2016 Moçambola | Ferroviário Beira | 1 | — |
| Namibia | 2015–16 Namibia Premier League | Tigers SC | 2 | 1985 |
| Seychelles | 2016 Seychelles First Division | St Michel United FC | 14 | 2015 |
| South Africa | 2015–16 South African Premier Division | Mamelodi Sundowns | 7 | 2013–14 |
| (Eswatini) Swaziland | 2015–16 Swazi Premier League | Royal Leopards | 6 | 2014–15 |
| Zambia | 2016 Zambian Premier League | Zanaco | 7 | 2012 |
| Zimbabwe | 2016 Zimbabwe Premier Soccer League | CAPS United | 5 | 2005 |
| Réunion | 2016 Réunion Premier League | | | |

=== OFC nations ===
| Nation | Tournament | Champion | Title | Last honor |
|---|---|---|---|---|
| New Zealand | 2015–16 ASB Premiership | Team Wellington | 1 | — |
| Samoa | 2015–16 Samoa National League | | | |
| Solomon Islands | 2015–16 Solomon Islands S-League | Solomon Warriors | 3 | 2013–14 |
| (French Polynesia) Tahiti | 2015–16 Tahiti Ligue 1 | Tefana | 5 | 2014–15 |
| Vanuatu | 2015–16 TVL League | | | |
| American Samoa | 2016 FFAS Senior League | Pago Youth | 5 | 2012 |
| Cook Islands | 2016 Cook Islands Round Cup | Puaikura | 4 | 2013 |
| Fiji | 2016 Fiji National Football League | Ba | 20 | 2013 |
| Kiribati | 2016 Kiribati National Championship | | | |
| New Caledonia | 2016 New Caledonia Super Ligue | | | |
| Niue | 2016 Niue Soccer Tournament | | | |
| Papua New Guinea | 2015–16 Papua New Guinea National Soccer League | Lae City Dwellers | 2 | 2015 |
| Tonga | 2015–16 Tonga Major League | Veitongo | 4 | 2015 |
| Tuvalu | 2016 Tuvalu A-Division | | | |

== Domestic cups ==
=== UEFA nations ===
==== Men ====
| Nation | Tournament | Champion | Title | Last honor |
|---|---|---|---|---|
| Albania | 2015–16 Albanian Cup | Kukësi | 1 | — |
| Albania | 2016 Albanian Supercup | Kukësi | 1 | — |
| Andorra | 2016 Copa Constitució | UE Santa Coloma | 2 | 2013 |
| Andorra | 2016 Andorran Supercup | UE Santa Coloma | 1 | — |
| Armenia | 2015–16 Armenian Cup | Banants | 3 | 2007 |
| Armenia | 2016 Armenian Supercup | Alashkert | 1 | — |
| Austria | 2015–16 Austrian Cup | Red Bull Salzburg | 4 | 2014–15 |
| Azerbaijan | 2015–16 Azerbaijan Cup | Qarabağ | 5 | 2014–15 |
| Belarus | 2015–16 Belarusian Cup | Torpedo-BelAZ Zhodino | 1 | — |
| Belarus | 2016 Belarusian Super Cup | BATE Borisov | 6 | 2015 |
| Belgium | 2015–16 Belgian Cup | Standard Liège | 7 | 2010–11 |
| Belgium | 2016 Belgian Super Cup | Club Brugge | 14 | 2005 |
| Bosnia and Herzegovina | 2015–16 Bosnia and Herzegovina Football Cup | Radnik Bijeljina | 1 | — |
| Bulgaria | 2015–16 Bulgarian Cup | CSKA Sofia | 20 | 2010–11 |
| Bulgaria | 2016 Bulgarian Supercup | Canceled | | |
| Croatia | 2015–16 Croatian Football Cup | Dinamo Zagreb | 14 | 2014–15 |
| Cyprus | 2015–16 Cypriot Cup | Apollon Limassol | 8 | 2012–13 |
| Cyprus | 2016 Cypriot Super Cup | Apollon Limassol | 4 | 1985 |
| Czech Republic | 2015–16 Czech Cup | Mladá Boleslav | 2 | 2010–11 |
| Czech Republic | 2016 Czech Supercup | | | |
| Denmark | 2015–16 Danish Cup | Copenhagen | 7 | 2014–15 |
| England | 2015–16 FA Cup | Manchester United | 12 | 2003–04 |
| England | 2015–16 Football League Cup | Manchester City | 4 | 2013–14 |
| England | 2016 FA Community Shield | Manchester United | 21 | 2013 |
| Estonia | 2015–16 Estonian Cup | Flora | 7 | 2012–13 |
| Estonia | 2016 Estonian Supercup | Flora | 9 | 2014 |
| Finland | 2016 Finnish Cup | SJK | 1 | — |
| Finland | 2016 Finnish League Cup | Lahti | 3 | 2013 |
| Faroe Islands | 2016 Faroe Islands Cup | KÍ | 6 | 1999 |
| Faroe Islands | 2016 Faroe Islands Super Cup | Víkingur Gøta | 3 | 2015 |
| France | 2015–16 Coupe de France | Paris Saint-Germain | 10 | 2014–15 |
| France | 2015–16 Coupe de la Ligue | Paris Saint-Germain | 6 | 2014–15 |
| France | 2016 Trophée des Champions | Paris Saint-Germain | 6 | 2015 |
| (Georgia (country)) Georgia | 2015–16 Georgian Cup | Dinamo Tbilisi | 13 | 2014–15 |
| (Georgia (country)) Georgia | 2016 Georgian Super Cup | | | |
| Germany | 2015–16 DFB-Pokal | Bayern Munich | 18 | 2013–14 |
| Germany | 2016 DFL-Supercup | Bayern Munich | 5 | 2012 |
| Gibraltar | 2016 Rock Cup | Lincoln Red Imps | 17 | 2015 |
| Greece | 2015–16 Greek Football Cup | AEK Athens | 15 | 2010–11 |
| Hungary | 2015–16 Magyar Kupa | Ferencváros | 22 | 2014–15 |
| Hungary | 2016 Szuperkupa | Ferencváros | 6 | 2015 |
| Iceland | 2016 Icelandic Cup | Valur | 11 | 2015 |
| Iceland | 2016 Icelandic League Cup | KR | 6 | 2012 |
| Iceland | 2016 Icelandic Super Cup | Valur | 9 | 2008 |
| Israel | 2015–16 Israel State Cup | Maccabi Haifa | 6 | 1997–98 |
| Israel | 2015–16 Toto Cup Al | Maccabi Petah Tikva | 4 | 2003–04 |
| Israel | 2016 Israel Super Cup | Hapoel Be'er Sheva | 2 | 1975 |
| Italy | 2015–16 Coppa Italia | Juventus | 11 | 2014–15 |
| Italy | 2016 Supercoppa Italiana | Milan | 7 | 2011 |
| Kazakhstan | 2016 Kazakhstan Cup | Astana | 3 | 2012 |
| Kazakhstan | 2016 Kazakhstan Super Cup | Kairat | 1 | — |
| Kosovo | 2015–16 Kosovar Cup | Prishtina | 5 | 2012–13 |
| Liechtenstein | 2015–16 Liechtenstein Cup | Vaduz | 44 | 2014–15 |
| Latvia | 2015–16 Latvian Football Cup | Jelgava | 5 | 2013–14 |
| Latvia | 2016 Virsligas Winter Cup | Liepāja | 1 | — |
| Lithuania | 2015–16 Lithuanian Football Cup | Žalgiris | 10 | 2014–15 |
| Lithuania | 2016 Lithuanian Supercup | Žalgiris | 5 | 2015 |
| Luxembourg | 2015–16 Luxembourg Cup | F91 Dudelange | 13 (Note: Does not include 2 cups titles won by predecessor club Alliance Dudelange,4 cups titles won by predecessor club Stade Dudelange, 1 Cup title won by predecessor club US Dudelange.) | 2011–12 |
| (North Macedonia) Macedonia | 2015–16 Macedonian Football Cup | Shkëndija | 1 | — |
| (North Macedonia) Macedonia | 2016 Macedonian Football Super Cup | | | |
| Malta | 2015–16 Maltese FA Trophy | Sliema Wanderers | 21 | 2008–09 |
| Malta | 2016 Maltese Super Cup | | | |
| Moldova | 2015–16 Moldovan Cup | Zaria Bălți | 1 | — |
| Moldova | 2016 Moldovan Super Cup | Sheriff Tiraspol | 7 | 2015 |
| Montenegro | 2015–16 Montenegrin Cup | Rudar Pljevlja | 4 | 2010–11 |
| Netherlands | 2015–16 KNVB Cup | Feyenoord | 12 | 2007–08 |
| Netherlands | 2016 Johan Cruyff Shield | PSV | 11 | 2015 |
| Northern Ireland | 2015–16 Irish Cup | Glenavon | 7 | 2013–14 |
| Northern Ireland | 2015–16 Northern Ireland Football League Cup | Cliftonville | 5 | 2014–15 |
| Northern Ireland | 2016 NIFL Charity Shield | Glenavon | 2 | 1992 |
| Norway | 2016 Norwegian Football Cup | Rosenborg | 11 | 2015 |
| Poland | 2015–16 Polish Cup | Legia Warsaw | 18 | 2014–15 |
| Poland | 2016 Polish SuperCup | Lech Poznań | 6 | 2015 |
| Portugal | 2015–16 Taça de Portugal | Braga | 2 | 1965–66 |
| Portugal | 2015–16 Taça da Liga | Benfica | 7 | 2014–15 |
| Portugal | 2016 Supertaça Cândido de Oliveira | Benfica | 6 | 2014 |
| (Republic of Ireland) Ireland | 2016 FAI Cup | Cork City | 3 | 2007 |
| (Republic of Ireland) Ireland | 2016 League of Ireland Cup | St Patrick's Athletic | 4 | 2015 |
| (Republic of Ireland) Ireland | 2016 President's Cup (super cup) | Cork City | 1 | — |
| Romania | 2015–16 Cupa României | Cluj | 4 | 2009–10 |
| Romania | 2015–16 Cupa Ligii | Steaua Bucharest | 2 | 2014–15 |
| Romania | 2016 Supercupa României | Astra Giurgiu | 2 | 2014 |
| Russia | 2015–16 Russian Cup | Zenit Saint Petersburg | 4 | 2009–10 |
| Russia | 2016 Russian Super Cup | Zenit Saint Petersburg | 5 | 2015 |
| San Marino | 2015–16 Coppa Titano | La Fiorita | 4 | 2012–13 |
| San Marino | 2016 Super Coppa Sammarinese | Tre Penne | 2 | 2013 |
| Scotland | 2015–16 Scottish Cup | Hibernian | 3 | 1901–02 |
| Scotland | 2015–16 Scottish League Cup | Ross County | 1 | — |
| Serbia | 2015–16 Serbian Cup | Partizan | 13 | 2010–11 |
| Slovakia | 2015–16 Slovak Cup | Trenčín | 3 | 2014–15 |
| Slovenia | 2015–16 Slovenian Football Cup | Maribor | 9 | 2012–13 |
| Spain | 2015–16 Copa del Rey | Barcelona | 28 | 2014–15 |
| Spain | 2016 Supercopa de España | Barcelona | 12 | 2013 |
| Sweden | 2015–16 Svenska Cupen | Häcken | 1 | — |
| Switzerland | 2015–16 Swiss Cup | Zürich | 9 | 2013–14 |
| Turkey | 2015–16 Turkish Cup | Galatasaray | 17 | 2014–15 |
| Turkey | 2016 Turkish Super Cup | Galatasaray | 15 | 2015 |
| Ukraine | 2015–16 Ukrainian Cup | Shakhtar | 10 | 2012–13 |
| Ukraine | 2016 Ukrainian Super Cup | Dynamo Kyiv | 6 | 2011 |
| Wales | 2015–16 Welsh Cup | The New Saints | 6 | 2014–15 |
| Wales | 2015–16 Welsh League Cup | The New Saints | 7 | 2014–15 |

==== Women ====
| Nation | Tournament | Champion | Title | Last honor |
|---|---|---|---|---|
| Denmark | 2015–16 Women's DBU Pokalen | Fortuna Hjørring | 8 | 2007–08 |
| England | 2015–16 FA Women's Cup | Arsenal | 14 | 2013–14 |
| Germany | 2015–16 Frauen DFB-Pokal | Wolfsburg | 3 | 2014–15 |
| Israel | 2015–16 Israeli Women's Cup | Kiryat Gat | 1 | — |
| Slovenia | 2015–16 Slovenian Women's Cup | Pomurje Beltinci | 6 | 2013–14 |
| Spain | 2016 Copa de la Reina | Atlético Madrid | 1 | — |
| Sweden | 2015–16 Svenska Cupen | Rosengård | 3 | 1997 |
| Switzerland | 2015–16 Swiss Women's Cup | FC Zürich Frauen | 11 | 2014-15 |

=== CONMEBOL nations ===
| Nation | Tournament | Champion | Title | Last honor |
|---|---|---|---|---|
| Argentina | 2015–16 Copa Argentina | River Plate | 1 | — |
| Brazil | 2016 Copa do Brasil | Grêmio | 5 | 2001 |
| Brazil | 2016 Copa do Nordeste | Santa Cruz | 1 | — |
| Brazil | 2016 Copa Verde | Paysandu | 1 | — |
| Brazil | 2016 Campeonato Paulista | Santos | 22 | 2015 |
| Brazil | 2016 Campeonato Carioca | Vasco da Gama | 24 | 2015 |
| Brazil | 2016 Campeonato Mineiro | América | 16 | 2001 |
| Brazil | 2016 Campeonato Gaúcho | Internacional | 45 | 2015 |
| Brazil | 2016 Campeonato Baiano | Vitória | 28 | 2013 |
| Brazil | 2016 Campeonato Pernambucano | Santa Cruz | 29 | 2015 |
| Brazil | 2016 Campeonato Paranaense | Atlético Paranaense | 23 | 2009 |
| Chile | 2016 Copa Chile | Colo-Colo | 11 | 1996 |
| Colombia | 2016 Copa Colombia | Atlético Nacional | 3 | 2013 |
| Colombia | 2016 Superliga Colombiana | Atlético Nacional | 2 | 2012 |
| Venezuela | 2016 Copa Venezuela | Zulia | 1 | — |

=== CONCACAF nations ===
| Nation | Tournament | Champion | Title | Last honor |
|---|---|---|---|---|
| Canada | 2016 Canadian Championship | Toronto FC | 5 | 2012 |
| Canada | 2016 The Challenge Trophy | | | |
| Canada | 2016 Inter-Provincial Cup Championship | | | |
| Canada | 2016 PLSQ Cup | | | |
| Canada | 2016 League1 Ontario Cup | | | |
| Canada | 2016 British Columbia Provincial Soccer Championship | | | |
| Aruba | 2015–16 Torneo Copa Betico Croes | | | |
| Barbados | 2015–16 Barbados FA Cup | | | |
| Bermuda | 2015-16 Bermuda FA Cup | | | |
| Cayman Islands | 2015–16 Cayman Islands FA Cup | | | |
| French Guiana | 2015–16 Coupe de Guyane | | | |
| Guadeloupe | 2016 Coupe de Guadeloupe | | | |
| Guyana | 2015–16 Kashif & Shanghai Knockout Tournament | | | |
| Guyana | 2016 Guyana Mayors Cup | | | |
| Martinique | 2016 Coupe de la Martinique | Golden Lion | 1 | — |
| Saint Kitts and Nevis | Saint Kitts and Nevis National Cup 2015-16 | | | |
| Suriname | 2016 Surinamese Cup | SV Robinhood | 6 | 2007 |
| Suriname | 2016 Suriname President's Cup (SuperCup) | | | |
| Jamaica | 2015–16 JFF Champions Cup | | | |
| Costa Rica | 2016 Torneo de Copa | | | |
| El Salvador | 2015–16 Copa EDESSA Independencia | | | |
| Honduras | 2016 Honduran Cup | | | |
| Honduras | 2016 Honduran Supercup | Olimpia | 2 | 1997 |
| Trinidad and Tobago | 2016 Trinidad and Tobago Cup | | | |
| Trinidad and Tobago | 2016 Trinidad and Tobago League Cup | Defence Force | 3 | 2009 |
| Mexico | Clausura 2016 Copa MX | Tiburones Rojos de Veracruz | 2 | 1947–48 |
| Mexico | Apertura 2016 Copa MX | Querétaro | 1 | — |
| Mexico | 2016 Supercopa MX | Guadalajara | 1 | — |
| Mexico | 2016 Campeón de Campeones | UANL | 1 | — |
| United States | 2016 Lamar Hunt U.S. Open Cup | FC Dallas | 2 | 1997 |

=== AFC nations ===
| Nation | Tournament | Champion | Title | Last honor |
|---|---|---|---|---|
| Australia | 2016 FFA Cup | Melbourne City | 1 | — |
| Bahrain | 2016 Bahraini King's Cup | Al-Muharraq | 32 | 2013 |
| Bahrain | 2016 Bahraini FA Cup | Al-Ahli Club | 2 | 2007 |
| Bahrain | 2016 Bahraini Super Cup | Al-Hidd | 2 | 2015 |
| Iraq | 2015–16 Iraq FA Cup | Al-Quwa Al-Jawiya | 4 | 1996–97 |
| Jordan | 2015–16 Jordan FA Cup | Al-Ahli | 1 | — |
| Jordan | 2016 Jordan Super Cup | Al-Ahli | 1 | — |
| Kuwait | 2015–16 Kuwait Emir Cup | Kuwait SC | 11 | 2013–14 |
| Kuwait | 2015–16 Kuwait Crown Prince Cup | Al-Salmiya | 2 | 2001 |
| Kuwait | 2015–16 Kuwait Federation Cup | Kazma | 1 | — |
| Kuwait | 2016 Kuwait Super Cup | Kuwait SC | 3 | 2015 |
| Lebanon | 2015–16 Lebanese FA Cup | Nejmeh | 5 | 1998 |
| Lebanon | 2015–16 Lebanese Elite Cup | Nejmeh | 9 | 2014 |
| Lebanon | 2016 Lebanese Super Cup | Nejmeh | 6 | 2014 |
| Oman | 2015–16 Sultan Qaboos Cup | Saham Club | 2 | 2009 |
| Oman | 2015–16 Oman Professional League Cup | Al-Nasr | 1 | — |
| Oman | 2016 Oman Super Cup | Saham Club | 2 | 2010 |
| Palestine | 2016 Palestine Cup | Ahli Al-Khaleel | 2 | 2015 |
| Qatar | 2016 Emir of Qatar Cup | Lekhwiya | 1 | — |
| Qatar | 2016 Qatar Cup | El Jaish | 2 | 2014 |
| Saudi Arabia | 2016 The Custodian of The Two Holy Mosques Cup | Al-Ahli | 13 | 2012 |
| Saudi Arabia | 2015–16 Saudi Crown Prince Cup | Al-Hilal | 13 | 2012–13 |
| Saudi Arabia | 2016 Saudi Super Cup | Al-Ahli | 1 | — |
| Syria | 2015–16 Syrian Cup | Al-Wahda | 6 | 2015 |
| United Arab Emirates | 2015–16 UAE President's Cup | Al Jazira | 3 | 2011–12 |
| United Arab Emirates | 2015–16 UAE League Cup | Al-Wahda | 1 | — |
| United Arab Emirates | 2015–16 UAE FA Cup | Ajman | 2 | 2010/2011 |
| United Arab Emirates | 2016 UAE Super Cup | Al-Ahli | 4 | 2014 |
| Yemen | 2015–16 Yemeni President Cup | | | |
| Yemen | 2016 Yemeni Super Cup | | | |
| Iran | 2015–16 Hazfi Cup | Zob Ahan | 4 | 2015 |
| Kyrgyzstan | 2016 Kyrgyzstan Cup | Dordoi Bishkek | 8 | 2014 |
| Kyrgyzstan | 2016 Kyrgyzstan Super Cup | Abdysh-Ata Kant | 1 | — |
| Tajikistan | 2016 Tajik Cup | Istiklol | 6 | 2015 |
| Turkmenistan | 2016 Turkmenistan Cup | Altyn Asyr | 3 | 2015 |
| Turkmenistan | 2016 Turkmenistan Super Cup | Altyn Asyr | 2 | 2015 |
| Uzbekistan | 2016 Uzbekistan Cup | Lokomotiv Tashkent | 2 | 2014 |
| Uzbekistan | 2016 Uzbekistan Super Cup | Nasaf | 1 | — |
| Bangladesh | 2016 Bangladesh Federation Cup | Dhaka Abahani | 9 | 2010 |
| India | 2015–16 Indian Federation Cup | Mohun Bagan | 14 | 2008 |
| India | 2016 Durand Cup | Army Green | 1 | — |
| India | 2016 IFA Shield | Tata Academy | 1 | — |
| Maldives | 2016 Maldives FA Cup | Club Valencia | 5 | 2004 |
| Maldives | 2016 President's Cup | Club Eagles | 1 | — |
| Maldives | 2016 Maldivian FA Charity Shield | Maziya | 2 | 2015 |
| Pakistan | 2016 PFF Cup | Khan Research Laboratories | 6 | 2015 |
| Sri Lanka | 2015–16 Sri Lanka FA Cup | | | |
| China | 2016 Chinese FA Cup | Guangzhou Evergrande Taobao | 2 | 2012 |
| China | 2016 Chinese FA Super Cup | Guangzhou Evergrande | 2 | 2012 |
| Guam | 2016 Guam FA Cup | Rovers | 2 | 2014 |
| Hong Kong | 2015–16 Hong Kong Senior Challenge Shield | Eastern Sports Club | 10 | 2014–15 |
| Hong Kong | 2015–16 Hong Kong FA Cup | Hong Kong Pegasus | 2 | 2009–10 |
| Hong Kong | 2015–16 Hong Kong League Cup | Kitchee | 4 | 2011–12 |
| Hong Kong | 2015–16 Hong Kong season play-off | Kitchee | 2 | 2012–13 |
| Japan | 2016 Emperor's Cup | Kashima Antlers | 8 | 2008 |
| Japan | 2016 J.League Cup | Urawa Red Diamonds | 2 | 2003 |
| Japan | 2016 Japanese Super Cup | Sanfrecce Hiroshima | 4 | 2014 |
| South Korea | 2016 Korean FA Cup | Suwon Samsung Bluewings | 4 | 2010 |
| North Korea | 2016 Mangyongdae Prize Sports Games | April 25 | | |
| Macau | 2016 Taça de Macau em Futebol | Windsor Arch Ka I | 4 | 2015 |
| Mongolia | 2016 Mongolia Cup | | | |
| Brunei | 2016 Brunei FA Cup | | | |
| Brunei | 2016 Brunei Super Cup | MS ABDB | 2 | 2014 |
| Cambodia | 2016 Hun Sen Cup | National Defense Ministry | 2 | 2010 |
| Malaysia | 2016 Malaysia Cup | Kedah | 5 | 2008 |
| Malaysia | 2016 Malaysia FA Cup | Johor Darul Ta'zim | 1 | — |
| Malaysia | 2016 Sultan Haji Ahmad Shah Cup | Johor Darul Ta'zim | 2 | 2015 |
| Myanmar | 2016 General Aung San Shield | Magwe | 1 | — |
| Philippines | 2016 UFL Cup | Global | 2 | 2010 |
| Singapore | 2016 Singapore Cup | Albirex Niigata Singapore | 2 | 2015 |
| Singapore | 2016 Singapore League Cup | Albirex Niigata Singapore | 3 | 2015 |
| Singapore | 2016 Singapore Charity Shield | Albirex Niigata Singapore | 1 | — |
| Thailand | 2016 Thai FA Cup | | | |
| Thailand | 2016 Thai League Cup | Buriram United; Muangthong United | 5; 1 | 2015 — |
| Thailand | 2016 Kor Royal Cup | Buriram United | 4 | 2015 |
| Vietnam | 2016 Vietnamese Cup | Than Quảng Ninh | 1 | — |
| Vietnam | 2016 Vietnamese Super Cup | Becamex Bình Dương | 5 | 2015 |

=== CAF nations ===
| Nation | Tournament | Champion | Title | Last honor |
|---|---|---|---|---|
| Algeria | 2015–16 Algerian Cup | MC Alger | 8 | 2013–14 |
| Algeria | 2016 Algerian Super Cup | USM Alger | 2 | 2013 |
| Egypt | 2015–16 Egypt Cup | Zamalek | 25 | 2014–15 |
| Egypt | 2016 Egyptian Super Cup | Not held | | |
| Morocco | 2015–16 Coupe du Trône | | | |
| Tunisia | 2015–16 Tunisian Cup | ES Tunis | 15 | 2011 |
| Benin | 2016 Benin Cup | | | |
| Burkina Faso | 2016 Coupe du Faso | | | |
| (The Gambia) Gambia | 2016 Gambian Cup | | | |
| Ghana | 2016 Ghanaian FA Cup | | | |
| Guinea | 2016 Guinée Coupe Nationale | | | |
| Guinea-Bissau | 2016 Taça Nacional da Guiné Bissau | | | |
| Ivory Coast | 2016 Coupe de Côte d'Ivoire de football | | | |
| Ivory Coast | 2016 Coupe Houphouët-Boigny | | | |
| Liberia | 2016 Liberian Cup | | | |
| Liberia | 2016 Liberian National County Meet | | | |
| Liberia | 2016 Liberian Super Cup | | | |
| Mali | 2016 Malian Cup | | | |
| Mali | 2016 Super Coupe National du Mali | | | |
| Mauritania | 2016 Coupe du Président de la République | | | |
| Mauritania | 2016 Mauritanian Super Cup | | | |
| Niger | 2016 Niger Cup | | | |
| Nigeria | 2016 Nigerian FA Cup | | | |
| Nigeria | 2016 Nigerian Super Cup | | | |
| Senegal | 2016 Senegal FA Cup | | | |
| Sierra Leone | 2016 Sierra Leonean FA Cup | | | |
| Cameroon | 2016 Cameroonian Cup | | | |
| Chad | 2016 Chad Cup | | | |
| Chad | 2016 Coupe de Ligue de N'Djaména | | | |
| (Republic of the Congo) Congo | 2016 Coupe du Congo de football | | | |
| (Democratic Republic of the Congo) DR Congo | 2016 Coupe du Congo | | | |
| Equatorial Guinea | 2016 Equatoguinean Cup | | | |
| Gabon | 2016 Coupe du Gabon Interclubs | | | |
| São Tomé and Príncipe | 2016 Taça Nacional de São Tomé e Príncipe | | | |
| Burundi | 2016 Burundian Cup | | | |
| Djibouti | 2016 Djibouti Cup | | | |
| Eritrea | 2016 Eritrean Cup | | | |
| Ethiopia | 2016 Ethiopian Cup | | | |
| Kenya | 2016 FKF President's Cup | | | |
| Kenya | 2016 KPL Top 8 Cup | | | |
| Kenya | 2016 Kenyan Super Cup | Bandari F.C. | 1 | — |
| Rwanda | 2016 Rwandan Cup | | | |
| Somalia | 2016 Somalia Cup | | | |
| South Sudan | 2016 South Sudan National Cup | | | |
| Sudan | 2016 Sudan Cup | | | |
| Uganda | 2015-16 Ugandan Cup | | | |
| Tanzania | 2016 Nyerere Cup | | | |
| Angola | 2016 Taça de Angola | | | |
| Angola | 2016 Supertaça de Angola | C.R.D. Libolo | 2 | 2015 |
| Botswana | 2016 FA Challenge Cup | | | |
| Botswana | 2016 Orange Kabelano Charity Cup | | | |
| Botswana | 2015–16 Mascom Top 8 Cup | Orapa United FC | 1 | — |
| Comoros | 2016 Comoros Cup | | | |
| Lesotho | 2016 Lesotho Independence Cup | | | |
| Lesotho | 2016 LNIG Top 8 | Lioli F.C. | 1 | — |
| Madagascar | 2016 Coupe de Madagascar | | | |
| Malawi | 2016 Malawi FAM Cup | | | |
| Malawi | 2016 Chifundo Charity Shield | Big Bullets F.C. | 1 | — |
| Mauritius | 2016 Mauritian Cup | | | |
| Mozambique | 2016 Taça de Moçambique | | | |
| Namibia | 2016 NFA Cup | | | |
| Seychelles | 2016 Seychelles FA Cup | | | |
| South Africa | 2015–16 Nedbank Cup | SuperSport United | 4 | 2011–12 |
| South Africa | 2016 Telkom Knockout | | | |
| South Africa | 2016 MTN 8 | | | |
| South Africa | 2016 Carling Black Label Cup | | | |
| (Eswatini) Swaziland | 2016 Swazi Cup | Mbabane Swallows | 4 | 2013 |
| (Eswatini) Swaziland | 2016 SMVAF Ingwenyama Cup | Mbabane Swallows | 1 | — |
| Zimbabwe | 2016 Cup of Zimbabwe | | | |
| Zimbabwe | 2016 Zimbabwean Independence Trophy | | | |
| Réunion | 2016 Coupe de la Réunion | | | |

=== OFC nations ===
| Nation | Tournament | Champion | Title | Last honor |
|---|---|---|---|---|
| New Zealand | 2016 ASB Chatham Cup | | | |
| New Zealand | 2016 ASB Charity Cup | | | |
| Samoa | 2016 Samoa Cup | | | |
| (French Polynesia) Tahiti | 2016 Tahiti Cup | A.S. Dragon | 5 | 2013 |
| Cook Islands | 2016 Cook Islands Cup | | | |
| Fiji | 2016 Fiji Football Association Cup Tournament | | | |
| Fiji | 2016 Battle of the Giants | | | |
| Fiji | 2016 Champion versus Champion (Fiji) | Nadi F.C. | 1 | — |
| New Caledonia | 2016 New Caledonia Cup | AS Magenta | 10 | 2014 |
| Tuvalu | 2016 NBT Cup | | | |
| Tuvalu | 2016 Tuvalu Independence Cup | | | |
| Tuvalu | 2016 Christmas Cup | | | |

== Second, third, fourth, and fifth leagues ==
=== CONCACAF ===
| Nation | League | Champion | Final score | Second place | Title | Last honour |
|---|---|---|---|---|---|---|
| Canada | 2016 Première Ligue de soccer du Québec | CS Mont-Royal Outremont | | A.S. Blainville | 3rd | 2015 |
| Canada | 2016 Canadian Soccer League | Serbian White Eagles | 2–1 (a.e.t.) | Hamilton City | 2nd | 2008 |

== Detailed results ==
=== 2016 Summer Olympics (FIFA) ===
- August 3 – 20: 2016 Summer Olympics in Rio de Janeiro (finals takes place at Maracanã Stadium)
  - Men: (gold) Brazil; (silver) Germany; (bronze) Nigeria
  - Women: (gold) Germany; (silver) Sweden; (bronze) Canada

=== 2016 FIFA tournaments ===
- September 30 – October 21: 2016 FIFA U-17 Women's World Cup in Jordan
  - North Korea defeated Japan, 5–4 in penalties and after a 0–0 in regular play, to win their second FIFA U-17 Women's World Cup title.
  - Spain took third place.
- November 13 – December 3: 2016 FIFA U-20 Women's World Cup in Papua New Guinea
  - North Korea defeated France, 3–1, to win their second FIFA U-20 Women's World Cup title.
  - Japan took third place.
- December 8 – 18: 2016 FIFA Club World Cup in Japan
  - (Spain) Real Madrid defeated (Japan) Kashima Antlers, 4–2 in extra time, to win their second FIFA Club World Cup title.
  - (Colombia) Atlético Nacional took third place.

=== UEFA ===
- June 30, 2015 – May 18, 2016: 2015–16 UEFA Europa League (final at (Switzerland) St. Jakob-Park, Basel)
  - (Spain) Sevilla FC defeated (England) Liverpool F.C., 3–1, to win their third consecutive and fifth overall UEFA Europa League title.
- June 30, 2015 – May 28, 2016: 2015–16 UEFA Champions League (final at (Italy) San Siro, Milan)
  - (Spain) Real Madrid defeated fellow Spanish team, Atlético Madrid, 5–3 in penalties and after a 1–1 score in regular play, to win their 11th UEFA Champions League title.
  - Real Madrid would represent UEFA at the 2016 FIFA Club World Cup.
- August 11, 2015 – May 26, 2016: 2015–16 UEFA Women's Champions League (final at (Italy) Mapei Stadium – Città del Tricolore, Reggio Emilia)
  - (France) Lyon defeated (Germany) Wolfsburg, 4–3 in penalties and after a 1–1 score in regular play, to win their third UEFA Women's Champions League title.
- September 15, 2015 – April 18, 2016: 2015–16 UEFA Youth League (final at (Switzerland) Centre sportif de Colovray Nyon, Nyon)
  - (England) Chelsea defeated (France) Paris Saint-Germain, 2–1, to win their second consecutive UEFA Youth League title.
- May 4 – 16: 2016 UEFA Women's Under-17 Championship in Belarus
  - Germany defeated Spain, 3–2 in penalties and after a 0–0 score in regular play, to win their fifth UEFA Women's Under-17 Championship. England took third place.
- May 5 – 21: 2016 UEFA European Under-17 Championship in Azerbaijan
  - Portugal defeated Spain, 5–4 in penalties and after a 1–1 score in regular play, to win their sixth UEFA European Under-17 Championship title.
- June 10 – July 10: UEFA Euro 2016 in France (final at Stade de France in Saint-Denis)
  - Portugal defeated France, 1–0 in extra time, to win their first UEFA Euro Championship title.
- July 11 – 24: 2016 UEFA European Under-19 Championship in Germany
  - France defeated Italy, 4–0, to win their eighth UEFA European Under-19 Championship title.
- July 19 – 31: 2016 UEFA Women's Under-19 Championship in Slovakia
  - France defeated Spain, 2–1, to win their fourth UEFA Women's Under-19 Championship title.
- August 9: 2016 UEFA Super Cup in (Norway) Lerkendal Stadion, Trondheim
  - (Spain) Real Madrid defeated fellow Spanish team, Sevilla FC, 3–2, to win their third UEFA Super Cup title.

=== CONMEBOL ===
- January 30 – February 14: 2016 U-20 Copa Libertadores in (Paraguay) Luque and Asunción
  - (Brazil) São Paulo defeated (Uruguay) Liverpool, 1–0, to win their first U-20 Copa Libertadores title. (Colombia) Cortuluá took third place.
- February 2 – July 27: 2016 Copa Libertadores
  - (Colombia) Atlético Nacional defeated (Ecuador) Independiente del Valle, 2–1 on aggregate, to win their second Copa Libertadores title.
  - Atlético Nacional would represent CONMEBOL at the 2016 FIFA Club World Cup
- March 1 – 20: 2016 South American Under-17 Women's Football Championship in Barquisimeto
  - Note: All the teams listed below qualified to compete in the 2016 FIFA U-17 Women's World Cup.
  - Champions: Venezuela (second consecutive South American Under-17 Women's Football Championship title)
  - Second: Brazil
  - Third: Paraguay
- June 3 – 26: Copa América Centenario in the United States
  - Chile defeated Argentina, 4–2, after overtime and penalties, to win their second consecutive Copa América. Colombia took third place.
- August 9 – December 7: 2016 Copa Sudamericana
  - CONMEBOL has decided that team (Brazil) Chapecoense would posthumously be the winners of the 2016 Copa Sudamericana title, following LaMia Flight 2933 disaster.
- August 10: 2016 Suruga Bank Championship in (Japan) Kashima, Ibaraki
  - (Colombia) Santa Fe defeated (Japan) Kashima Antlers, 1–0, to win their first Suruga Bank Championship title.
- August 18 & 25: 2016 Recopa Sudamericana
  - (Argentina) River Plate defeated (Colombia) Santa Fe, 2–1, to win their second consecutive Recopa Sudamericana title.
- December 6 – 20: 2016 Copa Libertadores Femenina in Uruguay
  - (Paraguay) Sportivo Limpeño defeated (Venezuela) Estudiantes de Guárico, 2–1, to win their first Copa Libertadores Femenina title.
  - (Brazil) Foz Cataratas took third place.

=== CAF ===
- November 27, 2015 – March 27, 2016: 2015–16 CAF U-17 Women's World Cup Qualifying Tournament
  - Cameroon, Ghana, and Nigeria all qualified to compete at the 2016 FIFA U-17 Women's World Cup.
- January 16 – February 7: 2016 African Nations Championship in Rwanda
  - The DR Congo defeated Mali, 3–0, to win their second African Nations Championship title. The Ivory Coast took the bronze medal.
- February 12 – October 23: 2016 CAF Champions League
  - (South Africa) Mamelodi Sundowns defeated (Egypt) Zamalek, 3–1 on aggregate, to win their first CAF Champions League title.
  - The Mamelodi Sundowns represented the CAF at the 2016 FIFA Club World Cup.
- February 12 – November 6: 2016 CAF Confederation Cup
  - (Democratic Republic of the Congo) TP Mazembe defeated (Algeria) MO Béjaïa, 5–2 on aggregate, to win their first CAF Confederation Cup title.
- February 20: 2016 CAF Super Cup
  - (Democratic Republic of the Congo) TP Mazembe defeated (Tunisia) Étoile Sportive du Sahel, 2–1, to win their third CAF Super Cup title.
- November 19 – December 3: 2016 Africa Women Cup of Nations in Cameroon
  - Nigeria defeated Cameroon, 1–0, to win their second consecutive and tenth overall Africa Women Cup of Nations title.
  - Ghana took third place.
- November 26 – December 3: 2016 UEMOA Tournament in (Togo) Lomé
  - Senegal defeated Mali, 1–0, to win their third UEMOA tournament title.
- December 7 – 16: 2016 COSAFA U-20 Cup in Rustenburg
  - Zambia defeated South Africa, 2–1, to win their tenth COSAFA U-20 Cup title. DR Congo took third place.

=== AFC ===
- August 11, 2015 – November 5, 2016: 2016 AFC Cup
  - (Iraq) Al-Quwa Al-Jawiya defeated (India) Bengaluru FC, 1–0, to win their first AFC Cup title.
- January 12 – 30: 2016 AFC U-23 Championship in Qatar
  - Japan defeated South Korea, 3–2, to win their first AFC U-23 Championship title. Iraq took third place.
- February 29 – March 9: 2015–16 AFC Women's Olympic Qualifying Tournament (final) in (Japan) Osaka
  - Australia win the tournament. Australia and China qualified from 2016 Summer Olympics.
- January 27 – November 26: 2016 AFC Champions League
  - (South Korea) Jeonbuk Hyundai Motors defeated (United Arab Emirates) Al Ain FC, 3–2 in aggregate, to win their second AFC Champions League title.
  - Jeonbuk Hyundai Motors would represent the AFC at the 2016 FIFA Club World Cup.
- July 10 – 23: 2016 AFF U-16 Youth Championship in (Cambodia) Phnom Penh
  - Australia defeated Vietnam, 5–3 in penalties and after a 3–3 score in regular play, to win their second AFF U-16 Youth Championship title.
  - Thailand took third place.
- July 26 – August 4: 2016 AFF Women's Championship in Mandalay
  - Thailand defeated Vietnam, 6–5 in penalties and after a 1–1 score in regular play, to win their fourth AFF Women's Championship.
  - Myanmar took third place.
- September 11 – 24: 2016 AFF U-19 Youth Championship in Hanoi
  - Australia defeated Thailand, 5–1, to win their fourth AFF U-19 Youth Championship title.
  - Vietnam took third place.
- September 15 – October 2: 2016 AFC U-16 Championship in India
  - Iraq defeated Iran, 4–3 in penalties and after a 0–0 score in regular play, to win their first AFC U-16 Championship title.
- October 13 – 30: 2016 AFC U-19 Championship in Bahrain
  - Japan defeated Saudi Arabia, 5–3 in penalties and after a 0–0 score in regular play, to win their first AFC U-19 Championship title.
- November 2 – 15: 2016 AFC Solidarity Cup in Malaysia
  - Nepal defeated Macau, 1–0, to win their first 2016 AFC Solidarity Cup title. Laos took third place.
- November 19 – December 17: 2016 AFF Championship in Myanmar and the Philippines
  - Thailand defeated Indonesia, 3–2 on aggregate, to win their second consecutive and fifth overall AFF Championship title.

=== CONCACAF ===
- February 10 – 21: 2016 CONCACAF Women's Olympic Qualifying Championship in Frisco and Houston
  - The United States defeated Canada, 2–0, to win their fourth consecutive CONCACAF Women's Olympic Qualifying Tournament title.
  - Note: The United States and Canada have qualified to compete at Rio 2016.
- August 4, 2015 – April 27, 2016: 2015–16 CONCACAF Champions League
  - (Mexico) Club América defeated fellow Mexican team, Tigres UANL, 4–1 on aggregate, to win their second consecutive CONCACAF Champions League title.
  - Club América would represent CONCACAF at the 2016 FIFA Club World Cup.
- March 3 – 13: 2016 CONCACAF Women's U-17 Championship in Grenada
  - The United States defeated Mexico, 2–1, to win their third CONCACAF Women's U-17 Championship title. Canada took third place.

=== OFC ===
- January 13 – 23: 2016 OFC U-17 Women's Championship in (Cook Islands) Matavera
  - New Zealand defeated Papua New Guinea, 8–0, to win their third consecutive OFC U-17 Women's Championship title. Fiji took third place.
- January 26 – April 23: 2016 OFC Champions League
  - Auckland City FC defeated fellow New Zealand team, Team Wellington, 3–0, to win their seventh OFC Champions League title.
  - Auckland City would represent the OFC at the 2016 FIFA Club World Cup.
- May 28 – June 11: 2016 OFC Nations Cup in Papua New Guinea
  - New Zealand defeated Papua New Guinea, 4–2 in penalties and after a 0–0 score in regular play, to win their fifth OFC Nations Cup title.
- September 2 – 17: 2016 OFC U-20 Championship in Port Vila
  - New Zealand defeated Vanuatu, 5–0, to win their sixth OFC U-20 Championship title.

== Deaths ==
=== January ===
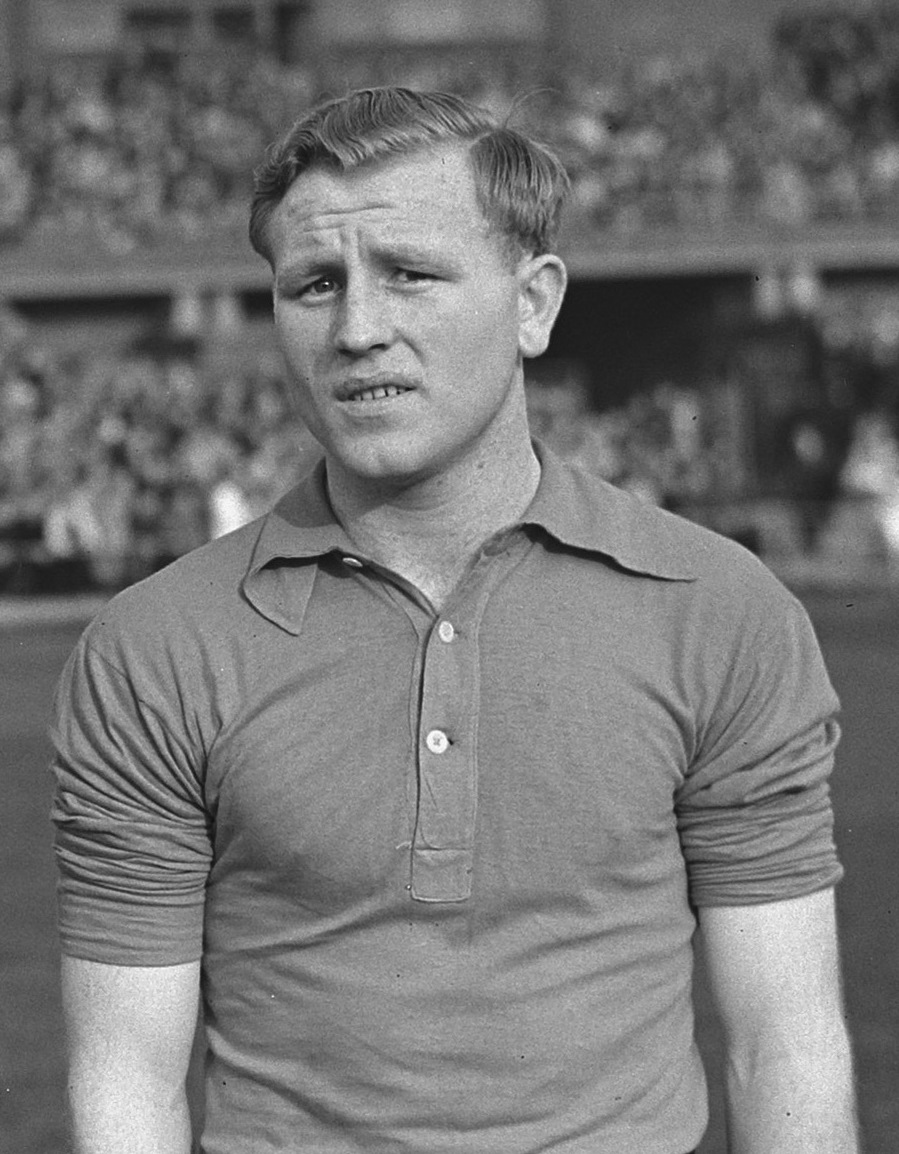
Wim Bleijenberg

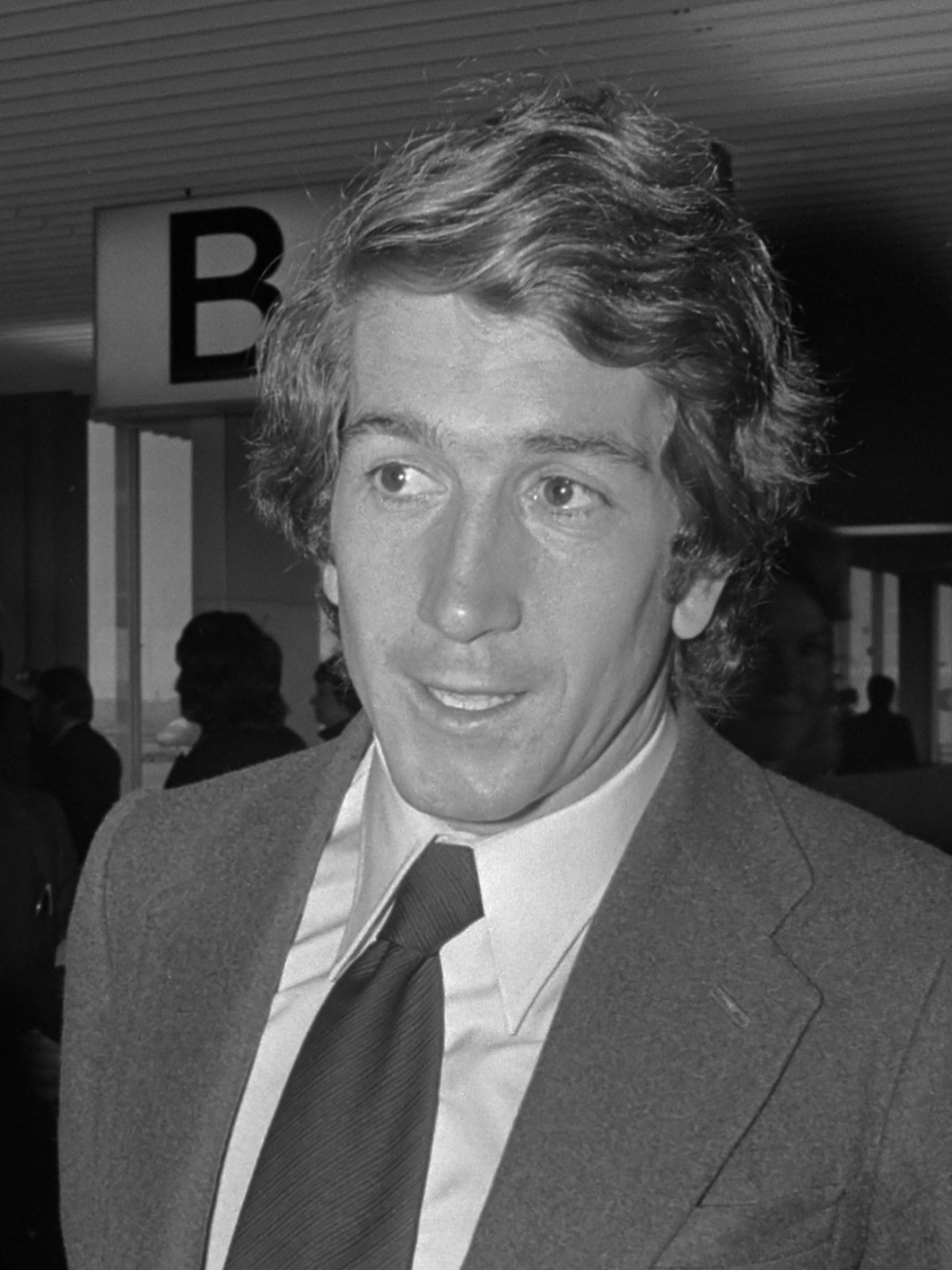
Manuel Velázquez

- 3 January: Klaas Bakker, Dutch footballer (born 1926)
- 4 January:
  - Amby Fogarty, Irish international footballer (born 1933)
  - Fernando Barrachina, Spanish international footballer (born 1947)
  - John Roberts, Welsh international footballer (born 1946)
- 5 January: Percy Freeman, English footballer (born 1945)
- 7 January: Sergey Shustikov, Russian footballer (born 1970)
- 9 January:
  - Hamada Emam, Egyptian footballer (born 1943)
  - Johnny Jordan, English footballer (born 1921)
  - José María Rivas, Salvadorian international footballer (born 1958)
- 10 January:
  - Wim Bleijenberg, Dutch international footballer (born 1930)
  - Teofil Codreanu, Romanian international footballer (born 1941)
  - Kalevi Lehtovirta, Finnish footballer (born 1928)
- 11 January: Reginaldo Araújo, Brazilian footballer (born 1977)
- 12 January: Milorad Rajović, Serbian footballer (born 1955)
- 15 January: Manuel Velázquez, Spanish international footballer (born 1943)
- 17 January:
  - Reza Ahadi, Iranian footballer (born 1962)
  - John Taihuttu, Dutch footballer (born 1954)
- 22 January: Homayoun Behzadi, Iranian footballer (born 1942)
- 23 January: Koichi Sekimoto, Japanese footballer (born 1978)
- 24 January: Eric Webster, English footballer (born 1931)
- 26 January: Ray Pointer, English footballer (born 1936)
- 27 January:
  - Peter Baker, English footballer (born 1931)
  - Tommy O'Hara, Scottish footballer (born 1952)
- 28 January:
  - Dave Thomson, Scottish footballer (born 1938)
  - Ladislav Totkovič, Slovak footballer (born 1962)
- 30 January: Peter Quinn, Irish Gaelic footballer (born 1925)

=== February ===
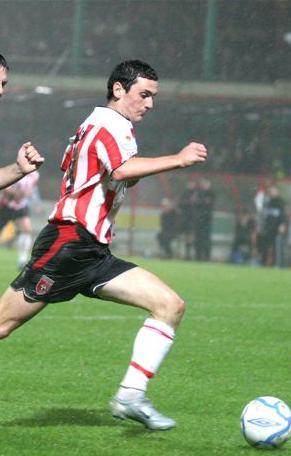
Mark Farren

- 1 February:
  - Ali Beratlıgil, 84, Turkish football player and coach.
  - Miguel Gutiérrez, 84, Mexican footballer (Club Atlas).
- 3 February:
  - Mark Farren, Irish footballer (born 1982)
  - Suat Mamat, Turkish international footballer (born 1930)
- 4 February:
  - Harry Glasgow, Scottish footballer (born 1939)
  - David Sloan, Northern Irish international footballer (born 1941)
- 9 February: Graham Moore, Welsh footballer (born 1941)
- 10 February:
  - Leo Ehlen, Dutch footballer (born 1953)
  - Anatoli Ilyin, Soviet Russian footballer (born 1931)
  - Eliseo Prado, Argentine international footballer (born 1929)
  - Günter Schröter, East German international footballer (born 1927)
- 11 February:
  - Juan Mujica, Uruguayan international footballer and manager (born 1943)
  - Ferenc Rudas, Hungarian footballer (born 1921)
- 12 February: Hugo Tassara, Chilean football manager (born 1924)
- 13 February:
  - Trifon Ivanov, Bulgarian international footballer (born 1965)
  - Giorgio Rossano, Italian footballer (born 1939)
  - Slobodan Santrač, Yugoslavian international footballer and manager (born 1946)
- 15 February:
  - Paul Bannon, Irish footballer (born 1956)
  - Hans Posthumus, Dutch footballer (born 1947)
- 16 February: Ronnie Blackman, English footballer (born 1925)
- 18 February:
  - Johnny Miller, English footballer (born 1950)
  - Don Rossiter, English footballer (born 1935)
  - Giorgio Tinazzi, Italian footballer (born 1934)
- 19 February:
  - Din Joe Crowley, Irish Gaelic footballer (born 1945)
  - Freddie Goodwin, English footballer (born 1933)
- 20 February:
  - Muhamed Mujić, Bosnian footballer (born 1933)
  - Nando Yosu, Spanish footballer (born 1939)
- 24 February: Rafael Iriondo, Spanish international footballer and manager (born 1918)
- 28 February: Raúl Sánchez, Chilean international footballer (born 1933)
- 29 February:
  - Hannes Löhr, German international footballer and coach (born 1942)
  - José Parra Martínez, Spanish footballer (born 1925)

=== March ===
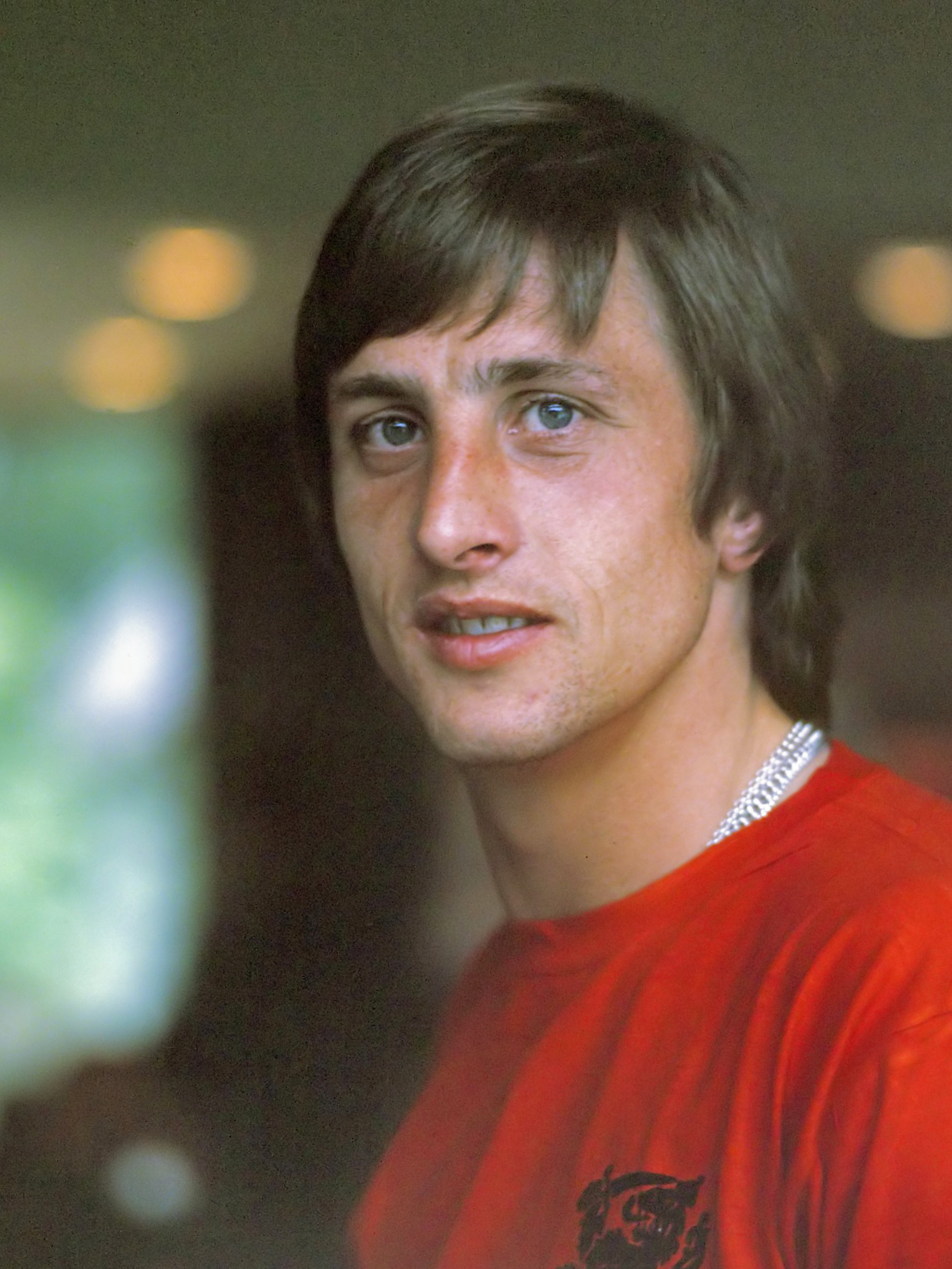
Johan Cruyff

- 1 March: Ítalo Estupiñán, Ecuadorian international footballer (born 1952)
- 2 March: Allan Michaelsen, Danish international footballer (born 1947)
- 4 March: Yuri Kuznetsov, Soviet international footballer (born 1931)
- 5 March: Even Hansen, Norwegian footballer (born 1923)
- 6 March: Wally Bragg, English footballer (born 1929)
- 7 March: Béla Kuharszki, Hungarian footballer (born 1940)
- 10 March: Roberto Perfumo, Argentine international footballer (born 1942)
- 11 March: Billy Ritchie, Serbian footballer (born 1936)
- 13 March: József Verebes, Hungarian footballer (born 1941)
- 14 March: Davy Walsh, Irish footballer (born 1923)
- 15 March:
  - John Ene Okon, Nigerian footballer (born 1969)
  - Vladimir Yurin, Russian footballer (born 1947)
- 16 March:
  - Brian Smyth, Irish Gaelic footballer (born 1924)
  - Alan Spavin, English footballer (born 1942)
- 19 March:
  - José Artetxe, Spanish international footballer (born 1930)
  - Jack Mansell, English footballer (born 1927)
- 21 March: Jean Cornelis, Belgian international footballer (born 1941)
- 24 March:
  - Johan Cruyff, Dutch international footballer and manager (born 1947)
  - Proloy Saha, Indian footballer
  - Brendan Sloan, Northern Irish Gaelic footballer (born 1948)
- 25 March: Raúl Cárdenas, Mexican international footballer (born 1928)
- 26 March: Paddy O'Brien, Irish Gaelic footballer
- 27 March:
  - Abel Dhaira, Ugandan international footballer (born 1987)
  - Silvio Fogel, Argentine footballer (born 1949)
- 29 March: Maxime Camara, Guinean football midfielder (born 1943)
- 30 March: John King, English footballer (born 1938)
- 31 March:
  - Aníbal Alzate, Colombian footballer (born 1933)
  - Ian Britton, Scottish footballer (born 1954)
  - Amaury Epaminondas, Brazilian footballer (born 1935)

=== April ===
- 2 April:
  - Sergio Ferrari, Italian footballer (born 1943)
  - Nabil Nosair, Egyptian footballer (born 1938)
  - László Sárosi, Hungarian international footballer (born 1932)
- 3 April:
  - Cesare Maldini, Italian international footballer (born 1932)
  - John Waite, English footballer (born 1942)
- 4 April:
  - Georgi Hristakiev, Bulgarian international footballer (born 1944)
  - Ken Waterhouse, English footballer (born 1930)
- 5 April: Koço Kasapoğlu, Turkish footballer (born 1936)
- 6 April:
  - Bernd Hoss, German footballer (born 1939)
  - Garry Jones, English footballer (born 1950)
- 8 April: Fred Middleton, English footballer (born 1930)
- 12 April:
  - Aquilino Bonfanti, Italian footballer (born 1943)
  - Pedro de Felipe, Spanish footballer (born 1944)
- 16 April: Louis Pilot, Luxembourgian footballer (born 1940)
- 18 April: Fritz Herkenrath, German international goalkeeper (born 1928)
- 19 April:
  - Mehrdad Oladi, Iranian footballer (born 1985)
  - Igor Volchok, Russian footballer (born 1931)
- 22 April: John Lumsden, Scottish footballer (born 1950)
- 25 April: Dumitru Antonescu, Romanian international footballer (born 1945)
- 26 April: Vladimir Yulygin, Russian footballer (born 1936)
- 28 April: Óscar Marcelino Álvarez, Argentine footballer (born 1948)

=== May ===
- 6 May:
  - Nico de Bree, Dutch footballer (born 1944)
  - Larry Pinto de Faria, Brazilian footballer (born 1932)
  - Valeriy Zuyev, Ukrainian footballer (born 1952)
- 7 May:
  - José Roberto Marques, Brazilian footballer (born 1945)
  - George Ross, Scottish footballer (born 1943)
- 8 May: Wolfgang Patzke, German footballer (born 1959)
- 7 May: Chris Mitchell, Scottish footballer (born 1988)
- 13 May: Engelbert Kraus, German international footballer (born 1934)
- 18 May: Zygmunt Kukla, Polish international footballer (born 1948)
- 25 May: Ian Gibson, Scottish footballer (born 1943)
- 26 May:
  - Esad Čolaković, Macedonian footballer (born 1970)
  - Ted Dumitru, Romanian football manager (born 1939)
- 27 May:
  - Gerhard Harpers, German international footballer (born 1928)
  - František Jakubec, Czech international footballer (born 1956)
- 30 May: Jan Aas, Norwegian footballer (born 1944)

=== June ===
- 2 June:
  - Yevhen Lemeshko, Ukrainian footballer (born 1930)
  - Abderrahmane Meziani, Algerian footballer (born 1942)
- 4 June:
  - István Halász, Hungarian international footballer (born 1951)
  - Nicky Jennings, English footballer (born 1946)
- 6 June: Harry Gregory, English footballer (born 1943)
- 7 June:
  - Børge Bach, Danish international footballer (born 1945)
  - Johnny Brooks, English footballer (born 1931)
  - Stephen Keshi, Nigerian international footballer (born 1962)
  - Didargylyç Urazow, Turkmen footballer (born 1977)
- 10 June:
  - Shuaibu Amodu, Nigerian footballer (born 1958)
  - Alex Govan, Scottish footballer (born 1929)
  - Ambrose Hickey, Irish Gaelic footballer (born 1945)
  - Giuseppe Virgili, Italian international footballer (born 1935)
- 12 June: Alfonso Portugal, Mexican international footballer (born 1934)
- 13 June:
  - Uriah Asante, Ghanaian footballer (born 1992)
  - Tony Byrne, Irish footballer (born 1946)
- 16 June: Luděk Macela, Czech international footballer (born 1950)
- 20 June:
  - Eamonn Dolan, Irish footballer (born 1967)
  - Willie Logie, Scottish footballer (born 1932)
- 21 June: Bryan Edwards, English footballer (born 1930)
- 22 June: Tokia Russell, Bermudian footballer (born 1977)
- 27 June: Luís Carlos Melo Lopes, Brazilian footballer (born 1954)

=== July ===
- 1 July: Jerzy Patoła, Polish footballer (born 1946)
- 3 July:
  - Jimmy Frizzell, Scottish footballer (born 1937)
  - John Middleton, English footballer (born 1956)
- 4 July: Ben Koufie, Ghanaian footballer (born 1932)
- 5 July: Mick Finucane, Irish Gaelic footballer (born 1922)
- 6 July: Turgay Şeren, Turkish international footballer (born 1932)
- 7 July: John O'Rourke, English footballer (born 1945)
- 8 July: Jackie McInally, Scottish footballer (born 1936)
- 9 July: Erny Brenner, Luxembourgian footballer (born 1931)
- 10 July:
  - Amal Dutta, Indian footballer (born 1930)
  - Anatoli Isayev, Soviet footballer (born 1932)
  - David Stride, English footballer (born 1958)
- 11 July: Kurt Svensson, Swedish footballer (born 1927)
- 13 July: George Allen, English footballer (born 1932)
- 16 July: Oleg Syrokvashko, Belarusian footballer (born 1961)
- 18 July:
  - John Hope, English footballer (born 1949)
  - Heinz Lucas, German footballer (born 1920)
- 19 July: Tom McCready, Scottish footballer (born 1943)
- 23 July:
  - Boy-Boy Mosia, South African footballer (born 1985)
  - Peter Wenger, Swiss footballer (born 1944)
- 24 July:
  - Marto Gracias, Indian footballer
  - Ian King, Scottish footballer (born 1937)
- 25 July:
  - Artur Correia, Portuguese footballer (born 1950)
  - Bülent Eken, Turkish footballer (born 1923)
- 26 July: Dave Syrett, English footballer (born 1956)
- 27 July: Máximo Mosquera, Peruvian footballer (born 1928)
- 28 July: Vladica Kovačević, Serbian footballer (born 1940)

=== August ===
- 2 August: Neil Wilkinson, English footballer (born 1955)
- 4 August: Charles Toubé, Cameroonian footballer (born 1958)
- 5 August: Joe Davis, Scottish footballer (born 1941)
- 6 August: Mel Slack, English footballer (born 1944)
- 7 August: Roy Summersby, English footballer (born 1935)
- 9 August: Karl Bögelein, German international footballer and coach (born 1927)
- 13 August: Liam Tuohy, English footballer (born 1933)
- 15 August: Dalian Atkinson, English footballer (born 1968)
- 20 August: Rab Stewart, English footballer (born 1962)
- 26 August:
  - Anton Pronk, Dutch international footballer (born 1941)
  - Jiří Tichý, Czech footballer (born 1933)
- 27 August:
  - Alcindo, Brazilian footballer (born 1945)
  - Alan Smith, English footballer (born 1939)
- 29 August:
  - Reg Matthewson, English footballer (born 1939)
  - Anne O'Brien, Irish footballer (born 1956)
- 30 August:
  - Josip Bukal, Bosnian footballer (born 1945)
  - Dave Durie, English footballer (born 1931)

=== September ===
- 3 September: Jan Nilsen, Norwegian footballer (born 1937)
- 4 September: Zvonko Ivezić, Serbian footballer (born 1949)
- 5 September:
  - Jaroslav Jareš, Czech footballer (born 1930)
  - George McLeod, Scottish footballer (born 1932)
- 6 September: Dave Pacey, English footballer (born 1936)
- 8 September: Bert Llewellyn, English footballer (born 1939)
- 9 September:
  - Sylvia Gore, English footballer (born 1944)
  - James Siang'a, Kenyan footballer
- 11 September: Ben Idrissa Dermé, Burkinabe footballer (born 1982)
- 13 September:
  - Denis Atkins, English footballer (born 1938)
  - Ottavio Bugatti, Italian footballer (born 1928)
  - Matt Gray, Scottish footballer (born 1936)
- 15 September: Greg Maher, Irish Gaelic footballer (born 1967)
- 17 September: Sigge Parling, Swedish international footballer (born 1930)
- 20 September: Alan Cousin, Scottish footballer (born 1938)
- 21 September: Mahmadu Alphajor Bah, Sierra Leonean footballer (born 1977)
- 23 September:
  - Marcel Artelesa, French international footballer (born 1938)
  - Yngve Brodd, Swedish footballer (born 1930)
  - David Coleman, English footballer (born 1942)
- 24 September: Mel Charles, Welsh international footballer (born 1935)
- 26 September: Jackie Sewell, English footballer (born 1927)
- 27 September: Serigne Abdou Thiam, Qatari footballer (born 1995)
- 28 September:
  - Seamus Dunne, Irish footballer (born 1930)
  - Werner Friese, German footballer (born 1946)
  - Graham Hawkins, English footballer (born 1946)
- 29 September: Herbert Martin, German footballer (born 1925)
- 30 September: Paul Frantz, French footballer (born 1927)

=== October ===
- 1 October:
  - David Herd, Scottish international footballer (born 1934)
  - Erol Keskin, Turkish international footballer (born 1927)
  - Vittorio Scantamburlo, Italian football manager (born 1930)
- 3 October: Mário Wilson, Portuguese football central defender (born 1929)
- 4 October: Fred Osam-Duodu, Ghanaian football manager (born 1938)
- 6 October: Peter Denton, English footballer (born 1946)
- 7 October: Gonzalo Peralta, Argentine footballer (born 1980)
- 8 October: Guillaume Bieganski, French international footballer (born 1932)
- 10 October:
  - Gerry Gow, Scottish footballer (born 1952)
  - Eddie O'Hara, Scottish footballer (born 1935)
- 12 October: Shahlyla Baloch, Pakistani footballer (born 1996)
- 13 October: Primo Sentimenti, Italian footballer (born 1926)
- 14 October: Aleksandr Syomin, Soviet footballer (born 1943)
- 15 October: Per Rune Wølner, Norwegian footballer (born 1949)
- 16 October: George Peebles, Scottish footballer (born 1936)
- 17 October: Rémy Vogel, French international footballer (born 1960)
- 18 October: Gary Sprake, Welsh international footballer (born 1945)
- 19 October:
  - Safet Berisha, Albanian international footballer (born 1949)
  - Luis María Echeberría, Spanish footballer (born 1940)
  - Sammy Smyth, Northern Irish footballer (born 1925)
- 20 October: Uwe Dreher, German footballer (born 1960)
- 21 October: Constantin Frățilă, Romanian international footballer (born 1942)
- 24 October: Reinhard Häfner, German international footballer (born 1952)
- 25 October:
  - Bjørn Lidin Hansen, Norwegian footballer (born 1989)
  - Carlos Alberto Torres, Brazilian international footballer (born 1944)
- 26 October: Ali Hussein Shihab, Iraqi international footballer (born 1961)
- 27 October:
  - Brian Hill, English footballer (born 1941)
  - Fatim Jawara, Gambian footballer (born 1997)
- 31 October: Ray Mabbutt, English footballer (born 1936)

=== November ===
- 1 November: Sverre Andersen, Norwegian international footballer (born 1936)
- 2 November: Martin Lippens, Belgian international footballer (born 1934)
- 4 November: Mansour Pourheidari, Iranian international footballer, coach and manager (born 1946)
- 6 November: Mick Granger, English footballer (born 1931)
- 7 November:
  - Thomas Gardner, English footballer (born 1923)
  - Eric Murray, English footballer (born 1941)
- 8 November: Kazimír Gajdoš, Slovak international footballer (born 1934)
- 9 November: Emmanuel Kwasi Afranie, Ghanaian footballer (born 1943)
- 11 November:
  - Uwe Bracht, German footballer (born 1953)
  - Željko Čajkovski, Croatian international footballer and coach (born 1925)
  - Alfred Schmidt, German international footballer and manager (born 1935)
- 12 November: Adolf Kunstwadl, German footballer (born 1940)
- 13 November: Laurent Pokou, Ivorian international footballer (born 1947)
- 15 November: Bobby Campbell, Northern Irish footballer (born 1956)
- 16 November:
  - Len Allchurch, Welsh international footballer (born 1933)
  - Daniel Prodan, Romanian international footballer (born 1972)
- 18 November: Armando Tobar, Chilean international footballer (born 1938)
- 19 November: Christian Salaba, Austrian footballer (born 1971)
- 20 November: Gabriel Badilla, Costa Rican international footballer (born 1984)
- 21 November: René Vignal, French footballer (born 1926)
- 23 November: Joe Lennon, Northern Irish Gaelic football manager (born 1934)
- 24 November: Paul Futcher, English footballer (born 1956)
- 25 November: Jim Gillespie, Scottish footballer (born 1947)
- 26 November: David Provan, Scottish footballer (born 1941)
- 27 November: Lim Chiew Peng, Singaporean footballer
- 28 November: Victims of the Chapecoense disaster:
  - Victorino Chermont, Brazilian sportscaster (born 1973)
  - Paulo Julio Clement, Brazilian sportscaster (born 1964)
  - Caio Júnior, Brazilian player and manager (born 1965)
  - Delfim Peixoto, Brazilian football administrator (born 1941)
  - Mário Sérgio, Brazilian international footballer and manager (born 1950)
- 29 November: Norman Oakley, English footballer (born 1939)

=== December ===
- 2 December: Dejo Fayemi, Nigerian international footballer (born 1933)
- 3 December: Willie Casey, Irish Gaelic footballer (born 1952)
- 4 December: Nadine Juillard, French international footballer (born 1954)
- 6 December: Dave MacLaren, Scottish footballer (born 1934)
- 7 December:
  - Brian Bulless, English footballer (born 1933)
  - Ian Cartwright, English footballer (born 1964)
  - Sergei Razaryonov, Russian footballer (born 1955)
- 9 December: Sergei Lemeshko, Russian footballer (born 1972)
- 10 December:
  - Peter Brabrook, English international footballer (born 1937)
  - Tımmy McCulloch, Scottish footballer (born 1934)
  - Luciano Nobili, Italian footballer (born 1933)
- 11 December: Charlie McNeil, Scottish footballer (born 1963)
- 14 December: Fosco Becattini, Italian footballer (born 1925)
- 15 December: Albert Bennett, English footballer (born 1944)
- 18 December: Eddie Bailham, Irish footballer (born 1941)
- 19 December:
  - Ger Blok, Dutch football manager (born 1939)
  - Fidel Uriarte, Spanish international footballer (born 1945)
- 21 December: Şehmus Özer, Turkish footballer (born 1980)
- 23 December: Poul Pedersen, Danish footballer (born 1932)
- 26 December: Martin Reagan, English footballer (born 1924)
- 28 December: Edgar Robles, Paraguayan footballer (born 1977)
- 29 December:
  - Matt Carragher, English footballer (born 1976)
  - Uzama Douglas, Nigerian footballer (born 1988)
  - Norman Rimmington, English footballer (born 1923)
  - Lucien Schaeffer, French footballer (born 1928)
- 30 December: Ad-Diba, Egyptian footballer (born 1927)
