= Juillard =

Juillard may refer to:

== People ==
- André Juillard (1948-2024), French comic artist
- Charles Juillard (born 1962), Swiss politician
- Étienne Juillard (1914-2006), French geographer and scientist
- Marie-Ernestine Juillard (1885-1963), French heroine of World War I
- Nadine Juillard (1954-2016), French professional footballer

== Others ==
- Juilliard School, private performing arts conservatory in New York City
