= Boy Boy =

Boy Boy may refer to:

- Aleksa Vulović (born 1992), a Serbian-Australian YouTube personality and co-star of Boy Boy
- Boy-Boy Mosia (1985–2016), South African soccer player
- Horace Martin (born 1985), Jamaican-Dutch kickboxer, also known as Boy Boy Martin
