= 1961–62 Calcio Padova season =

Calcio Padova
1961–62 season
- Chairman: Bruno Pollazzi
- Manager: Giacomo Mari; Pietro Serantoni
- Stadium: Stadio Silvio Appiani
- Serie A: 16th
- Coppa Italia: Second Round
- Top goalscorer: Emanuele Del Vecchio (8); Rudolf Kölbl (8)

During the 1961–62 Italian football season, Calcio Padova competed in the Serie A. Padova finished 16th in the league standings and were relegated.

== Squad ==
=== Goalkeepers ===
- (Italy) Bruno Bonollo
- (Italy) Silvano Canton
- (Italy) Antonio Pin

=== Defenders ===
- (Italy) Giovanni Azzini
- (Italy) Ivano Blason
- (Italy) Cristiano Cervato
- (Italy) Giampaolo Lampredi
- (Italy) Luciano Piquè
- (Italy) Aurelio Scagnellato

=== Midfielders ===
- (Italy) Enrico Arienti
- (Italy) Giancarlo Bacci
- (Italy) Alberto Novelli
- (Italy) Giorgio Barbolini
- (Italy) Rino Bon
- (Italy) Giovanni Caleffi
- (Italy) Aldo Secco

=== Attackers ===
- (Italy) Celestino Celio
- (Italy) Giuseppe Cosma
- (Italy) Dante Crippa
- (Brazil) Emanuele Del Vecchio
- (Socialist Federal Republic of Yugoslavia) Tomislav Kaloperović
- (Germany) Rudolf Kölbl
- (Italy) Mario Tortul
- (Italy) Alberto Valsecchi

== Competitions ==
=== Serie A ===
==== League table ====
Pos	Team	Pld	W	D	L	GF	GA	GD	Pts	Qualification or relegation
14	Vicenza	34	8	11	15	29	43	−14	27	
14	SPAL	34	9	9	16	30	50	−20	27	
16	Padova (R)	34	7	9	18	29	49	−20	23	Relegated to Serie B
16	Lecco (R)	34	6	11	17	30	53	−23	23	Relegated to Serie B
18	Udinese (R)	34	6	5	23	37	63	−26	17	Relegated to Serie B

Source: Panini
(R) Relegated
