= Vittorio Scantamburlo =

Italian football scout (1930–2016)

Personal information
- Date of birth: 1 June 1930
- Place of birth: Conselve, Italy
- Date of death: 1 October 2016 (aged 86)
- Place of death: Padova, Italy

Senior career*
Years	Team	Apps	(Gls)
19??–1951	Luparense	?	(?)
1951–1953	Padova	0	(0)

Managerial career
- 1970–2013: Padova (youth coach and scout)
- * Club domestic league appearances and goals

Vittorio Scantamburlo (1 June 1930 – 1 October 2016) was an Italian football manager, player and scout, known for discovering Alessandro del Piero.

== Career ==
Player of Luparense between Serie C and Promozione, in 1951 goes along with Aurelio Scagnellato at Calcio Padova in Serie A, where he remained as a player until 1953.

In 1970 it was called by Aurelio Scagnellato to coach the youth of Calcio Padova. Over the years, he will win two national titles with youth. Moreover, at the same time, it is also the activity of talent scouts. In addition, at the same time, it is also the activity of talent scouts. Over the years he has discovered more than 70 players, then finished among professionals and in Serie A.

== List of players discovered ==
"In this list some of the most famous players discovered by Vittorio Scantamburlo"

Alessandro del Piero, Filippo Maniero, Ivone De Franceschi, Luigi Capuzzo, Adriano Zancopè, Carlo Perrone, Andrea Seno, Andrea Manzo, Luigi Sartor, Marco Rigoni, Marco Andreolli, Daniele Gastaldello, Luca Rossettini and Jerry Mbakogu.

== Bibliography ==
His career has been written the book Ho scoperto Del Piero. La storia di Vittorio Scantamburlo.
