= Luciano Nobili =

Italian footballer

Personal information
- Date of birth: 30 January 1933
- Place of birth: Reggio Emilia, Italy
- Date of death: 10 December 2016 (aged 83)
- Place of death: Reggio Emilia, Italy
- Position: Defender

Senior career*
Years	Team	Apps	(Gls)
1956–1957	Palermo	2	(0)
1957–1959	Reggiana	77	(0)
1960–1963	Pescara	79	(0)
- * Club domestic league appearances and goals

Luciano Nobili (30 January 1933 – 10 December 2016) was an Italian footballer.
