= 2016 Campeonato Nacional da Guiné-Bissau =

Campeonato Nacional da Guiné-Bissau
- Season: 2016

The 2016 Campeonato Nacional da Guiné-Bissau season is the top level of football competition in Guinea-Bissau. It began on 16 January 2016. The season was suspended after seven rounds and eventually cancelled for financial reasons on May 6 2016.
