= Aleksandr Syomin (footballer) =

Soviet footballer (1943-2016)

Personal information
- Full name: Aleksandr Vasilyevich Syomin
- Date of birth: 9 August 1943
- Place of birth: Baku, USSR
- Date of death: 14 October 2016 (aged 73)
- Place of death: Moscow, Russia
- Position: Defender

Senior career*
Years	Team	Apps	(Gls)
1963–1964	Neftchi Baku		
1965	FC Kairat		
1966	FC Ararat Yerevan	35	(4)
1967–1972	Neftchi Baku	77	(0)

International career
1968	USSR	1	(0)
- * Club domestic league appearances and goals

Aleksandr Vasilyevich Syomin (Russian: Александр Васильевич Сёмин; 9 August 1943 – 14 October 2016) was a Soviet football player.

== International career ==
Syomin played his only game for USSR on 16 June 1968 in a friendly against Austria (he was the team captain for the game).
