= 2016 Seychelles First Division =

Seychelles First Division
- Season: 2016
- Champions: Côte d'Or FC

The 2016 Seychelles First Division was the top level football competition in Seychelles. It was played from 10 March to 1 December 2016.

== Standings ==
 1.Côte d'Or (Praslin)                     21  14  3  4  45-21  45  Champions
 2.Saint Michel United FC (Anse-aux-Pins)  20  12  2  6  38-23  38
 3.La Passe FC (La Passe)                  22   9  8  5  40-23  35
 4.Foresters (Mont Fleuri)                 21  10  5  6  34-26  35
 5.Saint Louis Suns United (Victoria)      19  10  3  6  31-32  33
 6.Lightstars FC (Grande Anse)             21   9  4  8  39-37  31
 7.Anse Réunion FC (Anse Réunion)          20   7  8  5  24-23  29
 8.Revengers FC (Praslin)                  21   7  7  7  26-26  28
 9.Northern Dynamo (Glacis)                20   7  7  6  30-36  28
10. The Lions (Cascade)                     19   7  4  8  23-26  25
------------------------------------------------------------------
11.Saint John Bosco (Pointe La Rue)        22   4  5 13  19-32  17  Relegation Playoff
------------------------------------------------------------------
 -.Plaisance FC (Plaisance)                22   0  0 22   7-51   0  Relegated
