= Football in Madagascar =

- Governing body: Malagasy Football Federation
- National team: national football team

Club competitions
- THB Champions League

International competitions
- Champions League; CAF Confederation Cup; Super Cup; FIFA Club World Cup; FIFA World Cup(National Team); African Cup of Nations(National Team)

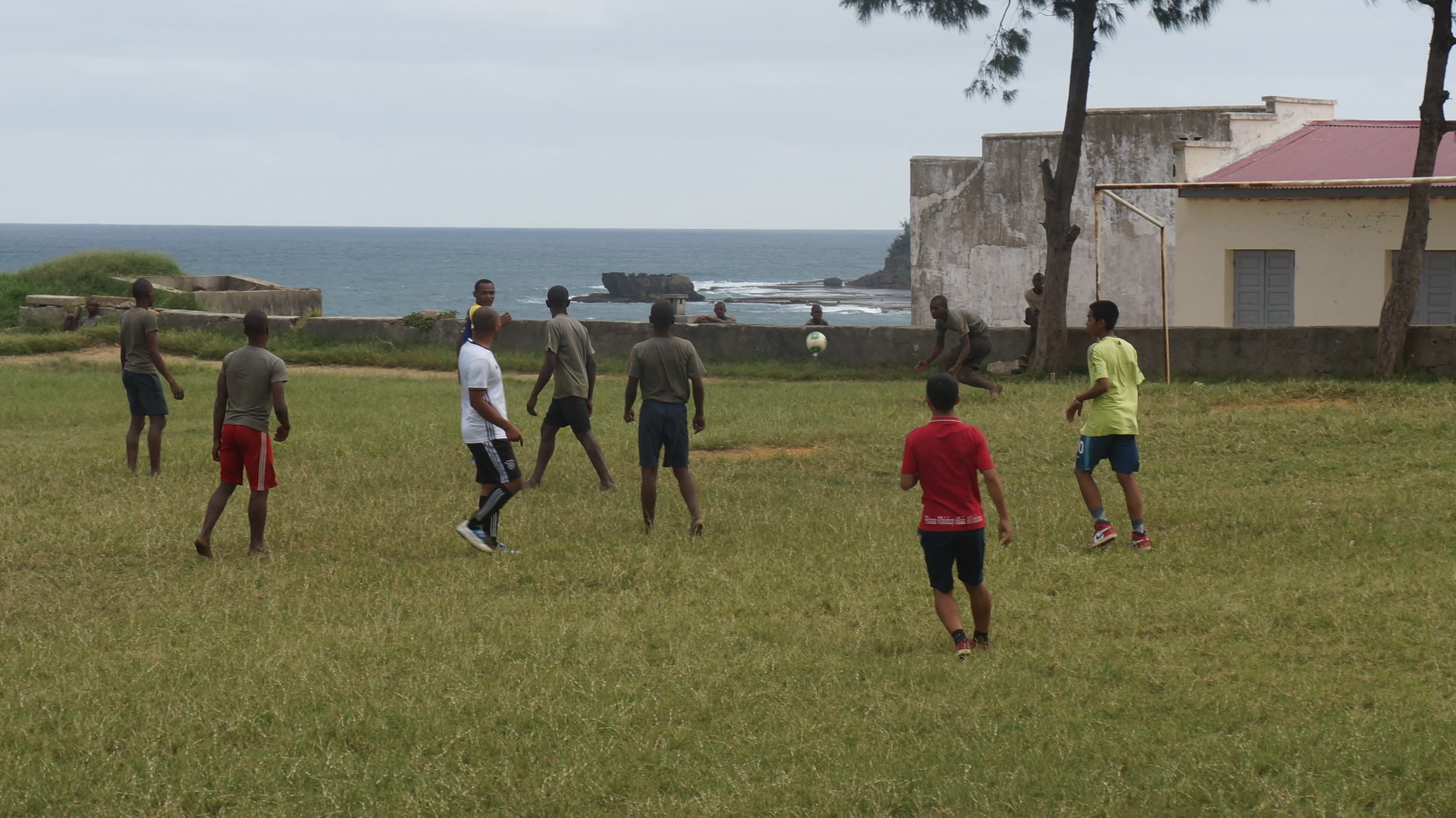
Football in Madagascar.

Football is, along with rugby union, one of the most popular sports in the African island nation of Madagascar. Approximately 25% of the people in Madagascar are considered association football fans. Rugby union is the most popular sport in Madagascar, followed by football. Football is governed in the country by the Malagasy Football Federation.

== International ==
Madagascar's national football team, nicknamed the Barea, has not had great success internationally having never qualified for a FIFA World Cup. They have performed well in some minor competitions however, advancing to the semifinals in the COSAFA Cup (contested between national teams from Southern Africa) in 2008 and winning the football portion of the Indian Ocean Games twice. Some of the country's best players have played professionally overseas, mostly in France.

Madagascar reached the quarterfinals in the 2019 Africa Cup of Nations, beating teams such as Nigeria and DR Congo . This was the first time the country has qualified for an African Cup of Nations. In 2022 Madagascar reached the 3rd place of the African Nations Championship.

== Domestic ==
Madagascar has an unusual domestic arrangement of leagues. The THB Champions League is the country's most prestigious club honor, but clubs qualify for it annually from one of the 22 regional leagues, much like in the UEFA Champions League. The Anamalanga Regional League is the most notable of these regional leagues, which includes the capital of Antananarivo and domestic powerhouses like Ajesaia and AS Adema. The country's main cup competition is the Coupe de Madagascar, whose winners play the THB Champions League winner in the Super Coupe de Madagascar.

In 2019 the Malagasy Football Federation announced the commencement of a new professional league, the Malagasy Pro League.

== League system ==
Level	League(s)/Division(s)
1	Malagasy Regional Leagues; 22 leagues

== Football stadiums in Madagascar ==
#	Stadium	City	Capacity	Tenants	Image
1	Mahamasina Municipal Stadium	Antananarivo	40,880	Madagascar national football team	
2	Barikadimy Stadium	Toamasina	25,000		
3	Stade CNaPS Sport	Toamasina	15,000		

== Attendances ==
The average attendance per top-flight football league season and the club with the highest average attendance:

Season	League average	Best club	Best club average
2019 Division 1	859	Fosa Juniors	1,243

Source: League page on Wikipedia

== See also ==
- Lists of stadiums
