= Klaas Bakker =

Dutch footballer (1926–2016)

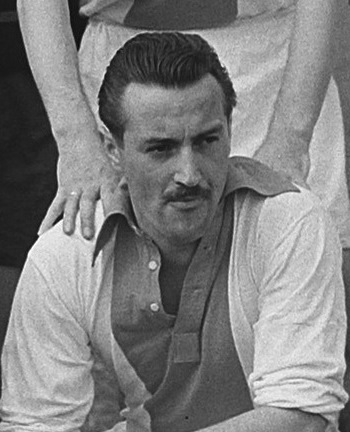
- Klaas Bakker in 1954

Personal information
- Date of birth: 22 April 1926
- Place of birth: Amsterdam, Netherlands
- Date of death: 3 January 2016 (aged 89)
- Place of death: Amstelveen, Netherlands
- Positions: Striker; midfielder

Senior career*
Years	Team	Apps	(Gls)
1943–1951	De Volewijckers		
1951–1957	Ajax	169	(37)
- * Club domestic league appearances and goals

Klaas Bakker (22 April 1926 – 3 January 2016) was a Dutch footballer. He played as a midfielder and striker.

== Club career ==
Bakker played for De Volewijckers between 1943 and 1951, and later for Ajax until 1957. He was born in Amsterdam, North Holland. His last season was the first of the newly-formed Eredivisie.

Bakker died on 3 January 2016 in Amstelveen, aged 89.

== Statistics for Ajax ==
Club	Season	League		Cup		Total	
Club	Season	Apps	Goals	Apps	Goals	Apps	Goals
Ajax	1951/52	29	11	-	-	29	11
Ajax	1952/53	24	2	-	-	24	2
Ajax	1953/54	25	7	-	-	25	7
Ajax	1954/55	24	3	-	-	24	3
Ajax	1955/56	33	12	-	-	33	11
Ajax	1956/57	34	2	3	0	37	2
Total		169	37	3	0	172	37
