= Women's football in Switzerland =

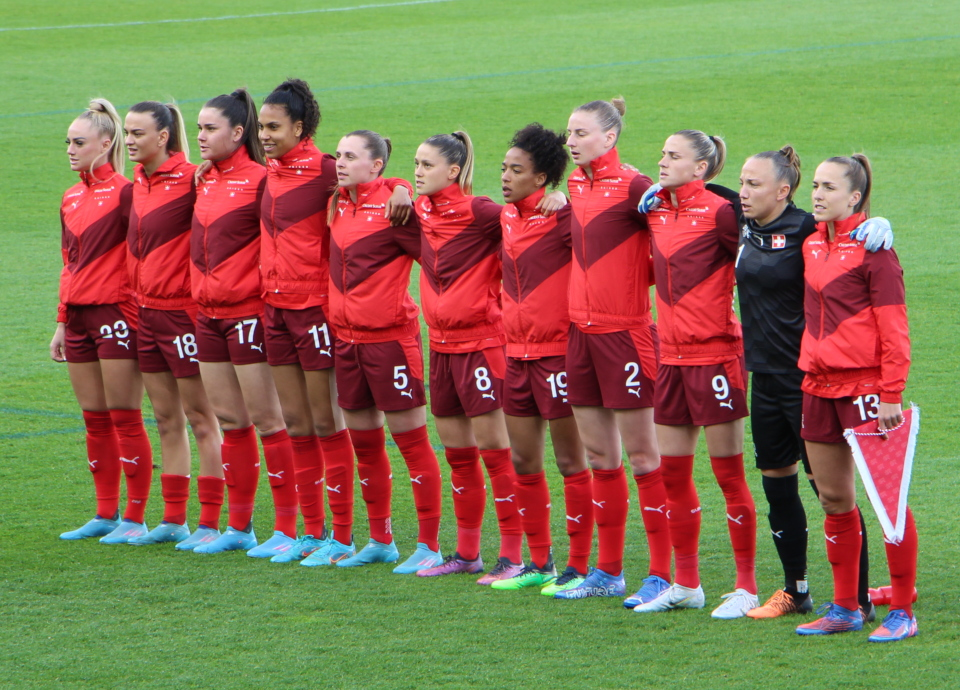
- Switzerland women's national football team
- Governing body: Swiss Football Association
- National team: Women's national team

National competitions
- Swiss Cup

Club competitions
- Swiss Women's Super League

International competitions
- Champions League; FIFA Women's World Cup (National Team); European Championship (National Team); Olympics (National Team)

Women's football in Switzerland was founded in with the Swiss Women's Super League on April 24, 1970. Women in Switzerland experienced prejudice for playing football. As of 2023, there are more than 30,000 females playing in around 800 teams across Switzerland.

Switzerland is expected host the UEFA Women's Euro 2025.

== History ==
The first recorded instance of women's football in Switzerland was in 1923. The newspaper Le Sport Suisse reported on the organisational association of football-loving women in Geneva under the name Les Sportive on the initiative of Florida Pianzola.

In the 1960s, due to women being banned from planning football but participated in amateur football tournaments. In 1965, Monika and Silvia Stahel founded the football club FC Goitschel in Murgenthal. They wrote to the Swiss Football Association asking them to be able to play football officially. The Swiss FA responded with declined the sisters request, offered the ladies opportunity to become referees.

Madeleine Boll became a media sensation in 1965 when she became the first licensed female footballer in Switzerland, after the Swiss Football Association didn't realise Boll was female. She had first taken part in FC Sion's youth training and then applied for the license. With the license, she was able to take part in the pre-match of the first European Cup match between FC Sion and Galatasaray. Boll's presence attracted media interest from all over the world, and Boll had her license was rescinded. Due to the media attention, Madeleine Boll was signed by Serie A team Gommagomma, and played from 1970 to 1974, then for Real Juventus. Boll's popularity sparked massive increase in participation of women's football in Switzerland.

== Club football ==
Swiss Women's Super League is the highest tier of women's football in Switzerland.

On 21 February 1968, the first women's football club was founded in Zurich, the Damenfussballclub Zürich (DFC Zurich) which was founded by Trudy Moser and Ursula Moser. This led to more women's football teams emerging 1968 to 1971. Independent clubs sprang up all over Switzerland to start the formation of la Ligue suisse de football féminin on 24 April 1970. A year later, new regulation were implemented from the 1971/72 season, only teams affiliated with a 'men's club' would be allowed to participate in the league.

In 1993 the la Ligue suisse de football féminin was dissolved to become part of the Swiss football association. The first cup winner was DFC Sion. On 15 May 1993, the decision was made to integrate the clubs into the Swiss Football Association.

== National team ==
Since the 21st Century Switzerland has seen an upsurge of success with the national team qualifying for the 2015 FIFA Women's World Cup and 2023 FIFA Women's World Cup.
