= Étienne Juillard =

French geographer and scientist

Étienne Julliard (23 February 1914 - 11 November 2006) was a French geographer and historian. He was born in Paris and died in Hyeres. Julliard was a professor at the faculty of letters and human sciences at the University of Strasbourg, where he also served as a director from 1965 to 1968.

Juillard's books include L'économie du Canada [The Economy of Canada] (1964), Région et Régionalisation dans la Géographie française et dans d'autres sciences sociales [Region and Regionalization in French Geography and in Other Social Sciences] (1967, with Paul Claval), and L'Europe rhénane, géographie d'un grand espace [Rhine Europe: Geography of a Large Space] (1968).
