= 2015–16 French Guiana Division d'Honneur =

The 2015–16 French Guiana Division d'Honneur was the 43rd season of top-flight football in the French Guiana.

== Table ==
| Pos | Team | Pld | W | D | L | GF | GA | GD | Pts | Qualification or relegation |
|---|---|---|---|---|---|---|---|---|---|---|
| 1 | Matoury (C) | 22 | 17 | 2 | 3 | 46 | 17 | +29 | 53 | 2017 CFU Club Championship, 2016–17 Coupe de France |
| 2 | Le Geldar | 22 | 14 | 2 | 6 | 43 | 24 | +19 | 44 | 2017 CFU Club Championship, 2016–17 Coupe de France |
| 3 | Cayenne | 22 | 12 | 3 | 7 | 35 | 27 | +8 | 39 | |
| 4 | Agouado | 22 | 12 | 2 | 8 | 45 | 40 | +5 | 38 | |
| 5 | Etoile Matoury | 22 | 8 | 8 | 6 | 36 | 34 | +2 | 32 | |
| 6 | Macouria | 14 | 3 | 1 | 10 | 19 | 33 | −14 | 10 | |
| 7 | Remire | 14 | 2 | 3 | 9 | 15 | 33 | −18 | 9 | |
| 8 | Kouroucien | 14 | 1 | 0 | 13 | 7 | 50 | −43 | 3 | |
| 9 | Iracoubo | 0 | 0 | 0 | 0 | 0 | 0 | 0 | 0 | |
| 10 | Grand Santi | 0 | 0 | 0 | 0 | 0 | 0 | 0 | 0 | Qualification to the Relegation playoffs |
| 11 | Cosma Foot | 0 | 0 | 0 | 0 | 0 | 0 | 0 | 0 | Relegation |
| 12 | Montjoly | 0 | 0 | 0 | 0 | 0 | 0 | 0 | 0 | Relegation |

Updated to match(es) played on 30 May 2016.
(C) Champions
