= Football in Malawi =

- Country: Malawi
- Governing body: Football Association of Malawi
- National team: Men's · Women's

Club competitions
- Malawi Premier Division

International competitions
- Champions League; CAF Confederation Cup; Super Cup; FIFA Club World Cup; FIFA World Cup(National Team); African Cup of Nations(National Team)

The sport of football in the country of Malawi is run by the Football Association of Malawi. The association administers the national football team, as well as the Super League of Malawi. Football is the most popular sport in Malawi.

== History ==
The Nyasaland Football Association was formed in 1938.

== National team ==
In the 2021 Africa Cup of Nations Malawi reached the second round of the competition for the first time.

== Women's national team ==
At WAFCON 2026, the Malawi women's national team finished as runners-up in their debut appearance, earning qualification for the 2027 Women's World Cup in the process.

== Bibliography ==
- A History of Nyasaland and Malawi Football: Volume 1 1935 to 1969 ISBN 9781665598408

== Football stadiums in Malawi ==
#	Tenants	Location	Stadium	Capacity	Image
1	Mighty Wanderers, Nyasa Big Bullets	Blantyre	Kamuzu Stadium	65,000	
2	Malawi national football team, Silver Strikers	Lilongwe	Bingu National Stadium	41,100	
3	Civil Service United, Kamuzu Barracks, Mchinji Extreme FC	Lilongwe	Civo Stadium	25,000	
4	Chitipa United, Karonga United	Karonga	Karonga Stadium	20,000	
5	Ekwendeni Hammers, Moyale Barracks	Mzuzu	Mzuzu Stadium	15,000	
6	Bangwe All Stars	Blantyre	Mpira Stadium	6,244	
7	Dedza Dynamos	Dedza	Dedza Stadium	6,000	
8	Blue Eagles	Lilongwe	Nankhaka Stadium	5,000	

== Support ==
Twitter research from 2015 found that the most popular English Premier League club in Malawi was Arsenal, with 29% of Malawian Premier League fans following the club, closely followed by Manchester United (26%) and Chelsea (16%).

== See also ==
- Lists of stadiums
