= 2016 Benin Premier League =

Benin Premier League
- Season: 2016

The 2016 Benin Premier League (Championnat de transition de première division) started on 2 March 2016.

== First stage ==
=== Poule A ===
1.ASPAC (Cotonou)                             12   7  3  2  13- 7  24  Qualified
2.Buffles du Borgou de Parakou (Borgou)       12   7  2  3  16-11  23  Qualified
3.Energie FC (Cotonou)                        12   6  1  5  14- 8  19  Qualified
4.Mogas 90 FC                                 12   4  5  3  14-14  17  Qualified

5.AS Police                                   12   4  5  3  11-12  17
6.Panthères de Djougou                        12   2  3  7  13-19   9

7.AS Tonnerre FC                              12   2  1  9   5-15   7  Relegated

Poule B

1.Union Sportive Sèmè Kraké                   12   7  4  1  24- 6  25  Qualified
2.JA Cotonou                                  12   6  4  2  12- 8  22  Qualified
3.ESAE                                        12   5  5  2   9- 6  20  Qualified
4.Ayéma d'Adjarra FC                          12   4  2  6   8-11  14  Qualified
----------------------------------------------------------------------
5.Requins de l'Atlantique (Cotonou)           12   4  2  6  10-14  14
6.Dragons de l'Ouémé FC                       12   4  1  7   9-17  13
----------------------------------------------------------------------
7.AS Oussou Saka (Porto-Novo)                 12   1  4  7   4-14   7  Relegated

== Final stage ==
Season abandoned before start of final stage.
