= Uzama Douglas =

Nigerian footballer

Personal information
- Full name: Uzama Douglas Esewi
- Date of birth: 7 December 1998
- Place of birth: Benin City, Nigeria
- Date of death: 29 December 2016 (aged 18)
- Place of death: Benin City, Nigeria
- Height: 1.81 m (5 ft 11 1/2 in)
- Positions: Defender; midfielder

Team information
- Current team: Gombe United F.C.
- Number: 27

Youth career
- 2010: Karamone

Senior career*
Years	Team	Apps	(Gls)
2014–2016	Gombe United F.C.	39	(3)

International career^{‡}
2014	Nigeria U-17	8	(1)
2016	Nigeria U-20	4	(0)
- * Club domestic league appearances and goals as of 2 November 2016 ‡ National team caps and goals as of 2 November 2016

Uzama Douglas Esewi (7 December 1998 – 29 December 2016) was a Nigerian football player in the position of defender for the Nigerian U-17 and U-20 teams. He was signed on loan from Karamone by the Nigeria National League team Gombe United F.C. in the second division league and assisted the team to be promoted into the Nigeria Premier League in 2016.

== Career ==
Uzama Douglas was discovered by Karamone and made his professional debut with Gombe United F.C. in 2014 then was promoted into the Nigeria Premier League in 2016 season. He received interest from top Nigeria Premier League and top European teams since he had been in the Nigeria U-17 in 2015 and presently in the Nigeria U-20.

He was shot and killed on 29 December 2016 in Benin City.
