= Sergio Ferrari =

Italian footballer (1943–2016)

- Ferrari during his time in Verona, c. 1971

Personal information
- Date of birth: 17 September 1943
- Place of birth: Oggiono, Italy
- Date of death: 2 April 2016 (aged 72)
- Height: 1.77 m (5 ft 9 1/2 in)
- Position: Midfielder

Senior career*
Years	Team	Apps	(Gls)
1962–1967	Lecco	69	(3)
1967–1969	Roma	41	(0)
1969–1972	Verona	79	(2)
1972–1974	Catanzaro	65	(2)
1974–1978	Novara	131	(0)
1978–1979	Alessandria	26	(1)
- * Club domestic league appearances and goals

Sergio Ferrari (17 September 1943 – 2 April 2016) was an Italian professional football player.

He played for 6 seasons (143 games, 3 goals) in the Serie A for Calcio Lecco 1912, A.S. Roma and Hellas Verona F.C.
