= Proloy Saha =

Indian footballer

Personal information
- Date of birth: 1968
- Place of birth: West Bengal, India
- Date of death: 24 March 2016 (aged 47)
- Place of death: Odisha, India
- Position: Defender

Senior career*
Years	Team	Apps	(Gls)
- East Bengal

International career
- India
- * Club domestic league appearances and goals

Proloy Saha (1968 – 24 March 2016) was an Indian footballer who played for East Bengal and the national team, as a defender. He was on the India national squad that won the 1993 SAARC Gold Cup.

== Honours ==
India

- SAFF Championship: 1993
