= Ben Koufie =

Ghanaian footballer and sports administrator (1932–2016)

Personal information
- Date of birth: 5 June 1932
- Place of birth: Gold Coast
- Date of death: 4 July 2016 (aged 84)
- Place of death: Accra, Ghana

Senior career*
Years	Team	Apps	(Gls)
- Cornerstones
- Ebusua Dwarfs

International career
1957–1958	Ghana		

Managerial career
- 1970–1973: Ghana
- 1971: Asante Kotoko
- 1972: Great Olympics
- 1976–1979: Africa Sports
- 1979–1980: Akosombo Akotex
- 1988–1992: Zimbabwe
- * Club domestic league appearances and goals

Ben Koufie (5 June 1932 – 4 July 2016) was a Ghanaian football player, coach, and administrator.

== Playing career ==
Koufie played club football for Cornerstones and Ebusua Dwarfs, and represented the national side from 1957 to 1958.

== Coaching career ==
After retiring as a player, Koufie became a coach of the Ghana national team, and managed Zimbabwe from 1988 to 1992.

He led Ghanaian club Asante Kotoko to the Africa Club Championship in 1971, and Great Olympics to the semi-finals a year later. He also coached Ivorian team Africa Sports, and in Ghana with Akosombo Akotex.

== Administrative career ==
Koufie was the technical advisor to the Zimbabwe Football Association from 1981 to 1982, technical director of the Botswana Football Association from 1992 to 2001, and president of the Ghana Football Association from 2001 to 2003.

== Death ==
Koufie died on 4 July 2016 at the Korle-Bu Teaching Hospital in Accra from an undisclosed illness. He was 84.

== Honours ==
There have been calls to rename the Cape Coast Sports Stadium after Koufie.
