= Lim Chiew Peng =

Singaporean footballer

Personal information
- Date of birth: c. 1951
- Place of birth: Singapore
- Date of death: 27 November 2016 (aged 65)
- Place of death: Singapore
- Position: Goalkeeper

Lim Chiew Peng (c. 1951–27 November 2016) was a Singaporean professional footballer who played as a goalkeeper.

== Career ==
Lim had played in two Malaysia Cup finals in 1976 and 1979 and was part of the team when Singapore won the historic Malaysia Cup in 1977 after 12 years.

He retired on 12 February 1980 after being in the national squad for 10 years.

After his playing days, Lim took to goalkeeper coaching and was with five-time S.League champion Tampines Rovers FC and worked at Komoco Motors.

== Death ==
Lim died of cancer, aged 65, on 27 November 2016.

== Honours ==
=== International ===
- Malaysia Cup : 1977
