= Nadine Juillard =

French footballer (1954-2016)

Personal information
- Full name: Nadine Cécile Juillard
- Date of birth: 4 January 1954
- Place of birth: Fismes, France
- Date of death: 4 December 2016 (aged 62)
- Height: 1.62 m (5 ft 4 in)
- Position: Midfielder

Senior career*
Years	Team	Apps	(Gls)
1968–1977	Reims		

International career
1971	France	1	(0)
- * Club domestic league appearances and goals

Nadine Juillard (4 January 1954 – 4 December 2016) was a French professional footballer who played as a midfielder for French club Reims and the France national team.

== International career ==
Nadine Juillard represented France in the first FIFA-sanctioned women's international against the Netherlands.

== Honours ==
- Division 1 Féminine
  - Winners (3): 1974–75, 1975–76, 1976–77
