= Boy-Boy Mosia =

South African soccer player

Personal information
- Full name: Simphiwe Mosia Boy-Boy
- Date of birth: 1 July 1985
- Place of birth: Pretoria, South Africa
- Date of death: 23 July 2016 (aged 31)
- Place of death: Hammarsdale, South Africa
- Height: 1.55 m (5 ft 1 in)
- Position: Attacking midfielder

Youth career
- 1994–1999: MG Stars
- 1999–2000: Juventus FC
- 2000–2001: Amazulu
- 2001–2002: Transnet Sport School of Excellence
- 2003: Chelsea F.C.

Senior career*
Years	Team	Apps	(Gls)
2001–2002	Ajax Cape Town	1	(0)
2002–2003	Orlando Pirates	2	(0)
2003–2004	Chelsea	0	(0)
2004–2005	Westerlo	16	(0)
2004–2006	→ Dessel Sport (loan)	0	(0)
2006–2008	→ OH Leuven (loan)	53	(7)
2008–2009	Mpumalanga Black Aces	?	(?)

International career^{‡}
2001–2002	South Africa U-20	4	(0)
2006	South Africa U-23	2	(0)
- * Club domestic league appearances and goals as of 23 March 2009 ‡ National team caps and goals as of 23 March 2009

Simphiwe Mosia Boy-Boy (1 July 1985 – 23 July 2016), better known as Boy-Boy Mosia, was a South African soccer player. Mosia died after suddenly falling ill and collapsing while with friends on 23 July 2016, aged 31.

== Career ==
He began his career in 1994 with MG Stars, and in 1999 he was scouted by Juventus, where he played for a year in Italy. After the year he left Italy and moved back to South Africa where he signed a contract with Amazulu. In 2001, he left the club and moved to the Transnet Sport School of Excellence in Johannesburg. In January 2003 he was scouted by Chelsea F.C., where he left after just 7 months and moved to K.V.C. Westerlo.

The quick paced winger played for the Chelsea reserve team, and also had trials at Manchester United. In 2004, he played for K.V.C. Westerlo until he was loaned to Oud-Heverlee Leuven in the 2007–08 season in the Belgian Second Division.

On 28 November 2008, Mosia signed a six-month contract with Mpumalanga Black Aces of the PSL, before leaving the club only a month later due to the "lack of professionalism" at the club.

At 155 cm, Mosia was the smallest player in the Belgian First Division during the 2005–06 season.
