= Aurelio Scagnellato =

Italian footballer and managing director (1930-2008)

Personal information
- Full name: Aurelio Scagnellato
- Date of birth: 26 October 1930
- Place of birth: Franzensfeste, Italy
- Date of death: 10 July 2008 (aged 77)
- Place of death: Padua, Italy
- Position: Defender

Youth career
- ????–1950: Plateola
- 1950–1951: Luparense

Senior career*
Years	Team	Apps	(Gls)
1951–1964	Padova	349	(0)
Total		349	(0)
- * Club domestic league appearances and goals

Aurelio Scagnellato (26 October 1930 – 10 July 2008) was an Italian football defender and managing director. He is known for his time with the successful Padova side during the late 1950s and early 1960s.

== Career ==
Scagnellato spent his entire professional career with Padova, and was part of the cub's famous defensive line under manager Rocco – nicknamed The Panzer of Rocco – that contributed decisively to the best ever league placement in the history of the Venetian club, a third-place finish during the 1957–58 Serie A season.

With 349 appearances, he is the player with the most matches played in the history of Padova.

After retiring from football, he took on a series of technical and managerial positions at the club, and also held the position of the team's Sporting Director.

== Career statistics ==
Club performance			League		Cup		Continental		Total	
Season	Club	League	Apps	Goals	Apps	Goals	Apps	Goals	Apps	Goals
Italy			League		Coppa Italia		Europe		Total	
1951–52	Padova	Serie A	7	0						
1952–53	Padova	Serie B	33	0						
1953–54	Padova	Serie B	32	0						
1954–55	Padova	Serie B	32	0						
1955–56	Padova	Serie B	32	0						
1956–57	Padova	Serie A	30	0						
1957–58	Padova	Serie A	32	0						
1958–59	Padova	Serie A	34	0						
1959–60	Padova	Serie A	30	0						
1960–61	Padova	Serie A	26	0						
1961–62	Padova	Serie A	28	0						
1962–63	Padova	Serie B	32	0						
1963–64	Padova	Serie B	1	0						
Total	Italy		349	0						
Career total			349	0						
