= 2013 in association football =

The following are the scheduled events of association football for the year 2013 throughout the world.

== Events ==
=== Men's national teams ===
==== Senior ====
- 5 – 18 January: 21st Arabian Gulf Cup in Bahrain
  - (gold) United Arab Emirates (2nd title)
  - (silver) Iraq
  - (bronze) Kuwait
  - 4th: Bahrain
- 18 – 27 January: 2013 Copa Centroamericana in Costa Rica
  - (gold) Costa Rica (7th title)
  - (silver) Honduras
  - (bronze) El Salvador
  - 4th: Belize
- 19 January – 10 February: 2013 Africa Cup of Nations in South Africa
  - (gold) Nigeria (3rd title)
  - (silver) Burkina Faso
  - (bronze) Mali
  - 4th: Ghana
- 15 – 30 June: 2013 FIFA Confederations Cup in Brazil
  - (gold) Brazil (4th title)
  - (silver) Spain
  - (bronze) Italy
  - 4th: Uruguay
- 6 – 20 July: 2013 COSAFA Cup in Zambia
  - (gold) Zambia (4th title)
  - (silver) Zimbabwe
  - (bronze) South Africa
  - 4th: Lesotho
- 7 – 28 July: 2013 CONCACAF Gold Cup in the United States
  - (gold) United States (5th title)
  - (silver) Panama
- 20 – 28 July: 2013 EAFF East Asian Cup in South Korea
  - (gold) Japan (1st title)
  - (silver) China
  - (bronze) South Korea
  - 4th: Australia
- 20 September – 2 October: 2013 SAFF Championship in Nepal
  - (gold) Afghanistan (1st title)
  - (silver) India
- 26 October – 2 November: 2013 UEMOA Tournament in Ivory Coast
  - (gold) Burkina Faso (1st title)
  - (silver) Benin
- 27 November – 12 December: 2013 CECAFA Cup in Kenya
  - (gold) Kenya (6th title)
  - (silver) Sudan
  - (bronze) Zambia
  - 4th: Tanzania

==== Youth ====
- 9 January – 3 February: 2013 South American Youth Championship in Argentina
  - (gold) Colombia (3rd title)
  - (silver) Paraguay
  - (bronze) Uruguay
  - 4th: Chile
- 18 February – 3 March: 2013 CONCACAF U-20 Championship in Mexico
  - (gold) Mexico (12th title)
  - (silver) United States
  - (bronze) El Salvador
  - 4th: Cuba
- 7 – 15 March: 2013 Central American Games in Costa Rica
  - (gold) Honduras (3rd title)
  - (silver) Costa Rica
  - (bronze) El Salvador
  - 4th: Guatemala
- 16 – 30 March: 2013 African U-20 Championship in Algeria
  - (gold) Egypt (4th title)
  - (silver) Ghana
  - (bronze) Nigeria
  - 4th: Mali
- 17 – 30 March: 2013 OFC U-20 Championship in Fiji
  - (gold) New Zealand (5th title)
  - (silver) Fiji
  - (bronze) Vanuatu
  - 4th: New Caledonia
- 6 – 19 April: 2013 CONCACAF U-17 Championship in Panama
  - (gold) Mexico (5th title)
  - (silver) Panama
  - (bronze) Canada
  - 4th: Honduras
- 2 – 26 April: 2013 South American Under-17 Football Championship in Argentina
  - (gold) Argentina
  - (silver) Venezuela
  - (bronze) Brazil
  - 4th:Uruguay
- 13 – 27 April: 2013 African U-17 Championship in Morocco
  - (gold) Ivory Coast (1st title)
  - (silver) Nigeria
  - (bronze) Tunisia
  - 4th:Morocco
- 17–25 April: OFC Under 17 Championship in Vanuatu
  - (gold) New Zealand (5th title)
  - (silver) New Caledonia
  - (bronze) Vanuatu
  - 4th: Fiji
- 5 – 17 May: 2013 UEFA European Under-17 Football Championship in Slovakia
  - (gold) Russia (3rd title) ^{1}
  - (silver) Italy
- 28 May – 8 June: 2013 U-21 Toulon Tournament in France
  - (gold) Brazil (7th title)
  - (silver) Colombia
  - (bronze) France
  - 4th: Portugal
- 5 – 18 June: 2013 UEFA European Under-21 Football Championship in Israel
  - (gold) Spain
  - (silver) Italy
- 21 June – 13 July: 2013 FIFA U-20 World Cup in Turkey
  - (gold) France (1st title)
  - (silver) Uruguay
  - (bronze) Ghana
  - 4th: Iraq
- 20 July – 1 August: 2013 UEFA European Under-19 Football Championship in Lithuania
  - (gold) Serbia (1st title)
  - (silver) France
  - (bronze) Spain
  - 4th: Portugal
- 17 October – 8 November: 2013 FIFA U-17 World Cup in the United Arab Emirates
  - (gold) Nigeria
  - (silver) Mexico
  - (bronze) Sweden
  - 4th: Argentina
- 7 December – 21 December: 2013 Southeast Asian Games in Myanmar
  - (gold) Thailand
  - (silver) Indonesia
  - (bronze) Singapore
  - 4th: Malaysia
- 1: 2nd title for Russia since the Dissolution of the Soviet Union in 1991. UEFA records treat Russia and the Soviet Union as the same.

=== Women's national teams ===
- 6 – 13 March: 2013 Algarve Cup in Portugal
  - (gold) United States (9th title)
  - (silver) Germany
  - (bronze) Norway
  - 4th: Sweden
- 25 – 28 June: 2013 UEFA Women's U-17 Championship in Switzerland
  - (gold) Poland (1st title)
  - (silver) Sweden
  - (bronze) Spain
  - 4th: Belgium
- 10 – 28 July: UEFA Women's Euro 2013 in Sweden
  - (gold) Germany (8th title)
  - (silver) Norway
  - (bronze) Denmark
  - 4th: Sweden
- 20 – 27 July: 2013 EAFF Women's East Asian Cup in South Korea
  - (gold) North Korea (1st title)
  - (silver) Japan
  - (bronze) South Korea
  - 4th: China
- 19 – 31 August: 2013 UEFA Women's U-19 Championship in Wales
  - (gold) France (3rd title)
  - (silver) England
  - (bronze) Finland, Germany
- 26 September – 6 October: 2013 AFC U-16 Women's Championship in China
  - (gold) Japan (3rd title)
  - (silver) North Korea
  - (bronze) China
  - 4th: Thailand
- 11 – 20 October: 2013 AFC U-19 Women's Championship in China
  - (gold) South Korea (2nd title)
  - (silver) North Korea
  - (bronze) China
  - 4th: Japan

== News ==
- June 20 – Abby Wambach becomes the all-time leading international goal scorer for either men or women. Her four goals for the USA in a friendly against South Korea in Harrison, New Jersey bring her career total to 160, surpassing the 158 of fellow American Mia Hamm.

== Fixed dates for national team matches ==
Scheduled international matches per their International Match Calendar. Also known as FIFA International Day/Date(s).

- 6 February
- 23–27 March
- 8–12 June
- 21 August
- 7–11 September
- 12–16 October
- 16–20 November

== Club continental champions ==
=== Men ===
Region	Tournament	Champion	Title	Last honor
AFC (Asia)	2013 AFC Champions League	(China) Guangzhou Evergrande	1st	—
AFC (Asia)	2013 AFC Cup	Kuwait SC	3rd	2012
AFC (Asia)	2013 AFC President's Cup	(Turkmenistan) Balkan	1st	—
CAF (Africa)	2013 CAF Champions League	(Egypt) Al-Ahly	8th	2012
CAF (Africa)	2013 CAF Confederation Cup	(Tunisia) Sfaxien	3rd	2008
CAF (Africa)	2013 CAF Super Cup	(Egypt) Al-Ahly	5th	2009
CONCACAF (North and Central America, Caribbean)	2012–13 CONCACAF Champions League	(Mexico) Monterrey	3rd	2011–12
CONCACAF (North and Central America, Caribbean)	2013 CFU Club Championship	N/A	N/A	N/A
CONMEBOL (South America)	2013 Copa Libertadores	(Brazil) Atlético Mineiro	1st	—
CONMEBOL (South America)	2013 Copa Sudamericana	(Argentina) Lanús	1st	—
CONMEBOL (South America)	2013 Recopa Sudamericana	(Brazil) Corinthians	1st	—
OFC (Oceania)	2012–13 OFC Champions League	(New Zealand) Auckland City	5th	2011–12
UEFA (Europe)	2012–13 UEFA Champions League	(Germany) Bayern Munich	5th	2000–01
UEFA (Europe)	2012–13 UEFA Europa League	(England) Chelsea	1st	—
UEFA (Europe)	2013 UEFA Super Cup	(Germany) Bayern Munich	1st	—
UAFA (Arab States)	2012–13 UAFA Club Cup	(Algeria) USM Alger	1st	—
UAFA (Arab States)	2012–13 GCC Champions League	(United Arab Emirates) Baniyas	1st	—
FIFA (Worldwide)	2013 FIFA Club World Cup	(Germany) Bayern Munich	1st	—

=== Women ===
Region	Tournament	Champion	Title	Last honor
CONMEBOL (South America)	2013 Copa Libertadores Femenina	(Brazil) São José	2nd	2011
UEFA (Europe)	2012–13 UEFA Women's Champions League	(Germany) VfL Wolfsburg	1st	—
Worldwide	2013 International Women's Club Championship	(Japan) INAC Kobe Leonessa	1st	—

== Domestic leagues ==
=== CONCACAF nations ===
==== Men ====
Nation	League	Champion	Title	Last honor
Anguilla	2012–13 AFA League	Attackers FC	4th	2008–09
Antigua and Barbuda	2012–13 Antigua and Barbuda Premier Division	Old Road	2nd	2011–12
Aruba	2012–13 Aruban Division di Honor	La Fama	1st	—
(The Bahamas) Bahamas	2013 BFA Senior League	IM Bears FC	6th	2011–12
Barbados	2013 Barbados Premier Division	Barbados Defence Force	3rd	2007
Belize	2013 Premier League of Belize – Closing Season	Police United	1st	—
Belize	2013 Premier League of Belize – Opening Season	Belmopan Bandits	2nd	2012 Opening
Bermuda	2012–13 Bermudian Premier Division	Devonshire Cougars	4th	2008–09
British Virgin Islands	2012–13 BVIFA National Football League	Islanders	4th	2011–12
Cayman Islands	2012–13 Cayman Islands Premier League	Bodden Town	1st	—
Costa Rica	2013 Primera División Verano	Herediano	23rd	2012 Verano
Costa Rica	2013 Primera División Invierno	Alajuelense	29th	2012 Invierno
Cuba	2013 Campeonato Nacional de Fútbol	Villa Clara	13th	2012
Curaçao	2013 Sekshon Pagá	RKSV Centro Dominguito	3rd	2012
Dominica	2012–13 Dominica Premier League	Centre Bath Estate	4th	2010
Dominican Republic	2012–13 Liga Mayor	Moca	10th	2010
El Salvador	2013 Primera División Clausura	Firpo	10th	2008 Clausura
El Salvador	2013 Primera División Apertura	Isidro Metapán	8th	2012 Apertura
Grenada	2013 Premier Division	Hard Rock	3rd	2012
Guatemala	2013 Liga Nacional Clausura	Comunicaciones	26th	2012 Apertura
Guatemala	2013 Liga Nacional Apertura	Comunicaciones	27th	2013 Clausura
Guyana	2012–13 GFF National Super League	Alpha United	4th	2012
Haiti	2013 Championnat National D1	AS Mirebalais	2nd	2004–05
Honduras	2013 Liga Nacional Clausura	Olimpia	27th	2012 Clausura
Honduras	2013 Liga Nacional Apertura	Real España	11th	2010 Apertura
Jamaica	2012–13 National Premier League	Harbour View	4th	2009–10
Mexico	2013 Liga MX Clausura	América	11th	2005 Clausura
Mexico	2013 Liga MX Apertura	León	6th	1991–92
Nicaragua	2013 Primera División Clausura	Real Estelí	12th	2012 Apertura
Nicaragua	2013 Primera División Apertura	Real Estelí	13th	2013 Clausura
Panama	2013 Liga Panameña de Fútbol Clausura	Sporting San Miguelito	1st	—
Panama	2013 Liga Panameña de Fútbol Apertura	Tauro	12th	2012 Clausura
Puerto Rico	2013 Liga Nacional de Fútbol	Sevilla FC Puerto Rico	1st	—
Saint Kitts and Nevis	2012–13 SKNFA Digicel Super League	Newtown United	17th	2011–12
Saint Lucia	2013 Gold Division	Big Players FC	1st	—
Saint Vincent and the Grenadines	2013 NLA Premier League			
Suriname	2012–13 Hoofdklasse	Inter Moengotapoe	5th	2010–11
Trinidad and Tobago	2012–13 TT Pro League	Defence Force	3rd	2010–11
Turks and Caicos Islands	2013 WIV Provo Premier League	Cheshire Hall	2nd	2012
United States/ Canada	2013 Major League Soccer – MLS Cup	Sporting Kansas City	2nd	2000
United States/ Canada	2013 Major League Soccer – Supporters' Shield	New York Red Bulls	1st	—

==== Women ====
Nation	League	Champion	Title	Last honor
United States	2013 NWSL season	Portland Thorns FC	1st	—

=== CONMEBOL nations ===
==== Men ====
Nation	League	Champion	Title	Last honor
Argentina	2013 Primera División Final	Newell's Old Boys	6th	2004 Apertura
Argentina	2013 Primera División Inicial	San Lorenzo	15th	2007 Clausura
Bolivia	2013 Liga Profesional Clausura	Bolívar	23rd	2011
Bolivia	2013 Liga Profesional Apertura	Bolívar	24th	2013 Clausura
Brazil	2013 Campeonato Brasileiro Série A	Cruzeiro	3rd	2003 Campeonato Brasileiro Série A
Chile	2013 Primera División Transición	Unión Española	7th	2005 Apertura
Chile	2013 Primera División Apertura	O'Higgins	1st	—
Colombia	2013 Primera A Apertura	Atlético Nacional	12th	2011 Apertura
Colombia	2013 Primera A Finalización	Atlético Nacional	13th	2013 Apertura
Ecuador	2013 Campeonato Ecuatoriano Serie A	Emelec	11th	2002
Paraguay	2013 Primera División Apertura	Nacional	9th	2011 Apertura
Paraguay	2013 Primera División Clausura	Cerro Porteño	30th	2012 Apertura
Peru	2013 Torneo Descentralizado	Universitario	26th	2009
Uruguay	2012–13 Primera División	Peñarol	49th	2009–10
Venezuela	2012–13 Primera División	Zamora	1st	—

==== Women ====
Nation	League	Champion	Title	Last honor
Brazil	2013 Campeonato Brasileiro de Futebol Feminino	Centro Olímpico	1st	–

=== AFC nations ===
==== Men ====
Nation	League	Champion	Title	Last honor
Afghanistan	2013 Afghan Premier League	Shaheen Asmayee F.C.	1st	—
Australia	2012–13 A-League	Central Coast Mariners	1st	—
Bahrain	2012–13 Bahrain First Division League	Busaiteen	1st	—
Bangladesh	2012–13 Bangladesh Football Premier League	Sheikh Russel	1st	—
Bhutan	2012–13 Bhutan National League	Yeedzin	4th	2009
Brunei	2012–13 Brunei Super League	Indera	1st	—
Cambodia	2013 Cambodian League	Svay Rieng	1st	—
China	2013 Chinese Super League	Guangzhou Evergrande	3rd	2012
Chinese Taipei	2013 Intercity Football League	Tatung	2nd	2007
Guam	2012–13 Guam Men's Soccer League	Quality Distributors	9th	2011–12
Hong Kong	2012–13 Hong Kong First Division League	South China	41st	2009–10
India	2012–13 I-League	Churchill Brothers	2nd	2008–09
Indonesia	2013 Indonesian Premier League	Pro Duta	1st	—
Indonesia	2013 Indonesia Super League	Persipura	3rd	2010–11
Iran	2012–13 Iran Pro League	Esteghlal	8th	2008–09
Iraq	2012–13 Iraqi Elite League	Al Shorta	3rd	1997–98
Jordan	2012–13 Jordan League	Al-Ordon	2nd	2005–06
Japan	2013 J. League Division 1	Sanfrecce Hiroshima	2nd	2012
North Korea	2013 DPR Korea League	April 25	14th	2011
Kuwait	2012–13 Kuwaiti Premier League	Al Kuwait	11th	2007–08
Kyrgyzstan	2013 Kyrgyzstan League	Alay	1st	—
Lebanon	2012–13 Lebanese Premier League	Al-Safa'	2nd	2011–12
Laos	2013 Lao League	SHB Champasak	1st	—
Macau	2013 Campeonato da 1ª Divisão do Futebol	Monte Carlo	5th	2008
Malaysia	2013 Malaysia Super League	LionsXII	1st	—
Maldives	2013 Dhivehi League	New Radiant	3rd	2012
Mongolia	2013 Mongolia Premier League	Erchim	8th	2012
Myanmar	2013 Myanmar National League	Yangon United	3rd	2012
Nepal	2012–13 Martyr's Memorial A-Division League	Three Star	4th	2004
Oman	2012–13 Omani League	Al-Suwaiq	3rd	2010–11
Pakistan	2012–13 Pakistan Premier League	KRL F.C.	3rd	2009
Palestine	2012–13 West Bank Premier League	Shabab Al-Dhahiriya	1st	—
Philippines	2013 United Football League Division 1	Stallion Sta. Lucia	1st	—
Qatar	2012–13 Qatar Stars League	Al Sadd	13th	2006–07
Saudi Arabia	2012–13 Saudi Professional League	Al Fateh	1st	—
Singapore	2013 S.League	Tampines Rovers	5th	2012
South Korea	2013 K League Classic	Pohang Steelers	5th	2007
Sri Lanka	2013 Sri Lanka Football Premier League	Air Force SC	1st	—
Syria	2013 Syrian Premier League	Al-Jaish	12th	2009–10
Tajikistan	2013 Tajik League	Ravshan Kulob	2nd	2012
Thailand	2013 Thai Premier League	Buriram United	3rd	2011
Turkmenistan	2013 Ýokary Liga	HTTU	4th	2009
United Arab Emirates	2012–13 UAE Pro-League	Al Ain	11th	2011–12
Uzbekistan	2013 Uzbek League	Bunyodkor	5th	2011
Vietnam	2013 V-League	Hanoi T&T	2nd	2010
Yemen	2013 Yemeni League	Al Yarmuk Al Rawda	1st	—

==== Women ====
Nation	League	Champion	Title	Last honor
Australia	2012–13 W-League	Sydney FC	2nd	2009
Japan	2013 L. League	INAC Kobe Leonessa	3rd	2012

=== UEFA nations ===
==== Men ====
Nation	League	Champion	Title	Last honor
Albania	2012–13 Albanian Superliga	Skënderbeu Korçë	4th	2011–12
Andorra	2012–13 Primera Divisió	Lusitanos	2nd	2011–12
Armenia	2012–13 Armenian Premier League	Shirak	4th	1999
Austria	2012–13 Austrian Football Bundesliga	FK Austria Wien	23rd	2005–06
Azerbaijan	2012–13 Azerbaijan Premier League	Neftchi Baku	8th	2011–12
Belarus	2013 Belarusian Premier League	BATE Borisov	10th	2012
Belgium	2012–13 Jupiler League	Anderlecht	32nd	2011–12
Bosnia and Herzegovina	2012–13 Premijer Liga	Željezničar Sarajevo	6th	2011–12
Bulgaria	2012–13 A PFG	Ludogorets Razgrad	2nd	2011–12
Croatia	2012–13 Prva HNL	Dinamo Zagreb	15th	2011–12
Cyprus	2012–13 Cypriot First Division	APOEL	22nd	2010–11
Czech Republic	2012–13 Gambrinus liga	Viktoria Plzeň	2nd	2010–11
Denmark	2012–13 Danish Superliga	Copenhagen	10th	2010–11
England	2012–13 Premier League	Manchester United	20th	2010–11
Estonia	2013 Meistriliiga	Levadia Tallinn	8th	2009
Faroe Islands	2013 Vodafonedeildin	Havnar Bóltfelag	22nd	2010
Finland	2013 Veikkausliiga	HJK	26th	2012
France	2012–13 Ligue 1	Paris Saint-Germain	3rd	1993–94
(Georgia (country)) Georgia	2012–13 Umaglesi Liga	Dinamo Tbilisi	13th	2007–08
Germany	2012–13 Fußball-Bundesliga	Bayern Munich	23rd	2009–10
Greece	2012–13 Super League Greece	Olympiacos	40th	2011–12
Hungary	2012–13 NB I	Győri ETO	4th	1982–83
Iceland	2013 Úrvalsdeild	KR	26th	2011
(Republic of Ireland) Ireland	2013 League of Ireland	St Patrick's Athletic	8th	1998–99
Israel	2012–13 Israeli Premier League	Maccabi Tel Aviv	20th	2002–03
Italy	2012–13 Serie A	Juventus	29th	2011–12
Kazakhstan	2013 Kazakhstan Premier League	Aktobe	4th	2009
Latvia	2013 Latvian Higher League	Ventspils	5th	2011
Lithuania	2013 A Lyga	Žalgiris Vilnius	4th	1998–99
Luxembourg	2012–13 Luxembourg National Division	Fola Esch	6th	1929–30
(North Macedonia) Macedonia	2012–13 First Macedonian Football League	Vardar	7th	2011–12
Malta	2012–13 Maltese Premier League	Birkirkara	4th	2009–10
Moldova	2012–13 Moldovan National Division	Sheriff Tiraspol	12th	2011–12
Montenegro	2012–13 Montenegrin First League	Sutjeska	1st	—
Netherlands	2012–13 Eredivisie	Ajax	32nd	2011–12
Northern Ireland	2012–13 IFA Premiership	Cliftonville	4th	1997–98
Norway	2013 Tippeligaen	Strømsgodset	2nd	1970
Poland	2012–13 Ekstraklasa	Legia Warsaw	9th	2005–06
Portugal	2012–13 Primeira Liga	Porto	27th	2011–12
Romania	2012–13 Liga I	Steaua București	24th	2005–06
Russia	2012–13 Russian Premier League	CSKA Moscow	11th	2006
San Marino	2012–13 Campionato Sammarinese di Calcio	Tre Penne	2nd	2011–12
Scotland	2012–13 Scottish Premier League	Celtic	44th	2011–12
Serbia	2012–13 Serbian SuperLiga	Partizan	6th	2011–12
Slovakia	2012–13 Slovak First Football League	Slovan Bratislava	7th	2010–11
Slovenia	2012–13 Slovenian PrvaLiga	Maribor	11th	2011–12
Spain	2012–13 La Liga	Barcelona	22nd	2010–11
Sweden	2013 Allsvenskan	Malmö	17th	2010
Switzerland	2012–13 Swiss Super League	Basel	16th	2011–12
Turkey	2012–13 Süper Lig	Galatasaray	19th	2011–12
Ukraine	2012–13 Ukrainian Premier League	Shakhtar Donetsk	8th	2011–12
Wales	2012–13 Welsh Premier League	The New Saints	7th	2011–12

==== Women ====
Nation	League	Champion	Title	Last honor
Belgium/ Netherlands	2012–13 BeNe League	Twente	1st (Note: This was the first season of a unified Belgium–Netherlands women's league. Twente won one title in the former Dutch top league, the Eredivisie, in 2010–11.)	—
Czech Republic	2012–13 Czech First Division	Sparta Praha	18th (Note: Includes only championships won since the dissolution of Czechoslovakia in 1993. Sparta also won 12 Czechoslovak national championships.)	2011–12
England	2013 FA WSL	Liverpool	1st	—
France	2012–13 Division 1 Féminine	Lyon	11th	2011–12
Germany	2012–13 Frauen-Bundesliga	Wolfsburg	1st	—
Norway	2013 Toppserien	Stabæk	2nd	2010
Romania	2012–13 Liga I Feminin	Olimpia Cluj	3rd	2011–12
Scotland	2013 Scottish Women's Premier League	Glasgow City	8th	2012
Slovenia	2012–13 Slovenian Women's League	Pomurje Beltinci	3	2011–12
Spain	2012–13 Primera División	FC Barcelona	2nd	2011–12
Sweden	2013 Damallsvenskan	LdB FC Malmö	7th (Note: Includes championships won under the club's former identity of FC Malmö Dam.)	2011
Wales	2012–13 Welsh Premier League	Cardiff City (Note: Not to be confused with Cardiff City Ladies F.C., another club affiliated with Cardiff City F.C. that plays in the English women's football league system.)	1st	—

=== CAF nations ===
Nation	League	Champion	Title	Last honor
Algeria	2012–13 Algerian Ligue Professionnelle 1	Sétif	6th	2011–12
Angola	2013 Girabola	Kabuscorp	1st	—
Benin	2012–13 Benin Premier League	Jeunesse Athlétique du Plateau	1st	—
Botswana	2012–13 Botswana Premier League	Mochudi Centre Chiefs	3rd	2011–12
Burkina Faso	2013 Burkinabé Premier League	ASFA Yennenga	13th	2012
Burundi	2012–13 Burundi Premier League	Flambeau de l’Est	1st	—
Cameroon	2013 MTN Elite One	Coton Sport	12th	2010–11
Cape Verde	2013 Campeonato Nacional de Cabo Verde	CS Mindelense	9th	2011
Central African Republic	2013 Central African Republic League	n/a (possibly did not hold)		
Chad	2013 Chad Premier League	Foullah Edifice FC	2nd	2011
Comoros	2013 Comoros Premier League	Komorozine de Domoni	1st	—
(Republic of the Congo) Congo	2013 Congo Premier League	AC Léopards	2nd	2012
(Democratic Republic of the Congo) Congo DR	2013 Linafoot	TP Mazembe	13th	2012
(Ivory Coast) Côte d'Ivoire	2012–13 Côte d'Ivoire Premier Division	Séwé Sport	2nd	2012
Djibouti	2012–13 Djibouti Premier League	Ali Sabieh	2nd	2008–09
Egypt	2012–13 Egyptian Premier League	n/a (season abandoned)		
Equatorial Guinea	2013 Equatoguinean Premier League	Akonangui	5th	2008
Eritrea	2013 Eritrean Premier League			
Ethiopia	2012–13 Ethiopian Premier League	Dedebit	1st	—
Gabon	2012–13 Gabon Championnat National D1	US Bitam	3rd	2009–2010
(The Gambia) Gambia	2013 GFA League First Division	Steve Biko	1st	—
Ghana	2012–13 Ghanaian Premier League	Asante Kotoko	23rd	2011–12
Guinea	2013 Guinée Championnat National	Horoya AC	12th	2011–12
Guinea-Bissau	2013 Campeonato Nacional da Guiné-Bissau	Clube de Futebol "Os Balantas"	4th	2009
Kenya	2013 Kenyan Premier League	Gor Mahia	13th	1995
Lesotho	2013 Lesotho Premier League	Lioli FC	3rd	2009
Liberia	2013 Liberian Premier League	Barrack Young Controllers	1st	—
Libya	2012–13 Libyan Premier League	n/a (possibly did not hold)		
Madagascar	2013 THB Champions League	CNaPS Sport	2nd	2010
Malawi	2012–13 Malawi Premier Division	Silver Strikers	7th	2011–12
Mali	2013 Malian Première Division	Stade Malien	18th	2011
Mauritania	2012–13 Ligue 1 Mauritania	FC Nouadhibou	4th	2010–11
Mauritius	2012–13 Mauritian League	Curepipe Starlight	4th	2008–09
Morocco	2012–13 Botola	Raja Casablanca	11th	2010–11
Mozambique	2013 Moçambola	Liga Muçulmana	3rd	2011
Namibia	2012–13 Namibia Premier League	Black Africa	8th	2011–12
Niger	2012–13 Niger Premier League	AS Douanes	1st	—
Nigeria	2013 Nigeria Premier League	Kano Pillars	3rd	2012
Réunion	2013 Réunion Premier League	US Sainte-Marienne	1st	—
Rwanda	2012–13 Primus National Football League	Rayon Sports	6th	2004
São Tomé and Príncipe	2013 São Tomé and Príncipe Championship	Sporting Praia Cruz	6th	2007
Senegal	2012–13 Senegal Premier League	ASC Diambars	1st	—
Seychelles	2013 Seychelles First Division	Côte d'Or	1st	—
Sierra Leone	2013 Sierra Leone National Premier League	Diamond Stars	2nd	2011–12
Somalia	2013 Somalia League	Elman	10th	2012
South Africa	2012–13 Premier Soccer League	Kaizer Chiefs	3rd	2004–05
Sudan	2013 Sudan Premier League	Al-Merrikh	19th	2011
(Eswatini) Swaziland	2012–13 Swazi Premier League	Mbabane Swallows	5th	2011–12
Tanzania	2012–13 Tanzanian Premier League	Young Africans	24th	2010–11
Togo	2013 Togolese Championnat National	Anges de Notsè	1st	—
Tunisia	2012–13 Tunisian Ligue Professionnelle 1	Sfaxien	8th	2004–05
Uganda	2012–13 Ugandan Super League	Kampala City Council	9th	2007–08
Zambia	2013 Zambian Premier League	Nkana	12th	2001
Zimbabwe	2013 Zimbabwe Premier Soccer League	Dynamos	21st	2012

=== OFC nations ===
Nation	League	Champion	Title	Last honor
Cook Islands	2013 Round Cup	Puaikura	1st	—
Fiji	2013 Fiji National Football League	Ba FC	19th	2012
New Caledonia	2013 New Caledonia Division Honneur	Gaïtcha FCN	2nd	1999
New Zealand	2012–13 ASB Premiership	Waitakere United	5th	2011–12
Papua New Guinea	2013 National Soccer League	Hekari United	7th	2011–12
Solomon Islands	2013 S-League	Solomon Warriors	3rd	
(French Polynesia) Tahiti	2012–13 Tahiti First Division	Dragon	2nd	2011–12
Tonga	2013 Tonga Major League	Lotoha'apai United	14th	2011–12
Vanuatu	2013 National Super League	Tafea FC	1st	—

== Domestic cups ==
=== UEFA nations ===
Nation	Tournament	Champion	Title	Last honor
Albania	2012–13 Albanian Cup	Laçi	1st	—
Andorra	2013 Copa Constitució	Santa Coloma	1st	—
Armenia	2012–13 Armenian Cup	Pyunik	5th	2010
Austria	2012–13 Austrian Cup	Pasching	1st	—
Azerbaijan	2012–13 Azerbaijan Cup	Neftchi Baku	6th	2003–04
Belarus	2012–13 Belarusian Cup	Minsk	1st	—
Belgium	2012–13 Belgian Cup	Genk	4th	2008–09
Bosnia and Herzegovina	2012–13 Bosnia and Herzegovina Football Cup	Široki Brijeg	2nd	2006–07
Bulgaria	2012–13 Bulgarian Cup	Beroe Stara Zagora	2nd	2009–10
Croatia	2012–13 Croatian Cup	Hajduk Split	6th	2009–10
Cyprus	2012–13 Cypriot Cup	Apollon Limassol	7th	2009–10
Czech Republic	2012–13 Czech Cup	Jablonec	2nd	1997–98
Denmark	2012–13 Danish Cup	Esbjerg	3rd	1975–76
England / Wales	2012–13 FA Cup	Wigan Athletic	1st	—
England / Wales	2012–13 Football League Cup	Swansea City	1st	—
England / Wales	2012–13 Football League Trophy	Crewe Alexandra	1st	—
Estonia	2012–13 Estonian Cup	Flora Tallinn	6th	2010–11
Faroe Islands	2013 Faroe Islands Cup	Víkingur	3rd	2012
Finland	2013 Finnish Cup	RoPS	2nd	1986
France	2012–13 Coupe de la Ligue	Saint-Étienne	1st	—
France	2012–13 Coupe de France	Bordeaux	4th	1986–87
(Georgia (country)) Georgia	2012–13 Georgian Cup	Dinamo Tbilisi	10th	2008–09
Germany	2012–13 DFB-Pokal	Bayern Munich	16th	2009–10
Greece	2012–13 Greek Football Cup	Olympiacos	26th	2011–12
Hungary	2012–13 Magyar Kupa	Debrecen	6th	2011–12
Iceland	2013 Icelandic Cup	Fram	8th	1989
(Republic of Ireland) Ireland / Northern Ireland	2013 FAI Cup	Sligo Rovers	5th	2011
(Republic of Ireland) Ireland / Northern Ireland	2013 League of Ireland Cup	Shamrock Rovers	2nd	1976–77
Israel	2012–13 Israel State Cup	Hapoel Ramat Gan Giv'atayim	2nd	2002–03
Italy	2012–13 Coppa Italia	Lazio	6th	2008–09
Kazakhstan	2013 Kazakhstan Cup	Shakhter Karagandy	1st	—
Latvia	2012–13 Latvian Football Cup	Ventspils	5th	2010–11
Liechtenstein	2012–13 Liechtenstein Cup	Vaduz	41st	2010–11
Lithuania	2012–13 Lithuanian Football Cup	Žalgiris	7th	2011–12
Luxembourg	2012–13 Luxembourg Cup	Jeunesse Esch	13th	1999–00
(North Macedonia) Macedonia	2012–13 Macedonian Cup	Teteks	2nd	2009–10
Malta	2012–13 Maltese FA Trophy	Hibernians	10th	2011–12
Moldova	2012–13 Moldovan Cup	Tiraspol	3rd	1999–00
Montenegro	2012–13 Montenegrin Cup	Budućnost Podgorica	1st	—
Netherlands	2012–13 KNVB Cup	AZ	4th	1981–82
Northern Ireland	2012–13 Irish Cup	Glentoran	21st	2003–04
Norway	2013 Norwegian Football Cup	Molde	3rd	2005
Poland	2012–13 Polish Cup	Legia Warsaw	16th	2011–12
Portugal	2012–13 Taça de Portugal	Vitória de Guimarães	1st	—
Romania	2012–13 Cupa României	Petrolul Ploiești	3rd	1994–95
Russia	2012–13 Russian Cup	CSKA Moscow	12th	2010–11
San Marino	2012–13 Coppa Titano	La Fiorita	3rd	2011–12
Scotland	2012–13 Scottish Cup	Celtic	36th	2010–11
Scotland	2012–13 Scottish Challenge Cup	Queen of the South	2nd	2002–03
Scotland	2012–13 Scottish League Cup	St Mirren	1st	—
Serbia	2012–13 Serbian Cup	Jagodina	1st	—
Slovakia	2012–13 Slovak Cup	Slovan Bratislava	13th	2010–11
Slovenia	2012–13 Slovenian Cup	Maribor	8th	2011–12
Slovenia	2013 Slovenian Supercup	Maribor	3rd	2012
Spain	2012–13 Copa del Rey	Atlético Madrid	10th	1995–96
Sweden	2012–13 Svenska Cupen	Göteborg	6th	2008
Switzerland	2012–13 Swiss Cup	Grasshopper Zürich	18th	1993–94
Turkey	2012–13 Turkish Cup	Fenerbahçe	6th	2011–12
Ukraine	2012–13 Ukrainian Cup	Shakhtar Donetsk	9th	2011–12
Wales	2012–13 Welsh Cup	Prestatyn Town	1st	—

=== AFC nations ===
Nation	Tournament	Champion	Title	Last honor
Bahrain	2013 Bahraini King's Cup	Al-Muharraq	31st	2012
China	2013 Chinese FA Cup	Guizhou Renhe	1st	—
Hong Kong	2012–13 Hong Kong Senior Challenge Shield	Wofoo Tai Po	1st	—
Hong Kong	2012–13 Hong Kong FA Cup	Kitchee	2nd	2011–12
India	2013–14 Indian Federation Cup	Churchill Brothers	1st	—
Indonesia	2013 Piala Indonesia	n/a (possibly did not hold)		
Iran	2012–13 Hazfi Cup	Sepahan	4th	2006–07
Japan	2013 Emperor's Cup	Yokohama F. Marinos	7th	1992
Kuwait	2013 Kuwait Emir Cup	Al Qadsia	15th	2011–12
Kuwait	2012–13 Kuwait Crown Prince Cup	Al Qadsia	7th	2009
Kuwait	2012–13 Kuwaiti Federation Cup	Al Qadsia	4th	2010–11
Lebanon	2012–13 Lebanese FA Cup	Safa SC	3rd	1985–86
Malaysia	2013 Malaysia FA Cup	Kelantan FA	2nd	2012
Malaysia	2013 Malaysia Cup	Pahang FA	3rd	1992
Maldives	2013 Maldives FA Cup	New Radiant	11th	2007
Mongolia	2013 Mongolia Cup			
Myanmar	2013 MFF Cup	n/a (cancelled)		
Oman	2012–13 Sultan Qaboos Cup	Al-Suwaiq	2nd	2008–09
Qatar	2013 Emir of Qatar Cup	Al Rayyan	6th	2011
Qatar	2012–13 Qatari Stars Cup	El Jaish	1st	—
Qatar	2013 Qatar Crown Prince Cup	Lekhwiya	1st	—
Qatar	2013 Sheikh Jassem Cup	Al Rayyan	4th	2012
Saudi Arabia	2013 King Cup of Champions	Al Ittihad	2nd	2010
Saudi Arabia	2012–13 Saudi Crown Prince Cup	Al-Hilal	18th	2011–12
Singapore	2013 Singapore Cup	Home United	6th	2011
South Korea	2013 Korean FA Cup	Pohang Steelers	4th	2012
Sri Lanka	2013 Sri Lanka FA Cup			
Syria	2013 Syrian Cup	Al-Wahda	4th	2012
Tajikistan	2013 Tajik Cup	Istiqlol Dushanbe	3rd	2010
Thailand	2013 Thai FA Cup	Buriram United	3rd	2012
United Arab Emirates	2012–13 UAE President's Cup	Al Ahli	8th	2007–08
United Arab Emirates	2012–13 Etisalat Emirates Cup	Ajman	1st	—
Uzbekistan	2013 Uzbekistan Cup	FC Bunyodkor	4th	2012
Vietnam	2013 Vietnamese Cup	Vissai Ninh Binh	1st	—
Yemen	2013 Yemeni President Cup	n/a (not played)		

=== CONCACAF nations ===
Nation	Tournament	Champion	Title	Last honor
Canada	2013 Canadian Championship	Montreal Impact	2nd (Note: Includes the 2008 title won by the current Impact's predecessor of the same name.)	2008
Costa Rica	2013 Costa Rican Cup	Deportivo Saprissa	1st	—
Mexico	Clausura 2013 Copa MX	Cruz Azul	3rd	1996–97
Mexico	Apertura 2013 Copa MX	Monarcas Morelia	1st	—
Trinidad and Tobago	2012–13 Trinidad and Tobago Cup	Caledonia AIA	3rd	2011–12
United States	2013 Lamar Hunt U.S. Open Cup	D.C. United	3rd	2008

=== CONMEBOL nations ===
==== Men ====
Nation	League	Champion	Title	Last honor
Argentina	2012–13 Copa Argentina	Arsenal de Sarandí	1st	—
Brazil	2013 Copa do Brasil	Flamengo	3rd	2006
Chile	2012–13 Copa Chile	Universidad de Chile	4th	2000
Colombia	2013 Copa Colombia	Atlético Nacional	2nd	2012
Venezuela	2013 Copa Venezuela	Caracas FC	6th	2009

==== Women ====
Nation	League	Champion	Title	Last honor
Brazil	2013 Copa do Brasil de Futebol Feminino	São José	2nd	2012

=== CAF nations ===
Nation	League	Champion	Title	Last honor
Algeria	2012–13 Algerian Cup	USM Alger	8th	2003–04
Kenya	2013 FKF President's Cup	A.F.C. Leopards	9th	2009
South Africa	2012–13 Nedbank Cup	Kaizer Chiefs	13th	2006

== Second, third, fourth, and fifth leagues ==
=== CONCACAF nations ===
Nation	League	Champion	Final score	Second place	Title	Last honour
Canada	2013 Première Ligue de soccer du Québec	CS Mont-Royal Outremont		FC St-Léonard	1st	
Canada	2013 Canadian Soccer League	SC Waterloo Region	3–1	Kingston FC	1st	

== Deaths ==
=== January ===
- 1 January – Lucio Dell'Angelo, Italian footballer (born 1938)
- 2 January – Ladislao Mazurkiewicz, Uruguayan footballer (born 1945)
- 2 January – Rudolf Szanwald, Austrian footballer (born 1931)
- 4 January – Lassaâd Ouertani, Tunisian footballer (born 1980)
- 6 January – Jon Ander López, Spanish footballer (born 1976)
- 8 January – Bernard Delcampe, French footballer (born 1932)
- 8 January – Cornel Pavlovici, Romanian footballer (born 1942)
- 12 January – Harry Fearnley, English footballer (born 1935)
- 12 January – Roy Sinclair, English footballer (born 1944)
- 13 January – Geoff Thomas, English footballer (born 1948)
- 15 January – Zurab Popkhadze, Georgian footballer (born 1972)
- 18 January – Martin Barbarič, Czech footballer (born 1970)
- 18 January – Ken Jones, English footballer (born 1936)
- 18 January – Alfons Lemmens, Dutch footballer (born 1919)
- 19 January – Ian Wells, English footballer (born 1964)
- 22 January – Jimmy Payne, English footballer (born 1926)
- 23 January – Jacques Grimonpon, French footballer (born 1925)
- 24 January – Dave Harper, English footballer (born 1938)
- 24 January – Miroslav Janů, Czech footballer (born 1959)
- 28 January – Ladislav Pavlovič, Slovak footballer (born 1926)
- 29 January – Reg Jenkins, English footballer (born 1938)

=== February ===
- 3 February – Wolfgang Abraham, German footballer (born 1942)
- 3 February – Zlatko Papec, Croatian footballer (born 1934)
- 8 February – Ron Hansell, English footballer (born 1930)
- 8 February – Kjell Hjertsson, Swedish footballer (born 1922)
- 8 February – Ian Lister, Scottish footballer (born 1946)
- 11 February – Teodor Lucuță, Romanian footballer (born 1955)
- 11 February – Alfred Zijai, Albanian footballer (born 1961)
- 12 February – Jimmy Mulroy, Irish Gaelic footballer (born 1940)
- 12 February – Frank Seator, Liberian striker (born 1975)
- 14 February – Luis Cruzado, Peruvian football midfielder (born 1941)
- 14 February – Zdeněk Zikán, Czech footballer (born 1937)
- 18 February – Okey Isima, Nigerian footballer (born 1956)
- 19 February – John Downie, Scottish footballer (born 1925)
- 20 February – Emma McDougall, English footballer (born 1991)
- 20 February – Antonio Roma, Argentine footballer (born 1932)
- 20 February – Yussef Suleiman, Syrian footballer (born 1986)
- 21 February – Nazem Ganjapour, Iranian footballer (born 1943)
- 21 February – Hasse Jeppson, English footballer (born 1925)
- 21 February – Dick Neal Jr., English footballer (born 1933)
- 24 February – Seamus O'Connell, English footballer (born 1930)
- 26 February – Dobrivoje Trivić, Serbian footballer (born 1943)
- 27 February – Terry Twell, English footballer (born 1947)
- 28 February – Theo Bos, Dutch footballer (born 1965)
- 28 February – Jean Van Steen, Belgian footballer (born 1929)

=== March ===
- March 1 – Ludwig Zausinger, German footballer (84)
- March 2 – Jimmy Jackson, Scottish footballer (81)
- March 3 – Luis Cubilla, Uruguayan footballer (72)
- March 4 – Seki Matsunaga, Japanese footballer (84)
- March 4 – George Petherbridge, English footballer (85)
- March 6 – Dave Bewley, English footballer (92)
- March 7 – Dick Graham, English footballer (91)
- March 7 – Stan Keery, English footballer (81)
- March 7 – Willie McCulloch, Scottish footballer (85)
- March 7 – Jan Zwartkruis, Dutch footballer (87)
- March 8 – Kai Pahlman, Finnish footballer (77)
- March 12 – Gordon Pembery, Welsh footballer (86)
- March 14 – Harry Thomson, Scottish footballer (72)
- March 15 – Felipe Zetter, Mexican footballer (89)
- March 17 – François Sermon, Belgian footballer (89)
- March 20 – Vasile Ianul, Romanian footballer (67)
- March 21 – Angus Carmichael, Scottish footballer (87)
- March 21 – Aníbal Paz, Uruguayan goalkeeper, winner of the 1950 FIFA World Cup. (95)
- March 22 – Fred Jones, English footballer (75)
- March 24 – Derek Leaver, English footballer (82)
- March 24 – Paolo Ponzo, Italian footballer (41)
- March 26 – Jerzy Wyrobek, Polish footballer (63)
- March 31 – Ray Drake, English footballer (78)

=== April ===
- 29 April: Kevin Moore, English footballer (born 1958)

=== May ===
- 22 May: Brian Greenhoff, English international footballer (born 1953)
- 24 May: Ron Davies, Welsh international footballer (born 1942)

=== June ===
- 15 June: Heinz Flohe, German international footballer (born 1948)
- 16 June: Ottmar Walter, German international footballer (born 1924)
- 27 June: Stefano Borgonovo, Italian international footballer (born 1964)
- 30 June: Ingvar Rydell, Swedish international footballer (born 1922)

=== July ===
- 1 July: Bent Schmidt Hansen, Danish footballer (born 1946)
- 1 July: Ján Zlocha, Slovak footballer (born 1942)
- 4 July: Jack Crompton, English footballer (born 1921)
- 8 July: Albert Dehert, Belgian footballer (born 1921)
- 8 July: Dave Hickson, English footballer (born 1929)
- 9 July: Andrzej Czyżniewski, Polish footballer (born 1953)
- 14 July: George Smith, English footballer (born 1921)
- 17 July: Luis Ubiña, Uruguayan footballer (born 1940)
- 18 July: Anatoly Budayev, Belarusian footballer (born 1969)
- 19 July: Bert Trautmann, German footballer (born 1923)
- 19 July: Phil Woosnam, Welsh footballer (born 1932)
- 20 July: André Grobéty, Swiss footballer (born 1933)
- 22 July: Lawrie Reilly, Scottish international footballer (born 1928)
- 23 July: Djalma Santos, Brazilian international footballer (born 1929)
- 27 July: Sékou Camara, Malian footballer (born 1985)
- 29 July: Christian Benítez, Ecuadorian international footballer (born 1986)
- 30 July: Antoni Ramallets, Spanish footballer (born 1924)

=== August ===
- 1 August: Collin McAdam, Scottish footballer (born 1951)
- 1 August: Ritham Madubun, Indonesian footballer (born 1971)
- 2 August: Kurt Ehrmann, German international footballer (born 1922)
- 3 August: Jack Hynes, Scottish footballer (born 1920)
- 4 August: Wilf Carter, English footballer (born 1933)
- 5 August: Malcolm Barrass, English footballer (born 1924)
- 6 August: Steve Aizlewood, Welsh footballer (born 1952)
- 6 August: Dave Wagstaffe, English footballer (born 1943)
- 6 August: Selçuk Yula, Turkish footballer (born 1959)
- 7 August: Keith Skillen, English footballer (born 1948)
- 8 August: Chikondi Banda Malawian footballer (born 1979)
- 8 August: Johnny Hamilton, Scottish footballer (born 1935)
- 11 August: Bob Bignall, Australian footballer (born 1922)
- 13 August: Alfonso Lara, Chilean footballer (born 1946)
- 13 August: Jean Vincent, French footballer (born 1930)
- 16 August: John Ryden, Scottish footballer (born 1931)
- 16 August: Francesco Scaratti, Italian footballer (born 1939)
- 19 August: Reha Eken, Turkish footballer (born 1925)
- 20 August: Costică Ștefănescu, Romanian footballer (born 1951)
- 20 August: Fred Martin, Scottish footballer (born 1929)
- 22 August: Andrea Servi, Italian footballer (born 1984)
- 24 August: Newton de Sordi, Brazilian international footballer (born 1931)
- 25 August: Gylmar dos Santos Neves, Brazilian international footballer (born 1930)
- 27 August: Zoltán Kovács, Hungarian footballer (born 1986)
- 27 August: Héctor Sanabria, Argentine footballer (born 1985)
- 28 August: László Gyetvai, Hungarian footballer (born 1918)
- 28 August: Francis Kajiya, Zambian footballer (born 1954)
- 28 August: Barry Stobart, English footballer (born 1938)
- 29 August: Artan Bushati, Albanian football coach (born 1963)

=== September ===
- 1 September: Pál Csernai, Hungarian footballer and international coach (born 1932)
- 1 September: Ignacio Eizaguirre, Spanish international footballer (born 1920)
- 4 September: Ferdinand Biwersi, German referee (born 1934)
- 7 September: Wolfgang Frank, German footballer and manager (born 1951)
- 7 September: Marek Špilár, Slovak international footballer (born 1975)
- 11 September: Fernand Boone, Belgian international footballer (born 1934)
- 19 September: Gerrie Mühren, Dutch international footballer (born 1946)
- 23 September: Vlatko Marković, Yugoslav international footballer (born 1937)

=== October ===
- 1 October: Peter Broadbent, English international footballer (born 1933)
- 14 October: Bruno Metsu, French footballer (born 1954)

=== November ===
- 3 November: Ryszard Kraus Polish international footballer (born 1964)
- 5 November: Stuart Williams Welsh international footballer (born 1930)
- 12 November: Erik Dyreborg, Danish footballer (born 1940)
- 14 November: Bennett Masinga, South African international footballer (born 1965)
- 16 November: Arne Pedersen, Norwegian international footballer (born 1931)
- 24 November: Amedeo Amadei, Italian international footballer and manager (born 1921)
- 25 November: Bill Foulkes, English international footballer and manager (born 1932)
- 27 November: Nílton Santos, Brazilian international footballer (born 1925)

=== December ===
- 2 December: Pedro Rocha, Uruguayan international footballer (born 1942)
- 18 December: Büyük Jeddikar, Iranian international footballer (born 1929)
- 24 December: Serghei Stroenco, Moldovan international footballer (born 1967)
- 29 December: Ilya Tsymbalar, Ukrainian and Russian international footballer (born 1969)
- 30 December: Akeem Adams, Trinidadian international footballer (born 1991)
