= 2011 Saint Lucia Gold Division =

Saint Lucia Gold Division
- Season: 2011
- Champions: VSADC
- Top goalscorer: (Saint Lucia) Andres Canavharo (11 goals)

The 2011 Saint Lucia Gold Division in association football is the 31st season of the highest division of Saint Lucian football.

VSADC won the title.

== Teams ==
Club	Home city	Home ground
Big Players FC	Marchand	
Challengers FC	Soufrière	
Lancers FC	Castries	
Northern United All Stars	Gros Islet	
Pakis FC	Micoud	
Rovers United FC	Castries	
Square United	Vieux Fort	
VSADC	Castries	

== Table ==
=== First stage ===
Pos	Team	Pld	W	D	L	GF	GA	GD	Pts	Qualification or relegation
1	VSADC	6	4	0	2	14	10	+4	12	Second Stage
2	Square United	6	3	1	2	10	9	+1	10	Second Stage
3	Northern United All Stars	6	2	2	2	12	12	0	8	Second Stage
4	Challengers	6	2	2	2	8	8	0	8	Second Stage
5	Big Players	5	2	1	2	11	7	+4	7	
6	Rovers United	5	2	1	2	9	8	+1	7	
7	Lancers FC	6	2	1	3	9	12	−3	7	Relegation to 2012 Silver Division
8	Pakis FC	6	2	0	4	7	14	−7	6	Relegation to 2012 Silver Division

Rules for classification: 1) points; 2) goal difference; 3) number of goals scored.

=== Second Stage ===
Following the regular stage, the top four clubs competed in a two-legged playoff series to determine the league champion. Villa Clara won the tournament and thus the 2010–11 season.

Semifinals

Final

2011 Gold Division champion
TBD
TBD title

== Match results ==
=== Round 1 ===
19 June

Team 1	Score	Team 2
Northern United All Stars	1–1	Lancers FC
Pakis FC	1–2	Challengers FC
VSADC	3–1	Square United
Big Players FC	ppd.	Rovers United

=== Round 2 ===
25 June

Rovers United 2-2 Challengers FC Square United 0-1 Pakis FC Northern United 0-2 VSADC Lancers FC 2-0 Big Players FC

=== Round 3 ===
3 July

Rovers United 2-1 Pakis FC Square United 5-3 Northern United All Stars Challengers FC 2-1 Lancers FC VSADC 2-4 Big Players FC

=== Round 4 ===
9 July

Northern United All Stars 5-2 Pakis FC VSADC 2-1 Challengers

10 July

Big Players FC 1-1 Square United Lancers FC 3-2 Rovers United

=== Round 5 ===
16 July

Rovers United 2-0 VSADC Challengers FC 0-1 Square United Pakis FC 2-0 Lancers FC Northern United All Stars 2-1 Big Players FC

=== Round 6 ===
23 July

Square United - Rovers United

24 July

Big Players FC - Pakis FC VSADC - Lancers FC Challengers FC - Northern United All Stars
