= 2016 SLFA First Division =

SLFA First Division
- Season: 2016
- Champions: Survivals
- 2018 CFU Club Championship: Survivals; Big Players
- Biggest home win: Platinum 3–0 RV Juniors (8 Dec 2016)
- All statistics correct as of 29 April 2017.

The 2016 SLFA First Division was the 38th season of top-division association football in Saint Lucia. The SLFA First Division season began on 22 October 2016, and concluded on 8 December 2016.

Only partial information has been reported from the Saint Lucia Football Association, but from what was reported, Survivals FC won the league title, accumulating the most points after seven league matches. This gave the club their first Lucian league title.

== Teams ==
A total of eight clubs participated during the 2016 campaign. Apparently, these teams qualified to play in the reformed league through their performances in the 2015 SLFA President's Cup.

Team	Home city	Home ground
Big Players	Castries	Marchand Grounds
Ciceron Seagulls	Castries	Ciceron Secondary School Field
Northern United All Stars	Gros Islet	Gros Islet Cricket Oval
Platinum	Vieux Fort	George Odlum Stadium
R.V. Juniors	Anse la Raye	
Rovers United	Castries	Mindoo Phillip Park
Survivals	Mabouya Valley	Richfond Field
Young Roots	Soufrière	Soufrière Mini-Stadium

== Table ==
Top three:

1. Survivals FC
2. Big Players FC
3. Northern United All Stars

It is unknown who finished 4th through 8th during the season.
