= 2019 SLFA First Division =

SLFA First Division
- Season: 2019
- Champions: Platinum
- Caribbean Club Shield: Platinum
- Top goalscorer: (Saint Lucia) Delon Neptune (Saint Lucia) Shaquille (9 goals each)

The 2019 SLFA First Division was the 41st season of the SLFA First Division, the top-tier football in Saint Lucia. The season started on 17 February and concluded on 28 April 2019. The main venue for the league was the 1,000-capacity Philip Marcellin Grounds. Platinum FC were crowned national champions.

== League table ==
Pos	Team	Pld	W	D	L	GF	GA	GD	Pts	Qualification or relegation
1	Platinum (C)	9	7	2	0	24	4	+20	23	Caribbean Club Shield
2	Uptown Rebels	9	7	2	0	16	3	+13	23	
3	VSADC	9	6	0	3	15	9	+6	18	
4	Northern United	9	4	2	3	12	6	+6	14	
5	Ti Rocher	9	4	1	4	10	17	−7	13	
6	SLSO Monchy United	9	3	2	4	13	14	−1	11	
7	Big Players	9	2	3	4	12	16	−4	9	
8	El Niños	9	1	3	5	9	14	−5	6	
9	Knights (R)	9	1	2	6	8	18	−10	5	Relegated to SLFA Second Division
10	T-Valley (R)	9	1	1	7	8	26	−18	4	Relegated to SLFA Second Division

Source: SLFA
(C) Champions; (R) Relegated

== Stadiums ==
Team	Location	Stadium	Capacity
Platinum FC	Vieux Fort	Philip Marcellin Grounds	1,000
Uptown Rebels SC	Vieux Fort	Philip Marcellin Grounds	1,000
Vempers Sports Athletic Dramatic Club			
Northern United All Stars	Gros Islet	Gros Islet Cricket Oval	200
TI Rocher			
SLSO Monchy United			
Big Players FC	Marchand	Marchand Grounds	1,000
El Niños FC			
Knights SC			
T-Valley FC			

== Top scorers ==
Rank	Player	Club	Goals
1	(Saint Lucia) Delon Neptune	Platinum FC	9
1	(Saint Lucia) Shaquille	VSADC	9
3	(Saint Lucia) Antonius Myers	Platinum FC	8
4	(Saint Lucia) Antonio Joseph	Uptown Rebels SC	7
5	(Saint Lucia) Aramis Gilbert	Monchy United	6
6	(Saint Lucia) Javick McFarlane	Uptown Rebels SC	4
6	(Saint Lucia) Lincoln Phillip	Big Players FC	4
8	(Saint Lucia) Valdez Maximin	Big Players FC	3
8	(Saint Lucia) Doneal Lionel	T-Valley	3
8	(Saint Lucia) Baggio Lewis	VSADC	3

== See also ==
- 2019 Blackheart/Kashif & Shanghai International Football Tournament, played from 14 September to 5 October 2019
- 2019 SLFA Island Cup, played from 2 July to 21 December 2019
- 2019 SLFA Second Division
- 2019 Babonneau Football League
- 2019 Mabouya Valley Football League
- 2019 Marchand Football League
