= 2018 SLFA First Division =

SLFA First Division
- Season: 2018
- Champions: Platinum FC
- Caribbean Club Shield: Platinum FC
- Top goalscorer: (Dominica) Randolph Peltier (7 goals)

The 2018 SLFA First Division is the 40th season of top-division football league in Saint Lucia. The season began on 11 February 2018 and ended on 14 March 2018.

== Final standings ==
Pos	Team	Pld	W	D	L	GF	GA	GD	Pts	Qualification or relegation
1	Platinum FC	7	4	3	0	18	3	+15	15	Champions
2	VSADC	7	4	3	0	13	9	+4	15	
3	Ti Rocher	7	2	4	1	15	11	+4	10	
4	Uptown Rebels	7	2	4	1	6	3	+3	10	
5	Big Players FC	7	3	1	3	11	13	−2	10	
6	Northern United	7	2	2	3	10	11	−1	8	
7	Allez	7	0	4	3	9	15	−6	4	Relegation to lower division
8	RV Juniors	7	0	1	6	6	23	−17	1	Relegation to lower division

Source: rsssf.com

== Top scorers ==
Rank	Player	Club	Goals
1	(Dominica) Randolph Peltier	Northern United	7
2	(Saint Lucia) Lincoln Phillip	Big Players FC	6
3	(Saint Lucia) Delon Neptune	Platinum FC	5
4	(Saint Lucia) Alvin Williams	VSADC	4
4	(Saint Lucia) Javaid Joseph	Platinum FC	4
4	(Saint Lucia) Verneil Mohtoute	Allez	4
7	(Saint Lucia) Gregson	Platinum FC	3
7	(Saint Lucia) Andre Joseph	Ti Rocher FC	3
7	(Saint Lucia) Rai Gaspard	Ti Rocher FC	3
7	(Saint Lucia) Nicky Henry	RV Juniors	3
