= Saint Lucia national football team =

Saint Lucia
- Association: Saint Lucia Football Association (SLFA)
- Confederation: CONCACAF (North America)
- Sub-confederation: CFU (Caribbean)
- Head coach: Rajesh Latchoo
- Captain: Kurt Frederick
- Most caps: Kurt Frederick (75)
- Top scorer: Earl Jean (20)
- Home stadium: George Odlum Stadium
- FIFA code: LCA
First colours	Second colours

FIFA ranking
- Current: 163 ▲2 (18 November 2026)
- Highest: 108 (April 2003)
- Lowest: 192 (March 2010)

First international
- Dominica 4–1 Saint Lucia (Dominica; 9 January 1938)

Biggest win
- Saint Lucia 14–1 U.S. Virgin Islands (Port-au-Prince, Haiti; 14 April 2001)

Biggest defeat
- Saint Vincent and the Grenadines 8–0 Saint Lucia (Kingston, Jamaica; 1 October 2006)

CONCACAF Gold Cup
- Appearances: 1 (first in 2027)
- Best result: TBD
Medal record
Caribbean Cup
Bronze medal – third place	1991 Jamaica	Team

The Saint Lucia national football team, officially designated as St Lucia by FIFA, represents Saint Lucia in men's international football, and is governed by the Saint Lucia Football Association, the governing body for football in Saint Lucia founded in 1979. It has been a full member of FIFA since 1988, a full member of CONCACAF since 1986, and is also a member of CFU in the Caribbean Zone.

St Lucia has never qualified for the FIFA World Cup though they have qualified for the 2027 CONCACAF Gold Cup. They have also participated four times in League B and once in League C of the CONCACAF Nations League. In subcontinental competitions, the team finished as third place in the 1991 Caribbean Cup.

== History ==
The team attempted to qualify to the World Cup finals tournament for the first time during the 1994 World Cup qualification, when they were eliminated in the first qualification round by Saint Vincent and the Grenadines in 1992.

In the CONCACAF 2014 FIFA World Cup qualification Saint Lucia played Aruba in the first qualifying round – losing the first leg 4–2 in Aruba. The return leg in Saint Lucia ended in a 4–2 victory after 90 minutes, sending the tie into extra time, and then to penalty kicks. Saint Lucia won the shoot-out 5–4 and advanced to the main draw for the 2014 FIFA World Cup. Saint Lucia were then grouped with Canada, Saint Kitts and Nevis, and Puerto Rico in Group D of the second qualifying round. Saint Lucia were eliminated from World Cup qualification after finishing last in their group with one point as a result of one draw and five losses. In 2014 the team won the Windward Islands Tournament after beating Dominica 2–0, Grenada 1–0 and a tie with Saint Vincent & The Grenadines.

The Saint Lucia FA established a partnership with England's Carlisle United which saw four Saint Lucians trial at the club each year from 2012 in exchange for Carlisle getting right of first refusal for the players' professional rights.

FIFA announced that Saint Lucia withdrew from the 2022 FIFA World Cup qualification before their first match, after they were initially drawn into Group E in the first round.

In 2026, they would qualify for their first-ever Gold Cup after winning Group B of that year's Nations League.

== Results and fixtures ==
The following is a list of match results in the last 12 months, as well as any future matches that have been scheduled.

Win Draw Loss Fixture

=== 2025 ===
12 November 2025–26 CONCACAF Series	Cuba	3–0	Saint Lucia	Santiago, Dominican Republic
17:00 UTC−4	Torres 38'; Matos 45+1'; Reyes 53'	Report		Stadium: Estadio Cibao FC

15 November 2025–26 CONCACAF Series	Saint Vincent and the Grenadines	3–1	Saint Lucia	Santiago, Dominican Republic
20:00 UTC−4	Anderson 12'; Spring 13'; Solomon 62'		Elva 45'	Stadium: Estadio Cibao FC

=== 2026 ===
27 March 2026 FIFA Series	Azerbaijan	6–1	Saint Lucia	Sumgayit, Azerbaijan
19:10 UTC+4	Mahmudov 2' (pen.); Sadıxov 21'; Qurbanlı 37'; T. Bayramov 64'; Isgandarli 86'; R. Akhmedzade 89'	Report	Phillip 52' (pen.)	Stadium: Sumgayit City Stadium; Referee: Giorgi Kruashvili (Georgia)

25 September 2026–27 CONCACAF Nations League	Barbados	2–0	Saint Lucia	Gros Islet, Saint Lucia
20:00 UTC−4	Gale 9' (pen.); Reid-Stephen 73'	Report		Stadium: Daren Sammy Cricket Ground; Attendance: 774; Referee: Deily Gómez (Costa Rica)

28 September 2026–27 CONCACAF Nations League	Saint Lucia	5–2	Bermuda	Gros Islet, Saint Lucia
20:00 UTC−4	Caull 15', 18', 35'; Byron 53'; Frederick 68'	Report	Burchall 45+1'; Robinson 70'	Stadium: Daren Sammy Cricket Ground; Attendance: 897; Referee: Brayan Cruz (Costa Rica)

2 October 2026–27 CONCACAF Nations League	Saint Lucia	3–0	Guadeloupe	Wildey, Barbados
15:00 UTC−4	Elva 18' (pen.); Jude-Boyd 35'; Phillip 57'	Report		Stadium: Wildey Turf; Attendance: 36; Referee: Adrián Lage (Cuba)

5 October 2026–27 CONCACAF Nations League	Guadeloupe	0–1	Saint Lucia	Wildey, Barbados
15:00 UTC−4		Report	Caull 5'	Stadium: Wildey Turf; Referee: Shekiel Jokil (Suriname)

13 November 2026–27 CONCACAF Nations League	Bermuda	1-2	Saint Lucia	Le Gosier, Guadeloupe
15:00 UTC−4	Tucker 6', 54'	Report	Byron 20'	Stadium: Stade Roger Zami

17 November 2026–27 CONCACAF Nations League	Saint Lucia	2-0	Barbados	Le Gosier, Guadeloupe
15:00 UTC−4	Byron 20' St. Romain 87'	Report		Stadium: Stade Roger Zami

== Coaching history ==
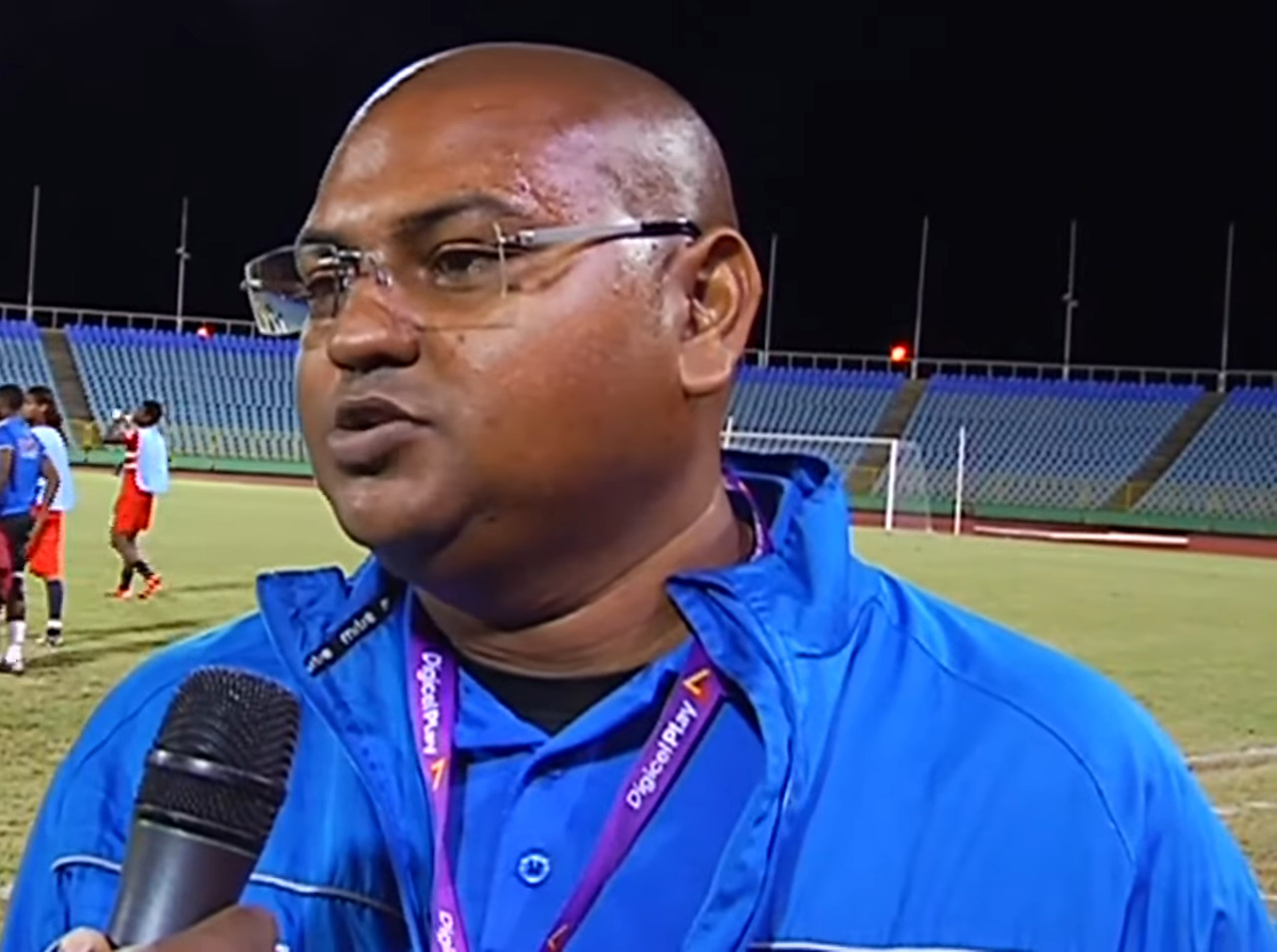
Rajesh Latchoo is the current head coach of the Saint Lucia national football team

- (Saint Lucia) Kingsley Armstrong (1996)
- (Saint Lucia) Cassim Louis (1999–00)
- (Saint Lucia) Kingsley Armstrong (2002–04)
- (Saint Lucia) Carson Millar (2004–06)
- (Saint Lucia) Terrence Caroo (2006–10)
- (Saint Lucia) Alain Providence (2010–11)
- (Saint Lucia) Francis Lastic (2012–2018)
- (Saint Lucia) Francis McDonald (2018–2019)
- (Trinidad and Tobago) Jamaal Shabazz (2019–2021)
- (Trinidad and Tobago) Stern John (2022–2026)
- (Trinidad and Tobago) Rajesh Latchoo (2026–present)

== Players ==
=== Current squad ===
The following players were called up for the 2026 FIFA Series match against Azerbaijan on 27 March 2026.

Caps and goals correct as of 15 November 2025, after the match against Saint Vincent and the Grenadines.

No.	Pos.	Player	Date of birth (age)	Caps	Goals	Club
1	GK	Devone St. Prix	1 September 1997 (age 29)	0	0	(Saint Lucia Football Association) La Clery
2	GK	Darren Donaie	5 May 2003 (age 23)	1	0	(Jamaica Football Federation) Molynes United
3	GK	A'dee Germe	28 January 2008 (age 18)	0	0	(Saint Lucia Football Association) Uptown Rebels
4	DF	Ajani Louis		0	0	(Saint Lucia Football Association) Choiseul
5	DF	Melvin Doxilly	2 January 1998 (age 28)	42	0	(Jamaica Football Federation) Mount Pleasant
6	DF	Alvinus Myers	3 June 1996 (age 30)	41	0	(Jamaica Football Federation) Spanish Town Police
7	DF	Doneal Lionel	30 July 1998 (age 28)	0	0	(Saint Lucia Football Association) La Clery
8	DF	Ridel Stanislas	7 September 1997 (age 29)	25	3	(Antigua and Barbuda Football Association) Grenades
9	MF	Shaquan Nelson	11 May 2004 (age 22)	9	0	(Royal Spanish Football Federation) Villena CF
10	MF	Thierry Morille	30 August 2008 (age 18)	0	0	(Saint Lucia Football Association) Northern United
11	MF	Lester Joseph	23 February 1993 (age 33)	41	1	(Antigua and Barbuda Football Association) Grenades
12	MF	Trent Alexander	16 August 2001 (age 25)	3	0	(Saint Lucia Football Association) Square United Vieux Fort
13	MF	Bayan Aman	1 July 2005 (age 21)	6	0	(Football Association of Bosnia and Herzegovina) Velež Nevesinje
14	MF	Mervin St. Romain	26 December 2005 (age 20)	2	0	(Saint Lucia Football Association) La Clery
15	MF	Eymani Butcher	25 December 2007 (age 18)	3	0	(Saint Lucia Football Association) Black Panthers
16	FW	Donavan Phillip	4 January 2005 (age 21)	0	0	(United States Soccer Federation) Colorado Rapids
17	FW	Hemaiael Charlery	5 October 2004 (age 22)	4	0	(Saint Lucia Football Association) Roseau Valley
18	FW	Shevon Byron	27 April 2008 (age 18)	0	0	(Jamaica Football Federation) Mount Pleasant Academy
19	FW	Arkell Jude-Boyd	22 January 2003 (age 23)	6	1	(The Football Association) Shrewsbury Town
20	FW	Kegan Caull	20 March 2004 (age 22)	4	0	(The Football Association) Basildon United
21	FW	Jahlil Evans	3 September 2004 (age 22)	0	0	(Saint Lucia Football Association) Cimpex

=== Recent call-ups ===
The following players have also been called up to the Saint Lucia squad within the last twelve months.

Pos.	Player	Date of birth (age)	Caps	Goals	Club	Latest call-up
GK	Vino Barclett	12 October 1999 (age 27)	39	0	(Jamaica) Cavalier	v. Saint Vincent and the Grenadines; 15 November 2025
GK	Lamar Joseph-Johnson	4 November 1991 (age 35)	2	0	(England) Welwyn Garden City	v. Saint Vincent and the Grenadines; 15 November 2025
GK	Anton Richard	7 November 1997 (age 29)	0	0	(Saint Lucia) White House Dennery	v. Saint Vincent and the Grenadines; 15 November 2025
DF	Kurt Frederick	27 April 1991 (age 35)	69	12	(Trinidad and Tobago) Morvant Caledonia United	v. Saint Vincent and the Grenadines; 15 November 2025
DF	Josh Solomon-Davies	20 November 1999 (age 26)	14	0	(England) Vauxhall Motors	v. Saint Vincent and the Grenadines; 15 November 2025
DF	Malik Louis	21 December 2008 (age 17)	1	0	(Saint Lucia) Northern United	v. Saint Vincent and the Grenadines; 15 November 2025
MF	Gregson President	30 January 1996 (age 30)	18	3	(Jamaica) Montego Bay United	v. Saint Vincent and the Grenadines; 15 November 2025
MF	Brandon Sandiford	20 September 2003 (age 23)	8	0	(Saint Lucia) Mabouya Valley	v. Saint Vincent and the Grenadines; 15 November 2025
MF	Dervaj Edward	27 September 2008 (age 18)	0	0	Unknown	v. Saint Vincent and the Grenadines; 15 November 2025
MF	Elijah Joseph	17 November 2005 (age 21)	0	0	(Saint Lucia) White House Dennery	v. Saint Vincent and the Grenadines; 15 November 2025
FW	Aaron Richard	14 July 2005 (age 21)	18	1	(Saint Lucia) Monchy United	v. Saint Vincent and the Grenadines; 15 November 2025
FW	Caniggia Elva	14 July 1996 (age 30)	16	8	(Canada) Cavalry FC	v. Saint Vincent and the Grenadines; 15 November 2025
FW	Donavan Jn. Baptiste	27 June 1996 (age 30)	14	2	(Saint Lucia) El Niño's	v. Saint Vincent and the Grenadines; 15 November 2025
FW	Saviola Elva	19 June 2002 (age 24)	3	1	(Saint Lucia) Platinum FC	v. Saint Vincent and the Grenadines; 15 November 2025

== Player records ==
As of 15 November 2025
Players in bold are still active with Saint Lucia.

=== Most appearances ===
Rank	Player	Caps	Goals	Career
1	**Kurt Frederick**	69	12	2010–present
2	**Melvin Doxilly**	42	0	2017–present
3	**Lester Joseph**	41	1	2014–present
3	**Alvinus Myers**	41	0	2017–present
5	Pernal Williams	39	3	2010–2019
5	**Vino Barclett**	39	0	2017–present
7	Sheldon Emmanuel	34	4	2002–2015
8	Titus Elva	27	16	1995–2008
8	Tremain Paul	27	4	2011–2019
8	Malik St. Prix	27	2	2014–2023

=== Top goalscorers ===
Rank	Player	Goals	Caps	Ratio	Career
1	Earl Jean	20	23	0.87	1990–2004
2	Titus Elva	16	27	0.59	1995–2008
3	**Kurt Frederick**	12	69	0.17	2010–present
4	**Caniggia Elva**	8	16	0.5	2023–present
4	Emerson Sheldon Mark	8	22	0.36	1999–2008
6	Jean-Marie Emerson	7	7	1	1999–2002
6	Elijah Joseph	7	22	0.32	1996–2012
6	Cliff Valcin	7	23	0.3	2010–2014
9	Levi Gilbert	6	10	0.6	2004–2008
9	Jamil Joseph	6	23	0.26	2010–2015

== Competitive record ==
=== FIFA World Cup ===
FIFA World Cup record									Qualification record					
Year	Round	Position	Pld	W	D*	L	GF	GA	Pld	W	D	L	GF	GA
1930 to 1978	Part of United Kingdom								Part of United Kingdom					
1982 to 1990	Not a FIFA member								Not a FIFA member					
(United States) 1994	Did not qualify								2	1	0	1	2	3
(France) 1998	Did not qualify								2	0	0	2	1	6
(South Korea) (Japan) 2002	Did not qualify								2	1	0	1	1	1
(Germany) 2006	Did not qualify								4	2	0	2	10	7
(South Africa) 2010	Did not qualify								4	1	0	3	4	11
(Brazil) 2014	Did not qualify								8	1	1	6	10	29
(Russia) 2018	Did not qualify								2	1	0	1	4	5
(Qatar) 2022	Withdrew								Withdrew					
(Canada) (Mexico) (United States) 2026	Did not qualify								4	1	1	2	5	9
(Morocco) (Portugal) (Spain) 2030	To be determined								To be determined					
(Saudi Arabia) 2034	To be determined								To be determined					
Total: 0/9									28	8	2	18	37	71

=== CONCACAF Gold Cup ===
CONCACAF Gold Cup record
Year	Round	Position	Pld	W	D*	L	GF	GA
(United States) 1991	Did not qualify							
(Mexico) (United States) 1993	Did not qualify							
(United States) 1996	Did not qualify							
(United States) 1998	Did not qualify							
(United States) 2000	Did not qualify							
(United States) 2002	Did not qualify							
(Mexico) (United States) 2003	Did not qualify							
(United States) 2005	Did not qualify							
(United States) 2007	Did not qualify							
(United States) 2009	Did not enter							
(United States) 2011	Did not qualify							
(United States) 2013	Did not qualify							
(Canada) (United States) 2015	Did not qualify							
(United States) 2017	Did not qualify							
(Costa Rica) (Jamaica) (United States) 2019	Did not qualify							
(United States) 2021	Did not qualify							
(Canada) (United States) 2023	Did not qualify							
(Canada) (United States) 2025	Did not qualify							
2027	Qualified							
Total: 1/19								

=== CONCACAF Nations League ===
CONCACAF Nations League record
League											Finals								
Season	Division	Group	Pld	W	D	L	GF	GA	P/R		Finals	Result	Pld	W	D	L	GF	GA	Squad
2019–20	B	B	6	1	1	4	2	10	▼		(United States) 2021	Ineligible							
2022–23	C	C	4	4	0	0	8	2	▲		(United States) 2023	Ineligible							
2023–24	B	A	6	3	1	2	10	6	Same position		(United States) 2024	Ineligible							
2024–25	B	B	6	3	0	3	7	15	Same position		(United States) 2025	Ineligible							
2026–27	B	B	6	5	0	1	13	5	▲		(United States) 2027	Ineligible							
Total	—	—	28	16	2	10	40	38	—	Total	0 Titles	—	—	—	—	—	—	—	—

=== Caribbean Cup ===
Caribbean Cup record
Year	Round	Position	Pld	W	D*	L	GF	GA
(Barbados) 1989	Did not qualify							
(Trinidad and Tobago) 1990	Did not qualify							
(Jamaica) 1991	Third place	3rd	7	4	2	1	15	4
(Trinidad and Tobago) 1992	Did not qualify							
(Jamaica) 1993	Group stage	8th	3	0	1	2	3	7
(Trinidad and Tobago) 1994	Did not enter							
(Cayman Islands) (Jamaica) 1995	Group stage	8th	3	0	0	3	1	9
(Trinidad and Tobago) 1996	Did not qualify							
(Antigua and Barbuda) (Saint Kitts and Nevis) 1997	Did not qualify							
(Jamaica) (Trinidad and Tobago) 1998	Did not qualify							
(Trinidad and Tobago) 1999	Did not qualify							
(Trinidad and Tobago) 2001	Did not qualify							
(Barbados) 2005	Did not qualify							
(Trinidad and Tobago) 2007	Did not qualify							
(Jamaica) 2008	Withdrew							
(Martinique) 2010	Did not qualify							
(Antigua and Barbuda) 2012	Did not qualify							
(Jamaica) 2014	Did not qualify							
(Martinique) 2017	Did not enter							
Total: 3/19	Third place	3rd	13	4	3	6	19	20

== Honours ==
=== Subcontinental ===
- Caribbean Cup
  - (bronze) Third place (1): 1991

=== Friendly ===
- Windward Islands Tournament (4): 1964–65, 1972, 1984, 2014
