= List of football clubs in Saint Lucia =

This is a list of football (soccer) clubs in Saint Lucia.

- 1987 All Stars SCC
- Aux Lyons United (Mabouya Valley)
- B1 FC (Castries)
- BAYS FC
- Big Players FC (Marchand, Castries)
- Black Panthers SC (Soufriere)
- Ciceron Seagulls (Castries)
- Dames SC|Dames (Vieux Fort)
- Diamond Ballers FC
- Elite Challengers (Soufrière)
- El Ninos FC
- GMC United (Gros Islet)
- GSYO (Soufrière)
- Knights SC
- Monchy United FC (Gros Islet)
- Northern United All Stars (Gros Islet)
- NYAH (Central Castries)
- New Generation FC (Babonneau)
- Pakis (Micoud)
- Pioneers F (Central Castries)
- Piton Travel Young Stars SC
- Platinum FC (Vieux Fort)
- Roots Alley Ballers (Vieux Fort)
- Roseau Valley
- Rovers United (Mabouya Valley)
- R.V. Juniors
- Ti Rocher FC
- Togetherness Youth SSC
- Uptown Rebels (Vieux Fort)
- VSADC (Central Castries)
- Lancers FC (Central Castries)
- Victory Eagles S.C.(Vieux Fort)

2022 SLFA Division One Tournament 2022 SLFA Division Two Tournament
