= Kegan Caull =

Saint Lucian footballer

Personal information
- Full name: Kegan Montgomery Caull
- Date of birth: 20 March 2004 (age 22)
- Place of birth: Vieux Fort, Saint Lucia
- Position: Forward

Team information
- Current team: Montego Bay United

Youth career
- 2017–2021: VSADC

Senior career*
Years	Team	Apps	(Gls)
2020–2021	Saint Lucia U20	20	(34)
2022–2023	Europa Point	10	(5)
2022	→ VSADC (loan)	7	(9)
2023	NK Tolmin	10	(5)
2023–2024	Europa Point	17	(1)
2025	Villena CF	10	(6)
2025	Hashtag United	6	(0)
2025–2026	Basildon United	7	(2)
2026–	Montego Bay United	7	(2)

International career^{‡}
2019	Saint Lucia U15	9	(9)
2021	Saint Lucia U20	4	(5)
2022–	Saint Lucia	8	(4)
- * Club domestic league appearances and goals as of 13:32, 6 October 2026 (UTC) ‡ National team caps and goals as of 13:32, 6 October 2026 (UTC)

Kegan Montgomery Caull (born 20 March 2004) is a Saint Lucian footballer who plays as a forward for Jamaica Premier League club Montego Bay United and the Saint Lucia national team.

== Youth career ==
Caull had played for VSADC since at least the under-15 level in 2017. In 2018 his goal against the U17 team of FC Pioneers propelled VSADC into the league final. He was named the top junior male footballer by the Saint Lucia Football Association in 2019. That year he scored two goals against New Generation FC in the U18 League Grand-Final. VSADC were crowned league champions following the 3–1 victory. Caull also won the Golden Boot award for his age division that season. He was named SLFA Junior Male Footballer of the Year again for a second straight year in 2020 after he was named MVP of his club and the U15 and U17 leagues. He also lead his club to the Northern Zone U17 Championship and was named best midfielder of the U17 league and ECFH Tournament hosted by the Castries Football Council.

== Club career ==
For the 2020 and 2021 seasons, Caull played for the U20 national team in the Saint Lucia Second Division. In January 2022 he left SLFA First Division club VSADC for what was to be a one-week trial with Europa Point of the Gibraltar National League before moving on to CD International Logrono in Spain for three months. However, after settling in at Logrono, the player officially joined Europa Point the following month. He scored on his league debut for the club on 26 April 2022 against College 1975. Following the 2021–22 Saint Lucia Super League Cup, Caull finished with eight goals in just six matches for the U20 national team, one goal behind the golden boot winner, despite missing the majority of the season playing in Europe.

During the summer off-season in Europe, Caull returned to VSADC for the 2022 SLFA First Division season. With two matchdays remaining in the season, he was the league's leading scorer with nine goals. In July 2022 it was announced that Caull had re-signed with Europa Point for the 2022–23 season.

On 15 February 2023 Caull joined NK Tolmin of the Slovenian 3. SNL – West.

== International career ==
Caull was named to Saint Lucia's under-15 team for the 2018 CFU Boys U14 Challenge Series. He scored in his team's 8–0 opening-match victory over Turks and Caicos. He finished the tournament tied for second in scoring with five goals. He was re-called to the team for the 2019 CONCACAF Boys' Under-15 Championship. He scored the game-winning goal in a 7–0 victory over Sint Maarten in a warm-up friendly prior to the championship. In the tournament, he scored three goals in four matches including one against French Guiana and Belize. Saint Lucia defeated Puerto Rico 3–1 in the final to become champions of Division 2. Following the competition Caull was named to the Best XI of the division.

In November 2021 Caull was part of Saint Lucia's squad for 2021 CONCACAF U-20 Championship qualifying. In his country's opening match, he scored a hattrick in a 5–2 victory over Saint Martin. He went on to score a brace against the Dominican Republic in Saint Lucia's final match of the Group Stage. However, Saint Lucia failed to reach the final tournament following the 2–2 draw.

Caull was called up to the senior national team for the 2022–23 CONCACAF Nations League C. He made his senior international debut on 30 May 2022 in a friendly against Trinidad and Tobago in preparation for the tournament.

== Career statistics ==
=== International goals ===
No.	Date	Venue	Opponent	Score	Result	Competition
1.	28 September 2026	Daren Sammy Cricket Ground, Gros Islet, Saint Lucia	Bermuda	1–0	5–2	2026–27 CONCACAF Nations League B
2.	28 September 2026	Daren Sammy Cricket Ground, Gros Islet, Saint Lucia	Bermuda	2–0	5–2	2026–27 CONCACAF Nations League B
3.	28 September 2026	Daren Sammy Cricket Ground, Gros Islet, Saint Lucia	Bermuda	3–0	5–2	2026–27 CONCACAF Nations League B
4.	5 October 2026	Wildey Turf, Wildey, Barbados	Guadeloupe	1–0	1–0	2026–27 CONCACAF Nations League B
Last updated 6 October 2026

=== International statistics ===
As of match played 5 October 2026

Appearances and goals by national team and year
National team	Year	Apps	Goals
Saint Lucia	2022	1	0
Saint Lucia	2023	0	0
Saint Lucia	2024	0	0
Saint Lucia	2025	3	0
Saint Lucia	2026	4	4
Total		8	4
