= Malik St. Prix =

Saint Lucian footballer

Personal information
- Date of birth: 17 July 1995 (age 31)
- Place of birth: Castries, Saint Lucia
- Position: Midfielder

Senior career*
Years	Team	Apps	(Gls)
2015–2017	W Connection		
2017–2018	C.D.S. Vida		
2019–2021	Northern United All Stars		
2021	PEPO	14	(8)
2022	Cosmos Nowotaniec	6	(4)
2022-	La Clery		

International career^{‡}
2014–	Saint Lucia	27	(2)
- * Club domestic league appearances and goals as of 22 May 2024 ‡ National team caps and goals as of 25 March 2024

Malik St. Prix (born 17 July 1995) is a Saint Lucian footballer who plays as a midfielder. A St. Lucian international, he has also represented clubs in Honduras, Trinidad and Tobago, Finland and Poland.

== Early life ==
St. Prix grew up in Gros Islet where he played football during his schoolyears. His flamboyant style of play led to him earning the nickname "Showtyme". He initially aspired to become a veterinarian but switched his focus to football when he realised he could make a career in the sport.

== Playing career ==
St. Prix's first professional club was W Connection in the TT Pro League. In 2018, he joined Liga Nacional de Fútbol Profesional de Honduras club C.D.S. Vida, making his debut against C.D. Honduras Progreso. Following his departure from the club, he spent two seasons with Northern United All Stars in the SLFA First Division.

In July 2021, St. Prix signed for PEPO Lappeenranta, a club competing in the Ykkönen, the second tier of Finnish football.

== Career statistics ==
=== International ===
As of match played 19 November 2023

Appearances and goals by national team and year
National team	Year	Apps	Goals
Saint Lucia	2014	1	0
Saint Lucia	2015	5	1
Saint Lucia	2016	–	
Saint Lucia	2017	4	0
Saint Lucia	2018	3	0
Saint Lucia	2019	9	1
Saint Lucia	2020	–	
Saint Lucia	2021	–	
Saint Lucia	2022	–	
Saint Lucia	2023	5	0
Total		27	2

Scores and results list Saint Lucia's goal tally first, score column indicates score after each St. Prix goal.

List of international goals scored by Malik St. Prix
No.	Date	Venue	Opponent	Score	Result	Competition
1	12 May 2015	Philip Marcellin Grounds, Vieux-Fort, Saint Lucia	Dominica	1–0	1–1	2015 Windward Islands Tournament
2	2 March 2019	Victoria Park, Kingstown, Saint Vincent and the Grenadines	Saint Vincent and the Grenadines	1–0	1–2	2019 Windward Islands Tournament

== Honours ==
Cosmos Nowotaniec

- Regional league, group Krosno: 2021–22
