= Saint Lucia FA Cup =

Football competition in Saint Lucia

The Saint Lucia FA Cup is the top knockout tournament of the Saint Lucia football.

== Winners ==
- 1998 : Mabouya Valley bt Dennery All Stars
- 1999 : Roots Alley Ballers (Vieux Fort) 5–0 Young Stars (Anse-la-Raye)
- 2000 : Rovers United (Mabouya Valley) 3–2 Northern United (Gros Islet) [aet]
- 2001 : VSADC (Castries) 2–1 Roots Alley Ballers (Vieux Fort) [asdet]
- 2002 : VSADC (Castries) 1–1 Cimpex Orion [aet, 9–8 pen]
- 2003 : 18 Plus (Dennery) 2–1 Pioneers FC (Castries) [asdet]
- 2004 : Northern United (Gros Islet) bt Rovers United (Mabouya Valley)
- 2005–06 : Elite Challengers (Soufrière) 1–1 Canaries (Canaries) [aet, 3–2 pen]
- 2007 : Northern United (Gros Islet) 5–0 Orion
- 2008–09 : Dennery Aux-Lyons 4–1 GSYO
- 2009–10 : final between Soufrière YO and Young Strikers abandoned
- 2013 : Marchand 1–1 Mabouya [aet, 4–3 pen]
