= 1987 CONCACAF Champions' Cup =

23rd edition of premier club football tournament organized by CONCACAF

- Dates: 31 March – 30 September

Final positions
- Champions: (Mexico) América
- Runners-up: (Trinidad and Tobago) Defence Force

The 1987 CONCACAF Champions' Cup was the 23rd edition of the annual international club football competition held in the CONCACAF region (North America, Central America and the Caribbean), the CONCACAF Champions' Cup. It determined that year's club champion of association football in the CONCACAF region and was played from 31 March 1987 till 30 September 1987.

The teams were split into 2 zones, North/Central America and Caribbean, (as North and Central America sections combined to qualify one team for the final), each one qualifying the winner to the final tournament.

Mexican club América beat Trinidadian team Defence Force 3–1 on aggregate, becoming CONCACAF champions for the second time in their history.

== North/Central American Zone ==
=== North section ===
Team 1	Agg.	Team 2	1st leg	2nd leg
St. Louis Kutis SC (United States)	0 - 4	(Mexico) CF Monterrey	0 - 1	0 - 3
América (Mexico)	4 - 0*	(United States) San Pedro Yugoslavs		

- San Pedro Yugoslavs withdrew; both legs officially awarded 2-0 to América.*
- América and CF Monterrey qualified to Semi-Finals.

St. Louis Kutis SC (United States)	0-1	(Mexico) CF Monterrey

CF Monterrey (Mexico)	3-0 (4-0 agg.)	(United States) St. Louis Kutis SC

América (Mexico)	w/o	(United States) San Pedro Yugoslavs

San Pedro Yugoslavs (United States)	w/o (0-4* agg.)	(Mexico) América

=== Central section ===
==== First round ====
Team 1	Agg.	Team 2	1st leg	2nd leg
Real Verdes (Belize)	1–8	(Honduras) Real España	0–2	1–6
Olimpia (Honduras)	9–2	(Belize) Coke Milpross	8–1	1–1

- Real España and Olimpia advance to the second round.

10 May 1987	Real Verdes (Belize)	0–2	(Honduras) Real España	Belize City, Belize
				Stadium: MCC Grounds

13 May 1987	Real España (Honduras)	6–1 (8–1 agg.)	(Belize) Real Verdes	San Pedro Sula, Honduras
				Attendance: Estadio Francisco Morazán

13 May 1987	Olimpia (Honduras)	8–1	(Belize) Coke Milpross	Tegucigalpa, Honduras
				Stadium: Estadio Nacional Chelato Uclés

17 May 1987	Coke Milpross (Belize)	1–1 (2–9 agg.)	(Honduras) Olimpia	Belize City, Belize
				Stadium: MCC Grounds

=== Second round ===
Group 1

Played in Estadio Nacional Chelato Uclés - Tegucigalpa, Honduras

Team	Pld	W	D	L	GF	GA	GD	Pts
(Honduras) Olimpia	3	2	1	0	3	1	+2	5
(Costa Rica) Herediano	3	1	2	0	3	1	+2	4
(El Salvador) Águila	3	1	1	1	6	4	+2	3
(Guatemala) Galcasa	3	0	0	3	1	7	−6	0

Team 1	Score	Team 2
Herediano (Costa Rica)	1 - 1	(El Salvador) Águila
Olimpia (Honduras)	1 - 0	(Guatemala) Galcasa
Águila (El Salvador)	4 - 1	(Guatemala) Galcasa
Olimpia (Honduras)	0 - 0	(Costa Rica) Herediano
Galcasa (Guatemala)	0 - 2	(Costa Rica) Herediano
Olimpia (Honduras)	2 - 1	(El Salvador) Águila

*Olimpia and Herediano advance to the third round group stage.

Herediano (Costa Rica)	1-1	(El Salvador) Águila

June 8, 1987	Olimpia (Honduras)	1-0	(Guatemala) Galcasa
	Juan Carlos Espinoza

Águila (El Salvador)	4-1	(Guatemala) Galcasa

Olimpia (Honduras)	0-0	(Costa Rica) Herediano

Galcasa (Guatemala)	0-2	(Costa Rica) Herediano

Olimpia (Honduras)	2-1	(El Salvador) Águila
Juan Flores prudencio Norales		Julio Herrera

Group 2

Played in Estadio Cuscatlán- San Salvador, El Salvador

Team	Pld	W	D	L	GF	GA	GD	Pts
(Costa Rica) Saprissa	3	1	2	0	6	4	+2	4
(Honduras) Real España	3	2	0	1	4	4	0	4
(Guatemala) Aurora	3	1	1	1	2	2	0	3
(El Salvador) Alianza	3	0	1	2	5	7	−2	1

Team 1	Score	Team 2
Aurora (Guatemala)	0 - 1	(Honduras) Real España
Alianza (El Salvador)	3 - 3	(Costa Rica) Saprissa
Aurora (Guatemala)	0 - 0	(Costa Rica) Saprissa
Alianza (El Salvador)	1 - 2	(Honduras) Real España
Saprissa (Costa Rica)	3 - 1	(Honduras) Real España
Alianza (El Salvador)	1 - 2	(Guatemala) Aurora F.C.

*Saprissa and Real España advance to the third round group stage.

	Aurora (Guatemala)	0-1	(Honduras) Real España
June 8, 1987			Javier Chavarria

June 8, 1987	Alianza (El Salvador)	3-3	(Costa Rica) Saprissa

Aurora (Guatemala)	0-0	(Costa Rica) Saprissa

Alianza (El Salvador)	1-2	(Honduras) Real España
Ramon Pacheco		Javier Chavarria

Saprissa (Costa Rica)	3-1	(Honduras) Real España

Alianza (El Salvador)	1-2	(Guatemala) Aurora
TBD		José Luis González; Omar Reyes

==== Third round ====
Played at Estadio Nacional - San José, Costa Rica.

Team	Pld	W	D	L	GF	GA	GD	Pts
(Honduras) Olimpia	3	2	0	1	6	3	+3	4
(Costa Rica) Saprissa	3	2	0	1	7	6	+1	4
(Costa Rica) Herediano	3	2	0	1	6	7	−1	4
(Honduras) Real España	3	0	0	3	3	6	−3	0

Team 1	Score	Team 2
Herediano (Costa Rica)	3 - 2	(Honduras) Real España
Saprissa (Costa Rica)	1 - 4	(Honduras) Olimpia
Olimpia (Honduras)	1 - 0	(Honduras) Real España
Herediano (Costa Rica)	1 - 4	(Costa Rica) Saprissa
Saprissa (Costa Rica)	2 - 1	(Honduras) Real España
Herediano (Costa Rica)	2 - 1	(Honduras) Olimpia

*Olimpia and Saprissa advance to the Semi-finals.

28 June 1987	Herediano (Costa Rica)	3-2	(Honduras) Real España	San José, Costa Rica
	Mario Orta; Carlos Camacho			Stadium: Estadio Nacional

28 June 1987	Saprissa (Costa Rica)	1-4	(Honduras) Olimpia	San José, Costa Rica
			Juan Cruz Murillo; Juan Flores; José Mario Figueroa [Eugenio Dolmo Flores	Stadium: Estadio Nacional

1 July 1987	Olimpia (Honduras)	1-0	(Honduras) Real España	San José, Costa Rica
	Cruz			Stadium: Estadio Nacional

Herediano (Costa Rica)	1-4	(Costa Rica) Saprissa	San José, Costa Rica
			Stadium: Estadio Nacional

July 5, 1987	Saprissa (Costa Rica)	2-1	(Honduras) Real España	San José, Costa Rica
	Delvaste Araujo; Evaristo Coronado			Stadium: Estadio Nacional; Attendance: 5,310

July 5, 1987	Herediano (Costa Rica)	2-1	(Honduras) Olimpia	San José, Costa Rica
				Stadium: Estadio Nacional; Attendance: 5,310

=== North/Central American semi-finals ===
Team 1	Agg.	Team 2	1st leg	2nd leg
Saprissa (Costa Rica)	3 - 4	(Mexico) América	2 - 2	1 - 2
Olimpia (Honduras)	2 - 3	(Mexico) Monterrey	0 - 1	2 - 2

- América and CF Monterrey advance to the North/Central American Final.

Saprissa (Costa Rica)	2-2	(Mexico) América	San Juan de Tibás, Costa Rica
			Stadium: Estadio Ricardo Saprissa Aymá

América (Mexico)	2–1 (4-3 agg.)	(Costa Rica) Saprissa	Mexico City, Mexico
			Stadium: Estadio Azteca

Olimpia (Honduras)	0-1	(Mexico) Monterrey

September 3, 1987	Monterrey (Mexico)	2–2 (3-2 agg.)	(Honduras) Olimpia	Monterrey
	Francisco Javier Cruz; Rafael Ortega Méndez		Juan Flores; Daniel Zapata	Stadium: Estadio Tecnológico

=== North/Central American Final ===
Team 1	Agg.	Team 2	1st leg	2nd leg
América (Mexico)	5 - 3	(Mexico) Monterrey	3 - 3	2 - 0

- Club América advance to the CONCACAF Final.

América (Mexico)	3-3	(Mexico) Monterrey	Mexico City, Mexico
			Stadium: Estadio Azteca

Monterrey (Mexico)	0-2 (3-5 agg.)	(Mexico) América	Monterrey, Mexico
			Stadium: Estadio Tecnológico

== Caribbean Zone ==
=== First round ===
Team 1	Agg.	Team 2	1st leg	2nd leg
Golden Star (Martinique)	4 - 0	(Saint Lucia) Uptown Rebels	3 - 0	1 - 0
Renegades (Saint Vincent and the Grenadines)	3 - 4	(Martinique) Franciscain	2 - 0	1 - 4
L'Etoile de Morne-à-l'Eau (Guadeloupe)	3 - 3 (4-3 pen)	(Jamaica) Harbour View FC	3 - 1	0 - 2
VSADC (Saint Lucia)	5 - 3	(Guadeloupe) Juventus	5 - 1	0 - 2
Rick's Superstars (Saint Vincent and the Grenadines)	1 - 5	(Trinidad and Tobago) Trintoc	1 - 2	0 - 3

- Defence Force on a bye, to the second round.
- Golden Star, Franciscain, L'Etoile de Morne-à-l'Eau,
  VSADC and Trintoc advance to the second round.

Golden Star (Martinique)	3–0	(Saint Lucia) Uptown Rebels

Uptown Rebels (Saint Lucia)	0-1 (0-4 agg.)	(Martinique) Golden Star

Renegades (Saint Vincent and the Grenadines)	2–0	(Martinique) Franciscain

Franciscain (Martinique)	4-1 (4-3 agg.)	(Saint Vincent and the Grenadines) Renegades

L'Etoile de Morne-à-l'Eau (Guadeloupe)	3-1	(Jamaica) Harbour View FC

Harbour View FC (Jamaica)	2–0 (3-3 (Pen 3-4) agg.)	(Guadeloupe) L'Etoile de Morne-à-l'Eau

VSADC (Saint Lucia)	5-1	(Guadeloupe) Juventus

Juventus (Guadeloupe)	2–0 (3-5 agg.)	(Saint Lucia) VSADC

Rick's Superstars (Saint Vincent and the Grenadines)	1–2	(Trinidad and Tobago) Trintoc

Trintoc (Trinidad and Tobago)	3–0 (5-1 agg.)	Rick's Superstars

=== Second round ===
Team 1	Agg.	Team 2	1st leg	2nd leg
Golden Star (Martinique)	0 - 1	(Trinidad and Tobago) Trintoc	0 - 1	0 - 0
Defence Force (Trinidad and Tobago)	4 - 2	(Martinique) Franciscain	4 - 2	
VSADC (Saint Lucia)	2 - 4*	(Guadeloupe) L'Etoile de Morne-à-l'Eau	1 - 1	1 - 3

- L'Etoile de Morne-à-l'Eau possibly withdrew, after series.*
- Defence Force and Trintoc advance to the Caribbean Zone final round.

Golden Star (Martinique)	0-1	(Trinidad and Tobago) Trintoc

Trintoc (Trinidad and Tobago)	0-0 (1-0 agg.)	(Martinique) Golden Star

Defence Force (Trinidad and Tobago)	4–2 (4-2 agg.)	(Martinique) Franciscain

VSADC (Saint Lucia)	1–1	(Guadeloupe) L'Etoile de Morne-à-l'Eau

L'Etoile de Morne-à-l'Eau (Guadeloupe)	3-1 (4-2 agg.)	(Saint Lucia) VSADC

=== Final round ===
Team 1	Agg.	Team 2	1st leg	2nd leg
Defence Force (Trinidad and Tobago)	3 - 2	(Trinidad and Tobago) Trintoc	2 - 1	1 - 1

- Defence Force advance to the CONCACAF Final.

Defence Force (Trinidad and Tobago)	2-1	(Trinidad and Tobago) Trintoc

Trintoc	1-1 (2-3 agg.)	(Trinidad and Tobago) Defence Force

== Final ==
=== First leg ===
1987 CONCACAF Champions' Cup Final
October 21, 1987
First leg

Defence Force (Trinidad and Tobago)	1–1	(Mexico) América
Sutton 7'	Report	Luna 43'

Hasely Crawford Stadium, Port of Spain

=== Second leg ===
October 28, 1987
8:00 PM
Second leg

América (Mexico)	2–0	(Trinidad and Tobago) Defence Force
Luna 63'; Santos 90'	Report

Estadio Azteca, Mexico City
Attendance: 60,000

Team details

América

Defence Force

GK		(Mexico) Adrián Chávez
DF		(Mexico) Manolo Rodríguez
DF		(Mexico) Guillermo Huerta
DF		(Mexico) José E. Vaca
DF		(Mexico) Efraín Herrera
MF		(Mexico) Cristóbal Ortega
MF		(Mexico) Juan Antonio Luna
MF	10	(Peru) Julio César Uribe
MF	13	(Brazil) Antônio Carlos Santos
FW	27	(Mexico) Carlos Hermosillo	(substituted off) a'
FW	17	(Mexico) Zague
Substitutions:
MF	7	(Mexico) Gonzalo Farfán	(substituted on) a'
Manager:
(Argentina) Cayetano Rodríguez

GK	(Trinidad and Tobago)
DF	(Trinidad and Tobago)
DF	(Trinidad and Tobago)
DF	(Trinidad and Tobago)
DF	(Trinidad and Tobago)
MF	(Trinidad and Tobago)
MF	(Trinidad and Tobago)
FW	(Trinidad and Tobago)
FW	(Trinidad and Tobago)
FW	(Trinidad and Tobago)
FW	(Trinidad and Tobago)
Manager:
?

América won 3–1 on points (3–1 on aggregate).

== Champion ==
CONCACAF Champions' Cup
1987 champions
(Mexico)
América
Second title
