= 2017 SLFA First Division =

SLFA First Division
- Season: 2017
- Champions: Northern United All Stars

The 2017 SLFA First Division was the 39th season of top-division association football in Saint Lucia.

A total of seven teams participated in the competition, with last season's champions Survivals FC not participating. The title was won by Northern United All Stars.
