= 2019 SLFA Island Cup =

2019 2019 SLFA Island Cup
Tournament details
- Country: Saint Lucia
- Dates: 2 July – 21 December 2019

Final positions
- Champions: Gros Islet
- Runners-up: Vieux-Fort South
- Third place: Mabouya Valley
- Fourth place: Marchand
- All statistics correct as of 27 September 2020.

The 2019 SLFA Island Cup was an association football cup competition for the island of Saint Lucia. The tournament began on 2 July 2019 and concluded on 21 December 2019.

Gros Islet won the tournament.

== First Group Stage ==
=== Standings ===
==== Group A ====
Group 1

1.Canaries                 8   7  0  1  19- 7  21  Qualified
2.Vieux Fort South         8   5  1  2  17-13  16  Qualified
3.Roseau Valley            8   5  1  2  12- 9  16  Qualified
4.Gros Islet               8   4  2  2  21-15  14  Qualified
- - - - - - - - - - - - - - - - - - - - - - - - -
5.Desruisseaux             8   4  2  2  12- 8  14
6.Micoud                   8   4  1  3  15-10  13
7.Laborie                  7   1  0  6  10-15   3
8.South Castries           7   1  0  6   7-15   3
9.Mon Repos                8   0  1  7   5-26   1

==== Group B ====
1.Marchand                 7   4  3  0   9- 4  15  Qualified
2.Dennery                  7   4  2  1   9- 5  14  Qualified
3.Central Castries         7   3  3  1  13- 8  12  Qualified
4.Mabouya Valley           7   3  2  2   8- 5  11  Qualified
- - - - - - - - - - - - - - - - - - - - - - - - -
5.Babonneau                7   2  3  2  10- 9  10
6.La Clery                 7   1  4  2   4- 7   7
7.Anse-la-Raye             7   0  3  4   6-13   3
8.Vieux Fort North         7   1  0  6   5-13   3

=== Results ===
2 July 2019	Mon Repos	2–4	Vieux Fort South

2 July 2019	Laborie	2–3	Gros Islet

2 July 2019	Anse-la-Raye	0–0	La Clery

2 July 2019	Dennery	1–0	Vieux Fort North

21 July 2019	Desruisseaux	0–2	Micoud

21 July 2019	Roseau Valley	0–3	Canaries

21 July 2019	Babonneau	1–1	Marchand

21 July 2019	Central Castries	0–0	Mabouya Valley

[Jul 24]
Canaries 2-0 South Castries
Mon Repos 0-5 Gros Islet
[Jul 25]
Roseau Valley 1-2 Vieux Fort South
La Clery 1-2 Dennery
[Jul 28]
Micoud 1-2 Canaries
Desruisseaux 2-1 South Castries
Anse-la-Raye awd Vieux Fort North [awarded 0–3, Anse-la-Raye dns]
Babonneau 0-1 Mabouya Valley
[Aug 1]
La Clery 2-0 Vieux Fort North
Dennery 1-1 Central Castries
[Aug 4]
Mon Repos 1-3 Desruisseaux
Marchand 1-0 Vieux Fort North
Gros Islet 1-2 Roseau Valley
[Aug 5]
Anse-la Raye 1-1 Babonneau
Mabouya Valley 0-0 La Clery
Micoud 2-1 Laborie
South Castries 1-4 Vieux Fort South
[Aug 8]
Vieux Fort North 0-1 Central Castries
Dennery 0-0 Marchand
South Castries 3-0 Mon Repos
Canaries 0-3 Desruisseaux
[Aug 11]
Roseau Valley 1-0 Micoud
Gros Islet 3-0 South Castries [possibly awarded]
Mabouya Valley 5-2 Vieux Fort North
Anse-la-Raye 2-3 Marchand
[Aug 12]
Desruisseaux 1-0 Laborie
Vieux Fort South 0-1 Canaries
Babonneau 2-1 Dennery
La Clery 0-4 Central Castries
[Aug 15]
Roseau Valley 2-1 Desruisseaux
La Clery 0-0 Marchand
Micoud 2-1 South Castries
Central Castries 2-2 Anse-la-Raye
[Aug 18]
Gros Islet 1-7 Canaries
Roseau Valley 2-1 South Castries
[Aug 19]
Babonneau 3-0 Vieux Fort North
Mon Repos 0-5 Micud
Dennery 2-1 Anse-la-Raye
[Aug 22]
Central Castries 4-2 Babonneau
Micoud 2-2 Gros Islet
Marchand 1-0 Mabouya Valley
Laborie awd Roseau Valley [awarded 0-3]
[Aug 25]
Canaries 3-2 Laborie
Babonneau 1-1 La Clery
[Aug 26]
Vieux Fort South 3-1 Micoud
Gros Islet 1-1 Desruisseaux
[Aug 29]
Canaries 1-0 Mon Repos
Dennery 2-0 Mabouya Valley
[Sep 1]
Mon Repos 1-4 Laborie
Gros Islet 5-1 Vieux Fort South
[Sep 2]
Anse-la-Reye 0-2 Mabouya Valley
Central Castries 1-3 Marchand
[Sep 5]
Mon Repos 1-1 Roseau Valley
Desruisseaux 1-1 Vieux Fort South
[Sep 8]
South Castries n/p Laborie
[Sep 14]
Vieux Fort South 2-1 Laborie

Final Tables:

== Second Group Stage ==
Known results [Oct 27] Marchand 3-0 Vieux Fort South Central Castries 2-3 Gros Islet [Dec 1] Canaries 0-1 Roseau Valley [Dec 8] Dennery 1-2 Mabouya Valley

Final Table:

1.Gros Islet               7   5  1  1  15- 9  16  Qualified
2.Mabouya Valley           7   5  0  2  18-14  15  Qualified
3.Vieux Fort South         7   4  1  2  22-10  13  Qualified
4.Marchand                 7   4  1  2  19-10  13  Qualified
- - - - - - - - - - - - - - - - - - - - - - - - -
5.Roseau Valley            7   3  1  3   9-11  10
6.Dennery                  7   1  3  3   7-13   6
7.Canaries                 7   1  1  5   8-21   4
8.Central Castries         7   1  0  6   9-19   3

== Semifinals ==
[Dec 15] Vieux Fort South 3-0 Mabouya Valley [Dec 16] Gros Islet 1-1 Marchand [4-3 pen]

== Third Place Match ==
[Dec 21] Mabouya Valley awd Marchand [awarded 3–0, Marchand dns]

== Final ==
21 December 2019	Vieux Fort South	2–2 (4–5 p)	Gros Islet
