= Rovers United =

Rovers United may refer to:

- Rovers United FC, a St. Lucian football team
- Rovers FC (U.S. Virgin Islands), a football team from the U.S. Virgin Islands, formerly known as Rovers United
