= Laborie FC =

- Full name: Laborie Football Club
- League: Saint Lucia Silver Division
- 2010: 3rd

Laborie Football Club is a Saint Lucian football club based in the Laborie district, competing in the Saint Lucia Silver Division, the second tier of Saint Lucian football.

Laborie FC play their home games at 8,000 capacity George Odlum Stadium.

== Honours ==
- Blackheart/Kashif and Shanghai Cup
  - Runners-up: 2018
