= BPFC =

BPFC may refer to:

- Big Players FC, a sporting club in St. Lucia
- Birkenhead Park FC, a rugby club founded in 1871 in Birkenhead, Wirral, United Kingdom
