= Challengers FC =

Saint Lucian football club

- Full name: Challengers Football Club
- Nickname(s): Challengers
- Founded: 1995
- League: SLFA First Division
- 2013: 6th

Challengers FC is a Saint Lucian football club based in Soufrière, competing in the SLFA First Division, the top tier of Saint Lucian football.
