= Cassim Louis =

Saint Lucian football manager (1948–2021)

Personal information
- Full name: Albert Cassim Louis St. Croix
- Date of birth: 13 September 1948
- Place of birth: Castries, Saint Lucia
- Date of death: 7 January 2021 (aged 72)
- Place of death: OKEU Hospital, Saint Lucia

Managerial career
- Years: Team
- 2000: Saint Lucia
- 2013: Saint Lucia U-15
- 2015: Saint Lucia U-17
- 2015: Saint Lucia U-20

Cassim Louis (13 September 1948 – 7 January 2021), also known as Vaso, was a Saint Lucian football manager.

He was in control of the national team during the 2002 FIFA World Cup qualification campaign where Saint Lucia lost out to Suriname on penalties in the first round. He co-coached the national team with Kingsley Armstrong in 2002.

Louis coached the Under-15 team at the 2013 CONCACAF Under-15 Championship, two years later he led the Under-17 team at the 2015 CONCACAF U-17 Championship.

Louis also coached the Under-20 team at the 2017 CONCACAF U-20 Championship qualifying campaign.
