= Terrence Caroo =

Saint Lucian football manager

Personal information
- Date of birth: 30 August 1964 (age 62)
- Place of birth: Saint Lucia

Managerial career
- Years: Team
- 2006–2010: Saint Lucia

Terrence Caroo (born 30 August 1964) is a Saint Lucian professional football manager.

== Career ==
Since January 2006 until June 2010 he coached the Saint Lucia national football team.
