= Francis McDonald (footballer) =

Saint Lucian footballer and manager

Personal information
- Date of birth: 26 December 1975 (age 50)
- Place of birth: Saint Lucia

Senior career*
Years	Team	Apps	(Gls)
- Northern United All Stars
- NYAH

Managerial career
- 2018: Northern United All Stars
- 2018–2019: Saint Lucia
- * Club domestic league appearances and goals

Francis McDonald (born 26 December 1975) is a former Saint Lucian footballer and current manager.

== Club career ==
During McDonald's playing career, he played for Saint Lucian clubs Northern United All Stars and NYAH.

== Managerial career ==
In 2018, McDonald managed former club Northern United All Stars. In October 2018, McDonald was appointed manager of Saint Lucia, before being replaced by Jamaal Shabazz on 5 May 2019.

== Managerial Statistics ==
As of Match played 22 March 2019

Team	From	To	Record				
Team	From	To	G	W	D	L	Win %
Saint Lucia	October 2018	May 2019	4	2	1	1	50.00
