= Pakis FC =

- Full name: Pakis Football Club
- Nickname(s): Pakis
- Founded: 2005
- League: SLFA First Division
- 2010: 2nd

Pakis FC is a Saint Lucian football club based in the Micoud Quarter, competing in the SLFA First Division, the top tier of Saint Lucian football.
