= Ciceron Seagulls United S.C. =

Sport organization in St. Lucia

Ciceron Seagulls
- Full name: Ciceron Seagulls United Sports and Cultural Club
- Nickname(s): Seagulls
- Founded: 1975
- Ground: Ciceron Secondary School Field
- Capacity: 200
- League: SLFA First Division
- 2016: ?

The Ciceron Seagulls United Sports and Cultural Club is a multi-sport organization based in the Ciceron neighborhood of Castries in St. Lucia. The organization is best known for their football, cricket, tennis and volleyball departments. The organization was founded in 1975.
