= Survivals FC =

- Full name: Survivals Football Club
- Founded: 2010
- Ground: Richfond Field; Mabouya Valley
- Capacity: 1,200
- League: SLFA First Division

Survivals Football Club is a Lucian professional football club based in Mabouya Valley. The team plays in the SLFA First Division, the top tier of Saint Lucian football.

Survivals are the most recent champions of the SLFA First Division, winning the title during the 2016 season.

== Honors ==
- SLFA First Division
  - Champions (1): 2016
- Shawn Edward Cup
  - Champions (1): 2016
