= Square United =

- Full name: Square United
- Founded: April 1981; 45 years ago
- Ground: Phillip Marcellin Grounds
- Manager: Stephen Marcellin
- League: SLFA First Division
- 2010: Silver Division, 4th (promoted)

Square United is a Saint Lucian football club based in Vieux Fort, competing in the SLFA First Division, the top tier of Saint Lucian football.Their club colours are maroon, red, white and navy blue. Their motto is "Working together for the betterment of all". The club competed in regional tournaments in 2013.
