= BAYS FC =

Saint Lucian football club

- Full name: Bexon Active Youth Squad Football Club
- Manager: Roger Joseph
- League: SLFA First Division
- 2023: 1st
- Website: Website

BAYS FC is a Saint Lucian football club based Bexon near Castries that currently competes in the SLFA First Division.

== History ==
The Bexon Active Youth Squad Football Club was founded in the 1980s. The club won the 2022/2023 SLFA Second Division, suffering just one defeat that season. The following season, the club won the SLFA First Division, again suffering a single defeat during the season. In the process, BAYS FC qualified as Saint Lucia's representative in the 2024 CFU Club Shield.

== International competition ==
Results list BAY FC's goal tally first.

| Competition | Round | Club | Score |
|---|---|---|---|
| 2024 CFU Club Shield | Preliminary round | (Sint Maarten) SCSA Eagles | 1–0 |
| 2024 CFU Club Shield | Round of 16 | (Curaçao) Jong Holland | 0–3 |
