= R.V. Juniors =

- Full name: Roseau Valley Juniors
- Founded: 2001
- League: SLFA First Division
- 2017: 8th
- Website: https://www.facebook.com/pg/Roseau-Valley-Juniors-Youth-Sports-Club-1642235515995344/photos/?tab=album&album_id=1642302319321997

The Roseau Valley Juniors or more commonly, R.V. Juniors, are a Lucian football club based in the Anse la Raye Quarter. The club currently plays in the SLFA First Division, the top tier of Saint Lucian football.
