= Lancers FC =

- Full name: Lancers Football Club
- Nickname(s): Lancers
- Founded: 1973
- Ground: Castries, Saint Lucia
- League: SLFA First Division
- 2013: 3rd

Lancers FC is a Saint Lucian football club located in Castries, competing in the SLFA First Division, the top tier of Saint Lucian football.
