= Alfons Lemmens =

Dutch footballer

Personal information
- Date of birth: April 19, 1919
- Place of birth: North Brabant, the Netherlands
- Date of death: January 18, 2013 (aged 93)
- Position: Defender

Senior career*
Years	Team	Apps	(Gls)
1943 – 1946	Philips Sport Vereniging	0	(1)
Total		0	(1)
- * Club domestic league appearances and goals

Alfons Lemmens (April 19, 1919 – January 18, 2013) was a Dutch association football player who played as a defender for the professional football department of sports club Philips Sport Vereniging.
