= 2012–13 Guam Men's Soccer League =

Guam Men's Soccer League
- Season: 2012–13
- Champions: Quality Distributors

2012–13 Guam Men's Soccer League, officially named Budweiser Guam Men's Soccer League due to sponsorship reason, is the association football league of Guam.

== Standings ==
Pos	Team	Pld	W	D	L	GF	GA	GD	Pts
1	Quality Distributors (C)	20	14	4	2	91	29	+62	46
2	Guam Shipyard	20	12	1	7	64	42	+22	37
3	Fuji-Ichiban Espada FC	20	9	7	4	83	43	+40	34
4	Southern Cobras	20	10	4	6	81	57	+24	34
5	Paintco Strykers	20	6	2	12	56	67	−11	20
6	Doosan FC	20	0	0	20	17	154	−137	0

Source: rsssf.com
(C) Champions
