= Andrzej Czyżniewski =

Polish footballer, referee and executive

Personal information
- Date of birth: 28 September 1953
- Place of birth: Toruń, Poland
- Date of death: 9 July 2013 (aged 59)
- Place of death: Miszewo, Poland
- Height: 1.87 m (6 ft 2 in)
- Position: Goalkeeper

Senior career*
Years	Team	Apps	(Gls)
- Pomorzanin Toruń
1972–1974	Zawisza Bydgoszcz		
1974–1976	Chemik Bydgoszcz		
1976–1982	Arka Gdynia	47	(0)
1982–1987	Bałtyk Gdynia	95+	(0)
1987–1988	Polish-American Eagles SC		
- * Club domestic league appearances and goals

Andrzej Czyżniewski (28 September 1953 – 9 July 2013) was a Polish footballer, referee, goalkeeping coach and executive.

== Club career ==
Czyżniewski played 57 games for Arka Gdynia, winning the Polish Cup in 1979, and 95 league matches for Bałtyk Gdynia.

== Post-playing career ==
Czyżniewski was a member of the Poland national team's coaching staff as a goalkeeping coach during the UEFA Euro 2000 qualifying. From 1999 to 2001, he was a member of the board and vice-director of sports of Arka Gdynia. He also had a spell abroad with Anorthosis Famagusta as a goalkeeping coach. From 2002 through 2006, he was a goalkeeping coach at Amica Wronki. He moved to Lech Poznan to become director of scouting until 2009. From 2009 to 2012, he served as the sporting director of Arka.

== Honours ==
Arka Gdynia

- Polish Cup: 1978–79
