= Ludwig Zausinger =

German footballer

Personal information
- Full name: Ludwig Zausinger
- Place of birth: Germany
- Height: 1.69 m (5 ft 6 1/2 in)
- Positions: Winger; right midfielder

Senior career*
Years	Team	Apps	(Gls)
1950–1961	TSV 1860 München	249	(43)
- FC Salzburg
- FC Kufstein
- * Club domestic league appearances and goals

Ludwig "Wiggerl" Zausinger (24 February 1929 – 1 March 2013) was a German footballer who played as an attacking right winger. He died at the age of 84.
