= SLFA President's Cup =

Football tournament in Saint Lucia

The SLFA President's Cup is a knockout football tournament held in Saint Lucia that is open to the top two clubs from 19 districts that are affiliated with the Saint Lucia Football Association. The competition began in 2015.

== Past winners ==
- 2015: Young Roots
- 2016: VSADC 2–1 TiRocher
