= Martin Barbarič =

Czech footballer and murderer

Personal information
- Date of birth: 14 October 1970
- Place of birth: Hradec Králové, Czechoslovakia
- Date of death: 18 January 2013 (aged 42)
- Place of death: Hradec Králové, Czech Republic
- Height: 1.81 m (5 ft 11 in)
- Position: Striker

Senior career*
Years	Team	Apps	(Gls)
1991–1993	Dukla Prague		
1993–1995	FC Svit Zlín	42	(3)
1996–2000	FC Slovan Liberec	79	(22)
1998–1999	→ AS Trenčín (loan)	8	(2)
2001–2002	FC Hradec Králové	3	(0)
- * Club domestic league appearances and goals

Martin Barbarič (14 October 1970 – 18 January 2013) was a Czech professional football player who made 135 top flight appearances across the end of the Czechoslovak First League and start of the Czech First League for Dukla Prague, Svit Zlín, Slovan Liberec and FC Hradec Králové between 1991 and 2002.

On 11 January 2013, in a murder–suicide, Barbarič shot and killed his ex-wife in Hradec Králové. He then shot himself and was taken to the hospital in critical condition. He died a week later.

== Early life ==
Barbarič was born in Hradec Králové, Czechoslovakia on 14 October 1970.

== Career ==
Barbarič made his debut in the Czechoslovak First League for Dukla Prague in the 1991–92 season. He scored two goals in 11 appearances before joining Svit Zlín in 1993. There he would make 42 appearances and scored three goals in two seasons. Barbarič had his most successful spell after joining Slovan Liberec in 1996. He scored 22 goals in 79 appearances before leaving to join FC Hradec Králové in 2001. Barbarič finished his career at FC Hradec Králové where he made three appearances in the 2001–02 season.

== After football ==
After retiring from his career as a professional footballer, Barbarič pursued a career as a police officer in the Police of the Czech Republic. He was also the under-11 coach for FC Hradec Králové.

== Murder of ex-wife ==
Prior to Christmas 2012, Barbarič and his wife split up. On 11 January 2013, he entered the hair salon that his wife worked in Hradec Králové opposite the Regional Court and the pair had an argument. At around 2pm, Barbarič shot his ex-wife twice before shooting himself in a murder–suicide. Both Barbarič and his wife were taken to the local hospital. His ex-wife died from her injuries later that day. Barbarič died from his injuries a week later on 18 January 2013.
