= 2013 Sheikh Jassim Cup =

Tournament details
- Country: Qatar
- Dates: 20 July – 7 September
- Teams: 18

The 2013 Sheikh Jassim Cup was the 35th edition of the league cup competition for football teams from Qatar.

Al Rayyan were the defending champions.

== Groups ==
18 clubs from the Qatar Stars League and Qatari 2nd Division were drawn into 4 groups. The winners of each group qualify for the semi-finals.

All group games are played in one 'host' location, instead of the common home and away format used in other competitions.

Group A	Group B	Group C	Group D
Al-Arabi; Al-Gharafa; Al-Markhiya; Al-Rayyan	Al-Jaish; Qatar SC; Al-Sailiya; Al-Shahaniya; Al-Shamal	Al-Ahli; Al-Wakra; Lekhwiya; Umm-Salal	Al-Kharitiyath; Al-Khor; Al-Mesaimeer; Al-Mu'aidar; Al-Sadd

== Group stage ==
=== Group A ===
Team	Pld	W	D	L	GF	GA	GD	Pts
Al-Rayyan	3	2	0	1	8	2	+6	6
Al-Arabi	3	2	0	1	8	3	+5	6
Al-Gharafa	3	2	0	1	5	5	0	6
Al-Markhiya	3	0	0	3	0	11	−11	0

=== Group B ===
Team	Pld	W	D	L	GF	GA	GD	Pts
Al-Jaish	4	3	1	0	11	4	+7	10
Al-Sailiya	4	3	0	1	9	2	+7	9
Al-Shahaniya	4	1	1	2	8	11	−3	4
Al-Shamal	4	1	1	2	2	7	−5	4
Qatar SC	4	0	1	3	1	7	−6	1

=== Group C ===
Team	Pld	W	D	L	GF	GA	GD	Pts
Al-Wakra	3	3	0	0	5	1	+4	9
Lekhwiya	3	2	0	1	4	3	+1	6
Umm-Salal	3	1	0	2	3	2	+1	3
Al-Ahli	3	0	0	3	3	9	−6	0

=== Group D ===
Team	Pld	W	D	L	GF	GA	GD	Pts
Al-Kharitiyath	4	3	0	1	7	2	+5	9
Al-Khor	4	2	0	2	8	5	+3	6
Al-Mu'aidar	4	2	0	2	4	4	0	6
Al-Sadd	4	2	0	2	5	7	−2	6
Al-Mesaimeer	4	1	0	3	1	7	−6	3

== Semi finals ==
4 September	Al-Jaish	1 – 2	Al-Kharitiyath
20:30

4 September	Al-Rayyan	3 – 0	Al-Wakra
20:30

== Final ==
7 September	Al-Rayyan	2 – 0	Al-Kharitiyath
20:30
