= Ray Drake =

English footballer (1934–2013)

Personal information
- Full name: Raymond Bradwell Drake
- Date of birth: 24 October 1934
- Place of birth: Stockport, England
- Date of death: 30 March 2013 (aged 78)
- Place of death: Stockport, England
- Position: Forward

Senior career*
Years	Team	Apps	(Gls)
1956–1958	Stockport County	23	(19)
1958	Altrincham	5	(1)
1958-1960	Hyde United		
1961-1962	Cheadle Town		
- * Club domestic league appearances and goals

Raymond Bradwell Drake (24 October 1934 – 30 March 2013) was an English footballer who played in the Football League for Stockport County.

== Career ==
Drake was born in Stockport and joined local side Stockport County in 1956. Drake made an instant impact for County scoring 19 goals in the first season as a professional. This prompted Bolton Wanderers to make a move for him as they saw him as a replacement for Nat Lofthouse but a move did not materialise. Drake then had a major fall out with the manager Willie Moir and he left and went on to play in non-league football.

He joined Altrincham F.C. in 1958, scoring once in 5 games. He later plated for Hyde United and Cheadle Town.
