= Kingsley Armstrong =

Saint Lucian football manager

Personal information
- Date of birth: 10 December 1962 (age 63)
- Place of birth: Saint Lucia

Managerial career
- Years: Team
- 1996: Saint Lucia
- 2002–2004: Saint Lucia

Kingsley Armstrong (born 10 December 1962) is a Saint Lucian professional football manager.

== Career ==
In 1996 and since January 2002 until June 2004 he coached the Saint Lucia national football team.
