= SLFA Second Division =

The Saint Lucia Silver Division (formerly known as the Silver Division) is the second tier of Saint Lucian football.

== Clubs (From 2022) ==
- BAYS FC
- 1987 All Stars SCC
- Black Panthers SC
- Piton Travel Young Stars SC
- Diamond Ballers FC
- Knights SC
- New Generation FC
- Lancers FC
- St. Lucia U17
- Togetherness Youth SSC
