= Mabouya Valley =

Valley in eastern Saint Lucia

Mabouya Valley (Saint Lucia)

The Mabouya Valley in eastern St. Lucia in Dennery District contains two rivers, the Grande Rivière du Mabouya and the Dernière Rivière. The forested hillsides have, in places, been cleared for farming and the valley receives annual rainfall of 3000 mm (118 inches) at its head in Barre de l'Isle and 2000 mm (79 inches) at La Caye.

== Locations in the Mabouya Valley region ==
- Dennery village (seat of Dennery District), 13°54′51″N 60°53′29″W
- Grande Rivière du Mabouya, 13°56′10″N 60°54′31″W (mouth)
- Dernière Rivière, 13°56′11″N 60°54′31″W
- Dernière Rivière village, 13°57′14″N 60°55′28″W
- Mabouya Valley,
- Maybouya village, 13°56′04″N 60°55′52″W

== See also ==
- List of rivers of Saint Lucia
- Dennery District
