= Rovers United FC =

Association football club in Saint Lucia

Rovers United
- Full name: Rovers United Football Club
- Nickname(s): The Rovers
- Ground: Mindoo Philip Park
- League: SLFA First Division
- Website: http://roversunited.wix.com/roversunited

Rovers United FC is a Saint Lucian professional football club based in Castries, competing in the SLFA First Division, the top tier of Saint Lucian football.
