= Saint Lucia Football Association =

Governing body of association football in Saint Lucia

CONCACAF
- Short name: SLFA
- Founded: 1979
- Headquarters: Castries
- FIFA affiliation: 1988
- CONCACAF affiliation: 1986
- President: Lyndon Cooper
- Website: www.stluciafa.org

The Saint Lucia Football Association is the governing body of football in Saint Lucia. The FA was founded in 1979, the same year the island gained independence, and is headquartered in Castries, the nation's capital. It runs the Saint Lucia men's and women's junior and senior national teams, as well as its domestic football competitions, which include both men's and women's professional leagues and youth championships.

In international competition, Saint Lucia's football teams have had some modest success against their Caribbean neighbors, but beyond that geographical area their experience is quite limited. In fact, when the men's team faced Panama in qualifying for the 2006 FIFA World Cup, it marked the first time they had ever played an opponent outside the Caribbean zone. The men's team has attempted to qualify for the World Cup four times, but has yet to make it past the second preliminary round in the CONCACAF region. They have been more competitive in Caribbean Cup competition, advancing as far as the semifinals. The women's national team attempted to qualify for the Women's World Cup for the first time in 2003, but did not advance past the first qualifying round despite securing two wins and a draw.

== Saint Lucia's withdrawal from the FIFA World Cup Qualifiers 2021 ==
Saint Lucia national footballers held a demonstration in front of the St. Lucia Football Association (SLFA) headquarters in Castries on 24 March 2021. The protest was held due to the withdrawal of the country from the FIFA World Cup qualifiers 2021.

Footballers raised their voice after stating no communication between the country players and the SLFA was made. Players found this was disrespectful to the country's local home based players. The players felt that they were not being considered for the upcoming qualifiers.

St. Lucia was set to play the Nicaragua national football team in Nicaragua on 24 March 2021 in Groupe E of the qualifiers for the grand 2022 World Cup held in Qatar. Frustrated players called for the resignation of the then president Lyndon Cooper. Players held placards stating "Lyndon Cooper must go."

== Association staff ==
Name	Position	Source
(Saint Lucia) Lyndon Cooper	President	
(Saint Lucia) Stephen Regis	Vice-president	
(Saint Lucia) Victor Reid	General secretary	
n/a	Treasurer	
(Saint Kitts and Nevis) Ces Podd	Technical director	
(Trinidad and Tobago) Stern John	Team coach (men's)	
(Saint Lucia) Francis McDonald	Team coach (women's)	
(Saint Lucia) Michael Pierre	Media/communications manager	
n/a	Futsal Coordinator	
(Saint Lucia) Antoine Kevin	Referee coordinator	
