= SLFA First Division =

Saint Lucian association football league

- Founded: 1979
- First season: 1980
- Country: Saint Lucia
- Confederation: CONCACAF
- Number of clubs: 8
- Level on pyramid: 1
- Relegation to: SLFA Second Division
- Domestic cup: SLFA President's Cup
- International cup: CFU Club Shield
- Current champions: BAYS FC (2024)
- Most championships: VSADC (9)
- Current: 2025 SLFA First Division

The SLFA First Division (previously known as the Gold Division) is the top division of football under the Saint Lucia Football Association.

== Champions ==
Season	Champion
1980	Dames SC
1981	Uptown Rebels
1982–1996	Unknown
1997	Pioneers FC
1998	Rovers United (? – VSADC?)
1999	Roots Alley Ballers
2000	Roots Alley Ballers
2001	VSADC
2002	VSADC
2003–04	Roots Alley Ballers
2004–05	Northern United
2005–06	Canaries FC
2006–07	Anse Chastanet GYSO
2007–08	Anse Chastanet GYSO
2008	Aux Lyons United
2009	Roots Alley Ballers
2010	Northern United
2011	VSADC
2012	VSADC
2013	Big Players FC
2015	Young Roots
2016	Survivals
2017	Northern United
2018	Platinum FC
2019	Platinum FC
2020	abandoned due to the COVID-19 pandemic
2021	Platinum FC
2022	B1 FC
2023	BAYS FC

== Titles by club ==
Club	Titles	Seasons won
Roots Alley Ballers	4	1999, 2000, 2003–04, 2009
VSADC	4	2001, 2002, 2011, 2012
Northern United All Stars	3	2004–05, 2010, 2017
Platinum FC	3	2018, 2019, 2021
Anse Chastanet GYSO	2	2006–07, 2007–08
Dames SC	1	1980
Uptown Rebels	1	1981
Pioneers FC	1	1997
Rovers United FC	1	1998
Canaries FC	1	2005–06
Aux Lyons United	1	2008
Big Players FC	1	2013
Young Roots FC	1	2015
Survivals FC	1	2016
B1 FC	1	2022
BAYS FC	1	2023

== Top goalscorers ==
Season	Goalscorer	Club	Goals
2007–08	(Saint Lucia) Andres Canavharo	VSADC	12
2008	(Saint Lucia) Andres Canavharo	Square United	18
2009	(Saint Lucia) Victor Dames	Rovers United FC	13
2010	(Paraguay) Salvador Pirla	Northern United	15
2011	(Saint Lucia) Andres Canavharo	VSADC	11
2018	(Dominica) Randolph Peltier	Northern United	7
2019	(Saint Lucia) Delon Neptune	Platinum FC	9
2019	(Saint Lucia) Shaquille Degazon	VSADC	9
2021	(Saint Lucia) Sherwin Simon	Northern United	7
2022	(Saint Lucia) Donavan Junior	Uptown Rebels SC	10
2023	(Saint Lucia) Troy Greenidge	Monchy United	12
2024	(Saint Lucia) Lincoln Philip	Big Players	11

== Multiple hat-tricks ==
Rank	Country	Player	Hat-tricks
1	(Saint Lucia)	Kegan Caull	1
1	(Saint Lucia)	Donavan Baptiste	1
1	(Saint Lucia)	Troy Greenidge	1
1	(Saint Lucia)	Jeanlique Gonzague	1
1	(Saint Lucia)	Tev Lawrence	1
1	(Saint Lucia)	Delon Neptune	1
1	(Saint Lucia)	Mahuy Rismay	1
