= Uptown Rebels SC =

Uptown Rebels
- Full name: Uptown Rebels SC
- Ground: Philip Marcellin Grounds
- Capacity: 1,000
- League: SLFA First Division

Uptown Rebels SC is a Saint Lucian professional football club based in Vieux Fort. The club plays in the SLFA First Division.
