= Platinum FC =

- Full name: Platinum Football Club
- Ground: Philip Marcellin Grounds
- Capacity: 1,000
- Manager: Sylvester Henry
- League: SLFA First Division
Home colours	Away colours

Platinum Football Club is a Saint Lucian professional football club based in Vieux Fort. The club plays in the SLFA First Division.
