= Vempers Sports Athletic Dramatic Club =

VSADC
- Full name: Vempers Sports Athletic Dramatic Club
- Nickname(s): VSADC, Vempers
- Founded: 1951; 74 years ago
- League: SLFA First Division

Vempers Sports Athletic Dramatic Club, often referred to by their acronym VSADC, is a Saint Lucian professional football club based in Castries, competing in the SLFA First Division, the top tier of Saint Lucian football.

== Honors ==
- SLFA First Division
  - Champions: 1982, 1984, 1985, 1986, 1998, 2001, 2002, 2011, 2012
- SLFA President's Cup
  - Champions: 2016
