= Big Players FC =

- Full name: Big Players Football Club
- Nickname(s): Big Ballers
- Founded: 1983
- Ground: Marchand Grounds, Marchand, Castries, St. Lucia
- Capacity: 1,000
- League: SLFA First Division
| Home colours | Away colours |

Big Players FC is a Saint Lucian professional football club based in Marchand, competing in the SLFA First Division, the top tier of Saint Lucian football.
