= Northern United All Stars =

- Full name: Northern United All Stars
- Nickname(s): All Stars
- Ground: Gros Islet Cricket Oval
- Capacity: 200
- League: SLFA First Division
Home colours	Away colours

Northern United All Stars is a Saint Lucian professional football club based in Gros Islet, that competes in the SLFA First Division, the highest division of Saint Lucian football league system.

The club participated in the 2011 CFU Club Championship, playing in the first elimination stage of the Preliminary phase. There, Northern United took on the Surinamese Hoofdklasse runners-up, Walking Bout Company. In the tournament, they were eliminated 6–1 on aggregate, losing 3–0 at home to WBC, and 3–1 at WBC.

== Performance in international competitions ==
Northern United's score listed first.

- 2005 CFU Club Championship

First Round v. (United States Virgin Islands) Positive Vibes – 0:2, 5:0
Quarter-finals v. (Netherlands Antilles) Victory Boys – 1:1, 1:0
Semi-finals v. (Suriname) Robinhood – 1:3, 2:4

- 2011 CFU Club Championship

First Stage v. (Suriname) Walking Bout Company – 0:3, 1:3
