= Football in Saint Lucia =

- Country: Saint Lucia
- Governing body: Saint Lucia Football Association
- National team: Saint Lucia national football team

National competitions
- Saint Lucia FA Cup

Club competitions
- Men's: SLFA First Division

International competitions
- Men's: CONCACAF Champions League; FIFA Club World Cup; CONCACAF Gold Cup (National Team); CONCACAF Nations League (National Team); FIFA World Cup (National Team); Women's: CONCACAF Women's Championship (National Team); FIFA Women's World Cup (National Team)

The sport of association football in the country of Saint Lucia is run by the Saint Lucia Football Association. The association administers the national football team, as well as the SLFA First Division.
