= 2026 in association football =

The following are the scheduled events of association football for the calendar year 2026 throughout the world. This includes the following:

- In countries whose league seasons fall within a single calendar year, the 2026 season.
- In countries which crown one champion in a season that spans two calendar years, the 2025–26 season.
- In countries which split their league season into two championships, a system often known in Latin America as Apertura and Clausura, all championships awarded in calendar 2026.

== Events ==
=== Men's national teams ===
==== FIFA ====
- 25–30 March: 2026 FIFA Series in Australia, Azerbaijan, Indonesia, Kazakhstan, New Zealand, Puerto Rico, Rwanda and Uzbekistan
  - Australia: (gold) Australia, (silver) Cameroon, (bronze) China, 4th: Curaçao
  - Azerbaijan: (gold) Azerbaijan, (silver) Sierra Leone, (bronze) Saint Lucia
  - Indonesia: (gold) Bulgaria, (silver) Indonesia, (bronze) Saint Kitts and Nevis, 4th: Solomon Islands
  - Kazakhstan: (gold) Kazakhstan, (silver) Namibia, (bronze) Comoros
  - New Zealand: (gold) Finland, (silver) New Zealand, (bronze) Chile, 4th: Cape Verde
  - Puerto Rico: (gold) Puerto Rico, (silver) U.S. Virgin Islands, (bronze) Guam, 4th: American Samoa
  - Rwanda A: (gold) Rwanda, (silver) Estonia, (bronze) Kenya, 4th: Grenada
  - Rwanda B: (gold) Aruba, (silver) Liechtenstein, (bronze) Tanzania, 4th: Macau
  - Uzbekistan: (gold) Uzbekistan, (silver) Venezuela, (bronze) Gabon, 4th: Trinidad and Tobago
- 27 March: 2026 Finalissima in Qatar (Cancelled)
- 11 June – 19 July: 2026 FIFA World Cup in Canada, Mexico and the United States
  - (gold) : Spain
  - (silver) : Argentina
  - (bronze) : England
  - 4th: France
- 21 September – 6 October: 2026 FIFA ASEAN Cup
  - 1st Division: (gold) Indonesia, (silver) Thailand, (bronze) Malaysia, 4th: Vietnam
  - 2nd Division: (gold) Hong Kong, (silver) Cambodia
- 22–31 October: 2026 FIFA U-15 World Cup & Festival
  - (gold) : Spain
  - (silver) : Czech Republic
  - (bronze) : Greece
  - 4th: Paraguay
- 6–8 November: 2026 Futsal Finalissima in Brazil
- 19 November – 13 December: 2026 FIFA U-17 World Cup in Qatar

==== AFC ====
- 6–24 January: 2026 AFC U-23 Asian Cup in Saudi Arabia
  - (gold) : Japan
  - (silver) : China
  - (bronze) : Vietnam
  - 4th: South Korea
- 27 January – 7 February: 2026 AFC Futsal Asian Cup in Indonesia
  - (gold) : Iran
  - (silver) : Indonesia
- 7–24 May: 2026 AFC U-17 Asian Cup in Saudi Arabia
  - (gold) : Japan
  - (silver) : China
- 14 September – 2 October: Football at the 2026 Asian Games – Men's tournament in Japan
  - (gold) : South Korea
  - (silver) : Japan
  - (bronze) : China
  - 4th: Uzbekistan

===== AFF =====
- 11–23 April: 2026 ASEAN U-17 Boys' Championship in Indonesia
  - (gold) : Vietnam
  - (silver) : Malaysia
  - (bronze) : Australia
  - 4th: Laos
- 1–13 June: 2026 ASEAN U-19 Boys' Championship in Indonesia
  - (gold) : Australia
  - (silver) : Thailand
  - (bronze) : Indonesia
  - 4th: Cambodia
- 24 July – 26 August: 2026 ASEAN Championship
  - (gold) : Vietnam
  - (silver) : Thailand

===== CAFA =====
- 4–14 April: 2026 CAFA U-17 Championship in Uzbekistan
  - (gold) : Tajikistan
  - (silver) : Uzbekistan
  - (bronze) : Kyrgyzstan
  - 4th: Turkmenistan
- 12–19 May: 2026 CAFA U20 Championship in Tajikistan
  - (gold) : Uzbekistan
  - (silver) : Kyrgyzstan
  - (bronze) : Tajikistan
  - 4th: Turkmenistan

===== GFF =====
- 23 September – 6 October: 27th Arabian Gulf Cup in Saudi Arabia
  - (gold) : Saudi Arabia
  - (silver) : United Arab Emirates

===== SAFF =====
- 23 March – 3 April: 2026 SAFF U-20 Championship in Maldives
  - (gold) : Bangladesh
  - (silver) : India
- 5–17 November: 2026 SAFF Championship in Bangladesh

===== UAFA =====
- 5–9 November: 2026 Arab Beach Soccer Championship in Egypt
  - (gold) : Morocco
  - (silver) : Mauritania

===== WAFF =====
- 23 March – 2 April: 2026 WAFF U-20 Championship in Kuwait
  - Cancelled due for security reasons
- 26 September – 5 October: 2026 WAFF U-17 Championship in Jordan
  - (gold) : Lebanon
  - (silver) : Yemen

==== CAF ====
- 21 December 2025 – 18 January 2026: 2025 Africa Cup of Nations in Morocco
  - (gold) : Morocco
  - (silver) : Senegal
  - (bronze) : Nigeria
  - 4th: Egypt
- 2–10 April: 2026 CAF African Schools Football Championship in Zimbabwe
  - (gold) : Senegal
  - (silver) : Uganda
  - (bronze) : Benin
  - 4th: Morocco
- 13 May – 2 June: 2026 U-17 Africa Cup of Nations in Morocco
  - (gold) : Senegal
  - (silver) : Tanzania
  - (bronze) : Egypt
  - 4th: Morocco

===== UNAF =====
- 4–8 February: 2026 UNAF U-16 Tournament in Morocco
  - (gold) : Tunisia
  - (silver) : Algeria
  - (bronze) : Morocco
  - 4th: Libya
- 24 March – 5 April: 2026 UNAF U-17 Tournament in Libya
  - (gold) : Morocco
  - (silver) : Algeria
  - (bronze) : Egypt
  - 4th: Tunisia
- 24 September – 6 October: 2026 UNAF U-20 Tournament in Egypt
  - (gold) : Egypt
  - (silver) : Morocco
  - (bronze) : Algeria
  - 4th: Libya

===== CECAFA =====
- 15–25 September: 2026 CECAFA U-20 Championship in Tanzania
  - (gold) : Sudan
  - (silver) : Tanzania
  - (bronze) : Uganda
  - 4th: Burundi

===== COSAFA =====
- 18–27 September: 2026 COSAFA U-20 Cup in Mauritius
  - (gold) : South Africa
  - (silver) : Mozambique
  - (bronze) : Zambia
  - 4th: Namibia

==== CONCACAF ====
- 12 November 2025 – 31 March: 2025–26 CONCACAF Series in Dominican Republic, Saint Kitts and Nevis, Antigua and Barbuda, Cayman Islands, Bonaire
  - November Series:
    - Group A: (gold) Cuba, (silver) Dominican Republic, (bronze) Saint Vincent and the Grenadines, 4th: Martinique
    - Group B: (gold) Belize, (silver) Sint Maarten, (bronze) Saint Martin, 4th: Saint Kitts and Nevis
    - Group C: (gold) Guyana, (silver) Aruba, (bronze) Barbados, 4th: Antigua and Barbuda
    - Group D: (gold) British Virgin Islands, (silver) Cayman Islands, (bronze) Anguilla, 4th: Bahamas
  - March Series:
    - Group A: (gold) El Salvador, (silver) Dominican Republic, (bronze) Cuba, 4th: Martinique
    - Group B: (gold) Guyana, (silver) Sint Maarten, (bronze) Dominica, 4th: Belize
    - Group C: (gold) Saint Martin, (silver) Saint Vincent and the Grenadines, (bronze) Bonaire, 4th: Barbados
    - Group D: (gold) British Virgin Islands, (silver) Cayman Islands, (bronze) Anguilla, 4th: Bahamas
- 3–12 February: 2026 CONCACAF U-17 World Cup qualification
  - Qualified teams: Costa Rica, Cuba, Haiti, Honduras, Jamaica, Mexico, Panama and United States
- 25 July – 9 August: 2026 CONCACAF U-20 Championship in Mexico
  - (gold) : Mexico
  - (silver) : United States

==== CFU ====
- 16–23 August: 2026 CFU Boys' U14 Challenge Series in Dominican Republic

Tier I

  - (gold) : Haiti
  - (silver) : Jamaica

Tier II

  - (gold) : Guyana
  - (silver) : Suriname

==== UNCAF ====
- 7–13 October: 2026 UNCAF U-16 Tournament in El Salvador
  - (gold) : El Salvador
  - (silver) : Panama
  - (bronze) : Guatemala
  - 4th: Costa Rica

==== CONMEBOL ====
- 3–19 April: 2026 South American U-17 Championship in Paraguay
  - (gold) : Colombia
  - (silver) : Argentina
  - (bronze) : Brazil
  - 4th: Ecuador
- 8–20 September: 2026 CONMEBOL Boys' U-15 Evolution League in Paraguay
  - (gold) : Brazil
  - (silver) : Paraguay
  - (bronze) : Argentina
  - 4th: Ecuador
- 16–23 September: Football at the 2026 South American Games in Argentina
  - (gold) : Paraguay
  - (silver) : Argentina
  - (bronze) : Peru
  - 4th: Chile

==== OFC ====
- 12–25 July: 2026 OFC U-16 Men's Championship in Papua New Guinea
  - (gold) : New Zealand
  - (silver) : Fiji
  - (bronze) : Solomon Islands
  - 4th: Papua New Guinea
- 30 August – 12 September: 2026 OFC U-19 Men's Championship in Tahiti
  - (gold) : New Zealand
  - (silver) : Tahiti
  - (bronze) : Solomon Islands
  - 4th: New Caledonia

==== UEFA ====
- 25 May – 7 June: 2026 UEFA European Under-17 Championship in Estonia
  - (gold) : Italy
  - (silver) : Belgium
- 28 June – 11 July: 2026 UEFA European Under-19 Championship in Wales
  - (gold) : Spain
  - (silver) : Germany

==== World competitions ====
- 25–31 March: 2026 CFA Team China Cup in China
  - (gold) : North Korea
  - (silver) : China
  - (bronze) : Thailand
  - 4th: Vietnam
- 25–31 March: 2026 Tri-Nation Series in India
  - (gold) : Tajikistan
  - (silver) : India
  - (bronze) : Bhutan
- 28–31 March: 2026 Mukuru 4 Nations Tournament in Botswana
  - (gold) : Zimbabwe
  - (silver) : Zambia
  - (bronze) : Malawi
  - 4th: Botswana
- 26–30 May: 2026 Unity Cup in England
  - (gold) : Nigeria
  - (silver) : Jamaica
  - (bronze) : Zimbabwe
  - 4th: India
- 31 May – 7 June: 2016 U-16 International Dream Cup in Japan
  - (gold) : Japan
  - (silver) : Argentina
  - (bronze) : France
  - 4th: Ivory Coast
- 31 May – 9 June: 2026 Black Sea Tournament in Romania
  - (gold) : Romania
  - (silver) : Turkey
  - (bronze) : Georgia
- 31 May – 13 June: 2026 Maurice Revello Tournament in France
  - (gold) : Portugal
  - (silver) : Tunisia
  - (bronze) : Ivory Coast
  - 4th: DR Congo
- 1–10 June: 2026 Diamond Jubilee International Football Tournament in Maldives
  - (gold) : Pakistan
  - (silver) : Afghanistan
- 3–9 June: 2026 Tri-Nation Series in Philippines
  - (gold) : Philippines
  - (silver) : Myanmar
  - (bronze) : Guam
- 3–9 June: 2026 Four Nations U23 Tournament in Thailand
  - (gold) : United Arab Emirates
  - (silver) : Kyrgyzstan
  - (bronze) : South Korea
  - 4th: Thailand
- 5–9 June: 2026 Tri-Nation Series in Indonesia
  - (gold) : Indonesia
  - (silver) : Oman
  - (bronze) : Mozambique
- 18 September – 3 October: 2026 MSG Prime Minister's Cup – Men's football tournament in Fiji
  - (gold) : Fiji
  - (silver) : Vanuatu
- 23–27 September: 2026 Lafarge Foot Avenir in France
  - (gold) : Japan
  - (silver) : Austria
  - (bronze) : France
  - 4th: Ukraine
- 24–29 September: 2026 Memorial Tournament Stevan Vilotić Ćele in Serbia
  - (gold) : Hungary
  - (silver) : Romania
  - (bronze) : Bulgaria
  - 4th: Serbia
- 24–30 September: 2026 Shenyang Peace Cup in China
  - (gold) : Australia
  - (silver) : Kyrgyzstan
  - (bronze) : China
  - 4th: Vietnam
- 24 September – 3 October: 2026 Friendship Cup in Switzerland
  - (gold) : Spain
  - (silver) : England
  - (bronze) : Brazil
  - 4th: Colombia
- 25–30 September: 2026 Syrenka Cup in Poland
  - (gold) : Poland
  - (silver) : Republic of Ireland
  - (bronze) : Czech Republic
  - 4th: Georgia
- 25 September –: 2026–27 Under 20 Elite League
- 26 September – 6 October: 2026 Istria Youth Cup in Croatia
  - (gold) : Turkey
  - (silver) : Austria
  - (bronze) : Italy
  - 4th: Croatia
- 28 September – 3 October: 2026 Ježek Cup in Czech Republic
  - (gold) : Czech Republic
  - (silver) : Switzerland
  - (bronze) : Greece
  - 4th: Slovakia
- 28 September – 4 October: 2026 Slovenia Nations Cup in Slovenia
- 1–5 October: 2026 Kirin Cup Soccer in Japan
  - (gold) : Japan
  - (silver) : New Zealand
  - (bronze) : Panama
  - 4th: Ecuador
- 1–7 October: 2026 Vertex Cup in England
  - (gold) : Argentina
  - (silver) : Mexico
  - (bronze) : Tanzania
  - 4th: China
- 2–6 October: 2026 Mirabror Usmanov Cup in Uzbekistan
  - (gold) : Russia
  - (silver) : Uzbekistan
  - (bronze) : Saudi Arabia
  - 4th: Armenia
- 27–31 October: 2026 Tournoi du Val-de-Marne in France
  - (gold) : Italy
  - (silver) : France
  - (bronze) : England
  - 4th: Japan
- 10–14 November: 2026 Gia Lai U-23 VTV Cup in Vietnam
- 11–17 November: 2026 Panda Cup in China
- 11–17 November: 2026 Casper Cup in Vietnam
- 13–17 November: 2026 Mizuho Blue Challenge in Singapore
- 14–17 November: 2026 King's Cup in Thailand
- 14–17 November: 2026 Zhaoqing International Football Invitational in China

=== Men's futsal competitions ===
==== FISU ====
- 1 – 7 July: 2026 World University Futsal Championships in Warsaw
  - (gold) : Brazil
  - (silver) : Portugal
  - (bronze) : Poland
  - 4th: Czech Republic
- 17–24 July: 2026 European Universities Games in (Italy) Salerno
  - (gold) : (Croatia) University of Split
  - (silver) : Azerbaijan Sport Academy
  - (bronze) : (Croatia) University of Zagreb
  - 4th: (Spain) University of Seville

==== AFC ====
===== AFF =====
- 5 – 11 April: 2026 ASEAN Futsal Championship in Thailand
  - (gold) : Thailand
  - (silver) : Indonesia
  - (bronze) : Vietnam
  - 4th: Australia

===== SAFF =====
- 14 – 26 January: 2026 SAFF Futsal Championship in Thailand
  - (gold) : Maldives
  - (silver) : India
  - (bronze) : Nepal
  - 4th: Pakistan

==== CAF ====
- 12 – 21 October: 2026 Futsal Africa Cup of Nations in Morocco

==== CONMEBOL ====
- 24 January – 1 February: 2026 Copa América de Futsal in Paraguay
  - (gold) : Brazil
  - (silver) : Argentina
  - (bronze) : Peru
  - 4th: Venezuela
- 11 – 12 April: 2025 CONMEBOL Liga Evolución Futsal in Brazil (Finals)
  - (gold) : Brazil
  - (silver) : Argentina
- 8 – 16 August: 2026 South American U-17 Futsal Championship in Paraguay
  - (gold) : Argentina
  - (silver) : Brazil
  - (bronze) : Venezuela
  - 4th: Paraguay
- 26 September – 4 October: 2026 South American U-20 Futsal Championship in Venezuela
  - (gold) : Brazil
  - (silver) : Venezuela
  - (bronze) : Colombia
  - 4th: Chile

==== UEFA ====
- 21 January – 7 February: UEFA Futsal Euro 2026 in Latvia, Lithuania and Slovenia
  - (gold) : Spain
  - (silver) : Portugal
  - (bronze) : Croatia
  - 4th: France

==== CONIFA ====
- 2 – 6 June: 2026 CONIFA European Football Cup in Italy ( Padania)
  - (gold) : Northern Cyprus
  - (silver) : Padania
  - (bronze) : Greenland
  - 4th: Canton Ticino

==== EMF ====
- 27 May – 4 June: 2026 EMF EURO in Slovakia
  - (gold) : Azerbaijan
  - (silver) : Ukraine

==== World competitions ====
- 22 – 25 January: 2026 Futsal Week January Cup in Croatia
  - (gold) : Morocco
  - (silver) : Romania
  - (bronze) : San Marino
  - 4th: Turkey
- 8 – 12 February: 2026 Perushtitsa Futsal Cup in Bulgaria
  - (gold) : France U21
  - (silver) : Moldova
  - (bronze) : Greece
  - 4th: Bulgaria
- 11 – 12 March: 2026 Futsal Week March Challenge in Croatia
  - (gold) : Moldova
  - (silver) : Montenegro
- 23 – 25 March: 2026 Spring Futsal Cup Under 21 in France
  - (gold) : France U21
  - (silver) : Belgium U21
  - (bronze) : Netherlands U21
- 8 – 13 April: 2026 CFA International Men's Futsal Challenge in China
  - (gold) : Netherlands
  - (silver) : China
  - (bronze) : New Zealand
- 16 – 21 June: 2026 Futsal Week June Cup in Croatia
  - (gold) : Morocco
  - (silver) : Serbia
  - (bronze) : Montenegro
- 23 – 28 June: 2026 Futsal Week U-19 Cup in Croatia
  - (gold) : Spain U-19
  - (silver) : Portugal U-19
  - (bronze) : Morocco U-19
  - 4th: Japan U-19
- 24 – 28 June: 2026 U17 Nations Futsal League in Spain
  - (gold) : Brazil U-17
  - (silver) : Spain U-17
  - (bronze) : France U-17
  - 4th: Portugal U-17
- 1–6 August: 2026 Continental Futsal Championships in Thailand
  - (gold) : Russia
  - (silver) : Vietnam
  - (bronze) : Thailand
  - 4th: Afghanistan
- 11–13 September: 2026 Futsal Week September Cup in Croatia
  - (gold) : Romania
  - (silver) : Estonia
  - (bronze) : Montenegro
- 13–18 October: 2026 Futsal Week October Cup in Croatia
  - (gold) : Morocco U-21
  - (silver) : France U-21
  - (bronze) : San Marino
  - 4th: Switzerland
- 14–18 October: 2026 Copa das Nações de Futsal in Brazil
  - (gold) : Brazil
  - (silver) : Afghanistan
  - (bronze) : Japan
  - 4th: Cape Verde
- 21–24 October: 2026 Montaigu Futsal Cup (U19) in France

=== Men's beach soccer competitions ===
==== EBSL ====
- 23 – 26 April: 2026 U20 Euro Beach Soccer Cup in Italy
  - (gold) : Portugal
  - (silver) : Spain
  - (bronze) : Italy
  - 4th: Czech Republic
- 20 May – 13 September: 2026 Euro Beach Soccer League (final in Viareggio, Italy)
  - (gold) : Spain
  - (silver) : Italy
  - (bronze) : Switzerland
  - 4th: Denmark

==== AFC ====
- 18 – 28 November: 2026 AFC Beach Soccer Asian Cup in Thailand

===== AFF =====
- 21 – 27 September: 2026 ASEAN Beach Soccer Championship in Thailand

===== CONMEBOL =====
- 22 – 30 August: 2026 South American Under-20 Beach Soccer Championship in Peru
  - (gold) : Paraguay
  - (silver) : Brazil
  - (bronze) : Venezuela
  - 4th: Colombia

==== OFC ====
- 22 – 31 October: 2026 OFC Beach Soccer Men's Nations Cup in Tahiti
  - (gold) : Tahiti
  - (silver) : Solomon Islands
  - (bronze) : New Caledonia
  - 4th: Vanuatu

==== World competitions ====
- 2–4 April: 2026 El Salvador Beach Soccer Cup in El Salvador
  - (gold) : Brazil
  - (silver) : Denmark
  - (bronze) : El Salvador
  - 4th: Colombia
- 9–11 April: 2026 Acapulco Beach Soccer Cup in Mexico
  - (gold) : Paraguay
  - (silver) : Portugal
  - (bronze) : United States
  - 4th: Mexico
- 8–10 May: 2026 One Humanity Beach Soccer Cup in Ghana (Postponed)

=== Women's national teams ===
==== FIFA ====
- 9–18 April: 2026 FIFA Series in Brazil, Ivory Coast, Kenya and Thailand
  - Brazil: (gold) : Brazil, (silver) : Canada, (bronze) : South Korea, 4th: Zambia
  - Ivory Coast: (gold) : Ivory Coast, (silver) : Mauritania, (bronze) : Pakistan, 4th: Turks and Caicos Islands
  - Kenya: (gold) : Australia, (silver) : Kenya, (bronze) : India, 4th: Malawi
  - Thailand: (gold) : Thailand, (silver) : DR Congo, (bronze) : Indonesia, 4th: New Caledonia
- 5–27 September: 2026 FIFA U-20 Women's World Cup in Poland
  - (gold) : Spain
  - (silver) : North Korea
  - (bronze) : Colombia
  - 4th: Italy
- 17 October– 7 November: 2026 FIFA U-17 Women's World Cup in Morocco
  - (gold) : Nigeria
  - (silver) : Japan
  - (bronze) : North Korea
  - 4th: Brazil

==== AFC ====
- 1–21 March: 2026 AFC Women's Asian Cup in Australia
  - (gold) : Japan
  - (silver) : Australia
- 1–18 April: 2026 AFC U-20 Women's Asian Cup in Thailand
  - (gold) : Japan
  - (silver) : North Korea
- 30 April – 17 May: 2026 AFC U-17 Women's Asian Cup in China
  - (gold) : North Korea
  - (silver) : Japan
- 14 September – 2 October: Football at the 2026 Asian Games – Women's tournament in Japan
  - (gold) : Japan
  - (silver) : North Korea
  - (bronze) : South Korea
  - 4th: China

===== AFF =====
- 24 February – 2 March: 2026 ASEAN Women's Futsal Championship in Thailand
  - (gold) : Thailand
  - (silver) : Australia
  - (bronze) : Vietnam
  - 4th: Indonesia
- 17–26 July: 2026 AFF Women's Cup in Malaysia
  - (gold) : Indonesia
  - (silver) : Laos
  - (bronze) : Singapore
  - 4th: Cambodia
- 22–28 December: 2026 ASEAN U-16 Women's Championship in Thailand
- 22–28 December: 2026 ASEAN U-19 Women's Championship in Thailand

===== SAFF =====
- 31 January – 7 February: 2026 SAFF U-19 Women's Championship in Nepal
  - (gold) : India
  - (silver) : Bangladesh
- 25 May – 6 June: 2026 SAFF Women's Championship in India
  - (gold) : India
  - (silver) : Bangladesh

===== WAFF =====
- 17–25 July: 2026 WAFF U-17 Women's Championship in Jordan
  - (gold) : Syria
  - (silver) : Lebanon

===== CAFA =====
- 21–25 July: 2026 CAFA U-20 Women's Championship in Tajikistan
  - (gold) : Uzbekistan
  - (silver) : Iran
  - (bronze) : Kyrgyzstan
  - 4th: Tajikistan
- 15–19 September: 2026 CAFA U-17 Women's Championship in Uzbekistan
  - (gold) : Kyrgyzstan
  - (silver) : Iran
  - (bronze) : Uzbekistan
  - 4th: Tajikistan

==== CAF ====
- 2–10 April: 2026 CAF African Schools Football Championship in Zimbabwe
  - (gold) : Ghana
  - (silver) : Burkina Faso
  - (bronze) : Zambia
  - 4th: Morocco
- 26 July – 16 August: 2026 Women's Africa Cup of Nations in Morocco
  - (gold) : Cameroon
  - (silver) : Malawi
  - (bronze) : Algeria
  - 4th: Morocco

===== CECAFA =====
- 13–23 June: 2026 CECAFA Women's U-17 Championship in Tanzania
  - (gold) : Uganda
  - (silver) : Tanzania
  - (bronze) : Kenya
  - 4th: South Sudan

===== COSAFA =====
- 18 February – 1 March: 2026 COSAFA Women's Championship in South Africa
  - (gold) : Namibia
  - (silver) : South Africa
  - (bronze) : Zambia
  - 4th: Zimbabwe

===== WAFU =====
- 1–20 May: 2026 WAFU Zone A U20 Women's Cup in Guinea-Bissau
  - (gold) : Senegal
  - (silver) : Liberia
  - (bronze) : Gambia
  - 4th: Mali

===== UNAF =====
- 18–22 July: 2026 UNAF U-17 Women's Tournament in Tunisia
  - (gold) : Morocco
  - (silver) : Tunisia
  - (bronze) : Botswana
  - 4th: Libya

==== CONCACAF ====
- 17 - 22 March: 2026 CONCACAF U-17 Women's World Cup qualification – Final round
  - Qualified Teams: Canada, Mexico, Puerto Rico and United States
- 27 November - 5 December: 2026 CONCACAF W Championship in United States

==== CONMEBOL ====
- 4–28 February: 2026 South American Under-20 Women's Football Championship in Paraguay
  - (gold) : Brazil
  - (silver) : Ecuador
  - (bronze) : Argentina
  - 4th: Colombia
- 24 April – 9 May: 2026 South American Under-17 Women's Football Championship in Paraguay
  - (gold) : Brazil
  - (silver) : Argentina
- 8–20 September: 2026 CONMEBOL Girls' U-15 Evolution League in Paraguay
  - (gold) : Venezuela
  - (silver) : Paraguay
  - (bronze) : Chile
  - 4th: Colombia
- 16–23 September: Football at the 2026 South American Games in Argentina
  - (gold) : Venezuela
  - (silver) : Chile
  - (bronze) : Uruguay
  - 4th: Paraguay

==== OFC ====
- 6–19 September: 2026 OFC U-16 Women's Championship in Solomon Islands
  - (gold) : New Zealand
  - (silver) : New Caledonia
  - (bronze) : Fiji
  - 4th: Papua New Guinea

==== UEFA ====
- 3–16 May: 2026 UEFA Women's Under-17 Championship in Northern Ireland
  - (gold) : Germany
  - (silver) : France
- 27 June – 10 July: 2026 UEFA Women's Under-19 Championship in Bosnia and Herzegovina
  - (gold) : Spain
  - (silver) : Germany

==== World competitions ====
- 9–14 February: 2026 MIMA Cup in Spain
  - (gold) : United States
  - (silver) : England
  - (bronze) : Norway
  - 4th: Morocco
- 28 February – 6 March: 2026 Bee Girls Trophy in Turkey
  - (gold) : Russia
  - (silver) : Thailand
- 28 February – 6 March: 2026 Pink Ladies Cup in United Arab Emirates (not finished)
  - (gold) : Ghana
  - (silver) : Russia
  - (bronze) : Tanzania
  - 4th: Hong Kong
- 28 February – 6 March: 2026 Pinatar Cup in Spain
  - (gold) : United States
  - (silver) : Hungary
  - (bronze) : Sweden
- 1–7 March: 2026 SheBelieves Cup in United States
  - (gold) : United States
  - (silver) : Canada
  - (bronze) : Colombia
  - 4th: Argentina
- 8–17 April: 2026 Women's UEFA Friendship Cup in Turkey
  - (gold) : Paraguay
  - (silver) : Norway
  - (bronze) : Turkey
  - 4th: Ethiopia
- 12–16 April: 2026 Women's Three Nations Tournament in Tunisia
  - (gold) : Tunisia
  - (silver) : Benin
  - (bronze) : Comoros
- 12–17 April: 2026 WU23 Friendly Finals in Spain
  - (gold) : England
  - (silver) : Sweden
  - (bronze) : Netherlands
  - 4th: Norway
- 3–9 June: 2026 AYA Bank Tri-Nations Cup in Myanmar
  - (gold) : Thailand
  - (silver) : Uzbekistan
  - (bronze) : Myanmar
- 3–9 June: 2026 Women's Three Nations Tournament in Indonesia
  - (gold) : Cambodia
  - (silver) : Singapore
  - (bronze) : Indonesia
- 3–9 June: 2026 Women's Three Nations Tournament in Jordan
- 3–9 June: 2026 Women's Three Nations U20 Tournament in Spain
  - (gold) : Japan
  - (silver) : England
  - (bronze) : Canada
- 3–12 June: 2026 Women's Four Nations U23 Tournament in Portugal
- 6–9 June: 2026 Zambia Women's Four Nations Tournament in Zambia
  - (gold) : Zambia
  - (silver) : Zimbabwe
  - (bronze) : Kenya
  - 4th: Lesotho
- 14–23 August: Srikandi Merdeka Cup in Malaysia
  - (gold) : Thailand
  - (silver) : Indonesia
  - (bronze) : Malaysia
  - 4th: Jordan
- 17 September – 3 October: 2026 MSG Prime Minister's Cup – Women's tournament in Fiji
  - (gold) : Vanuatu
  - (silver) : Papua New Guinea
- 4–10 November: 2026 TAIFF Friendly Tournament in Gabon
  - (gold) : Chad
  - (silver) : Congo
  - (bronze) : Central African Republic
  - 4th: (Gabon) Sporting Club Nyanga
- 9–15 November: 2026 UNCAF Women's U-19 Tournament in Panama

=== Women's futsal competitions ===
==== FISU ====
- 1–7 July: 2026 World University Futsal Championships in Warsaw
  - (gold) : Brazil
  - (silver) : Portugal
  - (bronze) : Poland
  - 4th: Germany
- 17–24 July: 2026 European Universities Games in (Italy) Salerno
  - (gold) : (Croatia) University of Zagreb
  - (silver) : (Portugal) University of Aveiro
  - (bronze) : (Poland) Adam Mickiewicz University
  - 4th: (Spain) University of Barcelona

==== CAFA ====
- 23–27 June: 2026 CAFA Women's Futsal Championship in Tajikistan
  - (gold) : Iran
  - (silver) : Kyrgyzstan
  - (bronze) : Tajikistan

===== SAFF =====
- 13–25 January: 2026 SAFF Women's Futsal Championship in Thailand
  - (gold) : Bangladesh
  - (silver) : India
  - (bronze) : Bhutan
  - 4th: Nepal

==== CONMEBOL ====
- 12–20 September: 2026 CONMEBOL U-20 Women's Futsal Championship Venezuela
  - (gold) : Brazil
  - (silver) : Venezuela
  - (bronze) : Argentina
  - 4th: Colombia

==== World competitions ====
- 16–19 February: 2026 Futsal Week Women's February Cup in Croatia
  - (gold) : Spain
  - (silver) : Croatia
  - (bronze) : Hungary
  - 4th: Norway
- 8–12 April: 2026 CFA International Women's Futsal Challenge in China
  - (gold) : New Zealand
  - (silver) : China
- 16–21 June: 2026 Futsal Week Women's June Cup in Croatia
  - (gold) : Italy
  - (silver) : Croatia
  - (bronze) : Poland
  - 4th: Czech Republic

=== Women's beach soccer competitions ===
==== Women's Euro Beach Soccer League ====
- 20 May – 13 September 2026 Women's Euro Beach Soccer League (final in Viareggio, Italy)
  - (gold) : Spain
  - (silver) : Italy
  - (bronze) : Portugal
  - 4th: Ukraine

==== World competitions ====
- 2–4 April: 2026 El Salvador Beach Soccer Cup in El Salvador
  - (gold) : El Salvador
  - (silver) : Portugal
  - (bronze) : Brazil
  - 4th: Mexico
- 9–11 April: 2026 Acapulco Beach Soccer Cup in Mexico
  - (gold) : United States
  - (silver) : Brazil
  - (bronze) : Japan
  - 4th: Mexico

== Club continental champions ==
=== Men ===
Region	Tournament	Defending champion	Champion	Title	Last honour
AFC (Asia)	2025–26 AFC Champions League Elite	(Saudi Arabia) Al-Ahli	(Saudi Arabia) Al-Ahli	2nd	2024–25
AFC (Asia)	2025–26 AFC Champions League Two	(United Arab Emirates) Sharjah	(Japan) Gamba Osaka	1st	—N/a
AFC (Asia)	2025–26 AFC Challenge League	(Turkmenistan) Arkadag	Al Kuwait	1st	—N/a
AFC (Asia)	2025–26 ASEAN Club Championship	(Thailand) Buriram United	(Thailand) Buriram United	2nd	2024–25
CAF (Africa)	2025–26 CAF Champions League	(Egypt) Pyramids	(South Africa) Mamelodi Sundowns	2nd	2016
CAF (Africa)	2025–26 CAF Confederation Cup	(Morocco) RS Berkane	(Algeria) USM Alger	2nd	2022–23
CAF (Africa)	2026 CAF Super Cup	(Egypt) Pyramids	(Algeria) USM Alger	2nd	2023
CECAFA	2026 Kagame Interclub Cup	(Tanzania) Singida Black Stars	(Rwanda) Rayon Sports	2nd	1988
CONCACAF (North and Central America, Caribbean)	2026 CONCACAF Champions Cup	(Mexico) Cruz Azul	(Mexico) Deportivo Toluca	3rd	2003
CONCACAF (North and Central America, Caribbean)	2026 Leagues Cup	(United States) Seattle Sounders	(Mexico) Deportivo Toluca	1st	—N/a
CONCACAF (North and Central America, Caribbean)	2026 Campeones Cup	(Mexico) Deportivo Toluca	(United States) Inter Miami	1st	—N/a
CONCACAF (North and Central America, Caribbean)	2026 CONCACAF Central American Cup	(Costa Rica) Alajuelense	(Costa Rica)		
CONCACAF (North and Central America, Caribbean)	2026 CONCACAF Caribbean Cup	(Jamaica) Cavalier	(Jamaica)		
CONCACAF (North and Central America, Caribbean)	2026 CFU Club Shield	(Dominican Republic) Moca	(Jamaica) Mount Pleasant	1st	—N/a
CONMEBOL (South America)	2026 Copa Libertadores	(Brazil) Flamengo			
CONMEBOL (South America)	2026 Copa Sudamericana	(Argentina) Lanús	(Argentina) Boca Juniors	3rd	2005
CONMEBOL (South America)	2026 Recopa Sudamericana	(Argentina) Racing	(Argentina) Lanús	1st	—N/a
CONMEBOL (South America)	2026 U-20 Copa Libertadores	(Brazil) Flamengo	(Chile) Santiago Wanderers	1st	—N/a
CONMEBOL (South America)	2026 Copa Libertadores de Futsal	(Uruguay) Penarol	(Brazil) Carlos Barbosa	7th	2019
OFC (Oceania)	2026 OFC Professional League	First edition	(New Zealand) Auckland FC	1st	—N/a
OFC (Oceania)	2026 OFC Champions League	(New Zealand) Auckland City	(New Zealand) Auckland City	14th	2025
UEFA (Europe)	2025–26 UEFA Champions League	(France) Paris Saint-Germain	(France) Paris Saint-Germain	2nd	2024–25
UEFA (Europe)	2025–26 UEFA Europa League	(England) Tottenham Hotspur	(England) Aston Villa	1st	—N/a
UEFA (Europe)	2025–26 UEFA Conference League	(England) Chelsea	(England) Crystal Palace	1st	—N/a
UEFA (Europe)	2026 UEFA Super Cup	(France) Paris Saint-Germain	(France) Paris Saint-Germain	2nd	2025
UEFA (Europe)	2025–26 UEFA Youth League	(Spain) Barcelona	(Spain) Real Madrid	2nd	2019–20
UEFA (Europe)	2025–26 UEFA Futsal Champions League	(Spain) Palma Futsal	(Portugal) Sporting CP	3rd	2020–21
UAFA (Arab States)	2025–26 AGCFF Gulf Club Champions League	(Iraq) Duhok	(Qatar) Al-Rayyan	1st	—N/a
UAFA (Arab States)	2026 GFF Gulf Club Super Cup	First edition			
FIFA (Global)	2026 FIFA Intercontinental Cup	(France) Paris Saint-Germain			
FIFA (Global)	2026 Challenger Cup	(Brazil) Flamengo			
FIFA (Global)	2026 Derby of the Americas	(Brazil) Flamengo			
FIFA (Global)	2026 African–Asian–Pacific Cup	(Egypt) Pyramids	(South Africa) Mamelodi Sundowns	1st	—N/a
FIFA (Global)	2026 Under-20 Intercontinental Cup	(Brazil) Flamengo	(Spain) Real Madrid	1st	—N/a
FIFA (Global)	2026 Intercontinental Futsal Cup	(Spain) Palma Futsal	(Portugal) Sporting CP	1st	—N/a

=== Women ===
Region	Tournament	Defending champion	Champion	Title	Last honour
AFC (Asia)	2025–26 AFC Women's Champions League	(China) Wuhan Jiangda	(North Korea) Naegohyang Women's	1st	—N/a
WAFF (Asia)	2026 WAFF Women's Clubs Championship	(Lebanon) Safa	(Saudi Arabia) Al-Nassr	1st	—N/a
CAF (Africa)	2026 CAF Women's Champions League	(Morocco) AS FAR	(Morocco) AS FAR	3rd	2025
UNAF (Africa)	2026 UNAF Women's Champions League	(Morocco) AS FAR	(Morocco) FUS Rabat	1st	—N/a
COSAFA (Africa)	2026 COSAFA Women's Champions League	(Botswana) Gaborone United Ladies	(South Africa) Mamelodi Sundowns Ladies	3rd	2023
CECAFA (Africa)	2026 CECAFA Women's Champions League	(Tanzania) JKT Queens	(Uganda) Kawempe Muslim Ladies	1st	—N/a
UNIFFAC (Africa)	2026 UNIFFAC Women's Champions League	(Equatorial Guinea) 15 de Agosto Femenino	(Cameroon) Lekié FF	1st	—N/a
WAFU A (Africa)	2026 WAFU Zone A Women's Champions League	(Mali) USFAS Bamako	(Mali) USFAS Bamako	2nd	2025
WAFU B (Africa)	2026 WAFU Zone B Women's Champions League	(Ivory Coast) ASEC Mimosas	(Nigeria) Edo Queens	2nd	2024
CONCACAF (North and Central America, Caribbean)	2025–26 CONCACAF W Champions Cup	(United States) Gotham FC	(Mexico) Club América	1st	—N/a
CONMEBOL (South America)	2026 Copa Libertadores Femenina	(Brazil) Corinthians	(Brazil) Cruzeiro	1st	—N/a
CONMEBOL (South America)	2026 Copa Libertadores de Futsal Femenina	(Brazil) Taboão Magnus			
OFC (Oceania)	2026 OFC Women's Champions League	(New Zealand) Auckland United	(New Zealand) Auckland United	3rd	2025
UEFA (Europe)	2025–26 UEFA Women's Champions League	(England) Arsenal	(Spain) Barcelona	4th	2023–24
UEFA (Europe)	2025–26 UEFA Women's Europa Cup	First edition	(Sweden) BK Häcken FF	1st	—N/a
FIFA (Global)	2026 FIFA Women's Champions Cup	First edition	(England) Arsenal	1st	—N/a

== Men's national leagues ==
=== AFC ===
Nation	League	Champion	Second place	Title	Last honour
Afghanistan	2025–26 Afghanistan Champions League	Abu Muslim	Sorkh Poshan	2nd	2024–25
Australia	2025–26 A-League Men	Auckland FC	Sydney FC	1st	—N/a
Bahrain	2025–26 Bahraini Premier League	Al-Muharraq	Al-Khaldiya	36th	2024–25
Bangladesh	2025–26 Bangladesh Football League	Bashundhara Kings	Dhaka Abahani	6th	2023-24
Bhutan	2026 Bhutan Premier League	TBD – competition in progress			
Brunei	2025–26 Brunei Super League	Indera SC	Kasuka FC	3rd	2014
Cambodia	2025–26 Cambodian Premier League	Svay Rieng	Phnom Penh Crown	5th	2024–25
China	2026 Chinese Super League	TBD – competition in progress			
Guam	2026 Guam Soccer League	TBD – competition in progress			
Hong Kong	2025–26 Hong Kong Premier League	Kitchee	Tai Po	7th	2022–23
India	2025–26 Indian Super League	East Bengal	Mohun Bagan	4th	2003-04
Indonesia	2025–26 Super League	Persib Bandung	Borneo Samarinda	10th	2024–25
Iran	2025–26 Persian Gulf Pro League	League suspended due to the 2026 Iran war.			
Iraq	2025–26 Iraq Stars League	Al-Quwa Al-Jawiya	Al-Shorta	8th	2020–21
Japan	J1 100 Year Vision League	Vissel Kobe	Kashima Antlers	1st	—N/a
Jordan	2025–26 Jordanian Pro League	Al-Hussein	Al-Faisaly	3rd	2024–25
Kuwait	2025–26 Kuwaiti Premier League	Kuwait	Al Arabi	21st	2024–25
Kyrgyzstan	2026 Kyrgyz Premier League	TBD – competition in progress			
Laos	2025–26 Lao League 1	Ezra	Young Elephants	2nd	2024–25
Lebanon	2025–26 Lebanese Premier League	Al Ansar	Nejmeh	16th	2024–25
Macau	2026 Liga de Elite	Shao Jiang	MUST IPO	1st	—N/a
Malaysia	2025–26 Malaysia Super League	Johor Darul Ta'zim	Kuching City	12th	2024–25
Maldives	2025-26 Dhivehi Premier League	Maziya	Odi Sports Club	6th	2023
Mongolia	2025–26 Mongolian Premier League	FC Ulaanbaatar	Central Stallions FC	3rd	2022-23
Myanmar	2025–26 Myanmar National League	Shan United	Yangon United	7th	2024–25
Northern Mariana Islands	2026 Marianas Soccer League 1 Spring	Season interrupted due to damage done by Typhoon Sinlaku			
Nepal	2026 ANFA National League	Abandoned due to the ANFA-NSC crisis and FIFA suspension			
North Korea	2025–26 Premier Football League	TBD – competition in progress			
Oman	2025–26 Oman Professional League	Al-Seeb	Al-Shabab SC	5th	2024–25
Palestine	2025–26 West Bank Premier League	Not disputed due to Gaza war			
Palestine	2025–26 Gaza Strip Premier League	Not disputed due to Gaza war			
Pakistan	2025–26 Pakistan Premier League	Not disputed			
Philippines	2025–26 Philippines Football League	Manila Digger	One Taguig	1st	—N/a
Qatar	2025–26 Qatar Stars League	Al Sadd	Al-Shamal	19th	2024–25
Saudi Arabia	2025–26 Saudi Pro League	Al-Nassr	Al Hilal	11th	2018–19
Singapore	2025–26 Singapore Premier League	Lion City Sailors FC	Tampines Rovers FC	5th	2024–25
South Korea	2026 K League 1	TBD – competition in progress			
Sri Lanka	2026 Sri Lanka Super League	TBD – competition in progress			
Syria	2025–26 Syrian Premier League	Al Ittihad Ahli	Homs Al Fidaa	8th	2024–25
(Chinese Taipei) Taiwan	2025–26 Taiwan Football Premier League	Tainan City	Hang Yuan	6th	2024
Tajikistan	2026 Tajikistan Higher League	TBD – competition in progress			
Thailand	2025–26 Thai League 1	Buriram United	Port FC	12th	2024–25
Timor-Leste	2026 Liga Futebol Timor-Leste	Benfica Laulara	Santa Cruz	2nd	2016
Turkmenistan	2026 Ýokary Liga	TBD – competition in progress			
United Arab Emirates	2025–26 UAE Pro League	Al Ain	Shabab Al Ahli	15th	2021–22
Uzbekistan	2026 Uzbekistan Super League	TBD – competition in progress			
Vietnam	2025–26 V.League 1	Công An Hà Nội	Thể Công–Viettel	3rd	2023
Yemen	2025–26 Yemeni League	TBD – competition in progress			

=== CAF ===
Nation	League	Champion	Second place	Title	Last honour
Algeria	2025–26 Algerian Ligue Professionnelle 1	MC Alger	JS Saoura	10th	2024–25
Angola	2025–26 Girabola	Petró de Luanda	Wiliete	20th	2024–25
Benin	2025–26 Benin Premier League	Sobemap FC	Coton FC	1st	—N/a
Botswana	2025–26 Botswana Premier League	Gaborone United	Jwaneng Galaxy	9th	2021–22
Burkina Faso	2025–26 Burkinabé Premier League	Rahimo	USFA	3rd	2024–25
Burundi	2025–26 Burundi Ligue A	Aigle Noir Makamba	Musongati	3rd	2024–25
Cameroon	2025–26 Elite One	Colombe Sportive	Dynamo Douala	2nd	2024–25
Cape Verde	2025-26 Cape Verdean Football Championships	GD Palmeira	Mindelense	3rd	2024–25
Central African Republic	2025–26 Central African Republic League	Not disputed			
Chad	2025-26 Chad Premier League	AS PSI	Aiglons FC	1st	—N/a
Comoros	2025–26 Comoros Premier League	Fomboni FC	Volcan Club	4th	2019
(Republic of the Congo) Congo	2025–26 Congo Ligue 1	Not disputed due to FECOFOOT crisis			
(Democratic Republic of the Congo) DR Congo	2025–26 Linafoot	TP Mazembe	Aigles du Congo	21th	2023-24
Djibouti	2025–26 Djibouti Premier League	AS Port	ASAS Djibouti Télécom	5th	2018-19
Equatorial Guinea	2025–26 Equatoguinean Primera División	FC 15 de Agosto	Malabo United	1st	—N/a
Eritrea	2026 Eritrean Premier League	FC Al Tahrir	Red Sea FC	3rd	2007
Egypt	2025–26 Egyptian Premier League	Zamalek	Pyramids FC	15th	2021–22
Eswatini	2025–26 Premier League of Eswatini	Nsingizini Hotspurs	Manzini Sea Birds	2nd	2024–25
Ethiopia	2025–26 Ethiopian Premier League	Sidama Coffee	Negele Arsi Town	1st	—N/a
Gabon	2025-26 Gabon National Foot 1	AS Mangasport	AS Stade Mandji	11th	2024-25
(The Gambia) Gambia	2025–26 GFA League First Division	Medina United	Fortune FC	1st	—N/a
Ghana	2025–26 Ghana Premier League	Medeama SC	Bibiani Gold Stars	2nd	2022–23
Guinea	2025–26 Guinée Championnat National	Horoya	Hafia	22nd	2021–22
Guinea-Bissau	2025–26 Campeonato Nacional da Guiné-Bissau	FC Canchungo	Portos de Bissau	2nd	2022–23
Ivory Coast	2025–26 Ligue 1	ASEC Mimosas	FC San Pédro	30th	2022–23
Kenya	2025–26 Kenyan Premier League	Gor Mahia	Leopards	22nd	2022–23
Lesotho	2025–26 Lesotho Premier League	Lijabatho	Lifofane	1st	—N/a
Liberia	2025–26 LFA First Division	Watanga FC	FC Bea Mountain	3rd	2023-24
Libya	2025–26 Libyan Premier League	Asswehly SC	Al Nasr Benghazi	1st	—N/a
Madagascar	2025–26 Malagasy Pro League	CFFA	AJESAIA	2nd	2021-22
Malawi	2026 Super League of Malawi	Mighty Wanderers	Silver Strikers	8th	2025
Mali	2025–26 Malian Première Division	Djoliba AC	Stade Malien	25th	2023-24
Mauritania	2025–26 Ligue 1 Mauritania	FC Nouadhibou	N'Zidane	14th	2024–25
Mauritius	2025–26 Mauritian Premier League	La Cure Waves	Pamplemousses SC	1st	—N/a
Morocco	2025–26 Botola Pro	Maghreb Fez	RS Berkane	5th	1983–84
Mozambique	2026 Moçambola	TBD – competition in progress			
Namibia	2025–26 Namibia Premiership	African Stars	Eeshoke Chula Chula	9th	2024–25
Niger	2025–26 Super Ligue	ASN Nigelec	US Gendarmerie Nationale	2nd	2021–22
Nigeria	2025–26 Nigeria Premier Football League	Enugu Rangers	Rivers United	9th	2023-24
Réunion	2025 Régionale 1 Réunion	TBD – competition in progress			
Rwanda	2025–26 Rwanda Premier League	APR F.C.	Rayon Sports	24th	2024-25
São Tomé and Príncipe	2026 São Tomé and Príncipe Championship	TBD – competition in progress			
Senegal	2025–26 Senegal Ligue 1	Teungueth	AJEL Rufisque	3rd	2023–24
Seychelles	2025–26 Seychelles Premier League	Foresters Mont Fleuri	Côte d'Or FC	3rd	2022–23
Sierra Leone	2025–26 Sierra Leone National Premier League	Bo Rangers	Star Sports	4th	2023–24
Somalia	2025–26 Somali First Division	Gaadiidka FC	Heegan FC	3rd	2022
South Africa	2025–26 South African Premiership	Orlando Pirates	Mamelodi Sundowns	5th	2011–12
South Sudan	2026 South Sudan Football Championship	El Merriekh	Jamus SC	1st	—N/a
Sudan	2025–26 Sudan Premier League	Al Merrikh SC	Al Hilal (Omdurman)	20th	2019-20
Tanzania	2025–26 Tanzanian Premier League	Young Africans	Simba	28th	2024-25
Togo	2025–26 Togolese Championnat National	ASC Kara	ASKO Kara	3rd	2024-25
Tunisia	2025–26 Tunisian Ligue Professionnelle 1	Club Africain	Espérance de Tunis	13th	2014–15
Uganda	2025–26 Uganda Premier League	Vipers	KCCA	8th	2024–25
Zambia	2025–26 Zambia Super League	Power Dynamos	Red Arrows	9th	2024–25
Zanzibar	2025–26 Zanzibar Premier League	KVX	JKU S.C.	1st	—N/a
Zimbabwe	2026 Zimbabwe Premier Soccer League	TBD – competition in progress			

=== CONCACAF ===
Nation	League	Champion	Second place	Title	Last honour
Anguilla	2026 AFA Senior Male League	TBD – competition in progress			
Antigua and Barbuda	2025–26 Antigua and Barbuda Premier Division	Grenades	All Saints United	2nd	2022–23
Aruba	2025–26 Aruban Division di Honor	TBD – competition in progress			
The Bahamas	2025–26 BFA Senior League	University of the Bahamas	Renegades FC	2nd	2017–18
Barbados	2026 Barbados Premier League	TBD – competition in progress			
Belize	2026 Closing Searon	TBD – competition in progress			
Belize	2026 Opening Season	Competition yet to start			
Bermuda	2025–26 Bermudian Premier Division	Dandy Town Hornets	Devonshire Colts	10th	2021–22
Bonaire	2025–26 Bonaire League	TBD – competition in progress			
British Virgin Islands	2025–26 BVIFA National Football League	Lion Heart FC	Islanders FC	1st	—N/a
Canada	2026 Canadian Premier League	Cavalry FC	Atlético Ottawa	2nd	2024
Cayman Islands	2025–26 Cayman Islands Premier League	TBD – competition in progress			
Costa Rica	2026 Liga FPD Clausura	Herediano	Deportivo Saprissa	32nd	Clausura 2025
Costa Rica	2026 Liga FPD Apertura	TBD – competition in progress			
Cuba	2026 Campeonato Nacional de Fútbol de Cuba	Competition yet to start			
Curaçao	2026 Curaçao Promé Divishon	TBD – competition in progress			
Dominica	2026 Dominica Premier League	TBD – competition in progress			
Dominican Republic	2025–26 Liga Dominicana de Fútbol	Salcedo FC	Cibao FC	1st	—N/a
El Salvador	2026 Torneo Clausura	FAS	Águila	20th	Apertura 2022
El Salvador	2026 Torneo Apertura	Competition yet to start			
French Guiana	2025–26 French Guiana Régional 1	TBD – competition in progress			
Grenada	2026 GFA Premier League	TBD – competition in progress			
Guadeloupe	2025–26 Guadeloupe Division of Honor	ASC Siroco Les Abymes	CS Moulien	2nd	1984-85
Guatemala	2026 Liga Nacional Clausura	Municipal	Xelajú	33rd	Clausura 2024
Guatemala	2026 Liga Nacional Apertura	Competition yet to start			
Guyana	2026 GFF Elite League	TBD – competition in progress			
Haiti	2026 D1 Special Championship	Violette	Baltimore	9th	2020–21 O
Honduras	2026 Liga Nacional Clausura	Motagua	Marathón	20th	2024 Apertura
Honduras	2026 Liga Nacional Apertura	Competition yet to start			
Jamaica	2025–26 Jamaica Premier League	Portmore United	Cavalier	8th	2018–19
Martinique	2025–26 Martinique Championnat National	TBD – competition in progress			
Mexico	2026 Liga MX Clausura	Cruz Azul	Pumas UNAM	10th	Guard1anes 2021
Mexico	2026 Liga MX Apertura	TBD – competition starts in July			
Montserrat	2025–26 Montserrat Championship	Not held			
Nicaragua	2026 Liga Primera Clausura	Real Estelí	Diriangén FC	22nd	2023 Clausura
Nicaragua	2026 Liga Primera Apertura	TBD – competition in progress			
Panama	2026 Liga Panameña Clausura	Plaza Amador	Alianza	10th	2025 Clausura
Panama	2026 Liga Panameña Apertura	Competition yet to start			
Puerto Rico	2026 Liga Puerto Rico	TBD – competition in progress			
Saint Kitts and Nevis	2026 SKNFA Premier League	United Old Road Jets FC	St. Peters Strikers FC	1st	—N/a
Saint Lucia	2026 Saint Lucia Premier League	TBD – competition in progress			
(Collectivity of Saint Martin) Saint Martin	2025–26 Saint-Martin Senior League	TBD – competition in progress			
Saint Vincent and the Grenadines	2026 Vincy Soccer Premier League	TBD – competition in progress			
Sint Maarten	2025–26 Sint Maarten Premier League	SCSA Eagles	758 Boyz SC	5th	2024-25
Suriname	2025-26 Suriname Major League	Broki	Robinhood	1st	—N/a
Trinidad and Tobago	2025–26 TT Premier Football League	Defence Force	Club Sando	26th	2024-25
(Turks and Caicos Islands) Turks and Caicos	2025–26 Provo Premier League	Academy Eagles	SWA Sharks FC	8th	2023-24
United States	2026 Major League Soccer season	TBD – competition in progress			
(United States Virgin Islands) US Virgin Islands	2026 USVISF Premier League season	Competition starting in June			

=== CONMEBOL ===
Nation	League	Champion	Second place	Title	Last honour
Argentina	2026 Liga Profesional Apertura	Belgrano	River Plate	1st	—N/a
Argentina	2026 Liga Profesional Clausura	TBD – competition in progress			
Bolivia	2026 División Profesional	TBD – competition in progress			
Brazil	2026 Campeonato Brasileiro Série A	Flamengo	Palmeiras	9th	2025
Chile	2026 Liga de Primera	Colo-Colo		35th	2024
Colombia	2026 Liga DIMAYOR Apertura	Junior	Atlético Nacional	12th	2025 Finalización
Colombia	2026 Liga DIMAYOR Finalización	TBD – competition in progress			
Ecuador	2026 LigaPro Serie A	Independiente del Valle		3rd	2025
Paraguay	2026 Copa de Primera Apertura	Olimpia	Nacional	48th	2024 Clausura
Paraguay	2026 Copa de Primera Clausura	Olimpia		49th	2026 Apertura
Peru	2026 Liga 1	TBD – competition in progress			
Uruguay	2026 Liga AUF Uruguaya	TBD – competition in progress			
Venezuela	2026 Liga FUTVE	TBD – competition in progress			

=== OFC ===
Nation	League	Champion	Second place	Title	Last honour
American Samoa	2026 FFAS Senior League	TBD – competition in progress			
Cook Islands	2026 Cook Islands Round Cup	TBD – competition in progress			
Fiji	2026 Fiji Premier League	TBD – competition in progress			
Kiribati	2026 Kiribati National Championship	TBD – competition in progress			
Kiribati	2026 Kiribati Champions League	TBD – competition in progress			
New Caledonia	2026 New Caledonia Super Ligue	TBD – competition in progress			
New Zealand	2026 New Zealand National League	TBD – competition in progress			
Papua New Guinea	2026 Papua New Guinea Premier Soccer League	TBD – competition in progress			
Samoa	2026 Samoa National League	TBD – competition in progress			
Solomon Islands	2026 S-League	TBD – competition in progress			
(French Polynesia) Tahiti	2025–26 Tahiti Ligue 1	TBD – competition in progress			
Tonga	2026 Tonga Major League	TBD – competition in progress			
Tuvalu	2026 Tuvalu A-Division	Nauti	Lakena United	27th	2023
Vanuatu	2026 VFF Champions League	TBD – competition in progress			

=== UEFA ===
Nation	League	Champion	Second place	Title	Last honour
Albania	2025–26 Kategoria Superiore	Egnatia	Elbasani	3rd	2024–25
Andorra	2025–26 Primera Divisió	Inter Club d'Escaldes	UE Santa Coloma	5th	2024–25
Armenia	2025–26 Armenian Premier League	Ararat-Armenia	Noah	3rd	2019–20
Austria	2025–26 Austrian Football Bundesliga	LASK	Sturm Graz	2nd	1964–65
Azerbaijan	2025–26 Azerbaijan Premier League	Sabah	Qarabağ	1st	—N/a
Belarus	2026 Belarusian Premier League	TBD – competition in progress			
Belgium	2025–26 Belgian Pro League	Club Brugge	Union SG	20th	2023–24
Bosnia and Herzegovina	2025–26 Premier League of Bosnia and Herzegovina	Borac Banja Luka	Zrinjski Mostar	4th	2023–24
Bulgaria	2025–26 First Professional Football League	Levski Sofia	1948 Sofia	27th	2008–09
Croatia	2025–26 Croatian Football League	Dinamo Zagreb	Hajduk Split	26th	2023–24
Cyprus	2025–26 Cypriot First Division	Omonia	AEK Larnaca	22nd	2020–21
Czech Republic	2025–26 Czech First League	Slavia Prague	Sparta Prague	22nd	2024–25
Denmark	2025–26 Danish Superliga	AGF	Midtjylland	6th	1986
England	2025–26 Premier League	Arsenal	Manchester City	14th	2003–04
Estonia	2026 Meistriliiga	Levadia	Paide Linnameeskond	12th	2024
Faroe Islands	2026 Faroe Islands Premier League	NSÍ	KÍ	2nd	2007
Finland	2026 Veikkausliiga	Inter Turku	HJK	2nd	2008
France	2025–26 Ligue 1	Paris Saint-Germain	Lens	14th	2024–25
(Georgia (country)) Georgia	2026 Erovnuli Liga	TBD – competition in progress			
Germany	2025–26 Bundesliga	Bayern Munich	Borussia Dortmund	35th	2024–25
Gibraltar	2025–26 Gibraltar Football League	Lincoln Red Imps	St Joseph's	30th	2024–25
Greece	2025–26 Super League Greece	AEK Athens	Olympiacos	14th	2022–23
Hungary	2025–26 Nemzeti Bajnokság I	Győri ETO	Ferencváros	5th	2012–13
Iceland	2026 Besta deild karla	Víkingur Reykjavík	KR	9th	2025
Israel	2025–26 Israeli Premier League	Hapoel Be'er Sheva	Beitar Jerusalem	6th	2017–18
Italy	2025–26 Serie A	Inter Milan	Napoli	21st	2023–24
Kazakhstan	2026 Kazakhstan Premier League	Ordabasy	Kairat	2nd	2023
Kosovo	2025–26 Football Superleague of Kosovo	Drita	Malisheva	5th	2024–25
Latvia	2026 Latvian Higher League	RFS	Riga	4th	2024
Lithuania	2026 TOPLYGA	Kauno Žalgiris	Sūduva	2nd	2025
Luxembourg	2025–26 Luxembourg National Division	Atert Bissen	Differdange 03	1st	—N/a
Malta	2025–26 Maltese Premier League	Floriana	Marsaxlokk	27th	2019–20
Moldova	2025–26 Moldovan Super Liga	Petrocub Hîncești	Sheriff Tiraspol	2nd	2023–24
Montenegro	2025–26 Montenegrin First League	Sutjeska Nikšić	Mornar	6th	2021–22
Netherlands	2025–26 Eredivisie	PSV Eindhoven	Feyenoord	27th	2024–25
North Macedonia	2025–26 Macedonian First Football League	Vardar	Shkëndija	12th	2019–20
Northern Ireland	2025–26 NIFL Premiership	Larne	Coleraine	3rd	2023–24
Norway	2026 Eliteserien	TBD – competition in progress			
Poland	2025–26 Ekstraklasa	Lech Poznań	Górnik Zabrze	10th	2024–25
Portugal	2025–26 Primeira Liga	Porto	Sporting CP	31st	2021–22
Republic of Ireland	2026 League of Ireland Premier Division	Shamrock Rovers	Bohemians	23rd	2025
Romania	2025–26 Liga I	Universitatea Craiova	Universitatea Cluj	5th	1990–91
Russia	2025–26 Russian Premier League	Zenit Saint Petersburg	Krasnodar	12th	2023–24
San Marino	2025–26 Campionato Sammarinese di Calcio	Tre Fiori	Virtus	9th	2019–20
Scotland	2025–26 Scottish Premiership	Celtic	Heart of Midlothian	56th	2024–25
Serbia	2025–26 Serbian SuperLiga	Red Star Belgrade	Vojvodina	37th	2024–25
Slovakia	2025–26 Slovak First Football League	Slovan Bratislava	DAC Dunajská Streda	16th	2024–25
Slovenia	2025–26 Slovenian PrvaLiga	Celje	Koper	3rd	2023–24
Spain	2025–26 La Liga	Barcelona	Real Madrid	29th	2024–25
Sweden	2026 Allsvenskan	TBD – competition in progress			
Switzerland	2025–26 Swiss Super League	Thun	St. Gallen	1st	—N/a
Turkey	2025–26 Süper Lig	Galatasaray	Fenerbahçe	26th	2024–25
Ukraine	2025–26 Ukrainian Premier League	Shakhtar Donetsk	LNZ Cherkasy	16th	2023–24
Wales	2025–26 Cymru Premier	The New Saints	Connah's Quay Nomads	18th	2024–25

=== Non FIFA ===
Nation	League	Champion	Second place	Title	Last honour
Falkland Islands	2025–26 Falkland Islands Football League				
Gozo	2025–26 Gozo First Division	Kerċem Ajax	Għajnsielem	2nd	1985–86
Greenland	2026 Greenlandic Football Championship	Boldklubben af 1967	G-44 Qeqertarsuaq	17th	2025
Monaco	2025–26 Challenge Prince Rainier III	Monte Carlo SBM	Barbagiuans Monaco	23rd	2024
Monaco	2026 Trophy Ville de Monaco	Mairie de Monaco	Seleçiun Futbol 7		2012
Northern Cyprus	2025–26 KTFF Süper Lig	Gençlik Gücü	Cihangir	1st	—N/a
Saint Barthélemy	2026 Saint-Barthelemy Championships				
Saint Pierre and Miquelon	2026 Ligue de football de Saint-Pierre-et-Miquelon				
Vatican City	2026 Vatican City Championship				

== Futsal leagues ==
=== AFC ===
Nation	League	Champion	Second place	Title	Last honour
Indonesia	2025–26 Indonesia Pro Futsal League	TBD – competition in progress			
Japan	2025–26 F.League	Nagoya Oceans	Shinagawa City	17th	2023–24
Lebanon	2025–26 Lebanese Futsal League	Nejmeh	NSK	1st	—N/a
Philippines	2026 PFF Futsaliga	ADC	Enderun	1st	—N/a

=== CONCACAF ===
Nation	League	Champion	Second place	Title	Last honour
Canada	2026 Futsal Canadian Championship	9 de Octubre	Atlético Gatineau	3rd	2024

=== CONMEBOL ===
Nation	League	Champion	Second place	Title	Last honour
Argentina	2026 Primera División de Futsal AFA	TBD – competition in progress			
Bolivia	2026 Liga Nacional de Futsal	TBD – competition in progress			
Brazil	2026 Liga Nacional de Futsal	TBD – competition in progress			
Chile	2026 Campeonato Nacional de Futsal ANFP	TBD – competition in progress			
Colombia	2026 Liga BetPlay Futsal FCF	TBD – competition in progress			
Ecuador	2026 Liga Nacional de Futsal de Ecuador	TBD – competition in progress			
Paraguay	2026 Liga Premium de Futsal	TBD – competition in progress			
Peru	2026 Liga Futsal Pro	TBD – competition in progress			
Uruguay	2026 Liga Uruguaya de Fútbol Sala	TBD – competition in progress			
Venezuela	2026 Liga FUTVE Futsal 1	TBD – competition in progress			

=== OFC ===
Nation	League	Champion	Second place	Title	Last honour
New Zealand	2026 New Zealand Futsal SuperLeague	Auckland City Futsal	Capital Futsal	1st	—

=== UEFA ===
Nation	League	Champion	Second place	Title	Last honour
Albania	2026 Albanian Futsal Championship	Tirana	Flamurtari	14th	2024–25
Andorra	2025–26 Primera Divisió	FC Rànger's	FC Encamp	5th	2023–24
Armenia	2025–26 Armenian Futsal Premier League				
Austria	2025–26 Austrian Futsal Liga	1. FSC Graz	Futsal Klagenfurt	1st	—N/a
Azerbaijan	2025–26 Azerbaijan Futsal Premier League				
(Czech Republic) Czechia	2025–26 Czech Futsal First League	FK Chrudim	SK Interobal Plzeň	16th	2024–25
Denmark	2026 Danish Futsal Championship	Hjørring Futsal Klub	Albertslund IF	3rd	2025
England	2025–26 National Futsal Series	Genesis Futsal Club	Bolton Futsal Club	1st	—N/a
Estonia	2025–26 Saalijalgpalli Meistriliiga	Tallinna FC Bunker Partner	Narva United	2nd	2024–25
Finland	2025–26 Futsal-Liiga	Futsal Mad Max	Akaa Futsal	1st	—N/a
Germany	2025–26 Bundesliga Futsal	TSV Weilimdorf	HOT 05 Futsal	3rd	2024–25
Kosovo	2025–26 Futsal Superleague of Kosovo	Drenica	FC Prishtina 01	1st	—N/a
Lithuania	2025–26 TOPsport Lyga	Kauno Žalgiris	Akmenės	9th	2024–25
Luxembourg	2025–26 Championnat Futsal	Differdange 03	Progrès Niederkorn	8th	2024–25
Malta	2025–26 Maltese Futsal League	Luxol St Andrews	University of Malta	10th	2024–25
Moldova	2025–26 Futsal Moldovan Liga	Clic Media	Atletic Strășeni	3rd	2024–25
North Macedonia	2025–26 First Macedonian Futsal League	KMF Proekt	KMF Kegi Mobi	1st	—N/a
Poland	Ekstraklasa	Piast Gliwice	Eurobusu Przemyśl	3rd	2024–25
Serbia	2025–26 Serbian Prva Futsal Liga	KMF Loznica	KMF Smederevo	4th	2024–25
Slovakia	2025–26 Slovak Futsal Extraliga	Mimel Lučenec	Futsal Team Levice	7th	2024–25
Sweden	2025–26 Swedish Futsal League	FC Kalmar	Skoftebyns IF	1st	—N/a

== Men's domestic cups ==
=== AFC ===
Nation	Cup	Champion	Final score	Second place	Title	Last honour
Australia	2026 Australia Cup	South Melbourne	1–1 (a.e.t.) (4–3 p)	Melbourne Victory	1st	—N/a
Bahrain	2025–26 King's Cup	TBD - Competition in progress				
Bahrain	2025–26 Khalid Bin Hamad Cup	Al-Riffa SC	1–1 (a.e.t.) (5–3 p)	Al-Muharraq SC	1st	—N/a
Bahrain	2025–26 Bahraini Super Cup	TBD - Competition in progress				
Bangladesh	2025–26 Federation Cup	Bashundhara Kings	3–2	Mohammedan SC	5th	2024–25
Brunei	2026 Brunei FA Cup	TBD - Competition in progress				
Cambodia	2026 Hun Sen Cup	TBD - Competition in progress				
Cambodia	2026 Cambodian Super Cup	TBD - Competition in progress				
China	2026 Chinese FA Cup	TBD - Competition in progress				
China	2026 Chinese FA Super Cup	Beijing Guoan	2–0	Shanghai Port	3rd	2003
Hong Kong	2025–26 Hong Kong FA Cup	Tai Po	2–1	Eastern District	2nd	2008-09
Hong Kong	2025–26 Hong Kong Senior Challenge Shield	Tai Po	4–1 (a.e.t.)	Hong Kong Rangers	2nd	2012–13
Hong Kong	2025–26 Hong Kong League Cup	Lee Man	2–1	Kitchee	1st	—N/a
India	2026 Kalinga Super Cup	TBD - Competition in progress				
India	2026 Durand Cup	TBD - Competition in progress				
Iran	2025–26 Hazfi Cup	Suspended due to the 2026 Iran war				
Iran	2026 Iranian Super Cup	Suspended due to the 2026 Iran war				
Iraq	2025–26 Iraq FA Cup	Tournament cancelled due to scheduling difficulties				
Iraq	2026 Iraqi Super Cup	TBD - Competition in progress				
Japan	2026 Emperor's Cup	TBD - Competition in progress				
Japan	2026 J.League Cup	TBD - Competition in progress				
Japan	2026 Japanese Super Cup	TBD - Competition in progress				
Jordan	2025–26 Jordan FA Cup	Al-Hussein	3–0	Al-Ramtha	1st	—N/a
Jordan	2026 Jordan Shield Cup	TBD - Competition in progress				
Jordan	2026 Jordan Super Cup	TBD - Competition in progress				
Kuwait	2025–26 Kuwait Crown Prince Cup	Al-Arabi SC	3–0	Kuwait SC	10th	2022–23
Kuwait	2025–26 Kuwait Emir Cup	Suspended due to the 2026 Iran war				
Kuwait	2025–26 Kuwait Super Cup	Qadsia	1-1 (a.e.t.) (4–3 p)	Kuwait SC	7th	2019
Kyrgyzstan	2026 Kyrgyzstan Cup	TBD - Competition in progress				
Kyrgyzstan	2026 Kyrgyzstan Super Cup	TBD - Competition in progress				
Laos	2026 Prime Minister's Cup	TBD - Competition in progress				
Lebanon	2025–26 Lebanese FA Cup	Nejmeh	2–0	Sagesse	9th	2022–23
Lebanon	2026 Lebanese Super Cup	TBD - Competition in progress				
Lebanon	2026 National Solidarity Tournament	Al Ansar	2–2 (14–13 p)	Nejmeh	1st	—N/a
Lebanon	Macau	2026 Taça de Macau	TBD - Competition in progress			
Malaysia	2026 Malaysia FA Cup	TBD - Competition in progress				
Malaysia	2026 Malaysia Cup	Johor Darul Ta'zim	2–0	Kuching FA	6th	2024–25
Malaysia	2026 MFL Challenge Cup	Sabah	0–0 (a.e.t.) (4–3 p)	Penang	1st	—N/a
Malaysia	2026 Piala Sumbangsih	TBD - Competition in progress				
Maldives	2026 Maldivian FA Charity Shield	TBD - Competition in progress				
Myanmar	2026 MNL League Cup	TBD - Competition in progress				
Oman	2025–26 Oman Professional League Cup	TBD - Competition in progress				
Oman	2025–26 Sultan Qaboos Cup	TBD - Competition in progress				
Qatar	2026 Qatar Cup	TBD - Competition in progress				
Qatar	2026 Emir of Qatar Cup	Al-Gharafa	4–1	Al Sadd	9th	2025
Qatar	2025–26 QSL Cup	Al-Rayyan	2–0	Muaither	1st	—N/a
Saudi Arabia	2025–26 King's Cup	Al-Hilal	2–1	Al-Kholood	10th	2024
Saudi Arabia	2026 Saudi Super Cup	TBD - Competition in progress				
Singapore	2025–26 Singapore Cup	Lion City Sailors	3–0; Awarded (Note: The match, originally won by Lion City Sailors 2–0 after extra time, was forfeited by Tampines Rovers and awarded 3–0 to Lion City Sailors, as Tampines fielded more than the allowed number of foreigners)	Tampines Rovers	9th	2024–25
South Korea	2026-27 Korea Cup	Competition switched into Summer-Spring calendar				
(Chinese Taipei) Taiwan	2026 Taiwan President FA Cup	TBD - Competition in progress				
Tajikistan	2026 Tajikistan Cup	TBD - Competition in progress				
Tajikistan	2026 Tajik Super Cup	Regar-TadAZ	2–1	Istiklol	1st	—N/a
Thailand	2025–26 Thai FA Cup	Buriram United	1–0 (a.e.t.)	PT Prachuap	8th	2024–25
Thailand	2025–26 Thai League Cup	Port	1–0	BG Pathum United	2nd	2010
Turkmenistan	2026 Turkmenistan Cup	TBD - Competition in progress				
United Arab Emirates	2025–26 UAE President's Cup	TBD - Competition in progress				
United Arab Emirates	2025–26 UAE League Cup	Al Wahda	0–0 (4–2 p)	Al Ain	4th	2023–24
United Arab Emirates	2026 UAE Super Cup	TBD - Competition in progress				
Uzbekistan	2026 Uzbekistan Cup	TBD - Competition in progress				
Uzbekistan	2026 Uzbekistan Super Cup	Neftchi Fergana	1–0	Pakhtakor	1st	—N/a
Vietnam	2025–26 Vietnamese Cup	Công An Hồ Chí Minh City	2–1	Ninh Bình	3rd	1999–2000
Vietnam	2026 Vietnamese Super Cup	TBD - Competition not yet started				

=== CAF ===
Nation	Cup	Champion	Final score	Second place	Title	Last honour
Algeria	2025–26 Algerian Cup	USM Alger	2–1	CR Belouizdad	10th	2024–25
Algeria	2025 Algerian Super Cup	MC Alger	1–0	USM Alger	5th	2024
Angola	2026 Angolan Cup	Wiliete	2–1	Kabuscorp	1st	—N/a
Botswana	2026 Botswana FA Cup	Jwaneng Galaxy	2–1	Mochudi Centre Chiefs	3rd	2025
Burkina Faso	2025–26 Burkina Faso Cup	Vitesse FC	1–1 (6–5 p)	Sporting Cascades	1st	—N/a
Burundi	2025 Burundian Cup	Rukinzo	1–0	Aigle Noir Makamba	2nd	2024
Egypt	2025–26 Egypt Cup	Pyramids	2–1	ZED FC	2nd	2023–24
Ethiopia	2026 Ethiopian Cup	TBD - Competition in progress				
Ghana	2025–26 Ghana FA Cup	Nations	1–1 (a.e.t.) (5–4 p)	Dreams	1st	—N/a
Ivory Coast	2026 Coupe de Côte d'Ivoire	CO Korhogo	1–1 (a.e.t.) (4–3 p)	SOA	1st	—N/a
Mali	2026 Malian Cup	Djoliba AC	2–0	FC Diarra	21st	2022
Morocco	2025–26 Moroccan Throne Cup	TBD - Competition in progress				
Mozambique	2026 Mozambique Super Cup	Associação Black Bulls	2–2 (3–2 p)	UD Songo	3rd	2024
Rwanda	2026 Heroes Cup	APR	1–1 (3–2 p)	Rayon Sports	2nd	2025
South Africa	2025–26 Nedbank Cup	Durban City	2–1	TS Galaxy	1st	—N/a
Togo	2025–26 Coupe de l'Indépendance	Gbohloé-su des Lacs	0–0 (5–4 p)	ASC Kara	1st	—N/a
Tunisia	2025–26 Tunisian Cup	Espérance ST	1–0	ES Zarzis	17th	2024–25
Uganda	2025–26 Uganda Cup	Kitara	2–1	SC Villa	2nd	2023–24
Zambia	2026 ABSA Cup	Red Arrows	2–0	Power Dynamos	3rd	2024
Zimbabwe	2026 Zimbabwe Challenge Cup	TBD - Competition in progress				

=== CONCACAF ===
Nation	Cup	Champion	Final score	Second place	Title	Last honour
Anguilla	2026 President's Cup	Attackers	2–0	Roaring Lions	1st	—N/a
Bermuda	2025–26 FA Cup Challenge	North Village Rams	1–1 (5–4 p)	Devonshire Colts	12th	2023
Canada	2026 Canadian Championship	Forge FC	1–1 (4–2 p)	CF Montréal	1st	—N/a
Costa Rica	2025–26 Costa Rican Cup	Deportivo Saprissa	3–1	Sporting San José	8th	2013
El Salvador	2026 Copa Presidente	TBD – competition in progress				
Guatemala	2026 Supercopa de Guatemala	Antigua GFC	0–0 (10–9 p)	Aurora FC	1st	—N/a
Grenada	2025–26 GFA Super Cup	Paradise	3–1	Queens Park Rangers	8th	2024
Mexico	2026 Campeón de Campeones	Cruz Azul	3–1	Toluca FC	4th	2021
Nicaragua	2026 Copa Primera	TBD – competition in progress				
United States	2026 U.S. Open Cup	St. Louis City SC	0–0 (5–3 p)	Columbus Crew	1st	—N/a

=== CONMEBOL ===
Nation	Cup	Champion	Final score	Second place	Title	Last honour
Argentina	2026 Copa Argentina	TBD — competition in progress				
Argentina	2025 Supercopa Argentina	Estudiantes (LP)	3–2 (a.e.t.)	Independiente Rivadavia	1st	—N/a
Argentina	2026 Supercopa Internacional	Rosario Central	3–1	Estudiantes (LP)	1st	—N/a
Argentina	2026 Trofeo de Campeones	TBD — competition to be held in December				
Bolivia	2026 Copa Bolivia	TBD — competition in progress				
(Brazil) Brasil	2026 Copa do Brasil	TBD — competition in progress				
(Brazil) Brasil	2026 Supercopa do Brasil	Corinthians	2–0	Flamengo	2nd	1991
Chile	2026 Copa Chile	TBD — competition in progress				
Chile	2026 Copa de la Liga	Coquimbo Unido	3–0	O'Higgins	1st	—N/a
Chile	2026 Supercopa de Chile	Coquimbo Unido	0–0 (8–7 p)	Universidad Católica	1st	—N/a
Colombia	2026 Copa Colombia	TBD — competition in progress				
Colombia	2026 Superliga Colombiana	Santa Fe	4–1 (agg.)	Junior	5th	2021
Ecuador	2026 Copa Ecuador	TBD — competition in progress				
Ecuador	2026 Supercopa Ecuador	Independiente del Valle	3–0	Universidad Católica	2nd	2023
Paraguay	2026 Copa Paraguay	TBD — competition in progress				
Paraguay	2026 Supercopa Paraguay	TBD — competition to be held in December				
Peru	2026 Copa de la Liga	TBD — competition in progress				
Uruguay	2026 Copa Uruguay	TBD — competition in progress				
Uruguay	2026 Copa de la Liga AUF	Progreso	2–1	Boston River	1st	—N/a
Uruguay	2026 Supercopa Uruguaya	Peñarol	0–0 (4–2 p)	Nacional	3rd	2022
Venezuela	2026 Copa Venezuela	TBD — competition in progress				
Venezuela	2026 Supercopa de Venezuela	Universidad Central	Awarded (Note: The Supercopa de Venezuela title was awarded to Universidad Central after they won both the 2025 Liga FUTVE and the 2025 Copa Venezuela.)		1st	—N/a

=== OFC ===
Nation	Cup	Champion	Final score	Second place	Title	Last honour
Fiji	2026 Champion versus Champion	Rewa	1–0	Labasa	3rd	2025
New Zealand	2026 Chatham Cup	Fencibles United	2–1	Cashmere Technical	1st	—N/a

=== UEFA ===
Nation	Cup	Champion	Final score	Second place	Title	Last honour
Albania	2025–26 Albanian Cup	Dinamo City	3–2	Egnatia	15th	2024–25
Albania	2026 Albanian Supercup	TBD — competition in progress				
Andorra	2026 Copa Constitució	Atlètic Club d'Escaldes	3−2	FC Santa Coloma	2nd	2022
Andorra	2026 Andorran Supercup	TBD — competition in progress				
Armenia	2025–26 Armenian Cup	Noah	4–2	Urartu	3rd	2024–25
Armenia	2026 Armenian Supercup	Noah	1–1 (4–2 p)	Ararat-Armenia	2nd	2020
Austria	2025–26 Austrian Cup	LASK	4–2 (a.e.t.)	Rheindorf Altach	2nd	1964–65
Azerbaijan	2025–26 Azerbaijan Cup	Sabah	2–1	Zira	2nd	2024–25
Azerbaijan	2025 Azerbaijan Supercup	TBD — competition in progress				
Belarus	2025–26 Belarusian Cup	BATE Borisov	1–1 (a.e.t.) (8–7 p)	Dinamo Minsk	6th	2021
Belarus	2026 Belarusian Super Cup	Neman Grodno	2–2 (5–4 p)	Maxline Vitebsk	1st	—N/a
Belgium	2025–26 Belgian Cup	Union SG	3–1 (a.e.t.)	Anderlecht	4th	2023–24
Belgium	2026 Belgian Super Cup	Union SG	1–1 (5-4 p)	Brugge	2nd	2024
Bosnia and Herzegovina	2025–26 Bosnia and Herzegovina Football Cup	Zrinjski Mostar	2–1	Velež Mostar	4th	2023–24
Bosnia and Herzegovina	2025 Supercup of Bosnia and Herzegovina	Zrinjski Mostar	0–0 (4–1 p)	Sarajevo	2nd	2024
Bulgaria	2025–26 Bulgarian Cup	CSKA Sofia	1–1 (4–3 p)	Lokomotiv Plovdiv	22nd	2020–21
Bulgaria	2025 Bulgarian Supercup	Ludogorets Razgrad	1–0	Levski Sofia	9th	2024
Bulgaria	2026 Bulgarian Supercup	CSKA Sofia	4–2	Levski Sofia	5th	2011
Croatia	2025–26 Croatian Football Cup	Dinamo Zagreb	2–0	Rijeka	18th	2023–24
Cyprus	2025–26 Cypriot Cup	Pafos	2−0	Apollon Limassol	2nd	2023–24
Cyprus	2026 Cypriot Super Cup	Pafos	1−0	Omonia	1st	—N/a
Czech Republic	2025–26 Czech Cup	Karviná	3–1	Jablonec	1st	—N/a
Denmark	2025–26 Danish Cup	Midtjylland	1–0	Copenhagen	3rd	2021–22
England	2025–26 FA Cup	Manchester City	1–0	Chelsea	8th	2022–23
England	2025–26 EFL Cup	Manchester City	2–0	Arsenal	9th	2020–21
England	2026 FA Community Shield	Arsenal	3–0	Manchester City	18th	2023
Estonia	2025–26 Estonian Cup	Flora	5–1	Paide Linnameeskond	9th	2019–20
Estonia	2026 Estonian Supercup	Nõmme Kalju	3–1	Flora	2nd	2019
Faroe Islands	2026 Faroe Islands Cup	TBD — competition in progress				
Faroe Islands	2026 Faroe Islands Super Cup	KI Klaksvik	1–0	HB Torshavn	4th	2023
Finland	2026 Finnish Cup	TBD — competition in progress				
Finland	2026 Finnish League Cup	Inter Turku	2–1	AC Oulu	4th	2025
France	2025–26 Coupe de France	Lens	3–1	Nice	1st	—N/a
France	2026 Trophée des Champions	Lens	1–0	Paris Saint-Germain	1st	—N/a
Germany	2025–26 DFB-Pokal	Bayern Munich	3–0	VfB Stuttgart	21st	2019–20
Germany	2026 Franz Beckenbauer Supercup	Bayern Munich	2–1	Borussia Dortmund	12th	2025
(Georgia (country)) Georgia	2026 Georgian Cup	TBD — competition in progress				
(Georgia (country)) Georgia	2026 Georgian Super Cup	Torpedo Kutaisi	2–2 (6–5 p)	Iberia 1999	4th	2024
Gibraltar	2025–26 Peninsula Rock Cup	Lincoln Red Imps	5–0	Mons Calpe	21st	2023–24
Greece	2025–26 Greek Cup	OFI	3–2	PAOK	2nd	1986–87
Greece	2026 Greek Super Cup	OFI	2–2 (5–4 p)	AEK Athens	1st	—N/a
Hungary	2025–26 Magyar Kupa	Ferencváros	1–0 (a.e.t.)	Zalaegerszeg	25th	2021–22
Iceland	2026 Icelandic Men's Football Cup	TBD — competition in progress				
Iceland	2026 Icelandic Super Cup	Víkingur Reykjavík	4–0	IF Vestri	5th	2024
Iceland	2026 Icelandic Men's Football League Cup	Fylkir	4–4 (4–3 p)	KR	1st	—N/a
(Republic of Ireland) Ireland	2026 FAI Cup	TBD — competition in progress				
(Republic of Ireland) Ireland	2026 President of Ireland's Cup	Derry City	1–0	Shamrock Rovers	2nd	2023
Israel	2025–26 Israel State Cup	Maccabi Tel Aviv	2–1	Hapoel Be'er Sheva	25th	2020-21
Israel	2025–26 Toto Cup Al	Beitar Jerusalem	2–1	Hapoel Tel Aviv	4th	2019–20
Israel	2026 Israel Super Cup	Maccabi Tel Aviv	3–1	Hapoel Be'er Sheva	9th	2024
Italy	2025–26 Coppa Italia	Inter Milan	2–0	Lazio	10th	2022–23
Italy	2026 Supercoppa Italiana	TBD — competition in progress				
Kazakhstan	2026 Kazakhstan Cup	TBD — competition in progress				
Kazakhstan	2026 Kazakhstan Super Cup	Tobol	2–2 (5–4 p)	Kairat	4th	2024
Kazakhstan	2026 Kazakhstan League Cup	TBD — competition in progress				
Kosovo	2025–26 Kosovar Cup	Dukagjini	2–1	Ferizaj	1st	—N/a
Kosovo	2026 Kosovar Supercup	TBD — competition in progress				
Latvia	2026 Latvian Football Cup	TBD — competition in progress				
Latvia	2026 Latvian Supercup	TBD — competition in progress				
Liechtenstein	2025–26 Liechtenstein Cup	FC Vaduz	4–3	USV Eschen/Mauren	52nd	2024–25
Lithuania	2026 Lithuanian Football Cup	TBD — competition in progress				
Lithuania	2026 Lithuanian Supercup	TBD — competition in progress				
Luxembourg	2025–26 Luxembourg Cup	Differdange 03	4–1	Victoria Rosport	21st	2024-25
Malta	2025–26 Maltese FA Trophy	Valletta	2–1	Gżira United	15th	2017–18
Malta	2026 Maltese Super Cup	TBD — competition in progress				
Moldova	2025–26 Moldovan Cup	Sheriff Tiraspol	2–0	Zimbru	13th	2024-25
Montenegro	2025–26 Montenegrin Cup	Mornar	1–0	Dečić	1st	—N/a
Netherlands	2025–26 KNVB Cup	AZ	5–1	NEC	5th	2012–13
Netherlands	2026 Johan Cruyff Shield	AZ	4–0	PSV	2nd	2009
North Macedonia	2025–26 Macedonian Football Cup	Sileks	1–0	Shkëndija	4th	2020–21
Northern Ireland	2025–26 Irish Cup	Coleraine	3–2	Dungannon Swifts	7th	2017–18
Northern Ireland	2026 NIFL Charity Shield	TBD — competition in progress				
Northern Ireland	2025–26 Northern Ireland Football League Cup	Linfield	1–0 (a.e.t.)	Glentoran	13th	2023–24
Norway	2025–26 Norwegian Football Cup	Bodø/Glimt	3–3 (4–2 p)	Brann	3rd	1993
Poland	2025–26 Polish Cup	Górnik Zabrze	2–0	Raków	7th	1971–72
Poland	2026 Polish Super Cup	Lech Poznań	3–1	Górnik Zabrze	7th	2016
Portugal	2025–26 Taça de Portugal	Torreense	2–1 (a.e.t.)	Sporting CP	1st	—N/a
Portugal	2025–26 Taça da Liga	Vitória de Guimarães	2–1	Braga	1st	—N/a
Portugal	2026 Supertaça Cândido de Oliveira	FC Porto	1–0	Torreense	25th	2024
Romania	2025–26 Cupa României	Universitatea Craiova	0–0 (a.e.t.) (6–5 p)	'U' Cluj	8th	2020–21
Romania	2026 Supercupa României	Universitatea Craiova	1–1 (5–3 p)	Universitatea Cluj	2nd	2021
Russia	2025–26 Russian Cup	Spartak Moscow	1–1 (a.e.t.) (4–3 p)	Krasnodar	5th	2021–22
Russia	2026 Russian Super Cup	Zenit Saint Petersburg	1–1 (4–2 p)	Spartak Moscow	11th	2024
San Marino	2025–26 Coppa Titano	La Fiorita	3–1	Tre Fiori	8th	2023–24
San Marino	2026 Super Coppa Sammarinese	TBD — competition in progress				
Scotland	2025–26 Scottish Cup	Celtic	3–1	Dunfermline Athletic	43th	2023–24
Scotland	2025–26 Scottish League Cup	St Mirren	3–1	Celtic	2nd	2013
Serbia	2025–26 Serbian Cup	Red Star Belgrade	2–2 (a.e.t.) (5–4 p)	Vojvodina	9th	2024–25
Slovakia	2025–26 Slovak Cup	Žilina	3–1	FC Košice	2nd	2011–12
Slovenia	2025–26 Slovenian Football Cup	Aluminij	1–0	Brinje Grosuplje	1st	—N/a
Spain	2025–26 Copa del Rey	Real Sociedad	2–2 (4–3 p)	Atlético Madrid	4th	2019–20
Spain	2026 Supercopa de España	Barcelona	3–2	Real Madrid	16th	2025
Sweden	2025–26 Svenska Cupen	Mjällby	2–1	Hammarby	1st	—N/a
Switzerland	2025–26 Swiss Cup	St. Gallen	3–0	Lausanne Ouchy	2nd	1968–69
Turkey	2025–26 Turkish Cup	Trabzonspor	2–1	Konyaspor	10th	2019–20
Turkey	2026 Turkish Super Cup	TBD — competition in progress				
Ukraine	2025–26 Ukrainian Cup	Dynamo Kyiv	3–1	FC Chernihiv	14th	2020–21
Wales	2025–26 Welsh Cup	Caernarfon Town	3–0	Flint Town United	1st	—N/a
Wales	2025–26 Welsh League Cup	Barry Town United	2–0	The New Saints	5th	1999–00

=== Non UEFA ===
Nation	League	Champion	Final score	Second place	Title	Last honour
Gozo	2025–26 G.F.A. Cup	Xewkija Tigers	2–1 (a.e.t.)	Qala Saints	12th	2017–18
Gozo	2025–26 GFA First Division Knock-Out	Kerċem Ajax	3–1	Victoria Wanderers	1st	—N/a
Gozo	2025–26 GFA Second Division Knock-Out	Sannat Lions	2–0	Għarb Rangers	4th	1972–73

== Futsal cups ==
=== AFC ===
Nation	Cup	Champion	Final score	Second place	Title	Last honour
Japan	2026 All Japan Futsal Championship	Pescadola Machida	2–2 (a.e.t.) (4–3 p)	Bardral Urayasu	31st	2016
Lebanon	2025–26 Lebanese Futsal Cup	Not disputed due to the 2026 Lebanon war				

=== CONMEBOL ===
Nation	Cup	Champion	Final score	Second place	Title	Last honour
Argentina	2026 Supercopa de Futsal AFA	Independiente	2–0	17 de Agosto	1st	—N/a
Brazil	2026 Brazil Futsal Supercup	Magnus Futsal	4–2	Atlântico Futsal	4th	2024

=== UEFA ===
Nation	Cup	Champion	Final score	Second place	Title	Last honour
Albania	2026 Albanian Futsal Cup	Flamurtari Vlorë Futsal	3–2	KF Vllaznia Futsal	3rd	2025
Belgium	2025–26 Belgian Futsal Cup	RSC Anderlecht Futsal	5–1	ZVC Pibo Bilzen	9th	2024–2025
Croatia	2025–26 Croatian Futsal Cup	HMNK Rijeka	8–5	Dinamo Zagreb	1st	—N/a
France	2025–26 Coupe de France de futsal	Nantes Métropole	1–1 (a.e.t.) (5–4 p)	Toulon Métropole	2nd	2021–22
Italy	2026 Coppa Italia Futsal	Meta Catania	5–2	Feldi Eboli	1st	—N/a
Kosovo	2025–26 Kosovan Futsal Cup	Prishtina	6–3	FC Liqeni	5th	2024–25
Luxembourg	2025–26 Luxembourg Fustal Cup	Differdange 03	4–3	Leudelange	6th	2024–25
Moldova	2026 Moldovan Fustal Cup	Clic Media	9–1	Steaua Dental	6th	2025
North Macedonia	2025–26 North Macedonian Futsal Cup	KMF Proekt	8–3	KMF Kegi Mobi	1st	—N/a
Portugal	2025–26 Taça de Portugal de Futsal	Benfica	6–5	Sporting CP	9th	2022–23
Portugal	2025–26 Taça da Liga de Futsal	Benfica	7–1	Eléctrico	5th	2022–23
Republic of Ireland	2025–26 FAI Futsal Cup	Blue Magic FC	6–3	Leinster Futsal	10th	2025
Serbia	2025–26 Serbian Futsal Cup	KMF Loznica	3–1	FK Partizan	1st	—N/a
Spain	2025–26 Copa del Rey de Futsal	Jaén FS	5–3	Jimbee Cartagena	1st	—N/a
Spain	2026 Copa de España de Futsal	Jaén FS	0–0 (a.e.t.) (4–2 p)	Barcelona	4th	2023
Ukraine	2025–26 Ukraine Futsal Cup	HIT Kyiv	2–1 (a.e.t.)	Cardinal Rivne	1st	—N/a

== Women's national leagues ==
=== AFC ===
Nation	League	Champion	Second place	Title	Last honour
Australia	2025–26 A-League Women (Note: In A-League Women and its male counterpart of A-League Men, the term "champion" refers to the winner of the finals series—i.e., the playoffs that follow the league season.)	Melbourne City	Wellington Phoenix	5th	2021–22
Japan	2025–26 WE League	INAC Kobe Leonessa	Urawa Red Diamonds Ladies	2nd	2021–22
Lebanon	2025–26 Lebanese Women's Football League	No Limits	BFA	1st	—N/a
Malaysia	2025–26 Malaysia National Women's League	TBD — competition in progress			
Philippines	2026 PFF Women's League	Kaya–Iloilo	Far Eastern University	3rd	2025
Singapore	2026 Women's Premier League	Lion City Sailors	Albirex Jurong	4th	2024
Timor-Leste	2025–26 Timor-Leste Women's Football League	S'Amuser	Sport Laulara e Benfica	2nd	2021
Vietnam	2026 V-Women's League	TBD – competition in progress			

=== CAF ===
Nation	League	Champion	Second place	Title	Last honour
Algeria	2025–26 Algerian Women's Championship	TBD – competition in progress			

=== CONCACAF ===
Nation	League	Champion	Second place	Title	Last honour
Canada	2026 Northern Super League	TBD – competition in progress			
Mexico	2026 Liga MX Femenil Clausura	América	Monterrey	3rd	2023 Clausura
Mexico	2026 Liga MX Femenil Apertura	TBD – competition in progress			
Puerto Rico	2026 Liga Puerto Rico Femenino Clausura	TBD – competition in progress			
Puerto Rico	2026 Liga Puerto Rico Femenino Apertura	TBD – competition in progress			
United States	2026 NWSL season	Kansas City Current	Washington Spirit	1st (Note: The Current is a different franchise from FC Kansas City, which won two NWSL titles before folding at the end of the 2017 season.)	—N/a
United States	2025–26 USL Super League	Lexington SC	Carolina Ascent	1st	—N/a

=== CONMEBOL ===
Nation	League	Champion	Second place	Title	Last honour
Argentina	2026 Primera División A Apertura	Racing	San Lorenzo	1st	—N/a
Argentina	2026 Primera División A Clausura	TBD – competition in progress			
Bolivia	2026 Liga Femenina	Bolívar	Astor	1st	—N/a
Brazil	2026 Campeonato Brasileiro de Futebol Feminino Série A1	São Paulo	Corinthians	2nd	1997
Chile	2026 Liga Femenina	TBD – competition in progress			
Colombia	2026 Liga Femenina	Deportivo Cali	Santa Fe	4th	2025
Ecuador	2026 Superliga Femenina	Independiente del Valle	LDU Quito	3rd	2025
Paraguay	2026 Campeonato Anual FEM	Olimpia	Libertad	3rd	2023
Peru	2026 Liga Femenina	TBD – competition in progress			
Uruguay	2026 Campeonato Uruguayo Femenino	TBD – competition in progress			
Venezuela	2026 Liga FUTVE Femenina	Caracas	Academia Puerto Cabello	7th	2023

=== OFC ===
Nation	League	Champion	Second place	Title	Last honour
New Zealand	2026 New Zealand Women's National League	TBD – competition in progress			

=== UEFA ===
Nation	League	Champion	Second place	Title	Last honour
Andorra	2025–26 Primera Divisió	FC Ordino	Casa de Portugal	1st	—N/a
Austria	2025–26 ÖFB Frauen Bundesliga	FK Austria Wien	SKN St. Pölten	1st	—N/a
Belarus	2026 Belarusian Women's Premier League	TBD – competition in progress			
Belgium	2025–26 Belgian Women's Super League	Oud-Heverlee Leuven	Anderlecht	2nd	2024–25
Croatia	2025–26 Croatian Women's First Football League	Hajduk Split	ŽNK Agram	1st	—N/a
Czech Republic	2025–26 Czech Women's First League	Sparta Prague	Slavia Prague	22nd	2021
Denmark	2025–26 A-Liga (Note: Previously known as Kvindeliga ("Women's League").)	HB Køge	Brøndby	4th	2022–23
England	2025–26 Women's Super League	Manchester City	Arsenal	2nd	2016
France	2025–26 Première Ligue	Lyon	Paris FC	19th	2024–25
Germany	2025–26 Frauen-Bundesliga	Bayern Munich	VfL Wolfsburg	7th (Note: Does not include one pre-Bundesliga championship.)	2024–25
Gibraltar	2025–26 Gibraltar Women's Football League	Mons Calpe	College 1975	1st	—N/a
Greece	2025–26 Greek A Division	PAOK	AEK Athens	20th	2023–24
Hungary	2025–26 Női NB I	Ferencváros	Puskás Akadémia	9th	2024–25
Iceland	2026 Besta deild kvenna	TBD – competition in progress			
Italy	2025–26 Women's Serie A	Roma	Inter Milan	3rd	2023–24
Luxembourg	2025–26 Dames Ligue 1	Racing Union	Differdange 03	6th	2024–25
Malta	2025–26 Maltese Women's League	Mġarr United	Swieqi United	1st	—N/a
Moldova	2025–26 Moldovan Women Top League	Zimbru Chișinău	Agarista-ȘS Anenii Noi	1st	—N/a
Netherlands	2025–26 Vrouwen Eredivisie	PSV Eindhoven	AFC Ajax	1st	—N/a
Norway	2026 Toppserien	TBD – competition in progress			
Portugal	2025–26 Campeonato Nacional Feminino	Benfica	Sporting CP	6th	2024–25
Republic of Ireland	2026 League of Ireland Women's Premier Division	TBD – competition in progress			
Romania	2025–26 Liga I	Farul Constanța	Csíkszereda Miercurea Ciuc	3rd	2024–25
Scotland	2025–26 Scottish Women's Premier League	Heart of Midlothian	Rangers	1st	—N/a
Serbia	2025–26 Serbian Women's Super League	Red Star Belgrade	TSC	3rd	2024–25
Spain	2025–26 Liga F	Barcelona	Real Madrid	11th	2024–25
Sweden	2026 Damallsvenskan	Häcken	Hammaarby	3rd	2025
Switzerland	2025–26 Swiss Women's Super League	Servette Chênois	YB Frauen	2nd	2020–21
Turkey	2025–26 Turkish Women's Super League	Fenerbahçe	Trabzonspor	1st	—N/a
Ukraine	2025–26 Ukrainian Women's Top League	Metalist 1925 Kharkiv	FC Seasters	11th	2020–21
Wales	2025–26 Adran Premier	Wrexham	Cardiff City	1st	—N/a

== Women's futsal leagues ==
=== AFC ===
Nation	Cup	Champion	Second place	Title	Last honour
Lebanon	2025–26 Lebanese Women's Futsal League	TBD – competition in progress			
Philippines	2026 PFF Futsaliga	FEU	Beach Hut	1st	—N/a

=== CONCACAF ===
Nation	Cup	Champion	Second place	Title	Last honour
Canada	2026 Women’s Futsal Canadian Championship	Sporting Montréal	Saskatoon Green & White	1st	—N/a

=== OFC ===
Nation	League	Champion	Second place	Title	Last honour
New Zealand	2026 New Zealand Women's Futsal SuperLeague	Capital Futsal	Canterbury United Pride Futsal	2nd	2024

=== UEFA ===
Nation	Cup	Champion	Second place	Title	Last honour
Denmark	2025–26 Danish Women's Futsal Championship	Næstved HG	FC Copenhagen	1st	—N/a
England	2025–26 National Women's Futsal Series	Bloomsbury Futsal Club	Helvécia Futsal Club	3rd	2024–25
Finland	2025–26 Futsal-Liiga	PU-62	Ilves FS	1st	—N/a
Kazakhstan	2025–26 Kazakhstani Women's Futsal Championship	AFC Kairat	MFC Aktobe	2nd	2024–25
Malta	2025–26 ENEMED Women’s Futsal League	Zero Sei Futsal	Luxol Argus	2nd	2024–25
Poland	2025–26 Polish Women's Futsal Championship	Górzno Nowy Świt	Rekord Bielsko-Biała	3rd	2024–25
Slovenia	2025–26 Slovenian Women's Futsal League	ŽNK Celje	Beauty Healing Trzin	8th	2024–25
Sweden	2025–26 Swedish Women's Futsal League	Skoftebyns IF	Svartinge SK	1st	—N/a
Ukraine	2025–26 Ukrainian Women's Futsal Championship	Champions Way UDU	MNK Dipro	2nd	2024–25

== Women's domestic cups ==
=== AFC ===
Nation	Cup	Champion	Final score	Second place	Title	Last honour
Saudi Arabia	2025–26 Saudi Women's Cup	Al-Nassr	3–2 (a.e.t.)	Al Hilal	1st	—N/a
Vietnam	2026 Vietnamese Women's National Cup	Hồ Chí Minh City	0–0 (3–0 p)	Hà Nội I	5th	2025

=== CAF ===
Nation	Cup	Champion	Final score	Second place	Title	Last honour
Algeria	2025–26 Algerian Women's Cup	JS Kabylie	1–0	Afak Relizane	2nd	2024–25
Cameroon	2026 Cameroon Women's Super Cup	Lekié FF	1–0	Louves Minproff	—	—

=== CONCACAF ===
Nation	Cup	Champion	Final score	Second place	Title	Last honour
Anguilla	2026 Women's President's Cup	Superstars	1–1 (7–6 p)	De Youngsters	2nd	2025
United States	2026 NWSL Challenge Cup	Gotham FC	2–0	Kansas City Current	1st	—N/a

=== UEFA ===
Nation	Cup	Champion	Final score	Second place	Title	Last honour
Austria	2025–26 ÖFB Frauen Cup	Austria Wien	1–0	Red Bull Salzburg	1st	—N/a
Belgium	2025–26 Belgian Women's Cup	Anderlecht	3–0	Zulte Waregem	12th	2021–22
Cyprus	2025–26 Cypriot Women's Cup	Apollon Ladies	2–1	Aris Ladies	15th	2024–25
Czech Republic	2025–26 Czech Women's Cup	Sparta Prague	0–0 (4–3 p)	Slavia Prague	11th	2018–19
Denmark	2025–26 Danish Women's Cup	HB Køge	4–1	Nordsjælland	1st	—N/a
England	2025–26 Women's FA Cup	Manchester City	4–0	Brighton & Hove Albion	4th	2020
England	2025–26 Women's League Cup	Chelsea	3–0	Manchester United	4th	2024–25
Estonia	2025–26 Estonian Women's Cup	Saku Sporting	4–1	Paide Linnanaiskond	2nd	2022–23
Estonia	2026 Estonian Women's Super Cup	Saku Sporting	1–0	Flora	1st	—N/a
Faroe Islands	2026 Faroese Women's Super Cup	KÍ	3–0	HB	5th	2025
Germany	2025–26 DFB-Pokal Frauen	Bayern Munich	4–0	VfL Wolfsburg	3rd	2024–25
Germany	2026 DFB-Supercup Frauen	Bayern Munich	3–0	VfL Wolfsburg	3rd	2025
Iceland	2026 Icelandic Women's Football League Cup	Breiðablik	3–1	FH	9th	2022
Israel	2025–26 Israeli Women's Cup	Kiryat Gat	3–2	Maccabi K. Hadera	6th	2024–25
Latvia	2026 Latvian Women's Super Cup	SFK Rīga	3–0	Rīgas FS	2nd	2025
Luxembourg	2025–26 Luxembourg Women's Cup	Racing Union	3–1	Differdange 03	5th	2024–25
Moldova	2025–26 Moldovan Women's Cup	Zimbru Chișinău	2–0	Agarista Anenii Noi	1st	—N/a
Netherlands	2025–26 KNVB Women's Cup	FC Twente	2–2 (a.e.t.) (4–3 p)	PSV	5th	2023–24
Netherlands	2025–26 Eredivisie Cup	PSV	3–0	Ajax	2nd	2024–25
Poland	2025–26 Polish Women's Cup	GKS Katowice	5–2 (a.e.t.)	Czarni Sosnowiec	2nd	2023–24
Republic of Ireland	2026 Women's President of Ireland's Cup	Athlone Town AFC	1–0	Shelbourne	3rd	2024
Scotland	2025–26 Women's Scottish Cup	Celtic	2–1	Rangers WFC	3rd	2022–23
Scotland	2025–26 Scottish Women's Premier League Cup	Glasgow City	2–1	Rangers WFC	10th	2019
Serbia	2025–26 Serbian Women's Cup	Red Star Belgrade	2–0	Spartak Subotica	4th	2024–25
Slovakia	2025–26 Slovak Women's Cup	FC Spartak Trnava	3–0	Slovan Bratislava	4th	2024–25
Slovenia	2025–26 Slovenian Women's Cup	Mura	2–0	Radomlje	12th	2023–24
Spain	2025–26 Copa de la Reina de Fútbol	Barcelona	3–1	Atlético Madrid	12th	2024–25
Spain	2025–26 Supercopa de España Femenina	Barcelona	2–0	Real Madrid	6th	2024–25
Sweden	2025–26 Svenska Cupen	Hammarby	1–0 (a.e.t.)	BK Häcken	5th	2024–25
Switzerland	2025–26 Swiss Women's Cup	Servette FC Chênois	1–0	BSC YB Frauen	3rd	2024
Ukraine	2025–26 Ukrainian Women's Cup	Metalist 1925 Kharkiv	1–0	Kolos Kovalivka	12th	2018–19

== Women's Futsal Cups ==
=== CONMEBOL ===
Nation	Cup	Champion	Final score	Second place	Title	Last honour
Argentina	2026 Supercopa de Futsal Femenino AFA	All Boys	4–2	Ferro Carril Oeste	2nd	2025
(Brazil) Brasil	2026 Supercopa de Futsal Feminino	Stein Cascavel	4–0	Barateiro Futsal	3rd	2024

=== UEFA ===
Nation	Cup	Champion	Final score	Second place	Title	Last honour
Hungary	2025–26 Magyar futsalkupa	TFSE	3–2	Tolna-Mözs Futsal	1st	—N/a
Italy	2025–26 Women's Coppa Italia Futsal	C.M.B.	6–0	Okasa Falconara	1st	—N/a
Portugal	2025–26 Taça de Portugal de Futsal Feminino	Benfica	1–0	Nun'Álvares Futsal	10th	2024–25
Spain	2026 Women's Spanish Futsal Cup	Torreblanca Melilla	4–1	Arriva Alcorcón	2nd	2024
Spain	2026 Women's Spanish Futsal Super Cup	Torreblanca Melilla	5–1	Atlético Navalcarnero	1st	—N/a
Slovenia	2025–26 Slovenian Women's Futsal Cup	ŽNK Celje	5–2	ŠD Košana	2nd	2024–25

== Men's national Tier II - X leagues ==
=== AFC ===
Nation	League	Champion	Second place	Title	Last honour
Australia	2026 Australian Championship	TBD – competition in progress			
Bahrain	2025–26 Bahraini Second Division	TBD – competition in progress			
Bangladesh	2025–26 Bangladesh Championship League	Chattogram City	City Club	1st	—N/a
Cambodia	2025–26 Cambodian League 2	TBD – competition in progress			
China	2026 China League One	TBD – competition in progress			
Hong Kong	2025–26 Hong Kong First Division	TBD – competition in progress			
India	2025–26 Indian Football League	Diamond Harbour	Shillong Lajong	1st	—N/a
India	2025–26 I-League 2	Delhi	Bengaluru United	2nd	2022–23
India	2025–26 I-League 3	Banaras Baghpat	Raengdai	1st	—N/a
Indonesia	2025–26 Championship	Garudayaksa	PSS	1st	—N/a
Indonesia	2025–26 Liga Nusantara	RANS Nusantara	Dejan	1st	—N/a
Indonesia	2025–26 Liga 4	TBD – competition in progress			
Iran	2025–26 Azadegan League	TBD – competition in progress			
Iraq	2025–26 Iraqi Premier Division League	Al-Jolan	Ghaz Al-Shamal	1st	—N/a
Japan	J2/J3 100 Year Vision League	Vegalta Sendai	Kataller Toyama	1st	—N/a
Japan	2026 JFL Cup	Okinawa SV	ReinMeer Aomori	1st	—N/a
Japan	2026 Japanese Regional Leagues	TBD – competition in progress			
Jordan	2026 Jordanian First Division League	TBD – competition in progress			
Kuwait	2025–26 Kuwaiti Division One	TBD – competition in progress			
Kyrgyzstan	2026 Kyrgyzstan League Second Level	TBD – competition in progress			
Laos	2025–26 Lao League 2	TBD – competition in progress			
Lebanon	2025–26 Lebanese Second Division	Akhaa Ahli Aley	Tripoli	3rd	2003–04
Lebanon	2025–26 Lebanese Third Division	Ghad Afdal	Ijtimaii	1st	—N/a
Macau	2026 2ª Divisão de Macau	TBD – competition in progress			
Malaysia	2025–26 Malaysia A1 Semi-Pro League	Johor Darul Ta'zim II	Selangor II	1st	—N/a
Malaysia	2025–26 Malaysia A2 Amateur League	AZM Rovers	USM	1st	—N/a
Maldives	2026 Maldivian Second Division Football Tournament	TBD – competition in progress			
Mongolia	2025–26 Mongolian First League	TBD – competition in progress			
Myanmar	2025–26 MNL-2	Chinland	Myawady	2nd	2024
Nepal	2025–26 B-Division League	TBD – competition in progress			
Oman	2025–26 Oman First Division League	TBD – competition in progress			
Qatar	2025–26 Qatari Second Division	TBD – competition in progress			
Saudi Arabia	2025–26 Saudi First Division League	Abha	Al Faisaly	3rd	2018–19
Saudi Arabia	2025–26 Saudi Second Division League	Al-Saqer	Al-Jeel	1st	—N/a
Saudi Arabia	2025–26 Saudi Third Division	Al-Qwarah	Qilwah	1st	—N/a
Saudi Arabia	2025–26 Saudi Fourth Division	Al-Majd	Al-Oyon	1st	—N/a
Singapore	2026 Singapore Football League 1	TBD – competition not yet started			
Singapore	2026 Singapore Football League 2	TBD – competition not yet started			
Singapore	2026 Island Wide League	Tiong Bahru	Jurong City	1st	—N/a
Sri Lanka	2026 Sri Lanka Champions League	TBD – competition in progress			
South Korea	2026 K League 2	TBD – competition in progress			
Syria	2025–26 Syrian League 1st Division	TBD – competition in progress			
(Chinese Taipei) Taiwan	2025–26 Taiwan Football League 2	Kaohsiung Attackers	Sunny Bank AC Taipei Reserves	1st	—N/a
Tajikistan	2026 Tajikistan First League	TBD – competition in progress			
Thailand	2025–26 Thai League 2	Rasisalai United	Sisaket United	1st	—N/a
Thailand	2025–26 Thai League 3	Nara United	Uttaradit	1st	—N/a
Thailand	2026 Thailand Semi-pro League	MNK	Ayutthaya PK	1st	—N/a
Timor-Leste	2026 Liga Futebol Timor-Leste Segunda Divisão	TBD – competition in progress			
Turkmenistan	2025 Birinji Liga	TBD – competition in progress			
United Arab Emirates	2025–26 UAE Division 1	TBD – competition in progress			
Uzbekistan	2026 Uzbekistan Pro League	TBD – competition in progress			
Vietnam	2025–26 V.League 2	Trường Tươi Đồng Nai	Bắc Ninh	1st	—N/a
Vietnam	2026 Vietnamese Football League Second Division	Hà Nội B	Lâm Đồng	1st	—N/a
Vietnam	2026 Vietnamese Football League Second Division	Huế	Lâm Đồng	2nd	2013
Vietnam	2026 Vietnamese Football League Third Division	TBD – competition not yet started			

=== CAF ===
Nation	Tier	League	Champion	Second place	Title	Last honour
Algeria	Tier II	2025–26 Algerian League 2	Group Centre-east: US Biskra	US Chaouia	1st	—N/a
Algeria	Tier II	2025–26 Algerian League 2	Group Centre-west: JS El Biar	USM El Harrach	1st	—N/a
Algeria	Tier III	2025–26 Interregional League	Group South West A: SC Mecheria	Amel Aïn Sefra	2nd	2021–2022
Algeria	Tier III	2025–26 Interregional League	Group South West B: CRB Tindouf	JRB Taghit	1st	—N/a
Algeria	Tier III	2025–26 Interregional League	Group West: IRB Sidi M’hamed Ben Ali		1st	—N/a
Algeria	Tier III	2025–26 Interregional League	Group Centre West: USM Blida			
Algeria	Tier III	2025–26 Interregional League	Group Centre East: JS Azazga	JSM Béjaïa	1st	—N/a
Algeria	Tier III	2025–26 Interregional League	Group East: JSM Skikda	USF Constantine	4th	2014-2015
Algeria	Tier III	2025–26 Interregional League	Group South–east: IRB Nezla			
Egypt	Tier II	2025–26 Egyptian Second Division A	El Qanah	Asyut Petroleum	1st	—N/a
South Africa	Tier II	2025–26 National First Division	Kruger United		1st	—N/a
Tunisia	Tier II	2025–26 Tunisian Ligue Professionnelle 2	Group A: CS Hammam-Lif	Hammam Sousse	8th	2020–21
Tunisia	Tier II	2025–26 Tunisian Ligue Professionnelle 2	Group B: PS Sakiet Eddaïer	Stade Gabèsien	1st	—N/a

=== CONCACAF ===
Nation	League	Champion	Second place	Title	Last honour
Antigua and Barbuda	2025–26 Antigua and Barbuda First Division	Greenbay Hoppers	Freemansville Scorpions	1st	—N/a
Antigua and Barbuda	2025–26 Antigua and Barbuda Second Division	Guydadli Jets	Young Lions FC	1st	—N/a
Aruba	2025–26 Aruban Division Uno	TBD – competition in progress			
Barbados	2026 Barbados Division One	TBD – competition in progress			
Barbados	2026 Barbados Division Two	Zone A:			
Barbados	2026 Barbados Division Two	Zone B:			
Barbados	2026 Barbados Division Two	Zone C:			
Barbados	2026 Barbados Division Two	Zone D:			
Barbados	2026 Barbados Division Three	Zone A:			
Barbados	2026 Barbados Division Three	Zone B:			
Barbados	2026 Barbados Division Three	Zone C:			
Barbados	2026 Barbados Division Three	Zone D:			
Bermuda	2025–26 Bermuda First Division	Somerset Trojans	Robin Hood	1st	—N/a
Canada	2026 Ontario Premier League	TBD – competition in progress			
Canada	2026 Ontario Premier League 2	TBD – competition in progress			
Canada	2026 Ontario Premier League 3	TBD – competition in progress			
Canada	2026 British Columbia Premier League	TBD – competition in progress			
Canada	2026 Alberta Premier League	TBD – competition in progress			
Canada	2026 Prairies Premier League	TBD – competition in progress			
Canada	2026 Ligue 1 Québec	TBD – competition in progress			
Canada	2026 Ligue 2 Québec	TBD – competition in progress			
Canada	2026 Ligue 3 Québec	TBD – competition in progress			
Cayman Islands	2025–26 Cayman Islands First Division	TBD – competition in progress			
Cayman Islands	2025–26 Cayman Islands Second Division	TBD – competition in progress			
Costa Rica	2026 Costa Rican Second Division Clausura	Inter de San Carlos	A.D.R. Jicaral	1st	—N/a
Costa Rica	2026 Costa Rican Second Division Apertura	TBD – competition in progress			
Costa Rica	2026 Costa Rican Third Division Clausura	TBD – Finals on 31 May and 7 June			
Costa Rica	2026 Costa Rican Third Division Apertura	TBD – competition in progress			
Dominica	2026 Dominica First Division	TBD – competition in progress			
El Salvador	2026 Torneo Clausura	CD Inca	Sensunte Cabañas	1st	—N/a
El Salvador	2026 Torneo Apertura	Competition yet to start			
French Guiana	2025–26 French Guiana Régional 1	TBD – competition in progress			
French Guiana	2025–26 French Guiana Régional 2	TBD – competition in progress			
French Guiana	2025–26 French Guiana Régional 3	TBD – competition in progress			
Grenada	2026 GFA Premier League	TBD – competition in progress			
Grenada	2026 GFA First Division	TBD – competition in progress			
Grenada	2026 GFA Second Division	TBD – competition in progress			
Guadeloupe	2025–26 Guadeloupe Régionale 2	Group A: Juventus de Sainte-Anne	JS Vieux-Habitants	1st	—N/a
Guadeloupe	2025–26 Guadeloupe Régionale 3	Jeunesse De Trois Rivières	AJ Castel	1st	—N/a
Guatemala	2026 Liga Primera Clausura	Deportivo San Pedro	Suchitepéquez	2nd	2008 (A)
Guatemala	2026 Liga Primera División Apertura	Competition yet to start			
Guatemala	2026 Liga Segunda División Clausura	Poptún FC	Deportivo Fraijanes	1st	—N/a
Guatemala	2026 Liga Segunda División Apertura	Competition yet to start			
Guatemala	2026 Liga Tercera División Clausura	TBD – competition in progress			
Guatemala	2026 Liga Tercera División Apertura	Competition yet to start			
Guyana	2026 GFF Elite League	TBD – competition in progress			
Haiti	2026 D1 Special Championship	Violette	Baltimore	9th	2020–21 O
Honduras	2026 Liga Nacional Clausura	Motagua	Marathón	20th	2024 Apertura
Honduras	2026 Liga Nacional Apertura	Competition yet to start			
Jamaica	2025–26 Jamaica Premier League	Portmore United	Cavalier	8th	2018–19
Martinique	2025–26 Martinique Championnat National	TBD – competition in progress			
Mexico	2026 Liga de Expansión MX Clausura	2	TBD – competition in progress		
Mexico	2026 Liga de Expansión MX Apertura	2	TBD – competition starts in August		
Montserrat	2025–26 Montserrat Championship	Not held			
Nicaragua	2026 Liga Primera Clausura	Real Estelí	Diriangén FC	22nd	2022–23
Nicaragua	2026 Liga Primera Apertura	TBD – competition in progress			
Panama	2026 Liga Panameña Clasura	Plaza Amador	Alianza	10th	2025 Clausura
Panama	2026 Liga Panameña Apertura	Competition yet to start			
Puerto Rico	2026 Liga Puerto Rico	TBD – competition in progress			
Saint Kitts and Nevis	2026 SKNFA Premier League	United Old Road Jets FC	St. Peters Strikers FC	1st	—N/a
Saint Lucia	2026 Saint Lucia Premier League	TBD – competition in progress			
(Collectivity of Saint Martin) Saint Martin	2025–26 Saint-Martin Senior League	TBD – competition in progress			
Saint Vincent and the Grenadines	2026 Vincy Soccer Premier League	TBD – competition in progress			
Sint Maarten	2025–26 Sint Maarten Premier League	SCSA Eagles	758 Boyz SC	5th	2024-25
Suriname	2025-26 Suriname Major League	Broki	Robinhood	1st	—N/a
Trinidad and Tobago	2025–26 TT Premier Football League	Defence Force	Club Sando	26th	2024-25
(Turks and Caicos Islands) Turks and Caicos	2025–26 Provo Premier League	Academy Eagles	SWA Sharks FC	8th	2023-24
United States	2026 USL Championship	TBD – competition in progress			
United States	2026 MLS Next Pro season	TBD – competition in progress			
United States	2026 USL League One	TBD – competition in progress			
(United States Virgin Islands) US Virgin Islands	2026 USVISF Premier League season	Competition starting in June			

=== CONMEBOL ===
Nation	Tier	League	Champion	Second place	Title	Last honour
Argentina	II Tier	2026 Primera Nacional	Godoy Cruz	Tristán Suárez	2nd	2005–06
Argentina	III Tier	2026 Primera B Metropolitana	TBD – competition in progress			
Argentina	III Tier	2026 Torneo Federal A	TBD – competition in progress			
Argentina	IV Tier	2026 Primera C Metropolitana	TBD – competition in progress			
Argentina	V Tier	2026 Torneo Promocional Amateur	TBD – competition in progress			
Bolivia	II Tier	2026 Copa Simón Bolívar	TBD – competition in progress			
Brazil	II Tier	2026 Série B	TBD – competition in progress			
Brazil	III Tier	2026 Série C	TBD – competition in progress			
Brazil	IV Tier	2026 Série D	TBD – competition in progress			
Brazil	State football leagues (V Tier)	2026 Campeonato Acreano	Santa Cruz (AC)	Rio Branco	1st	—N/a
Brazil	State football leagues (V Tier)	2026 Campeonato Alagoano	CRB	ASA	36th	2025
Brazil	State football leagues (V Tier)	2026 Campeonato Amapaense	Santos (AP)	São José (AP)	8th	2019
Brazil	State football leagues (V Tier)	2026 Campeonato Amazonense	Nacional	Amazonas	44th	2015
Brazil	State football leagues (V Tier)	2026 Campeonato Baiano	Bahia	Vitória	52nd	2025
Brazil	State football leagues (V Tier)	2026 Campeonato Cearense	Fortaleza	Ceará	47nd	2023
Brazil	State football leagues (V Tier)	2026 Campeonato Brasiliense	Gama	Sobradinho	15th	2025
Brazil	State football leagues (V Tier)	2026 Campeonato Capixaba	Porto Vitória	Serra	1st	—N/a
Brazil	State football leagues (V Tier)	2026 Campeonato Goiano	Goiás	Atlético Goianiense	29th	2018
Brazil	State football leagues (V Tier)	2026 Campeonato Maranhense	IAPE	Maranhão	1st	—N/a
Brazil	State football leagues (V Tier)	2026 Campeonato Mato-Grossense	Mixto	Luverdense	25th	2008
Brazil	State football leagues (V Tier)	2026 Campeonato Sul-Mato-Grossense	Operário (MS)	Bataguassu	15th	2025
Brazil	State football leagues (V Tier)	2026 Campeonato Mineiro	Cruzeiro	Atlético Mineiro	39th	2019
Brazil	State football leagues (V Tier)	2026 Campeonato Paraense	Paysandu	Remo	51st	2024
Brazil	State football leagues (V Tier)	2026 Campeonato Paraibano	Botafogo (PB)	Sousa	31th	2019
Brazil	State football leagues (V Tier)	2026 Campeonato Paranaense	Operário Ferroviário	Londrina	3rd	2025
Brazil	State football leagues (V Tier)	2026 Campeonato Pernambucano	Sport Recife	Náutico	46th	2025
Brazil	State football leagues (V Tier)	2026 Campeonato Piauiense	Piauí	Atlético Piauiense	7th	2025
Brazil	State football leagues (V Tier)	2026 Campeonato Carioca	Flamengo	Fluminense	40th	2025
Brazil	State football leagues (V Tier)	2026 Campeonato Potiguar	América (RN)	ABC	40th	2025
Brazil	State football leagues (V Tier)	2026 Campeonato Gaúcho	Grêmio	Internacional	44th	2024
Brazil	State football leagues (V Tier)	2026 Campeonato Rondoniense	Guaporé	Rondoniense	1st	—N/a
Brazil	State football leagues (V Tier)	2026 Campeonato Roraimense	GAS	Baré	3rd	2025
Brazil	State football leagues (V Tier)	2026 Campeonato Catarinense	Barra	Chapecoense	1st	—N/a
Brazil	State football leagues (V Tier)	2026 Campeonato Paulista	Palmeiras	Grêmio Novorizontino	27th	2024
Brazil	State football leagues (V Tier)	2026 Campeonato Sergipano	Sergipe	Confiança	37th	2022
Brazil	State football leagues (V Tier)	2026 Campeonato Tocantinense	Tocantinópolis	União AC	8th	2023
Brazil	State football 2nd leagues (VI Tier)	2026 Campeonato Acreano Série B	TBD – competition in progress			
Brazil	State football 2nd leagues (VI Tier)	2026 Campeonato Alagoano Second Division	Final match on 31 May			
Brazil	State football 2nd leagues (VI Tier)	2026 Campeonato Amapaense Série B	TBD – competition in progress			
Brazil	State football 2nd leagues (VI Tier)	2026 Campeonato Amazonense Série B	TBD – competition in progress			
Brazil	State football 2nd leagues (VI Tier)	2026 Campeonato Baiano Second Division	TBD – competition in progress			
Brazil	State football 2nd leagues (VI Tier)	2026 Campeonato Cearense Série B	TBD – competition in progress			
Brazil	State football 2nd leagues (VI Tier)	2026 Campeonato Brasiliense Second Division	TBD – competition in progress			
Brazil	State football 2nd leagues (VI Tier)	2026 Campeonato Capixaba Série B	TBD – competition in progress			
Brazil	State football 2nd leagues (VI Tier)	2026 Campeonato Goiano Second Division	TBD – competition in progress			
Brazil	State football 2nd leagues (VI Tier)	2026 Campeonato Maranhense Série B	TBD – competition in progress			
Brazil	State football 2nd leagues (VI Tier)	2026 Campeonato Mato-Grossense Second Division	TBD – competition in progress			
Brazil	State football 2nd leagues (VI Tier)	2026 Campeonato Sul-Mato-Grossense Série B	TBD – competition in progress			
Brazil	State football 2nd leagues (VI Tier)	2026 Campeonato Mineiro Módulo II	TBD – competition in progress			
Brazil	State football 2nd leagues (VI Tier)	2026 Campeonato Paraense Série A2	TBD – competition in progress			
Brazil	State football 2nd leagues (VI Tier)	2026 Campeonato Paraibano Second Division	TBD – competition in progress			
Brazil	State football 2nd leagues (VI Tier)	2026 Campeonato Paranaense Second Division	TBD – competition in progress			
Brazil	State football 2nd leagues (VI Tier)	2026 Campeonato Pernambucano Série A2	TBD – competition in progress			
Brazil	State football 2nd leagues (VI Tier)	2026 Campeonato Piauiense Second Division	TBD – competition in progress			
Brazil	State football 2nd leagues (VI Tier)	2026 Campeonato Carioca Série A2	TBD – competition in progress			
Brazil	State football 2nd leagues (VI Tier)	2026 Campeonato Potiguar Second Division	TBD – competition in progress			
Brazil	State football 2nd leagues (VI Tier)	2026 Campeonato Gaúcho Série A2	TBD – competition in progress			
Brazil	State football 2nd leagues (VI Tier)	2026 Campeonato Rondoniense Second Division	TBD – competition in progress			
Brazil	State football 2nd leagues (VI Tier)	2026 Campeonato Catarinense Série B	TBD – competition in progress			
Brazil	State football 2nd leagues (VI Tier)	2026 Campeonato Paulista Série A2	Juventus (SP)	Ferroviária	3rd	2005
Brazil	State football 2nd leagues (VI Tier)	2026 Campeonato Sergipano Série A2	TBD – competition in progress			
Brazil	State football 2nd leagues (VI Tier)	2026 Campeonato Tocantinense Second Division	TBD – competition in progress			
Brazil	State football 3rd leagues (VII Tier)	2026 Campeonato Cearense Série C	TBD – competition in progress			
Brazil	State football 3rd leagues (VII Tier)	2026 Campeonato Goiano Third Divisionn	TBD – competition in progress			
Brazil	State football 3rd leagues (VII Tier)	2026 Campeonato Mineiro Segunda Divisão	TBD – competition in progress			
Brazil	State football 3rd leagues (VII Tier)	2026 Campeonato Paraense Série A3	TBD – competition in progress			
Brazil	State football 3rd leagues (VII Tier)	2026 Campeonato Paraibano Third Division	TBD – competition in progress			
Brazil	State football 3rd leagues (VII Tier)	2026 Campeonato Paranaense Third Division	TBD – competition in progress			
Brazil	State football 3rd leagues (VII Tier)	2026 Campeonato Carioca Série B1	TBD – competition in progress			
Brazil	State football 3rd leagues (VII Tier)	2026 Campeonato Gaúcho Série B	TBD – competition in progress			
Brazil	State football 3rd leagues (VII Tier)	2026 Campeonato Catarinense Série C	TBD – competition in progress			
Brazil	State football 3rd leagues (VII Tier)	2026 Campeonato Paulista Série A3	Portuguesa Santista	Marília	1st	—N/a
Brazil	State football 3rd leagues (VII Tier)	2026 Campeonato Sergipano Série A3	TBD – competition in progress			
Chile	II Tier	2026 Liga de Ascenso	Cobreloa	San Luis	2nd	2023
Chile	III Tier	2026 Segunda División Profesional	TBD – competition in progress			
Colombia	II Tier	2026 Torneo DIMAYOR	TBD – competition in progress			
Colombia	III Tier	2026 Categoría Primera C	TBD – competition in progress			
Ecuador	II Tier	2026 Serie B	TBD – competition in progress			
Ecuador	III Tier	2026 Segunda Categoría	TBD – competition in progress			
Paraguay	II Tier	2026 División Intermedia	Deportivo Santaní	General Caballero (JLM)	1st	—N/a
Paraguay	III Tier	2026 Primera División B Metropolitana	TBD – competition in progress			
Paraguay	III Tier	2026 Primera División B Nacional	TBD – competition in progress			
Paraguay	IV Tier	2026 Primera División C	TBD – competition in progress			
Peru	II Tier	2026 Liga 2	TBD – competition in progress			
Peru	III Tier	2026 Liga 3	TBD – competition in progress			
Peru	IV Tier	2026 Tradición Copera	TBD – competition in progress			
Peru	IV Tier	2026 Copa Perú	TBD – competition in progress			
Uruguay	II Tier	2026 Segunda División	TBD – competition in progress			
Uruguay	III Tier	2026 Primera Divisional C	TBD – competition in progress			
Uruguay	IV Tier	2026 Divisional D AUF	TBD – competition in progress			
Venezuela	II Tier	2026 Liga FUTVE 2	TBD – competition in progress			
Venezuela	III Tier	2026 Liga FUTVE 3	TBD – competition in progress			

=== OFC ===
Nation	Tier	League	Champion	Second place	Title	Last honour
New Zealand	II Tier	2026 Northern League	Birkenhead United	Eastern Suburbs	1st	—N/a
New Zealand	II Tier	2026 Central League	Napier City Rovers	Wellington Olympic	4th	2018
New Zealand	II Tier	2026 Southern League	Cashmere Technical	Ferrymead Bays	3rd	2024
New Zealand	III Tier	2026 NRFL Leagues	(Championship) Northern Rovers	Takapuna	1st	—N/a
New Zealand	III Tier	2026 Central League 2	Taradale	North Wellington	1st	—N/a
New Zealand	III Tier	2026 Nelson Bays Premiership	FC Nelson	Rangers AFC	7th	2025
New Zealand	III Tier	2026 Canterbury Premiership	Nomads United Reserves	Halswell United	3rd	2007
New Zealand	III Tier	2026 Southern Premiership	Northern Hearts	Mosgiel	1st	—N/a
New Zealand	IV Tier	2026 NRFL Leagues	(Northern Conference) Bucklands Beach	Metro	1st	—N/a
New Zealand	IV Tier	2026 NRFL Leagues	(Southern Conference) Ngaruawahia United	Papamoa	1st	—N/a
New Zealand	IV Tier	2026 Central Federation League	(Eastern Premiership) Gisborne United	Havelock North Wanderers	1st	—N/a
New Zealand	IV Tier	2026 Central Federation League	(Western Premiership) Whanganui Athletic	Levin	1st	—N/a
New Zealand	IV Tier	2026 Capital Premier	Greytown	Wellington Phoenix U18's	1st	—N/a
New Zealand	IV Tier	2026 Canterbury Championship	Coastal Spirit Reserves	Ferrymead Bays Keen Lads	1st	—N/a
New Zealand	IV Tier	2026 Fletcher Cup	Roslyn Wakari Reserves	Northern Thirds	5th	2022
New Zealand	IV Tier	2026 Donald Gray Cup	Winton	Old Boys'	2nd	2025
New Zealand	IV Tier	2026 South Canterbury Div 1	Timaru United	Timaru Boys' High School	1st	—N/a

=== UEFA ===
Nation	Tier	League	Champion	Second place	Title	Last honour
Albania	II Tier	2025–26 Kategoria e Parë	Laçi	Skënderbeu	3rd	2008–09
Albania	III Tier	2025–26 Kategoria e Dytë	Besëlidhja	Oriku	2nd	1957
Albania	IV Tier	2025–26 Kategoria e Tretë	Vllaznia B	Albpetrol	1st	—N/a
Andorra	II Tier	2025–26 Segona Divisió	Casa de Portugal	Sporting Club d'Escaldes	1st	—N/a
Armenia	II Tier	2025–26 Armenian First League	TBD – competition in progress			
Austria	II Tier	2025–26 Austrian Football Second League	SC Austria Lustenau	SKN St. Pölten	3rd	2021–22
Austria	III Tier	2025–26 Austrian Regionalliga	West Region: FC Wacker Innsbruck	SV Kuchl	2nd	1963–64
Austria	III Tier	2025–26 Austrian Regionalliga	Center Region: ASK Voitsberg	Union Gurten	2nd	2023–24
Austria	III Tier	2025–26 Austrian Regionalliga	East Region: SV Gloggnitz	SC-ESV Parndorf 1919	1st	—N/a
Austria	IV Tier	2025–26 Austrian Landesliga	Burgenland: Mattersburger SV 2020	SV Leithaprodersdorf	1st	—N/a
Austria	IV Tier	2025–26 Austrian Landesliga	Niederösterreich: USV Scheiblingkirchen-Warth	Admira Wacker II	2nd	2021–22
Austria	IV Tier	2025–26 Austrian Landesliga	Wiener Stadtliga:	TBD – competition in progress		
Austria	IV Tier	2025–26 Austrian Landesliga	Kärntner Liga:	TBD – competition in progress		
Austria	IV Tier	2025–26 Austrian Landesliga	OÖ Liga:	TBD – competition in progress		
Austria	IV Tier	2025–26 Austrian Landesliga	Landesliga Steiermark:	TBD – competition in progress		
Austria	IV Tier	2025–26 Austrian Landesliga	Salzburger Liga:	TBD – competition in progress		
Austria	IV Tier	2025–26 Austrian Landesliga	Tiroler Liga:	TBD – competition in progress		
Austria	IV Tier	2025–26 Austrian Landesliga	Vorarlbergliga:	TBD – competition in progress		
Azerbaijan	II Tier	2025–26 Azerbaijan First Division	TBD – competition in progress			
Belarus	II Tier	2026 Belarusian First League	TBD – competition in progress			
Belarus	III Tier	2026 Belarusian Second League	TBD – competition in progress			
Belgium	II Tier	2025–26 Challenger Pro League	Beveren	Kortrijk	1st	—N/a
Belgium	III Tier	2025–26 Belgian Division 1	Belgian Division VV: Hasselt	Knokke	1st	—N/a
Belgium	III Tier	2025–26 Belgian Division 1	Belgian Division ACFF: Virton	Mons	2nd	2018–19
Belgium	IV Tier	2025–26 Belgian Division 2	Belgian Division 2 VV A: Mandel United	Diksmuide-Oostende	1st	—N/a
Belgium	IV Tier	2025–26 Belgian Division 2	Belgian Division 2 VV B: Heist	Londerzeel	1st	—N/a
Belgium	IV Tier	2025–26 Belgian Division 2	Belgian Division 2 ACFF: Onhaye	Ganshoren	1st	—N/a
Belgium	V Tier	2025–26 Belgian Division 3	Belgian Division 3 VV A: Overijse	Voorde-Appelterre	2nd	2022–23
Belgium	V Tier	2025–26 Belgian Division 3	Belgian Division 3 VV B: De Kempen	Wilrijk	1st	—N/a
Belgium	V Tier	2025–26 Belgian Division 3	Belgian Division 3 ACFF A: Stade Mouscronnois	St-Ghislain Tertre Hautrage	1st	—N/a
Belgium	V Tier	2025–26 Belgian Division 3	Belgian Division 3 ACFF B: Eupen U23	Verlaine	1st	—N/a
Bosnia and Herzegovina	II Tier	2025–26 First League of the Federation of Bosnia and Herzegovina	Čelik Zenica		1st	—N/a
Bosnia and Herzegovina	II Tier	2025–26 First League of the Republika Srpska	BSK Banja Luka	Laktaši	1st	—N/a
Bosnia and Herzegovina	III Tier	2025–26 Second League of the Federation of Bosnia and Herzegovina	Center: Rudar Kakanj	Bosna Visoko	2nd	2024–25
Bosnia and Herzegovina	III Tier	2025–26 Second League of the Federation of Bosnia and Herzegovina	West:			
Bosnia and Herzegovina	III Tier	2025–26 Second League of the Federation of Bosnia and Herzegovina	North: Zvijezda Gradačac		2nd	2005–06
Bosnia and Herzegovina	III Tier	2025–26 Second League of the Federation of Bosnia and Herzegovina	South: Čapljina		3rd	2009–10
Bosnia and Herzegovina	III Tier	2025–26 Second League of the Republika Srpska	East: Majevica Lopare	Ilićka 01	1st	—N/a
Bosnia and Herzegovina	III Tier	2025–26 Second League of the Republika Srpska	West: Potkozarje Aleksandrovac	Ljubić Prnjavor	1st	—N/a
Bulgaria	II Tier	2025–26 Second Professional Football League	Dunav Ruse	Yantra	2nd	2015–16
Bulgaria	III Tier	2025–26 Third Amateur Football League	North-East Group: Chernomorets Balchik	Ludogorets III	4th	2022–23
Bulgaria	III Tier	2025–26 Third Amateur Football League	South-East Group: Nesebar	Maritsa Plovdiv	7th	2023–24
Bulgaria	III Tier	2025–26 Third Amateur Football League	North-West Group: Lokomotiv Mezdra	Akademik Svishtov	1st	—N/a
Bulgaria	III Tier	2025–26 Third Amateur Football League	South-West Group: Rilski Sportist	Strumska Slava	1st	—N/a
Croatia	II Tier	2025–26 First Football League	Rudeš	Cibalia	3rd	2022–23
Cyprus	II Tier	2025–26 Cypriot Second Division	Nea Salamis Famagusta	Karmiotissa	5th	2003–04
Czech Republic	II Tier	2025–26 Czech National Football League	Zbrojovka Brno	Táborsko	2nd	2021–22
Czech Republic	III Tier	2025–26 Bohemian Football League				
Czech Republic	III Tier	2025–26 Moravian-Silesian Football League				
Czech Republic	IV Tier	2025–26 Czech Fourth Division	Group A:			
Czech Republic	IV Tier	2025–26 Czech Fourth Division	Group B:			
Czech Republic	IV Tier	2025–26 Czech Fourth Division	Group C:			
Czech Republic	IV Tier	2025–26 Czech Fourth Division	Group D:			
Czech Republic	IV Tier	2025–26 Czech Fourth Division	Group E:			
Czech Republic	V Tier	2025–26 Czech regional championships	Prague:			
Czech Republic	V Tier	2025–26 Czech regional championships	Central Bohemian:			
Czech Republic	V Tier	2025–26 Czech regional championships	South Bohemian:			
Czech Republic	V Tier	2025–26 Czech regional championships	Plzeň:			
Czech Republic	V Tier	2025–26 Czech regional championships	Karlovy Vary:			
Czech Republic	V Tier	2025–26 Czech regional championships	Ústí nad Labem:			
Czech Republic	V Tier	2025–26 Czech regional championships	Liberec:			
Czech Republic	V Tier	2025–26 Czech regional championships	Hradec Králové:			
Czech Republic	V Tier	2025–26 Czech regional championships	Pardubice:			
Czech Republic	V Tier	2025–26 Czech regional championships	Vysočina:			
Czech Republic	V Tier	2025–26 Czech regional championships	South Moravian:			
Czech Republic	V Tier	2025–26 Czech regional championships	Olomouc:			
Czech Republic	V Tier	2025–26 Czech regional championships	Zlín:			
Czech Republic	V Tier	2025–26 Czech regional championships	Moravian-Silesian:			
Denmark	II Tier	2025–26 Danish 1st Division	Lyngby BK	AC Horsens	3rd	2015–16
Denmark	III Tier	2025–26 Danish 2nd Division	Akademisk Boldklub	Vendsyssel	3rd	2015–16
Denmark	IV Tier	2025–26 Danish 3rd Division	Nykøbing FC	FA 2000	1st	—N/a
Denmark	V Tier	2025–26 Denmark Series	TBD – competition in progress			
England	II Tier	2025–26 EFL Championship	Coventry City	Ipswich Town	2nd	1966–67
England	III Tier	2025–26 EFL League One	Lincoln City	Cardiff City	4th	1951–52
England	IV Tier	2025–26 EFL League Two	Bromley	Milton Keynes Dons	1st	—N/a
England	V Tier	2025–26 National League	York City	Winner of play-off: Rochdale	1st	—N/a
England	VI Tier	2025–26 National League North	Fylde	Winner of play-off: Kidderminster Harriers	2nd	2022–23
England	VI Tier	2025–26 National League South	Worthing	Winner of play-off: Hornchurch	1st	—N/a
England	VII Tier	2025–26 Northern Premier League Premier Division	Hebburn Town	Winner of play-off: Hednesford Town	1st	—N/a
England	VII Tier	2025–26 Southern Football League Premier Division Central	Harborough Town	Winner of play-off: Spalding United	1st	—N/a
England	VII Tier	2025–26 Southern Football League Premier Division South	Walton & Hersham	Winner of play-off: Farnham Town	1st	—N/a
England	VII Tier	2025–26 Isthmian League	Folkestone Invicta	Winner of play-off: Billericay Town	1st	—N/a
England	VIII Tier	2025–26 Northern Premier League Division One East	Redcar Athletic	Winner of play-off: Emley	1st	—N/a
England	VIII Tier	2025–26 Northern Premier League Division One Midlands	Anstey Nomads	Winner of play-off: Racing Club Warwick	1st	—N/a
England	VIII Tier	2025–26 Northern Premier League Division One West	Bury	Winner of play-off: Avro	1st	—N/a
England	VIII Tier	2025–26 Southern Football League Division One Central	Leighton Town	Winner of play-off: Hitchin Town	1st	—N/a
England	VIII Tier	2025–26 Southern Football League Division One South	Frome Town	Winner of play-off: Malvern Town	1st	—N/a
England	VIII Tier	2025–26 Isthmian League North Division	Maldon & Tiptree	Winner of play-off: Stanway Rovers	2nd	2019–20
England	VIII Tier	2025–26 Isthmian League South Central Division	Leatherhead	Winner of play-off: Hanworth Villa	1st	—N/a
England	VIII Tier	2025–26 Isthmian League South East Division	Three Bridges	Winner of play-off: AFC Whyteleafe	1st	—N/a
England	IX Tier	2025–26 Northern Football League Division One	Guisborough Town	Winner of play-off: West Auckland Town	1st	—N/a
England	IX Tier	2025–26 Northern Counties East Football League Premier Division	Liversedge	Winner of play-off: Beverley Town	1st	—N/a
England	IX Tier	2025–26 North West Counties Football League Premier Division	Wythenshawe	Winner of play-off: Padiham	2nd	2023–24
England	IX Tier	2025–26 Midland Football League Premier Division	Hanley Town	Winner of play-off: 1874 Northwich	2nd	2021–22
England	IX Tier	2025–26 United Counties League Premier Division North	Boston Town	Winner of play-off: Grantham Town	2nd	1994–95
England	IX Tier	2025–26 United Counties League Premier Division South	Nuneaton Town	Winner of play-off: Coventry United	1st	—N/a
England	IX Tier	2025–26 Hellenic Football League Premier Division	Slimbridge	Winner of play-off: Worcester Raiders	2nd	2006–07
England	IX Tier	2025–26 Spartan South Midlands Football League Premier Division	Haringey Borough	Winner of play-off: Winslow United	1st	—N/a
England	IX Tier	2025–26 Western Football League Premier Division	Barnstaple Town	Winner of play-off: Paulton Rovers	3rd	1979–80
England	IX Tier	2025–26 Wessex Football League Premier Division	A.F.C. Stoneham	Winner of play-off: Portland United	1st	—N/a
England	IX Tier	2025–26 Combined Counties Football League Premier Division North	Ashford Town (Middlesex)	Winner of play-off: Windsor & Eton	1st	—N/a
England	IX Tier	2025–26 Combined Counties Football League Premier Division South	Cobham	Winner of play-off: Horley Town	1st	—N/a
England	IX Tier	2025–26 Eastern Counties Football League Premier Division	Mulbarton Wanderers	Winner of play-off: Fakenham Town	1st	—N/a
England	IX Tier	2025–26 Essex Senior Football League	Little Oakley	Winner of play-off: Buckhurst Hill	1st	—N/a
England	IX Tier	2025–26 Southern Combination Football League Premier Division	Steyning Town	Winner of play-off: Peacehaven & Telscombe	5th	2023–24
England	IX Tier	2025–26 Southern Counties East Football League Premier Division	Whitstable Town	Play-off winner: Punjab United	2nd	2006–07
England	X Tier	2025–26 Northern Football League Division Two	Redcar Town	Winner of play-off: Yarm & Eaglescliffe	1st	—N/a
England	X Tier	2025–26 Northern Counties East Football League Division One	Dearne & District	Winner of play-off: Worsbrough Bridge Athletic	1st	—N/a
England	X Tier	2025–26 North West Counties Football League First Division North	Nelson	Winner of play-off: Droylsden	2nd	2013–14
England	X Tier	2025–26 North West Counties Football League First Division South	Runcorn Town	Winner of play-off: Stockport Georgians	1st	—N/a
England	X Tier	2025–26 Midland Football League Division One	Knowle	Winner of play-off: Sutton United	1st	—N/a
England	X Tier	2025–26 United Counties League Division One	Retford	Winner of play-off: Retford United	1st	—N/a
England	X Tier	2025–26 Hellenic Football League Division One	FC Stratford	Winner of play-off: Malmesbury Victoria	1st	—N/a
England	X Tier	2025–26 Spartan South Midlands Football League Division One	Everett Rovers	Winner of play-off: Desborough Town	1st	—N/a
England	X Tier	2025–26 Wessex Football League Division One	Fleetlands	Winner of play-off: Yateley United	1st	—N/a
England	X Tier	2025–26 Western Football League First Division	Devizes Town	Winner of play-off: Sturminster Newton United	2nd	1999–2000
England	X Tier	2025–26 South West Peninsula League Premier Division East	Bovey Tracey	Bridport	1st	—N/a
England	X Tier	2025–26 South West Peninsula League Premier Division West	Liskeard Athletic	Elburton Villa	1st	—N/a
England	X Tier	2025–26 Combined Counties Football League Division One	Penn & Tylers Green	Winner of play-off: Bedfont	1st	—N/a
England	X Tier	2025–26 Eastern Counties Football League Division One North	Kings Park Rangers	Winner of play-off: FC Peterborough	1st	—N/a
England	X Tier	2025–26 Eastern Counties Football League Division One South	Hutton	Winner of play-off: Clapton Community	1st	—N/a
England	X Tier	2025–26 Southern Combination Football League Division One	Godalming Town	Winner of play-off: Billingshurst	1st	—N/a
England	X Tier	2025–26 Southern Counties East Football League First Division	AFC Greenwich Borough	Winner of play-off: SE Dons	1st	—N/a
Estonia	II Tier	2026 Esiliiga	TBD – competition in progress			
Estonia	III Tier	2026 Esiliiga B	TBD – competition in progress			
Estonia	IV Tier	2026 II Liiga	North-West:			
Estonia	IV Tier	2026 II Liiga	North-East:			
Estonia	IV Tier	2026 II Liiga	South-East:			
Estonia	V Tier	2026 III Liiga	TBD – competition in progress			
Estonia	VI Tier	2026 IV Liiga	TBD – competition in progress			
Faroe Islands	II Tier	2026 1. deild	TBD – competition in progress			
Finland	II Tier	2026 Ykkösliiga	TBD – competition in progress			
France	II Tier	2025–26 Ligue 2	Troyes	Le Mans	3rd	2020–21
France	III Tier	2025–26 Championnat National	Dijon	Sochaux-Montbéliard	1st	—N/a
France	IV Tier	2025–26 Championnat National 2	Group A: VFC La Roche-sur-Yon	Girondins de Bordeaux	1st	—N/a
France	IV Tier	2025–26 Championnat National 2	Group B: US Thionville Lusitanos	Bourges	1st	—N/a
France	IV Tier	2025–26 Championnat National 2	Group C: AS Cannes	Nîmes Olympique	1st	—N/a
France	V Tier	2025–26 Championnat National 3	Group A:	TBD – competition in progress		
France	V Tier	2025–26 Championnat National 3	Group B:	TBD – competition in progress		
France	V Tier	2025–26 Championnat National 3	Group C:	TBD – competition in progress		
France	V Tier	2025–26 Championnat National 3	Group D:	TBD – competition in progress		
France	V Tier	2025–26 Championnat National 3	Group E:	TBD – competition in progress		
France	V Tier	2025–26 Championnat National 3	Group F:	TBD – competition in progress		
France	V Tier	2025–26 Championnat National 3	Group G:	TBD – competition in progress		
France	V Tier	2025–26 Championnat National 3	Group H:	TBD – competition in progress		
(Georgia (country)) Georgia	II Tier	2026 Erovnuli Liga 2	TBD – competition in progress			
Germany	II Tier	2025–26 2. Bundesliga	Schalke 04	SV Elversberg	3rd	2021–22
Germany	III Tier	2025–26 3. Liga	Osnabrück	Energie Cottbus	3rd	2018–19
Germany	IV Tier	2025–26 Regionalliga Nord	SV Meppen	Drochtersen/Assel	2nd	2016–17
Germany	IV Tier	2025–26 Regionalliga Nordost	Lokomotive Leipzig	Carl Zeiss Jena	3rd	2024–25
Germany	IV Tier	2025–26 Regionalliga West	Fortuna Köln	Oberhausen	1st	—N/a
Germany	IV Tier	2025–26 Regionalliga Südwest	Sonnenhof Großaspach	SGV Freiberg	2nd	2013–14
Germany	IV Tier	2025–26 Regionalliga Bayern	Nürnberg II	Würzburger Kickers	1st	—N/a
Germany	V Tier	2025–26 Oberliga Baden-Württemberg	Aalen	Mannheim	2nd	1998–99
Germany	V Tier	2025–26 Oberliga Bayern Nord	SC Eltersdorf	ASV Cham	2nd	2020–21
Germany	V Tier	2025–26 Oberliga Bayern Süd	1860 Munich II	TSV Landsberg	1st	—N/a
Germany	V Tier	2025–26 Oberliga Bremen	Blumenthaler SV	SV Hemelingen	1st	—N/a
Germany	V Tier	2025–26 Oberliga Hamburg	ETSV Hamburg	Eimsbütteler TV	1st	—N/a
Germany	V Tier	2025–26 Oberliga Hessen	Eintracht Frankfurt II	FC Eddersheim	1st	—N/a
Germany	V Tier	2025–26 Oberliga Mittelrhein	SV Bergisch Gladbach 09	SV Eintracht Hohkeppel	6th	2018−19
Germany	V Tier	2025–26 Oberliga Niederrhein	VfB 03 Hilden	Germania Ratingen	1st	—N/a
Germany	V Tier	2025–26 Oberliga Niedersachsen	Atlas Delmenhorst	Germania Egestorf	4th	1985–86
Germany	V Tier	2025–26 Oberliga Nordost-Nord	Tasmania Berlin	Lichtenberg 47	2nd	2020–21
Germany	V Tier	2025–26 Oberliga Nordost-Süd	Eintracht Stahnsdorf	SC Freital	1st	—N/a
Germany	V Tier	2025–26 Oberliga Rheinland-Pfalz/Saar	1. FC Kaiserslautern II	FK Pirmasens	4th	2000−01
Germany	V Tier	2025–26 Oberliga Schleswig-Holstein	SV Todesfelde	Holstein Kiel II	4th	2023–24
Germany	V Tier	2025–26 Oberliga Westfalen	Westfalia Rhynern	Wattenscheid 09	1st	—N/a
Greece	Tier II	2025–26 Super League Greece 2	North Group: Iraklis	Niki Volos	2nd	1980–81
Greece	Tier II	2025–26 Super League Greece 2	South Group: Kalamata	Panionios	3rd	1973–74
Greece	Tier III	2025–26 Gamma Ethniki	Group 1: Panthrakikos	Xanthi	2nd	1978–79
Greece	Tier III	2025–26 Gamma Ethniki	Group 2: Apollon Kalamarias	Ethnikos Neo Keramidi	3rd	2012–13 (North Group)
Greece	Tier III	2025–26 Gamma Ethniki	Group 3: Elassona	Aris Filiates	2nd	1976–77
Greece	Tier III	2025–26 Gamma Ethniki	Group 4: Pyrgos	Zakynthos	1st	—N/a
Greece	Tier III	2025–26 Gamma Ethniki	Group 5: Aris Petroupolis	Nea Artaki	1st	—N/a
Greece	Tier III	2025–26 Gamma Ethniki	Group 6: Ethnikos Piraeus	Ionikos	1st	—N/a
Hungary	II Tier	2025–26 Nemzeti Bajnokság II	Vasas	Honvéd	5th	2021–22
Hungary	III Tier	2025–26 Nemzeti Bajnokság III	Southwest group: Nagykanizsa	Pécsi	2nd	2024–25
Hungary	III Tier	2025–26 Nemzeti Bajnokság III	Northeast group: Kisvárda II	Cigánd SE	1st	—N/a
Hungary	III Tier	2025–26 Nemzeti Bajnokság III	Northwest group: Gyirmót	Tatabányai	1st	—N/a
Hungary	III Tier	2025–26 Nemzeti Bajnokság III	Southeast group: Monori	ESMTK Budapest	2nd	2017–18
Iceland	II Tier	2026 1. deild karla	TBD – competition in progress			
Israel	II Tier	2025–26 Liga Leumit	Maccabi Petah Tikva	Hapoel Ramat Gan	6th	2022–23
Italy	II Tier	2025–26 Serie B	Venezia	Frosinone	3rd	1965–66
Italy	III Tier	2025–26 Serie C	Group A (North): LR Vicenza	Union Brescia	3rd	2019–20 (Group B)
Italy	III Tier	2025–26 Serie C	Group B (Centre): Arezzo	Ascoli	3rd	1968–69 (Group B)
Italy	III Tier	2025–26 Serie C	Group C (South): Benevento	Catania	2nd	2015–16 (Group C)
Italy	IV Tier	2025–26 Serie D	Group A: Vado	Ligorna	1st	—N/a
Italy	IV Tier	2025–26 Serie D	Group B: Folgore Caratese	Casatese Merate	1st	—N/a
Italy	IV Tier	2025–26 Serie D	Group C: Treviso	Legnago	4th	2010–11 (Group C)
Italy	IV Tier	2025–26 Serie D	Group D: Desenzano	Lentigione	1st	—N/a
Italy	IV Tier	2025–26 Serie D	Group E: Grosseto	Tau Altopascio	4th	2019–20
Italy	IV Tier	2025–26 Serie D	Group F: Ostia Mare	Ancona	2nd	1988–89
Italy	IV Tier	2025–26 Serie D	Group G: Scafatese	Trastevere	2nd	2006–07
Italy	IV Tier	2025–26 Serie D	Group H: Barletta	Martina	5th	2007–08
Italy	IV Tier	2025–26 Serie D	Group I: Savoia	Nissa	6th	2013–14
Kazakhstan	II Tier	2026 Kazakhstan First Division	TBD – competition in progress			
Kosovo	II Tier	2025–26 First Football League of Kosovo	Group A:	TBD – competition in progress		
Kosovo	II Tier	2025–26 First Football League of Kosovo	Group B:	TBD – competition in progress		
Latvia	II Tier	2026 Future League	TBD – competition in progress			
Lithuania	II Tier	2026 I Lyga	TBD – competition in progress			
Luxembourg	II Tier	2025–26 Luxembourg Division of Honour	US Rumelange	Etzella Ettelbruck	5th	2007–08
Malta	II Tier	2025–26 Maltese Challenge League	Balzan	Winner of play–off: Birżebbuġa St. Peter's	2nd	2010–11
Malta	III Tier	2025–26 Maltese National Amateur League	Attard	Victoria Hotspurs	1st	—N/a
Malta	IV Tier	2025–26 Maltese National Amateur League II	Kalkara	Dingli Swallows	1st	—N/a
Moldova	II Tier	2025–26 Moldovan Liga 1	Politehnica UTM	Winner of play–off: FC Sireți	1st	—N/a
Moldova	III Tier	2025–26 Moldovan Liga 2	North: Vulturii Cutezători	EFA Visoca	1st	—N/a
Moldova	III Tier	2025–26 Moldovan Liga 2	South: Național Ialoveni	Real Succes	1st	—N/a
Montenegro	II Tier	2025–26 Montenegrin Second League	Otrant-Olympic	Grbalj	1st	—N/a
Netherlands	II Tier	2025–26 Eerste Divisie	ADO Den Haag	Cambuur	4th	2002–03
Netherlands	III Tier	2025–26 Tweede Divisie	Quick Boys	Hoek	1st	—N/a
Netherlands	IV Tier	2025–26 Derde Divisie	Group A: ROHDA	DVS '33	1st	—N/a
Netherlands	IV Tier	2025–26 Derde Divisie	Group B: Kloetinge	Lisse	1st	—N/a
Netherlands	V Tier	2025–26 Vierde Divisie	Group A:			
Netherlands	V Tier	2025–26 Vierde Divisie	Group B:			
Netherlands	V Tier	2025–26 Vierde Divisie	Group C:			
Netherlands	V Tier	2025–26 Vierde Divisie	Group D:			
Northern Ireland	II Tier	2025–26 NIFL Championship	Limavady United	Annagh United	2nd	1992–93
Northern Ireland	III Tier	2025–26 NIFL Premier Intermediate League	Moyola Park	Strabane Athletic	2nd	2001–02
North Macedonia	II Tier	2025–26 Macedonian Second Football League	Bregalnica	Skopje	4th	2020–21
Norway	II Tier	2026 Norwegian First Division	TBD – competition starts April 6			
Poland	II Tier	2025–26 I liga	Wisła Kraków	Śląsk Wrocław	2nd	1964–65
Portugal	II Tier	2025–26 Liga Portugal 2	Marítimo	Académico de Viseu	1st	—N/a
Portugal	III Tier	2025–26 Liga 3	Amarante	Académica de Coimbra	1st	—N/a
Portugal	IV Tier	2025–26 Campeonato de Portugal	TBD – competition in progress			
Republic of Ireland	II Tier	2026 League of Ireland First Division	TBD – competition starts March 13			
Romania	II Tier	2025–26 Liga II	Corvinul Hunedoara	Sepsi OSK	5th	1979–80
Russia	II Tier	2025–26 Russian First League	Rodina Moscow	Fakel Voronezh	1st	—N/a
Scotland	II Tier	2025–26 Scottish Championship	St Johnstone	Partick Thistle	8th	2008–09
Scotland	III Tier	2025–26 Scottish League One	Inverness Caledonian Thistle	Stenhousemuir	1st	—N/a
Scotland	IV Tier	2025–26 Scottish League Two	East Kilbride	The Spartans	1st	—N/a
Scotland	V Tier	2025–26 Highland Football League	Brora Rangers	Brechin City	6th	2024–25
Scotland	V Tier	2025–26 Lowland Football League	Linlithgow Rose	Clydebank	1st	—N/a
Scotland	VI Tier	2025–26 North Caledonian Football League	Invergordon	Alness United	9th	2024–25
Scotland	VI Tier	2025–26 North of Scotland Football League	TBD – competition in progress			
Scotland	VI Tier	2025–26 East of Scotland Football League (Premier Division)	Hill of Beath Hawthorn	Musselburgh Athletic	1st	—N/a
Scotland	VI Tier	2025–26 Midlands Football League (Premier Division)	Dundee North End		3rd	2024–25
Scotland	VI Tier	2025–26 South of Scotland Football League	Dalbeattie Star	Stranraer reserves	13th	2023–24
Scotland	VI Tier	2025–26 West of Scotland Football League (Premier Division)	TBD – competition in progress			
Scotland	VII Tier	2025–26 North of Scotland Football League (Championship)	TBD – competition in progress			
Scotland	VII Tier	2025–26 East of Scotland Football League (First Division)	Armadale Thistle		1st	—N/a
Scotland	VII Tier	2025–26 Midlands Football League (First Division)	Dundee Violet	Blairgowrie	1st	—N/a
Scotland	VII Tier	2025–26 West of Scotland Football League (First Division)	Irvine Meadow	St Roch's	1st	—N/a
Scotland	VIII Tier	2025–26 East of Scotland Football League (Second Division)	TBD – competition in progress			
Scotland	VIII Tier	2025–26 West of Scotland Football League (Second Division)	Bellshill Athletic	Threave Rovers	1st	—N/a
Scotland	IX Tier	2025–26 East of Scotland Football League (Third Division)	Hawick Royal Albert		1st	—N/a
Scotland	IX Tier	2025–26 West of Scotland Football League (Third Division)	TBD – competition in progress			
Scotland	X Tier	2025–26 West of Scotland Football League (Fourth Division)	TBD – competition in progress			
Serbia	II Tier	2025–26 Serbian First League	Zemun	Mačva Šabac	1st	—N/a
Slovakia	II Tier	2025–26 2. Liga	Dukla Banská Bystrica	Zvolen	2nd	2002–03
Slovakia	III Tier	2025–26 3. Liga	West:			
Slovakia	III Tier	2025–26 3. Liga	Middle: Bytča	Námestovo	1st	—N/a
Slovakia	III Tier	2025–26 3. Liga	East: Humenné	Spišská Nová Ves	2nd	2020–21
Slovakia	IV Tier	2025–26 4. Liga	Bratislava:			
Slovakia	IV Tier	2025–26 4. Liga	West:			
Slovakia	IV Tier	2025–26 4. Liga	East:			
Slovakia	IV Tier	2025–26 4. Liga	Middle:			
Slovenia	II Tier	2025–26 Slovenian Second League	Brinje Grosuplje	Nafta 1903	1st	—N/a
Spain	II Tier	2025–26 Segunda División	Racing Santander	Deportivo La Coruña	3rd	1959–60
Spain	III Tier	2025–26 Primera Federación	North Group: Tenerife	Celta Fortuna	1st	—N/a
Spain	III Tier	2025–26 Primera Federación	South Group: Eldense	Sabadell	1st	—N/a
Spain	IV Tier	2025–26 Segunda Federación	Group 1: Deportivo Fabril	Oviedo Vetusta	1st	—N/a
Spain	IV Tier	2025–26 Segunda Federación	Group 2: Real Unión	Alavés B	1st	—N/a
Spain	IV Tier	2025–26 Segunda Federación	Group 3: Sant Andreu	Atlético Baleares	1st	—N/a
Spain	IV Tier	2025–26 Segunda Federación	Group 4: Extremadura	Minera	1st	—N/a
Spain	IV Tier	2025–26 Segunda Federación	Group 5: Rayo Majadahonda	San Sebastián de los Reyes	1st	—N/a
Spain	V Tier	2025–26 Tercera Federación	Group 1 – Galicia: Arosa	Compostela	1st	—N/a
Spain	V Tier	2025–26 Tercera Federación	Group 2 – Asturias: Llanera	Covadonga	2nd	2023–24
Spain	V Tier	2025–26 Tercera Federación	Group 3 – Cantabria: Gimnástica Torrelavega	Laredo	1st	—N/a
Spain	V Tier	2025–26 Tercera Federación	Group 4 – Basque Country: Portugalete	Leioa	1st	—N/a
Spain	V Tier	2025–26 Tercera Federación	Group 5 – Catalonia: Manresa	Badalona	2nd	2021–22
Spain	V Tier	2025–26 Tercera Federación	Group 6 – Valencian Community: Castellonense	Atlético Saguntino	1st	—N/a
Spain	V Tier	2025–26 Tercera Federación	Group 7 – Community of Madrid: Atlético Madrid C	Trival Valderas	1st	—N/a
Spain	V Tier	2025–26 Tercera Federación	Group 8 – Castile and León: Atlético Tordesillas	Guijuelo	1st	—N/a
Spain	V Tier	2025–26 Tercera Federación	Group 9 – Eastern Andalusia and Melilla: Mijas-Las Lagunas	Motril	1st	—N/a
Spain	V Tier	2025–26 Tercera Federación	Group 10 – Western Andalusia and Ceuta: Ciudad de Lucena	Dos Hermanas	1st	—N/a
Spain	V Tier	2025–26 Tercera Federación	Group 11 – Balearic Islands: Mallorca B	Manacor	2nd	2021–22
Spain	V Tier	2025–26 Tercera Federación	Group 12 – Canary Islands: Atlético Paso	San Fernando	2nd	2021–22
Spain	V Tier	2025–26 Tercera Federación	Group 13 – Region of Murcia: Cieza	Murcia Imperial	1st	—N/a
Spain	V Tier	2025–26 Tercera Federación	Group 14 – Extremadura: Don Benito	Badajoz	2nd	2023–24
Spain	V Tier	2025–26 Tercera Federación	Group 15 – Navarre: Peña Sport	Pamplona	1st	—N/a
Spain	V Tier	2025–26 Tercera Federación	Group 16 – La Rioja: UD Logroñés B	Varea	2nd	2023–24
Spain	V Tier	2025–26 Tercera Federación	Group 17 – Aragon: Calamocha	Cuarte	1st	—N/a
Spain	V Tier	2025–26 Tercera Federación	Group 18 – Castilla–La Mancha: Calvo Sotelo	Tarancón	1st	—N/a
Spain	VI Tier	2025–26 Divisiones Regionales de Fútbol	2025–26 División de Honor (Andalusia) – Group 1: Real Betis C	Racing C. Portuense	1st	—N/a
Spain	VI Tier	2025–26 Divisiones Regionales de Fútbol	2025–26 División de Honor (Andalusia) – Group 2: CD Cantoria 2017	Málaga City	1st	—N/a
Spain	VI Tier	2025–26 Divisiones Regionales de Fútbol	2025–26 Regional Preferente (Aragon) – Group 1:			
Spain	VI Tier	2025–26 Divisiones Regionales de Fútbol	2025–26 Regional Preferente (Aragon) – Group 2:			
Spain	VI Tier	2025–26 Divisiones Regionales de Fútbol	2025–26 Primera Asturfútbol:			
Spain	VI Tier	2025–26 Divisiones Regionales de Fútbol	2025–26 Regional Preferente de Ibiza-Formentera: PE Sant Jordi	Sant Rafel	5th	2023–24
Spain	VI Tier	2025–26 Divisiones Regionales de Fútbol	2025–26 Regional Preferente de Mallorca:			
Spain	VI Tier	2025–26 Divisiones Regionales de Fútbol	2025–26 Regional Preferente de Menorca: Migjorn	CE Ferreries	1st	—N/a
Spain	VI Tier	2025–26 Divisiones Regionales de Fútbol	2025–26 Primera Autonómica de Aficionados – Group 1:			
Spain	VI Tier	2025–26 Divisiones Regionales de Fútbol	2025–26 Primera Autonómica de Aficionados – Group 2:			
Spain	VI Tier	2025–26 Divisiones Regionales de Fútbol	2025–26 Lliga Comunitat Valenciana – North: CD Acero		1st	—N/a
Spain	VI Tier	2025–26 Divisiones Regionales de Fútbol	2025–26 Lliga Comunitat Valenciana – South:			
Spain	VI Tier	2025–26 Divisiones Regionales de Fútbol	2025–26 Interinsular Preferente de Las Palmas: Estrella		3rd	2021-22
Spain	VI Tier	2025–26 Divisiones Regionales de Fútbol	2025–26 Interinsular Preferente de Tenerife: Añaza	Laguna	1st	—N/a
Spain	VI Tier	2025–26 Divisiones Regionales de Fútbol	2025–26 Regional Preferente de Cantabria:			
Spain	VI Tier	2025–26 Divisiones Regionales de Fútbol	2025–26 Primera División Regional – Group A: CD Calasanz	CD San José	1st	—N/a
Spain	VI Tier	2025–26 Divisiones Regionales de Fútbol	2025–26 Primera División Preferente – Group 1:			
Spain	VI Tier	2025–26 Divisiones Regionales de Fútbol	2025–26 Primera División Preferente – Group 2:			
Spain	VI Tier	2025–26 Divisiones Regionales de Fútbol	2025–26 Lliga Elit:			
Spain	VI Tier	2025–26 Divisiones Regionales de Fútbol	2025–26 Regional Preferente de Ceuta:			
Spain	VI Tier	2025–26 Divisiones Regionales de Fútbol	2025–26 División de Honor de Álava: Amurrio Club		5th	2020–21
Spain	VI Tier	2025–26 Divisiones Regionales de Fútbol	2025–26 División de Honor de Guipúzcoa:			
Spain	VI Tier	2025–26 Divisiones Regionales de Fútbol	2025–26 División de Honor de Vizcaya:			
Spain	VI Tier	2025–26 Divisiones Regionales de Fútbol	2025–26 Primera División Extremeña – Group 1: UP Plasencia	CP Chinato	2nd	2015–16
Spain	VI Tier	2025–26 Divisiones Regionales de Fútbol	2025–26 Primera División Extremeña – Group 2: CD Guadiana	CP Sanvicenteño	1st	—N/a
Spain	VI Tier	2025–26 Divisiones Regionales de Fútbol	2025–26 Primera División Extremeña – Group 3: CD Quintana	CD Castuera	1st	—N/a
Spain	VI Tier	2025–26 Divisiones Regionales de Fútbol	2025–26 Primera División Extremeña – Group 4: CD Zafra	UC La Estrella	1st	—N/a
Spain	VI Tier	2025–26 Divisiones Regionales de Fútbol	2025–26 Preferente Galicia – Group 1:			
Spain	VI Tier	2025–26 Divisiones Regionales de Fútbol	2025–26 Preferente Galicia – Group 2:			
Spain	VI Tier	2025–26 Divisiones Regionales de Fútbol	2025–26 Regional Preferente de La Rioja			
Spain	VI Tier	2025–26 Divisiones Regionales de Fútbol	2025–26 Primera Autonómica de Melilla			
Spain	VI Tier	2025–26 Divisiones Regionales de Fútbol	2025–26 Preferente Autonómica Murciana			
Spain	VI Tier	2025–26 Divisiones Regionales de Fútbol	2025–26 Primera Autonómica de Navarra			
Sweden	II Tier	2026 Superettan	TBD – competition in progress			
Switzerland	II Tier	2025–26 Swiss Challenge League	Vaduz	Aarau	4th	2013–14
Switzerland	III Tier	2025–26 1. Liga Classic	Group 1:			
Switzerland	III Tier	2025–26 1. Liga Classic	Group 2: Grasshopper Club Zurich U-21		1st	—N/a
Switzerland	III Tier	2025–26 1. Liga Classic	Group 3: YF Juventus		1st	—N/a
Turkey	II Tier	2025–26 TFF 1. Lig	Erzurumspor	Amed	1st	—N/a
Turkey	III Tier	2025–26 TFF 2. Lig	Red Group: Bursaspor	Mardin 1969	1st	—N/a
Turkey	III Tier	2025–26 TFF 2. Lig	White Group: Batman Petrolspor	Muğlaspor	1st	—N/a
Turkey	IV Tier	2025–26 TFF Third League	Group 1: İnegöl Kafkasspor	Çorluspor	1st	—N/a
Turkey	IV Tier	2025–26 TFF Third League	Group 2: 12 Bingölspor	Malatya Yeşilyurtspor	1st	—N/a
Turkey	IV Tier	2025–26 TFF Third League	Group 3: Sebat Gençlikspor	52 Orduspor	1st	—N/a
Turkey	IV Tier	2025–26 TFF Third League	Group 4: Kütahyaspor	Ayvalıkgücü Belediyespor	1st	—N/a
Turkey	V Tier	2025–26 Bölgesel Amatör Lig	Play–off winners:	Runner-up:		
Ukraine	II Tier	2025–26 Ukrainian First League	Bukovyna Chernivtsi	Chornomorets Odesa	1st	—N/a
Ukraine	III Tier	2025–26 Ukrainian Second League	Kulykiv-Bilka	Lokomotyv Kyiv	1st	—N/a
Ukraine	IV Tier	2025–26 Ukrainian Football Amateur League	TBD – competition in progress			
Wales	II Tier	2025–26 Cymru North	Llandudno	Airbus UK Broughton	1st	—N/a
Wales	II Tier	2025–26 Cymru South	Trefelin BGC	Cambrian United	1st	—N/a
Wales	III Tier	2025–26 Ardal NE	Llanuwchllyn		1st	—N/a
Wales	III Tier	2025–26 Ardal NW	Bangor City 1876		1st	—N/a
Wales	III Tier	2025–26 Ardal SE	TBD – competition in progress			
Wales	III Tier	2025–26 Ardal SW	Pure Swansea		1st	—N/a

=== Non UEFA ===
Nation	League	Champion	Second place	Title	Last honour
Gozo	2025–26 Gozo Second Division	Sannat Lions	St. Lawrence Spurs	7th	2019–20

== Women's national Tier II - V leagues ==
=== AFC ===
Nation	League	Champion	Second place	Title	Last honour
Saudi Arabia	2025–26 Saudi Women's First Division League	Al-Taraji	Al-Nahda	1st	—N/a
Singapore	2026 Women's National League	Lion City Sailors 'B'	Frenz GDT Circuit	1st	—N/a

=== OFC ===
Nation	Tier	League	Champion	Second place	Title	Last honour
New Zealand	II Tier	NRFL Women's Premiership	Auckland United	Eastern Suburbs	3rd	2024
New Zealand	II Tier	Women's Central League	Wellington United	Waterside Karori	8th	2025
New Zealand	II Tier	South Island League	Cashmere Technical	Dunedin City Royals	3rd	2024

=== UEFA ===
Nation	Tier	League	Champion	Second place	Title	Last honour
England	II Tier	2025–26 Women's Super League 2	Birmingham City	Crystal Palace	1st	—N/a
England	III Tier	2025–26 FA Women's National League	Northern Premier Division: Burnley	Wolverhampton Wanderers	1st	—N/a
England	III Tier	2025–26 FA Women's National League	Southern Premier Division: Watford	Plymouth Argyle	3rd	2022–23
England	IV tier	2025–26 FA Women's National League	Division One North: Huddersfield Town	Cheadle Town Stingers	1st	—N/a
England	IV tier	2025–26 FA Women's National League	Division One Midlands: Peterborough United	Boldmere St. Michaels	1st	—N/a
England	IV tier	2025–26 FA Women's National League	Division One South East: Fulham	Norwich City	1st	—N/a
England	IV tier	2025–26 FA Women's National League	Division One South West: Swindon Town	Moneyfields	2nd	2015–16
England	V tier	2025–26 North West Women's Regional Football League Premier Division	AFC Fylde	Mancunian Unity	2nd	2003–04 (as Preston North End)
England	V tier	2025–26 North East Regional Women's Football League Premier Division	Bradford City	Thornaby	1st	—N/a
England	V tier	2025–26 West Midlands Regional Women's Football League Premier Division	Lye Town		1st	—N/a
England	V tier	2025–26 East Midlands Regional Women's Football League Premier Division	Chesterfield	Loughborough Foxes Vixens	1st	—N/a
England	V tier	2025–26 Southern Region Women's Football League Premier Division	Wycombe Wanderers	Winchester City Flyers	1st	—N/a
England	V tier	2025–26 South West Regional Women's Football League Premier Division	Torquay United	Forest Green Rovers	1st	—N/a
England	V tier	2025–26 Eastern Region Women's Football League Premier Division	Stevenage	Royston Town	2nd	2015–16
England	V tier	2025–26 London and South East Women's Regional Football League Premier Division	Dartford	Saltdean United	1st	—N/a
France	II Tier	2025–26 Seconde Ligue	Toulouse FC	US Saint-Malo	3rd	2011–12
Germany	II Tier	2025–26 2. Frauen-Bundesliga	VfB Stuttgart	Mainz 05	1st	—N/a
Germany	III tier	2025–26 Frauen-Regionalliga	Regionalliga Nord: Holstein Kiel	SV Henstedt-Ulzburg	4th	2013–14
Germany	III tier	2025–26 Frauen-Regionalliga	Regionalliga Nordost: Hertha BSC	RB Leipzig II	1st	—N/a
Germany	III tier	2025–26 Frauen-Regionalliga	Regionalliga Süd: TSG Hoffenheim II	SV 67 Weinberg	2nd	2013–14
Germany	III tier	2025–26 Frauen-Regionalliga	Regionalliga Südwest: 1. FC Saarbrücken	1. FSV Mainz 05 II	3rd	2021–22
Germany	III tier	2025–26 Frauen-Regionalliga	Regionalliga West: 1. FC Köln II	Borussia Dortmund	4th	2021–22
Italy	II Tier	2025–26 Serie B	Como 1907	Lumezzane	1st	—N/a
Italy	III tier	2025–26 Serie C	Group A: Moncalieri 1953	Real Meda	1st	—N/a
Italy	III tier	2025–26 Serie C	Group B: Orobica	Südtirol		
Italy	III tier	2025–26 Serie C	Group C: Gatteo Mare	Nuova Alba		
Spain	II Tier	2025–26 Primera Federación	Barcelona B	Alavés	3rd	2023–24
Spain	III tier	2025–26 Segunda Federación	Group 1: Athletic Bilbao B	Real Sociedad B		
Spain	III tier	2025–26 Segunda Federación	Group 2: Real Unión de Tenerife	FC Badalona B		
Spain	III tier	2025–26 Segunda Federación	Group 3: Sport Extremadura	Málaga		

== Men's national Tier II - V cups ==
=== AFC ===
Nation	League	Champion	Final score	Second place	Title	Last honour
Singapore	2026 Singapore FA Cup	TBD – competition in progress				

=== CONMEBOL ===
Nation	League	Champion	Final score	Second place	Title	Last honour
Brazil	2026 Copa Alagoas					
Brazil	2026 Copa Espírito Santo					
Brazil	2026 Recopa Catarinense	Avaí	4–2	Figueirense	1st	—N/a

=== UEFA ===
Nation	League	Champion	Final score	Second place	Title	Last honour
Austria						
England	2025–26 EFL Trophy	Luton Town	3–1	Stockport County	2nd	2008–09
England	2025–26 FA Trophy	Southend United	0–0 (4–2 p)	Wealdstone	1st	—N/a
England	2025–26 FA Vase	Stoneham	0–0 (4–2 p)	Cockfosters	1st	—N/a
England	2025–26 Alan Turvey Trophy	Wingate & Finchley	1–0	Ramsgate	2nd	2010–11
England	2025–26 Northern Premier League Cup					
England	2025–26 SCEFL Challenge Cup	Rusthall	4–0	Bearsted	1st	—N/a
England	2025–26 SCEFL Division One Cup					
England	2025–26 Sheffield & Hallamshire Senior Cup					
England	2025–26 National League Cup	Boreham Wood	2–2 (7–6 p)	West Ham United U21	1st	—N/a
Finland		TBD – competition in progress				
Greece						
Iceland	2026 Icelandic Men's Football League Cup B	Haukar	0–0 (4–2 p)	Víkingur Ólafsvík	1st	—N/a
Israel	2025–26 Toto Cup Leumit	Bnei Yehuda Tel Aviv	0–0 (8–7 p)	Kiryat Yam	1st	—N/a
Italy	2025–2026 Coppa Italia Serie C	Potenza	3–2	Latina	1st	—N/a
Italy	2025–2026 Coppa Italia Serie D	FC Pistoiese	3–0	Ancona	1st	—N/a
Malta		TBD – competition in progress				
Moldova	2026 Moldovan Winter Cup	Real Sireți	0–0 (9–8 p)	FC Stăuceni	1st	—N/a
Norway						
Republic of Ireland						
Scotland	2025–26 Scottish Challenge Cup	Raith Rovers	4–1	Inverness CT	4th	2021–22
Scotland	2025–26 Aberdeenshire Shield					
Scotland	2025–26 East of Scotland League Cup					
Scotland	2025–26 Highland League Cup					
Scotland	2025–26 Lowland League Cup					
Scotland	2025–26 North of Scotland Cup	Forres Mechanics	3–2	Clachnacuddin	9th	2010–11
Scotland	2025–26 South Challenge Cup					
Ukraine		TBD – competition in progress				

== Men's university leagues ==
=== AFC ===
Nation	League	Champion	Second place	Title	Last honour
Philippines	2025–26 UAAP Men's Football Championship (Season 88)	UP Fighting Maroons	FEU Tamaraws	20th	2023–24

=== CONCACAF ===
Nation	League	Champion	Second place	Title	Last honour
Canada	2026 U Sports Men's Soccer Championship				
United States	2026 NCAA Division I men's soccer tournament				
United States	2026 NCAA Division II men's soccer tournament				
United States	2026 NCAA Division III men's soccer tournament				
United States	2026 NAIA men's soccer championship				

== Women's university leagues ==
=== AFC ===
Nation	League	Champion	Second place	Title	Last honour
Philippines	2025–26 UAAP Women's Football Championship (Season 88)	FEU Lady Tamaraws	De La Salle Lady Booters	14th	2024–25

=== CAF ===
Nation	League	Champion	Second place	Title	Last honour
South Africa	2026 Women's Varsity Football	Scheduled for September			

=== CONCACAF ===
Nation	League	Champion	Second place	Title	Last honour
Canada	2026 U Sports Women's Soccer Championship				
United States	2026 NCAA Division I women's soccer tournament				
United States	2026 NCAA Division II women's soccer tournament				
United States	2026 NCAA Division III women's soccer tournament				
United States	2026 NAIA women's soccer championship				

== Retirements ==
=== January ===
- 12 January – Mamadou Sakho, 35, French defender.

=== February ===
- 5 February – Marco van Ginkel, 33, Dutch midfielder.

=== March ===
- 5 March – Paul-José M'Poku, 33, Congolese winger and midfielder.
- 22 March – Dimitri Payet, 38, French midfielder.

=== April ===
- 3 April – Victor Wanyama, 34, Kenyan midfielder.
- 4 April – Oscar, 34, Brazilian midfielder.
- 7 April – Aaron Ramsey, 35, Welsh midfielder.
- 30 April – Ashley Young, 40, English winger and full-back.

=== May ===
- 22 May – César Azpilicueta, 36, Spanish defender.
- 27 May – Kasper Schmeichel, 39, Danish goalkeeper.

=== June ===
- 1 June – James Milner, 40, English defender and midfielder.
- 8 June – Divock Origi, 31, Belgian forward.

=== July ===
- 6 July – Guillermo Ochoa, 40, Mexican goalkeeper.
- 16 July – Craig Gordon, 43, Scottish goalkeeper.
- 21 July – Anthony Taylor, 47, English referee.

=== August ===
- 14 August – Ciro Immobile, 36, Italian forward.
- 23 August – Denver Hume, 28, English defender.

=== November ===
- 18 November – Juan Mata, 38, Spanish midfielder.

== Deaths ==
=== January ===
- 1 January
  - Colin McDonald, English footballer
  - Mukhsin Mukhamadiev, Tajik-Russian football player and coach
- 3 January
  - Ahmed Moujahid, Moroccan footballer
  - Dimitar Penev, Bulgarian footballer and manager
  - Terry Wharton, English footballer
- 4 January — Milorad Kosanović, Serbian footballer and manager
- 5 January — José Mingorance, Spanish footballer
- 6 January — Robert Vicot, French footballer and manager
- 7 January
  - Martin Chivers, English footballer
  - Tony Field, English football player
- 8 January
  - Howard Riley, English footballer
  - Terry Yorath, Welsh football player and manager
- 12 January
  - Rolland Courbis, French football player and manager
  - Eddie McCreadie, Scottish football player and manager
  - Benjaminas Zelkevičius, Lithuanian football player and coach
- 13 January — Ali Hassan, Mozambican footballer
- 19 January — Mladen Bartolović, Bosnian and Herzegovinan football player and coach
- 20 January
  - Lucien Muller, French football player and manager
  - Tommy Wright, English footballer
- 27 January — Marcel Loncle, French footballer
- 23 January - Riccardo Chetta, Italian footballer
- 25 January — Dede Sulaeman, Indonesian footballer
- 27 January
  - Boris Ignatyev, Russian football player and manager
  - Tato, Brazilian footballer
  - Rado Vidošić, Croatian-Australian football manager
- 30 January — David Triesman, The Football Association chairman
- Giancarlo Cella, Italian football player and manager
- Hernán Rodríguez, Chilean footballer

=== February ===
- 1 February — Nicola Salerno, Italian sporting director
- 2 February
  - Ranjit Das, Bangladeshi football player and coach
  - Nicolas Giani, Italian footballer
- 7 February — Manolín Bueno, Spanish footballer
- 8 February — Eddy Antoine, Haitian footballer
- 10 February
  - José Luis Russo, Uruguayan footballer
  - Nambatingue Toko, Chadian footballer
- 11 February — Peter Meyer, German footballer
- 18 February
  - Sepp Piontek, German football player and manager
  - Reinhold Wosab, German footballer
- 24 February — Moustafa Reyadh, Egyptian footballer
- 25 February — Horst Schnoor, German footballer
- 26 February — Lynda Hale, English footballer

=== March ===
- 1 March
  - Rino Marchesi, Italian football player and manager
  - Georgi Velinov, Bulgarian footballer
- Vasilios Daniil, Greek football manager
- 5 March — H. H. Hamid, Indian footballer
- 8 March — Arturo López, Bolivian footballer
- 9 March — Festus Onigbinde, Nigerian football manager
- 10 March — Orhan Kaynak, Turkish football player and manager
- Billy McCullough, Northern Irish footballer
- Billy Campbell, Northern Irish player and manager
- 13 March — Gordon Wallace, Scottish footballer and manager
- 14 March — Henry Nwosu, Nigerian football player and manager
- 15 March — Abdulrahman Al-Bishi, Saudi Arabian footballer
- 19 March — Silvino Louro, Portuguese footballer
- 20 March — Marcos Conigliaro, Argentine football player and manager
- 26 March — Giuseppe Savoldi, Italian football player and manager
- 27 March — Alex Cropley, Scottish-English footballer
- 30 March — Tony Godden, English football player and manager
- 31 March — Borislav Mihaylov, Bulgarian footballer
- Kees Kuijs, Dutch footballer

=== April ===
- 1 April — Hans-Jürgen Kreische, East German football player and manager
- 5 April — Adán Godoy, Chilean footballer
- 7 April — Mircea Lucescu, Romanian football player and manager
- 8 April — Srećko Bogdan, Croatian football player and manager
- 11 April — Stefanos Borbokis, Greek football player and manager
- 12 April
  - Dominic Frimpong, Ghanaian footballer
  - Alonso López, Colombian footballer
- 13 April — Henry Newton, English footballer
- 14 April — Vicente Lucas, Portuguese football player and manager
- 15 April — José Santamaría, Uruguayan football player and manager
- 16 April
  - Kazuo Imanishi, Japanese football player and manager
  - Alex Manninger, Austrian footballer
- 21 April — Gideon Tish, Israeli football player and manager
- 22 April — Tony Parkes, English football player and manager
- 24 April — Michael Eneramo, Nigerian footballer

=== May ===
- 2 May — Roque Avallay, Argentine footballer
- 3 May — Eladio Zárate, Paraguayan football player and manager
- 5 May — Timo Kautonen, Finnish footballer
- 6 May
  - Evaristo Beccalossi, Italian footballer
  - László Fazekas, Hungarian football player and manager
  - José Navarro, Peruvian footballer
- 11 May — Coquito, Uruguayan footballer
- 13 May
  - Fleury Di Nallo, French footballer
  - Peter Simpson, English footballer
- 14 May — Jorge Urquía, Honduran footballer
- 15 May — Egon Loy, German footballer
- 18 May — Geovani Silva, Brazilian footballer
- 22 May — Alcides Sosa, Paraguayan footballer
- 23 May
  - Parviz Ghelichkhani, Iranian footballer
  - Tom Lund, Norwegian football player and manager
- 25 May
  - Paraskevas Antzas, Greek footballer
  - Victor Udoh, Nigerian footballer
- 29 May
  - Bryan Bergougnoux, French football player and manager
  - Michel Stievenard, French footballer

=== June ===
- 1 June
  - Raúl Guerrón, Ecuadorian footballer
  - Igoris Kirilovas, Lithuanian footballer
- 3 June — Bobby Tambling, English football player and manager
- 4 June
  - Leivinha, Brazilian footballer
  - José Sanfilippo, Argentine football player and manager
- 11 June
  - Brito, Brazilian footballer
  - Kenny Jackett, Welsh football player and manager
  - Leif Nielsen, Danish football player and manager
- 15 June — Jerry de Jong, Dutch footballer
- 17 June — Éric Roy, French football player and manager
- 26 June — Yimvert Berroterán, Venezuelan footballer

=== July ===
- 11 July — Jayden Adams, South African footballer
- 13 July — Rob Dieperink, Dutch referee
- 20 July — Kevin Keegan, English football player and manager
- 31 July – Franco Baresi, Italian football player. (death announced on this date)

=== August ===
- 6 August – Giuseppe Marchioro, Italian football player and manager
- 10 August
  - Juan Muhlethaler, Uruguayan footballer
  - Jean-Paul Rostagni, French footballer
- 11 August – Phan Thanh Hùng, Vietnamese football player and manager
- 13 August
  - Dumitru Marcu, Romanian football player and manager
  - Yukio Shimomura, Japanese football player and manager
- 14 August – Jimmy Rimmer, English football player and manager
- 17 August – Mike Bailey, English football player and manager
- 18 August – Robert Mouynet, French footballer
- 20 August – Terry Dyson, English footballer
- 21 August – José Maria Júnior, Portuguese footballer
- 22 August – Quévin Castro, Portuguese footballer

Bobby Ross, Scottish football player and manager

- 28 August – Nicolae Ungureanu, Romanian football player and manager
- 30 August – Børge Thorup, Danish footballer
- 31 August – Arturas Fomenka, Lithuanian footballer

=== September ===
- 1 September
  - Alan Knight, English football player and manager
  - Eberhard Vogel, German football player and manager
- 2 September
  - Hugh Curran, Scottish footballer
  - Ivan Gudelj, Croatian footballer
- 3 September – Győző Martos, Hungarian footballer
- 4 September – Jorge Ramírez Gallego, Colombian footballer
- 8 September – Harry Burrows, English footballer
- 13 September – Luděk Mikloško, Czech footballer
- 15 September – Kevin Miller, English footballer
- 19 September – Sandro Mazzola, Italian footballer
- 20 September – Milton Viera, Uruguayan footballer
- 21 September – Sergio Carpanesi, Italian football player and manager
- 24 September – Peter Nogly, German football player and manager
- 25 September – André Guy, French footballer
- 28 September – Ali Bendayan, Moroccan footballer
- 29 September – Şükrü Ersoy, Turkish football player and manager

=== November ===
- 2 November – Jesús de Miguel, Spanish footballer
- 17 November
  - Peter Storey, English footballer.
  - Ralph Brand, Scottish footballer.
