= Turks and Caicos Islands national football team results =

National football team results

The Turks and Caicos Islands national football team represents the Turks and Caicos Islands in international association football under the auspices of the Turks and Caicos Islands Football Association. The TCIFA became a full member of the Caribbean Football Union (CFU) and CONCACAF in 1996. The association joined FIFA two years later.

Below is a list of the Turks and Caicos Islands' results in official matches.

== Key ==
Key to matches

- Att.=Match attendance
- (H)=Home ground
- (A)=Away ground
- (N)=Neutral ground

Key to record by opponent

- Pld=Games played
- W=Games won
- D=Games drawn
- L=Games lost
- GF=Goals for
- GA=Goals against

== Results ==
Turks and Caicos Islands' score is shown first in each case.

| No. | Date | Venue | Opponents | Score | Competition | Turks and Caicos Islands scorers | Att. | Ref. |
|---|---|---|---|---|---|---|---|---|
| 1 | 24 February 1999 | Thomas Robinson Stadium, Nassau (A) | Bahamas | 0–3 | 1999 Caribbean Cup qualification | | — | |
| 2 | 26 February 1999 | Thomas Robinson Stadium, Nassau (N) | U.S. Virgin Islands | 2–2 | 1999 Caribbean Cup qualification | Bryan (2) | — | |
| 3 | 18 March 2000 | Warner Park, Basseterre (A) | Saint Kitts and Nevis | 0–8 | 2002 FIFA World Cup qualification | | 853 | |
| 4 | 21 March 2000 | Warner Park, Basseterre (H) | Saint Kitts and Nevis | 0–6 | 2002 FIFA World Cup qualification | | 1,000 | |
| 5 | 27 September 2000 | Truman Bodden Sports Complex, George Town (A) | Cayman Islands | 0–3 | Friendly | | — | |
| 6 | 18 February 2004 | Miami Orange Bowl, Miami (A) | Haiti | 0–5 | 2006 FIFA World Cup qualification | | 3,000 | |
| 7 | 21 February 2004 | Ted Hendricks Stadium, Hialeah (H) | Haiti | 0–2 | 2006 FIFA World Cup qualification | | 3,000 | |
| 8 | 2 September 2006 | Estadio Pedro Marrero, Havana (A) | Cuba | 0–6 | 2007 Caribbean Cup qualification | | — | |
| 9 | 4 September 2006 | Estadio Pedro Marrero, Havana (N) | Cayman Islands | 2–0 | 2007 Caribbean Cup qualification | Glinton, Fleuriot | 100 | |
| 10 | 6 September 2006 | Estadio Pedro Marrero, Havana (N) | Bahamas | 2–3 | 2007 Caribbean Cup qualification | Glinton (2) | 120 | |
| 11 | 6 February 2008 | TCIFA National Academy, Providenciales (H) | Saint Lucia | 2–1 | 2010 FIFA World Cup qualification | Lowery, Glinton | 2,200 | |
| 12 | 26 March 2008 | George Odlum Stadium, Vieux Fort (A) | Saint Lucia | 0–2 | 2010 FIFA World Cup qualification | | 1,200 | |
| 13 | 2 July 2011 | TCIFA National Academy, Providenciales (H) | Bahamas | 0–4 | 2014 FIFA World Cup qualification | | 1,021 | |
| 14 | 9 July 2011 | Roscow A. L. Davies Soccer Field, Nassau (A) | Bahamas | 0–6 | 2014 FIFA World Cup qualification | | 1,600 | |
| 15 | 30 May 2014 | Trinidad Stadium, Oranjestad (N) | Aruba | 0–1 | 2014 Caribbean Cup qualification | | — | |
| 16 | 1 June 2014 | Trinidad Stadium, Oranjestad (N) | French Guiana | 0–6 | 2014 Caribbean Cup qualification | | — | |
| 17 | 3 June 2014 | Trinidad Stadium, Oranjestad (N) | British Virgin Islands | 2–0 | 2014 Caribbean Cup qualification | Fenelus, Derilien | — | |
| 18 | 23 March 2015 | Warner Park, Basseterre (A) | Saint Kitts and Nevis | 2–6 | 2018 FIFA World Cup qualification | Forbes, Leader (o.g.) | 2,000 | |
| 19 | 26 March 2015 | TCIFA National Academy, Providenciales (H) | Saint Kitts and Nevis | 2–6 | 2018 FIFA World Cup qualification | Calixte (2) | 420 | |
| 20 | 22 March 2018 | Félix Sánchez Olympic Stadium, Santo Domingo (A) | Dominican Republic | 0–4 | Friendly | | — | |
| 21 | 8 September 2018 | Estadio Pedro Marrero, Havana (A) | Cuba | 0–11 | 2019–20 CONCACAF Nations League qualifying | | — | |
| 22 | 13 October 2018 | TCIFA National Academy, Providenciales (H) | Guyana | 0–8 | 2019–20 CONCACAF Nations League qualifying | | — | |
| 23 | 18 November 2018 | TCIFA National Academy, Providenciales (H) | Saint Vincent and the Grenadines | 3–2 | 2019–20 CONCACAF Nations League qualifying | Forbes (2), Francois | — | |
| 24 | 16 March 2019 | Thomas Robinson Stadium, Nassau (A) | Bahamas | 1–6 | Friendly | Fenelus | — | |
| 25 | 21 March 2019 | Raymond E. Guishard Technical Centre, The Valley (A) | British Virgin Islands | 2–2 | 2019–20 CONCACAF Nations League qualifying | Forbes, Dorvil | — | |
| 26 | 10 September 2019 | TCIFA National Academy, Providenciales (H) | Guadeloupe | 0–3 | 2019–20 CONCACAF Nations League | | — | |
| 27 | 10 October 2019 | Ergilio Hato Stadium, Willemstad (A) | Sint Maarten | 5–2 | 2019–20 CONCACAF Nations League | Forbes (3), Beljour, Magny | — | |
| 28 | 14 November 2019 | TCIFA National Academy, Providenciales (H) | Sint Maarten | 3–2 | 2019–20 CONCACAF Nations League | Elcius, Singh, Forbes | — | |
| 29 | 17 November 2019 | Stade René Serge Nabajoth, Les Abymes (A) | Guadeloupe | 0–10 | 2019–20 CONCACAF Nations League | | — | |
| 30 | 19 March 2021 | Estadio Olímpico, La Vega (N) | Barbados | 0–2 | Friendly | | — | |
| 31 | 21 March 2021 | Estadio Olímpico, La Vega (N) | Barbados | 0–5 | Friendly | | — | |
| 32 | 27 March 2021 | Estadio Panamericano, San Cristóbal (H) | Nicaragua | 0–7 | 2022 FIFA World Cup qualification | | — | |
| 33 | 30 March 2021 | Estadio Panamericano, San Cristóbal (A) | Belize | 0–5 | 2022 FIFA World Cup qualification | | — | |
| 34 | 5 June 2021 | TCIFA National Academy, Providenciales (H) | Haiti | 0–10 | 2022 FIFA World Cup qualification | | — | |
| 35 | 12 May 2022 | Thomas Robinson Stadium, Nassau (A) | Bahamas | 2–4 | Friendly | Williams, Amilcar | — | |
| 36 | 14 May 2022 | Thomas Robinson Stadium, Nassau (A) | Bahamas | 2–1 | Friendly | Forbes, Paul | — | |
| 37 | 3 June 2022 | TCIFA National Academy, Providenciales (H) | Bonaire | 1–4 | 2022–23 CONCACAF Nations League | Shand | — | |
| 38 | 6 June 2022 | Bethlehem Soccer Stadium, Saint Croix (A) | U.S. Virgin Islands | 2–3 | 2022–23 CONCACAF Nations League | Paul, Farrell (o.g.) | — | |
| 39 | 11 June 2022 | Stadion Rignaal Jean Francisca, Willemstad (N) | Sint Maarten | 2–8 | 2022–23 CONCACAF Nations League | Forbes (2) | — | |
| 40 | 14 June 2022 | TCIFA National Academy, Providenciales (H) | Sint Maarten | 2–0 | 2022–23 CONCACAF Nations League | Paul (2) | — | |
| 41 | 3 March 2023 | Roscow A. L. Davies Soccer Field, Nassau (A) | Bahamas | 2–1 | Friendly | Forbes (2) | — | |
| 42 | 4 March 2023 | Roscow A. L. Davies Soccer Field, Nassau (A) | Bahamas | 0–2 | Friendly | | — | |
| 43 | 23 March 2023 | TCIFA National Academy, Providenciales (H) | U.S. Virgin Islands | 1–0 | 2022–23 CONCACAF Nations League | Beljour | — | |
| 44 | 28 March 2023 | Stadion Antonio Trenidat, Rincon (A) | Bonaire | 2–1 | 2022–23 CONCACAF Nations League | Forbes (2) | — | |
| 45 | 9 September 2023 | A. O. Shirley Recreation Ground, Road Town (A) | British Virgin Islands | 1–3 | 2023–24 CONCACAF Nations League | Forbes | — | |
| 46 | 12 September 2023 | TCIFA National Academy, Providenciales (H) | Dominica | 0–3 | 2023–24 CONCACAF Nations League | | — | |
| 47 | 16 October 2023 | TCIFA National Academy, Providenciales (H) | British Virgin Islands | 2–2 | 2023–24 CONCACAF Nations League | Forbes (2) | — | |
| 48 | 20 November 2023 | A.O. Shirley Recreation Ground, Road Town (A) | Dominica | 0–2 | 2023–24 CONCACAF Nations League | | — | |
| 49 | 22 March 2024 | Raymond E. Guishard Technical Centre, The Valley (A) | Anguilla | 0–0 | 2026 FIFA World Cup qualification | | — | |
| 50 | 26 March 2024 | TCIFA National Academy, Providenciales (H) | Anguilla | 1–1 | 2026 FIFA World Cup qualification | Forbes | — | |
| 51 | 4 September 2024 | TCIFA National Academy, Providenciales (H) | Anguilla | 0–2 | 2024–25 CONCACAF Nations League | | — | |
| 52 | 7 September 2024 | TCIFA National Academy, Providenciales (H) | Belize | 0–4 | 2024–25 CONCACAF Nations League | | — | |
| 53 | 12 October 2024 | FFB Stadium, Belmopan (N) | Anguilla | 2–1 | 2024–25 CONCACAF Nations League | Jerome, Martin | — | |
| 54 | 15 October 2024 | FFB Stadium, Belmopan (A) | Belize | 0–3 | 2024–25 CONCACAF Nations League | | — | |
| 55 | 13 August 2025 | Jarrell Williams Bulldog Stadium, Springdale (N) | U.S. Virgin Islands | 1–1 (4–5 Pens.) | 2025 Outrigger Challenge Cup | Paul | — | |
| 56 | 16 August 2025 | Jarrell Williams Bulldog Stadium, Springdale (N) | Marshall Islands | 3–2 | 2025 Outrigger Challenge Cup | Clervil (2), Paul | — | |

Notes

1. A: Due to the lack of a regulation pitch, the Turks and Caicos Islands played their home match during qualifying for the 2002 FIFA World Cup in Basseterre, Saint Kitts and Nevis.
2. B: Haiti played their home match against the Turks and Caicos Islands during qualifying for the 2006 FIFA World Cup in Miami, Florida, United States.
3. C: The Turks and Caicos Islands played their home match during qualifying for the 2006 FIFA World Cup in Hialeah, Florida, United States.
4. D: The British Virgin Islands played their home matches during qualifying for the 2019–20 CONCACAF Nations League in The Valley, Anguilla.
5. E: Sint Maarten played their home matches during the 2019–20 CONCACAF Nations League in Willemstad, Curaçao.
6. F: Due to travel and quarantine restrictions caused by the COVID-19 pandemic in North America, the Turks and Caicos Islands played their home match against Nicaragua during qualifying for the 2022 FIFA World Cup in San Cristóbal, Dominican Republic.
7. G: Due to travel and quarantine restrictions caused by the COVID-19 pandemic in North America, Belize played their home match against the Turks and Caicos Islands during qualifying for the 2022 FIFA World Cup in San Cristóbal, Dominican Republic.

== Record by opponent ==
As of match played 4 October 2026

| Team | Pld | W | D | L | GF | GA | GD | WPCT |
|---|---|---|---|---|---|---|---|---|
| Anguilla | 4 | 1 | 2 | 1 | 3 | 4 | −1 | 25.00 |
| Aruba | 1 | 0 | 0 | 1 | 0 | 1 | −1 | 0.00 |
| Bahamas | 9 | 2 | 0 | 7 | 9 | 30 | −21 | 22.22 |
| Barbados | 2 | 0 | 0 | 2 | 0 | 7 | −7 | 0.00 |
| Belize | 3 | 0 | 0 | 3 | 0 | 12 | −12 | 0.00 |
| Bonaire | 2 | 1 | 0 | 1 | 3 | 5 | −2 | 50.00 |
| British Virgin Islands | 6 | 3 | 2 | 1 | 13 | 7 | +6 | 50.00 |
| Cayman Islands | 2 | 1 | 0 | 1 | 2 | 3 | −1 | 50.00 |
| Cuba | 2 | 0 | 0 | 2 | 0 | 17 | −17 | 0.00 |
| Dominica | 2 | 0 | 0 | 2 | 0 | 5 | −5 | 0.00 |
| Dominican Republic | 1 | 0 | 0 | 1 | 0 | 4 | −4 | 0.00 |
| French Guiana | 1 | 0 | 0 | 1 | 0 | 6 | −6 | 0.00 |
| Guadeloupe | 2 | 0 | 0 | 2 | 0 | 13 | −13 | 0.00 |
| Guyana | 1 | 0 | 0 | 1 | 0 | 8 | −8 | 0.00 |
| Haiti | 3 | 0 | 0 | 3 | 0 | 17 | −17 | 0.00 |
| Marshall Islands | 1 | 1 | 0 | 0 | 3 | 2 | +1 | 100.00 |
| Montserrat | 1 | 0 | 0 | 1 | 0 | 2 | −2 | 0.00 |
| Nicaragua | 1 | 0 | 0 | 1 | 0 | 7 | −7 | 0.00 |
| Saint Kitts and Nevis | 4 | 0 | 0 | 4 | 4 | 26 | −22 | 0.00 |
| Saint Lucia | 2 | 1 | 0 | 1 | 2 | 3 | −1 | 50.00 |
| Saint Vincent and the Grenadines | 1 | 1 | 0 | 0 | 3 | 2 | +1 | 100.00 |
| Sint Maarten | 4 | 3 | 0 | 1 | 12 | 12 | 0 | 75.00 |
| U.S. Virgin Islands | 4 | 1 | 1 | 2 | 6 | 6 | 0 | 25.00 |
| Total | 59 | 15 | 5 | 39 | 60 | 199 | −139 | 25.42 |

Source: Results

== All-time goalscorers ==
As of match played 16 August 2025

| Rank | Name | Goals |
|---|---|---|
| 1 | Billy Forbes | 18 |
| 2 | Junior Paul | 6 |
| 3 | Gavin Glinton | 4 |
| 4 | Marc Fenelus | 2 |
| 4 | Widlin Calixte | 2 |
| 4 | Jeff Beljour | 2 |
| 4 | Keniel Clervil | 2 |
| 4 | Christopher Bryan | 2 |
| 9 | Maxime Fleuriot | 1 |
| 9 | David Lowery | 1 |
| 9 | Stevens Derilien | 1 |
| 9 | Jepthe Francois | 1 |
| 9 | Fred Dorvil | 1 |
| 9 | Herby Magny | 1 |
| 9 | Jose Elcius | 1 |
| 9 | Lenford Singh | 1 |
| 9 | Cory Williams | 1 |
| 9 | Markenly Amilcar | 1 |
| 9 | Karl Shand | 1 |
| 9 | Ledson Jerome | 1 |
| 9 | Emmanuel Martin | 1 |

- Source: Results
