= List of Turks and Caicos Islands international footballers =

The Turks and Caicos Islands national football team represents the British Overseas Territory of the Turks and Caicos Islands in international association football. It is fielded by the Turks and Caicos Islands Football Association, the governing body of football in the Turks and Caicos Islands, and competes as a member of CONCACAF, which encompasses the countries of North America, including Central America and the Caribbean region. The Turks and Caicos Islands played their first international match on 24 February 1999 in a 3–0 loss to the Bahamas in Nassau.

The Turks and Caicos Islands have competed in numerous competitions, and all players who have played in at least one international match, either as a member of the starting eleven or as a substitute, are listed below. Each player's details include his playing position while with the team, the number of caps earned and goals scored in all international matches, and details of the first and most recent matches played. The names are initially ordered by number of caps (in descending order), then by date of debut, then by alphabetical order. All statistics are correct up to and including the match played on 28 March 2023.

== Players ==
Turks and Caicos Islands national team football players
Player	Pos.	Caps	Goals	Debut		Last or most recent match		Ref.
Player	Pos.	Caps	Goals	Date	Opponent	Date	Opponent	Ref.
Billy Forbes	FW	20	7	6 February 2008	Saint Lucia	28 March 2023	Bonaire	
Lenford Singh	FW	25	1	2 September 2006	Cuba	14 June 2022	Sint Maarten	
Wildens Delva	DF	21	0	30 May 2014	Aruba	11 June 2022	Sint Maarten	
James Rene	DF	18	0	9 July 2011	Bahamas	4 March 2023	Bahamas	
Widlin Calixte	MF	17	2	23 March 2015	Saint Kitts and Nevis	28 March 2023	Bonaire	
José Elcius	MF	17	1	22 March 2018	Dominican Republic	14 June 2022	Sint Maarten	
Pendieno Brooks	GK	16	0	22 March 2018	Dominican Republic	4 March 2023	Bahamas	
Marco Fenelus	FW	15	2	9 July 2011	Bahamas	17 November 2019	Guadeloupe	
Jeff Beljour	DF	15	2	22 March 2018	Dominican Republic	28 March 2023	Bonaire	
Mackenson Cadet	MF	15	0	22 March 2018	Dominican Republic	28 March 2023	Bonaire	
Alex Bryan	DF	14	0	23 March 2015	Saint Kitts and Nevis	30 March 2021	Belize	
Ledson Jerome	DF	14	0	8 September 2018	Cuba	28 March 2023	Bonaire	
Fred Dorvil	FW	12	1	30 May 2014	Aruba	14 May 2022	Bahamas	
Phillip Shearer	FW	11	0	18 March 2000	Saint Kitts and Nevis	3 June 2014	British Virgin Islands	
Christopher Louisy	MF	11	0	10 October 2019	Sint Maarten	28 March 2023	Bonaire	
Raymond Burey	FW	11	0	5 June 2021	Haiti	28 March 2023	Bonaire	
Gavin Glinton	FW	10	4	18 February 2004	Haiti	3 June 2014	British Virgin Islands	
Herby Magny	MF	10	1	23 March 2015	Saint Kitts and Nevis	17 November 2019	Guadeloupe	
Markenly Amilcar	MF	10	1	18 November 2018	Saint Vincent and the Grenadines	14 June 2022	Sint Maarten	
Duane Glinton	DF	9	0	18 February 2004	Haiti	9 July 2011	Bahamas	
Callum Park	MF	9	0	30 March 2021	Belize	28 March 2023	Bonaire	
Cory Williams	DF	9	1	5 June 2021	Haiti	28 March 2023	Bonaire	
Junior Paul	FW	9	4	12 May 2022	Bahamas	28 March 2023	Bonaire	
Marc-Donald Fenelus	DF	8	0	30 May 2014	Aruba	16 March 2019	Bahamas	
Errion Charles	FW	7	0	24 February 1999	Bahamas	21 February 2004	Haiti	
Charles Cook	MF	7	0	18 March 2000	Saint Kitts and Nevis	26 March 2008	Saint Lucia	
Jack McKnight	FW	7	0	2 July 2011	Bahamas	30 March 2021	Belize	
Stevens Derilien	MF	7	1	30 May 2014	Aruba	10 September 2019	Guadeloupe	
Wilkins Sylvain	FW	7	0	16 March 2019	Bahamas	25 March 2023	U.S. Virgin Islands	
Sebastian Turbyfield	GK	7	0	5 June 2021	Haiti	28 March 2023	Bonaire	
Christopher Bryan	DF	6	2	24 February 1999	Bahamas	6 September 2006	Bahamas	
Karl Jr. Shand	FW	6	1	12 May 2022	Bahamas	28 March 2023	Bonaire	
Joseph Agenor	DF	5	0	24 February 1999	Bahamas	6 September 2006	Bahamas	
Lagneau Brumvert	MF	5	0	24 February 1999	Bahamas	2 July 2011	Bahamas	
Steven Thompson	DF	5	0	24 February 1999	Bahamas	21 February 2004	Haiti	
Chris Bruno	MF	5	0	18 February 2004	Haiti	6 February 2008	Saint Lucia	
Raymondson Azemard	GK	5	0	2 July 2011	Bahamas	26 March 2015	Saint Kitts and Nevis	
Hency Gedeon	DF	5	0	12 May 2022	Bahamas	28 March 2023	Bonaire	
Kristen Howell	DF	5	0	14 May 2022	Bahamas	4 March 2023	Bahamas	
Anthony Graham	MF	4	0	24 February 1999	Bahamas	21 March 2000	Saint Kitts and Nevis	
Ian Hurdle	MF	4	0	24 February 1999	Bahamas	21 March 2000	Saint Kitts and Nevis	
Paul Slattery	DF	4	0	18 March 2000	Saint Kitts and Nevis	21 February 2004	Haiti	
Dady Aristide	FW	4	0	27 September 2000	Cayman Islands	13 October 2018	Guyana	
Alenus Augustine	GK	4	0	27 September 2000	Cayman Islands	6 September 2006	Bahamas	
Paul Crosbie	MF	4	0	18 February 2004	Haiti	6 September 2006	Bahamas	
Christ Gannon	DF	4	0	18 February 2004	Haiti	26 March 2008	Saint Lucia	
Ian Jones	GK	4	0	6 February 2008	Saint Lucia	23 March 2015	Saint Kitts and Nevis	
Kelly Louima	MF	4	0	30 May 2014	Aruba	22 March 2018	Dominican Republic	
Ras Diamond	DF	4	0	3 March 2023	Bahamas	28 March 2023	Bonaire	
Mario Paul	MF	3	0	24 February 1999	Bahamas	27 September 2000	Cayman Islands	
James Slattery	MF	3	0	24 February 1999	Bahamas	21 February 2004	Haiti	
Colin Sterling	GK	3	0	24 February 1999	Bahamas	21 March 2000	Saint Kitts and Nevis	
Paul Winder	DF	3	0	24 February 1999	Bahamas	18 March 2000	Saint Kitts and Nevis	
Maxime Fleuriot	FW	3	1	27 September 2000	Cayman Islands	6 September 2006	Bahamas	
Gerard Gregg	GK	3	0	18 February 2004	Haiti	6 September 2006	Bahamas	
Steve Savage	MF	3	0	18 February 2004	Haiti	26 March 2008	Saint Lucia	
John Beckford	FW	3	0	2 September 2006	Cuba	6 September 2006	Bahamas	
Jerome Cohall	MF	3	0	2 September 2006	Cuba	6 September 2006	Bahamas	
Sabuton John	MF	3	0	2 September 2006	Cuba	6 September 2006	Bahamas	
Syed Hassan	MF	3	0	9 July 2011	Bahamas	26 March 2015	Saint Kitts and Nevis	
Paul Collins	DF	3	0	30 May 2014	Aruba	3 June 2014	British Virgin Islands	
Chris Gardiner	DF	3	0	30 May 2014	Aruba	3 June 2014	British Virgin Islands	
Jerry Liluce	FW	3	0	30 May 2014	Aruba	3 June 2014	British Virgin Islands	
Jack Watson	DF	3	0	13 October 2018	Guyana	21 March 2019	British Virgin Islands	
Rascari Cox	MF	3	0	27 March 2021	Nicaragua	5 June 2021	Haiti	
Kenley Ducasse	FW	2	0	24 February 1999	Bahamas	26 February 1999	U.S. Virgin Islands	
Edward Miller	GK	2	0	24 February 1999	Bahamas	26 February 1999	U.S. Virgin Islands	
Ronald Gardiner	MF	2	0	18 March 2000	Saint Kitts and Nevis	21 March 2000	Saint Kitts and Nevis	
Fraser Park	DF	2	0	18 March 2000	Saint Kitts and Nevis	21 March 2000	Saint Kitts and Nevis	
Stephen Sales	DF	2	0	18 March 2000	Saint Kitts and Nevis	21 March 2000	Saint Kitts and Nevis	
Gregory Watts	MF	2	0	18 March 2000	Saint Kitts and Nevis	21 March 2000	Saint Kitts and Nevis	
Lawrence Harvey	MF	2	0	18 February 2004	Haiti	21 February 2004	Haiti	
Widd Beauplan	DF	2	0	2 September 2006	Cuba	4 September 2006	Cayman Islands	
Everton Dennis	MF	2	0	2 September 2006	Cuba	4 September 2006	Cayman Islands	
Dukens Dorisca	MF	2	0	2 September 2006	Cuba	4 September 2006	Cayman Islands	
John Shearer	FW	2	0	2 September 2006	Cuba	6 September 2006	Bahamas	
Lee Coulton	DF	2	0	6 February 2008	Saint Lucia	26 March 2008	Saint Lucia	
David Lowery	FW	2	1	6 February 2008	Saint Lucia	26 March 2008	Saint Lucia	
George Brough	MF	2	0	2 July 2011	Bahamas	9 July 2011	Bahamas	
Woody Gibson	DF	2	0	2 July 2011	Bahamas	9 July 2011	Bahamas	
Peter Glinton	MF	2	0	2 July 2011	Bahamas	9 July 2011	Bahamas	
Kevin Speer	DF	2	0	2 July 2011	Bahamas	9 July 2011	Bahamas	
Gilbert Tilus	DF	2	0	22 March 2018	Dominican Republic	8 September 2018	Cuba	
James Lee Louis	DF	2	0	8 September 2018	Cuba	18 November 2018	Saint Vincent and the Grenadines	
Jefftho Joachin	MF	2	0	16 March 2019	Bahamas	21 March 2019	British Virgin Islands	
Watson Jean-Louis	MF	2	0	10 October 2019	Sint Maarten	17 November 2019	Guadeloupe	
Dornell Wiles	FW	2	0	12 May 2022	Bahamas	14 May 2022	Bahamas	
Emmanuel Martin	MF	2	0	3 March 2023	Bahamas	4 March 2023	Bahamas	
Patrick Baptiste	MF	1	0	26 February 1999	U.S. Virgin Islands	26 February 1999	U.S. Virgin Islands	
Kirton Sutton	GK	1	0	18 March 2000	Saint Kitts and Nevis	18 March 2000	Saint Kitts and Nevis	
Edrice Aristilde	MF	1	0	27 September 2000	Cayman Islands	27 September 2000	Cayman Islands	
César Octavio Borges	FW	1	0	27 September 2000	Cayman Islands	27 September 2000	Cayman Islands	
Sadraq Mondestin	MF	1	0	27 September 2000	Cayman Islands	27 September 2000	Cayman Islands	
Ricol Pauleus	DF	1	0	27 September 2000	Cayman Islands	27 September 2000	Cayman Islands	
Terence Rose	DF	1	0	27 September 2000	Cayman Islands	27 September 2000	Cayman Islands	
Wesley Wickham	FW	1	0	27 September 2000	Cayman Islands	27 September 2000	Cayman Islands	
Lavard Evans	DF	1	0	21 March 2000	Saint Kitts and Nevis	21 March 2000	Saint Kitts and Nevis	
Christian Reid	MF	1	0	18 February 2004	Haiti	18 February 2004	Haiti	
Ryan Duffy	MF	1	0	21 February 2004	Haiti	21 February 2004	Haiti	
Jerry Stokes	FW	1	0	21 February 2004	Haiti	21 February 2004	Haiti	
Ajah Johnson	MF	1	0	6 February 2008	Saint Lucia	6 February 2008	Saint Lucia	
Ian Brown	DF	1	0	26 March 2008	Saint Lucia	26 March 2008	Saint Lucia	
Andrew Byrne	MF	1	0	26 March 2008	Saint Lucia	26 March 2008	Saint Lucia	
Spentz Francois	MF	1	0	2 July 2011	Bahamas	2 July 2011	Bahamas	
Events Jean	MF	1	0	2 July 2011	Bahamas	2 July 2011	Bahamas	
Luis Turbyfield	FW	1	0	1 June 2014	French Guiana	1 June 2014	French Guiana	
Evens Alcide	DF	1	0	23 March 2015	Saint Kitts and Nevis	23 March 2015	Saint Kitts and Nevis	
Shinaider Charles	DF	1	0	22 March 2018	Dominican Republic	22 March 2018	Dominican Republic	
Kaeson Garland	FW	1	0	14 May 2022	Bahamas	14 May 2022	Bahamas	
Ronaldo Registre	MF	1	0	14 May 2022	Bahamas	14 May 2022	Bahamas	
Peterson St. Fleurant	GK	1	0	14 May 2022	Bahamas	14 May 2022	Bahamas	
Rosmith Messieur	FW	1	0	25 March 2023	U.S. Virgin Islands	25 March 2023	U.S. Virgin Islands	
