= 2026 CFU Club Shield =

Football tournament

Tournament details
- Host country: Trinidad and Tobago
- Dates: 23 July – 2 August
- Teams: 22 (from 22 associations)

Final positions
- Champions: (Jamaica) Mount Pleasant (1st title)
- Runners-up: (Dominican Republic) Delfines del Este

Tournament statistics
- Matches played: 19
- Goals scored: 59 (3.11 per match)
- Top scorer: (Jamaica) Kemar Beckford (4 goals)

The 2026 CFU Club Shield was the ninth edition of the CFU Club Shield, the second-tier annual international club football competition in the Caribbean region, held amongst the clubs affiliated with the Caribbean Football Union (CFU), a sub-confederation of CONCACAF. The tournament was played in Trinidad and Tobago between 23 July and 2 August 2026. Moca of the Dominican Republic were the defending champions.

Both the winners and the runners-up qualified to participate in the 2026 CONCACAF Caribbean Cup.

== Teams ==
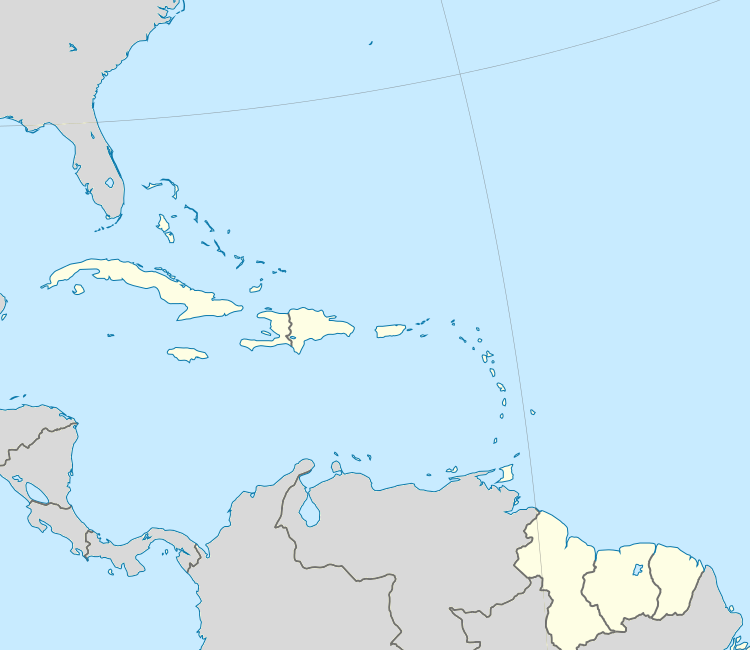
Location of teams of the 2026 CFU Club Shield
(H): Hosts

Association	Team	Qualification method	App. (last)	Previous best (last)
Anguilla	Roaring Lions	2025 AFA Senior Male League champions	1st	Debut
Antigua and Barbuda	All Saints United	2024–25 Antigua and Barbuda Premier Division champions	2nd (2025)	Group stage (2025)
Aruba	Britannia	2024–25 Aruban Division di Honor champions	2nd (2025)	Group stage (2025)
Barbados	Weymouth Wales	2025 Barbados Premier League champions	4th (2025)	Runners-up (2025)
British Virgin Islands	Virgin Gorda United	2024–25 BVIFA National Football League champions	1st	Debut
Cayman Islands	Elite	2024–25 Cayman Islands Premier League champions	1st	Debut
Curaçao	Inter Willemstad	2025–26 Curaçao Promé Divishon champions	1st	Debut
Dominica	Dublanc	2025 Dominica Premier League champions	3rd (2025)	Fourth place (2024)
Dominican Republic	Delfines del Este	2025–26 Liga Dominicana de Fútbol Liguilla non-finalists with the higher aggregate table points (Note: Atlético Pantoja had originally qualified for the 2026 Club Shield by topping the standings in the regular season. However, the club announced that it would suspend its license for a year, causing the club to be replaced by Delfines del Este.)	1st	Debut
Grenada	St. John's Sports	2025–26 GFA Premier League champions	1st	Debut
Guyana	Slingerz	2025 GFF Elite League champions	1st	Debut
Haiti	Baltimore	2026 D1 Special Championship runners-up	1st	Debut
Jamaica	Mount Pleasant	2025–26 Jamaica Premier League third place	1st	Debut
Saint Lucia	La Clery	2025 Saint Lucia SemiPro Football League champions	2nd (2025)	Group stage (2025)
Puerto Rico	Metropolitan	2025 Liga Puerto Rico Clausura champions	5th (2024)	Fourth place (2023)
Saint Kitts and Nevis	St. Paul's United	2025 SKNFA Premier League champions	4th (2025)	Group stage (2025)
Sint Maarten	SCSA Eagles	2024–25 Sint Maarten Premier League champions	3rd (2025)	Preliminary round (2024)
Saint Vincent and the Grenadines	North Leeward Predators	2024–25 SVGFF Premier Division champions	1st	Debut
Suriname	Robinhood	2025-26 Suriname Major League runners-up	4th (2024)	Champions (2023)
Trinidad and Tobago (H)	Prison Service	2025–26 TT Premier Football League third place	1st	Debut
Turks and Caicos Islands	SWA Sharks	2024–25 Provo Premier League champions	4th (2024)	Round of 16 (2024)
U.S. Virgin Islands	Helenites	2025 USVISF Premier League champions	1st	Debut

== Schedule ==
The schedule of the competition was as follows.

Round	Dates
First round	23–24 July
Round of 16	25–26 July
Quarter-finals	28 July
Semi-finals	31 July
Final	2 August

== Bracket ==
First round
(Turks and Caicos Islands) SWA Sharks	0
(Guyana) Slingerz	4
(Saint Lucia) La Clery	2
(Anguilla) Roaring Lions	1
(Saint Kitts and Nevis) St. Paul's United	0
(United States Virgin Islands) Helenites	3
(Saint Vincent and the Grenadines) North Leeward Predators	3
(Sint Maarten) SCSA Eagles	1
(Dominica) Dublanc	1
(Grenada) St. John's Sports	3
(Cayman Islands) Elite	2
(British Virgin Islands) Virgin Gorda United	0

Round of 16
(Jamaica) Mount Pleasant	w/o
(Antigua and Barbuda) ~~All Saints United~~
(Aruba) Britannia	1 (3)
(Barbados) Weymouth Wales (p)	1 (4)
(Trinidad and Tobago) Prison Service	3
(Guyana) Slingerz	4
(Suriname) Robinhood	2
(Saint Lucia) La Clery	0
(Haiti) ~~Baltimore~~
(United States Virgin Islands) Helenites	w/o
(Puerto Rico) Metropolitan	4
(Saint Vincent and the Grenadines) North Leeward Predators	0
(Curaçao) Inter Willemstad	5
(Grenada) St. John's Sports	2
(Dominican Republic) Delfines del Este	2
(Cayman Islands) Elite	0

Quarter-finals
(Jamaica) Mount Pleasant	1
(Barbados) Weymouth Wales	0
(Guyana) Slingerz	0
(Suriname) Robinhood	4
(United States Virgin Islands) Helenites	1
(Puerto Rico) Metropolitan	2
(Curaçao) Inter Willemstad	1 (5)
(Dominican Republic) Delfines del Este (p)	1 (6)

Semi-finals
(Jamaica) Mount Pleasant	3
(Suriname) Robinhood	1
(Puerto Rico) Metropolitan	0 (9)
(Dominican Republic) Delfines del Este (p)	0 (10)

Final
(Jamaica) Mount Pleasant	1
(Dominican Republic) Delfines del Este	0

== First round ==
23 July 2026
10:00 UTC−4

Dublanc (Dominica)	1–3	(Grenada) St. John's Sports
Laville 45+8'	Report	A. Williams 41'; S. Williams 45+2' (pen.); Sampson 54'

Ato Boldon Stadium, Couva
Referee: Evens Julmis (Bahamas)
23 July 2026
13:30 UTC−4

SWA Sharks (Turks and Caicos Islands)	0–4	(Guyana) Slingerz
	Report	Beckford 10', 44'; Barrow 75'; García 84'

Ato Boldon Stadium, Couva
Referee: Renlee Napoleón (Saint Lucia)
23 July 2026
16:00 UTC−4

La Clery (Saint Lucia)	2–1	(Anguilla) Roaring Lions
Degazon 16' (pen.), 25'	Report	Williams 90'

Ato Boldon Stadium, Couva
Referee: Vimarest Díaz (Dominican Republic)
24 July 2026
10:00 UTC−4

North Leeward Predators (Saint Vincent and the Grenadines)	3–1	(Sint Maarten) SCSA Eagles
Mingot 22'; Franklyn 56'; Spring 58'	Report	Tavernier 51' (pen.)

Ato Boldon Stadium, Couva
Referee: Mendy Pierre (Martinique)
24 July 2026
13:30 UTC−4

St. Paul's United (Saint Kitts and Nevis)	0–3	(United States Virgin Islands) Helenites
	Report	Pierre 45+1'; McKree 53'; Harper 57'

Ato Boldon Stadium, Couva
Referee: Vernent Joseph (Dominica)
24 July 2026
16:00 UTC−4

Elite (Cayman Islands)	2–0	(British Virgin Islands) Virgin Gorda United
Morton 17' (o.g.); Tibbetts 56'	Report

Ato Boldon Stadium, Couva
Referee: Alexi Perry (Jamaica)

== Round of 16 ==
25 July 2026
15:30 UTC−4

Prison Service (Trinidad and Tobago)	3–4	(Guyana) Slingerz
Paul 32'; Kesar 32'; Williams 90+4' (pen.)	Report	Beckford 17', 59'; Barrow 67'; García 90+3'

Hasely Crawford Stadium, Port of Spain
Referee: Sanchez Bass (Saint Kitts and Nevis)
25 July 2026

Mount Pleasant (Jamaica)	1–0 (walkover)	(Antigua and Barbuda) All Saints United

25 July 2026
16:00 UTC−4

Britannia (Aruba)	1–1	(Barbados) Weymouth Wales
Castillo 45+2'	Report	Lashley 6'
Penalties
Croes (penalty scored); Castillo (penalty scored); Ramirez (penalty scored); Jansen (penalty missed); Melchor (penalty missed)	3–4	(penalty missed) Harewood; (penalty scored) Hill; (penalty scored) Neblett; (penalty scored) Williams; (penalty scored) Bynoe

Larry Gomes Stadium, Malabar
Referee: Adrian Lage Perez (Cuba)
25 July 2026
18:00 UTC−4

Robinhood (Suriname)	2–0	(Saint Lucia) La Clery
Rigters 11' (pen.); Cronie 18'	Report

Hasely Crawford Stadium, Port of Spain
Referee: Moeth Gaymes (Saint Vincent and the Grenadines)
26 July 2026

Baltimore (Haiti)	0–1 (walkover)	(United States Virgin Islands) Helenites

26 July 2026
15:30 UTC−4

Inter Willemstad (Curaçao)	5–2	(Grenada) St. John's Sports
Leuteria 15', 33'; Dav. Rosa 20'; Martina 38'; Lopez 69'	Report	S. Joseph 28'; D. Joseph 90+2'

Hasely Crawford Stadium, Port of Spain
Referee: Ray Torres (Puerto Rico)
26 July 2026
16:00 UTC−4

Metropolitan (Puerto Rico)	4–0	(Saint Vincent and the Grenadines) North Leeward Predators
Terrón 2', 16', 45+3'; Rivera 86'	Report

Larry Gomes Stadium, Malabar
Referee: Christopher Mason (Jamaica)
26 July 2026
18:00 UTC−4

Delfines del Este (Dominican Republic)	2–0	(Cayman Islands) Elite
Matta 13'; Losada 27'	Report

Hasely Crawford Stadium, Port of Spain
Referee: Shekiel Jokil (Suriname)

== Quarter-finals ==
28 July 2026
13:30 UTC−4

Mount Pleasant (Jamaica)	1–0	(Barbados) Weymouth Wales
Marreno 66'	Report

Larry Gomes Stadium, Malabar
Referee: Amaury Majors (Bermuda)
28 July 2026
13:30 UTC−4

Helenites (United States Virgin Islands)	1–2	(Puerto Rico) Metropolitan
St. Louis 13'	Report	Ramos 50'; Bordagaray 59'

Ato Boldon Stadium, Couva
Referee: Renlee Napoleón (Saint Lucia)
28 July 2026
16:00 UTC−4

Slingerz (Guyana)	0–4	(Suriname) Robinhood
	Report	Adipi 37'; Ziljer 59', 75'; Dimitrio 66'

Larry Gomes Stadium, Malabar
Referee: José Corporán (Dominican Republic)
28 July 2026
16:00 UTC−4

Inter Willemstad (Curaçao)	1–1	(Dominican Republic) Delfines del Este
Leuteria 53'	Report	Gómez 36'
Penalties
Marina (penalty scored); Dav. Rosa (penalty missed); Lourens (penalty scored); Colina (penalty scored); Leuteria (penalty scored); Stokkel (penalty scored); Dan. Rosa (penalty missed)	5–6	(penalty scored) Gonzalez; (penalty scored) Matta; (penalty scored) Valerio; (penalty missed) Rodriguez; (penalty scored) Guzman; (penalty scored) De Leon; (penalty scored) Batista

Ato Boldon Stadium, Couva
Referee: Moeth Gaymes (Saint Vincent and the Grenadines)

== Semi-finals ==
31 July 2026
13:30 UTC−4

Mount Pleasant (Jamaica)	3–1	(Suriname) Robinhood
Reid 32' (pen.); Anglin 57'; Phillips 82'	Report	Carlos da Silva 90'

Ato Boldon Stadium, Couva
Referee: Vimarest Díaz (Dominican Republic)
31 July 2026
16:00 UTC−4

Metropolitan (Puerto Rico)	0–0	(Dominican Republic) Delfines del Este
	Report
Penalties
Ramos (penalty scored); Ocampo (penalty scored); M. Martinez (penalty missed); Mendez (penalty scored); Rivera (penalty scored); Maroni (penalty scored); Terrón (penalty scored); Valkenburg (penalty scored); F. Martinez (penalty scored); Dominguez (penalty scored); Ayala (penalty missed)	9–10	(penalty scored) Gonzalez; (penalty missed) Matta; (penalty scored) Valerio; (penalty scored) Hinestroza; (penalty scored) Guzman; (penalty scored) Losada; (penalty scored) De Leon; (penalty scored) Batista; (penalty scored) C. Almonte; (penalty scored) Balanta; (penalty scored) P. Almonte

Ato Boldon Stadium, Couva
Referee: Shekiel Jokil (Suriname)

== Final ==
2 August 2026
16:00 UTC−4

Mount Pleasant (Jamaica)	1–0	(Dominican Republic) Delfines del Este
Bradford 52'	Report

Ato Boldon Stadium, Couva
Referee: Amaury Majors (Bermuda)

== See also ==
- 2026 Leagues Cup
- 2026 CONCACAF Central American Cup
- 2026 CONCACAF Caribbean Cup
- 2027 CONCACAF Champions Cup
