= Karl Shand =

Turks and Caicos Islander footballer (born 2002)

Personal information
- Full name: Karl "KJ" Shand, Jr.
- Date of birth: 16 August 2001 (age 25)
- Height: 1.85 m (6 ft 1 in)
- Position: Striker

Team information
- Current team: Midway Eagles
- Number: 21

College career
Years	Team	Apps	(Gls)
2020–2022	Kentucky Wesleyan Panthers	8	(1)
2023–2025	Midway Eagles	25	(2)

International career^{‡}
2022–	Turks and Caicos Islands	10	(1)
- ‡ National team caps and goals as of 00:05, 30 June 2025 (UTC)

Karl Shand (born 16 August 2001) is a Turks and Caicos Islander association footballer who currently plays college soccer for the Midway Eagles, and the Turks and Caicos Islands national team.

== Club career ==
Shand was born and raised on Providenciales to a footballing family which includes his uncles Gavin Glinton and Duane Glinton. He attended the British West Indies Collegiate School before moving to the United States in 2017 to prepare to play college soccer. He then attended Somerset High School in Somerset, Kentucky and played for the school team there. In 2018, he was a key part of the offense as Somerset High School won Kentucky's 47th District title. In March 2020, Shand was named the Athlete of the Week by finishing his senior season with five goals and eight assists. That season he was also recognized as a member of the 2020 Commonwealth Journal's All-County High School Boys Soccer Team.

In early 2020, it was announced that Shand had received a scholarship to play college soccer for the Panthers of Kentucky Wesleyan College in the NCAA Division II. He went on to make three appearances for the team during the 2021 season. The following season, Shand transferred to Midway College to play for its Eagles soccer team in the NAIA. In total he made twenty-five appearances for the Eagles, scoring two goals, before graduating at the end of the 2024/2025 season.

== International career ==
Shand made his senior international debut on 12 May 2022 in a friendly against the Bahamas. He scored his first senior goal for his nation on 3 June 2022 in a 2022–23 CONCACAF Nations League C defeat to Bonaire.

Scores and results list the Turks and Caicos Islands' goal tally first.

No.	Date	Venue	Opponent	Score	Result	Competition
1	3 June 2022	TCIFA National Academy, Providenciales, Turks and Caicos Islands	Bonaire	1–4	1–4	2022–23 CONCACAF Nations League C
Last updated 7 July 2025

=== International career statistics ===
As of match played 26 March 2024.

Turks and Caicos national team
2022	5	1
2023	3	0
2024	2	0
Total	10	1
