= SPFL (disambiguation) =

SPFL most frequently refers to the Scottish Professional Football League.

SPFL may also refer to:

- Saint Lucia SemiPro Football League
- Saint Petersburg, Florida, city in the United States
- Socialist Party of Florida, American political party
