= Emmanuel Martin (footballer) =

Turks and Caicos Islander footballer (born 2007)

Personal information
- Date of birth: 26 May 2007 (age 19)
- Place of birth: Blue Hills, Turks and Caicos Islands
- Height: 1.70 m (5 ft 7 in)
- Position: Midfielder

Team information
- Current team: Pickering Town
- Number: 11

Senior career*
Years	Team	Apps	(Gls)
2023–2025	Academy Eagles		
2025–2026	Bridlington Town		
2026–	Pickering Town	5	(0)

International career^{‡}
2023–	Turks and Caicos Islands	14	(1)
- * Club domestic league appearances and goals ‡ National team caps and goals as of 19:14, 6 August 2026 (UTC)

Emmanuel Martin (born 26 May 2007) is a Turks and Caicos Islander association footballer who currently plays for Pickering Town and the Turks and Caicos Islands national team.

== Club career ==
As a youth, Martin played for his school team at HJ Robinson High School. He also played domestically for Academy Eagles FC in the Provo Premier League. In 2025, he moved to England on a scholarship with Bridlington Town. The following summer, he joined the first team of Pickering Town of the Northern Counties East Football League Premier Division. Martin scored Pickering Town's only goal in a 1–2 defeat to Whitby Town in the team's first pre-season friendly.

== International career ==
At the youth level, Martin represented the Turks and Caicos Islands in 2024 and 2026 CONCACAF U-20 Championship qualifying. In the former, he scored against Guyana in a 1–2 Group Stage defeat. Martin made his senior international debut on 3 March 2023 in a friendly against the Bahamas. In 2024, senior national team head coach Aaron Lawrence said about Martin, "We have a few young players coming in who can make a difference. Players like Emmanuel Martin and Maddox Zaidan-Jones—those young boys can come out there and make a real difference for us. So, I think we are in a much better place now than the last time."

== Career statistics ==
=== Club ===
As of end of 2025–26 season

Appearances and goals by club, season and competition
Club	Season	League			FA Cup		League Cup		Other		Total	
Club	Season	Division	Apps	Goals	Apps	Goals	Apps	Goals	Apps	Goals	Apps	Goals
Pickering Town	2025–26	NCEFL Premier Division	5	0	0	0	—		0 (Note: Appearance(s) in FA Vase)	0	0	0
Career total			5	0	0	0	0	0	0	0	0	0

=== International goals ===
Scores and results list the Turks and Caicos Islands' goal tally first.

No.	Date	Venue	Opponent	Score	Result	Competition
1	12 October 2024	FFB Stadium, Belmopan, Belize	Anguilla	1–0	2–1	2024–25 CONCACAF Nations League C
Last updated 6 August 2026

=== International career statistics ===
As of match played 16 August 2025.

Turks and Caicos national team
2023	6	0
2024	6	1
2025	2	0
Total	14	1
