= Christopher James Gannon =

Association football player (born 1969)

Chris Gannon
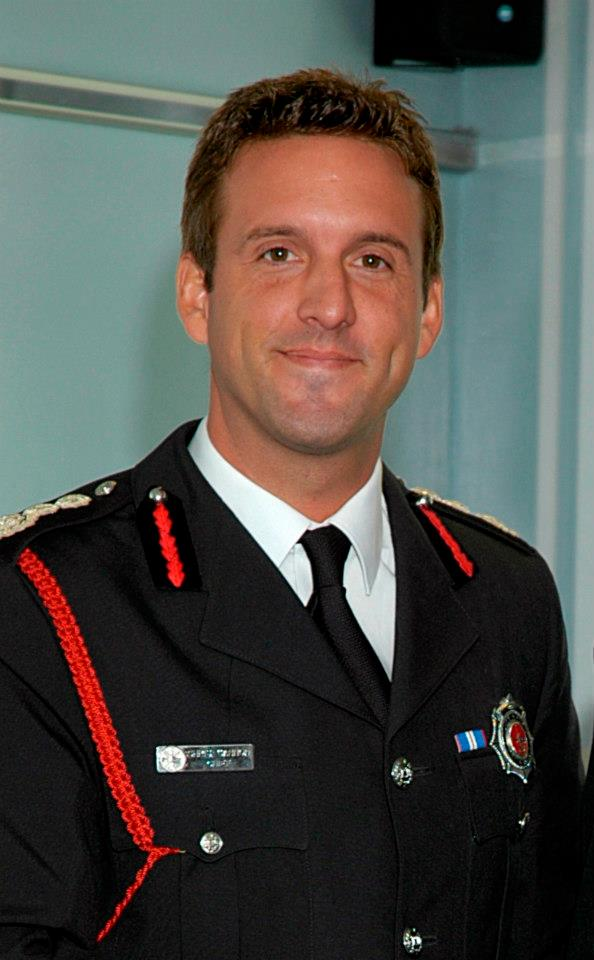

Personal information
- Full name: Christopher James Gannon
- Date of birth: 13 May 1969 (age 57)
- Place of birth: Westminster, London, England
- Position: Defender

International career
Years	Team	Apps	(Gls)
2004–2008	Turks and Caicos	4	(0)

Christopher James Gannon (born 13 May 1969) is a former footballer. Born in England, he made four appearances for the Turks and Caicos national team.

== Early life ==
Gannon was born in Westminster, London and grew up in Chelsea before moving to Welwyn Garden City in Hertfordshire.

== Career ==
=== Football ===
Gannon spent his UK playing career in the semi professional divisions of the Isthmian, Jewson and United Counties Leagues. He also latterly played in the Peterborough Premier League winning titles with both Molins FC and Pearl Assurance FC.

While working in the Turks and Caicos Islands, Gannon was selected to represent the country as a central defender in their FIFA World Cup qualification campaigns in 2004 and 2008, An article published by Bloomberg said that the players had to raise finance for their own travel fees for away games. Gannon later stated that the Turks and Caicos Islands FA were 'strongly encouraged' by FIFA and CONCACAF to field an almost entirely expatriate team in World Cup qualifying games to justify receipt of funds from the FIFA "Goal" programme.

=== Fire services ===
Gannon established and became the first Fire Chief of the Turks and Caicos Islands Fire and Rescue Service in the British West Indies. He served in the role for 6 years during which time he created the first domestic volunteer service, marine rescue, and consolidated the domestic fire service with the Civil Aviation Fire Department.https://publications.parliament.uk/pa/cm200708/cmselect/cmfaff/memo/147/uc22802.htm
