= Maddox Zaidan-Jones =

Turks and Caicos Islander footballer (born 2008)

Personal information
- Full name: Maddox Lawrence Zaidan-Jones
- Date of birth: 6 February 2008 (age 18)
- Place of birth: New York, United States
- Position: Midfielder

Team information
- Current team: Fulham U21
- Number: 53

Youth career
- 2026–: Fulham

International career^{‡}
Years	Team	Apps	(Gls)
2024–	Turks and Caicos Islands	2	(0)
- ‡ National team caps and goals as of 13:45, 21 September 2026 (UTC)

Maddox Zaidan-Jones (born 6 February 2008) is a Turks and Caicos Islander association footballer who currently plays for Fulham U21 in the Premier League 2, and the Turks and Caicos Islands national team.

== Club career ==
In 2017, Zaidan-Jones played for Lightning City FC in the Fortis TCI Youth League. Over the next several years, he had links to Provo Premier League clubs Academy Eagles, SWA Sharks, and Cheshire Hall.

He then moved to the United States to attend high school at the Berkshire School, a private boarding school in Sheffield, Massachusetts. In 2024, he was tied as the team's leading scorer. In 2025, Berkshire's boys soccer program was ranked the third-best prep school program in the United States by Sports Illustrated. The publication noted that Zaidan-Jones was one player receiving major interest from college soccer programs.

In summer 2025, Zaidan-Jones went on a week-long trial with Premier League club Fulham and Queens Park Rangers of the EFL Championship. During his time with Fulham, he played the full ninety minutes of a pre-season victory over Charlton Athletic. After leaving the Berkshire School, he returned to Fulham FC during the 2026 pre-season. During his second stint with the club, he appeared for Fulham in a number of matches and scored against the under-21 sides of Gil Vicente, Hampton & Richmond Borough, and Charlton Athletic. In August 2026, the club announced it had signed Zaidan-Jones with the intent that the player would initially join the club's under-21 team.

== International career ==
Born in the United States, Zaidan-Jones moved to the Turks and Caicos Islands at a young age. He is also eligible to represent England and Canada internationally. At the youth level, he represented the Turks and Caicos Islands in 2025 CONCACAF U-17 World Cup qualification. He tallied two assists as the territory defeated Anguilla 3–0 to open its qualification campaign. Zaidan-Jones was called up to the senior national team for the first time in September 2024 at age sixteen for 2024–25 CONCACAF Nations League C matches against Anguilla and Belize. He made his debut on 4 September in the team's opening match against Anguilla.

=== International career statistics ===
As of match played 7 September 2024.

Turks and Caicos national team
2024	2	0
Total	2	0
