= Samuel Harvey =

Samuel Harvey may refer to:

- Samuel Harvey (VC) (1881–1960), British Victoria Cross recipient.
- Samuel Harvey (politician) (1885–1959), British politician from the Conservative Party
- Samuel Harvey (footballer) (born 2009), Turks and Caicos Islands football goalkeeper
