= Samuel Harvey (footballer) =

Turks and Caicos Islands footballer (born 2009)

Personal information
- Full name: Samuel Harvey II
- Date of birth: 15 October 2009 (age 17)
- Place of birth: Turks and Caicos Islands
- Position: Goalkeeper

Team information
- Current team: Seattle Sounders

Youth career
- –2025: Cheshire Hall
- 2025: AFC Academy
- 2025–: Seattle Sounders

Senior career*
Years	Team	Apps	(Gls)
2023–2025	Cheshire Hall	6+	(0)
2025	AFC Academy	0	(0)
2025–	Seattle Sounders	0	(0)

International career^{‡}
2025–	Turks and Caicos Islands U17	4	(0)
2024–	Turks and Caicos Islands U20	2	(0)
2024–	Turks and Caicos Islands	2	(0)
- * Club domestic league appearances and goals ‡ National team caps and goals as of 23:02, 26 November 2025 (UTC)

Samuel "Sammy" Harvey II (born 15 October 2009) is a Turks and Caicos Islands footballer who plays as a goalkeeper for Major League Soccer club Seattle Sounders and the Turks and Caicos Islands national team.

== Club career ==
At the age of five, Samuel Harvey became interested in football through his sister, and he initially played as a left-back until he joined Cheshire Hall.

Samuel Harvey joined WIV Provo Premier League club Cheshire Hall in 2023 and made six appearances during the 2023–24 season as their starting goalkeeper at the ages of 13 and 14. In 2024, his senior international debut caught the attention of clubs in North America and Europe with the player being invited to trial with Queens Park Rangers of the EFL Championship. Later that year, Harvey joined the SPIRE Academy, an elite sports performance and education boarding school in Ohio, United States. He earned a 4.0 grade point average and was named the team's Rookie of the Year for the 2023/2024 season.

He joined AFC Academy in July 2025 as the backup to Sebastian Turbyfield and was gicen the shirt number 13. Harvey made one appearance for the club during the 2025 CFU Club Shield on 3 August 2025 during the 2–0 loss against Club Franciscain as his team finished fourth.

In August 2025, he had trials with Major League Soccer clubs Nashville and Seattle Sounders, and he joined the academy of Seattle Sounders on 12 November 2025.

== International career ==
=== Youth ===
Aged 13, Samuel Harvey was called up to the Turks and Caicos Islands U20 by Aaron Lawrence in 2023 and he converted Harvey into a goalkeeper. He then made his debut for the U20 side during a 2–1 defeat against Antigua and Barbuda U20 during 2024 CONCACAF U-20 Championship qualifying on 27 February 2024.

He also represented the Turks and Caicos Islands U17 during 2025 CONCACAF U-17 World Cup qualification, debuting during a 3–0 win against Anguilla U17 on 7 February 2025.

=== Senior ===
Harvey made his debut for the senior Turks and Caicos Islands team during a 2–0 defeat against Anguilla during the 2024–25 CONCACAF Nations League on 4 September 2024; he was 14 years and 328 days old on his debut (this would make him the third youngest player to debut for Turks and Caicos Islands, and the twelfth youngest international footballer).

He was called up for the 2025 Outrigger Challenge Cup matches against the United States Virgin Islands and the Marshall Islands on 13 and 16 August 2025 but he did not appear in either match.

== Career statistics ==
=== International ===
As of match played 13 October 2024

Appearances and goals by national team and year
National team	Year	Apps	Goals
Turks and Caicos Islands	2024	2	0
Turks and Caicos Islands	2025	0	0
Total		2	0
