= Fulham F.C. Under-21s and Academy =

Football academy in London, England

The Fulham F.C. Academy is a football academy based at the Motspur Park Athletics Stadium at Motspur Park in London.

The Academy, headed by director Sean Cullen, runs along the lines of many of the English football academies as deemed appropriate by the national governing body, and recently awarded Category 2 status in the new EPPP guidelines set out by the FA. Players dealt with by the academy can be aged as young as nine years old. As part of their training, young players are guided with the aim to gain a BTEC and NVQ qualification.

The Fulham FC Foundation’s Player Pathway programme offers structured coaching for players with prior football experience (U7–U16), delivered by FA-qualified and UEFA-qualified staff. Training follows a four-corner model that develops physical, technical/tactical, psychological, and social skills. Since 2022, the Academy has used performance-tracking technology from Israeli sports tech company Playermaker. The system’s footwear-mounted sensors collect technical and physical performance data, supporting training design, performance analysis, and inclusivity initiatives across youth squads.

== Current management ==
(As of Academy Staff)

Position	Name
Academy Director	(England) Sean Cullen
Technical Director	(England) Steve Wigley
Head of Academy Coaching	(England) Andrew Watt
Head of Football Development	(Wales) Huw Jennings
Under 21s Head Coach	(England) Vacant
Under 21s Assistant Coach	(England) Andrew Joslin
Under 18s Head Coach	(England) Ali Melloul
Under 18s Assistant Coach	(England) Tommy Wilkinson
Assistant Head of Player Development	(Wales) Dan Thomas
Performance Support Manager	(England) Gillian Myburgh
Head of Talent ID & Recruitment	(England) Malcom Elias
Head of Safeguarding & Inclusion	(England) Eleanor Rowland
Foundation Safeguarding Manager	(England) Gemma Taylor
Education and Player Care Tutor	(England) Georgia Henderson
Academy Player Care Mentor	(Guyana) Matthew Briggs
Post 16 Programme Lead Teacher	(England) Sarah Lipscombe
Equality, Diversity & Inclusion Coordinator	(England) Jamie Dapaah
Head of Academy Player Care & Designated Safeguarding Officer	(England) Claire-Marie Pomeroy

== Academy Players ==
=== PL2 ===
As of 26 August 2026

Note: Flags indicate national team as defined under FIFA eligibility rules; some limited exceptions apply. Players may hold more than one non-FIFA nationality.

No.	Pos.	Nation	Player
—	GK	ENG	Michael Allen
—	GK	USA	Alex Borto
—	GK	BIH	Dino Kaiser
—	GK	ENG	Alfie McNally
—	GK	CRO	Marco Underwood
—	DF	ENG	Samuel Amissah
—	DF	CAN	Luc de Fougerolles
—	DF	ENG	Eddy Nsasi

No.	Pos.	Nation	Player
—	DF	ENG	Bradley Slade
—	MF	ENG	Dan Casey
—	MF	ENG	Chibby Nwoko
—	MF	TCA	Maddox Zaidan-Jones
—	MF	GRN	Jayden Quashie
—	FW	BAN	Farhaan Ali Wahid
—	FW	IRL	Tom Olyott
—	FW	ENG	Terrell Works

==== Out on loan ====
Note: Flags indicate national team as defined under FIFA eligibility rules; some limited exceptions apply. Players may hold more than one non-FIFA nationality.

No.	Pos.	Nation	Player
—	GK	BIH	Dino Kaiser (at Uxbridge)
—	MF	NZL	Matt Dibley-Dias (at Newport County)
—	MF	WAL	Luke Harris (at Wigan Athletic)

No.	Pos.	Nation	Player
—	FW	SCO	Brodie Dair (at Queen of the South)
—	FW	ENG	Aaron Loupalo-Bi (at Fleetwood Town)
—	FW	BAN	Farhaan Ali Wahid (at Boreham Wood)

=== Under-18s ===
As of 5 July 2026

Note: Flags indicate national team as defined under FIFA eligibility rules; some limited exceptions apply. Players may hold more than one non-FIFA nationality.

No.	Pos.	Nation	Player
—	GK	ENG	Matt Bagot
—	GK	CZE	Damián Čech
—	DF	ENG	Nazim Benchaita
—	DF	ENG	Logan Cooke
—	DF	ENG	Kymarley Morrison
—	MF	ENG	Seth Chingwaro
—	MF	ENG	Dylan De-Gale
—	MF	LAT	Markuss Gomins
—	MF	ENG	Lewis Konadu-Wall

No.	Pos.	Nation	Player
—	MF	ENG	Seth Ridgeon
—	MF	ENG	Alfie White
—	FW	ENG	Anand Batra
—	FW	ENG	Tarrell Cavell
—	FW	SCO	Erskine Rennie
—	FW	CAN	Aidan Evans
—	FW	ENG	Bashil Lubega
—	FW	ENG	William Sutton-Bangura
—	FW	FRA	Macauley Zepa

== Academy graduates ==
Below is a comprehensive list of Academy graduates from recent history, details of their senior debut and where they are now.

=== 1997/98 ===
- Sean Davis v Cambridge United (Division Three), now retired

=== 1998/99 ===
- Luke Cornwall v Notts County (Division Two), now retired

=== 2000/01 ===
- Zat Knight v Northampton Town (EFL Cup First Round), now retired, has played for England
- Mark Hudson v Chesterfield Town (EFL Cup Second Round), now retired
- Elvis Hammond v Chesterfield Town (EFL Cup Second Round), now retired, has played for Ghana.
- Calum Willock v Huddersfield Town (Division One), now retired, has played for Saint Kitts and Nevis

=== 2002/03 ===
- Dean Leacock v Wigan Athletic (EFL Cup Fourth Round), now retired

=== 2003/04 ===
- Adam Green v Wigan Athletic (EFL Cup Second Round), now at Ashford Town
- Darren Pratley v Wigan Athletic (EFL Cup Second Round), now at Leyton Orient
- Zesh Rehman v Wigan Athletic (EFL Cup Second Round), now retired, has played for Pakistan
- Malik Buari v Everton (Premier League), now retired

=== 2004/05 ===
- Liam Rosenior v Boston United (EFL Cup Second Round), now retired
- Michael Timlin v Boston United (EFL Cup Second Round), now at Dulwich Hamlet
- Liam Fontaine v Southampton (Premier League), now retired, Manager of Dundee Reserves

=== 2006/07 ===
- Matthew Briggs v Middlesbrough (Premier League), now retired, has played for Guyana
- Elliot Omozusi v Wycombe Wanderers (EFL Cup Second Round), now a free agent

=== 2007/08 ===
- Wayne Brown v Bristol Rovers (FA Cup Third Round), now retired

=== 2008/09 ===
- Robert Milsom v Burnley (EFL Cup Third Round), now at Dorking Wanderers
- Chris Smalling v Everton (Premier League), now at Al-Fayha FC, has played for England

=== 2009/10 ===
- Joe Anderson v Manchester City (EFL Cup Third Round), now retired

=== 2011/12 ===
- Lauri Dalla Valle v NSÍ Runavík (Europa League Qualifier), now retired
- Kerim Frei v NSÍ Runavík (Europa League Qualifier), now at Elazığspor, has played for Turkey
- Tom Donegan v Crusaders (Europa League Qualifier), last known to be a free agent
- Neil Etheridge v Odense Boldklub (Europa League Group Stage), now at Buriram United, has played for Philippines
- Marcello Trotta v Everton (FA Cup Fourth Round), now at SS Turris Calcio
- Alexander Kačaniklić v Norwich City (Premier League), now a free agent, has played for Sweden

=== 2012/13 ===
- Alex Smith v West Bromwich Albion (Premier League), now a free agent

=== 2013/14 ===
- Mesca v Chelsea (Premier League), now a free agent
- Moussa Dembélé v West Ham United (Premier League), now at Al-Ettifaq FC
- Dan Burn v Norwich City (FA Cup Third Round), now at Newcastle United
- Chris David v Norwich City (FA Cup Third Round), now at Yeni Mersin İdmanyurdu
- Ange-Freddy Plumain v Norwich City (FA Cup Third Round), now at AS Nea Salamis Ammohostu, has played for Guadeloupe
- Lasse Vigen Christensen v Norwich City (FA Cup Third Round), now a free agent
- Muamer Tanković v Norwich City (FA Cup Third Round), now at Pafos, has played for Sweden
- Josh Passley v Sheffield United (FA Cup Fourth Round), now at Ebbsfleet United
- Cauley Woodrow v Cardiff City (Premier League), now at Blackburn
- Patrick Roberts v Manchester City (Premier League), now at Sunderland

=== 2014/15 ===
- Emerson Hyndman v Ipswich Town (EFL Championship), last at Memphis 901, has played for United States
- Cameron Burgess v Ipswich Town (EFL Championship), now at Ipswich Town
- Jesse Joronen v Ipswich Town (EFL Championship), now at Venezia, has played for Finland
- George Williams v Millwall (EFL Championship), now at Hemel Hempstead, has played for Wales
- Seán Kavanagh v Wolverhampton Wanderers (EFL Championship), now at Shamrock Rovers
- Ryan Williams v Wolverhampton Wanderers (EFL Championship), now at Bengaluru, has played for Australia
- Marcus Bettinelli v Brentford (EFL Cup Second Round), now at Chelsea
- Stephen Arthurworrey v Derby County, (EFL Cup Fourth Round), now retired
- Jack Grimmer v Brighton & Hove Albion (EFL Championship), now at Wycombe Wanderers

=== 2016/17 ===
- Ryan Sessegnon v Leyton Orient (EFL Cup First Round), now at Fulham
- Dennis Adeniran v Leyton Orient (EFL Cup First Round), now at St Mirren
- Tayo Edun v Leyton Orient (EFL Cup First Round), now at Peterborough United
- Luca de la Torre v Leyton Orient (EFL Cup First Round), now at San Diego, has played for United States
- Stephen Humphrys v Derby County (EFL Championship), now at Barnsley

=== 2017/18 ===
- Marek Rodák v Wycombe Wanderers (EFL Cup First Round), now at Al-Ettifaq, has played for Slovakia
- Matt O'Riley v Wycombe Wanderers (EFL Cup First Round), now at Brighton
- Steven Sessegnon v Wycombe Wanderers (EFL Cup First Round), now at Wigan

=== 2018/19 ===
- Harvey Elliott v Millwall (EFL Cup Third Round), now at Liverpool

=== 2019/20 ===
- Tyrese Francois v Southampton (EFL Cup Second Round), now at Wigan
- Ben Davis v Southampton (EFL Cup Second Round), now at Uthai Thani, has played for Thailand
- Martell Taylor-Crossdale v Southampton (EFL Cup Second Round), now at Welling
- Jay Stansfield v Aston Villa (FA Cup Third Round), now at Birmingham City
- Sylvester Jasper v Manchester City (FA Cup Fourth Round), now at Śląsk Wrocław

=== 2020/21 ===
- Fábio Carvalho v Sheffield Wednesday (EFL Cup Third Round), now at Brentford

=== 2021/22 ===
- Adrion Pajaziti v Birmingham City (EFL Cup Second Round), still at Fulham

=== 2022/23 ===
- Luke Harris v Crawley Town (EFL Cup Second Round), still at Fulham
- Terry Ablade v Crawley Town (EFL Cup Second Round), still at Fulham
- Martial Godo v Crawley Town (EFL Cup Second Round), still at Fulham
- Marlon Fossey v Crawley Town (EFL Cup Second Round), now at Standard Liège, has played for United States

=== 2023/24 ===
- Luc de Fougerolles v Ipswich Town (EFL Cup Fourth Round), still at Fulham, has played for Canada
- Devan Tanton v Ipswich Town (EFL Cup Fourth Round), still at Fulham, has played for Colombia

=== 2024/25 ===
- Josh King v Birmingham City (EFL Cup Second Round), still at Fulham
