= Jack McKnight =

Turks and Caicos Islands footballer (born 1994)

Personal information
- Date of birth: 10 June 1994 (age 32)
- Place of birth: Hong Kong
- Position: Forward

Senior career*
Years	Team	Apps	(Gls)
- AFC Academy
2019–	VEC Dublin		

International career^{‡}
2011–	Turks and Caicos Islands	8	(0)
- * Club domestic league appearances and goals as of 29 March 2021 ‡ National team caps and goals as of 2 January 2022

Jack McKnight (born 10 June 1994) is a Turks and Caicos Islands footballer. Born in Hong Kong, he represents the Turks and Caicos Islands internationally.

== Career statistics ==
=== International ===
As of match played 26 March 2021.

National team	Year	Apps	Goals
Turks and Caicos Islands	2011	2	0
Turks and Caicos Islands	2014	3	0
Turks and Caicos Islands	2021	3	0
Total		8	0
