= Matthew Green (football manager) =

Matthew Green is an English teacher, football player and football manager.

He taught in the Bahamas at Temple Christian High School, where he coached the school's boys and girls soccer teams. He also started a women's club, Revolution FC, which won four league titles and three cup competitions and was manager of the FC Nassau women's team which won the WFL league and cup titles. Green was made U20 Bahamas Women's national coach in 2003 and Director of Women's Football in the Bahamas. In the Bahamas, Green also played for a number of teams in the National Football League. He was the leading goal scorer in the league for Grasshoppers FC in the 1999–2000 and 2000–2001 seasons and for East End FC in the 2002–2003 season. He was also the player-manager for the FC Nassau men's team, which won the NFL 2 title in 2006.

In 2004, Green took up a role as Technical Director of the Turks and Caicos Islands Football Association, replacing Paul Crosbie. There he increase the popularity of the sport.

Since 2018, Green has taught in Indonesia and oversees the Tigers Football Academy.

== Early life and education ==
Green graduated from the University of Hull in 1995 with a bachelor of arts degree in history. In 1998, he completed a postgraduate certificate in education and moved to the Bahamas to take up a teaching position at Temple Christian High School.

== Career ==
=== Bahamas ===
Within a few years, Green turned Temple Christian High School into one of the major power houses in Bahamian soccer as his school programme soon became the most progressive and active in the country. His senior high girls team won the BAISS championship from 2001 until 2007 and were undefeated during this time. His boys team could not quite match this success as they lost in four championship finals during this time.

Green also started his own women's club called Revolution FC which won four league titles and three cup competitions. Before leaving the Bahamas, Green was manager of the FC Nassau women's team which won both the WFL league and cup titles. Green was also player manager for the FC Nassau men's team, which won the NFL 2 title in 2006. While in the Bahamas, Green himself played for a variety of teams in the National Football League and was the leading goal scorer in the league for Grasshoppers FC in the 1999–2000 and 2000–2001 season. He repeated this feat for East End FC in the 2002–2003 season.

Green was made U20 Bahamas Women's national coach in 2003 and under his guidance the team saw a dramatic improvement in their results with a 1–1 draw away from home against the Dominican Republic, a 3–0 victory over Haiti and a 5–0 win against St. Kitts and Nevis. Green was given the role of Director of Women's Football in the Bahamas. However, the offer of moving to local rivals, the Turks and Caicos Islands as Technical Director in 2007 was an offer he could not refuse.

=== Turks & Caicos ===
As Technical Director of the Turks and Caicos Islands Football Association, Green made history as the Men's National Team, under his guidance won their first ever World Cup Qualifying game with a 2–1 win against St. Lucia, taking them up to their highest FIFA ranking of 154.

For several years, Green's tenure saw a huge surge in popularity of the sport as he developed the game at all levels, noticeably youth and women's football. Green was also a strong supporter of Beach Soccer and the TCIFA became the first Caribbean Association to have senior Men / Women and Youth leagues.

Green's National Women's team also saw success with their first ever international win with a 4–0 victory over the British Virgin Islands in 2009.

=== Return to UK ===
Green relocated to the UK in 2014 where he returned to teaching at Sirius Academy School.

=== Indonesia ===
In August 2018, Green moved to Surabaya in Indonesia where he has taken up a teaching post at the Surabaya European School, a position which has allowed him an opportunity to set up a football and basketball programme at the school. He currently teaches History and Global Perspectives and oversees the Tigers Football Academy.
