= Keith Jeffrey =

Trinidadian football manager

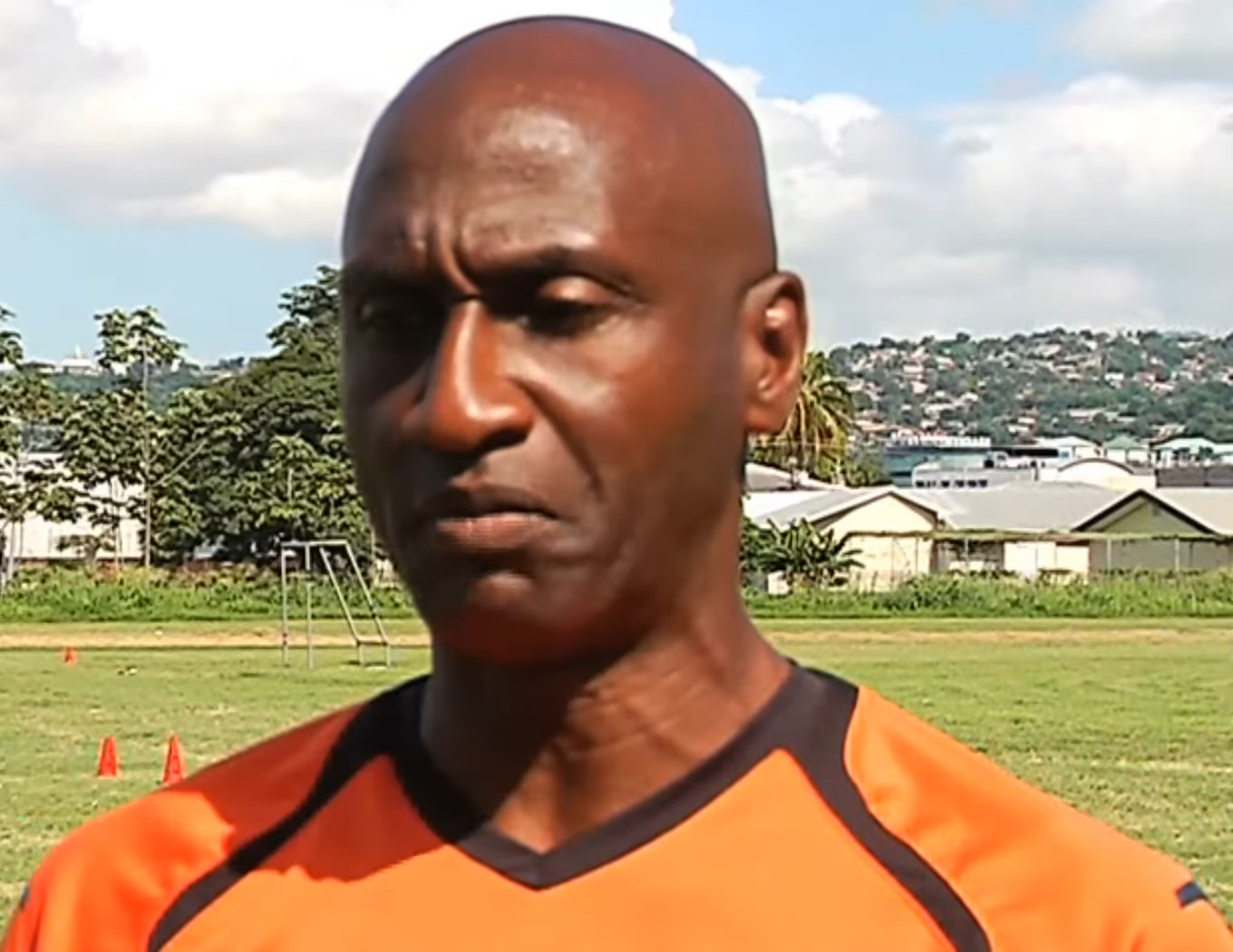
- Jeffrey in 2016

Personal information
- Date of birth: 4 October 1963 (age 63)
- Place of birth: Trinidad and Tobago

Managerial career
- Years: Team
- 2013–2020: San Juan Jabloteh
- 2022–2023: Turks and Caicos Islands
- 2023: Turks and Caicos Islands
- 2024–: Anguilla

Keith Jeffrey (born 4 October 1963) is a Trinidadian football manager who manages the Anguilla national football team.

== Career ==
Jeffrey started his managerial career with Trinidadian side San Juan Jabloteh, helping them win the 2014 Trinidad and Tobago Classic. In 2022, he was appointed manager of the Turks and Caicos Islands.
