= Matt Barnes (soccer) =

American soccer coach (born 1972)

Personal information
- Full name: Matthew Barnes
- Date of birth: 1972 (age 53–54)
- Place of birth: Bakersfield, California, United States

College career
Years	Team	Apps	(Gls)
1991–1995	Judson Eagles		

Senior career*
Years	Team	Apps	(Gls)
1996	Rockford Raptors		

Managerial career
- 2016: Midland-Odessa Sockers
- 2018–2019: Turks and Caicos
- * Club domestic league appearances and goals

Matt Barnes is an American soccer coach.

Barnes was inducted into the Judson Eagles' Hall of Fame. Barnes has a B.A. in Physical Education and General Science from Judson University, and an M.S. in Special Education from National University.

He played one season in the USISL in 1996 with the Rockford Raptors.

In August 2018, he was appointed as head coach of the Turks and Caicos national football team, while they were last placed in the FIFA rankings.

Barnes is currently the Sporting Director for Danish club FC Helsingør.
