= Gary Brough =

Turks and Caicos Islands football manager

Personal information
- Place of birth: Turks and Caicos Islands

Managerial career
- Years: Team
- 2011–2014: Turks and Caicos Islands

Gary Brough is a Turks and Caicos Islands professional football manager. In 2011, he coached the Turks and Caicos Islands national football team.
