= Vieux Fort Comprehensive Secondary School =

Secondary school in Vieux Fort, Saint Lucia

Coordinates: 13.7503°N 60.9647°W

Information
- Established: 1963; 63 years ago
- Teaching staff: c.100
- Enrollment: c.1700

Vieux Fort Comprehensive Secondary School or V.F.C.S.S located in the Caribbean island of Saint Lucia has two Campuses. Campus A consists of Forms 1 and 2 whilst Campus B consists of Forms 3 to 5. Although now Campus A and B are becoming full-fledged secondary schools. A the moment Campus B educates students of Form 1, 2, 3, 4 and 5.

Founded in 1963 as Vieux Fort Secondary School, it was the first government secondary school in Saint Lucia.

At V.F.C.S.S, there are about 1,700 students attending and more than 100 teachers working at the school.

Campus A which nestled on the south-eastern edge of the town of Vieux Fort in the area known as Beanefield is managed by Mr. Auguste. The second campus, located in La Ressourse is directed by principal Mr Cyril.

Vieux Fort Comprehensive Secondary School is the largest secondary school on the island of St. Lucia. Apart from the five forms that complete the secondary section of the school, there is an additional sixth form and a Post secondary Department. The A Level and Post Secondary Departments are tertiary extensions to V.F.C.S.S. These are two-years tertiary programs that are offered to applicants succeeding in five or more CXC subjects. At A Level, students have the options of selecting three A Level subjects from any of the following areas: French, Spanish, Sociology, English Literature, History, Biology, Chemistry, Physics, Geography, Economics, Management of Business, Mathematics, Travel and Tourism and Accounts. A Level students also have the option of writing CAPE with CXC in specific subject areas.

The Post Secondary students complete diploma programs in either Business Studies, Secretarial Studies or Carpentry and Joinery Studies. The Post Secondary Department is coordinated by Steven Auguste.

== Notable alumni ==
- Kenny Anthony, former Prime Minister of Saint Lucia
- Louis George, former Minister for Education
- Zaine Pierre, international footballer
- Daren Sammy, cricketer
