= Zaine Pierre =

Saint Lucian international footballer (born 1993)

Personal information
- Full name: Zaine Kareem Pierre
- Date of birth: 21 September 1993 (age 33)
- Place of birth: Dennery, Saint Lucia
- Height: 1.79 m (5 ft 10 1/2 in)
- Position: Midfielder

Team information
- Current team: La Clery (manager)

Youth career
- 2007–2009: Vieux Fort

Senior career*
Years	Team	Apps	(Gls)
2009–2010	Square United		
2010–2012	W Connection	1	(0)
2012–2015	Genoa	0	(0)
2014	→ Messina (loan)	1	(0)
2014	→ Aversa Normanna (loan)	10	(0)
2015–2016	W Connection		
2017–2018	Novigrad	15	(0)

International career
- Saint Lucia U17
2011	Saint Lucia U23	3	(1)
2010–2019	Saint Lucia	13	(1)

Managerial career
- 2023–: La Clery
- * Club domestic league appearances and goals

Zaine Kareem Pierre (born 21 September 1993) is a Saint Lucian former international footballer who played as a midfielder. He is currently the manager of Saint Lucia SemiPro Football League club La Clery.

== Club career ==
Born in Dennery, Pierre began his career with Vieux Fort and Square United. On 24 February 2010, he joined TT Pro League club W Connection. He made his debut for Trinidadian club W Connection on 20 September 2010. Earlier that month, Pierre had gone on trial with English team Stoke City. Pierre has also trialled with English clubs Arsenal, Tottenham Hotspur and Manchester City, and has attracted attention from a number of Spanish sides.

In August 2011, Pierre went on trial with Italian club Genoa, signing for them in April 2012. On 19 January 2014, Pierre was called up to the Genoa senior squad for the first time in a match against Inter Milan. He spent loan spells at Messina and Aversa Normanna, before returning to W Connection for the 2015–16 season.

== International career ==
Pierre made his senior debut for Saint Lucia in 2010, and has played in FIFA World Cup qualifying matches for them.

== Managerial career ==
Pierre became the manager of La Clery when the Saint Lucia SemiPro Football League was founded in 2023. He won the league's Best Manager award for the inaugural 2024 season, and he also won the league in 2024 and 2025.

== International goals ==
Scores and results list Saint Lucia's goal tally first.

#	Date	Venue	Opponent	Score	Result	Competition	Report
1.	September 6, 2011	Beausejour Stadium, Gros Islet, Saint Lucia	Saint Kitts and Nevis	1–4	2–4	2014 FIFA World Cup qualification	Report
Last updated 22 October 2012
