= Alex Bryan =

Turks and Caicos Islands footballer

Personal information
- Date of birth: 12 May 1994 (age 32)
- Place of birth: Helsinki, Finland
- Height: 1.87 m (6 ft 2 in)
- Position: Center-back

Team information
- Current team: AFC Academy

Senior career*
Years	Team	Apps	(Gls)
2014–	AFC Academy		

International career^{‡}
2015–	Turks and Caicos Islands	8	(0)
- * Club domestic league appearances and goals ‡ National team caps and goals as of 17 June 2019

Alexander Bryan (born 12 May 1994) is a Turks and Caicos Islander footballer who plays as a defender for AFC Academy and the Turks and Caicos Islands national football team.

Bryan is the son of former Turks and Caicos Islands national football team player Christopher Bryan.

== Career ==
=== International ===
Bryan made his senior international debut on 23 March 2015 in a 6–2 defeat to Saint Kitts and Nevis during World Cup Qualifying.
