= Oliver Smith (football coach) =

Turks and Caicos Islands football manager

Personal information
- Full name: Oliver A. Smith
- Date of birth: 13 September 1960 (age 66)
- Place of birth: Turks and Caicos Islands

Managerial career
- Years: Team
- 2015-2017: Turks and Caicos Islands

Oliver A. Smith (born 13 September 1960) is a Turks and Caicos Islands football executive and former manager of the national team of Turks and Caicos Islands. He is currently the general secretary of the Turks and Caicos Islands Football Association.
