= Guillermo Ocampo =

Argentine footballer (born 1994)

Personal information
- Full name: Guillermo Gabriel Ocampo
- Date of birth: 19 May 1994 (age 32)
- Place of birth: Isidro Casanova, Argentina
- Height: 1.75 m (5 ft 9 in)
- Position: Midfielder

Team information
- Current team: Los Andes (on loan from Almirante Brown)

Youth career
- Almirante Brown

Senior career*
| Years | Team | Apps | (Gls) |
| 2015–2024 | Almirante Brown | 111 | (2) |
| 2022 | → Los Andes (loan) | 11 | (1) |
| 2024 | CSD Liniers | | |
| 2024- | Metropolitan FA | 70 | (3) |
- * Club domestic league appearances and goals as of 17:48, 8 June 2022 (UTC)

Guillermo Gabriel Ocampo (born 19 May 1994) is an Argentine professional footballer who plays as a midfielder for Los Andes, on loan from Almirante Brown.

== Career ==
Ocampo started out his senior career with Almirante Brown. Osvaldo Rodríguez selected Ocampo for his senior debut on 1 April 2015 versus Flandria in the Copa Argentina, which preceded him appearing in Primera B Metropolitana for the first time later that month against the same opponents. Two years later, in April 2017, Ocampo scored a brace in a victory away to San Telmo. He made his 100th career appearance on 23 February 2019 versus Sacachispas. On 17 February 2022, Ocampo joined Los Andes on a loan deal for the rest of 2022.

== Career statistics ==
As of 24 April 2019.

Appearances and goals by club, season and competition
| Club | Season | League | | | Cup | | League Cup | | Continental | | Other | | Total | |
| Club | Season | Division | Apps | Goals | Apps | Goals | Apps | Goals | Apps | Goals | Apps | Goals | Apps | Goals |
|---|---|---|---|---|---|---|---|---|---|---|---|---|---|---|
| Almirante Brown | 2015 | Primera B Metropolitana | 20 | 0 | 1 | 0 | — | | — | | 0 | 0 | 21 | 0 |
| Almirante Brown | 2016 | Primera B Metropolitana | 7 | 0 | 0 | 0 | — | | — | | 0 | 0 | 7 | 0 |
| Almirante Brown | 2016–17 | Primera B Metropolitana | 29 | 2 | 0 | 0 | — | | — | | 0 | 0 | 29 | 2 |
| Almirante Brown | 2017–18 | Primera B Metropolitana | 25 | 0 | 0 | 0 | — | | — | | 0 | 0 | 25 | 0 |
| Almirante Brown | 2018–19 | Primera B Metropolitana | 23 | 0 | 0 | 0 | — | | — | | 0 | 0 | 23 | 0 |
| Career total | | | 104 | 2 | 1 | 0 | — | | — | | 0 | 0 | 105 | 2 |
