= Sebastian Turbyfield =

Turks and Caicos Islander footballer (born 2002)

Personal information
- Full name: Sebastian Guy Turbyfield
- Date of birth: 19 December 2002 (age 23)
- Height: 1.87 m (6 ft 2 in)
- Position: Goalkeeper

Team information
- Current team: Palm Beach Flames
- Number: 1

Senior career*
Years	Team	Apps	(Gls)
2018–2019	Beaches		
2019–2020	Charlton Rovers	4	(0)
2020–2022	Academy Eagles		
2022–2023	SWA Sharks		
2023–2024	Academy Eagles		
2024–	Palm Beach Flames	18	(0)

International career^{‡}
2021–	Turks and Caicos Islands	13	(0)
- * Club domestic league appearances and goals ‡ National team caps and goals as of 00:05, 30 June 2025 (UTC)

Sebastian Turbyfield (born 19 December 2002) is a Turks and Caicos Islander association footballer who currently plays for UPSL club Palm Beach Flames and the Turks and Caicos Islands national team.

== Club career ==
As a youth, Turbyfield played for All Stars FC in the Sailrock Boys Under-12 competition. He later played for his school team at the Ashcroft School. In 2013, the team reached the quarter-final of the TCIFA Interschool Tournament.

For the 2019/2020 season, Turbyfield played for Charlton Rovers AFC in the Cheltenham Association Football League. He made four appearances for the club that season.

He was part of the SWA Sharks team that competed in the 2023 CONCACAF Caribbean Shield.

In 2024, Turbyfield joined Palm Beach Flames SC of the United Premier Soccer League in the United States. He was the club's starting goalkeeper in 2025 U.S. Open Cup qualification, the first edition of the U.S. Open Cup in which the club took part. Palm Springs Flames won their debut, a 2–1 victory over the USSL's Miami Soccer Academy in the Second Qualifying Round. The club was knocked out by fellow UPSL side Harbor City FC in the next round.

== International career ==
Turbyfield received his first call up to the senior national team in March 2019 for a 2019–20 CONCACAF Nations League qualifying match against the British Virgin Islands. He made his senior international debut on 5 June 2021 in a 2022 FIFA World Cup qualification match against Haiti. He was later named to the 2023–24 CONCACAF Nations League C Best XI following his individual performance which helped secure a 2–2 draw with the British Virgin Islands.

=== International career statistics ===
As of match played 15 October 2024.

Turks and Caicos national team
2021	1	0
2022	3	0
2023	6	0
2024	3	0
Total	13	0

== Other sports ==
Turbyfield is also a member of the Turks and Caicos Islands national beach soccer team. He was part of the squad that competed in the 2023 CONCACAF Beach Soccer Championship. As a member of the Turks and Caicos Islands national rugby sevens team, Turbyfield played in the 2021 RAN Sevens. He then returned to the squad for the 2022 edition of the tournament.
