= Mackenson Cadet =

Turks and Caicos Islands footballer

Personal information
- Date of birth: January 20, 2000 (age 26)
- Place of birth: Providenciales, Turks and Caicos Islands
- Height: 6 ft 0 in (1.83 m)
- Position: Midfielder

Team information
- Current team: Hardin–Simmons Cowboys
- Number: 5

College career
Years	Team	Apps	(Gls)
2017–2018	ASA Miami Silver Storm	14	(2)
2019–2021	Hardin–Simmons Cowboys	44	(10)

Senior career*
Years	Team	Apps	(Gls)
2016–2019	AFC Academy		
2023–2024	Cavalier	18	(0)
2024–	SWA Sharks		

International career^{‡}
2018–	Turks and Caicos Islands	24	(0)
- * Club domestic league appearances and goals as of 03:21, 1 July 2025 (UTC) ‡ National team caps and goals as of 03:21, 1 July 2025 (UTC)

Mackenson Cadet (born January 20, 2000) is a Turks and Caicos Islands international footballer. He is currently studying at the Hardin–Simmons University

== Career ==
=== College ===
After transferring from ASA Miami to Hardin–Simmons, Cadet was named the American Southwest Conference (ASC) Midfielder of the Year in 2019 and the ASC Co-Offensive Player of the Year the following season.

=== International ===
Cadet made his senior international debut on 22 March 2018 in a 4-0 friendly defeat to the Dominican Republic.

== Career statistics ==
=== International ===
As of matches played 2 October 2020.

National team	Year	Apps	Goals
Turks and Caicos Islands	2018	2	0
Turks and Caicos Islands	2019	2	0
Total		4	0
