= David Lowery (footballer) =

English footballer (born 1984)

Personal information
- Full name: David Joseph Lowery
- Date of birth: 20 January 1984 (age 42)
- Place of birth: Newcastle upon Tyne, England
- Position: Forward

Team information
- Current team: SWA Sharks
- Number: 9

Youth career
- 1999: Tottenham Hotspur

Senior career*
Years	Team	Apps	(Gls)
2000–2002	South Shields	31	(20)
2002–2003	Gateshead	34	(28)
2006	SWA Sharks	26	(13)
2009	Chemfica Independent F.C. (Northern Football Alliance)	6	(0)

International career^{‡}
2008–	Turks and Caicos Islands	2	(1)
- * Club domestic league appearances and goals as of 4 November 2007 ‡ National team caps and goals as of 11 December 2008

David Joseph Lowery (born 20 January 1984) is an English football striker who plays for the SWA Sharks of MFL League.

== Club career ==
Lowery once played for Tottenham Hotspur U-16. After an unsuccessful spell, he arrived back in the north east of England to play for a clutch of local clubs. He joined the Chemfica at the start of the 2009/10 season as their lead target man. Despite an early goal in pre-season, his term with the club ended with no competitive goals due to an achilles injury which has seen him not return to action since.

== International career ==
Lowery made his debut for the Turks and Caicos Islands in a World Cup qualification match against Saint Lucia in February 2008, scoring his first international goal. He also played in the return match, his only caps earned so far.
