= Saint Lucia SemiPro Football League =

- Founded: 2023
- First season: 2024
- Country: Saint Lucia
- Confederation: CONCACAF
- Number of clubs: 20 (overall)
- Level on pyramid: 1–2
- International cup: CFU Club Shield
- Current champions: Premier: La Clery; Super: Anse La Raye
- Most championships: Premier: La Clery (2 titles); Super: Anse La Raye; Vieux Fort-South (1 title each)
- Website: Official website

The Saint Lucia SemiPro Football League (SPFL) is a two-tier association football league of football in Saint Lucia. It is organized by the Saint Lucia Football Association.

== History ==
In April 2023, it was announced that the Saint Lucia Football Association decided to organize a new semi-professional league. The inaugural season began in June 2024, with the government financing for the first three years. In the inaugural season, Vieux Fort South won the Super League title, while La Clery were champions of the Premier League. For the second season, the schedule was switched to a double round-robin format, while prize money was increased to a total of EC $200,000. The number of venues was increased to ten.

== Structure ==
The competition consists of two tiers, the Premier League and the Super League. There is promotion and relegation between the two leagues.

== Clubs ==
During the inaugural season, the clubs represented SLFA's sub-association leagues, corresponding to the districts of Saint Lucia. For the 2025 season, the Saint Lucia national under-20 football team entered the Super League, increasing the number of teams to ten.

The following clubs competed in the leagues for the 2025 season.

=== Premier League (Tier I) ===
- Gros Islet
- Canaries
- Central Castries
- Choiseul
- Dennery
- La Clery
- Mabouya Valley
- Soufriere
- Vieux Fort-South
- South Castries

=== Super League (Tier II) ===
- Anse La Raye
- Babonneau
- Desruisseaux
- Laborie
- Micoud
- Mon Repos
- Marchand
- Roseau Valley
- Saint Lucia U20
- Vieux Fort-North

== List of winners ==
Season	Premier League (I)	Super League (II)	Ref(s).
2024	La Clery	Vieux Fort-South	
2025	La Clery	Anse La Raye	

== Individual awards ==
Season	Tier	Best manager	MVP	Top scorer	Best midfielder	Best defender	Best goalkeeper	Best young player	Ref.
2024
2024	Premier	Zaine Pierre (La Clery)	Simeon Francis (Central Castries)	Simeon Francis (Central Castries)	Simeon Francis (Central Castries)	Donil Lionel (La Clery)	Aaron Daniel (Central Castries)	Aron Daniel (Central Castries)	
2024	Super	Jamil Joseph (Vieux Fort South)	Dahmanii Bertheir (Anse La Raye)	Obafemi Poyotte (Vieux Fort South)	Romiel Charlerey (Roseau)	Kendall Clarke (Vieux Fort South)	Bernard Antoine (South Castries)	Bernard Antonie (Vieux Fort South)	

== SPFL clubs in international competition ==
Winners of the Premier League qualify to represent Saint Lucia in the CFU Club Shield. Inaugural champions La Clery was the first club from the league to participate in the competition, entering in 2025.

Club	Competition	Round	Opponent	Score	Ref.
La Clery	2025 CFU Club Shield	Group Stage	(Bonaire) Real Rincon	1–1	
La Clery	2025 CFU Club Shield	Group Stage	(Haiti) Capoise	w/o	
La Clery	2026 CFU Club Shield	First Round	(Anguilla) Roaring Lions	2–1	
La Clery	2026 CFU Club Shield	Round of 16	(Suriname) Robinhood	0–2	
