= Junior Paul =

Turks and Caicos Islander footballer (born 2001)

Personal information
- Date of birth: 14 June 2001 (age 25)
- Position: Forward

Team information
- Current team: SWA Sharks

Senior career*
Years	Team	Apps	(Gls)
–2017	SWA Sharks		
2017–2022	Academy Eagles		
2022–2025	SWA Sharks		
2025–2026	Academy Eagles		
2026–	SWA Sharks		

International career^{‡}
2022–	Turks and Caicos Islands	22	(7)
- * Club domestic league appearances and goals ‡ National team caps and goals as of 13:46, 30 September 2026 (UTC)

Junior Paul (born 14 June 2001) is a Turks and Caicos Islander association footballer who currently plays for SWA Sharks and the Turks and Caicos Islands national team.

== Club career ==
Paul was part of the SWA Sharks FC squad that competed in the 2022 Caribbean Club Shield. With the club's participation, it became the first team from Turks and Caicos to take part in an official international competition. With a 3–1 victory over Real Rincon that year, SWA Sharks earned the first victory by a TCI club in such a tournament, with Paul scoring the game-winning goal in the match. When the Provo Premier League returned for the 2023 Apertura, Paul scored in a 4–2 victory over Flamingo FC to open the season. He was named the MVP of the match for SWA Sharks.

Paul later competed in the 2025 CFU Club Shield with Academy Eagles. He scored a hattrick in a 5–0 victory over Rovers SC to advance to the semi-final. After earning a 0–0 draw with Moca FC in the next fixture, the contest was decided on penalties. Despite Paul converting his penalty attempt, the Eagles ultimately lost 4–5.

== International career ==
Paul made his senior international debut for the Turks and Caicos Islands on 12 May 2022 in a 2–4 friendly loss to the Bahamas. He scored his first senior international goal three days later against the same opponent. Later that year, he was included in the squad again for 2022–23 CONCACAF Nations League C. His performances in the competition included a goal against the United States Virgin Islands and a brace against Sint Maarten. Paul was voted to the League C Best XI at the conclusion of the competition. His three goals also made him the Turks and Caicos Islands' top scorer in that edition of the competition.

Paul was named to the squad again for the 2024-25 CONCACAF Nations League C as one of the more experienced players in the group. In 2025, he was selected to take part in that year's Outrigger Challenge Cup. He was tied for second-place in scoring with two goals in the friendly tournament, including a strike against the United States Virgin Islands and another against the Marshall Islands in the latter nation's second-ever match. On 29 September 2026, he scored in a 3–1 victory over the British Virgin Islands in the 2026–27 CONCACAF Nations League C.

=== International goals ===
Scores and results list the Turks and Caicos Islands' goal tally first.

No.	Date	Venue	Opponent	Score	Result	Competition
1	15 May 2022	Thomas Robinson Stadium, Nassau, Bahamas	Bahamas	2–0	2–0	Friendly
2	6 June 2022	Bethlehem Soccer Stadium, Upper Bethlehem, U.S. Virgin Islands	U.S. Virgin Islands	1–1	2–3	2022–23 CONCACAF Nations League C
3	14 June 2022	TCIFA National Academy, Providenciales, Turks and Caicos Islands	Sint Maarten	1–0	2–0	2022–23 CONCACAF Nations League C
4	14 June 2022	TCIFA National Academy, Providenciales, Turks and Caicos Islands	Sint Maarten	1–1	2–0	2022–23 CONCACAF Nations League C
5	13 August 2025	Jarrell Williams Bulldog Stadium, Springdale, United States	U.S. Virgin Islands	1–0	1–1	2025 Outrigger Challenge Cup
6	16 August 2025	Jarrell Williams Bulldog Stadium, Springdale, United States	Marshall Islands	2–1	3–1	2025 Outrigger Challenge Cup
7	29 September 2026	TCIFA National Academy, Providenciales, Turks and Caicos Islands	British Virgin Islands	2–0	3–0	2026–27 CONCACAF Nations League C
Last updated 30 September 2026

=== International career statistics ===
As of match played 30 September 2025.

Turks and Caicos national team
2022	6	4
2023	6	0
2024	6	0
2025	2	2
2026	2	1
Total	22	7
