= Charles Cook (footballer, born 1972) =

Welsh footballer and manager

Charlie Cook
Personal information
- Date of birth: 12 October 1972 (age 54)
- Place of birth: London, England
- Position: Midfielder

Senior career*
Years	Team	Apps	(Gls)
- Maidenhead United
- Hampton & Richmond
- Ware
- Hitchin Town
1999–2003	KPMG United		
2006–2007	KPMG United		
2007–2008	Grange Quins		

International career
2000–2008	Turks & Caicos Islands	7	(0)

Managerial career
- 1998–1999: British Virgin Islands
- Cardiff City Ladies
- 2006: Turks & Caicos Islands (caretaker)
- 2007–2008: Cardiff City Youth Academy
- Cardiff City (assistant)
- * Club domestic league appearances and goals

Charles Cook (born 12 October 1972) is an English professional football manager and former player.

== Club career ==
He played for English non-league sides Maidenhead United, Hampton & Richmond Borough, Ware F.C. and Hitchin Town. He also played for Grange Quins in the MacWhirter Welsh Football League Division Two, while he coached part-time with the Cardiff City youth academy. Previously, he worked with the Cardiff City Ladies at Ninian Park before they were disbanded and he was reassigned to the Academy. Currently he is a coach at Cardiff City.

== International career ==
Cook qualified to play for the Turks and Caicos national team through four-year residency from 1999 to 2003 while he played for the KPMG United FC. He had moved from the British Virgin Islands national team where he was a technical director alongside coach Gary White.

He made his playing debut for Turks and Caicos in a March 2000 FIFA World Cup qualification match against Saint Kitts and Nevis and earned a total of seven caps, scoring no goals. He represented the country in six World Cup qualification games. While playing for Turks and Caicos, Charlie received the Golden Boot at the first ever National Soccer Resort tournament in Miami, January 2003.

In 2006, he was appointed coach of the Turks and Caicos Islands national team.
