= Gavin Glinton =

Turks and Caicos Islands footballer (born 1979)

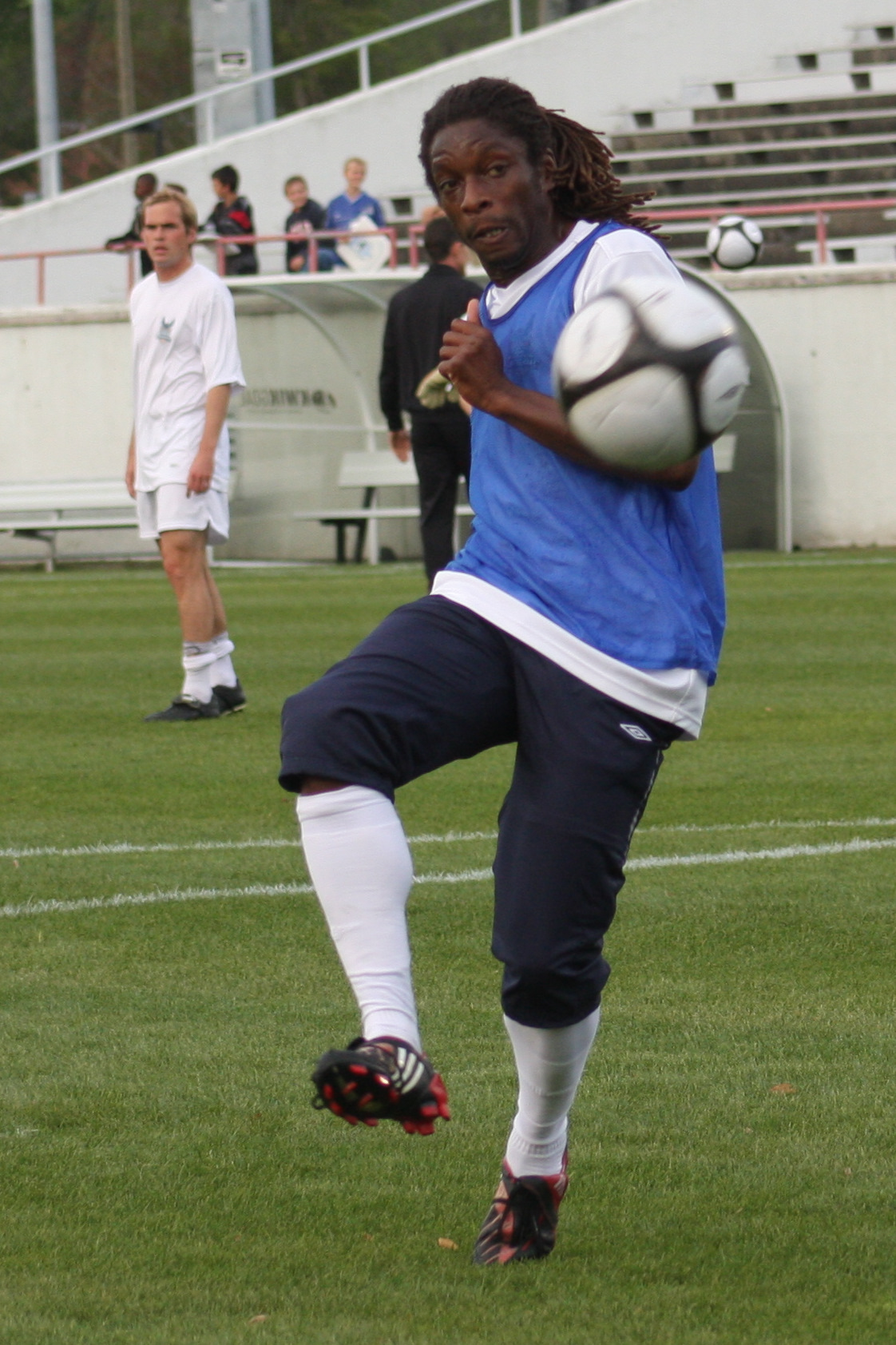

Personal information
- Date of birth: 1 March 1979 (age 47)
- Place of birth: Grand Turk, Turks & Caicos
- Height: 5 ft 11 in (1.80 m)
- Position: Striker

College career
Years	Team	Apps	(Gls)
1998–2001	Bradley Braves	75	(53)

Senior career*
Years	Team	Apps	(Gls)
2001	Chicago Fire Reserves	12	(13)
2002–2003	Los Angeles Galaxy	31	(3)
2003	Dallas Burn	10	(0)
2006	Charleston Battery	26	(13)
2006–2007	Los Angeles Galaxy	20	(4)
2008	San Jose Earthquakes	6	(0)
2009	Carolina RailHawks	16	(2)
2010–2011	Nam Định	45	(18)

International career
2004–2014	Turks and Caicos Islands	10	(4)

Managerial career
- 2004–2005: Bradley Braves (assistant)
- 2017–2019: Sacramento Republic (academy)
- 2020: New Mexico United (assistant)
- 2022–2024: Oakland Roots (assistant)
- 2024: Oakland Roots (interim)
- 2024–2025: Oakland Roots
- * Club domestic league appearances and goals

Gavin Glinton (born 1 March 1979) is a Turks and Caicos Islands football coach and former professional player. He is formerly the head coach for the Oakland Roots in the USL Championship, having previously served as an Assistant Coach for New Mexico United, and the U13 and U14 Academy Coach at Sacramento Republic FC. He played for the LA Galaxy, Dallas Burn, and San Jose Earthquakes in the MLS. He also played for the Charleston Battery and Carolina Railhawks in the USL.

== College and amateur career ==
Born in Grand Turk, Glinton grew up in Livermore, California, attended Livermore High School, played club soccer with Tri-Valley Premier. He also played PDL with the Silicon Valley Ambassadors, and played four years of college soccer at Bradley University, where he was a four-time All-American. He scored 53 career goals at Bradley, including 15 in 1998 and 2000, was named to the All-Missouri Valley Conference First-team all four seasons (becoming first player in league history to earn first team honours four times), and was named his team's offensive MVP all four years. During his college years he also played with the Chicago Fire Reserves in the Premier Development League. He was inducted into the Bradley University Hall of Fame in 2012 and the Missouri Valley Conference Hall of Fame in 2014.

== Club career ==
Glinton was drafted by Major League Soccer's Los Angeles Galaxy in 2002 before transferring to the Dallas Burn in 2003. His two-year totals include 44 games played with two goals and six assists. In 2004, he took a break from professional football to become assistant coach at his alma mater, Bradley University.

In 2006, he joined USL First Division team Charleston Battery for the 2006 season. After a successful season with the Battery where he led the team with 13 goals and was elected "Offensive MVP" by the fans, Glinton was called up by the Galaxy. He proved to be a great clutch player after the 2007 season. In the 2007 season, he was mostly used as a substitute by Galaxy coach Frank Yallop, where he scored 4 goals. Gavin followed Yallop to the San Jose Earthquakes when the coach selected him in the 2007 MLS Expansion Draft. The Earthquakes released him following the 2008 season. In February 2009, he had an unsuccessful two week trial with St Patrick's Athletic of the League of Ireland, whom he played for in a friendly game against Premier League club Chelsea, drawing 2–2. Later that month, he signed with the Carolina RailHawks in the USL First Division. He joined Nam Định F.C. of the V-League of Vietnam in March 2010.

== International career ==
Glinton plays for the Turks and Caicos Islands national team, and is their highest ever goalscorer with four goals. He scored one of the goals in the country's first ever win in a FIFA international over the Cayman Islands in a Caribbean Cup game in Cuba. He has earned eight caps in total, three of them in World Cup qualification games.

== Coaching career ==
After Oakland Roots parted ways with head coach Noah Delgado on 28 April 2024, Glinton was appointed as the club's interim head coach. On 12 November 2024, it was announced that Glinton would be appointed permanent manager for Oakland. On 2 June 2025, the club announced that they had parted ways with Glinton, citing disappointment with the team's on-field performances under his management.

== Personal life ==
Gavin's younger brother, Duane Glinton, formerly of the Ogden Outlaws in the Premier Development League, also played for the national team and was the all-time national team appearances record holder before being surpassed by Philip Shearer.

== Career statistics ==
=== International ===
Appearances and goals by national team and year
National team	Year	Apps	Goals
Turks and Caicos Islands	2004	1	0
Turks and Caicos Islands	2006	3	3
Turks and Caicos Islands	2008	2	1
Turks and Caicos Islands	2011	2	0
Turks and Caicos Islands	2014	2	0
Total		10	4

Scores and results list Turks and Caicos Islands' goal tally first, score column indicates score after each Glinton goal.

List of international goals scored by Gavin Glinton
No.	Date	Venue	Opponent	Score	Result	Competition	Ref.
1	4 September 2006	Estadio Pedro Marrero, Havana, Cuba	Cayman Islands	1–0	2–0	2007 Caribbean Cup qualification	
2	6 September 2006	Estadio Pedro Marrero, Havana, Cuba	Bahamas	1–0	2–3	2007 Caribbean Cup qualification	
3	6 September 2006	Estadio Pedro Marrero, Havana, Cuba	Bahamas	2–2	2–3	2007 Caribbean Cup qualification	
4	6 February 2008	TCIFA National Academy, Providenciales, Turks and Caicos Islands	Saint Lucia	2–0	2–1	2010 FIFA World Cup qualification	

== Honors ==
Los Angeles Galaxy

- MLS Cup: 2002
- Major League Soccer Supporter's Shield: 2002
