= Paul Crosbie =

British footballer (born 1976)

Personal information
- Date of birth: 25 November 1976 (age 49)
- Place of birth: Dumfries, Scotland
- Position: Midfielder

Senior career*
Years	Team	Apps	(Gls)
- ProvoPool Celtic

International career
2004–2006	Turks & Caicos Islands	4	(0)

Managerial career
- 2003–2006: Turks & Caicos Islands
- 2012–2014: March Town United
- 2016–: Huntingdon Town
- * Club domestic league appearances and goals

Paul Crosbie (born 25 November 1976) is a football player and manager who manages English non-league team Huntingdon Town.

== Football career ==
=== Managerial ===
Crosbie was a community football coach for Wimbledon between 1998 and 2003 but was made redundant due to the club's financial position. When unemployed, he found a job opening on the internet for the Technical Director position at the Turks and Caicos Islands Football Association, two weeks after first hearing of the Islands at the 2002 Commonwealth Games.

Crosbie became manager of the Turks and Caicos Islands national team in August 2003.

In June 2012, Crosbie became manager of English non-league team March Town United and he joined the Huntingdon Town coaching staff in June 2016.

=== Playing ===
He made four international appearances for Turks and Caicos Islands between 2004 and 2006, appearing in two 2006 FIFA World Cup qualifying matches for them.
