= 2025 CFU Club Shield =

Football tournament

Tournament details
- Host country: Trinidad and Tobago
- Dates: 26 July – 3 August
- Teams: 24 (from 23 associations)

Final positions
- Champions: (Dominican Republic) Moca (1st title)
- Runners-up: (Barbados) Weymouth Wales
- Third place: (Martinique) Club Franciscain
- Fourth place: (Turks and Caicos Islands) Academy Eagles

Tournament statistics
- Matches played: 28
- Goals scored: 88 (3.14 per match)
- Top scorer: (Barbados) Andre Applewhaite (5 goals)

The 2025 CFU Club Shield was the eighth edition of the CFU Club Shield, the second-tier annual international club football competition in the Caribbean region, held amongst the clubs affiliated with the Caribbean Football Union (CFU), a sub-confederation of CONCACAF. The tournament was played in Trinidad and Tobago between 26 July and 3 August 2025. Arnett Gardens of Jamaica were the defending champions.

Both the winners and the runners-up qualified to participate in the 2025 CONCACAF Caribbean Cup.

== Teams ==
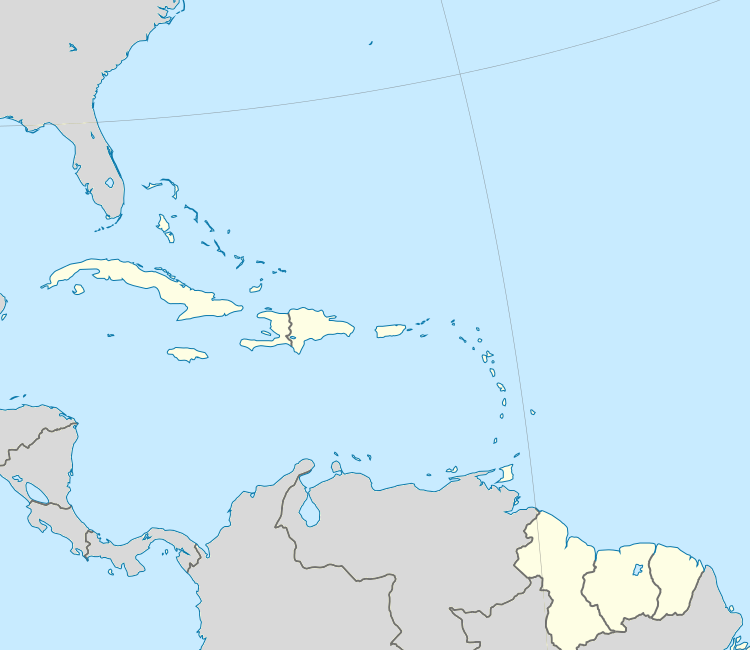
Location of teams of the 2025 CFU Club Shield
(H): Hosts

| Association | Team | Qualification method | App. (last) | Previous best (last) |
|---|---|---|---|---|
| Anguilla | Doc's United | 2024 AFA Senior Male League champions | 1st | Debut |
| Antigua and Barbuda | All Saints United | 2023–24 Antigua and Barbuda Premier Division champions | 1st | Debut |
| Aruba | SV Britannia | 2023–24 Aruban Division di Honor champions | 1st | Debut |
| Barbados | Weymouth Wales | 2024 Barbados Premier League champions | 3rd (2019) | Third place (2019) |
| Bonaire | Real Rincon | 2023–24 Bonaire League champions | 7th (2024) | Third place (2018) |
| British Virgin Islands | Wolues | 2023–24 BVIFA National Football League champions | 1st | Debut |
| Cayman Islands | Scholars International | 2023–24 Cayman Islands Premier League champions | 6th (2024) | Round of 16 (2024) |
| Dominica | Dublanc | 2024 Dominica Premier League champions | 2nd (2024) | Fourth place (2024) |
| Dominican Republic | Moca | 2025 Copa Dominicana de Fútbol non-finalists with 4th best aggregate record in regular season | 1st | Debut |
| French Guiana | Étoile Matoury | 2023–24 French Guiana Régional 1 champions | 3rd (2024) | Round of 16 (2024) |
| Grenada | Paradise FC International | 2024–25 GFA Premier League champions | 2nd (2024) | Preliminary round (2024) |
| Guyana | Guyana Defence Force | 2024 GFF Elite League champions | 3rd (2024) | Preliminary round (2024) |
| Haiti | Capoise | 2025 D1 Special Championship third place | 1st | Debut |
| Jamaica | Arnett Gardens | 2024–25 Jamaica Premier League third place | 2nd (2024) | Champions (2024) |
| Saint Lucia | La Clery | 2024 Saint Lucia SemiPro Football League champions | 1st | Debut |
| Martinique | Club Franciscain | 2023–24 Martinique Championnat National champions | 4th (2020) | Champions (2018) |
| Puerto Rico | Academia Quintana | 2024 Liga Puerto Rico Clausura champions | 1st | Debut |
| Saint Kitts and Nevis | St. Paul's United | 2024 SKNFA Premier League champions | 3rd (2023) | Group stage (2023) |
| Sint Maarten | SCSA Eagles | 2023–24 Sint Maarten Premier League champions | 2nd (2024) | Preliminary round (2024) |
| Suriname | Transvaal | 2024 Suriname Major League runners-up | 1st | Debut |
| Trinidad and Tobago (H) | Police | 2024–25 TT Premier Football League third place | 1st | Debut |
| Trinidad and Tobago (H) | Port of Spain | 2024–25 TT Premier Football League fourth place | 1st | Debut |
| Turks and Caicos Islands | Academy Eagles | 2023–24 Provo Premier League champions | 1st | Debut |
| U.S. Virgin Islands | Rovers | 2024 USVISF Premier League champions | 1st | Debut |

== Schedule ==
The schedule of the competition was as follows.

| Round | Dates |
|---|---|
| Group stage | 26–29 July |
| Semi-finals | 1 August |
| Third place match | 3 August |
| Final | 3 August |

== Group stage ==
=== Group A ===
| Pos | Team | Pld | W | D | L | GF | GA | GD | Pts | A4 | A2 | A5 | A3 | A1 | A6 |
|---|---|---|---|---|---|---|---|---|---|---|---|---|---|---|---|
| 1 | (Turks and Caicos Islands) Academy Eagles | 2 | 2 | 0 | 0 | 8 | 0 | +8 | 6 (Note: Ranked on fair play points: Academy Eagles 0, Academia Quintana −1.) | — | | | | | |
| 2 | (Puerto Rico) Academia Quintana | 2 | 2 | 0 | 0 | 8 | 0 | +8 | 6 | | — | | | | |
| 3 | (Saint Lucia) La Clery | 2 | 1 | 1 | 0 | 4 | 1 | +3 | 4 | | | — | | | |
| 4 | (Bonaire) Real Rincon | 2 | 0 | 1 | 1 | 1 | 4 | −3 | 1 | | | | — | | |
| 5 | (Haiti) Capoise | 2 | 0 | 0 | 2 | 0 | 6 | −6 | 0 | | | | | — | |
| 6 | (United States Virgin Islands) Rovers | 2 | 0 | 0 | 2 | 0 | 10 | −10 | 0 | | | | | | — |

Source: CONCACAF
Legend: Blue = home team win; Yellow = draw; Red = away team win.
Notes:
26 July 2025
17:00

| Academia Quintana (Puerto Rico) | 5–0 | (United States Virgin Islands) Rovers |
|---|---|---|
| Marrero 21'; Fernández 38'; Faisca 59'; Rivera 72'; Hernández 73' | Report |

Hasely Crawford Stadium, Port of Spain
26 July 2025
17:00

| Real Rincon (Bonaire) | 1–1 | (Saint Lucia) La Clery |
|---|---|---|
| Cicilia 79' | Report | St. Romain 66' |

Ato Boldon Stadium, Couva
26 July 2025
19:00

| Capoise (Haiti) | 0–3 w/o | (Turks and Caicos Islands) Academy Eagles |
|---|---|---|
| | Report |

Hasely Crawford Stadium, Port of Spain
28 July 2025
14:00

| Capoise (Haiti) | 0–3 w/o | (Saint Lucia) La Clery |
|---|---|---|
| | Report |

Larry Gomes Stadium, Malabar
28 July 2025
14:00

| Academia Quintana (Puerto Rico) | 3–0 | (Bonaire) Real Rincon |
|---|---|---|
| Nieves 33'; Guardia 83', 85' | Report |

Hasely Crawford Stadium, Port of Spain
28 July 2025
14:00

| Academy Eagles (Turks and Caicos Islands) | 5–0 | (United States Virgin Islands) Rovers |
|---|---|---|
| Stewart 14'; Paul 17', 51', 85'; Belizaire 74' | Report |

Ato Boldon Stadium, Couva

=== Group B ===
| Pos | Team | Pld | W | D | L | GF | GA | GD | Pts | B1 | B6 | B2 | B5 | B4 | B3 |
|---|---|---|---|---|---|---|---|---|---|---|---|---|---|---|---|
| 1 | (Dominican Republic) Moca | 2 | 2 | 0 | 0 | 2 | 0 | +2 | 6 | — | | | | | |
| 2 | (Grenada) Paradise FC International | 2 | 1 | 1 | 0 | 5 | 3 | +2 | 4 | | — | | | | |
| 3 | (Aruba) SV Britannia | 2 | 1 | 1 | 0 | 3 | 1 | +2 | 4 | | | — | | | |
| 4 | Guyana Defence Force | 2 | 1 | 0 | 1 | 2 | 1 | +1 | 3 | | | | — | | |
| 5 | (French Guiana) Étoile Matoury | 2 | 0 | 0 | 2 | 2 | 5 | −3 | 0 | | | | | — | |
| 6 | (Saint Kitts and Nevis) St. Paul's United | 2 | 0 | 0 | 2 | 0 | 4 | −4 | 0 | | | | | | — |

Source: CONCACAF
Legend: Blue = home team win; Yellow = draw; Red = away team win.
26 July 2025
14:00

| St. Paul's United (Saint Kitts and Nevis) | 0–2 | Guyana Defence Force |
|---|---|---|
| | Report | Nelson 45+4' (pen.); Macey 90' |

Larry Gomes Stadium, Malabar
Referee: Ken Pennyfeather (Antigua and Barbuda)
26 July 2025
16:00

| SV Britannia (Aruba) | 1–1 | (Grenada) Paradise FC International |
|---|---|---|
| Boekhoudt 68' | Report | Williams 35' |

Larry Gomes Stadium, Malabar
Referee: Andrew Samuel (Trinidad and Tobago)
26 July 2025
19:00

| Moca (Dominican Republic) | 1–0 | (French Guiana) Étoile Matoury |
|---|---|---|
| Ventura 40' | Report |

Ato Boldon Stadium, Couva
28 July 2025
16:00

| Moca (Dominican Republic) | 1–0 | Guyana Defence Force |
|---|---|---|
| Parra 14' | Report |

Larry Gomes Stadium, Malabar
Referee: Amaury Majors (Bermuda)
28 July 2025
16:00

| SV Britannia (Aruba) | 2–0 | (Saint Kitts and Nevis) St. Paul's United |
|---|---|---|
| De Sousa 45'; Boekhoudt 78' | Report |

Hasely Crawford Stadium, Port of Spain
Referee: Cleon Culley (Barbados)
28 July 2025
16:00

| Étoile Matoury (French Guiana) | 2–4 | (Grenada) Paradise FC International |
|---|---|---|
| Boutou 13'; Habbo 40' (pen.) | Report | Williams 64', 73'; Isaac 80'; Maitland 90+' |

Ato Boldon Stadium, Couva
Referee: Micheal Akangou (Cayman Islands)

=== Group C ===
| Pos | Team | Pld | W | D | L | GF | GA | GD | Pts | C4 | C2 | C3 | C1 | C5 | C6 |
|---|---|---|---|---|---|---|---|---|---|---|---|---|---|---|---|
| 1 | (Barbados) Weymouth Wales | 2 | 2 | 0 | 0 | 11 | 1 | +10 | 6 | — | | | | | |
| 2 | (Suriname) Transvaal | 2 | 1 | 1 | 0 | 3 | 0 | +3 | 4 | | — | | | | |
| 3 | (Antigua and Barbuda) All Saints United | 2 | 1 | 1 | 0 | 3 | 1 | +2 | 4 | | | — | | | |
| 4 | (Trinidad and Tobago) Police (H) | 2 | 1 | 0 | 1 | 7 | 4 | +3 | 3 | | | | — | | |
| 5 | (Sint Maarten) SCSA Eagles | 2 | 0 | 0 | 2 | 2 | 9 | −7 | 0 | | | | | — | |
| 6 | (British Virgin Islands) Wolues | 2 | 0 | 0 | 2 | 0 | 11 | −11 | 0 | | | | | | — |

Source: CONCACAF
Legend: Blue = home team win; Yellow = draw; Red = away team win.
(H) Hosts
27 July 2025
14:00

| Transvaal (Suriname) | 3–0 | (British Virgin Islands) Wolues |
|---|---|---|
| Bhoi 26'; Keizerweerd 69'; Hecbert 90+6' | Report |

Larry Gomes Stadium, Malabar
27 July 2025
16:00

| All Saints United (Antigua and Barbuda) | 3–1 | (Sint Maarten) SCSA Eagles |
|---|---|---|
| Challenger 9'; Isaac 17'; Deterville 45+3' | Report | Chilin 63' |

Larry Gomes Stadium, Malabar
27 July 2025
19:00

| Police (Trinidad and Tobago) | 1–3 | (Barbados) Weymouth Wales |
|---|---|---|
| Allen 45+2' | Report | Applewhaite 4', 43'; Harewood 88' |

Hasely Crawford Stadium, Port of Spain
29 July 2025
16:00

| Police (Trinidad and Tobago) | 6–1 | (Sint Maarten) SCSA Eagles |
|---|---|---|
| Sitney 25'; Hutchinson 33'; Freitas 54', 63'; Jones 74', (pen.) | Report | Tavernier 69' |

Hasely Crawford Stadium, Port of Spain
29 July 2025
16:00

| Transvaal (Suriname) | 0–0 | (Antigua and Barbuda) All Saints United |
|---|---|---|
| | Report |

Larry Gomes Stadium, Malabar
29 July 2025
16:00

| Weymouth Wales (Barbados) | 8–0 | (British Virgin Islands) Wolues |
|---|---|---|
| Headley; Stewart 34', 70'; Holligan 45+2', 47'; Applewhaite 80' (pen.), 88' (pen.); Lashley 90' | Report |

Ato Boldon Stadium, Couva

=== Group D ===
| Pos | Team | Pld | W | D | L | GF | GA | GD | Pts | D2 | D5 | D1 | D4 | D3 | D6 |
|---|---|---|---|---|---|---|---|---|---|---|---|---|---|---|---|
| 1 | (Martinique) Club Franciscain | 2 | 2 | 0 | 0 | 7 | 1 | +6 | 6 | — | | | | | |
| 2 | (Trinidad and Tobago) Port of Spain (H) | 2 | 2 | 0 | 0 | 6 | 2 | +4 | 6 | | — | | | | |
| 3 | (Jamaica) Arnett Gardens | 2 | 1 | 0 | 1 | 5 | 4 | +1 | 3 | | | — | | | |
| 4 | (Dominica) Dublanc | 2 | 1 | 0 | 1 | 2 | 5 | −3 | 3 | | | | — | | |
| 5 | (Cayman Islands) Scholars International | 2 | 0 | 0 | 2 | 1 | 3 | −2 | 0 | | | | | — | |
| 6 | (Anguilla) Doc's United | 2 | 0 | 0 | 2 | 2 | 8 | −6 | 0 | | | | | | — |

Source: CONCACAF
Legend: Blue = home team win; Yellow = draw; Red = away team win.
(H) Hosts
27 July 2025
17:00

| Club Franciscain (Martinique) | 6–1 | (Anguilla) Doc's United |
|---|---|---|
| Clervil 3'; Priam 4', 90+3'; Jougon 39'; Marajo 56'; Delor 84' | Report | James 55' |

Ato Boldon Stadium, Couva
27 July 2025
17:00

| Port of Spain (Trinidad and Tobago) | 2–1 | (Cayman Islands) Scholars International |
|---|---|---|
| Wilson 28'; McFee 85' | Report | Brown 47' |

Hasely Crawford Stadium, Port of Spain
27 July 2025
19:00

| Arnett Gardens (Jamaica) | 4–0 | (Dominica) Dublanc |
|---|---|---|
| G. Taylor 9'; Smith 12', 16'; C. Taylor 90+2' | Report |

Ato Boldon Stadium, Couva
29 July 2025
14:00

| Port of Spain (Trinidad and Tobago) | 4–1 | (Jamaica) Arnett Gardens |
|---|---|---|
| Henry 24', 78'; McFee 65'; Chavez 90+3' | Report | Jones 77' |

Hasely Crawford Stadium, Port of Spain
29 July 2025
14:00

| Club Franciscain (Martinique) | 1–0 | (Cayman Islands) Scholars International |
|---|---|---|
| Attelly 58' | Report |

Ato Boldon Stadium, Couva
29 July 2025
14:00

| Dublanc (Dominica) | 2–1 | (Anguilla) Doc's United |
|---|---|---|
| Thomas 54'; Royer 73' | Report | Ricketts 79' |

Larry Gomes Stadium, Malabar

== Knockout stage ==
=== Bracket ===
Semi-finals
1 August – Couva
(Turks and Caicos Islands) Academy Eagles | 0 (4)
(Dominican Republic) Moca (p) | 0 (5)
1 August – Couva
(Barbados) Weymouth Wales | 2
(Martinique) Club Franciscain | 1

Final
3 August – Couva
(Dominican Republic) Moca | 3
(Barbados) Weymouth Wales | 2
Third place match
3 August – Couva
(Turks and Caicos Islands) Academy Eagles | 0
(Martinique) Club Franciscain | 2

=== Semi-finals ===
1 August 2025
17:00

| Academy Eagles (Turks and Caicos Islands) | 0–0 | (Dominican Republic) Moca |
|---|---|---|
| | Report |
Penalties
| Pluviose (penalty missed); Stewart (penalty scored); De Bellot (penalty scored); Paul (penalty scored); Innocent (penalty scored) | 4–5 | (penalty scored) Puga; (penalty scored) Dabas; (penalty scored) Jimenez; (penalty scored) Francisco; (penalty scored) De Pena |

Ato Boldon Stadium, Couva
Referee: Sanchez Bass (Saint Kitts and Nevis)

1 August 2025
19:00

| Weymouth Wales (Barbados) | 2–1 | (Martinique) Club Franciscain |
|---|---|---|
| Neblett 26'; Stewart 39' | Report | Marajo 12' |

Ato Boldon Stadium, Couva
Referee: José Corporan (Dominican Republic)

=== Third place match ===
3 August 2025
17:00

| Academy Eagles (Turks and Caicos Islands) | 0–2 | (Martinique) Club Franciscain |
|---|---|---|
| | Report | Abaul 13'; Priam 85' |

Ato Boldon Stadium, Couva
Referee: Adrian Lage Perez (Cuba)

=== Final ===
3 August 2025
19:00

| Moca (Dominican Republic) | 3–2 | (Barbados) Weymouth Wales |
|---|---|---|
| Azcona 24'; Dabas 75'; Ventura 82' | Report | Applewhaite 86'; Brathwaite 87' |

Ato Boldon Stadium, Couva
Referee: Ken Pennyfeather (Antigua and Barbuda)

== See also ==
- 2025 Leagues Cup
- 2025 CONCACAF Central American Cup
- 2025 CONCACAF Caribbean Cup
- 2026 CONCACAF Champions Cup
