= Turks and Caicos Islands national football team =

Men's association football team

Turks and Caicos Islands
- Association: Turks and Caicos Islands Football Association (TCIFA)
- Confederation: CONCACAF (North America)
- Sub-confederation: CFU (Caribbean)
- Head coach: Aaron Lawrence
- Most caps: Billy Forbes (40)
- Top scorer: Billy Forbes (22)
- Home stadium: TCIFA National Academy
- FIFA code: TCA
First colours	Second colours

FIFA ranking
- Current: 204 ▲1 (7 October 2026)
- Highest: 158 (February 2008)
- Lowest: 211 (October 2018)

First international
- Bahamas 3–0 Turks and Caicos Islands (Nassau, Bahamas; 24 February 1999)

Biggest win
- Sint Maarten 2–5 Turks and Caicos Islands (Willemstad, Curaçao; 10 October 2019); British Virgin Islands 0–3 Turks and Caicos Islands (Providenciales, Turks and Caicos Islands; 29 September 2026); Turks and Caicos Islands 3–0 British Virgin Islands (Providenciales, Turks and Caicos Islands; 4 October 2026)

Biggest defeat
- Cuba 11–0 Turks and Caicos Islands (Havana, Cuba; 8 September 2018)

The Turks and Caicos Islands national football team represents the Turks and Caicos Islands, a British overseas territory in men's international football, and is governed by the Turks and Caicos Islands Football Association, the governing body for football in the Turks and Caicos Islands founded in 1996. It has been a full member of FIFA and CONCACAF since 1998, and is also a member of CFU in the Caribbean Zone.

The Turks and Caicos Islands has never qualified for the FIFA World Cup and the CONCACAF Gold Cup, but has participated five times in League C of the CONCACAF Nations League.

The Turks and Caicos Islands' debut in international competition was in the 1999 Caribbean Cup qualifying tournament, and its first appearance in World Cup qualifiers was for 2002 qualification. The team's first victory was in 2006 by defeating Cayman Islands 2–0 in the first qualifying round for the 2007 Caribbean Cup.

== History ==
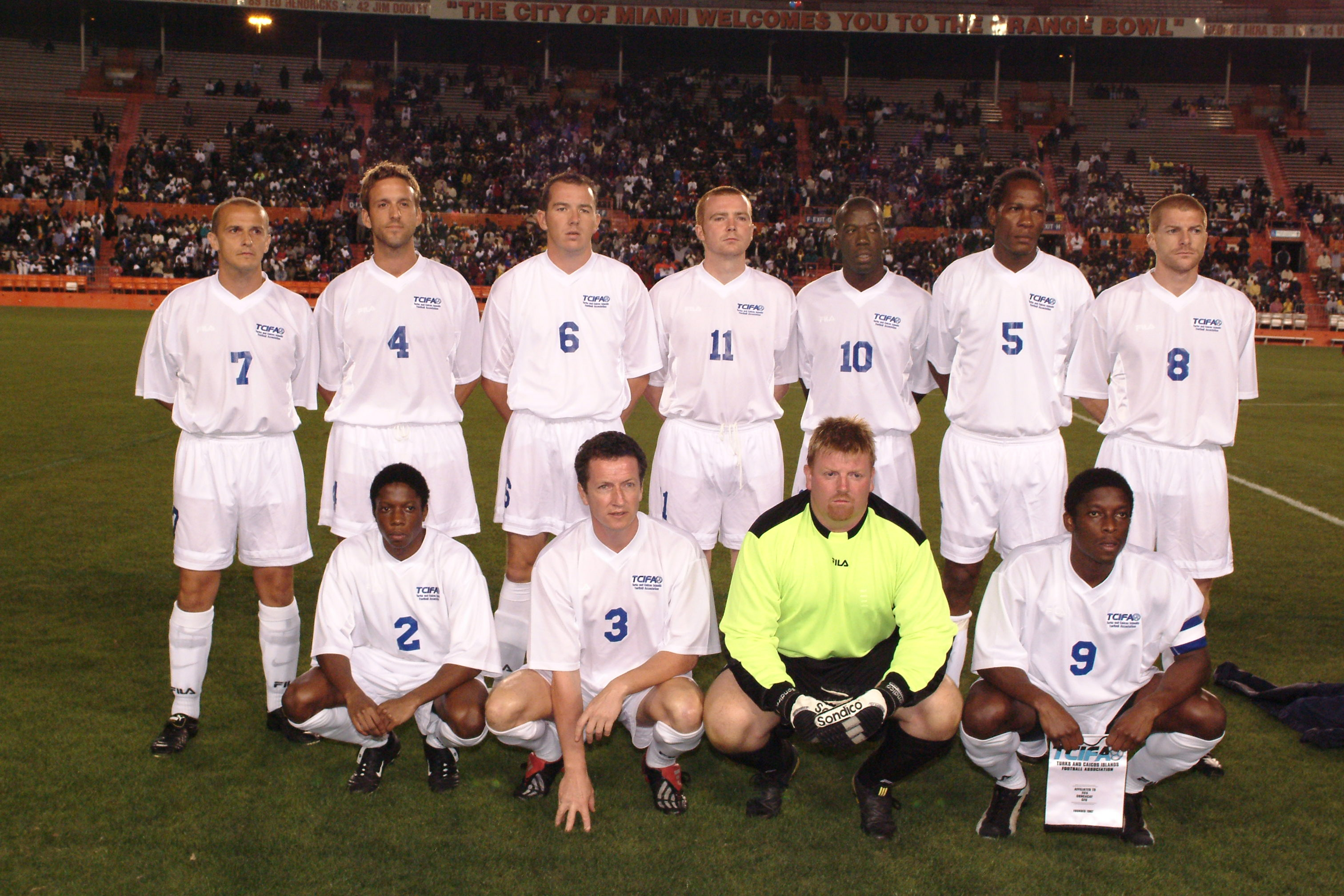
Turks and Caicos Islands team in 2004

Having formed a football association in 1996 and joined FIFA in 1998, Turks and Caicos Islands made its first appearance at an official FIFA competition when they entered the 2002 World Cup qualification. In March 2000, the team was knocked out in the first qualification round by St. Kitts and Nevis 14–0 on aggregate.

At the 2006 World Cup qualifying competition, the side suffered a 7–0 aggregate loss against Haiti in February 2004.

In 2007, the federation completed construction of their first stadium, the Turks and Caicos National Stadium, with the help of the FIFA Goal programme, and have committed themselves to building a broad base of football participation and support.

On February 6, 2008, the team achieved its first World Cup qualification win 2–1 against Saint Lucia in the CONCACAF first round at home, but in the second leg played March 26, 2008, they were eliminated after they fell short having lost the away leg 0–2 in Saint Lucia for a 2–3 aggregate score.

The team went without a victory in an official game until June 3, 2014, when they beat the British Virgin Islands during the 2014 Caribbean Cup qualification, and as a result jumped from 207th to 181st in the FIFA rankings released during that month.

== Coaches ==
- (Turks and Caicos Islands) Gino Pacitto (1999–2000)
- (Turks and Caicos Islands) Paul Crosbie (2003–2004)
- (Turks and Caicos Islands) Charlie Cook (2006)
- (England) Matthew Green (2008–2011)
- (Turks and Caicos Islands) Gary Brough (2011–2014)
- (England) Craig Harrington (2014–2015)
- (Turks and Caicos Islands) Oliver Smith (2015–2018)
- (United States) Matt Barnes (2018–2019)
- (Jamaica) Omar Edwards (2019–2022)
- (Belgium) Vital Borkelmans (2022)
- (Trinidad and Tobago) Keith Jeffrey (2022–2023)
- (England) Hayden Mullins (2023)
- (Trinidad and Tobago) Keith Jeffrey (2023)
- (England) Ricky Hill (2023–2023)
- (Jamaica) Aaron Lawrence (2023–present)

== Results and fixtures ==
The following is a list of match results in the last 12 months, as well as any future matches that have been scheduled.

Win Draw Loss Fixture

=== 2026 ===
23 September 2026 2026–27 CONCACAF Nations League C	Turks and Caicos Islands	0–2	Montserrat	TCIFA National Academy, Providenciales
15:00		Report	Boatswain 41', 69'	Referee: Jordan Chaibriant (Guadeloupe)

29 September 2026 2026–27 CONCACAF Nations League C	British Virgin Islands	0–3	Turks and Caicos Islands	TCIFA National Academy, Providenciales
15:00		Report	Forbes 9', 74'; Paul 52'	Attendance: 152; Referee: César Nolasco (El Salvador)

4 October 2026 2026–27 CONCACAF Nations League C	Turks and Caicos Islands	3–0	British Virgin Islands	TCIFA National Academy, Providenciales
15:00	Hutchinson 37'; Robertson 90+2'; Clare 90+6' (pen.)	Report		Referee: Akil Weeks (Trinidad and Tobago)

6 October 2026 2026–27 CONCACAF Nations League C	Montserrat	4–1	Turks and Caicos Islands	TCIFA National Academy, Providenciales
16:00	Taylor 3' (pen.), 45+4' (pen.); Baker 82'; Boatswain 90'	Report	Forbes 81'	Referee: Alexi Perry (Jamaica)

== Players ==
=== Current squad ===
The following players were called up for the 2026–27 CONCACAF Nations League C matches in September and October 2026.

Caps and goals correct as of 6 October 2026, after the match against British Virgin Islands.

No.	Pos.	Player	Date of birth (age)	Caps	Goals	Club
1	GK	Sebastian Turbyfield	19 December 2002 (age 23)	16	0	(Turks and Caicos Islands Football Association) Academy Eagles
13	GK	Samuel Harvey	15 October 2009 (age 17)	4	0	(United States Soccer Federation) Seattle Sounders
18	GK	Edwin Garland	28 September 2010 (age 16)	0	0	(Turks and Caicos Islands Football Association) SWA Sharks
2	DF	Keniel Clervil	23 June 2005 (age 21)	8	2	(Turks and Caicos Islands Football Association) Academy Eagles
3	DF	Steven Sessegnon	18 May 2000 (age 26)	4	0	(The Football Association) AFC Wimbledon
4	DF	Anthony Stewart	September 18, 1992 (age 34)	4	0	(The Football Association) Bedford Town
5	DF	Kyle Belizaire	26 May 2006 (age 20)	11	0	(Jamaica Football Federation) Cavalier
6	DF	Christopher Louisy	6 April 2005 (age 21)	23	0	(Turks and Caicos Islands Football Association) Academy Eagles
14	DF	Anios Jean	1 May 2008 (age 18)	2	0	(Turks and Caicos Islands Football Association) Academy Eagles
15	DF	Sean Clare	17 September 1996 (age 30)	4	1	(The Football Association) Leyton Orient
8	MF	Mackenson Cadet	20 January 2000 (age 26)	27	0	(Turks and Caicos Islands Football Association) SWA Sharks
16	MF	Ledson Jerome	28 December 1998 (age 27)	20	1	(Turks and Caicos Islands Football Association) SWA Sharks
17	MF	Mykerwens Varis	15 September 2008 (age 18)	3	0	(Turks and Caicos Islands Football Association) SWA Sharks
19	MF	Wepsdel Saintilus	13 March 2008 (age 18)	2	0	(Turks and Caicos Islands Football Association) Cheshire Hall
20	MF	John Robertson	23 March 2007 (age 19)	4	1	(The Football Association) Chesterfield
21	MF	Herwens Guerrier	11 February 2010 (age 16)	1	0	(Turks and Caicos Islands Football Association) Cheshire Hall
22	MF	Idelin Gardiner	7 December 2010 (age 15)	4	0	(Turks and Caicos Islands Football Association) SWA Sharks
23	MF	Callum Park	6 December 2004 (age 21)	17	0	(Turks and Caicos Islands Football Association) SWA Sharks
	MF	Jeff Beljour	4 April 1998 (age 28)	18	2	(Turks and Caicos Islands Football Association) SWA Sharks
7	FW	Billy Forbes	13 December 1990 (age 35)	42	23	(Turks and Caicos Islands Football Association) SWA Sharks
9	FW	Emmanuel Martin	26 May 2007 (age 19)	15	1	(The Football Association) Pickering Town
10	FW	Dominic Hutchinson	17 November 2001 (age 24)	4	1	(The Football Association) Worthing
11	FW	Junior Paul	14 June 2001 (age 25)	22	6	(Turks and Caicos Islands Football Association) SWA Sharks
12	FW	Schuyler Selver	20 February 2008 (age 18)	3	0	(United States Soccer Federation) Orlando City
	FW	Rosmith Messieur	3 June 2002 (age 24)	6	0	(Turks and Caicos Islands Football Association) Academy Eagles

== Player records ==
As of 15 October 2024
Players in bold are still active with Turks & Caicos Islands.

=== Most appearances ===
Rank	Name	Caps	Goals	Career
1	Billy Forbes	36	19	2008–2024
2	**Wildens Delva**	25	0	2014–present
2	Lenford Singh	25	1	2006–2022
4	**Mackenson Cadet**	24	0	2018–present
5	**Christopher Louisy**	20	0	2019–present
6	**Raymond Burey**	19	0	2021–present
6	**James Rene**	19	0	2011–present
8	**Junior Paul**	18	4	2022–present
9	**Jeff Beljour**	17	2	2018–present
9	**Widlin Calixte**	17	2	2015–present
9	Jose Elcius	17	1	2018–2022
9	**Callum Park**	17	0	2021–present

=== Top goalscorers ===
Rank	Name	Goals	Caps	Ratio	Career
1	Billy Forbes	19	36	0.53	2008–2024
2	Gavin Glinton	4	10	0.4	2004–2014
2	**Junior Paul**	4	18	0.22	2022–present
8	Christopher Bryan	2	6	0.33	1999–2006
8	Marco Fenelus	2	15	0.13	2011–2019
8	**Jeff Beljour**	2	17	0.12	2018–present
8	**Widlin Calixte**	2	17	0.12	2015–present

== Competitive record ==
=== FIFA World Cup ===
FIFA World Cup record									Qualification					
Year	Round	Position	Pld	W	D*	L	F	A	Pld	W	D	L	F	A
1930 to 1998	Not a FIFA member								Not a FIFA member					
(South Korea) (Japan) 2002	Did not qualify								2	0	0	2	0	14
(Germany) 2006	Did not qualify								2	0	0	2	0	7
(South Africa) 2010	Did not qualify								2	1	0	1	2	3
(Brazil) 2014	Did not qualify								2	0	0	2	0	10
(Russia) 2018	Did not qualify								2	0	0	2	4	12
(Qatar) 2022	Did not qualify								3	0	0	3	0	22
(Canada) (Mexico) (United States) 2026	Did not qualify								2	0	2	0	1	1
(Morocco) (Portugal) (Spain) 2030	To be determined								To be determined					
(Saudi Arabia) 2034	To be determined								To be determined					
Total		0/7							15	1	2	12	7	69

=== CONCACAF Gold Cup ===
CONCACAF Gold Cup record
Year	Round	Position	Pld	W	D*	L	GF	GA
1991 to 1998	Did not enter							
(United States) 2000	Did not qualify							
2002 and 2003	Did not enter							
(United States) 2005	Withdrew							
(United States) 2007	Did not qualify							
2009 to 2013	Did not enter							
2015 to 2027	Did not qualify							
Total	—	0/18	0	0	0	0	0	0

=== Caribbean Cup ===
Caribbean Cup record									Qualification record					
Year	Round	Position	Pld	W	D*	L	GF	GA	Pld	W	D*	L	GF	GA
1989 to 1997	Did not enter								Did not enter					
(Jamaica) (Trinidad and Tobago) 1998	Withdrew								Withdrew					
(Trinidad and Tobago) 1999	Did not qualify								2	0	1	1	2	5
(Trinidad and Tobago) 2001	Did not enter								Did not enter					
(Barbados) 2005	Withdrew								Withdrew					
(Trinidad and Tobago) 2007	Did not qualify								3	1	0	2	4	9
2008 to 2012	Did not enter								Did not enter					
(Jamaica) 2014	Did not qualify								2	1	0	2	2	7
(Martinique) 2017	Did not enter								Did not enter					
Total	—	0/19	0	0	0	0	0	0	7	2	1	4	8	21

=== CONCACAF Nations League ===
CONCACAF Nations League record
League phase											Final phase									
Season	League	Group	Pos	Pld	W	D	L	GF	GA	P/R	Finals	Round	Pos	Pld	W	D	L	GF	GA	Squad
2019–20	C	D	9th	4	2	0	2	8	17	Same position	(United States) 2021	Ineligible								
2022–23	C	A	6th	6	3	0	3	10	16	Same position	(United States) 2023	Ineligible								
2023–24	C	C	8th	4	0	1	3	3	10	Same position	(United States) 2024	Ineligible								
2024–25	C	B	7th	4	1	0	3	2	10	Same position	(United States) 2025	Ineligible								
2026–27	C	A	6th	4	2	0	2	7	6	Same position	2027 (Note: Since the 2026–27 CONCACAF Nations League, a final phase has been held for each league.)	Did not qualify								
Total				22	8	1	13	30	59	—	Total	—								

== Head-to-head record ==
Team	Pld	W	D	L	GF	GA	GD	WPCT
Anguilla	4	1	2	1	3	4	−1	25.00
Aruba	1	0	0	1	0	1	−1	0.00
Bahamas	9	2	0	7	9	30	−21	22.22
Barbados	2	0	0	2	0	7	−7	0.00
Belize	3	0	0	3	0	12	−12	0.00
Bonaire	2	1	0	1	3	5	−2	50.00
British Virgin Islands	6	3	2	1	13	7	+6	50.00
Cayman Islands	2	1	0	1	2	3	−1	50.00
Cuba	2	0	0	2	0	17	−17	0.00
Dominica	2	0	0	2	0	5	−5	0.00
Dominican Republic	1	0	0	1	0	4	−4	0.00
French Guiana	1	0	0	1	0	6	−6	0.00
Guadeloupe	2	0	0	2	0	13	−13	0.00
Guyana	1	0	0	1	0	8	−8	0.00
Haiti	3	0	0	3	0	17	−17	0.00
Marshall Islands	1	1	0	0	3	2	+1	100.00
Montserrat	1	0	0	1	0	2	−2	0.00
Nicaragua	1	0	0	1	0	7	−7	0.00
Saint Kitts and Nevis	4	0	0	4	4	26	−22	0.00
Saint Lucia	2	1	0	1	2	3	−1	50.00
Saint Vincent and the Grenadines	1	1	0	0	3	2	+1	100.00
Sint Maarten	4	3	0	1	12	12	0	75.00
U.S. Virgin Islands	4	1	1	2	6	6	0	25.00
Total	59	15	5	39	60	199	−139	25.42

Source: Results

== Historical kits ==
1999	1999	2004	2006	2008 Home	2008 Away	2011 Home	2014 Home

2014 Away	2015 Home	2015 Away	2018 Home	2018 Away	2019 Home	2019 Away	2022 Home

2022 Away	2024 Home	2024 Away
