= Academy Eagles FC =

Turks and Caicos football club

Academy Eagles
- Founded: 2018
- Ground: TCIFA National Academy
- Capacity: 3,000
- Chairman: Aaron Lawrence
- League: Provo Premier League
- 2025-26: Champions

Academy Eagles FC is a professional association football club from Turks and Caicos that currently competes in the Provo Premier League.

== History ==
Academy Eagles FC was founded in 2018 to initially serve as the junior team of the AFC Academy. The senior team was renamed the Academy Jaguars to distinguish between the two teams. That year, Eagles FC began play in the Provo Premier League, the top flight of football in the Turks and Caicos Islands.

The club represented the Turks and Caicos in the 2025 CFU Club Shield, being drawn into Group A.

== Domestic results ==
Key

Champion Runners-up 3rd Place

Season	League							Notes
Season	Div.	Pos.	Pl.	W	D	L	Pts.	Notes
2018	1st	6th	10	1	0	9	3	
2019	1st	6th	10	0	1	9	1	

== International competition ==
Results list Academy Eagles's goal tally first.

Competition	Round	Club	Score
2025 CFU Club Shield	Group Stage	(Haiti) Capoise	w/o
2025 CFU Club Shield	Group Stage	(United States Virgin Islands) Rovers	5–0
2025 CFU Club Shield	Semi-Finals	(Dominican Republic) Moca	0–0
2025 CFU Club Shield	Third-place	(Martinique) Club Franciscain	0–2

== Women's team ==
Academy Eagles FC also fields a team in the TCIFA Women's Premier League.
