= Double (association football) =

In football, winning the top division and cup competition in the same season

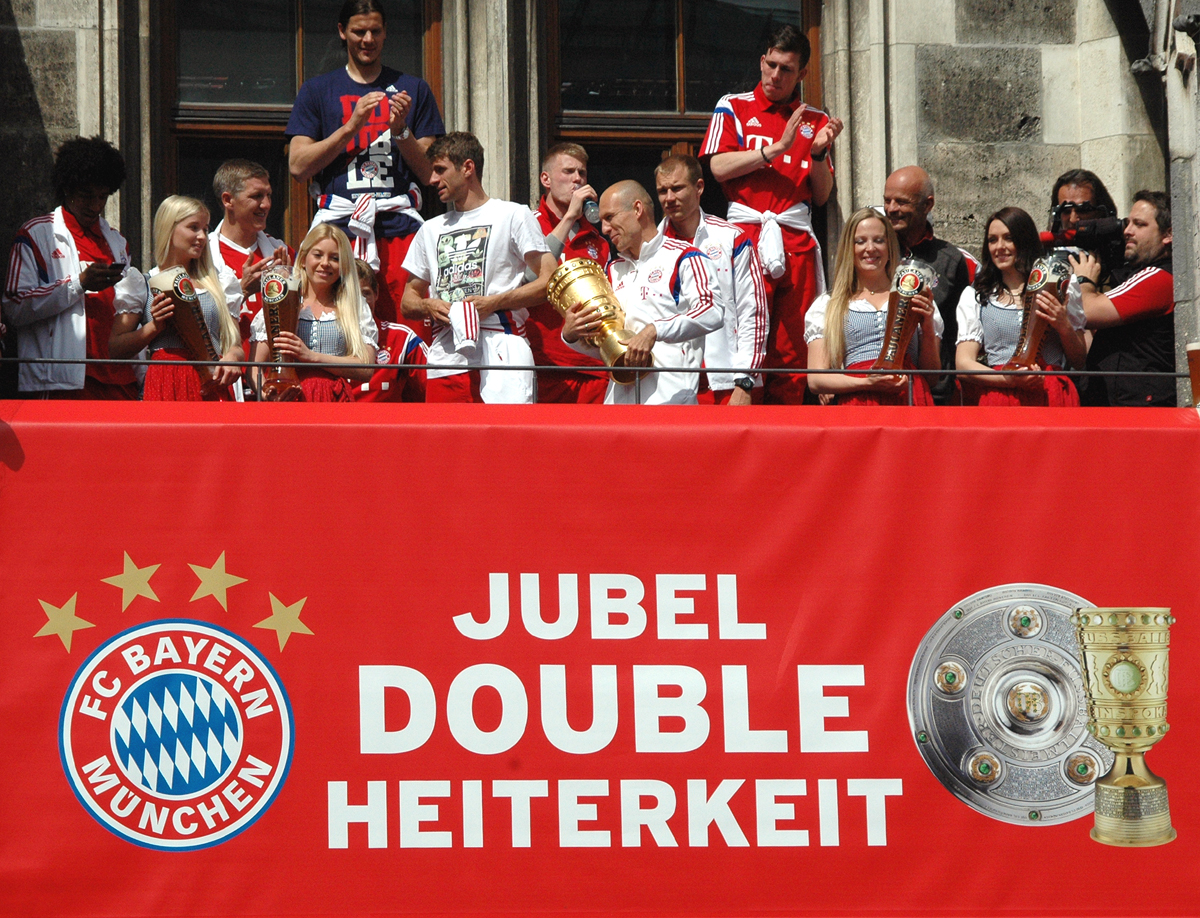
Bayern Munich's double-winning team of 2014

The Double, in association football, is the achievement of winning a country's top tier division and its primary domestic cup competition in the same season. The lists in this article examine this definition of a double, while derivative sections examine much less frequent, continental instances. The Double can also mean beating a team both home and away in the same league season, a feat often noted as doing the double over a particular opponent.

The first club to achieve a double was Preston North End in 1889, winning the FA Cup and The Football League in the inaugural season of the league.

The team that holds the record for the most doubles is Linfield of Northern Ireland, with a total of 25.

South Africa and Trinidad and Tobago are the two countries with the most Double-winning clubs, with 13 clubs each.

== Europe ==
=== Albania ===
In Albania, six teams have won the Double of the Kategoria Superiore and the Kupa e Shqipërisë.

Club	Number	Seasons
Partizani	7	1948, 1949, 1957, 1958, 1961, 1964, 1993
Dinamo Tirana	6	1950, 1951, 1952, 1953, 1960, 1990
Tirana	3	1939, 1996, 1999
Vllaznia Shkodër	1	1972
Skënderbeu	1	2017–18
Egnatia	1	2023–24

=== Andorra ===
In Andorra, four teams have won the Double of the Primera Divisió and the Copa Constitució.

Club	Number	Seasons
FC Santa Coloma	4	2000–01, 2002–03, 2003–04, 2017–18
Principat	3	1996–97, 1997–98, 1998–99
Inter Club d'Escaldes	2	2019–20, 2024–25
UE Santa Coloma	1	2023–24
Constel·lació Esportiva	1	1999–2000

=== Armenia ===
Prior to the breakup of the Soviet Union, Armenian clubs were part of Soviet competition. Ararat Yerevan was one of just two non-Russian clubs to win the Soviet double, in 1973, with Nikita Simonyan at the helm. They also won the post-independence Armenian Double in 1993.

In Armenia, four teams have won the Double of the Soviet Top League/Armenian Premier League and the Soviet Cup/Armenian Independence Cup.

Club	Soviet Union	Armenia	Total
Pyunik	-	2002, 2004, 2009, 2010, 2014–15	5
Ararat Yerevan	1973	1993	2
Urartu	-	2022–23	1
Noah	-	2024–25	1

=== Austria ===
In Austria, nine teams have won the Double of the Austrian Bundesliga and the Austrian Cup.

Club	Number	Seasons
Austria Wien	10	1923–24, 1925–26, 1948–49, 1961–62, 1962–63, 1979–80, 1985–86, 1991–92, 2002–03, 2005–06
Red Bull Salzburg	9	2011–12, 2013–14, 2014–15, 2015–16, 2016–17, 2018–19, 2019–20, 2020–21, 2021–22
Rapid Wien	6	1918–19, 1919–20, 1945–46, 1967–68, 1982–83, 1986–87
Admira Wacker	5	1927–28, 1931–32, 1933–34, 1946–47, 1965–66
Wacker Innsbruck	2	1972–73, 1974–75
Sturm Graz	2	1998–99, 2023–24
LASK	2	1964–65, 2025–26
Swarovski Tirol	1	1988–89
Grazer AK	1	2003–04

=== Azerbaijan ===
In Azerbaijan, five teams have won the Double of the Azerbaijan Premier League and the Azerbaijan Cup.

Club	Number	Seasons
Qarabağ	6	1993, 2014–15, 2015–16, 2016–17, 2021–22, 2023–24
Neftchi Baku	3	1995–96, 2003–04, 2012–13
Kapaz	1	1997–98
Khazar Lankaran	1	2006–07
Sabah	1	2025–26

=== Belarus ===
In Belarus, four teams have won the Double of the Belarusian Premier League and the Belarusian Cup.

Club	Number	Seasons
BATE Borisov	3	2006, 2010, 2015
Dinamo Minsk	2	1992, 1993–94
Slavia Mozyr	2	1996, 2000
Belshina	1	2001

=== Belgium ===
In Belgium, five teams have won the Double of the Belgian Pro League and the Belgian Cup.

Club	Number	Seasons
Anderlecht	3	1964–65, 1971–72, 1993–94
Club Brugge	2	1976–77, 1995–96
Cercle Brugge	1	1926–27
Union Saint-Gilloise	1	1912–13
Royal Antwerp	1	2022–23

=== Bosnia and Herzegovina ===
In Bosnia and Herzegovina, four teams have won the Double of the Bosnian First League/Premier League and the Bosnian Cup.

Club	Number	Seasons
Čelik Zenica	2	1994–95, 1995–96
Željezničar	2	2000–01, 2011–12
Sarajevo	1	2018–19
Zrinjski Mostar	1	2022–23

=== Bulgaria ===
In Bulgaria, four teams have won the Double of the Bulgarian A Football Group and the Bulgarian Cup.

Club	Number	Seasons
Levski Sofia	13	1942, 1946, 1947, 1949, 1950, 1969–70, 1976–77, 1978–79, 1983–84, 1993–94, 1999–2000, 2001–02, 2006–07
CSKA Sofia	11	1951, 1954, 1955, 1960–61, 1968–69, 1971–72, 1972–73, 1982–83, 1986–87, 1988–89, 1996–97
Ludogorets Razgrad	4	2011–12, 2013–14, 2022–23, 2024–25
Slavia Sofia	1	1995–96

=== Croatia ===
In Croatia, three teams have won the Double of the Yugoslav First League/Croatian First Football League and the Yugoslav Cup/Croatian Football Cup.

Club	Yugoslavia	Croatia	Total
Dinamo Zagreb	–	1995–96, 1996–97, 1997–98, 2006–07, 2007–08, 2008–09, 2010–11, 2011–12, 2014–15, 2015–16, 2017–18, 2020–21, 2023–24, 2025–26	14
Hajduk Split	1973–74	1994–95	2
Rijeka	–	2016–17, 2024–25	2

=== Cyprus ===
In Cyprus, five teams have won the Double of the Cypriot First Division and the Cypriot Cup.

Club	Number	Seasons
APOEL	6	1936–37, 1946–47, 1972–73, 1995–96, 2013–14, 2014–15
Omonia	5	1971–72, 1973–74, 1980–81, 1981–82, 1982–83
Anorthosis Famagusta	2	1961–62, 1997–98
AEK Larnaca	2	1944–45, 1945–46
Trust	1	1934–35

=== Czech Republic ===
Two teams won the Double of the Czechoslovak First League and Czechoslovak Cup. Since the dissolution of Czechoslovakia in 1993, the Double has consisted of the Czech First League and Czech Cup, being won by only two teams to date.

Club	Czechoslovakia	Czech Republic	Total
Sparta Prague	1983–84, 1987–88, 1988–89	2006–07, 2013–14, 2023–24	6
Dukla Prague	1960–61, 1965–66	-	2
Slavia Prague	-	2018–19, 2020–21	2

=== Denmark ===
In Denmark, five teams have won the Double of the Danish Superliga and the Danish Cup.

Club	Number	Seasons
Copenhagen	6	2003–04, 2008–09, 2015–16, 2016–17, 2022–23, 2024–25
AGF	3	1954–55, 1956–57, 1960
Brøndby	2	1997–98, 2004–05
Vejle	2	1958, 1972
Aalborg BK	1	2013–14

=== England ===
In England, eight teams have won the double of the Football League First Division (1888–1992)/Premier League (1992–present) and FA Cup.

Club	Number	Seasons
Manchester United	3	1993–94, 1995–96, 1998–99
Arsenal	3	1970–71, 1997–98, 2001–02
Manchester City	2	2018–19, 2022–23
Preston North End	1	1888–89
Aston Villa	1	1896–97
Tottenham Hotspur	1	1960–61
Liverpool	1	1985–86
Chelsea	1	2009–10

- Preston North End in 1889 won the double without losing a game all season and without conceding any goals in their cup winning campaign.
- Manchester United won the double three times in the 1990s, including as part of a continental treble in 1998–99.
- Manchester City won the double as part of the first-ever domestic treble for an English men's football team in 2018–19, and as part of a continental treble in 2022–23.

=== Estonia ===
In Estonia, two teams have won the Double of the Meistriliiga and the Estonian Cup.

Club	Number	Seasons
Levadia	7	1999, 2000, 2004, 2007, 2014, 2021, 2024
Flora	4	1994–95, 1997–98, 2011, 2020

=== Faroe Islands ===
In Faroe Islands, six teams have won the Double of the Faroe Islands Premier League and the Faroe Islands Cup.

Club	Number	Seasons
HB	13	1955, 1963, 1964, 1971, 1973, 1975, 1978, 1981, 1982, 1988, 1998, 2004, 2020
KÍ	4	1966, 1967, 1999, 2025
GÍ	2	1983, 1996
TB	1	1977
B36	1	2001
EB/Streymur	1	2008

=== Finland ===
In Finland, four teams have won the Double of the Veikkausliiga and the Finnish Cup.

Club	Number	Seasons
HJK	6	1981, 2003, 2011, 2014, 2017, 2020
Haka	2	1960, 1977
Tampere United	1	2007
KuPS	1	2024

=== France ===
In France, 12 teams have won the Double of the Ligue 1 and the Coupe de France.

Club	Number	Seasons
Paris Saint-Germain	6	2014–15, 2015–16, 2017–18, 2019–20, 2023–24, 2024–25
Saint-Étienne	4	1967–68, 1969–70, 1973–74, 1974–75
Marseille	2	1971–72, 1988–89
Lille	2	1945–46, 2010–11
Sète	1	1933–34
RC Paris	1	1935–36
Nice	1	1951–52
Reims	1	1957–58
Monaco	1	1962–63
Bordeaux	1	1986–87
Auxerre	1	1995–96
Lyon	1	2007–08

Note:

- Paris Saint-Germain's 2015, 2016, 2018, and 2020 doubles was part of the club's domestic treble, which also includes their Coupe de la Ligue victories.
- Paris Saint-Germain's 2025 double was part of the club's continental treble, which also includes their UEFA Champions League victory.

=== Georgia ===
In Georgia, two teams have won the Double of the Georgian Premier League and the Georgian Cup.

Club	Number	Seasons
Dinamo Tbilisi	10	1991–92, 1992–93, 1993–94, 1994–95, 1995–96, 1996–97, 2002–03, 2012–13, 2013–14, 2015–16
Torpedo Kutaisi	1	2000–01

=== Germany ===
==== Inter-war period ====
A national cup competition was introduced in Germany in 1935, and was known as the Tschammer-Pokal for the country's then minister of sport. Between 1935 and the suspension of cup play in 1944 because of World War II, the Double was won only once.

Club	Number	Seasons
Schalke 04	1	1937

==== Bundesliga era ====
Play for what had become the DFB-Pokal was resumed following the war in 1953, and up until well after the formation of the Bundesliga in 1963, no club was able to complete the double. A new cup trophy was introduced as it was felt the previous one was associated with the Nazi period.

In the modern-day Bundesliga era, the double has been won by only five clubs. Bayern Munich holds the record, with 14.

Club	Number	Seasons
Bayern Munich	14	1968–69, 1985–86, 1999–2000, 2002–03, 2004–05, 2005–06, 2007–08, 2009–10, 2012–13, 2013–14, 2015–16, 2018–19, 2019–20, 2025–26
1. FC Köln	1	1977–78
Werder Bremen	1	2003–04
Borussia Dortmund	1	2011–12
Bayer Leverkusen	1	2023–24

Note: Bayern Munich's 2013 and 2020 doubles were part of the club's trebles which also included their UEFA Champions League victories.

Note: Bayer Leverkusen achieved the domestic double unbeaten.

==== East Germany (defunct) ====
Following World War II, a separate football competition emerged in the Soviet-occupied eastern area of Germany. The first division DDR-Oberliga was active from 1947–48 to 1990–91 and saw the introduction of the FDGB-Pokal in 1949. The cup competition was not staged in the 1950–51 season and the transitional 1955 and 1961 seasons. Five doubles were won in East German competition:

Club	Number	Seasons
Dynamo Dresden	3	1971, 1977, 1990
BFC Dynamo	1	1988
Hansa Rostock	1	1991

Since the reunification of Germany, no former East German club has won either the Bundesliga title or the DFB Pokal (RB Leipzig having been founded in 2009); indeed, as of 2024, none of the aforementioned double winners are competing in the top flight.

=== Gibraltar ===
In Gibraltar, seven teams have won the Double of the Gibraltar Premier Division and the Rock Cup.

Club	Number	Seasons
Lincoln Red Imps	19	1985–86, 1989–90, 1992–93, 1993–94, 2003–04, 2004–05, 2005–06, 2006–07, 2007–08, 2008–09, 2009–10, 2010–11, 2013–14, 2014–15, 2015–16, 2020–21, 2021–22, 2023–24, 2025–26
Glacis United	3	1980–81, 1981–82, 1996–97
Europa	3	1937–38, 1951–52, 2016–17
Manchester United Gibraltar	2	1976–77, 1979–80
Britannia XI	1	1936–37
Gibraltar United	1	1946–47
St Joseph's	1	1995–96

=== Greece ===
In Greece, the big three of Attica and PAOK have managed to win the double of the Super League Greece and the Greek Football Cup.

Club	Number	Seasons
Olympiacos	19	1946–47, 1950–51, 1953–54, 1956–57, 1957–58, 1958–59, 1972–73, 1974–75, 1980–81, 1998–99, 2004–05, 2005–06, 2007–08, 2008–09, 2011–12, 2012–13, 2014–15, 2019–20, 2024–25
Panathinaikos	8	1968–69, 1976–77, 1983–84, 1985–86, 1990–91, 1994–95, 2003–04, 2009–10
AEK Athens	3	1938–39, 1977–78, 2022–23
PAOK	1	2018–19

=== Hungary ===
In Hungary, five teams have won the Double of the Nemzeti Bajnokság I and the Magyar Kupa.

Club	Number	Seasons
Ferencváros	8	1912–13, 1926–27, 1927–28, 1975–76, 1994–95, 2003–04, 2015–16, 2021–22
MTK Budapest	4	1913–14, 1922–23, 1924–25, 1996–97
Újpest	3	1969, 1970, 1974–75
Budapest Honvéd	2	1984–85, 1988–89
Debrecen	2	2009–10, 2011–12

=== Iceland ===
In Iceland, five teams have won the Double of the Úrvalsdeild karla and the Icelandic Cup.

Club	Number	Seasons
ÍA	4	1983, 1984, 1993, 1996
KR	4	1961, 1963, 1999, 2011
Víkingur Reykjavík	2	2021, 2023
Valur	1	1976
ÍBV	1	1998

=== Israel ===
In Israel, the Double can be achieved by winning the Top division championship and the Israel State Cup. The team that has won the most doubles to date is Maccabi Tel Aviv, with seven wins, followed by their city rivals, Hapoel Tel Aviv with four wins.

Club	Number	Seasons
Maccabi Tel Aviv	7	1946–47, 1953–54, 1957–58, 1969–70, 1976–77, 1995–96, 2014–15
Hapoel Tel Aviv	4	1933–34, 1937–38, 1999–2000, 2009–10
British Police	1	1931–32
Maccabi Netanya	1	1977–78
Maccabi Haifa	1	1990–91
Beitar Jerusalem	1	2007–08

=== Italy ===
Five Italian clubs share twelve doubles of the Serie A championship and the Coppa Italia.

Club	Number	Seasons
Juventus	6	1959–60, 1994–95, 2014–15, 2015–16, 2016–17, 2017–18
Internazionale	3	2005–06, 2009–10, 2025–26
Torino	1	1942–43
Napoli	1	1986–87
Lazio	1	1999–2000

Note: In 2006, Inter finished third in Serie A but were awarded the title as the highest placed club not to be involved in Calciopoli. The club's 2010 double was made the Treble with their UEFA Champions League victory.

=== Kazakhstan ===
In Kazakhstan, six teams have won the Double of the Kazakhstan Premier League and the Kazakhstan Cup.

Club	Number	Seasons
Kairat	1	1992
Spartak Semey	1	1995
Astana-1964	1	2001
Aktobe	1	2008
Astana	1	2016
Ordabasy	1	2026

=== Kosovo ===
In Kosovo, five teams have won the Double of the Superleague (1999–present) and the Kosovar Cup (1999–present).

Club	Number	Seasons
Feronikeli	2	2014–15, 2018–19
Besiana	1	2001–02
Besa Pejë	1	2004–05
Prishtina	1	2012–13
Ballkani	1	2023–24

=== Latvia ===
In Latvia, four teams have won the Double of the Latvian Higher League and the Latvian Football Cup.

Club	Number	Seasons
Skonto	7	1992, 1995, 1997, 1998, 2000, 2001, 2002
Ventspils	3	2007, 2011, 2013
RFS	2	2021, 2024
Riga	1	2018

=== Liechtenstein ===
There is no national league in Liechtenstein, as its clubs partake in the neighbouring Swiss football league system; the Liechtenstein Football Cup is the only national football competition in the country.

=== Lithuania ===
In Lithuania six teams have won the Double of the A Lyga and the Lithuanian Football Cup.

Club	Number	Seasons
Žalgiris	7	1991, 2013, 2014, 2015, 2016, 2021, 2022
FBK Kaunas	2	2002, 2004
Ekranas	2	2010, 2011
Sirijus	1	1990
Inkaras	1	1994–95
Sūduva	1	2019

Note: Žalgiris won domestic cup twice in 2016, due to format change.

=== Luxembourg ===
In Luxembourgish football, the Double is made up of the National Division title and the Luxembourg Cup. As there are no other senior football competitions in the country, and no club have never come close to winning any European tournament, the Double is the ultimate achievement for a Luxembourgish club in one season.

The most successful clubs are Jeunesse Esch and F91 Dudelange (one double 1947–48 as Stade Dudelange), who have completed eight Doubles each.

Club	Number	Seasons
Jeunesse Esch	8	1936–37, 1953–54, 1972–73, 1973–74, 1975–76, 1987–88, 1996–97, 1998–99
F91 Dudelange	8	1 as Stade Dudelange: 1947–48; 7 as F91 Dudelange: 2005–06, 2006–07, 2008–09, 2011–12, 2015–16, 2016–17, 2018–19
Differdange 03	4	3 as Red Boys Differdange: 1925–26, 1930–31, 1978–79; 1 as Differdange 03: 2024–25
Avenir Beggen	3	1983–84, 1992–93, 1993–94
Fola Esch	1	1923–24
Spora Luxembourg	1	1927–28
Progrès Niedercorn	1	1977–78
Union Luxembourg	1	1990–91
CS Grevenmacher	1	2002–03

=== Malta ===
In Malta, six teams have won the Double of the Maltese Premier League and the Maltese FA Trophy.

Club	Number	Seasons
Valletta	7	1959–60, 1977–78, 1996–97, 1998–99, 2000–01, 2013–14, 2017–18
Floriana	5	1949–50, 1952–53, 1954–55, 1957–58, 1992–93
Sliema Wanderers	5	1935–36, 1939–40, 1955–56, 1964–65, 2003–04
Ħamrun Spartans	3	1982–83, 1986–87, 1987–88
Hibernians	1	1981–82
Rabat Ajax	1	1985–86

=== Moldova ===
In Moldova, three teams have won the Double of the Moldovan Super Liga and Moldovan Cup.

Club	Number	Seasons
Sheriff Tiraspol	9	2000–01, 2001–02, 2005–06, 2007–08, 2008–09, 2009–10, 2016–17, 2021–22, 2022–23
Zimbru Chișinău	1	1997–98
Petrocub Hîncești	1	2023–24

=== Montenegro ===
In Montenegro, only two teams have won the Double of the Montenegrin First League and the Montenegrin Cup.

Club	Number	Seasons
Rudar Pljevlja	1	2009–10
Budućnost Podgorica	1	2020–21

=== Netherlands ===
In the Netherlands, six teams have won the Double of the Eredivisie and the KNVB Cup.

Club	Number	Seasons
Ajax	9	1966–67, 1969–70, 1971–72, 1978–79, 1982–83, 1997–98, 2001–02, 2018–19, 2020–21
PSV Eindhoven	4	1975–76, 1987–88, 1988–89, 2004–05
Feyenoord	3	1964–65, 1968–69, 1983–84
RAP Amsterdam	1	1898–99
HVV	1	1902–03
AZ	1	1980–81

Note: Ajax's 1972 Double were part of the club's Treble which also included their European Cup victory.

Note: PSV's 1988 Double were part of the club's Treble which also included their European Cup victory.

=== Northern Ireland ===
In Northern Ireland, seven teams have won the Double of the Irish League/Premier League/Premiership and the Irish Cup.

Club	Number	Seasons
Linfield	25	1890–91, 1891–92, 1892–93, 1894–95, 1897–98, 1901–02, 1903–04, 1921–22, 1922–23, 1929–30, 1933–34, 1949–50, 1961–62, 1977–78, 1979–80, 1981–82, 1993–94, 2005–06, 2006–07, 2007–08, 2009–10, 2010–11, 2011–12, 2016–17, 2020–21
Belfast Celtic	3	1925–26, 1936–37, 1937–38
Glentoran	3	1920–21, 1950–51, 1987–88
Distillery	2	1895–96, 1902–03
Queen's Island	1	1923–24
Glenavon	1	1956–57
Portadown	1	1990–91

=== North Macedonia ===
In North Macedonia, five teams have won the Double of the Macedonian First Football League and the Macedonian Football Cup.

Club	Number	Seasons
Vardar	2	1992–93, 1994–95
Rabotnički	2	2007–08, 2013–14
Sileks	1	1996–97
Sloga Jugomagnat	1	1999–2000
Shkëndija	1	2017–18

=== Norway ===
In Norway, seven teams have won the Double of the Eliteserien and the Norwegian Football Cup.

Club	Number	Seasons
Rosenborg	10	1971, 1988, 1990, 1992, 1995, 1999, 2003, 2015, 2016, 2018
Fredrikstad	3	1937–38, 1956–57, 1960–61
Lyn	1	1968
Strømsgodset	1	1970
Lillestrøm	1	1977
Viking	1	1979
Molde	1	2014

=== Poland ===
In Poland, five teams have won the Double of the Ekstraklasa and the Polish Cup.

Club	Number	Seasons
Legia Warsaw	7	1955, 1956, 1993–94, 1994–95, 2012–13, 2015–16, 2017–18
Górnik Zabrze	3	1964–65, 1970–71, 1971–72
Ruch Chorzów	1	1973–74
Lech Poznań	1	1983–84
Wisła Kraków	1	2002–03

=== Portugal ===
In Portugal, the Double is called "Dobradinha" and is achieved by winning the Primeira Liga and the Taça de Portugal. Only the "Big Three" have done so since the nationwide round-robin league competition was introduced in 1934.

Benfica holds the record of eleven Doubles. Sporting CP was the first side to achieve the Double, in 1941, as well as winning the most recent one, in 2025.

Club	Number	Seasons
Benfica	11	1942–43, 1954–55, 1956–57, 1963–64, 1968–69, 1971–72, 1980–81, 1982–83, 1986–87, 2013–14, 2016–17
Porto	9	1955–56, 1987–88, 1997–98, 2002–03, 2005–06, 2008–09, 2010–11, 2019–20, 2021–22
Sporting CP	7	1940–41, 1947–48, 1953–54, 1973–74, 1981–82, 2001–02, 2024–25

=== Republic of Ireland ===
In Ireland, the double is achieved by winning the League of Ireland and FAI Cup. Bohemians managed a similar feat in 1928 season by winning the League, FAI Cup, the League of Ireland Shield and the Leinster Senior Cup. Derry City FC completed 'The Treble' in 1988–89 by also winning the League of Ireland Cup.

Club	Number	Seasons
Shamrock Rovers	7	1924–25, 1931–32, 1963–64, 1984–85, 1985–86, 1986–87, 2025
Dundalk	4	1978–79, 1987–88, 2015, 2018
Bohemians	3	1927–28, 2000–01, 2008
St James's Gate	1	1921–22
Cork United	1	1940–41
Cork Athletic	1	1950–51
Derry City	1	1988–89
Shelbourne	1	1999–2000
Cork City	1	2017

=== Romania ===
In Romania, the Double is called the Event and can be achieved by winning the Liga I and the Cupa României. The team that has won the most doubles to date is Steaua București, with nine wins, followed by their city rivals, Dinamo București with six wins. In recent times, CFR Cluj has won the Double twice, being the fourth non-Bucharest team to do so, after Universitatea Craiova, UTA Arad and Ripensia Timişoara.

Club	Number	Seasons
Steaua București	9	1951, 1952, 1975–76, 1984–85, 1986–87, 1988–89, 1995–96, 1996–97, 2014–15
Dinamo București	6	1963–64, 1981–82, 1983–84, 1989–90, 1999–2000, 2003–04
Universitatea Craiova	3	1980–81, 1990–91, 2025–26
CFR Cluj	2	2007–08, 2009–10
UTA Arad	1	1947–48
Ripensia Timișoara	1	1935–36

Note: Steaua București initially won the double in 1987–88 but voluntarily gave up their Cupa României title.

=== Russia ===
Four Russian teams achieved the Double of the Soviet Top League and the USSR Cup in the former Soviet Union. The final Soviet championship was contested in 1991 and, following the break-up of the Soviet Union, newly independent states organised their own national competitions, with UEFA regarding the Russian Premier League and the Russian Cup as the respective successors to the old Soviet league and USSR Cup.

Club	Soviet Union	Russia	Total
Spartak Moscow	1938, 1939, 1958	1992, 1994, 1998	6
CSKA Moscow	1948, 1951, 1991	2005, 2006, 2012–13	6
Zenit Saint Petersburg	-	2010, 2019–20, 2023–24	3
Dynamo Moscow	1937	-	1
Torpedo Moscow	1960	-	1

=== San Marino ===
In San Marino seven teams have won the Double of the Campionato Sammarinese di Calcio and the Coppa Titano.

Club	Number	Seasons
Domagnano	2	2001–02, 2002–03
Murata	2	2006–07, 2007–08
Pennarossa	1	2003–04
Tre Fiori	1	2009–10
Folgore/Falciano	1	2014–15
La Fiorita	1	2017–18
Virtus	1	2024–25

=== Scotland ===
Three teams have accomplished the double of the Scottish league championship and the Scottish Cup. Only Aberdeen have managed to break the Old Firm trend, during their stint of success in the 1980s.

Club	Number	Seasons
Celtic	22	1906–07, (Note: also won Glasgow Cup.) 1907–08, 1913–14, 1953–54, 1966–67, (Note: also won Scottish League Cup.) 1968–69, 1970–71, 1971–72, 1973–74, 1976–77, 1987–88, 2000–01, 2003–04, 2006–07, 2012–13, 2016–17, 2017–18, 2018–19, 2019–20, 2022–23, 2023–24, 2025–26
Rangers	18	1927–28, 1929–30, 1933–34, 1934–35, 1948–49, 1949–50, 1952–53, 1962–63, 1963–64, 1975–76, 1977–78, 1991–92, 1992–93, 1995–96, 1998–99, 1999–2000, 2002–03, 2008–09
Aberdeen	1	1983–84 (Note: Also won the European Super Cup.)

Note: Celtic's 1967 Double was part of the club's Quintuple which also included their European Cup victory.

=== Serbia ===
Two teams in the current Republic of Serbia have won the Double of the Yugoslav First League and Yugoslav Cup (1923–92), the First League of FR Yugoslavia/Serbia and Montenegro and FR Yugoslavia/Serbia and Montenegro Cup (1992–2006), and the Serbian SuperLiga and Serbian Cup (2006–present).

Club	SFR Yugoslavia	FR Yugoslavia/Serbia and Montenegro	Serbia	Total
Red Star Belgrade	1958–59, 1963–64, 1967–68, 1969–70, 1989–90	1994–95, 1999–2000, 2003–04, 2005–06	2006–07, 2020–21, 2021–22, 2022–23, 2023–24, 2024–25, 2025–26	16
Partizan	1946–47	1993–94	2007–08, 2008–09, 2010–11, 2016–17	6

=== Slovakia ===
In Slovakia, seven teams have won the Double of the Czechoslovak First League/Slovak Super Liga and the Czechoslovak Cup/Slovak Cup.

Club	Czechoslovakia	Slovakia	Total
Slovan Bratislava	1955, 1973–74	1993–94, 1998–99, 2010–11, 2012–13, 2019–20, 2020–21	8
Inter Bratislava	-	1999–2000, 2000–01	2
Trenčín	-	2014–15, 2015–16	2
Spartak Trnava	1970–71	-	1
Ružomberok	-	2005–06	1
Petržalka	-	2007–08	1
Žilina	-	2011–12	1

=== Slovenia ===
In Slovenia, three teams have won the Double of the Slovenian PrvaLiga and the Slovenian Football Cup.

Club	Number	Seasons
Maribor	4	1996–97, 1998–99, 2011–12, 2012–13
Olimpija Ljubljana (2005)	2	2017–18, 2022–23
Olimpija Ljubljana (1945)	1	1992–93

=== Spain ===
In Spain, four teams have won the Double (Doblete) of La Liga and the Copa del Rey.

Club	Number	Seasons
Barcelona	9	1951–52, 1952–53, 1958–59, 1997–98, 2008–09, 2014–15, 2015–16, 2017–18, 2024–25
Athletic Bilbao	5	1929–30, 1930–31, 1942–43, 1955–56, 1983–84
Real Madrid	4	1961–62, 1974–75, 1979–80, 1988–89
Atlético Madrid	1	1995–96

Note: Barcelona's 2009 and 2015 Doubles were part of the club's Trebles which also included their UEFA Champions League victories.

=== Sweden ===
In Sweden, six teams have won the Double of the Swedish championship and the Svenska Cupen.

The Svenska Cupen was not introduced until the 1941 season, while Allsvenskan started for the 1923–24 season. Svenska Cupen was also not played between 1954 and 1966. It should also be considered that winning Allsvenskan did not grant the title of Swedish champions until 1931 and between 1982 and 1992 when the title was given to the winner of other cup tournaments that were organized at the end of the league season. The number of doubles for IFK Göteborg and Malmö FF are affected by this. IFK Göteborg won the Swedish Championship together with Svenska Cupen in one additional season to the table below, they won the two titles in 1983, a year when they did not win Allsvenskan. Additionally while Malmö won Allsvenskan in 1989, they were not Swedish Championships for that season as they did not win the play-off following the ordinary league play. All other teams in the table below won the Swedish Championship in their double-winning seasons. The latest club to win a double is Malmö FF who completed the feat in 2024. In 1982, IFK Göteborg also managed to combine its double with winning the UEFA Cup.

Club	Number	Seasons
Malmö FF	8	1943–44, 1950–51, 1952–53, 1967, 1974, 1975, 1986, 2024
IFK Göteborg	3	1982, 1983, 1991
IFK Norrköping	2	1942–43, 1944–45
Djurgårdens IF	2	2002, 2005
Helsingborgs IF	2	1941, 2011
AIK	1	2009

=== Switzerland ===
In Switzerland, eight teams have won the Double of the Swiss Super League and the Swiss Cup.

Club	Number	Seasons
Grasshopper	8	1926–27, 1936–37, 1941–42, 1942–43, 1951–52, 1955–56, 1982–83, 1989–90
Basel	7	1966–67, 2001–02, 2007–08, 2009–10, 2011–12, 2016–17, 2024–25
Young Boys	3	1957–58, 2019–20, 2022–23
Lausanne-Sport	2	1934–35, 1943–44
La Chaux-de-Fonds	2	1953–54, 1954–55
Zürich	2	1965–66, 1975–76
Servette	1	1978–79
Sion	1	1996–97

=== Turkey ===
In Turkey, four teams have won the Double of the Süper Lig and the Turkish Cup.

Club	Number	Seasons
Galatasaray	8	1962–63, 1972–73, 1992–93, 1998–99, 1999–2000, 2014–15, 2018–19, 2024–25
Fenerbahçe	3	1967–68, 1973–74, 1982–83
Beşiktaş	3	1989–90, 2008–09, 2020–21
Trabzonspor	2	1976–77, 1983–84

Note: Galatasaray's 2000 Double was part of the club's Minor treble which also included their UEFA Cup victory.

=== Ukraine ===
Prior to the breakup of the Soviet Union, Ukrainian clubs were part of Soviet competition. Since 1992, the country has had its own domestic competition. Dynamo Kyiv has four Soviet and nine Ukrainian Doubles among its honours.

In Ukraine, two teams have won the Double of the Soviet Top League/Ukrainian Premier League and the Soviet Cup/Ukrainian Cup.

Club	Soviet Union	Ukraine	Total
Dynamo Kyiv	1966, 1974, 1985, 1990	1992–93, 1995–96, 1997–98, 1998–99, 1999–2000, 2002–03, 2006–07, 2014–15, 2020–21	13
Shakhtar Donetsk	–	2001–02, 2007–08, 2010–11, 2011–12, 2012–13, 2016–17, 2017–18, 2018–19, 2023–24	9

=== Wales ===
In Wales, seven teams have won the Double of the Division One (1904–92) / Welsh Premier League (1992–present) and the Welsh Cup. Achieving this and also winning the Welsh League Cup would make a domestic Treble. To date, two clubs have achieved the Treble. Rhyl achieved a domestic quadruple in 2003–04, winning the Welsh Premier, Welsh Cup, Welsh Premier League Cup and North Wales Challenge Cup. They narrowly missed out on a clean sweep of five trophies losing the Welsh Premier Cup Final to Wrexham.

Club	Number	Seasons
The New Saints	9	2003–04, 2011–12, 2013–14, 2014–15, 2015–16, 2018–19, 2021–22, 2022–23, 2024–25
Cardiff City	4	1922–23, 1966–67, 1967–68, 1969–70
Barry Town	4	1996–97, 2000–01, 2001–02, 2002–03
Swansea City	1	1912–13
Lovell's Athletic	1	1947–48
Newport County	1	1979–80
Rhyl	1	2003–04

- Rhyl's 2003–04 double was part of a domestic treble of Welsh Premier League, Welsh Cup and Welsh Premier League Cup

== South America ==
=== Argentina ===
Boca Juniors are the only club to simultaneously win the Argentine Primera División and the Copa Argentina.

Club	Number	Seasons
Boca Juniors	4	1969, 2012, 2015, 2020

=== Bolivia ===
Club Bolívar are the only club to complete the double having won both the Liga de Fútbol Profesional Boliviano and Copa Aerosur (defunct) in 2009.

=== Brazil ===
Due to the large size of the country and the late development of the transportation and communication infrastructure needed to support it, a nationwide competition did not emerge until 1959. For 30 years, a domestic double was not possible since there existed only one national tournament. An exception was the 1967 season, when Palmeiras won the double consisting of the inaugural Torneio Roberto Gomes Pedrosa and the final edition of the Taça Brasil.

Since the founding of the Copa do Brasil in 1989, there has been two teams that won both the Copa do Brasil and the Campeonato Brasileiro Série A.

Club	Number	Seasons
Cruzeiro	1	2003
Atlético-MG	1	2021

=== Chile ===
In Chile, two teams have won the Double of the Chilean Primera División and Copa Chile.

Club	Number	Seasons
Colo-Colo	4	1981, 1989, 1990, 1996
Universidad de Chile	1	2000

=== Colombia ===
In Colombia, two teams have won the Double of the Categoría Primera A and Copa Colombia.

Club	Number	Seasons
Millonarios	2	1953, 1963* (not official)
Nacional	2	2013, 2024

=== Ecuador ===
In Ecuador, no team has won the double of the Ecuadorian Serie A and the Copa Ecuador.

=== Paraguay ===
Club Libertad are the only club to complete the double having won both the Paraguayan Primera Division and Copa Paraguay in 2023 and 2024.

=== Peru ===
In Peru, there is no national cup; the Peruvian Primera División is the only national football competition in the country.

=== Uruguay ===
In Uruguay, three teams have won the Double of the Uruguayan Primera División and the Copa de Competencia (defunct).

Club	Number	Seasons
Nacional	5	1903, 1912, 1915, 1919, 1923
CURCC	3	1901, 1905, 1907
Montevideo Wanderers	1	1906

=== Venezuela ===
In Venezuela, eight teams have won the Double of the Venezuelan Primera División and the Copa Venezuela.

Club	Number	Seasons
Portuguesa	3	1973, 1976, 1977
Caracas	2	1994, 2009
Deportivo Petare	1	1961
Unión Deportiva Canarias	1	1968
Deportivo Galicia	1	1969
Estudiantes de Mérida	1	1985
Marítimo de Venezuela	1	1988
Universidad Central	1	2025

== CONCACAF ==
=== Anguilla ===
In Anguilla, three teams have won the Double of the Anguillan League and the AFA President's Cup.

Club	Number	Seasons
Attackers	4	2007-08, 2008-09, 2012-13, 2026
Kicks United	3	2010-11, 2014-15, 2017-18
Roaring Lions	1	2009-10

=== Antigua and Barbuda ===
In Antigua and Barbuda, two teams have won the Double of the Premier Division and the FA Cup.

Club	Number	Seasons
Bassa	2	2007–08, 2009–10
SAP	1	2008–09

=== Aruba ===
In Aruba, two teams have won the Double of the Division di Honor and the Torneo Copa Betico Croes.

Club	Number	Seasons
Britannia	2	2008–09, 2009–10
Racing Aruba	2	2011–12, 2015–16

=== Bahamas ===
In the Bahamas, two teams have won the Double of the Senior League and the President's Cup.

Club	Number	Seasons
Bears	2	2008–09, 2009–10
Cavalier	1	1999

=== Barbados ===
In Barbados, seven teams have won the Double of the Barbados Premier Division and the Barbados FA Cup.

Club	Number	Seasons
Weymouth Wales	8	1967, 1969, 1970, 1972, 1975, 1984, 2017, 2023
Notre Dame	4	1997, 2004, 2008, 2010
Paradise	2	1996, 2003
Spartan	1	1950
Everton Barbados	1	1960
Pride of Gall Hill	1	1993
BDF	1	2015

=== Belize ===
In Belize, there is no national cup, the Premier League is the only national football competition in the country.

=== Bermuda ===
In Bermuda, nine teams have won the Double of the Bermudian Premier Division and the Bermuda FA Cup.

Club	Number	Seasons
North Village Rams	5	1977–78, 2001–02, 2002–03, 2005–06, 2024-25
Somerset Trojans	3	1967–68, 1968–69, 1969–70
Dandy Town Hornets	3	2011–12, 2013–14, 2021–22
PHC Zebras	3	1970–71, 1991-92, 2007–08
Young Men's Social Club	2	1963–64, 1964–65
Boulevard Blazers	1	1990-91
Devonshire Cougars	1	2012-13
Devonshire Colts	1	1972–73
Vasco da Gama	1	1997–98

=== Bonaire ===
In Bonaire, only one team has won the Double of the Bonaire League and the Kopa MCB.

Club	Number	Seasons
Real Rincon	1	2014, 2019

=== British Virgin Islands ===
In the British Virgin Islands, only one team has won the Double of the BVIFA National Football League and the British Virgin Islands FA Cup.

Club	Number	Seasons
Virgin Gorda United	1	2024-25

=== Canada ===
Top-level Canadian clubs either compete in the domestic Canadian Premier League (CPL), or Major League Soccer (MLS) of the United States. The Canadian Championship is the country's national cup and is contested between CPL teams, the three Canadian MLS teams, and the champions of the regional pro-am leagues.

Teams can win the Double by winning both a league championship (CPL Finals or MLS Cup) and the Canadian Championship. Teams can also win a league Double, which is achieved by winning both the regular season shield (CPL Shield or Supporters' Shield) and the league championship.

The only Canadian MLS team to have won a double was Toronto FC in 2017, which was also part of a domestic treble. Cavalry FC is the only CPL team to win a league double in 2026.

During the original Canadian Soccer League from 1987 to 1992, there was no formal recognition for the team with the most points at the end of the regular season. However, the Vancouver 86ers had the best regular season record and won the league championship in 1988, 1989, 1990, and 1991.

Domestic double
Club	Number	Seasons
Toronto FC	1	2017 (MLS Cup, Canadian Championship)

League double
Club	Number	Seasons
Toronto FC	1	2017 (Supporters' Shield, MLS Cup)
Cavalry FC	1	2026 (CPL Shield, North Star Cup)

=== Cayman Islands ===
Six teams from the Cayman Islands have won the double of the Cayman Islands League and the Cayman Islands FA Cup.

Club	Number	Seasons
Scholars International	5	2002–03, 2005–06, 2007–08, 2011–12, 2021–22
Bodden Town	2	2012–13, 2016–17
George Town	1	2001–02
Latinos	1	2003–04
Western Union	1	2004–05
Saprissa	1	1972-73

=== Costa Rica ===
In Costa Rica, only one team has won the Double of the Costa Rican Primera División and the Costa Rican Cup.

Club	Number	Seasons
Cartaginés	1	2022

=== Cuba ===
In Cuba, there is no national cup; the Campeonato Nacional is the only national football competition in the country.

=== Curaçao ===
In Curaçao, there is no national cup, the Curaçao League is the only national football competition in the country.

=== Dominica ===
In Dominica, three teams have won the Double of the Dominica Premier League and the Dominica Knock-Out Tournament (hiatus from 2006–2023 before the President's Cup/Champions Cup).

Club	Number	Seasons
Harlem United	8	1970, 1973, 1974, 1992, 1994, 1997, 2003, 2004
Dublanc	2	2024, 2025
Kensborough United	1	1977

=== Dominican Republic ===
In the Dominican Republic, there is no national cup; the Primera División is the only national football competition in the country.

=== El Salvador ===
In El Salvador, two teams have won the Double of the Primera División and the Copa El Salvador.

Club	Number	Seasons
Santa Tecla	2	2017, 2019
Águila	1	2000

=== French Guiana ===
In French Guiana, five teams have won the Double of the French Guiana Championnat National and the Coupe de Guyane.

Club	Number	Seasons
Saint-Georges	4	1964–65, 1982–83, 1983–84, 1999–2000
Matoury	3	2010–11, 2011–12, 2015–16
Le Geldar	2	2008–09, 2009–10
Club Colonial	1	1977–78
Étoile Matoury	1	2023–24

=== Grenada ===
In Grenada, is no national cup, the Grenada League is the only national football competition in the country.

=== Guadeloupe ===
In Guadeloupe, eight teams have won the Double of the Guadeloupe Division d'Honneur and the Coupe de Guadeloupe.

Club	Number	Seasons
Moulien	3	1948, 2013, 2014
CS Capesterrien	2	1957, 1962
Juventus de Sainte-Anne	2	1975, 1976
Solidarité Scolaire	2	1992, 1993
Zénith Morne-à-l'Eau	1	1989
Cygne Noir	1	1983
L'Étoile de Morne-à-l'Eau	1	2002
Racing de Basse-Terre	1	2004

=== Guatemala ===
In Guatemala, three teams have won the Double of the Liga Nacional de Fútbol de Guatemala and the Copa de Guatemala (defunct).

Club	Number	Seasons
Aurora	2	1968, 1984
Comunicaciones	2	1972, 1986
Municipal	2	2003, 2004

=== Guyana ===
In Guyana, only one team has won the Double of the National Super League and the Guyana Mayors Cup.

Club	Number	Seasons
Alpha United	1	2013

=== Haiti ===
In Haiti, five teams have won the Double of the Ligue Haïtienne and the Coupe d'Haïti.

Club	Number	Seasons
Violette	1	1939
Racing	1	1941
Excelsour	1	1950
Baltimore	1	2006
América	1	2014

=== Honduras ===
Club Deportivo Olimpia are the only club to complete the double having won both the Liga Nacional and Honduran Cup in 2015 respectively.

=== Jamaica ===
In Jamaica, three teams have won the Double of the National Premier League and the Champions Cup.

Club	Number	Seasons
Portmore United	2	2002–03, 2004–05
Tivoli Gardens	2	1998–99, 2010–11
Reno	1	1994–95

=== Martinique ===
In Martinique, four teams have won the Double of the Martinique Championnat National and the Coupe de la Martinique.

Club	Number	Seasons
Club Franciscain	9	1998-99, 2000–01, 2001–02, 2002–03, 2003–04, 2004–05, 2006–07, 2017-18, 2023–24
Aussaut de St Pierre	3	1966, 1967, 1968
Golden Star	2	1953, 1958
Golden Lion	1	2015–16

=== Mexico ===
In Mexico, nine teams have won the Double of the Primera Fuerza / Liga MX and the Copa MX. The Copa MX was last contested in 2020.

Club	Amateur Era	Professional Era	Total
Real España	1914–15, 1916–17, 1918–19	–	3
Reforma	1908–09, 1909–10	–	2
Asturias	1922–23, 1938–39	–	2
Necaxa	1932–33	1994–95	2
Cruz Azul	–	1968–69, 1996–97	2
Guadalajara	–	1969–70, 2017 (A)	2
León	–	1948–49	1
Puebla	–	1989–90	1
Monterrey	–	2019–20	1

=== Montserrat ===
In Montserrat, no team has won the Double of the Montserrat Championship and the Montserrat Cup.

=== Nicaragua ===
In Nicaragua, two teams have won the Double of the Nicaraguan Primera División and the Copa de Nicaragua (defunct).

Club	Number	Seasons
Diriangén	2	1996, 1997
Real Estelí	1	1991

=== Panama ===
In Panama, no team has won the Double of the Liga Panameña and the Copa Panamá.

=== Puerto Rico ===
In Puerto Rico only one team has won the Double of the Liga Nacional and the Torneo de Copa (defunct).

Club	Number	Seasons
Fraigcomar	1	2006

=== Saint Kitts and Nevis ===
In Saint Kitts and Nevis, six teams have won the Double of the Saint Kitts Premier Division and the Saint Kitts and Nevis National Cup.

Club	Number	Seasons
Newtown United	2	2006–07, 2009–10
Village Superstars	2	2002–03, 2010–11
St. Paul's United	2	2019–20, 2021–22
Cayon Rockets	1	2001–02
Conaree United	1	2012–13
Manchester United	1	1965

And no team has won the Double of the Nevis Premier Division and the Saint Kitts and Nevis National Cup.

=== Saint Lucia ===
In Saint Lucia, two teams have won the Double of the Saint Lucia Gold Division and the Saint Lucia FA Cup.

Club	Number	Seasons
VSADC	2	2001, 2002
Roots Alley Ballers	1	1999

=== Saint Vincent and the Grenadines ===
In Saint Vincent and the Grenadines, is no national cup; the NLA Premier League is the only national football competition in the country.

=== Sint Maarten ===
In Sint Maarten, there is no national cup; the Sint Maarten League is the only national football competition in the country.

=== Suriname ===
In Suriname, four teams have won the Double of the Topklasse and the Surinamese Cup. In 2024 the Suriname Major League replaced the Topklasse as the professional football league competition.

Club	Topklasse	Suriname Major League	Total
Robinhood	2017-18	2024	2
Inter Moengotapoe	2016–17, 2018–19	-	2
Transvaal	1995–96	-	1
WBC	2008–09	-	1

=== Trinidad and Tobago ===
In Trinidad and Tobago, 13 teams have won the Double of the Port of Spain Football League / National League / Semi-Professional League / TT Pro League and the Trinidad and Tobago Cup.

Club	Number	Seasons
Defence Force Chaguaramas	5	1974, 1981, 1985, 1989, 1996
Everton Port of Spain	3	1930, 1931, 1932
Maple Club	2	1953, 1963
Sports Club	2	1982, 1983
United Petrotrin	2	1986, 1988
W Connection	2	2000, 2013–14
Casuals Port of Spain	1	1934
Colts	1	1945
Shamrock	1	1959
Paragon	1	1964
Regiment	1	1966
Police Trinidad and Tobago	1	1994
Joe Public	1	2009

=== Turks and Caicos Islands ===
In the Turks and Caicos Islands, five teams have won the Double of the Provo Premier League and the Turks and Caicos FA Cup.

Club	Number	Seasons
AFC Academy	2	2016, 2019
Masters	1	2000
Caribbean All Stars	1	2003
Cheshire Hall	1	2012
SWA Sharks	1	2025

=== United States ===
==== Men ====
In the United States, the double consists of the MLS Cup (Major League Soccer's league championship) and or the U.S. Open Cup or Canadian Championship for United States and Canadian clubs, respectively. Teams that win both the Supporters' Shield and the MLS Cup are also considered to have won the league double. No team based in the United States has achieved the domestic treble of both MLS honours and a domestic cup in the same season although Toronto FC, who play in MLS but are based in Canada, won a domestic treble in 2017.

The following is a list of doubles in the United States in the MLS era:

Domestic doubles (MLS Cup and U.S. Open Cup)
Club	Number	Seasons
D.C. United	1	1996
LA Galaxy	1	2005
Chicago Fire	1	1998

League doubles (Supporters' Shield and MLS Cup)
Club	Number	Seasons
D.C. United	2	1997, 1999
LA Galaxy	2	2002, 2011
Kansas City Wizards	1	2000
Columbus Crew	1	2008
Los Angeles FC	1	2022

==== Women ====
As of 2028, a National Cup in the United States will be inaugurated, the Arthur M. Blank Crest Cup. The double will include the league championship for the team's respective league and the Blank Cup.

In the pre-Blank Cup era, the only way to achieve the double in the United States is through a league double (winning the Shield or its equivalent for the best regular-season record, and the league championship).

The Women's United Soccer Association did not have formal recognition of the team with the best regular season record, but during the 2002 WUSA season, the Carolina Courage had the best regular season record and won the Founders Cup, the WUSA Championship Trophy.

Women's Professional Soccer, which operated from 2009 to 2011, had one club win both the regular season championship and the WPS Championship (the latter through the playoffs): During the 2011 Women's Professional Soccer season, the Western New York Flash had the best regular season record, and won in the Championship match on 27 August 2011 to win the WPS Championship and the double.

The National Women's Soccer League did not see a double in its first five seasons (2013–2017). However, in both its 2018 and 2019 seasons, the North Carolina Courage won both the NWSL Shield (awarded to the team with the best regular-season record) and the NWSL Championship (earned by winning in the NWSL Playoffs).

League doubles (NWSL Shield and NWSL Championship)
Club	Number	Seasons
North Carolina Courage	2	2018, 2019
Orlando Pride	1	2024

=== United States Virgin Islands ===
In the United States Virgin Islands, there is no national cup; the U.S. Virgin Islands Championship is the only national football competition in the country.

== Oceania ==
=== Australia ===
From 1977 to 1997, the double could be achieved in Australia by winning the National Soccer League and the NSL Cup.

Between 1997 and 2014, Australia had no national cup competition so the traditional league and cup double could not be achieved. Since the formation of the A-League in 2004, a double could be accomplished by winning the Premiership in the regular league season and the Championship in the finals series. The feat of winning the minor premiership and the finals during the NSL era was not officially recognised as a 'double'.

From 2014–15, the FFA Cup takes place on an annual basis.

==== 1977–2004 ====
National Soccer League and NSL Cup
Club	# Wins	Seasons
Adelaide City	1	1991–92
Melbourne Knights	1	1994–95

==== 2005–present ====
A-League Championship and A-League Premiership
Club	# Wins	Seasons
Melbourne Victory	3	2006–07, 2008–09, 2014–15
Sydney FC	3	2009–10, 2016–17, 2019–20
Brisbane Roar	2	2010–11, 2013–14
Adelaide United	1	2015–16
Melbourne City	1	2020–21
Central Coast Mariners	1	2023–24
Newcastle Jets	1	2025–26

=== American Samoa ===
In American Samoa, two teams have won the Double of the FFAS Senior League and the FFAS President's Cup (defunct).

Club	Number	Seasons
FC SKBC	1	2013
Utulei Youth	1	2014

=== Cook Islands ===
In Cook Islands, five teams have won the Double of the Cook Islands Round Cup and the Cook Islands Cup.

Club	Number	Seasons
Tupapa Maraerenga	7	2001, 2015, 2018, 2019, 2023, 2024, 2025
Titikaveka	3	1950, 1979, 1984
Avatiu	3	1994, 1996, 1997
Nikao Sokattack	3	2005, 2008, 2021
Puaikura	2	1985, 2016

=== Fiji ===
In Fiji, four teams have won the Double of the League Championship (for Districts) and the FFA Cup.

Club	Number	Seasons
Ba	5	2004, 2005, 2006, 2010, 2026
Nadroga	1	1993
Suva	1	2020
Lautoka	1	2023

=== New Caledonia ===
In New Caledonia, six teams have won the Double of the New Caledonia Super Ligue and the New Caledonia Cup.

Club	Number	Seasons
Magenta	6	2002–03, 2003–04, 2004–05, 2014, 2016, 2018
Indépendante	1	1954
PLGC	1	1958
Baco	1	1995
Mont-Dore	1	2005–06
Hienghène Sport	1	2019

=== New Zealand ===
Between 1970 and 2003, five New Zealand teams have won the double of the national championship (New Zealand National Soccer League (1970–92 and 2000–04), Superclub competition (1993–95), National Summer Soccer League (1996–98) or the New Zealand island soccer leagues National Final (1999)) and the Chatham Cup. From 1993 to 2003, the league champions were determined by a knockout tournament between the top-finishing teams at the end of the season, the team that finished in first place during the league phase of the season were not officially awarded a title.

From 2003, the league system in the country was drastically restructured and saw the National Soccer League disband, with its teams now competing on a regional basis. The New Zealand Football Championship was formed and became the country's national league, exclusively run for franchised teams as opposed to the traditional clubs that competed in the National Soccer League.

As with most franchise leagues, the Football Championship was split into two phases; the Premiership during the regular season and the Championship during the finals phase, which was contested between the top four-placed teams of the Premiership phase. The franchises were ineligible to participate in the Chatham Cup. From 2021 onwards this system was replaced by the New Zealand National League, with the Chatham Cup as its primary cup, and the franchises were disbanded.

==== 1970–2003 ====
Club	Number	Seasons
University-Mount Wellington	2	1980, 1982
Christchurch United	2	1975, 1991
Waitakere City	2	1995, 1996
Napier City Rovers	2	1993, 2000
Bay Olympic	1	1970

==== 2004–2021 ====
Club	Number	Seasons
Auckland City	5	2004–05, 2005–06, 2013–14, 2014–15, 2017–18
Waitakere United	3	2007–08, 2010–11, 2012–13

==== 2021–present ====
Club	Number	Seasons
Auckland City	1	2022

=== Palau ===
In Palau, there is no national cup; the Palau Soccer League is the only national football competition in the country.

=== Papua New Guinea ===
In Papua New Guinea, there is no national cup; the Papua New Guinea Overall Championship is the only national football competition in the country.

=== Samoa ===
In Samoa, two teams have won the Double of the Samoa National League and the Samoa Cup.

Club	Number	Seasons
Lupe ole Soaga	1	2012–13
Kiwi	1	2013–14

=== Solomon Islands ===
In Solomon Islands, there is no national cup; the Telekom S-League is the only national football competition in the country.

=== Tahiti ===
In Tahiti, nine teams have won the Double of the Tahiti First Division and the Tahiti Cup.

Club	Number	Seasons
Central Sport	11	1962, 1966, 1967, 1972, 1973, 1975, 1976, 1977, 1979, 1981, 1983
Vénus	5	1990, 1992, 1998, 1999, 2019
Tefana	3	2010, 2011, 2026
Fei Pi	2	1948, 1949
Excelsior	1	1960
Tamarii Punaruu	1	1969
Jeunes Tahitiens	1	1987
Pirae	1	1994
Manu-Ura	1	2009

=== Tonga ===
In Tonga, only two teams have won the Double of the Tonga Major League and the Tonga Cup.

Club	Number	Seasons
Ngeleʻia	3	1982, 1983, 1985
Nukuhetulu	1	2025

== Asia ==
=== Afghanistan ===
In Afghanistan, there are no national cups. The Afghan Premier League is the only national football competition in the country since 2012.

=== Bahrain ===
In Bahrain three teams have won the Double of the Bahraini Premier League and the Bahraini King's Cup.

Club	Number	Seasons
Al-Muharraq	15	1957–58, 1960–61, 1961–62, 1962–63, 1963–64, 1965–66, 1966–67, 1973–74, 1982–83, 1983–84, 1994–95, 2002, 2007–08, 2008–09, 2010–11
Riffa	3	1997–98, 2018–19, 2020–21
Al-Ahli Manama	1	1976–77

=== Bangladesh ===
In Bangladesh six teams have won the Double of the Dhaka First Division League / Dhaka Premier League / Bangladesh Premier League and the Federation Cup.

Club	Number	Seasons
Mohammedan Dhaka	4	1980, 1982, 1987, 2002
Abahani Limited Dhaka	3	1985, 2016, 2017–18
Bashundhara Kings	3	2020–21, 2023–24, 2025–26
Brothers Union	1	2005
Sheikh Russel	1	2012–13
Sheikh Jamal Dhanmondi	1	2015

- Sheikh Russel won the double as part of the domestic treble in 2012–13.
- Bashundhara Kings won the double as part of the domestic treble in 2023–24.

=== Bhutan ===
Bhutan has no national cup, the Bhutan National League is the only national football competition in the country.

=== Brunei ===
In Brunei, two teams have won the Double of the Brunei Premier League / Brunei Super League and the Brunei FA Cup.

Club	Number	Seasons
MS ABDB	2	2015, 2016
DPMM FC	1	2004

=== Cambodia ===
In Cambodia, two teams have won the Double of the Cambodian League and the Hun Sen Cup.

Club	Number	Seasons
Preah Khan Reach Svay Rieng	2	2023–24, 2025–26
Phnom Penh Crown	1	2008

=== China ===
In China, four teams have won the Double of the Chinese Jia-A League / Chinese Super League and the Chinese FA Cup.

Club	Number	Seasons
Shandong Taishan	3	1999, 2006, 2021
Dalian Shide	2	2001, 2005
Guangzhou	2	2012, 2016
Shanghai Port	1	2024

=== Chinese Taipei ===
In Chinese Taipei, three teams have won the Double of the Enterprise Football League / Intercity Football League / Taiwan Football Premier League and the CTFA Cup / Taiwan President FA Cup.

Club	Number	Seasons
Taiwan Power Company	2	1997, 2002
Tatung	1	2005
Tainan City	1	2025-26

=== East Timor ===
Now in East Timor there is no national cup, the Super Liga Timorense is the only national football competition in the country.

=== Guam ===
In Guam two teams have won the Double of the Guam Men's Soccer League and the Guam FA Cup.

Club	Number	Seasons
Quality Distributors	2	2008, 2009
Rovers	2	2014, 2016

=== Hong Kong ===
In Hong Kong, six teams have won the Double of the Hong Kong First Division League / Hong Kong Premier League and the Hong Kong FA Cup.

Club	Number	Seasons
South China	5	1986–87, 1987–88, 1989–90, 1990–91, 2006–07
Kitchee	5	2011–12, 2014–15, 2016–17, 2017–18, 2022–23
Seiko	3	1974–75, 1979–80, 1980–81
Eastern	2	1992–93, 1993–94
Double Flower	1	1997–98
Sun Hei	1	2004–05

=== India ===
In India, three teams have won the Double of the National Football League (now I-League) / Indian Super League and the Federation Cup (now Super Cup).

Club	Number	Seasons
Mohun Bagan	1	2001–02
Dempo	1	2004–05
Mahindra United	1	2005–06

=== Indonesia ===
In Indonesia only one team has won the Double of the Indonesia Super League / Indonesian Premier League and the Piala Indonesia.

Club	Number	Seasons
Sriwijaya	1	2007–08

=== Iran ===
In Iran, two teams have won the Double of the Azadegan League / Iran Pro League and the Hazfi Cup.

Club	Number	Seasons
Persepolis	3	1998–99, 2018–19, 2022–23
Saipa	1	1993–94

=== Iraq ===
In Iraq, five teams have won the Double of the Iraq Stars League and the Iraq FA Cup.

Club	Number	Seasons
Al-Zawra'a	8	1975–76, 1978–79, 1990–91, 1993–94, 1994–95, 1995–96, 1998–99, 1999–2000
Al-Quwa Al-Jawiya	3	1991–92, 1996–97, 2020–21
Al-Rasheed	2	1986–87, 1987–88
Al-Talaba	1	2001–02
Al-Shorta	1	2023–24

=== Japan ===
The Japanese Double is generally considered to be winning the league championship (the Japan Soccer League Division 1 until 1991–92 and the J.League Division 1 since then) and the Emperor's Cup. Winning the second division title and the Emperor's Cup is rarer.

First Division and Emperor's Cup

Club	Doubles	Seasons
Urawa Red Diamonds	3	1973, 1978, 2006
Kashima Antlers	3	2000, 2007, 2016
Sanfrecce Hiroshima	2	1965, 1967
Shonan Bellmare	2	1977, 1979
Tokyo Verdy	2	1984, 1987
Kashiwa Reysol	1	1972
Cerezo Osaka	1	1974
JEF United Ichihara Chiba	1	1976
Yokohama F. Marinos	1	1989
Gamba Osaka	1	2014
Kawasaki Frontale	1	2020
Vissel Kobe	1	2024

Second Division and Emperor's Cup

Club	Doubles	Seasons
NKK	1	1981
Júbilo Iwata	1	1982
FC Tokyo	1	2011

=== Jordan ===
In Jordan, four teams have won the Double of the Jordan Premier League and the Jordan FA Cup.

Club	Number	Seasons
Al-Faisaly	11	1983, 1989, 1992, 1993, 1999, 2001, 2002–03, 2003–04, 2011–12, 2016–17, 2018–19
Al-Wehdat	5	1996, 1997, 2008–09, 2010–11, 2013–14
Shabab Al-Ordon	1	2005–06
Al-Hussein	1	2026–26

=== North Korea ===
In North Korea, three teams have won the Double of the DPR Korea League / DPR Korea Premier Football League and the DPRK Championships / Hwaebul Cup.

Club	Number	Seasons
April 25	3	2011, 2013, 2015
Pyongyang City	1	2004
Amnokkang	1	2008

=== South Korea ===
In South Korea, two teams have won the Double of the First Division and the Korean National Football Championship in semi-professional era. In professional era, two teams have won the K League 1 and the Korean Cup and three teams have won the Double of the K League 1 and the League Cup.

First Division and National Football Championship

Club	Number	Seasons
Korea Hydro & Nuclear Power FC	1	1965
Seoul City	1	1980

First Division and Korean Cup

Club	Number	Seasons
Jeonbuk Hyundai Motors	2	2020, 2025
Pohang Steelers	1	2013

FA Cup and AFC Champions League (former Asian Club Championship)

Club	Number	Seasons
Suwon Samsung Bluewings	1	2002

=== Kyrgyzstan ===
In Kyrgyzstan, four teams have won the Double of the Kyrgyzstan League and the Kyrgyzstan Cup.

Club	Number	Seasons
Dordoi	7	2004, 2005, 2006, 2008, 2012, 2014, 2018
Alga	5	1992, 1993, 2000, 2001, 2002
Alay	1	2013
Abdysh-Ata Kant	1	2022

=== Kuwait ===
In Kuwait, three teams have won the Double of the Kuwaiti Premier League and the Kuwait Emir Cup.

Club	Number	Seasons
Al-Kuwait	6	1977, 2016–17, 2017–18, 2018–19, 2022–23, 2024–25
Al-Arabi	5	1962, 1963, 1964, 1966, 1983
Al-Qadsia	5	1975, 2003, 2004, 2010, 2011–12

=== Laos ===
In Laos, four teams have won the Double of the Lao Premier League and the Laotian Prime Minister's Cup / Lao FF Cup.

Club	Number	Seasons
Ezra	2	2024–25, 2025–26
Yotha	1	2003
Bank	1	2010
Young Elephants	1	2022

=== Lebanon ===
In Lebanon, six teams have won the Double of the Lebanese Premier League and the Lebanese FA Cup.

Club	Number	Seasons
Al Ansar	11	1987–88, 1989–90, 1990–91, 1991–92, 1993–94, 1994–95, 1995–96, 1998–99, 2005–06, 2006–07, 2020–21
Al Ahed	3	2010–11, 2017–18, 2018–19
Al Nahda	1	1946–47
Homenetmen	1	1947–48
Tripoli	1	2002–03
Safa	1	2012–13

=== Macau ===
In Macau, two teams have won the Double of the Campeonato da 1ª Divisão and the Taça de Macau.

Club	Number	Seasons
Benfica de Macau	2	2014, 2017
Chao Pak Kei	2	2021, 2022

=== Malaysia ===
In Malaysia, eight teams have won the Double of the Malaysia League / Malaysia Semi-Pro League / Malaysia Premier League / Malaysia Super League and the Malaysia Cup or Malaysia FA Cup.

Club	Number	Seasons
Johor Darul Ta'zim	7	2016, 2017, 2019, 2022, 2023, 2024–25, 2025–26
Kedah	3	1993, 2007, 2008
Selangor	2	1984, 2009
Kuala Lumpur	1	1988
Johor FA	1	1991
Pahang	1	1992
Singapore Lions	1	1994
Kelantan	1	2012

=== Maldives ===
In Maldives, five teams have won the Double of the Maldives National Championship (1980–1999) / Dhivehi League (2000–present) and the Maldives FA Cup.

Club	Number	Seasons
New Radiant	5	1991, 1997, 2006, 2013, 2017
Club Valencia	2	1999, 2004
Victory	1	2000
VB	1	2011
Maziya	1	2022

=== Mongolia ===
In Mongolia, three teams have won the Double of the Double of the Niislel League and the Mongolia Cup.

Club	Number	Seasons
Erchim	5	1996, 1998, 2000, 2012, 2015
Ulaanbaatar	1	2022–23
SP Falcons	1	2023–24

=== Myanmar ===
In Myanmar, two teams have won the Double of the Myanmar National League and the General Aung San Shield.

Club	Number	Seasons
Yangon United	2	2011, 2018
Shan United	2	2017, 2024–25

=== Northern Mariana Islands ===
In the Northern Mariana Islands, only one team has won the double of the M*League Division 1 and the Northern Mariana Cup.

Club	Number	Seasons
Inter Godfather's	2	2008, 2009

=== Oman ===
In Oman six teams have won the Double of the Omani League and the Sultan Qaboos Cup.

Club	Number	Seasons
Fanja	5	1976–77, 1978–79, 1985–86, 1986–87, 1987–88
Dhofar	2	2004–05, 2020–21
Al-Suwaiq	1	2012–13
Al-Oruba Sur	1	2014–15
Al-Seeb	1	2021–22
Al-Nahda	1	2022–23

=== Pakistan ===
In Pakistan, three teams have won the Double of the Pakistan Premier League and the Pakistan National Football Challenge Cup.

Club	Number	Seasons
Khan Research Laboratories	2	2010, 2012
Crescent Textiles Mills	1	1987
Allied Bank	1	1999

=== Philippines ===
Due to the sporadic nature of football competitions in the country, with a league not in place until the 21st century, and only the United Football League (UFL) to last more than a season, and a national cup competition not being consistently held annually, achieving a double has been mostly impossible until recently. The establishment of the UFL in 2009 led to annual league and cup tournaments. The institution of the PFF National Men's Club Championship (the national cup) in 2011 (next held in 2013) after years of dormancy meant that a domestic treble could now be contested. In 2013, a super cup is expected to be played, paving the way for a UFL treble.

During the existence of the UFL from 2009 to 2016, a league double has been achieved thrice. A domestic double (a title each from the UFL and the PFF) or a domestic treble (a UFL double and a PFF title) has not been won.

Club	Number	Seasons
Philippine Air Force	1	2009–10 (UFL Cup and United Football League)
Stallion Sta. Lucia	1	2012–13 (UFL Cup and United Football League)
Global	1	2016 (UFL Cup and United Football League)
Ceres-Negros	1	2019 (Philippines Football League and Copa Paulino Alcantara)

=== Qatar ===
In Qatar, three teams have won the Double of the Qatar Stars League and the Emir of Qatar Cup.

Club	Number	Seasons
Al Sadd	5	1987–88, 1999–2000, 2006–07, 2020–21, 2023–24
Al-Gharafa	3	1997–98, 2001–02, 2008–09
Al-Arabi	2	1982–83, 1992–93

=== Saudi Arabia ===
In Saudi Arabia, five teams have won the Double of the Saudi Pro League and the King's Cup (1956–1990, 2008–present) / Crown Prince Cup (1990–2007).

Club	Number	Seasons
Al-Hilal	4	2004–05, 2016–17, 2019–20, 2023–24
Al-Ittihad	3	1996–97, 2000–01, 2024–25
Al-Ahli	2	1977–78, 2015–16
Al-Nassr	1	1980–81
Al-Shabab	1	1992–93

=== Singapore ===
In Singapore, four teams have won the Double of the S.League and the Singapore Cup.

Club	Number	Seasons
Albirex Niigata Singapore	3	2016, 2017, 2018
Lion City Sailors	3	2003, 2024–25, 2025–26
Warriors	2	2007, 2008
Tampines Rovers	1	2004

=== Sri Lanka ===
In Sri Lanka, three teams have won the Double of the Sri Lanka Football Premier League and the Sri Lanka FA Cup.

Club	Number	Seasons
Saunders	5	1985, 1992, 1997, 1998–99, 2000–01
Renown	2	1990, 1994
Ratnam	1	1999–2000

=== Syria ===
In Syria, six teams have won the Double of the Syrian Premier League and the Syrian Cup.

Club	Number	Seasons
Al-Karamah	5	1982–83, 1995–96, 2006–07, 2007–08, 2008–09
Al-Jaish Damascus	4	1985–86, 1997–98, 2001–02, 2017–18
Al-Fotuwa	3	1989–90, 1990–91, 2023–24
Al-Shorta Damascus	1	1979–80
Hurriya	1	1991–92
Al-Ittihad Aleppo	1	2004–05

=== Tajikistan ===
In Tajikistan, six teams have won the Double of the Tajik League and the Tajik Cup.

Club	Number	Seasons
Istiqlol	8	2010, 2014, 2015, 2016, 2018, 2019, 2022, 2023
Regar-TadAZ	2	2001, 2006
Pomir Dushanbe	1	1992
Sitora	1	1993
Vakhsh	1	1997
Varzob	1	1999

=== Thailand ===
In Thailand, two teams have won the Double of the Kor Royal Cup (1916–1995)/Thai Premier League (1996–present) and the Thai FA Cup.

Club	Number	Seasons
Buriram United	7	2011, 2013, 2015, 2021–22, 2022–23, 2024–25, 2025–26
Bangkok Bank	1	1981

=== Turkmenistan ===
In Turkmenistan, six teams have won the Double of the Ýokary Liga and the Turkmenistan Cup.

Club	Number	Seasons
Köpetdag	3	1993, 1994, 2000
Balkan	3	2004, 2010, 2012
Altyn Asyr	3	2015, 2016, 2019
Arkadag	3	2023, 2024, 2025
Aşgabat	1	2006
Ahal	1	2022

=== United Arab Emirates ===
In the United Arab Emirates, five teams have won the Double of the UAE Pro League and the UAE President's Cup.

Club	Number	Seasons
Al Wasl	2	2006–07, 2023–24
Al Ahli	2	1974–75, 2024–25
Al Ain	2	2017–18, 2025–26
Al Nasr	1	1985–86
Al Shabab	1	1989–90
Al Jazira	1	2010–11

=== Uzbekistan ===
In Uzbekistan, five teams have won the Double of the Uzbek League and the Uzbekistan Cup.

Club	Number	Seasons
Pakhtakor	8	2002, 2003, 2004, 2005, 2006, 2007, 2019, 2020
Bunyodkor	3	2008, 2010, 2013
Lokomotiv Tashkent	2	2016, 2017
Neftchi Fergana	1	1994
Dustlik	1	2000

=== Vietnam ===
In Vietnam, four teams have won the Double of the V.League 1 and the Vietnamese National Cup.

Club	Number	Seasons
Hanoi	2	2019, 2022
Đồng Tâm Long An	1	2005
Da Nang	1	2009
Becamex Bình Dương	1	2015

=== Yemen ===
In Yemen, four teams have won the Double of the North Yemen Champions/Yemeni League and the Cup of the Republic / Yemeni President Cup.

Club	Number	Seasons
Al-Ahli Sana'a	3	1982–83, 1983–84, 2001
Shaab Ibb	1	2002–03
Al-Hilal Al-Sahili	1	2008
Al-Saqr	1	2014

== Africa ==
=== Algeria ===
In Algeria, five teams have won the Double of the Algerian Ligue Professionnelle 1 and the Algerian Cup.

Club	Number	Seasons
Belouizdad	3	1965–66, 1968–69, 1969–70
Kabylie	2	1976–77, 1985–86
Sétif	2	1967–68, 2011–12
MC Alger	1	1975–76
USM Alger	1	2002–03

=== Angola ===
In Angola, three teams have won the Double of the Girabola and the Taça de Angola.

Club	Number	Seasons
Petro de Luanda	8	1987, 1993, 1994, 1997, 2000, 2021–22, 2022–23, 2023–24
Primeiro de Agosto	3	1991, 2006, 2018
Primeiro de Maio	1	1983

=== Benin ===
In Benin, two teams have won the Double of the Benin Premier League and the Benin Cup.

Club	Number	Seasons
Étoile Sportive Porto-Novo	1	1974
Dragons Porto-Novo	1	1986

=== Botswana ===
In Botswana, eight teams have won the Double of the Botswana Premier League and the FA Challenge Cup.

Club	Number	Seasons
Mogoditshane Fighters	3	1999, 2000, 2003
Township Rollers	3	1979, 2005, 2010
Gaborone United	3	1970, 1990, 2022
Defence Force Gaborone	2	1989, 2004
Notwane	1	1978
Extension Gunners	1	1992
Mochudi Centre Chiefs	1	2008
Jwaneng Galaxy	1	2024

=== Burkina Faso ===
In Burkina Faso, four teams have won the Double of the Burkinabé Premier League and the Coupe du Faso.

Club	Number	Seasons
Étoile Filante de Ouagadougou	8	1965, 1985, 1988, 1990, 1992, 1993, 2001, 2008
ASFA Yennenga	2	2009, 2013
Rahimo	2	2019, 2025
Rail Club du Kadiogo	1	2016

=== Burundi ===
In Burundi, two teams have won the Double of the Burundi Premier League and the Burundian Cup.

Club	Number	Seasons
Vital'O	5	1986, 1994, 1996, 1999, 2014–15
Aigle Noir Makamba	1	2018–19

=== Cameroon ===
In Cameroon five teams have won the Double of the Elite One and the Cameroonian Cup.

Club	Number	Seasons
Coton Sport	7	2003, 2004, 2007, 2008, 2011, 2014, 2022
Canon	2	1977, 1986
Oryx	1	1963
Union Douala	1	1969
Tonnerre	1	1987

=== Cape Verde ===
In Cape Verde, only one team has won the Double of the Campeonato Nacional de Cabo Verde and the Taça Nacional de Cabo Verde.

Club	Number	Seasons
Boavista Praia	1	2010

=== Central African Republic ===
In Central African Republic, only one team has won the Double of the CAR League and the CAR Coupe Nationale.

Club	Number	Seasons
Tempête Mocaf	1	2003

=== Chad ===
In Chad, no team has won the Double of the Chad Premier League and the Chad Cup.

=== Comoros ===
In Comoros, three teams have won the Double of the Comoros Premier League and the Comoros Cup.

Club	Number	Seasons
Apache Club	1	2009
US Zilimadjou	1	2020
Djabal Club	1	2023

=== Democratic Republic of the Congo ===
In the Democratic Republic of the Congo, six teams have won the Double of the Linafoot and the Coupe du Congo.

Club	Number	Seasons
Vita Club	5	1971, 1972, 1973, 1975, 1977
Motema Pembe	4	1964, 1674, 1978, 1994
Mazembe	4	1966, 1967, 1976, 2000
Dragons Kinshasa	1	1965
Saint Eloi Lupopo	1	1968
Bilombe	1	1992

=== Republic of the Congo ===
In the Republic of the Congo, three teams have won the Double of the Congo Premier League and the Coupe du Congo.

Club	Number	Seasons
Léopards	3	2013, 2016, 2017
Étoile du Congo	2	2000, 2006
CARA	1	1981

=== Djibouti ===
In Djibouti, five teams have won the Double of the Djibouti Premier League and the Djibouti Cup.

Club	Number	Seasons
Force Nationale de Police	2	1996–97, 1997–98
Port	2	2009–10, 2010–11
Arta/Solar7	2	2020–21, 2021–22
Aéroport	1	1990–91
Djibouti Télécom	1	2015–16

=== Egypt ===
In Egypt, two teams have won the Double of the Egyptian Premier League and the Egypt Cup.

Club	Number	Seasons
Al Ahly	16	1948–49, 1949–50, 1950–51, 1952–53, 1955–56, 1957–58, 1960–61, 1980–81, 1984–85, 1988–89, 1995–96, 2005–06, 2006–07, 2016–17, 2019–20, 2022–23
Zamalek	4	1959–60, 1987–88, 2014–15, 2020–21

=== Equatorial Guinea ===
In Equatorial Guinea, no team has won the Double of the Equatoguinean Premier League and the Equatoguinean Cup.

=== Eritrea ===
In Eritrea, no team has won the Double of the Eritrean Premier League and the Eritrean Cup.

=== Ethiopia ===
In Ethiopia, three teams have won the Double of the Ethiopian Premier League and the Ethiopian Cup.

Club	Number	Seasons
Mechal (includes Army)	5	1949, 1951, 1954, 1956, 1982
Saint George	2	1999, 2016
EEPCO	1	2001

=== Gabon ===
In Gabon, five teams have won the Double of the Gabon Championnat National D1 and the Coupe du Gabon Interclubs.

Club	Number	Seasons
US Bitam	2	2003, 2010
105 Libreville	1	1986
USM Libreville	1	2002
Mangasport	1	2005
Mounana	1	2016

=== The Gambia ===
In The Gambia, two teams have won the Double of the GFA League First Division and the Gambian Cup.

Club	Number	Seasons
Wallidan	5	1976, 2001, 2002, 2004, 2008
Real de Banjul	1	1997

=== Ghana ===
In Ghana, three teams have won the Double of the Ghana Premier League and the Ghanaian FA Cup.

Club	Number	Seasons
Hearts of Oak	6	1973, 1979, 1990, 1999, 2000, 2021
Asante Kotoko	2	1959, 2014
Real Republicans Accra	1	1962–63

=== Guinea ===
In Guinea, two teams have won the Double of the Guinée Championnat National and the Guinée Coupe Nationale.

Club	Number	Seasons
Horoya	6	1989, 1994, 2013, 2016, 2018, 2019
Kaloum Star	2	1998, 2007

=== Guinea-Bissau ===
In Guinea-Bissau, four teams have won the Double of the Campeonato Nacional da Guiné-Bissau and the Taça Nacional da Guiné Bissau.

Club	Number	Seasons
Benfica Bissau	6	1980, 1989, 2010, 2015, 2018, 2022
SC de Bissau	3	1986, 1991, 2005
União Desportiva Internacional	1	1985
Canchungo	1	2023

=== Ivory Coast ===
In the Ivory Coast, two teams have won the Double of the Ligue 1 and the Coupe de Côte d'Ivoire.

Club	Number	Seasons
Mimosas	10	1970, 1972, 1973, 1990, 1995, 1997, 2003, 2005, 2018, 2023
Africa Sports	6	1977, 1978, 1982, 1985, 1986, 1989

=== Kenya ===
In Kenya, three teams have won the Double of the Kenyan Premier League and the President's Cup.

Club	Number	Seasons
Gor Mahia	4	1964, 1976, 1983, 1987
Leopards	1	1967
Tusker	1	2016

=== Lesotho ===
In Lesotho, five teams have won the Double of the Lesotho Premier League and the Lesotho Independence Cup.

Club	Number	Seasons
Arsenal Maseru	2	1989, 1991
Matlama	2	1992, 2019
RLDF	1	1990
Lioli	1	2016
Bantu	1	2017

=== Liberia ===
In Liberia, eight teams have won the Double of the Liberian Premier League and the Liberian Cup.

Club	Number	Seasons
Mighty Barrolle	3	1974, 1986, 1995
Invincible Eleven	3	1987, 1997, 1998
LPRC Oilers	2	1999, 2005
Barrack Young Controllers	2	2013, 2018
LISCR	2	2017, 2023
NPA Anchors	1	1994
Junior Professional	1	1996
Monrovia Black Star	1	2008

=== Libya ===
In Libya, two teams have won the Double of the Libyan Premier League and the Libyan Cup.

Club	Number	Seasons
Al Ahli Tripoli	5	1994, 2000, 2016, 2023, 2025
Al-Ittihad Tripoli	3	2005, 2007, 2009

=== Madagascar ===
In Madagascar, six teams have won the Double of the THB Champions League and the Coupe de Madagascar.

Club	Number	Seasons
CNaPS Sport	2	2015, 2016
Dinamo Fima	1	1983
USJF Ravinala	1	2004
USCA Foot	1	2005
Fosa Juniors FC	1	2019
AS Elgeco Plus	1	2025

=== Malawi ===
In Malawi, two teams have won the Double of the Malawi Premier Division and the Malawi FAM Cup.

Club	Number	Seasons
Nyasa Big Bullets	2	2022, 2023
Silver Strikers	1	2014

=== Mali ===
In Mali, three teams have won the Double of the Malian Première Division and the Malian Cup.

Club	Number	Seasons
Djoliba	12	1970–71, 1972–73, 1973–74, 1974–75, 1975–76, 1978–79, 1995–96, 1997–98, 2003–04, 2007–08, 2008–09, 2021–22
Stade Malien	9	1969–70, 1971–72, 1983–84, 1993–94, 2000–01, 2005–06, 2012–13, 2014–15, 2020–21
Real Bamako	3	1968–69, 1979–80, 1990–91

=== Mauritania ===
In Mauritania, three teams have won the Double of the Ligue 1 Mauritania and the Coupe du Président de la République.

Club	Number	Seasons
Nouadhibou	2	2018, 2023
Tevragh-Zeïna	1	2012, 2016
Ksar	1	1993

=== Mauritius ===
In Mauritius, ten teams have won the Double of the Mauritian League and the Mauritian Cup.

Club	Number	Seasons
Fire Brigade	3	1979–80, 1982–83, 1993–94
Sunrise	3	1986–87, 1991–92, 1995–96
Police Club Port Louis	2	1962, 1965
Dodo	2	1957, 1966
Port-Louis 2000	2	2002, 2004–05
Curepipe Starlight	1	2007–08
Pamplemousses	1	2017–18
GRSE Wanderers	1	2022–23
Cercle de Joachim	1	2024–25
La Cure Waves	1	2025–26

=== Morocco ===
In Morocco, three teams have won the Double of the Botola and the Coupe du Trône.

Club	Number	Seasons
FAR Rabat	2	1984, 2008
Raja Club Athletic	2	1995–96, 2024
Wydad Athletic Club	1	1978

=== Mozambique ===
In Mozambique, five teams have won the Double of the Moçambola and the Taça de Moçambique.

Club	Number	Seasons
Costa do Sol	5	1980, 1992, 1993, 1999–2000, 2007
Ferroviário de Maputo	2	1989, 2009
Maxaquene	1	1986
Matchedje Maputo	1	1990
Desportivo de Maputo	1	2006

=== Namibia ===
In Namibia, only one team has won the Double of the Namibia Premier League and the NFA Cup.

Club	Number	Seasons
African Stars	3	2010, 2018, 2024

=== Niger ===
In Niger, eleven teams have won the Double of the Niger Premier League and the Niger Cup.

Club	Number	Seasons
Sahel	5	1974, 1986, 1992, 1996, 2004
Niamey	2	1980, 1981
Olympic de Niamey	1	1977
Jangorzo	1	1983
Espoir	1	1984
JS du Ténéré	1	2000
AS Police	1	2008
AS FAN	1	2010
AS SONIDEP	1	2019
US GN	1	2021
AS GNN	1	2023

=== Nigeria ===
In Nigeria, seven teams have won the Double of the Nigeria Premier League and the Nigerian FA Cup.

Club	Number	Seasons
Enugu Rangers	3	1974, 1975, 1981
Leventis United	1	1986
Heartland	1	1988
BCC Lions	1	1994
Shooting Stars	1	1995
Dolphins Port Harcourt	1	2004
Enyimba International	1	2005

=== Rwanda ===
In Rwanda, three teams have won the Double of the Primus National Football League and the Rwandan Cup.

Club	Number	Seasons
APR	8	2006, 2006–07, 2009–10, 2010–11, 2011–12, 2013–14, 2024–25, 2025–26
Panthères Noires	3	1980, 1984, 1987
Rayon Sports	1	1998

=== São Tomé and Príncipe ===
In São Tomé and Príncipe, six teams have won the Double of the São Tomé and Príncipe Championship and the Taça Nacional de São Tomé e Príncipe.

Club	Number	Seasons
Vitória Riboque	3	1986, 1989, 2011
Sporting Praia Cruz	3	1982, 1994, 2015
UDRA	2	2014, 2017
Desportivo de Guadalupe	1	1981
6 de Setembro	1	1988
Santana	1	1991
Sporting Príncipe	1	2012

=== Senegal ===
In Senegal, four teams have won the Double of the Senegal Premier League and the Senegal FA Cup.

Club	Number	Seasons
Diaraf	5	1968, 1970, 1975, 1982, 1995
Jeanne d'Arc	1	1969
Douanes Dakar	1	1997
Pikine	1	2014
Casa Sports	1	2022

=== Seychelles ===
In Seychelles, three teams have won the Double of the Seychelles First Division and the Seychelles FA Cup.

Club	Number	Seasons
St Michel United	5	1997, 2007, 2008, 2011, 2014
Saint Louis Suns United	2	1988, 2017
Foresters	1	2020

=== Sierra Leone ===
In Sierra Leone, two teams have won the Double of the Sierra Leone National Premier League and the Sierra Leonean FA Cup.

Club	Number	Seasons
Mighty Blackpool	2	1988, 2000
East End Lions	1	1980

=== Somalia ===
In Somalia, only one team has won the Double of the Somalia League and the Somalia Cup.

Club	Number	Seasons
Dekedaha	1	2024

=== South Africa ===
In South Africa, 13 teams have won the Double of the NFL / SASL / FPL / NPSL / NSL / Premiership and the NFL Cup / SASF Cup / Nedbank Cup.

Club	Number	Seasons
Kaizer Chiefs	7	1976, 1977, 1979, 1981, 1984, 1992, 2012–13
Highlands Park	3	1965, 1966, 1975
Orlando Pirates	4	1973, 1975, 2010–11, 2011–12
Mamelodi Sundowns	3	1998, 2019–20, 2021–22
Avalon Athletic	2	1962, 1963
Lightbody's Santos	2	1988, 1990
Addington	1	1963
Glenville	1	1972
Arcadia Shepherds	1	1974
Cape Town City	1	1976
Durban City	1	1978
Battswood	1	1989
Cape Town Spurs	1	1995

=== South Sudan ===
In South Sudan, three teams have won the Double of the South Sudan Football Championship and the South Sudan National Cup.

Club	Number	Seasons
Al-Malakia	1	2014
Al-Salam	1	2017
Jamus	1	2025

=== Sudan ===
In Sudan, two teams have won the Double of the Sudan Premier League and the Sudan Cup.

Club	Number	Seasons
Al-Merrikh	11	1970, 1971, 1972, 1974, 1985, 1993, 2001, 2008, 2013, 2015, 2018
Al-Hilal Omdurman	6	1998, 2004, 2009, 2016, 2022, 2025

=== Swaziland ===
In Swaziland, two teams have won the Double of the Swazi Premier League and the Swazi Cup.

Club	Number	Seasons
Royal Leopards	2	2007, 2014
Mbabane Swallows	1	2013

=== Tanzania ===
In Tanzania, three teams have won the Double of the Tanzanian Premier League and the Nyerere Cup/Tanzania FA Cup.

Club	Number	Seasons
Young Africans	5	2015–16, 2021–22, 2022–23, 2023–24, 2024–25
Simba	3	1995, 2019–20, 2020–21
Coastal Union	1	1988

=== Togo ===
In Togo, five teams have won the Double of the Togolese Championnat National and the Coupe du Togo.

Club	Number	Seasons
Étoile Filante Lomé	1	1961
Semassi	1	1982
Agaza	1	1984
Dynamic Togolais	1	2001
Togo-Port	1	2017

=== Tunisia ===
In Tunisia, ten teams have won the Double of the Tunisian Ligue Professionnelle 1 and the Tunisian Cup.

Club	Number	Seasons
Espérance de Tunis	6	1989, 1991, 1999, 2006, 2011, 2025
US Tunisienne	3	1929–30, 1930–31, 1932–33
CS Hammam-Lif	3	1950–51, 1953–54, 1954–55
Club Africain	3	1967, 1973, 1992
CS Sfaxien	2	1971, 1995
Sporting Club (Tunis)	1	1925–26
Stade Gaulois (Tunis)	1	1926–27
Italia (Tunis)	1	1935–36
Stade Tunisien	1	1962
Étoile du Sahel	1	1963

=== Uganda ===
In Uganda, four teams have won the Double of the Ugandan Super League and the Ugandan Cup.

Club	Number	Seasons
Villa	6	1986, 1988, 1989, 1998, 2000, 2002
Vipers	2	2022–23, 2024–25
Express	1	1995
KCCA	1	2016–17

=== Zambia ===
In Zambia, six teams have won the Double of the Zambian Premier League and the Zambian Cup (defunct).

Club	Number	Seasons
Nkana	4	1986, 1989, 1992, 1993
Mufulira Wanderers	4	1965, 1966, 1976, 1995
Kabwe Warriors	2	1972, 1987
Roan United	1	1962
Power Dynamos	1	1997
Zanaco	1	2002

=== Zimbabwe ===
In Zimbabwe, six teams have won the Double of the Zimbabwe Premier Soccer League and the Cup of Zimbabwe.

Club	Number	Seasons
Dynamos	7	1976, 1985, 1986, 1989, 2007, 2011, 2012
Bulawayo Rovers	1	1962
Zimbabwe Saints	1	1977
Black Rhinos	1	1984
Highlanders	1	1990
CAPS United	1	2004

== Other countries ==
=== Greenland ===
The Greenlandic Football Championship is the only national football competition in the country.

=== Kiribati ===
In Kiribati, there is no national cup; the Kiribati National Championship is the only national football competition in the country.

=== Northern Cyprus ===
In Northern Cyprus, six teams have won the Double of the Birinci Lig and the Kıbrıs Kupası/Federasyon Kupası.

Club	Number	Seasons
Mağusa Türk Gücü	5	1976–77, 1978–79, 1982–83, 2018–19, 2021–22
Çetinkaya Türk	3	1957–58, 1959–60, 1969–70
Gönyeli	3	1994–95, 2007–08, 2008–09
Yenicami Ağdelen	3	1972–73, 1973–74, 2014–15
Küçük Kaymaklı Türk	1	1985–86
Gençlik Gücü	1	2025-26

=== Réunion ===
In Réunion, five teams have won the Double of the Réunion Premier League and the Coupe de la Réunion.

Club	Number	Seasons
Saint-Louisienne	6	1964, 1968, 1969, 1970, 1998, 2002
Saint-Pierroise	6	1959, 1971, 1989, 1994, 2018, 2019
Stade Tamponnaise	3	1991, 2003, 2009
Saint-Pauloise	1	2011
Excelsior	1	2024

=== Zanzibar ===
In Zanzibar, only one team has won the Double of the Zanzibar Premier League and the Nyerere Cup / Zanzibari Cup.

Club	Number	Seasons
Miembeni	1	1987

== League and league cup double ==
A rarer (though less coveted) domestic double is that of winning the league championship and the league cup. In many leagues, this cannot be done as there is no second domestic cup competition (such as in Italy and the Netherlands) or it has been disbanded (such as in Spain and Denmark). The format of league cups and the number of participating teams can vary enormously from one country to another. In the case of Germany, the DFB-Ligapokal was played in the summer months prior to the Bundesliga and therefore was won in the preceding calendar year to the title win.

Club	Country	Number won	Year(s) won	Notes
Rangers	Scotland	17	1947, 1949, 1961, 1964, 1976, 1978, 1987, 1989, 1991, 1993, 1994, 1997, 1999, 2003, 2005, 2010, 2011	In 1976 as part of a domestic Quadruple with the Scottish Cup and the Glasgow Cup; in 1949, 1964, 1978, 1993, 1999 and 2003 as part of a domestic Treble with the Scottish Cup
Celtic	Scotland	16	1966, 1967, 1968, 1969, 1970, 1998, 2001, 2006, 2015, 2017, 2018, 2019, 2020, 2022, 2023, 2025	In 1967 as part of the Quintuple with the European Cup, Scottish Cup and the Glasgow Cup; in 1969, 2001, 2017, 2018, 2019, 2020 and 2023 as part of a domestic Treble with the Scottish Cup
The New Saints	Wales	7	2006, 2010, 2015, 2016, 2017, 2018, 2024	In 2015 and 2016 as part of a domestic Treble with the Welsh Cup
Shamrock Rovers	Republic of Ireland	6	1925, 1927, 1932, 1938, 1957, 1964	In 1925, 1932 and 1964 as part of a domestic Treble with the FAI Cup
Linfield	Northern Ireland	6	1987, 1994, 2000, 2006, 2008, 2019	In 1994, 2006 and 2008 as part of a domestic Treble with the Irish Cup
Bohemian	Republic of Ireland	5	1924, 1928, 1934, 1975, 2009	In 1928 as part of a domestic Treble with the FAI Cup
Paris Saint-Germain	France	5	2014, 2015, 2016, 2018, 2020	In 2015, 2016, 2018 and 2020 as part of a domestic Treble with the Coupe de France
Tokyo Verdy	Japan	4	1991, 1992, 1993, 1994	
Sunrise	Mauritius	4	1990, 1992, 1996, 1997	In 1992 and 1996 as part of a domestic Treble with the Mauritian Cup
Benfica	Portugal	4	2010, 2014, 2015, 2016	In 2014 as part of a domestic Treble with the Taça de Portugal
Manchester City	England	4	2014, 2018, 2019, 2021	In 2019 as part of a domestic Treble with the FA Cup
Buriram United	Thailand	4	2011, 2013, 2015, 2021–22	All as part of a domestic Treble with the Thai FA Cup
Liverpool	England	3	1982, 1983, 1984	In 1984 as part of a Treble with the European Cup
Barry Town	Wales	3	1997, 1998, 1999	In 1997 as part of a domestic Treble with the Welsh Cup
Bayern Munich	Germany	3	1997, 1999, 2000	In 2000 as part of a domestic Treble with the DFB-Pokal
Kaizer Chiefs	South Africa	3	1984, 1989, 2004	In 1984 as part of a domestic Treble with the Nedbank Cup, in 1989 as part of a domestic Treble with the MTN 8
FH	Iceland	3	2004, 2006, 2009	
Maccabi Haifa	Israel	3	1994, 2006, 2022	
Maccabi Tel Aviv	Israel	3	2015, 2019, 2024	In 2015 as part of a domestic Treble with the Israel State Cup
Shelbourne	Republic of Ireland	2	1926, 1944	
Yokohama F. Marinos	Japan	2	1989, 1990	In 1989 as part of a domestic Treble with the Emperor's Cup
Mamelodi Sundowns	South Africa	2	1990, 1999	In 1990 as part of a domestic Treble with the MTN 8
W Connection	Trinidad and Tobago	2	2001, 2005	
Glentoran	Northern Ireland	2	2003, 2005	
Sun Hei	Hong Kong	2	2004, 2005	In 2005 as part of a domestic Quadruple with the Hong Kong Senior Shield and the Hong Kong FA Cup
AS Port-Louis 2000	Mauritius	2	2004, 2005	In 2005 as part of a domestic Treble with the Mauritian Cup
Suwon Samsung Bluewings	South Korea	2	1999, 2008	
Curepipe	Mauritius	2	2007, 2008	In 2008 as part of a domestic Treble with the Mauritian Cup
Cliftonville	Northern Ireland	2	2013, 2014	
Dundalk	Republic of Ireland	2	1967, 2014	
Chelsea	England	2	2005, 2015	
Kitchee	Hong Kong	2	2012, 2015	As part of a domestic Treble with the Hong Kong FA Cup
Pamplemousses	Mauritius	2	2010, 2017	
Boca Juniors	Argentina	2	2020, 2022	
Orlando Pirates	South Africa	2	2011, 2025–26	In 2011 as part of a domestic Quadruple with the Nedbank Cup and the MTN 8
Cork United	Republic of Ireland	1	1943	
Hearts	Scotland	1	1960	
Beşiktaş	Turkey	1	1966	
Waterford United	Republic of Ireland	1	1969	
Basel	Switzerland	1	1972	
Red Star Belgrade	Yugoslavia	1	1973	
Nottingham Forest	England	1	1978	
Urawa Red Diamonds	Japan	1	1978	As part of a domestic Treble with the Emperor's Cup
Servette	Switzerland	1	1979	As part of a domestic Treble with the Swiss Cup
Zürich	Switzerland	1	1981	
Athlone Town	Republic of Ireland	1	1983	
Maccabi Netanya	Israel	1	1983	
United Ichihara Chiba	Japan	1	1986	
Spartak Moscow	Soviet Union	1	1987	
Air Force Central	Thailand	1	1987	
Derry City	Republic of Ireland	1	1989	As part of a domestic Treble with the FAI Cup
Al-Talaba	Iraq	1	1993	
Haka	Finland	1	1995	
Portadown	Northern Ireland	1	1996	
ÍA	Iceland	1	1996	As part of a domestic Treble with the Icelandic Cup
Al-Quwa Al-Jawiya	Iraq	1	1997	As part of a domestic Treble with the Iraq FA Cup
Crusaders	Northern Ireland	1	1997	
Busan Daewoo Roylas	South Korea	1	1997	
HJK	Finland	1	1997	
ÍBV	Iceland	1	1997	
Beitar Jerusalem	Israel	1	1998	
Mohun Bagan	India	1	1998	
Fire Brigade	Mauritius	1	1999	
Al-Zawra'a	Iraq	1	2000	As part of a domestic Treble with the Iraq FA Cup
Anderlecht	Belgium	1	2000	
Polonia Warsaw	Poland	1	2000	
Kashima Antlers	Japan	1	2000	As part of a domestic Treble with the Emperor's Cup
Happy Valley	Hong Kong	1	2001	
Wisła Kraków	Poland	1	2001	
Legia Warsaw	Poland	1	2002	
Rhyl	Wales	1	2004	As part of a domestic Treble with the Welsh Cup
Brøndby	Denmark	1	2005	As part of a domestic Treble with the Danish Cup
Inter Turku	Finland	1	2008	
South China	Hong Kong	1	2008	
Manchester United	England	1	2009	
Melbourne Victory	Australia	1	2009	As part of a domestic Treble
Bordeaux	France	1	2009	
FC Seoul	South Korea	1	2010	
Debrecen	Hungary	1	2010	As part of a domestic Treble with the Magyar Kupa
Marseille	France	1	2010	
Étoile	Singapore	1	2010	
Salgaocar	India	1	2011	
Hapoel Kiryat Shmona	Israel	1	2012	
Lincoln Red Imps	Gibraltar	1	2014	As part of a domestic Treble with the Rock Cup
Gamba Osaka	Japan	1	2014	As part of a domestic Treble with the Emperor's Cup
Al Ahli	United Arab Emirates	1	2014	
Al Ain	United Arab Emirates	1	2022	
Steaua București	Romania	1	2015	As part of a domestic Treble with the Cupa României
Albirex Niigata Singapore	Singapore	1	2016	As part of a domestic Treble with the Singapore Cup
Muangthong United	Thailand	1	2016	Shared the 2016 Thai League Cup title with Buriram United
Valur	Iceland	1	2018	
KR	Iceland	1	2019	
Sporting CP	Portugal	1	2021	

== Doubles in lower divisions ==
In many countries, knock-out competitions exclusive to clubs outside the top division(s) also exist. This gives lower ranked clubs a chance to win a double. Examples include:

Country	Club	Lower division	Lower league cup	Season(s) won
Australia	Adelaide City	SASF Division One (second tier)	Football SA Federation Cup	1953, 1957, 1958, 1959, 1963, 1970, 1972
Australia	Adelaide City	FFSA Super League (second tier)	Football SA Federation Cup	2006, 2007
Australia	Adelaide City	National Premier Leagues South Australia (second tier)	Football SA Federation Cup	2022
Australia	Adelaide Croatia Raiders	SASF Division One (second tier)	Top Four Cup	1984
Australia	Adelaide Croatia Raiders	SASF Division One (second tier)	Football SA Federation Cup	1988
Australia	Belconnen United	Premier League (second tier)	Capital Football Federation Cup	1998
Australia	Belconnen United	National Premier Leagues Capital Football (second tier)	Capital Football Federation Cup	2014
Australia	Blacktown City	Division One (second tier)	Waratah Cup	1991
Australia	Blacktown City	National Premier Leagues NSW (second tier)	Waratah Cup	2014
Australia	Broadmeadow Magic	Northern NSW State League (second tier)	NNSWF State Cup	2012
Australia	Canberra Croatia	Division One (second tier)	Capital Football Federation Cup	1962, 1978
Australia	Canberra Croatia	Premier League (second tier)	Capital Football Federation Cup	1995, 2004, 2007, 2009, 2010, 2011
Australia	Canberra Croatia	National Premier Leagues Capital Football (second tier)	Capital Football Federation Cup	2018
Australia	Canberra Olympic	National Premier Leagues Capital Football (second tier)	Capital Football Federation Cup	2016, 2017
Australia	Croydon FC	SASF Division One (second tier)	Football SA Federation Cup	1975
Australia	Dandenong Thunder	Victorian Premier League (second tier)	FFV State Knockout Cup	2012
Australia	Devonport City	Tasmanian soccer championship (second tier)	North West Summer Cup	2003, 2004
Australia	Devonport City	Tasmanian soccer championship (second tier)	Steve Hudson Cup	1998
Australia	Devonport City	National Premier Leagues Tasmania (second tier)	Milan Lakoseljac Cup	2016, 2018, 2022, 2023
Australia	FK Beograd	SASF Division One (second tier)	Football SA Federation Cup	1983, 1993
Australia	Gungahlin United	Division One (second tier)	Capital Football Federation Cup	1965, 1968
Australia	Gungahlin United	Premier League (second tier)	Capital Football Federation Cup	2001
Australia	Gungahlin United	National Premier Leagues Capital Football (second tier)	Capital Football Federation Cup	2015
Australia	Green Gully	Victorian State League (second tier)	Dockerty Cup	1981, 1982
Australia	Melbourne Knights	Victorian State League (second tier)	Dockerty Cup	1968, 1979
Australia	Monaro Panthers	Division One (second tier)	Capital Football Federation Cup	1977
Australia	North Eastern MetroStars	SASF Premier League (second tier)	Football SA Federation Cup	2004
Australia	North Eastern MetroStars	FFSA Super League (second tier)	Football SA Federation Cup	2012
Australia	Olympia	Tasmanian soccer championship (second tier)	North West Summer Cup	1968
Australia	Olympic Kingsway	National Premier Leagues Western Australia (second tier)	Football West State Cup	2024
Australia	Perth SC	Top Four/Five Cup (second tier)	Football West State Cup	2001
Australia	Sutherland Sharks	Division One (second tier)	Waratah Cup	1978
Australia	South Hobart	Tasmanian soccer championship (second tier)	Milan Lakoseljac Cup	2008, 2010, 2011, 2014
Australia	South Hobart	NSW Premier League (second tier)	Milan Lakoseljac Cup	2009
Australia	Sorrento	Top Four/Five Cup (second tier)	Football West State Cup	2012
Australia	South Melbourne	Victorian State League (second tier)	Dockerty Cup	1974
Australia	Stirling Macedonia	Top Four/Five Cup (second tier)	Football West State Cup	1992, 1996
Australia	West Adelaide	SASF Division One (second tier)	Top Four Cup	1987
Bulgaria	Arda Kardzhali	Third Amateur Football League (third tier)	Cup of Bulgarian Amateur Football League	2017–18
Bulgaria	Dunav Ruse	Third Amateur Football League (third tier)	Cup of Bulgarian Amateur Football League	2014–15
Bulgaria	OFC Nesebar	Third Amateur Football League (third tier)	Cup of Bulgarian Amateur Football League	2015–16
England	Altrincham	Football Conference (fifth tier)	Bob Lord Challenge Trophy	1980–81
England	Birmingham City	Football League Second Division (third tier)	Football League Trophy	1994–95
England	Bristol City	Football League One (third tier)	Football League Trophy	2014–15
England	Colchester United	Football Conference (fifth tier)	FA Trophy	1991–92
England	Coventry City	Football League Third Division South (third tier)	Football League Third Division South Cup	1935–36
England	Milton Keynes Dons	Football League Two (fourth tier)	Football League Trophy	2007–08
England	Wealdstone	Football Conference (fifth tier)	FA Trophy	1984–85
England	Wolverhampton Wanderers	Football League Fourth Division (fourth tier)	Associate Members' Cup	1987–88
England	Wycombe Wanderers	Football Conference (fifth tier)	FA Trophy	1992–93
Germany	1. FC Magdeburg	Regionalliga Nordost (fourth tier)	Saxony-Anhalt Cup	2014-15
Germany	1. FC Magdeburg	3. Liga (third tier)	Saxony-Anhalt Cup	2017-18, 2021-22
Germany	1. FC Saarbrücken	Regionalliga West/Südwest (third tier)	Saarland Cup	1999–2000
Germany	Alemannia Aachen	Regionalliga West (second tier)	West German Cup	1966–67
Germany	Alemannia Aachen	Regionalliga West (fourth tier)	Middle Rhine Cup	2023–24
Germany	Borussia Neunkirchen	Amateurliga Saarland (third tier)	Saarland Cup	1977–78
Germany	Carl Zeiss Jena	Regionalliga Nordost (third tier)	Thuringian Cup	1995
Germany	Hertha BSC	Regionalliga Berlin (second tier)	Berlin Cup	1965–66, 1966–67
Germany	Hertha BSC	Amateur-Oberliga Berlin (third tier)	Berlin Cup	1986–87
Germany	Darmstadt 98	Hessenliga (fourth tier)	Hesse Cup	1998–99, 2003–04
Germany	Eintracht Braunschweig	3. Liga (third tier)	Lower Saxony Cup	2010–11
Germany	Holstein Kiel	Oberliga Nord (fourth tier)	Schleswig-Holstein Cup	2007–08
Germany	Karlsruher SC	3. Liga (third tier)	North Baden Cup	2012–13
Germany	Rot-Weiss Essen	Regionalliga Nord (third tier)	Lower Rhine Cup	2003–04
Germany	SC Freiburg	Amateurliga Südbaden (third tier)	South Baden Cup	1977–78
Germany	FC Augsburg	Bayernliga (third tier)	Schwaben Cup	1979–80
Germany	FC Augsburg	Bayernliga (fourth tier)	Schwaben Cup	2001–02
Germany	St. Pauli	Oberliga Nord (fourth tier)	Hamburg Cup	1985–86
Germany	FK Pirmasens	Oberliga Südwest (fourth tier)	South West Cup	1998–99, 2005–06
Germany	Tennis Borussia Berlin	Regionalliga Berlin (second tier)	Berlin Cup	1964–65
Germany	Tennis Borussia Berlin	Amateur-Oberliga Berlin (third tier)	Berlin Cup	1984–85
Germany	Tennis Borussia Berlin	NOFV-Oberliga Nord (third tier)	Berlin Cup	1992–93
Germany	Tennis Borussia Berlin	Regionalliga Nordost (third tier)	Berlin Cup	1995–96, 1997–98
Germany	Wuppertaler SV	Oberliga Nordrhein	Lower Rhine Cup	1999–2000
Greece	AEL	Gamma Ethniki (third tier)	Gamma Ethniki Cup	2013-14 (Note: Also won the Amateurs' Super Cup.)
Italy	Cagliari	Serie C1 (third tier)	Coppa Italia Serie C	1988–89
Italy	Como	Serie D (fifth tier)	Coppa Italia Serie D	2007–08
Italy	Gallipoli	Serie C2 (fourth tier)	Coppa Italia Serie C	2005–06
Italy	Leece	Serie C (third tier)	Coppa Italia Serie C	1975–76
Italy	Palermo	Serie C1 (third tier)	Coppa Italia Serie C	1992–93
Italy	Pinetto	Serie D (fourth tier)	Coppa Italia Serie D	2022–23
Italy	Sorrento	Serie D (fifth tier)	Coppa Italia Serie D	2005–06
Italy	Spezia	Lega Pro Prima Divisione (third tier)	Coppa Italia Lega Pro	2011–12 (Note: Also won the Supercoppa di Serie C.)
Italy	Spezia	IV Serie (fourth tier)	Coppa Ottorino Mattei	1957–58 (Note: Also won the Scudetto Serie D.)
Italy	Udinese	Serie C (third tier)	Coppa Italia Serie C	1977–78
Montenegro	Arsenal Tivat	Montenegrin Third League (third tier)	Southern Region Cup	2011–12, 2016-17
Montenegro	Iskra Danilovgrad	Montenegrin Republic League (third tier)	Montenegrin Republic Cup	1993–94
Montenegro	Kom	Montenegrin Republic League (third tier)	Montenegrin Republic Cup	1991–92
Montenegro	Lovćen	Montenegrin Republic League (third tier)	Montenegrin Republic Cup	1984–85
Montenegro	Mladost DG	Montenegrin Third League (third tier)	Central Region Cup	2019–20
Montenegro	Mogren	Montenegrin Republic League (third tier)	Montenegrin Republic Cup	1980–81
Montenegro	Mornar Bar	Montenegrin Republic League (third tier)	Montenegrin Republic Cup	1994–95
Montenegro	Podgorica	Montenegrin Third League (third tier)	Central Region Cup	2016–17
Montenegro	Rudar Pljevlja	Second League of Serbia and Montenegro (second tier)	Montenegrin Republic Cup	2000–01
Montenegro	Zeta	Second League of Serbia and Montenegro (second tier)	Montenegrin Republic Cup	1999–2000
Northern Ireland	Armagh City	Irish First Division (second tier)	Bob Radcliffe Cup	2004-05
Northern Ireland	Armagh City	NIFL Championship 2 (third tier)	Bob Radcliffe Cup	2013-14
Northern Ireland	Ballyclare Comrades	Irish League B Division (second tier)	Irish Intermediate Cup	1960–61, 1962–63
Northern Ireland	Ballyclare Comrades	Irish League B Division Section 1 (second tier)	B Division Knockout Cup	1988–89
Northern Ireland	Brantwood	Irish Intermediate League (second tier)	Steel & Sons Cup	1920-21
Northern Ireland	Brantwood	Irish Intermediate League (second tier)	Irish Intermediate Cup	1951-52
Northern Ireland	Carrick Rangers	Irish League B Division (second tier)	Steel & Sons Cup	1961-62
Northern Ireland	Carrick Rangers	IFA Championship (second tier)	Irish Intermediate Cup	2010–11
Northern Ireland	Carrick Rangers	NIFL Championship (second tier)	Irish Intermediate Cup	2014–15
Northern Ireland	Crusaders	Irish Intermediate League (second tier)	Irish Intermediate Cup	1926–27, 1937–38, 1938–39
Northern Ireland	Crusaders	Irish First Division (second tier)	IFA Intermediate League Cup	2005–06
Northern Ireland	Donegal Celtic	Northern Ireland Intermediate League (fourth tier)	Northern Ireland Intermediate League Cup	1989-90, 1998-99, 1999-00, 2001-02
Northern Ireland	Donegal Celtic	Northern Ireland Intermediate League (fourth tier)	Northern Ireland Intermediate League Challenge Cup	1992-93, 1994-95
Northern Ireland	Dungannon Swifts	Irish League B Division Section 1 (second tier)	Mid-Ulster Cup	1975-76
Northern Ireland	Dundela	Irish Intermediate League (second tier)	Irish Intermediate Cup	1946–47
Northern Ireland	Dundela	Irish League Second Division (third tier)	Irish Intermediate Cup	1999–00, 2000–01
Northern Ireland	Dundela	Irish League B Division Section 1 (second tier)	B Division Knockout Cup	1987–88, 1990–91, 1991–92
Northern Ireland	Harland & Wolff Welders	IFA Interim Intermediate League (third tier)	IFA Interim Intermediate League Cup	2008-09
Northern Ireland	Harland & Wolff Welders	IFA Championship 2 (third tier)	Championship 2 League Cup	2009–10
Northern Ireland	Institute	Irish First Division (second tier)	IFA Intermediate League Cup	2006–07
Northern Ireland	Institute	NIFL Championship (second tier)	North West Cup	2017-18
Northern Ireland	Larne	Irish League B Division (second tier)	Steel & Sons Cup	1956-57, 1964-65, 1971-72
Northern Ireland	Larne	Irish League B Division (second tier)	Irish Intermediate Cup	1969–70
Northern Ireland	Limavady United	Irish League B Division (second tier)	B Division Knockout Cup	1992-93
Northern Ireland	Limavady United	NIFL Championship 2 (third tier)	North West Cup	2015-16
Northern Ireland	Limavady United	NIFL Premier Intermediate League (third tier)	Irish Intermediate Cup	2016–17
Northern Ireland	Limavady United	NIFL Premier Intermediate League (third tier)	North West Cup	2023-24
Northern Ireland	Loughgall	Irish First Division (second tier)	Mid-Ulster Cup	2003-04
Northern Ireland	Loughgall	Irish First Division (second tier)	Irish Intermediate Cup	2007–08
Northern Ireland	Loughgall	Irish First Division (second tier)	Bob Radcliffe Cup	2009-10
Northern Ireland	Lurgan Celtic	Northern Ireland Intermediate League (fourth tier)	Bob Radcliffe Cup	2000-01
Northern Ireland	Newry City	Irish League B Division Section 1 (second tier)	Irish Intermediate Cup	1980–81
Republic of Ireland	Drogheda United	League of Ireland First Division (second tier)	League of Ireland First Division Shield	1990–91
Republic of Ireland	Galway United	League of Ireland First Division (second tier)	League of Ireland First Division Shield	1992–93
Republic of Ireland	UCD A.F.C.	League of Ireland First Division (second tier)	League of Ireland First Division Shield	1994–95
Romania	Petrolul Ploiești	Liga IV (fourth tier)	Cupa României - Prahova County Phase	2016–17
Romania	UTA Arad	Liga IV (fourth tier)	Cupa României - Arad County Phase	2013–14
Scotland	Clyde	Scottish B Division (second tier)	B Division Supplementary Cup	1951–52
Scotland	East Fife	Scottish B Division (second tier)	B Division Supplementary Cup	1947–48
Scotland	Falkirk	Scottish First Division (second tier)	Scottish Challenge Cup	1993–94, 2004–05
Scotland	Inverness Caledonian Thistle	Scottish First Division (second tier)	Scottish Challenge Cup	2003–04
Scotland	Queen of the South	Scottish Second Division (third tier)	Scottish Challenge Cup	2012–13
Scotland	Rangers	Scottish Championship (second tier)	Scottish Challenge Cup	2015–16
Scotland	Ross County	Scottish Championship (second tier)	Scottish Challenge Cup	2018–19
Scotland	St Mirren	Scottish First Division (second tier)	Scottish Challenge Cup	2005–06
Scotland	Stirling Albion	Scottish C Division (third tier)	Scottish C Division League Cup	1946–47
Slovenia	Koper	Littoral League (fourth tier)	MNZ Koper Cup	2017-18
Slovenia	Koper	Slovenian Third League (third tier)	MNZ Koper Cup	2018-19
Slovenia	Mura	Slovenian Second League (second tier)	MNZ Murska Sobota Cup	2017-18
Spain	Pontevedra	Segunda División B (third tier)	Copa Federación de España	2006–07
Spain	Real Betis	Tercera División (third tier)	Copa Federación de España	1953–54
Spain	Sevilla	Segunda División (second tier)	Campeonato Regional Sur	1928-29
Wales	Bala Town	Welsh National League (Wrexham Area) (third tier)	NEWFA Challenge Cup	2003-04
Wales	Bala Town	Cymru Alliance (second tier)	Cymru Alliance League Cup	2008–09
Wales	Barry Town	WFL Division One (second tier)	Welsh Football League Cup	1993–94
Wales	Caernarfon Town	Cymru Alliance (second tier)	Cymru Alliance League Cup	2000–01, 2015–16
Wales	Carmarthen Town	WFL Division One (second tier)	Welsh Football League Cup	1995–96
Wales	Owestry Town	Cymru Alliance (second tier)	Cymru Alliance League Cup	1995–96
Wales	Porthmadog	Cymru Alliance (second tier)	Cymru Alliance League Cup	2002–03
Wales	Ton Pentre	WFL Division One (second tier)	Welsh Football League Cup	1998-99, 2000–01

== Trans-state double ==
A Trans-state double occurs when a club wins a league and a cup which technically belong to two different countries and different associations. This usually happens as a result of a change in the political situation in the club's home country, or if the club has expatriated and is eligible to participate in the competitions of its native country and its adopted one.

Club	League Won	Cup Won	Year	Circumstance
(Austria) Rapid Wien	(Austria) Austrian Bundesliga	(Germany) Tschammerpokal	1938	Anschluss
(Austria) First Vienna	(Austria) Austrian Bundesliga	(Germany) Tschammerpokal	1943	Anschluss
(Russia) Spartak Moscow	(Russia) Russian Top League	(Soviet Union) Soviet Cup	1992	Dissolution of the Soviet Union
(Canada) Toronto FC	(United States) Major League Soccer	(Canada) Canadian Championship	2017	Canadian team in the American league system

=== Trans-state league double ===
Club	Domestic League	Secondary League	Year	Circumstance
(Austria) Rapid Wien	(Austria) Austrian Bundesliga	(Germany) German championship	1941	Anschluss

=== Trans-state cup double ===
Club	Domestic cup	Secondary cup	Year	Circumstance
(Wales) Cardiff City	(Wales) Welsh Cup	(England) FA Cup	1927	Welsh club in the English football league system
(Canada) Toronto FC	(Canada) Canadian Championship	(United States) MLS Cup	2017	Canadian team in the American league system

== Continental double ==
=== European double ===
In the same spirit as the European treble, the European double consists of winning the top tier European tournament (currently the UEFA Champions League) and domestic league title in a single season or calendar year. This has been achieved on 34 occasions by 17 clubs from 56 European competitions. Barcelona and Real Madrid has achieved this on the most occasions (5). Ajax, Real Madrid and Paris Saint-Germain are the only teams that have successfully defended a European double. José Mourinho has the unique distinction of being one of three managers to achieve this double with two different clubs, having done so with Porto (2004) and Inter Milan (2010). Likewise, career rival Pep Guardiola achieved the same feat with Barcelona (2009) and Manchester City (2023), as did Luis Enrique with Barcelona (2015) and Paris Saint-Germain (2025 and 2026). Additionally, both of Guardiola's doubles are also trebles, as Barcelona won the Copa del Rey and City won the FA Cup in their respective seasons in addition to the two trophies. Luis Enrique achieved two trebles as well, with Barcelona in 2015 and Paris Saint-Germain in 2025.

Club	Country	Number won	Year(s) won
Barcelona	Spain	5	1992, 2006, 2009*, 2011, 2015*
Real Madrid	Spain	5	1957, 1958, 2017, 2022, 2024
Bayern Munich	Germany	4	1974, 2001, 2013*, 2020*
Ajax	Netherlands	3	1972*, 1973, 1995
Inter Milan	Italy	2	1965, 2010*
Liverpool	England	2	1977, 1984
Manchester United	England	2	1999*, 2008
Paris Saint-Germain	France	2	2025*, 2026
Benfica	Portugal	1	1961
Celtic	Scotland	1	1967*
Hamburger SV	Germany	1	1983
Steaua București	Romania	1	1986
PSV Eindhoven	Netherlands	1	1988*
Red Star Belgrade	Serbia	1	1991
Milan	Italy	1	1994
Porto	Portugal	1	2004
Manchester City	England	1	2023*

- (*) as part of a treble

==== The unbeaten double ====
In 1994–95, Louis van Gaal's Ajax, with players such as Jari Litmanen, Patrick Kluivert, Marc Overmars, Finidi George, Nwankwo Kanu, Frank de Boer, Ronald de Boer, Edgar Davids, Clarence Seedorf, Winston Bogarde, Michael Reiziger and Edwin van der Sar, succeeded an unbeaten double, winning the Dutch Eredivisie with a 27–7–0 record and the UEFA Champions League with a 7–4–0 record. Van Gaal's dream team was the only club to achieve a European double with no defeats.

=== League and Europa League double ===
The UEFA Europa League (formerly the UEFA Cup), with a domestic league title win, offers the chance for a club to win a lesser European double; but arguably a more prestigious achievement than a domestic double. This has been completed on fifteen occasions.

Club	Country	Number won	Year(s) won
Liverpool	England	2	1973, 1976
IFK Göteborg	Sweden	2	1982 (part of a treble), 1987^{[g]}
Porto	Portugal	2	2003, 2011 (both part of a treble)
Feyenoord	Netherlands	1	1974
Borussia Mönchengladbach	Germany	1	1975
Juventus	Italy	1	1977
PSV Eindhoven	Netherlands	1	1978
Real Madrid	Spain	1	1986
Galatasaray	Turkey	1	2000 (part of a treble)
Valencia	Spain	1	2004
CSKA Moscow	Russia	1	2005 (part of a treble)
Zenit Saint Petersburg	Russia	1	2008

^{g} In 1987, Göteborg finished third in the Allsvenskan. At this time, the title was decided by a play-off between the top four teams. They defeated first placed Malmö FF in the play-off final.

=== League and Cup Winners' Cup double ===
Similarly, there were six occasions of clubs winning their League and the now defunct UEFA Cup Winners' Cup (CWC). No club ever won the CWC as part of a recognised treble. In the case of 1. FC Magdeburg and Dynamo Kyiv, it is also worth noting that the domestic championships they won are also now disbanded, due to German reunification and the dissolution of the Soviet Union respectively.

Club	Country	League	Number won	Year(s) won
Dynamo Kyiv	Soviet Union	Soviet Top League	2	1975, 1986
Milan	Italy	Serie A	1	1968
1. FC Magdeburg	East Germany	DDR-Oberliga	1	1974
Juventus	Italy	Serie A	1	1984
Everton	England	Division One	1	1985

=== Continental doubles outside of Europe ===
Outside Europe, the continental double might be won in a calendar year rather than a single season.

Club	Country	League	Number won	Year(s) won
Al Ahly	Egypt	Egyptian League	8	1981–82, 1986–87, 2004–05, 2005–06, 2007–08, 2019–20, 2022–23, 2023–24
Auckland City	New Zealand	NZFC Premiership, New Zealand National League	8	2005–06, 2011–12, 2013–14, 2014–15, 2015–16, 2016–17, 2022, 2024, 2025
Peñarol	Uruguay	Uruguayan Primera División	3	1960, 1961, 1982
Cruz Azul	Mexico	Mexican Primera División	3	1968–69, 1970, 1997
Hafia FC	Guinea	Guinée Championnat National	3	1972, 1975, 1977
Zamalek	Egypt	Egyptian League	3	1983–84, 1992–93, 2002–03
Santos	Brazil	Taça Brasil	2	1962, 1963
TP Mazembe	Democratic Republic of the Congo	Linafoot	2	1967, 2009
Nacional	Uruguay	Uruguayan Primera División	2	1971, 1980
Olimpia	Honduras	Liga Nacional de Fútbol de Honduras	2	1971–72, 1987–88
Defence Force	Trinidad and Tobago	National League	2	1978, 1985
Espérance Sportive de Tunis	Tunisia	Tunisian Ligue Professionnelle 1	2	1994, 2011
Raja Casablanca	Morocco	Botola	2	1996–97, 1998–99
Waitakere United	New Zealand	NZFC Premiership	2	2006–07, 2007–08
Guangzhou Evergrande	China	Chinese Super League	2	2013, 2015
Wydad Casablanca	Morocco	Botola	2	2017, 2021–22
Flamengo	Brazil	Campeonato Brasileiro Série A	2	2019, 2025
Guadalajara	Mexico	Mexican Primera División	1	1961–62
Oryx Douala	Cameroon	Elite One	1	1965
Stade d'Abidjan	Ivory Coast	Ligue 1	1	1966
Alianza	El Salvador	Salvadoran Primera División	1	1967
Toluca	Mexico	Mexican Primera División	1	1967–68
Esteghlal	Iran	Asian Club Championship	1	1970
SV Transvaal	Suriname	Hoofdklasse	1	1973
Vita Club	Zaire	Linafoot	1	1973
CARA Brazzaville	Republic of the Congo	Congo Premier League	1	1974
Municipal	Guatemala	Liga Nacional de Guatemala	1	1974
MC Alger	Algeria	Algerian Ligue Professionnelle 1	1	1975–76
Club Deportivo FAS	El Salvador	Salvadoran Primera División	1	1978–79
Olimpia	Paraguay	Paraguayan Primera División	1	1979
Canon Yaoundé	Cameroon	Elite One	1	1980
Asante Kotoko	Ghana	Ghana Premier League	1	1983
Argentinos Juniors	Argentina	Argentine Primera División	1	1985
River Plate	Argentina	Argentine Primera División	1	1985–86
Furukawa Electric	Japan	Japanese First Division	1	1986
Yomiuri	Japan	Japanese First Division	1	1987
Al-Sadd	Qatar	Qatar Stars League	1	1988–89
JS Kabylie	Algeria	Algerian Ligue Professionnelle 1	1	1989–90
Liaoning	China	Chinese Jia-A League	1	1990
Colo-Colo	Chile	Chilean Primera División	1	1991
PAS Tehran	Iran	Azadegan League	1	1992–93
Deportivo Saprissa	Costa Rica	Primera División de Costa Rica	1	1994–95
Ilhwa Chunma	South Korea	K League	1	1995
ASEC Mimosas	Ivory Coast	Ligue 1	1	1998
Júbilo Iwata	Japan	J1 League	1	1999
South Melbourne FC	Australia	National Soccer League	1	1999
Hearts of Oak	Ghana	Ghana Premier League	1	2000
Boca Juniors	Argentina	Argentine Primera División	1	2000–01
Wollongong	Australia	National Soccer League	1	2000–01
Al Ain	United Arab Emirates	UAE Football League	1	2002–03
Enyimba	Nigeria	Nigeria Premier League	1	2003
Pachuca	Mexico	Mexican Primera División	1	2007
Étoile du Sahel	Tunisia	Tunisian Ligue Professionnelle 1	1	2007
Hekari United	Papua New Guinea	Papua New Guinea National Soccer League	1	2009–10
Mamelodi Sundowns	South Africa	Premiership	1	2015–16
Central Coast Mariners	Australia	A-League Men	1	2023–24
Botafogo	Brazil	Campeonato Brasileiro Série A	1	2024
Auckland FC	Australia	A-League Men	1	2026

== Cup double ==
There are various possible combinations of winning two knock-out competitions.

=== Domestic cup double ===
A domestic cup double consists of winning both domestic cup competitions in a single season or calendar year (for seasons when this double was won in conjunction with the league title, see domestic treble). Examples include:

Club	Country	Number won	Association Cup	Secondary Cup	Year(s) won	Notes
Rangers	Scotland	11	Scottish Cup	Scottish League Cup	1949, 1962, 1964, 1976, 1978, 1979, 1993, 1999, 2002, 2003, 2008	In 1976 as part of a domestic quadruple with the Scottish League and the Glasgow Cup; in 1949, 1964, 1978, 1993, 1999 and 2003 as part of a domestic treble with the Scottish League
Kaizer Chiefs	South Africa	10	Nedbank Cup	Telkom Knockout	1984	As part of a domestic treble with the NPSL
Kaizer Chiefs	South Africa	10	Nedbank Cup	MTN 8	1976, 1977, 1981, 1982, 1987, 1992, 2006	In 1976, 1977, 1981 and 1992 as part of a domestic treble with the NPSL
Kaizer Chiefs	South Africa	10	Telkom Knockout	MTN 8	1989, 2001	In 1989 as part of a domestic treble with the NSL
Celtic	Scotland	9	Scottish Cup	Scottish League Cup	1967, 1969, 1975, 2001, 2017, 2018, 2019, 2020, 2023	In 1967 as part of the quintuple with the European Cup, Scottish League and the Glasgow Cup; in 1969, 2001, 2017, 2018, 2019, 2020, 2023 as part of a domestic treble with the Scottish League
Shamrock Rovers	Republic of Ireland	9	FAI Cup	League of Ireland Shield	1925, 1932, 1933, 1955, 1956, 1964, 1965, 1966, 1968	In 1925, 1932 and 1964 as part of a domestic treble with the League of Ireland
South China	Hong Kong	9	Hong Kong Senior Challenge Shield	Hong Kong FA Cup	1988, 1991, 1996, 1999, 2002, 2007	In 1988 and 1991 as part of a domestic quadruple with the Hong Kong First Division League and the Viceroy Cup; in 2002 as part of a domestic treble with the Hong Kong League Cup; in 2007 as part of a domestic treble with the Hong Kong First Division League
South China	Hong Kong	9	Hong Kong Senior Challenge Shield	Viceroy Cup	1972	As part of a domestic treble with the Hong Kong First Division League
South China	Hong Kong	9	Hong Kong FA Cup	Viceroy Cup	1987	As part of a domestic treble with the Hong Kong First Division League
South China	Hong Kong	9	Hong Kong FA Cup	Hong Kong League Cup	2011	
Seiko	Hong Kong	8	Hong Kong Senior Challenge Shield	Hong Kong FA Cup	1976, 1980, 1981	In 1980 and 1981 as part of a domestic treble with the Hong Kong First Division League
Seiko	Hong Kong	8	Hong Kong Senior Challenge Shield	Viceroy Cup	1973, 1979, 1985	As part of a domestic treble with the Hong Kong First Division League
Seiko	Hong Kong	8	Hong Kong FA Cup	Viceroy Cup	1978, 1986	
Paris Saint-Germain	France	7	Coupe de France	Coupe de la Ligue	1995, 1998, 2015, 2016, 2017, 2018, 2020	In 2015, 2016, 2018 and 2020 as part of a domestic treble with the Ligue 1
Kitchee	Hong Kong	6	Hong Kong Senior Challenge Shield	Hong Kong FA Cup	2017, 2019, 2023	In 2017 as part of a domestic treble with the Hong Kong First Division League
Kitchee	Hong Kong	6	Hong Kong Senior Challenge Shield	Hong Kong League Cup	2006	
Kitchee	Hong Kong	6	Hong Kong FA Cup	Hong Kong League Cup	2012, 2015	As part of a domestic treble with the Hong Kong First Division League
Linfield	Northern Ireland	4	Irish Cup	Irish League Cup	1994, 2002, 2006, 2008	In 1994, 2006 and 2008 as part of a domestic treble with the Irish Premier League
Buriram United	Thailand	4	Thai FA Cup	Thai League Cup	2011, 2012, 2013, 2015	In 2011, 2013 and 2015 as part of a domestic treble with the Thai Premier League
Eastern	Hong Kong	4	Hong Kong FA Cup	Hong Kong Senior Challenge Shield	1993, 1994, 2020, 2025	
Mohun Bagan	India	3	Durand Cup	Federation Cup	1978, 1982, 1994	
Sunrise SC	Mauritius	3	Mauritian Cup	Mauritian Republic Cup	1992, 1993, 1996	In 1992 and 1996 as part of a domestic treble with the Mauritian League
Orlando Pirates	South Africa	3	Nedbank Cup	Telkom Knockout	2011	As part of a domestic quadruple with the Premier Division and the MTN 8
Orlando Pirates	South Africa	3	Telkom Knockout	MTN 8	1973, 1996	
Al Ain	United Arab Emirates	3	UAE President's Cup	Federation Cup/UAE League Cup	2004, 2005, 2009	
Bulova	Hong Kong	2	Hong Kong FA Cup	Viceroy Cup	1982, 1983	
Yokohama F. Marinos	Japan	2	Emperor's Cup	Japan Soccer League Cup	1988, 1989	In 1989 as part of a domestic treble with the Japan Soccer League Division 1
Aberdeen	Scotland	2	Scottish Cup	Scottish League Cup	1986, 1990	
Hong Kong Rangers	Hong Kong	2	Hong Kong Senior Challenge Shield	Hong Kong FA Cup	1995	
Hong Kong Rangers	Hong Kong	2	Hong Kong Senior Challenge Shield	Viceroy Cup	1975	
Fire Brigade	Mauritius	2	Mauritian Cup	Mauritian Republic Cup	1991, 1995	
HJK	Finland	2	Finnish Cup	Finnish League Cup	1996, 1998	
Kashima Antlers	Japan	2	Emperor's Cup	J.League Cup	1997, 2000	In 2000 as part of a domestic treble with the J.League Division 1
Bayern Munich	Germany	2	DFB-Pokal	DFB-Ligapokal	1998, 2000	In 2000 as part of a domestic treble with the Bundesliga
ÍA	Iceland	2	Icelandic Cup	Icelandic League Cup	1996, 2003	In 1996 as part of a domestic treble with the Úrvalsdeild karla
Sun Hei	Hong Kong	2	Hong Kong Senior Challenge Shield	Hong Kong FA Cup	2005	As part of a domestic quadruple with the Hong Kong First Division League and the Hong Kong League Cup
Sun Hei	Hong Kong	2	Hong Kong FA Cup	Hong Kong League Cup	2003	
Derry City	Republic of Ireland	2	FAI Cup	League of Ireland Cup	1989, 2006	In 1989 as part of a domestic treble with the Irish Premier League
Mamelodi Sundowns	South Africa	2	Nedbank Cup	Telkom Knockout	2015	
Mamelodi Sundowns	South Africa	2	Telkom Knockout	MTN 8	1990	
The New Saints	Wales	2	Welsh Cup	Welsh League Cup	2015, 2016	As part of a domestic treble with the Welsh Premier League
Albirex Niigata Singapore	Singapore	2	Singapore Cup	Singapore League Cup	2015, 2016	As part of a domestic treble with the S.League
Maccabi Tel Aviv	Israel	2	Israel State Cup	Toto Cup	2015, 2021	In 2015 as part of a domestic treble with the Israeli Premier League
Shabab Al Ahli	United Arab Emirates	2	UAE President's Cup	UAE League Cup	2019, 2021	
Liverpool	England	2	FA Cup	Football League Cup	2001, 2022	In 2001 as part of a treble with the UEFA Cup; in 2022 beat Chelsea in both finals
Manchester City	England	2	FA Cup	EFL Cup	2019, 2026	In 2019 as part of a domestic treble with the Premier League
Bohemians	Republic of Ireland	1	FAI Cup	League of Ireland Shield	1928	As part of a domestic treble with the Irish Premier League
Waterford United	Republic of Ireland	1	FAI Cup	League of Ireland Shield	1937	
Drumcondra	Republic of Ireland	1	FAI Cup	League of Ireland Shield	1946	
Cork Hibernians	Republic of Ireland	1	FAI Cup	League of Ireland Shield	1973	
Urawa Red Diamonds	Japan	1	Emperor's Cup	Japan Soccer League Cup	1978	As part of a domestic treble with the Japan Soccer League Division 1
Servette	Switzerland	1	Swiss Cup	Swiss League Cup	1979	As part of a domestic treble with the Nationalliga A
Dundalk	Republic of Ireland	1	FAI Cup	League of Ireland Cup	1981	
Barcelona	Spain	1	Copa del Rey	Copa de la Liga	1983	Beat Real Madrid in both finals
Dnipro	Soviet Union	1	Soviet Cup	Federation Cup	1989	
Double Flower	Hong Kong	1	Hong Kong FA Cup	Viceroy Cup	1989	
Sea Bee	Hong Kong	1	Hong Kong FA Cup	Viceroy Cup	1992	
Arsenal	England	1	FA Cup	Football League Cup	1993	Beat Sheffield Wednesday in both finals
Bangor	Northern Ireland	1	Irish Cup	Irish League Cup	1993	
Bidvest Wits	South Africa	1	Telkom Knockout	MTN 8	1995	
Shelbourne	Republic of Ireland	1	FAI Cup	League of Ireland Cup	1996	
JCT	India	1	Durand Cup	Federation Cup	1996	
Barry Town	Wales	1	Welsh Cup	Welsh League Cup	1997	As part of a domestic treble with the Welsh Premier League
Al-Quwa Al-Jawiya	Iraq	1	Iraq FA Cup	Baghdad Championship	1997	As part of a domestic quadruple with the Iraqi Premier League and Iraqi Super Cup
Al-Zawraa	Iraq	1	Iraq FA Cup	Baghdad Championship	2000	As part of a domestic quadruple with the Iraqi Super Cup and Iraqi Premier League
Melbourne Victory	Australia	1	A-League Championship	A-League Pre-Season Challenge Cup	2008–09	As part of a domestic treble
Glentoran	Northern Ireland	1	Irish Cup	Irish League Cup	2001	
Longford Town	Republic of Ireland	1	FAI Cup	League of Ireland Cup	2004	
Rhyl	Wales	1	Welsh Cup	Welsh League Cup	2004	As part of a domestic treble with the Welsh Premier League
Happy Valley	Hong Kong	1	Hong Kong Senior Challenge Shield	Hong Kong FA Cup	2004	
Brøndby	Denmark	1	Danish Cup	Danish League Cup	2005	As part of a domestic treble with the Danish Superliga
AS Port-Louis 2000	Mauritius	1	Mauritian Cup	Mauritian Republic Cup	2005	As part of a domestic treble with the Mauritian League
Chelsea	England	1	FA Cup	Football League Cup	2007	Finals in different stadiums (Millennium Stadium/Wembley Stadium)
Dyskobolia	Poland	1	Polish Cup	Ekstraklasa Cup	2007	
FH	Iceland	1	Icelandic Cup	Icelandic League Cup	2007	
Curepipe	Mauritius	1	Mauritian Cup	Mauritian Republic Cup	2008	As part of a domestic treble with the Mauritian League
Debrecen	Hungary	1	Magyar Kupa	Ligakupa	2010	As part of a domestic treble with the Nemzeti Bajnokság I
Sligo Rovers	Republic of Ireland	1	FAI Cup	League of Ireland Cup	2010	
KR	Iceland	1	Icelandic Cup	Icelandic League Cup	2012	
Caledonia AIA	Trinidad and Tobago	1	Trinidad and Tobago Cup	Trinidad and Tobago League Cup	2012	
Platinum Stars	South Africa	1	Telkom Knockout	MTN 8	2013	
Lincoln	Gibraltar	1	Rock Cup	Gibraltar Premier Cup	2014	As part of a domestic treble with the Gibraltar Premier Division
Benfica	Portugal	1	Taça de Portugal	Taça da Liga	2014	As part of a domestic treble with the Primeira Liga
Gamba Osaka	Japan	1	Emperor's Cup	J.League Cup	2014	As part of a domestic treble with the J.League Division 1
Steaua București	Romania	1	Cupa României	Cupa Ligii	2015	As part of a domestic treble with the Liga I
Ferencváros	Hungary	1	Magyar Kupa	Ligakupa	2015	
Al Nasr	United Arab Emirates	1	UAE President's Cup	UAE League Cup	2015	
Cerezo Osaka	Japan	1	Emperor's Cup	J.League Cup	2017	
Chiangrai United	Thailand	1	Thai FA Cup	Thai League Cup	2018	
Sporting CP	Portugal	1	Taça de Portugal	Taça da Liga	2019	
St Johnstone	Scotland	1	Scottish Cup	Scottish League Cup	2021	
Porto	Portugal	1	Taça de Portugal	Taça da Liga	2023	
Sharjah	United Arab Emirates	1	UAE President's Cup	UAE League Cup	2023	

=== European cup double ===
There have been several occasions when a club has won its association's cup or league cup and a UEFA trophy but not its League title. For European cup doubles won in conjunction with the league title, see the treble.

Club	Country	Number won	Domestic cup(s) won	UEFA trophy	Year(s) won
Liverpool	England	3	Football League Cup	European Cup	1981
Liverpool	England	3	Football League Cup	European Cup	1984
Liverpool	England	3	FA Cup and Football League Cup	UEFA Cup	2001^{[L]}
Ajax	Netherlands	2	KNVB Cup	European Cup	1971
Ajax	Netherlands	2	KNVB Cup	Cup Winners' Cup	1987
Milan	Italy	2	Coppa Italia	Cup Winners' Cup	1973
Milan	Italy	2	Coppa Italia	Champions League	2003
Real Madrid	Spain	2	Copa de la Liga	UEFA Cup	1985
Real Madrid	Spain	2	Copa del Rey	Champions League	2014
Chelsea	England	2	Football League Cup	Cup Winners' Cup	1998
Chelsea	England	2	FA Cup	Champions League	2012
Fiorentina	Italy	1	Coppa Italia	Cup Winners' Cup	1961
Benfica	Portugal	1	Taça de Portugal	European Cup	1962
Bayern Munich	Germany	1	DFB-Pokal	Cup Winners' Cup	1967
Manchester City	England	1	Football League Cup	Cup Winners' Cup	1970
Anderlecht	Belgium	1	Belgian Cup	Cup Winners' Cup	1978
Nottingham Forest	England	1	Football League Cup	European Cup	1979
Aberdeen	Scotland	1	Scottish Cup	Cup Winners' Cup	1983
Juventus	Italy	1	Coppa Italia	UEFA Cup	1990
Barcelona	Spain	1	Copa del Rey	Cup Winners' Cup	1997
Parma	Italy	1	Coppa Italia	UEFA Cup	1999
Sevilla	Spain	1	Copa del Rey	UEFA Cup	2007
Manchester United	England	1	EFL Cup	Europa League	2017

^{L} A unique cup treble.

=== Continental cup doubles outside of Europe ===
Club	Country	Number won	Domestic cup(s) won	Continental trophy	Year(s) won
Zamalek	Egypt	1	Egypt Cup	CAF Confederation Cup	2019
Palmeiras	Brazil	1	Copa do Brasil	Copa Libertadores	2020
Flamengo	Brazil	1	Copa do Brasil	Copa Libertadores	2022
Gamba Osaka	Japan	1	Emperor's Cup	AFC Champions League	2008
USM Alger	Algeria	1	Algerian Cup	CAF Confederation Cup	2025–26

== Other ==
A combination of domestic league or cup and a lesser domestic or continental trophy may be won in the same season. Examples include (this list does not include doubles achieved as part of a treble):

=== UEFA ===
- Barcelona won La Liga and the Inter-Cities Fairs Cup in 1959–60, and the UEFA Cup Winners Cup and Copa del Rey in 1996–97.
- Zaragoza won an Inter-Cities Fairs Cup and Copa del Rey double in the 1963–64 season.
- Leeds United were the first English team to win a double involving European and domestic trophies. It was in 1968 when Leeds won the Football League Cup and Inter-Cities Fairs Cup.
- Manchester City won the UEFA Cup Winners Cup and Football League Cup in 1969–70.
- Nottingham Forest won the European Cup and Football League Cup in 1978–79, and the Football League Cup and Full Members' Cup in 1988–89.
- Aberdeen won the UEFA Cup Winners Cup and Scottish Cup in 1982–83.
- Real Madrid won the UEFA Cup and Copa de la Liga in 1984–85.
- Dinamo Tbilisi won the Georgian Cup and CIS Cup in 2004.
- Espanyol won the Copa del Rey and Copa Catalunya in 2006. This would not normally be counted as a domestic cup double comparable to those mentioned above, as the latter competition is not nationwide or league-wide.
- Copenhagen won the Danish Superliga and the pan-Scandinavian Royal League in 2006.
- Sevilla won the UEFA Cup and Copa del Rey in 2006–07.
- FBK Kaunas won the Lithuanian Football Cup and Baltic League in 2008.
- Chelsea won the UEFA Champions League and FA Cup in 2011–12
- Manchester United won the UEFA Europa League and EFL Cup in 2016–17.

=== AFC ===
- Al-Quwa Al-Jawiya won the Iraq FA Cup and AFC Cup in 2016.
- Al-Quwa Al-Jawiya won the Iraqi Premier League and AFC Cup in 2017.
- Mumbai City won the ISL League Shield and ISL Cup in the 2020–21 season.
- Mohun Bagan won the Durand Cup and ISL League Shield in the 2023–24 season.
- Mohun Bagan won the ISL League Shield and ISL Cup in the 2024–25 season.

== International double ==
A national team's continental championship is not held in the same year as the FIFA World Cup (although the Africa Cup of Nations was held in the same year as the World Cup up until 2010). A team which wins both titles consecutively is said to have "done the double".

=== World and continental champions ===
- Uruguay won the gold medal at the 1924 Summer Olympics and the 1924 South American Championship. (Prior to the FIFA World Cup's foundation in 1930, the Olympic champions were considered to be the world champions).
- West Germany won UEFA Euro 1972 and the 1974 FIFA World Cup
- France won the 1998 FIFA World Cup and UEFA Euro 2000
- Brazil won the 2002 FIFA World Cup and the 2004 Copa América
- Spain won UEFA Euro 2008, the 2010 FIFA World Cup, and UEFA Euro 2012
- Argentina won the 2021 Copa América, the 2022 FIFA World Cup and the 2024 Copa América
- Spain won UEFA Euro 2024 and the 2026 FIFA World Cup

=== The International 'Treble' ===
Only two teams in history have gone on to win three consecutive major international trophies.

- Spain, by winning UEFA Euro 2012, became the first team in history to win three major titles consecutively, having previously won UEFA Euro 2008, and the 2010 FIFA World Cup
- Argentina won the 2021 Copa América, the 2022 FIFA World Cup, and the 2024 Copa América to become the first South American team to win three international titles in a row.

=== World and other tournament champions ===
- Italy won the 1933–35 Central European International Cup and the 1934 FIFA World Cup
- Brazil won the 1956 Panamerican Championship and the 1958 FIFA World Cup
- England won the 1965–66 British Home Championship and the 1966 FIFA World Cup
- Germany won the 2014 FIFA World Cup and the 2017 FIFA Confederations Cup
- France won the 2018 FIFA World Cup and the 2020–21 UEFA Nations League
- Germany won 2003 FIFA Women's World Cup and the UEFA Women's Euro 2005. They repeated again when they won 2007 FIFA Women's World Cup and the UEFA Women's Euro 2009
- Spain won 2023 FIFA Women's World Cup and the 2023–24 UEFA Women's Nations League

=== Continental and other tournament champions ===
- Iran won the 1970 RCD Cup and the 1972 AFC Asian Cup
- Ghana won the 1982 African Cup of Nations, 1982 West African Nations Cup, and 1983 West African Nations Cup
- Denmark won the 1981–85 Nordic Football Championship and UEFA Euro 1992. (The Nordic Football Championship was not played between 1985 and 2001, so Denmark were still the holders.)
- Ivory Coast won the 1991 CEDEAO Cup, and the 1992 African Cup of Nations
- Argentina won the 1991 Copa América, the 1992 King Fahd Cup and the 1993 Copa América
- Saudi Arabia won the 1996 AFC Asian Cup and the 1998 Arab Nations Cup
- Brazil won the 1997 Copa América and the 1997 FIFA Confederations Cup
- Mexico won the 1998 CONCACAF Gold Cup and the 1999 FIFA Confederations Cup
- Cameroon won the 2000 African Cup of Nations, the 2002 African Cup of Nations, and the 2003 CEMAC Cup
- Iraq won the 2005 West Asian Games and the 2007 AFC Asian Cup
- Brazil won the 2007 Copa América and the 2009 FIFA Confederations Cup
- Japan won the 2011 AFC Asian Cup and the 2013 EAFF East Asian Cup
- Portugal won UEFA Euro 2016 and the 2018–19 UEFA Nations League
- Senegal won the 2019 WAFU Cup of Nations and the 2021 Africa Cup of Nations
- United States won the 2019–20 CONCACAF Nations League and the 2021 CONCACAF Gold Cup
- Algeria won the 2019 Africa Cup of Nations and the 2021 FIFA Arab Cup
- Spain won the 2022–23 UEFA Nations League and UEFA Euro 2024
- Mexico won the 2024–25 CONCACAF Nations League and the 2025 CONCACAF Gold Cup

== Total number of doubles ==
- Note: this list includes clubs that have achieved the Double at least ten times.

Club	Nation	Number of doubles	Last double (season)
Linfield	Northern Ireland	25	2020–21
Celtic	Scotland	22	2025–26
Olympiacos	Greece	19	2024–25
Lincoln Red Imps	Gibraltar	19	2025–26
Rangers	Scotland	18	2008–09
Red Star Belgrade	Serbia	16	2025–26
Al-Muharraq	Bahrain	15	2010–11
Al Ahly	Egypt	15	2019–20
Bayern Munich	Germany	14	2025–26
Dinamo Zagreb	Croatia	14	2025–26
Levski Sofia	Bulgaria	13	2006–07
HB	Faroe Islands	13	2020
Dynamo Kyiv	Ukraine	13	2020–21
Djoliba	Mali	12	2021–22
Central Sport	Tahiti	11	1983
CSKA Sofia	Bulgaria	11	1996–97
Benfica	Portugal	11	2016–17
Al-Merrikh	Sudan	11	2018
Al-Faisaly Amman	Jordan	11	2018–19
Al Ansar	Lebanon	11	2020–21
Austria Wien	Austria	10	2005–06
Dinamo Tbilisi	Georgia	10	2015–16
Rosenborg	Norway	10	2018
Mimosas	Ivory Coast	10	2023

== Double winning managers ==
- As manager of Preston North End in 1888–89, William Sudell won the inaugural First Division title, going unbeaten in the league (22 games), and won the FA Cup without conceding a goal in that competition.
- Jock Stein won the double on nine occasions with Celtic between 1967 and 1977: four doubles of the Scottish league championship and the Scottish Cup, three doubles of the Scottish league championship and the Scottish League Cup and two Trebles.
- Sir Alex Ferguson won the double on four occasions; with Aberdeen in 1983–84, and with Manchester United in 1993–94, 1995–96 and 1998–99. This achievement makes him the only manager to win the double on both sides of the Anglo-Scottish border.
- Two managers won the domestic double in three different countries:
  - Sven-Göran Eriksson, in Sweden, Portugal and Italy with IFK Göteborg (1981–82), Benfica (1982–83) and Lazio (1999–2000) respectively. This included back-to-back double wins in separate countries.
  - Pep Guardiola, in Spain, Germany and England with Barcelona (2008–09), Bayern Munich (2013–14 and 2015–16) and Manchester City (2018–19 and 2022–23)
- Louis van Gaal won the double with Barcelona in 1997–98 and Bayern Munich in 2009–10, subsequent to his undefeated European Double with Ajax in 1994–95.
- Massimiliano Allegri became the first manager in Italy to win the double four consecutive times, in 2014–15, 2015–16, 2016–17 and 2017–18, all with Juventus.

== See also ==
- The Treble
- List of association football teams to have won four or more trophies in one season
- List of football clubs by competitive honours won
