= List of football clubs in the Turks and Caicos Islands =

This is a list of football (soccer) clubs in the Turks and Caicos Islands.

- AFC Academy
- AFC National
- Beaches FC
- Caribbean All Stars FC
- Celtic FC Providenciales
- Cheshire Hall
- Cost Right FC
- Digi FC
- HAB FC
- KPMG United FC
- Masters FC
- Pedagogue FC
- Provo Haitian Stars FC
- Provopool FC
- PWC Athletic
- RMC Master Hammer FC
- SWA Sharks FC
- Tropic All Stars
