= Turks and Caicos FA Cup =

- Region: Turks and Caicos Islands
- Teams: 7

The Turks and Caicos FA Cup is an association football cup tournament held for domestic league clubs in the Turks and Caicos Islands. It is overseen by Turks and Caicos Islands Football Association. There are seven teams that compete in the cup competition every season.

== All finals ==
Information taken from RSSSF.

=== FA Cup ===
Year	Winner	Score	Runner-up
2000	Masters	2–0	Beaches
2001	Competition won by Grand Turk		
2002-03	Carribean All Stars	3–2	Master Hammer

=== Fidelity Cup ===
Year	Winner	Score	Runner-up
2003-04	Police	4–3 (a.e.t.)	KPMG United

=== FA Cup ===
Year	Winner	Score	Runner-up
2005-06	Provopool	1–0	Beaches

=== President's Cup ===
Year	Winner	Score	Runner-up
2006-07	not known		
2008	not known		
2009	OHS Express	1–0	Digi
2010	Provopool	4–0	SWA Sharks
2011	AFC National	4–2	SWA Sharks
2012	Cheshire Hall	4–2	Pedagogue
2013	Rozo	4–1	AFC Academy
2014	Cheshire Hall	1–0	AFC Academy

=== CMBS Cup ===
Year	Winner	Score	Runner-up
2015	Cheshire Hall	6–2	SWA Sharks

=== Turks Head Cup ===
Year	Winner	Score	Runner-
2016	AFC Academy	5–2	Beaches
2017	Full Physic	3–0	AFC Academy
2018	not played		
2019	Academy Jaguars	4–3	Beaches
2020	not played		
2021	SWA Sharks	3–0	Beaches
2022	not played		

=== PPL Cup ===
Year	Winner	Score	Runner-up
2023	Academy Eagles	3–2	SWA Sharks
2024	SWA Sharks	1–1 (a.e.t.) (4–3 p)	Academy Eagles
2025	SWA Sharks	4–1	Provo United
2026	SWA Sharks	4–1	Cheshire Hall
