= 2025–26 Provo Premier League =

Football league season

- Season: 2025-26
- Dates: 1 November 2025 - March 2026
- Matches: 85

The 2025–26 Provo Premier League season will be the twenty-eighth league season of the Provo Premier League, the top division football competition in the Turks and Caicos Islands. The league will begin the 2025-26 season in November 2025.

The apertura will begin on 1 November 2025 and end in late January 2026. The winner of the first phase of the competition will secure qualification to the CFU Club Shield and the Playoff Final if required. The clausura will begin after completion of the first phase and end in March 2026. The team that wins the second phase will also secure continental qualification and a spot in the Playoff Final if required. The league may culminate with a Playoff Final at the TCIFA National Academy stadium if two different teams win the Apertura and Clausura. Otherwise, the team that wins both phases will be named champion.

== Apertura ==
=== Table ===
Pos	Team	Pld	W	D	L	GF	GA	GD	Pts	Qualification or relegation
1	SWA Sharks (C)	7	6	1	0	48	5	+43	19	Qualify for Caribbean Shield and PPL Final
2	AFC Academy	7	6	0	1	20	3	+17	18	
3	Teachers	7	4	1	2	19	16	+3	13	
4	Cheshire Hall	7	3	1	3	21	15	+6	10	
5	Flamingo	7	2	4	1	10	10	0	10	
6	Young Strikers	7	2	0	5	11	19	−8	6	
7	Beaches	7	1	0	6	4	27	−23	3	
8	Provo United	7	0	1	6	4	42	−38	1	

Source: Global Sports Archive
(C) Champions

== Clausura ==
=== Table ===
Pos	Team	Pld	W	D	L	GF	GA	GD	Pts	Qualification or relegation
1	AFC Academy (C)	7	7	0	0	35	2	+33	21	Qualify for Caribbean Shield and PPL Final
2	SWA Sharks	7	5	1	1	28	8	+20	16	
3	Flamingo	7	5	1	1	19	13	+6	16	
4	Cheshire Hall	7	4	0	3	22	13	+9	12	
5	Young Strikers	7	3	0	4	11	15	−4	9	
6	Provo United	7	2	0	5	6	32	−26	6	
7	Beaches	7	1	0	6	9	24	−15	3	
8	Teachers	7	0	0	7	8	31	−23	0	

Source: Global Sports Archive
(C) Champions
