= 2016 Provo Premier League =

Provo Premier League
- Season: 2016
- Champions: AFC Academy
- Relegated: Rozo
- 2017 CFU Club Championship: TBD
- Matches played: 31
- Goals scored: 167 (5.39 per match)
- Top goalscorer: Raymond Burey (23 goals)
- Biggest home win: SWA 9–0 TEA (16 Feb)
- Biggest away win: TEA 0–12 SWA (26 Apr)
- Highest scoring: 12 goals: TEA 0–12 SWA (26 Apr)
- Longest losing run: 8 matches: Grand Turk United

The 2016 Provo Premier League is the sixteenth season of the top football division in the Turks and Caicos Islands. The season began on 9 January 2016.

The presence of Grand Turk United FC, based on Grand Turk, marked the first club from an island other than Providenciales to compete in the league.

== Table ==
Pos	Team	Pld	W	D	L	GF	GA	GD	Pts	Qualification or relegation
1	Academy	12	9	1	2	38	28	+10	28	CFU Club Championship second round
2	Full Physic	12	9	0	3	45	17	+28	27	CFU Club Championship first round
3	Beaches	12	8	0	4	35	29	+6	24	
4	Cheshire Hall	12	6	2	4	38	30	+8	20	
5	SWA Sharks	12	5	0	7	32	19	+13	15	
6	Teachers	12	3	1	8	25	58	−33	10	
7	Grand Turk United	12	0	0	12	8	40	−32	0	
8	Rozo (R)	0	0	0	0	0	0	0	0	Withdrew

Updated to match(es) played on 14 October 2016.
Source: https://www.rsssf.org/tablest/turkscaicos2016.html
(R) Relegated
