= 2019 Provo Premier League =

Provo Premier League
- Season: 2019

The 2019 Provo Premier League is the 19th season of the Provo Premier League, the top division football competition in the Turks and Caicos Islands. The season began on 9 February 2019.

== Teams ==
A total of six teams compete in the league. Academy Jaguars are the defending champions. Full Physic withdrew from the league, and were replaced by Flamingo

- Academy Eagles
- Academy Jaguars (defending champions)
- Beaches
- Cheshire Hall
- Flamingo (new entry)
- SWA Sharks

== Regular season ==
Pos	Team	Pld	W	D	L	GF	GA	GD	Pts	Qualification or relegation
1	Academy Jaguars (A)	10	9	1	0	35	11	+24	28	Advance to Playoffs (Semifinals)
2	Cheshire Hall (A)	10	6	1	3	31	15	+16	19	Advance to Playoffs (Semifinals)
3	Beaches (A)	10	5	0	5	21	24	−3	15	Advance to Playoffs (Quarterfinals)
4	Flamingo (A)	10	4	1	5	27	26	+1	13	Advance to Playoffs (Quarterfinals)
5	SWA Sharks (A)	10	4	0	6	19	24	−5	12	Advance to Playoffs (Quarterfinals)
6	Academy Eagles (A)	10	0	1	9	6	39	−33	1	Advance to Playoffs (Quarterfinals)

Source: Soccerway
(A) Advance to a further round

== Playoffs ==
Round 1 (22 & 25 June)
4	Flamingo	4
5	SWA Sharks	2
3	Beaches	4
6	Academy Eagles	0

Semifinals (29 June & 2 July)
1	Academy Jaguars	3
4	Flamingo	1
2	Cheshire Hall	0
3	Beaches (awd.)	3

Final (6 July)
1	Academy Jaguars	4
3	Beaches	1

== Finalists ==
Team	Location	Stadium	Capacity
AFC Academy	Providenciales	TCIFA National Academy	3,000
Beaches FC	Providenciales	TCIFA National Academy	3,000
