= 2017 Provo Premier League =

Provo Premier League
- Season: 2017
- Champions: Beaches FC
- Top goalscorer: Fred Dorvil (22 goals)

The 2017 Provo Premier League was the 17th season of the top football division in the Turks and Caicos Islands. The season began on 14 January and concluded on 20 May 2017.

== Regular season ==
Pos	Team	Pld	W	D	L	GF	GA	GD	Pts	Qualification
1	Small World United	6	4	0	2	22	11	+11	12	Champions Playoff
2	Academy	6	3	2	1	22	12	+10	11	Champions Playoff
3	Full Physic	6	3	1	2	32	13	+19	10	Champions Playoff
4	Beaches	6	3	1	2	17	12	+5	10	Champions Playoff
5	Cheshire Hall	6	2	3	1	13	10	+3	9	Plate Playoff
6	SWA Sharks	6	2	1	3	12	16	−4	7	Plate Playoff
7	Teachers	6	0	0	6	8	52	−44	0	Plate Playoff

== Champions Playoff ==
Pos	Team	Pld	W	D	L	GF	GA	GD	Pts	Qualification
1	Academy	6	4	2	0	23	4	+19	14	Championship final
2	Beaches	6	4	1	1	10	10	0	13	Championship final
3	Full Physic	6	2	1	3	15	12	+3	7	
4	Small World United	6	0	0	6	5	27	−22	0	

=== Championship final ===
Academy 4-4 Beaches [6-7 pen]

== Plate Playoff ==
Pos	Team	Pld	W	D	L	GF	GA	GD	Pts	Qualification
1	Cheshire Hall	4	4	0	0	20	6	+14	12	Plate Final
2	SWA Sharks	4	2	0	2	20	9	+11	6	Plate Final
3	Teachers	4	0	0	4	8	33	−25	0	

=== Plate Final ===
Cheshire Hall 2-1 SWA Sharks
