= 2014 Provo Premier League =

Provo Premier League
- Season: 2014
- Champions: AFC Academy
- Matches: 42
- Goals: 207 (4.93 per match)
- Biggest home win: Cheshire Hall 11−1 Trailblazers; Cheshire Hall 11−1 Rozo
- Biggest away win: Trailblazers 1−9 Cheshire Hall
- Highest scoring: Cheshire Hall 11−1 Trailblazers; Cheshire Hall 11−1 Rozo

The 2014 Provo Premier League is the 16th season of top-tier football in the Turks and Caicos Islands. It began on 18 January 2014 and will end in April 2014.

== League table ==
Pos	Team	Pld	W	D	L	GF	GA	GD	Pts
1	AFC Academy (C)	12	11	0	1	43	18	+25	33
2	Cheshire Hall	12	8	1	3	47	20	+27	25
3	Rozo	12	7	1	4	34	19	+15	22
4	SWA Sharks	12	6	1	5	23	24	−1	19
5	Beaches	12	3	2	7	22	24	−2	11
6	Trailblazers	12	2	1	9	20	58	−38	7
7	Teachers	12	1	2	9	18	44	−26	5

Updated to match(es) played on 2 May 2014. Source: Soccerway
Rules for classification: 1) points; 2) goal difference; 3) number of goals scored.
(C) Champions

== Results ==
Home \ Away	AFC	BEA	CHE	ROZO	SWA	TEA	TRA
AFC Academy		2–0	3–2	3–1	6–2	7–1	6–1
Beaches FC	2–3		0–3	2–4	0–1	1–1	2–0
Cheshire Hall	1–4	3–1		11–1	4–2	5–2	11–1
Rozo FC	2–3	4–2	2–2		3–0	1–0	3–1
SWA Sharks	4–2	0–3	1–0	2–1		2–1	1–2
Teachers FC	0–1	2–2	2–5	1–6	0–6		5–4
Trailblazers FC	2–3	1–7	1–9	1–6	2–2	4–3	

Updated to match(es) played on 2 May 2014. Source: Soccerway
Legend: Blue = home team win; Yellow = draw; Red = away team win.
