= 2021–22 Provo Premier League =

Football league season

- Season: 2021-22
- Dates: 4 September 2021 - 3 July 2022
- Champions: SWA Sharks
- CFU Club Shield: SWA Sharks
- Matches: 64
- Biggest home win: SWA Sharks 9-1 Beaches (28 May 2022)
- Biggest away win: Flamingo 1-7 Blue Hills (26 June 2022)
- Highest scoring: SWA Sharks 9-1 Beaches (28 May 2022)
- Longest unbeaten run: 11 - Blue Hills (2 October 2021 - 19 June 2022)
- Longest winless run: 17 - Flamingo (26 September 2021 - 3 July 2022)

The 2021–22 Provo Premier League season was the twenty-fourth league season of the Provo Premier League, the top division football competition in the Turks and Caicos Islands.

The SWA Sharks won the league in a playoff final over Blue Hills on 10 July 2022. The apertura began on 4 September 2021 and ended on 14 November 2021. Blue Hills won the first phase of the competition. The clausura began on 26 February 2022 and ended on 4 July 2022. SWA Sharks won the second phase of the competition.

== Teams ==
- SWA Sharks
- Blue Hills
- Teachers
- Academy Eagles
- Beaches
- Flamingo

== Apertura ==
=== Table ===
Pos	Team	Pld	W	D	L	GF	GA	GD	Pts	Qualification or relegation
1	Blue Hills (C)	10	7	1	2	26	9	+17	22	Qualify for Caribbean Shield and PPL Final
2	SWA Sharks	10	6	2	2	22	11	+11	20	
3	Beaches	10	6	0	4	29	17	+12	18	
4	Academy Eagles	10	6	0	4	20	14	+6	18	
5	Teachers	10	2	1	7	17	32	−15	7	
6	Flamingo	10	1	0	9	10	41	−31	3	

Source: Soccerway
(C) Champions

== Clausura ==
=== Table ===
Pos	Team	Pld	W	D	L	GF	GA	GD	Pts	Qualification or relegation
1	SWA Sharks (C)	10	8	1	1	35	12	+23	25	Named League Champion
2	Blue Hills	10	8	0	2	27	9	+18	24	
3	Teachers	10	4	1	5	21	17	+4	13	
4	Academy Eagles	10	3	4	3	20	17	+3	13	
5	Beaches	9	1	2	6	6	26	−20	5	
6	Flamingo	9	0	2	7	11	39	−28	2	

Source: Soccerway
(C) Champions

== Playoff Final ==
Provo Premier League Championship Final
22 March 2025
20:00 EST (UTC+02:00)
Final

Blue Hills	2–4 (a.e.t.)	SWA Sharks
none reported	Report	none reported

TCIFA National Academy Stadium, Venetian Road Settlement, Turks and Caicos Islands
Attendance: ~100
