= 2014–15 Provo Premier League =

Provo Premier League
- Season: 2014–15
- Champions: Academy
- 2016 CFU Club Championship: Academy and Beaches
- Biggest away win: Mango Reef Trailblazers 0–17 Academy

Statistics from the 2014–15 Provo Premier League:

== Table ==
Pos	Team	Pld	W	D	L	GF	GA	GD	Pts	Qualification or relegation
1	Academy (C)	10	9	0	1	31	8	+23	27	CFU Club Championship second round
2	Beaches	10	6	0	4	18	15	+3	18	CFU Club Championship first round
3	Cheshire Hall	10	4	2	4	35	27	+8	14	
4	SWA Sharks	10	3	2	5	28	24	+4	11	
5	Rozo	10	2	2	6	10	26	−16	8	
6	Teachers	10	2	2	6	19	41	−22	8	
7	Mango Reef Trailblazers	0	0	0	0	0	0	0	0	
8	Flamingo	0	0	0	0	0	0	0	0	

Updated to match(es) played on 2 May 2016.
Source: https://www.rsssf.org/tablest/turkscaicos2015.html
(C) Champions

Mango Reef Trailblazers and Flamingo withdrew during the season.
