= Fred Dorvil =

Turks and Caicos Islands football player (born 1995)

Personal information
- Date of birth: 10 December 1995 (age 30)
- Place of birth: Providenciales, Turks & Caicos Islands
- Height: 1.80 m (5 ft 11 in)
- Position: Forward

Team information
- Current team: Beaches

College career
Years	Team	Apps	(Gls)
2013	Western Texas College	5	(1)
2016	Barton Cougars		
2016–2017	Faulkner University		

Senior career*
Years	Team	Apps	(Gls)
2011–2012	AFC Academy	11	(11)
2016	Full Physic	1	(0)
2017–2018	Full Physic		
2019–	Beaches	11	(1)

International career^{‡}
2014	Turks & Caicos Islands U20		
2014–	Turks & Caicos Islands	9	(1)
- * Club domestic league appearances and goals as of 11:46, 21 August 2020 (UTC) ‡ National team caps and goals as of 11:46, 21 August 2020 (UTC)

Fred Dorvil (born 10 December 1995) is a Turks and Caicos Islands international footballer who plays as a forward for Provo Premier League side Beaches.

== College career ==
Dorvil started his career with the AFC Academy of his native Turks and Caicos Islands, where he finished the 2012 Provo Premier League joint top scorer with 11 goals. However the award officially went to Samuel Narcius of Cheshire Hall as he had scored 5 additional goals in the Presidents Cup.

Dorvil moved to America and enrolled at the Western Texas College, where he joined the college's soccer team in 2013. He played 5 games for the Texan college, scoring once in a 4-0 victory over the Kansas City Kansas Community College.

After returning to his home country to play for Full Physic, where he made one appearance, Dorvil returned to America to study at Barton Community College in Kansas. In May 2016 it was announced that Dorvil would be leaving the Cougars for Faulkner University in Montgomery. Having not been able to raise enough money to pay for tuition, Dorvil returned once more to Full Physic, and made the national newspaper when he scored 9 goals in a 17-2 thrashing of fellow Provo Premier League side Teachers FC.

== International career ==
Dorvil was called up to the Turks and Caicos Islands under 20 squad in 2014. The same year he received a call up to the senior squad, as he was selected to play in qualifying games for the 2014 Caribbean Cup. He made his debut for Turks and Caicos in a May 2014 Caribbean Cup match against Aruba.

He was also called up in 2015 for 2018 FIFA World Cup qualification. He came on as a substitute in both games, which both ended 6-2 to Saint Kitts and Nevis.

== Career statistics ==
=== International ===
As of matches played 21 March 2019.

National team	Year	Apps	Goals
Turks and Caicos Islands	2014	3	0
Turks and Caicos Islands	2015	2	0
Turks and Caicos Islands	2016	0	0
Turks and Caicos Islands	2017	0	0
Turks and Caicos Islands	2018	1	0
Turks and Caicos Islands	2019	3	1
Total		9	1

=== International goals ===
Scores and results list the Turks and Caicos Islands' goal tally first.

No.	Date	Venue	Opponent	Score	Result	Competition
1.	21 March 2019	Raymond E. Guishard Technical Centre, The Valley, Anguilla	British Virgin Islands	2–2	2–2	2019–20 CONCACAF Nations League qualification
