= 2023–24 Provo Premier League =

Football league season

- Season: 2023-24
- Dates: 29 September 2023 - 1 May 2024
- Champions: Academy Eagles
- CFU Club Shield: Academy Eagles
- Matches: 64
- Biggest home win: Academy Eagles 4-1 Flamingo (25 November 2023)
- Biggest away win: Teachers 0-7 SWA Sharks (13 April 2024)
- Highest scoring: Teachers 0-7 SWA Sharks (13 April 2024)
- Longest unbeaten run: 14 - Academy Eagles (28 October 2023 - 27 April 2024)
- Longest winless run: 8 - Teachers (13 January 2024 - 27 April 2024)

The 2023–24 Provo Premier League season was the twenty-sixth league season of the Provo Premier League, the top division football competition in the Turks and Caicos Islands. Many league games took place in front of dozens of spectators.

The Academy Eagles won the league by winning both phases of the competition. No playoff final was required to name a champion and to end the season. The apertura began on 29 September 2023 and ended on 20 January 2024. Academy Eagles won the first phase of the competition, with an unbeaten match record a +19 goal difference. The clausura began on 5 April 2024 and ended on 1 May 2025. Academy Eagles won the second phase of the competition, with an unbeaten match record a +14 goal difference.

== Teams ==
- SWA Sharks
- Teachers
- Cheshire Hall
- Flamingo (later withdrew)
- Academy Eagles

== Apertura ==
=== Table ===
Pos	Team	Pld	W	D	L	GF	GA	GD	Pts	Qualification or relegation
1	Academy Eagles (C)	8	8	0	0	25	6	+19	24	Qualify for Caribbean Shield and PPL Final
2	SWA Sharks	8	6	0	2	24	11	+13	18	
3	Teachers	8	2	0	6	8	15	−7	6	
4	Flamingo	8	2	0	6	12	22	−10	6	
5	Cheshire Hall	8	2	0	6	5	20	−15	6	

Source: Soccerway
(C) Champions

== Clausura ==
=== Table ===
Pos	Team	Pld	W	D	L	GF	GA	GD	Pts	Qualification or relegation
1	Academy Eagles (C)	6	5	1	0	18	4	+14	16	Named League Champion
2	SWA Sharks	6	4	0	2	18	9	+9	12	
3	Teachers	6	0	3	3	3	15	−12	3	
4	Cheshire Hall	6	0	2	4	2	13	−11	2	
5	Flamingo	0	0	0	0	0	0	0	0	Withdrew, record annulled

Source: Soccerway
(C) Champions
