= 2018 Provo Premier League =

Provo Premier League
- Season: 2018
- Champions: Academy Jaguars

The 2018 Provo Premier League is the 18th season of the top football division in the Turks and Caicos Islands. The season began on 13 January and concluded on 29 September 2018.

== Standings ==
Pos	Team	Pld	W	D	L	GF	GA	GD	Pts
1	Academy Jaguars	10	7	2	1	35	11	+24	23
2	Cheshire Hall	10	7	0	3	29	20	+9	21
3	SWA Sharks	10	6	1	3	41	18	+23	19
4	Full Physic	10	6	1	3	21	21	0	19
5	Beaches	10	1	0	9	13	39	−26	3
6	Academy Eagles	10	1	0	9	11	41	−30	3

Notes:

- The senior side of Academy were renamed Academy Jaguars, to distinguish them from their junior side, new entrants Academy Eagles
- Small World United and Teachers withdrew
