= 2013 Provo Premier League =

Provo Premier League
- Season: 2013
- Champions: Cheshire Hall (2nd title)
- Matches: 20
- Goals: 86 (4.3 per match)
- Biggest home win: Cheshire Hall 3–0 AFC Academy; Rozo 3–0 Teachers
- Biggest away win: Teachers 0–7 AFC Academy
- Highest scoring: AFC Academy 3–4 Rozo; SWA Sharks 4–3 AFC Academy; Teachers 0–7 AFC Academy; Teachers 1–6 Cheshire Hall; Teachers 2–5 SWA Sharks

The 2013 Provo Premier League was the 15th season of top-tier football in the Turks and Caicos Islands. It began on 2 February 2013 and ended on 6 April 2013.

== League table ==
Pos	Team	Pld	W	D	L	GF	GA	GD	Pts
1	Cheshire Hall (C)	8	7	0	1	27	7	+20	21
2	Rozo	8	6	1	1	19	11	+8	19
3	SWA Sharks	8	3	1	4	17	20	−3	10
4	AFC Academy	8	2	1	5	20	20	0	7
5	Teachers	8	0	1	7	7	32	−25	1

Updated to match(es) played on 6 April 2013. Source: Soccerway
Rules for classification: 1) points; 2) goal difference; 3) number of goals scored.
(C) Champions

== Results ==
Home \ Away	AFC	CHE	ROZO	SWA	TEA
AFC Academy		0–3	3–4	4–2	1–1
Cheshire Hall	3–0		0–1	3–1	4–2
Rozo FC	3–2	1–5		1–1	3–0
SWA Sharks	4–3	1–3	0–3		3–1
Teachers FC	0–7	1–6	0–3	2–5	

Updated to match(es) played on 6 April 2013. Source: Soccerway
Legend: Blue = home team win; Yellow = draw; Red = away team win.
