= 2024–25 Provo Premier League =

Football league season

- Season: 2024-25
- Dates: 12 December 2024 - 19 March 2025
- Champions: SWA Sharks
- CFU Club Shield: SWA Sharks
- Matches: 85
- Biggest home win: Academy Eagles 14-0 Teachers YS (1 January 2025)
- Biggest away win: Provo United 0-8 Academy Eagles (14 December 2024)
- Highest scoring: Academy Eagles 14-0 Teachers YS (1 January 2025)
- Longest unbeaten run: 9 - Academy Eagles (14 December 2024 - 15 March 2025)
- Longest winless run: 12 - Teachers YS (13 November 2024 - 12 March 2025)

The 2024–25 Provo Premier League season was the twenty-seventh league season of the Provo Premier League, the top division football competition in the Turks and Caicos Islands. The SWA Sharks FC won the league in a playoff final on 22 March 2025.

The apertura began on 9 November 2024 and ended on 25 January 2025. Academy Eagles won the first phase of the competition, with an unbeaten match record and a +32 goal difference. The clausura began on 1 February 2025 and ended on 19 March 2025. SWA Sharks FC won the second phase. The league culminated in a single-leg knockout final that SWA Sharks FC won over Academy Eagles on 22 March 2025 at the TCIFA National Academy stadium.

== Teams ==
- SWA Sharks
- Teachers
- Cheshire Hall
- Beaches
- Academy Eagles
- Teachers YS
- Provo United

== Apertura ==
=== Table ===
Pos	Team	Pld	W	D	L	GF	GA	GD	Pts	Qualification or relegation
1	Academy Eagles (C)	6	6	0	0	35	3	+32	18	Qualify for Caribbean Shield and PPL Final
2	SWA Sharks	6	5	1	0	31	8	+23	16	
3	Beaches	6	3	1	2	16	12	+4	10	
4	Teachers	6	3	0	3	17	8	+9	9	
5	Provo United	6	2	0	4	13	28	−15	6	
6	Cheshire Hall	6	1	1	4	14	16	−2	4	
7	Teachers YS	6	0	0	6	3	54	−51	0	

Source: Soccerway
(C) Champions

== Clausura ==
=== Table ===
Pos	Team	Pld	W	D	L	GF	GA	GD	Pts	Qualification or relegation
1	SWA Sharks (C)	6	5	1	0	34	8	+26	16	Qualify for Caribbean Shield and PPL Final
2	Academy Eagles	6	4	1	1	16	2	+14	13	
3	Cheshire Hall	6	3	1	2	15	16	−1	10	
4	Provo United	6	3	0	3	15	18	−3	9	
5	Teachers	6	2	2	2	16	8	+8	8	
6	Beaches	6	1	1	4	7	13	−6	4	
7	Teachers YS	6	0	0	6	4	42	−38	0	

Source: Soccerway
(C) Champions

== Playoff Final ==
Provo Premier League Championship Final
22 March 2025
20:00 EST (UTC+02:00)
Final

Academy Eagles	3–3	SWA Sharks
none reported	Report	none reported
Penalties
	4–5

TCIFA National Academy Stadium, Venetian Road Settlement, Turks and Caicos Islands
Attendance: ~100
