= Football in the Turks and Caicos Islands =

The sport of association football in the Turks and Caicos Islands is run by the Turks and Caicos Islands Football Association.

The association administers the national football team, as well as multiple league competitions in the islands. The top-level men's league is the Provo Premier League, which had seven teams in its 2024-2025 season. The islands also support youth leagues and a beach football league.

== League system ==
Level	League(s)/Division(s)
1	Provo Premier League; 7 clubs

== National football stadium ==
Stadium	Capacity	City
TCIFA National Academy	3,000	Venetian Road Settlement
