= 2022–23 Provo Premier League =

Provo Premier League
- Season: 2022–23
- Dates: 3 December 2022 - 29 April 2023
- Champions: SWA Sharks
- Caribbean Shield: SWA Sharks
- Matches: 52
- Biggest home win: Eagles 9–1 Teachers (5 April 2023)
- Biggest away win: Flamingo 1–12 Teachers (12 Nov 2022)
- Highest scoring: Flamingo 1–12 Teachers (12 Nov 2022)

The 2022-23 Provo Premier League was the twenty-fifth season of the Provo Premier League, the top division football competition in the Turks and Caicos Islands. The season began on 5 November 2022 and concluded on 29 April 2023.

SWA Sharks won both the Apertura and Clausura tournaments and were deemed the outright champions. They as a result earned a berth into the CONCACAF Caribbean Shield tournament.

== Teams ==
- SWA Sharks
- Teachers
- Beaches
- Flamingo
- Academy Eagles
- Blue Hills (later withdrew)

== Apertura ==
=== Table ===
Pos	Team	Pld	W	D	L	GF	GA	GD	Pts	Qualification or relegation
1	SWA Sharks (C)	8	6	2	0	24	6	+18	20	Qualify for Caribbean Shield and PPL Final
2	Teachers	8	3	3	2	29	20	+9	12	
3	Academy Eagles	8	2	4	2	11	9	+2	10	
4	Flamingo	8	2	1	5	14	31	−17	7	
5	Beaches	8	0	4	4	11	23	−12	4	
6	Blue Hills	0	0	0	0	0	0	0	0	Withdrew, record annulled

Source: RSSSF
(C) Champions

== Clausura ==
=== Table ===
Pos	Team	Pld	W	D	L	GF	GA	GD	Pts	Qualification or relegation
1	SWA Sharks (C)	8	5	2	1	19	8	+11	17	Qualify for Caribbean Shield and PPL Final
2	Academy Eagles	7	4	1	2	28	7	+21	13	
3	Teachers	8	3	1	4	15	18	−3	10	
4	Flamingo	8	2	2	4	12	19	−7	8	
5	Beaches	7	1	2	4	7	29	−22	5	

Source: RSSSF
(C) Champions

== PPL Final ==
The PPL Final between the Apertura and Clausura champion was to be held in May 2023. The game was canceled as SWA Sharks won both tournaments.

== Aggregate table ==
Pos	Team	Pld	W	D	L	GF	GA	GD	Pts	Qualification or relegation
1	SWA Sharks (C)	16	11	4	1	43	14	+29	37	Qualify for Caribbean Shield and PPL Final
2	Academy Eagles	15	6	5	4	39	16	+23	23	
3	Teachers	16	6	4	6	25	27	−2	22	
4	Flamingo	16	4	3	9	26	50	−24	15	
5	Beaches	15	1	6	8	18	52	−34	9	

Source: RSSSF
(C) Champions
