= Christopher Bryan =

Turks and Caicos footballer

Chris Bryan
Personal information
- Full name: Christopher Bryan
- Date of birth: 17 November 1960 (age 65)
- Place of birth: England
- Position: Centre-back

Youth career
- 1975–1977: Thameside Vikings
- 1977–1979: Green Star Petersham

Senior career*
Years	Team	Apps	(Gls)
- KPMG United
2016–2020	SWA Sharks		

International career
1999–2006	Turks & Caicos Islands	6	(2)
- * Club domestic league appearances and goals

Christopher Bryan (born 17 November 1960) is a former association football player who played as a defender for the Turks and Caicos Islands national team.

He was educated at Kingston Grammar School, Kingston-upon-Thames, England.

Between 1999 and 2006, he won six caps and scored two goals for his country. He was the first player from the Islands to score in an international fixture. After retiring from playing international football in 2006, he became the President of the Turks and Caicos Islands Football Association.

Bryan continued to play club football and in 2020, aged 59, it was recognised that he is one of only four players, in different top national leagues, older than 50 years who continue their careers and have played at least one game after turning 50.

== International career ==
Bryan was selected to play in the Turks and Caicos Islands national football team's first ever competitive international match on 24 February 1999. The game, a qualifying match for the Copa Caribe, ended in a 0–3 loss to the Bahamas in Nassau. In the team's following match two days later, Bryan became the first player from the Turks and Caicos Islands to score a goal in international football when he netted both of his side's goals in a 2–2 draw with the US Virgin Islands in Nassau.

On 18 March 2000, Bryan played in the team's 0–8 drubbing by St. Kitts and Nevis, which remains the country's biggest ever defeat. He started the match in Basseterre, but was substituted and replaced by Gregory Watts after just 54 minutes. He went on to win a total of six caps for his country. He represented his country in two World Cup qualification games. On 6 September 2006, at the age of 45, Bryan played his final match for the Turks and Caicos Islands. The team lost 2–3 to the Bahamas in Havana in their final match of the 2006–07 Caribbean Nations Cup group stage, which saw them knocked out of the competition.

In 2015, Bryan was part of the Turks & Caicos Islands national beach soccer team, playing alongside his son Alex.

=== International goals ===
Scores and results list the Turks and Caicos Islands' goal tally first.

No.	Date	Venue	Opponent	Score	Result	Competition
1	26 February 1999	Thomas Robinson Stadium, Nassau, Bahamas	U.S. Virgin Islands	–	2–2	1999 Caribbean Cup qualification
2	26 February 1999	Thomas Robinson Stadium, Nassau, Bahamas	U.S. Virgin Islands	–	2–2	1999 Caribbean Cup qualification

== After football ==
Following his retirement from international football, Bryan was made General Secretary of the Turks and Caicos Islands Football Association (TCIFA). He later succeeded Thomas Smith as President of the TCIFA. Since his appointment as President, Bryan has focused on the improvement of youth football in the Turks and Caicos Islands. In September 2008, he initiated the TCIFA Youth Development Program to encourage youngsters in the country to take up the sport. During the 2007–08 period, youth participation on the islands increased by 50% compared to the previous year. Under his presidency, the country entered a team into the FIFA U-17 World Cup qualifiers for the first time. He was succeeded by Sonia Bien-Aime in 2014.

== Managerial career ==
Bryan was named the Provo Premier League Coach of the Season after leading SWA Sharks FC to the league championship for the 2024–25 season.
