= Teachers Young Strikers FC =

Turks and Caicos football club

- Ground: TCIFA National Academy
- Capacity: 3,000
- League: Provo Premier League

Teachers Young Strikers FC is an association football club from Providenciales, Turks and Caicos that currently competes in the Provo Premier League.
