= Celtic FC Providenciales =

Association football club in Turks and Caicos

- Full name: Celtic FC Providenciales
- Ground: Turks and Caicos
- League: MFL League
Home colours

Celtic FC Providenciales is a football club of Turks and Caicos.

They play in the Turks and Caicos first division, the MFL League.

== Current squad ==
As for the 2007/2008 season Note: Flags indicate national team as defined under FIFA eligibility rules; some limited exceptions apply. Players may hold more than one non-FIFA nationality.

No.	Pos.	Nation	Player
—	GK	(Turks and Caicos Islands) TCA	Artur Maruc
—	DF	(Turks and Caicos Islands) TCA	Danny Merfy
—	DF	(Turks and Caicos Islands) TCA	Abraham Gerdmand
—	DF	(Turks and Caicos Islands) TCA	David Boyer
—	DF	(Turks and Caicos Islands) TCA	Steave McManus
—	DF	(Turks and Caicos Islands) TCA	Markus Donati
—	MF	(Turks and Caicos Islands) TCA	Ben Millar
—	MF	(Turks and Caicos Islands) TCA	Matey Unterberg

No.	Pos.	Nation	Player
—	MF	(Turks and Caicos Islands) TCA	David Hadji
—	MF	(Turks and Caicos Islands) TCA	Kreig Bellami
—	MF	(Turks and Caicos Islands) TCA	Kirton Satton
—	MF	(Turks and Caicos Islands) TCA	Steven McNamara
—	MF	(Turks and Caicos Islands) TCA	Shumad Mehmedovic
—	FW	(Turks and Caicos Islands) TCA	Darren Janoshko
—	FW	(Turks and Caicos Islands) TCA	Henrikh Lazarsson
—		(Turks and Caicos Islands) TCA	Havier-Borhes Kamara
