= Clement Howell =

Politician from the Turks and Caicos Islands

- Born: December 10, 1935; Providenciales, Turks and Caicos Islands
- Died: August 2, 1987 (aged 51); Atlantic Ocean
- Occupation: Politician
- Known for: Member of the Turks and Caicos Ministerial Government; Disappearance and presumed death

Clement Howell (December 10, 1935 – August 2, 1987) was a politician from the Turks and Caicos Islands. He served on a four-member interim advisory council beginning in July 1986, after two previous chief ministers were forced to resign and the ministerial government in the territory was suspended.

The Ministerial government resumed after elections were held in early 1988.

== Early life ==
Clement Howell was born on 10 December 1935 in Blue Hills, Providenciales, Turks and Caicos Islands to Edgar Cornelius Howell and Christiana Howell née Rigby. He was the last of six children who lived to see their adulthood.

Clement attended the Blue Hills All Age school (now the Oseta Jolly Primary) and later went on to the Turks and Caicos High School on Grand Turk (now the HJ Robinson High School). During his young adult years, he served as secretary to the District Board for Providenciales and at one point also served as chairman of the board. These areas of service to his community placed him in good a good position to become a district constable. Also, his success at high school made him a prime candidate for a post as a teacher at the Five Cays All Age School and later at the Blue Hills All Age school, where he was once a student.

== Marriage & Family ==
Howell met and married the former Ellen Amelia Jolly. She had relocated to Providenciales, when her mother, Oseta Jolly was transferred there to work as the headteacher for the Blue Hills All Age school. Their wedding took place on January 6, 1957. They had nine children.

== Life's Work ==
Clement Howell played a key role in the adjudication process which took place in 1967. He assisted with surveys and registrations and helped many of the residents of Providenciales acquire proper paperwork for their estates. From 1969 to 1970 he was successful at gaining a scholarship to pursue studies at Moray House College of Education in Edinburgh, Scotland where he read for a diploma in Primary School Administration. After completing his studies, he was appointed as headteacher of the Blue Hills Primary School and continued in this post until he was transferred to the District Administration Department as District Commissioner for Providenciales in 1976. With the advent of Ministerial Government in the Turks and Caicos Islands came the demand for permanent secretaries to each of the ministries that were allowed for in the 1976 constitution. In August 1979 Clement Howell was appointed as a Permanent Secretary to the minister responsible for education, health, and welfare. In May 1980, after the death of the country's first chief minister, Howell was transferred to the post of Permanent Secretary to the country's second Chief Minister, Oswald O. Skippings. In November 1980, the People's Democratic Movement (PDM) lost their bid for reelection to the Progressive National Party (PNP) and Howell was re-appointed as headteacher of the Blue Hills Primary School by the PNP administration.

In 1984 Howell resigned his post as headteacher and joined the political arena, where he announced his candidacy to become the representative for Providenciales in the Legislative Council of the Turks and Caicos Islands. After the elections of 1984, he took the oath of office as a member of the Legislative Council for Providenciales and leader of the official opposition. He held both posts until the constitution was suspended in 1986. With the new arrangements for governing the territory, in the absence of ministerial government, Howell was among those selected to serve on an advisory council to the governor. Under pressure from members of his party, Howell later resigned as a member of the advisory council and by mid-1987, he was superseded as leader of the PDM by another of the party's loyalist.

Howell's sphere of influence also spanned his work at Bethany Baptist Church, where he worshipped. He served his church as a deacon and on Providenciales, as secretary of the Providenciales Baptist Association. His work also included a stint of service as secretary and then as president of the Turks and Caicos Islands Baptist Union. He represented his church and the Baptist family of churches at several conferences, including at regional and international events.

He was an outstanding member of the Kiwanis Club of Providenciales and held several memberships in other clubs and service-oriented organisations. A part of his life's work was to see a high school established on Providenciales to meet the educational/social needs of the young people and to put a stop to these young people having to leave home, travelling to Grand Turk, South & North Caicos or The Bahamas for high school education. During his time as a member of the Legislative Council for Providenciales, he worked tenaciously with members of the community and together, they accomplished their goal. The Providenciales High School opened its doors in September 1987.

== Death ==
Towards the end of July 1987, Howell travelled to Nassau, Bahamas to witness the wedding of one of his nephews. On Sunday, August 2, 1987, Howell, along with W. Livingston Swann - his brother-in-law, Martin Walkin, Stanley Gardiner, and pilot, Ken Gardiner, boarded a five-seater Piper Aztec with the call letters N622RH, en route for Providenciales. The plane never arrived and was presumed to have crashed into the sea, killing all on board. The US Coast Guard, BASRA and other local search operations were called off a few days later. Nothing was ever found of the aircraft or the people on board.

== Honours ==
The Providenciales High School was renamed the Clement Howell High School in 1991 in recognition of the stalwart contribution Clement Howell made to the field of education in the Turks and Caicos Islands and in honour of his contribution to agitating for the building of the school.

During the PDM Convention of 2006 Mr. C. Howell was honoured for his contribution to the party and to the development of politics in the Turks and Caicos Islands.

While celebrating the 20th anniversary of the high school, the organisers unveiled a bust of Clement Howell near the entrance of the school and published a commemorative magazine featuring his life and work.

== See also ==
- List of people who disappeared mysteriously at sea
