= Provo United SC =

Turks and Caicos football club

Provo United
- Full name: Provo United Sports Club
- Founded: 2024
- Ground: TCIFA National Academy
- Capacity: 3,000
- Manager: Curtis Paul
- League: Provo Premier League

Provo United SC is an association football club from Providenciales, Turks and Caicos that currently competes in the Provo Premier League.The club is owned by Jamaican educator Andrew-Phillip Waugh

== Domestic results ==
Key

Champion Runners-up 3rd Place

Season	Div.	Apertura						Clausura						Notes
Season	Div.	Pos.	Pl.	W	D	L	Pts.	Pos.	Pl.	W	D	L	Pts.	Notes
2024–25	1st	5th	6	2	0	4	6	4th	6	3	0	3	9	
