= Ian Hurdle =

Turks and Caicos footballer

Personal information
- Date of birth: 3 February 1975 (age 51)
- Place of birth: England
- Position: Midfielder

Senior career*
Years	Team	Apps	(Gls)
–2002	Provo FC		
2002–2008	KPMG United		

International career
1999–2000	Turks and Caicos Islands	4	(0)
- * Club domestic league appearances and goals

Ian Hurdle (born 3 February 1975) is a former footballer who is last known to have played as a midfielder. Born in England, he was a Turks and Caicos Islands international.

== Career ==
He has worked as a coach in the Turks and Caicos Islands under-23.

He is a well-known real estate agent in Turks and Caicos Islands.

He was eligible to represent England internationally, having been born there.
