= Louise Garland Thomas High School =

School in Providenciales, Turks and Caicos

Coordinates: 21.7932°N 72.1644°W

Louise Garland Thomas High School, formerly known as the Long Bay High School is a senior high school in Long Bay, Providenciales, Turks and Caicos.

== History ==
It opened on 7 September 2015, making it the second senior high on the island. 180 students were to be enrolled at the beginning. The school was initially housed at Clement Howell High School as the first building was not yet complete for its planned October opening. In that period Clement Howell and Long Bay students attended classes together, although the latter already began wearing their own uniforms. Initially the school had the first form, with second form coming afterwards and with a plan for it being a full high school. In October of that year Carlton Mills became principal.

The first Long Bay building, with a cost of $1 million U.S. dollars, opened in November that year. Construction of the second phase began that year. The institution's third block, which has classrooms and laboratories for science classes, opened in 2018.

In 2017 the Turks and Caicos Sun stated that "reliable sources" indicated overcrowding and a negative "temperament" of the principal.

== School uniforms ==
The school uniform consists of a white shirt, grey slacks and suit coat, and a yellow tie. Deandra S Hamilton of Magnetic Media reported that there were concerns that the uniform was unsuited for the local climate. Long Bay students began wearing the Long Bay uniform from the beginning, when students were located at Clement Howell.
