= Sonia Bien-Aime =

Turks and Caicos football administrator

- Born: Sonia Bien-Amie Fulford; 3 December 1971 (age 54)
- Occupations: Member, FIFA Council

Sonia Bien-Aime Fulford (born 3 December 1971) is a Turks and Caicos football administrator, the president of the Turks and Caicos Islands Football Association (TCIFA), a member of the FIFA Council, and the executive committee of CONCACAF.

Bien-Aime grew up on Grand Turk Island. She has four sisters and one brother. She represented her country in athletics, softball, and football, where she captained the Turks & Caicos Women's National Team.

Bien-Aime became general secretary of the TCIFA in 2006, and was elected president of the Association in July 2014, succeeding Christopher Bryan. She was the first woman to be elected president of the TCIFA.

Bien-Aime has been a FIFA Council member since 2015.
