= Provo Haitian Stars FC =

Association football club in Turks and Caicos

Provo Haitian Stars
- Full name: Haitian Stars Football Club

Provo Haitian Stars FC is a football club of the Turks and Caicos Islands. The team last played in the Turks and Caicos first division, the MFL League, in the 2006–07 season.
