= Clement Howell High School =

School in Turks and Caicos

Coordinates: 21°48′16″N 72°16′27″W

Clement Howell High School is a senior high school in Providenciales, Turks and Caicos. Named after Clement Howell, it serves forms three through five and is operated by the Ministry of Education (Turks and Caicos).

== History ==
It opened in September 1987.

At one time its enrollment reached 1,064, and Dandrea Hamilton of Magnetic Media wrote that underfunding and overpopulation contributed to "gang-type" violent incidents. Hamilton stated that conditions improved by 2017. The campus was damaged by Hurricane Irma; there was repair work carried out by October 31 though The Sun stated that students and parents felt more improvements needed to be done. In 2017 it had 564 students.

In 2015 the T&C government had not finalised a contract for repairing the science block in time for October 2015, the original planned date. Long Bay High School was initially housed at Clement Howell High upon its 2015 establishment as that school's first building was not yet complete for its planned October opening. In that period Clement Howell and Long Bay students attended classes together, although the latter already began wearing their own uniforms. There were miscommunications stating that Clement Howell had too many students and was turning some prospective students away when this was not the case.
