= Dady Aristide =

Turks and Caicos Islands footballer

Personal information
- Date of birth: 6 June 1970 (age 56)
- Position: Forward

Senior career*
Years	Team	Apps	(Gls)
- Master Hammer
- SWA Sharks

International career^{‡}
2000–2018	Turks and Caicos Islands	4	(0)
- * Club domestic league appearances and goals as of 29 March 2021 ‡ National team caps and goals as of 29 March 2021

Dady Aristide (born 6 June 1970) is a Turks and Caicos Islands footballer.

== International career ==
By virtue of playing in an 8–0 defeat to Guyana in October 2018, Aristide became the fifth oldest male international footballer of all time. He was 48 years and 129 days old.

== Career statistics ==
=== International ===
As of match played 30 March 2021.

National team	Year	Apps	Goals
Turks and Caicos Islands	2000	1	0
Turks and Caicos Islands	2015	2	0
Turks and Caicos Islands	2018	1	0
Total		4	0

== Notes ==
1.Aristide is listed as the seventh oldest player on the RSSSF website. However, Barrie Dewsbury at number 1 and Keith Yon at number 3 represented Sark and St Helena, respectively, and are not counted as full internationals.
