= Rozo FC =

Association football club in Turks and Caicos

- Full name: Rozo Football Club
- Ground: TCIFA National Academy, Providenciales, Turks and Caicos Islands
- Capacity: 3,000
- League: WIV Provo Premier League
- 2014: 3rd
Home colours

Rozo FC is a football club from Turks and Caicos. They play in the Turks and Caicos first division, the WIV Provo Premier League.

== Achievements ==
- WIV Provo Premier League:

Runners-up (1): 2013
