= Tropic All Stars =

Association football club in Turks and Caicos

Tropic All Stars is a football club of Turks and Caicos. They won the inaugural edition of the Turks and Caicos top division, then known as the MFL League, in 1999.
