= SWA Sharks FC =

Association football club in Turks and Caicos

SWA Sharks
- Full name: SWA Sharks Football Club
- Nickname: The Sharks
- Founded: 1996; 30 years ago
- Ground: TCIFA National Academy, Providenciales, Turks and Caicos
- Capacity: 3,000
- Owner: SWA Architects LTD
- Manager: Christopher Bryan
- League: Provo Premier League

SWA Sharks Football Club is an association football club from the Turks and Caicos Islands that plays in the Provo Premier League.

== History ==
SWA Sharks is the Turks and Caicos Islands' oldest club. First organized for a 5-a-side tournament in 1996, the club registered with the Turks and Caicos Islands Football Association in 1998. Since then, it has competed in every season of the Provo Premier League and has become the league's dominant club. The club won three consecutive league titles from 2019-20 through 2022–23.

By competing in the 2022 Caribbean Club Shield, SWA Sharks became the first team from the Turks and Caicos to take part in an official international competition. With a 3–1 victory over Real Rincon of Bonaire that year, the club earned the first victory by a TCI club in an international competition. The club's goals were scored by Callum Park, Junior Paul, and Jeff Beljour. The Sharks competed in the competition three consecutive years by subsequently qualifying for the 2023 and 2024 editions of the tournament.

The Sharks were once again league champions for the 2024–25 season, again qualifying for the CFU Club Shield in 2026. The club also captured the Turks and Caicos FA Cup title that season to win the double. Sharks head coach Christopher Bryan was later named Coach of the Year at the TCI FA's annual awards ceremony.

== Results ==
=== Domestic ===
Key

Champion Runners-up 3rd Place

Season	Div.	League						Playoffs	Notes						
Season	Div.	Pos.	Pl.	W	D	L	Pts.	Playoffs	Notes						
2016	1st	5th	12	5	0	7	15	N/A							
Season	Div.	First Round						Playoffs						Notes	
Season	Div.	Pos.	Pl.	W	D	L	Pts.	Pos.	Pl.	W	D	L	Pts.	Notes	
2017	1st	6th	6	2	1	3	7	6th	4	2	0	2	6		
Season	Div.	League						Playoffs	Notes						
Season	Div.	Pos.	Pl.	W	D	L	Pts.	Playoffs	Notes						
2018	1st	3rd	10	6	1	3	19	N/A							
2019	1st	5th	10	4	0	6	12	Round 1							
Season	Div.	Apertura						Clausura						Playoffs	Notes
Season	Div.	Pos.	Pl.	W	D	L	Pts.	Pos.	Pl.	W	D	L	Pts.	Playoffs	Notes
2019–20	1st	1st	12	10	0	2	30	suspended, then cancelled because of COVID-19 pandemic							
2020–21	1st	Not held because of COVID-19 pandemic													
2021–22	1st	2nd	10	6	2	2	20	1st	10	8	1	1	25	1st	
2022–23	1st	1st	8	6	2	0	20	1st	8	5	2	1	17	1st	
2023–24	1st	2nd	8	6	0	2	18	2nd	6	4	0	2	12	2nd	
2024–25	1st	2nd	6	5	0	1	15	1st	6	5	1	0	15	1st	
2025–26	1st	1st	7	6	1	0	19	2nd	7	5	1	1	16	2nd	

=== International ===
Results list SWA Sharks FC's goal tally first.

Win Draw Loss Fixture

Competition	Round	Club	Score
2022 Caribbean Club Shield	Group Stage	(Curaçao) Jong Holland	0–1
2022 Caribbean Club Shield	Group Stage	(Guadeloupe) Gosier	0–1
2022 Caribbean Club Shield	Group Stage	(Bonaire) Real Rincon	3–1
2023 CONCACAF Caribbean Shield	Group Stage	(Aruba) Dakota	0–2
2023 CONCACAF Caribbean Shield	Group Stage	(Trinidad and Tobago) Club Sando	0–9
2023 CONCACAF Caribbean Shield	Group Stage	(Guadeloupe) Solidarité-Scolaire	1–1
2024 CFU Club Shield	Preliminary Round	(Grenada) Paradise FC International	1–0
2024 CFU Club Shield	Round of 16	(Puerto Rico) Metropolitan	0–2
2026 CFU Club Shield	First Round	(Guyana) Slingerz	0–4

== Honours ==
Competitions	Titles	Seasons
Provo Premier League	5	2001, 2019–20, 2021–22, 2022–23, 2024–25
Turks and Caicos FA Cup	3	2021, 2024, 2025
