= Provo Premier League =

Association football league in Turks and Caicos

- Founded: 1999; 27 years ago
- First season: 1999
- Country: Turks and Caicos Islands
- Confederation: CONCACAF
- Number of clubs: 8 (since 2025–26)
- Level on pyramid: 1
- Domestic cup: Turks and Caicos FA Cup
- International cup: CFU Club Championship
- Current champions: Academy Eagles (2025–26)
- Most championships: AFC Academy (8 titles)
- Top scorer: (Republic of Ireland) Brian Gregg (67 goals)
- Broadcaster(s): FIFA+
- Current: 2025–26 Provo Premier League

The Provo Premier League is the top division of the Turks and Caicos Islands Football Association. Despite being a league competition in CONCACAF none of the Turks and Caicos' teams ever played in the CFU Club Championship nor CONCACAF Champions League. The winners of the competition qualify for the CFU Club Shield. The TCIFA National Academy stadium hosts all league games. Matches are streamed for free at FIFA+, the online streaming platform of the governing soccer body.

== Teams ==
For the 2024-25 season, the league comprises seven teams:

- Academy Eagles FC
- SWA Sharks FC
- Teachers FC
- Cheshire Hall FC
- Beaches FC
- Teachers FC Young Strikers
- Provo United

== Competition format ==
The teams play two short tournaments that divide the regular season in half, resulting in two champions. The Apertura runs from November to February and the Clausura from February to April. If one team wins both phases, they are named the champion of the league. Should two different teams win the individual phases, a knockout playoff is scheduled. There is a post-season knockout playoff that is played after the end of the clausura schedule.

The league has been renamed seven times in the 26 years since it was founded;

- Western Union Football League (1999 – 2003)
- MFL League (2003 – 2009)
- MFL Super4s (2010 – 2011)
- WIV Provo Premier League (2012 – 2014)
- Digicel Play Provo Premier League (2014 – 2015)
- Gilley's Enterprises Provo Premier League (2016)
- The Provo Premier League (2017 – present)

== Previous winners ==
All winners listed according to RSSSF:

Season	Winner
1999	Tropic All Stars
2000	Masters
2001	SWA Sharks
2002	Beaches
2002–03	Caribbean All Stars
2003–04	KPMG United
2004–05	KPMG United
2005–06	Cost Right
2006–07	Beaches
2007–08	PWC Athletic
2008–09	Digi
2009–10	AFC Academy
2010–11	Provopool
2012	Cheshire Hall
2013	Cheshire Hall
2014	AFC Academy
2014–15	AFC Academy
2016	AFC Academy
2017	Beaches
2018	Academy Jaguars
2019	Academy Jaguars
2019–20	SWA Sharks
2020–21	not held due to COVID-19 pandemic
2021–22	SWA Sharks
2022–23	SWA Sharks
2023–24	Academy Eagles
2024–25	SWA Sharks
2025–26	Academy Eagles

== Titles by team ==
Team	Titles	Year(s)
AFC Academy (Academy Jaguars & Academy Eagles)	8	2009–10, 2014, 2014–15, 2016, 2018, 2019, 2023–24, 2025–26
SWA Sharks	5	2001, 2019–20, 2021–22, 2022–23, 2024–25
PWC Athletic	3	2003–04*, 2004–05*, 2007–08
Beaches	3	2002, 2006–07, 2017
Cheshire Hall	2	2012, 2013
Caribbean All Stars	2	1999**, 2002–03
Cost Right	1	2005–06
Digi	1	2008–09
Masters	1	2000
Provopool	1	2010–11

* As KPMG United
** As Tropic All Stars

== Individual statistics ==
=== Top goalscorers ===
Season	Best scorers	Team	Goals
2002–03	(Haiti) Dady Aristide	Master Hammer	12
2003–04	(Haiti) Sadrac Mondestine	KPMG United	41
2005–06	(Saint Kitts and Nevis) Kirkland Harris	Cost Right	21
2006–07	(Turks and Caicos Islands) Billy Forbes	Provopool	11
2006–07	(Jamaica) Horace James	Beaches	11
2008–09	(Turks and Caicos Islands) Billy Forbes	Academy	11
2009–10	(Jamaica) Horace James	Sharks	17
2010–11	(Turks and Caicos Islands) Marco Fenelus	National	20
2012	Samuel Narcius	Cheshire Hall	11
2012	(Turks and Caicos Islands) Fred Dorvil	Academy	11
2016	(Turks and Caicos Islands) Raymond Burey	Academy	6
2018	(Haiti) Jeanlis Job	Cheshire Hall	19
2019	(Haiti) Jeanlis Job	Cheshire Hall	15
2019–20	(Haiti) Rouby Philius	Flamingo	19
2022–23	(Republic of Ireland) Brian Gregg	Sharks	21
2022–23	(Haiti) Jean Innocent	Academy	21
2023–24	(Republic of Ireland) Brian Gregg	Sharks	13
2024–25	(Haiti) Jean Innocent	Academy	22
2025-26	(Republic of Ireland) Brian Gregg	Sharks	20

Most times goalscorer

- 3 times.
  - (Republic of Ireland) Brian Gregg (2022-23. 2023-24 and 2025-26).

Most goals by a player in a single season

- 41 goals.
  - (Haiti) Sandra Modestine (2003-04).

=== Multiple hat-tricks ===
Rank	Country	Player	Hat-tricks
1	(Republic of Ireland)	Brian Gregg	10
2	(Haiti)	Jean Innocent	6
3	(Turks and Caicos Islands)	Ismael Athis	3
4	(Turks and Caicos Islands)	Salomon Clemanio	2
4		Sterlin Glory	2
4	(Turks and Caicos Islands)	Junior Paul	2
4		Paulsaint Standley	2
8	(Turks and Caicos Islands)	Junior Belizarie	1
8		Kerwins Bruno	1
8		Josep Friend-Leer	1
8		Idelin Gardiner	1
8		Herwens Guerrier	1
8		Kenlove Joseph	1
8	(Haiti)	Matony Junior	1
8		Toby Sheppard	1
8		Rean Waugh	1
