= KPMG United FC =

Association football club in Turks and Caicos

Home colours

KPMG United FC is a football club of the Turks and Caicos Islands. It was renamed PWC Athletic in 2006. The team won the MFL League title in 2003–04 and 2004–05 under the name KPMG United FC and in 2007–08 as PWC Athletic.

== Former players ==
- (Turks and Caicos Islands) Ian Hurdle

== Achievements ==
- MFL League:

2003–04, 2004–05, 2007–08
