= Turks and Caicos Islands Football Association =

Governing body of football in the Turks and Caicos Islands

CONCACAF
- Founded: 1996
- FIFA affiliation: 1998
- CONCACAF affiliation: 1994 (Associate member), 1998
- President: Sonia Bien-Aime
- Website: tcifa.com

The Turks and Caicos Islands Football Association is the governing body of football in the Turks and Caicos Islands. They control the Turks and Caicos Islands national football team, the MFL League men's league, the Turks and Caicos FA Cup and the WFL League women's league.

Its current president is Sonia Bien-Aime, who replaced Christopher Bryan in 2014.

== Association staff ==
Name	Position	Source
(Turks and Caicos Islands) Sonia Bien-Aime	President	
(Turks and Caicos Islands) Lisa Garland	Vice-president	
(United States) Michael McDonald	2nd Vice-president	
n/a	General secretary	
n/a	Treasurer	
(Turks and Caicos Islands) Dane Ritchie	Technical director	
n/a	Team coach (men's)	
(Jamaica) Aaron Lawrence	Team coach (women's)	
(Turks and Caicos Islands) Candia Ewing	Media/communications manager	
n/a	Futsal Coordinator	
(Turks and Caicos Islands) Patrice Senior	Referee coordinator	
