= Teachers FC =

Turks and Caicos football club

- Full name: Teachers Football Club
- Founded: 2012
- Ground: TCIFA National Academy
- Capacity: 3,000
- Manager: Taiwayne Lewin
- League: Provo Premier League

Teachers FC is an association football club from Providenciales, Turks and Caicos that currently competes in the Provo Premier League.

== History ==
The club was founded in 2012 as Pedagogue FC. After just one season, the club was renamed Teachers FC in 2013.

== Women's team ==
The club also fields a highly successful team in the Women's Premier League.
