= AFC Academy =

Association football club in Turks and Caicos

- Full name: AFC Academy
- Nickname: The Academy
- Founded: 2007
- Ground: TCIFA National Academy, Providenciales, Turks and Caicos Islands
- Capacity: 3,000
- Manager: Dane Ritchie
- League: WIV Provo Premier League
- 2019–20: 1st
Home colours	Away colours

AFC Academy is a football club from Turks and Caicos. They play in the Turks and Caicos first division, the WIV Provo Premier League.

== Current squad ==
Squad for the 2019-20 WIV Provo Premier League

Note: Flags indicate national team as defined under FIFA eligibility rules; some limited exceptions apply. Players may hold more than one non-FIFA nationality.

No.	Pos.	Nation	Player
—	GK	HAI	Ivenson Philogène
—	DF	TCA	Jeff Beljour
—	DF	TCA	Markenly Pierre
—	DF	TCA	Ledson Jerome
—	DF	HAI	Jean Antenor
—	DF	TCA	Junior Paul
—	DF	TCA	Markenly Amilcar
—	MF	TCA	Antoine Watson
—	MF	TCA	Jeff Davilmar
—	MF	TCA	Rosmith Messieur

No.	Pos.	Nation	Player
—	MF	HAI	Jefflyn Smith
—	MF	HAI	Ricardo Joasilus
—	MF	TCA	Jose Elcius
—	FW	USA	Patrick Alouidor
—	FW	JAM	Raymond Burey
—	FW	TCA	Paul Claudel
—	FW	HAI	Rolph Dorvil

=== Staff ===
Position	Name
Head coach	(Jamaica) Dane Ritchie

== Achievements ==
- WIV Provo Premier League
  - Champions (4): 2009–10, 2014, 2014–15, 2016
