= Cheshire Hall FC =

Association football club in Turks and Caicos

Cheshire Hall
- Full name: Cheshire Hall
- Nickname: Pirates
- Founded: 1999
- Ground: TCIFA National Academy, Providenciales, Turks and Caicos Islands
- Capacity: 3,000
- League: WIV Provo Premier League
- 2024–25: 3rd
Home colours	Away colours

Cheshire Hall is a football club of Turks and Caicos. They play in the Turks and Caicos first division, the Provo Premier League. The club has won two domestic titles, and the domestic cup on two occasions. The club enjoyed their best run of history in the early 2010s.

== Achievements ==
- Presidents Cup TCIFA: 2
  - 2012, 2014
- WIV Provo Premier League: 2
  - 2012, 2013
