= Beaches FC =

Association football club in Turks and Caicos

- Full name: Beaches Football Club
- Ground: TCIFA National Academy
- Capacity: 3,000
- Manager: Johnny Suckrajk
- League: WIV Provo Premier League
- 2024–25: 6th
Home colours

Beaches FC is a football club of Turks and Caicos.

They play in the Turks and Caicos first division, the WIV Provo Premier League. They were champions in 2002 and 2006−07.

== Achievements ==
- WIV Provo Premier League: 3

2002, 2006−07, 2017.

== Current squad ==
As of 22 July 2018

Note: Flags indicate national team as defined under FIFA eligibility rules; some limited exceptions apply. Players may hold more than one non-FIFA nationality.

No.	Pos.	Nation	Player
—	GK	TCA	Steven Parnell
—	GK	JAM	Ricard Brown
—	GK	JAM	Johnny Suckrajh
—	DF	JAM	Ainsworth Reid
—	DF	JAM	Kenneth Lewis
—	DF	JAM	Bradley McLean
—	DF	JAM	Delano Archer
—	DF	USA	Vernon Johnson
—	DF	JAM	Alwayne Spence
—	MF	JAM	Michael Laird
—	MF	JAM	Stephen Haye
—	MF	TCA	Ajah Johnson
—	MF	JAM	Sean Findlater

No.	Pos.	Nation	Player
—	MF	TCA	Dwayne Lindsay
—	MF	TCA	Kemoy Piper
—	MF	TCA	Kelly Louima
—	MF	JAM	Coy Haughton
—	MF	JAM	Danar Lewis
—	MF	JAM	Navar Cumberland
—	MF	TCA	Ketroy Rose
—	MF	TCA	Texroy Robinson
—	FW	JAM	Romaine Small
—	FW	TCA	Lenford Singh
—	FW	TCA	Richard Brock
—	FW	TCA	Rameeshe Thompson
