= Providenciales =

Island and the largest city of Turks and Caicos Islands

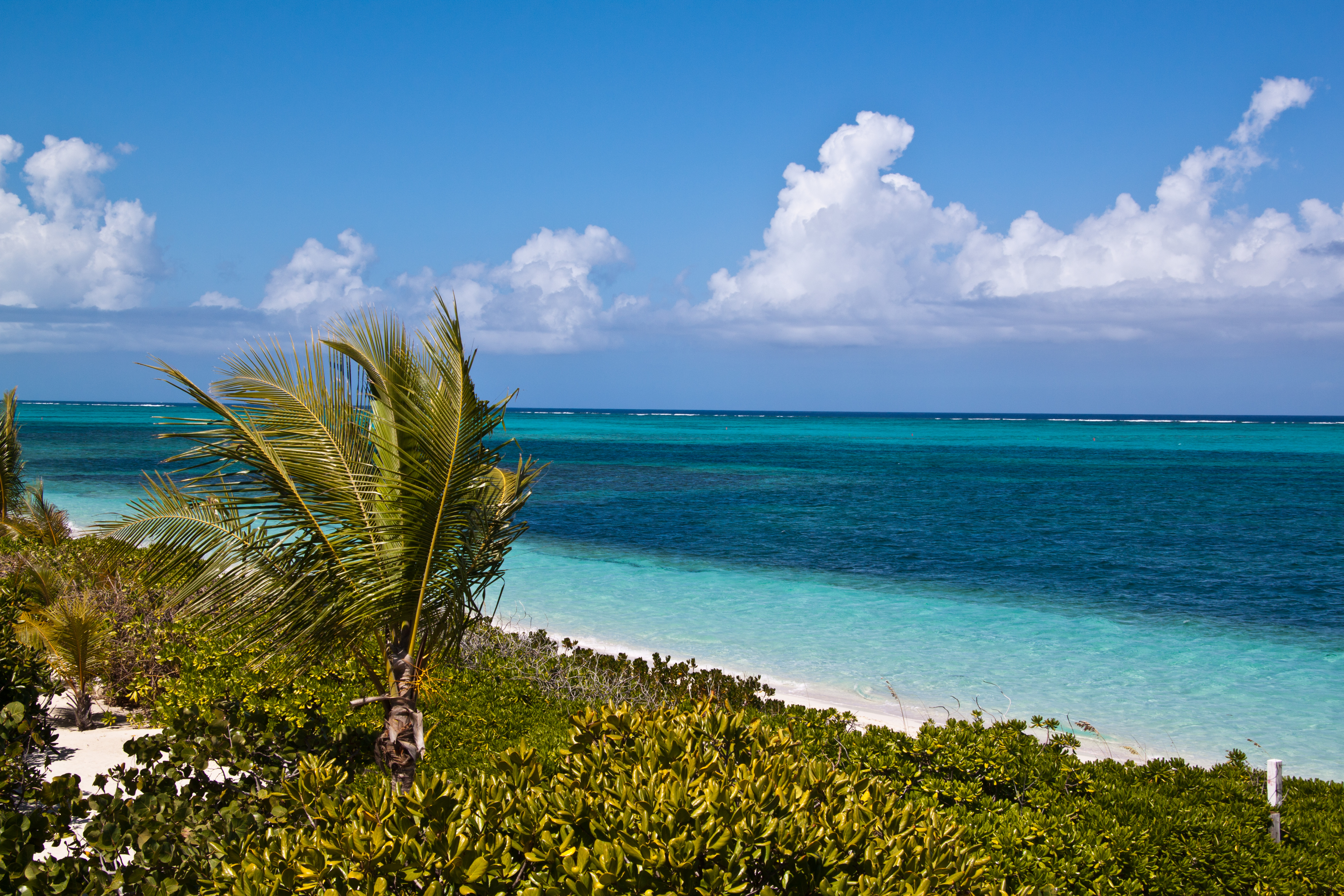
- Turtle Cove, Providenciales

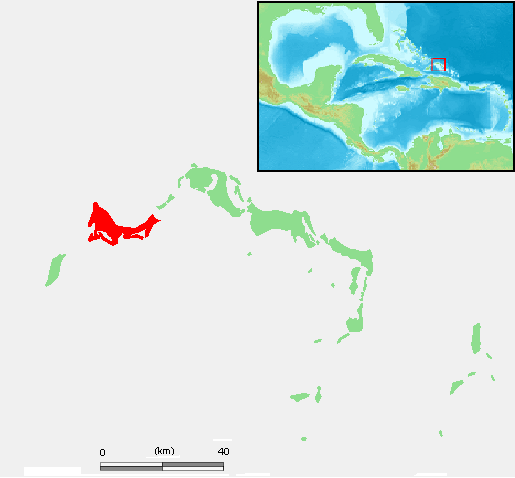
- Location of Providenciales within the Turks and Caicos Islands

- Location within Turks and Caicos Islands Location within the Caribbean

Geography
- Location: Atlantic Ocean
- Coordinates: 21°46′39″N 72°15′44″W
- Archipelago: Lucayan Archipelago

Administration
- United Kingdom
- British Overseas Territory: Turks and Caicos Islands

Demographics
- Population: 23,769 (2012)

Additional information
- Time zone: EST (UTC-5)
  - Summer (DST): EDT (UTC-4)
- ISO code: TC

Providenciales (known locally as Provo) is an island in the northwest Caicos Islands, part of the Turks and Caicos Islands, a British Overseas Territory. The island has an area of 98 km^{2} (38 mi^{2}) and had a population of 23,769 as of 2012, the latest date for which an island-by-island census was published by the government. Providenciales is the third largest island in the Turks and Caicos in area, and is home to a majority of the population of the Turks and Caicos Islands.

== Transportation ==
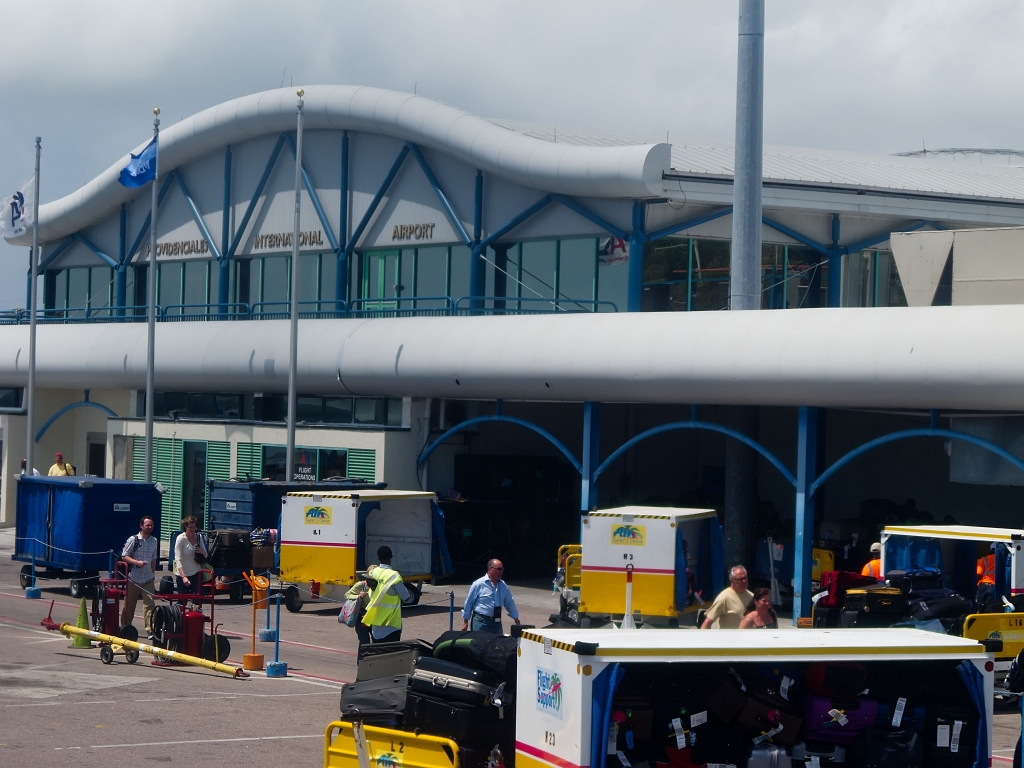
Providenciales International Airport

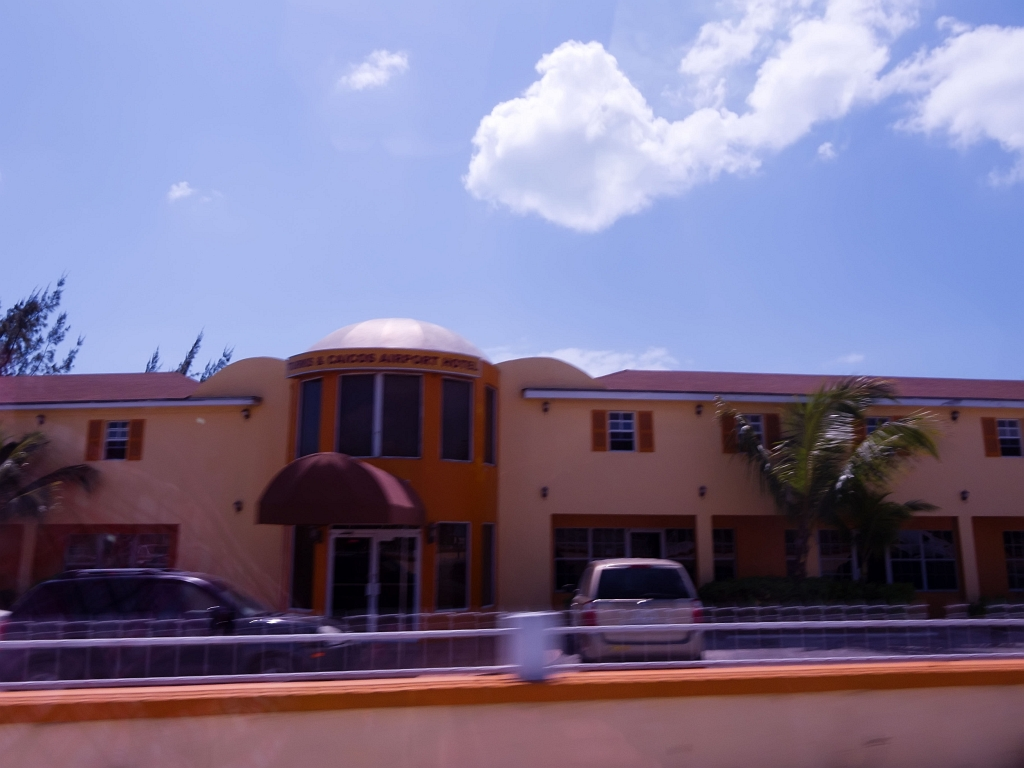
Turks and Caicos Airport Hotel

The island is served by the Providenciales International Airport.

There is no public transportation on the island.

As recently as 1964, Providenciales did not have a single wheeled vehicle. Roads, water, telephones, and electricity were also absent. The original developer, Provident, Ltd, had shuttle flights from Florida (for a real estate buying program) two times a week in a World War II DC-3 plane and the only hotel was the Third Turtle Inn built by them in 1967.

== Economy ==
Providenciales is the most tourist-oriented and developed of the Turks and Caicos Islands, boasting many resort hotels and an 18-hole golf course. The island has recently become popular with retirees from around the world, kindling a boom of residential development. Grace Bay has seen many luxury condos built on its shores.

== Visitor attractions ==
The island is close to a common migration route for the humpback whale. Providenciales is surrounded by uninhabited cays that are easily reached by chartered boat or excursion.

The resorts on Providenciales are primarily centred on 5 mi (8 km) long Grace Bay. Apart from the beaches, the island's charm lies in its rugged hills and ridges, which are carpeted with prickly pear cactus and scrub.

Long Bay Beach, on the southern, windward side of the island is still largely undeveloped save for a large luxury resort on the northern tip of the beach. Due to its steady wind and relatively isolated location, Long Bay Beach is rapidly becoming a kiteboarding destination in the Caribbean.

There are remnants of Caribbean piracy at Osprey Rock and Sapodilla Hill, and the ruins of Cheshire Hall plantation, a sisal and cotton plantation owned by the British Loyalist, Thomas Stubbs from the 1790s until 1810.

== Ecology ==
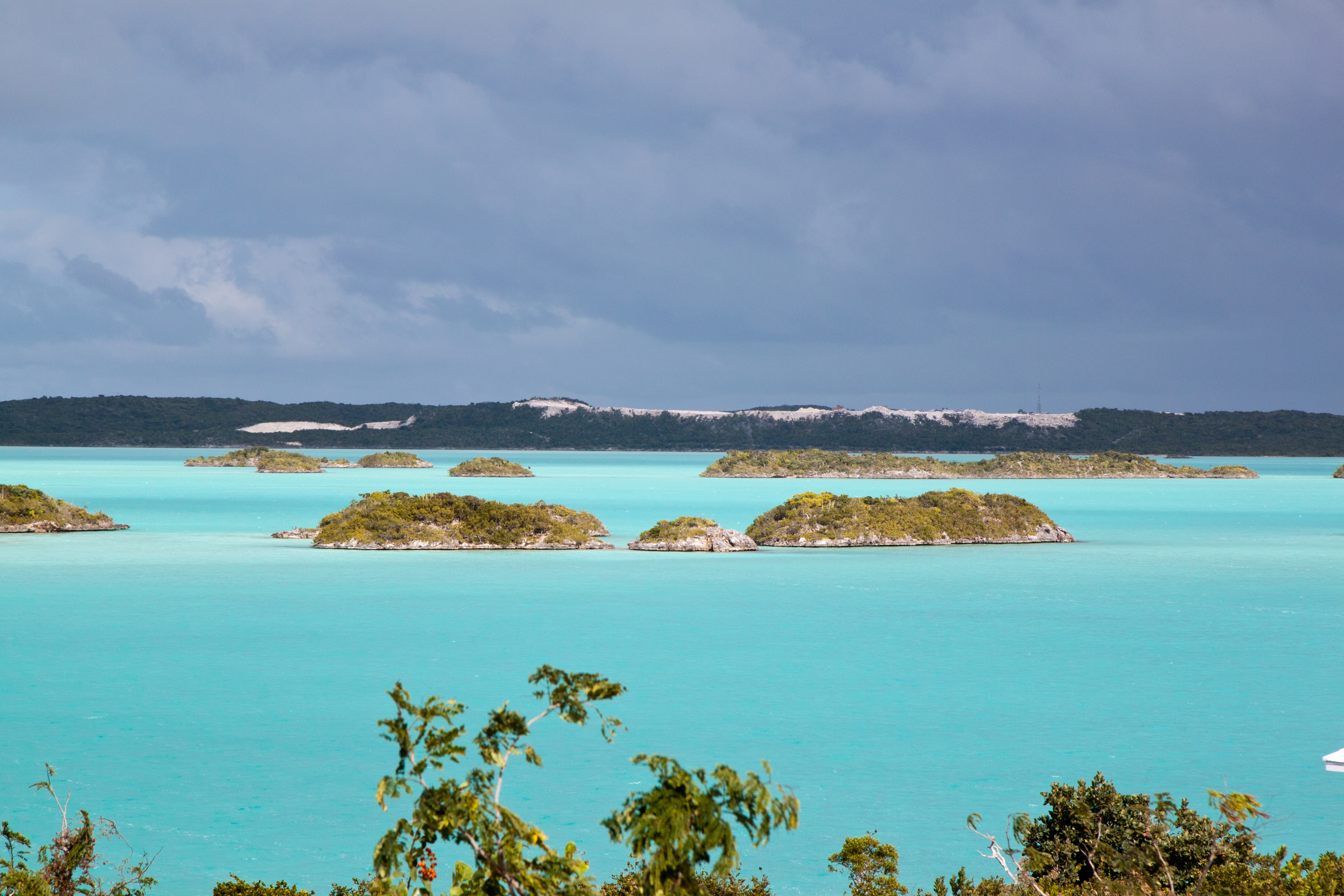
Chalk Sound

The western half of Providenciales is mostly barren wilderness, home to the island's best natural attraction, Chalk Sound National Park. The park is a 3 mi (5 km) long bay southwest of Downtown. The colour of the water is a uniform turquoise and studded with countless mushroom-like tiny islets. Also on the western part of the island is Northwest Point Marine National Park, which extends to nearby reefs and several saline lakes that attract breeding and migrant waterfowl.

== Towns ==
The major road, the Leeward Highway, runs east–west from Downtown to Leeward. Most of the island's services are near the Highway, including shopping plazas.

The communities of Downtown and Kew Town are located near Providenciales International Airport. The town of Wheeland is in the northwest corner of the island.

Before Provo became a popular tourist destination, there were three small centers of population: Blue Hills, The Bight (on Grace Bay) and Five Cays. Now many houses have been built, predominantly in the east and south, with larger communities at Leeward, Long Bay and Chalk Sound, as well as expansion of the original three settlements. There are also pockets of makeshift shacks interspersed among the more upscale residences.

== Education ==
Clement Howell High School and Long Bay High School are the local public high schools.

International School of the Turks and Caicos Islands, which serves preschool through grade six, is also in Providenciales, in Leeward. In 2014 it had 106 students. It was known as The Ashcroft School until 2014.

Providenciales Primary and Middle School is another prominent school along with the British West Indies Collegiate.

== Images ==
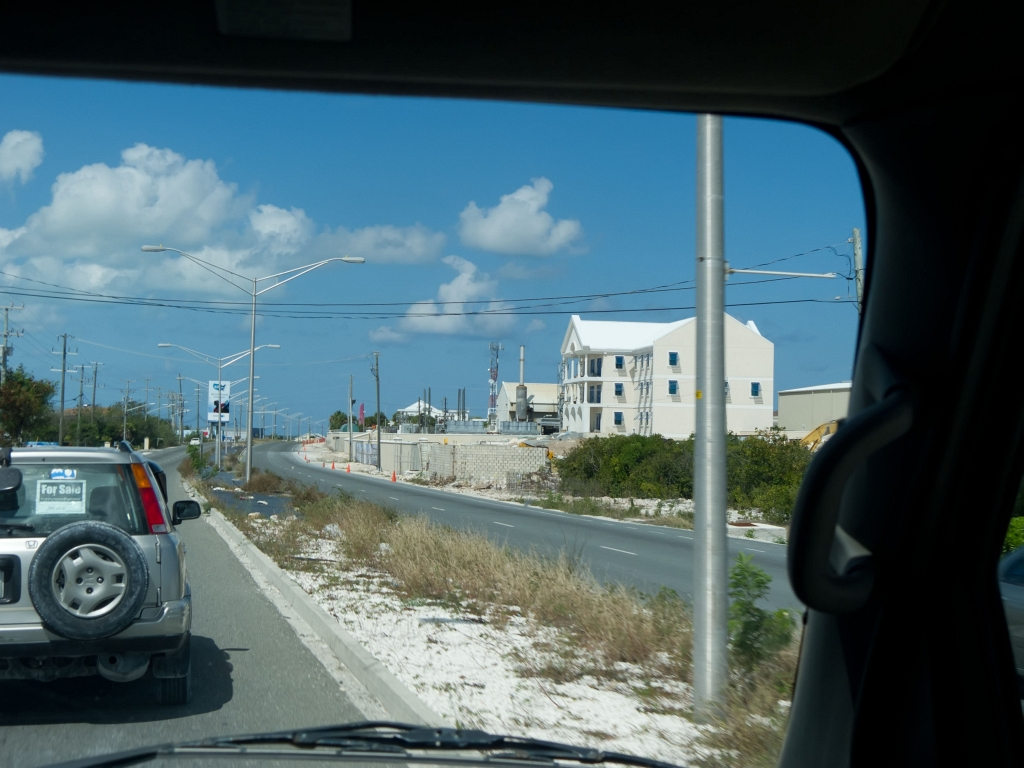
The Leeward Highway

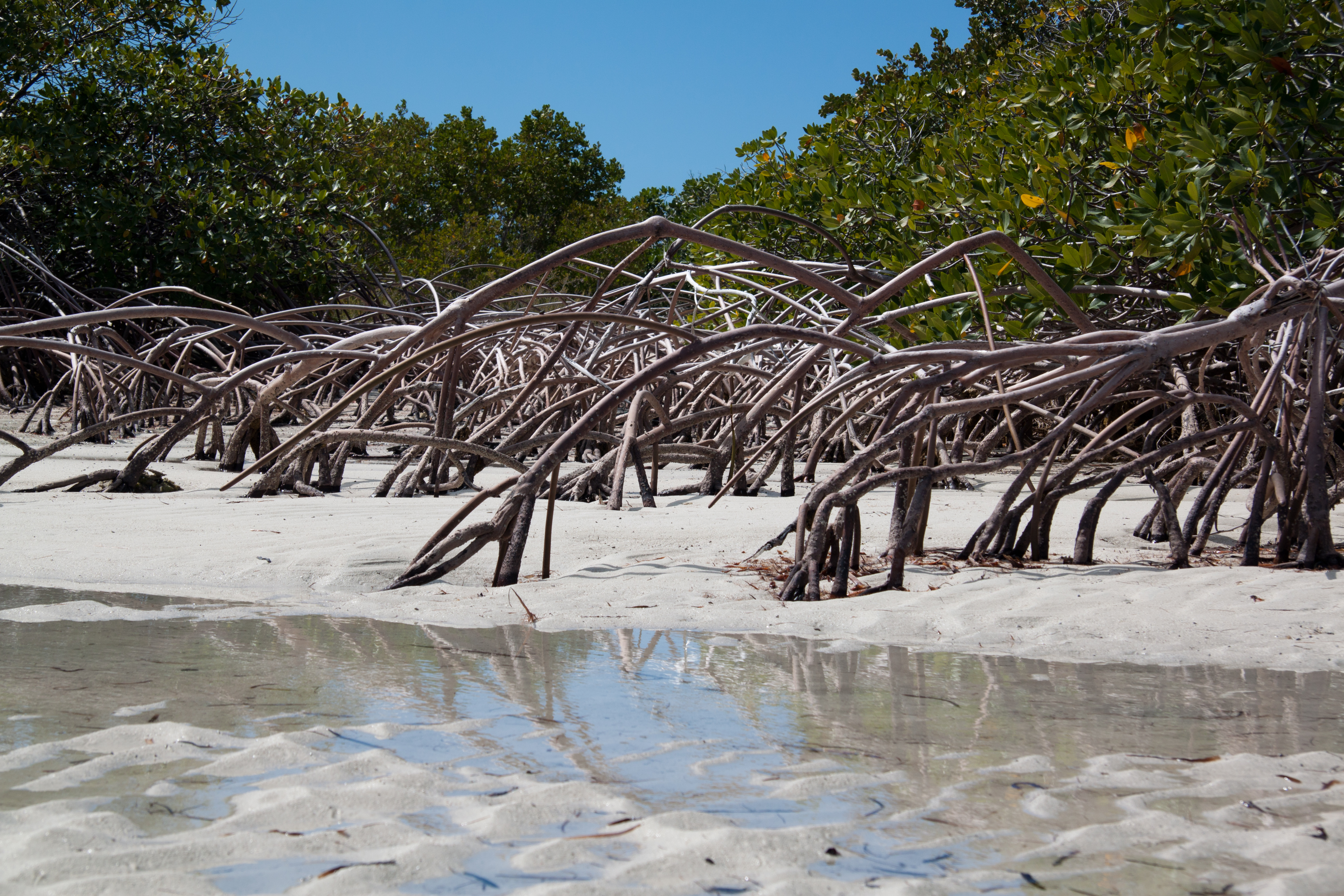
Providenciales Mangrove Reflections
