= TCIFA National Academy =

Stadium in Providenciales, Turks and Caicos Islands

Coordinates: 21.773026°N 72.211992°W

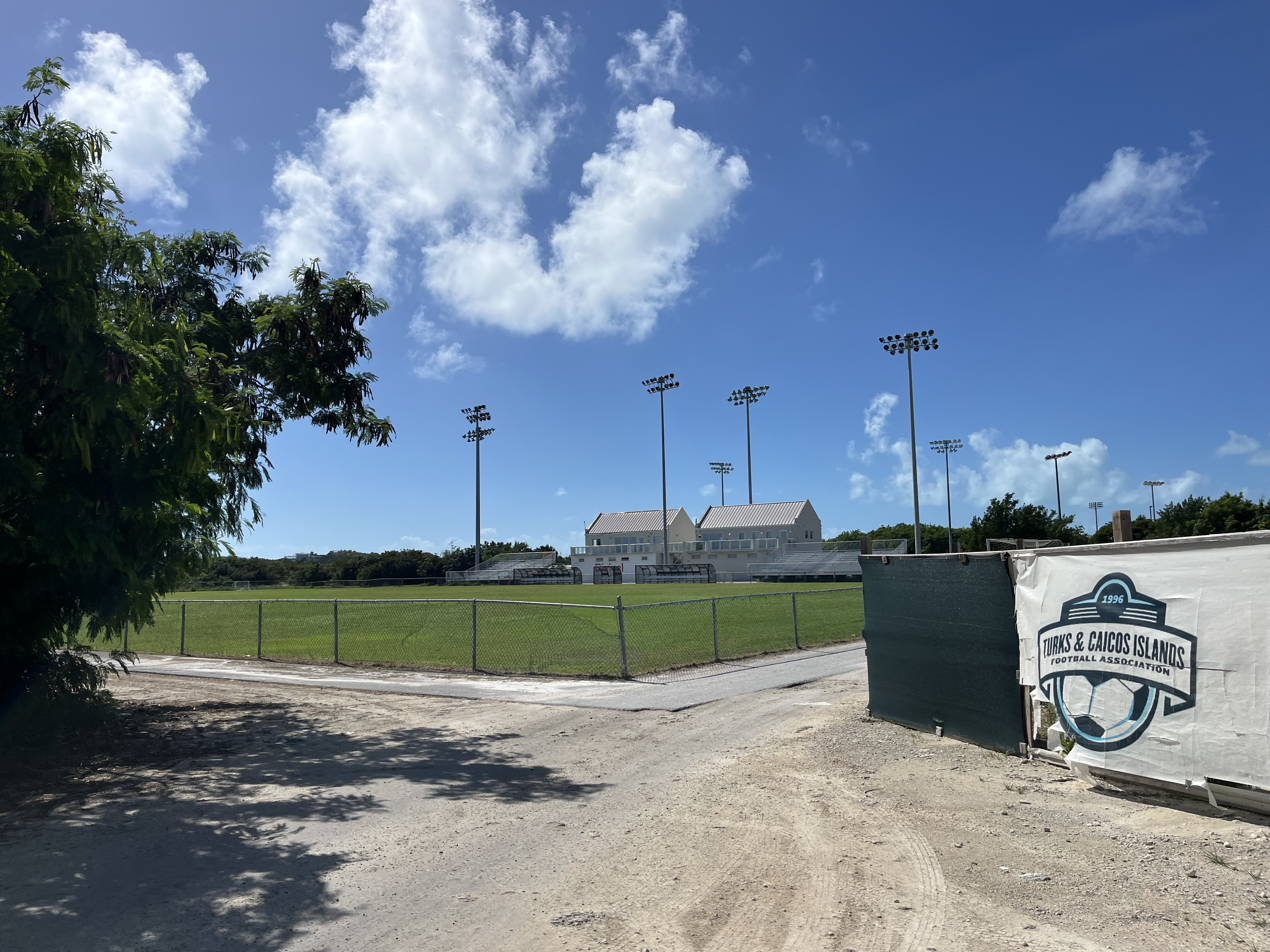
TCIFA National Academy

TCIFA National Academy is a multi-use stadium in Providenciales, Turks and Caicos Islands. It is currently used mostly for football matches. The stadium's capacity is 3,000, and it was built in 2004.
