= Zulueta =

Zulueta is a Basque and Spanish surname. Notable people with the surname include:

- Dawn Zulueta (born 1969), Filipina film and television actress
- Eduardo de Zulueta y Dato (born 1923), Spanish diplomat
- Elisa Zulueta (born 1981), Chilean television, theatre and film actress
- Ernesto de Zulueta e Isasi (1892–1969), Spanish diplomat
- Ernesto de Zulueta y Samá (1855–1919), Spanish politician
- Francis de Zulueta (1878–1958), British professor of Civil Law at Oxford
- Francisco Zulueta (1891–1947), Flilipino judge and politician
- Ivan Zulueta (1943–2009), Spanish designer and film director
- José Zulueta (1889–1972), Filipino lawyer and politician who was elected as Senate President
- José Clemente Zulueta (1876–1904), Filipino writer, historian and bibliographer
- Julián de Zulueta, 1st Marquis of Álava (1814–1878), Spanish politician of Basque descent
- Leo Zulueta (born 1952), American tattoo artist
- Leyén Zulueta (born 1979), Cuban judoka
- Luis de Zulueta (1878–1964), Spanish politician and diplomat
- Sir Philip de Zulueta (1925–1989), British diplomat and businessman, son of Francis de Zulueta
- Pinggot Zulueta (born 1961), Filipino visual artist and photojournalist
- R. Zulueta da Costa (1915–1990), Filipino poet
- Ricardo Zulueta (1907–1937), Spanish footballer who disappeared during the civil war
- Ricardo Estanislao Zulueta (born 1962), Cuban-born American artist of Basque and Spanish ancestry
- Roberto Zulueta (born 1957), Cuban handball player
- Yosver Zulueta (born 1998), Cuban baseball player

== Places ==
- Zulueta, Navarre, village in Navarre, Spain
- Zulueta (Remedios), village in Villa Clara province, Cuba
- Calle Zulueta, Havana, street in Havana, Cuba

== See also ==
- Étienne de Silhouette or de Zulueta (1709–1767), French Controller-General of Finances
