= Calle Zulueta, Havana =

Street in Havana, Cuba

Calle Zulueta
- Ignacio Agramonte
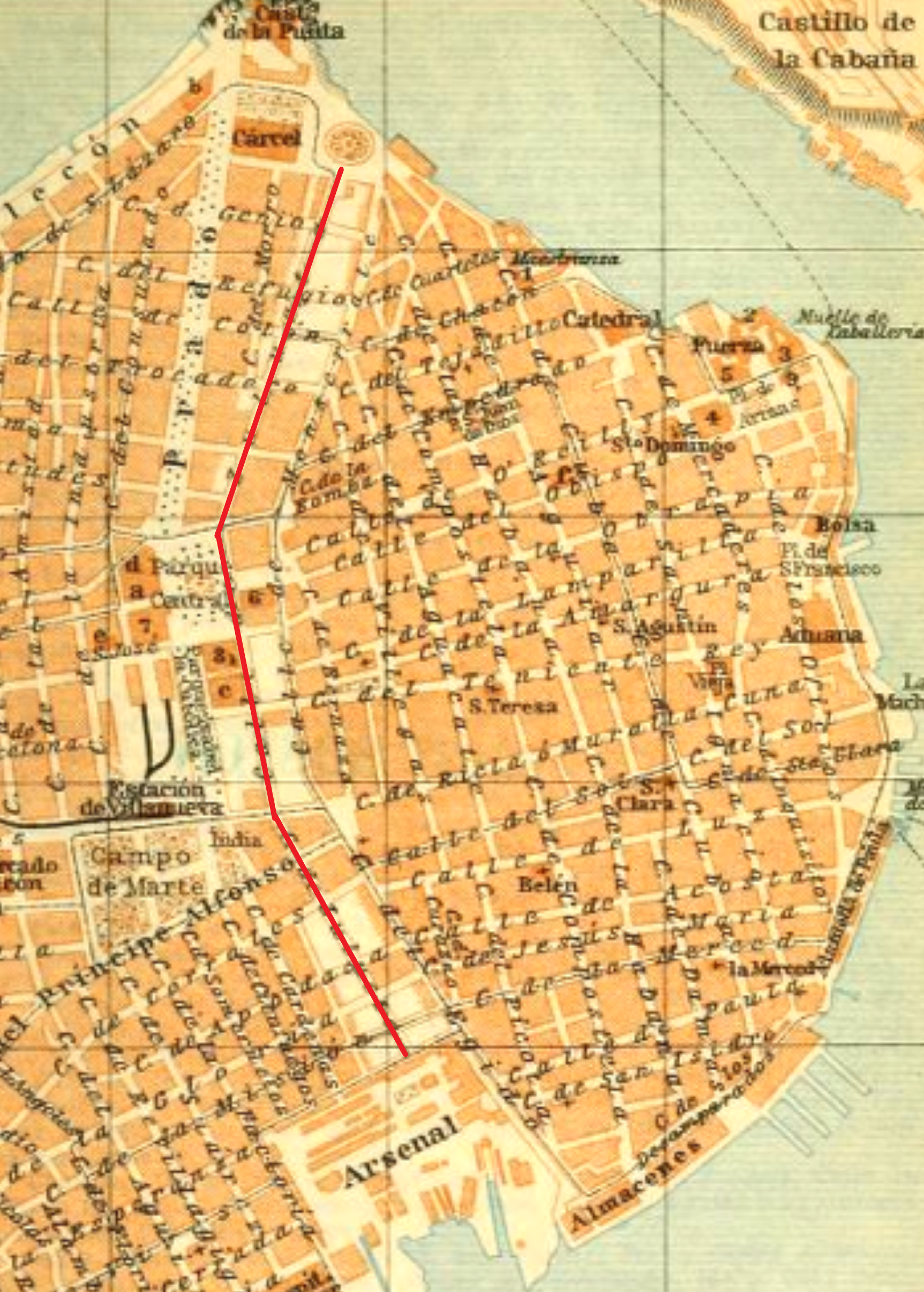
- Calle Zulueta drawn on partal 1909 Habana map by Baedeker
- North end: Caller Arsenal
- Major junctions: Calle Neptuno, Calle Dragones
- South end: Capdevila (Cárcel)

Other
- Known for: Havana walls

Calle Zulueta is a street that follows the exterior line of the old defense wall of Havana, Cuba. It runs south from Calle Arsenal, going slightly southwest, then south at the intersection with Calle Neptuno, then south southeast at Calle Dragones. It marks one of the limits of the Parque Central and passes the Plaza hotel, and the Museo Nacional de Bellas Artes (Trocadero, between Zulueta y Monserrate), Sloppy Joe's bar. It runs parallel to Calle Monserrate.

== History ==
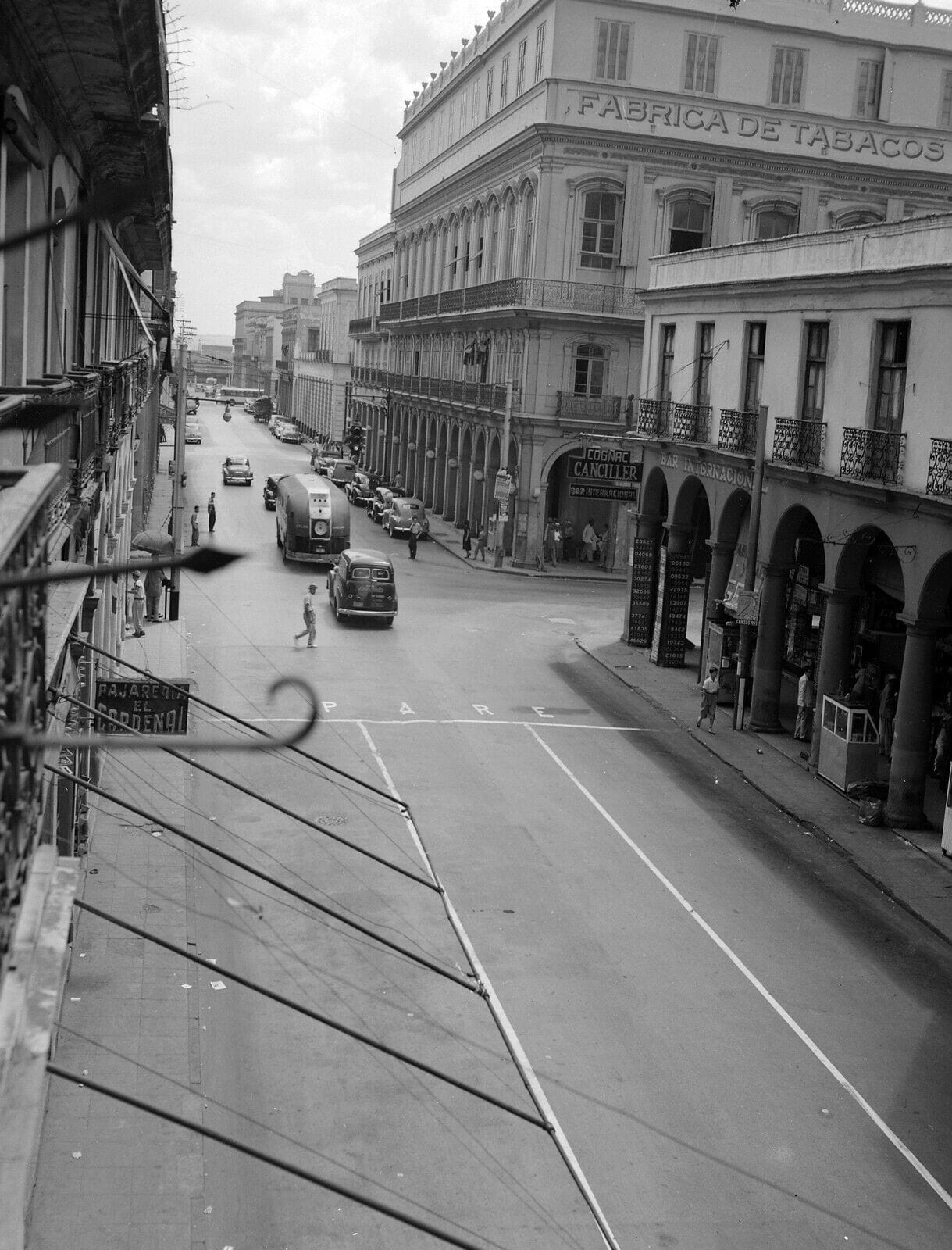
Calle Zulurta at Calle Monte

Calle Zulueta runs north from its southern intersection with Calle Cárcel north to the Havana Central railway station on Calle Arsenal. Calle Ignacio Agramonte is its official name given in 1909, the locals to the present call it by the name it received in 1874: Calle Zulueta.

Its name honors of the potentate Don Julián de Zulueta, 1st Marquis of Álava, a colonel of the Volunteer Corps, president of the Spanish Casino, municipal deputy mayor, interim political governor on several occasions in which he rendered notable services to the city of Havana in terms of charity and public works. Julián Zulueta was a staunch defender of slave trafficking. (Note: Julián Zulueta y Amondo, 1st Marquis of Álava and Viscount of Casa Blanca, was part of a group of the most powerful Spanish slave traders, moneylenders, and landowners, managed to contract the agency for the demolition of the walls of the city, which is why one of the streets through which it extended would be known as Zulueta street.)

== Notable sites ==
- Museum of the Revolution (Cuba)
- Museo Nacional de Bellas Artes de La Habana
- Parque Central, Havana
- Hotel Pasaje, Havana
- Plaza Hotel (Havana)
- Hotel Sevilla
- Sloppy Joe's Bar, Havana

== In literature ==
The main character of Guillermo Cabrera Infante's La Habana para un infante difunto family moves to Calle Zulueta:

== Gallery ==
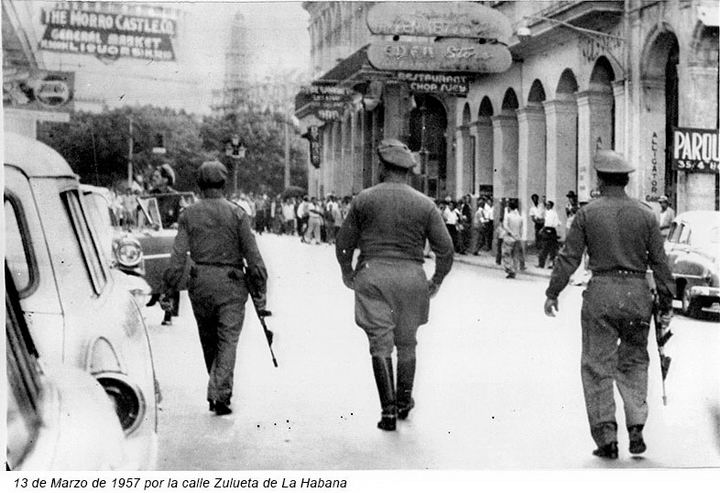
Asalto a Palacio residential, Calle Zulueta

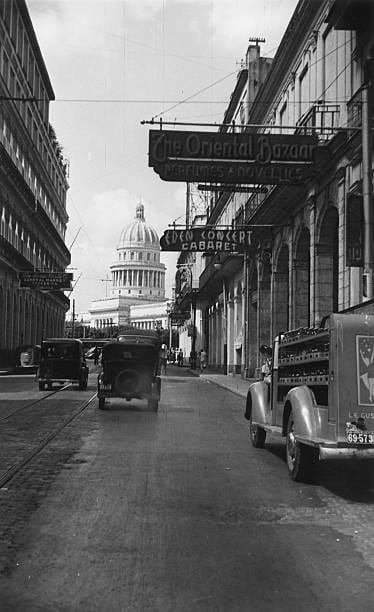
Calle Zulueta nearing El Capitolio

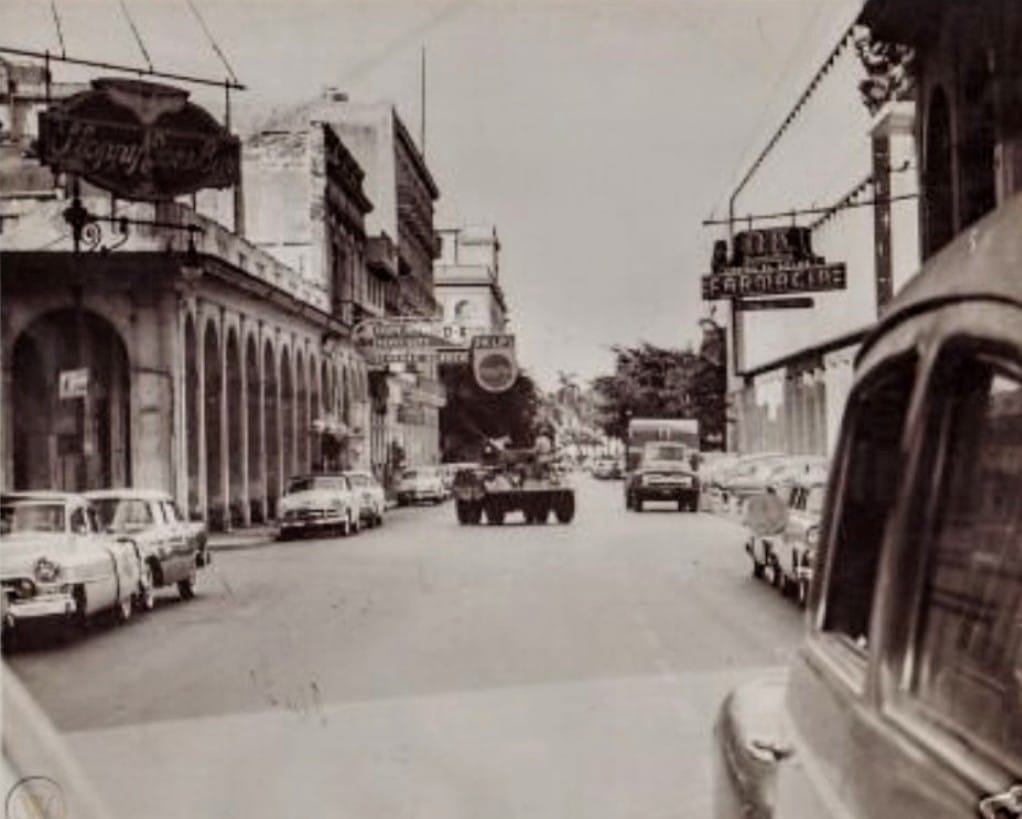
Cuban army vehicle immediately after the attack at Presidential Palace, 13 March 1957

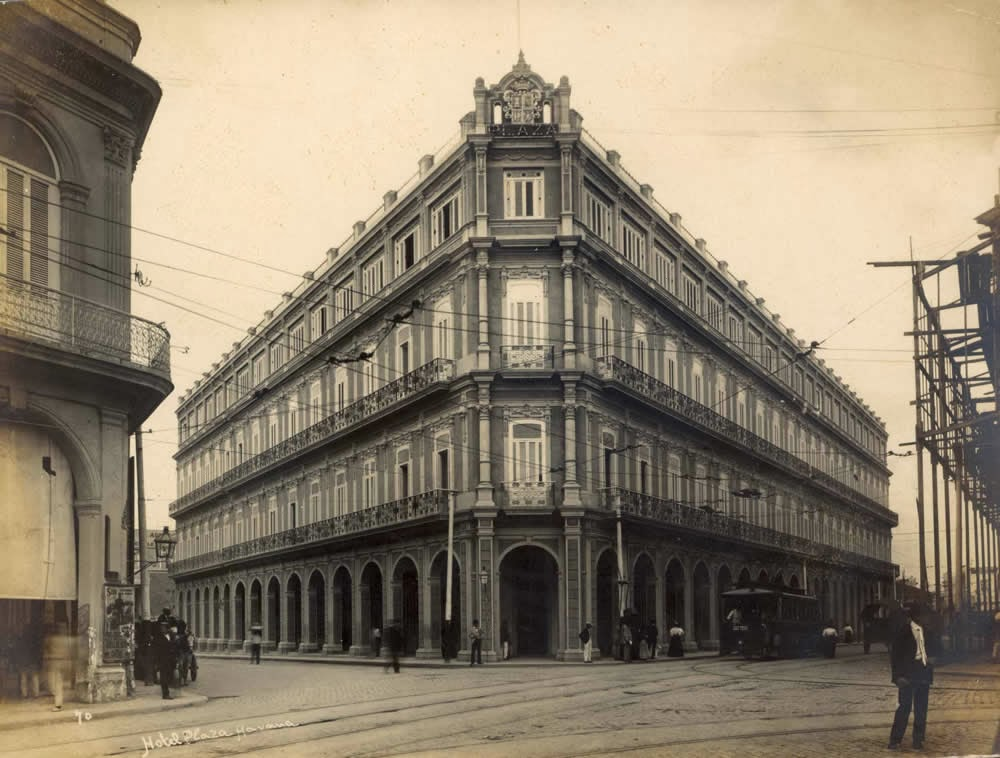
Plaza Hotel (Havana)

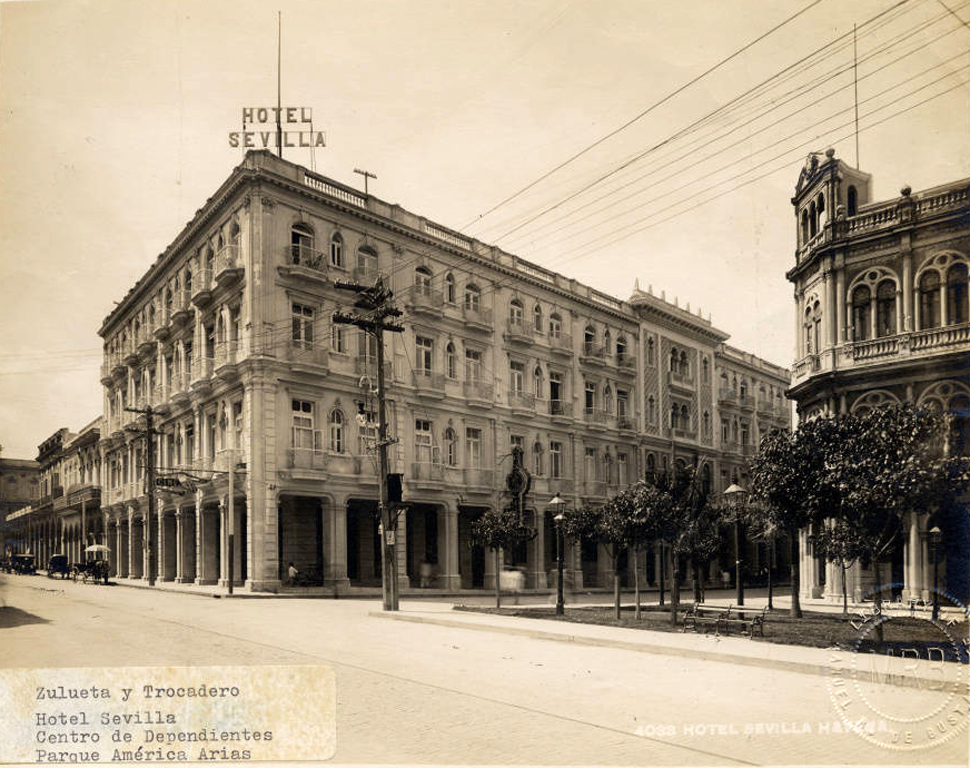
Hotel Sevilla

== See also ==
- Julián de Zulueta, 1st Marquis of Álava
- Havana Presidential Palace attack (1957)
