= Ernesto de Zulueta y Samá =

Spanish politician

Ernesto de Zulueta y Samá (10 July 1855, in La Granja de San Ildefonso – 2 December 1919, in Bilbao), Spanish politician.

Born in La Granja de San Ildefonso, son of Julián de Zulueta, 1st Marquis of Álava (Anúcita, Álava, 8 January 1814 - Havana, 4 May 1878) and first wife (m. Havana, 1 October 1842) Francisca de los Dolores Samá y de la Mota (Trujillo, Badajoz, 4 October 1825 - 12 May 1957).

== Career ==
He was a deputy to the Cortes Generales for Havana, Cuba, for many years.

== Marriage and children ==
He married in Algorta on 5 September 1881 his second and fourth cousin María de Isasi y Murgoitio (Bilbao, 10 September 1854 - 1 January 1934), daughter of Andrés de Isasi, 1st Marquis of Barambio (Barambio, Vitoria-Gasteiz, 1 December 1820 - Bilbao, 29 March 1918) and wife (m. 28 November 1851) Josefa Ceferina de Murgoitio y de Urrecha, Administrator of a Majorat in Durango, who was born in Durango on 25 August 1827 and had issue, including Spanish diplomat Ernesto de Zulueta e Isasi.
