= Eugenio Bustingorri =

Spanish footballer

Personal information
- Full name: Eugenio Bustingorri Oíz
- Date of birth: 28 December 1963 (age 62)
- Place of birth: Zulueta, Spain
- Height: 1.70 m (5 ft 7 in)
- Position: Left-back

Youth career
- 1975–1982: Osasuna

Senior career*
Years	Team	Apps	(Gls)
1982–1984	Osasuna B	62	(10)
1983–1989	Osasuna	180	(15)
1989–1990	Atlético Madrid	28	(1)
1990–1994	Osasuna	144	(4)
1995–1998	Izarra	79	(3)
Total		493	(33)

International career
1980	Spain U16	3	(0)
1985–1986	Spain U21	8	(2)
1990	Basque Country	1	(0)
- * Club domestic league appearances and goals

Eugenio Bustingorri Oíz (born 28 December 1963) is a Spanish former professional footballer who played as a left-back.

He amassed La Liga totals of 343 matches and 20 goals over 11 seasons, almost exclusively with Osasuna.

== Club career ==
Bustingorri was born in Zulueta, Navarre. Save for one year with Atlético Madrid, he spent his entire 16-year career with local giants CA Osasuna, making his first-team – and La Liga – debut on 23 January 1983 in a 1–1 away draw against Valencia CF.

From 1984–85 onwards, Bustingorri was the club's undisputed first-choice, scoring a career-best four goals in 42 games (including two in the promotion/relegation playoffs, all starts) in 1986–87 in an eventual narrow escape from relegation. After returning from Atlético in 1989, he retained its starting position: on 26 May 1991, he scored one of his two goals in the season in a 1–0 away win against RCD Español, as his side finished a best-ever fourth and qualified for the second time in their history for the UEFA Cup; for his efforts, he was named best left-back in the league by Mundo Deportivo.

Bustingorri left Osasuna midway through the 1994–95 campaign, with the team now in the Segunda División. He went on play three years with neighbouring CD Izarra, being the player with the second-most matches in the top flight for the former.

== International career ==
Bustingorri earned caps for Spain at two youth levels, and participated at the 1986 UEFA European Under-21 Championship as the national team finished as champions.

== Honours ==
Spain U21

- UEFA European Under-21 Championship: 1986
