= Xavier Mina =

Spanish lawyer and army officer

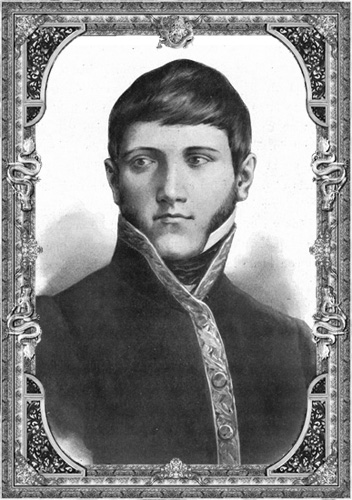
- Portrait of Xavier Mina, Lithograph
- Born: Martín Xavier Mina y Larrea; 1 July 1789; Otano, Kingdom of Navarre, Spain
- Died: 11 November 1817 (aged 28); Cerro del Bellaco, Kingdom of Mexico, Viceroyalty of New Spain (now Cuerámaro, Guanajuato, Mexico)
- Cause of death: Execution by firing squad
- Resting place: Column of Independence
- Occupations: Lawyer; Military officer
- Military career
- Allegiance: Spain; Mexican Insurgency
- Service years: 1808–1817
- Rank: Colonel (Spain); General (Insurgency)
- Nicknames: El Mozo; El Estudiante
- Units: Corso Terrestre de Navarra (Spain); División Auxiliar de la República Mexicana (Insurgency)
- Battles: Peninsular War; Skirmish of Alcañiz; Battle of Tudela; Mexican War of Independence; Siege of Soto la Marina; Battle of Valle de Maíz; Battle of Peotillos; Battle of Los Arrastraderos; Battle of Fuerte del Sombrero; Battle of San Diego de la Unión; Skirmish at El Venadito

Martín Xavier Mina y Larrea (1 July 1789 – 11 November 1817), usually called Xavier Mina or Francisco Xavier Mina and nicknamed El Mozo (“the Younger”) or El Estudiante (“the Student”), was a liberal Navarrese lawyer and guerrilla commander in the Peninsular War, and of the short-lived División Auxiliar de la República Mexicana during the Mexican War of Independence.

Captured by French troops in 1810, he was influenced by French liberalism and became an opponent of the restored absolutism of Ferdinand VII. After a failed pronunciamiento in 1814 he when into exile to England, from where he organized an expedition in support of Mexican independence, landing on the coast of present-day Tamaulipas in April 1817. After a campaign of six months in the Bajío he was taken at the ranch of El Venadito and shot as a traitor at Cerro del Bellaco.

On 19 July 1823 the Mexican Constituent Congress declared him benemérito de la patria en grado heroico in the same decree that honoured Miguel Hidalgo, José María Morelos and others. His remains were later placed in the Column of Independence in Mexico City.

== Name ==
He signed proclamations and correspondence as Xavier Mina. Mexican usage long added Francisco, the given name of his uncle Francisco Espoz y Mina, who adopted the surname Mina after the nephew’s capture in 1810. Modern Mexican scholarship prefers the baptismal form Martín Xavier Mina y Larrea and treats “Francisco Xavier Mina” as a later conflation.

== Early life ==
Mina was born on 1 July 1789, at Otano, a village in the valley of Elorz near Pamplona, Navarre, the son of Juan José Mina Espoz, a prosperous farmer, and María Andrés Larrea. From about the age of eleven he lived in Pamplona with his uncle Clemente and aunt Simona Espoz and studied Latin, mathematics and the humanities at the seminary there. At eighteen he went to Zaragoza to read law at the university.

== Peninsular War ==
The French occupation of 1808 ended his legal studies. Mina left Zaragoza, returned to Navarre and raised a small guerrilla band that grew into the Corso Terrestre de Navarra. By 1809–1810 the force numbered on the order of 1,200 infantry and 150 horse and fought at points including Lumbier, Estella, Urbasa, Mendigorría, Sangüesa and Tudela. In March 1810 he was captured near Labiano and sent to France. He spent four years as a state prisoner, principally at Vincennes, and was released in April 1814 after the fall of Napoleon.

== Prison, return and the 1814 pronunciamiento ==
Francisco Xavier Mina's Equestrian state portrait, Art piece located at Amsterdam's Rijksmuseum.

At Vincennes he continued military and mathematical study and came under the influence of French liberal officers, among them General Victor Claude Alexandre Fanneau de Lahorie. Ferdinand VII, restored in 1814, abolished the Spanish Constitution of 1812. Mina was commissioned colonel of Navarrese hussars but joined the liberal opposition. In September 1814 he and his uncle attempted a pronunciamiento at Pamplona intended to reopen the city as an asylum for the defenders of the Cádiz constitution. The plot failed. Mina fled through France to England.

== Exile and organization of the expedition ==
In London he moved in the circle of Spanish and Spanish-American liberals around José María Blanco White, Álvaro Flórez Estrada and Servando Teresa de Mier. Mier pressed the case of the Mexican insurgency after the execution of José María Morelos in 1815; Mina presented the American war as a continuation of the struggle against Ferdinand’s absolutism. Private English backers and Spanish-American agents in the United States, among them Manuel Torres, José Rafael Revenga and Pedro Gual, helped finance a crossing.

In May 1816 Mina, Mier and a group of officers sailed from Liverpool in the frigate Caledonia and reached Norfolk, Virginia, at the end of June. From Baltimore the project moved south to Haiti, where Alexandre Pétion gave assistance and Mina met Simón Bolívar, then to Galveston Island, then held by the French privateer under Mexican commission Louis-Michel Aury. Aury took naval command; Mina took the troops. The force that left Galveston in early April 1817 was on the order of 250–300 men of mixed Spanish, English, Irish, Italian, French, U.S. and Caribbean origin, aboard vessels that included Cleopatra, Neptune and Congreso Mexicano.

== Mexican War of Independence, 1817 ==
=== Landing at Soto la Marina ===
Traditional Mexican commemoration, following the contemporary narrative of William Davis Robinson, dates the landing at Soto la Marina, at the mouth of the Santander River, to 15 April 1817. Pérez Rodríguez, using the expedition diaries and Mier’s memoirs, places Cleopatra off Soto la Marina on 19 April and the joint disembarkation on the morning of 21 April. The town was taken with little resistance. Mina left a garrison under Major José Sardá, brought ashore a press and with Boston printer Samuel Bangs, on 25 April issued a proclamation stating that he fought the tyranny of Ferdinand VII, not Spanish sovereignty in America, and asking Mexicans to count him among their compatriots.

A passage of the 25 April text reads:

Mexicans: allow me to take part in your glorious endeavors; accept the services I offer you in support of your noble cause; and count me among your compatriots. May I prove worthy of this title, either by ensuring that your freedom prevails or by sacrificing my own life for it!

=== Inland march ===
On 24 May Mina left the coast with some 300 men and drove inland toward the Bajío, hoping to link with the remaining insurgent forces after the death of Morelos. In June he won a series of actions:

- Battle of Valle del Maíz, 6 June
- Battle of Peotillos, 15 June
- actions around Real de Catorce / Real de Pinos
- Battle of Los Arrastraderos

On 24 June 1817 he reached the Fuerte del Sombrero, held by Pedro Moreno, and the two commanders joined forces. Both recognized the authority of the Junta de Jaujilla, the provisional insurgent government established after Morelos’s death and based in a fort on the lagoons of Zacapu, Michoacán. The Junta exercised nominal authority over remaining forces in Michoacán and Guanajuato. Mina informed the Junta of his arrival, accepted its government, and was authorized to hold the rank of mariscal de campo, although he continued to style himself general of the División Auxiliar de la República Mexicana. The Junta also ratified the arrangements he had made and confirmed Moreno as mariscal with command of the province of San Luis Potosí.

Field Marshal Pascual Liñán brought a royalist army against Mina and Moreno in early August and besieged the Fuerte del Sombrero. On 4 August the defenders repulsed a direct assault by Liñán’s forces with heavy losses to the attackers. Mina later cut his way out of the siege to seek help and fell back on the Fuerte de los Remedios to support José Antonio Torres. An earlier attempt on the city of León had failed. Despite the successful repulse of 4 August, lack of water and supplies forced the remaining defenders to abandon Sombrero on the night of 19–20 August; Moreno escaped the chaotic withdrawal, while Liñán’s troops occupied the fort on 20 August, ordered its demolition, and executed the prisoners found inside. Moreno later rejoined Mina in the Bajío, and the two commanders remained together through the subsequent operations. In mid-October 1817 Mina visited the Junta at Jaujilla. From there, on 19 October, he issued a proclamation addressed to Spaniards, urging them to join the Mexican struggle against the despotism of Ferdinand VII. In the same text he guaranteed the intentions of independence held by the Mexican provisional government, stated that America would be free, and argued that a free Mexico would help liberate Spain from the Bourbons as well. The Junta recommended concentrating operations in the Tierra Caliente, where royalist control was weaker. Mina instead attempted a surprise attack on Guanajuato on the night of 24 October; the force was dispersed, and he and Moreno withdrew toward the ranch of El Venadito.

== Capture and execution ==
On the morning of 27 October 1817, royalist troops under Colonel Francisco de Orrantia surprised Mina and Moreno at El Venadito. Moreno was killed; Mina was taken alive, sent first to Colonel Orrantia at Silao and then to Liñán. He was not tried in Mexico City. Viceroy Juan Ruiz de Apodaca ordered that the execution not be delayed. Apodaca was later given the royal title of Count of Venadito, taking the title from the place of the capture.

On 11 November 1817, about four in the afternoon, Mina was shot by the Batallón de Zaragoza on the crest of Cerro del Bellaco, facing the fort of Los Remedios, on the Pénjamo–Cuerámaro line in Guanajuato. He was 28. Royalist practice treated him as a traitor: he was shot in the back. Contemporary and later accounts agree that he asked the firing party to aim well and spare him a lingering death.

By the time of his death the coastal fort at Soto la Marina had already fallen; Mier was captured there and sent to Perote and the Inquisition prison in Mexico City.

== Honors and legacy ==
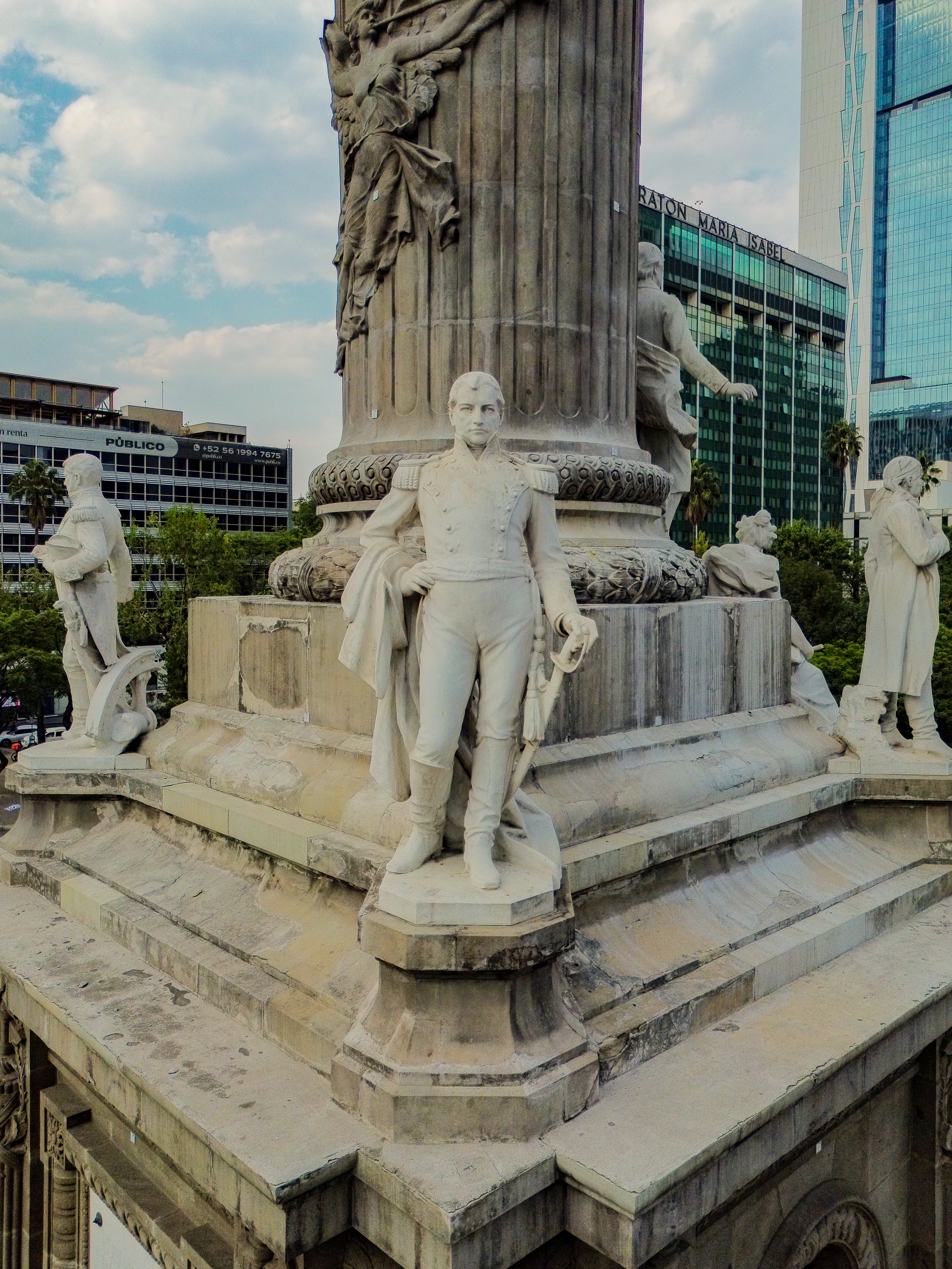
Sculpture of Mina at the Angel of Independence, Mexico City.

Spanish historiography long folded him into the biography of his uncle Espoz y Mina or passed him over; Mexican civic ritual placed him with the padres de la patria.

Article 13 of the decree of 19 July 1823, issued by the Sovereign Mexican Congress, declared Mina amongst others a “benemérito de la patria” Article 14 ordered the exhumation of their remains and their deposit in a chest whose key was to be kept in the congressional archive.”

Mina’s body was exhumed in August 1823 from the ground at Cerro del Bellaco and taken, with other remains, toward Mexico City. They were deposited with ceremony in the metropolitan cathedral. In the twentieth century the ashes of the beneméritos were transferred to the Column of Independence on Paseo de la Reforma, where a statue of Mina forms part of the sculptural programme.

In Mexican official memory, the weight of Mina’s six-month campaign is that it reopened a war that royalist authorities had treated as nearly finished after 1815 and that a Spanish liberal died in it as an insurgent. Historian Guadalupe Jiménez Codinach has called the neglect of Mina a standing debt in Mexican public history.

Places and objects named for him include:

- the municipality of Mina, Nuevo León, renamed from San Francisco de Cañas on March 31, 1851;
- General Francisco Javier Mina International Airport (TAM) at Tampico;
- the 2008 five-peso coin in the bicentennial independence series;
- a brief Texas place-name: the town later restored as Bastrop, Texas, was called Mina in the 1830s.
