= Pedro Faife =

Cuban footballer (born 1984)

Personal information
- Full name: Pedro Adriani Faife Fernández
- Date of birth: January 14, 1984 (age 42)
- Place of birth: Zulueta, Cuba
- Height: 5 ft 7 in (1.70 m)
- Position: Midfielder

Youth career
- Villa Clara

Senior career*
Years	Team	Apps	(Gls)
2004–2008	Villa Clara		
2009	Miami FC	14	(0)

International career^{‡}
2003–2008	Cuba	39	(2)
- * Club domestic league appearances and goals as of 22 October 2009 ‡ National team caps and goals as of 20 May 2009

Pedro Adriani Faife Fernández (born January 1, 1984, in Zulueta) is a Cuban football player who once played for Miami FC in the USL First Division.

== Club career ==
Faife began his soccer career with his hometown team, Villa Clara, and played with the team until his defection to the United States in 2008, helping the team win the Campeonato Nacional de Fútbol de Cuba in 2004.

Faife defected from Cuba to the United States in 2008 in the hope of a securing professional career. Following his defection he trialed with several Major League Soccer clubs, including Chivas USA, but was not offered an MLS contract, and instead joined Miami FC of the USL First Division for the 2009 season.

== International career ==
Faife was a member of Cuba's under 17 and 23 teams and in 2003 made his debut for the senior Cuba national team in a June 2003 friendly match against Panama. Faife subsequently made 35 appearances for the team over the next six years, but is not expected to make any more appearances for the national team since his defection to the United States. He was part of the Cuban squad at the 2003 CONCACAF Gold Cup, the 2005 CONCACAF Gold Cup, and the 2007 CONCACAF Gold Cup and represented his country in 6 FIFA World Cup qualifying matches.

His final international was a September 2008 FIFA World Cup qualification match against Guatemala.

=== International goals ===
Scores and results list Cuba's goal tally first.

Number	Date	Location	Opponent	Score	Result	Competition
1	20 May 2004	Estadio Pedro Marrero, Havana, Cuba	Grenada	2-0	2-2	Friendly match
2	12 December 2004	Estadio Pedro Marrero, Havana, Cuba	Martinique	1-0	2-0	2005 Caribbean Cup

== Personal life ==
=== Defection to the United States ===
Faife defected to the United States when he disappeared from his hotel outside of Washington, D.C. before a CONCACAF 3rd round World Cup qualifier against the United States on 11 October 2008.

== See also ==
- Zulueta (Remedios)
