= Andrés de Isasi, 1st Marquis of Barambio =

Andrés de Isasi y de Zulueta, 1st Marquess of Barambio (Barambio, Vitoria-Gasteiz, 1 December 1820 – Bilbao, 29 March 1918), of Basque descent.

Born in Barambio, Vitoria-Gasteiz, son of Pedro de Isasi y de Orúe, de Perea y de Zulueta and wife and cousin Manuela de Zulueta y de Salcedo, de Lezameta y Ugarte and a first cousin of Julián de Zulueta y Amondo, 1st Marquis of Álava & 1st Viscount of Casablanca.

== Career ==
He received the title of 1st Marquess of Barambio.

== Marriage and children ==
He married on 28 November 1851 Josefa Ceferina de Murgoitio y de Urrecha, Administrator of a Majorat in Durango, of Basque descent (Durango, 25 August 1827 -), daughter of José María de Murgoitio, born in Durango, and wife Manuela de Urrecha, born in Bergüenda, and had issue, including a daughter María de Isasi y Murgoitio (Bilbao, 10 September 1854 – 1 November 1934), who married in Algorta on 5 September 1881 her second and fourth cousin Spanish Politician Ernesto de Zulueta y Samá (La Granja de San Ildefonso, 10 July 1855 – Bilbao, 2 December 1919).
