= Ernesto de Zulueta e Isasi =

Spanish diplomat

Ernesto de Zulueta e Isasi (26 April 1892, in Bilbao – 9 September 1969, in Madrid), Spanish diplomat.

Born in Bilbao, son of Ernesto de Zulueta y Samá (La Granja de San Ildefonso, 10 July 1855 - Bilbao, 2 December 1919), of the Marquesses of Álava and Viscounts of Casa Blanca, and wife and cousin (m. Algorta, 5 September 1881) María de Isasi y Murgoitio (Bilbao, 10 September 1854 - 1 November 1934), of the Marquesses of Barambio.

== Career ==
He was Ambassador of Spain in Stockholm, Chief of Diplomatic Cabinet, Counselor at the Embassy of Spain in Buenos Aires, etc. He was made Grand Cross of the Order of Civil Merit of Spain and Knight Grand Cross of the First Class the Order of St. Gregory the Great of the Holy See, and Commander of the Order of Christ of Portugal, the Order of Charles III, etc.

== Marriage and children ==
He married in Paris on 25 April 1922 María de la Concepción Dato y Barrenechea (Madrid, 2 May 1890 - Madrid, 16 September 1973), daughter of Eduardo Dato e Iradier (A Coruña, 12 August 1856 - Madrid, 8 March 1921) and wife María de Barrenechea, 1st Duchess of Dato, who died in Madrid in 1926, and had issue, including Spanish Diplomat Eduardo de Zulueta y Dato.
