= Imárcoain =

- Council
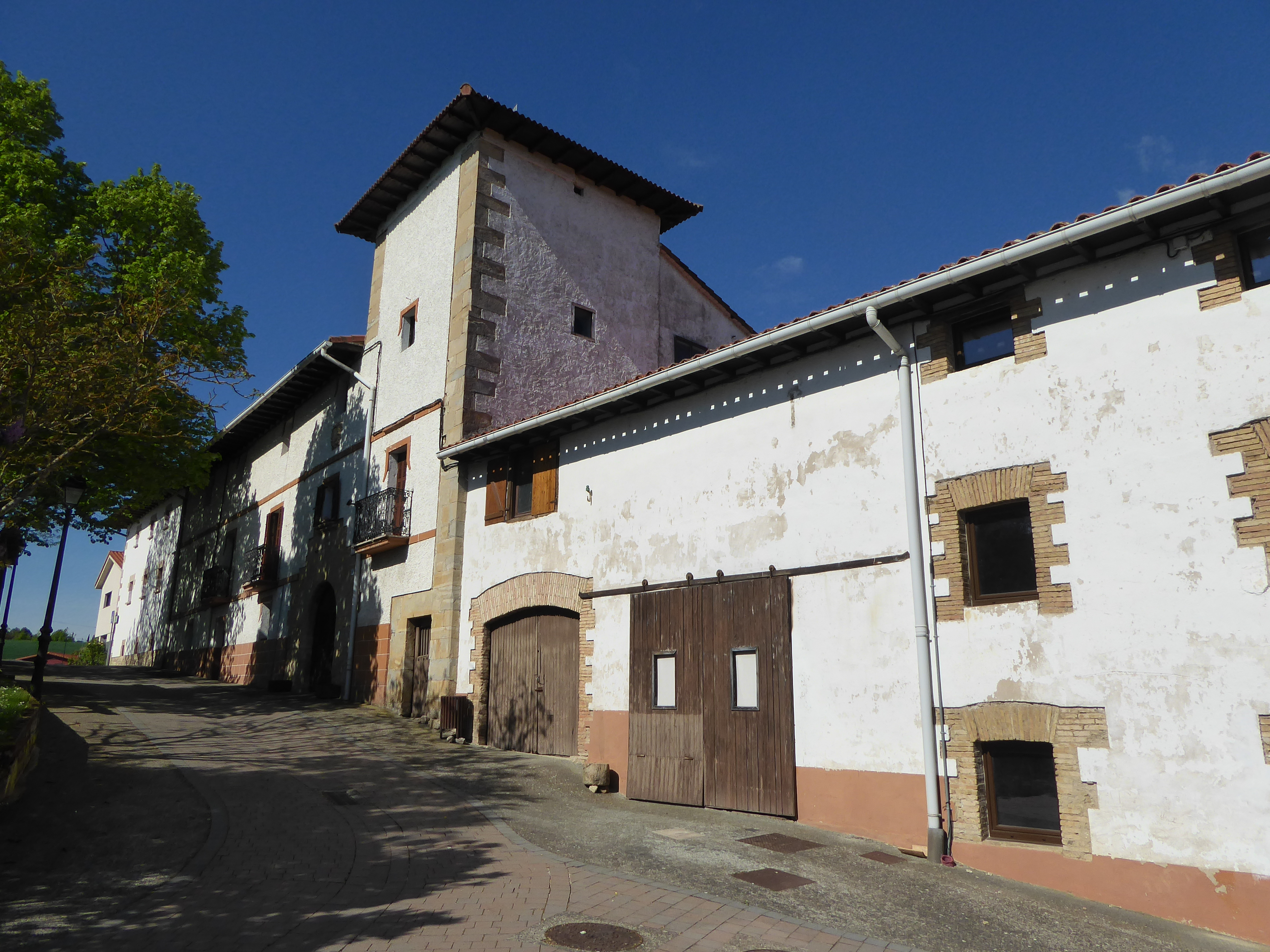

- Location within Navarre Location within Spain
- Coordinates: 42°44′11″N 1°36′50″W
- Country: Spain
- Community: Navarre
- Province: Navarre
- Municipality: Noáin
- Elevation: 469 m (1,539 ft)

Population
  - Total: 408

Imárcoain is a locality and council located in the municipality of Noáin, in Navarre province, Spain, Spain. As of 2020, it has a population of 408.

== Geography ==
Imárcoain is located 11km south-southeast of Pamplona.
