= Rolando Reyes Sr. =

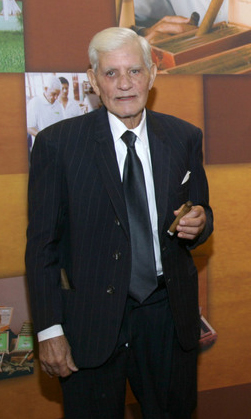
- Born: 1924; Zulueta, nr. Remedios, Las Villas Province, now in Villa Clara Province, Cuba
- Died: March 18, 2012
- Occupation(s): Cigar Maker: Master blender & roller; businessman
- Spouse: Zeida ( ) Reyes
- Children: 3

Don Rolando Reyes Sr. was a well-known Honduran cigar maker of Cuban origin formerly residing in Danlí, Honduras. He was a master blender, roller and is the creator of Cuba Aliados, Puros Indios and other cigar brands.

== Early life ==
Rolando Reyes was born in 1924 into a large family of fourteen (seven boys and seven girls), in Zulueta, Las Villas Province, Cuba (now in Villa Clara Province). His father owned a trucking business, but unlike his siblings, he wished to become a tabacalero, a tobacconist. At nine years old, Rolando was apprenticed to Silvio Santana of the Tabacalera Pequeña in Zulueta, where he was taught all aspects of cigar making. He went to school at 8 in the morning until noon, and then worked in the factory from 1 (1300 hrs) in the afternoon until 9 at night (2100 hrs). After two years at Tabacalera Pequeña, he left there to work in the Aquilar factory in nearby Remedios.

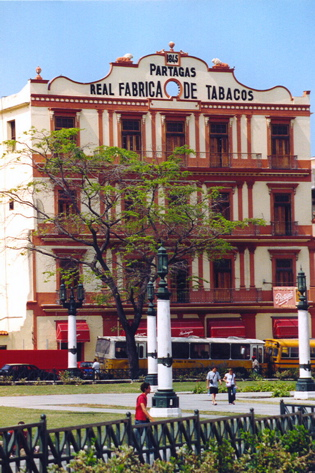
Partagás factory, Havana Cuba

== Developing a Career in the Cigar Industry ==
In 1938, at the age of 14, he went to work at the José L. Piedra Cigar Factory in Guanajay, Pinar del Río Province, but later moved to Havana, Cuba to begin work at the H. Upmann factory. After leaving Upmann, he went to work in various factories, including José Gener, Partagàs, Romeo y Julieta and then he worked for the Batet Cigar Co. It was in these factories that he learned to roll the parejo (straight-sided) cigars. He learned to roll more complex and difficult figurados (shaped cigars), such as pyramides at the Josè Gener factory. He was able also to master the technique of rolling cigars without a mold and other techniques as well., He was later the first to offer the complex diadema (a large figurado) to the U. S. market.

== Striking Out on His Own ==
In 1945, barely 21 years of age, Rolando moved to Placetas, Las Villas province, and established his own factory, Los Aliados. After a few years, he moved his factory to Havana where he operated successfully until 1968 when the Communist government of Fidel Castro confiscated his Los Aliados trademark, his factory and his personal belongings. At the time of the takeover, the factory was turning out 6 million hand-made cigars for the domestic market. The new government assigned him to work in the El Rey del Mundo cigar factory, but he refused so he was sent to the rice fields where he worked until he was able to emigrate to the United States.

== Starting Anew ==
In 1971, Rolando Reyes Sr. was able to emigrate to the United States, arriving first in Miami, Florida. A short time later, with a $500 loan from his brother, he re-located his family to Jersey City, New Jersey and opened a small cigar shop. He worked in a clothing factory during the day (knitting) to earn extra money to support his family and rolled cigars for sale in his shop in the evenings. The Jersey City location soon proved to be too small, so in 1973, he built a combination house/factory in Union City and moved his family and cigar production there changing the name of his cigar to Cuba Aliados. The company continues to operate offices in Union City.

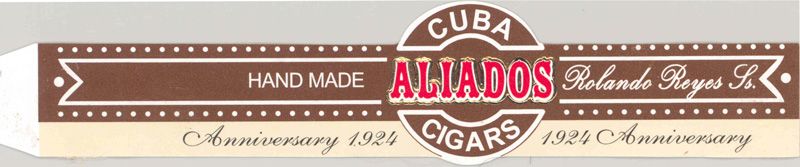
Cuba Aliados Anniversary 1924 cigar band. _{Image by Richard L. Hardesty}

The newly re-christened cigar was picked up by a national distributor (Cigars by Santa Clara). To keep up with the increased demand, in 1978, Reyes Sr. began production of Cuba Aliados in the Dominican Republic. Unsatisfied with the quality of the resultant cigars, he closed his Dominican operation and opened a new factory and retail operation in Miami, Florida in 1984, and cigar production continued in both Union City and Miami until all production moved to Honduras.

== The Advent of Puros Indios ==
The success of the Cuba Aliados brand had its bumps due to litigation with JR Cigars that built a gap between Rolando Reyes Jr. and Rolando Reyes Sr. A new brand, Puros Indios, was introduced in late 1995 by Rolando Reyes Jr. Rolando Reyes Jr. Promoted came out with the Puros Indios name. It was under Puros Indios Cigars that Rolando Reyes Jr purchased the 35 Acre land in the Redlands. He promoted the Puros Indios Cigars and it was not well accepted by the Cuba Aliados Cigars Distributor known as JR. Distributors. resulting in the removal of that brand from the market for several years, leaving the company with only the new brand, Puros Indios, which was successful. In February 1996, Rolando Reyes Jr. formed a new company, Puros Indios Cigars, Inc., which took over the production and distribution of the Puros Indios brand. The dispute and lawsuit also resulted in a permanent rift between father and son, Rolando Reyes Jr., who departed and went his own way due to ongoing disputes with older sister Oneida. Oneida wanted to keep the company and all of the family inheritance to herself.

== Honduras ==
A visit to Honduras convinced Reyes Sr. to move most of his operations to Danlí, Honduras, the move was completed in 1989. The factory was an old building that had originally been a twelve-room motel. This factory was in use for fourteen years. It eventually became too small, until a new, fully modern factory was built on the outskirts of Danlĺ, which opened in 2002. The old factory continues to serve as a box factory and as an aging facility for finished cigars.

The new Puros Indios factory allowed for an immediate increase in production to three times what the old factory could produce, turning out 30,000 cigars per day. The rolling room, with room for 160 rollers, occupies the entire bottom floor. The second floor consists of 15 bulk tobacco storage rooms, seven cedar-lined aging rooms and three walk-in freezers for killing tobacco pests such as the Tobacco Beetle.

The factory sits on a 5-acre (20,000 m^{2}) plot of land adjacent to the Reyes residence and farm, where Don Rolando grows food for himself and his family. He also often shares the output from this farm with his workers. Even at his advanced age (he turned 84 in 2007), Don Rolando works in the factory. Even though he works during the day, he also works after everyone else has gone home and he has the factory to himself, usually starting at 10 PM (2200 hrs) and often working to 5:00 AM (0500 hrs) the following morning. He prefers this time because it makes it easier to work without interruption. He inspects the day's production and if a roller fails to make cigars to quality standard, Don Rolando will leave the roller a cautionary note to improve.

== Changes ==
In late 2007, Don Rolando announced he was promoting his grandson, Carlos E. Diez, to be the company president. After many years doing business as Puros Indios Cigars, Inc., the new president changed the company name to Reyes Family Cigars, Inc., introduced a new corporate logo, cigar label art, and added three new cigar lines under the Reyes Family Cigar brand among other significant changes.
