= Yárnoz =

- Locality
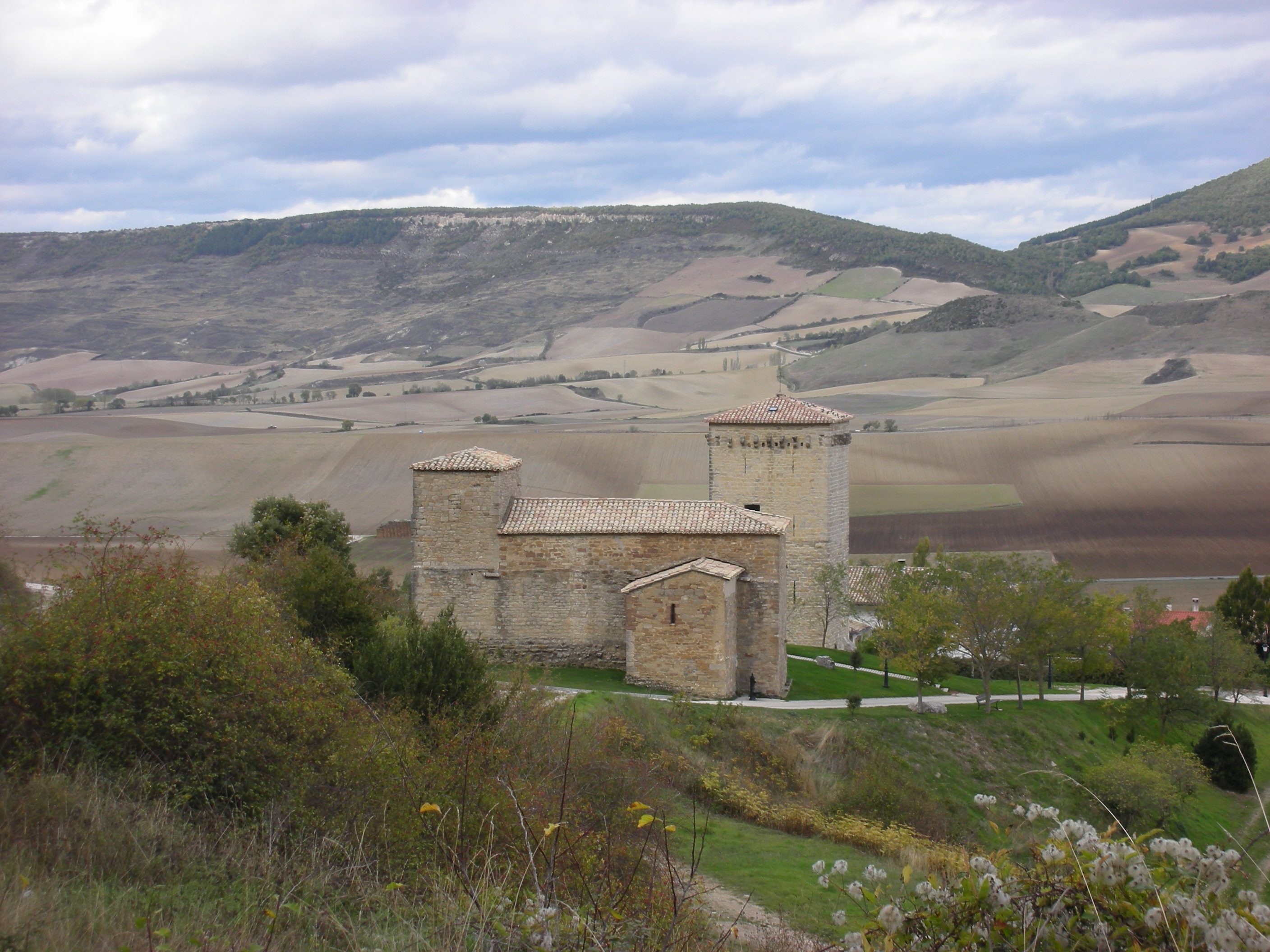

- Location within Navarre Location within Spain
- Coordinates: 42°42′46″N 1°32′56″W
- Country: Spain
- Community: Navarre
- Province: Navarre
- Municipality: Noáin

Population
  - Total: 22

Yárnoz is a locality located in the municipality of Noáin, in Navarre province, Spain, Spain. As of 2020, it has a population of 22.

== Geography ==
Yárnoz is located 18km southeast of Pamplona.
