= Torres de Elorz =

- Council
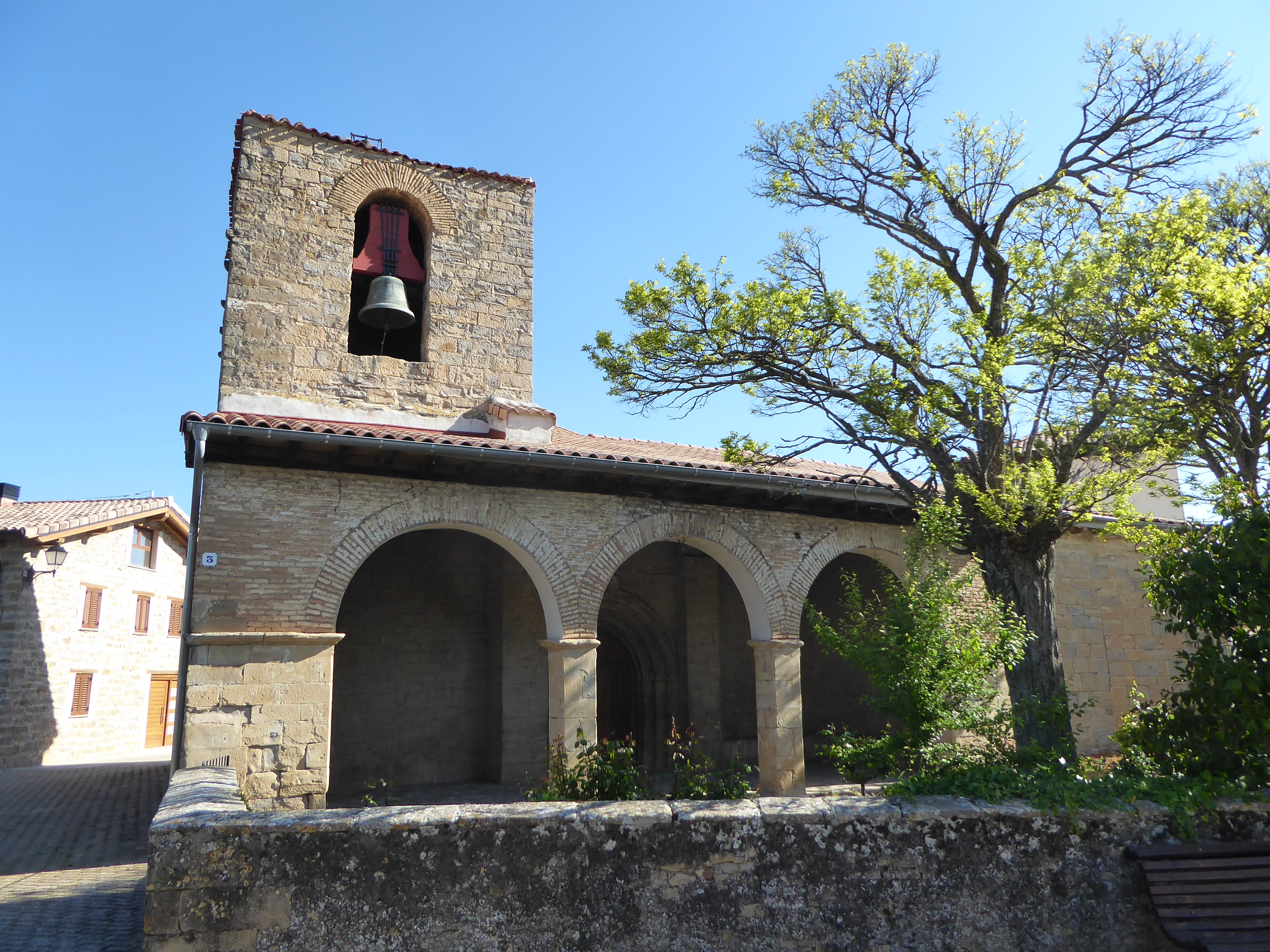

- Location within Navarre Location within Spain
- Coordinates: 42°44′0″N 1°33′41″W
- Country: Spain
- Community: Navarre
- Province: Navarre
- Municipality: Noáin
- Elevation: 490 m (1,610 ft)

Population
  - Total: 288

Torres de Elorz is a locality and council located in the municipality of Noáin, in Navarre province, Spain, Spain. As of 2020, it has a population of 288.

== Geography ==
Torres de Elorz is located 14km southeast of Pamplona.
