= Otano, Navarre =

Otano
- Locality
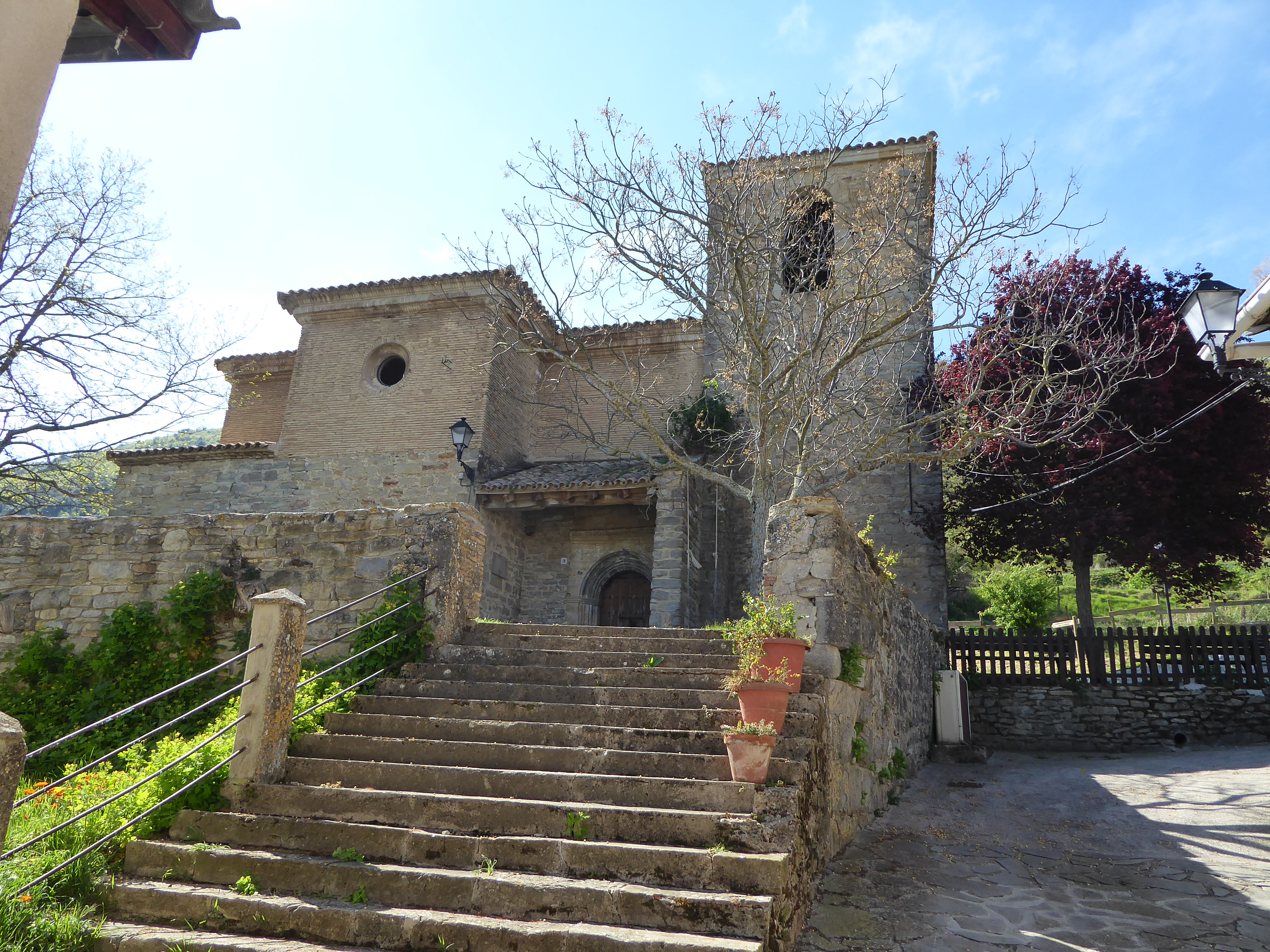

- Location within Navarre Location within Spain
- Coordinates: 42°42′49″N 1°34′6″W
- Country: Spain
- Community: Navarre
- Province: Navarre
- Municipality: Noáin
- Elevation: 517 m (1,696 ft)

Population
  - Total: 7

Otano, known in Basque as Otao, is a hamlet located in the municipality of Noáin, in Navarre province, Spain. As of 2020, it has a population of 7.

== Geography ==
Otano is located 20 km south-southeast of Pamplona, in the valley of the river Elorz on the slopes of Mount Alaiz.

== History ==
Otano had a population of 64 in 1802. It stands on the pilgrimage route the Camino de Santiago, which forms its main street. The village belonged in the Middle Ages to the Knights Hospitaller. Although reduced in population it is a parish, of which the 16th-century church is dedicated either to San Salvador or to the Ascension. There are also elements of a Romanesque bridge incorporated into the present one over the river Elorz.

Martín Javier Mina y Larrea was born in the hamlet in 1789.
