= Guerendiáin =

- Council
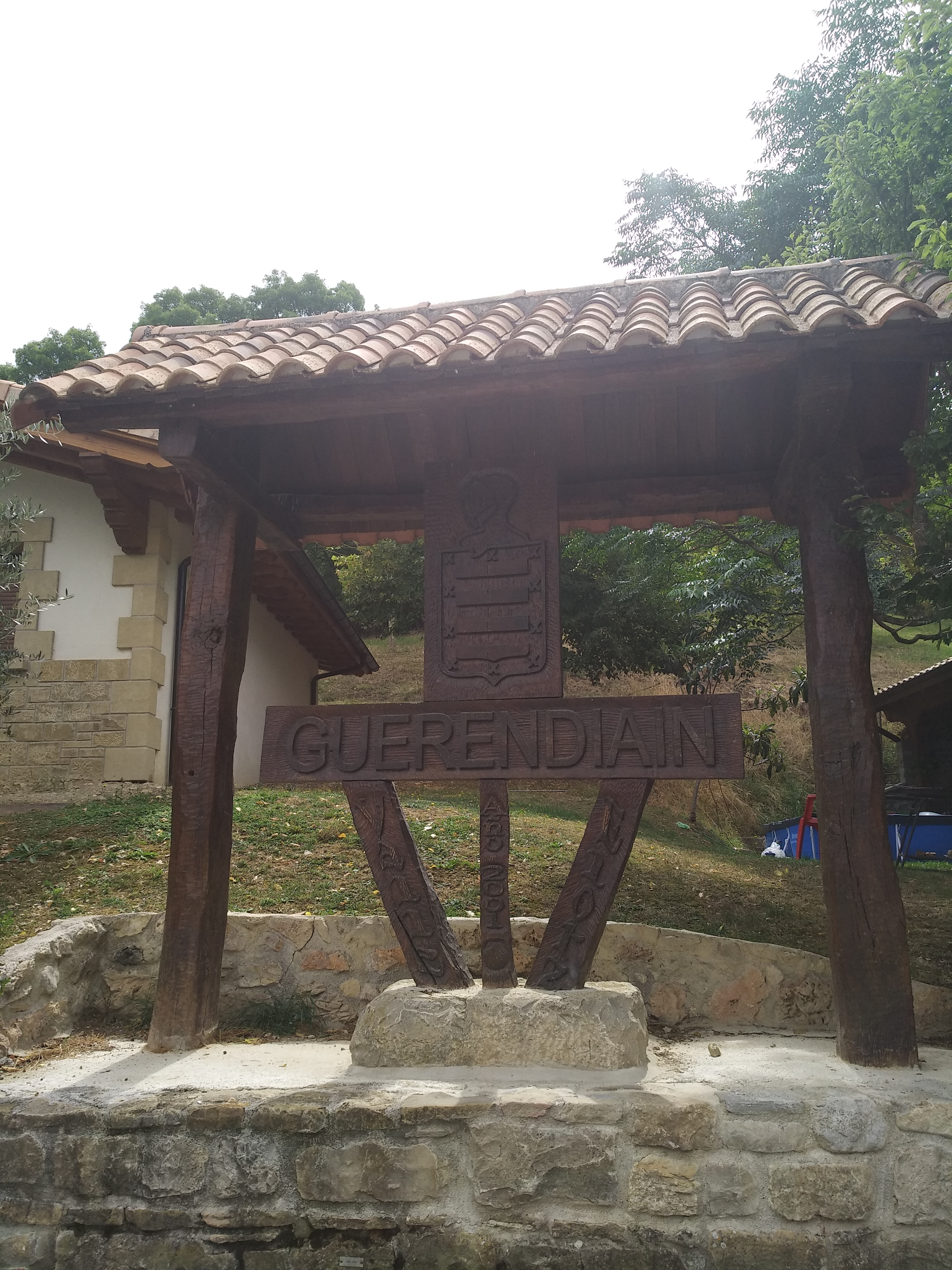

- Location within Navarre Location within Spain
- Coordinates: 42°42′22″N 1°36′9″W
- Country: Spain
- Community: Navarre
- Province: Navarre
- Municipality: Noáin
- Elevation: 589 m (1,932 ft)

Population
  - Total: 24

Guerendiáin is a locality and council located in the municipality of Noáin, in Navarre province, Spain. As of 2020, it had a population of 24.

== Geography ==
Guerendiáin is located 18km south-southeast of Pamplona.
