= Sloppy Joe's Bar, Havana =

Coordinates: 23°08′22″N 82°21′29″W

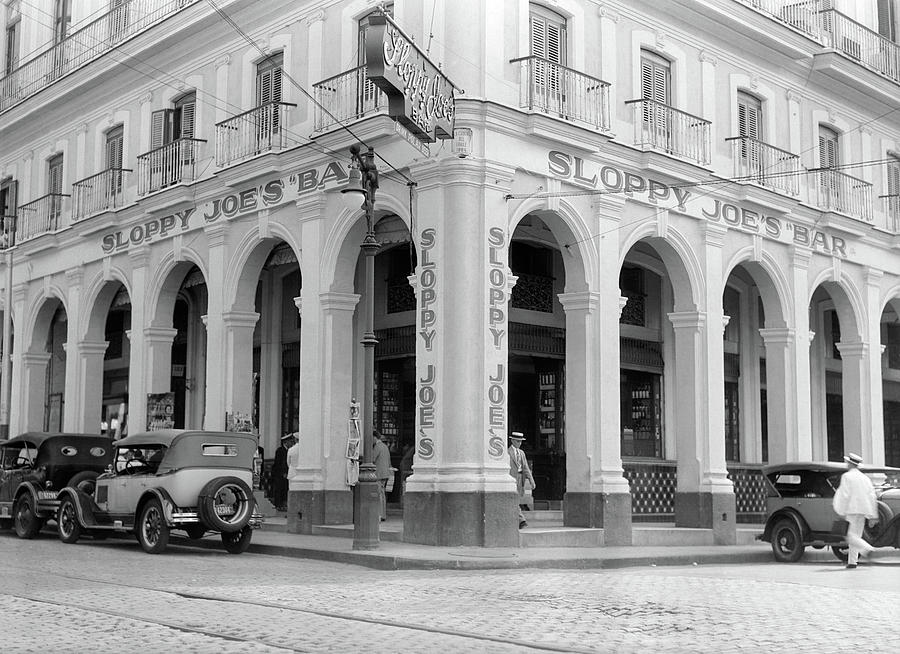
- Interactive map of the Sloppy Joe's Bar, Havana area

General information
- Type: Residential/commercial
- Architectural style: Neo classical
- Location: Zulueta and Animas Streets, Havana, Cuba

Technical details
- Structural system: Load bearing
- Material: Masonry
- Floor count: 3

Website
- http://sloppyjoes.org

Sloppy Joe's Bar is a historic bar located in Havana, Cuba. The bar reopened in 2013 after being closed for 48 years.

== History ==
Interior with clientele, c.1930s.

The building is a neo-classical 3 story masonry building located on the corner of Animas and Zulueta streets in Havana Vieja (Old Havana) on the same block as the Plaza Hotel. The bar, in its heyday, can be seen in the movie Our Man in Havana starring Alec Guinness as it is the bar in which the character (Jim Wormold) is attempted to be recruited into the secret service.

=== Prohibition ===
The advent of Prohibition in the United States spurred its original owner, Jose Abeal Otero, to change the emphasis from food service to liquor service when American tourists would visit Havana for the nightlife, the gambling and the alcohol they could not obtain back home. Sloppy Joe's welcomed tourists for over four decades, and offered over 80 cocktails in addition to the bar's own brand of 12-year-old rum. During the 1940s and 1950s it was a magnet for American celebrities as well as tourists wanting to mingle with them. It has been described by the Los Angeles Times as "one of the most famous bars in the world" with "almost the status of a shrine."

== After the revolution ==
The period after the Cuban Revolution of 1959 saw the bar's business nosedive, as some 90% of Sloppy Joe's clientele was American. A fire in 1965 closed the establishment for good. The building in which the bar was housed remained intact, resembling a ghost town with its single-piece mahogany bar and photos of celebrities. The slow-paced, extensive restoration, undertaken by The Office of the Historian of Havana, began in 2007.

Renovation work on Sloppy Joe's was completed in early 2013, and its doors opened to the public on April 12 of that year. The facade closely resembles the images from the 1950s, even down to the sign on the corner, above the arches.

== Inspiration ==
It supposedly inspired the deli sandwich sold in northern New Jersey for over half a century by the same name, sloppy joe.

== Gallery ==
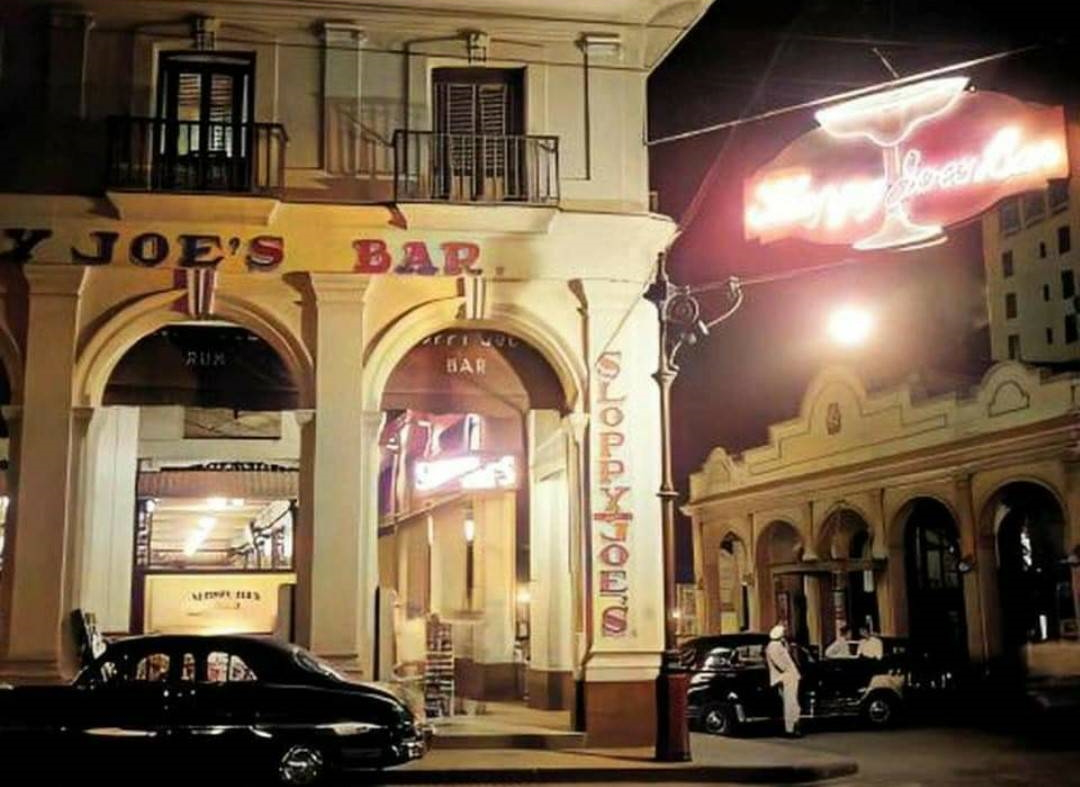
Sloppy Joe's_calles Zulueta y Animas, Havana, Cuba

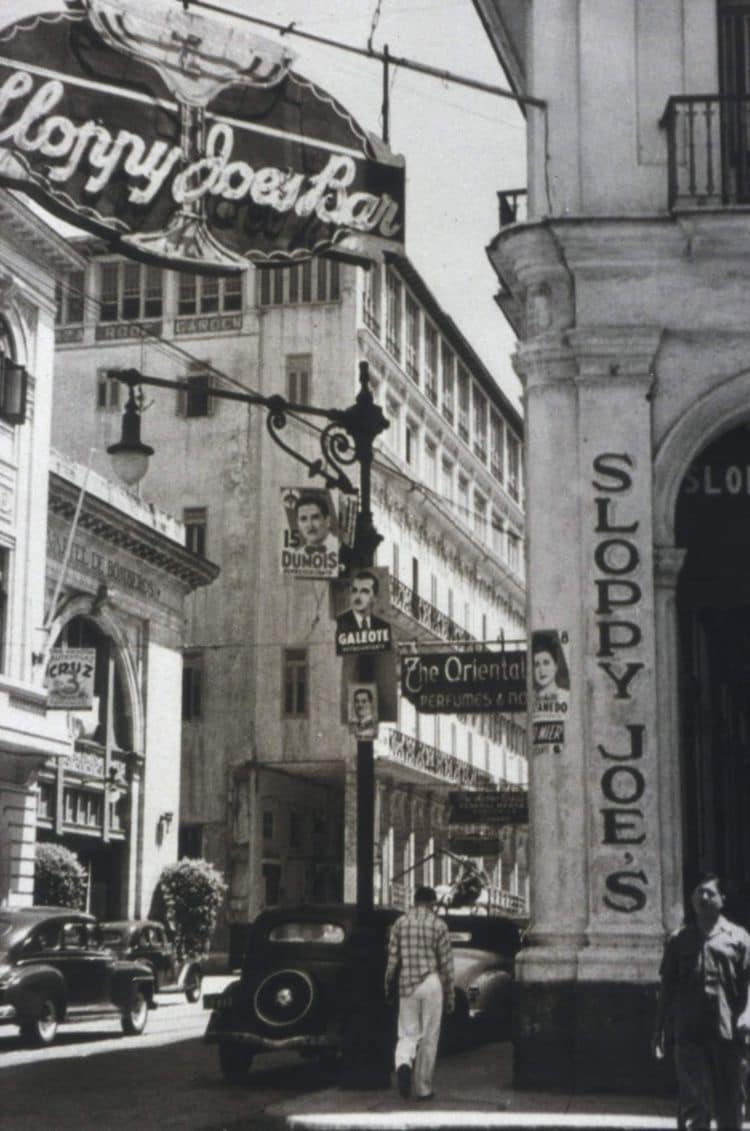
Sloppy Joes Bar

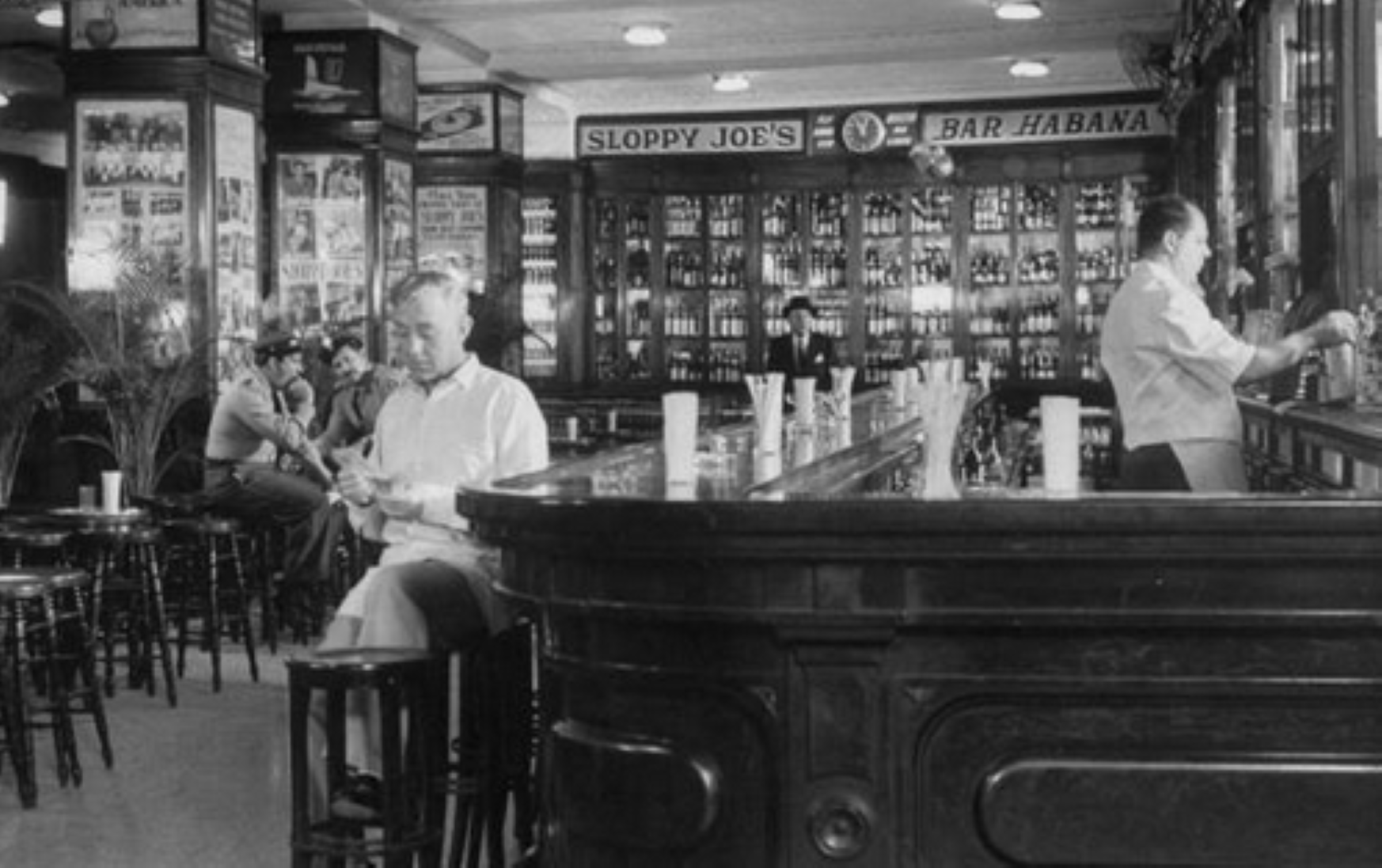
Actor Alec Guinness on set of "Our Man in Havana," filmed at Sloppy Joe's in 1958.

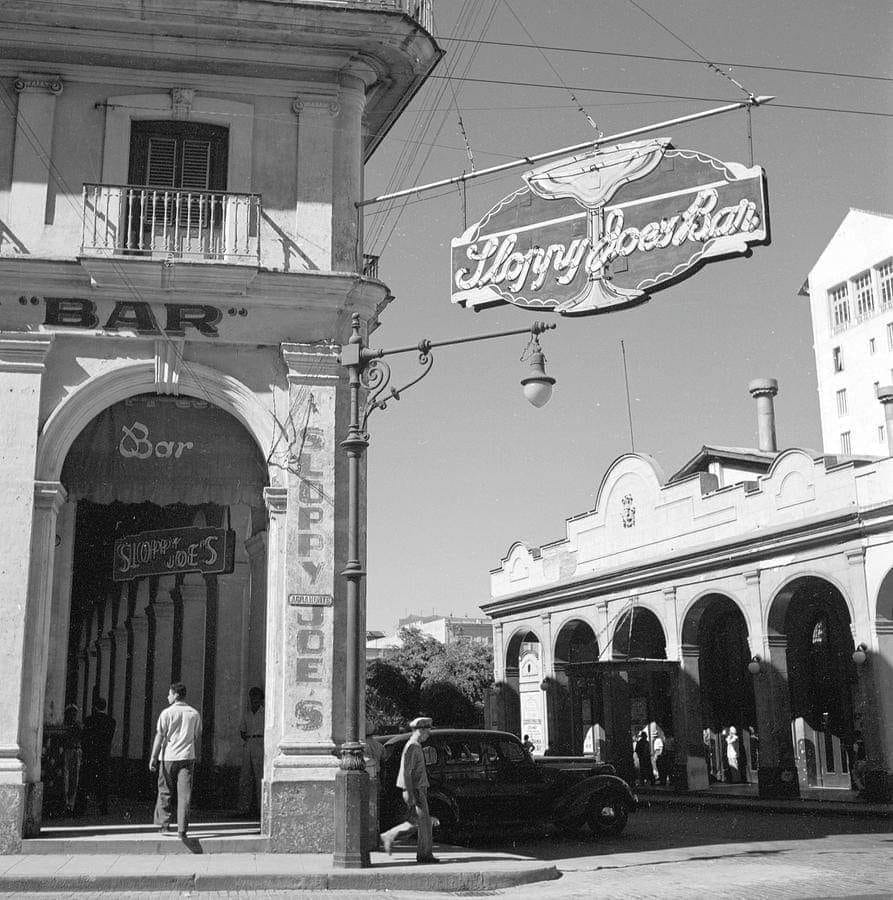
Sloppy Joe's_corner of Calles Zulueta and Animas
