= Zabalegui =

- Council
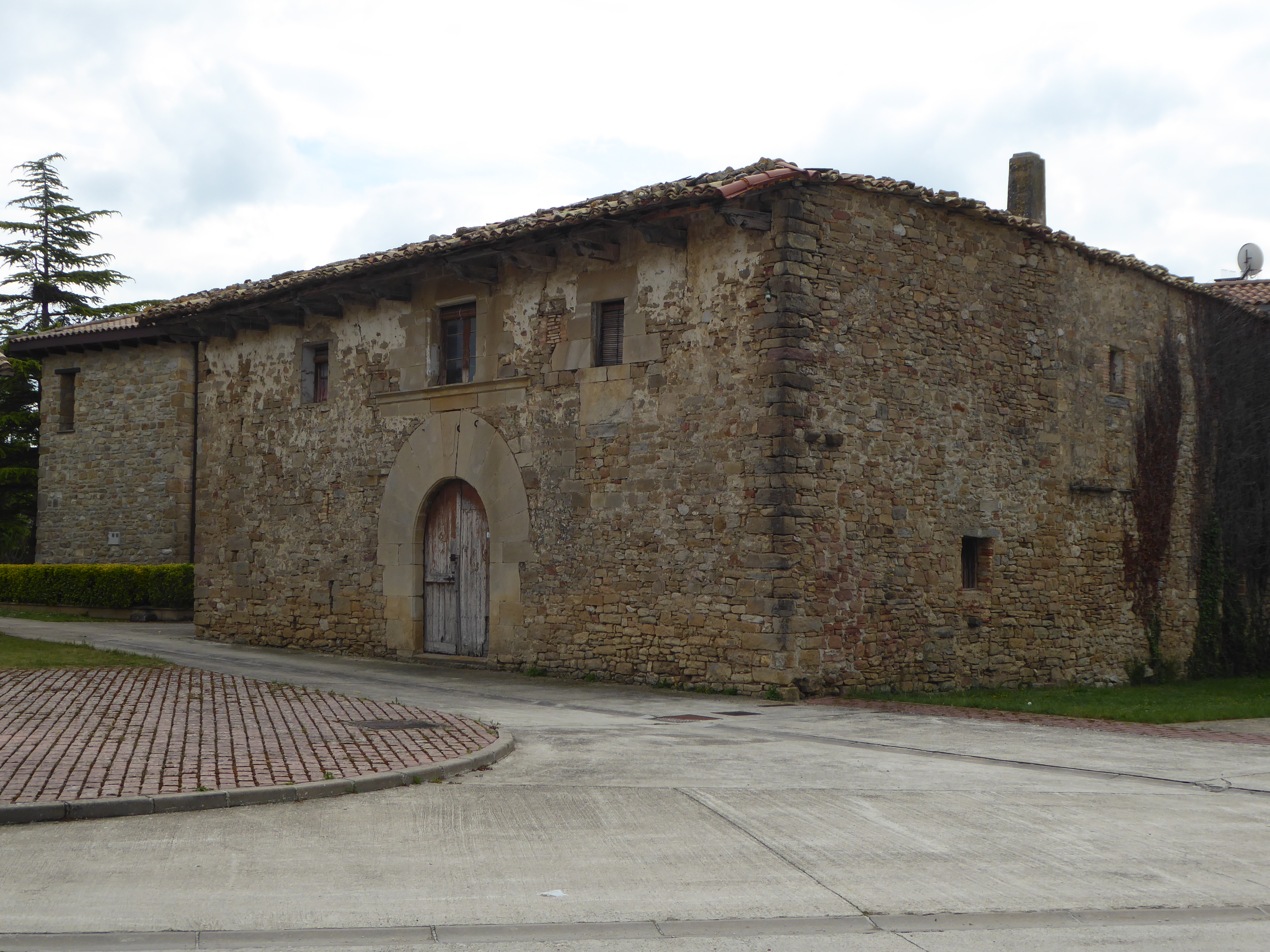

- Location within Navarre Location within Spain
- Coordinates: 42°43′49″N 1°35′2″W
- Country: Spain
- Community: Navarre
- Province: Navarre
- Municipality: Noáin
- Elevation: 495 m (1,624 ft)

Population
  - Total: 46

Zabalegui is a locality and council located in the municipality of Noáin, in Navarre province, Spain, Spain. As of 2020, it has a population of 46.

== Geography ==
Zabalegui is located 13km south-southeast of Pamplona.
