= Julián de Zulueta, 1st Marquis of Álava =

Spanish politician of Basque descent

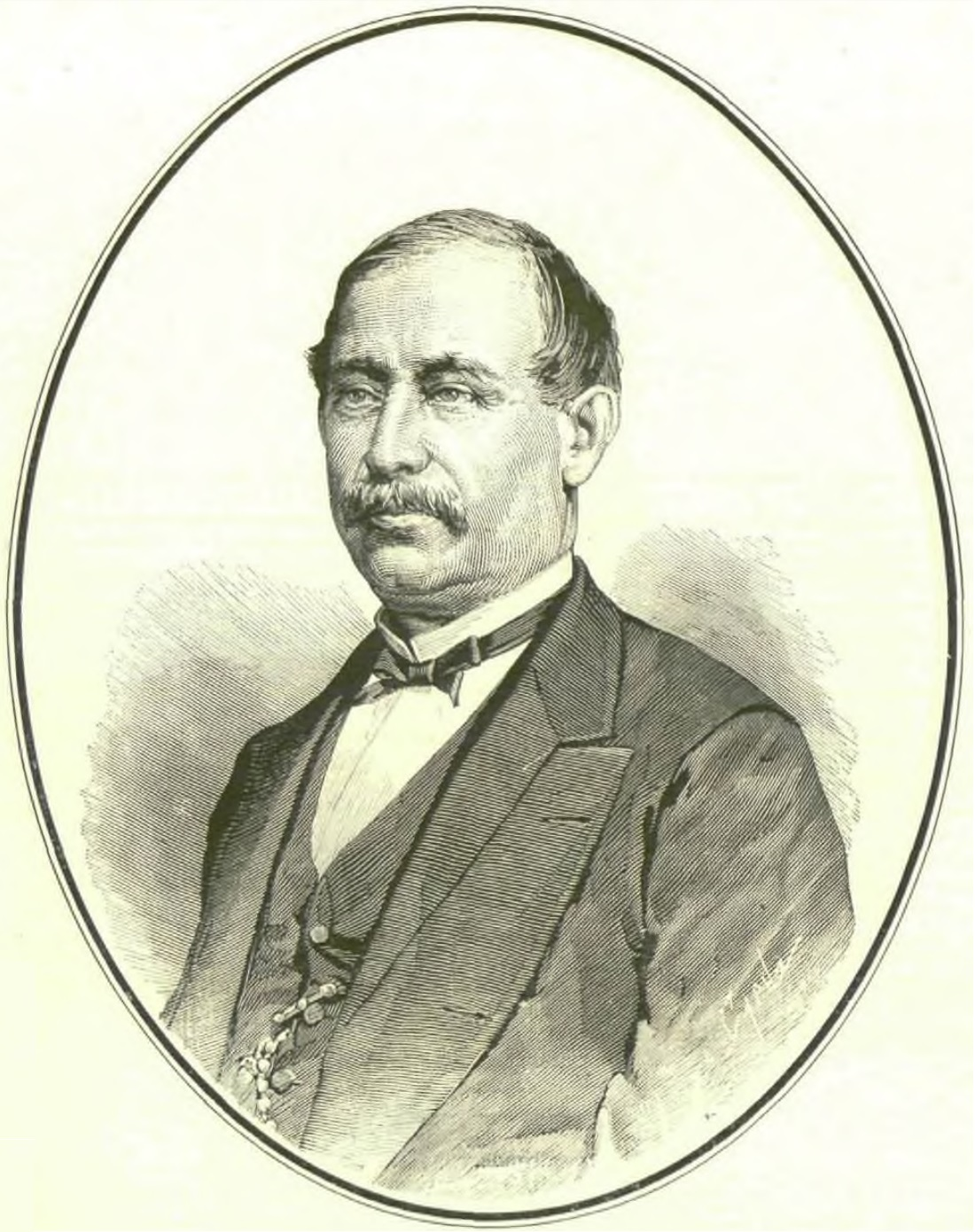
Julián de Zulueta

Julián de Zulueta y Amondo, 1st Marquis of Álava and 1st Viscount of Casablanca (Spanish: Julián de Zulueta y Amondo, primer Marqués de Álava y Vizconde de Casablanca) (8 January 1814 – 4 May 1878) was a Spanish Politician of Basque descent.

== Early life ==
Zulueta was born in Anúcita, Álava on 8 January 1814. He was the son of Domingo Timoteo de Zulueta y de Salcedo, de Lezameta y Ugarte and, his wife, Manuela Estefania de Amondo y Barañano, and a first cousin of Andrés de Isasi de Zulueta, 1st Marquis of Barambio.

== Career ==
He was a slave trader and proprietor in Cuba, Regidor and Mayor (Alcalde) of Havana, Senator for life of the Kingdom of Spain, etc., and was created Grand Cross of the Order of Isabel the Catholic and the Order of Charles III and also received the titles of 1st Marquess of Álava and the previous title of 1st Viscount of Casa Blanca. Among his many commercial and industrial activities was a very extensive part in the trans-Atlantic slave trade.

== Personal life ==
On 1 October 1842, Zulueta married Francisca de los Dolores Samá y de la Mota (1825–1857). Francisca, who was born in Trujillo, Badajoz, was a daughter of Lt. Jaime Samá y Martí of the Infantry of the Spanish Army, who was of Catalan descent, and, his wife, Josefa de la Mota y García, of Castilian descent. Before her death in 1857 in Havana, they were the parents of:

- Salvador de Zulueta y Samá, 2nd Marquess of Álava, 2nd Viscount of Casa Blanca (1851–1913), who married María de las Angustias Martos y Arizcún, daughter of the 6th Marquesses of Iturbieta.
- Ernesto de Zulueta y Samá (1855–1919), a Spanish Politician who married his second cousin María de Isasi y Murgoitio, a daughter of Andrés de Isasi, 1st Marquis of Barambio, in 1881.

The Marquis of Álava died in Havana in 1878.
