= Noáin (Valle de Elorz) – Noain (Elortzibar) =

Noáin / Noain
- Municipality
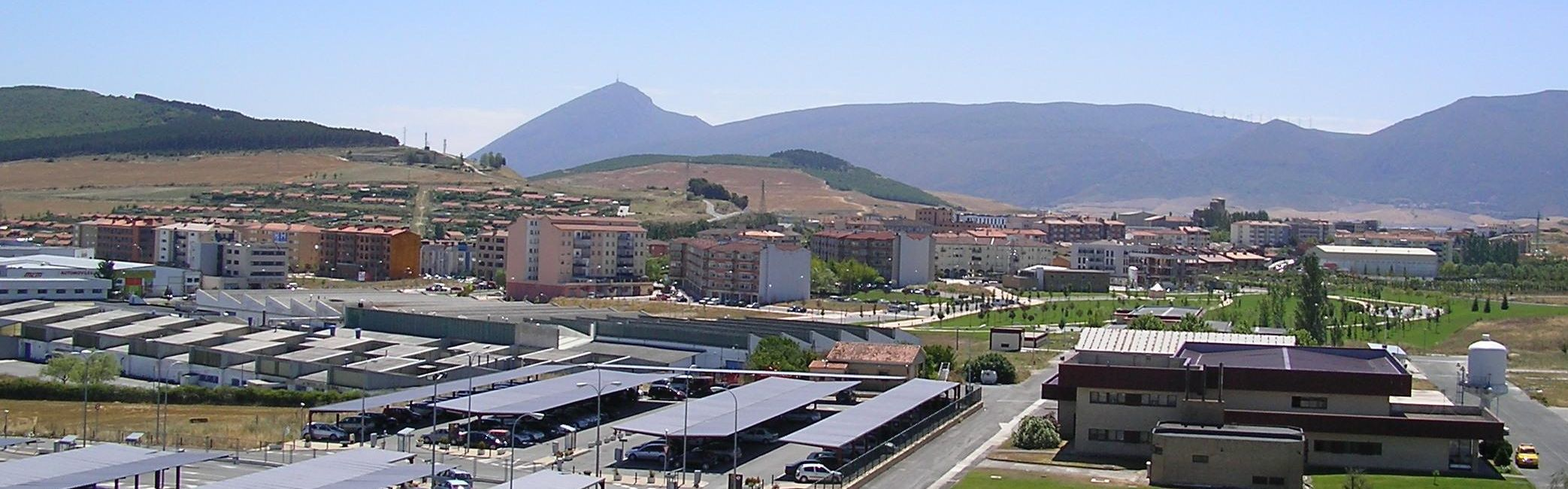

- Flag Coat of arms

- Location in Navarre
- Coordinates: 42°45′17″N 1°38′00″W
- Country: Spain
- Community: Navarre
- Province: Navarre
- Comarca / Eskualdea: Cuenca de Pamplona

Government
  - Mayor: Óscar Arizcuren Pola (UPN)

Area
  - Total: 48.24 km^{2} (18.63 sq mi)
  - Land: 48.24 km^{2} (18.63 sq mi)
  - Water: 0.00 km^{2} (0 sq mi)
- Elevation: 450 m (1,480 ft)

Population (2025-01-01)
  - Total: 8,486
  - Density: 175.9/km^{2} (455.6/sq mi)
- Demonym: Noaindarra
- Time zone: UTC+1 (CET)
  - Summer (DST): UTC+2 (CEST)
- Postal code: 31110
- Area code: (+34) 948
- Website: Official website

Noáin (Spanish: Noáin (Valle de Elorz), Basque: Noain (Elortzibar)) is a municipality in Navarre, Spain. The main settlement is Noáin, a suburb in the southern part of the Pamplona metropolitan area and with many industrial parks. The municipality comprises also several rural villages. Pamplona Airport is located in Noáin.

== Geography ==
Noáin (6,621 inhabitants in the village) counts 10 hamlets (núcleos de población):

Village	Population (2014)
Elorz	273
Ezperun	0
Guerendiáin	26
Imárcoain	361
Oriz	8
Otano	16
Torres de Elorz	254
Yárnoz	17
Zabalegui	34
Zulueta	227

== Gallery ==
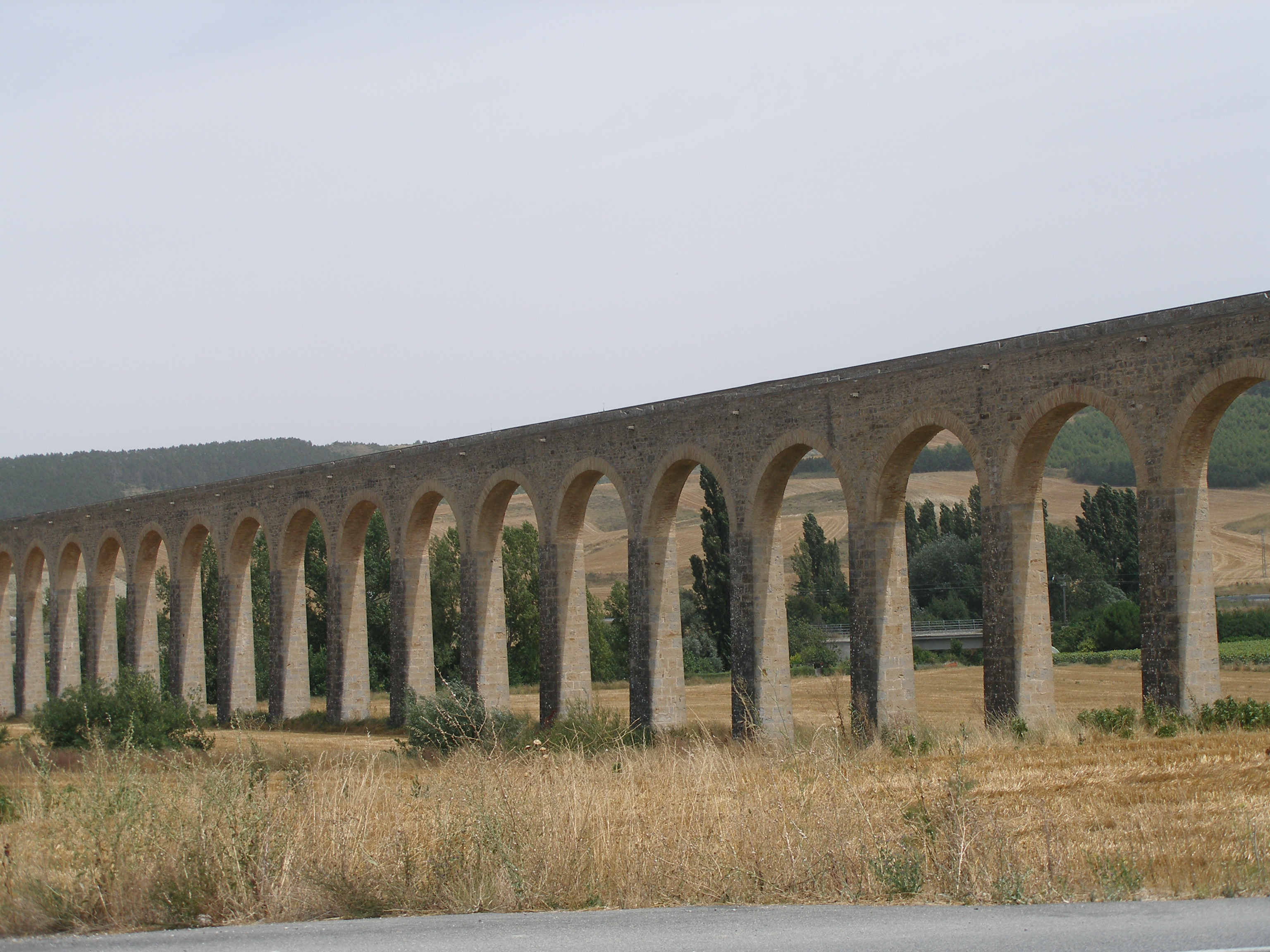
Aqueduct

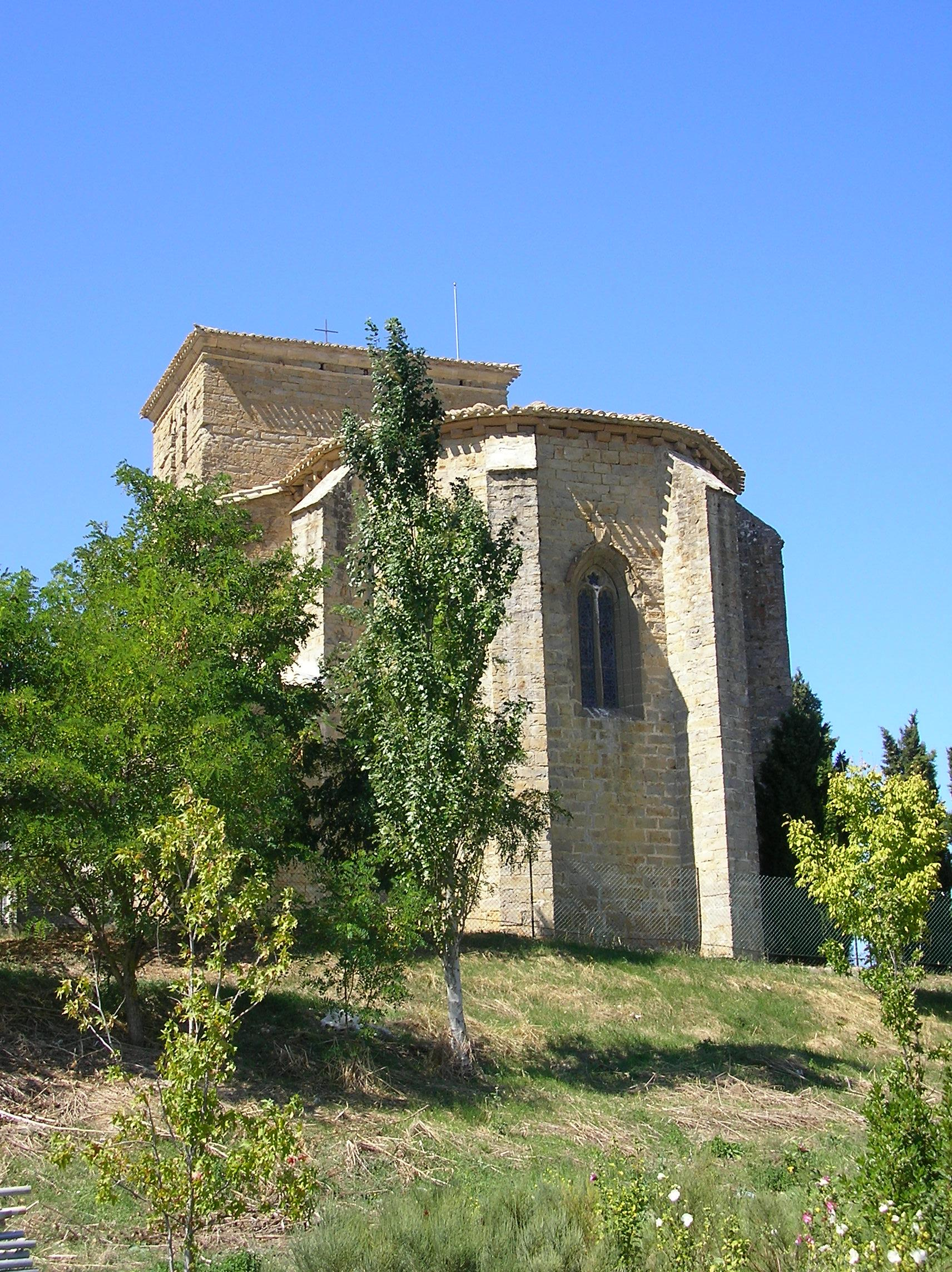
Church of San Miguel

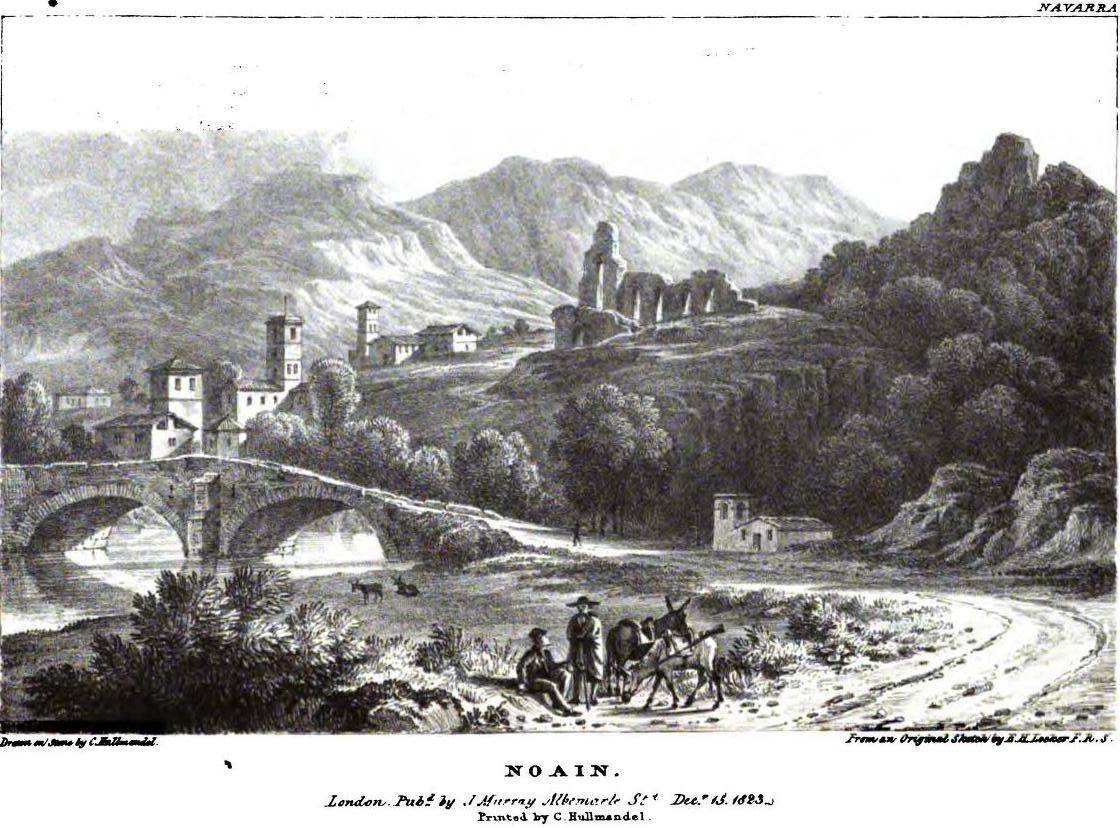
Noain by Edward Hawke Locker in 1823, published in the work Views in Spain
