= Zulueta, Navarre =

Zulueta
- Locality
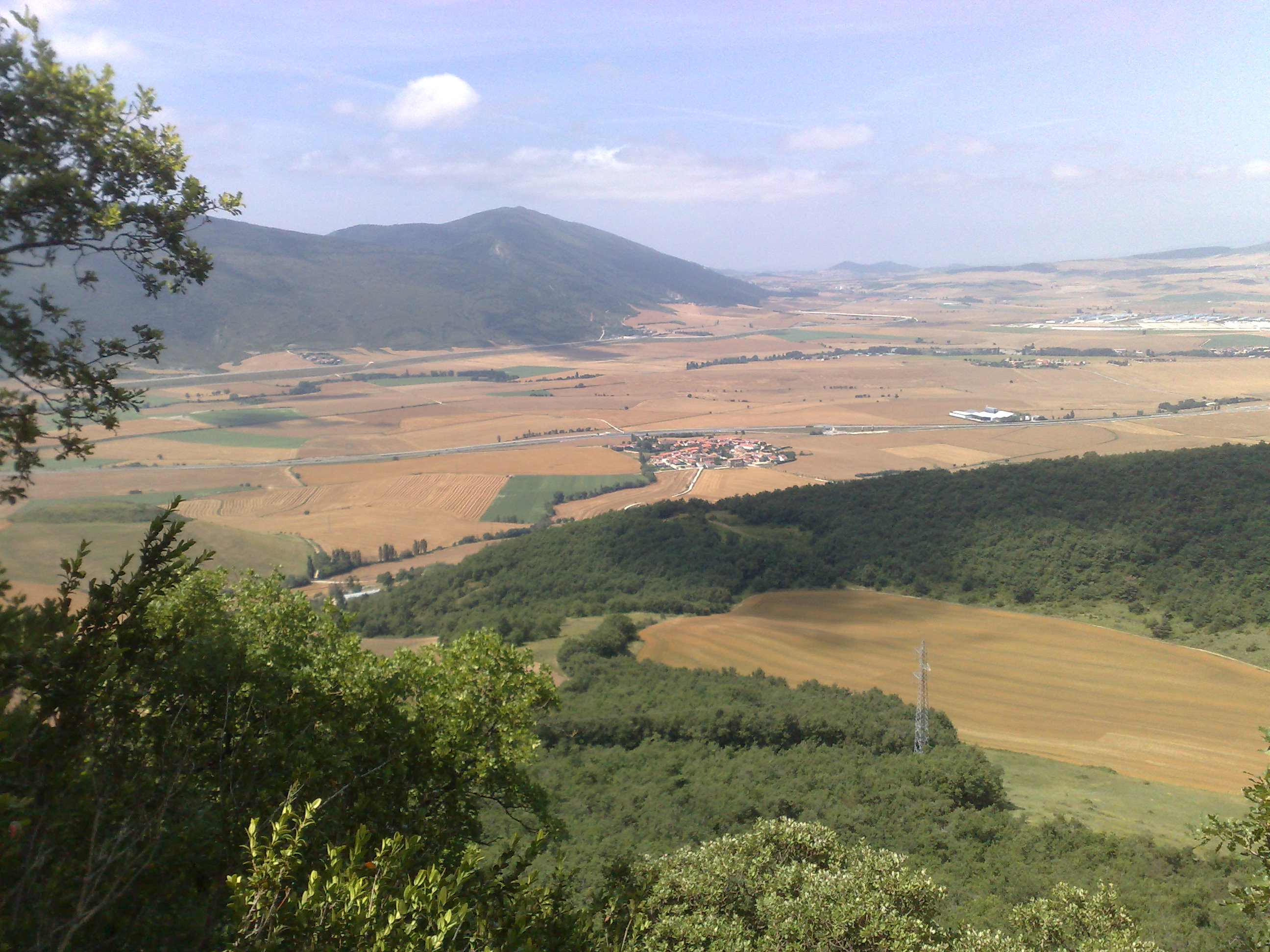

- Location within Navarre Location within Spain
- Coordinates: 42°44′40″N 1°34′46″W
- Country: Spain
- Community: Navarre
- Province: Navarre
- Municipality: Noáin
- Elevation: 478 m (1,568 ft)

Population
  - Total: 291

Zulueta is a locality located in the municipality of Noáin, in Navarre province, Spain, Spain. As of 2020, it has a population of 291.

== Geography ==
Zulueta is located 13km southeast of Pamplona.
