= Elorz =

- Council
- Elorz/Elortz
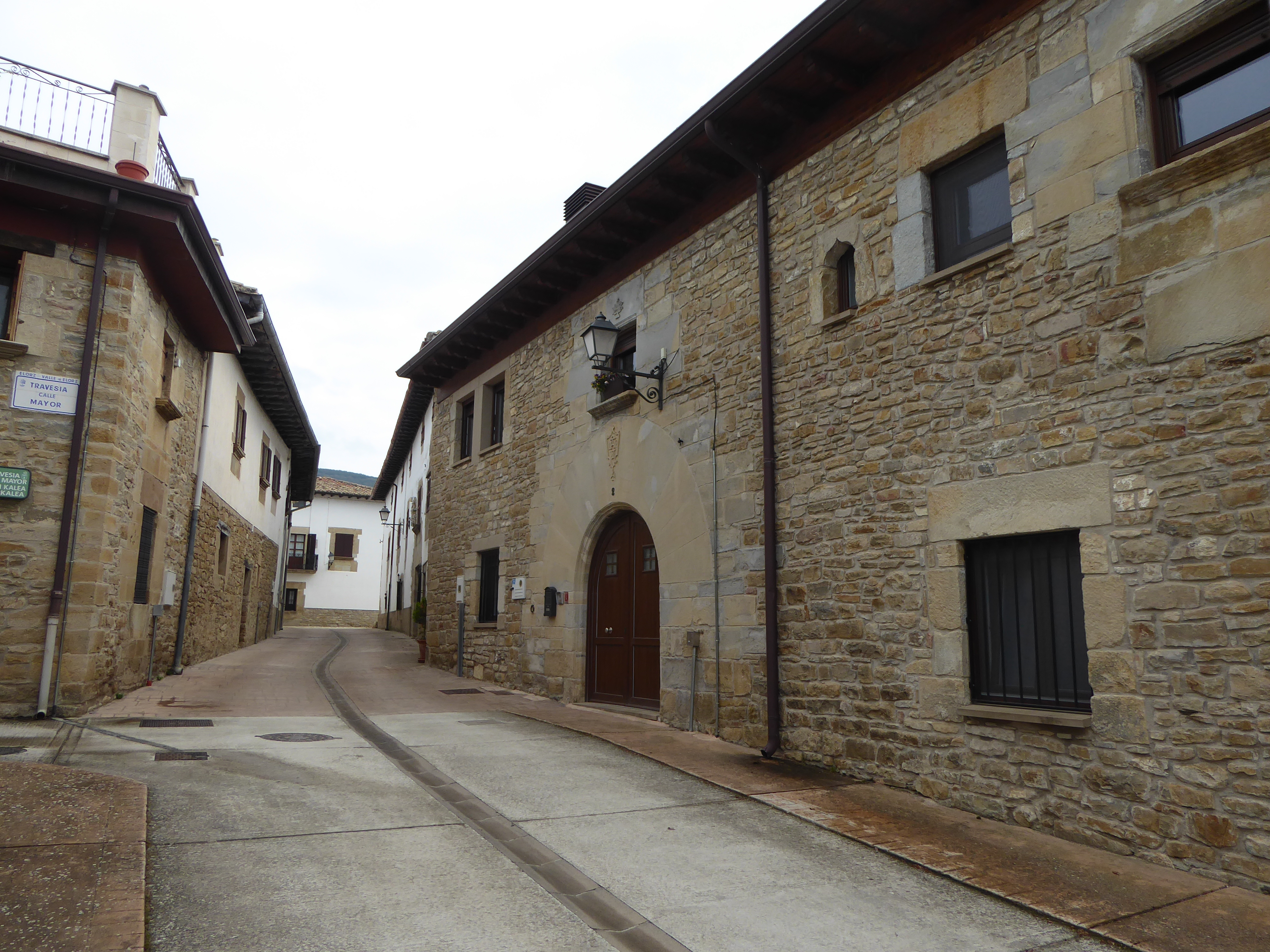

- Location within Navarre Location within Spain
- Coordinates: 42°43′59″N 1°33′34″W
- Country: Spain
- Community: Navarre
- Province: Navarre
- Municipality: Noáin
- Elevation: 488 m (1,601 ft)

Population
  - Total: 293

Elorz or Elortz is a locality and council located in the municipality of Noáin, in Navarre province, Spain, Spain. As of 2020, it has a population of 293.

== Geography ==
Elorz is located 14km southeast of Pamplona.
