= Zulueta (Remedios) =

- Village
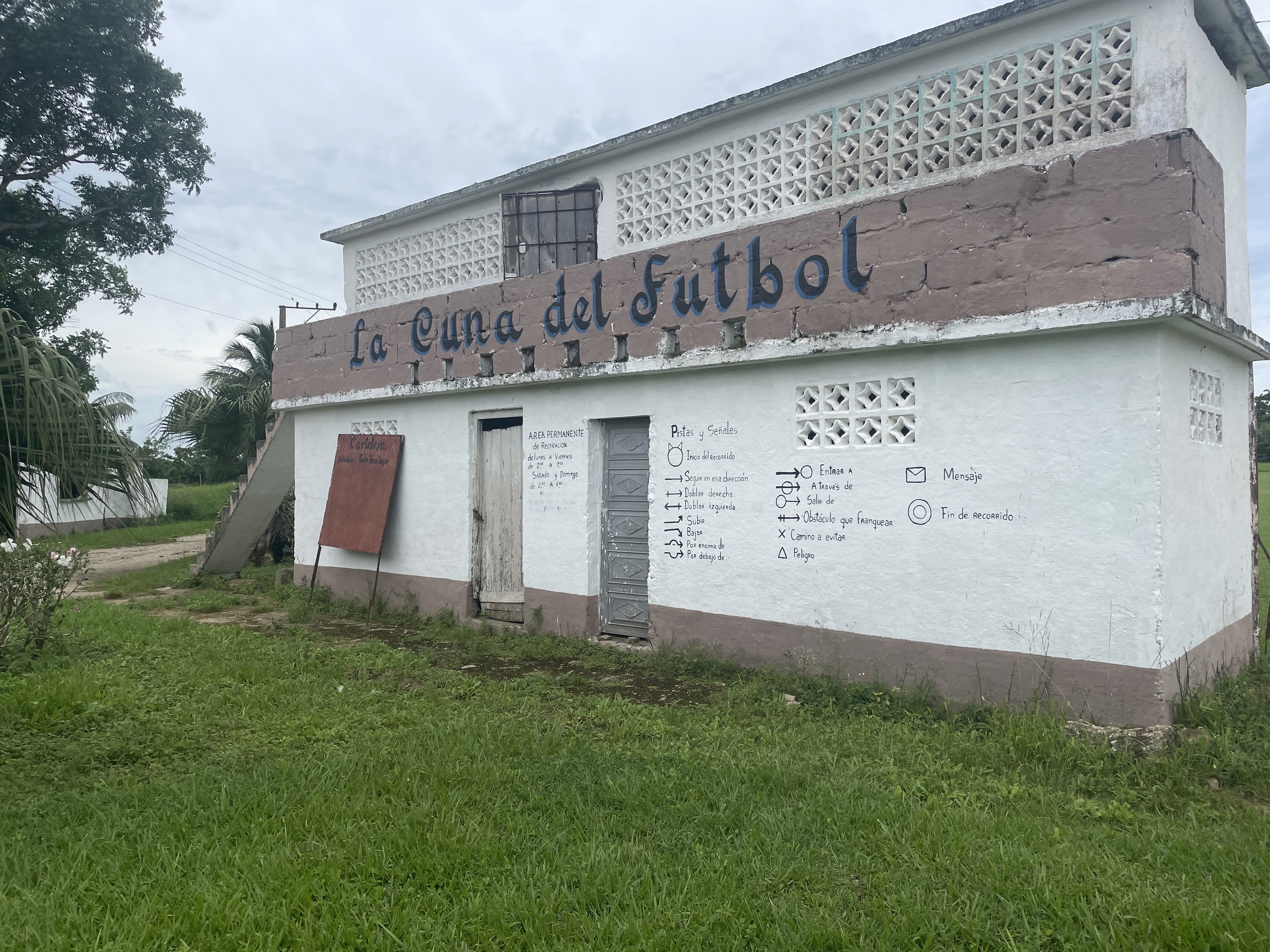
- Building at the Camilo Cienfuegos Stadium

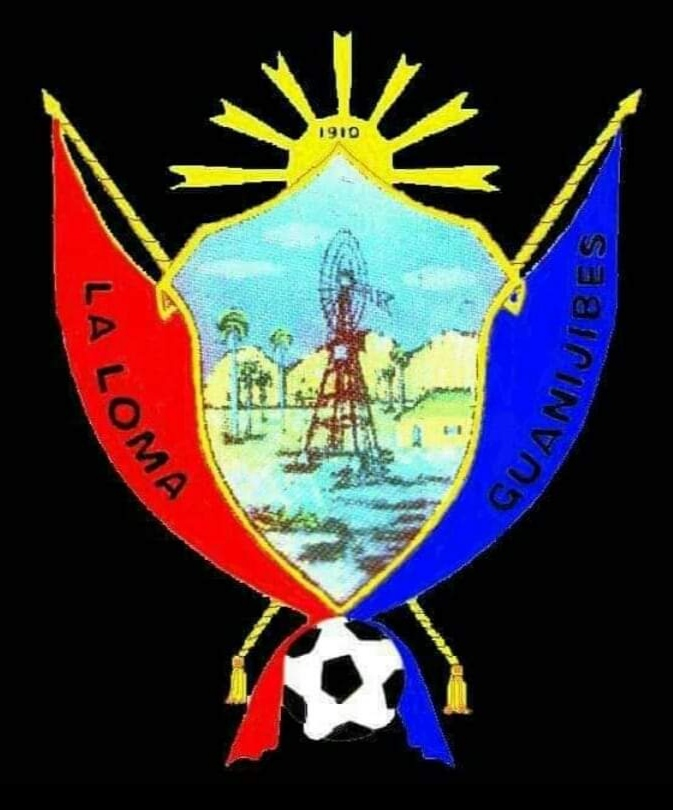
- Coat of arms
- Nickname: La Cuna del Fútbol
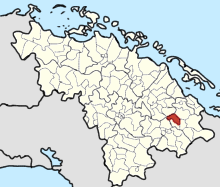
- Map of Zulueta Popular Council (Red) in Remedios (Orange) in Villa Clara (Yellow)

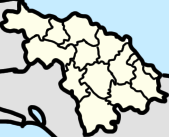
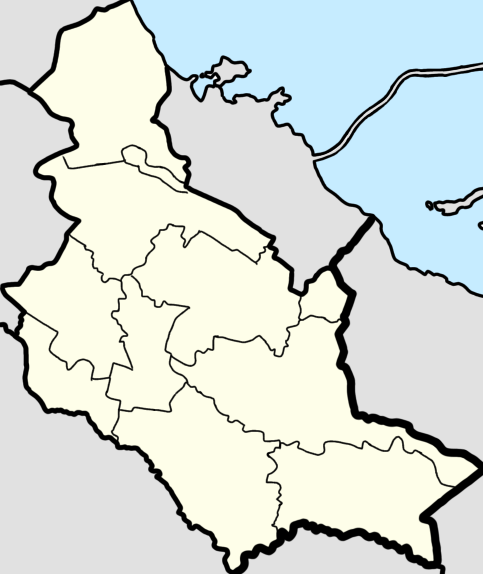
- Location of Zulueta in Cuba Zulueta (Villa Clara Province) Zulueta (Remedios)
- Coordinates: 22°22′4.51″N 79°34′8.47″W
- Country: Cuba
- Province: Villa Clara
- Municipality: Remedios
- Founded: 1869

Area
  - Total: 4.579 km^{2} (1.768 sq mi)
- Elevation: 180 m (590 ft)

Population (2012)
  - Total: 5,709
- Time zone: UTC-5 (EST)
- Area code: +53-4239

Zulueta is a Cuban village and consejo popular ("popular council", i.e. hamlet) of the municipality of Remedios, in Villa Clara Province. It is considered the Cuban birthplace of football and, with a population of ca. 10,000 is the most populated village in the municipality after Remedios.

== History ==
The village was founded in 1869 and in 1876 was connected to the railway network. Until the administrative reform of 1977, it was an autonomous municipality of 117 km², that included the villages of Floridanos and Guadalupe, which are both currently part of Camajuaní.

In the 1907 census Zulueta, which was a barrio at the time was switched from being a part of the municipality of Camajuaní to Remedios.

== Geography ==
Zulueta is located on a valley between Remedios (15 km north) and Placetas (13 km south), and is crossed in the middle by a road named "Carretera a Zulueta". It is 22 km far from Camajuaní, 23 from Caibarién, the nearest seaside town, 42 from Cabaiguán, 48 from Santa Clara, and 61 from Sancti Spíritus.

The railway station is located 3.8 km south, in a small settlement named Tahón (22.3415°N 79.5787°W). It is part of the Santa Clara-Camajuaní-Morón-Nuevitas line, and has a minor branch to Placetas; part of the old line (1876) Caibarién-Placetas via Camajuaní.

== Sports ==
Zulueta is considered the Cuban birthplace of football because it was one of the first villages in which this sport was brought by Spanish traders, in early 20th century. A testimony of this relationship is, for example, the Monumento al Balón, a stone sculpture of a football ball (balón) located in town's centre, with the inscription Zulueta - Cuna del Fútbol (Zulueta - Birthplace of Football). Another example is the presence of a football ball in the coat of arms.

The football club Villa Clara, playing in Santa Clara at the Sandino Stadium, and representing the city and the whole province; is de jure based in Zulueta and plays some matches at the Camilo Cienfuegos Stadium. It also exists a documentary, named Gol de Cuba, that speaks about Zulueta and its passion for the association football.

== Notable people ==
- Pedro Faife, footballer of Villa Clara and Miami FC
- Rolando Reyes Sr., cigar maker of Honduras

== See also ==
- Parrandas
- Municipalities of Cuba
- List of cities in Cuba
