= Plaza Hotel (Havana) =

Hotel in Havana, Cuba

Hotel Plaza
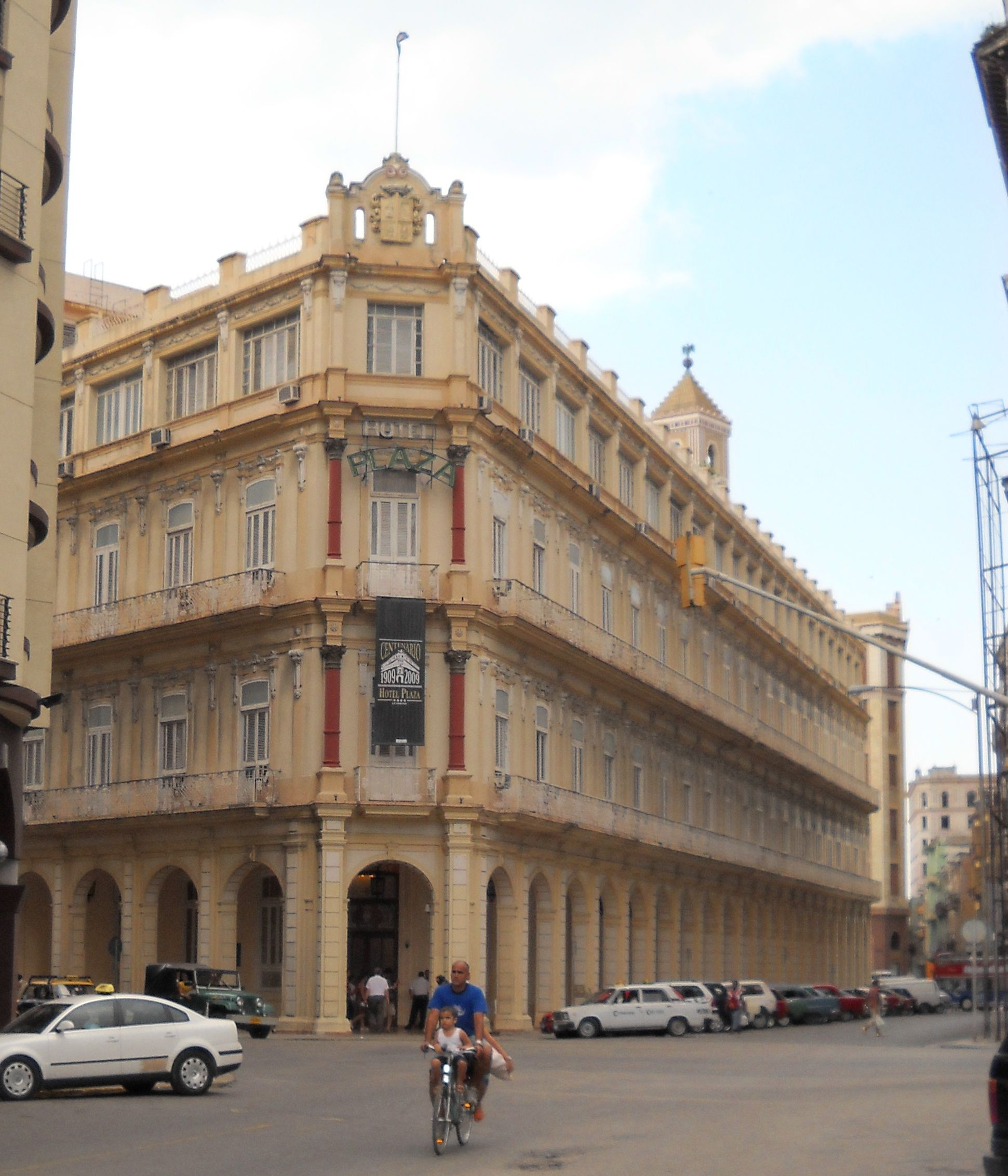

General information
- Location: Ignacio Agramonte No. 267; Havana, Cuba
- Coordinates: 23.13873129°N 82.35802193°W
- Opening: 1909
- Owner: Gran Caribe

Technical details
- Floor count: 4

Design and construction
- Architect: Ricardo Galbis Abella
- Developer: Purdy and Henderson, Engineers

The Hotel Plaza is a historic four-story hotel in the Old Havana section of Havana.

== History ==
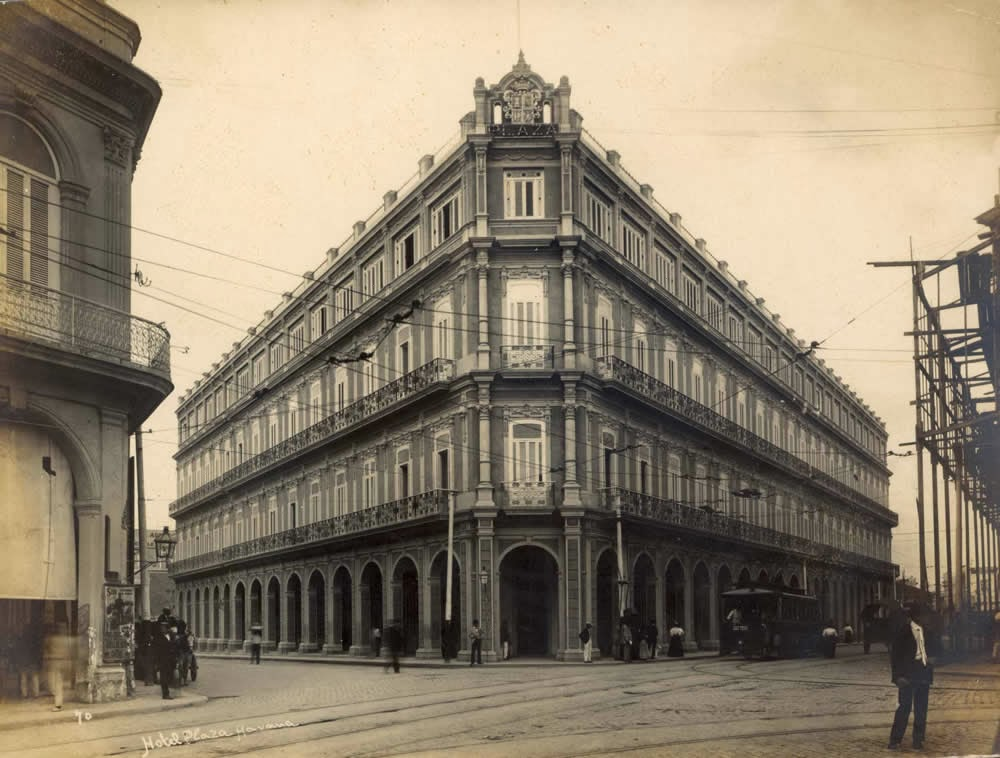
The Hotel Plaza in the early 20th Century

The Hotel Plaza was founded by Captain Walter Fletcher Smith, and was built from an existing colonial building. It was designed by Ricardo Galbis Abella, and constructed by the New York firm of Purdy and Henderson, Engineers. The hotel opened in 1909. The hotel was renovated in 1919 with a roof garden that included a ballroom and restaurant. Guests at the hotel included Albert Einstein, Babe Ruth, Isadora Duncan, and Anna Pavlova.

A casino was opened in the hotel during the 1950s. It was owned by Philadelphia crime family member Angelo Bruno, along with Joseph "Hoboken Joe" Stassi and his son Joe Stassi Jr. Stassi was an associate of mobster Meyer Lansky. French Canadian Lucien Rivard also purchased casino interests. R. D. Matthews of Texas owned the hotel bar. The casino was destroyed by mobs in early January 1959 as Fidel Castro's rebel army overtook Havana. Slot machines were pulled out of the casino and thrown on a bonfire.

During the late 1980s, the hotel was restored. It reopened in 1991 as part of the Gran Caribe hotel group.

In 2023, it was announced that the hotel would join the luxury Meliá Collection division of the Spanish Meliá Hotels International chain, but before this happened, the company ceased all operations in Cuba in 2026.
