= Baranbio =

Village in Álava, Spain

- Concejo
- Location within Álava Location within the Basque Country Location within Spain
- Coordinates: 43°02′55″N 2°55′15″W
- Country: Spain
- Autonomous community: Basque Country
- Province: Álava
- Comarca: Ayala
- Municipality: Amurrio

Area
  - Total: 10.82 km^{2} (4.18 sq mi)
- Elevation: 269 m (883 ft)

Population (2023)
  - Total: 136
  - Density: 12.6/km^{2} (32.6/sq mi)
- Postal code: 01450

Baranbio (Spanish: Barambio) is a village and concejo in the municipality of Amurrio, Álava, Basque Country, Spain.
