= Anúcita =

Coordinates: 42°48′N 2°54′W

Anúcita/Anuntzeta is a village that belongs to the municipality of Ribera Alta and the Cuadrilla (that is, a territorial division of Álava) of Añana, in the judicial district of Vitoria-Gasteiz, Álava-Araba, in the Basque country of Spain. It lies at the foot of the mountain San Vitores (891 m) and on the left bank of the Bayas River at an elevation of 580 m. The village is bordered to the north by Subijana and Morillas, to the east by Nubilla, to the south by Hereña, and to the west by Pobes.

Spanish is the local language; Basque ceased to be used between the 16th and 17th centuries.

== Education ==
It has no public school so the children have to go to the town of Nanclares de la Oca.

== History ==
It is located on the southern slopes of the Western appendix of Sierra of Tuyo. It is visible from many points from the bank of the river Bayas.

Ánucita is divided in three neighbourhoods: Ánucita, San Miguel and Mimbredo, the latter two in the lower area and adjacent to the left bank of the river Bayas.

In Ánucita, the church of San Esteban is located in a privileged location, in the higher part of the village with splendid panoramic views of the work lands bathed by the river Bayas.

The temple is of a vamet with polygonal head, square tower topped by a bell tower body and a porth with two arches of half point. By deed of obligation it is known that the altarpiece of the high altar was built in the year 1793 by Juan Antonio Moraza. In the outer wall of the tower on the bottom window there is a circular Chrismon which is an anagram formed by the first two letters of the name of Christ in Greek. The Chrismon is a symbol of Christ and also an emblem of victory, both military and spiritual, triumph of the faith and triumph over death.

A notable building is the palace of Ánucita, having belonged to the Zulueta family. This family presided the cultural association “Sancho el Sabio”. It is rectangular, with three floors and with a compact appearance, made of masonry and stonework, with important works in wood, such as the front door and the balconies. Iron looks at the main balcony above the door.

In the neighborhood of San Miguel, there are two modules for collection cereals, their function is identified by the “silo”. Today these buildings belong to a cooperative of cereal. In Mimbredo there is a small mill, which is now abandoned. In this neighbourhood there is a bridge over the river Bayas with three arches. On the other side of the bridge there is an archaic and well-preserved spring that is known as Fuente Pinto.

It celebrates its patron day on 12 October.
