= Algorta =

Locality in the municipality of Getxo, Spain

Coordinates: 43°21′N 3°01′W

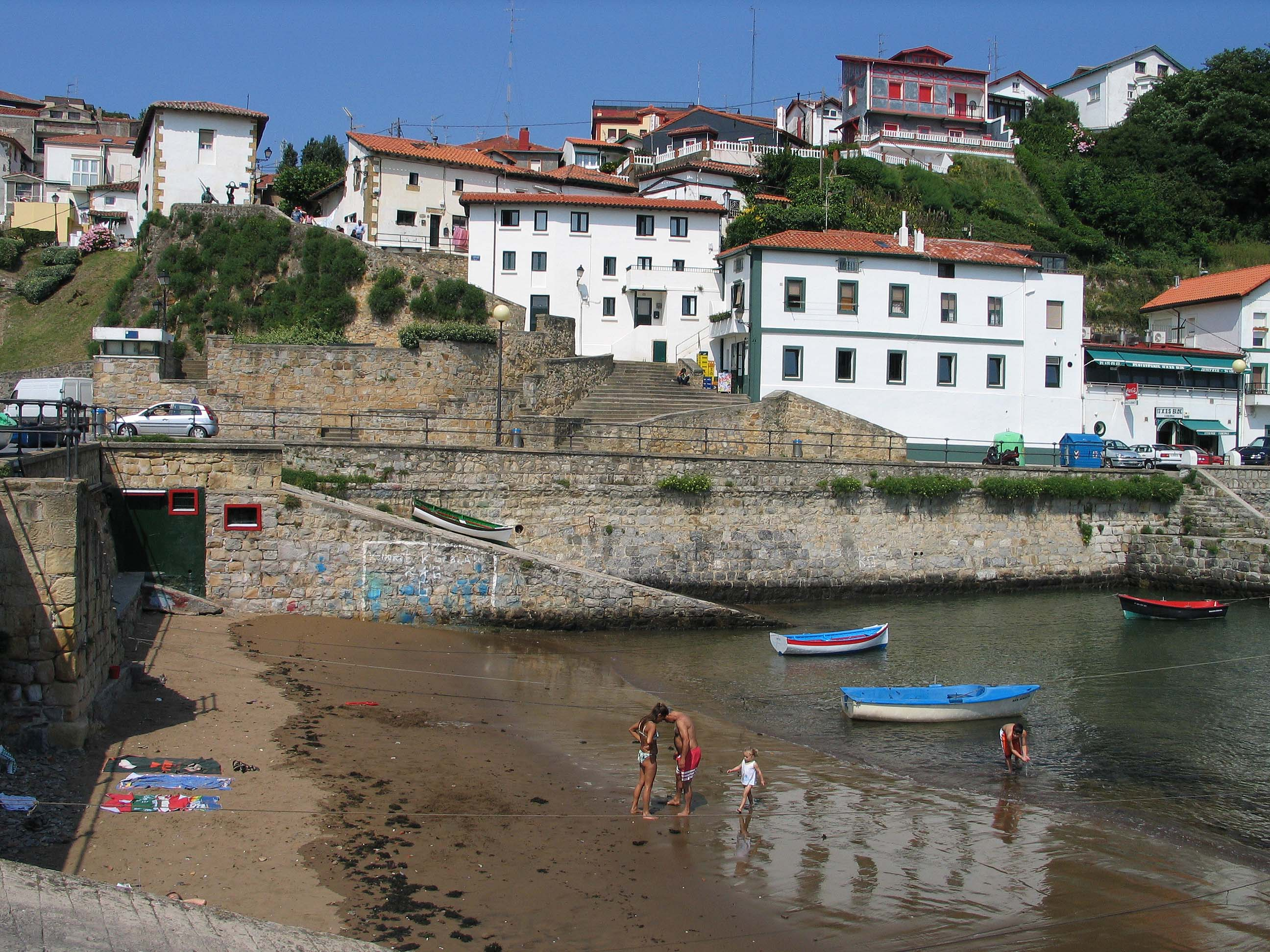
Puerto Viejo in Algorta

Algorta is a locality within the municipality of Getxo, in the province of Biscay, Basque Country, Spain. In 1996, the population of Algorta was 35,600.

The Metro Plaza situated in Telletxe street is considered to be the center of town and commerce. The two most historically important plazas in town are St. Nicholas Plaza and St. Ignacius Plaza.

== Neighborhoods ==
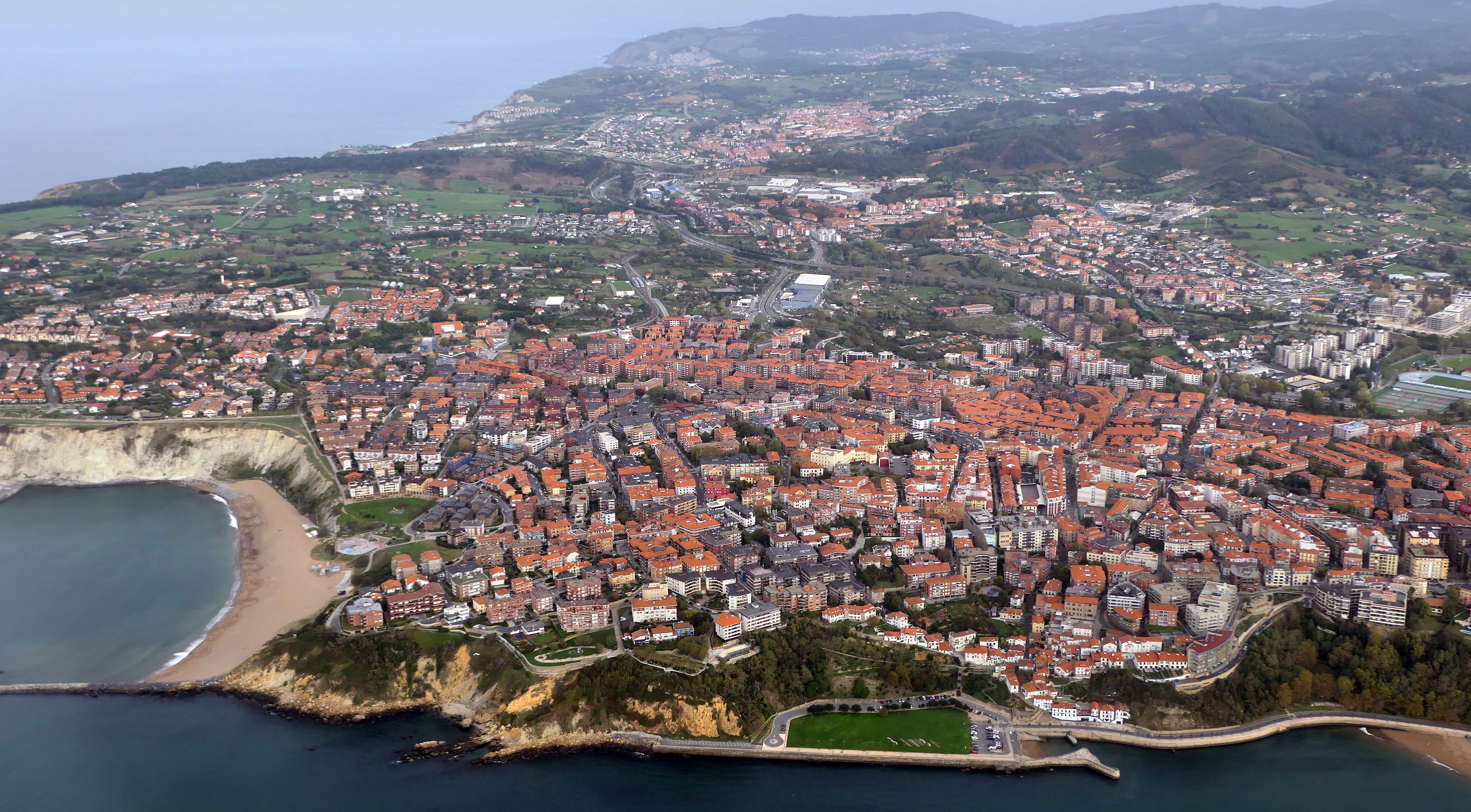
Aerial view

Sarrikobaso- This neighborhood has the highest population density in Algorta and takes its name from one of the streets where it is predominantly located. It has a metro station called Bidezabal as well as a health center.

La Humedad- The farthest neighborhood from the coast of Getxo, La Humedad is a quiet area. In it, one can find the Fadura Municipal Sport City. 'Fadura' comes from the basque voice 'padura' which means swamp. That swamp is located behind the Fadura Sport city and a few years ago it started being cared by cleaning programs.

Villamonte- It is a residential and quiet neighborhood and has a lot of parks and trees. Its name comes from the Spanish words villa=village and monte=mountain.
