= 2007 CONCACAF Gold Cup squads =

National team squads list

CONCACAF (Confederation of North, Central American and Caribbean Association Football) announced on 30 May 2007 the final squads for all twelve teams that would compete in the 2007 CONCACAF Gold Cup. The squad for each team consisted of 23 players, as stipulated in the CONCACAF Gold Cup Tournament Rules and Regulations. A listed player could only be substituted in the event of a serious injury up until 24 hours before the team's first match at the tournament.

== Group A ==
=== Canada ===
Head coach: (Trinidad and Tobago) Stephen Hart

No.	Pos.	Player	Date of birth (age)	Caps	Goals	Club
1	GK	Greg Sutton	19 April 1977 (aged 30)	7	0	(Canadian Soccer Association) Toronto
2	DF	Adam Braz	7 June 1981 (aged 25)	9	0	(Canadian Soccer Association) Toronto
3	DF	Ante Jazić	26 February 1976 (aged 31)	23	0	(United States Soccer Federation) LA Galaxy
4	DF	Marco Reda	22 June 1977 (aged 29)	6	0	(Canadian Soccer Association) Toronto
5	DF	André Hainault	17 June 1986 (aged 20)	7	0	(Football Association of the Czech Republic) SIAD Most
6	MF	Julian de Guzman	25 March 1981 (aged 26)	24	2	(Royal Spanish Football Federation) Deportivo de La Coruña
7	DF	Paul Stalteri (c)	18 October 1977 (aged 29)	36	0	(The Football Association) Tottenham Hotspur
8	MF	Kevin Harmse	4 July 1984 (aged 22)	5	0	(United States Soccer Federation) LA Galaxy
9	FW	Rob Friend	23 January 1981 (aged 26)	13	1	(Royal Dutch Football Association) Heracles Almelo
10	FW	Ali Gerba	27 June 1982 (aged 24)	13	4	(Danish Football Association) Horsens
11	DF	Richard Hastings	16 May 1977 (aged 30)	26	0	(Scottish Football Association) Caledonian Thistle
12	DF	Gabriel Gervais	18 September 1976 (aged 30)	0	0	(Canadian Soccer Association) Montreal Impact
13	MF	Atiba Hutchinson	8 February 1983 (aged 24)	27	3	(Danish Football Association) Copenhagen
14	FW	Dwayne De Rosario	15 May 1978 (aged 29)	37	10	(United States Soccer Federation) Houston Dynamo
15	MF	Patrice Bernier	23 September 1979 (aged 27)	23	0	(German Football Association) 1. FC Kaiserslautern
16	MF	Martin Nash	27 December 1975 (aged 31)	18	0	(Canadian Soccer Association) Vancouver Whitecaps
17	FW	Iain Hume	31 October 1983 (aged 23)	16	2	(The Football Association) Leicester City
18	MF	Issey Nakajima	16 May 1984 (aged 23)	6	0	(Danish Football Association) Vejle Boldklub
19	MF	Antonio Ribeiro	8 October 1980 (aged 26)	1	0	(Canadian Soccer Association) Montreal Impact
20	DF	Chris Pozniak	10 January 1981 (aged 26)	18	0	(Canadian Soccer Association) Toronto
21	MF	Nikolas Ledgerwood	16 January 1985 (aged 22)	1	0	(German Football Association) Wacker Burghausen
22	GK	Pat Onstad	13 January 1968 (aged 39)	17	0	(United States Soccer Federation) Houston Dynamo
23	GK	Roberto Giacomi	1 August 1986 (aged 20)	0	0	(Royal Belgian Football Association) Beveren

=== Costa Rica ===
Head coach: (Costa Rica) Hernán Medford

No.	Pos.	Player	Date of birth (age)	Caps	Goals	Club
1	GK	Wardy Alfaro	31 December 1977 (aged 29)	2	0	(Costa Rican Football Federation) Alajuelense
2	DF	Jervis Drummond	8 September 1976 (aged 30)	37	0	(Costa Rican Football Federation) Saprissa
3	DF	Víctor Cordero	9 November 1973 (aged 33)	28	0	(Costa Rican Football Federation) Saprissa
4	DF	Michael Umaña	16 July 1982 (aged 24)	21	0	(Costa Rican Football Federation) CS Herediano
5	DF	Freddy Fernández	25 February 1974 (aged 33)	2	0	(Costa Rican Football Federation) Municipal
6	DF	Andrés Núñez	27 July 1976 (aged 30)	4	0	(Costa Rican Football Federation) Saprissa
7	FW	Rolando Fonseca	6 June 1974 (aged 33)	86	41	(Costa Rican Football Federation) Alajuelense
8	MF	Rodolfo Rodríguez	27 February 1980 (aged 27)	0	0	(Costa Rican Football Federation) Brujas
9	MF	Alonso Solís	14 October 1978 (aged 28)	22	3	(Costa Rican Football Federation) Saprissa
10	MF	Walter Centeno	6 October 1974 (aged 32)	96	15	(Costa Rican Football Federation) Saprissa
11	MF	Michael Barrantes	4 October 1983 (aged 23)	12	0	(Costa Rican Football Federation) Puntarenas
12	DF	Leonardo González	21 November 1980 (aged 26)	48	1	(Costa Rican Football Federation) Herediano
13	FW	Allan Alemán	29 July 1983 (aged 23)	3	0	(Costa Rican Football Federation) Saprissa
14	MF	Randall Azofeifa	30 December 1984 (aged 22)	6	0	(Royal Belgian Football Association) Gent
15	DF	Harold Wallace	7 September 1975 (aged 31)	84	3	(Costa Rican Football Federation) Alajuelense
16	DF	Christian Bolaños	17 May 1984 (aged 23)	18	1	(Danish Football Association) Odense Boldklub
17	DF	Gabriel Badilla	30 June 1984 (aged 22)	8	0	(Costa Rican Football Federation) Saprissa
18	GK	José Porras (c)	8 November 1970 (aged 36)	19	0	(Costa Rican Football Federation) Saprissa
19	FW	Álvaro Saborío	25 March 1982 (aged 25)	25	7	(Swiss Football Association) Sion
20	DF	Pablo Chinchilla	21 December 1978 (aged 28)	35	1	(Austrian Football Association) Rheindorf Altach
21	FW	Windell Gabriels	1 February 1985 (aged 22)	5	0	(Costa Rican Football Federation) Municipal Pérez Zeledón
22	FW	Mario Camacho	7 August 1983 (aged 23)	2	0	(Costa Rican Football Federation) Puntarenas
23	GK	Dexter Lewis	2 February 1981 (aged 26)	0	0	(Costa Rican Football Federation) Municipal

=== Guadeloupe ===
Head coach: (France) Roger Salnot

No.	Pos.	Player	Date of birth (age)	Caps	Goals	Club
1	GK	Franck Grandel	17 March 1978 (aged 29)			(Royal Dutch Football Association) Utrecht
2	DF	Miguel Comminges	16 March 1982 (aged 25)			(French Football Federation) Reims
3	MF	Willy Laurence	3 April 1984 (aged 23)			(Ligue guadeloupéenne de football) L'Etoile de Morne-à-l'Eau
4	DF	Philippe Durpes	6 March 1974 (aged 33)			(French Football Federation) Romorantin
5	MF	Constant Therezine	23 September 1974 (aged 32)			(Ligue guadeloupéenne de football) Gosier
6	DF	Alain Vertot	14 November 1972 (aged 34)			(Ligue guadeloupéenne de football) L'Etoile de Morne-à-l'Eau
7	MF	Dominique Mocka	13 August 1978 (aged 28)			(Ligue guadeloupéenne de football) JS Vieux-Habitants
8	MF	Stéphane Auvray	4 September 1981 (aged 25)			(French Football Federation) Vannes
9	FW	Ludovic Gotin	25 July 1985 (aged 21)			(Ligue guadeloupéenne de football) Moulien
10	FW	Aurélien Capoue	28 February 1982 (aged 25)			(French Football Federation) Nantes
11	FW	Fabien Raddas	7 March 1980 (aged 27)			(French Football Federation) Poissy
12	FW	Cédrick Fiston	12 April 1981 (aged 26)			(Ligue guadeloupéenne de football) AJSS
13	MF	Jean-Luc Lambourde	10 April 1980 (aged 27)			(Ligue guadeloupéenne de football) Amical
14	DF	David Sommeil	10 August 1974 (aged 32)			(The Football Association) Sheffield United
15	MF	Jocelyn Angloma	7 August 1965 (aged 41)			(Ligue guadeloupéenne de football) L'Etoile de Morne-à-l'Eau
16	GK	Fabrice Mercury	6 August 1981 (aged 25)			(Ligue guadeloupéenne de football) Moulien
17	MF	Léry Hanany	1 October 1982 (aged 24)			(Ligue guadeloupéenne de football) Basse-Terre
18	MF	Ludovic Quistin	24 May 1984 (aged 23)			(The Football Association) Tamworth
19	FW	Richard Socrier	28 March 1979 (aged 28)			(French Football Federation) Brest 29
20	DF	Mickaël Tacalfred	23 April 1981 (aged 26)			(French Football Federation) Dijon
21	DF	David Fleurival	19 February 1984 (aged 23)			(French Football Federation) Tours
22	FW	Loïc Loval	28 September 1981 (aged 25)			(Royal Dutch Football Association) Utrecht
23	GK	Marius Fausta	28 April 1973 (aged 34)			(Ligue guadeloupéenne de football) Evolucas

=== Haiti ===
Head coach: (Cuba) Luis Armelio García

No.	Pos.	Player	Date of birth (age)	Caps	Goals	Club
1	GK	Gabard Fénélon	3 June 1981 (aged 26)			(United States Soccer Federation) Miami
2	MF	Jean Sony Alcénat	23 January 1986 (aged 21)			(Haitian Football Federation) Aigle Noir
3	DF	Frantz Gilles	1 November 1977 (aged 29)			(Haitian Football Federation) Cavaly
4	MF	Peter Germain	22 January 1982 (aged 25)			(Haitian Football Federation) Baltimore
6	DF	Stéphane Guillaume	9 February 1984 (aged 23)			(United States Soccer Federation) Miami
7	FW	Brunel Fucien	26 August 1984 (aged 22)			(Haitian Football Federation) Aigle Noir
8	MF	Turlien Romulus	13 April 1981 (aged 26)			(Haitian Football Federation) Cavaly
9	FW	Éliphène Cadet	10 August 1980 (aged 26)			(Haitian Football Federation) Tempête
10	MF	Alexandre Boucicaut	18 November 1981 (aged 25)			(Haitian Football Federation) Violette
11	FW	Fabrice Noël	21 July 1985 (aged 21)			(Puerto Rican Football Federation) Puerto Rico Islanders
12	MF	James Marcelin	13 June 1986 (aged 20)			(Haitian Football Federation) Racing Club Haïtien
13	DF	Pierre Richard Bruny	6 April 1972 (aged 35)			(Haitian Football Federation) Don Bosco
14	MF	Monès Chéry	2 December 1981 (aged 25)			(Haitian Football Federation) Racing Club Haïtien
15	DF	Ednerson Raymond	14 May 1985 (aged 22)			(Haitian Football Federation) Baltimore
17	MF	Pierre Roland Saint-Jean	21 June 1971 (aged 35)			(Haitian Football Federation) Baltimore
18	DF	Olrish Saurel	13 September 1985 (aged 21)			(Haitian Football Federation) Don Bosco
19	FW	Ricardo Pierre-Louis	10 May 1984 (aged 23)			(United States Soccer Federation) Lee Flames
20	GK	Peterson Occénat	3 December 1989 (aged 17)			(Haitian Football Federation) Violette
21	DF	Jean-Jacques Pierre	23 January 1981 (aged 26)			(French Football Federation) Nantes
22	DF	Windsor Noncent	12 June 1984 (aged 22)			(French Football Federation) Levallois SC
23	DF	Frantz Bertin	30 May 1983 (aged 24)			(Royal Spanish Football Federation) Atlético Madrid B
25	GK	Jonas Simeon	13 August 1979 (aged 27)			(Haitian Football Federation) Tempête

== Group B ==
=== El Salvador ===
Head coach: (Mexico) Carlos de los Cobos

No.	Pos.	Player	Date of birth (age)	Caps	Goals	Club
1	GK	Juan José Gómez	11 August 1980 (aged 26)	42	0	(Salvadoran Football Federation) Luís Ángel Firpo
2	DF	Leonel Guevara	7 October 1983 (aged 23)	2	0	(Salvadoran Football Federation) Vista Hermosa
3	DF	Luis Anaya	19 May 1981 (aged 26)	9	0	(Salvadoran Football Federation) Águila
4	DF	José Mendoza	2 December 1982 (aged 24)	6	0	(Salvadoran Football Federation) Águila
5	DF	José Henríquez	25 May 1987 (aged 20)	4	0	(Salvadoran Football Federation) FAS
6	MF	José Martínez	30 September 1979 (aged 27)	26	2	(Salvadoran Football Federation) Alianza
7	MF	Víctor Merino	18 April 1979 (aged 28)	16	0	(Salvadoran Football Federation) Luís Ángel Firpo
8	MF	Carlos Menjívar	13 April 1981 (aged 26)	17	0	(Salvadoran Football Federation) FAS
9	FW	Alexander Campos	8 May 1980 (aged 27)	20	0	(Salvadoran Football Federation) Águila
10	MF	Vicente Melgar	6 September 1982 (aged 24)	0	0	(Salvadoran Football Federation) Chalatenango
11	FW	Ronald Cerritos	3 January 1975 (aged 32)	54	4	(Salvadoran Football Federation) San Salvador
12	DF	Ramiro Carballo	16 March 1978 (aged 29)	13	0	(Salvadoran Football Federation) Alianza
13	FW	Julio Enrique Martínez	8 July 1985 (aged 21)	1	0	(Salvadoran Football Federation) Isidro Metapán
14	MF	Ramón Sánchez	25 May 1982 (aged 25)	12	0	(Salvadoran Football Federation) San Salvador
15	DF	Manuel Salazar	23 January 1986 (aged 21)	7	0	(Salvadoran Football Federation) Luís Ángel Firpo
16	FW	César Larios	21 April 1988 (aged 19)	2	0	(Salvadoran Football Federation) FAS
17	MF	Dennis Alas	10 January 1985 (aged 22)	28	1	(Salvadoran Football Federation) San Salvador
18	DF	Alexander Escobar	4 April 1984 (aged 23)	9	0	(Salvadoran Football Federation) Isidro Metapán
19	DF	Alfredo Pacheco	1 December 1982 (aged 24)	34	3	(Salvadoran Football Federation) FAS
20	MF	Francisco Jovel Álvarez	24 November 1982 (aged 24)	1	0	(Salvadoran Football Federation) Alianza
21	MF	Eliseo Quintanilla	5 February 1983 (aged 24)	13	4	(Salvadoran Football Federation) San Salvador
22	GK	Dagoberto Portillo	16 November 1979 (aged 27)	1	0	(Salvadoran Football Federation) Alianza
23	GK	Miguel Montes	12 February 1980 (aged 27)	1	0	(Salvadoran Football Federation) Chalatenango

=== Guatemala ===
Head coach: (Colombia) Hernán Darío Gómez

No.	Pos.	Player	Date of birth (age)	Caps	Goals	Club
1	GK	Ricardo Alberto Trigueño	17 April 1980 (aged 27)			(National Football Federation of Guatemala) Marquense
2	MF	Leonel Noriega	10 May 1975 (aged 32)			(National Football Federation of Guatemala) Marquense
3	DF	Pablo Sebastián Melgar	14 January 1980 (aged 27)	55		(Football Federation of Chile) CD Antofagasta
4	DF	Yony Flores	16 February 1983 (aged 24)			(National Football Federation of Guatemala) Marquense
5	DF	Henry Medina	16 March 1981 (aged 26)			(National Football Federation of Guatemala) Municipal
6	DF	Gustavo Cabrera	13 December 1979 (aged 27)	50		(National Football Federation of Guatemala) Comunicaciones
7	DF	Claudio Albizuris	1 July 1981 (aged 25)			(National Football Federation of Guatemala) CSD Municipal
8	MF	José Manuel Contreras	19 January 1986 (aged 21)			(National Football Federation of Guatemala) Comunicaciones
9	FW	Edwin Villatoro	18 February 1980 (aged 27)			(National Football Federation of Guatemala) Municipal
11	FW	Marvin Ávila	6 December 1985 (aged 21)			(National Football Federation of Guatemala) Suchitepéquez
12	MF	Carlos Figueroa	13 March 1981 (aged 26)			(National Football Federation of Guatemala) Municipal
13	DF	Néstor Martínez	13 March 1981 (aged 26)			(National Football Federation of Guatemala) Marquense
14	MF	Rigoberto Gómez	9 January 1977 (aged 30)			(National Football Federation of Guatemala) Comunicaciones
15	DF	Luis Swisher	2 June 1978 (aged 29)			(National Football Federation of Guatemala) Xelajú
16	MF	Héctor Saúl de Matta	17 April 1980 (aged 27)			(National Football Federation of Guatemala) Communicaciones
17	FW	Dwight Pezzarossi	4 September 1979 (aged 27)	47	10	(National Football Federation of Guatemala) Communicaciones
18	MF	Carlos Quiñónez	20 July 1977 (aged 29)			(National Football Federation of Guatemala) Marquense
19	MF	Mario Rafael Rodríguez	14 September 1981 (aged 25)	38	4	(National Football Federation of Guatemala) Municipal
20	FW	Carlos Ruíz	15 September 1979 (aged 27)	68	34	(United States Soccer Federation) FC Dallas
22	GK	Luis Pedro Molina	4 June 1977 (aged 30)			(National Football Federation of Guatemala) Jalapa
23	FW	Hernan Sandoval	22 July 1983 (aged 23)			(National Football Federation of Guatemala) Communicaciones
25	GK	Paulo César Motta	29 March 1982 (aged 25)			(National Football Federation of Guatemala) Municipal
27	FW	Jairo Arreola	20 September 1985 (aged 21)			(National Football Federation of Guatemala) CSD Comunicaciones

=== Trinidad and Tobago ===
Head coach: (Netherlands) Wim Rijsbergen

No.	Pos.	Player	Date of birth (age)	Caps	Goals	Club
1	GK	Daurance Williams	13 May 1983 (aged 24)			(Trinidad and Tobago Football Association) San Juan Jabloteh
2	MF	Romauld Aguillera	7 February 1979 (aged 28)			(Trinidad and Tobago Football Association) United Petrotrin
3	DF	Glenton Wolfe	30 December 1981 (aged 25)			(Trinidad and Tobago Football Association) North East Stars
4	MF	Dwayne Jack	19 January 1980 (aged 27)			(Trinidad and Tobago Football Association) San Juan Jabloteh
5	DF	Keyeno Thomas	29 December 1977 (aged 29)			(Trinidad and Tobago Football Association) Joe Public F.C.
6	MF	Thomas Nickcolson	23 January 1982 (aged 25)			(Trinidad and Tobago Football Association) W Connection
7	MF	Trent Noel	14 January 1976 (aged 31)			(Trinidad and Tobago Football Association) San Juan Jabloteh
8	FW	Kerry Baptiste	1 December 1981 (aged 25)			(Trinidad and Tobago Football Association) Joe Public F.C.
9	FW	Errol McFarlane	12 October 1977 (aged 29)			(Trinidad and Tobago Football Association) Superstar Rangers
10	DF	Avery John	18 June 1975 (aged 31)			(United States Soccer Federation) New England Revolution
11	FW	Andre Toussaint	26 August 1981 (aged 25)			(Trinidad and Tobago Football Association) W Connection
12	FW	Gary Glasgow	13 May 1976 (aged 31)			(Trinidad and Tobago Football Association) Joe Public F.C.
13	MF	Christon Baptiste	25 January 1980 (aged 27)			(Trinidad and Tobago Football Association) Defence Force
14	FW	Darryl Roberts	26 September 1983 (aged 23)			(Royal Dutch Football Association) Sparta Rotterdam
15	DF	Andrei Pacheco	9 September 1984 (aged 22)			(Trinidad and Tobago Football Association) W Connection
16	MF	Silvio Spann	21 August 1981 (aged 25)			(Trinidad and Tobago Football Association) W Connection
17	DF	Seon Power	2 February 1984 (aged 23)			(Trinidad and Tobago Football Association) Joe Public F.C.
18	MF	Densill Theobald	27 June 1982 (aged 24)			(Trinidad and Tobago Football Association) Caledonia AIA
19	MF	Keon Daniel	16 January 1987 (aged 20)			(Trinidad and Tobago Football Association) United Petrotrin
20	DF	Anthony Noreiga	15 January 1982 (aged 25)			(Trinidad and Tobago Football Association) Joe Public F.C.
21	GK	Jan Michael Williams	26 October 1984 (aged 22)			(Trinidad and Tobago Football Association) W Connection
22	GK	Marvin Phillip	1 August 1984 (aged 22)			(Trinidad and Tobago Football Association) North East Stars
23	FW	Kendall Jagdeosingh	30 May 1986 (aged 21)			(Trinidad and Tobago Football Association) North East Stars

- With the exception of Densill Theobald and Avery John, all players who participated in the 2006 FIFA World Cup boycotted the Gold Cup because they had yet to get their World Cup bonuses paid.

=== United States ===
Head coach: (United States) Bob Bradley

No.	Pos.	Player	Date of birth (age)	Caps	Goals	Club
1	GK	Tim Howard	6 March 1979 (aged 28)	18	0	(The Football Association) Everton
2	DF	Frankie Hejduk	5 August 1974 (aged 32)	72	5	(United States Soccer Federation) Columbus Crew
3	DF	Carlos Bocanegra (c)	25 May 1979 (aged 28)	44	6	(The Football Association) Fulham
4	MF	Pablo Mastroeni	26 August 1976 (aged 30)	52	0	(United States Soccer Federation) Colorado Rapids
5	DF	Benny Feilhaber	19 January 1985 (aged 22)	2	0	(German Football Association) Hamburger SV
6	MF	Michael Bradley	31 July 1987 (aged 19)	4	0	(Royal Dutch Football Association) Heerenveen
7	FW	DaMarcus Beasley	24 May 1982 (aged 25)	62	12	(Royal Dutch Football Association) PSV
8	FW	Clint Dempsey	9 March 1983 (aged 24)	26	6	(The Football Association) Fulham
9	FW	Eddie Johnson	31 March 1984 (aged 23)	24	9	(United States Soccer Federation) Kansas City Wizards
10	FW	Landon Donovan	4 March 1982 (aged 25)	88	30	(United States Soccer Federation) Los Angeles Galaxy
11	FW	Brian Ching	24 May 1978 (aged 29)	21	4	(United States Soccer Federation) Houston Dynamo
12	DF	Jay DeMerit	4 December 1979 (aged 27)	1	0	(The Football Association) Watford
13	MF	Jonathan Bornstein	7 November 1984 (aged 22)	2	1	(United States Soccer Federation) Chivas USA
14	MF	Steve Ralston	14 June 1974 (aged 32)	32	4	(United States Soccer Federation) New England Revolution
15	DF	Frankie Simek	13 October 1984 (aged 22)	1	0	(The Football Association) Sheffield Wednesday
16	DF	Michael Parkhurst	24 January 1984 (aged 23)	0	0	(United States Soccer Federation) New England Revolution
17	MF	Jonathan Spector	1 March 1986 (aged 21)	5	0	(The Football Association) West Ham United
18	GK	Kasey Keller	29 November 1969 (aged 37)	87	0	(German Football Association) Borussia Mönchengladbach
19	MF	Ricardo Clark	10 February 1983 (aged 24)	3	0	(United States Soccer Federation) Houston Dynamo
20	FW	Taylor Twellman	29 February 1980 (aged 27)	20	5	(United States Soccer Federation) New England Revolution
21	MF	Justin Mapp	18 October 1984 (aged 22)	2	0	(United States Soccer Federation) Chicago Fire
22	DF	Oguchi Onyewu	13 May 1982 (aged 25)	18	1	(Royal Belgian Football Association) Standard Liège
23	GK	Brad Guzan	9 September 1984 (aged 22)	1	0	(United States Soccer Federation) Chivas USA

== Group C ==
=== Cuba ===
Head coach: (Cuba) Raúl González

No.	Pos.	Player	Date of birth (age)	Caps	Goals	Club
1	GK	Odelín Molina	3 August 1974 (aged 32)			(Football Association of Cuba) FC Villa Clara
2	DF	Silvio Pedro Miñoso	23 December 1976 (aged 30)			(Football Association of Cuba) FC Villa Clara
3	DF	Yenier Márquez	3 January 1979 (aged 28)			(Football Association of Cuba) FC Villa Clara
4	MF	Yusvanys Caballeros	10 December 1983 (aged 23)			(Football Association of Cuba) FC Ciudad de La Habana
5	DF	Jorge Luis Clavelo	8 August 1982 (aged 24)			(Football Association of Cuba) FC Villa Clara
6	MF	Osvaldo Alonso*	11 November 1985 (aged 21)			(Football Association of Cuba) FC Pinar del Río
7	FW	Ariel Martínez	9 May 1986 (aged 21)			(Football Association of Cuba) FC Sancti Spíritus
8	DF	Yoel Colomé	15 October 1982 (aged 24)			(Football Association of Cuba) FC Ciudad de La Habana
9	FW	Alain Cervantes	17 November 1983 (aged 23)			(Football Association of Cuba) FC Ciego de Ávila
10	FW	Lester Moré*	13 September 1978 (aged 28)			(Football Association of Cuba) FC Ciego de Ávila
11	MF	Enrique Villaurrutia	24 April 1985 (aged 22)			(Football Association of Cuba) FC Cienfuegos
12	GK	Dany Luis Quintero	10 December 1984 (aged 22)			(Football Association of Cuba) FC Cienfuegos
13	FW	Adonis Ramos	28 June 1985 (aged 21)			(Football Association of Cuba) CF Granma
14	DF	Jaime Colomé	13 June 1979 (aged 27)			(Football Association of Cuba) FC Ciudad de La Habana
15	MF	Gisbel Morales	13 October 1978 (aged 28)			(Football Association of Cuba) FC Pinar del Río
16	DF	Reysander Fernández	22 August 1984 (aged 22)			(Football Association of Cuba) FC Ciego de Ávila
17	FW	Pedro Adriani Faife	14 January 1984 (aged 23)			(Football Association of Cuba) FC Villa Clara
18	FW	Reyner Alcántara	14 January 1982 (aged 25)			(Football Association of Cuba) FC Cienfuegos
19	FW	Leonel Duarte	1 August 1987 (aged 19)			(Football Association of Cuba) FC Ciego de Ávila
21	GK	Julio Aldama	12 March 1981 (aged 26)			(Football Association of Cuba) FC Matanzas

- * Defected the team after Gold Cup match against Panama

=== Honduras ===
Head coach: (Colombia) Reinaldo Rueda

No.	Pos.	Player	Date of birth (age)	Caps	Goals	Club
1	GK	Adalid Puerto	14 September 1979 (aged 27)			(National Autonomous Federation of Football of Honduras) CD Platense
3	DF	Maynor Figueroa	2 May 1983 (aged 24)			(National Autonomous Federation of Football of Honduras) CD Olimpia
4	DF	Samuel Caballero	24 December 1974 (aged 32)			(Chinese Football Association) Changchun Yatai
5	DF	Érick Vallecillo	29 January 1980 (aged 27)			(National Autonomous Federation of Football of Honduras) Real C.D. España
6	MF	Sergio Mendoza	23 May 1981 (aged 26)			(National Autonomous Federation of Football of Honduras) CD Olimpia
7	MF	Emil Martínez	17 September 1982 (aged 24)			(National Autonomous Federation of Football of Honduras) CD Marathón
8	MF	Wilson Palacios	29 July 1984 (aged 22)			(National Autonomous Federation of Football of Honduras) CD Olimpia
9	FW	Carlos Pavón	9 October 1973 (aged 33)		42	(National Autonomous Federation of Football of Honduras) Real C.D. España
10	MF	Julio César de León	13 September 1979 (aged 27)			(Italian Football Federation) Genoa
11	FW	Jairo Martínez	14 May 1978 (aged 29)			(National Autonomous Federation of Football of Honduras) C.D. Motagua
12	GK	Orlin Vallecillo	1 July 1983 (aged 23)			(National Autonomous Federation of Football of Honduras) Real C.D. España
13	FW	Carlos Costly	18 July 1982 (aged 24)	1	1	(Polish Football Association) GKS Belchatów
14	DF	Oscar Boniek García	4 September 1984 (aged 22)			(National Autonomous Federation of Football of Honduras) CD Olimpia
15	FW	Walter Martínez	28 July 1979 (aged 27)			(Chinese Football Association) Beijing Guoan
16	FW	Carlos Oliva	28 July 1979 (aged 27)			(National Autonomous Federation of Football of Honduras) CD Marathón
17	DF	Edgar Álvarez	8 January 1980 (aged 27)			(Italian Football Federation) F.C. Messina Peloro
18	MF	Jorge Aaron Claros	8 January 1986 (aged 21)			(National Autonomous Federation of Football of Honduras) C.D. Motagua
19	MF	Mario Rodríguez	31 July 1975 (aged 31)			(National Autonomous Federation of Football of Honduras) Real C.D. España
20	MF	Amado Guevara	2 May 1976 (aged 31)			(National Autonomous Federation of Football of Honduras) C.D. Motagua
21	DF	Emilio Izaguirre	10 May 1986 (aged 21)			(National Autonomous Federation of Football of Honduras) C.D. Motagua
22	GK	Donaldo Morales	13 October 1982 (aged 24)			(National Autonomous Federation of Football of Honduras) C.D. Motagua
23	MF	Iván Guerrero	30 November 1977 (aged 29)			(United States Soccer Federation) Chicago Fire
24	FW	Luis Santamaría	22 November 1975 (aged 31)			(National Autonomous Federation of Football of Honduras) CD Marathón

=== Mexico ===
Head coach: (Mexico) Hugo Sánchez

No.	Pos.	Player	Date of birth (age)	Caps	Goals	Club
1	GK	Oswaldo Sánchez	21 September 1973 (aged 33)	76	0	(Mexican Football Federation) Santos Laguna
2	DF	Jonny Magallón	21 November 1981 (aged 25)	3	0	(Mexican Football Federation) Guadalajara
3	DF	Carlos Salcido	4 April 1980 (aged 27)	37	2	(Royal Dutch Football Association) PSV
4	DF	Rafael Márquez	13 February 1979 (aged 28)	76	8	(Royal Spanish Football Federation) Barcelona
5	DF	Ricardo Osorio	30 March 1980 (aged 27)	46	1	(German Football Association) VfB Stuttgart
6	MF	Gerardo Torrado	30 April 1979 (aged 28)	64	2	(Mexican Football Federation) Cruz Azul
7	FW	Alberto Medina	29 May 1983 (aged 24)	29	2	(Mexican Football Federation) Guadalajara
8	MF	Pável Pardo	26 July 1976 (aged 30)	133	6	(German Football Association) VfB Stuttgart
9	FW	Jared Borgetti	14 August 1973 (aged 33)	80	40	(Mexican Football Federation) Cruz Azul
10	FW	Cuauhtémoc Blanco	17 January 1973 (aged 34)	88	31	(United States Soccer Federation) Chicago Fire
11	MF	Ramón Morales	10 October 1975 (aged 31)	48	5	(Mexican Football Federation) Guadalajara
12	GK	José de Jesús Corona	26 January 1981 (aged 26)	6	0	(Mexican Football Federation) UAG
13	GK	Guillermo Ochoa	13 July 1985 (aged 21)	4	0	(Mexican Football Federation) América
14	DF	Fausto Pinto	8 August 1983 (aged 23)	0	0	(Mexican Football Federation) Pachuca
15	DF	José Antonio Castro	11 August 1980 (aged 26)	16	0	(Mexican Football Federation) América
16	MF	Jaime Lozano	29 September 1979 (aged 27)	25	11	(Mexican Football Federation) UANL
17	FW	Francisco Fonseca	2 October 1979 (aged 27)	36	20	(Mexican Football Federation) UANL
18	MF	Andrés Guardado	28 September 1986 (aged 20)	12	1	(Mexican Football Federation) Atlas
19	FW	Omar Bravo	4 March 1980 (aged 27)	39	10	(Mexican Football Federation) Guadalajara
20	MF	Fernando Arce	24 April 1980 (aged 27)	12	1	(Mexican Football Federation) Morelia
21	FW	Nery Castillo	13 June 1984 (aged 22)	3	1	(Hellenic Football Federation) Olympiacos
22	DF	Francisco Javier Rodríguez	20 October 1981 (aged 25)	33	1	(Mexican Football Federation) Guadalajara
23	FW	Adolfo Bautista	15 May 1979 (aged 28)	21	8	(Mexican Football Federation) Chiapas

=== Panama ===
Head coach: (Costa Rica) Alexandre Guimarães

No.	Pos.	Player	Date of birth (age)	Caps	Goals	Club
1	GK	Jaime Penedo	26 September 1981 (aged 25)			(Royal Spanish Football Federation) CA Osasuna
2	DF	Carlos Rivera	30 May 1979 (aged 28)			(Panamanian Football Federation) Tauro F.C.
3	DF	Luis Moreno	19 March 1981 (aged 26)			(Panamanian Football Federation) Tauro F.C.
4	MF	Juan Pérez	1 January 1980 (aged 27)			(Panamanian Football Federation) Tauro F.C.
5	DF	Román Torres	20 March 1986 (aged 21)			(Colombian Football Federation) La Equidad
6	DF	Gabriel Gómez	29 May 1984 (aged 23)			(Colombian Football Federation) Independiente Santa Fe
7	FW	Blas Pérez	13 March 1981 (aged 26)			(Colombian Football Federation) Cúcuta Deportivo
8	MF	Alberto Blanco	8 January 1978 (aged 29)			(Panamanian Football Federation) Plaza Amador
9	FW	José Luis Garcés	6 May 1981 (aged 26)			(Portuguese Football Federation) C.F. Os Belenenses
10	MF	Rolando Escobar	24 October 1981 (aged 25)			(Panamanian Football Federation) Tauro F.C.
12	GK	Oscar McFarlane	29 November 1980 (aged 26)			(Panamanian Football Federation) Tauro F.C.
13	FW	Edwin Aguilar	7 August 1985 (aged 21)			(Panamanian Football Federation) Tauro F.C.
14	MF	Manuel Torres	25 November 1978 (aged 28)			(Panamanian Football Federation) San Francisco F.C.
15	MF	Ricardo Phillips	31 January 1975 (aged 32)			(Panamanian Football Federation) San Francisco F.C.
17	MF	Luis Henríquez	23 November 1981 (aged 25)			(Panamanian Football Federation) Tauro F.C.
19	FW	Nicolás Muñoz	21 December 1981 (aged 25)			(Salvadoran Football Federation) C.D. Águila
20	MF	Engin Mitre	16 October 1981 (aged 25)			(Panamanian Football Federation) Plaza Amador
21	MF	Amilcar Henríquez	2 August 1983 (aged 23)			(Panamanian Football Federation) CD Árabe Unido
22	MF	Victor Herrera	18 April 1980 (aged 27)			(Puerto Rican Football Federation) Puerto Rico Islanders
23	DF	Felipe Baloy	24 February 1981 (aged 26)			(Mexican Football Federation) C.F. Monterrey
25	GK	José Calderón	14 August 1985 (aged 21)			(Panamanian Football Federation) Chepo F.C.
26	DF	Reinaldo Anderson	12 April 1986 (aged 21)			(Panamanian Football Federation) CD Árabe Unido
