= Bahamas national football team results =

These are the results of the Bahamas national football team.

== Key ==
Key to matches

- Att. = Match attendance
- (H) = Home ground
- (A) = Away ground
- (N) = Neutral venue
- — = Match attendance not known

Key to record by opponent

- P = Games played
- W = Games won
- D = Games drawn
- L = Games lost
- GF = Goals for
- GA = Goals against

== Results ==
Date	Location	Opponents	Score^{[A]}	Competition	Att.	Bahamas scorers
3 March 1970	Panama(N)	Netherlands Antilles	1 – 8	Friendly		?
8 March 1970	Panama(N)	Puerto Rico	0 – 3	Friendly		
14 April 1971	Haiti(A)	Haiti	0 – 8	Friendly		
28 February 1974	Dominican Republic(N)	Panama	1 – 0	1974 Central American and Caribbean Games		?
4 March 1974	Dominican Republic(N)	Dominican Republic	0 – 2	1974 Central American and Caribbean Games		
6 March 1974	Dominican Republic(N)	Bermuda	0 – 3	1974 Central American and Caribbean Games		
2 August 1982	Cuba(N)	Puerto Rico	1 – 4	1982 Central American and Caribbean Games		?
6 August 1982	Cuba(N)	Bermuda	0 – 3	1982 Central American and Caribbean Games		
10 August 1982	Cuba(A)	Cuba	0 – 1	1982 Central American and Caribbean Games		
30 June 30 1986	Dominican Republic(N)	Cuba	0 – 1	Friendly		
29 March 1987	Bahamas(H)	Mexico	0 – 3	Friendly		
28 April 1987	Mexico(A)	Mexico	0 – 13	Friendly		
24 February 1999	Bahamas(H)	Turks and Caicos Islands	3 – 0	1999 Caribbean Nations Cup; Preliminary round		?
28 February 1999	Bahamas(H)	U.S. Virgin Islands	0 – 0	1999 Caribbean Nations Cup; Preliminary round		
5 May 1999	Bermuda(A)	Bermuda	0 – 6	1999 Caribbean Nations Cup; Qualifying round		
7 May 1999	Bermuda(N)	Cuba	0 – 7	1999 Caribbean Nations Cup; Qualifying round		
9 May 1999	Bermuda(N)	Cayman Islands	1 – 4	1999 Caribbean Nations Cup; Qualifying round		?
23 September 1999	Cayman Islands(A)	Cayman Islands	0 – 4	Friendly		
5 March 2000	Anguilla(A)	Anguilla	3 – 1	2002 FIFA World Cup qualification		Haven 12'; Moussis 29'; Davies 32'
19 March 2000	Bahamas(H)	Anguilla	2 – 1	2002 FIFA World Cup qualification		Haven 16'; Davies 77'
1 April 2000	Haiti(A)	Haiti	0 – 9	2002 FIFA World Cup qualification		
16 April 2000	Bahamas(H)	Haiti	0 – 4	2002 FIFA World Cup qualification		
21 October 2001	Bahamas(H)	Haiti	0 – 2	Friendly		
27 December 2003	United States(N)	Haiti	0 – 6	Friendly		
26 March 2004	Bahamas(H)	Dominica	1 – 1	2006 FIFA World Cup qualification		Horton 66'
28 March 2004	Bahamas(H)	Dominica	1 – 3	2006 FIFA World Cup qualification		Jean 67'
2 September 2006	Cuba(N)	Cayman Islands	3 – 1	2006–07 Caribbean Nations Cup First qualifying round		Rivers 6' (o.g.); R. Moseley 35'; Thompson 80'
4 September 2006	Cuba(A)	Cuba	0 – 6	2006–07 Caribbean Nations Cup First qualifying round		
6 September 2006	Cuba(N)	Turks and Caicos Islands	3 – 2	2006–07 Caribbean Nations Cup First qualifying round		Nassies 59'; Hall 63'; Jean 87'
19 November 2006	Barbados(A)	Barbados	1 – 2	2006–07 Caribbean Nations Cup Second qualifying round		Jean 76' (pen.)
21 November 2006	Barbados(N)	Bermuda	0 – 4	2006–07 Caribbean Nations Cup Second qualifying round		
23 November 2006	Barbados(N)	Saint Vincent and the Grenadines	2 – 3	2006–07 Caribbean Nations Cup Second qualifying round		Christie 55'; J. Moseley 65'
26 March 2008	Bahamas(H)	British Virgin Islands	1 – 1	2010 FIFA World Cup qualification		St.Fleur 47'
30 March 2008	Bahamas(H)	British Virgin Islands	2 – 2	2010 FIFA World Cup qualification		Bethel 40'; Mitchell 52'
15 June 2008	Jamaica(A)	Jamaica	0 – 7	2010 FIFA World Cup qualification		
18 June 2008	Jamaica(A)	Jamaica	0 – 6	2010 FIFA World Cup qualification		
2 July 2011	Turks and Caicos Islands(A)	Turks and Caicos Islands	4 – 0	2014 FIFA World Cup qualification		Jean 32', 60'; Hepple 34' (pen.); Louis 90+2'
9 July 2011	Bahamas(H)	Turks and Caicos Islands	6 – 0	2014 FIFA World Cup qualification		Gibson 4' (o.g.); St.Fleur 17', 64', 73', 86', 90'
25 March 2015	Bahamas(H)	Bermuda	0 – 5	2018 FIFA World Cup qualification		
29 March 2015	Bermuda(A)	Bermuda	0 – 3	2018 FIFA World Cup qualification		
