= 2007 Caribbean Cup =

Digicel Caribbean Cup 2007

Tournament details
- Host country: Trinidad and Tobago
- Dates: 2 September 2006 – 9 January 2007 (qualifiers); 12 January 2007 – 23 January 2007 (finals)
- Teams: 25 (from 1 confederation)
- Venues: 12 (in 10 host cities)

Final positions
- Champions: Haiti (1st title)
- Runners-up: Trinidad and Tobago
- Third place: Cuba
- Fourth place: Guadeloupe

Tournament statistics
- Matches played: 72
- Goals scored: 251 (3.49 per match)
- Top scorer: (Guyana) Nigel Codrington (11 goals)

The 2007 Caribbean Cup (known as the Digicel Caribbean Cup for sponsorship reasons) was the fourteenth edition of the biennial Caribbean Cup, the finals of which were contested in Trinidad and Tobago between 12 January and 23 January 2007. The four semifinalists (Cuba, Guadeloupe, Haiti, and hosts Trinidad and Tobago) qualified for the 2007 edition of the CONCACAF Gold Cup. In all, 24 of the eligible countries participated (5 did not enter and 1 withdrew).

Haiti eventually won the tournament despite having to qualify for the finals through a play-off of third-place teams from the second round and finishing second in its final-round group. Haiti beat eight-time champion and host Trinidad and Tobago in the final, although Trinidad and Tobago was missing overseas players that had helped them qualify for the 2006 FIFA World Cup. Guadeloupe were the surprise of the tournament, as former French international Jocelyn Angloma came out of retirement to help the team advance to the semifinals, qualifying for its first Gold Cup in the process. Cuba continued its development in the region by finishing in third place.

== Prize money ==
- Haiti, as the winner, received US$120,000 (UK£64,022).
- Trinidad and Tobago, as the runner up, received US$70,000 (UK£37,350).
- Cuba, as the third-place team, received US$50,000 (UK£26,680).
- Guadeloupe, as the fourth-place team, received US$30,000 (UK£16,009).
- Each of the ten host countries received a subsistence package of US$20,000 (UK£10,673). Additionally, the host of the Digicel Caribbean Cup Final received US$150,000 (UK£80,047) to compensate for the increased costs of holding the final round of the competition.

(UK £ values calculated on 28 September 2006)

== First qualifying round ==
Trinidad and Tobago received a bye to the final round. Aruba, French Guiana, Montserrat, Puerto Rico and Sint Maarten did not enter.

=== Summary ===
The first round produced some notable upsets. Guyana surprised many by dominating Group A, and Suriname qualified for the second round as well. Group host Netherlands Antilles finished last by capturing a lone draw. Group B did not go to form, either; though Barbados fulfilled widely held expectations by winning, host Antigua & Barbuda produced a minor shock by also making it out of the group at the expense of St. Kitts & Nevis. St. Kitts had a late penalty kick to be taken by Atiba Harris that if made would have eliminated Antigua & Barbuda in the group's final game, but the Antiguan goalkeeper saved the penalty. Group C went to form, save only that the British Virgin Islands withdrew before group play started. Bermuda expectedly dominated the group. The shocker of the round, though occurred in Group D, where host Jamaica, widely considered the best national footballing side in the Caribbean, did not advance to the second round. Jamaica lost their second game to St. Vincent & Grenadines 2–1. Playing in the final game on the group's last day knowing they had to defeat Haiti by 3 goals to qualify, Jamaica could only muster a 2–0 victory, meaning that St. Vincent & Grenadines pulled the upset and advanced to the second round based on goals scored. Despite their loss to Jamaica, Haiti won the group based on goal differential. Host Cuba won Group E, with the Bahamas advancing as well by defeating a surprisingly competitive Turks & Caicos team. In Group F, the French departments of Martinique and host Guadeloupe carried on easily, with the host winning the group.

=== Group A ===
Played in Netherlands Antilles at Stadion Ergilio Hato.

Team	Pld	W	D	L	GF	GA	GD	Pts
Guyana	3	3	0	0	11	0	+11	9
Suriname	3	2	0	1	2	5	−3	6
Grenada	3	0	1	2	1	3	−2	1
Netherlands Antilles	3	0	1	2	1	7	−6	1

6 September 2006

Suriname	0–5	Guyana
		Richardson 4'; Codrington 15', 73'; Jerome 42'; Abrams 90'

Stadion Ergilio Hato, Willemstad
Referee: Rudolph Angela (Aruba)
6 September 2006

Netherlands Antilles	1–1	Grenada
Maria 1'		Rennie 52'

Stadion Ergilio Hato, Willemstad
Referee: Willy Minyetty
(Dominican Republic)

8 September 2006

Suriname	1–0	Grenada
Kinsaine 35'

Stadion Ergilio Hato, Willemstad
Referee: Lee Davis
(Trinidad and Tobago)
8 September 2006

Netherlands Antilles	0–5	Guyana
		Codrington (31), 58'; Bishop 64'; Abrams 84'; Jerome 89'

Stadion Ergilio Hato, Willemstad
Referee: Felix Suazo
(Dominican Republic)

10 September 2006

Grenada	0–1	Guyana
		Bishop 46'

Stadion Ergilio Hato, Willemstad
Referee: Rudolph Angela (Aruba)
10 September 2006

Netherlands Antilles	0–1	Suriname
		Grootfaam 4'

Stadion Ergilio Hato, Willemstad
Referee: Felix Suazo
(Dominican Republic)

=== Group B ===
Played in Antigua and Barbuda at Antigua Recreation Ground.

Team	Pld	W	D	L	GF	GA	GD	Pts
Barbados	3	2	1	0	11	3	+8	7
Antigua and Barbuda	3	2	0	1	7	6	+1	6
Saint Kitts and Nevis	3	1	1	1	7	3	+4	4
Anguilla	3	0	0	3	5	18	−13	0

20 September 2006

Barbados	1–1	Saint Kitts and Nevis
Ifill 42'		Harris 60'

Antigua Recreation Ground, St. Johns
Attendance: 300
Referee: Courtney Campbell (Jamaica)
20 September 2006

Antigua and Barbuda	5–3	Anguilla
Byers 8' (pen.), 16', 71' (pen.); T. Thomas 29'; J. Thomas 90+2'		St. Hillaire 13'; Assent 51'; O'Connor 90+1'

Antigua Recreation Ground, St. Johns
Attendance: 300
Referee: Enrico Wijngaarde (Suriname)

22 September 2006

Anguilla	1–6	Saint Kitts and Nevis
O'Connor 20'		Isaac 14', 68', 79'; Lake 30', 47'; Francis 81'

Antigua Recreation Ground, St. Johns
Attendance: 500
Referee: George Phillips (Grenada)
22 September 2006

Antigua and Barbuda	1–3	Barbados
Byers 16'		Williams 47'; McCammon 56'; Lovell 89'

Antigua Recreation Ground, St. Johns
Attendance: 2500
Referee: Hillaren Frederick (US Virgin Islands)

24 September 2006

Antigua and Barbuda	1–0	Saint Kitts and Nevis
Gregory 76'

Antigua Recreation Ground, St. Johns
Attendance: 2800
Referee: Enrico Wijngaard (Suriname)
24 September 2006

Barbados	7–1	Anguilla
McCammon 35', 50', 87'; Ifill 40', 58', 84'; Niblett 75'		Connor 48'

Antigua Recreation Ground, St. Johns
Referee: Courtney Campbell (Jamaica)

=== Group C ===
Played in United States Virgin Islands at Lionel Roberts Park.

Team	Pld	W	D	L	GF	GA	GD	Pts
Bermuda	3	3	0	0	12	1	+11	9
Dominican Republic	3	2	0	1	10	4	+6	6
U.S. Virgin Islands	3	1	0	2	4	12	−8	3
British Virgin Islands	3	0	0	3	0	9	−9	0

27 September 2006

Dominican Republic	3–0^{1 awarded}	British Virgin Islands

Lionel Roberts Park, Saint Thomas
27 September 2006

U.S. Virgin Islands	0–6	Bermuda
		Steede 1', 36'; Coddington 31', 54'; Nusum 38'; Jennings 89'

Lionel Roberts Park, Saint Thomas
Attendance: 150
Referee: Royon Small (Barbados)

29 September 2006

U.S. Virgin Islands	3–0^{1 awarded}	British Virgin Islands

Lionel Roberts Park, Saint Thomas
29 September 2006

Bermuda	3–1	Dominican Republic
Zuill 25'; Cox 48'; Steede 53'		Faña 85'

Lionel Roberts Park, Saint Thomas

1 October 2006

Bermuda	3–0^{1 awarded}	British Virgin Islands

Lionel Roberts Park, Saint Thomas
1 October 2006

U.S. Virgin Islands	1–6	Dominican Republic
Pierre 5'		Corporán 14'; Faña 25', 55', 82', 87'; K. Rodríguez 89'

Lionel Roberts Park, Saint Thomas
Attendance: 250
Referee: Lee Travis (Trinidad and Tobago)

^{1} British Virgin Islands withdrew due to not being able to send a team; their matches were all awarded 3–0 to their opponents.

=== Group D ===
Played in Jamaica at Independence Park.

Team	Pld	W	D	L	GF	GA	GD	Pts
Haiti	3	2	0	1	11	3	+8	6
Saint Vincent and the Grenadines	3	2	0	1	10	5	+5	6
Jamaica	3	2	0	1	7	2	+5	6
Saint Lucia	3	0	0	3	1	19	−18	0

27 September 2006

Haiti	4–0	Saint Vincent and the Grenadines
Mayard 48'; Fritzson 54'; Pierre 79'; Gracien 90+2'

Independence Park, Kingston
Attendance: 3,000
Referee: Mark Forde (Barbados)
27 September 2006

Jamaica	4–0	Saint Lucia
Smith 3'; Lamey 22', 36'; Phillips 30'

Independence Park, Kingston
Attendance: 4,000
Referee: Atilio Tamayo (Cuba)

29 September 2006

Saint Lucia	1–7	Haiti
Valcin 90+3' (pen.)		Jean-Jacques 4', 13'; Fritzson 17', 82'; Chery 42'; Noël 63'; Mayard 80'

Independence Park, Kingston
29 September 2006

Jamaica	1–2	Saint Vincent and the Grenadines
Dean 73'		John 49'; Velox 70'

Independence Park, Kingston

1 October 2006

Saint Vincent and the Grenadines	8–0	Saint Lucia
Douglas 11'; Samuel 25', 42', 56', 76', 90+3'; John 52'; Haynes 84'

National Stadium, Kingston
Attendance: 3,000
Referee: Atilio Tamayo (Cuba)
1 October 2006

Jamaica	2–0	Haiti
Smith 9'; Dawkins 31'

Independence Park, Kingston
Attendance: 3,000
Referee: Neal Brizan (Trinidad and Tobago)

=== Group E ===
All matches were played in Cuba.

Team	Pld	W	D	L	GF	GA	GD	Pts
Cuba	3	3	0	0	19	0	+19	9
Bahamas	3	2	0	1	6	9	−3	6
Turks and Caicos Islands	3	1	0	2	4	9	−5	3
Cayman Islands	3	0	0	3	1	12	−11	0

2 September 2006

Bahamas	3–1	Cayman Islands
Rivers 6' (o.g.); Moseley 35'; Thompson 80'		Whittaker 76'

Estadio Pedro Marrero, Havana
Referee: Victor Stewart (Jamaica)
2 September 2006

Cuba	6–0	Turks and Caicos Islands
Alonso 5'; Arencibia 19'; Alcántara 20', 60', 75'; Ocaña 86'

Estadio Pedro Marrero, Havana
Referee: Courtney Campbell (Jamaica)

4 September 2006

Cayman Islands	0–2	Turks and Caicos Islands
		Glinton 14'; Fleuriot 72'

Estadio Pedro Marrero, Havana
Attendance: 100
Referee: Howard Stennett (Jamaica)
4 September 2006

Cuba	6–0	Bahamas
Alcántara 22', 50', 63'; Colomé 30' (pen.); Ocaña 40'; Martínez 42'

Estadio Pedro Marrero, Havana
Attendance: 100
Referee: Peter Prendergast (Jamaica)

6 September 2006

Turks and Caicos Islands	2–3	Bahamas
Glinton 51', 72'		Nassies 59'; Hall 63'; Jean 87'

Estadio Pedro Marrero, Havana
Attendance: 120
Referee: Courtney Campbell (Jamaica)
6 September 2006

Cuba	7–0	Cayman Islands
Alcántara 6'; Ocaña 10', 34'; Martinez 44', 57'; Colomé 80'; Muñoz 83'

Estadio Pedro Marrero, Havana
Attendance: 120
Referee: Victor Stewart (Jamaica)

=== Group F ===
Played in Guadeloupe at Stade René Serge Nabajoth.

Team	Pld	W	D	L	GF	GA	GD	Pts
Guadeloupe	3	3	0	0	6	0	+6	9
Martinique	3	2	0	1	5	4	+1	6
Saint-Martin	3	0	1	2	0	2	−2	1
Dominica	3	0	1	2	0	5	−5	1

20 September 2006

Guadeloupe	1–0	Saint-Martin
Lambourde 75'

Stade René Serge Nabajoth, Pointe-à-Pitre
Attendance: 1500
Referee: Martin Charles (Dominica)
20 September 2006

Dominica	0–4	Martinique
		Meslien 23' (pen.); Du Fornier 43'; Sourava 63'; Saint Louis 85'

Stade René Serge Nabajoth, Pointe-à-Pitre
Attendance: 1000
Referee: Francis Fanus (Saint Lucia)

22 September 2006

Martinique	1–0	Saint-Martin
Vaton 18'

Stade René Serge Nabajoth, Pointe-à-Pitre
Attendance: 1200
Referee: Gilles Arthur (Saint Lucia)
22 September 2006

Guadeloupe	1–0	Dominica
Mocka 88'

Stade René Serge Nabajoth, Pointe-à-Pitre
Attendance: 1100
Referee: Brian Willet (Antigua and Barbuda)

24 September 2006

Dominica	0–0	Saint-Martin

Stade René Serge Nabajoth, Pointe-à-Pitre
Attendance: 500
Referee: Brian Willet (Antigua and Barbuda)
24 September 2006

Guadeloupe	4–0	Martinique
Gotin 27', 60'; Vertot 54'; Mocka 80'

Stade René Serge Nabajoth, Pointe-à-Pitre
Attendance: 2500
Referee: Charles Martin (Dominica)

== Second qualifying round ==
The top two teams from each first-stage group qualified for the second stage of the competition. Those teams were split into three groups of four teams, called Groups G, H and I. The top two teams in each of these three groups qualified for the finals with Trinidad and Tobago, making seven teams. The best third-place team from Groups G, H, and I qualified as the eighth team in the final competition. This was to have been determined by a single round-robin playoff between the three teams, to be called Group J; however, when Dominican Republic withdrew, the remaining two teams played a two-game series for the right to move on.

=== Summary ===
All three groups went largely to form. It was a wonderful round for host teams, with all three advancing and two winning their group. Host Barbados advanced easily out of Group G, only a tie with Bermuda marring their group performance. They were accompanied by St. Vincent and the Grenadines. Guyana proved perfect as hosts of Group H, and Guadeloupe also did well enough to advance. Finally, Cuba and host Martinique smashed the other two teams in Group I to move forward, with Cuba winning the group based on goal differential. The third-place teams (Bermuda, Dominican Republic, and Haiti) were to have been drawn together in Group J. However, Dominican Republic withdrew, leaving Bermuda and Haiti to contest a two-game set. After achieving a 2–0 win in the first match, Haiti were overwhelming favourites in the second match. With Haiti leading by two goals in stoppage time of the second half, a thrilling goal by Éliphène Cadet (to add to his goal in the first match) gave Haiti a 3–0 victory, a 5–0 aggregate win, and with it the final spot in the final stage.

=== Group G ===
Played in Barbados at Barbados National Stadium.

Team	Pld	W	D	L	GF	GA	GD	Pts
Barbados	3	2	1	0	6	2	+4	7
Saint Vincent and the Grenadines	3	2	0	1	6	5	+1	6
Bermuda	3	1	1	1	5	4	+1	4
Bahamas	3	0	0	3	3	9	−6	0

19 November 2006

Bermuda	0–3	Saint Vincent and the Grenadines
		M. James 58'; Samuel 68', 77'

Barbados National Stadium, Bridgetown
19 November 2006

Barbados	2–1	Bahamas
Forde 38'; Skinner 44'		Jean 76' (pen.)

Barbados National Stadium, Bridgetown

21 November 2006

Bahamas	0–4	Bermuda
		Smith 6', 28'; Nusum 11'; Steede 87'

Barbados National Stadium, Bridgetown
21 November 2006

Barbados	3–0	Saint Vincent and the Grenadines
D. James 16'; Forde 34'; Ifill 60'

Barbados National Stadium, Bridgetown

23 November 2006

Bahamas	2–3	Saint Vincent and the Grenadines
Christie 55'; Moseley 65'		Samuel 56', 61'; Charles 80'

Barbados National Stadium, Bridgetown
23 November 2006

Barbados	1–1	Bermuda
Ifill 4'		Nusum 42'

Barbados National Stadium, Bridgetown

=== Group H ===
Played in Guyana at Bourda Cricket Ground.

Team	Pld	W	D	L	GF	GA	GD	Pts
Guyana	3	3	0	0	13	2	+11	9
Guadeloupe	3	2	0	1	8	4	+4	6
Dominican Republic	3	1	0	2	2	7	−5	3
Antigua and Barbuda	3	0	0	3	1	11	−10	0

24 November 2006

Dominican Republic	0–3	Guadeloupe
		Angloma 85'; Mocka 88'; Phaan 90'

Bourda Cricket Ground, Georgetown
Attendance: 5,000
24 November 2006

Guyana	6–0	Antigua and Barbuda
Richardson 3', 12'; Jerome 35', 54'; Codrington 75'; McKinnon 76'

Bourda Cricket Ground, Georgetown
Attendance: 5,000

26 November 2006

Dominican Republic	2–0	Antigua and Barbuda
Severino 70' (pen.); Batista 81'

Bourda Cricket Ground, Georgetown
Attendance: 5,000
26 November 2006

Guyana	3–2	Guadeloupe
Codrington 22', 68'; Richardson 25'		Mocka 60', 86'

Bourda Cricket Ground, Georgetown
Attendance: 5,000

28 November 2006

Antigua and Barbuda	1–3	Guadeloupe
Gregory 45'		Gavarin 1', 72'; Lambourde 31'

Bourda Cricket Ground, Georgetown
Attendance: 4,000
28 November 2006

Guyana	4–0	Dominican Republic
Richardson 45'; Jerome 50'; Codrington 57' (pen.); Hercules 80'

Bourda Cricket Ground, Georgetown
Attendance: 4,000

=== Group I ===
Played in Martinique at Stade d'Honneur de Dillon.

Team	Pld	W	D	L	GF	GA	GD	Pts
Cuba	3	2	1	0	5	2	+3	7
Martinique	3	2	1	0	2	0	+2	7
Haiti	3	0	1	2	2	4	−2	1
Suriname	3	0	1	2	2	5	−3	1

8 November 2006

Haiti	1–2	Cuba
Fritzson 87'		Márquez 20'; More 77'

Stade d'Honneur de Dillon, Fort-de-France
Attendance: 2,500
Referee: Victor Stewart (Jamaica)
8 November 2006

Martinique	1–0	Suriname
Audel 61'

Stade d'Honneur de Dillon, Fort-de-France
Attendance: 2,500
Referee: Royon Small (Barbados)

10 November 2006

Cuba	3–1	Suriname
Álvarez 4', 27'; Colomé 40' (pen.)		Aroepa 90'

Stade d'Honneur de Dillon, Fort-de-France
Attendance: 3,200
Referee: Howard Stennett (Jamaica)
10 November 2006

Martinique	1–0	Haiti
Bullet 3'

Stade d'Honneur de Dillon, Fort-de-France
Attendance: 3,200
Referee: Timothy H. Wood (St. Vin. & the Gren.)

12 November 2006

Haiti	1–1	Suriname
Jean-Jacques 78' (pen.)		Sastromedjo 75'

Stade d'Honneur de Dillon, Fort-de-France
12 November 2006

Martinique	0–0	Cuba

Stade d'Honneur de Dillon, Fort-de-France

=== Group J ===
With the withdrawal of Dominican Republic, Haiti and Bermuda played each other twice. Haiti, as the winner of the series, advanced to the finals. The matches were played at the Ato Boldon Stadium in Trinidad and Tobago.

7 January 2007

Haiti	2–0	Bermuda
Cadet 9'; Lormera 72'

Ato Boldon Stadium, Couva
9 January 2007

Bermuda	0–3	Haiti
		Cadet 25', 90+2'; Boucicaut 63'

Ato Boldon Stadium, Couva

== Final tournament ==
=== First round ===
Trinidad and Tobago qualified as host. Barbados and Saint Vincent and the Grenadines qualified from Group G. Guyana and Guadeloupe qualified from Group H. Cuba and Martinique qualified from Group I. Haiti qualified from the Playoff.

The groups were named after two former Trinidad and Tobago players.

=== Sedley Joseph Group ===
Hasely Crawford Stadium, Port of Spain, Trinidad and Tobago

Team	Pld	W	D	L	GF	GA	GD	Pts
Trinidad and Tobago	3	2	1	0	9	3	+6	7
Haiti	3	2	0	1	4	3	+1	6
Martinique	3	1	0	2	4	8	−4	3
Barbados	3	0	1	2	3	6	−3	1

12 January 2007

Trinidad and Tobago	1–1	Barbados
Glasgow 31'		Harvey 66'

Hasely Crawford Stadium, Port of Spain
Attendance: 8,000
12 January 2007

Haiti	1–0	Martinique
Fucien 12'

Hasely Crawford Stadium, Port of Spain
Attendance: 8,000
Referee: Courtney Campbell (Jamaica)

15 January 2007

Haiti	2–0	Barbados
Boucicaut 54'; Lomera 90+1'

Hasely Crawford Stadium, Port of Spain
15 January 2007

Trinidad and Tobago	5–1	Martinique
Roberts 3'; Baptiste 36', 75' (pen.); Glasgow 47', 83'		Bullet 16'

Hasely Crawford Stadium, Port of Spain

17 January 2007

Barbados	2–3	Martinique
Harvey 27'; Soares 42'		Percin 8'; Clementia 19'; Germany 32'

Hasely Crawford Stadium, Port of Spain
Attendance: 8,500
Referee: Javier Jauregua (Netherlands Antilles)
17 January 2007

Trinidad and Tobago	3–1	Haiti
Jemmott 14'; Glasgow 66', 85'		Fucien 54'

Hasely Crawford Stadium, Port of Spain
Attendance: 8,500
Referee: Courtney Campbell (Jamaica)

=== Tavindra Sookram Group ===
Manny Ramjohn Stadium, Marabella, Trinidad and Tobago

Team	Pld	W	D	L	GF	GA	GD	Pts
Guadeloupe	3	2	0	1	6	5	+1	6
Cuba	3	1	1	1	4	2	+2	4
Guyana	3	1	1	1	4	5	−1	4
Saint Vincent and the Grenadines	3	1	0	2	2	4	−2	3

14 January 2007

Cuba	1–2	Guadeloupe
Alonso 68'		Bizasène 29'; Angloma 85'

Manny Ramjohn Stadium, Marabella
14 January 2007

Guyana	0–2	Saint Vincent and the Grenadines
		Samuel 4'; Glynn 86'

Manny Ramjohn Stadium, Marabella

16 January 2007

Guadeloupe	3–4	Guyana
Loizeau 45+2'; Lambourde 54'; Raddas 87' (pen.)		Codrington 23' (pen.), 59' (pen.), 81'; Lowe 65'

Manny Ramjohn Stadium, Marabella
16 January 2007

Cuba	3–0	Saint Vincent and the Grenadines
More 26', 58'; Duarte 89'

Manny Ramjohn Stadium, Marabella

18 January 2007

Cuba	0–0	Guyana

Manny Ramjohn Stadium, Marabella
18 January 2007

Saint Vincent and the Grenadines	0–1	Guadeloupe
		Mocka 14'

Manny Ramjohn Stadium, Marabella

=== Semi finals ===
20 January 2007

Guadeloupe	1–3	Haiti
Lambourde 83'		Cadet 56'; Fucien 66'; Fritzson 76'

Hasely Crawford Stadium, Port of Spain
Referee: Roberto Moreno (Panama)
20 January 2007

Trinidad and Tobago	3–1	Cuba
Molina 41' (o.g.); Glasgow 57'; Theobald 73'		Duarte 76'

Hasely Crawford Stadium, Port of Spain

=== Third Place Playoff ===
23 January 2007

Cuba	2–1	Guadeloupe
Cervantes 24', 48'		Raddas 52'

Hasely Crawford Stadium, Port of Spain
Referee: Neal Brizan (Trinidad and Tobago)

=== Final ===
23 January 2007

Trinidad and Tobago	1–2	Haiti
Daniel 66'		Boucicaut 23'; Fucien 52'

Hasely Crawford Stadium, Port of Spain
Referee: Roberto Moreno (Panama)

== Result ==
2007 Caribbean Cup winner

Haiti
First title

== Qualifiers for the 2007 CONCACAF Gold Cup ==
- Haiti
- Trinidad and Tobago
- Cuba
- Guadeloupe

== Top scorers ==
Name		Goals
1.	(Guyana) Nigel Codrington	11
2.	(Saint Vincent and the Grenadines) Shandel Samuel	10
3.	(Cuba) Reinier Alcántara	7
4.	(Barbados) Paul Ifill	6
	(Guadeloupe) Dominique Mocka	6
	(Trinidad and Tobago) Gary Glasgow	6
7.	(Guyana) Gregory Richardson	5
	(Dominican Republic) Jonathan Faña	5
	(Guyana) Randolph Jerome	5
