= Cedrick =

Cédrick or Cedrick is a given name. Notable people with the name include:

- Cedrick "CJ" Bailey, American football player
- Cedrick Banks (born 1981), American professional basketball player
- Cedrick Bowers (born 1978), left-handed Major League Baseball pitcher
- Cédrick Desjardins (born 1985), Canadian professional ice hockey goaltender
- Cédrick Fiston (born 1981), French-Guadeloupean footballer who plays striker
- Cedrick Hardman (born 1948), former American Football defensive end
- Cedrick Kalombo Lukanda (born 1983), South African basketball player
- Cedrick Mabwati (born 1992), Congolese football player
- Cédrick Ramos (born 1983), French professional football player
- Cedrick Wilson Sr. (born 1978), American football wide receiver
- Cedrick Wilson Jr. (born 1995), son of the above and American football wide receiver
