= Cameron Hepple =

Bahamian footballer

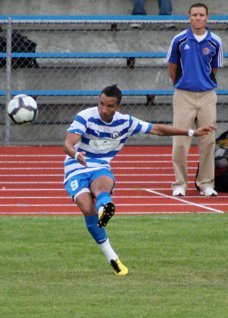
- Hepple taking a freekick for the Pumas

Personal information
- Full name: Cameron Robert Hepple
- Date of birth: 19 May 1988 (age 38)
- Place of birth: Nassau, Bahamas
- Height: 5 ft 9 in (1.75 m)
- Positions: Attacking midfielder; forward

Team information
- Current team: Alcobendas Sport

Youth career
- 2004–2006: Bears

College career
Years	Team	Apps	(Gls)
2006–2009	Bowling Green Falcons		

Senior career*
Years	Team	Apps	(Gls)
2009	Bradenton Academics	14	(2)
2010–2011	Kitsap Pumas	22	(7)
2011–2012	KF Tirana	7	(0)
2013	Alcobendas Sport		
2013–	Lyford Cay		

International career^{‡}
- Bahamas U17
- Bahamas U20
2004–	Bahamas	13	(1)
- * Club domestic league appearances and goals as of 29 December 2011 ‡ National team caps and goals as of 2 July 2011

Cameron Robert Hepple (born 19 May 1988) is a Bahamian footballer who plays for Lyford Cay.

== Early career ==
=== Youth, amateur and college ===
At 9 years old Hepple was selected for the first Centre of Excellence program created for The Bahamas by English coach Gary White.

After impressing at the U-17 World Cup Qualifiers in Cuba, Hepple was scouted to go on trials in England with fellow Bahamian International Demont Mitchell.

Hepple had trials with Southampton and Wolverhampton Wanderers in England, before going on to play domestically for Bears FC in the Bahamian New Providence Football League at 13 years of age.

Hepple left The Bahamas to play college soccer in the United States in 2005, eventually settling at Bowling Green State University. During his time there he was named to the MAC 2nd team in 2007 and also in 2009.

== Club career ==
Following his graduation from Bowling Green State University, Hepple signed a two-year contract to play for the Kitsap Pumas of the Premier Development League in April 2010.

=== Kitsap Pumas ===
In his first season with the Pumas Hepple was a regular in the side contributing eight goals and seven assists for the season gaining the honours of Western Conference Team for 2010. The Pumas also qualified for the US Open Cup after winning the first five matches of the season, however they lost in the second round to the Portland Timbers. The Kitsap Pumas ended the season second in the league behind the Portland Timbers U23's, and then went on to lose 2–1 in the play off finals to the Portland Timbers U23's, who continued their success to become the 2010 PDL Champions.

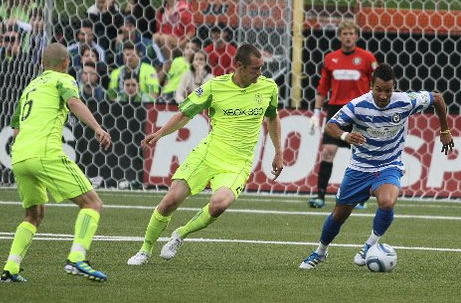
US Open Cup Kitsap Pumas vs Seattle Sounders

During his second season at the Pumas Hepple was again a regular in the side playing a part in the clubs undefeated run for the 2011 season and also the US Open Cup competition. Hepple went on to score against the Real Colorado Foxes in the second round of the US Open Cup, pushing the Pumas to the third round of the competition to face the 2010 US Open Cup Champions the Seattle Sounders FC. On 29 June 2011, the Pumas faced the Seattle Sounders in the third round of the US Open Cup Competition at Starfire Sports Complex in Tukwila, Washington, the Pumas lost 2–1 to the Sounders.

The next day Hepple was on a flight to The Bahamas representing his country in the 2014 FIFA World Cup Qualifications on 2 July 2011 against Turks and Caicos Islands at the TCIFA National Academy in Providenciales, Turks and Caicos. The Bahamas won the match 4–0, with Hepple tallying an assist to Nesley Jean and a goal.

During the month of June the Bahamian attacker had been receiving various enquires from clubs including some from Europe where Hepple would be able to utilise his British citizenship and would not be affected by non-EU quotas and restrictions. After discussing his options with his family, he and his club ultimately decided to sign a deal with the Albanian club KF Tirana the biggest team in the Albanian Superliga. Before signing for Tirana, Hepple also trialed with Varese of Serie B but was not offered a contract.

=== KF Tirana ===
On 5 July 2011, Hepple was sold by the Pumas to KF Tirana of the Albanian Superliga. He arrived in Albania just one day before KF Tirana's UEFA Europa League encounter with Slovak side Spartak Trnava, following a 32-hour trip from The Bahamas to Tirana. He arrived in Tirane in the early hours of Wednesday morning and managed to attend training the same day after just a few hours sleep, where he went on to impress the manager Julián Rubio enough to offer him a place in the starting line-up for the game the very next day.

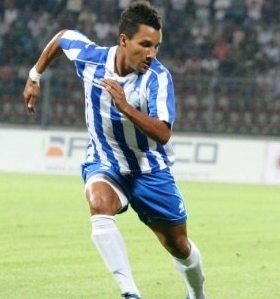
KF Tirana against Skënderbeu Korçë in the 2011 Albanian Supercup

On 14 July 2011, he became the first Bahamian to play in the Europa League, when KF Tirana played Spartak Trnava in the 2011–12 UEFA Europa League Second Qualifying Round, KF Tirana tied 0–0 in the first leg and lost in the second leg 3–1 in Trnava on 21 July.

Hepple then played in the Albanian Supercup match on 18 August 2011 against the 2010–11 Superliga champions Skënderbeu Korçë played at Skënderbeu Stadium. The match was postponed 50 minutes due to the KF Tirana supporters being denied access to the stadium, KF Tirana refused to play until their fans were allowed into the stadium. Once the away supporters were allowed to enter the stadium the game then commenced for only 10 minutes before flares were thrown onto the pitch by the entering supporters, thus creating a riot between the fans resulting in the expulsion of the KF Tirana supporters. Riots then broke out on the pitch where fans for the home team Skënderbeu began entering the pitch and throwing rocks at the KF Tirana players forcing them to retreat to their locker room for safety. After crowd settled with police intervention, the match then restarted, KF Tirana won the match 1–0, becoming the first trophy Hepple has won since the start of his professional career.

=== Farnborough ===
On 22 March 2012, Hepple signed a contract until the end of the 2012 season with Farnborough of the Conference South division in the English football league system pending international clearance.

Hepple was unable to receive international clearance due to previous club KF Tirana withholding on his ITC due to a FIFA claim against the club in January.

=== Alcobendas Sport ===
On 31 January 2013, Hepple signed a contract with Madrid-based side Alcobendas Sport of the Tercera Division group 7 until the end of the 2013 season. In January and March 2013, Hepple had trials with Queens Park Rangers and Watford, both of high levels in the English football league system, but was not offered a contract despite an early interest from the latter. At the end of the season, Hepple left the club and had trials with clubs from Japan's J. League Division 2. Hepple decided to wait until the January transfer window before deciding on his next club after earning interest from clubs while in Japan. Hepple also expressed interest in Major League Soccer clubs, especially Toronto FC, because he holds a Canadian passport. He had previously generated interest from clubs in Major League Soccer in 2010, at which time he trialed with Seattle Sounders FC and Colorado Rapids.

== International ==
Hepple is a full international for the Bahamas national football team. He played for The Bahamas U-17 and U-23 teams before making his senior debut in a World Cup qualification match against Dominica in March 2004, when just 15 years old. Hepple has since earned 13 caps, 8 of those in World Cup qualification games. He scored his first goal for The Bahamas in a 4–0 rout of Turks and Caicos in a 2014 qualification game.

=== International Goals ===
Scores and results list The Bahamas's goal tally first.

No.	Date	Venue	Opponent	Score	Result	Competition
1.	2 July 2011	TCIFA National Academy, Providenciales, Turks and Caicos	Turks and Caicos Islands	2–0	4–0	2014 FIFA World Cup qualification
2.	9 September 2019	Thomas Robinson Stadium, Nassau, The Bahamas	Bonaire	1–0	2–1	2019–20 CONCACAF Nations League C

== Personal life ==
Hepple has a British father. He also holds a Canadian passport. After returning to the Bahamas, he started his own travel company and now works as a sales agent for a real estate company where former Bahamian international Gavin Christie is managing partner. He also coaches at Lyford Cay.
