= Randy Rogers (football manager) =

Bahamian professional football manager

Personal information
- Place of birth: Bahamas

Managerial career
- Years: Team
- 1987-1998: Bahamas

Randy Rogers is a Bahamian professional football manager.

== Career ==
In 1987, he coached the Bahamas national football team.
