= Jean-Baptiste Fritzson =

Haitian footballer (born 1986)

Personal information
- Full name: Jean-Baptiste Fritzson
- Date of birth: January 4, 1986 (age 40)
- Place of birth: Delmas, Haiti
- Position: Striker

Team information
- Current team: Morris Elite SC

Youth career
- 2005–2006: Aigle Noir AC

College career
Years	Team	Apps	(Gls)
2011–2012	Essex County Wolverines	6	(9)

Senior career*
Years	Team	Apps	(Gls)
2006–2011	Aigle Noir AC	78	(12)
2014–2017	Icon FC		
2017–2019	Lansdowne Yonkers FC		
2021–	Morris Elite SC	0	(0)

International career^{‡}
2005–2006	Haiti U20	7	(1)
2006–2010	Haiti U23	3	(1)
2008	Haiti	26	(8)
- * Club domestic league appearances and goals as of 18 June 2021 ‡ National team caps and goals as of 03 March 2021

Jean-Baptiste Fritzson (born 4 January 1986) is a Haitian footballer who plays as a striker for Morris Elite SC.

== Career ==
Born in Delmas, Haiti, Jean-Baptiste Fritzson started his career with the youth setup of local club Aigle Noir AC. After several years with the first team of Aigle Noir AC in January 2009 he went on trial at Montreal Impact and New York Red Bulls.

On 17 May 2010, the New England Revolution of Major League Soccer announced that Fritzson would join the team on trial. He started for the team in a friendly match against Benfica on 18 May.

For the 2011 season Fritzon played college soccer for Essex County College. In his one year with the Wolverines he appeared in 6 matches scoring 9 goals and providing 2 assists.

On 22 September 2020, it was announced that Fritzon would be joining Morris Elite SC for the clubs inaugural season in USL 2.

== International ==
Fitzson is a former Haitian under-21 international, having appeared in seven games and scoring one goal at that level. In 2006 he played his first match with the senior national team. He also played with his country the under-23 qualification matches for the Beijing Olympic Games.

== Honours ==
Haiti

- Caribbean Cup: 2007
