= IMG Academy Bradenton =

Association football team in Florida, US

- Full name: IMG Academy Bradenton
- Nickname: The Academics
- Founded: 1998; 28 years ago (as Bradenton Academics)
- Stadium: IMG Academy; Bradenton, Florida
- Capacity: 1,500
- League: USL League Two
- 2018: 4th, Southeast Division; Playoffs: DNQ
- Website: www.imgacademy.com/boarding-school/athletics/soccer-girls
Home colors	Away colors

IMG Academy Bradenton is an American soccer team based in Bradenton, Florida, United States. Founded in 1998, the team plays in USL League Two, the fourth tier of the American Soccer Pyramid.

The team is associated with IMG Academy and the United States Soccer Federation's full-time residency program for the US Under 17 Men's National Team. The team plays its home games in the stadium at IMG Academy, where they have played since 2003. The team's colors are blue, gold and black.

From 2004 to 2008 the team had a sister organization, the Bradenton Athletics, who played in the women's W-League.

== Players ==
=== Current roster ===
As of June 23, 2014.

Note: Flags indicate national team as defined under FIFA eligibility rules; some limited exceptions apply. Players may hold more than one non-FIFA nationality.

No.	Pos.	Nation	Player
0	GK	USA	Connor Sparrow
1	GK	USA	Marco Velez
1	GK	USA	Robert Shearer
2	DF	ENG	Jamie McGuinness
3	DF	USA	David Abidor
4	DF	USA	Joseph Hutchinson
4	DF	USA	Konroad Kucharski
5	DF	USA	Mathew Gardner
6	MF	USA	Myles Englis
7	FW	NGA	Yussuf Olajide
8	MF	HUN	Alejandro Fritz Ruenes
8	MF	CRC	Daniel Valenciano
9	MF	USA	Raul Gonzalez
9	FW	JAM	Christopher Campbell
10	MF	USA	Douglas Goodman

No.	Pos.	Nation	Player
11	FW	BAH	Terry Delancy
12	DF	JAM	Theodore Brown
12	DF	USA	Jason Chapman
13	MF	USA	Matias Rubio
14	DF	USA	Eric DeJulio
15	DF	USA	Daniel Barboto
15	DF	CRC	Mario Mesen
16	FW	USA	Oliver Harvey
17	FW	BER	Casey Castle
17	DF	POR	Nuno Gourgel
18	MF	FRA	William Suedois
19	DF	USA	Isaiah Fergusson
—	MF	USA	Jesus Pineda
—		USA	Brendan O'Connor

=== Notable former players ===
This list of notable former players comprises players who went on to play professional soccer after playing for the team in the Premier Development League, or those who previously played professionally before joining the team.

- (United States) David Abidor
- (Thailand) Anthony Ampaipitakwong
- (Venezuela) Bernardo Anor
- (United States) Jeff Attinella
- (United States) Zak Boggs
- (United States) Kevin Burns
- (United States) Jonny Campbell
- (New Zealand) Francis de Vries
- (England) Ben Everson
- (Czech Republic) Jani Galik
- (United States) Blair Gavin
- (United States) Michael Gavin
- (United States) Miguel Gonzalez
- (The Bahamas) Happy Hall
- (The Bahamas) Cameron Hepple
- (United States) Stephen Keel
- (United States) Wes Knight
- (United States) Nick Kolarac
- (United States) David Mahoney
- (United States) Devon McKenney
- (Haiti) Pascal Millien
- (Honduras) Steven Morris
- (Costa Rica) Kurt Morsink
- (United States) Nick Noble
- (United States) Michael Parkhurst
- (United States) Heath Pearce
- (United States) Charlie Reiter
- (United States) Brad Rusin
- (United States) Jordan Seabrook
- (United States) Yevgeni Starikov
- (Jamaica) Ryan Thompson
- (United States) Tanner Wolfe
- (United States) Andrew Wolverton
- (United States) Leland Wright

== Year-by-year ==
Year	Division	League	Regular season	Playoffs	Open Cup
1998	4	USISL PDSL	3rd, Southeast	Division Semifinals	did not qualify
1999	4	USL PDL	5th, Southeast	did not qualify	did not qualify
2000	4	USL PDL	2nd, Southeast	Conference Semifinals	did not qualify
2001	4	USL PDL	3rd, Southeast	did not qualify	did not qualify
2002	4	USL PDL	2nd, Southeast	National Semifinals	did not qualify
2003	4	USL PDL	3rd, Southeast	did not qualify	2nd Round
2004	4	USL PDL	4th, Southeast	did not qualify	did not qualify
2005	4	USL PDL	3rd, Southeast	did not qualify	did not qualify
2006	4	USL PDL	1st, Southeast	Conference Finals	did not qualify
2007	4	USL PDL	4th, Southeast	did not qualify	did not qualify
2008	4	USL PDL	2nd, Southeast	Conference Semifinals	1st Round
2009	4	USL PDL	2nd, Southeast	National Semifinals	did not qualify
2010	4	USL PDL	6th, Southeast	did not qualify	did not qualify
2011	4	USL PDL	3rd, Southeast	did not qualify	did not qualify
2012	4	USL PDL	3rd, Southeast	did not qualify	did not qualify
2013	4	USL PDL	6th, Southeast	did not qualify	did not qualify
2014	4	USL PDL	3rd, Southeast	did not qualify	did not qualify
2015	4	USL PDL	5th, Southeast	did not qualify	did not qualify
2016	4	USL PDL	6th, Southeast	did not qualify	did not qualify
2017	4	USL PDL	5th, Southeast	did not qualify	did not qualify
2018	4	USL PDL	4th, Southeast	did not qualify	did not qualify

== Honors ==
- USL PDL Southern Conference Champions 2009
- USL PDL Southeast Division Champions 2006
- USL PDL Southern Conference Champions 2002

== Head coaches ==
- (United States) Tom Durkin (2005–2011)

== Stadia ==
- IMG Soccer Academy; Bradenton, Florida (2003–present)

== Average attendance ==
Attendance stats are calculated by averaging each team's self-reported home attendances from the historical match archive at https://web.archive.org/web/20100105175057/http://www.uslsoccer.com/history/index_E.html and Kenn.com.

Bradenton Academics

- 1998: 62 (21st in PDSL)
- 1999: 69 (29th in PDL)
- 2000: 87 (26th in PDL) Playoffs: NA
- 2001: 112 (36th in PDL)
- 2002: 95 (42nd in PDL) Playoffs: NA
- 2003: 129 43rd in PDL)
- 2004: 78 (54th in PDL)
- 2005: 97 (50th in PDL)
- 2006: 103 (57th in PDL)
- 2007: 135 (57th in PDL)
- 2008: 138 (59th in PDL)
- 2009: 146 (56th in PDL)
- 2010: 103 (61st in PDL)

IMG Bradenton Academics

- 2011: 178 (48th in PDL)
- 2012: 95 (66th in PDL)

IMG Academy Bradenton

- 2013: 27 (63rd in PDL)
- 2014: 106 (56th in PDL)
- 2015: NA
- 2016: NA
- 2017: NA
- 2018: NA
