= Happy Hall =

Bahamian footballer

Personal information
- Full name: Happy McNair Hall
- Date of birth: October 15, 1987 (age 39)
- Place of birth: Nassau, Bahamas
- Height: 5 ft 10 in (1.78 m)
- Position: Defender

Team information
- Current team: Lyford Cay

College career
Years	Team	Apps	(Gls)
2005–2006	Appalachian State Mountaineers		

Senior career*
Years	Team	Apps	(Gls)
2005	Bradenton Academics	5	(1)
2007	Bradenton Academics	4	(0)
2008	North York Astros	12	(0)
2009	Gosport Borough	5	(0)
2009	Bradenton Academics	13	(2)
2009–2010	Ma Pau SC	12	(0)
2011	Dayton Dutch Lions	19	(1)
2014–	Lyford Cay		

International career^{‡}
- Bahamas U20
- Bahamas U23
2006–	Bahamas	15	(3)
- * Club domestic league appearances and goals as of September 16, 2011 ‡ National team caps and goals as of 20:29, 25 October 2019 (UTC)

Happy McNair Hall (born October 15, 1987) is a Bahamian international footballer who plays for local side Lyford Cay as a defender.

== Career ==
=== College and amateur ===
Born in Nassau, Hall played college soccer at Appalachian State University, and had three stints with the Bradenton Academics in the USL Premier Development League in 2005, 2007 and 2009.

=== Professional ===
Upon graduating, Hall had a trial with Romanian outfit Ceahlăul Piatra Neamț in February 2008 and briefly played with North York Astros in the Canadian Soccer League in 2008, before joining English side Gosport Borough in February 2009, on a deal until the end of the 2008–09 season.

Following the conclusion of the English football season, Hall returned to North America, and signed to play a third stint for Bradenton Academics in 2009, alongside his national teammate Cameron Hepple. Towards the end of the 2009 PDL season Hall went on trials and secured a deal with Ma Pau SC in the TT Pro League in Trinidad and Tobago.

On March 7, 2011, Hall signed a two-year contract with Dayton Dutch Lions of the American USL Pro league.

=== International ===
Hall made his debut for the Bahamas in a September 2006 Caribbean Cup qualification match against the Cayman Islands. He had earned 10 caps by November 2008, four of them in World Cup qualification games. Hall captained the side in the 2010 World Cup qualification matches.

=== International goals ===
Scores and results list the Bahamas' goal tally first.

No.	Date	Venue	Opponent	Score	Result	Competition
1.	6 September 2006	Estadio Pedro Marrero, Havana, Cuba	Turks and Caicos Islands	2–1	3–2	2007 Caribbean Cup qualification
2.	9 September 2019	Thomas Robinson Stadium, Nassau, Bahamas	Bonaire	1–0	2–1	2019–20 CONCACAF Nations League C
3.	10 October 2019	Warner Park, Basseterre, Saint Kitts and Nevis	British Virgin Islands	3–0	4–0	2019–20 CONCACAF Nations League C

== Personal life ==
Hall is founder of the YESI Soccer and Skillz Soccer Schools in the Bahamas.
