= Reynaldo Anderson =

Panamanian footballer (born 1986)

Reinaldo Anderson
Personal information
- Full name: Reynaldo Anderson
- Date of birth: April 12, 1986 (age 40)
- Place of birth: Colón, Panama, Panama
- Height: 1.91 m (6 ft 3 in)
- Position: Defender

Team information
- Current team: Independiente La Chorrera
| 2007–2013 | Árabe Unido | 70 | (3) |
| 2009–2010 | → Ramonense (loan) | 15 | (0) |
| 2014 | Sporting San Miguelito | 13 | (1) |

International career^{‡}
| Years | Team | Apps | (Gls) |
| 2007 | Panama | 4 | (0) |
- ‡ National team caps and goals as of 18 June 2009

Reynaldo Anderson Jaen (born 12 April 1986), name also spelled as Reinaldo Anderson, is a Panamanian football defender who currently plays for Liga Panameña de Fútbol side Árabe Unido

== Club career ==
A tall central defender, Anderson played for Atlético Veragüense before moving abroad to play for Brazilian outfit Ipatinga. He returned to Panama in 2007 for a lengthy spell with Árabe Unido. In summer 2009, Anderson joined Costa Rican side Ramonense on a year loan. He left Árabe Unido in January 2014 for Sporting San Miguelito.

He joined Árabe Unido in summer 2004.

== International career ==
Anderson made his debut for Panama in a March 2007 friendly match against Haiti and has earned a total of 5 caps, scoring no goals (including an unofficial, abandoned match against Mexico in September 2007). He was non-playing squad member at the 2007 CONCACAF Gold Cup.

His final international was a September 2007 friendly against Venezuela.

== Honors ==
=== Club ===
- Liga Panameña de Fútbol (1): 2008 (C)
