= Marcel Joseph =

Bahamian footballer (born 1997)

Personal information
- Full name: Marcel Maximi Joseph
- Date of birth: 30 March 1997 (age 29)
- Place of birth: Nassau, Bahamas
- Height: 1.72 m (5 ft 8 in)
- Position: Forward

College career
Years	Team	Apps	(Gls)
2016–2017	Eastern Oklahoma Mountaineers	10	(2)
2017–2018	Southern Wesleyan Warriors	20	(1)
2018	Southern Nazarene Crimson Storm	14	(5)

Senior career*
Years	Team	Apps	(Gls)
2018	Bears FC		
2019	Florida Elite SA	8	(2)
2020	Side 92		
2021–2022	SCU Heat	18	(11)
2023–2024	SoccerViza Talamanca		
2024–2026	CA Oradea	51	(9)
2026	FC London	15	(3)

International career^{‡}
2012	Bahamas U17	1	(0)
2018–	Bahamas	24	(3)
- * Club domestic league appearances and goals as of 14:37, 14 November 2025 (UTC) ‡ National team caps and goals as of 21:30, 12 February 2024 (UTC)

Marcel Joseph (born 30 March 1997) is a Bahamian footballer who plays for the Bahamas national football team, whom he also captains.

== Club career ==
For the 2019 USL League Two season, Joseph signed for Florida Elite Soccer Academy. Over the course of the season, he made eight appearances, scoring two goals. Following the COVID-19 pandemic which saw the 2020 USL League Two season cancelled Joseph signed for Side 92 FC of the United Premier Soccer League, joining fellow-Bahamians Valin Bodie and coach Corie Frazer. Joseph had scored five goals eight games into the season. For the 2021 Fall UPSL season, Joseph joined SCU Heat, based in Columbia, South Carolina.

In 2026, Joseph joined Ontario Premier League team FC London.

== International career ==
Joseph made his senior international debut for the Bahamas on 18 November 2018, playing all ninety minutes in a 1–1 home draw with Anguilla.

=== International goals ===
Scores and results list the Bahamas' goal tally first.

No.	Date	Venue	Opponent	Score	Result	Competition
1.	14 November 2019	Thomas Robinson Stadium, Nassau, Bahamas	British Virgin Islands	1–0	3–0	2019–20 CONCACAF Nations League C
2.	27 March 2023	Arnos Vale Stadium, Arnos Vale, Saint Vincent	Saint Vincent and the Grenadines	1–1	1–1	2022–23 CONCACAF Nations League B
3.	21 November 2023	Juan Ramón Loubriel Stadium, Bayamón, Puerto Rico	Puerto Rico	1–4	1–6	2023–24 CONCACAF Nations League B

=== International statistics ===
As of match played June 5, 2021

National team	Year	Apps	Goals
Bahamas	2018	1	0
Bahamas	2019	5	1
Bahamas	2020	0	0
Bahamas	2021	4	0
Bahamas	2022	4	0
Bahamas	2023	5	2
Bahamas	2024	0	0
Bahamas	2025	2	0
Total		24	3
