= Charlie Reiter =

American soccer player

Personal information
- Full name: Charles Reiter
- Date of birth: February 27, 1988 (age 38)
- Place of birth: New York, New York, United States
- Height: 6 ft 1 in (1.85 m)
- Position: Forward

Team information
- Current team: Pali Blues
- Number: 43

College career
Years	Team	Apps	(Gls)
2006–2009	Davidson Wildcats		

Senior career*
Years	Team	Apps	(Gls)
2006–2007	Bradenton Academics	11	(2)
2010	Richmond Kickers	9	(0)
2012–	Pali Blues	6	(1)
- * Club domestic league appearances and goals as of August 2, 2012

Charles Reiter (born February 27, 1988, in New York, New York) is an American former professional soccer player for the Richmond Kickers in the USL and Pali Blues in the USL Premier Development League.

== Personal life ==
Reiter was born in New York City into a Jewish family. His hometown is Westport, Connecticut.

== Career ==
=== Youth and college ===
Reiter attended IMG in Bradenton, Florida, for his senior year of high school.

In 2007 Reiter also played two seasons with the Bradenton Academics in the USL Premier Development League.

He played college soccer at Davidson College where he was a political science major. In 2009 in college he was ranked sixth nationally in points per game (1.78), eighth in goals per game (0.67) and 29th in assists per game (0.44) He was also voted Southern Conference Player of the Year by the league's coaches, First-team on National Soccer Coaches Association of America (NSCAA) All-South Region team, All-Southern Conference team and North Carolina Collegiate Sports Information Association (NCCSIA) All-State team, and named a CoSIDA/ESPN the Magazine First-Team Academic All-American and a NSCAA/Adidas First-Team Scholar All-American. He played every match in his Davidson career.

During his junior year, he was a member of the US men's squad for the 2009 Maccabiah Games in Israel. A year later Reiter was named to Jewish Sports Review's All-America collegiate team, on a team that included goalkeeper Zac MacMath.

=== Professional ===
Reiter signed with the Kickers on March 10, 2010, after impressing in a trial with the club. Reiter made his professional debut on April 17, 2010, in a league match against Harrisburg City Islanders.

== Career statistics ==
Club performance			League		Cup		League Cup		Continental		Total	
Season	Club	League	Apps	Goals	Apps	Goals	Apps	Goals	Apps	Goals	Apps	Goals
USA			League		Open Cup		League Cup		North America		Total	
2010	Richmond Kickers	USL-2	9	0	0	0	0	0	0	0	9	0
Career total			9	0	0	0	0	0	0	0	9	0

== See also ==
- List of select Jewish football (association; soccer) players
