= Nigel Codrington =

Guyanese footballer

Personal information
- Date of birth: 5 July 1979 (age 47)
- Place of birth: Georgetown, Guyana
- Height: 1.76 m (5 ft 9 in)
- Position: Striker

Youth career
- Camptown Georgetown

Senior career*
Years	Team	Apps	(Gls)
1999–2003	Camptown Georgetown		
2003–2004	Notre Dame SC		
2005	San Juan Jabloteh	16	(7)
2006–2009	Caledonia AIA		
2007	→ Cleveland City Stars (loan)	14	(6)
2009–2012	Camptown Georgetown		

International career^{‡}
2001–2010	Guyana	26	(18)
- * Club domestic league appearances and goals ‡ National team caps and goals as of 24 August 2020

Nigel Codrington (born 5 July 1979) is a Guyanese former footballer whose last club was Camptown Georgetown in the GFF Super League.

== International goals ==
Scores and results list Guyana's goal tally first.

List of international goals scored by Nigel Codrington
No.	Date	Venue	Opponent	Score	Result	Competition
1.	23 March 2001	Georgetown	Barbados	1–0	2–2	Friendly
2.	2 October 2005	Georgetown	Dominica	3–0	3–0	Friendly
3.	24 February 2006	Mackenzie Sports Club Ground, Linden	Antigua and Barbuda	2–0	2–1	Friendly
4.	30 July 2006	Bourda, Georgetown	Saint Lucia	2–0	2–0	Friendly
5.	6 September 2006	Ergilio Hato Stadium, Willemstad	Suriname	2–0	5–0	2007 Caribbean Cup qualifier
6.	6 September 2006	Ergilio Hato Stadium, Willemstad	Suriname	4–0	5–0	2007 Caribbean Cup qualifier
7. (Note: This is miscredited in certain sources as a Gregory Richardson goal.)	8 September 2006	Ergilio Hato Stadium, Willemstad	Netherlands Antilles	1–0	5–0	2007 Caribbean Cup qualifier
8.	8 September 2006	Ergilio Hato Stadium, Willemstad	Netherlands Antilles	2–0	5–0	2007 Caribbean Cup qualifier
9.	23 November 2006	Bourda, Georgetown	Antigua and Barbuda	5–0	6–0	2007 Caribbean Cup qualifier
10.	26 November 2006	Bourda, Georgetown	Guadeloupe	1–0	3–2	2007 Caribbean Cup qualifier
11.	26 November 2006	Bourda, Georgetown	Guadeloupe	3–1	3–2	2007 Caribbean Cup qualifier
12.	28 November 2006	Bourda, Georgetown	Dominican Republic	3–0	4–0	2007 Caribbean Cup qualifier
13.	16 January 2007	Manny Ramjohn Stadium, Marabella	Guadeloupe	1–0	4–3	2007 Caribbean Cup
14.	16 January 2007	Manny Ramjohn Stadium, Marabella	Guadeloupe	2–2	4–3	2007 Caribbean Cup
15.	16 January 2007	Manny Ramjohn Stadium, Marabella	Guadeloupe	4–2	4–3	2007 Caribbean Cup
16.	22 June 2008	Providence Stadium, Providence	Suriname	1–2	1–2	2010 FIFA World Cup qualifier
17.	8 August 2008	Providence Stadium, Providence	Dominica	1–0	3–0	2008 Caribbean Cup qualifier
18.	8 August 2008	Providence Stadium, Providence	Dominica	3–0	3–0	2008 Caribbean Cup qualifier
