= Saúl de Matta =

Guatemalan footballer

Personal information
- Full name: Héctor Saúl de Matta Balán
- Date of birth: April 17, 1980 (age 46)
- Place of birth: Chimaltenango, Guatemala
- Height: 1.65 m (5 ft 5 in)
- Positions: Midfielder; defender

Team information
- Current team: Xelajú

Senior career*
Years	Team	Apps	(Gls)
2004–2010	Comunicaciones	85	(3)
2010–	Xelajú		

International career^{‡}
2006–2007	Guatemala	12	(0)
- * Club domestic league appearances and goals as of 20 February 2007 ‡ National team caps and goals as of 4 April 2010

Héctor Saúl de Matta Balán (born April 17, 1980) is a Guatemalan football midfielder who plays for local club Xelajú in the Guatemala's top division.

== Club career ==
De Matta has been at the Cremas for the large part of his career, making his debut in 2004.

== International career ==
De Matta made his professional debut for Guatemala in an August 2006 friendly match against Haiti and has, as of January 2010, earned a total of 12 caps, scoring no goals. He has represented his country during the 2007 CONCACAF Gold Cup campaign.

He has also played for Guatemala at the 2000 FIFA Futsal World Cup.
