= Neil Harvey (footballer) =

Barbadian footballer

Personal information
- Full name: Neil Anthony Cory Harvey
- Date of birth: 6 August 1983 (age 43)
- Place of birth: Westminster, England
- Height: 1.83 m (6 ft 0 in)
- Position: Striker

Team information
- Current team: Conwy Borough

Senior career*
Years	Team	Apps	(Gls)
2005–2008	Retford United	134	(76)
2008–2009	Macclesfield Town	5	(0)
2009–2010	Retford United	48	(5)
2010–	Marine	80	(31)
2012–2014	Hednesford Town	85	(31)
2014	Marine	2	(1)
2014–2015	Witton Albion		
2015	Cefn Druids	12	(2)
2015	AFC Telford United	0	(0)
2016	Runcorn Town	0	(0)
2016	Widnes	4	(3)
2016–2017	Conwy Borough	11	(5)

International career
2007–2011	Barbados	6	(2)
- * Club domestic league appearances and goals

Neil Anthony Cory Harvey (born 6 August 1983) is an English-born Barbadian footballer who has represented Barbados. Retired

== Club career ==
Harvey joined Retford United in 2005 and played for three seasons. His scoring record in all competitions was an impressive 76 goals in 134 matches, culminating in 35 in 46 in his final season. He was watched by Sheffield United and scored in a trial game for Lincoln City late in the 2007–08 season. But it was Macclesfield Town manager Keith Alexander who secured his signature on 27 June 2008 when he joined the Silkmen on a one-year deal. Harvey had also been tracked by League Two side Morecambe in January 2008. He joined Macclesfield Town in League Two in June 2008. He returned to Retford on loan in 2009, and then returned permanently in July 2009 after being one of the 13 players released by Macclesfield.

On 29 May 2010, it was announced that Neil had signed a contract with Marine. He left the club in May 2012 with Marine reporting that they understood he intended to sign for Hednesford Town. Hednesford announced he had joined the club on 25 May. On 11 May Harvey scored a goal in the 2nd minute of the Evo-Stik Play Off Final inside 2 minutes and Hednesford won the game 2–1 to be promoted to the Conference North. Harvey played 44 games and scored 20 goals in his first season at Keys Park.

Hednesford Town announced on 21 March 2014 that Harvey had left the club by mutual consent and he rejoined Marine.

In July 2014 he joined Witton Albion.

In June 2016 he joined Runcorn Town but left without playing a game to join Widnes. He scored twice on his debut for the club in a 3–1 win over Eccleshall.

In November 2016, Harvey moved to Conwy Borough. He was signed by Brian Pritchard for a third time, having played under Pritchard at both Witton Albion and Widnes.

== International career ==
Harvey made his debut for Barbados in a January 2007 Caribbean Cup match against Trinidad and Tobago in which he immediately scored a goal. He also played in the other two Caribbean Cup matches that month, also scoring against Martinique. He earned his fourth cap in a February 2008 World Cup qualification match against Dominica.

== Career statistics ==
=== International ===
Appearances and goals by national team and year
National team	Year	Apps	Goals
Barbados	2007	3	2
Barbados	2008	1	0
Barbados	2009	–	
Barbados	2010	–	
Barbados	2011	2	0
Total		6	2

Scores and results list Barbados's goal tally first, score column indicates score after each Harvey goal.

List of international goals scored by Neil Harvey
No.	Date	Venue	Opponent	Score	Result	Competition
1	12 January 2007	Hasely Crawford Stadium, Port of Spain, Trinidad and Tobago	Trinidad and Tobago	1–1	1–1	2007 Caribbean Cup
2	17 January 2007	Hasely Crawford Stadium, Port of Spain, Trinidad and Tobago	Martinique	1–2	2–3	2007 Caribbean Cup
