= Leonel Noriega =

Guatemalan footballer

Personal information
- Full name: Leonel Lisandro Noriega Pereira
- Date of birth: 10 May 1975 (age 51)
- Place of birth: Cobán, Guatemala
- Height: 1.76 m (5 ft 9 in)
- Position: Midfielder

Team information
- Current team: Deportivo Marquense

Senior career*
| Years | Team | Apps | (Gls) |
| 2004–2006 | CD Suchitepéquez | 30 | (0) |
| 2006–present | Deportivo Marquense | 24 | (1) |

International career^{‡}
| 2006–2007 | Guatemala | 14 | (0) |
- * Club domestic league appearances and goals as of 28 February 2010 ‡ National team caps and goals as of 28 February 2010

Leonel Noriega (born 10 May 1975 in Cobán), nicknamed "El Cholo", is a Guatemalan football midfielder who currently plays for Deportivo Marquense in the Liga Nacional de Guatemala.

== Club career ==
Noriega, a defensive midfielder, has been playing for Marquense since 2006 after moving from CD Suchitepéquez and signed a year extension of his contract ahead of the 2009/2010 season.

== International career ==
Noriega made his debut for Guatemala in a February 2006 friendly match against the United States and has made 13 appearances for the full Guatemala national football team including three matches at the 2007 CONCACAF Gold Cup He has also represented his country at the UNCAF Nations Cup 2007.
