= Windell Gabriels =

Costa Rican footballer (born 1985)

Personal information
- Full name: Windell Gabriels Valle
- Date of birth: February 1, 1985 (age 41)
- Place of birth: Turrialba, Cartago, Costa Rica
- Height: 1.88 m (6 ft 2 in)
- Positions: Striker; midfielder

Senior career*
Years	Team	Apps	(Gls)
2004–2005	Alajuelense		
2005–2007	Pérez Zeledón	58	(13)
2007–2008	Alajuelense	25	(4)
2007–2009	→ Pérez Zeledón (loan)	9	(2)
2009–2010	Msida Saint-Joseph	3	(0)
2010–2013	UCR		

International career
2007	Costa Rica	5	(0)
- * Club domestic league appearances and goals as of December 17, 2009 (UTC)

Windell Gabriels Valle (born February 1, 1985) is a Costa Rican professional footballer.

== Club career ==
Gabriels started his career at Alajuelense, making his debut against Carmelita before joining Pérez Zeledón in summer 2005. He had a short spell at Msida Saint-Joseph in the Maltese Football League but was released in January 2010. In January 2010, Gabriels joined Universidad.

== International career ==
Gabriels has made five appearances for the senior Costa Rica national football team, his debut coming in a friendly against New Zealand on March 24, 2007. He appeared in three matches for Costa Rica at the 2007 CONCACAF Gold Cup, his final international being their last match at that Gold Cup against Mexico.
