= David Mahoney (soccer) =

American soccer player

Personal information
- Full name: David Mahoney
- Date of birth: April 14, 1981 (age 45)
- Place of birth: Newton, Massachusetts, United States
- Height: 6 ft 2 in (1.88 m)
- Position: Goalkeeper

Youth career
- 2001–02: Brown Bears
- 2003–04: Cornell Big Red

Senior career*
Years	Team	Apps	(Gls)
2003	Bradenton Academics	9	(0)
2004	Cape Cod Crusaders	16	(0)
2005	Western Mass Pioneers	1	(0)
2005–2006	Chicago Fire	3	(0)
2006	→ Seattle Sounders (loan)	5	(0)
- * Club domestic league appearances and goals

David Mahoney (born April 14, 1981) is an American soccer goalkeeper, who formerly played for the Chicago Fire of Major League Soccer.

Mahoney played college soccer at Brown University during the 2001 and 2002 seasons before transferring to Cornell University for 2003 and 2004. During his college years he was prolific in the Premier Development League, playing for Bradenton Academics and Cape Cod Crusaders. In 2005, he played one game for the Western Mass Pioneers.

He began his professional career with the Chicago Fire in 2005 as part of the newly formed MLS Reserve Division. He got his first call up after the two other goalkeepers on the Chicago Fire, Zach Thornton and Matt Pickens became injured. He started 3 games in October with a record of 1-1-1 with a 1.33 GAA, 7 saves and 1 shutout (10/01 @ Kansas City). In 2006, the Fire sent Mahoney on loan with the Seattle Sounders in the USL First Division.

Mahoney was released by the Fire in 2007 when Jon Busch was picked up off waivers.

In June 2014 Mahoney married longtime girlfriend Rachel Buchanan in Chicago.
