= Vicente Melgar =

Salvadoran footballer (born 1982)

Personal information
- Full name: Vicente Januario Melgar Corpeño
- Date of birth: September 6, 1982 (age 44)
- Place of birth: El Salvador
- Height: 1.70 m (5 ft 7 in)
- Position: Midfielder

Senior career*
Years	Team	Apps	(Gls)
2004	C.D. Arcense	11	(0)
2004–2006	Isidro Metapán	51	(1)
2006–2007	Chalatenango	29	(0)
2008	Isidro Metapán	9	(0)
2008–2009	FAS		
2010–2011	Once Lobos		
2012	FAS		

International career
2007	El Salvador	1	(0)
- * Club domestic league appearances and goals

Vicente Januario Melgar Corpeño (born September 6, 1982) is a Salvadoran former footballer who played as a midfielder.

== Club career ==
Melgar was born in El Salvador. He played for several top level sides in El Salvador, most notably for FAS in 2008–09.

In December 2010, he was linked with a return to FAS but it didn't materialise.

== International career ==
Melgar made his debut for El Salvador in a March 2007 friendly match against Honduras and was selected for the El Salvador national team squad for the 2007 CONCACAF Gold Cup finals, but he did not play and has not earned any more caps.
