= Jamil Jean-Jacques =

Haitian footballer (born 1975)

Personal information
- Full name: Jamil Jean-Jacques
- Date of birth: February 10, 1975 (age 51)
- Place of birth: Port-Salut, Haiti
- Height: 5 ft 11 in (1.80 m)
- Position: Defender

Team information
- Current team: Miami FC
- Number: 12

Senior career*
Years	Team	Apps	(Gls)
1998–2005	Racing Club Haïtien		
2006–present	Miami FC	38	(1)

International career^{‡}
2000–present	Haiti	12	(3)
- * Club domestic league appearances and goals as of 14 February 2008 ‡ National team caps and goals as of 14 February 2008

Jamil Jean-Jacques (born February 10, 1975) is a Haitian footballer (defender) playing currently for USL First Division side Miami FC.

== Club career ==
Jean-Jacques started his career at Racing Club Haïtien and only moved abroad to Miami FC at age 31. Jamil currently plays for Palmeiras FC of the Florida Elite Soccer League, FESL.

== International career ==
He made his debut for Haiti in a March 2000 friendly match against El Salvador, only playing 12 games for the country. He did play in the September 2006 CONCACAF Gold Cup qualifying matches. He then was a squad member at the 2007 Gold Cup Finals but only played one game, coming on as a substitute against Canada.

== Honours ==
- Caribbean Nations Cup 2006-07 (1) : 2007
