= Marc Hérold Gracien =

Haitian footballer (born 1983)

Personal information
- Full name: Marc Hérold Gracien
- Date of birth: May 5, 1983 (age 43)
- Place of birth: Saint-Marc, Haiti
- Height: 6 ft 0 in (1.83 m)
- Position: Midfielder

Youth career
- 1997–2002: Paris Saint-Germain

Senior career*
Years	Team	Apps	(Gls)
2002–2003	La Rochelle	24	(9)
2003–2005	Les Lilas	18	(7)
2006–2007	Brive	32	(13)
2008–2009	Plessis-Robinson		
2009	Real Maryland Monarchs	8	(1)

International career
2004–	Haiti	17	(4)
- * Club domestic league appearances and goals as of 12 April 2010

Marc Hérold Gracien (born May 5, 1983) is a Haitian footballer.

== Career ==
At the age of 18 in 2001, Marc-Herold Gracien was considered as the fastest player in France by beating Nicolas Anelka's record after a physical test at Clarefontaine (The National Institute of Soccer)

=== Youth ===
Gracien grew up in France and was part of storied French club Paris Saint-Germain's youth academy, where he played from the age of 14.

=== Professional ===
Gracien began his professional career in France at the age of 18, playing with lower-league sides such as La Rochelle, Les Lilas, Brive and Plessis-Robinson.

Gracien signed with the Real Maryland Monarchs in the USL Second Division in 2009, playing eight games and scoring 1 goal and one assist in his debut season with the team.

SS La Gauloise (Reunion Island Indian Ocean) played 27 games and scored 11 goals. In January 2010, Gracien signed a 2-year contract with the Indian Ocean side. He has a strong strike and he is a great goal scorer.

=== International ===
Gracien made his debut for the Haiti national football team in 2004. He played the qualifying games for the 2006 FIFA World Cup and the 2009 CONCACAF Gold Cup.
