= Kevin Davies (Bahamian footballer) =

Bahamian footballer and manager

Personal information
- Date of birth: 15 May 1967 (age 59)
- Place of birth: Bahamas
- Position: Striker

International career
Years	Team	Apps	(Gls)
1987–2000	Bahamas	6	(2)

Managerial career
- 2011–2014: Bahamas
- 2012–: Bahamas U-17
- 2025–2026: Bahamas

Kevin Davies (born 15 May 1967) is a Bahamian professional football manager and former international player.

== Managerial career ==
From July 2011 to September 2014 he coached the Bahamas national football team.
