= Éliphène Cadet =

Haitian footballer (born 1980)

Personal information
- Date of birth: 10 August 1980 (age 46)
- Position: Forward

Senior career*
Years	Team	Apps	(Gls)
2001–2005	Aigle Noir		
2005–2006	AS Capoise		
2007–2016	Tempête FC		
2017–2018	Port-de-Paix FC		
2018–?	US Pont-Sondé		
2020	Racing CH		

International career
2004–2010	Haiti	42	(13)
- * Club domestic league appearances and goals

Éliphène Cadet (born 10 October 1980) is a Haitian professional footballer who plays as a forward.

== Club career ==
Between 2000 and 2015 Cadet scored more than 70 goals in the Ligue Haïtienne.

Having joined AS Capoise from Aigle Noir, in 2006 he helped the club move up the table and he led the scoring charts at matchday 8.

Cadet hit referee Walner Laventure during a league match between Tempête FC and FICA after being sent off. The sending off was followed by a pitch invasion by fans who beat the game director. Cadet received a ten-match ban.

He joined second-tier club Port-de-Paix FC in April 2017. He moved to league rivals US Pont-Sondé in 2018.

Cadet joined Racing CH in October 2020. He agreed the termination of his contract the following month.

== International career ==
Cadet was in the Haiti national team squad for the 2010 Caribbean Cup.

== Career statistics ==
Appearances and goals by national team and year
National team	Year	Apps	Goals
Haiti	2004	2	2
Haiti	2005	7	4
Haiti	2006	5	1
Haiti	2007	15	6
Haiti	2008	11	0
Haiti	2010	2	0
Total		42	13

Scores and results list Haiti's goal tally first, score column indicates score after each Cadet goal.

List of international goals scored by Éliphène Cadet
No.	Date	Venue	Opponent	Score	Result	Competition
1	12 December 2004	Lockhart Stadium, Fort Lauderdale, United States	Saint Kitts and Nevis	1–0	1–0	2005 Caribbean Cup qualification
2	15 December 2004	Warner Park Sporting Complex, Basseterre, Saint Kitts and Nevis	Saint Kitts and Nevis	1–0	2–0	2005 Caribbean Cup qualification
3	12 January 2005	Estadio Ricardo Saprissa Aymá, San José, Costa Rica	Costa Rica	1–3	3–3	Friendly
4	12 January 2005	Estadio Ricardo Saprissa Aymá, San José, Costa Rica	Costa Rica	2–3	3–3	Friendly
5	16 January 2005	Estadio Pedro Marrero, Havana, Cuba	Cuba	1–0	1–1	2005 Caribbean Cup qualification
6	13 February 2005	Lockhart Stadium, Fort Lauderdale, United States	Guatemala	1–1	1–2	Friendly
7	15 September 2006	Parc Levelt, Saint-Marc, Haiti	Dominican Republic	3–1	3–1	Friendly
8	7 January 2007	Ato Boldon Stadium, Couva, Trinidad and Tobago	Bermuda	1–0	2–0	2007 Caribbean Cup
9	9 January 2007	Ato Boldon Stadium, Couva, Trinidad and Tobago	Bermuda	1–0	3–0	2007 Caribbean Cup
10	9 January 2007	Ato Boldon Stadium, Couva, Trinidad and Tobago	Bermuda	3–0	3–0	2007 Caribbean Cup
11	20 January 2007	Hasely Crawford Stadium, Port of Spain, Trinidad and Tobago	Guadeloupe	1–0	3–1	2007 Caribbean Cup
12	24 March 2007	Miami Orange Bowl, Miami, United States	Panama	1–0	3–0	Friendly
13	19 April 2007	Estadio Nilmo Edwards, La Ceiba, Honduras	Honduras	2–1	3–1	Friendly
