= Nickolson Thomas =

Trinidad and Tobago footballer

Personal information
- Date of birth: 21 March 1982 (age 44)
- Place of birth: Point Fortin, Trinidad and Tobago
- Height: 1.67 m (5 ft 5 1/2 in)
- Position: Defender

Senior career*
| Years | Team | Apps | (Gls) |
| 2004–2011 | W Connection | | |
| 2012–2017 | Point Fortin Civic | | |

International career
| 2003–2008 | Trinidad and Tobago | 6 | (0) |
- * Club domestic league appearances and goals

Nickolson "Ice" Thomas (born 21 March 1982) is a retired Trinidadian football player who played as a right-back.

== Career statistics ==
=== International ===
| National team | Year | Apps | Goals |
|---|---|---|---|
| Trinidad and Tobago | 2003 | 1 | 0 |
| Trinidad and Tobago | 2007 | 4 | 0 |
| Trinidad and Tobago | 2008 | 1 | 0 |
| Total | | 6 | 0 |
