= Cédrik Ramos =

French footballer (born 1983)

Personal information
- Date of birth: 15 February 1983 (age 43)
- Place of birth: Gassin, France
- Height: 1.77 m (5 ft 10 in)
- Position: Midfielder

Youth career
- 2001–2003: Lille

Senior career*
Years	Team	Apps	(Gls)
2003–2007	Saint-Raphaël		
2007	Wilmington Hammerheads	3	(0)
2007–2009	Fréjus	56	(4)
2009–2011	Fréjus St-Raphaël	68	(2)
2011–2012	Orléans	19	(0)
2012–2014	Fréjus St-Raphaël	55	(2)
2014–2015	CA Bastia	15	(0)
2015–2017	Toulon	21	(1)
- * Club domestic league appearances and goals

Cédrik Ramos (born 15 February 1983) is a French former professional footballer who played as a midfielder. He played on the professional level in USL Second Division for Wilmington Hammerheads.
