= Reinier Alcántara =

Cuban footballer (born 1982)

Personal information
- Full name: Reinier Alcántara Nuñez
- Date of birth: January 14, 1982 (age 44)
- Place of birth: Pinar del Río, Cuba
- Height: 5 ft 9 in (1.75 m)
- Position: Forward

Youth career
- Pinar del Río

Senior career*
Years	Team	Apps	(Gls)
1997–2008	Pinar del Río	90	(50)
2009–2010	Miami FC	12	(0)

International career^{‡}
2005–2008	Cuba	18	(10)
- * Club domestic league appearances and goals as of 25 February 2018 ‡ National team caps and goals as of 30 September 2009

Reinier Alcántara Núñez (born January 14, 1982) is a Cuban retired football player who played for Miami FC in the USL First Division.

== Career ==
=== Club ===
Alcántara made his debut with FC Pinar del Río at age of 15 and played with the team until the time of his defection to the United States. Has won Cuban league MVP award in 2006 and 2007, although this has not earned him much reward in his home nation because Cuban players are not permitted to sign professional contracts.

Alcántara defected from Cuba to the United States in 2008 in the hope of a securing professional career. Following his defection he trialed with several Major League Soccer clubs, including Chivas USA who filed a discovery claim on him following the 2008 season, which means that whomever the MLS awards the claim will have first rights to sign him to a professional contract.

Having not been offered an MLS contract, Alcántara joined Miami FC of the USL First Division for the 2009 season, alongside his compatriot Pedro Faife.

=== International ===
Alcántara was a member of Cuba's under 17 and 23 teams and in 2005 made his debut for the senior Cuba national team in a January 2005 Gold Cup qualification match against Haiti. During the 2007 Gold Cup on 8 June 2007 at Giants Stadium he scored the first goal of the match against Mexico. Alcántara has been capped 18 times for the national team, scoring 10 goals, but he is not expected to make any more appearances for the national team since his defection to the United States. He represented his country in only 2 FIFA World Cup qualifying matches.

== Personal life ==
=== Defection to the United States ===
Alcántara's formal job in Cuba was a sports complex maintenance employee since there were officially no professional footballers in Cuba. He defected to the United States when he disappeared from his hotel outside of Washington, D.C. before a CONCACAF 3rd round World Cup qualifier against the United States on 11 October 2008.

Alcántara planned his defection before he even left Cuba. He fled from the Cuban team's coaches and security at his hotel before the match. He eventually met up with a friend who drove him to Atlanta, Georgia, where he began his legal defection to the United States.

== Career statistics ==
=== International ===
Appearances and goals by national team and year
National team	Year	Apps	Goals
Cuba	2005	3	0
Cuba	2006	7	7
Cuba	2007	6	3
Cuba	2008	2	0
Career total		18	10

Scores and results list Cuba's goal tally first, score column indicates score after each Alcántara goal.

List of international goals scored by Reinier Alcántara
No.	Date	Venue	Opponent	Score	Result	Competition	Ref.
1	2 September 2006	Estadio Pedro Marrero, Havana, Cuba	Turks and Caicos Islands	3–0	6–0	2007 Caribbean Cup qualification	
2	2 September 2006	Estadio Pedro Marrero, Havana, Cuba	Turks and Caicos Islands	4–0	6–0	2007 Caribbean Cup qualification	
3	2 September 2006	Estadio Pedro Marrero, Havana, Cuba	Turks and Caicos Islands	5–0	6–0	2007 Caribbean Cup qualification	
4	4 September 2006	Estadio Pedro Marrero, Havana, Cuba	Bahamas	1–0	6–0	2007 Caribbean Cup qualification	
5	4 September 2006	Estadio Pedro Marrero, Havana, Cuba	Bahamas	5–0	6–0	2007 Caribbean Cup qualification	
6	4 September 2006	Estadio Pedro Marrero, Havana, Cuba	Bahamas	6–0	6–0	2007 Caribbean Cup qualification	
7	6 September 2006	Estadio Pedro Marrero, Havana, Cuba	Cayman Islands	1–0	7–0	2007 Caribbean Cup qualification	
8	24 March 2007	Estadio Guillermo Soto Rosa, Mérida, Venezuela	Venezuela	1–2	1–3	Friendly	
9	8 June 2007	Giants Stadium, New York City, United States	Mexico	1–0	1–2	2007 CONCACAF Gold Cup	
10	10 June 2007	Giants Stadium, New York City, United States	Panama	2–2	2–2	2007 CONCACAF Gold Cup	
