= Nesley Jean =

Bahamian footballer (born 1985)

Personal information
- Full name: Nesley Jean
- Date of birth: 16 March 1985 (age 41)
- Place of birth: Freeport, Bahamas
- Position: Forward

Senior career*
Years	Team	Apps	(Gls)
2007–2013	Bears		

International career
2004–2018	Bahamas	14	(6)
2004–2009	Bahamas Beach Soccer		

Managerial career
- 2014: Bahamas
- 2019–2024: Bahamas
- * Club domestic league appearances and goals

Nesley Jean (born 16 March 1985) is a former Bahamian international soccer player who played as a striker for the Bahamas national team, for which he was the head coach.

== Club career ==
Jean played for local side Bears.

== International career ==
He made his international debut for Bahamas in an October 2001 friendly match against Haiti and has earned a total of 13 caps, scoring 5 goals. He has represented his country in 5 FIFA World Cup qualification matches.

He also played for the national beach soccer team.

=== International goals ===
Scores and results list Bahamas' goal tally first.

#	Date	Venue	Opponent	Score	Result	Competition
1.	28 March 2004	BFA National Development Center, Nassau, Bahamas	Dominica	1–1	1–3	2006 FIFA World Cup qualification
2.	6 September 2006	Estadio Pedro Marrero, Havana, Cuba	Turks and Caicos Islands	2–1	3–2	2007 Caribbean Cup qualification
3.	19 November 2006	Barbados National Stadium, Bridgetown, Barbados	Barbados	2–1	2–1	2007 Caribbean Cup qualification
4.	2 July 2011	TCIFA National Academy, Providenciales, Turks and Caicos Islands	Turks and Caicos Islands	1–0	4–0	2014 FIFA World Cup qualification
5.	2 July 2011	TCIFA National Academy, Providenciales, Turks and Caicos Islands	Turks and Caicos Islands	3–0	4–0	2014 FIFA World Cup qualification
6.	14 October 2018	Thomas Robinson Stadium, Nassau, Bahamas	Anguilla	1–1	1–1	2019–20 CONCACAF Nations League qualification

== Managerial career ==
He retired after injuries and became a coach for the Bahamas U-17 team. He was named national team coach in summer 2014.
