= Shemord Thompson =

Bahamian footballer

Personal information
- Full name: Shemord Thompson
- Date of birth: January 15, 1987 (age 39)
- Place of birth: Nassau, Bahamas
- Height: 5 ft 6 in (1.68 m)
- Position: Defender

Team information
- Current team: Bears

College career
Years	Team	Apps	(Gls)
–2007	Tonkawa Mavericks		
2007–2010	Rogers State Hillcats		

Senior career*
Years	Team	Apps	(Gls)
2011–	Bears		

International career^{‡}
- Bahamas U15
- Bahamas U17
- Bahamas U20
- Bahamas U23
2006–2011	Bahamas	8	(1)
- * Club domestic league appearances and goals as of 8 December 2008 ‡ National team caps and goals as of 23 March 2021

Shemord Thompson (born 15 January 1987) is a Bahamian footballer who plays as a defender for BFA Senior League side Bears. He earned eight caps for the Bahamas national team between 2006 and 2011.

== Club career ==
Thompson played college soccer in the United States for Rogers State University, joining the Hillcats in 2007.

== International career ==
Thompson played for the Bahamas U-15, U-17, U-20 and U-21 teams and made his debut for the senior Bahamas in a September 2006 Caribbean Cup qualification match against the Cayman Islands, coming off the sub's bench to also score his first international goal. He had earned 6 caps by November 2008, 3 of them in World Cup qualification games.
