= Brunel Fucien =

Haitian footballer (born 1984)

Personal information
- Full name: Brunel Fucien
- Date of birth: 26 August 1984 (age 42)
- Place of birth: Port-au-Prince, Haiti
- Height: 1.75 m (5 ft 9 in)
- Position: Striker

Team information
- Current team: AS Capoise
- Number: 9

Youth career
- 2001–2004: Aigle Noir

Senior career*
| Years | Team | Apps | (Gls) |
| 2001–2004 | Aigle Noir | 0 | (0) |
| 2005 | → Cobreloa (loan) | 0 | (0) |
| 2005–2007 | Aigle Noir | 3 | (0) |
| 2008–2012 | Aiglon du Lamentin | 0 | (0) |
| 2012– | AS Capoise | 0 | (0) |

International career^{‡}
| 2004–2013 | Haiti | 45 | (8) |
- * Club domestic league appearances and goals as of 2 August 2021 ‡ National team caps and goals as of 2 August 2021

Brunel Fucien (born 26 August 1984) is a Haitian footballer currently playing for AS Capoise of the Ligue Haïtienne.

He previously played for Haitian club Aigle Noir AC, for Chilean club Cobreloa, and for Aiglon du Lamentin of Martinique.
