= Demont Mitchell =

American-Bahamian footballer (born 1988)

Personal information
- Full name: Demont Mitchell
- Date of birth: 24 October 1988 (age 38)
- Place of birth: Nassau, Bahamas
- Height: 5 ft 9 in (1.75 m)
- Positions: Midfielder; striker

Youth career
- 2000: Richmond Kickers
- 2005: Bears FC

Senior career*
Years	Team	Apps	(Gls)
2006–2011	Hofstra Pride	34	(5)

International career^{‡}
- Bahamas U20
- Bahamas U23
2008–2011	Bahamas	6	(1)
- * Club domestic league appearances and goals as of 8 December 2008 ‡ National team caps and goals as of 23 March 2021

Demont Mitchell (born 24 October 1988) is a retired association football player from The Bahamas who had his career cut short by injuries suffered in a car accident.

He has dual American-Bahamian citizenship.

== Club career ==
As a child, Mitchell had trials with Southampton and Wolverhampton Wanderers in the English football league. He played for Bears FC in the Bahamas before joining the Hofstra University in 2006.

== International career ==
Mitchell made his debut for the senior Bahamas in a March 2008 World Cup qualification match against the British Virgin Islands and has earned a total of six caps, scoring 1 goal, all of them in World Cup qualification games.

His final international was in July 2011 against the Turks and Caicos Islands.

== Personal life ==
Mitchell suffered a serious brain injury in a car accident in the Bahamas in October 2012 which left him in a coma for three weeks. A foundation dedicated to spread brain injury awareness was named after him in 2014. Also, a soccer tournament was staged in June 2015 to help in covering his medical expenses.
