= Cédrick Fiston =

French-Guadeloupean footballer (born 1981)

Personal information
- Full name: Cédric Fiston
- Date of birth: 12 April 1981 (age 45)
- Place of birth: Capesterre, Guadeloupe
- Height: 1.84 m (6 ft 0 in)
- Position: Striker

Team information
- Current team: AJSS Saintes
- Number: 9

Senior career*
Years	Team	Apps	(Gls)
1999–2001	PSG B	8	(2)
2002–2003	Girondins B	13	(5)
2003–2004	Académica Coimbra	4	(0)
2004–2006	ASG Juventus		
2006–	AJSS Saintes		

International career^{‡}
2007–2008	Guadeloupe	8	(2)
- * Club domestic league appearances and goals as of 1 September 2017 ‡ National team caps and goals as of 1 September 2017

Cédrick Fiston (born 12 April 1981) is a French-Guadeloupean footballer who plays striker.

== Club career ==
Currently, he plays his football in his native Guadeloupe. Previously, he has played for Girondins de Bordeaux in France.

== International career ==
He was a member of Guadeloupe's 2007 CONCACAF Gold Cup team. He is recognized for having scored against Haiti in Guadeoupe's first group stage of the tournament.
