= Gavin Christie =

Bahamian footballer

Personal information
- Full name: Gavin Christie
- Date of birth: 6 August 1981 (age 45)
- Place of birth: Nassau, Bahamas
- Position: Defender

Team information
- Current team: Cavalier
- Number: 41

Youth career
- 2000–2004: Charleston Golden Eagles

Senior career*
Years	Team	Apps	(Gls)
1999–	Cavalier	93	(4)
2003–2005	Motorlet		

International career
2000–2008	Bahamas	14	(1)
- * Club domestic league appearances and goals as of 7 May 2011

Gavin Christie (born 6 August 1981) is a Bahamian international soccer player, who plays as a defender for Cavalier FC and the Bahamas national team. He also plays beach soccer.

== Club career ==
Christie played US college soccer for Charleston Golden Eagles and semi-professional football in the Czech Republic for Motorlet Prague. On his return to the Bahamas he worked as a real estate agent and now as a broker at C.A. Christie & Co.

== International career ==
He made his international debut for Bahamas in a March 2000 FIFA World Cup qualification match against Anguilla and had earned a total of 14 caps, scoring no goals. He has represented his country in 8 FIFA World Cup qualification matches.

== Career statistics ==
=== International ===
Appearances and goals by national team and year
National team	Year	Apps	Goals
Bahamas	2000	4	0
Bahamas	2001	–	
Bahamas	2002	–	
Bahamas	2003	–	
Bahamas	2004	2	0
Bahamas	2005	–	
Bahamas	2006	6	1
Bahamas	2007	–	
Bahamas	2008	2	0
Total		14	1

Scores and results list the Bahamas' goal tally first, score column indicates score after each Christie goal.

List of international goals scored by Gavin Christie
No.	Date	Venue	Opponent	Score	Result	Competition
1	23 November 2006	Barbados National Stadium, Bridgetown, Barbados	Saint Vincent and the Grenadines	1–0	2–3	2007 Caribbean Cup qualification
