= Alexandre Boucicaut =

Haitian football player (born 1981)

Personal information
- Full name: Jean Michel Alexandre Boucicaut
- Date of birth: 18 November 1981 (age 44)
- Place of birth: Port-au-Prince, Haiti
- Height: 1.78 m (5 ft 10 in)
- Position: Midfielder

Senior career*
Years	Team	Apps	(Gls)
1999–2000	Racing CH		
2000–2004	Violette	47	(22)
2004	Chicago Fire	5	(0)
2005	Colorado Rapids	0	(0)
2006	Santa Fe		
2007	Querétaro		
2007	Violette		
2008–2013	Moca		
2014–2015	San Cristóbal FC	13	(9)
2015–2016	Moca		(10)
2017	Racing Haitien		
2018–2019	Atlético Vega Real		
2019	O&M		

International career
2001–2011	Haiti	45	(10)
- * Club domestic league appearances and goals

Jean Michel Alexandre Boucicaut (born 18 November 1981), known as Alexandre Boucicaut, is a Haitian former footballer who played as a midfielder for the Haiti national team.

== Club career ==
Boucicaut played 47 games from 2000 to 2004 for Violette AC in the Haitian First Division, scoring 22 goals during his four years with the popular Haitian side. Played with Racing Club Haïtien of the Haitian First Division during the 1999 and 2000 seasons.

Boucicaut became the fourth player from Haiti to play in Major League Soccer, following on the heels of retired Los Angeles Galaxy midfielder Sébastien Vorbe, Patrick Tardieu, and Jean Philippe Peguero.

Boucicaut won the 2013 Dominican Republic First Division league championship and was selected Most Valuable Player playing with Don Bosco Moca.

== International career ==
Boucicaut played 15 games for the Haiti under-23 national team and eight games for the senior national team. He has scored 12 international goals in his 23 combined appearances with the Haitian U23 and senior national teams.

Boucicaut scored Haiti's lone goal in the 67th minute of the team's 1–1 draw with the United States in an international friendly in 2004 at the Orange Bowl in Miami. He was named to Haiti's 2002 CONCACAF Gold Cup squad at the age of 20. He made his debut for the Haitian senior team in 2002 in a match against Honduras. He played 15 games for the Haitian U23, including three games during CONCACAF qualifying for the 2004 Olympics. He also was a Haiti squad member at the 2002 and 2007 Gold Cup Finals
