= 2007 CONCACAF Gold Cup =

9th edition of the CONCACAF Gold Cup

CONCACAF Championship
- 2007 CONCACAF Gold Cup official logo

Tournament details
- Host country: United States
- Dates: June 6–24
- Teams: 12 (from 1 confederation)
- Venues: 6 (in 6 host cities)

Final positions
- Champions: United States (4th title)
- Runners-up: Mexico

Tournament statistics
- Matches played: 25
- Goals scored: 64 (2.56 per match)
- Attendance: 921,464 (36,859 per match)
- Top scorer(s): (Honduras) Carlos Pavón (5 goals)
- Best player: (Canada) Julian de Guzman
- Best goalkeeper: (Guadeloupe) Franck Grandel
- Fair play award: Honduras

The 2007 CONCACAF Gold Cup was the ninth edition of the Gold Cup, the soccer championship of North America, Central America and the Caribbean (CONCACAF), and was won by the United States over Mexico. It was contested in the United States from June 6 to 24, 2007.

This competition was the third overall edition of the tournament without guests (for the first time since 1993) from other confederations. As the winner, the United States represented CONCACAF at the 2009 FIFA Confederations Cup.

== Qualified teams ==
A total of 12 teams qualified for the tournament. Three berths were allocated to North America, five to Central America, and four to the Caribbean.

Team	Qualification	Appearances	Last Appearance	Previous best performance	FIFA Ranking
North American zone
United States (TH)	Automatic	9th	2005	Champions (1991, 2002, 2005)	25
Mexico	Automatic	9th	2005	Champions (1993, 1996, 1998, 2003)	20
Canada	Automatic	8th	2005	Champions (2000)	94
Caribbean zone qualified through the 2007 Caribbean Cup
Haiti	Winners	3rd	2002	Quarterfinals (2002)	85
Trinidad and Tobago	Runners-up	7th	2005	Third Place (2000)	67
Cuba	Third Place	5th	2005	Quarterfinals (2003)	71
Guadeloupe	Fourth Place	1st	None	Debut	N/A
Central American zone qualified through the 2007 UNCAF Nations Cup
Costa Rica	Winners	8th	2005	Runners-up (2002)	52
Panama	Runners-up	3rd	2005	Runners-up (2005)	60
Guatemala	Third Place	8th	2005	Fourth Place (1996)	87
El Salvador	Fourth Place	5th	2003	Quarterfinals (2002, 2003)	144
Honduras	Fifth Place	8th	2005	Runners-up (1991)	55

== Venues ==
Miami	Carson	Foxborough
Miami Orange Bowl	The Home Depot Center	Gillette Stadium
Capacity: 72,319	Capacity: 27,000	Capacity: 68,756
East Rutherford	Houston	Chicago
Giants Stadium	Reliant Stadium	Soldier Field
Capacity: 80,042	Capacity: 71,500	Capacity: 61,500
Location of the host cities of the 2007 CONCACAF Gold Cup.

== Squads ==
The 12 national teams involved in the tournament were required to register a squad of 23 players; only players in these squads were eligible to take part in the tournament.

== Competition format ==
The twelve teams that qualified were divided into three groups. The top two teams in each group advanced to the knockout stage along with the best two of the third-place teams, filling out the knockout field of eight.

If teams were level on points, they were ranked on the following criteria in order:

1. Head to head matches between the tied teams (if applicable)
2. Greatest goal difference in group matches
3. Greatest number of goals scored in the three group matches
4. If teams are still tied, CONCACAF will hold a drawing of lots

== Match officials ==
- (Canada) Mauricio Navarro
- (Costa Rica) Wálter Quesada
- (Curaçao) Javier Jauregui
- (El Salvador) Joel Aguilar
- (Guatemala) Carlos Batres
- (Honduras) José Pineda

- (Jamaica) Courtney Campbell
- (Mexico) Benito Archundia
- (Mexico) Germán Arredondo
- (Mexico) Marco Antonio Rodríguez
- (Panama) Roberto Moreno

- (Suriname) Enrico Wijngaarde
- (Trinidad and Tobago) Neal Brizan
- (Trinidad and Tobago) Lee Davis
- (United States) Terry Vaughn

== Group stage ==
=== Group A ===
Pos	Team	Pld	W	D	L	GF	GA	GD	Pts	Qualification
1	Canada	3	2	0	1	5	3	+2	6	Advance to Knockout stage
2	Costa Rica	3	1	1	1	3	3	0	4	Advance to Knockout stage
3	Guadeloupe	3	1	1	1	3	3	0	4	Advance to Knockout stage
4	Haiti	3	0	2	1	2	4	−2	2	

June 6, 2007
19:00 UTC−4

Costa Rica	1–2	Canada
Centeno 56'	Report	De Guzman 57', 73'

Orange Bowl, Miami
Attendance: 17,420
Referee: Enrico Wijngaarde (Suriname)
June 6, 2007
21:00 UTC−4

Guadeloupe	1–1	Haiti
Fiston 54'	Report	Chéry 36' (pen.)

Orange Bowl, Miami
Attendance: 17,420
Referee: Terry Vaughn (United States)

June 9, 2007
19:00 UTC−4

Canada	1–2	Guadeloupe
Gerba 35'	Report	Angloma 10'; Fleurival 37'

Orange Bowl, Miami
Attendance: 22,529
Referee: Neal Brizan (Trinidad and Tobago)
June 9, 2007
21:00 UTC−4

Haiti	1–1	Costa Rica
Boucicaut 71'	Report	Centeno 62'

Orange Bowl, Miami
Attendance: 22,529
Referee: Courtney Campbell (Jamaica)

June 11, 2007
19:00 UTC−4

Costa Rica	1–0	Guadeloupe
Centeno 14'	Report

Orange Bowl, Miami
Attendance: 15,892
Referee: Enrico Wijngaarde (Suriname)
June 11, 2007
21:00 UTC−4

Haiti	0–2	Canada
	Report	De Rosario 31', 35' (pen.)

Orange Bowl, Miami
Attendance: 15,892
Referee: Marco Rodríguez (Mexico)

=== Group B ===
Pos	Team	Pld	W	D	L	GF	GA	GD	Pts	Qualification
1	United States	3	3	0	0	7	0	+7	9	Advance to Knockout stage
2	Guatemala	3	1	1	1	2	2	0	4	Advance to Knockout stage
3	El Salvador	3	1	0	2	2	6	−4	3	
4	Trinidad and Tobago	3	0	1	2	2	5	−3	1	

June 7, 2007
18:00 UTC−7

United States	1–0	Guatemala
Dempsey 26'	Report

The Home Depot Center, Carson
Attendance: 21,334
Referee: José Pineda (Honduras)
June 7, 2007
20:00 UTC−7

El Salvador	2–1	Trinidad and Tobago
Sánchez 38'; Alas 81'	Report	Spann 8'

The Home Depot Center, Carson
Attendance: 21,334
Referee: German Arredondo (Mexico)

June 9, 2007
12:00 UTC−7

Guatemala	1–0	El Salvador
Contreras 68'	Report

The Home Depot Center, Carson
Attendance: 27,000
Referee: Javier Jaurequi (Netherlands Antilles)
June 9, 2007
14:00 UTC−7

Trinidad and Tobago	0–2	United States
	Report	Ching 29'; Johnson 54'

The Home Depot Center, Carson
Attendance: 27,000
Referee: Roberto Moreno (Panama)

June 12, 2007
19:00 UTC−4

United States	4–0	El Salvador
Beasley 34', 89'; Donovan 45+4' (pen.); Twellman 73'	Report

Gillette Stadium, Foxborough
Attendance: 26,523
Referee: Benito Archundia (Mexico)
June 12, 2007
21:00 EDT

Trinidad and Tobago	1–1	Guatemala
McFarlane 87'	Report	Ruiz 83'

Gillette Stadium, Foxborough
Attendance: 26,523
Referee: José Pineda (Honduras)

=== Group C ===
Pos	Team	Pld	W	D	L	GF	GA	GD	Pts	Qualification
1	Honduras	3	2	0	1	9	4	+5	6	Advance to Knockout stage
2	Mexico	3	2	0	1	4	3	+1	6	Advance to Knockout stage
3	Panama	3	1	1	1	5	5	0	4	Advance to Knockout stage
4	Cuba	3	0	1	2	3	9	−6	1	

June 8, 2007
19:00 UTC−4

Panama	3–2	Honduras
Rivera 33'; B. Pérez 42'; Garcés 83'	Report	Guevara 40'; Costly 90+2'

Giants Stadium, East Rutherford
Attendance: 20,230
Referee: Mauricio Navarro (Canada)
June 8, 2007
21:00 UTC−4

Mexico	2–1	Cuba
Borgetti 38'; Castillo 56'	Report	Alcántara 23'

Giants Stadium, East Rutherford
Attendance: 20,230
Referee: Joel Aguilar (El Salvador)

June 10, 2007
16:00 UTC−4

Honduras	2–1	Mexico
Costly 57', 90+1'	Report	Blanco 29' (pen.)

Giants Stadium, East Rutherford
Attendance: 68,123
Referee: Wálter Quesada (Costa Rica)
June 10, 2007
18:00 UTC−4

Panama	2–2	Cuba
Garcés 14'; B. Pérez 45'	Report	Colomé 27'; Alcántara 74'

Giants Stadium, East Rutherford
Attendance: 68,123
Referee: Lee Davis (Trinidad and Tobago)

June 13, 2007
19:00 UTC−5

Cuba	0–5	Honduras
	Report	Pavón 3', 12', 42', 53'; Guevara 90' (pen.)

Reliant Stadium, Houston
Attendance: 68,417
Referee: Joel Aguilar (El Salvador)
June 13, 2007
21:00 UTC−5

Mexico	1–0	Panama
Salcido 60'	Report

Reliant Stadium, Houston
Attendance: 68,417
Referee: Carlos Batres (Guatemala)

=== Ranking of third-placed teams ===
Pos	Team	Pld	W	D	L	GF	GA	GD	Pts	Qualification
1	Panama	3	1	1	1	5	5	0	4	Advance to Knockout stage
2	Guadeloupe	3	1	1	1	3	3	0	4	Advance to Knockout stage
3	El Salvador	3	1	0	2	2	6	−4	3	

== Knockout stage ==
Quarter-finals
June 16 – Foxboro
Canada	3
Guatemala	0
June 16 – Foxboro
United States	2
Panama	1
June 17 – Houston
Honduras	1
Guadeloupe	2
June 17 – Houston
Mexico (a.e.t.)	1
Costa Rica	0

Semi-finals
June 21 – Chicago
Canada	1
United States	2
June 21 – Chicago
Guadeloupe	0
Mexico	1

Final
June 24 – Chicago
United States	2
Mexico	1

=== Quarter-finals ===
June 16, 2007
13:00 UTC−4

Canada	3–0	Guatemala
De Rosario 17'; Gerba 33', 44'	Report

Gillette Stadium, Foxborough
Attendance: 22,412
Referee: Courtney Campbell (Jamaica)

June 16, 2007
16:00 UTC−4

United States	2–1	Panama
Donovan 60' (pen.); Bocanegra 62'	Report	B. Pérez 85'

Gillette Stadium, Foxborough
Attendance: 22,412
Referee: Neal Brizan (Trinidad and Tobago)

June 17, 2007
14:00 UTC−5

Mexico	1–0 (a.e.t.)	Costa Rica
Borgetti 97'	Report

Reliant Stadium, Houston
Attendance: 70,092
Referee: Terry Vaughn (United States)

June 17, 2007
17:00 UTC−5

Honduras	1–2	Guadeloupe
Pavón 70'	Report	Angloma 17'; Socrier 20'

Reliant Stadium, Houston
Attendance: 70,092
Referee: Mauricio Navarro (Canada)

=== Semi-finals ===
June 21, 2007
18:00 UTC−5

Canada	1–2	United States
Hume 76'	Report	Hejduk 39'; Donovan 45+1' (pen.)

Soldier Field, Chicago
Attendance: 50,760
Referee: Benito Archundia (Mexico)

June 21, 2007
21:00 UTC−5

Mexico	1–0	Guadeloupe
Pardo 70'	Report

Soldier Field, Chicago
Attendance: 50,760
Referee: Roberto Moreno (Panama)

=== Final ===
June 24, 2007
14:00 UTC−5

United States	2–1	Mexico
Donovan 62' (pen.); Feilhaber 73'	Report	Guardado 44'

Soldier Field, Chicago
Attendance: 60,000
Referee: Carlos Batres (Guatemala)

== Statistics ==
=== Goalscorers ===
5 goals

- (Honduras) Carlos Pavón

4 goals

- (United States) Landon Donovan

3 goals

- (Canada) Dwayne De Rosario
- (Canada) Ali Gerba
- (Costa Rica) Walter Centeno
- (Honduras) Carlos Costly
- (Panama) Blas Pérez

2 goals

- (Canada) Julian de Guzman
- (Cuba) Reynier Alcántara
- (Guadeloupe) Jocelyn Angloma
- (Honduras) Amado Guevara
- (Mexico) Jared Borgetti
- (Panama) José Luis Garcés
- (United States) DaMarcus Beasley

1 goal

- (Canada) Iain Hume
- (Cuba) Jaime Colomé
- (El Salvador) Dennis Alas
- (El Salvador) Ramón Sánchez
- (Guadeloupe) Cédrick Fiston
- (Guadeloupe) David Fleurival
- (Guadeloupe) Richard Socrier
- (Guatemala) José Manuel Contreras
- (Guatemala) Carlos Ruiz
- (Haiti) Alexandre Boucicaut
- (Haiti) Monès Chéry
- (Mexico) Cuauhtémoc Blanco
- (Mexico) Nery Castillo
- (Mexico) Andrés Guardado
- (Mexico) Pável Pardo
- (Mexico) Carlos Salcido
- (Panama) Carlos Rivera
- (Trinidad and Tobago) Errol McFarlane
- (Trinidad and Tobago) Silvio Spann
- (United States) Carlos Bocanegra
- (United States) Brian Ching
- (United States) Clint Dempsey
- (United States) Benny Feilhaber
- (United States) Frankie Hejduk
- (United States) Eddie Johnson
- (United States) Taylor Twellman

== Awards ==
=== Winners ===
2007 CONCACAF Gold Cup winners

United States
Fourth title

=== Individual awards ===
Top Scorer:	Most Valuable Player:	Top Goalkeeper:	Fair Play Award:
(Honduras) Carlos Pavón	(Canada) Julian de Guzman	(Guadeloupe) Franck Grandel	Honduras

=== All-Tournament team ===
The All-Tournament Team was selected by the CONCACAF Technical Study Group and features the "Best XI" along with seven Honorable Mentions. The player selections were made from the eight teams that reached the quarterfinals of the 2007 CONCACAF Gold Cup.

All-Star Team
Goalkeepers	Defenders	Midfielders	Forwards
(Guadeloupe) Franck Grandel	(Panama) Felipe Baloy (Canada) Richard Hastings (United States) Frankie Hejduk (Mexico) Carlos Salcido	(Costa Rica) Walter Centeno (Canada) Julian de Guzman (United States) Pablo Mastroeni (Mexico) Pável Pardo	(Honduras) Carlos Pavón (Panama) Blas Pérez

Honorable Mention
Goalkeepers	Defenders	Midfielders	Forwards
(Costa Rica) Jose Francisco Porras	(Honduras) Samuel Caballero (Canada) Paul Stalteri	(United States) DaMarcus Beasley (Mexico) Andrés Guardado	(Guadeloupe) Jocelyn Angloma (United States) Landon Donovan

== Controversy ==
During the last minutes of the semi-final match between Canada and the U.S.A., Canada's Atiba Hutchinson scored a goal that would have equalised the score for Canada. However, a linesman erroneously indicated that Hutchinson was offside, and the referee Benito Archundia subsequently nullified Hutchinson's goal. Video replays showed that the football came into contact with the U.S.A.'s defender Oguchi Onyewu immediately before Hutchinson scored the goal. Therefore, according to the laws of the game, there was no offside offence for Hutchinson.
