= 2026 USVISF Premier League season =

Professional soccer league season

USVISF Premier League
- Season: 2026
- All statistics correct as of 15:47, 20 July 2025 (UTC).

The 2026 USVISF Premier League season is the twentieth season of top flight soccer in the U.S. Virgin Islands and the third season as the USVISF Premier League. Helenites SC are the defending champions, having defeated Raymix SC in the 2025 playoff final. The season is expected to begin in June 2026.

== Divisions ==
=== Saint Croix Division ===
Pos	Team	Pld	W	D	L	GF	GA	GD	Pts	Qualification	A1	A2	A4	A3
1	CAPA	0	0	0	0	0	0	0	0	Advance to Semi-finals	—			
2	Helenites SC	0	0	0	0	0	0	0	0	Advance to Semi-finals		—		
3	Rovers SC	0	0	0	0	0	0	0	0				—	
4	Prankton SC	0	0	0	0	0	0	0	0					—

Updated to match(es) played on unknown. Source:

=== Saint Thomas Division ===
Pos	Team	Pld	W	D	L	GF	GA	GD	Pts	Qualification	B3	B4	B1	B2
1	New Vibes SC	0	0	0	0	0	0	0	0	Advance to Semi-finals	—			
2	Raymix SC	0	0	0	0	0	0	0	0	Advance to Semi-finals		—		
3	Castaways SC	0	0	0	0	0	0	0	0				—	
4	Massey SA	0	0	0	0	0	0	0	0					—

Updated to match(es) played on unknown. Source:

== Play-offs ==
=== Semi-finals ===
v

v

=== 3rd place match ===
v

=== Final ===
v
