= 2024 USVISF Premier League season =

Professional soccer league season

USVISF Premier League
- Season: 2024
- Dates: May 19 – October 27 (Regular Season); November 23 – November 24 (Playoffs)
- Champions: Rovers SC
- All statistics correct as of 00:01, 28 June 2025 (UTC).

The 2024 USVISF Premier League season is the eighteenth season of top flight soccer in the U.S. Virgin Islands and the first season as the USVISF Premier League.

New Vibes SC were the defending champions, having defeated United We Stand SC in the 2022–23 playoff final.

Rovers SC went undefeated on the season en route to the club's first championship. Rovers defeated Helenites SC in the playoff final. By virtue of its league championship, the Rovers qualified as the USVI's representative in the 2025 CFU Club Shield held in Trinidad and Tobago.

== Divisions ==
=== Saint Croix Division ===
Pos	Team	Pld	W	D	L	GF	GA	GD	Pts	Qualification	A4	A2	A1	A3	A4	A2	A1	A3
1	Rovers SC	10	10	0	0	59	4	+55	30	Advance to Semi-finals	—				—			
2	Helenites SC	11	8	0	3	46	15	+31	24	Advance to Semi-finals		—				—		
3	Unique FC	11	2	0	9	17	52	−35	6				—				—	
4	Prankton SC	10	1	0	9	6	57	−51	3					—				—

Updated to match(es) played on June 27, 2025. Source: Global Sports Archive

==== Saint Croix Division final ====
July 7

Rovers SC	3–0 (Awarded)	Helenites SC
	Report

Bethlehem Soccer Stadium, Upper Bethlehem, Saint Croix

=== Saint Thomas Division ===
Pos	Team	Pld	W	D	L	GF	GA	GD	Pts	Qualification	B1	B2	B3	B4	B5	B1	B2	B3	B4	B5
1	LRVI FC	15	13	1	1	81	16	+65	40	Advance to Semi-finals	—					—				
2	New Vibes SC	14	12	0	2	70	14	+56	36	Advance to Semi-finals		—					—			
3	Raymix SC	13	4	0	9	10	36	−26	12				—					—		
4	Massey SA	14	3	1	10	18	36	−18	10					—					—	
5	United We Stand SC	15	2	1	12	5	63	−58	7						—					—

Updated to match(es) played on June 27, 2025. Source: Global Sports Archive

==== Saint Thomas Division final ====
August 1

LRVI FC	Cancelled	New Vibes SC
	Report

== Play-offs ==
=== Semi-finals ===
November 23
1:00pm

Rovers SC	2–1	New Vibes SC
	Report

Bethlehem Soccer Stadium, Upper Bethlehem, Saint Croix
November 23
3:00pm

LRVI FC	2–3	Helenites SC
	Report

Bethlehem Soccer Stadium, Upper Bethlehem, Saint Croix

=== 3rd place match ===
November 24
12:00pm

LRVI FC	5–4	New Vibes SC
	Report

Bethlehem Soccer Stadium, Upper Bethlehem, Saint Croix

=== Final ===
November 24
2:00pm

Rovers SC	3–1	Helenites SC
	Report

Bethlehem Soccer Stadium, Upper Bethlehem, Saint Croix
