= List of soccer clubs in the United States Virgin Islands =

This is a list of soccer clubs in the United States Virgin Islands.

- Central Link (St.Thomas)
- Chelsea (St.Croix)
- Free Will Baptist (St.Croix)
- Haitian Victory
- Helenites (St.Croix)
- Hess Oil Company (St.Croix)
- Laraza (St.Thomas)
- MI Roc Masters (St.Thomas)
- New Vibes (St.Thomas)
- Positive Vibes (St.Thomas)
- Prankton United (St.Croix)
- Raymix (St.Thomas)
- Rovers United (St.Croix)
- Saint John United SC (St.Thomas)
- Skills FC (St.Croix)
- Togetherness (St.Thomas)
- Unique FC (St.Croix)
- United We Stand SC (St.Thomas)
- Waitikubuli United SC (St.Thomas)
- 340 soccer (St.Croix)
