= 2025 USVISF Premier League season =

Professional soccer league season

USVISF Premier League
- Season: 2025
- Dates: June 8 – September 15 (Regular Season); October 11 – October 12 (Playoffs)
- Champions: Helenites SC
- Top goalscorer: (Jamaica) Trevon Thorpe (16 goals)
- All statistics correct as of 15:47, 20 July 2025 (UTC).

The 2025 USVISF Premier League season is the nineteenth season of top flight soccer in the U.S. Virgin Islands and the second season as the USVISF Premier League. Rovers SC are the defending champions, having defeated Helenites SC in the 2024 playoff final.

The league kicked off on June 8, 2025 with CAPA defeating Rovers SC in the Saint Croix Division and New Vibes SC downed Massey SA in the Saint Thomas Division. With back-to-back play-off victories over New Vibes SC and Raymix SC, Helenites SC won its record sixth league title.

== Divisions ==
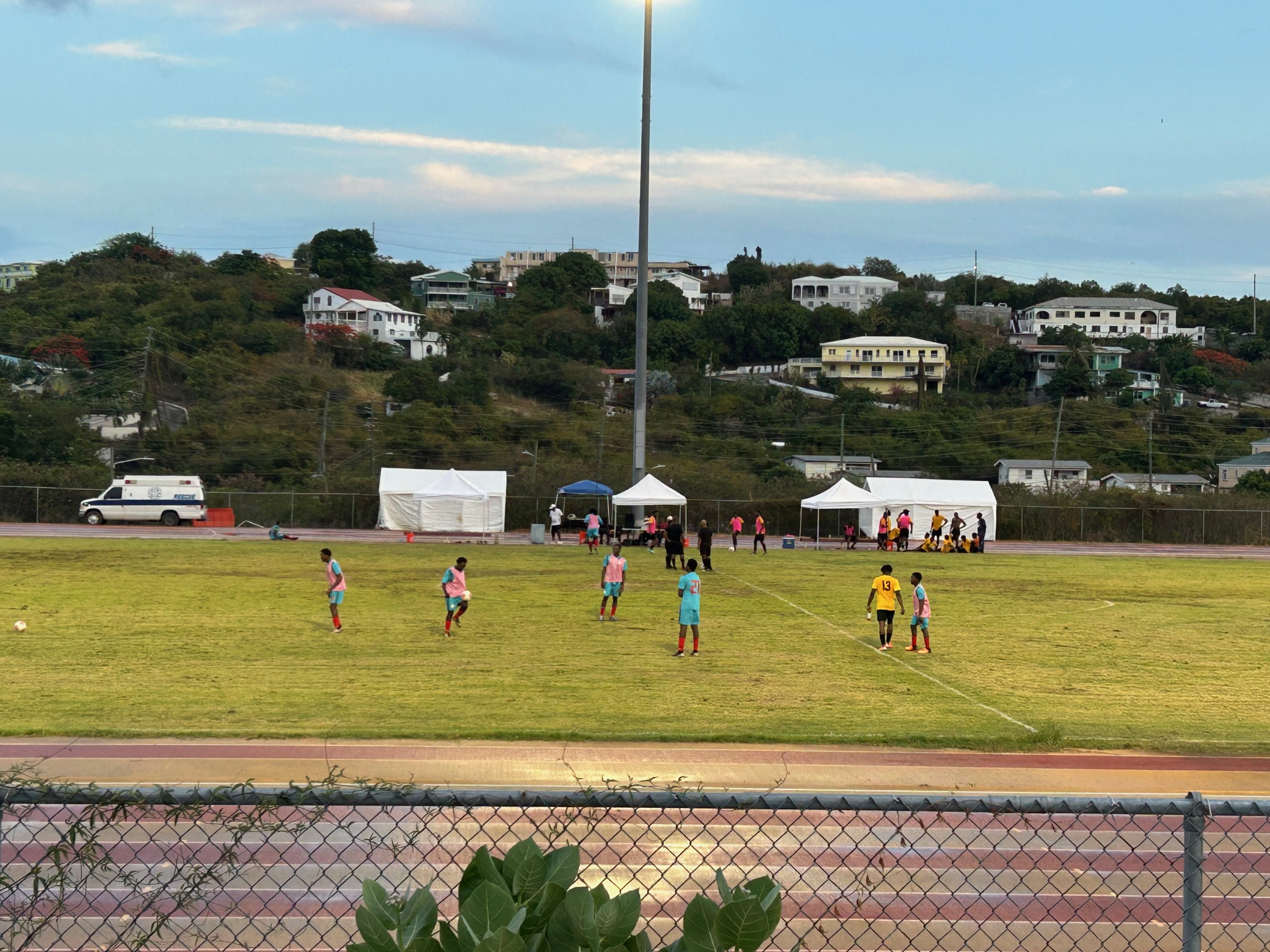
Match between Raymix SC and New Vibes SC on July 13, 2025

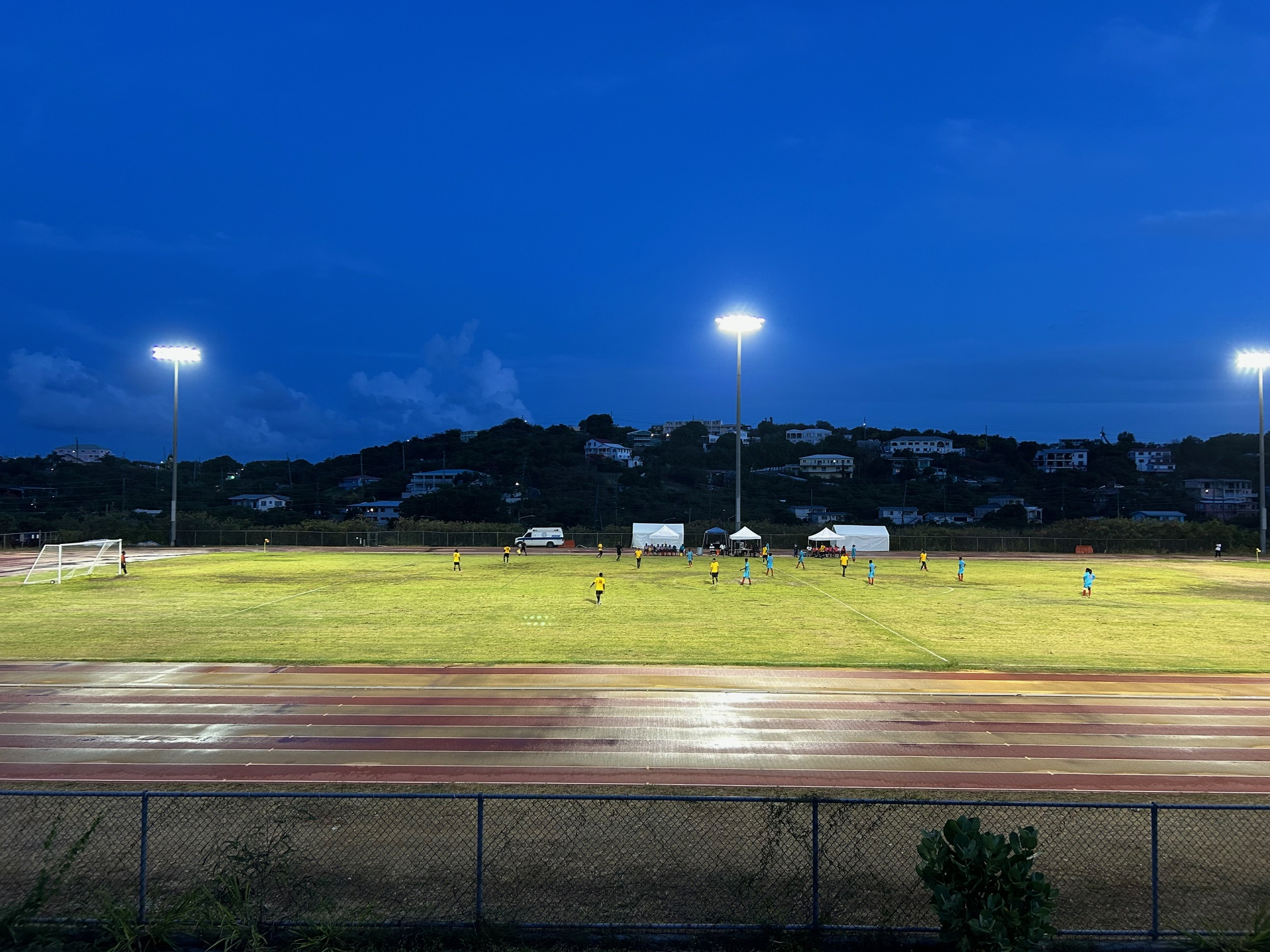
Second half of the match

=== Saint Croix Division ===
| Pos | Team | Pld | W | D | L | GF | GA | GD | Pts | Qualification | A1 | A2 | A4 | A3 |
|---|---|---|---|---|---|---|---|---|---|---|---|---|---|---|
| 1 | CAPA | 6 | 4 | 1 | 1 | 38 | 8 | +30 | 13 | Advance to Semi-finals | — | | | |
| 2 | Helenites SC | 6 | 3 | 2 | 1 | 23 | 9 | +14 | 11 | Advance to Semi-finals | | — | | |
| 3 | Rovers SC | 6 | 3 | 1 | 2 | 23 | 7 | +16 | 10 | | | | — | |
| 4 | Prankton SC | 6 | 0 | 0 | 6 | 2 | 63 | −61 | 0 | | | | | — |

Updated to match(es) played on September 6, 2025. Source: Global Sports Archive

=== Saint Thomas Division ===
| Pos | Team | Pld | W | D | L | GF | GA | GD | Pts | Qualification | B3 | B4 | B1 | B2 |
|---|---|---|---|---|---|---|---|---|---|---|---|---|---|---|
| 1 | New Vibes SC | 6 | 5 | 1 | 0 | 26 | 6 | +20 | 16 | Advance to Semi-finals | — | | | |
| 2 | Raymix SC | 6 | 2 | 3 | 1 | 11 | 9 | +2 | 9 | Advance to Semi-finals | | — | | |
| 3 | Castaways SC | 6 | 1 | 1 | 4 | 13 | 21 | −8 | 4 | | | | — | |
| 4 | Massey SA | 6 | 1 | 1 | 4 | 10 | 24 | −14 | 4 | | | | | — |

Updated to match(es) played on September 9, 2025. Source: Global Sports Archive

== Play-offs ==
=== Semi-finals ===
October 11, 2025
2:00pm

| CAPA | 0–0 | Raymix SC |
|---|---|---|
| | Report |
Penalties
| Greene (penalty scored); Yorke (penalty scored) | 2–4 | Pratt (penalty scored); H. Omilus (penalty scored); Pierre (penalty scored); B. Omilus (penalty scored) |

Bethlehem Soccer Stadium, Upper Bethlehem
October 11, 2025
4:00pm

| New Vibes SC | 0–4 | Helenites SC |
|---|---|---|
| | Report | Shaffer 53'; Joseph 72'; Winchester 78'; Atkinson 85' |

Bethlehem Soccer Stadium, Upper Bethlehem

=== 3rd place match ===
October 12, 2025
2:00pm

| CAPA | 4–2 (a.e.t.) | New Vibes SC |
|---|---|---|
| Thorpe 13', 91'; Bell 86', 92' | Report | Henry 4'; Browne 8' |

Bethlehem Soccer Stadium, Upper Bethlehem

=== Final ===
October 12, 2025
4:00pm

| Raymix SC | 2–9 | Helenites SC |
|---|---|---|
| D’Haiti 21'; Pierre 90' | Report | Elizee 11', 45', 52'; Winchester 15'; Shaffer 25', 73', 88'; Joseph 26'; John 80' |

Bethlehem Soccer Stadium, Upper Bethlehem

== Top goalscorers ==
| Rank | Name | Goals |
|---|---|---|
| 1 | (Jamaica) Trevon Thorpe | 16 |
| 2 | (United States Virgin Islands) Naqwan Henry | 8 |
| 3 | (United States Virgin Islands) Raejae Joseph | 7 |
| 4 | (United States Virgin Islands) Rakeem Joseph | 6 |
| 5 | (Jamaica) Davion Bell | 5 |
| 6 | (United States) Leonardo Regala | 5 |
| 7 | (Saint Lucia) Mackean St. Croix | 4 |
| 8 | (United States Virgin Islands) Ramesses McGuiness | 4 |
| 9 | (Venezuela) Vasco Palacios | 3 |
| 10 | (Dominica) Glenson Scotland | 3 |
