= 2018–19 U.S. Virgin Islands Premier League =

U.S. Virgin Islands Premier League
- Season: 2018–19
- Champions: Helenites
- Caribbean Club Shield: Helenites

The 2018–19 U.S. Virgin Islands Premier League was the first season of the U.S. Virgin Islands Premier League, and the 15th season of the U.S. Virgin Islands Soccer Championship, the top division soccer competition in the United States Virgin Islands. The season began on 14 October 2018 and ended on 17 February 2019.

== Teams ==
For the first time, teams from the two main islands, Saint Croix and Saint Thomas, competed together in the same league (previously, they played in their own leagues in St. Croix and St. Thomas respectively before the top teams of the two leagues advanced to the playoffs). A total of eight teams, with four teams from each island, competed in the regular season.

Teams from Saint Croix:

- Helenites
- Prankton United
- Rovers FC
- Unique

Teams from Saint Thomas:

- LRVI FC
- New Vibes
- Raymix
- United We Stand

Teams played those of same island twice and of other island once in the regular season. The top four teams, regardless of island, advanced to the playoffs.

== Regular season ==
Pos	Team	Pld	W	D	L	GF	GA	GD	Pts	Qualification or relegation
1	Unique	10	7	2	1	29	14	+15	23	Advance to Playoffs
2	Raymix	10	7	0	3	24	15	+9	21	Advance to Playoffs
3	Helenites	10	6	2	2	32	14	+18	20	Advance to Playoffs
4	United We Stand	10	6	1	3	58	20	+38	19	Advance to Playoffs
5	New Vibes	10	5	0	5	24	18	+6	15	
6	Rovers	10	3	3	4	20	14	+6	12	
7	Prankton United	10	1	1	8	16	67	−51	4	
8	LRVI FC	10	0	1	9	11	52	−41	1	

Source: USVI Soccer Association

== Playoffs ==
Semifinals (27 January & 3 February)
2	Raymix	0	2	2
3	Helenites	2	3	5
1	Unique	0	0	0
4	United We Stand	1	1	2

Final (17 February)
3	Helenites	2
4	United We Stand	1

Helenites, who play at the 1,000-capacity Grove Place Park, won championship qualified for Caribbean Club Shield.
