= 2014–15 U.S. Virgin Islands Championship =

Football championship season

In the 2014–15 football season, the U.S. Virgin Islands Championship was won by Helenites SC of the St. Croix Soccer League, beating Raymix SC of the St. Thomas League in the final.

== Qualification ==
=== St. Thomas Soccer League ===
Pos	Team	Pld	W	D	L	GF	GA	GD	Pts	Qualification
1	Raymix (Q)	16	14	0	2	78	13	+65	42	Qualification for U.S. Virgin Islands Championship
2	Haitian Victory (Q)	13	11	1	1	38	11	+27	34	Qualification for U.S. Virgin Islands Championship
3	Positive Vibes	14	7	5	2	43	20	+23	26	
4	New Vibes	15	7	3	5	40	24	+16	24	
5	UWS	16	5	2	9	24	26	−2	17	
6	Laraza	14	5	1	8	29	44	−15	16	
7	Togetherness	16	2	4	10	25	55	−30	10	
8	MI Roc Masters	14	3	1	10	18	77	−59	10	
9	Waitikubuli United	14	2	3	9	20	45	−25	9	

Updated to match(es) played on 2 August 2015. Source: RSSSF
Rules for classification: 1) points; 2) goal difference; 3) number of goals scored.
(Q) Qualified for the phase indicated

=== St. Croix Soccer League ===
1. Helenites (champions)
2. Rovers (qualified)

other participants:

- Freewill
- Prankton
- True Players
- Unique

== Tournament ==
=== Bracket ===
Semifinals
Helenites	5
Haitian Victory	0
Raymix	7
Rovers	1

Final
Helenites	3
Raymix	1

=== Semifinals ===
February 7, 2015	Helenites	5–0	Haitian Victory	Charlotte Amalie
	Marcellin 43'; Mathurin 57', 71'; Daniel 83'; King 90'	Report		Stadium: Lionel Roberts Park

February 7, 2015	Raymix	7–1	Rovers	Charlotte Amalie
	Smith 5', 20'; Wrensford, Jr. 10', 57'; Allen 22', 43', 69'	Report	Washington 36'	Stadium: Lionel Roberts Park

=== Third place match ===
February 8, 2015	Haitian Victory	3–0	Rovers	Charlotte Amalie
		Report		Stadium: Lionel Roberts Park

=== Final ===
February 8, 2015	Raymix	1–3	Helenites	Charlotte Amalie
	Smith 90+1'	Report	Plummer 6' (o.g.); Abbot 65'; George 71' (o.g.)	Stadium: Lionel Roberts Park
