= United States Virgin Islander soccer clubs in North American competitions =

This is a list of United States Virgin Islander soccer clubs in North American competitions. U.S. Virgin Islands clubs have participated in competitive international soccer competitions since 1992, when Unique FC entered the 1992 CONCACAF Champions' Cup.

No club from the U.S. Virgin Islands has won a CONCACAF or CFU competition.

== Results by competition ==
=== CONCACAF Champions Cup / Champions League ===
Season	Club	Round	Opponent	Home	Away	Agg.
1992	Rockmaster	QR1	(Martinique) Union Sportive Robert	1–4	0–6	1–10
1992	Unique	QR1	(Dominican Republic) San Cristóbal	3–3	1–2	4–5
1993	Rovers	QR1	(Martinique) Franciscain	2–6	1–10	3–16
1993	Zion Inter	QR1	(Guadeloupe) L'Etoile	0–3	0–3	0–6

=== CFU Club Championship ===
Season	Club	Round	Opponent	Home	Away	Agg.
2001	UWS Upsetters	R1	(Haiti) Racing	0–3	0–3	0–6
2005	Positive Vibes Victory	R1	(Saint Lucia) Northern United All Stars	2–0	0–5	2–5
2006	New Vibes	GS	(Aruba) Britannia	1–1		1–1
2006	New Vibes	GS	(Trinidad and Tobago) San Juan Jabloteh	0–5		0–5
2006	New Vibes	GS	(Antigua and Barbuda) SAP	1–3		1–3
2006	Positive Vibes Victory	GS	(Haiti) Aigle Noir	3–2		3–2
2006	Positive Vibes Victory	GS	(Netherlands Antilles) CSD Barber	0–2		0–2
2006	Positive Vibes Victory	GS	(Jamaica) Harbour View	0–5		0–5
2007	Helenites	GS	(Suriname) Leo Victor	0–4		0–4
2007	Helenites	GS	(Jamaica) Portmore United	0–2		0–2
2015	Helenites	GS	(Haiti) Don Bosco	1–5		1–5
2015	Helenites	GS	(The Bahamas) Lyford Cay	0–1		0–1
2015	Helenites	GS	(Guadeloupe) USR	2–2		2–2

=== CFU Club Shield ===
Season	Club	Round	Opponent	Home	Away	Agg.
2025	Rovers	GS	(Puerto Rico) Academia Quintana		0–5	
2025	Rovers	GS	(Turks and Caicos Islands) Academy Eagles		0–5	
2026	Helenites	R1	(Saint Kitts and Nevis) St. Paul's United	3–0		
2026	Helenites	R16	(Haiti) Baltimore	w/o		
2026	Helenites	QF	(Puerto Rico) Metropolitan	1–2		

== Appearances in CONCACAF competitions ==
As of July 28, 2026

Club	Total						CCL	CCC	CFU	CGC	CWC	First Appearance	Last Appearance
Club	Apps	Pld	W	D	L	Win%	CCL	CCC	CFU	CGC	CWC	First Appearance	Last Appearance
Helenites	3	8	2	1	5	.313	0	2	1	0	0	2007 CFU Club Championship	2026 CFU Club Shield
New Vibes	1	3	0	1	2	.167	0	1	0	0	0	2006 CFU Club Championship	2006 CFU Club Championship
Positive Vibes Victory	2	5	2	0	3	.400	0	2	0	0	0	2005 CFU Club Championship	2006–07 CFU Club Championship
Rovers	2	4	0	0	4	.000	1	0	1	0	0	1993 CONCACAF Champions' Cup	2025 CFU Club Shield
Unique	1	2	0	1	1	.250	1	0	0	0	0	1992 CONCACAF Champions' Cup	1992 CONCACAF Champions' Cup
