= 2015–16 U.S. Virgin Islands Championship =

The 2015–16 U.S. Virgin Islands Championship was a four-team tournament that determined the domestic champion of the U.S. Virgin Islands.

== Regular season ==
=== St. Croix Soccer League ===
| Team | Pts | Qualification |
|---|---|---|
| Helenites | 45 | Qualified for the tournament |
| Unique FC | 37 | Qualified for the tournament |
| Rovers | 33 | |
| Free Will Baptist | 27 | |
| Buccaneers | 26 | |
| True Players | 7 | |
| Prankton United | 4 | |

As of May 7, 2016

=== St. Thomas Soccer League ===
No points were announced, just the final standings:

1. Raymix (champions)
2. Haitian Victory (qualified)
3. UWS
4. New Vibes
5. Waitikubuli
6. Togetherness
7. Laraza

== Tournament ==
=== Bracket ===
Semifinals
T1 | Raymix | 5
C2 | Unique | 0
C1 | Helenites | 5
T2 | Haitian Victory | 1

Championship
T1 | Raymix | 3
C1 | Helenites | 2
Consolation
C2 | Unique | 4
T2 | Haitian Victory | 2

=== Results ===
==== Semifinals ====
February 13

| Raymix | 5–0 | Unique |
|---|---|---|
| Rogers; Nevil; Toussaint; McLeod |

February 13

| Helenites | 5–1 | Haitian Victory |
|---|---|---|
| Daniel; St. Croix; Robinson; Marcellin | | Smith |

==== Consolation match ====
February 14

| Unique | 4–2 | Haitian Victory |
|---|---|---|
| Browne; Daniel; Walters | | Smith |

==== Final ====
February 14

| Helenites | 2–3 | Raymix |
|---|---|---|
| Peter 5'; St. Croix 64' | | McLeod 34' (pen.); Rogers 53'; Hypolite 76' |
