= 2016–17 U.S. Virgin Islands Championship =

U.S. Virgin Islands Championship
- Season: 2016–17
- Champions: Raymix
- CFU Club Championship: Raymix; Helenites
- Matches: 24 known
- Biggest home win: Helenites 7–0 Prankton (30 October 2016)
- Biggest away win: Unique 2–8 Helenites (6 November 2016)
- Highest scoring: Prankton 0–8 Helenites (27 November 2016)
- All statistics correct as of 19 April 2017.

The 2016–17 U.S. Virgin Islands Championship was the 14th edition of the competition. The season began on 30 October 2016 and ended on 12 February 2017. The championship itself was a four-team tournament that determined the domestic champion of the U.S. Virgin Islands, based on the top two finishers in the St. Croix and St. Thomas Leagues.

The defending champions, Raymix, successfully defended their title, defeating Helenites, 1–0, in the championship.

== Regular season ==
=== St. Croix Soccer League ===
Helenites and Rovers qualified.

=== St. Thomas Soccer League ===
Raymix and Positive Vibes Victory qualified.

== Tournament ==
=== Results ===
==== Semifinals ====
February 11

Helenites	1–1 (a.e.t.)	Positive Vibes Victory
	Report
Penalties
	4–3

Lionel Roberts Park, Charlotte Amalie

February 11

Raymix	2–1	Rovers
	Report

Lionel Roberts Park, Charlotte Amalie

==== Consolation match ====
February 12

Rovers	0–5	Positive Vibes Victory
	Report

Lionel Roberts Park, Charlotte Amalie

==== Final ====
February 12

Raymix	1–0	Helenites
Laurencin 76'	Report

Lionel Roberts Park, Charlotte Amalie
