= 2022–23 U.S. Virgin Islands Association Club Championship =

US Virgin Islands top league season

U.S. Virgin Islands Association Club Championship
- Season: 2022–23
- Champions: New Vibes
- Biggest home win: Helenites SC 16 - 1 Prankton SC
- Biggest away win: Prankton SC 0 - 19 Helenites SC
- Highest scoring: Prankton SC 0 - 19 Helenites SC
- Longest winless run: Prankton (9 games)
- Longest losing run: Prankton (9 games)

The 2022–23 U.S. Virgin Islands Association Club Championship was the 17th season of top-tier soccer in the United States Virgin Islands and the first season under the branding of Association Club Championship. This is the first season the US Virgin Islands has hosted a domestic club league or championship since the beginning of the COVID-19 pandemic. The season began with the St. Thomas and St. Croix Soccer League seasons on October 20, 2022. It concluded with the association club final on March 12, 2023. New Vibes SC won the final in front of dozens of spectators.

== Teams ==
=== St. Croix ===
- Helenites
- Prankton
- Rovers
- Unique

=== St. Thomas ===
- LRVI
- New Vibes
- Raymix
- United We Stand
- Waitikubuli

== Table ==
=== St. Croix League ===
Pos	Team	Pld	W	D	L	GF	GA	GD	Pts	Qualification
1	Helenites	9	8	0	1	32	4	+28	24	Qualification for Association Club Championship
2	Rovers	9	5	1	3	20	5	+15	16	Qualification for Association Club Championship
3	Unique	9	4	1	4	16	6	+10	13	
4	Prankton	9	0	0	9	1	54	−53	0	

Source: RSSSF
Rules for classification: 1) points; 2) total wins; 3) total goal differential; 4) total goals scored; 5) fewer disciplinary points; 6) away goal differential; 7) away goals scored; 8) home goals differential; 9) home goals scored; 10) coin toss (2 clubs tied) or drawing of lots (≥3 clubs tied)

=== St. Thomas League ===
Pos	Team	Pld	W	D	L	GF	GA	GD	Pts	Qualification
1	LRVI	7	5	0	2	36	15	+21	15	
2	New Vibes	6	5	0	1	19	5	+14	15	Qualification for Association Club Championship
3	United We Stand	6	4	0	2	24	10	+14	12	Qualification for Association Club Championship
4	Waitikubuli	7	1	0	6	13	19	−6	3	
5	Raymix	6	1	0	5	3	46	−43	3	

Source: RSSSF
Rules for classification: 1) points; 2) total wins; 3) total goal differential; 4) total goals scored; 5) fewer disciplinary points; 6) away goal differential; 7) away goals scored; 8) home goals differential; 9) home goals scored; 10) coin toss (2 clubs tied) or drawing of lots (≥3 clubs tied)

== Association Club Championship ==
=== Qualified teams ===
- Saint Croix: Helenites, Rovers
- Saint Thomas: New Vibes, United We Stand

=== Bracket ===
Semi-finals
March 10 - Upper Bethlehem
New Vibes	1
Rovers	0
March 10 - Upper Bethlehem
Helenites	1
United We Stand	3

Final
March 12 - Upper Bethlehem
New Vibes	4
United We Stand	0
Third place
March 12 - Upper Bethlehem
Rovers	3
Helenites	1

=== Results ===
==== Semifinals ====
March 10

New Vibes	1 - 0	Rovers

Bethlehem Soccer Complex, Upper Bethlehem

March 10

Helenites	1 - 3	United We Stand

Bethlehem Soccer Complex, Upper Bethlehem

=== Third place match ===
March 12

Rovers	3 - 1	Helenites

Bethlehem Soccer Complex, Upper Bethlehem

=== Championship ===
March 12

New Vibes	4 - 0	United We Stand

Bethlehem Soccer Complex, Upper Bethlehem
