= Whelan Joseph =

U.S. Virgin Islands association footballer

Personal information
- Date of birth: December 20, 2002 (age 23)
- Place of birth: Saint Thomas, U.S. Virgin Islands
- Height: 1.90 m (6 ft 3 in)
- Position: Goalkeeper

Team information
- Current team: Ponce FC

College career
Years	Team	Apps	(Gls)
2020–2023	Southeastern Blackhawks	20	(0)
2023–2024	Eastern Illinois Panthers	6	(0)

Senior career*
Years	Team	Apps	(Gls)
2019–2020	New Vibes		
2020–2026	Helenites SC		
2023	Victory Eagles	2	(0)
2025	Houston FC	9	(0)
2026	Treasure Beach	3	(0)
2026	Des Moines Menace	7	(0)
2026–	Ponce FC	6	(0)

International career^{‡}
2024–	United States Virgin Islands	8	(0)
- * Club domestic league appearances and goals as of 18:25, 24 September 2026 (UTC) ‡ National team caps and goals as of 19:46, 3 August 2026 (UTC)

Whelan Joseph (born December 20, 2002) is a United States Virgin Islands soccer player who plays as a goalkeeper for Liga Puerto Rico Pro club Ponce FC and the United States Virgin Islands national team.

== Club career ==
As a youth, Joseph played for Victory Eagles SC in Saint Lucia. He later joined New Vibes SC in the US Virgin Islands before moving to Helenites SC in 2020. In 2021, he committed to playing college soccer in the United States with the Blackhawks of Southeastern Community College. That season, he was named the ICCAC Player of the Week for May 17-24 after giving up one total goal across the Region XI Championship and Plains District Championship matches and posting a 9–0 season record. That season, Joseph lead the Blackhawks to the NJCAA Division II championship, along with international teammate Jimson St. Louis.

After two seasons with the Blackhawks, it was announced that Joseph was transferring to the Eastern Illinois Panthers of the NCAA Division I for the 2023 season. During the summer before his first season with the Panthers, Joseph rejoined his youth club Victory Eagles SC in Saint Lucia's SLFA First Division. Joseph returned to Helenites for the 2025 USVISF Premier League season after graduating from Eastern Illinois University. In summer 2025, he joined Houston FC of the USL League Two for the 2025 season. In January 2026, it was announced that he had signed for Treasure Beach of the Jamaica Premier League from Helenites. He then returned to the USL League Two, joining the Des Moines Menace for the 2026 season.

On August 1, 2026 reigning Liga Puerto Rico Pro champions Ponce FC announced that they had signed Joseph for the upcoming season.

== International career ==
As a youth, Joseph represented Saint Lucia, including in the 2017 CONCACAF Boys' Under-15 Championship. Joseph made his senior international debut for the United States Virgin Islands on March 26, 2024 in a 2026 FIFA World Cup qualification match against the British Virgin Islands.

== Career statistics ==
As of match played March 28, 2026

Appearances and goals by national team and year
National team	Year	Apps	Goals
United States Virgin Islands	2024	3	0
United States Virgin Islands	2025	3	0
United States Virgin Islands	2026	2	0
Total		8	0
