= CAPA (soccer) =

- Full name: Champion Athletic Performance Academy
- Ground: Bethlehem Soccer Stadium
- Capacity: 1,200
- Manager: Harry Nelson
- League: USVISF Premier League
- 2025: 3rd
- Website: https://www.capavi.org/

The Champion Athletic Performance Academy (CAPA) is a soccer club based in Saint Croix, United States Virgin Islands. The club competes in the USVISF Premier League, the top tier of soccer in the United States Virgin Islands.

== History ==
CAPA played its first Premier League match on 8 June 2025, an eventual 2–1 win over reigning champions Rovers SC. Prior to the defeat, Rovers had been on a record undefeated streak. CAPA's first goal was scored by Yeison Gudiño while Trevon Thorpe notched the game-winner. After dominating the St. Croix Division during the regular season, CAPA was defeated on penalties by Raymix SC in the semi-final. In the consolation match, CAPA came from behind to defeat New Vibes SC 4–2 to end its maiden Premier League season with a third-place finish.

== Domestic history ==
Key

Champion Runners-up 3rd Place

| Season | League | | | | | | | | Notes |
| Season | Div. | Pos. | Pl. | W | D | L | P | Playoffs | Notes |
|---|---|---|---|---|---|---|---|---|---|
| 2025 | USVISF Premier League (St. Croix Division) | 1st | 6 | 4 | 1 | 1 | 13 | 3rd | |
| 2026 | USVISF Premier League (St. Croix Division) | | | | | | | | |

== Women’s team ==
CAPA has fielded a women’s team since 2023. The team competes in the USVISF Women’s Premier League.
