= Castaways SC =

Castaways Soccer Club LRVI FC
- Nickname: The Castaways
- Founded: 2006; 20 years ago
- Ground: Castaways Park; Sapphire Beach, U.S. Virgin Islands
- President & Manager: Joseph Limeburner
- League: USVISF Premier League
- 2024: 1st, STT Division
- Website: Official Website

Castaways Soccer Club (aka LRVI FC) is a United States Virgin Islands professional soccer club based in Saint Thomas. The club competes in the USVISF Premier League, the top tier of soccer in the United States Virgin Islands. Castawarys was the first club in the United States Virgin Islands officially licensed by CONCACAF.

== History ==
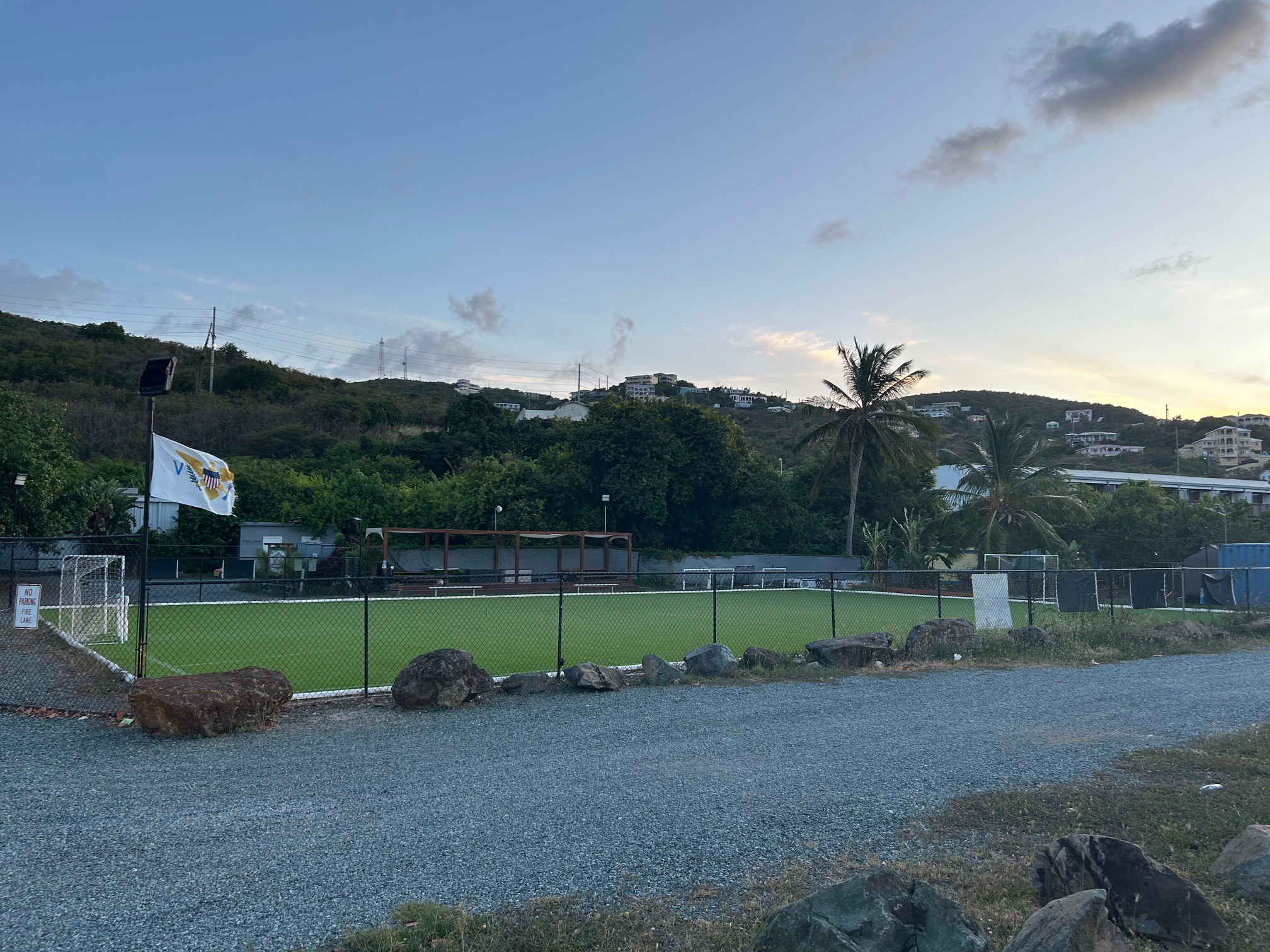
Castaways Park in July 2025

The club was founded as Laraza FC in 2006 by Joseph Limeburner who has also served as the coach for the under-17 and under-20 national teams and assistant coach of the under-23 national team. The senior team originally began playing in the St. Thomas League for the 2006/2007 season. By the 2018–19 season, the team was competing in the Premier League as the St. Thomas League and St. Croix League combined for the first time.

During the 2024 USVISF Premier League season, the club was dominant as the champions of the Saint Thomas Division and qualified for the league semi-finals. The Castaways were upset by Saint Thomas runner-up Helenites SC. Ultimately, the club finished third overall after defeating New Vibes SC in the bronze medal match. The club opened its 2025 USVISF Premier League season with a 2–2 draw with Raymix SC.

== Youth ==
Castaways Soccer Club has had a large youth development program on Saint Thomas since 2014. In 2021, the club opened a second academy on Saint John. The club's youth sides have been participating in numerous competitions abroad including the Disney Cup since 2013. In 2019 four of the club's youth players, including senior internationals Connor Querrard and Jimson St. Louis, went on trial at the academies of seven professional clubs in Spain. Castaways Soccer Club also helps players find opportunities to play college soccer in the United States. The club regularly plays match against teams from abroad, including a series of friendlies against CF Fraigcomar Academy of Puerto Rico in 2024.

== Stadium ==
The club's stadium, Castaways Park, has the first artificial turf surface on St. Thomas. Like all Premier League clubs in the Saint Thomas Division, Castaways SC plays its league matches at the Ivanna Eudora Kean High School Field.

== Domestic history ==
Key

Champion Runners-up 3rd Place

Season	League							Play-offs	Notes
Season	Div.	Pos.	Pl.	W	D	L	P	Play-offs	Notes
2018–19	1st (STT Division)	10th	10	0	1	9	1	DNQ	
2019–20	1st (STT Division)	Cancelled due to the COVID-19 pandemic							
2020–21	1st (STT Division)	Cancelled due to the COVID-19 pandemic							
2021–22	1st (STT Division)	Cancelled due to the COVID-19 pandemic							
2022–23	1st (STT Division)	1st	7	5	0	2	15	DNQ	
2024	1st (STT Division)	1st	15	13	1	1	40	3rd	
2025	1st (STT Division)	3rd	6	1	1	4	4	DNQ	

== Women's team ==
Castaways Soccer Club has also fielded a team in the USVISF Women's Premier League since the league was founded in 2024. The club finished second in the league's inaugural season, falling to the Lady Rovers in the final.

== Gallery ==
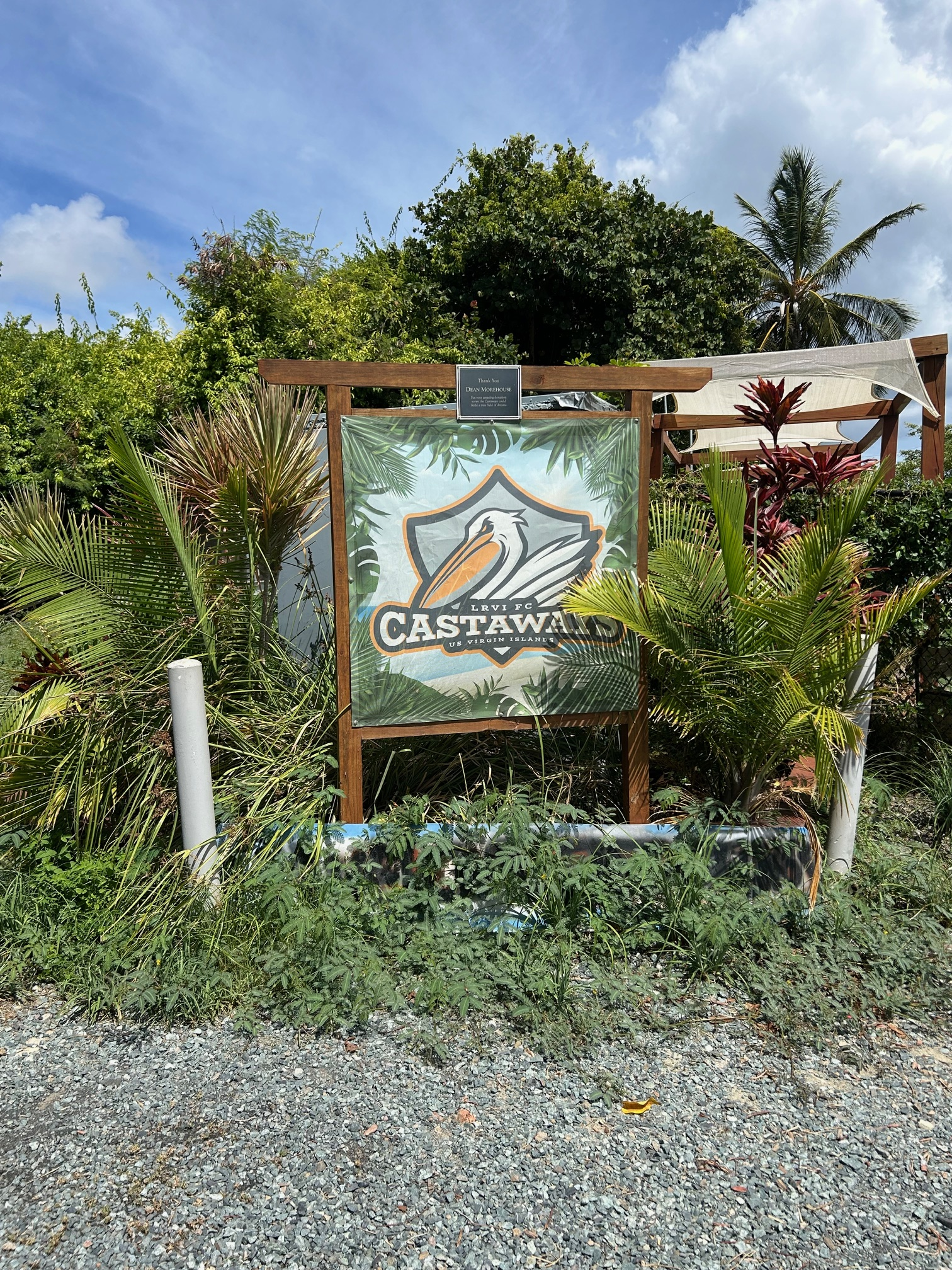

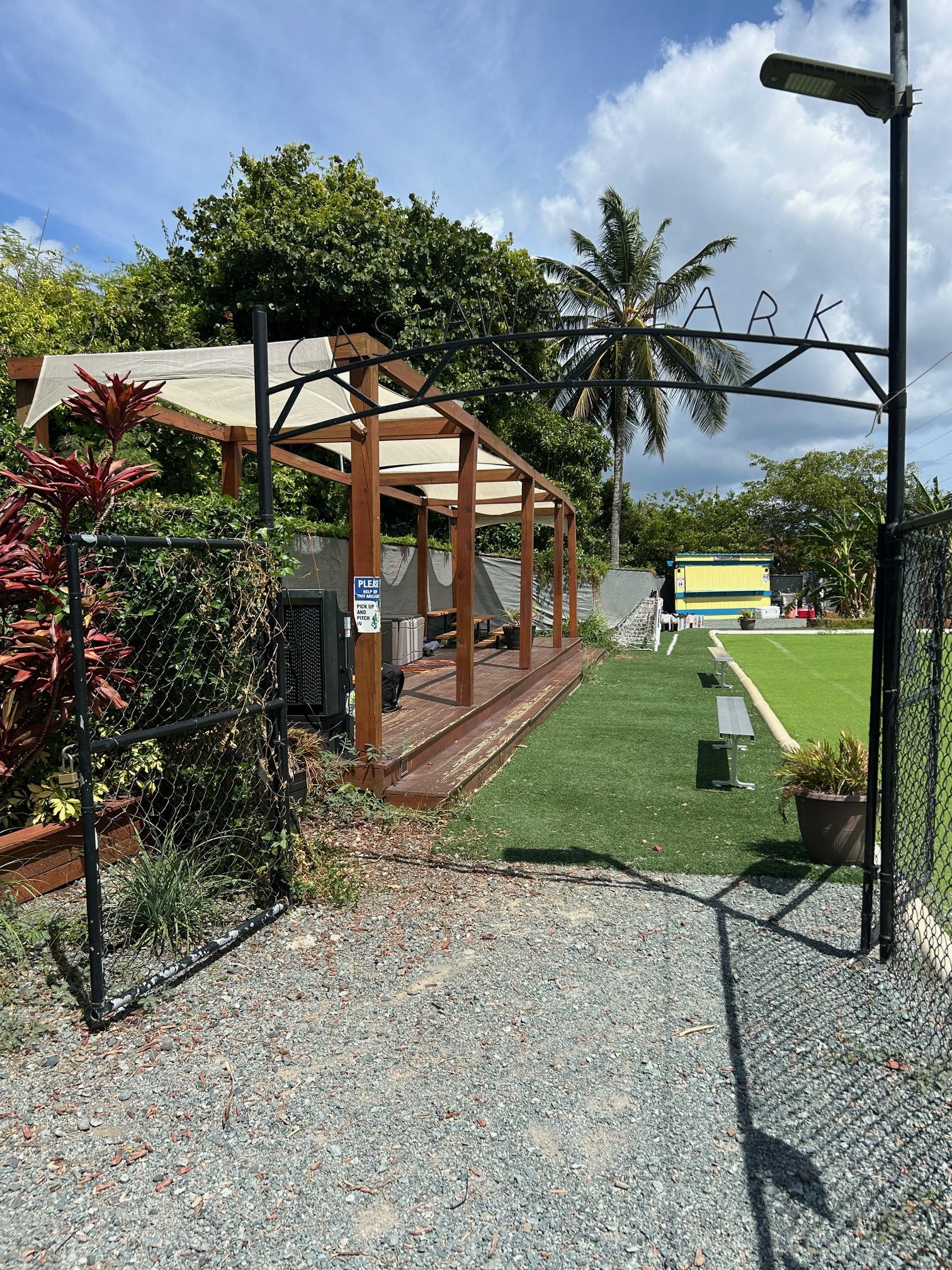

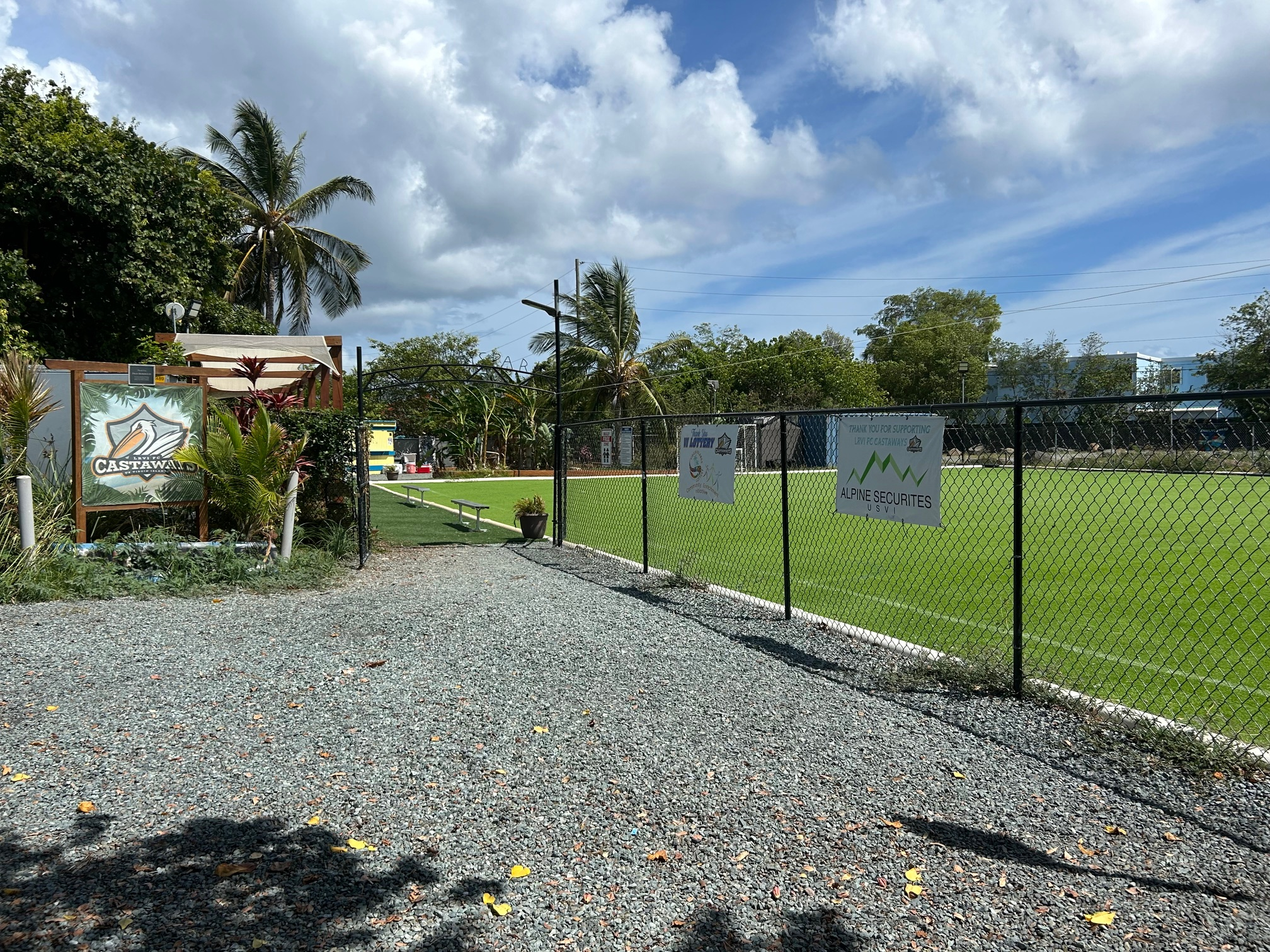

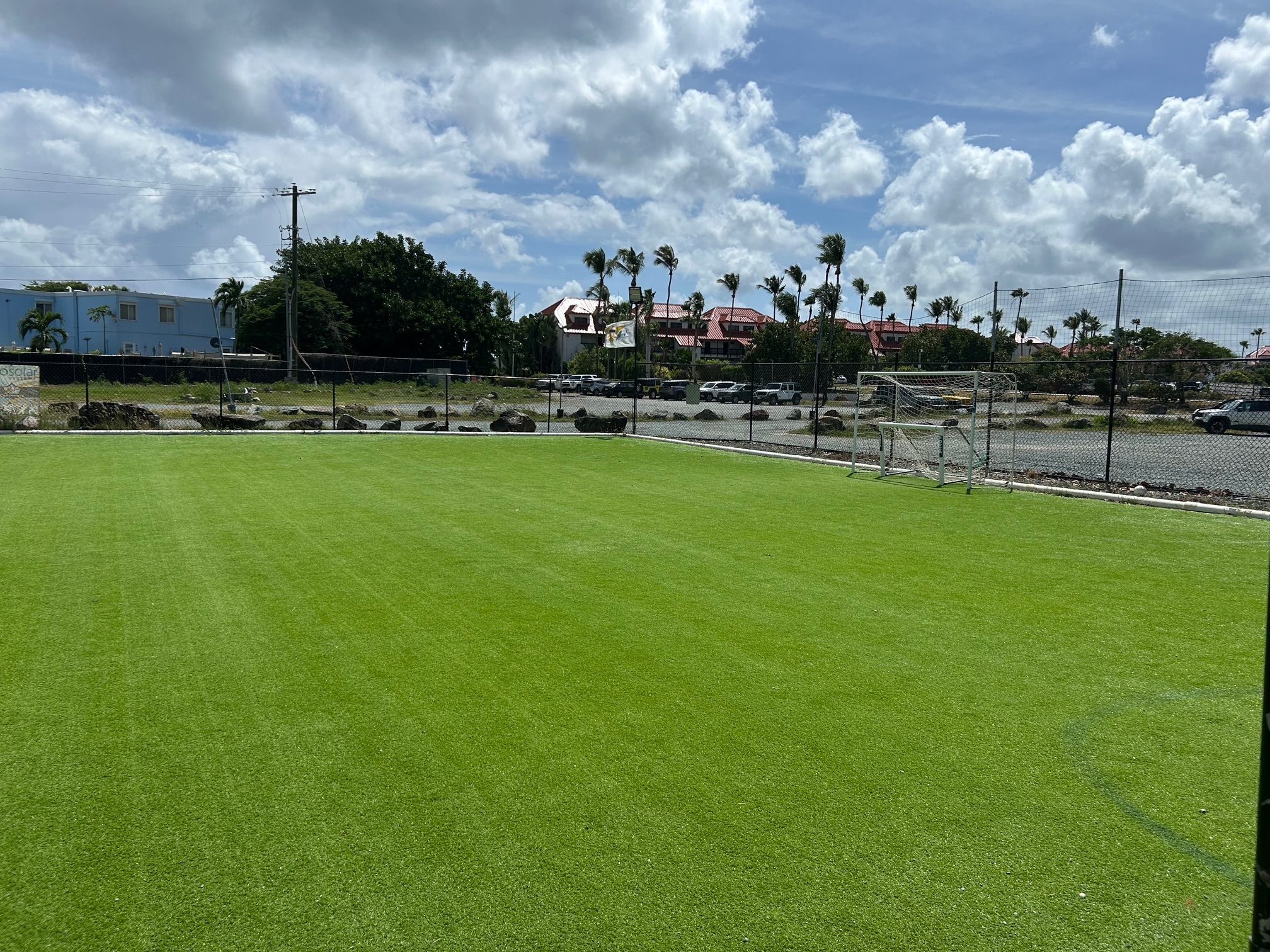

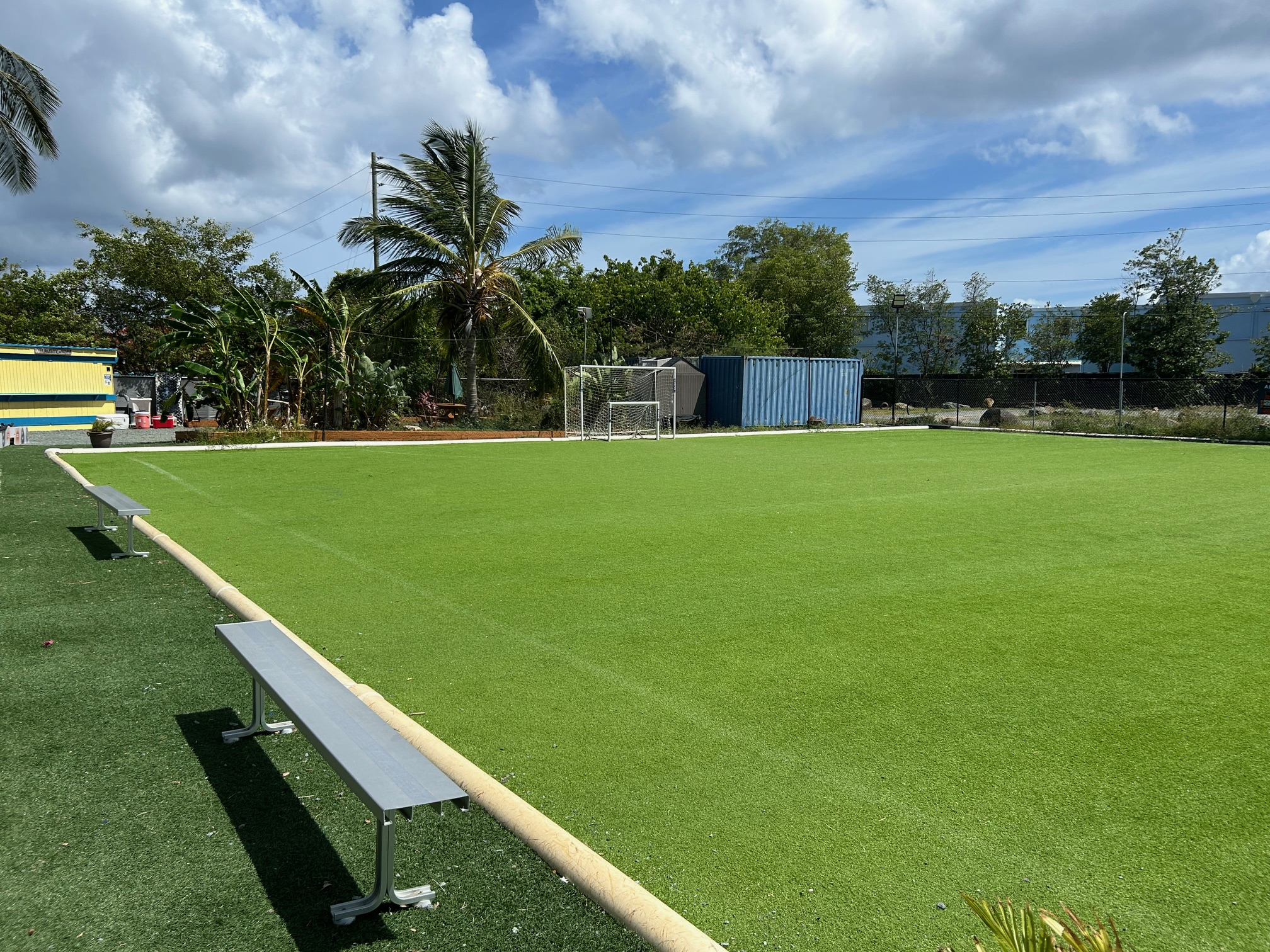

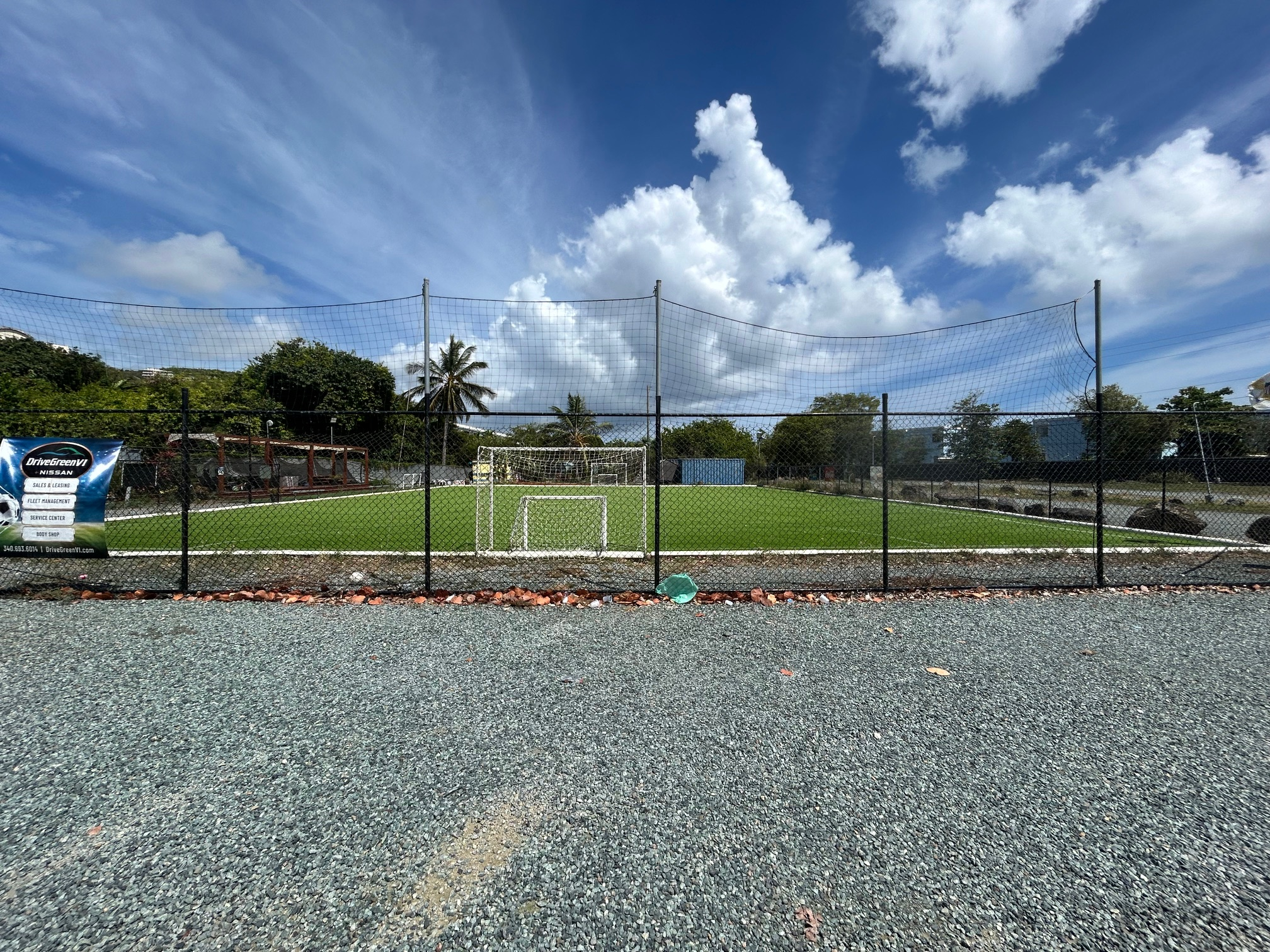

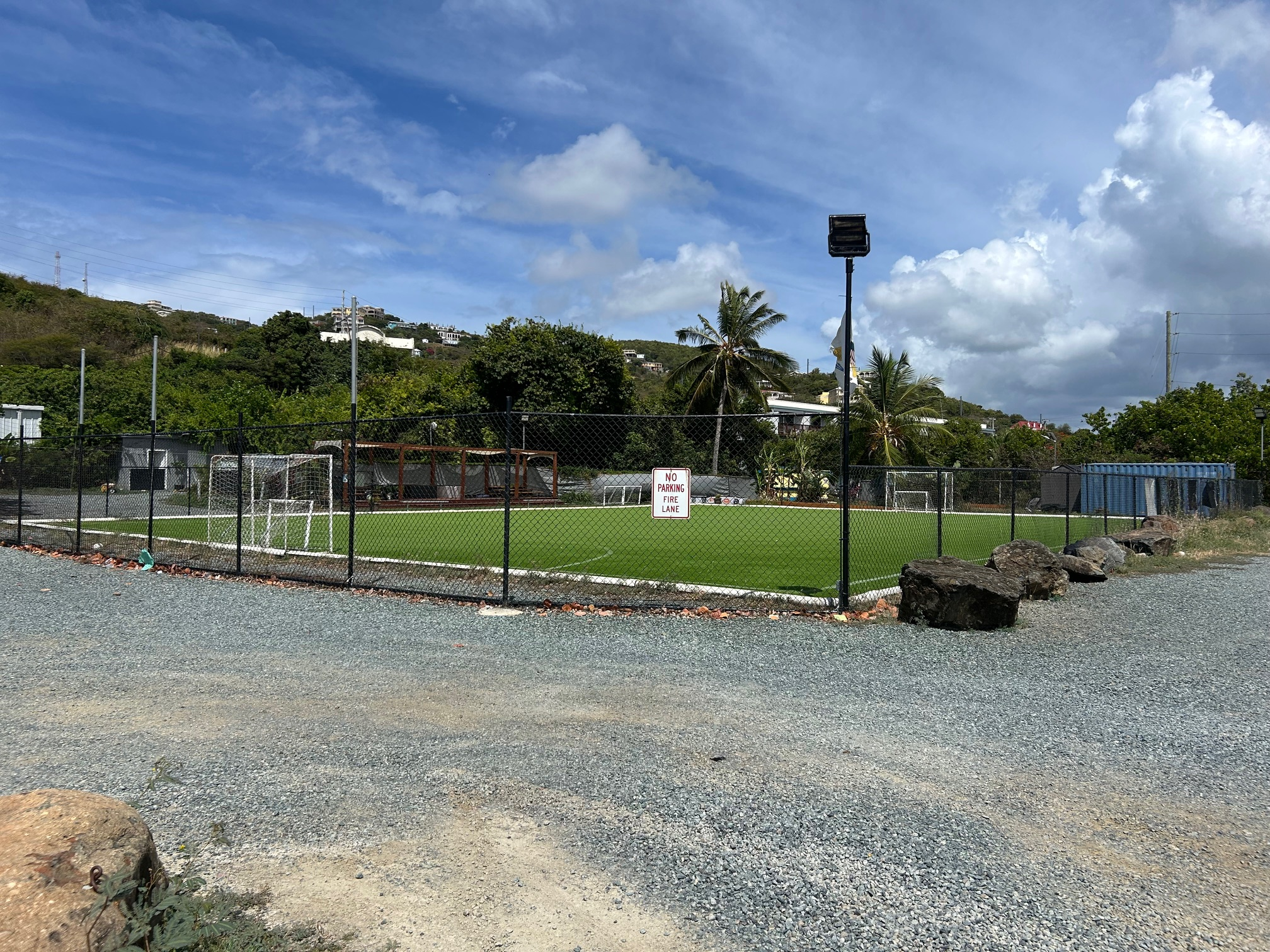

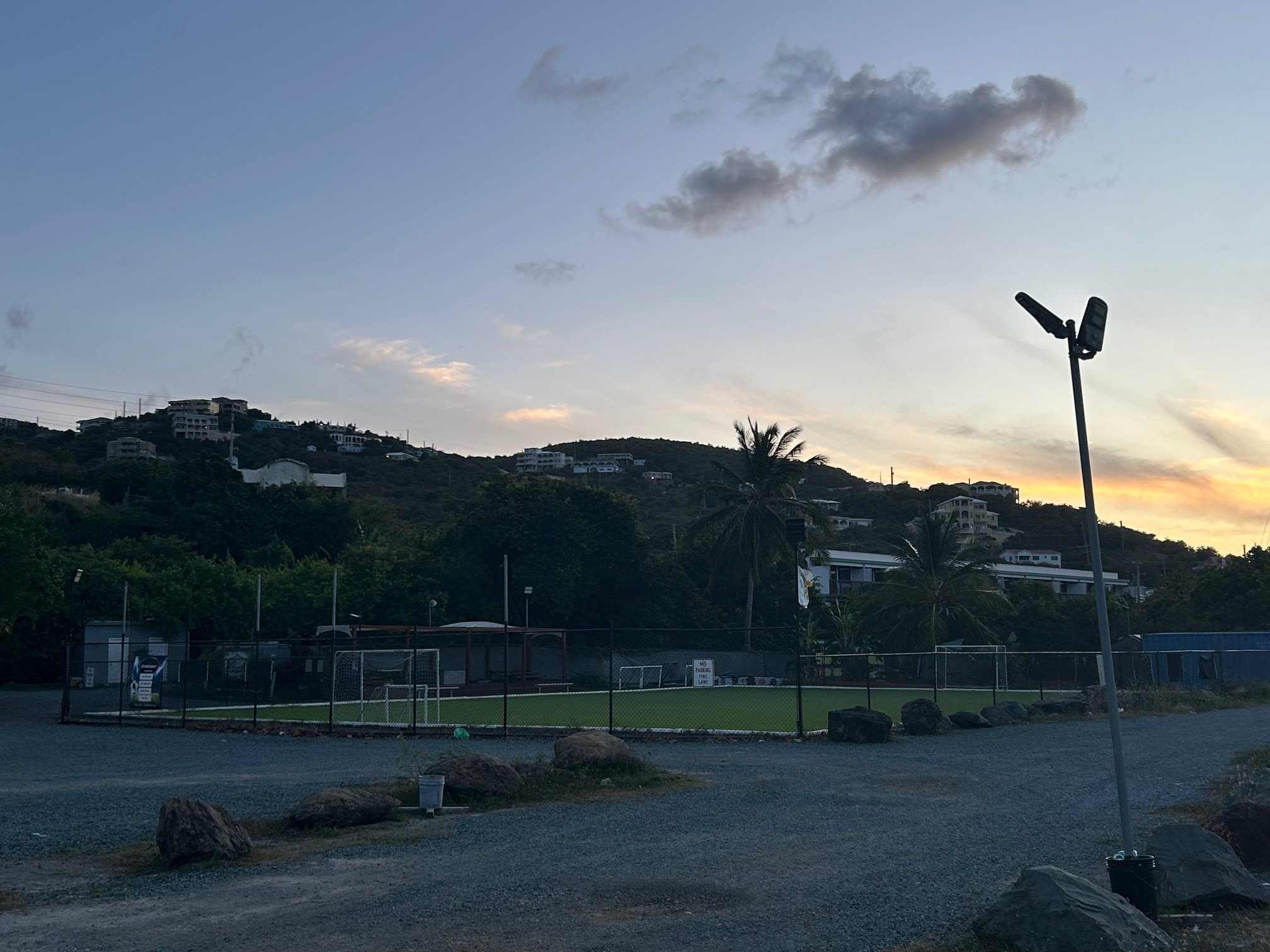
