= Jimson St. Louis =

U.S. Virgin Islands association footballer

Personal information
- Date of birth: December 2, 2002 (age 23)
- Place of birth: Jacksonville, Florida, United States
- Height: 5 ft 9 in (1.75 m)
- Position: Midfielder

Team information
- Current team: Helenites

Youth career
- 2010–2019: Laraza FC

College career
Years	Team	Apps	(Gls)
2020–2022	SCC Blackhawks	32	(17)
2023–2024	Dalton State Roadrunners	16	(4)
2024–2026	Coastal Carolina Chanticleers	23	(0)

Senior career*
Years	Team	Apps	(Gls)
2022–2023	Houston FC	23	(0)
2026	Lionsbridge FC	6	(0)
2026	Helenites	0	(0)
2026	Virginia Atlantic	6	(1)

International career^{‡}
2018	United States Virgin Islands U20	2	(0)
2019–	United States Virgin Islands	25	(3)
- * Club domestic league appearances and goals as of 16:17, 29 June 2025 (UTC) ‡ National team caps and goals as of 12:58, 30 September 2026 (UTC)

Jimson St. Louis (born December 2, 2002) is a United States Virgin Islands international soccer player who plays as a midfielder for Helenites, and the United States Virgin Islands national team.

== Career ==
=== Youth ===
As a youth, St. Louis played for Laraza FC of the U.S. Virgin Islands Premier League for nine years. In 2019 St. Louis traveled to Spain with three other USVI youth players to trial with the academies of seven professional clubs.

=== College ===
For the 2020 campaign, St. Louis committed to play college soccer for the Blackhawks of Southeastern Community College. Following his time with the Blackhawks, he committed to joining the Coastal Carolina Chanticleers of NCAA Division 1 Coastal Carolina University for 2023 season. However, he eventually transferred and joined international teammate Joshua Ramos on the Dalton States Roadrunners.

=== Club ===
For the 2022 season, St. Louis joined Houston FC of the USL League Two. He made eight league appearances for the club during the season. The player remained with the club in 2023 as it moved to the UPSL Premier Division. He made fifteen appearances that season

Following his graduation from Coastal Carolina, St. Louis returned to USL League Two, signing with Lionsbridge FC for the 2026 season. He joined Helenites SC for the club's 2026 CFU Club Shield campaign. He scored in a quarter-final match against Puerto Rico's Metropolitan FA, but Helenites ultimately fell 1–2 and were eliminated from the competition.

St. Louis joined Virginia Atlantic of the National Premier Soccer League for the 2026 season. He scored in a 3–0 victory over DMV Elite FC.

== International career ==
St. Louis represented the USVI at the youth level in the 2018 CONCACAF U-20 Championship. He made his senior international debut on October 12, 2019, in a 2019–20 CONCACAF Nations League C match against Barbados.

=== International goals ===
Scores and results list USVI's goal tally first.

No	Date	Venue	Opponent	Score	Result	Competition
1.	7 September 2023	Bethlehem Soccer Stadium, Upper Bethlehem, U.S. Virgin Islands	Cayman Islands	2–1	2–2	2023–24 CONCACAF Nations League C
2.	25 March 2026	Juan Ramón Loubriel Stadium, Bayamón, Puerto Rico	American Samoa	5–2	5–2	2026 FIFA Series
3.	29 September 2026	Bethlehem Soccer Stadium, Upper Bethlehem, U.S. Virgin Islands	British Virgin Islands	1–0	3–1	2026–27 CONCACAF Nations League C
Last updated September 30, 2026

=== International statistics ===
As of match played September 29, 2026.

National team	Year	Apps	Goals
U.S. Virgin Islands	2019	4	0
U.S. Virgin Islands	2020	0	0
U.S. Virgin Islands	2021	5	0
U.S. Virgin Islands	2022	3	0
U.S. Virgin Islands	2023	4	1
U.S. Virgin Islands	2024	6	0
U.S. Virgin Islands	2025	0	0
U.S. Virgin Islands	2026	3	2
Total		24	3
