= Axel Bartsch =

U.S. Virgin Islands association footballer

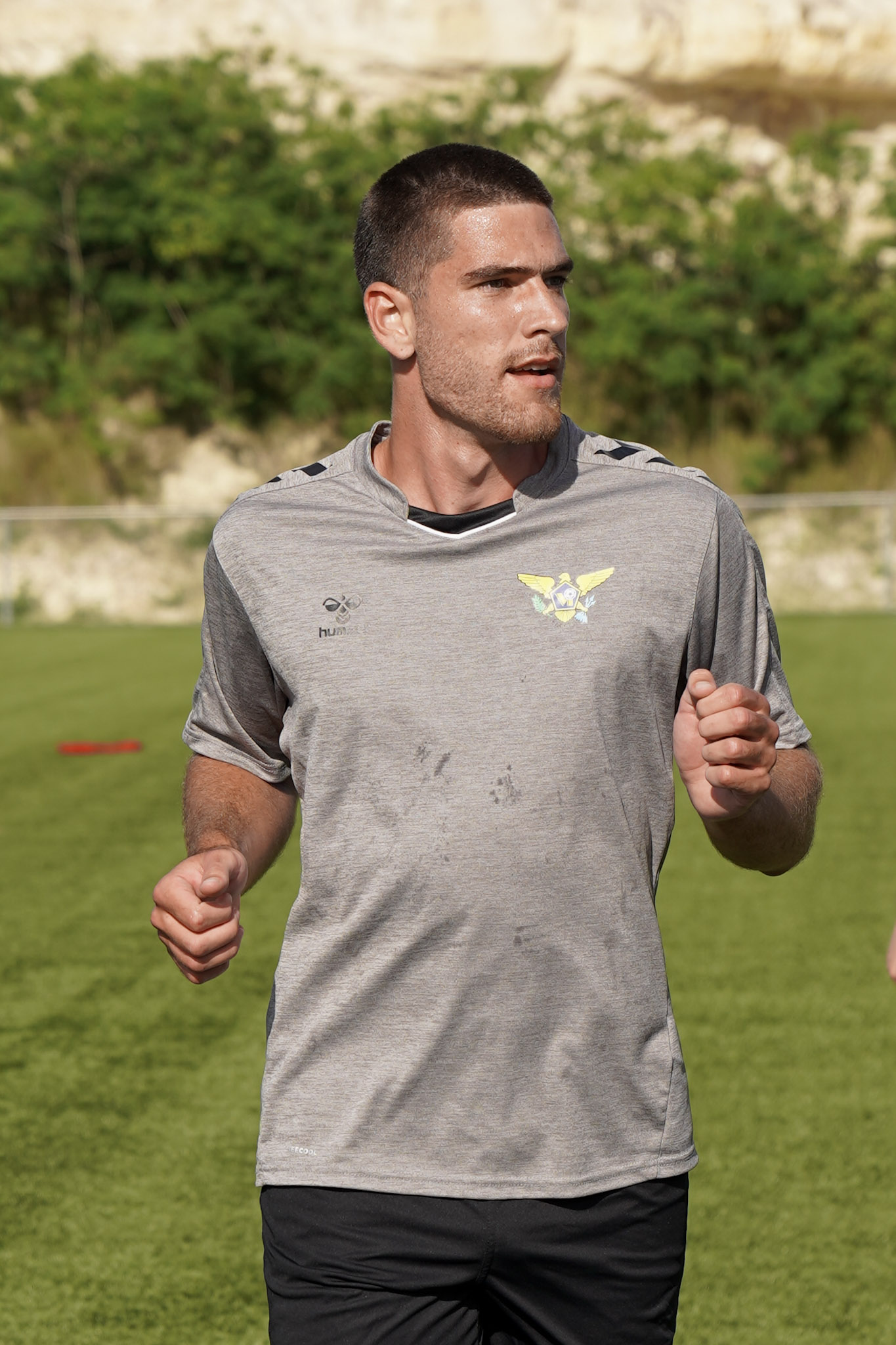
- Bartsch warming up before a match with the United States Virgin Islands in 2024

Personal information
- Date of birth: May 16, 2002 (age 24)
- Place of birth: United States Virgin Islands
- Height: 1.94 m (6 ft 4 in)
- Positions: Center-back; midfielder

Team information
- Current team: Castaways
- Number: 16

College career
Years	Team	Apps	(Gls)
2021	Occidental Tigers	6	(0)

Senior career*
Years	Team	Apps	(Gls)
2024–	Castaways		

International career^{‡}
2021–	United States Virgin Islands	8	(0)
- * Club domestic league appearances and goals as of 13:42, March 19, 2021 (UTC) ‡ National team caps and goals as of 13:42, March 19, 2021 (UTC)

Axel Bartsch (born May 16, 2002) is a United States Virgin Islands soccer who plays as a midfielder for Castaways Soccer Club in the USVISF Premier League and the United States Virgin Islands national team.

== Club career ==
Bartsch played for youth club 18.3 Massive FC and won the U.S. Virgin Islands Soccer Association's Under-15 Boys League with the team in 2018. He played for his school team, the Virgin Islands Montessori School Volts, and won back-to-back St. Thomas-St. John Interscholastic Athletic Association championships in 2017 and 2018.

By age 16 he was already competing in the U.S. Virgin Islands Premier League with New Vibes SC.

In late 2019 Bartsch was playing in the Occidental College intramural league while studying there. Following the resumption of college soccer during the COVID-19 pandemic, he became a member of the school's NCAA Division III squad. He went on to make six appearances for the team in his first season.

Following his time at Occidental College, Bartsch returned to the USVI and joined Castaways SC in the USVISF Premier League in 2024.

== International career ==
Bartsch represented the United States Virgin Islands at both the 2017 CONCACAF Boys' Under-15 Championship and in 2019 CONCACAF U-17 Championship qualifying.

Bartsch was named as part of the 23-man USVI roster ahead of a training camp in Florida in March 2021. He made his senior international debut for the territory on March 21 in a friendly against Anguilla which was part of the camp. Six days later he made his competitive debut in a 3–0 defeat to Antigua and Barbuda in the team's first match of 2022 FIFA World Cup qualification. He started and played the first 84 minutes of the match.

== Personal life ==
Bartsch graduated as salutatorian of the Virgin Islands Montessori School in 2019. He then enrolled at Occidental College in Los Angeles, California.

== Career statistics ==
As of match played March 29, 2021

Appearances and goals by national team and year
National team	Year	Apps	Goals
United States Virgin Islands	2021	3	0
United States Virgin Islands	2024	5	0
Total		8	0
