= USVISF President's Cup =

- Organiser(s): USVISF
- Founded: 2024
- Region: (United States Virgin Islands) U.S. Virgin Islands
- Teams: 8
- Current champions: New Vibes (2nd title)
- Most championships: New Vibes (2 titles)
- Website: Website

The USVISF President's Cup is the annual knockout association football tournament for clubs in the United States Virgin Islands. It is organized by the U.S. Virgin Islands Soccer Federation.

== History ==
In 2024, the USVI Soccer Federation announced the creation of the President's Cup as the territory's cup tournament. The first edition of the tournament was planned to be held later that year with clubs both in the USVISF Premier League and outside of the league being eligible. The 2024 cup would begin on March 16 with up to twelve clubs participating, up to nine of which would come from the Premier League. When the field was finalized, eight clubs participated in the inaugural tournament, all from the Premier League. Only Prankton SC declined to enter. New Vibes SC of Saint Thomas defeated Saint Croix's Rovers SC. Following a 3–3 deadlock at the end of regulation, New Vibes defeated Rovers 4–3 in the penalty shoot-out to become first-ever champions.

The 2025 edition of the tournament kicked off on May 31, 2025 with all eight Premier League clubs entering. New Vibes SC and Rovers SC advanced to the final for a rematch of the 2024 championship match. New Vibes took a 3–0 lead in the match, but Rovers scored two unanswered goals. Ultimately, New Vibes won 3–2 to secure back-to-back titles.

== Winners ==
Ed.	Season	Champion	Runner-up	Ref.
1	2024	New Vibes	Rovers	
2	2025	New Vibes	Rovers	
3	2026	Rovers	New Vibes	

== Performance by club ==
Club	Titles	Seasons won
New Vibes	2	2024, 2025
Rovers	1	2026
