= 2019–20 U.S. Virgin Islands Premier League =

U.S. Virgin Islands Premier League
- Season: 2019–20
- Dates: 19 January 2020 – 14 March 2020 (Note: The season was scheduled to begin on 14 November 2019 and conclude on 22 March 2020.)
- Matches: 26
- Goals: 131 (5.04 per match)
- Biggest home win: 9 goals: HEL 9–0 WTK (8 Mar 2020)
- Biggest away win: 13 goals: UNQ 2–15 LZA (9 Feb 2020)
- Highest scoring: 13 goals: UNQ 2–15 LZA (9 Feb 2020)

The 2019–20 U.S. Virgin Islands Premier League was the second season of the U.S. Virgin Islands Premier League, and the 16th season of the U.S. Virgin Islands Soccer Championship, the top division soccer competition in the United States Virgin Islands. The season was scheduled to begin on 10 November 2019 and was scheduled to end on 22 March 2020. However, the start of the season was delayed to 19 January 2020, and the league was suspended on 14 March 2020 due to the COVID-19 pandemic.

On 15 July 2020, the season was declared abandoned.

== Table ==
1.Helenites               6   5  1  0  32- 9  16  [C]  [Saint Croix]
2.Laraza                  6   5  0  1  30- 7  15       [Saint Thomas]
3.Raymix                  6   3  1  2  18-12  10       [Saint Thomas]
4.Rovers                  7   3  1  3  14-12  10       [Saint Croix]
5.New Vibes               6   2  1  3   8- 7   7       [Saint Thomas]
6.Prankton                6   2  0  4  12-18   6       [Saint Croix]
7.United We Stand         2   1  1  0   2- 1   4       [Saint Thomas]
8.Unique                  7   1  1  5   9-36   4       [Saint Croix]
9.Waitikubuli             6   1  0  5   6-29   3       [Saint Thomas]
