= MacDonald Taylor =

MacDonald Taylor may refer to:

- MacDonald Taylor Sr., US Virgin Islands international soccer player, father
- MacDonald Taylor Jr., US Virgin Islands international soccer player, son
