= USVISF St. Thomas Technical Center =

- Interactive map of USVISF St. Thomas Technical Center
- Location: Red Hook, U.S. Virgin Islands
- Coordinates: 18.3268°N 64.8505°W
- Surface: Artificial turf

Construction
- Cost: $5-7 million USD
- Architect: Jeffery Boschulte

Tenants
- USVISF Premier League; US Virgin Islands national football team

The USVISF St. Thomas Technical Center is a planned association football stadium to be built on Saint Thomas, United States Virgin Islands.

== History ==
In November 2024, the USVI Committee on Budget, Appropriations, and Finance voted in favor of allowing the construction of a soccer stadium on a 5-acre plot of land in Red Hook. The stadium was expected to cost between $5-7 million USD which was already approved by FIFA. Construction was expected to be a three to five-year project to be completed in phases. The initial priority would be construction of the pitch, allowing matches to be played at the venue while the rest of the project continued. Construction of the stadium was expected to begin soon thereafter, with re-zoning needing to be approved first. By May 2025, the US Virgin Islands Soccer Federation had signed a 50-year lease on the property.

By the time FIFA president Gianni Infantino visited Saint Thomas in June 2025, planning for the creation of a soccer stadium on the island, similar to the Bethlehem Soccer Stadium on Saint Croix, was already well underway with Infantino reaffirming FIFA's support of the project. In September 2026, construction cleared the final regulatory hurdle, approval by the Virgin Islands Coastal Zone Management Commission. Bids for the first phase of construction were expected to be tendered in January 2027 with this phase of the project initially including the FIFA regulation playing field and parking lot.
