= Jamie Browne =

United States Virgin Islands soccer player

Personal information
- Date of birth: 3 July 1989 (age 37)
- Place of birth: US Virgin Islands
- Height: 1.70 m (5 ft 7 in)
- Position: Midfielder

Team information
- Current team: Dallas City

Senior career*
| Years | Team | Apps | (Gls) |
| 2009-2013 | UWS Upsetters | | |
| 2014 | Brooklyn Knights | | |
| 2013-2015 | UWS Upsetters | | |
| 2016-2018 | Dallas City FC | | |
| 2019- | United We Stand SC | | |

International career^{‡}
| 2006– | US Virgin Islands | 12 | (3) |
- * Club domestic league appearances and goals ‡ National team caps and goals as of 22:09, 16 August 2025 (UTC)

Jamie Browne (born 3 July 1989) is a US Virgin Islands soccer player who notably was a midfielder for Dallas City. His current team is United We Stand.

He is considered as the best United States Virgin Islands soccer players ever. He is also tied with as their top goalscorer along J. C. Mack.

== Career ==
Browne made his first appearance on the senior national team on September 27, 2006, at the young age of 17. Browne scored his first international professional goal against Antigua and Barbuda in an 8–1 defeat on September 6, 2011 in 2014 World Cup qualification group stage. Browne scored against Barbados during qualification for the 2018 FIFA world cup in Russia.

== International goals ==
Scores and results list United States Virgin Islands' goal tally first.

| No. | Date | Venue | Opponent | Score | Result | Competition |
|---|---|---|---|---|---|---|
| 1. | 6 September 2011 | Paul E. Joseph Stadium, Frederiksted, U.S. Virgin Islands | Antigua and Barbuda | 1–3 | 1–8 | 2014 FIFA World Cup qualification |
| 2. | 22 March 2015 | Barbados National Stadium, Bridgetown, Barbados | Barbados | 1–0 | 1–0 | 2018 FIFA World Cup qualification |
| 3. | 6 June 2022 | Bethlehem Soccer Stadium, Upper Bethlehem, U.S. Virgin Islands | Turks and Caicos Islands | 1–0 | 3–2 | 2022–23 CONCACAF Nations League C |

== See also ==
- List of top international men's football goalscorers by country
