= Massey SA =

- Full name: Massey Soccer Academy
- Ground: Ivanna Eudora Kean High School Field
- Manager: Dale Richards
- League: USVISF Premier League
- 2024: 4th, Saint Thomas Division
- Website: Official Website

The Massey Soccer Academy is a soccer club based in Saint Thomas, United States Virgin Islands. The club competes in the USVISF Premier League, the top tier of soccer in the United States Virgin Islands.

== Domestic history ==
Key

Champion Runners-up 3rd Place

Season	League								Notes
Season	Div.	Pos.	Pl.	W	D	L	P	Playoffs	Notes
2024	USVISF Premier League (St. Thomas Division)	4th	13	3	0	10	9	DNQ	
2025	USVISF Premier League (St. Thomas Division)	4th	6	1	1	4	4	DNQ	
