= MacDonald Taylor Jr. =

United States Virgin Islands soccer player (born 1992)

Personal information
- Date of birth: March 22, 1992 (age 34)
- Place of birth: Christiansted, U.S. Virgin Islands
- Height: 1.85 m (6 ft 1 in)
- Position: Midfielder

Youth career
- 2007–2010: Skills FC

College career
Years	Team	Apps	(Gls)
2010–2013	Seton Hill Griffins	41	(8)

International career^{‡}
- U.S. Virgin Islands U17
- U.S. Virgin Islands U20
- U.S. Virgin Islands U23
2006–	U.S. Virgin Islands	19	(1)
- ‡ National team caps and goals as of March 23, 2023

MacDonald Taylor Jr. (born March 22, 1992) is a United States Virgin Islands international soccer player who plays as a midfielder.

== Career ==
Taylor has played for Skills FC and Seton Hill University.

He made his international debut for United States Virgin Islands in 2006, and has appeared in FIFA World Cup qualifying matches.

=== International goals ===
Scores and results list United States Virgin Islands' goal tally first.

No	Date	Venue	Opponent	Score	Result	Competition
1.	1 June 2014	Blakes Estate Stadium, Lookout, Montserrat	Bonaire	1–2	1–2	2014 Caribbean Cup qualification

== Personal life ==
His father is MacDonald Taylor Sr.
