= Tonina Dimech =

Maltese footballer (born 1960)

Personal information
- Date of birth: 22 December 1960 (age 65)
- Height: 1.60 m (5 ft 3 in)
- Position: Goalkeeper

Team information
- Current team: Birkirkara
- Number: 12

Senior career*
Years	Team	Apps	(Gls)
2001–2002	Melita FC	16	(0)
2002–	Birkirkara	148	(0)

International career^{‡}
2003–2010	Malta	8	(0)
- * Club domestic league appearances and goals as of 18 February 2020 ‡ National team caps and goals as of 24 June 2010

Tonina "Nina" Dimech (born 22 December 1960) is a Maltese footballer who plays as a goalkeeper for First Division club Birkirkara FC. She has played for the Malta women's national team.

Dimech last capped for Malta at senior level during the 2011 FIFA Women's World Cup qualification – UEFA Group 5 in a 1–5 away loss to Turkey on 11 April 2010, at 49 years, 3 months and 20 days old. She surpassed MacDonald Taylor Sr. as the oldest player (both genders) to appear in a FIFA World Cup qualifying match.

Dimech's most recent league appearance was on 18 February 2020, at 59 years, 1 month and 28 days old.
