= MacDonald Taylor Sr. =

United States Virgin Islands soccer player (born 1957)

Personal information
- Date of birth: 27 August 1957 (age 69)
- Place of birth: Trinidad and Tobago
- Position: Defender

Senior career*
Years	Team	Apps	(Gls)
2004–2006	Chelsea United SC		

International career
2000–2004	United States Virgin Islands	4	(0)
- * Club domestic league appearances and goals

MacDonald Taylor Sr. (born 27 August 1957) is a United States Virgin Islands former international soccer player.

== Career ==
Taylor appeared in four FIFA World Cup qualifying matches for United States Virgin Islands between 2000 and 2004. After playing against Saint Kitts and Nevis in March 2004 at 46, Taylor became the oldest player to appear in a FIFA World Cup qualifying match. He still holds this record for men's football, but has been surpassed in both genders by women's goalkeeper Tonina Dimech who played the 2011 Women's World Cup Qualifiers for Malta in 2010 at 49.

== Personal life ==
His son is MacDonald Taylor Jr.
