= Soccer in the United States Virgin Islands =

The sport of soccer (association football) in the United States Virgin Islands is run by the U.S. Virgin Islands Soccer Federation. The association administers the national soccer team, as well as the U.S. Virgin Islands Championship.

== League system ==
| Level | League(s)/Division(s) | |
| 1 | St. Croix Soccer League; 7 teams or clubs (2 qualify for the Final U.S. Virgin Islands Championship) | St. Thomas League; 8 teams or clubs (2 qualify for the Final U.S. Virgin Islands Championship) |
