= Skills FC =

- Full name: Skills Football Club
- League: St. Croix Soccer League
- 2013–14: 3rd

Skills FC is a soccer club based in the U.S. Virgin Islands. The team competes in the St. Croix Soccer League.

== Honors ==
- St. Croix Soccer League:
  - Runners-up (1): 2008–09
