= Lionel Roberts Stadium =

Stadium in Saint Thomas, US Virgin Islands

Coordinates: 18°20′40.66″N 64°55′39.16″W

Lionel Roberts Park
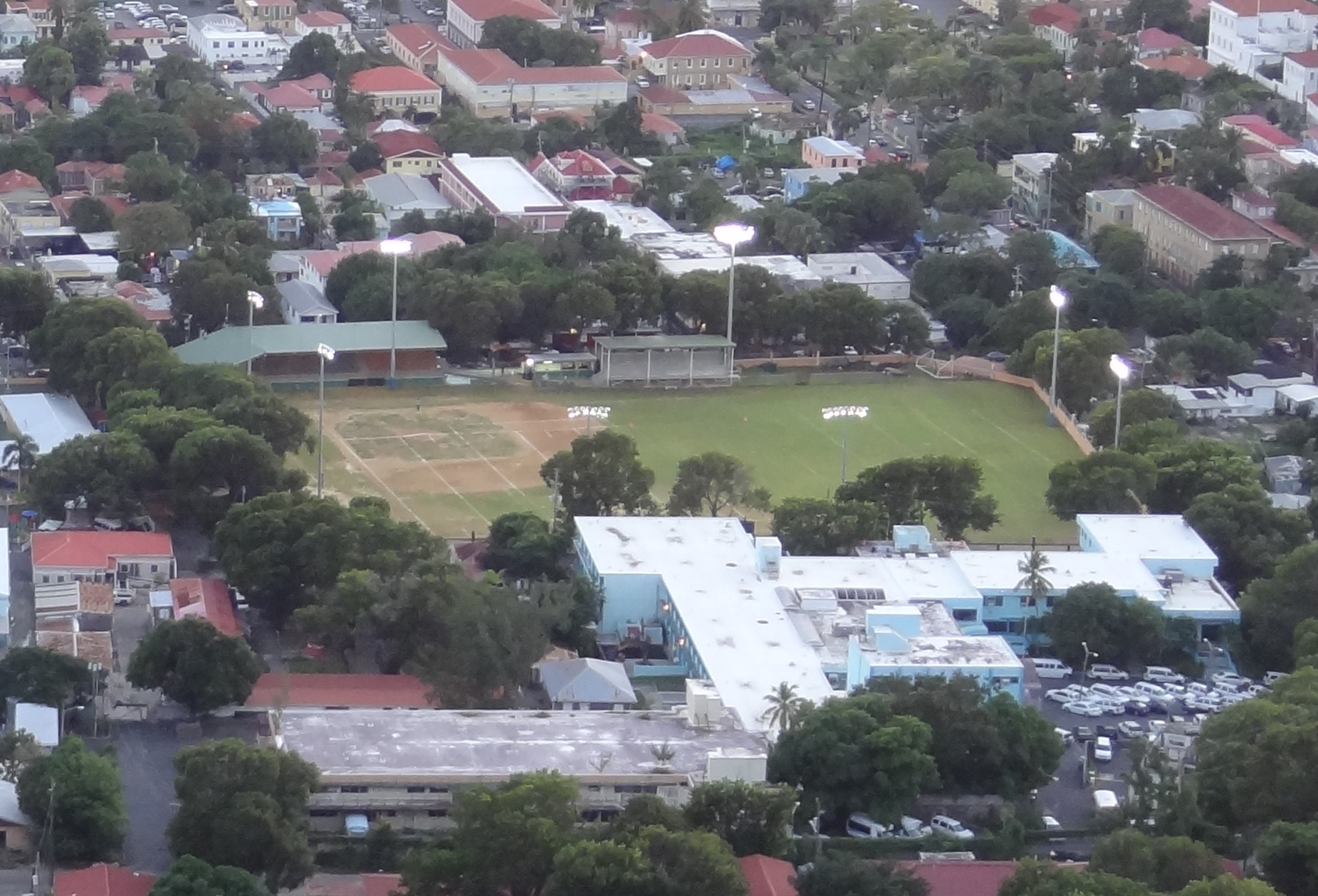
- Location: Charlotte Amalie, Saint Thomas, United States Virgin Islands
- Capacity: 5,000

Tenants
- US Virgin Islands national soccer team New Vibes

Lionel Roberts Stadium is a multi-use stadium in Charlotte Amalie, United States Virgin Islands. It is currently used mostly for soccer matches, as well as baseball and American football. The stadium holds 5,000.
