= St. Croix Soccer League =

The St. Croix Soccer League is a former regional soccer championship played in Saint Croix, United States Virgin Islands. The two best teams of the championship qualified to US Virgin Islands Championship.

== Clubs 2012/13 ==
- Chelsea
- Free Will Baptist
- Helenites
- Prankton United
- Rovers
- Skills
- Unique FC

== Previous winners ==
- 1968/69: Hess Oil Company
- 1969/92: unknown
- 1992/93: Rovers SC
- 1993/94: unknown
- 1994/95: Rovers SC
- 1995/96: Rovers SC
- 1997/98: Helenites (Groveplace)
- 1998/99: Unique FC (Christiansted)
- 1999/00: Helenites (Groveplace)
- 2000/01: Helenites (Groveplace) (or not held?)
- 2001/02: Helenites (Groveplace)
- 2002/03: Helenites (Groveplace)
- 2003/04: Helenites (Groveplace)
- 2004/05: Helenites (Groveplace)
- 2005/06: Helenites (Groveplace)
- 2006/07: Helenites (Groveplace)
- 2007/08: Helenites (Groveplace)
- 2008/09: Helenites (Groveplace)
- 2009/10: Unique FC (Christiansted)
- 2010/11: Helenites (Groveplace)
- 2011/12: Helenites (Groveplace)
- 2012/13: Rovers
- 2013/14: Helenites (Groveplace)
- 2014/15: Helenites (Groveplace)
- 2015/16: Helenites (Groveplace)
- 2016/17: Helenites (Groveplace)
