= Houston FC =

- Full name: Houston Football Club
- Founded: December 16, 2016; 9 years ago
- Stadium: Sorrels Field
- Capacity: 1,000
- Owner: Bruce Talbot
- President: Duncan Green
- Head Coach: Bruce Talbot
- League: USL League Two
- 2026: 6th, Lone Star Division; Playoffs: DNQ
- Website: houstonfctx.com
Home colours	Away colours

Houston FC is an American pre-professional soccer club based in Houston, founded in 2016 by Bruce Talbot. Head coach Bruce Talbot played collegiately for the North Carolina Tar Heels, and has experience coaching at the University of North Carolina at Chapel Hill, as well as at Clemson University. The team began as a youth team competing in the Super Y-League. Its second year Houston FC started a senior team that currently competes in USL League Two. Then in 2022, the team expanded and began competing in the United Premier Soccer League

== Year-by-year ==
Year	Division	League	Regular season	Playoffs	Open Cup
2017	4	USL PDL	6th, Mid South	did not enter	did not qualify
2018	4	USL PDL	7th, Mid South	did not qualify	did not qualify
2019	4	USL League Two	6th, Mid South	did not qualify	did not qualify
2020	4	USL League Two	Season cancelled due to COVID-19 pandemic		
2021	4	USL League Two	6th, Mid South	did not qualify	did not qualify
2022	4	USL League Two	2nd, Lone Star	did not qualify	did not qualify
2023	4	USL League Two	5th, Lone Star	did not qualify	did not qualify
2024	4	USL League Two	4th, Lone Star	did not qualify	did not qualify
2025	4	USL League Two	5th, Lone Star	did not qualify	did not qualify
2026	4	USL League Two	6th, Lone Star	did not qualify	did not qualify

== Notable Achievements ==
In 2019 as a 3 year old club 9 players from the team committed to play college soccer as covered in a new section done by ABC13 Houston. In 2020 Houston FC fought their way into the first round of U.S. Open Cup qualifiers coming back from a 3-0 deficit then losing in penalties. In the 2023 USL League Two season, central midfielder Clancey Skea made it into the final round of voting for the "League Two Young Player of the Year Award". In 2025 long time Houston FC goalkeeper Daniel Namani signed with USL Championship side San Antonio FC. Also in 2025, Houston FC won the United Premier Soccer League Texas South conference with a 7-1-2 record, going undefeated away.

== Gallery ==
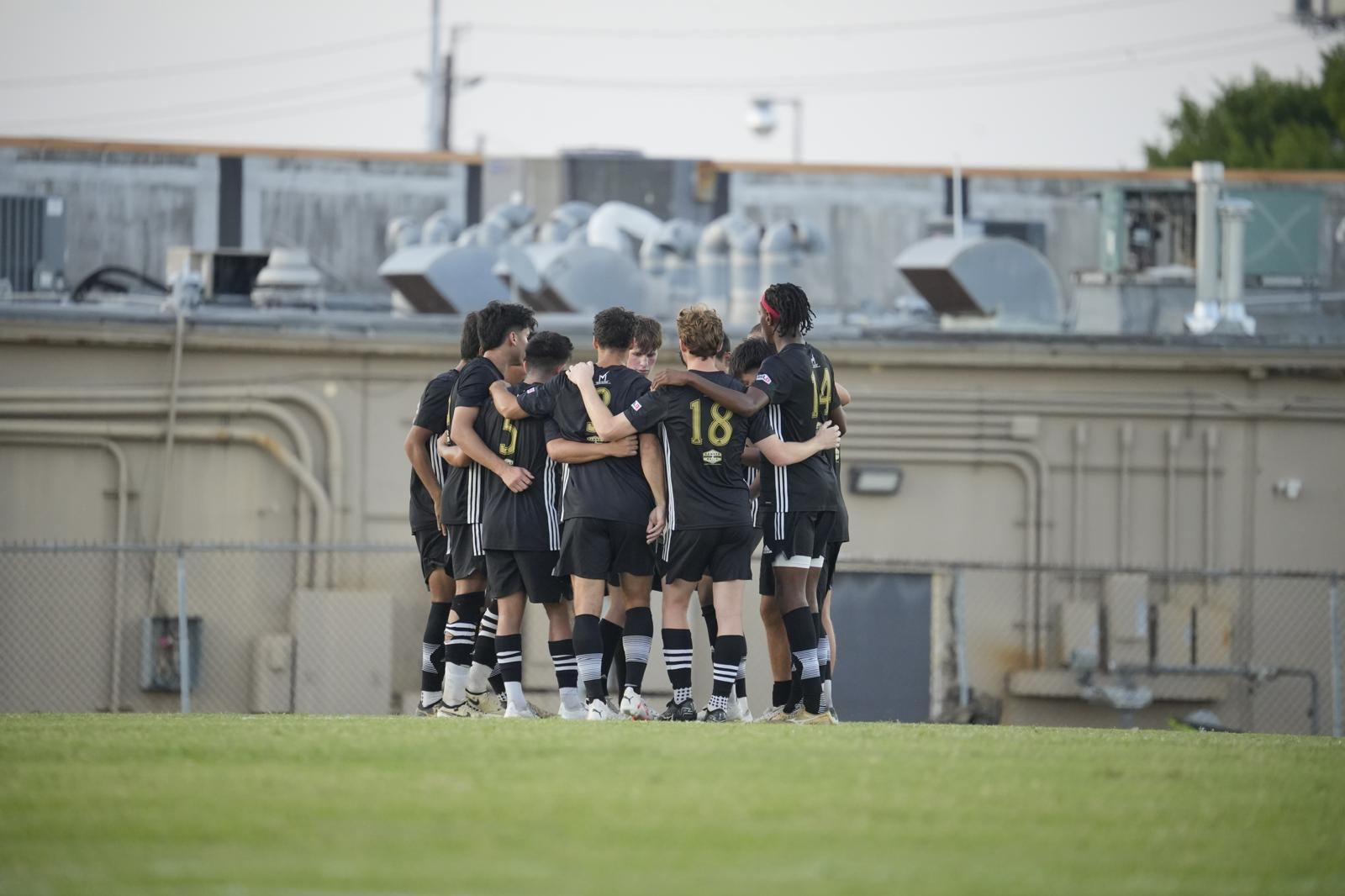
Halftime huddle

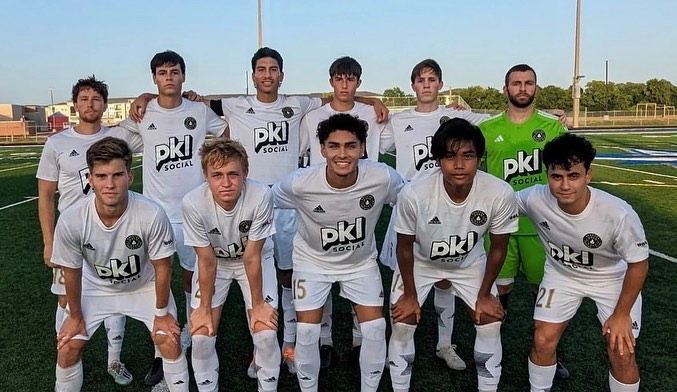
Lineup vs El Sur

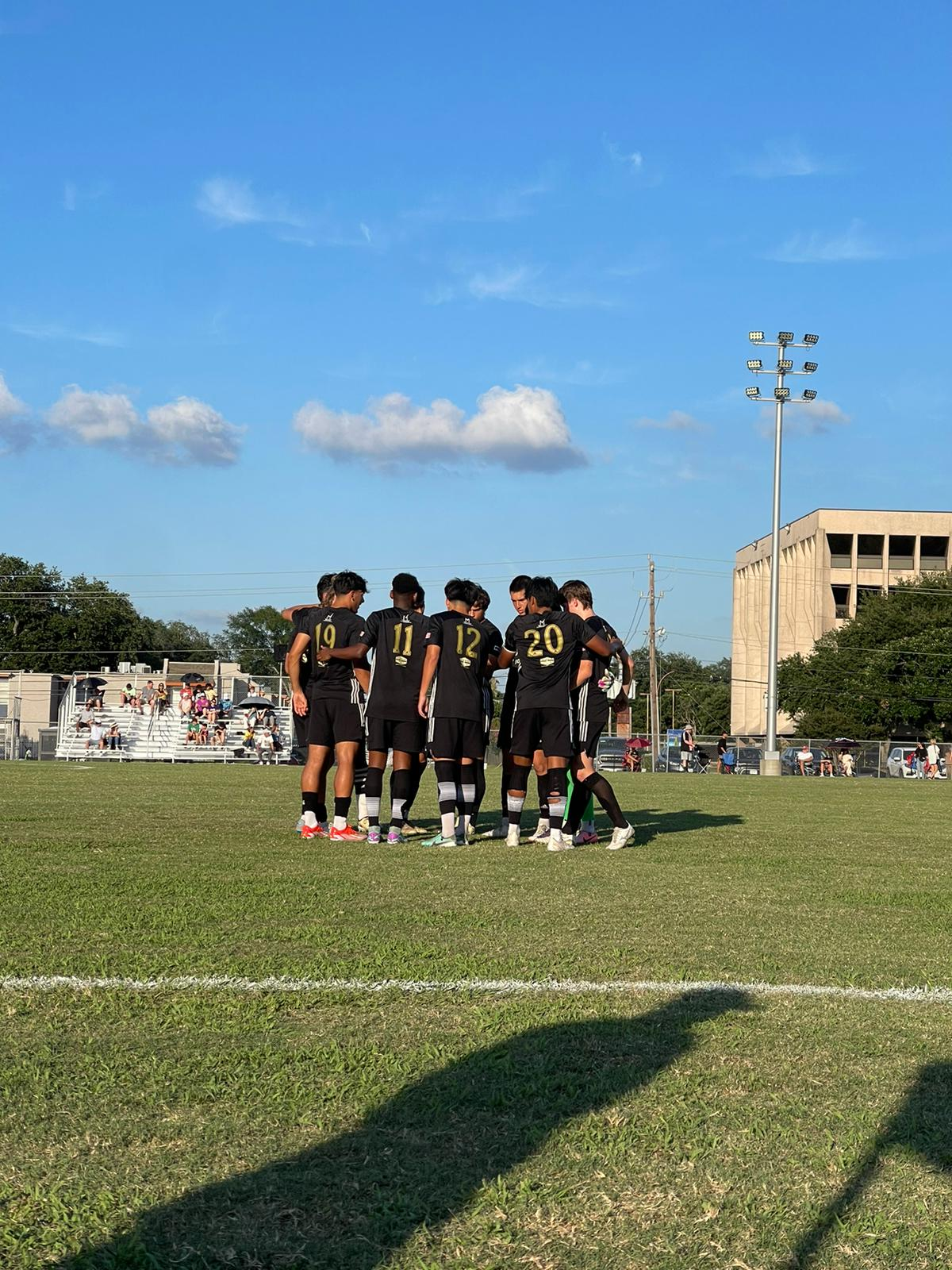
Pre-game huddle

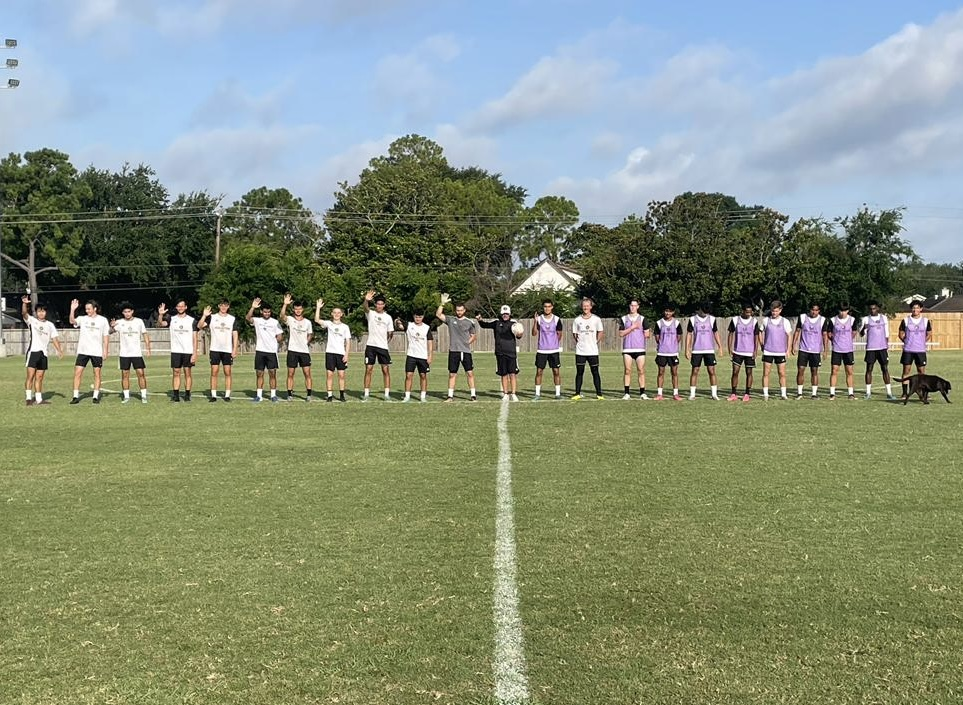
Practice scrimmage

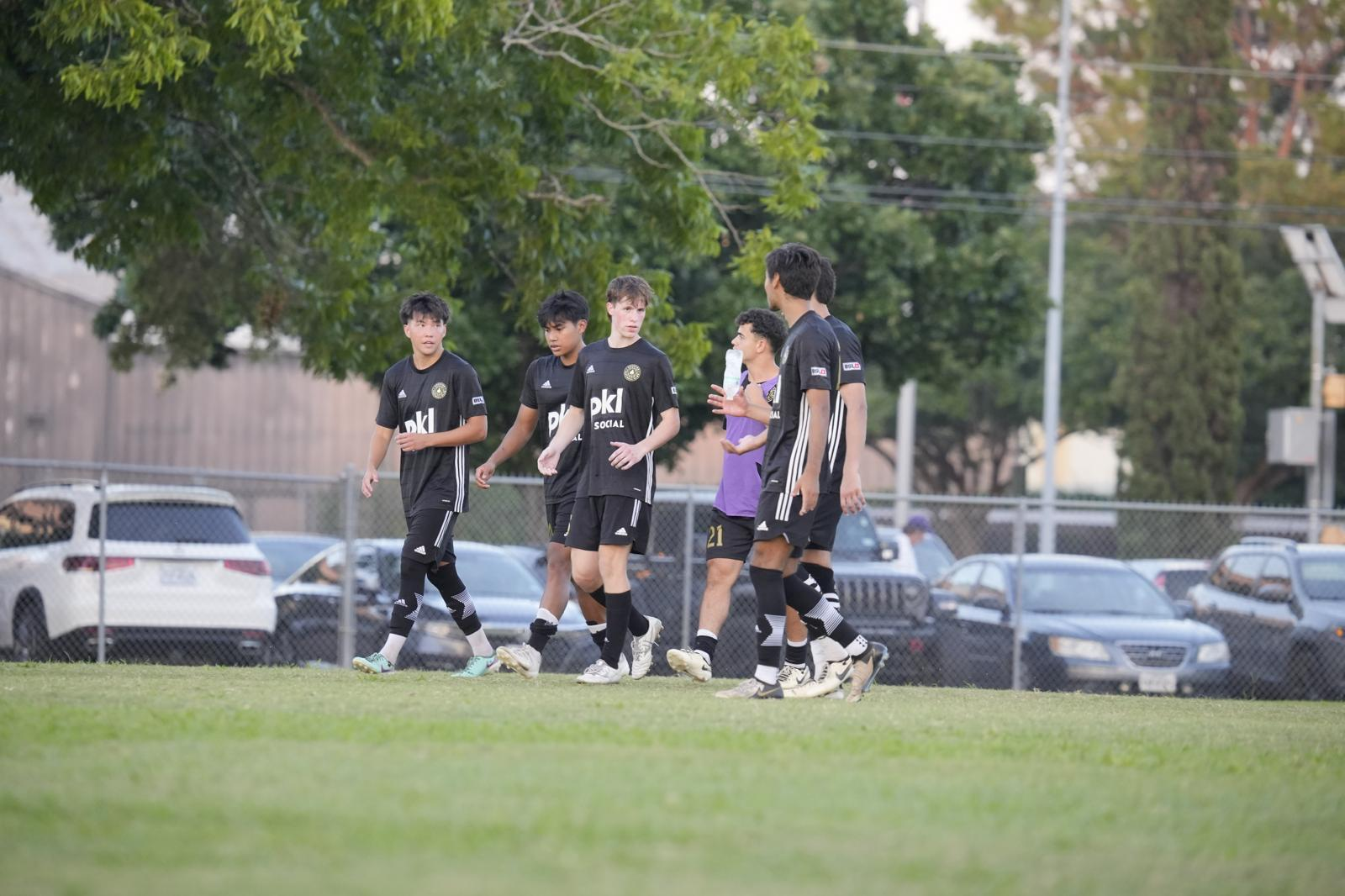
Halftime walkout
