= St. Thomas League =

Regional soccer championship in Saint Thomas and Saint John

The St. Thomas & St. John League is a former regional soccer championship played in Saint Thomas and Saint John, United States Virgin Islands. The two best teams of the championship qualified to US Virgin Islands Championship.

== Clubs 2012/13 ==
- HT Victory
- Laraza
- New Vibes
- Positive Vibes
- Raymix
- Togetherness
- UWS Upsetters SC
- Waitikubuli

== Previous winners ==
- 1995/96: MI Roc Masters
- 1996/97: Saint John United SC (Cruz Bay)
- 1997/98: MI Roc Masters
- 1998/99: MI Roc Masters
- 1999/00: UWS Upsetters SC
- 2000/01: UWS Upsetters SC
- 2001/02: Waitikubuli United SC
- 2002/03: Waitikubuli United SC
- 2003/04: not known (not Positive Vibes)
- 2004/05: Positive Vibes
- 2005/06: Positive Vibes
- 2006/07: Positive Vibes
- 2007/08: Positive Vibes
- 2008/09: New Vibes
- 2009/10: Positive Vibes
- 2010/11: apparently not held
- 2011/12: New Vibes
- 2012/13: Positive Vibes
- 2013/14: Positive Vibes
- 2014/15: Raymix
- 2015/16: Raymix
- 2016/17: Raymix

== Top goalscorers ==
Year	Best scorers	Team	Goals
2008-09	(Saint Kitts and Nevis) Keithroy Saddler	Positive Vibes	32
2009-10	(Saint Vincent and the Grenadines) Amon Bascombe	Positive Vibes	

=== Multiple hat-tricks ===
Rank	Country	Player	Hat-tricks
1	(Saint Vincent and the Grenadines)	Amon Bascome	2
1		Alexis Sandler	2
1		Marlon Witton	2
4		Trevor Antoine	1
4		Brian Charlery	1
4		Alvin Joseph	1
4	(United States Virgin Islands)	Marvin Mack	1
4		Franklin Victor	1
