= United We Stand SC =

- Full name: United We Stand SC
- Nickname: UWS
- Founded: 1999
- Stadium: Lionel Roberts Stadium, Charlotte Amalie, U.S. Virgin Islands
- Capacity: 5,000
- League: U.S. Virgin Islands Association Club Championship
- 2022–23: 2nd

United We Stand SC is a U.S. Virgin Islands professional soccer club that competes in the U.S. Virgin Islands Association Club Championship.

== History ==
The team was originally branded as the UWS Upsetters.

== Honours ==
- U.S. Virgin Islands Association Club Championship
  - Champions (1): 1999–00
  - Runners-up (3): 2001–02, 2018–19, 2022–23
- St. Thomas League
  - Champions (2): 1999–00, 2000–01
