= USVISF Premier League =

- Founded: 1997
- Country: (United States Virgin Islands) US Virgin Islands
- Confederation: CONCACAF
- Number of clubs: 8
- Level on pyramid: 1
- Relegation to: None
- Domestic cup: President's Cup
- International cup(s): CFU Club Shield; CONCACAF Caribbean Cup
- Current champions: Helenites SC (2025)
- Most championships: Helenites SC (6)
- Current: 2026 USVISF Premier League season

The USVISF Premier League is the top soccer club competition in the U.S. Virgin Islands. The league is divided into the Saint Croix Division and Saint Thomas Division. The league champion is decided in a knockout tournament between the best two teams of each division. The winner of the league qualifies to participate in the CFU Club Shield which doubles as qualification for the CONCACAF Caribbean Cup.

== 2025 clubs ==
=== Saint Croix Division ===
- CAPA
- Helenites SC
- Prankton SC
- Rovers SC

=== Saint Thomas Division ===
- Castaways SC
- Massey SA
- New Vibes SC
- Raymix SC

== Venues ==
As of the 2024 USVISF Premier League season, all league matches are played at neutral venues. Clubs in the Saint Thomas Division play matches at the Ivanna Eudora Kean High School Stadium while Saint Croix Division matches are played at the Bethlehem Soccer Stadium. In 2024, the USVISF and FIFA announced the construction of the Nazareth Soccer Stadium which would serve as the main venue on Saint Thomas when complete.

USVISF Premier League is located in the U.S. Virgin Islands	Saint Croix	USVISF Premier League is located in the U.S. Virgin Islands	Saint Thomas
USVISF Premier League is located in the U.S. Virgin Islands	Bethlehem Soccer Stadium	USVISF Premier League is located in the U.S. Virgin Islands	Ivanna Eudora Kean High School Stadium
USVISF Premier League is located in the U.S. Virgin Islands	Capacity: 1,200	USVISF Premier League is located in the U.S. Virgin Islands	Capacity: 2,000

== Champions ==
=== Soccer Championship ===
Ed.	Season	Champion	Runner-up
–	1997–98	not played	
1	1998–99	M.I. Roc Masters	Helenites
2	1999–00	UWS Upsetters	Helenites
–	2000–01	not played	
3	2001–02	Haitian Stars	UWS Upsetters
–	2002–03	not played	
–	2003–04	not played	
4	2004–05	Positive Vibes	Helenites
5	2005–06	New Vibes	Positive Vibes
6	2006–07	Helenites	Positive Vibes
7	2007–08	Positive Vibes	New Vibes
8	2008–09	New Vibes	Positive Vibes
–	2009–10	not played	
–	2010–11	not played	
9	2011–12	Helenites	New Vibes
10	2012–13	New Vibes	Positive Vibes
11	2013–14	Helenites	Positive Vibes
12	2014–15	Helenites	Raymix
13	2015–16	Raymix	Helenites
14	2016–17	Raymix	Helenites
–	2017–18	not played	

=== Premier League ===
Ed.	Season	Champion	Runner-up
15	2018–19	Helenites	United We Stand
16	2019–20	abandoned due to the COVID-19 pandemic.	
–	2020–21	not played	

=== Association Club Championship ===
Ed.	Season	Champion	Runner-up
17	2022–23	New Vibes	United We Stand

=== USVISF Premier League ===
Ed.	Season	Champion	Runner-up
18	2024	Rovers	Helenites
19	2025	Helenites	Raymix
20	2026		

== Performance by club ==
Club	Titles	Seasons won
Helenites	6	2006–07, 2011–12, 2013–14, 2014–15, 2018–19 2025-26
New Vibes	4	2005–06, 2008–09, 2012–13, 2022–23
Positive Vibes	2	2004–05, 2007–08
Raymix	2	2015–16, 2016–17
Haitian Stars	1	2001–02
M.I. Roc Masters	1	1998–99
UWS Upsetters	1	1999–00
Rovers	1	2024

== USVI clubs in international competition ==
Below is a list of appearances by clubs from the USVI top-flight league in international competitions.

Club	Competition	Round	Opponent	Score
Positive Vibes Victory	2005 CFU Club Championship	First Round	(Saint Lucia) Northern United All Stars	2–0
Positive Vibes Victory	2005 CFU Club Championship	First Round	(Saint Lucia) Northern United All Stars	0–5
Positive Vibes Victory	2006 CFU Club Championship	First Round	(Netherlands Antilles) Barber	0–2
Positive Vibes Victory	2006 CFU Club Championship	First Round	(Jamaica) Harbour View	0–5
Positive Vibes Victory	2006 CFU Club Championship	First Round	(Haiti) Aigle Noir	3–2
New Vibes SC	2006 CFU Club Championship	First Round		
New Vibes SC	2006 CFU Club Championship	First Round	(Aruba) Britannia	1–1
New Vibes SC	2006 CFU Club Championship	First Round	(Antigua and Barbuda) SAP	1–3
New Vibes SC	2006 CFU Club Championship	First Round	(Trinidad and Tobago) San Juan Jabloteh	0–5
Helenites SC	2007 CFU Club Championship	First Round	(Jamaica) Portmore United	0–2
Helenites SC	2007 CFU Club Championship	First Round	(Suriname) Leo Victor	0–4
Helenites SC	2015 CFU Club Championship	First Round	(Guadeloupe) USR	2–2
Helenites SC	2015 CFU Club Championship	First Round	(Haiti) Don Bosco	1–5
Helenites SC	2015 CFU Club Championship	First Round	(The Bahamas) Lyford Cay Dragons	0–1
Rovers SC	2025 CFU Club Shield	Group Stage	(Puerto Rico) Academia Quintana	0–5
Rovers SC	2025 CFU Club Shield	Group Stage	(Turks and Caicos Islands) Academy Eagles	0–5
Helenites SC	2026 CFU Club Shield	First Round	(Saint Kitts and Nevis) St. Paul's United	3–0
Helenites SC	2026 CFU Club Shield	Round of 16	(Haiti) Baltimore	w/o
Helenites SC	2026 CFU Club Shield	Quarter-finals	(Puerto Rico) Metropolitan	1–2

== Top goalscorers ==
Season	Player	Team	Goals
2025	(Jamaica) Trevon Thorpe		16

== Women's League ==
=== Top goalscorers ===
Season	Player	Team	Goals
2023	(United States Virgin Islands) Mackiest Taylor	Lady R.	13
2024	(United States Virgin Islands) Mackiest Taylor	Lady R.	17
