= Upper Bethlehem, U.S. Virgin Islands =

Coordinates: 17°42′56″N 64°47′32″W

Upper Bethlehem, United States Virgin Islands
- Village
- Interactive map of Upper Bethlehem, United States Virgin Islands
- Country: United States Virgin Islands
- Island: Saint Croix
- Time zone: UTC-4 (AST)

Upper Bethlehem is a settlement on the island of Saint Croix in the United States Virgin Islands.
