= U.S. Virgin Islands Soccer Federation =

Governing body of soccer in the U.S. Virgin Islands

CONCACAF
- Short name: USVISF
- Founded: 1987 (as USVISF: 1992)
- Headquarters: 23-1 Bethlehem; P.O. Box 2346; Christiansted, Saint Croix 00851; U.S. Virgin Islands
- FIFA affiliation: 1998
- CONCACAF affiliation: 1998
- President: Yohannes Worede
- Website: www.usvisf.com

The U.S. Virgin Islands Soccer Federation is the governing body of soccer in the United States Virgin Islands. The U.S. Virgin Islands Soccer Federation, or the USVISF controls the U.S. Virgin Islands Soccer Federation Premier League. The annual Premier League is preceded by the U.S. Virgin Islands Soccer Federation President's Cup, an annual knockout tournament, and completed with the U.S. Virgin Islands Soccer Federation's “Big 4” Competition, an annual end of league competition that pits the top 2 teams from each region in the Premier League against each other to determine the top team in the territory.

The Federation was founded in 1987. It became affiliated with FIFA and CONCACAF in 1998. The Federation's headquarters are located in Christiansted on Saint Croix island.

== Federation staff ==
Name	Position	Source
(United States Virgin Islands) Yohanes Worede	President	
(United States Virgin Islands) Coral Meghay	Vice President	
(United States Virgin Islands) John de Jongh III	2nd Vice President	
(United States Virgin Islands) Firas Idheileh	General Secretary	
(United States Virgin Islands) Lance Chadron	Media And Communication Manager	
(United States Virgin Islands) Anthony Suarez	Technical Director	
(United States Virgin Islands) Terrance Jones	Team Coach (Men's)	
(United States) Stephan De Four	Team Coach (Women's)	
(United States Virgin Islands) n/a	Futsal Coordinator	
(United States) Somere Webber	Head/Director of the Referees Department	
(United States) Somere Webber	Referee Coordinator	
