= Bethlehem Soccer Stadium =

Football stadium in St. Croix, US

- Interactive map of Bethlehem Soccer Stadium
- Location: 23-1 Estate Bethlehem; Upper Bethlehem, St. Croix, U.S. Virgin Islands
- Coordinates: 17.7304°N 64.7860°W
- Capacity: 1,200
- Surface: Artificial turf

Construction
- Groundbreaking: 2017
- Opened: August 11, 2019

Tenant
- US Virgin Islands national football team

The Bethlehem Soccer Stadium is an association football stadium in Upper Bethlehem, St. Croix, United States Virgin Islands. The stadium is home to the US Virgin Islands national football team while the larger complex also includes the offices and technical center of the U.S. Virgin Islands Soccer Federation.

The stadium can accommodate 1,200 total seated spectators on two grandstands. It is the territory’s first soccer-specific stadium and was funded fully by FIFA.

== History ==
The transition of the U.S. Virgin Islands Soccer Federation offices to Bethlehem Estate began with FIFA Goal Project funding in 2015. Construction of the technical center was scheduled to begin the following year and on the national stadium in 2017. The stadium was to be constructed to address a lack of footballing infrastructure and a proper national stadium.

The stadium was officially opened on August 11, 2019 with a ceremony that included guests such as FIFA President Gianni Infantino and CONCACAF President Victor Montagliani. However, the stadium was already in use as the USVI olympic team hosted its qualifying matches for the 2020 Summer Olympics the previous month.

The stadium hosted the senior men's national team for the first time on September 5, 2019 for a 2019–20 CONCACAF Nations League C match against the Cayman Islands.
