= Unique FC =

- Full name: Unique Football Club
- Stadium: Christiansted Field, Christiansted, U.S. Virgin Islands
- Capacity: 1,000
- League: U.S. Virgin Islands Association Club Championship

Unique FC is a U.S. Virgin Islands professional soccer club based in Christiansted, that competes in the U.S. Virgin Islands Association Club Championship. They were previously known as Unique and Tropical FC. Unique were the de facto national champions in 2010.

== Honors ==
- St. Croix Soccer League
  - Winners (2): 1998–99, 2009–10
  - Runners-up (2): 1997–98, 2010–11
