= Rovers SC =

- Full name: Rovers Soccer Club
- Founded: 1990
- Stadium: Bethlehem Soccer Stadium
- Capacity: 1,200
- Chairman: Yahya Yusuf
- Manager: Terrence Jones
- League: USVISF Premier League
- 2024: 1st

Rovers SC is a U.S. Virgin Islands professional soccer club based in the Christiansted, Saint Croix that currently competes in the USVISF Premier League.

== History ==
In 2024, Rovers SC went undefeated on the season to win its first USVISF Premier League title. En route to the league title, the club also secured first place in the Saint Croix Division. By virtue of its 2024 league championship, the club was the USVI's representative in the 2025 CFU Club Shield held in Trinidad and Tobago. It was the first time the club had qualified for the international competition.

In May 2025, Rovers SC defeated New Vibes SC to capture the inaugural USVISF FA Shield.

== International competition ==
Results list Rovers SC's goal tally first.

Competition	Round	Club	Score
2025 CFU Club Shield	Group Stage	(Puerto Rico) Academia Quintana	0–5
2025 CFU Club Shield	Group Stage	(Turks and Caicos Islands) Academy Eagles	0–5

== Honors ==
- USVISF Premier League
  - Winners (1): 2024
- St. Croix Division
  - Winners (1): 2024
- St. Croix Soccer League
  - Winners (1): 2012–13
  - Runners-up (5): 2001–02, 2003–04, 2004–05, 2011–12, 2014–15
- USVISF FA Shield
  - Winners (1): 2025

== Women's team ==
The club has also fielded a team, the Lady Rovers, in the USVISF Women’s Premier League since the league was founded in 2024. The club won the championship in the league’s inaugural season, defeating Castaways SC in the final.
