= Prankton SC =

- Full name: Prankton Soccer Club
- League: USVISF Premier League
- 2022–23: 4th

Prankton SC is a U.S. Virgin Islands professional soccer club that plays in the USVISF Premier League. During the 2010–11 season, the club came in fourth place.
