= Raymix SC =

- Full name: Raymix Soccer Club
- Founded: 2009
- League: USVISF Premier League
Home colors	Away colors

Raymix SC is a U.S. Virgin Islands soccer club based on St. Thomas. The club competes in the USVISF Premier League.

== Honors ==
- U.S. Virgin Islands Championship
  - Winners (2): 2016, 2017
  - Runners-up (1): 2015,2025
- St Thomas Soccer League
  - Winners (3): 2015, 2016, 2017
