= Helenites SC =

- Full name: Helenites Sports Club
- Founded: 1991
- Stadium: Grove Place Park, Grove Place, U.S. Virgin Islands
- Capacity: 1,000
- League: USVISF Premier League
Home colors	Away colors

Helenites SC is a US Virgin Islands professional soccer club based in Grove Place. They compete in the USVISF Premier League as one of the most successful clubs. Helenites often play home games in front of dozens of spectators.

== Honors ==
- U.S. Virgin Islands Premier League:
  - Winners: 2006–07, 2011–12, 2013–14, 2014–15, 2018–19
  - Runners-up: 1997–98, 1999–00, 2004–05, 2015–16, 2016–17
- St Croix Soccer League:
  - Winners (17): 1997–98, 1999–00, 2000–01, 2001–02, 2002–03, 2003–04, 2004–05, 2005–06, 2006–07, 2007–08, 2008–09, 2010–11, 2011–12, 2013–14, 2014–15, 2015–16, 2016–17. 2022–23
  - Runners-up (2): 2009–10, 2012–13
