= New Vibes SC =

New Vibes
- Full name: New Vibes Soccer Club
- Stadium: Ivanna Eudora Kean High School Stadium
- Capacity: 2,000
- League: USVISF Premier League

New Vibes is a U.S. Virgin Islands professional soccer club based in St. Thomas. It competes in the USVISF Premier League.

== Honors ==
- U.S. Virgin Islands Association Club Championship
  - Winners (4): 2005–06, 2008–09, 2012-13, 2022-23
- St Thomas Soccer League
  - Winners (1): 2008–09
  - Runners-up: 2010–11
- USVISF President's Cup
  - Winners (2): 2024, 2025
