= 2023–24 BFA Senior League =

BFA Senior League
- Season: 2023-24
- Champions: Western Warriors
- Matches: 104
- Goals: 575 (5.53 per match)
- Top goalscorer: Lesly St. Fleur (35 goals)
- Biggest home win: Western Warriors 18-0 Cavalier
- Biggest away win: Cavalier 0-19 Bears
- Highest scoring: Cavalier 0-19 Bears

The 2023–24 BFA Senior League is the 33rd season of the BFA Senior League, the top division football competition in Bahamas. The season began on 29 October 2023 and is scheduled to end on 19 May 2024. The league champion automatically qualified for the 2024 CONCACAF Caribbean Shield. Western Warriors successfully defended their title from the previous season, earning their fourth league title.

== Regular season ==
An eleventh team was added to the league from the previous season, Inter Nassau FC.

Pos	Team	Pld	W	D	L	GF	GA	GD	Pts	Qualification or relegation
1	Western Warriors (C)	20	18	2	0	89	19	+70	56	Qualification for the CONCACAF Caribbean Shield
2	UB Mingoes	20	15	2	3	81	21	+60	47	
3	Westside-Renegades	20	15	0	5	66	27	+39	45	
4	Bears	20	13	5	2	102	26	+76	44	
5	Inter Nassau	20	8	2	10	59	69	−10	26	
6	Dynamos	20	7	2	11	49	55	−6	23	
7	United	20	6	3	11	32	43	−11	21	
8	Cavalier	20	7	0	13	32	102	−70	21	
9	Future Stars	20	5	2	13	39	73	−34	17	
10	Inter Nassau U-17	20	3	1	16	22	85	−63	10	
11	Baha Juniors	20	2	3	15	30	81	−51	9	

Updated to match(es) played on 19 May 2024. Source: TNT Sports
(C) Champions
