= 2025–26 BFA Senior League =

BFA Senior League
- Season: 2025–26
- Champions: UB Mingoes
- Relegated: Baha Juniors
- Caribbean Shield: UB Mingoes
- Biggest home win: WWR 10–0 CAV (2 November 2025)
- Biggest away win: CAV 0–11 ITN (14 December 2025)

The 2025–26 BFA Senior League was the 35th season of the BFA Senior League, the top division football competition in Bahamas. The season began on 19 October 2025 and concluded on 19 April 2026. The league champion automatically qualified for the 2027 CFU Club Shield.

The UB Mingoes men's soccer program won their second ever league title, and their first since 2018, finishing with an 11–3–1 record.

== Teams ==
=== Stadia and locations ===
Team	Location	Stadium	Capacity
Baha Juniors FC	Nassau	Roscow A. L. Davies Soccer Field	1,700
Cavalier	Nassau	Thomas Robinson Stadium	15,023
Dynamos	Nassau	Roscow A. L. Davies Soccer Field	1,700
Future Stars	Nassau	Roscow A. L. Davies Soccer Field	1,700
Inter Nassau (lt)	Nassau	Roscow A. L. Davies Soccer Field	1,700
Renegades	Nassau	Roscow A. L. Davies Soccer Field	1,700
UB Mingoes	Nassau	Roscow A. L. Davies Soccer Field	1,700
United	Nassau	Roscow A. L. Davies Soccer Field	1,700
Western Warriors	Lyford Cay	St. Paul's Field	300

== Table ==
Pos	Team	Pld	W	D	L	GF	GA	GD	Pts	Qualification or relegation
1	UB Mingoes (C)	15	11	3	1	61	12	+49	36	Qualification for the CFU Club Shield
2	Westside–Renegades	15	9	2	4	51	22	+29	29	
3	Dynamos	15	9	2	4	32	20	+12	29	
4	Western Warriors	15	9	1	5	50	30	+20	28	
5	United	15	8	3	4	34	16	+18	27	
6	Inter Nassau	15	5	2	8	32	34	−2	17	
7	Future Stars	15	0	4	11	18	49	−31	4	
8	Cavalier	15	1	1	13	8	99	−91	4	
9	Baha Juniors (Note: Club automatically finishes ninth, and results round 10-16 annulled.)	8	2	2	4	10	14	−4	8	Withdrew during the season

Source: RSSSF
Rules for classification: At end of season: 1) Points; 2) Goal difference; 3) Goals scored; 4) Head-to-head points; 5) Head-to-head goal difference; 6) Head-to-head goals scored; 7) Head-to-head away goals scored; 8) Play-off match or matches; 9) Penalty shoot-out (if the play-off match or matches end in a draw)
(C) Champions
