= 2019–20 BFA Senior League =

BFA Senior League
- Season: 2019–20
- Matches played: 27
- Goals scored: 124 (4.59 per match)
- Biggest home win: Bears 9-1 Baha Juniors
- Biggest away win: Baha Juniors 0-7 Dynamos
- Highest scoring: Bears 9-1 Baha Juniors; WW Gladiators 5-5 Future Titans

The 2019–20 BFA Senior League was the 29th season of the BFA Senior League, the top division football competition in Bahamas. The season began on 12 January 2020 and was postponed during the sixth round of matches due to the COVID-19 pandemic. The season will be followed by a four-team playoff to determine the champion of the league, who will automatically qualify for the 2021 Caribbean Club Shield. Dynamos are the defending champions from the previous season.

== Regular season ==
As opposed to the previous season, the two divisions were merged to create a single division of 11 teams. Bahamas First Stars withdrew from the league prior to the first round of matches.

Pos	Team	Pld	W	D	L	GF	GA	GD	Pts	Qualification or relegation
1	Bears	5	5	0	0	24	2	+22	15	Advance to Playoffs
2	Western Warriors Titans	6	4	1	1	15	10	+5	13	Advance to Playoffs
3	Dynamos	6	3	2	1	20	5	+15	11	Advance to Playoffs
4	Renegades	5	3	0	2	11	7	+4	9	Advance to Playoffs
5	Cavalier	6	3	0	3	14	18	−4	9	
6	Western Warriors Gladiators	5	2	2	1	14	9	+5	8	
7	Future Titans	5	1	2	2	14	18	−4	5	
8	Baha Juniors	6	1	1	4	7	28	−21	4	
9	United	5	1	0	4	2	14	−12	3	
10	UB Mingoes	5	0	0	5	3	13	−10	0	
11	Bahamas First Stars (W)	0	0	0	0	0	0	0	0	Withdrew (Note: Bahamas First Stars withdrew from league before playing a match)

Updated to match(es) played on 15 March 2020. Source: BFA
(W) Withdrew from the competition

== Playoffs ==
Following the conclusion of the season, the top four teams in the league will advance to a single-elimination playoff to determine the champion.

Semi-finals
TBA
First-Place Team
Fourth-Place Team
TBA
Second-Place Team
Third-Place Team

Final
TBA
Winner of Game 1
Winner of Game 2
Third place match
TBA
Loser of Game 1
Loser of Game 2
