= 2016–17 BFA Senior League =

BFA Senior League
- Season: 2016–17
- Champions: Western Warriors SC

The 2016–17 BFA Senior League was the 26th season of the Bahamas top-flight football league.

== First stage ==
Top two teams in each group plus the best third-placed team qualified for the Championship Division.

=== Group A ===
Pos	Team	Pld	W	D	L	GF	GA	GD	Pts	Qualification
1	Dynamos	4	4	0	0	13	2	+11	12	Championship Division
2	Bears	4	3	0	1	7	2	+5	9	Championship Division
3	United	4	2	0	2	7	5	+2	6	Championship Division
4	Breezes FC	4	1	0	3	5	19	−14	3	Shield Division
5	Cavalier	4	0	0	4	3	17	−14	0	Shield Division

Rules for classification: 1) points; 2) goal difference; 3) number of goals scored.

=== Group B ===
Pos	Team	Pld	W	D	L	GF	GA	GD	Pts	Qualification
1	Western Warriors	4	3	1	0	14	3	+11	10	Championship Division
2	Lyford Cay Dragons	4	2	2	0	8	4	+4	8	Championship Division
3	Future Stars	4	2	0	2	7	12	−5	6	Shield Division
4	College of the Bahamas	4	0	2	2	3	6	−3	2	Shield Division
5	Baha Juniors FC	4	0	1	3	1	6	−5	1	Shield Division

Rules for classification: 1) points; 2) goal difference; 3) number of goals scored.

== Second stage ==
Standings as of 20 March 2017 (before final match between Breezes and Future Stars)

=== Championship Division ===
Pos	Team	Pld	W	D	L	GF	GA	GD	Pts
1	Western Warriors	4	3	1	0	9	3	+6	10
2	Bears	4	2	1	1	9	5	+4	7
3	Dynamos	4	1	3	0	9	5	+4	6
4	United	4	1	1	2	5	7	−2	4
5	Lyford Cay Dragons	4	0	0	4	2	14	−12	0

Rules for classification: 1) points; 2) goal difference; 3) number of goals scored.

=== Shield Division ===
Pos	Team	Pld	W	D	L	GF	GA	GD	Pts
1	College of the Bahamas	4	3	1	0	10	3	+7	10
2	Baha Juniors FC	4	3	1	0	8	3	+5	10
3	Breezes FC	3	1	0	2	10	10	0	3
4	Cavalier	4	1	0	3	10	18	−8	3
5	Future Stars	3	0	0	3	8	12	−4	0

Rules for classification: 1) points; 2) goal difference; 3) number of goals scored.
