= 2014–15 BFA Senior League =

BFA Senior League
- Season: 2014–15
- Matches: 27
- Goals: 129 (4.78 per match)
- All statistics correct as of 11 December 2014.

The 2014–15 BFA Senior League is the 24th season of the Bahamas top-flight football league. The league consists of 13 clubs split into two groups.

== League table ==
The season began on 22 October 2014, with defending champion Lyford Cay Dragons defeating COB 3-0.

=== Group 1 ===
Pos	Team	Pld	W	D	L	GF	GA	GD	Pts	Qualification
1	Lyford Cay Dragons	6	6	0	0	31	2	+29	18	Championship Round
2	Future Stars	6	4	1	1	27	6	+21	13	Championship Round
3	College of the Bahamas	6	3	1	2	13	7	+6	10	
4	Super Stars	6	3	1	2	18	19	−1	10	
5	Cubs	6	2	1	3	15	9	+6	7	
6	Cavalier	6	1	0	5	4	25	−21	3	
7	Breezes Eagles	6	0	0	6	3	43	−40	0	

Source: Soccerway
Rules for classification: 1st points; 2nd goal difference; 3rd goals scored.

=== Group 2 ===
Pos	Team	Pld	W	D	L	GF	GA	GD	Pts	Qualification
1	Bears	5	5	0	0	26	1	+25	15	Championship Round
2	Western Warriors	5	3	1	1	6	7	−1	10	Championship Round
3	Baha Juniors	5	3	0	2	6	13	−7	9	
4	United	5	1	2	2	10	11	−1	5	
5	Dynamos	5	1	1	3	5	9	−4	4	
6	University WI	5	0	0	5	2	14	−12	0	

Source: Soccerway
Rules for classification: 1st points; 2nd goal difference; 3rd goals scored.

== Championship Round ==
The Western Warriors won the Championship Round of the 2014–15 BFA Senior League. In Group 2, they played 5 matches, winning 3, drawing 1, and losing 1, with a total of 10 points.
