= 2011 BFA Senior League =

BFA Senior League
- Season: 2011
- Champions: Bears
- Matches played: 42

The 2011 BFA Senior League was the fourth season of the league playing in its then-current format, which involves the top teams from the Grand Bahama and New Providence Soccer Leagues. Previously, the league had been a tournament between the top teams of each island, but became the top level of Bahamian football.

The competition featured the winners of the New Providence Football League and the Grand Bahamas Football League to determine the top club in The Bahamas, as well as the nation's qualifier for the CFU Club Championship.

IM Bears FC are the defending league champions.

== Teams ==
| Club | Home city | Home ground |
|---|---|---|
| Baha Juniors FC | Nassau | Thomas Robinson Stadium |
| Cavalier FC | Nassau | Thomas Robinson Stadium |
| COB | Nassau | Oakes Field |
| Dynamos FC | Coral Harbour | Adelaide Road |
| IM Bears FC | Freeport | Grand Bahama Stadium |
| Lyford Cay Dragons | Nassau | Thomas Robinson Stadium |
| United FC | Nassau | Thomas Robinson Stadium |

== Table ==
| Pos | Team | Pld | W | D | L | GF | GA | GD | Pts |
|---|---|---|---|---|---|---|---|---|---|
| 1 | Bears FC | 12 | 10 | 0 | 2 | 49 | 14 | +35 | 30 |
| 2 | Lyford Cay Dragons | 12 | 8 | 2 | 2 | 45 | 20 | +25 | 26 |
| 3 | Dynamos FC | 12 | 7 | 2 | 3 | 27 | 21 | +6 | 23 |
| 4 | United FC | 12 | 5 | 2 | 5 | 24 | 17 | +7 | 17 |
| 5 | Cavalier | 12 | 4 | 2 | 6 | 24 | 23 | +1 | 14 |
| 6 | Baha Juniors | 12 | 3 | 0 | 9 | 16 | 49 | −33 | 9 |
| 7 | COB | 12 | 1 | 0 | 11 | 15 | 56 | −41 | 3 |

Source: FIFA
Rules for classification: 1) points; 2) goal difference; 3) number of goals scored.
