= 2018–19 BFA Senior League =

BFA Senior League
- Season: 2018–19
- Champions: Dynamos
- Caribbean Club Shield: Dynamos

The 2018–19 BFA Senior League was the 28th season of the BFA Senior League, the top division football competition in Bahamas. The season began on 21 October 2018 and ended on 7 April 2019. The season was followed by a four-team playoff, with the championship match on 28 April 2019. Dynamos defeated Cavalier to earn their first title.

== Regular season ==
Teams play those of own division twice and of other division once.

=== Oceanic Division ===
Pos	Team	Pld	W	D	L	GF	GA	GD	Pts	Qualification or relegation
1	Western Warriors Titans	15	14	0	1	58	10	+48	42	Advance to Playoffs
2	Renegades	15	8	3	4	42	29	+13	27	
3	Bears	15	7	4	4	44	25	+19	25	Advance to Playoffs
4	UB Mingoes	15	7	2	6	24	23	+1	23	
5	Baha Juniors Yellow	15	1	1	13	16	56	−40	4	
6	United	15	1	1	13	12	78	−66	4	

Source: BFA

=== Atlantic Division ===
Pos	Team	Pld	W	D	L	GF	GA	GD	Pts	Qualification or relegation
1	Dynamos	14	12	0	2	61	11	+50	36	Advance to Playoffs
2	Cavalier	14	7	2	5	24	27	−3	23	Advance to Playoffs
3	Future Stars	14	7	2	5	31	27	+4	23	
4	Baha Juniors Blue	14	4	2	8	26	31	−5	14	
5	Western Warriors Gladiators	14	2	3	9	17	38	−21	9	

Source: BFA

== Playoffs ==
Semi-finals
14 April
Dynamos	1
Bears	0
14 April
Western Warriors Titans	2
Cavalier	3

Final
28 April
Dynamos	5
Cavalier	1
Third place match
27 April
Bears	2
Western Warriors Titans	0

== Champions ==
Team	Location	Stadium	Capacity
Dynamos FC	Nassau	Roscow A. L. Davies Soccer Field	1,700
