= 2009–10 BFA Senior League =

BFA Senior League
- Season: 2009–10
- Champions: Bears
- Matches played: 42
- Goals scored: 200 (4.76 per match)

The 2009–10 BFA Senior League is the third season of the league playing under its present format, which involves the top teams from the Grand Bahama and New Providence Soccer Leagues. Previously, the league was a tournament between the top teams of each island, but is now the top flight of Bahamian football.

The competition features the winners of the New Providence Football League and the Grand Bahamas Football League to determine the top club in The Bahamas, as well as the nation's qualifier for the CFU Club Championship.

IM Bears FC won the championship, failing to win only one match in the process.

== Teams ==
Club	Home city	Home ground
Baha Juniors FC	Nassau	Baillou Hills Sporting Complex
Cavalier FC	Nassau	Baillou Hills Sporting Complex
COB	Nassau	Baillou Hills Sporting Complex
Dynamos FC	Coral Harbour	Baillou Hills Sporting Complex
IM Bears FC	Freeport	Baillou Hills Sporting Complex
Lyford Cay Dragons	Nassau	Baillou Hills Sporting Complex
FC Nassau	Nassau	Baillou Hills Sporting Complex
Sharks FC	Nassau	Baillou Hills Sporting Complex
United FC	Nassau	Baillou Hills Sporting Complex

== Table ==
Pos	Team	Pld	W	D	L	GF	GA	GD	Pts	Qualification
1	IM Bears FC	12	10	0	2	49	14	+35	30	2012 CFU Club Championship
2	Lyford Cay Dragons	12	8	2	2	45	20	+25	26	Caribbean competition playoffs
3	Dynamos FC	12	7	2	3	27	21	+6	23	Caribbean competition playoffs
4	United FC	12	5	2	5	24	17	+7	17	
5	Cavalier	12	4	2	6	24	23	+1	14	
6	Baha Juniors	12	3	0	9	16	49	−33	9	
7	COB	12	1	0	11	15	56	−41	3	

Source: FIFA
Rules for classification: 1) points; 2) goal difference; 3) number of goals scored.
