= List of football clubs in the Bahamas =

The following is a list of football clubs in The Bahamas.

- Baha Juniors FC
- Bears FC
- Caledonia Celtic
- Caledonia Thistle
- Cavalier FC
- Dynamos FC
- FC Nassau
- Lyford Cay
- Renegades
- UB Mingoes
- United FC
- Western Warriors SC
