= Wood Julmis =

Bahamian footballer

Personal information
- Full name: Wood Peter Julmis
- Date of birth: 28 May 2001 (age 25)
- Place of birth: Nassau, Bahamas
- Height: 1.80 m (5 ft 11 in)
- Position: Striker

Team information
- Current team: UB Mingoes
- Number: 9

College career
| Years | Team | Apps | (Gls) |
| 2022–2023 | Eastern Oklahoma Mountaineers | 18 | (8) |

Senior career*
| Years | Team | Apps | (Gls) |
| 2017–2022 | Dynamos FC | | |
| 2023– | UB Mingoes | 4 | (4) |

International career^{‡}
| 2021– | Bahamas | 20 | (7) |
- * Club domestic league appearances and goals as of 14:05, 19 September 2024 (UTC) ‡ National team caps and goals as of 20:40, 4 September 2024 (UTC)

Wood Peter Julmis (born 28 May 2001) is a Bahamian footballer who plays for UB Mingoes and the Bahamas national football team.

== Youth career ==
Julmis played for the Knights of CR Walker Senior High School in Nassau while attending the school. In 2018, the team advanced to the finals of the Government Secondary Schools Sports Association (GSSSA) championship with a victory over the Mystic Marlins in the semi-finals. Julmis scored a goal in the 3–1 victory. The Knights went on to win the championship that season and the two following seasons for three consecutive championships through 2020. Julmis served as the team's captain and was its #9. In the 2019 championship match, Julmis scored the game-tying goal in the 90th minute to send the game to extra-time.

== Club career ==
Julmis began playing for BFA Senior League club Dynamos FC in 2017. In February 2018 he scored a hattrick against Future Stars FC for the U18 team. In 2019 he led the team to the BFA Senior League title with a win over Cavalier FC. Julmis scored a hattrick in the championship match. In 2022, he committed to playing college soccer in the United States with the Mountaineers of Eastern Oklahoma State College. He made eighteen appearances for the team that season, scoring eight goals.

By October 2023, Julmis had returned to the Bahamas and joined the UB Mingoes. He scored two goals in a 7–0 pre-season victory over the Fort Lauderdale Eagles, the club largest-ever victory over an international opponent.

== International career ==
Julmis was called up as part of the Bahamas' squad for the first time for 2022 FIFA World Cup qualification matches in March 2021. He went on to make his senior international debut against Saint Kitts and Nevis on 27 March. The match ended in a 0–4 loss with Julmis starting and playing the entire match. In May 2022 Julmis scored his first two senior international goals in back-to-back friendlies against the Turks and Caicos in preparation for the 2022–23 CONCACAF Nations League B.

=== International goals ===
Scores and results list the Bahamas' goal tally first.

| No. | Date | Venue | Opponent | Score | Result | Competition |
|---|---|---|---|---|---|---|
| 1. | 12 May 2022 | Thomas Robinson Stadium, Nassau, Bahamas | Turks and Caicos Islands | 1–0 | 4–2 | Friendly |
| 2. | 14 May 2022 | Thomas Robinson Stadium, Nassau, Bahamas | Turks and Caicos Islands | 1–2 | 1–2 | Friendly |
| 3. | 12 September 2023 | Synthetic Track and Field Facility, Leonora, Guyana | Guyana | 1–0 | 2–3 | 2023–24 CONCACAF Nations League B |
| 4. | 12 September 2023 | Synthetic Track and Field Facility, Leonora, Guyana | Guyana | 2–3 | 2–3 | 2023–24 CONCACAF Nations League B |
| 5. | 14 October 2023 | Thomas Robinson Stadium, Nassau, Bahamas | Antigua and Barbuda | 1–3 | 1–4 | 2023–24 CONCACAF Nations League B |
| 6. | 8 June 2024 | SKNFA Technical Center, Saint Peter, Saint Kitts and Nevis | Trinidad and Tobago | 1–7 | 1–7 | 2026 FIFA World Cup qualification |
| 7. | 4 September 2024 | Bethlehem Soccer Stadium, Upper Bethlehem, United States Virgin Islands | U.S. Virgin Islands | 2–1 | 3–3 | 2024–25 CONCACAF Nations League C |
Last updated 8 June 024

=== International career statistics ===
As of match played 4 September 2024

| National team | Year | Apps | Goals |
|---|---|---|---|
| Bahamas | 2021 | 4 | 0 |
| Bahamas | 2022 | 7 | 2 |
| Bahamas | 2023 | 6 | 3 |
| Bahamas | 2024 | 3 | 2 |
| Total | | 20 | 7 |

== Personal ==
He is the brother of fellow Bahamas international Evelt Julmis.
