= 2017–18 BFA Senior League =

BFA Senior League
- Season: 2017–18
- Champions: UB Mingoes
- Matches played: 45
- Goals scored: 226 (5.02 per match)
- Biggest home win: BEA 14–0 CAV
- Biggest away win: CAV 0–15 WWR
- Highest scoring: 15 goals: CAV 0–15 WWR; 22 April 2018
- Longest winning run: UB Mingoes (9 matches)
- Longest losing run: Cavalier (9 matches)
- All statistics correct as of 24 June 2018.

The 2017–18 BFA Senior League is the 27th season of the Bahamas top-flight football league. The season began on 29 October 2017 and ended on 22 April 2018.

Cities with 2017–18 BFA Senior League teams

== Teams ==
=== Stadia and locations ===
Club	Location	Stadium	Capacity
Baha Juniors	Nassau	Davies Field	1,700
Bears	Nassau	Davies Field	1,700
Breezes Eagles	Nassau	Davies Field	1,700
Cavalier	Nassau	Davies Field	1,700
Dynamos	Nassau	Davies Field	1,700
Future Stars	Nassau	Davies Field	1,700
Renegades	Lyford Cay	Davies Field	1,700
UB Mingoes	Nassau	Robinson Track and Field Stadium	3,000
United	Nassau	Davies Field	1,700
Western Warriors	Nassau	Davies Field	1,700

== Standings ==
Pos	Team	Pld	W	D	L	GF	GA	GD	Pts	Qualification or relegation
1	UB Mingoes (Note: Formerly from College of the Bahamas FC) (C)	9	8	1	0	22	4	+18	25	
2	Western Warriors	9	7	2	0	46	8	+38	23	
3	Bears	9	6	1	2	35	17	+18	19	
4	Dynamos	9	5	1	3	25	15	+10	16	
5	Renegades (Note: Formerly from Lyford Cay FC)	9	3	3	3	27	24	+3	12	
6	Breezes Eagles	9	2	5	2	18	15	+3	11	
7	United	9	2	2	5	16	24	−8	8	
8	Baha Juniors	9	1	3	5	12	19	−7	6	
9	Future Stars (R)	9	1	2	6	16	29	−13	5	Relegation to 2018–19 Regional leagues
10	Cavalier (R)	9	0	0	9	5	69	−64	0	Relegation to 2018–19 Regional leagues

Source: RSSSF
Rules for classification: 1) points; 2) goal difference; 3) number of goals scored.
(C) Champions;
(R) Relegated
