= Bahamas women's national football team =

Women's national association football team representing Bahamas

Bahamas
- Association: Bahamas Football Association
- Confederation: CONCACAF (North America)
- Sub-confederation: CFU (Caribbean)
- Head coach: Cherlindria Thompson
- Top scorer: Janeka Edey (2 Goals)
- Home stadium: Thomas Robinson Stadium
- FIFA code: BAH
First colours	Second colours

FIFA ranking
- Current: 193 (16 June 2026)
- Highest: 96 (July 2003)
- Lowest: 194 (December 2025)

First international
- Bermuda 3–0 Bahamas (Hamilton, Bermuda; 23 April 2000)

Biggest win
- Turks and Caicos Islands 2–5 Bahamas (Providenciales, Turks and Caicos Islands; 1 August 2021)

Biggest defeat
- Bahamas 0–9 Haiti (Nassau, Bahamas; 10 July 2002)

World Cup
- Appearances: 0

CONCACAF Women's Championship
- Appearances: 0

The Bahamas women's national football team is the national women's football team of the Bahamas and is overseen by the Bahamas Football Association. the team played its first game in 2000. the team registered one victory from nine matches they played. they are yet to qualify for a CONCACAF W Championship or any other major tournament.

== History ==
=== Early years ===
The inception of the Bahamas women's national football team dates back to the early 2000s. when they participated in the inaugural Caribbean Football Union Women's Championship qualification preliminary round where they were drawn against Bermuda women's national football team losing both matches with an aggregate score of 9–0.

the Bahamian team's first attempt to qualify for a CONCACAF Women's Gold Cup was in 2002 when they participated in the 2002 CONCACAF Women's Gold Cup qualification. Placed in Group 2, their opponents included national teams from the Dominican Republic, Haiti, and Saint Lucia. Losing all matches the Bahamas scored one consolation goal against St Lucia and conceded 19.

After this unsuccessful campaign, the Bahamas women's national team went on a long break, staying out of the action for 19 years.

=== Back To the International Stage ===
in 2021, the Bahamas Football Association announced the team's return to competitive action. as they would participate in a friendly tournament hosted in the Turks and Caicos Islands, alongside the host team, the Cayman Islands, and the United States Virgin Islands also participated, Although they faced an initial setback, losing their opening match against the Cayman Islands by a margin of 4-0, the Bahamas bounced back with a resounding victory over the host team, Turks and Caicos, prevailing with a score of five to two. to register their first win in 21 years. This triumph secured their spot in the tournament's final, where they faced the Cayman Islands once again, ultimately finishing as runners-up after a 4-0 loss.

Having missed out on major tournaments in recent years, including the 2022 CONCACAF W Championship qualification. The Bahamas entered the newly established 2024 CONCACAF W Gold Cup qualification. They were placed in League C, Group C alongside Grenada and U.S. Virgin Islands.

== Results and fixtures ==
The following is a list of match results in the last 12 months, as well as any future matches that have been scheduled.

Legend

Win Draw Lose Fixture

== Coaching staff ==
=== Current coaching staff ===
As of 19 August 2022

Position	Name
Head coach	(The Bahamas) Cherlindria Thompson
Technical Director	
Assistant coach	(The Bahamas) Ricqea Bain
Assistant coach	(The Bahamas) Gina Stubbs
Goalkeeping coach	Vacant
Fitness coach	Vacant
Delegation Leader	Vacant

=== Manager history ===
Name	Period	Tournament
(The Bahamas) Kevin Davies	2012–2021	
(The Bahamas) Cherlindria Thompson	2021–???	
(The Bahamas) Ricqea Bain	??–Present	

== Players ==
=== Current squad ===
- The following players were named to the squad to play the 2024 CONCACAF W Gold Cup qualification games against U.S. Virgin Islands and on 29 November 2023, respectively.

Last update to caps and goals in September 2023

No.	Pos.	Player	Date of birth (age)	Caps	Goals	Club
–	GK	Raynia Russel	23 January 2008 (age 18)	0	0	(United States Soccer Federation) Hollins University
–	GK	Kendi Outten				
14	DF	Jada Thelamour	11 July 2004 (age 22)	+1	0	(Bahamas Football Association) Cavalier FC
–	DF	Dalexis Huyler	9 March 2007 (age 19)	0	0	(United States Soccer Federation) Mount Mary Blue Angels
	DF	Jade Thelamour	11 July 2004 (age 22)			(Bahamas Football Association) United FC
8	MF	Janeka Edey	25 July 2003 (age 23)	5	3	(Bahamas Football Association) Cavalier FC
	MF	Samantha Ramirez				Renegades FC
13	MF	Hadassah Knowles	24 April 2003 (age 23)	+2	0	(United States Soccer Federation) Whatcom Orcas
10	MF	Giselle Laing		+1	0	(United States Soccer Federation) Louisiana Christian Wildcats
15	MF	Karen Wert (captain)	12 April 1994 (age 32)	2	0	(Bahamas Football Association) Cavalier FC
	MF	Ashya Butler				(Bahamas Football Association) Dynamos FC
11	MF	Rachel Rolle	14 February 2003 (age 23)	2	0	(United States Soccer Federation) AU Yellow Jackets
	MF	Meaghan Smith				
7	FW	Demitra McClure		2	1	(United States Soccer Federation) Northeast Hawks
9	FW	Diane Maillis		2	0	(United States Soccer Federation) Milligan Buffaloes
2	FW	Samina Moss	16 January 2003 (age 23)	2	0	(United States Soccer Federation) UAPB Golden Lions
19	FW	Valtinique Simmons	28 November 2007 (age 18)	2	0	(United States Soccer Federation) Hollins University
	FW	Kenyonique Thompson				
20	FW	Kyrah Miller	17 October 2007 (age 18)	0	0	(Bahamas Football Association) Cavalier FC
	FW	Rokesia Sands				(United States Soccer Federation) Whatcom Orcas

=== Recent call-ups ===
The following players have also been called up to the Turks and Caicos Islands squad within the last 12 months.

Pos.	Player	Date of birth (age)	Caps	Goals	Club	Latest call-up

== Records ==
As of 20 September 2023

*Players in bold are still active, at least at club level.

=== Most capped players ===
#	Player	Year(s)	Caps	Goals

=== Top goalscorers ===
#	Player	Year(s)	Goals	Caps
**1**	**Janeka Edey**	2021–present	2	4
**2**	**Asia Williams**	2021–present	1	3
**2**	**Keyonique Thompson**	2021–present	1	3
**2**	**Alexis Williamson**	2021–present	1	3
**2**	**Demitra McClure**	2023–present	1	1

== Competitive record ==
=== FIFA Women's World Cup ===
FIFA Women's World Cup record
Year	Result	Pld	W	D*	L	GF	GA
(China) 1991 to (United States) 1999	Did not exist						
(United States) 2003	Did not qualify						
(China) 2007	Did not enter						
(Germany) 2011	Did not enter						
(Canada) 2015	Did not enter						
(France) 2019	Did not enter						
(Australia) (New Zealand) 2023	Did not enter						
(Brazil) 2027	Did not enter						
(Costa Rica) (Jamaica) (Mexico) (United States) 2031	To be determined						
(United Kingdom) 2035	To be determined						
Total	–	–	–	–	–	–	–

*Draws include knockout matches decided on penalty kicks.

=== Olympic Games ===
Summer Olympics record									Qualifying record					
Year	Round	Position	Pld	W	D*	L	GF	GA	Pld	W	D*	L	GF	GA
(United States) 1996 to (Australia) 2000	Did not exist								Did not exist					
(Greece) 2004	Did not enter								Did not enter					
(China) 2008	Did not enter								Did not enter					
(United Kingdom) 2012	Did not enter								Did not enter					
(Brazil) 2016	Did not enter								Did not enter					
(Japan) 2020	Did not enter								Did not enter					
(France) 2024	Did not enter								Did not enter					
(United States) 2028	Did not enter								Did not enter					
Total	–	–	–	–	–	–	–	–	–	–	–	–	–	–

*Draws include knockout matches decided on penalty kicks.

=== CONCACAF W Championship ===
CONCACAF W Championship record								Qualification record					
Year	Result	Pld	W	D*	L	GF	GA	Pld	W	D*	L	GF	GA
(Haiti) 1991	Did not enter							Did not enter					
(United States) 1993	Did not enter							Did not enter					
(Canada) 1994	Did not enter							Did not enter					
(Canada) 1998	Did not enter							Did not enter					
(United States) 2000	Did not enter							Did not enter					
(United States) (Canada) 2002	Did not qualify							3	0	0	3	1	19
(United States) 2006	Did not enter							Did not enter					
(Mexico) 2010	Did not enter							Did not enter					
(United States) 2014	Did not enter							2014 Caribbean Cup					
(United States) 2018	Did not enter							Did not enter					
(Mexico) 2022	Did not enter							Did not enter					
(United States) 2026	Did not enter							Did not enter					
Total	–	–	–	–	–	–	–	3	0	0	3	1	19

*Draws include knockout matches decided on penalty kicks.

=== CONCACAF W Gold Cup ===
CONCACAF W Gold Cup record								Qualification record							
Year	Result	GP	W	D*	L	GF	GA	Division	Group	GP	W	D*	L	GF	GA
(United States) 2024	Did not qualify							C	C	4	0	1	3	3	12
(N/A) 2029	To be determined							To be determined							
Total	–	–	–	–	–	–	–	–	–	4	0	1	3	3	12

*Draws include knockout matches decided on penalty kicks.

=== CFU Women's Caribbean Cup ===
CFU Women's Caribbean Cup record
Year	Result	Pld	W	D*	L	GF	GA
(Haiti) 2000	Preliminary round	2	0	0	2	0	9
(Trinidad and Tobago) 2014	Did not enter						
2018	Did not enter						
Total	First round	2	0	0	2	0	9

*Draws include knockout matches decided on penalty kicks.

== FIFA world rankings ==
The Bahamas women's national football team has never been ranked by FIFA.
