= 2015–16 BFA Senior League =

BFA Senior League
- Season: 2015–16
- Champions: Bears FC

The 2015–16 BFA Senior League was the 25th season of the Bahamas top-flight football league.

== Standings ==
Pos	Team	Pld	W	D	L	GF	GA	GD	Pts
1	Bears	7	5	2	0	29	10	+19	17
2	Western Warriors	7	4	2	1	27	7	+20	14
3	Super Stars FC	7	4	1	2	20	16	+4	13
4	Dynamos	7	3	3	1	11	9	+2	12
5	Future Stars	7	3	1	3	12	10	+2	10
6	United	7	3	0	4	14	16	−2	9
7	Breezes FC	7	1	1	5	17	18	−1	4
8	Cavalier	7	0	0	7	5	54	−49	0

Rules for classification: 1) points; 2) goal difference; 3) number of goals scored.
