= Ian Lowe (footballer) =

Bahamian footballer

Personal information
- Date of birth: 29 August 2002 (age 24)
- Place of birth: Bahamas
- Height: 1.85 m (6 ft 1 in)
- Position: Goalkeeper

Team information
- Current team: Olivet Nazarene Tigers

Youth career
- 2013–2017: Lyford Cay
- 2017–2021: Dynamos

College career
| Years | Team | Apps | (Gls) |
| 2021– | Olivet Nazarene Tigers | 3 | (0) |

International career^{‡}
| 2018– | Bahamas | 6 | (0) |
- ‡ National team caps and goals as of 22:47, 5 June 2021 (UTC)

Ian Lowe (born 29 August 2002) is a Bahamian footballer who plays for the Olivet Nazarene Tigers and the Bahamas national team.

== Youth and college career ==
Lowe began playing for Lyford Cay FC at age 11. Three years later, he made a position change to goalkeeper. Following the 2016/17 Bahamas U15 Division season, Lowe joined Dynamos FC and posted fifteen shutouts during his first season with the club.

In June 2021 it was announced that Lowe would be playing college soccer in the United States for the Tigers of Olivet Nazarene University beginning with the 2021/22 season.

== International career ==
Lowe was called up to the national team for the first time in September 2018 for CONCACAF Nations League qualifying. Lowe made his senior debut for the Bahamas on 7 September 2018, registering eleven minutes off the bench in a 4–0 defeat to Belize in CONCACAF Nations League qualifying. He was called up once again, this time for a match against Anguilla, in November 2018.

=== International statistics ===
As of match played June 5, 2021

| National team | Year | Apps | Goals |
|---|---|---|---|
| Bahamas | 2018 | 1 | 0 |
| Bahamas | 2019 | 0 | 0 |
| Bahamas | 2020 | 0 | 0 |
| Bahamas | 2021 | 5 | 0 |
| Total | | 6 | 0 |
