= Ricardo McPhee =

Bahamian footballer

Personal information
- Full name: Ricardo Rivaldo Jade McPhee
- Date of birth: 3 June 1999 (age 27)
- Place of birth: Nassau, Bahamas
- Position: Forward

Team information
- Current team: United FC

Senior career*
Years	Team	Apps	(Gls)
2017–	United FC		

International career^{‡}
2018–	Bahamas	3	(1)
- * Club domestic league appearances and goals as of 15 January 2019 ‡ National team caps and goals as of 16 March 2019

Ricardo Rivaldo Jade McPhee (born 3 June 1999) is a Bahamian footballer who plays for United FC and the Bahamas national football team.

== International career ==
McPhee made his senior international debut on 7 September 2018 in a 4–0 away defeat to Belize during CONCACAF Nations League qualifying.

=== International goals ===
Scores and results list the Bahamas' goal tally first.

No.	Date	Venue	Opponent	Score	Result	Competition
1.	16 March 2019	Thomas Robinson Stadium, Nassau, Bahamas	Turks and Caicos Islands	3–0	6–1	Friendly
