= Ronaldo Green =

Bahamian footballer

Personal information
- Full name: Ronaldo Romario Green
- Date of birth: 1 August 2000 (age 26)
- Place of birth: Kingston, Jamaica
- Position: Midfielder

Team information
- Current team: UB Mingoes
- Number: 11

Youth career
- 2012-2015: Edgewater FC

Senior career*
Years	Team	Apps	(Gls)
2018–2021	Western Warriors		
2021–2022	Waterford	5	(0)
2022–	UB Mingoes	59	(63)
- * Club domestic league appearances and goals as of 19:42, 14 March 2023 (UTC) ‡ National team caps and goals as of 19:42, 14 March 2023 (UTC)

Ronaldo Green (born 1 August 2000) is a Jamaican footballer who plays for UB Mingoes of the BFA Senior League.

== Club career ==
As a youth, Green came up through the ranks of Edgewater FC, Cavalier SC, Manta Rays FC & Western Warriors and featured for the senior side of Western Warriors FC in the domestic BFA Senior League. In July 2021 he joined up with Waterford F.C. of the League of Ireland Premier Division. The following October he signed a professional contract with the club following the successful trial. He made his professional debut for the club on 25 October 2021 in a 2021 FAI Cup semi-finals match against Bohemian.

Waterford manager Marc Bircham described Green as a "young lad from the Bahamas with big potential" that he had been monitoring since his early days as manager at the club. Following the season, Waterford was relegated to the League of Ireland First Division with forty two points, the most ever earned by a relegated club.

By October 2022, following his departure from Waterford, Green returned to the BFA Senior League and joined the UB Mingoes of the University of the Bahamas. In the first match of the 2022–23 season, Green scored four goals in a 5–3 victory over Renegades FC. About the performance, Mingoes assistant manager Alex Thompson said, "The win also solidifies Green as the best player in the league on the best up and coming team. He had four goals today and could have had a few more and a few more assists."
