= Torin Ferguson =

Bahamian footballer

Personal information
- Full name: Torin Ferguson
- Date of birth: 29 July 1985 (age 41)
- Place of birth: Bahamas
- Position: Goalkeeper

Senior career*
Years	Team	Apps	(Gls)
2004–2015	Bears		

International career^{‡}
2006	Bahamas	1	(0)
- * Club domestic league appearances and goals as of 3 January 2012 ‡ National team caps and goals as of 3 January 2012

Torin Ferguson (born 29 July 1985 in the Bahamas) is a footballer who plays as a goalkeeper. He currently plays for BFA Senior League club Bears and the Bahamas national football team.

== Club career ==
In 2004, he signed with BFA Senior League club Bears.

== International career ==
He made his debut for the Bahamas national football team in a September 2006 Caribbean Cup qualification match against Cuba, coming on as a sub for Dwayne Whylly. He also plays for the national beach soccer team.
