= Football in the Bahamas =

Football in Bahamas
- Country: Bahamas
- Governing body: Bahamas Football Association
- National team: Men's national team

International competitions
- CONCACAF Champions League; CONCACAF League; FIFA Club World Cup; CONCACAF Gold Cup (National Team); CONCACAF Nations League (National Team); FIFA World Cup (National Team); CONCACAF Women's Championship (National Team); FIFA Women's World Cup (National Team)

The sport of association football in the Bahamas is run by the Bahamas Football Association. The association administers the Bahamas national football team, the beach soccer teams and futsal. It is part of the CONCACAF.

Since 2021 the women's football has an own director for the first time.

== Men's League system ==
Level	League(s)/Division(s)
1	BFA Senior League; 12 clubs

Former leagues have been the New Providence Football League and the Grand Bahama Football League.

== Women's League system ==
In 2016 the BFA started a national League.

== Men's National team ==
Main article: Bahamas men's national football team

The best men's national team ranking has been 136.

== Women's National team ==
Main article: Bahamas women's national football team

The best women's national team ranking has been 96.
