= 2015 CFU Club Championship =

2015 CFU Club Champions’ Cup

Tournament details
- Dates: 15 April – 22 May 2015
- Teams: 15 (from 9 associations)

Final positions
- Champions: (Trinidad and Tobago) Central (1st title)
- Runners-up: (Trinidad and Tobago) W Connection
- Third place: (Jamaica) Montego Bay United
- Fourth place: (Haiti) Don Bosco

Tournament statistics
- Matches played: 22
- Goals scored: 84 (3.82 per match)
- Top scorer(s): (Trinidad and Tobago) Hashim Arcia (7 goals)

The 2015 CFU Club Championship was the 17th edition of CFU Club Championship, the annual international club football competition in the Caribbean region, held amongst clubs whose football associations are affiliated with the Caribbean Football Union (CFU). The top three teams in the tournament qualified for the 2015–16 CONCACAF Champions League.

Central won the tournament by defeating fellow Trinidadian side W Connection in the final. Both teams qualified for the Champions League, along with Montego Bay United of Jamaica, who defeated Haitian side Don Bosco in the third place game.

The first round was held in April 2015 at sites in Haiti, Guyana, and Trinidad and Tobago. The final round was played in May 2015 in Trinidad and Tobago.

== Teams ==
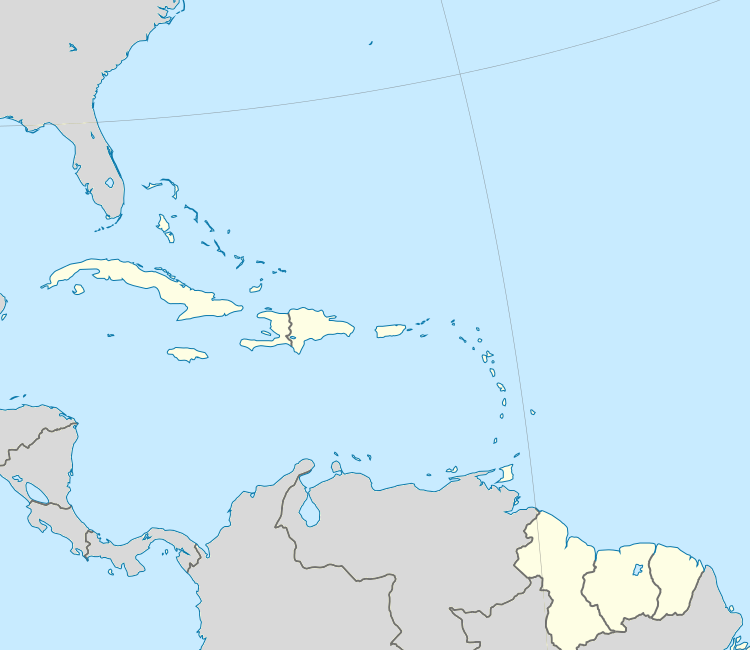
Location of teams of the 2015 CFU Club Championship
Red: Group 1; Green: Group 2; Blue: Group 3; Yellow: Group 4; Dots: indicate group hosts; Pogs: indicate other group teams

The tournament was open to all league champions and runners-up from each of the 31 CFU member associations (or cup winners if the league was not played), once their competition ended on or before the end of 2014.

A total of 15 teams from 9 CFU associations entered the competition, as they met the registration and fee payment deadline of January 7, 2015. This is the first CFU Club Championship to feature a team from the Bahamas, with Lyford Cay Dragons as their entrant.

There are no defending champions as no final was played in 2014.

Association	Team	Qualification method
(Antigua and Barbuda) Antigua and Barbuda	SAP	2013–14 Antigua and Barbuda Premier Division champions
(The Bahamas) Bahamas	Lyford Cay Dragons	2013–14 BFA Senior League champions
Guadeloupe	Moulien	2013–14 Guadeloupe Division d'Honneur champions
Guadeloupe	USR	2013–14 Guadeloupe Division d'Honneur runners-up
Guyana	Alpha United	2013–14 GFF National Super League champions
Guyana	Guyana Defence Force	2013–14 GFF National Super League runners-up
Haiti	América des Cayes	2014 Ligue Haïtienne Tournoi d'Ouverture champions
Haiti	Don Bosco	2014 Ligue Haïtienne Tournoi de Clôture champions
Jamaica	Montego Bay United	2013–14 National Premier League champions
Jamaica	Waterhouse	2013–14 National Premier League runners-up
Suriname	Inter Moengotapoe	2013–14 SVB Hoofdklasse champions
Suriname	Excelsior	2013–14 SVB Hoofdklasse runners-up
(Trinidad and Tobago) Trinidad and Tobago	W Connection	2013–14 TT Pro League champions
(Trinidad and Tobago) Trinidad and Tobago	Central	2013–14 TT Pro League runners-up
(United States Virgin Islands) U.S. Virgin Islands	Helenites	2013–14 U.S. Virgin Islands Championship champions

Associations which did not enter a team
- Anguilla
- Aruba
- Barbados
- Bermuda
- Bonaire
- (British Virgin Islands) British Virgin Islands
- (Cayman Islands) Cayman Islands
- Cuba
- Curaçao
- Dominica
- (Dominican Republic) Dominican Republic
- (French Guiana) French Guiana
- Grenada
- Martinique
- Montserrat
- (Puerto Rico) Puerto Rico
- (Saint Kitts and Nevis) Saint Kitts and Nevis
- (Saint Lucia) Saint Lucia
- (Collectivity of Saint Martin) Saint-Martin
- (Saint Vincent and the Grenadines) Saint Vincent and the Grenadines
- (Sint Maarten) Sint Maarten
- (Turks and Caicos Islands) Turks and Caicos Islands

== Schedule ==
Round	Dates
First round	15–19 April 2015
Final round	22–24 May 2015

== First round ==
In the first round, the 15 teams were divided into three groups of four and one group of three, with each group containing at least two league champions. Each group was played on a round-robin basis, hosted by one of the teams at a centralized venue. The winners of each group advanced to the semi-finals.

=== Group 1 ===
- Hosted by Alpha United in Providence, Guyana (all times UTC−4).

Pos	Team	Pld	W	D	L	GF	GA	GD	Pts	Qualification
1	(Trinidad and Tobago) Central	2	2	0	0	5	1	+4	6	Advance to final round
2	(Guyana) Alpha United (H)	2	1	0	1	4	3	+1	3	
3	(Suriname) Inter Moengotapoe	2	0	0	2	0	5	−5	0	

Source: CFU
(H) Hosts
April 15, 2015
16:00

Alpha United (Guyana)	3–0	(Suriname) Inter Moengotapoe
Wilson 36'; Richardson 56'; Bain 90'	Report

Guyana National Stadium, Providence
Referee: Bryan Willett (Antigua and Barbuda)

April 17, 2015
16:00

Inter Moengotapoe (Suriname)	0–2	(Trinidad and Tobago) Central
	Report	Plaza 54', 58'

Guyana National Stadium, Providence
Referee: Kerry Skepple (Antigua and Barbuda)

April 19, 2015
16:00

Alpha United (Guyana)	1–3	(Trinidad and Tobago) Central
Mannings 45'	Report	Guerra 16', 85' (pen.); De Silva 17'

Guyana National Stadium, Providence
Referee: Bryan Willett (Antigua and Barbuda)

=== Group 2 ===
- Hosted by W Connection in Couva, Trinidad and Tobago (all times UTC−4).

Pos	Team	Pld	W	D	L	GF	GA	GD	Pts	Qualification
1	(Trinidad and Tobago) W Connection (H)	2	2	0	0	14	3	+11	6	Advance to final round
2	(Antigua and Barbuda) SAP	2	0	1	1	4	9	−5	1	
3	Guyana Defence Force	2	0	1	1	3	9	−6	1	
4	(Jamaica) Waterhouse	0	0	0	0	0	0	0	0	Withdrew

Source: CFU
(H) Hosts
April 15, 2015
17:30

SAP (Antigua and Barbuda)	Cancelled	(Jamaica) Waterhouse

Ato Boldon Stadium, Couva
April 15, 2015
20:00

W Connection (Trinidad and Tobago)	7–1	Guyana Defence Force
Garcia 18'; Winchester 20', 26'; Arcia 32', 46', 85'; Britto 40'	Report	Fraser 90+4'

Ato Boldon Stadium, Couva
Referee: Trevor Taylor (Barbados)

April 17, 2015
17:30

Waterhouse (Jamaica)	Cancelled	Guyana Defence Force

Ato Boldon Stadium, Couva
April 17, 2015
18:00

Guyana Defence Force	2–2	(Antigua and Barbuda) SAP
Fraser 8', 63'	Report	Harriette 10'; Mack 68'

Ato Boldon Stadium, Couva
Referee: Juniel Adelina (Curaçao)

April 19, 2015
18:00

W Connection (Trinidad and Tobago)	Cancelled	(Jamaica) Waterhouse

Ato Boldon Stadium, Couva
April 19, 2015
18:00

W Connection (Trinidad and Tobago)	7–2	(Antigua and Barbuda) SAP
Williams 4'; Britto 8', 82'; Arcia 18', 44', 45'; Winchester 25'	Report	Harriette 59'; Roberts 78'

Ato Boldon Stadium, Couva
Referee: Rhomie Blanc (Dominica)

Notes

1. In the original schedule, W Connection and SAP were to play on April 17 at 20:00, while Guyana Defence Force and SAP were to play on April 19 at 15:30. The match dates were swapped and start times were moved to 18:00 following Waterhouse's withdrawal.

=== Group 3 ===
- Hosted by América des Cayes in Les Cayes, Haiti (all times UTC−4).

Pos	Team	Pld	W	D	L	GF	GA	GD	Pts	Qualification
1	(Jamaica) Montego Bay United	3	3	0	0	8	1	+7	9	Advance to final round
2	(Haiti) América des Cayes (H)	3	2	0	1	7	7	0	6	
3	(Guadeloupe) Moulien	3	1	0	2	4	5	−1	3	
4	(Suriname) Excelsior	3	0	0	3	4	10	−6	0	

Source: CFU
(H) Hosts
April 15, 2015
17:30

Montego Bay United (Jamaica)	1–0	(Guadeloupe) Moulien
McCarthy 65' (pen.)	Report

Complexe Sportif des Cayes, Les Cayes
Referee: Marcos Brea (Cuba)
April 15, 2015
20:00

América des Cayes (Haiti)	4–2	(Suriname) Excelsior
Pierre 17', 48'; Saint Jean 70'; Valerius 85'	Report	Christoph 62'; Paiva 87'

Complexe Sportif des Cayes, Les Cayes
Referee: Yadel Martínez (Cuba)

April 17, 2015
15:30

Moulien (Guadeloupe)	3–2	(Suriname) Excelsior
Bolmin 6', 20'; Gomez 16'	Report	Christoph 41', 59' (pen.)

Complexe Sportif des Cayes, Les Cayes
Referee: Michel Rodríguez (Cuba)
April 17, 2015
18:00

América des Cayes (Haiti)	1–4	(Jamaica) Montego Bay United
Germain 75'	Report	McCarthy 40'; Williams 51'; Rodney 74'; Gordon 90+4'

Complexe Sportif des Cayes, Les Cayes
Referee: Jafeth Perea (Panama)

April 19, 2015
15:30

Excelsior (Suriname)	0–3	(Jamaica) Montego Bay United
	Report	Woozencroft 35'; Kirlew 70'; Ottey 89'

Complexe Sportif des Cayes, Les Cayes
Referee: Yadel Martínez (Cuba)
April 19, 2015
18:00

América des Cayes (Haiti)	2–1	(Guadeloupe) Moulien
Charles 52'; Germain 74'	Report	Gomez 38'

Complexe Sportif des Cayes, Les Cayes
Referee: Jafeth Perea (Panama)

=== Group 4 ===
- Hosted by Don Bosco in Port-au-Prince, Haiti (all times UTC−4).

Pos	Team	Pld	W	D	L	GF	GA	GD	Pts	Qualification
1	(Haiti) Don Bosco (H)	3	3	0	0	16	1	+15	9	Advance to final round
2	(The Bahamas) Lyford Cay Dragons	3	1	1	1	3	12	−9	4	
3	(Guadeloupe) USR	3	0	2	1	4	5	−1	2	
4	(United States Virgin Islands) Helenites	3	0	1	2	3	8	−5	1	

Source: CFU
(H) Hosts
April 15, 2015
16:00

Helenites (United States Virgin Islands)	2–2	(Guadeloupe) USR
Smith 29', 40'	Report	Lundy 54'; Lubino 68'

Stade Sylvio Cator, Port-au-Prince
Referee: Karl Tyrell (Jamaica)
April 15, 2015
18:30

Don Bosco (Haiti)	10–0	(The Bahamas) Lyford Cay Dragons
Desroches 10'; Georges 12', 65'; Estama 14' (pen.), 20', 29', 47', 55'; Constant 69'; Saint Jean 87'	Report

Stade Sylvio Cator, Port-au-Prince
Referee: Dwight Royal (Jamaica)

April 17, 2015
16:00

USR (Guadeloupe)	2–2	(The Bahamas) Lyford Cay Dragons
Jacobs 69'; Nellis 72' (pen.)	Report	Dan 4'; Désert 33'

Stade Sylvio Cator, Port-au-Prince
Referee: José Kellys (Panama)
April 17, 2015
18:30

Don Bosco (Haiti)	5–1	(United States Virgin Islands) Helenites
Constant 28', 71', 85'; Estama 38'; Delva 79'	Report	St. Croix 26'

Stade Sylvio Cator, Port-au-Prince
Referee: Veralton Nembhard (Jamaica)

April 19, 2015
16:00

Lyford Cay Dragons (The Bahamas)	1–0	(United States Virgin Islands) Helenites
Traill 15'	Report

Stade Sylvio Cator, Port-au-Prince
Referee: Karl Tyrell (Jamaica)
April 19, 2015
18:30

Don Bosco (Haiti)	1–0	(Guadeloupe) USR
Saint Hubert 19'	Report

Stade Sylvio Cator, Port-au-Prince
Referee: Dwight Royal (Jamaica)

== Final round ==
In the final round, the four teams played matches on a knock-out basis, hosted by one of the teams at a centralized venue. The semi-final winners played in the final while the losers played in the third place match.

=== Bracket ===
- Hosted in Couva, Trinidad and Tobago (all times UTC−4).
- In the original fixtures published by the CFU, the winners of Groups 1 and 2 were to play in one semi-final, while the winners of Groups 3 and 4 were to play in the other semi-final. The semi-final matchups were changed by the CFU after the completion of the first round.

Semi-finals
(Haiti) Don Bosco	0 (1)
(Trinidad and Tobago) Central (p)	0 (3)
(Jamaica) Montego Bay United	0
(Trinidad and Tobago) W Connection	1

Final
(Trinidad and Tobago) Central	2
(Trinidad and Tobago) W Connection	1
Third place match
(Haiti) Don Bosco	0
(Jamaica) Montego Bay United	1

=== Semi-finals ===
Winners qualified for the 2015–16 CONCACAF Champions League.

May 22, 2015
18:00

Don Bosco (Haiti)	0–0 (a.e.t.)	(Trinidad and Tobago) Central
	Report
Penalties
Estama (penalty missed); Delva (penalty scored); Constant (penalty missed); Saint-Hubert (penalty missed)	1–3	(penalty scored) John; (penalty scored) Paul; (penalty missed) Benjamin; (penalty scored) Bentick

Ato Boldon Stadium, Couva
Referee: Karl Tyrell (Jamaica)

May 22, 2015
20:30

Montego Bay United (Jamaica)	0–1	(Trinidad and Tobago) W Connection
	Report	Arcia 70'

Ato Boldon Stadium, Couva
Referee: Adrian Skeete (Barbados)

=== Third place match ===
Winner qualified for the 2015–16 CONCACAF Champions League.

May 24, 2015
16:00

Don Bosco (Haiti)	0–1	(Jamaica) Montego Bay United
	Report	Gordon 70'

Ato Boldon Stadium, Couva
Referee: Kimbell Ward (Saint Kitts and Nevis)

=== Final ===
May 24, 2015
18:30

Central (Trinidad and Tobago)	2–1	(Trinidad and Tobago) W Connection
Rochford 27'; Jack 69'	Report	Benjamin 90+1'

Ato Boldon Stadium, Couva
Referee: Sherwin Moore (Guyana)

== Top goalscorers ==
Rank	Player	Team	Goals
1	(Trinidad and Tobago) Hashim Arcia	(Trinidad and Tobago) W Connection	7
2	(Haiti) Benchy Estama	(Haiti) Don Bosco	6
3	(Haiti) Monuma Constant Jr.	(Haiti) Don Bosco	4
4	(Trinidad and Tobago) Jerrel Britto	(Trinidad and Tobago) W Connection	3
4	(Suriname) Wensley Christoph	(Suriname) Excelsior	3
4	(Guyana) Delroy Fraser	Guyana Defence Force	3
4	(Trinidad and Tobago) Shahdon Winchester	(Trinidad and Tobago) W Connection	3
8	(Guadeloupe) Krismiller Bolmin	(Guadeloupe) Moulien	2
8	(Haiti) Kerlins Georges	(Haiti) Don Bosco	2
8	(Haiti) Kens Germain	(Haiti) América des Cayes	2
8	(Guadeloupe) Minnji Gomez	(Guadeloupe) Moulien	2
8	(Jamaica) Owayne Gordon	(Jamaica) Montego Bay United	2
8	(Trinidad and Tobago) Ataullah Guerra	(Trinidad and Tobago) Central	2
8	(Antigua and Barbuda) Tevaughn Harriette	(Antigua and Barbuda) SAP	2
8	(Jamaica) Fabian McCarthy	(Jamaica) Montego Bay United	2
8	(Haiti) Geel Pierre	(Haiti) América des Cayes	2
8	(Trinidad and Tobago) Willis Plaza	(Trinidad and Tobago) Central	2
