= Daron Beneby =

Bahamian footballer

Personal information
- Date of birth: 4 May 1984 (age 42)
- Place of birth: , Bahamas
- Position: Central defender

Senior career*
Years	Team	Apps	(Gls)
2013–	Bears		

International career^{‡}
2006–2008	Bahamas	8	(0)
- * Club domestic league appearances and goals ‡ National team caps and goals as of 31 March 2016

Daron Beneby (born 4 May 1984) is a Bahamian international soccer player, who plays as a midfielder for the Bahamas national team. He also is vice president of the Bears Football Club.

== International career ==
He made his international debut for Bahamas in a September 2006 Caribbean Cup qualification match against the Cayman Islands and has earned a total of 8 caps, scoring no goals. He has represented his country in 4 FIFA World Cup qualification matches.

He also plays for the national beach soccer team and earned a coaching license in 2014.
