= FA Cup (disambiguation) =

The FA Cup is the national knockout football tournament in England.

FA Cup may also refer to the following tournaments:

by country/territory

- Antigua and Barbuda FA Cup
- Australia Cup
- The Bahamas
  - Grand Bahama FA Cup
  - New Providence FA Cup
- Bahraini FA Cup
- Barbados FA Cup
- Bermuda FA Cup
- Brunei FA Cup
- Cayman Islands FA Cup
- Chinese FA Cup
- CTFA Cup (Chinese Taipei FA cup); see Chinese Taipei Football Association
- Ghana FA Cup
- Guam FA Cup
- Guernsey FA Cup
- Hong Kong FA Cup
- Iraq FA Cup
- Isle of Man FA Cup
- Jordan FA Cup
- Korean FA Cup
- Lebanese FA Cup
- Macedonian Football Cup
- Malaysia FA Cup
- Maldives FA Cup
- Namibia FA Cup
- Nigerian FA Cup
- Saint Lucia FA Cup
- Scottish Cup
- Senegal FA Cup
- Seychelles FA Cup
- Sierra Leonean FA Cup
- Sri Lanka FA Cup
- Tanzania FA Cup
- Thai FA Cup
- Turks and Caicos FA Cup
- Vanuatu Port Vila FA Cup
- Welsh Cup

== See also ==
- Women's FA Cup
