= Valin Bodie =

Bahamian footballer

Personal information
- Full name: Valin Lamar Danez Bodie
- Date of birth: 9 May 1995 (age 31)
- Place of birth: Nassau, Bahamas
- Position: Goalkeeper

Team information
- Current team: Cavalier FC

College career
Years	Team	Apps	(Gls)
2014–2018	Oral Roberts Golden Eagles		

Senior career*
Years	Team	Apps	(Gls)
2018–	Cavalier FC		

International career^{‡}
2018–	Bahamas	3	(0)
- * Club domestic league appearances and goals as of 17 January 2019 ‡ National team caps and goals as of 23 March 2019

Valin Lamar Danez Bodie (born 9 May 1995) is a Bahamian footballer who plays for the Bahamas national football team. Bodie played the 2021 UPSL season with Tulsa, Oklahoma-based Side 92 FC.

He is also a soil scientist who owns and operates Environmental Soil Solutions in Tulsa. He earned his Bachelor of Science degree with a concentration in Global Environmental Sustainability from Oral Roberts University, where he met his wife Keisha.

== International career ==
In July 2016, Bodie was called up to the Bahamas national beach soccer team. Bodie made his senior international debut for the Bahamas on 18 November 2018, playing all ninety minutes in a 1–1 home draw with Anguilla.
