= Lesly St. Fleur =

Bahamian footballer (born 1989)

Personal information
- Date of birth: 21 March 1989 (age 37)
- Place of birth: Haiti
- Height: 1.77 m (5 ft 10 in)
- Position: Forward

Team information
- Current team: Montego Bay United

Youth career
- Bears FC

Senior career*
Years	Team	Apps	(Gls)
2007–2010	Bears FC	53	(34)
2010	Milltown FC	13	(10)
2011	Sporting Central Academy	11	(3)
2011	Bears FC	12	(16)
2012–2020	Montego Bay United	139	(34)
2020–	Bears FC	39	(57)

International career^{‡}
- Bahamas U17
- Bahamas U20
2006–2024	Bahamas	39	(13)
2009–	Bahamas (beach)	6	(32)
- * Club domestic league appearances and goals as of 31 May 2025 ‡ National team caps and goals as of 26 May 2026

Lesly St. Fleur (born 21 March 1989) is a Bahamian international football player, who plays as a striker for BFA Senior League side Bears FC and is the all-time top goalscorer for the Bahamas national team.

== Club career ==
St. Fleur was born in Haiti, and has played his club football for Bears FC in the Bahamas. He briefly played for Jamaican side Sporting Central Academy in 2011, but left them to return to the Bahamas in November 2011 while joint top goalscorer of the team. He then returned to Jamaica in 2012 to play for Montego Bay United.

== International career ==
St. Fleur made his debut for the Bahamas in a September 2006 Caribbean Cup qualification match against the Cayman Islands and has, as of March 2016, earned a total of 12 caps, scoring 6 goals. He has represented his country in 7 FIFA World Cup qualification games. In a 2014 FIFA World Cup Qualifier in July 2011 the Bahamas beat Turks & Caicos Islands 6–0. Of the six goals scored by the national team, he scored an unbelievable five goals. This single match shot him to the top of the Bahamas' goal scoring charts with six goals. He has also represented the Bahamas in international beach soccer.

== Career statistics ==
=== Club ===
Club	Season	League			Cup		Continental		Other		Total	
Club	Season	Division	Apps	Goals	Apps	Goals	Apps	Goals	Apps	Goals	Apps	Goals
Bears FC	2005–06	BFA Senior League					—		—			
Bears FC	2006–07	BFA Senior League		13			—		—			
Bears FC	2007–08	BFA Senior League		7			—		—			
Bears FC	2008–09	BFA Senior League		15			—		—			
Bears FC	2009–10	BFA Senior League					—		—			
Bears FC	Total						0	0	0	0		
Milltown FC	2010	Canadian Soccer League	13	10	—		—		—		13	10
Bears FC	2010–11	BFA Senior League	12	16			—		—			
Sporting Central Academy	2011–12	Jamaica Premier League	11	3	—		—		—		11	3

=== International ===
As of match played 4 September 2024

National team	Year	Apps	Goals
Bahamas	2006	5	0
Bahamas	2007	0	0
Bahamas	2008	4	1
Bahamas	2009	0	0
Bahamas	2010	0	0
Bahamas	2011	2	5
Bahamas	2012	0	0
Bahamas	2013	0	0
Bahamas	2014	0	0
Bahamas	2015	1	0
Bahamas	2016	0	0
Bahamas	2017	0	0
Bahamas	2018	3	0
Bahamas	2019	4	4
Bahamas	2020	0	0
Bahamas	2021	3	0
Bahamas	2022	5	2
Bahamas	2023	6	0
Bahamas	2024	6	1
Total		39	13

==== International goals ====
Scores and results list Bahamas' goal tally first.

No.	Date	Venue	Opponent	Score	Result	Competition
1.	26 March 2008	Thomas Robinson Stadium, Nassau, Bahamas	British Virgin Islands	1–0	1–1	2010 FIFA World Cup qualification
2.	9 July 2011	Roscow A. L. Davies Soccer Field, Nassau, Bahamas	Turks and Caicos Islands	2–0	6–0	2014 FIFA World Cup qualification
3.	9 July 2011	Roscow A. L. Davies Soccer Field, Nassau, Bahamas	Turks and Caicos Islands	3–0	6–0	2014 FIFA World Cup qualification
4.	9 July 2011	Roscow A. L. Davies Soccer Field, Nassau, Bahamas	Turks and Caicos Islands	4–0	6–0	2014 FIFA World Cup qualification
5.	9 July 2011	Roscow A. L. Davies Soccer Field, Nassau, Bahamas	Turks and Caicos Islands	5–0	6–0	2014 FIFA World Cup qualification
6.	9 July 2011	Roscow A. L. Davies Soccer Field, Nassau, Bahamas	Turks and Caicos Islands	6–0	6–0	2014 FIFA World Cup qualification
7.	16 March 2019	Thomas Robinson Stadium, Nassau, Bahamas	Turks and Caicos Islands	6–1	6–1	Friendly
8.	10 October 2019	Warner Park, Basseterre, Saint Kitts and Nevis	British Virgin Islands	1–0	4–0	2019–20 CONCACAF Nations League C
9.	10 October 2019	Warner Park, Basseterre, Saint Kitts and Nevis	British Virgin Islands	2–0	4–0	2019–20 CONCACAF Nations League C
10.	14 November 2019	Thomas Robinson Stadium, Nassau, Bahamas	British Virgin Islands	2–0	3–0	2019–20 CONCACAF Nations League C
11.	12 May 2022	Thomas Robinson Stadium, Nassau, Bahamas	Turks and Caicos Islands	3–1	4–2	Friendly
12.	3 June 2022	Thomas Robinson Stadium, Nassau, Bahamas	Saint Vincent and the Grenadines	1–0	1–0	2022–23 CONCACAF Nations League B
13.	4 September 2024	Bethlehem Soccer Stadium, Upper Bethlehem, United States Virgin Islands	U.S. Virgin Islands	1–0	3–3	2024-25 CONCACAF Nations League C
