= GBFL =

GBFL may refer to:

- Grand Bahama Football League, the highest form of association football on the Bahamian island of Grand Bahama
- Great Belt Fixed Link, a multi-element fixed link crossing the Great Belt strait between the Danish islands of Zealand and Funen
