= FRFC =

The initialism FRFC (or a variation such as F&R FC) may stand for:

== Sports teams ==
=== Association football (soccer) ===
F.C. = Football Club or Fútbol Club

- Fall River F.C. (1922–1931), Fall River, Massachusetts, USA
- Fall River F.C. (1932), Fall River, Massachusetts, USA
  - See also Fall River Soccer Club (disambiguation)
- Farleigh Rovers F.C. (1922–), Warlingham, Surrey, England
- Finance and Revenue F.C. (1924–2009?), Myanmar/Burma (also known as Mountain Lion FC, and formerly as Rangoon Customs)
- Fishwick Ramblers F.C. (1875–1891), Preston, Lancashire, England
- Fleetside Rovers F.C. (1901–1913), Gatehouse of Fleet, Kirkcudbrightshire, Scotland
- Fleetwood Rangers F.C. (1883–1899), Fleetwood, Fylde Coast, Lancashire, England
- Flight Refuelling F.C. (1949–), Merley, Poole, Dorset, England (the pre-2001 name of Cobham Sports Football Club)
- Florida Roots Futbol Club (2021–), USA, a team in the Men's Premier Soccer League (MPSL) or National Premier Soccer League (NPSL)
- Forest Rangers F.C. (1975–), Ndola, Zambia (nicknamed Fole Malembe)
- Forest Row F.C. (1892–), Forest Row, East Sussex, England (nicknamed Frow)
- Freeport R.F.C. (1965–), Freeport, Bahamas
- Furia Roja F.C. (2007–), Jesús María, Jalisco, Mexico

=== Australian rules football ===
- Forest Range Football Club (1902–1967), a predecessor of the Uraidla Districts Football Club, eastern suburbs of Adelaide, South Australia

=== Rugby union ===
RFC = Rugby Football Club

- Falkirk RFC (1972–), Falkirk, Scotland
- Falmouth RFC (1873–), Falmouth, Cornwall, England
- Felinfoel RFC (1876–), Felinfoel, Llanelli, Wales
- Farnborough RFC (?), Farnborough, Hampshire, England (the 2017–2018 winner of the Hampshire Plate)
- Ferndale RFC (1882–1921, 1989–), Upper Rhondda Fach, Wales
- Finchley RFC (1925–), Finchley, Barnet, London, England
- Flamingoes F.C. (1866–1877, 2024–), Battersea Park, London, England
- Forrester RFC (1964–), South Gyle Access, Edinburgh, Scotland
- Fraserburgh RFC (2014–), Fraserburgh, Scotland
- Fylde RFC (1919–), Lytham St. Annes, Lancashire, England (AKA Fylde Rugby Union Club)

== Other uses ==
- First Regiment Fencible Cavalry (AKA Light Dragoons; 1794–1800) and Lord Jocelyn's First Regiment of Fencible Cavalry (1795–), British fencible regiments
- Franklin Richar Flores Córdova (1979–), a Bolivian politician, trade unionist, and former student leader
- Fred Records French Connection, releases of previously unreleased material from Fred Frith's archive recorded in France
