= Freeport R.F.C. =

Bahamanian football club

- Full name: Freeport Rugby Football Club
- Founded: 1965
- Ground: Grand Bahama Stadium; Freeport, Bahamas
- Capacity: 3,100
- League: Grand Bahama Football League
Home colours

Freeport Rugby Football Club are one of the five men's football teams in the Grand Bahama Football League, representing their home city of Freeport, Bahamas.

The annual winner of the Grand Bahamas League flies to the capital Nassau to play a triangle tournament with the winner of the Abaco League and the New Providence League to find the National Champion of Bahamas title. In the last years for organisational reason the triangle-tournament was not played. So the national champions were automatically the three winners of the three leagues.

== Achievements ==
- Bahamas National Championship Final: 1

1996

- Grand Bahama Football League: 1

1996
