= Anton Sealey =

Bahamian footballer

Personal information
- Full name: Anton D. Justin Sealey II
- Date of birth: November 19, 1991 (age 34)
- Place of birth: Nassau, Bahamas
- Height: 6 ft 2 in (1.88 m)
- Position: Defender

Youth career
- 2009–2010: Lonestar SC Academy

College career
Years	Team	Apps	(Gls)
2010–2011	North Carolina Tar Heels	1	(0)
2012–2014	UCF Knights	39	(0)

Senior career*
Years	Team	Apps	(Gls)
2011	Reading United	1	(0)
2012	Orlando City U-23	1	(0)

International career^{‡}
- Bahamas U17
2011–2016	Bahamas	3	(0)
- * Club domestic league appearances and goals as of June 11, 2012 ‡ National team caps and goals as of 3 April 2016

Anton D. Justin Sealey II (born November 19, 1991, in Nassau, Bahamas) is a Bahamian retired footballer who played college soccer for the University of North Carolina and the University of Central Florida. He is currently the president of the Bahamas Football Association.

== Club career ==
Sealey transferred to the University of Central Florida for the 2012 school year and also plays in the USL Premier Development League for Orlando City U-23.

== International career ==
He made his international debut for the Bahamas in a July 2011 FIFA World Cup qualification match against the Turks and Caicos Islands and has, as of April 2016, earned a total of 3 caps, scoring no goals. All of his caps were won in FIFA World Cup qualification matches.
