= 2000 CFU Women's Caribbean Cup =

2000 CFU Women's Championship
Tournament details
- Host countries: Haiti; St. Lucia
- Dates: 30 April 2000– 18 November 2000
- Teams: 12 (from 1 sub-confederation)
- Venues: 2 (in 2 host cities)

Final positions
- Champions: Haiti (1st title)
- Runners-up: Saint Lucia
- Third place: Suriname
- Fourth place: Saint Vincent and the Grenadines

The 2000 Caribbean Football Union Women's Championship was the inaugural Women's international football tournament to take place in the Caribbean region. The tournament was organised by the Caribbean Football Union.

Thirteen countries entered the competition, although co-hosts Trinidad and Tobago withdrew before playing a game.

== Participants ==
- Bahamas
- Bermuda
- British Virgin Islands
- Cayman Islands
- Dominica
- Guadeloupe
- Haiti
- Jamaica
- Martinique
- Saint Lucia
- Saint Vincent and the Grenadines
- Suriname
- Trinidad and Tobago

== Preliminary round ==
30 April 2000

Saint Vincent and the Grenadines	5–0	Dominica

28 May 2000

Dominica	0–4	Saint Vincent and the Grenadines

23 April 2000

Bermuda	3–0	Bahamas

7 May 2000

Bahamas	0–6	Bermuda

30 April 2000

Guadeloupe	3–0	Martinique

21 May 2000

Martinique	5–0	Guadeloupe

7 May 2000

Cayman Islands	0–4	Jamaica

9 May 2000

Cayman Islands	0–8	Jamaica

21 May 2000

Saint Lucia	8–0	British Virgin Islands

28 May 2000

British Virgin Islands	0–13	Saint Lucia

== Group stage ==
The group stage was referred to as the 'semi final round'.

=== Group 1 ===
Original scheduled to take place between 12–16 July 2000, the group games took place in August.

- Martinique withdrew
9 August 2000

Haiti	3–0	Bermuda

11 August 2000

Jamaica	4–1	Bermuda

13 August 2000

Haiti	1–0	Jamaica

Team	Pld	W	D	L	GF	GA	GD	Pts
Haiti	2	2	0	0	4	0	+4	6
Jamaica	2	1	0	1	4	2	+2	3
Bermuda	2	0	0	2	1	7	−6	0

=== Group 2 ===
Originally scheduled for 11–16 August and to be hosted in Trinidad & Tobago. Group 2 was cancelled. Instead a "Final Round" would occur in place of Group 2 and the Final.

The teams drawn in this group were:

- Saint Lucia
- Saint Vincent and the Grenadines
- Suriname
- Trinidad and Tobago

== Final round ==
The games took place in November 2000 in Castries, St. Lucia.

14 November 2000

Haiti	3–1	Suriname

14 November 2000

Saint Lucia	6–2	Saint Vincent and the Grenadines

16 November 2000

Haiti	3–0	Saint Vincent and the Grenadines

16 November 2000

Saint Lucia	1–1	Suriname

18 November 2000

Saint Lucia	1–3	Haiti

18 November 2000

Suriname	3–0	Saint Vincent and the Grenadines

Team	Pld	W	D	L	GF	GA	GD	Pts
Haiti	3	3	0	0	9	2	+7	9
Saint Lucia	3	1	1	1	8	6	+2	4
Suriname	3	1	1	1	5	4	+1	4
Saint Vincent and the Grenadines	3	0	0	3	2	12	−10	0

== See also ==
- CFU Women's Caribbean Cup
  - 2014 CFU Women's Caribbean Cup
