= 2009 CONCACAF Beach Soccer Championship =

Tournament details
- Host country: Mexico
- Dates: 17–21 June
- Teams: 6
- Venue: 1 (in 1 host city)

Final positions
- Champions: El Salvador (1st title)
- Runners-up: Costa Rica
- Third place: Mexico
- Fourth place: United States

Tournament statistics
- Matches played: 11
- Goals scored: 87 (7.91 per match)
- Top scorer(s): (El Salvador) José Agustín Ruiz (8 goals)

The 2009 CONCACAF Beach Soccer Championship, also known as the 2009 FIFA Beach Soccer World Cup qualifiers for (CONCACAF), was a qualifying tournament held during June 17 – 21, 2009 in Puerto Vallarta, Mexico that determined which two participants will represent the CONCACAF region at the 2009 FIFA Beach Soccer World Cup. It was originally scheduled to be between April 29 and May 3, 2009, however, Shortly before the tournament started, it was announced that it would be postponed indefinitely due to the growing concerns of the 2009 swine flu pandemic in the country.

== Participating teams ==
North American Zone:

- Canada
- Mexico
- United States

Central American Zone:

- Costa Rica
- El Salvador

Caribbean Zone:

- Bahamas

== Format ==
The six nation tournament consisted of two three-team groups. The teams played each other once in their group during the group stage, meaning each team played two games during the group stage. The top two teams in each group advanced to the semifinals. The semifinal winners qualified for the 2009 FIFA Beach Soccer World Cup and contest the CONCACAF title.

== Group stage ==
=== Group A ===
| Team | Pld | W | D | L | GF | GA | GD | Pts |
|---|---|---|---|---|---|---|---|---|
| Mexico | 2 | 2 | 0 | 0 | 14 | 1 | +13 | 6 |
| El Salvador | 2 | 1 | 0 | 1 | 9 | 10 | −1 | 3 |
| Canada | 2 | 0 | 0 | 2 | 6 | 18 | −12 | 0 |

17 June 2009
18:15

| Mexico | 10 – 0 | Canada |
|---|---|---|
| Villabobos 1', 27'; Rosales 8', 13', 20'; Flores 9', 17', 27', 36', Rodriguez 24' | Report |

Unidad Deportivo Municipal Agustin Flores, Puerto Vallarta

18 June 2009
18:15

| El Salvador | 8 – 6 | Canada |
|---|---|---|
| Ruiz 3', 4', 17'; Zavalava 9', 28'; Lobos 13'; Hernández 18'; Velásquez 26' | Report | Yamada 14', 14', 24', 26', Lemire 17', Dhaliwal 18' |

Unidad Deportivo Municipal Agustin Flores, Puerto Vallarta

19 June 2009
18:15

| Mexico | 4 – 1 | El Salvador |
|---|---|---|
| Rosales 1', 7'; Rodríguez 14'; Navarette 26' | Report | Ruiz 31' |

Unidad Deportivo Municipal Agustin Flores, Puerto Vallarta

=== Group B ===
| Team | Pld | W | D | L | GF | GA | GD | Pts |
|---|---|---|---|---|---|---|---|---|
| United States | 2 | 2 | 0 | 0 | 12 | 3 | +9 | 6 |
| Costa Rica | 2 | 1 | 0 | 1 | 4 | 6 | −2 | 3 |
| Bahamas | 2 | 0 | 0 | 2 | 2 | 9 | −7 | 0 |

17 June 2009
17:00

| United States | 6 – 2 | Bahamas |
|---|---|---|
| Chimienti 2', 13', 34'; Taguinod 11'; Morales 15', 22' | Report | St.Fleur 1', 21' |

Unidad Deportivo Municipal Agustin Flores, Puerto Vallarta

18 June 2009
17:00

| Costa Rica | 3 – 0 | Bahamas |
|---|---|---|
| Angulo 15'; Jimenez 22'; Mora 32' | Report |

Unidad Deportivo Municipal Agustin Flores, Puerto Vallarta

19 June 2009
17:00

| United States | 6 – 1 | Costa Rica |
|---|---|---|
| Morales 5', 8', 16'; Farberoff 10'; Xexeo 28', 35' | Report | Sterling 2' |

Unidad Deportivo Municipal Agustin Flores, Puerto Vallarta

== Fifth place ==
20 June 2009
15:45

| Canada | 4 – 3 | Bahamas |
|---|---|---|
| Yamada 9', 13', 17'; Miniaci 34' | Report | St.Fleur 10'; Hanna 21'; Christie 22' |

Unidad Deportivo Municipal Agustin Flores, Puerto Vallarta

== Knockout stage ==
Semi-finals
A1 | Mexico | 3
B2 | Costa Rica (a.e.t.) | 4
B1 | United States | 3
A2 | El Salvador | 5

Final
SF1 | Costa Rica | 3
SF2 | El Salvador | 6
3rd/4th-place match
SF1 | Mexico | 5
SF2 | United States | 4

=== Semi-finals ===
20 June 2009

| United States | 3 – 5 | El Salvador |
|---|---|---|
| Xexeo 6', 33'; Morales 23' | Report | Ruiz 3', 4', 34'; Velásquez 9', 32' |

Unidad Deportivo Municipal Agustin Flores, Puerto Vallarta

20 June 2009

| Mexico | 3 – 4 (a.e.t.) | Costa Rica |
|---|---|---|
| Rodriguez 12'; Flores 22' | Report | Sterling 9', 31' |
Penalties
| Villalobos (penalty scored); Rosales (penalty missed) | 1 – 2 | Chavarría (penalty scored); Mora (penalty scored) |

Unidad Deportivo Municipal Agustin Flores, Puerto Vallarta

=== Third Place ===
21 June 2009
17:00

| United States | 4 - 5 | Mexico |
|---|---|---|
| Futagaki 17'; Taguinod 25'; Farberoff 28'; Morales 29' | Report | Lopez 14'; Rosales 17', 18'; Villalobos 18' |

Unidad Deportivo Municipal Agustin Flores, Puerto Vallarta

=== Final ===
21 June 2009
17:00

| Costa Rica | 3 − 6 | El Salvador |
|---|---|---|
| Pacheco 11' , 15', 25' | Report | Garay 10'; Hernández 16', 16'; Ruiz 20'; Torres 21'; Velásquez 32' |

Unidad Deportivo Municipal Agustin Flores, Puerto Vallarta

== Winners ==
2009 Concacaf Beach Soccer winners

El Salvador
First title

== Qualified Teams ==
- Costa Rica
- El Salvador

== Awards ==
| Leading Scorer | Best Goalkeeper | Most Valuable Player |
|---|---|---|
| (El Salvador) Agustín Ruiz | (El Salvador) José Portillo | (Costa Rica) Richard Sterling |

== Top scorers ==
8 goals

- (El Salvador) José (Agustín Ruíz)

7 goals

- (United States) Morales
- (Mexico) Rosales
- (Canada) Yamada

5 goals

- (Mexico) Flores

4 goals

- (El Salvador) Frank Velásquez
- (United States) Xexeo

== Final standing ==
| Rank | Team |
|---|---|
| 1 | El Salvador |
| 2 | Costa Rica |
| 3 | Mexico |
| 4 | United States |
| 5 | Canada |
| 6 | Bahamas |
