= Bahamas national beach soccer team =

National sports team

Bahamas
- Association: Bahamas Football Association
- Confederation: CONCACAF (Caribbean)
- Head coach: Francis Farberoff
- Captain: Nesley Jean
- Top scorer: Lesly St. Fleur
- FIFA code: BAH
- BSWW ranking: 36 ▼4 (1 June 2026)
First colours
Second colours

Biggest win
- 12-2 against Bonaire in 2019

World Cup
- Appearances: 1 (first in 2017)
- Best result: Tenth place (2017)

CONCACAF Beach Soccer Championship
- Appearances: 9 (first in 2009)
- Best result: Fourth Place (2025)

The Bahamas national beach soccer team represents The Bahamas in international beach soccer competitions and is controlled by the Bahamas Football Association, the governing body for football in the Bahamas.

== Current squad ==
Note: Flags indicate national team as defined under FIFA eligibility rules; some limited exceptions apply. Players may hold more than one non-FIFA nationality.

No.	Pos.	Nation	Player
1	GK	BAH	Julio Jameson
2	DF	BAH	Jean Francois
3	DF	BAH	Mark Daniels
4	DF	BAH	Renardo McCallum
5	DF	BAH	Kyle Williams
6	FW	BAH	Gary Joeseph
7	DF	BAH	Nesley Jean

No.	Pos.	Nation	Player
8	DF	BAH	Dwayne Forbes
9	FW	BAH	Daron Beneby
10	FW	BAH	Lesly St.Fleur
11	FW	BAH	Gavin Christie
12	GK	BAH	Ivan Rolle
13	GK	BAH	Valin Bodie
14	GK	BAH	Torin Ferguson

== Current staff ==
- National Team Manager: Jason McDowall
- Coach: Francis Farberoff
- Assistant Coach: Wilson DaCosta

== Achievements ==
The Bahamas national beach soccer team has competed in multiple editions of the CONCACAF Beach Soccer Championship, the region's premier beach soccer tournament and qualifier for the FIFA Beach Soccer World Cup.

- CONCACAF Beach Soccer Championship Best: Fourth Place
  - 2009, 2011, 2013, 2015, 2017, 2019, 2021, 2023, 2025: The Bahamas has demonstrated notable consistency, reaching at least fourth place in every edition of the championship from 2009 to 2025. Their standout performance in 2023, hosted at the Malcolm Park Beach Soccer Facility in Nassau, saw them advance to the semifinals—marking their best historical finish in the tournament up to that point—before finishing fourth. In 2025, also hosted in Nassau from March 11-16, they again secured fourth place.
- FIFA Beach Soccer World Cup Bahamas 2025 Finish: Fourth Place
  - Bahamas hosted the 2017 FIFA Beach Soccer World Cup in Nassau, where they earned a group-stage win but did not progress as far, being eliminated in round 1.
