= UB Mingoes =

- University: University of the Bahamas
- Nickname: Mingoes
- None: None
- Conference: None
- Athletic director: Kimberley Rolle
- Location: Nassau, Bahamas
- Varsity teams: 6 intercollegiate sports
- Mascot: Mingoe, the flamingo
- Website: www.ub.edu.bs/student-life/university-athletics/

The UB Mingoes are the varsity intercollegiate athletic programs of the University of the Bahamas. The program has six clubs and is aiming to join the National Association of Intercollegiate Athletics.

== History ==
On February 28, 2017 the Government of the Bahamas announced the Mingoes as the university's name and revealed the mascot. The goal of the program is to join the NAIA.

The men's soccer team won the BFA Senior League title in 2017–18.

== Teams ==
- Men Track & Field
- Women's Track & Field
- Men's Soccer
- Men's Basketball
- Women's Volleyball
- Women's Softball
