= Bahamas national football team =

The Bahamas
- Nickname: The Baha Boyz
- Association: Bahamas Football Association (BFA)
- Confederation: CONCACAF (North America)
- Sub-confederation: CFU (Caribbean)
- Head coach: Gifton Noel-Williams
- Captain: Marcel Joseph
- Most caps: Lesly St. Fleur (45)
- Top scorer: Lesly St. Fleur (14)
- Home stadium: Thomas Robinson Stadium
- FIFA code: BAH
| First colours | Second colours | Third colours |

FIFA ranking
- Current: 208 ▼1 (7 October 2026)
- Highest: 138 (September 2006)
- Lowest: 210 (September 2018 – July 2019)

First international
- Jamaica 8–1 Bahamas (Kingston, Jamaica; 17 July 1965)

Biggest win
- Bahamas 6–0 Turks and Caicos Islands (Nassau, Bahamas; 9 July 2011)

Biggest defeat
- Mexico 13–0 Bahamas (Toluca, Mexico; 28 April 1987)

The Bahamas national football team represents The Bahamas in men's international football, and is governed by the Bahamas Football Association, the governing body for football in the Bahamas founded in 1967. It has been a full member of FIFA since 1968, a full member of CONCACAF since 1981, and is also a member of CFU in the Caribbean Zone.

The Bahamas has never qualified for the FIFA World Cup and the CONCACAF Gold Cup, but has participated twice in League B and three times in League C of the CONCACAF Nations League.

The Bahamas' debut in international competitions was in the 1970 Central American and Caribbean Games, and its first appearance in World Cup qualifiers was for 2002 qualification. The team's first victory was in 1971 by defeating Dominican Republic 4–2.

== History ==
On 17 July 1965, The Bahamas played their first international match, in a friendly against Jamaica, losing 8–1 in Kingston. The team played their first official international matches in the 1970 Central American and Caribbean Games, losing their debut 3–0 against Puerto Rico, an 8–1 loss against Netherlands Antilles and 5–0 to Venezuela. They did manage to get their first draw though, a 2–2 result against Dominican Republic. The following year, Bahamas participated in the 1971 Pan American Games, achieving their first victory over Dominican Republic 4–2, but failing to exit the group stages. They returned to play in the 1974 Central American and Caribbean Games, and managed a historic 1–0 victory against Panama, but lost 3–0 to Bermuda and 2–0 to the Dominican Republic and was eliminated again in the first round.

Bahamas finished bottom of their group in the 1982 Central American and Caribbean Games and in the 1986 edition, they were given a bye into the quarterfinals due to a withdrawal, however Bahamas were beaten by Cuba and eliminated. They also participated in the qualifying rounds for the 1984 Olympic Games (eliminated by an amateur Mexico team) and the 1988 Olympics (beaten by Guyana). On 28 April 1987, the Bahamas experienced their worst defeat at the hands of the Mexican team, who crushed them 13–0 as part of the qualifying tournament for the 1987 Pan American Games.

In the 1990s, the Bahamas withdrew from 1998 World Cup qualifying, leaving Saint Kitts and Nevis to advance to the next round. Bahamas advanced past the preliminary round 1999 Caribbean Cup, but failed to beat Bermuda (0–6), Cuba (0–7) and the Cayman Islands (1–4) and finished last in their group.

The 2000s saw the Baha Boyz enter three consecutive World Cup qualifiers; 2002, 2006 and 2010 being eliminated by Haiti (aggregate score 13–0), Dominica (aggregate score 4–2) and Jamaica (aggregate score 13–0), respectively. In the 2007 Caribbean Cup they got through the first knockout round but finished in last position in the second qualifying round behind Barbados, Saint Vincent and Bermuda.

In the 2014 World Cup qualifiers, the Bahamas thrashed the Turks and Caicos Islands with an aggregate score of 10–0, advancing to the second phase however, the team withdrew from the competition as the renovations for the Thomas Robinson Stadium were not completed and playing the fixtures at neutral venues would have been financially prohibitive. In the 2018 World Cup qualifying, they faced Bermuda in the first round, losing 8–0 on aggregate. In the first round of 2022 World Cup qualification, Bahamas failed to score a goal, finishing in last place, having conceded 15.

== Results and fixtures ==
The following is a list of match results in the last 12 months, as well as any future matches that have been scheduled.

Win Draw Loss Fixture

=== 2025 ===
| 12 November 2025–26 CONCACAF Series | Bahamas | 1–2 | Anguilla | George Town, Cayman Islands |
| 16:30 UTC−5 | Bayles 52' (pen.) | Report | Connor 11'; Jackson 87' | Stadium: Truman Bodden Sports Complex; Referee: Micah Erskine (Guyana) |

| 15 November 2025–26 CONCACAF Series | Bahamas | 0–6 | British Virgin Islands | George Town, Cayman Islands |
| 16:30 UTC−5 | | Report | Splatt 5', 41', 52'; Samadi 44'; Javier 50'; Chalwell 72' | Stadium: Truman Bodden Sports Complex; Referee: Shavin Greene (Guyana) |

=== 2026 ===
| 26 March 2025–26 CONCACAF Series | Bahamas | 1–3 | Anguilla | George Town, Cayman Islands |
| 16:30 UTC−5 | Holcombe 15' | Report | Tesselaar 43', 52' (pen.); Guishard 83' | Stadium: Truman Bodden Sports Complex; Referee: Renlee Napoleon (Saint Lucia) |

| 29 March 2025–26 CONCACAF Series | Cayman Islands | 1–0 | Bahamas | George Town, Cayman Islands |
| 19:00 UTC−5 | Kelly 59' (o.g.) | Report | | Stadium: Truman Bodden Sports Complex; Referee: Tristley Bassue (St. Kitts and Nevis) |

| 23 September 2026–27 CONCACAF Nations League C | Bahamas | 0–8 | Saint Martin | Upper Bethlehem, U.S. Virgin Islands |
| 16:00 UTC−4 | | Report | Raga 15', 52', 63' (pen.); Alexandre 20', 32'; Montantin 23'; Butler 41' (o.g.); Arné 80' | Stadium: Bethlehem Soccer Stadium; Referee: Vimarest Díaz (Dominican Republic) |

| 29 September 2026–27 CONCACAF Nations League C | U.S. Virgin Islands | 3–1 | Bahamas | Upper Bethlehem, U.S. Virgin Islands |
| 16:00 UTC−4 | St. Louis 14'; Joseph 45+3'; Armour 62' | Report | Rahming 68' | Stadium: Bethlehem Soccer Stadium; Attendance: 332; Referee: Okeito Nicholson (Jamaica) |

| 4 October 2026–27 CONCACAF Nations League C | Bahamas | v | U.S. Virgin Islands | Upper Bethlehem, U.S. Virgin Islands |
| 16:00 UTC−4 | | Report | | Stadium: Bethlehem Soccer Stadium |

| 6 October 2026–27 CONCACAF Nations League C | Saint Martin | v | Bahamas | Upper Bethlehem, U.S. Virgin Islands |
| 16:00 UTC−4 | | Report | | Stadium: Bethlehem Soccer Stadium |

== Coaching history ==
- (The Bahamas) Randy Rogers (1987-1998)
- (England) Peter Wilson (1998–1999)
- (England) Gary White (1999–2006)
- (Brazil) Neider dos Santos (2006–2010)
- (Guyana) Paul James (2011)
- (The Bahamas) Kevin Davies (2011–2014)
- (The Bahamas) Nesley Jean (2014)
- (The Bahamas) Dion Godet (2014–2018)
- (The Bahamas) Nesley Jean (2019–2024)
- (The Bahamas) Kevin Davies (2025-2026)
- (England) Gifton Noel-Williams (2026-present)

== Players ==
=== Current squad ===
The following players were called up for the 2026 CONCACAF Series matches against Anguilla and Cayman Islands on 26 and 29 March 2026.

Caps and goals correct as of 30 March 2026, after the match against Cayman Islands

| No. | Pos. | Player | Date of birth (age) | Caps | Goals | Club |
|---|---|---|---|---|---|---|
| | GK | Michael Butler | 2 March 1999 (age 27) | 11 | 0 | (Bahamas Football Association) Inter Nassau |
| | GK | Vance Wheaton | 4 April 2005 (age 21) | 9 | 0 | (Bahamas Football Association) Renegades FC |
| | DF | Miguel Thompson | 8 July 2001 (age 25) | 5 | 0 | (Bahamas Football Association) Dynamos FC |
| | DF | Junior Kelly | 17 August 2005 (age 21) | 5 | 0 | (Bahamas Football Association) UB Mingoes |
| | DF | Lamond Cross | 19 February 2005 (age 21) | 4 | 0 | (Bahamas Football Association) Future Stars FC |
| | DF | Justin Minns | 26 May 2002 (age 24) | 3 | 0 | (Bahamas Football Association) UB Mingoes |
| | DF | Prince Cooper | 3 April 2007 (age 19) | 2 | 0 | (Bahamas Football Association) Dynamos FC |
| | DF | Jamario Charles | 12 November 2001 (age 24) | 2 | 0 | (Bahamas Football Association) UB Mingoes |
| | DF | Creven Ferguson | 13 April 2003 (age 23) | 1 | 0 | (Bahamas Football Association) Renegades FC |
| | MF | Christopher Rahming | 27 April 1999 (age 27) | 18 | 1 | (Romanian Football Federation) Olimpia Satu Mare |
| | MF | Re'john Ene | 27 June 1996 (age 30) | 5 | 0 | (Bahamas Football Association) Dynamos FC |
| | MF | Dylan Archer | 22 November 2008 (age 17) | 3 | 0 | (Bahamas Football Association) Renegades FC |
| | MF | Dwyane Taylor | 31 July 1998 (age 28) | 2 | 0 | (Bahamas Football Association) Dynamos FC |
| | MF | Deron Ferguson | 11 September 2006 (age 20) | 2 | 0 | (Bahamas Football Association) Western Warriors |
| | MF | Keno Thomas | 18 November 2007 (age 18) | 2 | 0 | (Bahamas Football Association) UB Mingoes |
| | FW | Nahum Johnson | 10 July 2006 (age 20) | 10 | 1 | (Bahamas Football Association) Renegades FC |
| | FW | Lothario Milfrise | 14 March 2003 (age 23) | 4 | 0 | (Canadian Soccer Association) Douglas Royals |
| | FW | Joshua Johnson | 19 March 2003 (age 23) | 3 | 0 | (Bahamas Football Association) UB Mingoes |
| | FW | Robert Holcombe | 24 February 2007 (age 19) | 2 | 1 | (Bahamas Football Association) Baha Juniors |

=== Recent call-ups ===
The following players have also been called up for the team within the last 12 months and are still eligible to represent.

| Pos. | Player | Date of birth (age) | Caps | Goals | Club | Latest call-up |

== Player records ==
As of 25 May 2026
Players in bold are still active with Bahamas.

=== Most appearances ===
| Rank | Player | Caps | Goals | Career |
|---|---|---|---|---|
| 1 | Lesly St. Fleur | 39 | 13 | 2006–2024 |
| 2 | **Wood Julmis** | 20 | 6 | 2021–present |
| 3 | **Chris Rahming** | 18 | 1 | 2018–present |
| 3 | **Marcel Joseph** | 18 | 3 | 2018–present |
| 5 | Cameron Hepple | 17 | 1 | 2004–2021 |
| 5 | **William Bayles** | 17 | 1 | 2022–present |
| 5 | Happy Hall | 17 | 2 | 2006–2021 |
| 8 | Quinton Carey | 16 | 2 | 2019–2024 |
| 8 | **Jonathan Miller** | 16 | 0 | 2018–present |
| 8 | Dwayne Whylly | 16 | 0 | 2004–2019 |

=== Top goalscorers ===
| Rank | Player | Goals | Caps | Ratio | Career |
|---|---|---|---|---|---|
| 1 | Lesly St. Fleur | 13 | 39 | 0.33 | 2006–2024 |
| 2 | **Brandon Adderley** | 6 | 9 | 0.67 | 2022–present |
| 2 | Nesley Jean | 6 | 14 | 0.43 | 2004–2018 |
| 2 | **Wood Julmis** | 6 | 20 | 0.3 | 2021–present |
| 5 | Terry Delancy | 3 | 13 | 0.23 | 2015–2021 |
| 5 | **Marcel Joseph** | 3 | 18 | 0.17 | 2018–present |
| 7 | Kevin Davies | 2 | 4 | 0.5 | 2000 |
| 7 | Anton Haven | 2 | 4 | 0.5 | 2000 |
| 7 | Ryan Moseley | 2 | 5 | 0.4 | 2006 |
| 7 | **Quinton Carey** | 2 | 16 | 0.13 | 2019–present |
| 7 | Happy Hall | 2 | 17 | 0.16 | 2006–2021 |

== Competitive record ==
=== FIFA World Cup ===
| FIFA World Cup record | | | | | | | | | | Qualification record | | | | | |
| Year | Round | Pos. | Pld | W | D | L | GF | GA | Squad | Pld | W | D | L | GF | GA |
|---|---|---|---|---|---|---|---|---|---|---|---|---|---|---|---|
| 1930 to 1966 | Part of United Kingdom | | | | | | | | | Part of United Kingdom | | | | | |
| 1970 to 1994 | Did not participate | | | | | | | | | Declined participation | | | | | |
| (France) 1998 | Withdrew | | | | | | | | | Withdrew | | | | | |
| (South Korea) (Japan) 2002 | Did not qualify | | | | | | | | | 4 | 2 | 0 | 2 | 5 | 15 |
| (Germany) 2006 | Did not qualify | | | | | | | | | 2 | 0 | 1 | 1 | 2 | 4 |
| (South Africa) 2010 | Did not qualify | | | | | | | | | 4 | 0 | 2 | 2 | 3 | 16 |
| (Brazil) 2014 | Withdrew during the qualifiers | | | | | | | | | 2 | 2 | 0 | 0 | 10 | 0 |
| (Russia) 2018 | Did not qualify | | | | | | | | | 2 | 0 | 0 | 2 | 0 | 8 |
| (Qatar) 2022 | Did not qualify | | | | | | | | | 4 | 0 | 1 | 3 | 0 | 15 |
| (Canada) (Mexico) (United States) 2026 | Did not qualify | | | | | | | | | 4 | 0 | 0 | 4 | 1 | 22 |
| (Morocco) (Portugal) (Spain) 2030 | To be determined | | | | | | | | | To be determined | | | | | |
| (Saudi Arabia) 2034 | To be determined | | | | | | | | | To be determined | | | | | |
| Total | — | 0/7 | — | | | | | | | 22 | 4 | 4 | 14 | 21 | 80 |

=== CONCACAF Gold Cup ===
CONCACAF Championship / Gold Cup record
| Year | Round | Pos. | Pld | W | D | L | GF | GA | Squad |
|---|---|---|---|---|---|---|---|---|---|
| 1963 to 1969 | Part of United Kingdom | | | | | | | | |
| 1971 to 1998 | Did not participate | | | | | | | | |
| (United States) 2000 | Did not qualify | | | | | | | | |
| (United States) 2002 | Withdrew | | | | | | | | |
| (Mexico) (United States) 2003 | Did not participate | | | | | | | | |
| (United States) 2005 | Withdrew | | | | | | | | |
| (United States) 2007 | Did not qualify | | | | | | | | |
| 2009 to 2017 | Did not participate | | | | | | | | |
| 2019 to 2027 | Did not qualify | | | | | | | | |
| Total | — | 0/6 | — | | | | | | |

=== CONCACAF Nations League ===
CONCACAF Nations League record
| League phase | | | | | | | | | | | Final phase | | | | | | | | | |
| Season | League | Group | Pos. | Pld | W | D | L | GF | GA | P/R | Finals | Round | Pos. | Pld | W | D | L | GF | GA | Squad |
|---|---|---|---|---|---|---|---|---|---|---|---|---|---|---|---|---|---|---|---|---|
| 2019−20 | C | B | 5th | 4 | 3 | 1 | 0 | 10 | 2 | ▲ | (United States) 2021 | Ineligible | | | | | | | | |
| 2022–23 | B | C | 12th | 6 | 1 | 1 | 4 | 2 | 11 | Same position | (United States) 2023 | Ineligible | | | | | | | | |
| 2023–24 | B | D | 15th | 5 | 0 | 1 | 4 | 7 | 21 | ▼ | (United States) 2024 | Ineligible | | | | | | | | |
| 2024–25 | C | A | 5th | 4 | 1 | 1 | 2 | 10 | 13 | Same position | (United States) 2025 | Ineligible | | | | | | | | |
| 2026–27 | C | C | 9th | 4 | 0 | 0 | 4 | 3 | 20 | Same position | 2027 (Note: Since the 2026–27 CONCACAF Nations League, a final phase has been held for each league.) | Did not qualify | | | | | | | | |
| Total | | | | 23 | 5 | 4 | 14 | 32 | 67 | — | Total | — | | | | | | | | |

CONCACAF Nations League history
| First match | Bahamas 2–1 Bonaire (9 September 2019; Nassau, Bahamas) |
| Biggest Win | Bahamas 4–0 British Virgin Islands (10 October 2019; Basseterre, Saint Kitts and Nevis) |
| Biggest Defeat | Bahamas 0–8 Saint Martin (23 September 2026; Upper Bethlehem, U.S. Virgin Islands) |
| Best Result | League B (2022–23); League C (2019–20) |
| Worst Result | League B (2023–24); League C (2026–27) |

=== Caribbean Cup ===
| CFU Championship / Caribbean Cup record | | | | | | | | | Qualification record | | | | | |
| Year | Round | Pos. | Pld | W | D | L | GF | GA | Pld | W | D | L | GF | GA |
| 1978 to 1998 | Did not participate | | | | | | | | Did not participate | | | | | |
| (Trinidad and Tobago) 1999 | Did not qualify | | | | | | | | 5 | 1 | 1 | 3 | 4 | 17 |
| 2001 and 2005 | Did not participate | | | | | | | | Did not participate | | | | | |
| (Trinidad and Tobago) 2007 | Did not qualify | | | | | | | | 6 | 2 | 0 | 4 | 9 | 18 |
| 2008 to 2017 | Did not participate | | | | | | | | Did not participate | | | | | |
| Total | — | 0/2 | — | | | | | | 11 | 3 | 1 | 7 | 13 | 35 |

=== Pan American Games ===
Pan American Games record
| Year | Round | Pos. | Pld | W | D | L | GF | GA |
|---|---|---|---|---|---|---|---|---|
| 1951 to 1967 | Part of United Kingdom | | | | | | | |
| (Colombia) 1971 | Preliminary round | — | 3 | 1 | 0 | 2 | 4 | 13 |
| 1975 to 1979 | Did not participate | | | | | | | |
| (Venezuela) 1983 | Did not qualify | | | | | | | |
| 1987 to 1995 | Did not participate | | | | | | | |
| Since 1999 | The youth teams participated | | | | | | | |
| Total | Preliminary round | 1/2 | 3 | 1 | 0 | 2 | 4 | 13 |

=== Central American and Caribbean Games ===
Central American and Caribbean Games record
| Year | Round | Pos. | Pld | W | D | L | GF | GA |
|---|---|---|---|---|---|---|---|---|
| 1930 to 1966 | Part of United Kingdom | | | | | | | |
| (Panama) 1970 | Group stage | 8th | 3 | 0 | 1 | 2 | 3 | 18 |
| 1974 and 1978 | Did not participate | | | | | | | |
| (Cuba) 1982 | Group stage | 8th | 3 | 0 | 0 | 3 | 1 | 8 |
| (Dominican Republic) 1986 | Quarter-finals | 7th | 2 | 0 | 0 | 2 | 1 | 7 |
| Since 1990 | The youth teams participated | | | | | | | |
| Total | Quarter-finals | 3/3 | 8 | 0 | 1 | 7 | 5 | 33 |

== Head-to-head record ==
As of 4 October 2026 after match against U.S. Virgin Islands

Positive Record Neutral Record Negative Record

| Opponent | Pld | W | D | L | GF | GA | GD |
|---|---|---|---|---|---|---|---|
| Anguilla | 5 | 2 | 1 | 2 | 8 | 8 | 0 |
| Antigua and Barbuda | 3 | 0 | 1 | 2 | 3 | 12 | −9 |
| Barbados | 3 | 0 | 0 | 3 | 5 | 11 | −6 |
| Belize | 1 | 0 | 0 | 1 | 0 | 4 | −4 |
| Bermuda | 6 | 0 | 0 | 6 | 0 | 24 | −24 |
| Bonaire | 2 | 1 | 1 | 0 | 3 | 2 | +1 |
| British Virgin Islands | 5 | 2 | 2 | 1 | 10 | 9 | +1 |
| Cayman Islands | 4 | 1 | 0 | 3 | 4 | 10 | −6 |
| Costa Rica | 1 | 0 | 0 | 1 | 0 | 8 | −8 |
| Cuba | 4 | 0 | 0 | 4 | 0 | 18 | −18 |
| Curaçao (Note: Includes matches against the Netherlands Antilles.) | 1 | 0 | 0 | 1 | 1 | 8 | −7 |
| Dominica | 3 | 0 | 1 | 2 | 2 | 8 | −6 |
| Dominican Republic | 2 | 1 | 0 | 1 | 4 | 4 | 0 |
| Grenada | 1 | 0 | 0 | 1 | 0 | 6 | –6 |
| Guadeloupe | 1 | 0 | 0 | 1 | 0 | 2 | −2 |
| Guyana | 5 | 0 | 0 | 5 | 3 | 17 | −14 |
| Haiti | 5 | 0 | 0 | 5 | 0 | 29 | −29 |
| Jamaica | 2 | 0 | 0 | 2 | 0 | 13 | −13 |
| Mexico | 2 | 0 | 0 | 2 | 0 | 16 | −16 |
| Nicaragua | 2 | 0 | 0 | 2 | 0 | 6 | −6 |
| Panama | 1 | 1 | 0 | 0 | 1 | 0 | +1 |
| Puerto Rico | 5 | 0 | 0 | 5 | 3 | 26 | −23 |
| Saint Kitts and Nevis | 3 | 0 | 0 | 3 | 0 | 9 | −9 |
| Saint Martin | 1 | 0 | 0 | 1 | 0 | 8 | −8 |
| Saint Vincent and the Grenadines | 3 | 1 | 1 | 1 | 4 | 4 | 0 |
| Trinidad and Tobago | 5 | 0 | 2 | 3 | 1 | 11 | –10 |
| Turks and Caicos Islands | 7 | 6 | 0 | 1 | 27 | 7 | +20 |
| U.S. Virgin Islands | 5 | 1 | 2 | 2 | 6 | 10 | –4 |
| Total | 88 | 16 | 11 | 61 | 86 | 252 | −166 |
