= Dion Godet =

Personal information
- Date of birth: 8 November 1965 (age 61)
- Place of birth: Bahamas

Managerial career
- Years: Team
- 2014-2018: Bahamas

Dion Godet (born 8 November 1965 in the Bahamas) is a Bahamanian football coach who coached the Bahamas national team. He debuted in 2 matches against Bermuda.
