= Bahamas President's Cup =

The Bahamas President's Cup is the top knockout tournament of the Bahamas football. The cup was created in 1999.

== Finals ==
Winners were:

- 1999: Cavalier (1)
- 2000: Cavalier (2) 2–2 (3–1 p.) Bears
- 2001: Khaki Superstars (1) 3–0 Cavalier
- 2009 Bears (1) 3–0 Cavalier
- 2010 Bears (2) 4–0 Khaki Superstars
- 2011 Cavalier (3) 2–1 Bears
