= New Providence FA Cup =

The New Providence FA Cup is the top knockout tournament of the New Providence, Bahamas football.

== Winners ==
Winners were:

- 1982–83 : Cavalier
- 1983–84 : Not known
- 1984–85 : Nick's United
- 1985–86 : Nick's United
- 1986–99 : Not known
- 1999–2000 : Cavalier
- 2000–01 : Cavalier
- 2001–02 : Johnson United
- 2002–03 : Bears
- 2003–04 : Bears
- 2004–05 : Not known
- 2005–06 : Bears
- 2006–07 : Bears
- 2007–08 : Nassau
- 2008–09 : Bears
- 2009–10 : Johnson United
- 2010–11 : Cavalier
- 2011–12 : Bears
- 2012–14 : Not known
- 2014–15 : Western Warriors
- 2015–16 : Western Warriors
- 2017–18 : Not known
- 2017–18 : Western Warriors
- 2018–22 : Not known
- 2022–23 : Western Warriors
