= Bahamas Football Association =

Governing body of association football in the Bahamas

CONCACAF
- Founded: 1967; 59 years ago
- Headquarters: Nassau
- FIFA affiliation: 1968
- CONCACAF affiliation: 1981
- President: Anton Sealey
- Website: bahamasfa.net

The Bahamas Football Association (BFA), is the official governing body of the sport of association football in The Bahamas. Founded in 1967 and headquartered in Nassau, the federation is a full member of FIFA since 1968 and governs Bahamian football at the international, professional, and amateur levels, including: the men's and women's national teams, BFA Senior League, youth organizations, and the beach soccer national teams. BFA sanctions the national cup Bahamas President's Cup, Grand Bahama FA Cup, and New Providence FA Cup tournaments. The BFA is also a member of the Caribbean Football Union and CONCACAF.

== History ==
Football was introduced to The Bahamas by veterans returning to the island after World War I. Clubs from the island of New Providence arranged matches between themselves as well as playing against teams from visiting Naval ships and other vessels, which stopped in Nassau. In 1954 The Bahamas Amateur Football Association was organized with Brian Andrews, selected as the first President. Under the auspices of the BAFA, two leagues, the New Providence Sunday League and the New Providence Saturday League, developed. In 1967, the need for appropriate international membership became necessary as international matches became more frequent and the two leagues merged, forming the Bahamas Football Association. The BFA became a member of FIFA in 1968 and joined CONCACAF in 1981.

=== Caribbean Football Union corruption whistle blowers ===
In May 2011 the vice president of the Bahamas Football Association, Fred Lunn (now serving as BFA General Secretary), attended a meeting in Port-of-Spain, Trinidad and Tobago in the stead of Anton Sealey, the President of the Bahamas Football Association who was attending an event in the run-up to the 61st FIFA Congress in Zürich, Switzerland. The meeting had been arranged so that the president of the Asian Football Confederation, Mohammed Bin Hammam, could address representatives of the CFU, in an attempt to persuade them to vote for him in the upcoming FIFA presidential elections. During the meeting Lunn was given brown envelope with the word "Bahamas" written on it containing US$40,000. Believing it to be a bribe in a cash-for-votes scandal, funded by bin Hammam, Lunn reported the incident to Sealey, who in turn reported it to CONCACAF General Secretary Chuck Blazer. Lunn took a photograph of the money and the envelope before returning them. He later gave journalists a digital copy of the photograph for publication.

Bahamas-based newspaper The Tribune praised Sealey and Lunn for not accepting the envelope: "The attempted bribe was an insult to the whole Caribbean. Those seeking the Caribbean Football Federation's vote obviously saw its members as coming from poor island nations who would never have seen so much money as fell from the brown envelope that was offered them. Many proved to their tempters that poor they might be, but they had pride, they had integrity and although they might never see so much money again, under such tainted conditions they would never stoop so low as to pick it up. As was pointed out, $40,000 for the Caribbean's smaller islands would be the equivalent of several years' salary."

== Association staff ==
Name	Position	Source
(The Bahamas) Anya James	President	
(The Bahamas) Dion Peterson	Vice President	
(The Bahamas) Fred Lunn	General Secretary	
(Grenada) Bruce Swan	Technical Director	
(The Bahamas) Soraya Toppin-Herbert	Director of Women's Football	
(The Bahamas) Neasley Jean	Team Coach (Men's)	
(The Bahamas) Ricqua Bain	Team Coach (Women's)	
(Grenada) Dianne Ferreira-James	Head/Director of the Referees Department	
(Grenada) Dianne Ferreira-James	Referee Coordinator	

== National teams ==
=== Bahamas Men's Team ===
Formed when the BFA joined FIFA in 1968, the Bahamas national team, nicknamed the bahamian Slayersz or Baha Boyz) has never qualified for the FIFA World Cup as of the 2018 World Cup including when they voluntarily withdrew from the 2014 FIFA World Cup qualifiers after playing in the first round.

==== Coaches ====
- Randy Rogers (The Bahamas) (1987)
- Peter Wilson (England) (1998–2000)
- Gary White (England) (2000–2006)
- Neider dos Santos (Brazil) (2006–2010)
- Paul James (2011)
- Nesley Jean (The Bahamas) (2014)
- Dion Godet (The Bahamas) (2014–2018)
- Nesley Jean (The Bahamas) (2019–2022)
- Bruce Carrell (The Bahamas) (2022-present)

=== Bahamas Women's Team ===
The Bahamas women's national football team is the national women's football team of the Bahamas. It has never qualified for a World Cup.

=== Bahamas beach soccer team ===
The Bahamas national beach soccer team represents The Bahamas in international beach soccer competitions. Excluding their participation as the host nation for the 2017 FIFA Beach Soccer World Cup, they have never qualified for a World Cup.

== See also ==
- BFA Senior League
