= BFA Senior League =

Association football league in Bahamas

- Founded: 1990
- First season: 1991–92
- Country: (The Bahamas) Bahamas
- Confederation: CONCACAF
- Number of clubs: 12
- Level on pyramid: 1
- Domestic cup(s): Bahamas President's Cup; Grand Bahama FA Cup; New Providence FA Cup
- International cup(s): CFU Club Championship; CONCACAF Champions League
- Current champions: University of the Bahamas (2nd title) (2024–25)
- Most championships: Bears FC (7 titles)
- Top scorer: Lesly St. Fleur (107 goals)
- Broadcaster(s): Cable Bahamas
- Website: www.bahamasfa.com
- Current: 2025–26 BFA Senior League

The BFA Senior League is the highest championship of football in Bahamas. Before 2008 it was played between the winners of the New Providence Football League and the Grand Bahama Football League. In 2008 the two leagues from the two islands merged into one league. League games usually take place in front of dozens of spectators.

== Current clubs (2024–25 season) ==
- Baha Juniors
- Cavalier
- Dynamos
- Future Stars
- IM Bears
- Inter Nassau
- Inter Nassau U-17
- UB Mingoes
- United
- Western Warriors
- Western Warriors Gladiators
- Westside-Renegades

== List of champions ==
=== New Providence / Grand Bahama Football League (1991–2007) ===
| Ed. | Season | Champion |
|---|---|---|
| 1 | 1991–92 | JS Johnson United |
| 2 | 1992–93 | JS Johnson United |
| 3 | 1993–94 | Britam United |
| 4 | 1994–95 | Britam United |
| 5 | 1995–96 | Freeport |
| 6 | 1996–97 | Cavalier |
| 7 | 1997–98 | Cavalier |
| 8 | 1998–99 | Cavalier |
| 9 | 1999–00 | Abacom United |
| 10 | 2000–01 | Cavalier |
| – | 2001–02 | final not played |
| 11 | 2002–03 | Bears |
| – | 2003–04 | final not played |
| – | 2005 | final not played |
| – | 2005–06 | final not played |
| – | 2007 | final not played |
| – | 2008 | final not played |

=== BFA Senior League (2008–present) ===
| Ed. | Season | Champion |
|---|---|---|
| 1 | 2008–09 | Bears |
| 2 | 2009–10 | IM Bears |
| 3 | 2011 | IM Bears |
| 4 | 2011–12 | IM Bears |
| 5 | 2013 | IM Bears |
| 6 | 2013–14 | Lyford Cay |
| 7 | 2014–15 | Western Warriors |
| 8 | 2015–16 | IM Bears |
| 9 | 2016–17 | Western Warriors |
| 10 | 2017–18 | University of the Bahamas |
| 11 | 2018–19 | Dynamos |
| 12 | 2020 | Season abandoned due to COVID-19 pandemic |
| – | 2021 | No Tournament |
| 13 | 2022–23 | Western Warriors |
| 14 | 2023–24 | Western Warriors |
| 15 | 2024–25 | Western Warriors |
| 16 | 2025–26 | University of the Bahamas |

== Performance by club ==
| Club | Titles | Seasons won |
|---|---|---|
| Bears | 7 | 2002–03, 2008–09, 2009–10, 2011, 2011–12, 2013, 2015–16 |
| Western Warriors | 5 | 2014–15, 2016–17, 2022–23, 2023–24, 2024–25 |
| United | 4 | 1991–92, 1992–93, 1993–94, 1994–95 |
| Cavalier | 4 | 1996–97, 1997–98, 1998–99, 2000–01 |
| University of the Bahamas | 2 | 2017–18, 2025–26 |
| Abacom United | 1 | 1999–00 |
| Freeport | 1 | 1995–96 |
| Renegades | 1 | 2013–14 |
| Dynamos | 1 | 2018–19 |

== Individual statistics ==
=== Top goalscorers ===
| Season | Goalscorer | Club | Goals |
|---|---|---|---|
| 2008–09 | (The Bahamas) Lesly St. Fleur | Bears | 14 |
| 2010–11 | (The Bahamas) Lesly St. Fleur | Bears | 16 |
| 2022–23 | (Jamaica) Ronaldo Green | University of the Bahamas | |
| 2023–24 | (The Bahamas) Lesly St. Fleur | Bears | 35 |
| 2024-25 | (The Bahamas) Brandon Adderley | Dynamos Nassau | 29 |

Most goals by a player in a single game

- 7 goals
  - Lesly St. Fleur (Bears) 0–10 against Inter U-17 (14 February 2024).

=== Multiple hat-tricks ===
| Rank | Country | Player | Hat-tricks |
|---|---|---|---|
| 1 | (The Bahamas) | Lesly St. Fleur | 6 |
| 1 | (Jamaica) | Ronaldo Green | 6 |
| 1 | (The Bahamas) | Johnny Tinus | 6 |
| 4 | (The Bahamas) | Brandon Adderley | 5 |
| 5 | (The Bahamas) | Andre Carey | 1 |
| 5 | (The Bahamas) | Geravis | 1 |
| 5 | (The Bahamas) | K Lyons | 1 |
| 5 | (The Bahamas) | Ordaine McCallum | 1 |
| 5 | (The Bahamas) | Mertelus | 1 |
| 5 | (The Bahamas) | Saneus | 1 |
| 5 | | E Thelusma | 1 |
| 5 | (The Bahamas) | Markus Trail | 1 |

== Women's League ==
=== Top goalscorers ===
| Season | Player | Team | Goals |
|---|---|---|---|
| 2024-25 | (The Bahamas) Valtinique Simmons | United Purple | 23 |

== See also ==
- Bahamas Football Association
