= New Providence Football League =

Province football league

The New Providence Football League was the highest form of football on the island of New Providence.

Before 2008, the champion of the New Providence Football League would compete with the champion of the Grand Bahama Football League to determine the national title. In 2008, the two leagues merged to form the BFA Senior League.

== New Providence Football League Champions ==
- 1991–92 : Britam United
- 1992–93 : Britam United
- 1993–94 : Britam United
- 1994–95 : Britam United
- 1995–96 : JS Johnson United
- 1996–97 – Cavalier FC
- 1997–98 – Cavalier FC
- 1998–99 – Cavalier FC
- 1999–2000 – Cavalier FC
- 2000–01 – Cavalier FC
- 2001–02 – Bears FC
- 2002–03 – Bears FC
- 2003–04 – Bears FC
- 2005 – Caledonia Celtic
- 2005–06 – Caledonia Celtic
- 2007 – Bears FC
- 2008 – Bears FC

== See also ==
- Grand Bahama Football League
- BFA Senior League
