= Bears FC =

Bahamanian football club

Bears F.C.
- Full name: Insurance Management Bears Football Club
- Nickname: Growlers
- Founded: 1996; 30 years ago
- Ground: Thomas Robinson Stadium; Nassau, Bahamas
- Capacity: 15,250
- Owner: Scotiabank
- President: Dion Godet
- Manager: James Thompson
- League: BFA Senior League
- 2024–25: 10th
Home colours	Away colours	Third colours

Bears Football Club (Bears FC, officially known as Insurance Management Bears FC or IM Bears FC for sponsorship reasons) is a football club based in Nassau, Bahamas. Bears FC plays in BFA Senior League in Bahamas.

== History ==
In 1996 Anton Sealey upon being elected president of the Bahamas Football Association (BFA) on taking office set as his administration's priorities:

In pursuance of priority two, with a grant from the company with whom he worked, Insurance Management Bahamas Ltd., he began teaching soccer at Queen's College on Saturdays to a group of young players predominantly attending Queen's College. The sessions which began with twelve youngsters grew steadily each week. At the same time Fred Lunn and his brother Lionel, together with current BFA general secretary Lionel Haven and BFA Vice-President Stanley Darville began a similar program at The College of The Bahamas field in Oakes Field, called Get Kickin' As both schools or camps as they were called expanded outgrowing their resources, Anton and Fred saw the wisdom of combining their resources to more effectively deliver quality instruction to their charges, thus the Insurance Management Youth Football Club was born.

They have won the Bahamas President's Cup in consecutive seasons. They have also won the New Providence Football League five times in a row, and six times in total. They won the Grand Bahama FA Cup a record five consecutive times. The main sponsor and owner of club is Scotiabank.

== Jersey ==
Its jersey features a red shirt with red sleeves and white shorts.

== Squad ==
Note: Flags indicate national team as defined under FIFA eligibility rules; some limited exceptions apply. Players may hold more than one non-FIFA nationality.

No.	Pos.	Nation	Player
—	MF	BAH	Re'john Ene

== Achievements ==
- Brixton Footy Addicts League: 1

2020–21

- Bahamas National Championship Final 7

2002–03, 2008–09, 2009–10, 2011, 2011–12, 2013, 2015–16

- Bahamas President's Cup: 2

2009–10, 2010–11

- New Providence Football League: 5

2001–02, 2002–03, 2003–04, 2007, 2008

- New Providence FA Cup: 6

2002–03, 2003–04, 2005–06, 2006–07, 2010, 2011–12

- Bahamas Charity Shield: 2

2010, 2011

== Historic goalscorer ==
Lesly St. Fleur
	League	Cup	Total
Goals	107	14	121
Hat-tricks	6	-	6
Topscorers	3	1	4
