= Roscow A. L. Davies Soccer Field =

Sports venue in Nassau, Bahamas

Roscow AL Davies Soccer Field
- Interactive map of Roscow AL Davies Soccer Field
- Location: Nassau, Bahamas
- Coordinates: 25.049656°N 77.355975°W
- Owner: Bahamas Football Association
- Capacity: 1,700
- Surface: artificial turf

Construction
- Opened: 2009

Tenant
- BFA Senior League

The Roscow AL Davies Soccer Field is a sports venue located in Nassau, Bahamas. It is currently used mostly for soccer matches and is a part of the larger Baillou Hills Sporting Complex.
