= Grand Bahama FA Cup =

Bahamian football tournament

The Grand Bahama FA Cup is the top knockout tournament of the Grand Bahama, Bahamas football.

== Winners ==
Winners were:

- 1995–96: Pub on the Mall Red Dogs
- 1996–99:not known
- 1999–2000:not known
- 2000–01: Acacom United
- 2001–02: not known
- 2002–03: Playtime Tigers
- 2003–04: Freeport FC Bahamas
