= Grand Bahama Football League =

The Grand Bahama Football League was the highest form of association football on the Bahamian island of Grand Bahama. Before 2008, the champion of the Grand Bahama Football League would compete with the champion of the New Providence Football League to determine the national title. In 2008, the two leagues merged to form the BFA Senior League.

== Grand Bahama Football League Champions ==
- 1996 – Pub on the Mall Red Dogs
- 2000 – Abacom United FC
- 2001 – Abacom United FC
- 2002 – Abacom United FC
- 2003 – Abacom United FC
- 2004 – Quality Superstars
- 2005 – unknown
- 2006 – Brita Red Bulls
- 2007 – apparently not played
- 2008 – apparently not played
- 2017 – Dwayne Whylly FC

== See also ==
- New Providence Football League
- BFA Senior League
