= Thomas Robinson Stadium =

Football stadium in Nassau, Bahamas

Coordinates: 25°3′15.77″N 77°21′36.78″W

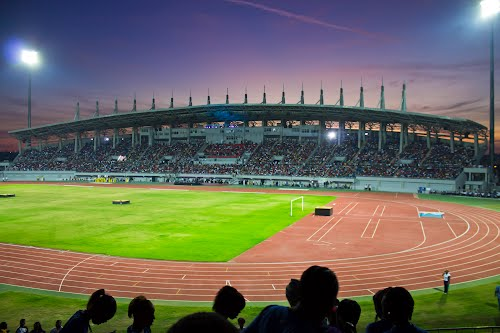
- The stadium in 2012
- Interactive map of Thomas Robinson Stadium
- Full name: Thomas A. Robinson National Stadium
- Location: Queen Elizabeth Sports Centre, Nassau, Bahamas
- Owner: Bahamas Ministry of Youth, Sports, and Culture
- Capacity: 15,023 (expandable to 23,000)
- Surface: Grass

Construction
- Built: 1981
- Opened: 1981
- Renovated: 2005 for the CAC Championship; 2014 for the IAAF World Relays
- Expanded: February 23, 2012

Tenants
- Bahamas national football team College of the Bahamas; Bahamas Bowl (2014–present)

Thomas Robinson Stadium, officially Thomas A. Robinson National Stadium, is a multi-purpose stadium in Nassau, Bahamas. The largest stadium in the country, it is used primarily for soccer matches. The stadium is also the home of the Bahamas Bowl, an annual NCAA Division I college football (American football) bowl game.

The stadium has a capacity of 15,000 people, and can be expanded to hold 23,000 people. It is named after Thomas A. Robinson, a sprinter who represented the Bahamas internationally at the Empire and Commonwealth Games and four summer Olympic Games.

== Bahamas national football team ==
On 22 August 2011, the Bahamas national football team was withdrawn by FIFA from the 2014 FIFA World Cup qualifiers. Some days later, Bahamas Football Association current president Anton Sealey said the reason was the incomplete construction of the Thomas Robinson Stadium project in Nassau.

== Bahamas Bowl (NCAA) ==
The Bahamas Bowl is a National Collegiate Athletic Association (NCAA) sanctioned bowl game in American college football at the Football Bowl Subdivision (FBS) level, first played in December 2014 at Thomas Robinson Stadium. Through the January 2025 playing, each game has involved a team from Conference USA (C-USA), with all but one of their opponents coming from the Mid-American Conference (MAC). Due to renovations at the stadium, the December 2023 edition of the bowl was played at an alternate site, Jerry Richardson Stadium in Charlotte, North Carolina, and was named for a local sponsor (Famous Toastery) of that contest.

== IAAF World Relays ==
In 2014, Thomas Robinson Stadium served as the host of the inaugural IAAF World Relays, a relay athletics meet organized by the IAAF. A new Mondo track was installed for the competition. The Stadium also hosted the 2015 and 2017 IAAF World Relays, and had hosted the 2024 World Athletics Relays.
