= UB Mingoes men's soccer =

Bahamanian football club

- Full name: UB Mingoes
- Nickname: Mingoes
- Founded: February 28, 2017; 9 years ago
- League: BFA Senior League
- 2025–26: Champions
| Home colors | Away colors |

The UB Mingoes men's soccer programme represents the University of the Bahamas in all soccer competitions. The program won the 2017–18 BFA Senior League. The team is based in Nassau, Bahamas.

== History ==
The UB Mingoes men's soccer program began as the College of the Bahamas Caribs, before being rebranded in 2017.

== Colors and badge ==
On February 28, 2017, the Government of the Bahamas announced the Mingoes as the university's name and revealed the mascot. The main colours are blue, black, and white.

== Stadium ==
The program plays on the soccer fields adjacent to Thomas Robinson Stadium.

== Honours ==
UB Mingoes honours
| Honour | No. | Years |
|---|---|---|
| BFA Senior League | 2 | 2017–18, 2025-26 |

== See also ==
- UB Mingoes
