= Dynamos FC (The Bahamas) =

Bahamanian football club

- Full name: Dynamos Football Club
- Short name: Dynamos
- Founded: 1957
- Ground: Davies Field; Nassau
- Capacity: 1,700
- Chairman: Alphonsus Cavendish
- Manager: Dayve Paul
- League: BFA Senior League
- 2025–26: 3rd
- Website: http://www.bahamasfa.com/clubs/club/2/dynamos_fc.html
Home colours	Away colours

Dynamos FC is a Bahamian football club based in Nassau. The club competes in the BFA Senior League, the top tier of Bahamian football.

The club was founded in 1957, and play their home matches in the 1,700-capacity, Roscow A. L. Davies Soccer Field.

== Squad ==
As of 26 July 2018

Note: Flags indicate national team as defined under FIFA eligibility rules; some limited exceptions apply. Players may hold more than one non-FIFA nationality.

No.	Pos.	Nation	Player
—	GK	BAH	Dwayne Whylly
—		BAH	Michael Wong
—		BAH	Henry Stewart
—		BAH	Shari Clarke
—		BAH	Bennet Decady
—		BAH	Bryan Kemp
—		BAH	Torcassio Bethel
—		BAH	Jahlil Johnson
—		BAH	Daniel Mullings
—		BAH	Dhurai Ferguson
—		BAH	Tajaro Hudson
—		BAH	Dwayne Taylor

No.	Pos.	Nation	Player
—		BAH	Shamia Pintard
—		BAH	Demetrius Greene
—		BAH	Andrew Simmons
—		BAH	Keegan Bischof
—		BAH	D'Shan Clarke
—		BAH	Dominick Smith
—		BAH	Ianna Cartwright
—		BAH	Teniko Thompson
—	DF	BAH	Jonathan Miller
—		BAH	Dejann Brennen
—		BAH	Willdaja Perez
—		BAH	Markyle Greene
