= United F.C. (The Bahamas) =

Bahamanian football club

- Full name: United Football Club
- Short name: United
- Founded: 1 August 1974 (51 years ago)
- Ground: Davies Field; Nassau
- Capacity: 1,700
- Chairman: Samuel Thibaud
- Manager: Ricardo Bowe
- League: BFA Senior League
- 2023–24: 7th
- Website: http://unitedfootballclub.teamsnapsites.com/

United F.C. is a Bahamian football club based in Nassau. The club competes in the BFA Senior League, the top tier of Bahamian football.

The club was founded in 1974, and play their home matches in the 1,700-capacity, Roscow A. L. Davies Soccer Field.

== Club ==
=== Squad ===
As of 23 June 2017

=== Management ===
Position	Staff
President	Samuel Thibaud
Vice President	Sariaha Miller-Frazer
General Secretary	Joanna Davis
Chief Financial Officer	Roberta Wheeler-Deveaux
Executive Director	Patrica Rolle-Hamilton
Registrar	Rashimah Thibaud
Director of Football	Jason Minnis
Director of Community Services	Renalda Siffrin
Director of Education	Bianca Morris-Christie
Master Team Manager	Ricardo Bowe
Senior Team Manager	David Arnold
Grassroots Programme Coordinator	Bethsheba Williams-Clarke

Last updated: 23 June 2017
Source: United FC Facebook Page

== Honors ==
- BFA Knock-Out Championship

Champions: (1) 1986
