= Western Warriors SC =

Bahamanian football club

Western Warriors Soccer Club is a football club based in Nassau, Bahamas. They play in the BFA Senior League.

== Achievements ==
- BFA Senior League
  - Champions (5): 2014–15, 2016–17, 2022–23, 2023–24, 2024–25
- New Providence FA Cup
  - Winners (4): 2014–15, 2015–16, 2017–18, 2022–23
