= Renegades FC =

Bahamanian football club

- Full name: Renegades Football Club
- Nickname: Ospreys
- Founded: 1989; 37 years ago
- Ground: Roscow A. L. Davies Soccer Field; Nassau, Bahamas
- Capacity: 1,700
- Chairman: Gavin Watchorn
- Manager: Fred Bournas
- League: BFA Senior League
- 2025–26: 2nd
Home colours

Renegades Football Club (formerly known as Lyford Cay Football Club) is a Bahamian football club based in Lyford Cay while playing its home game in the capital Nassau. The team plays in the BFA Senior League. The team is also known by its nickname of the Ospreys (the Dragons until 2015), to distinguish it from a second Lyford Cay FC that has simultaneously played in the BFA Senior League (as recently as 2013–14) nicknamed the "Warriors". The Warriors serve as the reserve team for the Ospreys.

The club was founded in 1989 and has grown significantly over the past twenty-five years moving from a school-based football program to an established football club and registered member of the Bahamas Football Association (BFA).

Lyford Cay FC won its first national championship in 2013–14. Building on this title, the team became the first Bahamian team to compete in the CFU Club Championship in 2015.

In September 2017 Lyford Cay FC changed it name with the permission of the Bahamas Football Association to Renegades FC.

== Achievements ==
- BFA Senior League:

Champion (1): 2014
Runner-up (5): 2010, 2011, 2013, 2019, 2026

- Bahamas FA Cup:

Runner-up (1): 2010

== Performance in International Competitions ==
- 2015 CFU Club Championship

Played in Haiti

First Round v. (Haiti) Don Bosco 0–10
First Round v. (United States Virgin Islands) Helenites 1–0
First Round v. (Guadeloupe) USR Sainte-Rose 2–2

== Colors and Badges ==
Logo used until 2015, when the team's nicknamed changed from "Dragons" to "Osprey".
