= Cavalier FC =

Bahamanian football club

- Full name: Cavalier Football Club
- Ground: Thomas Robinson Stadium; Nassau, Bahamas
- Capacity: 15,023
- Chairman: John Wreschnieder
- Manager: Micheal Corleone
- League: BFA Senior League
- 2025–26: 8th

Cavalier FC is a Bahamian football club based in the capital Nassau. It plays in the BFA Senior League.

== Achievements ==
- Bahamas National Championship Final winner: 4

1996–97, 1997–98, 1998–99, 2000–01

- Bahamas FA Cup: 3

1982–83, 1999–00, 2000–01

- Bahamas President's Cup: 2

1999, 2000

- New Providence Football League: 5

1996–97, 1997–98, 1998–99, 1999–2000, 2000–01

- New Providence FA Cup: 4

1982–83, 1999–2000, 2000–01, 2010–11
