= 2022 AFA Senior Male League =

AFA Senior Male League
- Season: 2022
- Dates: 4 March – 19 June (regular season); 8 July – 24 July (playoffs); 12 August – 11 September (champions league)
- Champions: Regular season: Doc's United; Playoffs: Roaring Lions
- Caribbean Shield: Roaring Lions
- AFA Champions League: Roaring Lions; Attackers; Doc's United; Lymers; Kicks United
- Matches played: 55
- Goals scored: 312 (5.67 per match)
- Biggest home win: 22 goals: Diamond 22–0 Eagle Claw (11 June)
- Biggest away win: 20 goals: Eagle Claw 1–21 Salsa Ballers (26 May)
- Highest scoring: 22 goals: Eagle Claw 1–21 Salsa Ballers (26 May); Diamond 22–0 Eagle Claw (11 June)

The 2022 AFA Senior Male League was the 23rd season of the AFA Senior Male League, the men's football league in Anguilla. The regular season began on March 4 and concluded on June 19. The playoffs began on July 8 and concluded on July 24.

Roaring Lions won their 10th Anguillan league championship, and their third consecutive league title, beating Attackers in a penalty shoot-out.

As winners of the AFA Senior Male League, Roaring Lions were eligible to participate in the 2023 CONCACAF Caribbean Shield but elected not to participate.

== Teams ==
=== Stadiums and locations ===
Note: Table lists in alphabetical order.

Team	Location	Stadium	Capacity
ALHCS Spartan	The Valley	JRW Park	200
Attackers	Stoney Ground	Little Dix Field	100
Diamond	The Valley	JRW Park	200
Doc's United	The Valley	JRW Park	200
Eagle Claw	The Valley	Ronald Webster Park	4,000
Kicks United	The Valley	Ronald Webster Park	4,000
Lymers FC	The Valley	Guishard Centre	1,100
Salsa Ballers	George Hill	Anguilla Community College	100
Roaring Lions	The Valley	Ronald Webster Park	4,000
Uprising	The Valley	Guishard Centre	1,100
West End Predators	West End	Immanuel Methodist Church	100

=== Arriving clubs ===
- Eagle Claw

=== Departing clubs ===
- Enforcers

== Regular season ==
=== Table ===
Pos	Team	Pld	W	D	L	GF	GA	GD	Pts	Qualification
1	Doc's United	10	8	1	1	53	4	+49	25	Qualification for AFA Champions League, and Playoffs
2	Lymers	10	8	1	1	24	7	+17	25	Qualification for AFA Champions League, and Playoffs
3	Roaring Lions (C)	10	7	1	2	27	9	+18	22	Qualification for 2023 CONCACAF Caribbean Shield, AFA Champions League, and Playoffs
4	Attackers	10	6	2	2	42	11	+31	20	Qualification for AFA Champions League, and Playoffs
5	Salsa Ballers	10	6	1	3	54	18	+36	19	Qualification for Playoffs
6	Kicks United	10	5	1	4	21	16	+5	16	Qualification for AFA Champions League, and Playoffs
7	Uprising	10	4	1	5	24	17	+7	13	Qualification for the AFA Development League
8	Diamond	10	3	2	5	36	20	+16	11	Qualification for the AFA Development League
9	ALHCS Spartan	10	1	0	9	10	44	−34	3	Qualification for the AFA Development League
10	West End Predators	10	1	0	9	10	64	−54	3	Qualification for the AFA Development League
11	Eagle Claw	10	1	0	9	10	101	−91	3	Qualification for the AFA Development League

Source: RSSSF
Rules for classification: 1) points; 2) total wins; 3) total goal differential; 4) total goals scored; 5) fewer disciplinary points; 6) away goal differential; 7) away goals scored; 8) home goals differential; 9) home goals scored; 10) coin toss (2 clubs tied) or drawing of lots (≥3 clubs tied)
(C) Champions

== Playoffs ==
=== Bracket ===
Quarterfinals
3	Roaring Lions	1
6	Kicks United	0
4	Attackers (walkover)	3
5	~~Salsa Ballers~~	0

Semifinals
2	Lymers	1
3	Roaring Lions	3
1	Doc's United	1 (4)
4	Attackers (p)	1 (5)

Finals
3	Roaring Lions (p)	1 (5)
4	Attackers	1 (3)

== 2022 AFA Champions League ==
The 2022 AFA Champions League was held from August 12 to September 11. The top five finishers during the regular season competed in this league.

=== Table ===
Pos	Team	Pld	W	D	L	GF	GA	GD	Pts	Qualification
1	Doc's United (C)	4	3	0	1	14	6	+8	9	Champions
2	Attackers	4	3	0	1	14	7	+7	9	
3	Roaring Lions	4	3	0	1	8	2	+6	9	
4	Kicks United	4	0	1	3	1	10	−9	1	
5	Lymers	4	0	1	3	2	14	−12	1	

Source: RSSSF
Rules for classification: 1) points; 2) total wins; 3) total goal differential; 4) total goals scored; 5) fewer disciplinary points; 6) away goal differential; 7) away goals scored; 8) home goals differential; 9) home goals scored; 10) coin toss (2 clubs tied) or drawing of lots (≥3 clubs tied)
(C) Champions

== 2022 AFL Development League ==
The 2022 AFL Development League was held from July 15 to August 20. The bottom six finishers during the regular season competed in this league.

=== Table ===
Pos	Team	Pld	W	D	L	GF	GA	GD	Pts	Qualification
1	Diamond (C)	4	3	0	1	13	3	+10	9	Champions
2	ALHCS Spartan	4	3	0	1	12	4	+8	9	
3	Uprising	4	1	1	2	7	8	−1	4	
4	Eagle Claw	4	1	1	2	10	12	−2	4	
5	West End Predators	4	1	0	3	6	21	−15	3	
6	Salsa Ballers	0	0	0	0	0	0	0	0	Withdrew

Source: RSSSF
Rules for classification: 1) points; 2) total wins; 3) total goal differential; 4) total goals scored; 5) fewer disciplinary points; 6) away goal differential; 7) away goals scored; 8) home goals differential; 9) home goals scored; 10) coin toss (2 clubs tied) or drawing of lots (≥3 clubs tied)
(C) Champions
