= 2021 AFA Senior Male League =

AFA Senior Male League
- Season: 2021
- Dates: March 5 – TBD
- Top goalscorer: (Anguilla) Jonathan Guishard (10 goals)
- Biggest home win: WEP 1–12 DUFC (12 Mar. 2021)
- Biggest away win: WEP 1–12 DUFC (12 Mar. 2021)
- Highest scoring: 13 goals WEP 1–12 DUFC (12 Mar. 2021)
- Longest winning run: 8 games: Roaring Lions (12 Mar. – 25 Jul. 2021)
- Longest unbeaten run: 8 games: Roaring Lions (12 Mar. – 25 Jul. 2021)
- Longest winless run: 4 games: West End Predators (12 Mar. – 10 Apr. 2021)

The 2021 AFA Senior Male League is the 21st season of the AFA Senior Male League, the men's football league in Anguilla. The season began on March 12, 2021.

== Teams ==
=== Stadiums and locations ===
Note: Table lists in alphabetical order.

Team	Location	Stadium	Capacity
ALHCS Spartan	The Valley	JRW Park	200
Attackers	Stoney Ground	Little Dix Field	100
Diamond	The Valley	JRW Park	200
Doc's United	The Valley	JRW Park	200
Enforcers	The Valley	Guishard Centre	1,100
Kicks United	The Valley	Ronald Webster Park	4,000
Lymers FC	The Valley	Guishard Centre	1,100
Salsa Ballers	George Hill	Anguilla Community College	100
Roaring Lions	The Valley	Ronald Webster Park	4,000
Uprising	The Valley	Guishard Centre	1,100
West End Predators	West End	Immanuel Methodist Church	100

== Table ==
#	Team	Pld	W	D	L	GF	GA	DG	Pts
1.	Roaring Lions FC (C)	8	8	0	0	33	1	32	24
2.	Kicks United FC	9	7	0	2	27	8	19	21
3.	Uprising FC	8	5	1	2	16	12	8	16
4.	Doc's United FC	6	5	0	1	28	3	25	15
5.	Lymers FC	8	4	1	3	11	8	3	13
6.	Attackers FC	9	3	4	2	10	16	-6	13
7.	Diamond FC	8	3	1	4	11	11	0	10
8.	Enforcers FC	8	2	1	5	15	16	-1	7
9.	Salsa Ballers FC	9	2	0	7	11	32	-21	6
10.	ALHCS Spartans FC	9	1	2	6	6	24	-18	5
11.	West End Predators	10	1	0	9	8	45	-37	3
