= 2026 AFA Senior Male League =

Football league season

AFA Senior Male League
- Season: 2026
- Dates: 20 February – 17 July 2026
- Country: Anguilla
- Teams: 10
- Champions: Roaring Lions
- Runner up: Lymers
- Premiers: Attackers
- CFU Club Shield: Roaring Lions
- Matches: 94
- Goals: 421 (4.48 per match)
- Biggest home win: Uprising 10–0 Eagle Claw (10 March)
- Biggest away win: West End Predators 0–15 Roaring Lions (12 April)
- Highest scoring: West End Predators 0–15 Roaring Lions (12 April)
- All statistics correct as of 27 July 2026.

The 2026 AFA Senior Male League season was the 26th season of the AFA Senior Male League. The competition regular season began on 20 February 2026 and concluded on 3 July 2026. The top four finishers of the regular season qualified for "Super Four" tournament, which determined the league champion, and the country's berth into the 2027 CFU Club Shield. The tournament began on 7 July and concluded on 17 July 2026.

Roaring Lions were the AFA Senior Male League champions, defeating Lymers, 3–1, in the league championship match.

== Teams ==
=== Stadiums and locations ===
Note: Table lists in alphabetical order.

| Team | Location | Stadium | Capacity |
|---|---|---|---|
| ALHCS Spartan | The Valley | JRW Park | 200 |
| Attackers | Stoney Ground | Little Dix Field | 100 |
| Diamond | The Valley | JRW Park | 200 |
| Doc's United | The Valley | JRW Park | 200 |
| Eagle Claw | The Valley | Guishard Centre | 1,100 |
| East Enders | East End | Morris Vanterpool Primary School | 100 |
| Lymers | The Valley | Guishard Centre | 1,100 |
| Roaring Lions | The Valley | Ronald Webster Park | 4,000 |
| Uprising | The Valley | Guishard Centre | 1,100 |
| West End Predators | West End | Immanuel Methodist Church | 100 |

== Table ==
| Pos | Team | Pld | W | D | L | GF | GA | GD | Pts | Qualification or relegation |
|---|---|---|---|---|---|---|---|---|---|---|
| 1 | Attackers | 18 | 13 | 2 | 3 | 64 | 16 | +48 | 41 | Playoffs |
| 2 | Roaring Lions (C) | 18 | 12 | 3 | 3 | 63 | 15 | +48 | 39 | Playoffs |
| 3 | Doc's United | 18 | 12 | 2 | 4 | 54 | 22 | +32 | 38 | Playoffs |
| 4 | Lymers | 18 | 8 | 6 | 4 | 38 | 22 | +16 | 30 | Playoffs |
| 5 | Uprising | 18 | 8 | 5 | 5 | 48 | 23 | +25 | 29 | |
| 6 | ALHCS Spartan | 18 | 8 | 3 | 7 | 41 | 24 | +17 | 27 | |
| 7 | Diamond | 18 | 8 | 2 | 8 | 33 | 54 | −21 | 26 | |
| 8 | East Enders | 18 | 4 | 2 | 12 | 24 | 41 | −17 | 14 | |
| 9 | Eagle Claw | 18 | 2 | 1 | 15 | 14 | 106 | −92 | 7 | |
| 10 | West End Predators | 18 | 1 | 2 | 15 | 21 | 77 | −56 | 5 | |

Source: RSSSF
(C) Champions

== Playoffs ==
=== Bracket ===
Semifinals
July 7
Attackers | 4 (2)
Lymers (p) | 4 (4)
July 8
Roaring Lions | 6
Doc's United | 3

Final
July 17
Lymers | 1
Roaring Lions | 3

=== Semifinals ===
7 July 2026

| Attackers | 4–4 (a.e.t.) | Lymers |
|---|---|---|
| Abraham 7'; Alexander 30' (pen.); Williams 41'; Connor 90+6' | Report | Brooks 37' (o.g.); T. Williams 49' (o.g.); Paul 79'; J. Williams 90+1' (pen.) |
Penalties
| Alexander (penalty missed); Abraham (penalty scored); Williams (penalty scored); Lloyd (penalty missed) | 2–4 | (penalty scored) J. Williams; (penalty scored) Richardson; (penalty missed) Bailey; (penalty scored) Herbert; (penalty scored) Bradshaw |

Ronald Webster Park, The Valley
Attendance: 150
Referee: Kevahn Hawley (Anguilla)

8 July 2026

| Roaring Lions | 6–3 | Doc's United |
|---|---|---|
| Fleming 11'; Walker 24'; C. Williams 37', 90+23'; Leveret-Francis 90+12'; Derrick 90+17' | Report | Connor 44'; Gayle 45+7'; Bique 83' |

Ronald Webster Park, The Valley
Attendance: 150

=== Consolation match ===
16 July 2026

| Attackers | 3–0 (w/o) | Doc's United |

Ronald Webster Park, The Valley

=== Final ===
17 July 2026

| Lymers | 1–3 | Roaring Lions |

Ronald Webster Park, The Valley
