= 2020 AFA Senior Male League =

AFA Senior Male League
- Season: 2020
- Dates: February 1 – July 12
- Champions: Roaring Lions
- Caribbean Club Shield: Roaring Lions
- Matches played: 49
- Goals scored: 208 (4.24 per match)
- Top goalscorer: (Jamaica) Oliver Walker (18 goals)
- Biggest home win: RLFC 12–0 DFC (15 Feb. 2020)
- Biggest away win: ALHCS 0–13 RLFC (14 Mar. 2020)
- Highest scoring: 13 goals ALHCS 0–13 RLFC (14 Mar. 2020)
- Longest winning run: 7 games: Roaring Lions (2 Feb. – 17 Jun. 2020)
- Longest unbeaten run: 12 games: Roaring Lions (2 Feb. – 12 Jul. 2020)
- Longest winless run: 9 games: ALHCS Spartan (5 Feb. – 1 Jul. 2020)

The 2020 AFA Senior Male League was the 21st season of the AFA Senior Male League, the men's football league in Anguilla. The season began on February 1, 2020, and was suspended on March 15, 2020, due to the ongoing COVID-19 pandemic. The season resumed behind closed doors on June 17, 2020, with the regular season concluding on July 1, 2020.

Roaring Lions won the AFA League by winning the championship over Doc's United, 3–0 on July 12, 2020.

== Teams ==
=== Stadiums and locations ===
Note: Table lists in alphabetical order.

Team	Location	Stadium	Capacity
AFA Development Team	The Valley	Ronald Webster Park	4,000
ALHCS Spartan	The Valley	JRW Park	200
Attackers	Stoney Ground	Little Dix Field	100
Diamond	The Valley	JRW Park	200
Doc's United	The Valley	JRW Park	200
Enforcers	The Valley	Guishard Centre	1,100
Kicks United	The Valley	Ronald Webster Park	4,000
Lymers FC	The Valley	Guishard Centre	1,100
Roaring Lions	The Valley	Ronald Webster Park	4,000
Uprising	The Valley	Guishard Centre	1,100

== Table ==
Pos	Team	Pld	W	D	L	GF	GA	GD	Pts	Qualification or relegation
1	Roaring Lions (C)	9	8	1	0	60	0	+60	25	Playoffs
2	Kicks United	9	8	0	1	36	6	+30	24	Playoffs
3	Doc's United	9	6	2	1	27	10	+17	20	Playoffs
4	Enforcers	9	6	0	3	26	10	+16	18	Playoffs
5	Attackers	9	4	1	4	14	23	−9	13	
6	Lymers	9	3	0	6	12	27	−15	9	
7	Diamond	9	2	2	5	12	31	−19	8	
8	Up Rising	9	2	1	6	7	36	−29	7	
9	AFA Development Team	9	1	2	6	7	22	−15	5	
10	ALHCS Spartan	9	0	1	8	7	43	−36	1	

Source: RSSSF
(C) Champions

== Playoffs ==
=== Bracket ===
Semifinals
1	Roaring Lions	5
4	Enforcers	2
2	Kicks United	0
3	Doc's United	2

Final
1	Roaring Lions	3
3	Doc's United	0
Third place match
4	Enforcers	1
2	Kicks United (a.e.t.)	3

=== Results ===
==== Semifinals ====
8 July 2020

Roaring Lions	5–2	Enforcers
Smith 21', 89' (pen.); Walker 46', 58'; Benjamin 76'	Report	Isaacs 31', 45+1'

Raymond E. Guishard Field, The Valley
Attendance: 200

8 July 2020

Kicks United	0–2	Doc's United
	Report

Raymond E. Guishard Field, The Valley
Attendance: 200

==== Third place ====
12 July 2020
16:00 EDT

Enforcers	1–3 (a.e.t.)	Kicks United
Isaacs 8'	Report	Charles 79'; Allen 94', 111'

Raymond E. Guishard Field, The Valley
Attendance: 300

==== Final ====
12 July 2020
19:00 EDT

Roaring Lions	3–0	Doc's United
Smith 24'; Richardson 42', 63'	Report

Raymond E. Guishard Field, The Valley
Attendance: 500

== Commissioner's Cup ==
The 2020 AFA League Commissioner's Cup was a knockout tournament held in Anguilla ahead of the 2020 AFA Senior Male League. The tournament consisted of three teams and was played from 27 January to 31 January 2020.

Enforcers won the Cup, beating Doc's United on penalties after extra time.

Semifinal		Final
		Enforcers (pen.)	4 (4)
Enforcers	4	Doc's United	4 (3)
Prospect United	3
