= 2014–15 AFA Senior Male League =

Football league season

In the 2014–15 football season, the Anguillaian AFA Senior Male League was won by Kicks United FC.

== Table ==
Pos	Team	Pld	W	D	L	GF	GA	GD	Pts
1	Kicks United FC (C)	12	8	3	1	41	7	+34	27
2	Roaring Lions FC	12	8	3	1	41	10	+31	27
3	Attackers FC	12	8	3	1	28	8	+20	27
4	Salsa Ballers FC	12	6	1	5	28	18	+10	19
5	ALHCS Spartan FC	12	3	0	9	12	30	−18	9
6	Diamond FC	12	2	0	10	13	34	−21	6
7	Doc's United FC	12	2	0	10	5	61	−56	6

(C) Champions
