= AFA President's Cup =

Association football tournament in Anguilla

- Organiser(s): Anguilla
- Founded: 2006
- Region: Caribbean Football Union
- Qualifier for: CFU Club Shield
- Related competitions: AFA Senior Male League; Orlando Johnson Cup; AFA Champions League
- Current champions: Attackers
- Most championships: Attackers (6)

The AFA President's Cup (formerly the AFA Knock-Out Tournament from 2006 to 2017) is the top knockout tournament of the Anguillian football. The cup was created in 2006.

Attackers are the defending champions, and the most successful cup champions, having won the tournament six times.

== Finals ==
AFA President's and Knock-Out Tournament Cup finals
Ed.	Season	Champions	Score	Runners–up
1	2006–07	Spartan	1–0	Roaring Lions
2	2007–08	Attackers	6–2	Roaring Lions
3	2008–09	Attackers (2)	6–1	Strikers
4	2009–10	Roaring Lions	3–1	Attackers
5	2010–11	Kicks United	2–0	Roaring Lions
—	2011–12	Not held		
6	2012–13	Attackers (3)	4–0	Doc's United
—	2013–14	Not held		
7	2014–15	Kicks United (2)	3–0	Salsa Ballers
8	2015–16	Attackers (4)	4–2	Diamond
—	2016–17	Not held		
9	2017–18	Kicks United (3)	1–1 (6–5 (p))	Enforcers
10	2018–19	Roaring Lions (2)	3–0	Lymers
11	2020	Doc's United	5–1	Enforcers
—	2021	Canceled due to COVID-19 concerns		
12	2022	Attackers (5)	2–2 (5–3 (p))	Doc's United
—	2023–25	Not held		
13	2026	Attackers (6)	2–0	Roaring Lions

== See also ==
- AFA Senior Male League
- Orlando Johnson Football Tournament
- Soccerama
