= 2016–17 AFA Senior Male League =

AFA Senior Male League
- Season: 2016–17

The 2016–17 AFA Senior Male League is the eighteenth season of the AFA Senior Male League, the only football league in Anguilla. The season began on 15 October 2016.

The league was won by Roaring Lions.

== Teams ==
Nine teams began the season. Kicks United and Roaring Lions returned to the league after withdrawing last season. Police and Uprising were added to the league.

== Standings ==
Final table not available. Reported table:

Pos	Team	Pld	W	D	L	GF	GA	GD	Pts
1	Roaring Lions (C)	4	4	0	0	19	0	+19	12
2	Kicks United FC	3	2	1	0	11	2	+9	7
3	Salsa Ballers	3	2	1	0	5	0	+5	7
4	Attackers	3	2	0	1	8	4	+4	6
5	ALHCS Spartan	4	1	2	1	9	7	+2	5
6	Diamond	4	1	1	2	3	11	−8	4
7	Uprising FC	3	1	0	2	3	11	−8	3
8	Police	4	0	1	3	7	14	−7	1
9	Doc's United	4	0	0	4	2	18	−16	0

(C) Champions
