= 2015–16 AFA Senior Male League =

AFA Senior Male League
- Season: 2015–16
- Champions: Salsa Ballers FC
- Matches: 20
- Goals: 88 (4.4 per match)
- Biggest home win: Diamond FC 6-0 ALHCS Spartan
- Biggest away win: Dock's United 1-12 Salsa Ballers FC

The 2015–16 AFA Senior Male League is the seventeenth season of the AFA Senior Male League, the only football league in Anguilla. The season began on 15 November 2015. The league was won by Salsa Ballers FC for the first time.

== Teams ==
Five teams began the season. From the seven teams in the league in the previous season Kicks United FC withdrew on 22 October 2015 claiming maltreatment from the Anguillan Football Association. Roaring Lions FC withdrew claiming stagnation and a lack of viable chances for their players in Anguillan football.

== League table ==
Pos	Team	Pld	W	D	L	GF	GA	GD	Pts
1	Salsa Ballers	8	6	1	1	30	5	+25	19
2	Diamond	8	5	1	2	21	7	+14	16
3	Attackers	8	4	1	3	20	15	+5	13
4	ALHCS Spartan	8	3	1	4	17	17	0	10
5	Doc's United FC	8	0	0	8	3	47	−44	0

Table correct to 7 February 2016.
