= 2018 in association football =

The following were the scheduled events of association football for the year 2018 throughout the world.

== Events ==
=== Men's national teams ===
- 31 May – 10 June: 2018 ConIFA World Football Cup for non-FIFA nations in England
  - (gold) : Kárpátalja
  - (silver) : Northern Cyprus
  - (bronze) : Padania
  - 4th: Székely Land
- 14 June – 15 July: 2018 FIFA World Cup in Russia
  - (gold) : France
  - (silver) : Croatia
  - (bronze) : Belgium
  - 4th: England

==== AFC ====
- 22–25 March: 2018 King's Cup in Thailand
  - (gold) : Slovakia
  - (silver) : Thailand
  - (bronze) : Gabon
  - 4th: United Arab Emirates
- 22–26 March: 2018 China Cup in Nanning
  - (gold) : Uruguay
  - (silver) : Wales
  - (bronze) : Czech Republic
  - 4th: China
- 22–27 March: 2018 International Friendship Championship in Iraq
  - (gold) : Qatar
  - (silver) : Syria
  - (bronze) : Iraq
- 1–10 June: 2018 Intercontinental Cup in India.
  - (gold) : India
  - (silver) : Kenya
  - (bronze) : New Zealand
  - 4th: Chinese Taipei
- 4–15 September: 2018 SAFF Championship in Bangladesh
  - (gold) : Maldives
  - (silver) : India
- 8 November – 15 December: 2018 AFF Championship
  - (gold) : Vietnam
  - (silver) : Malaysia

==== CAF ====
- 13 January – 4 February: 2018 African Nations Championship in Morocco (for players from national championships only)
  - (gold) : Morocco
  - (silver) : Nigeria
  - (bronze) : Sudan
  - 4th: Libya
- 22–24 March: 2018 Four Nations Tournament in Zambia
  - (gold) : South Africa
  - (silver) : Zambia
  - (bronze) : Angola
  - 4th: Zimbabwe

==== UEFA ====
- 6 September – 20 November: 2018–19 UEFA Nations League (pool stage)

=== Youth ===
- 9–27 January: 2018 AFC U-23 Championship in China
  - (gold) : Uzbekistan
  - (silver) : Vietnam
  - (bronze) : Qatar
  - 4th: South Korea
- 24 April – 5 May: 2018 WAFU Zone A U-20 Tournament in Liberia
  - (gold) : Gambia
  - (silver) : Liberia
  - (bronze) : Mali
  - 4th: Ivory Coast
- 4–20 May: 2018 UEFA European Under-17 Championship in England
  - (gold) : Netherlands
  - (silver) : Italy
- 2–14 July: 2018 AFF U-19 Youth Championship in Indonesia
  - (gold) : Malaysia
  - (silver) : Myanmar
  - (bronze) : Indonesia
  - 4th: Thailand
- 16–29 July: 2018 UEFA European Under-19 Championship in Finland
  - (gold) : Portugal
  - (silver) : Italy
- 19 July – 3 August: 2018 Central American and Caribbean Games (under-21) in Colombia
  - (gold) : Colombia
  - (silver) : Venezuela
  - (bronze) : Honduras
  - 4th: Haiti
- 29 July – 11 August: 2018 AFF U-16 Youth Championship in Indonesia
  - (gold) : Indonesia
  - (silver) : Thailand
  - (bronze) : Malaysia
  - 4th: Myanmar
- 18 August – 2 September: 2018 Asian Games (under-23) in Indonesia
  - (gold) : South Korea
  - (silver) : Japan
  - (bronze) : United Arab Emirates
  - 4th: Vietnam
- 20 September – 7 October: 2018 AFC U-16 Championship in Malaysia
  - (gold) : Japan
  - (silver) : Tajikistan
- 18 October – 4 November: 2018 AFC U-19 Championship in Indonesia
  - (gold) : Saudi Arabia
  - (silver) : South Korea
- 30 November – 13 December: 2018 COSAFA U-20 Cup in Zambia
  - (gold) : South Africa
  - (silver) : Zimbabwe
  - (bronze) : Angola
  - 4th: Zambia
- 6 – 16 December: WAFU UFOA B U20 Championship in Togo
  - (gold) : Senegal
  - (silver) : Nigeria
  - (bronze) : Mali
  - 4th: Niger

=== Women's ===
- 10–24 February: 2018 WAFU Women's Cup in Ivory Coast (regional)
  - (gold) : Ghana
  - (silver) : Ivory Coast
  - (bronze) : Nigeria
  - 4th: Mali
- 4–22 April: 2018 Copa América Femenina in Chile
  - (gold) : Brazil
  - (silver) : Chile
  - (bronze) : Argentina
  - 4th: Colombia
- 6–20 April: 2018 AFC Women's Asian Cup in Jordan
  - (gold) : Japan
  - (silver) : Australia
  - (bronze) : China
  - 4th: Thailand
- 18–29 April: 2018 CFU Women's Challenge Series
  - Group A Winner: Saint Lucia
  - Group B Winner: Cuba
  - Group C Winner: Haiti
  - Group D Winner: Antigua and Barbuda
  - Group E Winner: Trinidad and Tobago
- 16–31 August: 2018 Asian Games in Indonesia
  - (gold) : Japan
  - (silver) : China
  - (bronze) : South Korea
  - 4th: Chinese Taipei
- 4–17 October 2018 CONCACAF Women's Championship
  - (gold) : United States
  - (silver) : Canada
  - (bronze) : Jamaica
  - 4th: Panama
- 17 November – 1 December: 2018 Africa Women Cup of Nations in Ghana
  - (gold) : Nigeria
  - (silver) : South Africa
  - (bronze) : Cameroon
  - 4th: Mali
- 17 November – 1 December: 2018 OFC Women's Nations Cup in New Caledonia
  - (gold) : New Zealand
  - (silver) : Fiji
  - (bronze) : Papua New Guinea
  - 4th: New Caledonia
- 23 November – 1 December: 2018 CAFA Women's Championship in Uzbekistan
  - (gold) : Uzbekistan
  - (silver) : Iran
  - (bronze) : Tajikistan
  - 4th: Kyrgyzstan

International tournaments

- 26 February – 6 March: 2018 Turkish Women’s Cup in Turkey
  - (gold) : France B
  - (silver) : Mexico
  - (bronze) : Ukraine
  - 4th: Poland
- 28 February – 7 March: 2018 Cyprus Women's Cup in Cyprus
  - (gold) : Spain
  - (silver) : Italy
  - (bronze) : North Korea
  - 4th: Switzerland
- 28 February – 7 March: 2018 Algarve Cup in Portugal
  - (gold) : Netherlands and Sweden
  - (bronze) : Portugal
  - 4th: Australia

The final game was called off due to heavy rain and adverse weather conditions. Both The Netherlands and Sweden were awarded first place.

- 1–7 March: 2018 SheBelieves Cup in the United States
  - (gold) : United States
  - (silver) : England
  - (bronze) : France
  - 4th: Germany
- 26 July – 2 August: 2018 Tournament of Nations in the United States
  - (gold) : United States
  - (silver) : Australia
  - (bronze) : Brazil
  - 4th: Japan

=== Women's youth ===
- 13–31 January: 2018 South American Under-20 Women's Football Championship in Ecuador
  - (gold) : Brazil
  - (silver) : Paraguay
  - (bronze) : Colombia
  - 4th: Venezuela
- 18–28 January: 2018 CONCACAF Women's U-20 Championship in Trinidad and Tobago
  - (gold) : Mexico
  - (silver) : United States
  - (bronze) : Haiti
  - 4th: Canada
- 7–25 March: 2018 South American Under-17 Women's Football Championship in Argentina
  - (gold) : Brazil
  - (silver) : Colombia
  - (bronze) : Uruguay
  - 4th: Venezuela
- 19–22 April; 6–12 June: 2018 CONCACAF Women's U-17 Championship in Nicaragua and the United States
  - On 22 April 2018, four days into the tournament, CONCACAF announced the remainder of the championship was cancelled immediately due to security concerns caused by civil unrest in Nicaragua. The tournament resumed on 6 June and concluded on 12 June, with the remainder of the tournament played at the IMG Academy in Bradenton, Florida, United States.
  - (gold) : United States
  - (silver) : Mexico
  - (bronze) : Canada
  - 4th: Haiti
- 1–13 May: 2018 AFF U-16 Girls' Championship in (Indonesia) Palembang
  - (gold) : Thailand
  - (silver) : Myanmar
  - (bronze) : Vietnam
  - 4th: Laos
- 9–21 May: 2018 UEFA Women's Under-17 Championship in Lithuania
  - (gold) : Spain
  - (silver) : Germany
  - (bronze) : Finland
  - 4th: England
- 5–10 June: 2018 Sud Ladies Cup in France
  - (gold) : United States
  - (silver) : France
  - (bronze) : Germany
  - 4th: Haiti
- 18–30 July: 2018 UEFA Women's Under-19 Championship in Switzerland
  - (gold) : Spain
  - (silver) : Germany
- 7–24 August: 2018 FIFA U-20 Women's World Cup in France
  - (gold) : Japan
  - (silver) : Spain
  - (bronze) : England
  - 4th: France
- 20 November – 1 December: 2018 FIFA U-17 Women's World Cup in Uruguay
  - (gold) : Spain
  - (silver) : Mexico
  - (bronze) : New Zealand
  - 4th: Canada

== News ==
- 27 April – The U.S. NCAA tabled (placed on hold) a proposal passed in March by its soccer rules committee, which governs both men's and women's play, that would have called for the NCAA to adopt FIFA rules regarding timekeeping, with the official time being kept on the field by the referee and stadium clocks counting up instead of down. This means that the existing timekeeping system, with the official time being maintained by a visible, downward-counting clock, will remain in place.

== Fixed dates for national team matches ==
Scheduled international matches per their International Match Calendar. Also known as FIFA International Day/Date(s).

- 19–27 March
- 3–11 September
- 8–16 October
- 12–20 November

== Club continental champions ==
=== Men ===
Region	Tournament	Defending champion	Champion	Title	Last honour
AFC (Asia)	2018 AFC Champions League	(Japan) Urawa Red Diamonds	(Japan) Kashima Antlers	1st	—
AFC (Asia)	2018 AFC Cup	(Iraq) Al-Quwa Al-Jawiya	(Iraq) Al-Quwa Al-Jawiya	3rd	2017
CAF (Africa)	2018 CAF Champions League	(Morocco) Wydad Casablanca	(Tunisia) Espérance	3rd	2011
CAF (Africa)	2018 CAF Confederation Cup	(Democratic Republic of the Congo) TP Mazembe	(Morocco) Raja Casablanca	2nd	2003
CAF (Africa)	2018 CAF Super Cup	(South Africa) Mamelodi Sundowns	(Morocco) Wydad Casablanca	1st	—
CONCACAF (North and Central America, Caribbean)	2018 CONCACAF Champions League	(Mexico) Pachuca	(Mexico) Guadalajara	2nd	1962
CONCACAF (North and Central America, Caribbean)	2018 CONCACAF League	(Honduras) Olimpia	(Costa Rica) Herediano	1st	—
CONCACAF (North and Central America, Caribbean)	2018 Campeones Cup	None (inaugural event)	(Mexico) Tigres	1st	—
CONCACAF (North and Central America, Caribbean)	2018 CFU Club Championship	(Dominican Republic) Cibao	(Dominican Republic) Atlético Pantoja	1st	—
CONCACAF (North and Central America, Caribbean)	2018 Caribbean Club Shield	None (inaugural event)	(Martinique) Club Franciscain	1st	—
CONMEBOL (South America)	2018 Copa Libertadores	(Brazil) Grêmio	(Argentina) River Plate	4th	2015
CONMEBOL (South America)	2018 Copa Sudamericana	(Argentina) Independiente	(Brazil) Atlético Paranaense	1st	—
CONMEBOL (South America)	2018 Recopa Sudamericana	(Colombia) Atlético Nacional	(Brazil) Grêmio	2nd	1996
OFC (Oceania)	2018 OFC Champions League	(New Zealand) Auckland City	(New Zealand) Team Wellington	1st	—
UEFA (Europe)	2017–18 UEFA Champions League	(Spain) Real Madrid	(Spain) Real Madrid	13th	2016–17
UEFA (Europe)	2017–18 UEFA Europa League	(England) Manchester United	(Spain) Atlético Madrid	3rd	2011–12
UEFA (Europe)	2018 UEFA Super Cup	(Spain) Real Madrid	(Spain) Atlético Madrid	3rd	2012
FIFA (Worldwide)	2018 FIFA Club World Cup	(Spain) Real Madrid	(Spain) Real Madrid	4th	2017
FIFA (Worldwide)	2018 International Champions Cup	(England) Tottenham Hotspur	(Germany) Borussia Dortmund	1st	—

=== Women ===
Region	Tournament	Defending champion	Champion	Title	Last honour
CONMEBOL (South America)	2018 Copa Libertadores Femenina	(Brazil) Audax/Corinthians	(Colombia) Atlético Huila	1st	2018
UEFA (Europe)	2017–18 UEFA Women's Champions League	(France) Lyon	(France) Lyon	5th	2016–17

== Domestic leagues ==
=== UEFA ===
Nation	Tournament	Champion	Second place	Title	Last honour
Albania	2017–18 Albanian Superliga	Skënderbeu Korçë	Kukësi	8th	2015–16
Andorra	2017–18 Primera Divisió	Santa Coloma	Engordany	12th	2016–17
Armenia	2017–18 Armenian Premier League	Alashkert	Banants	3rd	2016–17
Austria	2017–18 Austrian Football Bundesliga	Red Bull Salzburg	Sturm Graz	12th	2016–17
Azerbaijan	2017–18 Azerbaijan Premier League	Qarabağ	Gabala	6th	2016–17
Belarus	2018 Belarusian Premier League	BATE Borisov	Shakhtyor Soligorsk	15th	2017
Belgium	2017–18 Belgian First Division A	Brugge	Standard Liège	15th	2015–16
Bosnia and Herzegovina	2017–18 Premier League of Bosnia and Herzegovina	Zrinjski Mostar	Željezničar Sarajevo	6th	2016–17
Bulgaria	2017–18 Parva Liga	Ludogorets Razgrad	CSKA Sofia	7th	2016–17
Croatia	2017–18 Croatian First Football League	Dinamo Zagreb	Rijeka	19th	2015–16
Cyprus	2017–18 Cypriot First Division	APOEL	Apollon Limassol	27th	2016–17
Czech Republic	2017–18 Czech First League	Viktoria Plzeň	Slavia Prague	5th	2015–16
Denmark	2017–18 Danish Superliga	Midtljylland	Brøndby	2nd	2014–15
England	2017–18 Premier League	Manchester City	Manchester United	5th	2013–14
Estonia	2018 Meistriliiga	Nõmme Kalju	FCI Levadia	2nd	2012
Faroe Islands	2018 Effodeildin	HB	NSÍ Runavík	23rd	2013
Finland	2018 Veikkausliiga	HJK	RoPS	29th	2017
France	2017–18 Ligue 1	Paris Saint-Germain	Monaco	7th	2015–16
(Georgia (country)) Georgia	2018 Erovnuli Liga	Saburtalo Tbilisi	Dinamo Tbilisi	1st	—
Germany	2017–18 Bundesliga	Bayern Munich	Schalke 04	28th	2016–17
Gibraltar	2017–18 Gibraltar Premier Division	Lincoln Red Imps	Europa	23rd	2015–16
Greece	2017–18 Super League Greece	AEK Athens	PAOK	12th	1993–94
Hungary	2017–18 Nemzeti Bajnokság I	Videoton	Ferencváros	3rd	2014–15
Iceland	2018 Úrvalsdeild	Valur	Breiðablik	21st	2017
(Republic of Ireland) Ireland	2018 League of Ireland Premier Division	Dundalk	Cork City	13th	2016
Israel	2017–18 Israeli Premier League	Hapoel Be'er Sheva	Maccabi Tel Aviv	5th	2016–17
Italy	2017–18 Serie A	Juventus	Napoli	34th	2016–17
Kazakhstan	2018 Kazakhstan Premier League	Astana	Kairat	5th	2017
Kosovo	2017–18 Football Superleague of Kosovo	Drita	Prishtina	2nd	2002–03
Latvia	2018 Latvian Higher League	Riga	Ventspils	1st	—
Lithuania	2018 A Lyga	Sūduva	Žalgiris	2nd	2017
Luxembourg	2017–18 Luxembourg National Division	Dudelange	Niederkorn	14th	2016–17
(North Macedonia) Macedonia	2017–18 Macedonian First Football League	Shkëndija	Vardar	2nd	2010–11
Malta	2017–18 Maltese Premier League	Valletta	Balzan	24th	2015–16
Moldova	2018 Moldovan National Division	Sheriff Tiraspol	Milsami Orhei	17th	2017
Montenegro	2017–18 Montenegrin First League	Sutjeska Nikšić	Budućnost	3rd	2013–14
Netherlands	2017–18 Eredivisie	PSV	Ajax	24th	2015–16
Northern Ireland	2017–18 NIFL Premiership	Crusaders	Coleraine	7th	2015–16
Norway	2018 Eliteserien	Rosenborg	Molde	26th	2017
Poland	2017–18 Ekstraklasa	Legia Warsaw	Jagiellonia Białystok	13th	2016–17
Portugal	2017–18 Primeira Liga	Porto	Benfica	28th	2012–13
Romania	2017–18 Liga I	CFR Cluj	FCSB	4th	2011–12
Russia	2017–18 Russian Premier League	Lokomotiv Moscow	CSKA Moscow	3rd	2004
San Marino	2017–18 Campionato Sammarinese di Calcio	La Fiorita	Folgore	5th	2016–17
Scotland	2017–18 Scottish Premiership	Celtic	Aberdeen	49th	2016–17
Serbia	2017–18 Serbian SuperLiga	Red Star Belgrade	Partizan	28th	2015–16
Slovakia	2017–18 Slovak First Football League	Spartak Trnava	Slovan Bratislava	6th	1972–73
Slovenia	2017–18 Slovenian PrvaLiga	Olimpija Ljubljana	Maribor	2nd	2015–16
Spain	2017–18 La Liga	Barcelona	Atlético Madrid	25th	2015–16
Sweden	2018 Allsvenskan	AIK	Norrköping	6th	2009
Switzerland	2017–18 Swiss Super League	Young Boys	Basel	12th	1985–86
Turkey	2017–18 Süper Lig	Galatasaray	Fenerbahçe	21st	2014–15
Ukraine	2017–18 Ukrainian Premier League	Shakhtar Donetsk	Dynamo Kyiv	11th	2016–17
Wales	2017–18 Welsh Premier League	The New Saints	Connah's Quay Nomads	12th	2016–17

=== AFC ===
Nation	Tournament	Champion	Second place	Title	Last honour
Afghanistan	2018 Afghan Premier League	Toofan Harirod	Shaheen Asmayee	2nd	2012
Australia	2017–18 A-League	Melbourne Victory	Newcastle Jets	4th	2014–15
Bahrain	2017–18 Bahrain First Division League	Al-Muharraq	Al-Najma	34th	2014–15
Bangladesh	2017–18 Bangladesh Football Premier League	Dhaka Abahani	Sheikh Jamal DC	6th	2016
Bhutan	2018 Bhutan National League	Transport United	Paro	1st	—
Brunei	2017–18 Brunei Super League	MS ABDB	Kota Ranger	3rd	2016
Cambodia	2018 Cambodian League	Nagaworld	Boeung Ket	3rd	2009
China	2018 Chinese Super League	Shanghai SIPG	Guangzhou Evergrande Taobao	1st	—
Chinese Taipei	2018 Taiwan Football Premier League	Tatung	Taipower	2nd	2017
(North Korea) DPR Korea	2017–18 DPR Korea Premier Football League	April 25	Ryomyong	21st	2017
(Timor-Leste) East Timor	2018 Liga Futebol Amadora	Boavista	Karketu Dili	1st	—
Guam	2017–18 Guam Soccer League	Rovers FC	LOA Heat	5th	2016–17
Hong Kong	2017–18 Hong Kong Premier League	Kitchee	Tai Po	9th	2016–17
India	2017–18 I-League	Minerva Punjab	NEROCA	1st	—
India	2017–18 Indian Super League	Chennaiyin	Bengaluru	2nd	2015 ISL
Indonesia	2018 Liga 1	Persija Jakarta	PSM Makassar	2nd	2001
Iran	2017–18 Persian Gulf Pro League	Persepolis	Zob Ahan	11th	2016–17
Iraq	2017–18 Iraqi Premier League	Al-Zawraa	Al-Quwa Al-Jawiya	14th	2015–16
Japan	2018 J1 League	Kawasaki Frontale	Sanfrecce Hiroshima	2nd	2017
Jordan	2017–18 Jordan League	Al-Wehdat	Al-Jazeera	16th	2015–16
Kuwait	2017–18 Kuwaiti Premier League	Al-Kuwait	Al-Qadsia	14th	2016–17
Kyrgyzstan	2018 Kyrgyzstan League	Dordoi	Alay	10th	2014
Laos	2018 Lao Premier League	Lao Toyota	Lao Police	3rd	2017
Lebanon	2017–18 Lebanese Premier League	Al-Ahed	Al-Nejmeh	6th	2016–17
Macau	2018 Liga de Elite	Benfica de Macau	Chao Pak Kei	5th	2017
Malaysia	2018 Malaysia Super League	Johor Darul Ta'zim	Perak	5th	2017
Maldives	2018 Dhivehi Premier League	TC Sports Club	Club Eagles	1st	—
Mongolia	2018 Mongolian Premier League	Erchim	FC Ulaanbaatar	12th	2017
Myanmar	2018 Myanmar National League	Yangon United	Shan United	5th	2015
Nepal	2017–18 Martyr's Memorial A-Division League	Not held			
Northern Mariana Islands	2018 M*League Division 1				
Oman	2017–18 Oman Professional League	Al-Suwaiq	Al-Shabab	4th	2012–13
Palestine	2017–18 West Bank Premier League	Hilal Al-Quds	Ahli Al-Khaleel	3rd	2016–17
Philippines	2018 Philippines Football League	Ceres–Negros	Kaya–Iloilo	2nd	2017
Qatar	2017–18 Qatar Stars League	Al-Duhail	Al-Sadd	6th	2016–17
Saudi Arabia	2017–18 Saudi Professional League	Al-Hilal	Al-Ahli	15th	2016–17
Singapore	2018 Singapore Premier League	Albirex Niigata (S)	Home United	3rd	2017
South Korea	2018 K League 1	Jeonbuk Hyundai Motors	Gyeongnam FC	6th	2017
Sri Lanka	2017–18 Sri Lanka Football Premier League	Colombo	Renown	3rd	2016–17
Syria	2017–18 Syrian Premier League	Al-Jaish	Al-Ittihad	16th	2016–17
Tajikistan	2018 Tajik League	Istiklol	Khujand	7th	2017
Thailand	2018 Thai League 1	Buriram United	Bangkok United	7th	2017
Turkmenistan	2018 Ýokary Liga	Altyn Asyr	Ahal	5th	2017
United Arab Emirates	2017–18 UAE Pro-League	Al Ain	Al Wahda	13th	2014–15
Uzbekistan	2018 Uzbekistan Super League	Lokomotiv Tashkent	Pakhtakor Tashkent	3rd	2017
Vietnam	2018 V.League 1	Hà Nội	FLC Thanh Hóa	4th	2016

=== CAF ===
Nation	Tournament	Champion	Second place	Title	Last honour
Algeria	2017–18 Algerian Ligue Professionnelle 1	CS Constantine	JS Saoura	2nd	1996–97
Angola	2018 Girabola	1º de Agosto	Petro de Luanda	12th	2017
Benin	2018 Benin Premier League				
Botswana	2017–18 Botswana Premier League	Township Rollers	Jwaneng Galaxy	15th	2016-17
Burkina Faso	2017–18 Burkinabé Premier League	Bobo Dioulasso	Rail Club du Kadiogo	3rd	1966
Burundi	2017–18 Burundi Premier League	Le Messager	Lydia Ludic Burundi Académic	1st	–
Cameroon	2018 Elite One	Coton Sport	UMS de Loum	15th	2015
Cape Verde	2018 Cape Verdean Football Championships	Académica da Praia	CS Mindelense	2nd	1965
Central African Republic	2018 Central African Republic League				
Chad	2018 LINAFOOT	Elect-Sport	Coton Tchad	5th	2008
Comoros	2018 Comoros Premier League	Volcan Club	Fomboni	3rd	2015
(Republic of the Congo) Congo	2018 Ligue 1 (Congo)	AS Otôho	CS La Mancha	1st	–
(Democratic Republic of the Congo) DR Congo	2017–18 Linafoot	AS Vita Club	TP Mazembe	14th	2015
Djibouti	2017–18 Djibouti Premier League	Djibouti Télécom	Garde Républicaine	7th	2016–17
Egypt	2017–18 Egyptian Premier League	Al-Ahly	Ismaily	40th	2016–17
Equatorial Guinea	2018 Equatoguinean Primera División	Leones Vegetarianos	Deportivo Unidad	2nd	2017
Eritrea	2018 Eritrean Premier League				
Ethiopia	2017–18 Ethiopian Premier League	Jimma Aba Jifar	Saint George	1st	–
Gabon	2017–18 Gabon Championnat National D1	Mangasport	AO Cercle Mbéri Sportif	9th	2015
(The Gambia) Gambia	2017–18 GFA League First Division	Gamtel FC	Real Banjul	2nd	2014–15
Ghana	2018 Ghanaian Premier League	Abandoned due to dissolution of the Ghana Football Association			
Guinea	2017–18 Guinée Championnat National	Horoya AC	Hafia FC	16th	2016–17
Guinea-Bissau	2017–18 Campeonato Nacional da Guiné-Bissau	Benfica de Bissau	UD Internacional	12th	2016–17
Ivory Coast	2017–18 Ligue 1	ASEC Mimosas	SC Gagnoa	26th	2016–17
Kenya	2018 Kenyan Premier League	Gor Mahia	Bandari	17th	2017
Lesotho	2017–18 Lesotho Premier League	Bantu	Lioli	3nd	2016–17
Liberia	2018 Liberian First Division League	Barrack Young Controllers	LPRC Oilers	4th	2016
Libya	2017–18 Libyan Premier League	Al-Nasr	Al-Ahly	2nd	1987
Madagascar	2018 THB Champions League	CNaPS Sport	Fosa Juniors FC	7th	2017
Malawi	2018 Malawi Premier Division	Big Bullets	Be Forward Wanderers	13th	2015
Mali	2018 Malian Première Division	Cancelled			
Mauritania	2017–18 Ligue 1 Mauritania	FC Nouadhibou	ASC Kédia	5th	2013–14
Mauritius	2017–18 Mauritian Premier League	Pamplemousses SC	Bolton City	5th	2016–17
Morocco	2017–18 Botola	Ittihad Tanger	Wydad Casablanca	1st	—
Mozambique	2018 Moçambola	UD Songo	Ferroviário de Maputo	2nd	2017
Namibia	2017–18 Namibia Premier League	African Stars	Black Africa	4th	2014–15
Niger	2017–18 Niger Premier League	AS SONIDEP	AS GNN	1st	—
Nigeria	2018 Nigeria Professional Football League	Ended prematurely due to administrative problems			
Rwanda	2017–18 Rwanda National Football League	APR	A.S. Kigali	17th	2015–16
São Tomé and Príncipe	2018 São Tomé and Príncipe Championship	UDRA	Porto Real	3rd	2017
Senegal	2017–18 Senegal Premier League	ASC Diaraf	Génération Foot	12th	2010
Seychelles	2018 Seychelles First Division	Côte d'Or	Red Star Defense Forces	3rd	2016
Sierra Leone	2018 Sierra Leone National Premier League				
Somalia	2018 Somali First Division	Dekedaha FC	Banadir SC	4th	1998
South Africa	2017–18 South African Premier Division	Mamelodi Sundowns	Orlando Pirates	8th	2015–16
South Sudan	2018 South Sudan Football Championship	Al Merreikh	Al Hilal Wau	1st	—
Sudan	2018 Sudan Premier League	Al Hilal	Al-Merreikh Al-Fasher	27th	2017
(Eswatini) Swaziland	2017–18 Swazi Premier League	Mbabane Swallows	Young Buffaloes	7th	2016–17
Tanzania	2017–18 Tanzanian Premier League	Simba S.C.	Azam F.C.	19th	2011–12
Togo	2017–18 Togolese Championnat National	US Koroki	Gomido FC	1st	—
Tunisia	2017–18 Tunisian Ligue Professionnelle 1	Espérance Sportive de Tunis	Club Africain	28th	2016–17
Uganda	2017–18 Uganda Super League	Vipers	KCCA	3rd	2014–15
Zambia	2018 Zambian Premier League	ZESCO United	Nkana	7th	2017
Zimbabwe	2018 Zimbabwe Premier Soccer League	Platinum	Ngezi Platinum	2nd	2017

=== CONCACAF ===
Nation	Tournament	Champion	Second place	Title	Last honour
Anguilla	2018 AFA Senior Male League	Kicks United	Roaring Lions	5th	2014–15
Antigua and Barbuda	2017–18 Antigua and Barbuda Premier Division	Hoppers	Five Islands	2nd	2015–16
Aruba	2017–18 Aruban Division di Honor	Dakota	Deportivo Nacional	16th	1995
Barbados	2018 Barbados Premier League	Weymouth Wales FC	BDF	17th	2017
Belize	2018 Premier League Closing	Belmopan Bandits	Belize Defence Force	8th	Closing 2017
Belize	2018 Premier League Opening	Belmopan Bandits	Verdes	9th	Closing 2018
Bermuda	2017–18 Bermudian Premier Division	PHC Zebras	Robin Hood	10th	2007-08
Bonaire	2017–18 Bonaire League	SV Real Rincon	SV Juventus	10th	2016–17
British Virgin Islands	2018 BVIFA National Football League	One Love United	Sugar Boys	1st	—
Cayman Islands	2017–18 Cayman Islands Premier League	Scholars International	Roma United	11th	2015–16
Costa Rica	2018 Clausura	Deportivo Saprissa	Club Sport Herediano	34th	Invierno 2016
Costa Rica	2018 Apertura	Herediano	Saprissa	27th	Verano 2017
Cuba	2018 Campeonato Nacional	Santiago de Cuba	Ciego de Ávila	2nd	2017
Curaçao	2017–18 Curaçao Sekshon Pagá	Jong Holland	VESTA	14th	1998–99
Dominica	2017–18 Dominica Premiere League	Abandoned due to hurricane damage			
Dominican Republic	2018 Liga Dominicana de Fútbol	Cibao	Atlético de San Francisco	1st	—
El Salvador	2018 Clausura	Alianza FC	Santa Tecla FC	13th	Apertura 2017
El Salvador	2018 Apertura	Santa Tecla FC	Alianza FC	4th	Clausura 2017
Guadeloupe	2017-18 Guadeloupe Division of Honour	CS Moulien	US Baie-Mahault	12th	2014–15
Guatemala	2018 Clausura	Guastatoya	Club Xelajú	1st	—
Guatemala	2018 Apertura	Guastatoya	Comunicaciones	2nd	Clausura 2018
Honduras	2018 Clausura	CD Marathón	Motagua	9th	Apertura 2010
Honduras	2018 Apertura	Motagua	CD Olimpia	16th	Clausura 2017
Jamaica	2017–18 National Premier League	Portmore United	Waterhouse	6th	2012
Mexico	2018 Liga MX Clausura	Santos Laguna	Toluca	6th	Clausura 2015
Mexico	2018 Liga MX Apertura	América	Cruz Azul	13th	Apertura 2014
Nicaragua	2018 Clausura	Diriangén	Real Estelí	26th	2006
Nicaragua	2018 Apertura	Managua	Real Estelí	1st	—
Panama	2018 Clausura	Independiente	Tauro	1st	—
Panama	2018 Apertura	Tauro	Costa del Este	14th	Clausura 2017
Suriname	2017–18 SVB Topklasse	Robinhood	Notch	24th	2011–12
Trinidad and Tobago	2018 TT Pro League	W Connection	Central	6th	2013–14
(United States Virgin Islands) U.S. Virgin Islands	2018 U.S. Virgin Islands Championship	Not held			
United States & Canada	2018 Major League Soccer season	Atlanta United	Portland Timbers	1st	—

=== CONMEBOL ===
Nation	Tournament	Champion	Second place	Title	Last honour
Argentina	2017–18 Argentine Primera División	Boca Juniors	Godoy Cruz	33rd	2016–17
Bolivia	2018 Bolivian Primera División Apertura	Jorge Wilstermann	The Strongest	14th	2016 Clausura
Bolivia	2018 Bolivian Primera División Clausura	San José	The Strongest	4th	2007 Clausura
Brazil	2018 Campeonato Brasileiro Série A	Palmeiras	Flamengo	10th	2016
Chile	2018 Chilean Primera División	Universidad Católica	Universidad de Concepción	13th	2016 Apertura
Colombia	2018 Categoría Primera A Apertura	Deportes Tolima	Atlético Nacional	2nd	2003 Finalización
Colombia	2018 Categoría Primera A Finalización	Junior	Independiente Medellín	8th	2011 Finalización
Ecuador	2018 Campeonato Ecuatoriano de Fútbol Serie A	LDU Quito	Emelec	11th	2010
Paraguay	2018 Paraguayan Primera División Apertura	Olimpia	Cerro Porteño	41st	2015 Clausura
Paraguay	2018 Paraguayan Primera División Clausura	Olimpia	Cerro Porteño	42nd	2018 Apertura
Peru	2018 Torneo Descentralizado	Sporting Cristal	Alianza Lima	19th	2016
Uruguay	2018 Uruguayan Primera División	Peñarol	Nacional	50th	2017
Venezuela	2018 Venezuelan Primera División	Zamora	Deportivo Lara	4th	2016

=== OFC ===
Nation	Tournament	Champion	Second place	Title	Last honor
Cook Islands	2018 Cook Islands Round Cup	Tupapa Maraerenga	Nikao Sokattak	13th	2017
Fiji	2018 Fiji National Football League	Lautoka	Ba	5th	2018
New Zealand	2017–18 New Zealand Football Championship	Auckland City	Team Wellington	9th	2016–17
Papua New Guinea	2018 PNG National Soccer League	Toti City	Besta United PNG	4th	2017
Solomon Islands	2018 Solomon Islands S-League	Solomon Warriors	Henderson Eels	4th	2017

== Domestic cups ==
In all tables in this section, the "last honor" refers to the champion's previous win in that specific cup competition.

=== AFC ===
Nation	Tournament	Champion	Final score	Second place	Title	Last honor
Australia	2018 FFA Cup	Adelaide United	2–1	Sydney FC	2nd	2014
Bahrain	2017–18 Bahraini FA Cup	Not held				
Bahrain	2017–18 Bahraini King's Cup	Al-Najma	1–1 (5–4 p)	Al-Muharraq SC	6th	2007
Bangladesh	2017–18 Independence Cup	Arambagh Krira Sangha	2–0	Abahani Limited	1st	—
Bangladesh	2018 Independence Cup	Bashundhara Kings	2–1 (a.e.t.)	Sheikh Russel	1st	—
China	2018 Chinese FA Cup	Beijing Sinobo Guoan	3–3(a)	Shandong Luneng Taishan	4th	2003
India	2018 Indian Super Cup	Bengaluru	4–1	East Bengal	1st	—
Iran	2017–18 Hazfi Cup	Esteghlal	1–0	Khooneh be Khooneh	7th	2011–12
Iraq	2017–18 Iraq FA Cup	Cancelled				
Iraq	2018 Iraqi Super Cup	Cancelled				
Japan	2018 Emperor's Cup	Urawa Red Diamonds	1–0	Vegalta Sendai	7th	2006
Japan	2018 J.League Cup	Shonan Bellmare	1–0	Yokohama F. Marinos	1st	–
Jordan	2017–18 Jordan FA Cup	Al-Jazeera	2–0	Shabab Al-Ordon	2nd	1984
Kuwait	2017–18 Kuwait Emir Cup	Kuwait SC	3–0	Al-Arabi	13th	2016–17
Kuwait	2017–18 Kuwait Crown Prince Cup	Qadsia	1–1 (6–5 p)	Kuwait SC	9th	2013–14
Malaysia	2018 Malaysia FA Cup	Pahang	2–0	Selangor	3rd	2014
Malaysia	2018 Malaysia Cup	Perak	3–3 (4–1 p)	Terengganu	8th	2000
Myanmar	2018 General Aung San Shield	Yangon United	2–1	Hanthawaddy Unite	2nd	2011
Oman	2017–18 Sultan Qaboos Cup	Al-Nasr	2–2 (6–5 p)	Sohar	5th	2005
Oman	2017–18 Oman Professional League Cup	Al-Shabab	2–1	Al-Nahda	1st	–
Pakistan	2018 National Challenge Cup	Airforce	2–1	WAPDA	2nd	2014
Philippines	2018 Copa Paulino Alcantara	Kaya–Iloilo	2–0	Davao Aguilas	1st	–
Qatar	2018 Emir of Qatar Cup	Al-Duhail	2–1	Al-Rayyan	2nd	2016
Qatar	2018 Qatar Cup	Al-Duhail	2–1	Al Sadd	3rd	2015
Saudi Arabia	2018 King Cup	Al-Ittihad	3–1	Al-Faisaly	9th	2013
Singapore	2018 Singapore Cup	Albirex Niigata (S)	4–1	DPMM FC	4th	2017
South Korea	2018 Korean FA Cup	Daegu FC	5–1	Ulsan Hyundai	1st	–
Syria	2018 Syrian Cup	Al-Jaish	2–0	Al-Shorta	9th	2014
Tajikistan	2018 Tajik Cup	Istiklol	1–0	Regar-TadAZ Tursunzoda	7th	2016
Thailand	2018 Thai FA Cup	Chiangrai United	3–2	Buriram United	2nd	2017
Thailand	2018 Thai League Cup	Chiangrai United	1–0	Bangkok Glass	1st	–
United Arab Emirates	2017–18 UAE President's Cup	Al Ain	2–1	Al-Wasl	7th	2014
United Arab Emirates	2018 UAE League Cup	Al Wahda	2–1	Al-Wasl	2nd	2015–16
Uzbekistan	2018 Uzbekistan Cup	AGMK	3–1	Bunyodkor	1st	–
Vietnam	2018 Vietnamese Cup	Becamex Bình Dương	3–1	FLC Thanh Hóa	3rd	2015

=== UEFA ===
Nation	Tournament	Champion	Final score	Second place	Title	Last honor
Albania	2017–18 Albanian Cup	Skënderbeu Korçë	1–0	Laçi	1st	—
Andorra	2018 Copa Constitució	Santa Coloma	2–1	Sant Julià	10th	2012
Armenia	2017–18 Armenian Cup	Gandzasar Kapan	1–1 (4–3 p)	Alashkert	1st	—
Austria	2017–18 Austrian Cup	Sturm Graz	1–0 (a.e.t.)	Red Bull Salzburg	5th	2009–10
Azerbaijan	2017–18 Azerbaijan Cup	Keşla	1–0	Gabala	1st	—
Belarus	2017–18 Belarusian Cup	Dynamo Brest	3–2	BATE Borisov	3rd	2016–17
Belgium	2017–18 Belgian Cup	Standard Liège	1–0 (a.e.t.)	Genk	8th	2015–16
Bosnia and Herzegovina	2017–18 Bosnia and Herzegovina Football Cup	Željezničar Sarajevo	6–0	Krupa	6th	2011–12
Bulgaria	2017–18 Bulgarian Cup	Slavia Sofia	0–0 (4–2 p)	Levski Sofia	8th	1995–96
Croatia	2017–18 Croatian Football Cup	Dinamo Zagreb	1–0	Hajduk Split	15th	2015–16
Cyprus	2017–18 Cypriot Cup	AEK Larnaca	2–1	Apollon Limassol	2nd	2003–04
Czech Republic	2017–18 Czech Cup	Slavia Prague	3–1	Jablonec	8th	2001–02
Denmark	2017–18 Danish Cup	Brøndby	3–1	Silkeborg	7th	2007–08
England	2017–18 FA Cup	Chelsea	1–0	Manchester United	8th	2011–12
England	2017–18 EFL Cup	Manchester City	3–0	Arsenal	5th	2015–16
Estonia	2017–18 Estonian Cup	Levadia Tallinn	1–0	Flora	9th	2013–14
Faroe Islands	2018 Faroe Islands Cup	B36 Tórshavn	2–2 (5–4 p)	Havnar Bóltfelag	6th	2006
Faroe Islands	2018 Faroe Islands Super Cup	Víkingur Gøta	1–1 (3–2 p)	NSÍ Runavík	5th	2017
Finland	2017–18 Finnish Cup	FC Inter	1–0	HJK Helsinki	2nd	2009
France	2017–18 Coupe de France	Paris Saint-Germain	2–0	Les Herbiers	12th	2016–17
France	2017–18 Coupe de la Ligue	Paris Saint-Germain	3–0	Monaco	8th	2016–17
(Georgia (country)) Georgia	2018 Georgian Cup	Torpedo Kutaisi	2–2 (4–2 p)	Gagra	4th	2016
Germany	2017–18 DFB-Pokal	Eintracht Frankfurt	3–1	Bayern Munich	5th	1987–88
Gibraltar	2017–18 Rock Cup	Europa	2–1	Mons Calpe	7th	2017
Greece	2017–18 Greek Football Cup	PAOK	2–0	AEK	6th	2016–17
Hungary	2017–18 Magyar Kupa	Újpest	2–2 (5–4 p)	Puskás Akadémia	10th	2013–14
Iceland	2018 Icelandic Cup	Stjarnan	0–0 (4–1 p)	Breiðablik	1st	—
Iceland	2018 Deildabikar	Valur	4–2	Grindavík	3rd	2011
(Republic of Ireland) Ireland	2018 FAI Cup	Dundalk	2–1	Cork City	11th	2015
(Republic of Ireland) Ireland	2018 League of Ireland Cup	Derry City	3–1	Cobh Ramblers	11th	2011
Israel	2017–18 Israel State Cup	Hapoel Haifa	3–1 (a.e.t.)	Beitar Jerusalem	4th	1973–74
Israel	2017–18 Toto Cup Al	Maccabi Tel Aviv	1–0	Hapoel Be'er Sheva	5th	2014–15
Italy	2017–18 Coppa Italia	Juventus	4–0	Milan	13th	2016–17
Kazakhstan	2018 Kazakhstan Cup	Kairat	1–0	Atyrau	9th	2017
Kazakhstan	2018 Kazakhstan Super Cup	FC Astana	3–0	FC Kairat	3rd	2015
Kosovo	2017–18 Kosovar Cup	Prishtina	1–1 (5–4 p)	Vëllaznimi	6th	2015–16
Latvia	2018 Latvian Football Cup	Riga	0–0 (5–4 p)	Ventspils	1st	—
Latvia	2018 Virsligas Cup	FK RFS	2–2 (5–4 p)	Spartaks Jūrmala	1st	—
Liechtenstein	2017–18 Liechtenstein Cup	Vaduz	3–0	Balzers	46th	2016–17
Lithuania	2018 Lithuanian Football Cup	Žalgiris	3–0	Stumbras	12th	2016
Luxembourg	2017–18 Luxembourg Cup	Racing	0–0 (4–3 p)	Hostert	1st	—
(North Macedonia) Macedonia	2017–18 Macedonian Football Cup	Shkëndija	3–0	Pelister	2nd	2015–16
Malta	2017–18 Maltese FA Trophy	Valletta	2–1	Birkirkara	14th	2013–14
Moldova	2017–18 Moldovan Cup	Milsami Orhei	2–0 (a.e.t.)	Zimbru Chișinău	2nd	2011–12
Montenegro	2017–18 Montenegrin Cup	Mladost Podgorica	2–0	Igalo	2nd	2014–15
Netherlands	2017–18 KNVB Cup	Feyenoord	3–0	AZ Alkmaar	13th	2015–16
Northern Ireland	2017–18 Irish Cup	Coleraine	3–1	Cliftonville	6th	2002–03
Northern Ireland	2017–18 NIFL Cup	Dungannon Swifts	3–1	Ballymena United	1st	—
Norway	2018 Norwegian Football Cup	Rosenborg	4–1	Strømsgodset	12th	2016
Poland	2017–18 Polish Cup	Legia Warsaw	2–1	Arka Gdynia	19th	2015–16
Portugal	2017–18 Taça de Portugal	Desportivo das Aves	2–1	Sporting CP	1st	—
Portugal	2017–18 Taça da Liga	Sporting CP	1–1 (5–4 p)	Vitória de Setúbal	1st	—
Romania	2017–18 Cupa României	Universitatea Craiova	2–0	Hermannstadt	6th	1990–91
Russia	2017–18 Russian Cup	Tosno	2–1	Avangard Kursk	1st	—
San Marino	2017–18 Coppa Titano	La Fiorita	3–2	Tre Penne	5th	2015–16
Scotland	2017–18 Scottish Cup	Celtic	2–0	Motherwell	38th	2016–17
Scotland	2017–18 Scottish League Cup (Note: The Scottish League Cup final is actually held on 26 November 2017.)	Celtic	2–0	Motherwell	17th	2016–17
Scotland	2017–18 Scottish Challenge Cup	Inverness	1–0	Dumbarton	2nd	2003–04
Serbia	2017–18 Serbian Cup	Partizan	2–1	Mladost Lučani	15th	2016–17
Slovakia	2017–18 Slovak Cup	Slovan Bratislava	3–1	Ružomberok	15th	2017–18
Slovenia	2017–18 Slovenian Cup	Olimpija	6–1	Aluminij	1st	—
Spain	2017–18 Copa del Rey	Barcelona	5–0	Sevilla	30th	2016–17
Sweden	2017–18 Svenska Cupen	Djurgården	3–0	Malmö	5th	2005
Switzerland	2017–18 Swiss Cup	Zürich	2–1	Young Boys	10th	2015–16
Turkey	2017–18 Turkish Cup	Akhisarspor	3–2	Fenerbahçe	1st	—
Ukraine	2017–18 Ukrainian Cup	Shakhtar Donetsk	2–0	Dynamo Kyiv	12th	2016–17
Wales	2017–18 Welsh Cup	Connah's Quay Nomads	4–1	Aberystwyth Town	1st	—
Wales	2017–18 Welsh League Cup	The New Saints	1–0	Cardiff Met	9th	2016–17

=== CAF ===
Nation	Tournament	Champion	Final score	Second place	Title	Last honor
Angola	2018 Angola Super Cup					
Algeria	2017–18 Algerian Cup	USM Bel Abbès	2–1	JS Kabylie	2nd	1990–91
Botswana	2017–18 Mascom Top 8 Cup	Township Rollers	4–2	Orapa United	2nd	2011–12
Egypt	2017–18 Egypt Cup	Zamalek	1–1 (5–4 p)	Smouha	26th	2015–16
Morocco	2018 Coupe du Trône					
South Africa	2017–18 Nedbank Cup	Free State Stars	1–0	Maritzburg United	1st	—
Rwanda	2018 Heroes Cup	Rayon Sports	Round Robin	APR	—	—
Tunisia	2017–18 Tunisian Cup	Club Africain	4–1	Étoile du Sahel	13th	2016–17

=== CONCACAF ===
Nation	Tournament	Champion	Final score	Second place	Title	Last honor
Canada	2018 Canadian Championship	Toronto FC	7–4	Vanconver Whitecaps	7th	2017
El Salvador	2017–18 Copa El Salvador					
Honduras	2018 Honduran Cup	Platense	2–1	Real España	3rd	1997
Mexico	Clausura 2018 Copa MX	Necaxa	1–0	Toluca	4th	1994–95
Mexico	Apertura 2018 Copa MX	Cruz Azul	2–0	Monterrey	4th	Clausura 2013
United States	2018 Lamar Hunt U.S. Open Cup	Houston Dynamo	3–0	Philadelphia Union	1st	—

=== CONMEBOL ===
Nation	Tournament	Champion	Final score	Second place	Title	Last honor
Argentina	2017–18 Copa Argentina	Rosario Central	1–1 (4–1 p)	Gimnasia y Esgrima (LP)	1st	—
Brazil	2018 Copa do Brasil	Cruzeiro	3–1	Corinthians	6th	2017
Chile	2018 Copa Chile	Palestino	4–2	Audax Italiano	3rd	1977
Colombia	2018 Copa Colombia	Atlético Nacional	4–3	Once Caldas	4th	2016
Colombia	2018 Superliga Colombiana	Millonarios	2–1	Atlético Nacional	1st	—
Paraguay	2018 Copa Paraguay	Guaraní	2–2 (5–3 p)	Olimpia	1st	—
Peru	2018 Supercopa Movistar	Alianza Lima	1–0	Sport Boys	1st	—
Uruguay	2018 Supercopa Uruguaya	Peñarol	3–1	Nacional	1st	—
Venezuela	2018 Copa Venezuela	Zulia	3–1	Aragua	2nd	2016

== Women's leagues ==
=== UEFA ===
Nation	Tournament	Champion	Second place	Title	Last honor
Albania	2017–18 Albanian Women's National Championship	KF Vllaznia Shkodër	Tirana AS	5th	2016-17
Austria	2017–18 ÖFB-Frauenliga	Sankt Pölten	USC Landhaus	4th	2017–18
Azerbaijan	2017-18 Azerbaijani Women's Football Championship	Sumqayit FK		1st	—
Belarus	2018 Belarusian Premier League (women)	FC Minsk	FC RGUOR Minsk	6th	2017
Belgium	2017–18 Super League	RSC Anderlecht	AA Gent	5th	1997–98
Bosnia and Herzegovina	2017-18 Bosnia and Herzegovina Women's Premier League	SFK 2000 Sarajevo	Radnik Bumerang	16th	2016-17
Bulgaria	2017-18 Bulgarian Women's Football Championship	FC NSA Sofia	FC Super Sport	15th	2016-17
Croatia	2017–18 Croatian Women's First Football League	Osijek	Split	22nd	2016–17
Cyprus	2017–18 Cypriot First Division	Barcelona FA	Apollon Limassol	1st	—
Czech Republic	2017–18 Czech First Division	Sparta Prague	Slavia Prague	19th	2012–13
Denmark	2017–18 Elitedivisionen	Fortuna Hjørring	Brondby	10th	2015–16
England	2017–18 FA WSL 1	Chelsea	Manchester City	2nd (Note: Does not include Chelsea's win in the one-off FA WSL Spring Series in 2017.)	2015
Estonia	2018 Naiste Meistriliiga	FC Flora (women)	Pärnu JK	1st	—
Faroe Islands	2018 1. deild kvinnur	EB/Streymur/Skála	HB	2nd	2017
Finland	2018 Naisten Liiga	PK-35 Vantaa	HJK	7th	2016
France	2017–18 Division 1 Féminine	Lyon	Paris Saint-Germain	16th	2016–17
(North Macedonia) FYR Macedonia	2017-18 Prva ŽFL	ŽFK Dragon 2014	ŽFK Tiverija Istatov	3rd	2015-16
Germany	2017–18 Frauen-Bundesliga	Wolfsburg	Bayern Munich	4th	2016–17
Gibraltar	2017–18 Gibraltar Women's Football League	Lincoln Red Imps	Lions Gibraltar	2nd	2016-17
Greece	2017-18 Greek A Division	P.A.O.K.	Aris Thessaloniki	13th	2016-17
Hungary	2017-18 Női NB I	MTK Hungária	Ferencváros	8th	2016-17
Iceland	2018 Úrvalsdeild	Breiðablik	Þór/KA	17th	2015
(Republic of Ireland) Ireland	2018 Women's National League	Wexford Youths	Shelbourne	4th	2017
Israel	2017–18 Ligat Nashim	Kiryat Gat	Ramat HaSharon	2nd	2016–17
Italy	2017–18 Serie A	Juventus	Brescia	1st	—
Kazakhstan	2018 Kazakhstani Women's Football Championship	BIIK Kazygurt	Okzhtepes	12th	2016-17
Kosovo	2017-18 Kosovo Women's Football League	KFF Mitrovica	KFF Hajvalia	1st	—
Latvia	2018 Latvian Women's League	Rīgas FS	SK Liepajas	6th	2017
Lithuania	2018 A Lyga	Gintra Universitetas	Kauno Zalgiris	17th	2017
Luxembourg	2017-18 Dames Ligue 1	Jeunesse Junglinster	SC Bettembourg	6th	2015-16
Malta	2017-18 Maltese First Division	Birkirkara	Hibernians	6th	2012-13
Moldova	2017–18 Moldovan Women Top League	Agarista-ȘS Anenii Noi	ȘS 11-Real Succes Chișinău	1st	—
Montenegro	2017-18 Montenegrin First League	ŽFK Breznica	ŽFK Ekonomist	3rd	2016-17
Netherlands	2017–18 Eredivisie	Ajax	Twente	2nd	2016–17
Northern Ireland	2018 Women's Premiership	Linfield	Glentoran Belfast United	3rd	2017
Norway	2018 Toppserien	LSK Kvinner	Klepp	6th	2017
Poland	2017–18 Ekstraliga Kobiet	Górnik Łęczna	Czarni Sosnowiec	1st	—
Portugal	2017–18 Campeonato Nacional	Sporting CP	Braga	2nd	2016–17
Romania	2017–18 Superliga	FCU Olimpia Cluj	Vasas	8th	2016–17
Russia	2018 Championship	Ryazan VDV	Chertanovo	4th	2013
Scotland	2018 SWPL 1	Glasgow City	Hibernian	13th	2017
Serbia	2017-18 Serbian SuperLiga	ŽFK Spartak Subotica	ŽFK Crvena zvezda	8th	2016-17
Slovakia	2017-18 I. liga žien	Slovan Bratislava	Partizan Bardejov	13th	2015-16
Slovenia	2017–18 Slovenian Women's League	ŽNK Olimpija Ljubljana	ŽNK Radomlje	2nd	2016–17
Spain	2017–18 Primera División	Atlético Madrid	FC Barcelona	3rd	2016–17
Sweden	2018 Damallsvenskan	Piteå	Kopparbergs/Göteborg	1st	—
Switzerland	2017-18 Nationalliga A	FC Zürich Frauen	FC Basel Frauen	21st	2015-16
Turkey	2017–18 Turkish Women's First Football League	Ataşehir Belediyespor	Beşiktaş	3rd	2011-12
Ukraine	2017-18 Ukrainian Women's League	WFC Zhytlobud-1 Kharkiv	Zhytlobud-2 Kharkiv	10th	2015
Wales	2017–18 Welsh Premier League	Cardiff Met	Swansea City	5th	2015–16

=== AFC ===
Nation	Tournament	Champion	Second place	Title	Last honor
Australia	2017–18 W-League	Melbourne City FC	Sydney FC	3rd	2016–17
Japan	2018 Nadeshiko League Division 1	NTV Beleza	INAC Kobe Leonessa	15th	2017
Philippines	2018 PFF Women's League	De La Salle University	University of Santo Tomas	2nd	2016–17

=== CONCACAF ===
Nation	Tournament	Champion	Second place	Title	Last honor
Mexico	2018 Liga MX Femenil Clausura	Tigres UANL	Monterrey	1st	—
Mexico	2018 Liga MX Femenil Apertura	Club América	Tigres UANL	1st	—
United States	2018 NWSL	North Carolina Courage	Portland Thorns FC	1st (Note: First title under the team's current identity. The franchise won the 2016 NWSL title as the Western New York Flash before relocating to North Carolina.)	—

=== CONMEBOL ===
Nation	Tournament	Champion	Second place	Title	Last honor
Brazil	2018 Campeonato Brasileiro de Futebol Feminino Série A1	Corinthians	Rio Preto	1st	—

== Women's cups ==
=== UEFA ===
Nation	Tournament	Champion	Final score	Second place	Title	Last honor
Germany	2017–18 DFB-Pokal (women)	Wolfsburg	0–0 (3–2 p)	Bayern Munich	5th	2016–17
Slovenia	2017–18 Slovenian Women's Cup					

== Second, third, fourth, and fifth leagues ==
=== CONCACAF ===
Nation	League	Champion	Final score	Second place	Title	Last honour
Canada	2018 Première Ligue de soccer du Québec	A.S. Blainville		CS Mont-Royal Outremont	2nd	2017
Canada	2018 Canadian Soccer League	FC Vorkuta	1–1 (a.e.t.) (6–5 p)	Scarborough SC	1st	

== Detailed association football results ==
=== FIFA ===
- 14 June – 15 July: 2018 FIFA World Cup in Russia
  - France defeated Croatia, 4–2, to win their second FIFA World Cup title. Belgium took third place.
- 5 – 24 August: 2018 FIFA U-20 Women's World Cup in France
  - Japan defeated Spain, 3–1, to win their first FIFA U-20 Women's World Cup title.
  - England took third place.
- 13 November – 1 December: 2018 FIFA U-17 Women's World Cup in Uruguay
  - Spain defeated Mexico, 2–1, to win their first FIFA U-17 Women's World Cup title.
  - New Zealand took third place.
- 12 – 22 December: 2018 FIFA Club World Cup in the United Arab Emirates
  - (Spain) Real Madrid C.F. defeated (United Arab Emirates) Al Ain FC, 4–1, to win their third consecutive and fourth overall FIFA Club World Cup title.
  - (Argentina) River Plate took third place.

=== World Elite Club Friendlies ===
- 10 – 20 January: 2018 Florida Cup in the United States
  - Champions: (Colombia) Atlético Nacional; Second: (Ecuador) Barcelona S.C.; Third: (Scotland) Rangers F.C.
- 20 July – 11 August: 2018 International Champions Cup
  - Champions: (England) Tottenham Hotspur F.C.; Second: (Germany) Borussia Dortmund; Third: (Italy) Inter Milan

=== Women's World Elite Club Friendlies ===
- 26 – 29 July: 2018 Women's International Champions Cup in the United States
  - (United States) North Carolina Courage defeated (France) Olympique Lyonnais, 1–0, to win their 1st Women's International Champions Cup.
  - (England) Manchester City took third place and (France) Paris SG took fourth place.

=== UEFA ===
Clubs teams

- 27 June 2017 – 26 May: 2017–18 UEFA Champions League (final in (Ukraine) Kyiv)
  - (Spain) Real Madrid C.F. defeated (England) Liverpool F.C., 3–1, to win their third consecutive and thirteenth overall UEFA Champions League title.
  - Note: Real Madrid would represent UEFA at the 2018 FIFA Club World Cup.
- 29 June 2017 – 16 May: 2017–18 UEFA Europa League (final in (France) Décines-Charpieu)
  - (Spain) Atlético Madrid defeated (France) Marseille, 3–0, to win their third UEFA Europa League title.
- 22 August 2017 – 24 May: 2017–18 UEFA Women's Champions League (final in (Ukraine) Kyiv)
  - (France) Lyon defeated (Germany) Wolfsburg, 4–1 at extra time, to win their third consecutive and fifth overall UEFA Women's Champions League title.
- 12 September 2017 – 23 April: 2017–18 UEFA Youth League (final in (Switzerland) Nyon)
  - (Spain) Barcelona defeated (England) Chelsea, 3–0, to win their second UEFA Youth League title.
- 15 August: 2018 UEFA Super Cup in (Estonia) Tallinn
  - (Spain) Atlético Madrid defeated fellow Spanish team, Real Madrid C.F., 4–2 in extra time, to win their third UEFA Super Cup title.

National teams

- 31 August 2017 – 27 March: 2017–18 Under 20 Elite League
  - Champions: Germany; Second: England; Third: Czech Republic
- 4 – 20 May: 2018 UEFA European Under-17 Championship in England
  - Netherlands defeated Italy, 4–1 in penalties and after a 2–2 score in regular play, to win their third UEFA European Under-17 Championship title.
- 9 – 21 May: 2018 UEFA Women's Under-17 Championship in Lithuania
  - Spain defeated Germany, 2–0, to win their fourth UEFA Women's Under-17 Championship title.
  - Finland took third place.
  - Note: All teams mentioned here have qualified to compete at the 2018 FIFA U-17 Women's World Cup.
- 16 – 29 July: 2018 UEFA European Under-19 Championship in Finland
  - Portugal defeated Italy, 4–3 at extra time, to win their fourth UEFA European Under-19 Championship title.
- 18 – 30 July: 2018 UEFA Women's Under-19 Championship in Switzerland
  - Spain defeated Germany, 1–0, to win their second consecutive and third overall UEFA Women's Under-19 Championship title.
- 6 September – 20 November: 2018–19 UEFA Nations League Group Stage (debut event)
  - 5 – 9 June 2019: 2018–19 UEFA Nations League Finals in Portugal (debut event)

=== CONCACAF ===
- 18 – 28 January: 2018 CONCACAF Women's U-20 Championship in Trinidad and Tobago
  - Mexico defeated the United States, 4–2 in penalties and after a 1–1 score in regular play, to win their first CONCACAF Women's U-20 Championship title.
  - Haiti took third place.
  - Note: All teams mentioned here have qualified to compete at the 2018 FIFA U-20 Women's World Cup.
- 31 January – 16 May: 2018 Caribbean Club Championship
  - (Martinique) Club Franciscain defeated (Trinidad and Tobago) Central F.C., 2–1, to win their place at the 2018 CONCACAF League.
- 20 February – 26 April: 2018 CONCACAF Champions League
  - (Mexico) C.D. Guadalajara defeated (Canada) Toronto FC, 4–2 in penalties and after a score of 3–3 in a 2-legged format, to win their second CONCACAF Champions League title.
  - Note: Guadalajara would represent CONCACAF at the 2018 FIFA Club World Cup.
- 19 – 29 April: 2018 CONCACAF Women's U-17 Championship in Nicaragua
  - Note: Event cancelled midway through the tournament, due to violent protests that led to the killing of 25 people over social security issues.
  - 6 – 12 June: Continuing of the 2018 CONCACAF Women's U-17 Championship in Bradenton, Florida
    - United States defeated Mexico, 3–2, to win their second consecutive and fourth overall CONCACAF Women's U-17 Championship title.
    - Canada took third place.
    - Note: All teams mentioned above have qualified to compete at the 2018 FIFA U-17 Women's World Cup.
- 31 July – 1 November: 2018 CONCACAF League
  - (Costa Rica) C.S. Herediano defeated (Honduras) F.C. Motagua, 3–2 on aggregate, to win their first CONCACAF League title.
- 15 – 22 August: 2018 CONCACAF Champions League U13
  - (United States) LAFC defeated (Mexico) Juniors Tampico, 2–0, to win their first CONCACAF Champions League U13 title.
- 19 – 26 August: 2018 UNCAF U-19 Tournament in Comayagua and Siguatepeque
  - Round Robin: 1. Guatemala, 2. Panama, 3. Costa Rica, 4. Honduras
- 3 September 2018 – 31 March 2020: 2019–20 CONCACAF Nations League (debut event)
- 19 September: 2018 Campeones Cup in (Canada) Toronto (debut event)
  - (Mexico) UANL defeated (Canada) Toronto FC, 3–1, to win the inaugural Campeones Cup.
- 20 – 27 October: 2018 UNCAF U-16 Tournament in Santa Catarina Pinula
  - Round Robin: 1. Panama, 2. Costa Rica, 3. Guatemala, 4. Nicaragua

=== Other tournaments ===
- 26 July – 2 August: 2018 Tournament of Nations in United States
  - Champions: United States; Second: Australia; Third: Brazil; Fourth: Japan

=== AFC ===
- 22 December 2017 – 5 January: 23rd Arabian Gulf Cup in Kuwait
  - In the final, Oman defeated United Arab Emirates, 5–4 in penalties and after a 0–0 score in regular play, to win their second Arabian Gulf Cup title.
- 9 – 27 January: 2018 AFC U-23 Championship in China
  - In the final, Uzbekistan defeated Vietnam, 2–1, after extra time, to win their 1st AFC U-23 Championship. Qatar took third place.
- 16 January – 10 November: 2018 AFC Champions League
  - (Japan) Kashima Antlers won their first AFC Champions League title after victory against their Competitors at ACL.
  - Note: Kashima Antlers would represent the AFC at the 2018 FIFA Club World Cup.
- 22 January – 27 October: 2018 AFC Cup
  - (Iraq) Al-Quwa Al-Jawiya defeated (Turkmenistan) Altyn Asyr FK, 2–0, to win their third consecutive AFC Cup title.
- 6 – 20 April: 2018 AFC Women's Asian Cup in Jordan
  - Japan defeated Australia, 1–0, to win their second AFC Women's Asian Cup title.
  - China took third place.
- 1 – 13 May: 2018 AFF U-16 Girls' Championship in (Indonesia) Palembang
  - In the final, Thailand defeated Myanmar, 1–0, to win their 2nd AFF U-16 Girls' Championship. Vietnam took third place.
- 30 June – 13 July: 2018 AFF Women's Championship in (Indonesia) Palembang
  - Thailand defeated Australia U20, 3–2, to win their third consecutive and fourth overall AFF Women's Championship title.
  - Vietnam took third place.
- 1 – 14 July: 2018 AFF U-19 Youth Championship in Gresik & Sidoarjo
  - Malaysia defeated Myanmar, 4–3, to win their first AFF U-19 Youth Championship title.
  - Indonesia took third place.
- 29 July – 11 August: 2018 AFF U-16 Youth Championship in Gresik & Sidoarjo
  - Indonesia defeated Thailand, 4–3 in penalties and after a 1–1 score in regular play, to win their first AFF U-16 Youth Championship title.
  - Malaysia took third place.
- 4 – 15 September: 2018 SAFF Championship in Bangladesh
  - Maldives defeated India, 2–1, to win their second SAFF Championship title.
- 20 September – 7 October: 2018 AFC U-16 Championship in Malaysia
  - Japan defeated Tajikistan, 1–0, to win their third AFC U-16 Championship title.
- 1 – 12 October: 2018 Bangabandhu Cup in Bangladesh
  - Palestine defeated Tajikistan, 4–3 in penalties and after a 0–0 score in regular play, to win their first Bangabandhu Cup title.
- 4 – 8 October: 2018 Yongchuan International Tournament in Chongqing
  - 1st. China, 2nd. Portugal, 3rd. Finland, 4th. Thailand
- 7 October and November: 2018 (Saudi Arabia) / (Egypt) Saudi-Egyptian Super Cup in (Saudi Arabia) Riyadh
  - (Egypt) Zamalek SC defeated (Saudi Arabia) Al-Hilal FC, 2–1, to win their 1st title.
- 18 October – 4 November: 2018 AFC U-19 Championship in Indonesia
  - Saudi Arabia defeated South Korea, 2–1, to win their third AFC U-19 Championship title.
  - Note: Both Saudi Arabia and South Korea, along with Qatar & Japan, have qualified to compete at the 2019 FIFA U-20 World Cup.
- 8 November – 15 December: 2018 AFF Championship
  - Vietnam defeated Malaysia, 3–2 on aggregate, to win their second AFF Championship title.
- 23 November – 1 December: 2018 CAFA Women's Championship in Tashkent
  - Champions: Uzbekistan; Second: Iran; Third: Tajikistan; Fourth: Kyrgyzstan; Fifth: Afghanistan

=== CAF ===
- 13 January – 4 February: 2018 African Nations Championship in Morocco
  - Morocco defeated Nigeria, 4–0, to win their first African Nations Championship title.
  - Sudan took third place.
- 24 February: 2018 CAF Super Cup in (Morocco) Casablanca
  - In the final, (Morocco) Wydad Casablanca defeated (Democratic Republic of the Congo) TP Mazembe, 1–0, to win their third CAF Super Cup.
- 14 – 29 April: 2018 CECAFA U-17 Championship in (Burundi) Ngozi, Muyinga & Gitega
  - Tanzania defeated Somalia, 2–0, to win their first CECAFA U-17 Championship title.
  - Uganda took third place.
- 9 February – 2 December: 2018 CAF Confederation Cup
  - (Morocco) Raja defeated (Democratic Republic of the Congo) AS Vita Club, 4–3 on aggregate, to win their second CAF Confederation Cup title.
- 10 February – 9 November: 2018 CAF Champions League
  - (Tunisia) Espérance de Tunis defeated (Egypt) Al Ahly, 4–3 on aggregate (2 matches), to win their third CAF Champions League title.
  - Note: Espérance de Tunis would represent CAF at the 2018 FIFA Club World Cup.
- 29 June – 13 July: 2018 Kagame Interclub Cup in (Tanzania) Dar es Salaam
  - (Tanzania) Azam defeated (Tanzania) Simba, 2–1, to win their second Kagame Interclub Cup title.
  - (Kenya) Gor Mahia took third place.
- 23 – 27 July: 2018 CECAFA Women's Championship in Rwanda
  - Round Robin Final Ranking: 1. Tanzania, 2. Uganda, 3. Ethiopia, 4. Kenya
- 12 – 22 September: 2018 COSAFA Women's Championship in South Africa
  - South Africa defeated Cameroon, 2–1, to win their fifth COSAFA Women's Championship title.
  - Uganda took third place.

=== CONMEBOL ===
- 13 – 31 January: 2018 South American Under-20 Women's Football Championship in Ecuador
  - Brazil defeated Paraguay, 8–1, to win their eighth consecutive South American Under-20 Women's Football Championship title.
  - Colombia took third place.
  - Note: Brazil and Paraguay both qualified to compete at the 2018 FIFA U-20 Women's World Cup.
- 22 January – 9 December: 2018 Copa Libertadores
  - Note: First leg took place in Buenos Aires on 11 November. Second leg took place in Madrid on 9 December.
  - (Argentina) River Plate defeated fellow Argentinian team, Boca Juniors, 5–3 on aggregate, to win their fourth Copa Libertadores title.
- 10 – 24 February: 2018 U-20 Copa Libertadores in Uruguay
  - (Uruguay) Nacional defeated (Ecuador) Independiente del Valle, 2–1, to win their first U-20 Copa Libertadores title.
  - (Uruguay) River Plate took third place.
- 13 February – 12 December: 2018 Copa Sudamericana
  - (Brazil) Atlético Paranaense defeated (Colombia) Junior, 4–3 in penalties and after a 2–2 score in regular play on aggregate, to win their first Copa Sudamericana title.
- 14 & 21 February: 2018 Recopa Sudamericana
  - (Brazil) Grêmio defeated (Argentina) Independiente, 5–4 in penalties after tying each other twice in regular play, to win their second Recopa Sudamericana title.
- 7 – 25 March: 2018 South American Under-17 Women's Football Championship in Argentina
  - Champions: Brazil; Second: Colombia; Third: Uruguay
  - Note: All three teams here have qualified to compete at the 2018 FIFA U-17 Women's World Cup.
- 4 – 22 April: 2018 Copa América Femenina in Chile
  - Champions: Brazil; Second: Chile; Third: Argentina; Fourth: Colombia
  - Note 1: Brazil has qualified to compete at the 2019 FIFA Women's World Cup and the 2020 Summer Olympics.
  - Note 2: Chile has qualified to compete at the 2019 FIFA Women's World Cup and has a place at the 2020 CAF–CONMEBOL play-off.
  - Note 3: Argentina has qualified to compete at the 2019 Pan American Games and has a place at the World Cup CONCACAF–CONMEBOL play-off.
  - Note 4: Colombia has qualified to compete at the 2019 Pan American Games.
- 8 August: 2018 Suruga Bank Championship in (Japan) Osaka
  - (Argentina) Independiente defeated (Japan) Cerezo Osaka, 1–0, to win their first Suruga Bank Championship title.
- 18 November – 2 December: 2018 Copa Libertadores Femenina in (Brazil) Manaus
  - (Colombia) Atlético Huila defeated (Brazil) Santos, 5–3 on penalties and after a 1–1 score in regular play, to win their first Copa Libertadores Femenina title.
  - (Brazil) Iranduba took third place.

Other tournaments

- 30 November: Copa RS U20 in (Brazil) Porto Alegre

=== OFC ===
- 10 February – 20 May: 2018 OFC Champions League
  - (New Zealand) Team Wellington defeated (Fiji) Lautoka F.C., 10–3 on aggregate (two matches played), to win their first OFC Champions League title.
  - Note: Team Wellington would represent the OFC at the 2018 FIFA Club World Cup.
- 5 – 18 August: 2018 OFC U-19 Championship in Tahiti
  - New Zealand defeated Tahiti, 1–0, to win their 7th OFC U-19 Championship title.
  - Note: New Zealand and Tahiti qualified for the 2019 FIFA U-20 World Cup.
- 9 – 22 September: 2018 OFC U-16 Championship in Solomon Islands
  - New Zealand defeated Solomon Islands, 0–0 (5–4 on penalties), to win their seven consecutive and eighth overall OFC U-16 Championship title.
  - Note: New Zealand and Solomon Islands qualified for the 2019 FIFA U-17 World Cup.
- 18 November – 1 December: 2018 OFC Women's Nations Cup in New Caledonia
  - New Zealand defeated Fiji, 8–0, to win their fourth consecutive and sixth overall OFC Women's Nations Cup title.
  - Papua New Guinea took third place.
  - Note: New Zealand has qualified to compete at the 2019 FIFA Women's World Cup and the 2020 Summer Olympics.

== Detailed beach soccer results ==
=== BSWW events ===
- 27 – 29 January: Persian Beach Soccer Cup 2018 in Bushehr
  - Champions: Iran; Second: Spain; Third: Ukraine; Fourth: Azerbaijan
- 3 – 10 March: Copa America de Futbol Playa 2018 in (Peru) El Boulevard de Asia
  - Champions: Brazil; Second: Paraguay; Third: Uruguay; Fourth: Ecuador
- 29 – 31 March: Copa Centroamericana de Fútbol Playa 2018 in San Luis La Herradura
  - Champions: El Salvador; Second: Panama; Third: Costa Rica; Fourth: Belize
- 6 – 8 April: BSWW Tour - CFA Belt and Road International Beach Soccer Cup 2018 in Haikou
  - Champions: Azerbaijan; Second: Hungary; Third: Czech Republic; Fourth: China
- 15 – 17 April: Eurasia Beach Soccer Cup 2018 in (Iran) Yazd
  - Champions: (Russia) Lokomotiv BSC; Second: (Iran) Moghavemat Golsapoosh; Third: (Spain) Levante UD; Fourth: (Italy) Catania BS
- 27 – 29 April: BSWW Tour - Bahamas Beach Soccer Cup 2018 in (The Bahamas) Nassau
  - Champions: Mexico; Second: Spain; Third: United States; Fourth: Bahamas
- 25 – 27 May: Nazaré Beach Soccer Cup 2018 in Portugal
  - Group H Teams: 1) (Ukraine) Artur Music; 2) (Italy) Catania BS; 3) (Russia) BSC Kristall; 4) (Italy) Viareggio BS
  - Group I Teams: 1) (Israel) Falfala Kfar Qassem; 2) (Spain) Playas de Mazarrón; 3) (Portugal) Casa Benfica de Loures; 4) (Poland) Boca Gdansk
- 28 May – 3 June: 2018 Euro Winners Cup for Men and Women in (Portugal) Nazaré
  - Men's Champions: (Portugal) S.C. Braga; Second: (Russia) BSC Kristall; Third: (Poland) KP Łódź
  - Women's Champions: (Russia) WFC Zvezda Women; Second: (England) Portsmouth Ladies BSC; Third: (Spain) AIFS Playas de San Javier Women
- 8 – 10 June: NASSC - US Open 2018 in (United States) Virginia Beach
  - For detailed results, click here.
- 15 – 17 June: BSWW Mundialito Almada 2018 in Portugal
  - Champions: Portugal; Second: Spain; Third: Japan; Fourth: Mexico
- 15 – 17 June: Talent Beach Soccer Cup 2018 in Siófok
  - Champions: Spain; Second: Poland; Third: Hungary; Fourth: France
- 6 – 8 July: Women's Euro Beach Soccer Cup Nazaré 2018 in Portugal
  - Russia defeated Spain, 2–0, in the final. Switzerland took third place.
- 13 – 15 July: Morocco Beach Soccer Cup Agadir 2018 in Morocco
  - Champions: Morocco; Second: Oman; Third: Germany; Fourth: Ukraine
- 17 – 19 August: Balaton Beach Soccer Cup 2018 in Siófok
  - Champions: United States; Second: Japan; Third: Czech Republic; Fourth: Hungary
- 17 – 19 August: BSWW Tour - Goalfun CFA China-Latin America Beach Soccer Championship Tangshan 2018 in China
  - Champions: Uruguay; Second: Mexico; Third: Chile; Fourth: China
- 5 – 7 October: Alanya Beach Soccer Cup 2018 in Turkey
  - Champions: (Russia) BSC Lokomotiv Moscow; Second: (Portugal) Sporting CP; Third: (Spain) Levante UD; Fourth: (Turkey) Alanya Belediye Spor
- 6 – 10 November: Huawei Intercontinental Beach Soccer Cup Dubai 2018 in United Arab Emirates
  - Champions: Iran; Second: Russia; Third: Brazil
- 8 – 14 December: 2018 CAF Beach Soccer Africa Cup of Nations - Egypt in Sharm El Sheikh
  - Senegal defeated Nigeria, 6–1, in the final. Egypt took third place.

=== 2018 Euro Beach Soccer League ===
- 22 – 24 June: EBSL #1 in (Azerbaijan) Baku
  - Winners: Portugal (Division A - Group 1) / Ukraine (Division A - Group 2)
- 6 – 8 July: EBSL #2 in (Portugal) Nazaré
  - Winners: Spain (Division A); Bulgaria (Division B - Group 1) / Romania (Division B - Group 2)
- 20 – 22 July: ESBL #3 in Moscow
  - Winners: Russia (Division A); Kazakhstan (Division B)
- 3 – 5 August: ESBL #4 in Minsk
  - Winners: Belarus
- 24 – 26 August: ESBL #5 in (Germany) Warnemünde
  - Winners: Spain (Division A); England (Division B)
- 6 – 9 September: Euro Beach Soccer League Superfinal & Promotion Final in Alghero
  - Superfinal: Italy defeated Spain, 7–6 in penalties and after a 2–2 score in regular play, to win their second Euro Beach Soccer League title.
    - Portugal took third place.
  - Promotion: Germany defeated Romania, 4–3 in penalties and after a 4–4 score in regular play, in the final.

== Detailed futsal results ==
=== AFC ===
- 1 – 11 February: 2018 AFC Futsal Championship in Chinese Taipei
  - In the final, Iran defeated Japan, 4–0, to win their 12th AFC Futsal Championship. Uzbekistan took third place and Iraq took fourth place.
- 2 – 12 May: 2018 AFC Women's Futsal Championship in Thailand
  - In the final, Iran defeated Japan, 5–2, to win their 2nd AFC Women Futsal Championship. Thailand took third place and Vietnam took fourth place.

=== CONMEBOL ===
- 22 – 29 April: 2018 Copa Libertadores de Futsal in (Brazil) Carlos Barbosa
  - In the final, (Brazil) Carlos Barbosa defeated (Brazil) Joinville, 4–1, to win their 5th Copa Libertadores de Futsal. (Brazil) Magnus Sorocaba Futsal-Athleta took third place and (Paraguay) Cerro Porteño took fourth place.

=== UEFA ===
- 30 January – 10 February: UEFA Futsal Euro 2018 in (Slovenia) Ljubljana
  - In the final, Portugal defeated Spain, 3–2, after extra time, to win their 1st UEFA Futsal Euro. Russia took third place and Kazakhstan took fourth place.
- 26 – 29 March: 2nd European Women's Futsal Tournament in (Netherlands) Drachten
  - In the final, (Spain) Atlético Navalcarnero defeated (Portugal) Benfica, 5–2, to win their second consecutive women's tournament. (Italy) Olimpus Key Partner Roma took third place and (Russia) SC MosPolitech took fourth place.
- 20 – 22 April: 2017–18 UEFA Futsal Cup (Final Four) in (Spain) Zaragoza
  - In the final, (Spain) Inter FS defeated (Portugal) Sporting CP, 5–2, to win their 5th UEFA Futsal Cup. (Spain) FC Barcelona took third place and (Hungary) Győri ETO took fourth place.

=== CAF ===
Other competitions

- 16 – 18 March: 1st International Futsal Tournament Mauritius 2018 in Vacoas-Phoenix
  - Winners: South Africa, 2nd place: Réunion, 3rd place: Mauritius, 4th place: Comoros

=== World ===
- 29 January – 4 February: 2018 Grand Prix de Futsal in Brusque
  - In the final, Brazil defeated Czech Republic, 4–2, to win their 10th Grand Prix de Futsal. Uruguay took third place and Costa Rica took fourth place.
- 19 – 26 August: 16th World University Futsal Championships in Almaty
  - In the final, Russia defeated Kazakhstan, 4–2. Ukraine took third place and Portugal took fourth place.

== Deaths ==
=== January ===
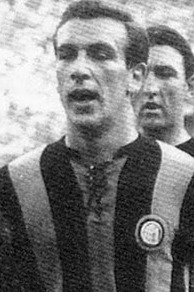
Antonio Valentín Angelillo

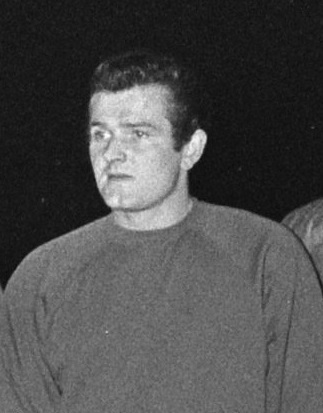
Tommy Lawrence

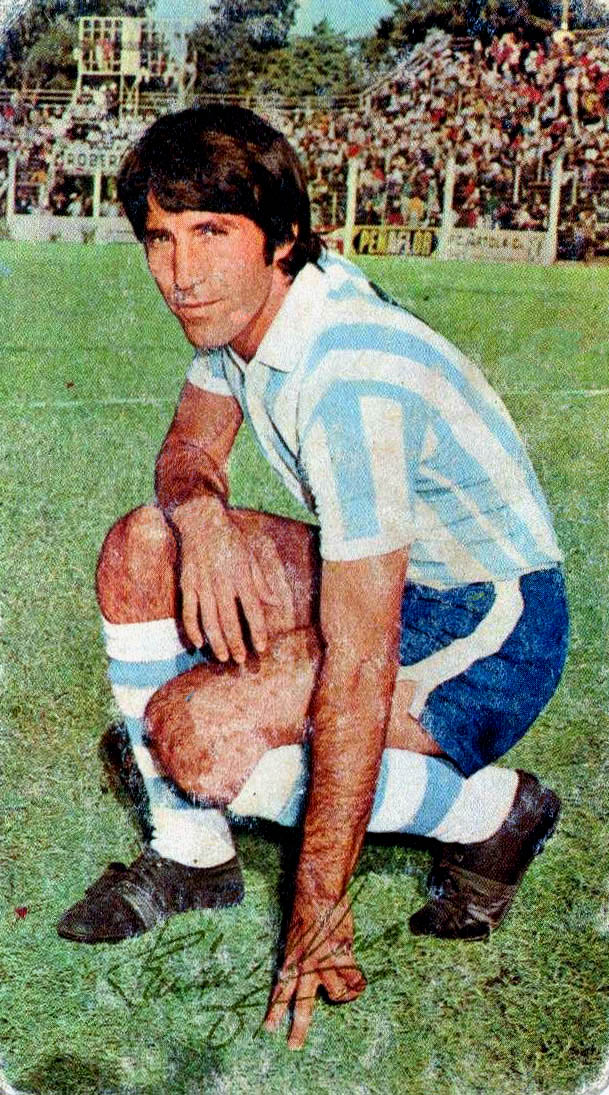
Rubén Oswaldo Díaz

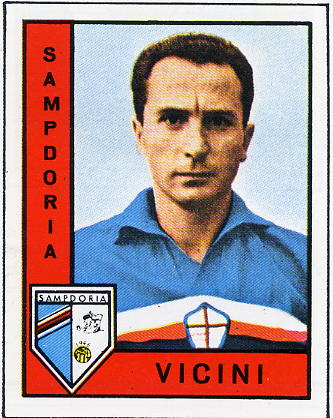
Azeglio Vicini

- 1 January
  - Gert Brauer, 62, German footballer
  - Régis Manon, 52, Gabonese footballer
  - Dušan Mitošević, 68, Serbian football player
- 2 January
  - Alan Deakin, 76, English footballer
  - Eugène Gerards, 77, Dutch football player
  - Ali Kadhim, 69, Iraqi football player
  - Mike McCartney, 63, Scottish footballer
  - Michael Pfeiffer, 92, German football player
  - Felix Reilly, 84, Scottish footballer
- 3 January
  - Darci Miguel Monteiro, 49, Brazilian footballer
  - Igor Strelbin, 43, Russian footballer
- 4 January
  - Peter Birdseye, 98, English footballer
  - Papa Camara, 66, Guinean football player
  - Joaquín Cortizo, 85, Spanish footballer
- 5 January – Antonio Valentín Angelillo, 80, Italian-Argentine football player
- 6 January – Nigel Sims, 86, English footballer
- 8 January
  - Hans Aabech, 69, Danish footballer
  - Juan Carlos García, 29, Honduran footballer
  - Antonio Munguía, 75, Mexican footballer
- 9 January
  - Tommy Lawrence, 77, Scottish footballer
  - Valeri Matyunin, 57, Russian footballer
  - Ted Phillips, 84, English footballer
  - Kurt Thalmann, 86, Swiss footballer
- 10 January
  - Pierre Grillet, 85, French footballer
  - John McGlashan, 50, Scottish footballer
  - Gordon Wills, 83, English footballer
- 11 January
  - Raúl Antonio García, 55, Salvadoran footballer
  - Takis Loukanidis, 80, Greek footballer
  - Giuseppe Secchi, 86, Italian footballer
- 12 January – Léon Ritzen (nl), 78, Belgian footballer
- 13 January – Mohammed Hazzaz, 72, Moroccan footballer
- 14 January
  - Anton Regh, 77, German footballer
  - Cyrille Regis, 59, English footballer
- 15 January
  - Carl Emil Christiansen, 80, Danish footballer
  - Bogusław Cygan, 53, Polish footballer
- 16 January
  - Rubén Oswaldo Díaz, 72, Argentine footballer
  - Rodney Fern, 69, English footballer
- 19 January – Abdulsalam Musa, 39, Nigerian footballer
- 21 January
  - Philippe Gondet, 75, French footballer
  - Tsukasa Hosaka, 80, Japanese footballer
- 22 January
  - Jimmy Armfield, 82, English football player
  - Reinier Kreijermaat, 82, Dutch footballer
- 25 January – Keith Pring, 74, Welsh footballer
- 27 January – Göran Nicklasson, 75, Swedish footballer
- 30 January
  - Vic Keeble, 87, English footballer
  - Azeglio Vicini, 84, Italian football player and National Team coach
- 31 January – Hennie Hollink, 86, Dutch footballer

=== February ===
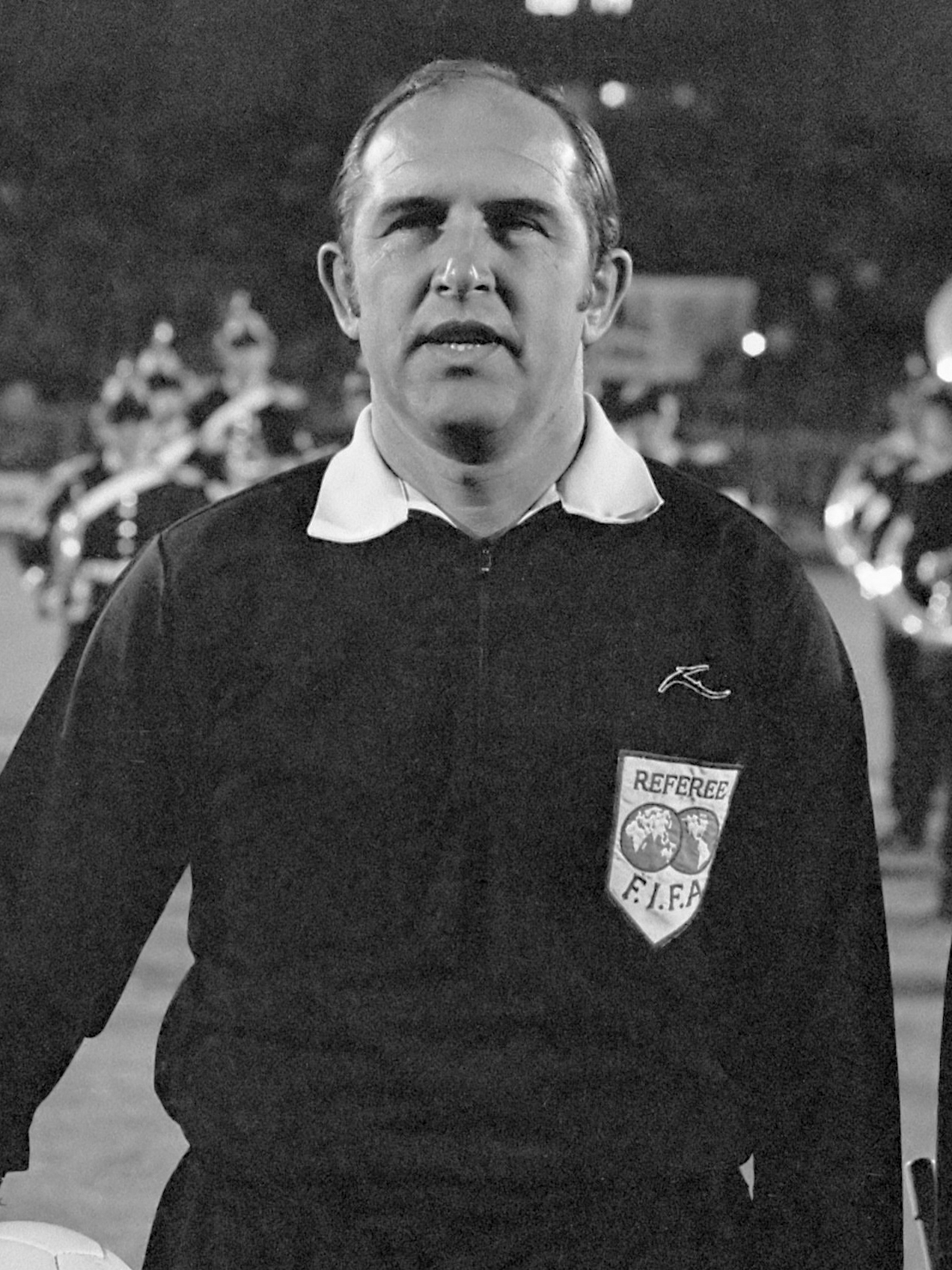
Károly Palotai

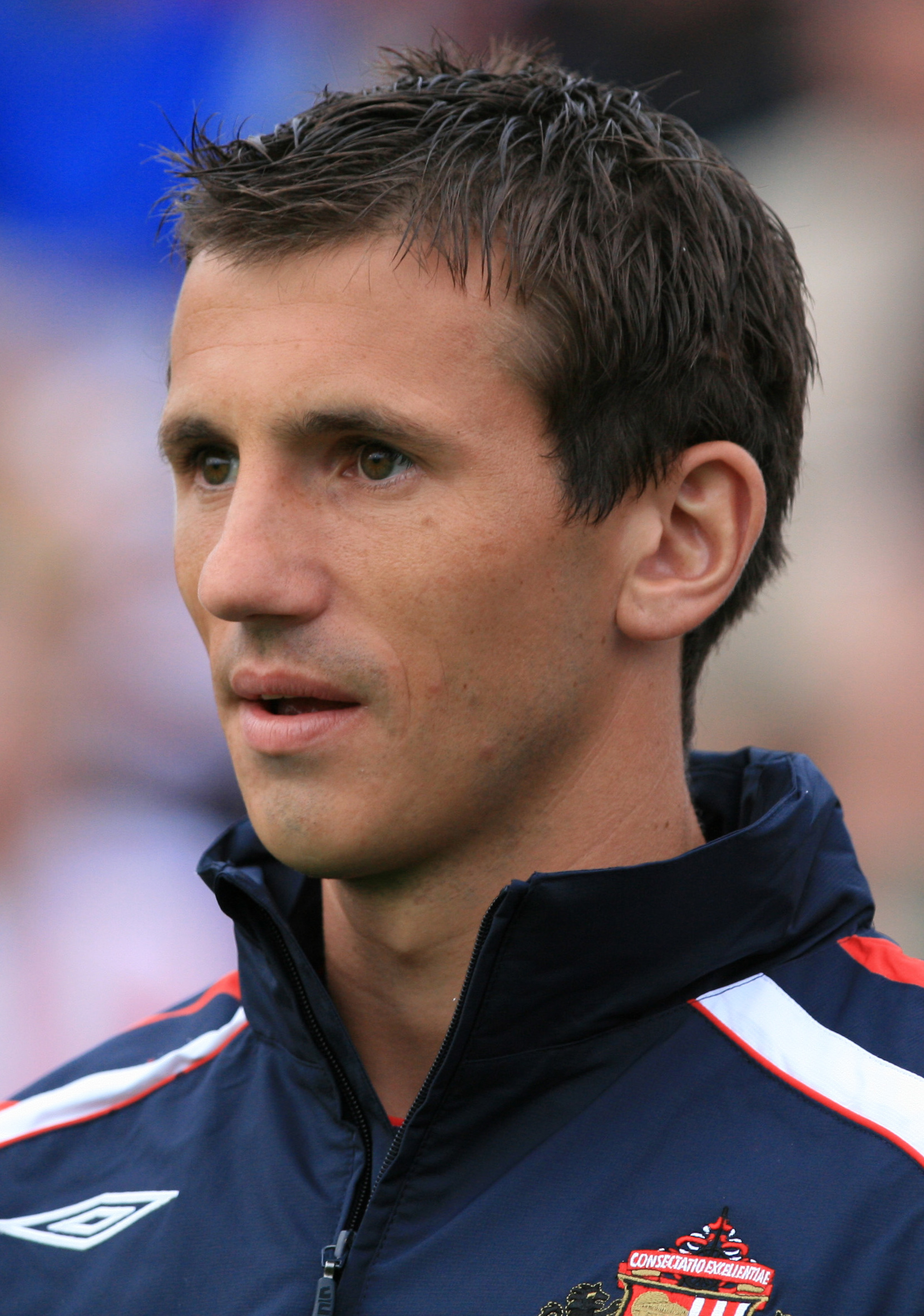
Liam Miller

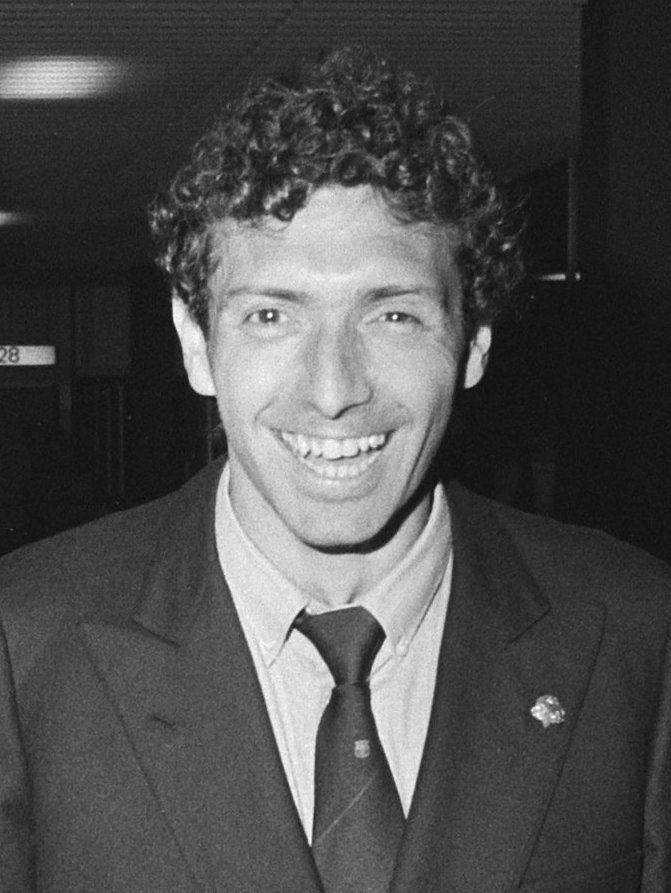
Quini

- 2 February
  - Paulo Roberto Morais Júnior, 33, Brazilian footballer
  - Fábio Pereira de Azevedo, 41, Brazilian-born Togolese footballer
- 3 February – Károly Palotai, 82, Hungarian football player and referee
- 4 February – Majid Ariff, 80, Singaporean football player and coach
- 5 February – Ladislav Kačáni, 86, Slovak football player and coach
- 9 February – Liam Miller, 36, Irish footballer
- 10 February – Dick Scott, 76, English footballer
- 12 February – Mogau Tshehla, 26, South African footballer
- 13 February
  - Joseph Bonnel, 79, French footballer
  - Danilo Caçador, 32, Brazilian footballer
  - Luis Cid, 88, Spanish football coach
- 16 February
  - Hans Rinner, 54, Austrian businessman and football official
  - Muhammet Yürükuslu, 26, Turkish footballer
- 17 February – Peder Persson, 79, Swedish footballer
- 18 February
  - Pavel Panov, 67, Bulgarian football player and coach
  - Chinedu Udoji, 28, Nigerian footballer
- 20 February
  - Lucien Bouchardeau, 56, Nigerien football referee
  - Georgi Markov, 46, Bulgarian footballer
- 21 February
  - Sergei Aleksandrov, 44, Russian footballer
  - Chow Chee Keong, 69, Malaysian footballer
- 22 February
  - Bence Lázár, 26, Hungarian footballer
  - Billy Wilson, 71, English footballer
- 25 February
  - Branko Kubala, 69, Czechoslovak-born Spanish footballer
  - Henri Leonetti, 81, French footballer
  - Tsvetan Veselinov, 70, Bulgarian footballer
- 27 February – Quini (Enrique Castro González), 68, Spanish footballer
- 28 February
  - Kieron Durkan, 44, English footballer
  - John Muir, 70, Scottish footballer

=== March ===
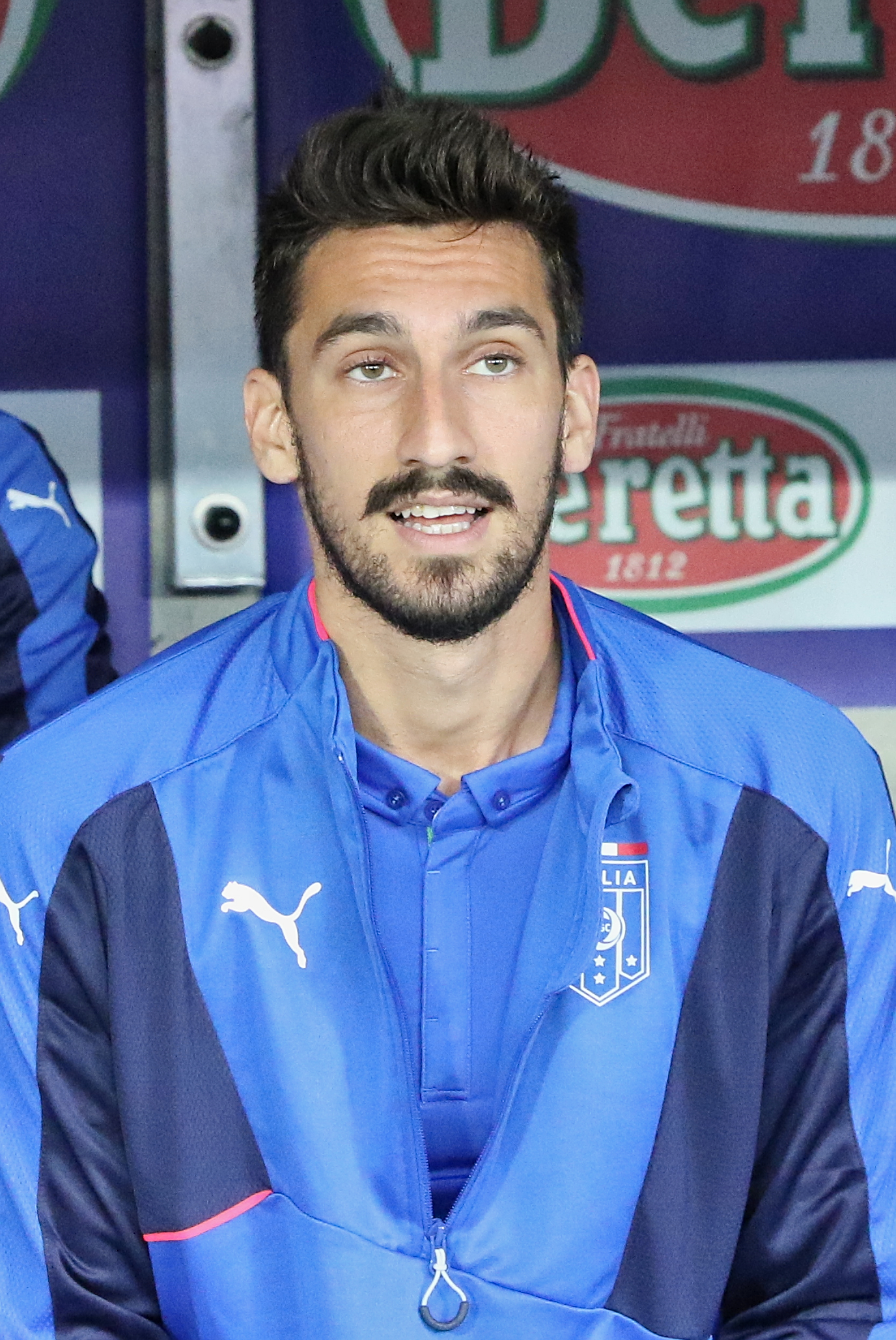
Davide Astori

- 1 March – Vicente Piquer, 83, Spanish footballer and coach
- 3 March – Arthur Stewart, 76, Northern Irish footballer
- 4 March – Davide Astori, 31, Italian footballer
- 5 March
  - Shaker Al-Olayan, 46, Saudi Arabian footballer
  - Costakis Koutsokoumnis, 61, Cypriot football administrator
- 6 March
  - Francis Piasecki, 66, French footballer
  - Vitaliy Zub, 89, Ukrainian footballer
- 7 March – John Molyneux, 87, English football player
- 9 March – Ion Voinescu, 88, Romanian footballer
- 14 March – Rubén Galván 65, Argentine football player
- 16 March
  - Boyukagha Hajiyev, 59, Azerbaijani footballer and manager
  - Ezequiel Orozco, 29, Mexican footballer
  - Adrian Lillebekk Ovlien, 20, Norwegian footballer
- 22 March – René Houseman, 64, Argentine footballer

=== April ===
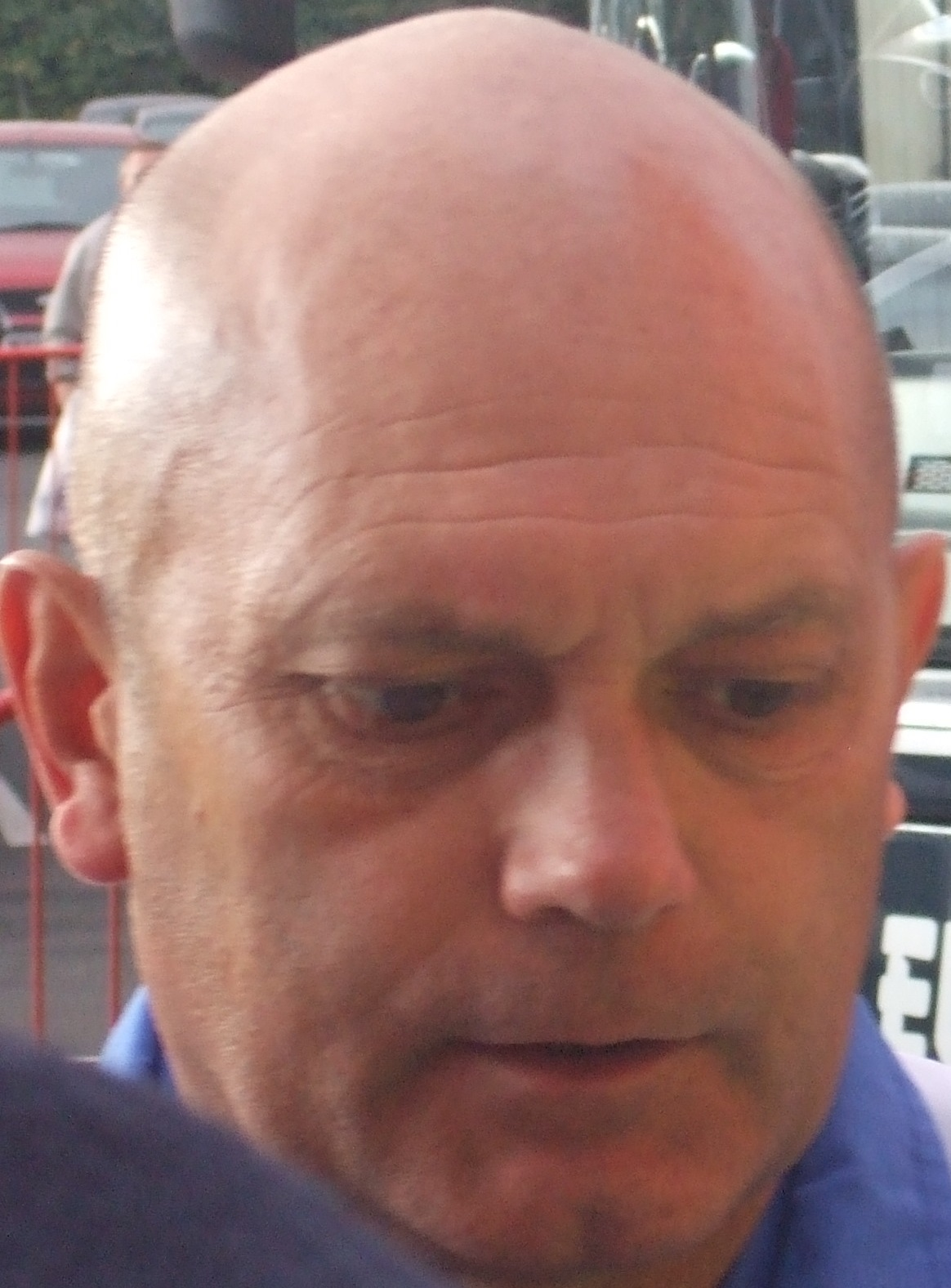
Ray Wilkins

- 2 April
  - Elie Onana, 66, Cameroonian footballer
  - Paul Sinibaldi, 96, French footballer
- 4 April – Ray Wilkins, 61, English football player, heart attack
- 8 April
  - António Barros, 68, Portuguese footballer
  - André Lerond, 87, French footballer
- 13 April – Cesarino Cervellati, 88, Italian football player and manager

=== May ===
- 15 May – Jlloyd Samuel, 37, English-Trinidadian footballer
- 18 May – Doğan Babacan, 88, Turkish referee

=== June ===
- 18 June – Walter Bahr, 91, American soccer player

=== July ===
- 8 July – Alan Gilzean, 79, Scottish footballer
- 14 July – Davie McParland, 83, Scottish footballer and manager
- 21 July – Allan Ball, 75, English footballer

=== September ===
- 24 September – Jim Brogan, 74, Scottish footballer

=== October ===
- 15 October – Fernando Serena, 77, Spanish footballer
- 18 October – Darren Stewart, 52, Australian soccer player and manager
- 21 October – Ilie Balaci, 62, Romanian footballer and manager
- 27 October – Vichai Srivaddhanaprabha, 60, Thai businessman and owner of Leicester City F.C., helicopter crash
- 31 October – Johnny Graham, 73, Scottish footballer.

=== November ===
- 13 November
  - William Mullan, 90, Scottish football referee.
  - David Stewart, 71, Scottish footballer.
- 16 November – Flemming Nielsen, 84, Danish footballer
- 19 November – George Yardley, 76, Scottish footballer
- 22 November – Len Campbell, 71, Scottish footballer

=== December ===
- 25 December – Sigi Schmid, 65, American soccer coach
- 27 December – Juan Bautista Agüero, 83, Paraguayan footballer
