= Rodondo Roach =

Anguillan footballer

Personal information
- Full name: Rodondo Alphonso Roach
- Date of birth: 27 October 2002 (age 24)
- Place of birth: The Valley, Anguilla
- Position: Defender

Team information
- Current team: Diamond FC

Youth career
- 2015–2018: ALHCS Spartan FC

Senior career*
Years	Team	Apps	(Gls)
2019–	Diamond FC		
2019	→ 1. FCA Darmstadt (loan)		

International career^{‡}
2019	Anguilla U17	1	(0)
2021–	Anguilla	1	(0)
- * Club domestic league appearances and goals as of 18:43, 24 January 2022 (UTC) ‡ National team caps and goals as of 18:43, 24 January 2022 (UTC)

Rodondo Roach (born 27 October 2002) is an Anguillan association footballer who currently plays for Diamond FC of the AFA Senior Male League, and the Anguilla national team.

== Club career ==
Roach began playing competitive football in 2015. In 2018 he won Anguilla's local Flow Skills Competition and was the island's male representative in the final competition held in Port of Spain, Trinidad and Tobago that year. In October 2019 Roach and fellow Anguillan Raymel Niles joined the under-19 team of 1. FCA Darmstadt of the German seventh division on loan from Diamond FC. The short-term loan ended in December 2019 and the two players arrived home ahead of the 2020 AFA Senior Male League.

== International career ==
In 2019 Roach made one appearance for Anguilla in 2019 CONCACAF U-17 Championship qualifying. He made his senior international debut on 5 June 2021 in a 2022 FIFA World Cup qualification match against Panama.

=== International career statistics ===
As of match played 5 June 2021.

Anguilla national team
Year	Apps	Goals
2021	1	0
Total	1	0
