= Hans Rinner =

Austrian businessman and football administrator (1963–2018)

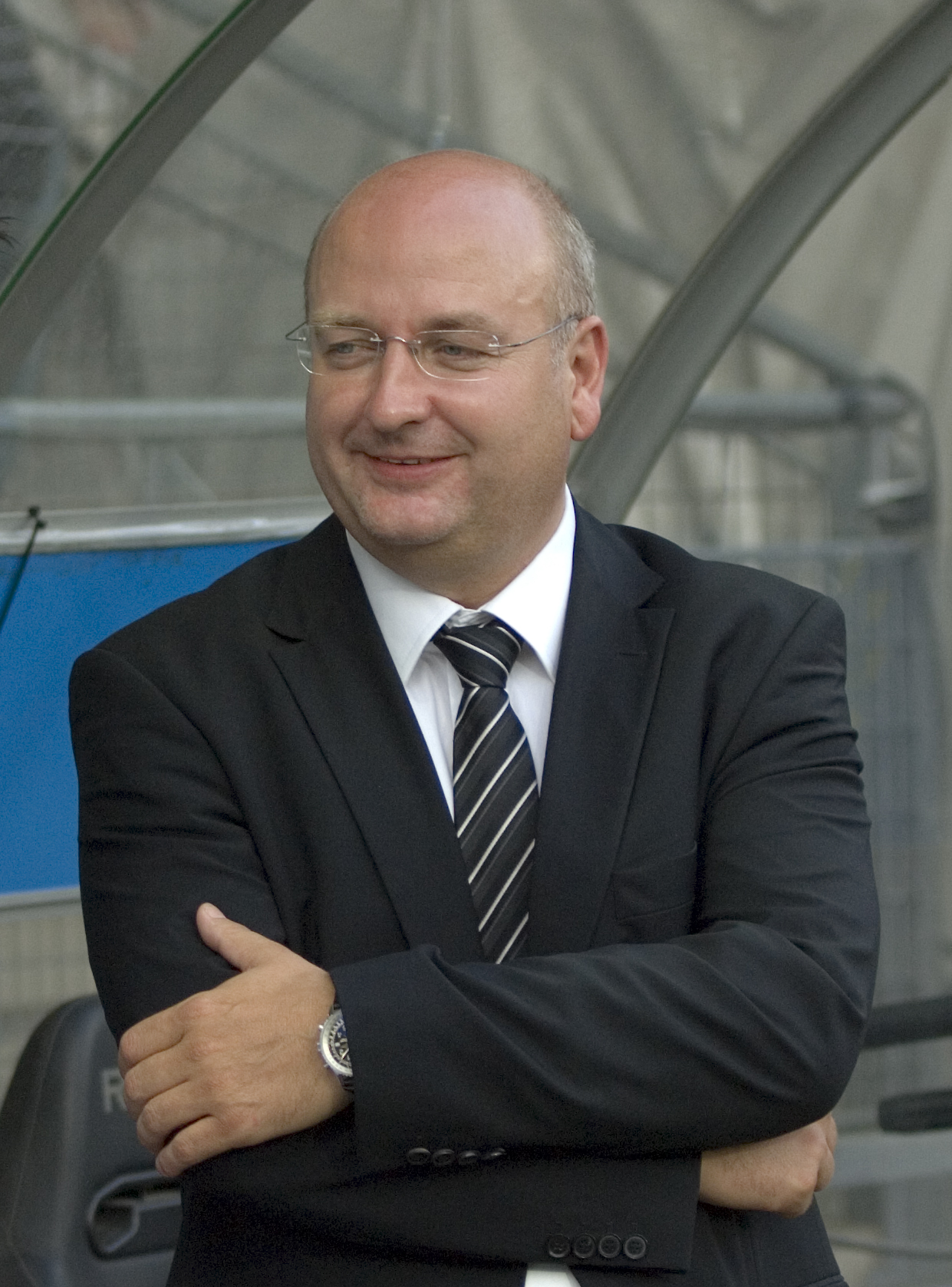
- Born: 18 March 1963; Semriach, Austria
- Died: 16 February 2018 (aged 54)
- Occupation: Businessman
- Title: President of the Austrian Football Bundesliga
- Term: 2009–2018
- Predecessor: Martin Pucher

Hans Rinner (18 March 1963 – 16 February 2018) was an Austrian businessman and football administrator. Since 7 December 2009 he was the President of the Austrian Football Bundesliga. Rinner was also the owner and manager of a refrigeration company. From 2007 to 2010 he was president of SK Sturm Graz and then until 2016, member of the Supervisory Board. Since 2016 he was honorary president of the club.

== Biography ==
After school Rinner completed an apprenticeship as an electrician. He then completed his high school diploma at night school, specializing in the field of refrigeration. Rinner was managing director of his company in Frauental an der Laßnitz.

=== Football ===
Rinner was elected on 2 November 2006 as vice president of the football club SK Sturm Graz. On 18 January 2007 he was elected president of the club. He was the successor of Hans Fedl. During his tenure, the club was able to complete a bankruptcy procedure successfully. On 25 May 2010, Rinner stepped down as President during a board meeting.

Since 2006, Rinner was also vice president of the Austrian Bundesliga, which includes the Bundesliga and First League. On 27 November 2009, the club heads of the Bundesliga agreed on Rinner becoming the new Bundesliga president. He was the successor of Martin Pucher. The official election took place on 7 December 2009, and as expected, the choice of Hans Rinner won with 75 of 80 votes.

At the General Assembly of the SK Sturm Graz on 18 January 2016, Rinner was appointed honorary president of the club. He died on 16 February 2018 of cancer.
