= AFA Senior Male League =

Anguillan association football league

- Organising body: Anguilla Football Association
- Founded: 1997
- First season: 1997–98
- Country: Anguilla
- Confederation: CONCACAF
- Number of clubs: 10
- Level on pyramid: 1
- Domestic cup: AFA President's Cup
- International cup: CFU Club Shield
- Current champions: Attackers FC (2026)
- Most championships: Roaring Lions FC (11 titles)
- Top scorer: Jonathan Guishard (88 goals)
- Current: 2026 AFA Senior Male League

AFA Senior Male League, also known as AFA Anguilla Football League, is an association football league and the highest level in Anguilla. Founded in 1997, the league is contested by ten participating clubs. The Raymond E. Guishard Technical Centre is the venue used for matches.

== Participating clubs ==
- ALHCS Spartan FC
- Attackers FC
- Diamond FC
- Doc's United FC
- Eagle Claw FC
- East Enders FC
- Lymers FC
- Roaring Lions FC
- Uprising FC
- West End Predators

== Champions ==
Ed.	Season	Champions
1	1997–98	ALHCS Spartan
2	1998–99	Attackers
–	1999–00	The league was not held due to Hurricane Lenny
3	2000–01	Roaring Lions
4	2001–02	Roaring Lions
5	2002–03	Roaring Lions
6	2004	ALHCS Spartan
7	2005–06	Roaring Lions
8	2006–07	Kicks United
9	2007–08	Attackers
10	2008–09	Attackers
11	2009–10	Roaring Lions
12	2010–11	Kicks United
13	2011–12	Kicks United
14	2012–13	Attackers
15	2013–14	Roaring Lions
16	2014–15	Kicks United
17	2015–16	Salsa Ballers
18	2016–17	Roaring Lions
19	2018	Kicks United
20	2019	Kicks United
21	2020	Roaring Lions
22	2021	Roaring Lions
23	2022	Roaring Lions
24	2023	Doc's United
25	2024	Doc's United
26	2025	Roaring Lions
27	2026	Attackers

== Performances ==
Rank	Club	Titles	Winning seasons
1	Roaring Lions FC	11	2000–01, 2001–02, 2002–03, 2005–06, 2009–10, 2013–14, 2016–17, 2020, 2021, 2022, 2025
2	Kicks United FC	6	2006–07, 2010–11, 2011–12, 2014–15, 2018, 2019
3	Attackers FC	5	1998–99, 2007–08, 2008–09, 2012–13, 2026
4	ALHCS Spartan FC	2	1997–98, 2004
5	Salsa Ballers FC	1	2015–16
5	Doc's United FC	1	2023

== Player records ==
=== Top goalscorers ===
Season	Player	Team	Goals
2020	(Jamaica) Oliver Walker		18
2021	(Anguilla) Jonathan Guishard [es]	Doc's United	10
2022	(Trinidad and Tobago) Ricardo John	Salsa Ballers	25
2023	(Anguilla) Jonathan Guishard	Doc's United	30
2024	(Anguilla) Jauron Gayle	Uprising	21
2025	(Anguilla) Germain Hughes	Roaring Lions	23

Most goals by a player in a single season

- 30 goals.
  - Jonathan Guishard (2023).

=== Multiple hat-tricks ===
Rank	Country	Player	Hat-tricks
1	(Anguilla)	Jonathan Guishard	11
2	(Cuba)	Jose Torres	6
3	(Saint Vincent and the Grenadines)	Chavel Cunningham	2
3	(Saint Vincent and the Grenadines)	Sylvanus James	2
3	(Anguilla)	Stewart Murray	2
6	(Anguilla)	Glenville Allen	1
6	(Anguilla)	Mekhi Connor	1
6	(Anguilla)	Jauron Gayle	1
6	(Anguilla)	Germain Hughes	1
6	(Anguilla)	Steve Lawrence	1
6	(Anguilla)	Cardinaé Rennie	1
6	(Jamaica)	Jermaine Ricketts	1

== Women's League ==
=== Top goalscorers ===
Season	Player	Team	Goals
2023	(Anguilla) Carlia Johnson	Superstars	42
2024	(Anguilla) Carlia Johnson	Superstars	29
2025	(Anguilla) Carlia Johnson	Superstars	23

All-time goalscorers

- 94 goals.
  - Carlia Johnson
