= George Hill, Anguilla =

George Hill
- District
- Location within Anguilla
- Coordinates: 18.19919°N 63.06856°W
- Country: United Kingdom
- Overseas Territory: Anguilla

Area
  - Land: 2.31 sq mi (5.98 km^{2})

Population (2011)
  - Total: 879

George Hill is one of the fourteen Districts of Anguilla. Its population at the 2011 census was 879.

== Demographics ==
Historical population

Year	Pop.	±%
1974	304	—
1984	492	+61.8%
1994	635	+29.1%

Year	Pop.	±%
2001	791	+24.6%
2011	879	+11.1%

Source: Statoids.com
