= West End, Anguilla =

West End
- District
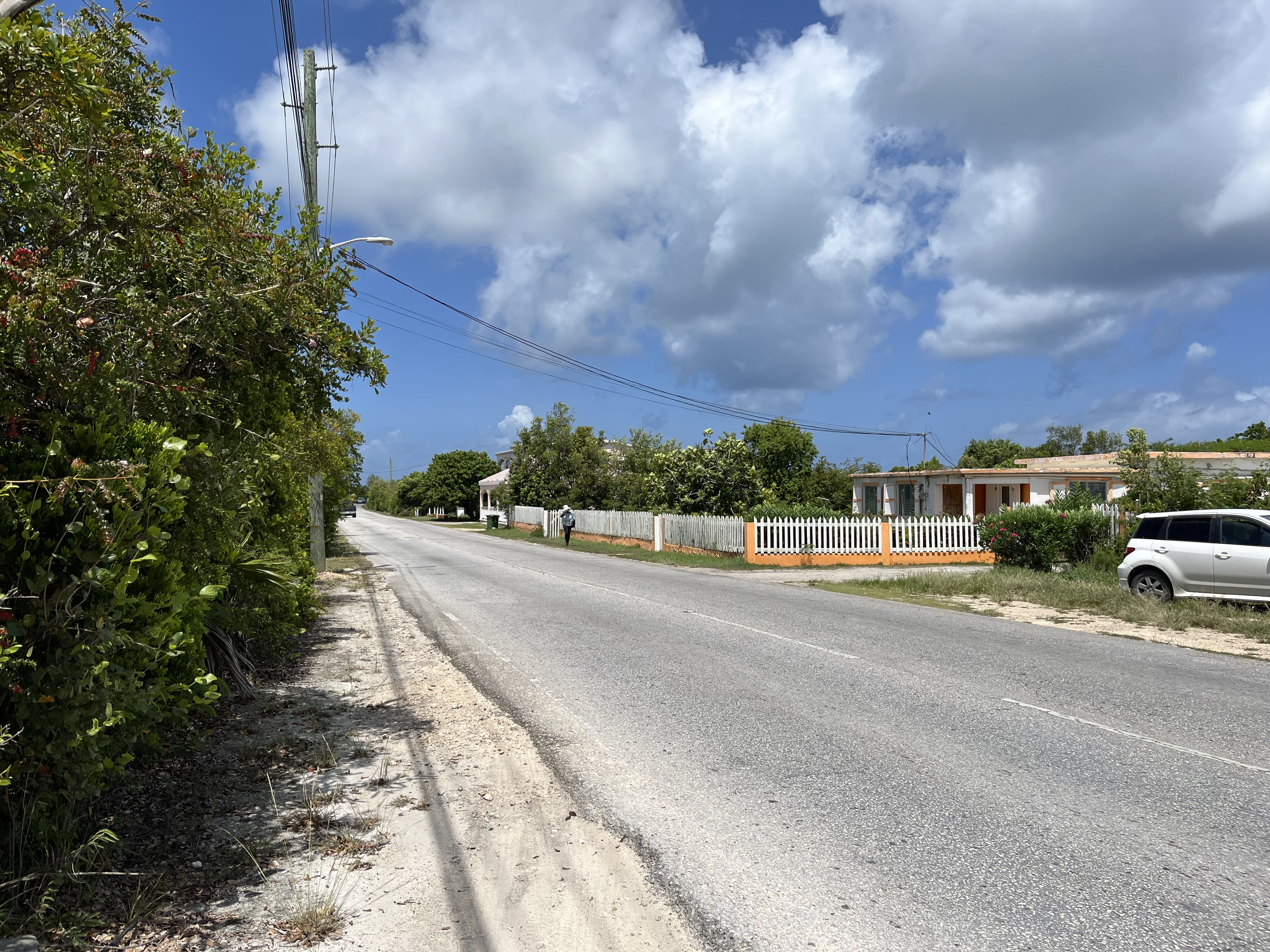

- Location within Anguilla
- Coordinates: 18.17162°N 63.15010°W
- Country: United Kingdom
- Overseas Territory: Anguilla

Area
  - Land: 3.12 sq mi (8.07 km^{2})

Population (2011)
  - Total: 813

West End is one of the fourteen Districts of Anguilla. Its population at the 2011 census was 813.

== Education ==
There is one government school in the town, Alwyn Allison Primary School. Albena Lake-Hodge Comprehensive School in The Valley serves secondary students.

== Demographics ==
Historical population

| Year | Pop. | ±% |
|---|---|---|
| 1974 | 479 | — |
| 1984 | 402 | −16.1% |
| 1994 | 611 | +52.0% |

| Year | Pop. | ±% |
|---|---|---|
| 2001 | 736 | +20.5% |
| 2011 | 813 | +10.5% |

Source: Statoids.com
