= Doc's United FC =

Association football club in Anguilla

- Full name: Doc's United Football Club
- Nickname: United
- Founded: 27 January 2007; 19 years ago
- Ground: Raymond E. Guishard Technical Centre, The Valley
- Capacity: 1,100
- League: AFA Senior Male League
- 2026: 3rd
Home colours	Away colours

Doc's United FC is an Anguillan professional football club based in Stoney Ground that competes in the AFA Senior League, the top tier of Anguillian football. The club was founded in 2007.

Doc's United are the most recent Anguillan league champions, winning the 2023 edition of the AFA Senior Male League.

== Honours ==
- AFA Senior Male League: 2

2023, 2024
