= Football in Anguilla =

The sport of association football in the island of Anguilla is run by the Anguilla Football Association since their foundation in 1990. The association administers the Anguillian national football teams (men's and women's), as well as the leagues (men/women).

== History ==
The football association was founded in 1990, but the earliest days of football came with British soldiers in 1969. Football will have been limited in scale by the lack of organisational structure across the period, but it remained a popular sport on the island. They would be admitted to FIFA and CONCACAF in 1996, opening up further opportunities for footballers from the island. There is evidence of the men's league as early as 1997, though with the national team playing in qualifiers for the 1990 Caribbean Cup, it seems likely that an informal league was in place before then. Youth national teams have played at all levels.

While men's football had largely been the focus, women's football started to develop in the early 2000's, with the first registered players coming through in 2003, expanding up to a 5-team league by 2006. The women's national team and national league both formed in that period, with unofficial internationals and the earliest days of the league in 2003. A full sized league and fully recognised internationals would follow in 2004. Youth national matches would also occur across this period. Aside from a gap in international matches due to Chikungunya virus, both continue to this day.

== Controversies ==
In 2012, Raymond Guishard, president of the Anguilla Football Association, was suspended by FIFA from all activity related to football for 45 days. This was because of his involvement in the Caribbean Football Union corruption scandal the year prior. At the same time, disputes were ongoing between the AFA and several clubs over youth development programs and overseas recruiting. As such, Guishard did not explain his suspension to the AFA, nor did the clubs have any information on the AFA's financial reports for the last several years. Unbeknownst to them, the AFA had received upwards of $3.5 million USD in funds from FIFA between 2000 and 2010, yet only managed to play 17 international games, making it one of the most inactive teams in the world.

In 2015, Anguilla finally played its first full international game on the island, even though a $700,000 stadium had been built more than five years prior with money from international grants.

== League system ==
Level	League(s)/Division(s)
1	AFA Senior Male League; 11 clubs

Level	League(s)/Division(s)
1	AFA Senior Female League; 7 clubs

== Football stadiums in Anguilla ==
Stadium	Capacity	City
Ronald Webster Park	4,000	The Valley
Raymond E. Guishard Technical Centre	1,000	The Valley
