= Salsa Ballers FC =

Association football club in Anguilla

Salsa Ballers
- League: AFA Senior Male League
Home colours	Away colours

Salsa Ballers FC is a professional Anguillan football club based in George Hill, that competes in the AFA Senior Male League, the top tier of Anguillan football.
