= Kicks United FC =

Association football club in Anguilla

Kicks United F.C.
- Full name: Kicks United Football Club
- Founded: 7 September 2005; 19 years ago
- Ground: Ronald Webster Park, The Valley
- Capacity: 4,000
- League: Anguillan League

Kicks United Football Club is a professional football club based in The Valley, Anguilla. It competes in the AFA Senior Male League, the top flight of Anguillan football.

== History ==
Winning the treble- the league, the League Cup, and the Knockout Cup in 2014–15, Kicks United unilaterally decided to withdraw from the 2015–16 season in protest with the Anguilla Football Association's constant refusal to recognize their application for club membership.
