= Attackers FC =

Association football club in Anguilla

- Full name: Sunset Homes Attackers FC
- Nickname: Attackers
- Ground: Raymond E. Guishard Technical Centre, The Valley
- Capacity: 1,100
- League: Anguillan League
- 2026: 1st (Champions)
Home colours	Away colours

Attackers FC is an Anguillian professional football club based in The Valley-North.

In the 2012–13 season, the club won the AFA Senior League, the top tier of Anguillian football.

== Honours ==
- AFA President's Cup
  - Champions: 2026
- Anguillian League
  - Champions (4): 1998–99, 2007–08, 2008–09, 2012–13, 2026
