= Ronald Webster Park =

Sports venue in The Valley, Anguilla

Coordinates: 18°13′00.32″N 63°03′03.56″W

Ronald Webster Park is a sports venue in The Valley, Anguilla. It is currently used mostly for football matches, although most years the Leeward Islands cricket team play one of their matches in the Regional Four Day Competition on this ground, as well as local athletics clubs. The stadium holds 4,000.

== Overview ==
According to the March 2009 edition of The Wisden Cricketer magazine, the ground "is reputed to have the best pitch in the Caribbean for pace and even bounce. If the rumours are believed, it has something to do with meticulous rolling at night under the light of a full moon".

In 2026, an outdoor gym was opened at the venue.
