= Roaring Lions FC =

Association football club in Anguilla

Roaring Lions
- Full name: Roaring Lions FC
- Nickname: Lions
- Founded: 1981; 45 years ago
- Ground: Raymond E. Guishard Technical Centre, The Valley
- Capacity: 1,100
- League: Anguillan League
- 2026: 32nd
Home colours	Away colours

Roaring Lions is an Anguillian professional football club based in Stoney Ground that competes in the AFA Senior League, the top tier of Anguillian football. Roaring Lions FC have the most titles in Anguilla.

== Honours ==
- Anguillian League
  - Champions (11): 2000–01, 2001–02, 2002–03, 2005–06, 2009–10, 2013–14, 2016–17, 2020, 2021, 2022, 2025
