= ALHCS Spartan FC =

Association football club in Anguilla

Spartans Football Club
- Full name: Spartans Football Club
- Nickname: Spartans FC
- Ground: Raymond E. Guishard Technical Centre
- Chairman: Riorita Warner-Browne
- Manager: Cheidyn Bryan
- League: AFA Senior Male League
- 2026: 6th
Home colours	Away colours

Spartans Football Club is an Anguillan football academy based at the Albena Lake-Hodge Comprehensive School in The Valley. The team finished fourth in the AFA Senior Male League during the 2015–16 season.
