= Diamond FC =

Association football club in Anguilla

Diamond
- Full name: Diamond Football Club
- Founded: 2014
- Ground: Raymond E. Guishard Technical Centre
- Capacity: 1,100
- League: AFA Senior Male League
- 2026: 7th
- Website: https://www.diamond-fc.com/
Home colours	Away colours

Diamond FC is an Anguillan professional football club based in The Valley. The team finished as runners-up in the AFA Senior Male League during the 2015–16 season.
