= Raymond E. Guishard Technical Centre =

Stadium in The Valley, Anguilla

- The REGTC
- Interactive map of Raymond E. Guishard Technical Centre
- Full name: Raymond Gordon Ernest Guishard Technical Centre
- Coordinates: 18.2182°N 63.0500°W
- Capacity: 1,100

Construction
- Opened: 31 October 2005

The Raymond Gordon Ernest Guishard Technical Centre is an association football facility in Pope Hill, The Valley, Anguilla.

It has a capacity of 1,100.

In 2015, it hosted Group 1 in the 2015 Caribbean Football Union Boys’ U-15 Championship and in 2016, the venue hosted the senior Anguilla national football team match against Puerto Rico in the 2017 Caribbean Cup qualification campaign.
