= 2026 FIFA World Cup qualification – CONCACAF second round =

International football competition

Tournament details
- Dates: 5 June 2024 – 10 June 2025
- Teams: 30 (from 1 confederation)

Tournament statistics
- Matches played: 59
- Goals scored: 216 (3.66 per match)
- Attendance: 285,997 (4,847 per match)
- Top scorer(s): (Curaçao) Gervane Kastaneer (Saint Vincent and the Grenadines) Oalex Anderson (5 goals each)

The second round of CONCACAF matches of 2026 FIFA World Cup qualification took place during the months of June 2024 and June 2025.

== Format ==
As Canada, Mexico, and the United States qualified for the final tournament as hosts, they did not take part in the qualification tournament. Thirty teams – the top twenty-eight from the December 2023 FIFA World Ranking and the two first round winners – were drawn into six groups of five teams each, and each team played each other team in their group once with two home matches and two away matches (one-off matches each). The winners and runners-up from each group advanced to the third round.

== Seeding ==
The draw took place on 25 January 2024 in Zürich, Switzerland. Teams were seeded based on the FIFA Men's World Ranking of December 2023 (shown in parentheses).

From the December 2023 FIFA Men's World Ranking
| Pot 1 | Pot 2 | Pot 3 |
|---|---|---|
| **Panama** (41); **Costa Rica** (52); **Jamaica** (55); **Honduras** (76); **El Salvador** (78); **Haiti** (89) | **Curaçao** (90); **Trinidad and Tobago** (96); **Guatemala** (108); **Nicaragua** (134); Antigua and Barbuda (142); **Suriname** (143) | Saint Kitts and Nevis (147); Dominican Republic (151); Guyana (157); Puerto Rico (160); Saint Lucia (167); Cuba (169) |
| Pot 4 | Pot 5 | |
| **Bermuda** (171); Saint Vincent and the Grenadines (173); Grenada (174); Montserrat (176); Barbados (178); Dominica (180) | Belize (182); Aruba (193); Cayman Islands (197); Bahamas (202); British Virgin Islands (207) (Note: Winners of the first round, whose identities were not known at the time of the draw); Anguilla (209) | |

Note: Bold indicates team advancing to the third round.

== Schedule ==
The fixtures were predetermined based on the pots that the teams were drawn from. CONCACAF confirmed the match dates on 29 January 2024, with fixtures to be played from 5–11 June 2024 and 4–10 June 2025.

| Match | Date |
|---|---|
| 2 v 4 | 5 June 2024 |
| 1 v 3 | 6 June 2024 |
| 5 v 2 | 8 June 2024 |
| 4 v 1 | 9 June 2024 |
| 3 v 5 | 11 June 2024 |
| 4 v 5 | 4 June 2025 |
| 2 v 3 | 6 June 2025 |
| 5 v 1 | 7 June 2025 |
| 3 v 4 | 10 June 2025 |
| 1 v 2 | 10 June 2025 |

== Groups ==
=== Group A ===
| Pos | Team | Pld | W | D | L | GF | GA | GD | Pts | Qualification | (Honduras) | (Bermuda) | (Cuba) | (Cayman Islands) | (Antigua and Barbuda) |
|---|---|---|---|---|---|---|---|---|---|---|---|---|---|---|---|
| 1 | Honduras | 4 | 4 | 0 | 0 | 12 | 2 | +10 | 12 | Advance to third round | — | — | 3–1 | — | 2–0 |
| 2 | Bermuda | 4 | 2 | 1 | 1 | 9 | 8 | +1 | 7 | Advance to third round | 1–6 | — | — | 5–0 | — |
| 3 | Cuba | 4 | 2 | 0 | 2 | 6 | 5 | +1 | 6 | | — | 1–2 | — | 3–0 (Note: Cuba were awarded a 3–0 victory by forfeit after Cayman Islands were prevented from traveling to Cuba by visa issues stemming from the United States government's restrictions on travel to Cuba.) | — |
| 4 | Cayman Islands | 4 | 1 | 0 | 3 | 1 | 9 | −8 | 3 | | 0–1 | — | — | — | 1–0 |
| 5 | Antigua and Barbuda | 4 | 0 | 1 | 3 | 1 | 5 | −4 | 1 | | — | 1–1 | 0–1 | — | — |

Source: FIFA
Rules for classification: Tiebreakers
Notes:
5 June 2024
15:00 UTC−4

| Antigua and Barbuda | 1–1 | Bermuda |
|---|---|---|
| Deterville 26' | Report (FIFA); Report (CONCACAF) | Ming 90' |

ABFA Technical Centre, Piggotts
Attendance: 404
Referee: Adonis Carrasco (Dominican Republic)
6 June 2024
18:30 UTC−6

| Honduras | 3–1 | Cuba |
|---|---|---|
| Lozano 26'; Rodríguez 45+2'; Castillo 82' | Report (FIFA); Report (CONCACAF) | Reyes 23' |

Estadio Nacional Chelato Uclés, Tegucigalpa
Attendance: 10,111
Referee: Juan Gabriel Calderón (Costa Rica)

8 June 2024
21:00 UTC−5 (Note: Postponed from originally scheduled start time of 15:30 UTC−5.)

| Cayman Islands | 1–0 | Antigua and Barbuda |
|---|---|---|
| Campbell 90+1' | Report (FIFA); Report (CONCACAF) |

Truman Bodden Sports Complex, George Town
Attendance: 637
Referee: Pierre-Luc Lauzière (Canada)
9 June 2024
20:00 UTC−3

| Bermuda | 1–6 | Honduras |
|---|---|---|
| Lewis 45+4' | Report (FIFA); Report (CONCACAF) | Arriaga 15'; Ruiz 49'; Rodríguez 53'; L. Vega 57'; Najar 62'; Róchez 90+1' |

Bermuda National Stadium, Devonshire Parish
Attendance: 1,021
Referee: Karen Hernández (Mexico)

11 June 2024
15:30 UTC−4

| Cuba | 3–0 Awarded (Note: Cuba were awarded a 3–0 victory by forfeit after Cayman Islands were prevented from traveling to Cuba by visa issues stemming from the United States government's restrictions on travel to Cuba.) | Cayman Islands |
|---|---|---|
| | Report (FIFA); Report (CONCACAF) |

Estadio Antonio Maceo, Santiago de Cuba
Referee: Fernando Morón (Panama)

4 June 2025
20:00 UTC−3

| Bermuda | 5–0 | Cayman Islands |
|---|---|---|
| Lewis 12' (pen.); Parfitt 54'; Hall 64'; Lambe 79'; Carpenter 84' | Report (FIFA); Report (CONCACAF) |

Bermuda National Stadium, Devonshire Parish
Referee: Rubiel Vazquez (United States)

6 June 2025
15:00 UTC−4

| Antigua and Barbuda | 0–1 | Cuba |
|---|---|---|
| | Report (FIFA); Report (CONCACAF) | Bravo 45+8' |

ABFA Technical Centre, Piggotts
Attendance: 428
Referee: Kwinsi Williams (Trinidad and Tobago)
7 June 2025
15:00 UTC−5

| Cayman Islands | 0–1 | Honduras |
|---|---|---|
| | Report (FIFA); Report (CONCACAF) | Robinson 86' (o.g.) |

Truman Bodden Sports Complex, George Town
Referee: Adonis Carrasco (Dominican Republic)

10 June 2025
16:00 UTC−4

| Cuba | 1–2 | Bermuda |
|---|---|---|
| Aguirre 58' | Report (FIFA); Report (CONCACAF) | Parfitt 6'; Lambe 74' |

Estadio Antonio Maceo, Santiago de Cuba
Attendance: 3,600
Referee: Oliver Vergara (Panama)
10 June 2025
20:00 UTC−6

| Honduras | 2–0 | Antigua and Barbuda |
|---|---|---|
| Montes 49'; A. Vega 80' | Report (FIFA); Report (CONCACAF) |

Estadio Nacional Chelato Uclés, Tegucigalpa
Attendance: 7,905
Referee: Waldir García (El Salvador)

=== Group B ===
| Pos | Team | Pld | W | D | L | GF | GA | GD | Pts | Qualification | (Costa Rica) | (Trinidad and Tobago) | (Grenada) | (Saint Kitts and Nevis) | (The Bahamas) |
|---|---|---|---|---|---|---|---|---|---|---|---|---|---|---|---|
| 1 | Costa Rica | 4 | 4 | 0 | 0 | 17 | 1 | +16 | 12 | Advance to third round | — | 2–1 | — | 4–0 | — |
| 2 | Trinidad and Tobago | 4 | 2 | 1 | 1 | 16 | 7 | +9 | 7 | Advance to third round | — | — | 2–2 | 6–2 | — |
| 3 | Grenada | 4 | 2 | 1 | 1 | 11 | 7 | +4 | 7 | | 0–3 | — | — | — | 6–0 |
| 4 | Saint Kitts and Nevis | 4 | 1 | 0 | 3 | 5 | 13 | −8 | 3 | | — | — | 2–3 | — | 1–0 |
| 5 | Bahamas | 4 | 0 | 0 | 4 | 1 | 22 | −21 | 0 | | 0–8 | 1–7 | — | — | — |

Source: FIFA
Rules for classification: Tiebreakers
5 June 2024
19:30 UTC−4

| Trinidad and Tobago | 2–2 | Grenada |
|---|---|---|
| Telfer 43'; Moore 74' | Report (FIFA); Report (CONCACAF) | Hippolyte 24' (pen.), 28' |

Hasely Crawford Stadium, Port of Spain
Attendance: 8,500
Referee: Mario Escobar (Guatemala)
6 June 2024
20:30 UTC−6

| Costa Rica | 4–0 | Saint Kitts and Nevis |
|---|---|---|
| Galo 40', 50'; Alcócer 83'; Rojas 84' | Report (FIFA); Report (CONCACAF) |

Estadio Nacional, San José
Attendance: 15,700
Referee: Julio Luna (Guatemala)

8 June 2024
17:30 UTC−4

| Bahamas | 1–7 | Trinidad and Tobago |
|---|---|---|
| Julmis 86' | Report (FIFA); Report (CONCACAF) | Shaw 6', 66'; Jones 14' (pen.); Muckette 43', 45+1'; Moore 56'; James 84' |

SKNFA Technical Center, Basseterre (Saint Kitts and Nevis)
Attendance: 165
Referee: Marco Ortíz (Mexico)
9 June 2024
17:00 UTC−4

| Grenada | 0–3 | Costa Rica |
|---|---|---|
| | Report (FIFA); Report (CONCACAF) | Ugalde 9'; Zamora 34'; Taylor 70' |

Kirani James Athletic Stadium, St. George's
Attendance: 2,780
Referee: Steffon Dewar (Jamaica)

11 June 2024
16:00 UTC−4

| Saint Kitts and Nevis | 1–0 | Bahamas |
|---|---|---|
| Bristow 12' | Report (FIFA); Report (CONCACAF) |

Warner Park, Basseterre
Attendance: 539
Referee: Walter López (Guatemala)

4 June 2025
19:00 UTC−4

| Grenada | 6–0 | Bahamas |
|---|---|---|
| Francis 15'; Johnson 36'; Francois 58'; Isaac 72'; Harrack 77'; Lewis 90' | Report (FIFA); Report (CONCACAF) |

Kirani James Athletic Stadium, St. George's
Attendance: 2,235
Referee: Shavin Greene (Guyana)

6 June 2025
19:30 UTC−4

| Trinidad and Tobago | 6–2 | Saint Kitts and Nevis |
|---|---|---|
| García 9'; Sealy 29', 66'; Molino 48' (pen.); Fortune 85'; James 89' | Report (FIFA); Report (CONCACAF) | Amory 27'; Williams 45' |

Hasely Crawford Stadium, Port of Spain
Attendance: 20,353
Referee: Natalie Simon (United States)
7 June 2025
19:00 UTC−4

| Bahamas | 0–8 | Costa Rica |
|---|---|---|
| | Report (FIFA); Report (CONCACAF) | Martínez 20'; J. Mora 37'; Bran 45+2'; Galo 48'; Ugalde 51'; Madrigal 64', 79'; Zamora 90' |

Wildey Turf, Wildey (Barbados)
Referee: Reon Radix (Grenada)

10 June 2025
15:00 UTC−4

| Saint Kitts and Nevis | 2–3 | Grenada |
|---|---|---|
| Simpson 34'; Sawyers 90+4' | Report (FIFA); Report (CONCACAF) | Charles-Cook 49'; Francis 76'; Johnson 90+1' |

Warner Park, Basseterre
Attendance: 700
Referee: Cristhofer Corado (Guatemala)
10 June 2025
19:00 UTC−6

| Costa Rica | 2–1 | Trinidad and Tobago |
|---|---|---|
| Mitchell 23'; Madrigal 38' | Report (FIFA); Report (CONCACAF) | L. García 58' |

Estadio Nacional, San José
Attendance: 17,000
Referee: Daniel Quintero (Mexico)

=== Group C ===
| Pos | Team | Pld | W | D | L | GF | GA | GD | Pts | Qualification | (Curaçao) | (Haiti) | (Saint Lucia) | (Aruba) | (Barbados) |
|---|---|---|---|---|---|---|---|---|---|---|---|---|---|---|---|
| 1 | Curaçao | 4 | 4 | 0 | 0 | 15 | 2 | +13 | 12 | Advance to third round | — | — | 4–0 | — | 4–1 |
| 2 | Haiti | 4 | 3 | 0 | 1 | 11 | 7 | +4 | 9 | Advance to third round | 1–5 | — | 2–1 | — | — |
| 3 | Saint Lucia | 4 | 1 | 1 | 2 | 5 | 9 | −4 | 4 | | — | — | — | 2–2 | 2–1 |
| 4 | Aruba | 4 | 0 | 2 | 2 | 3 | 10 | −7 | 2 | | 0–2 | 0–5 | — | — | — |
| 5 | Barbados | 4 | 0 | 1 | 3 | 4 | 10 | −6 | 1 | | — | 1–3 | — | 1–1 | — |

Source: FIFA
Rules for classification: Tiebreakers
5 June 2024
19:30 UTC−4

| Curaçao | 4–1 | Barbados |
|---|---|---|
| Janga 25', 62', 86' (pen.); Kastaneer 90+2' | Report (FIFA); Report (CONCACAF) | Reid-Stephen 90+2' (pen.) |

Ergilio Hato Stadium, Willemstad
Attendance: 4,254
Referee: Iván Barton (El Salvador)
6 June 2024
17:00 UTC−4

| Haiti | 2–1 | Saint Lucia |
|---|---|---|
| Duverne 47'; Nazon 78' | Report (FIFA); Report (CONCACAF) | Elva 18' |

Wildey Turf, Wildey (Barbados)
Attendance: 88
Referee: Ismail Elfath (United States)

8 June 2024
20:00 UTC−4

| Aruba | 0–2 | Curaçao |
|---|---|---|
| | Report (FIFA); Report (CONCACAF) | J. Bacuna 59'; Severina 90+6' |

Trinidad Stadium, Oranjestad
Referee: César Ramos (Mexico)
9 June 2024
17:00 UTC−4

| Barbados | 1–3 | Haiti |
|---|---|---|
| Reid-Stephen 73' | Report (FIFA); Report (CONCACAF) | Deedson 12'; Lacroix 45+1'; Labissiere 84' |

Wildey Turf, Wildey
Referee: Keylor Herrera (Costa Rica)

11 June 2024
15:00 UTC−4

| Saint Lucia | 2–2 | Aruba |
|---|---|---|
| Stanislas 45+2'; Pearson 66' | Report (FIFA); Report (CONCACAF) | Bennett 22'; Marselia 43' (pen.) |

Wildey Turf, Wildey (Barbados)
Attendance: 41
Referee: Selvin Brown (Honduras)

4 June 2025
17:00 UTC−4

| Barbados | 1–1 | Aruba |
|---|---|---|
| Leacock 7' (pen.) | Report (FIFA); Report (CONCACAF) | Luydens 15' |

Wildey Turf, Wildey
Attendance: 500
Referee: Andrew Samuel (Trinidad and Tobago)

6 June 2025
19:30 UTC−4

| Curaçao | 4–0 | Saint Lucia |
|---|---|---|
| Kastaneer 37', 52', 57'; J. Bacuna 74' | Report (FIFA); Report (CONCACAF) |

Ergilio Hato Stadium, Willemstad
Attendance: 7,715
Referee: José Torres (Puerto Rico)
7 June 2025
17:00 UTC−4

| Aruba | 0–5 | Haiti |
|---|---|---|
| | Report (FIFA); Report (CONCACAF) | Jean Jacques 29'; Pierrot 35'; Providence 61'; Nazon 67'; Prunier 86' |

Trinidad Stadium, Oranjestad
Attendance: 673
Referee: Luis Enrique Santander (Mexico)

10 June 2025
18:00 UTC−4

| Saint Lucia | 2–1 | Barbados |
|---|---|---|
| Elva 42' (pen.), 90' | Report (FIFA); Report (CONCACAF) | Richards 12' |

Daren Sammy Cricket Ground, Gros Islet
Attendance: 144
Referee: Sergio Reyna (Guatemala)
10 June 2025
18:00 UTC−4

| Haiti | 1–5 | Curaçao |
|---|---|---|
| Deedson 61' | Report (FIFA); Report (CONCACAF) | Kastaneer 12'; Gorré 15'; Margaritha 69'; Felida 89'; Antonisse 90+3' |

Trinidad Stadium, Oranjestad (Aruba)
Attendance: 1,115
Referee: Steven Madrigal (Costa Rica)

=== Group D ===
| Pos | Team | Pld | W | D | L | GF | GA | GD | Pts | Qualification | (Panama) | (Nicaragua) | (Guyana) | (Montserrat) | (Belize) |
|---|---|---|---|---|---|---|---|---|---|---|---|---|---|---|---|
| 1 | Panama | 4 | 4 | 0 | 0 | 10 | 1 | +9 | 12 | Advance to third round | — | 3–0 | 2–0 | — | — |
| 2 | Nicaragua | 4 | 3 | 0 | 1 | 9 | 4 | +5 | 9 | Advance to third round | — | — | 1–0 | 4–1 | — |
| 3 | Guyana | 4 | 2 | 0 | 2 | 6 | 4 | +2 | 6 | | — | — | — | 3–0 | 3–1 |
| 4 | Montserrat | 4 | 1 | 0 | 3 | 3 | 10 | −7 | 3 | | 1–3 | — | — | — | 1–0 |
| 5 | Belize | 4 | 0 | 0 | 4 | 1 | 10 | −9 | 0 | | 0–2 | 0–4 | — | — | — |

Source: FIFA
Rules for classification: Tiebreakers
5 June 2024
20:00 UTC−6

| Nicaragua | 4–1 | Montserrat |
|---|---|---|
| Moreno 3'; Daniels 23' (o.g.); Montes 69'; Medina 90+3' | Report (FIFA); Report (CONCACAF) | Barzey 9' |

Estadio Nacional, Managua
Attendance: 14,320
Referee: Tori Penso (United States)
6 June 2024
19:30 UTC−5

| Panama | 2–0 | Guyana |
|---|---|---|
| Martínez 62'; Rodríguez 65' | Report (FIFA); Report (CONCACAF) |

Estadio Rommel Fernandez, Panama City
Attendance: 8,575
Referee: Filiberto Martínez (El Salvador)

8 June 2024
18:00 UTC−6

| Belize | 0–4 | Nicaragua |
|---|---|---|
| | Report (FIFA); Report (CONCACAF) | Hernández 40', 65'; Barrera 56'; Moreno 89' |

FFB Field, Belmopan
Referee: Bryan López (Guatemala)
9 June 2024
19:00 UTC−6

| Montserrat | 1–3 | Panama |
|---|---|---|
| Simon 49' | Report (FIFA); Report (CONCACAF) | Welch 41'; Fajardo 62'; Rodríguez 71' |

Estadio Nacional, Managua (Nicaragua)
Attendance: 155
Referee: Ismael Cornejo (El Salvador)

11 June 2024
18:00 UTC−4

| Guyana | 3–1 | Belize |
|---|---|---|
| Moore 66', 72'; Gordon 67' | Report (FIFA); Report (CONCACAF) | Bernárdez 89' |

Wildey Turf, Wildey (Barbados)
Attendance: 110
Referee: Reon Radix (Grenada)

4 June 2025
17:00 UTC−4

| Montserrat | 1–0 | Belize |
|---|---|---|
| Rogers 2' | Report (FIFA); Report (CONCACAF) |

Ato Boldon Stadium, Couva (Trinidad and Tobago)
Attendance: 93
Referee: Kimbell Ward (Saint Kitts and Nevis)

6 June 2025
20:00 UTC−6

| Nicaragua | 1–0 | Guyana |
|---|---|---|
| Moreno 41' | Report (FIFA); Report (CONCACAF) |

Estadio Nacional, Managua
Attendance: 18,532
Referee: Katja Koroleva (United States)
7 June 2025
19:00 UTC−6

| Belize | 0–2 | Panama |
|---|---|---|
| | Report (FIFA); Report (CONCACAF) | Escobar 10'; Guerrero 50' |

FFB Field, Belmopan
Referee: Julio Luna (Guatemala)

10 June 2025
20:00 UTC−4

| Guyana | 3–0 | Montserrat |
|---|---|---|
| Ferguson 35'; De Rosario 38'; Glasgow 72' | Report (FIFA); Report (CONCACAF) |

Synthetic Track and Field Facility, Leonora
Attendance: 530
Referee: Ricangel de Leça (Aruba)
10 June 2025
19:00 UTC−5

| Panama | 3–0 | Nicaragua |
|---|---|---|
| Yanis 56'; Díaz 88'; Davis 90+3' | Report (FIFA); Report (CONCACAF) |

Estadio Rommel Fernandez, Panama City
Attendance: 23,000
Referee: Ismael López (Mexico)

=== Group E ===
| Pos | Team | Pld | W | D | L | GF | GA | GD | Pts | Qualification | (Jamaica) | (Guatemala) | (Dominican Republic) | (Dominica) | (British Virgin Islands) |
|---|---|---|---|---|---|---|---|---|---|---|---|---|---|---|---|
| 1 | Jamaica | 4 | 4 | 0 | 0 | 8 | 2 | +6 | 12 | Advance to third round | — | 3–0 | 1–0 | — | — |
| 2 | Guatemala | 4 | 3 | 0 | 1 | 13 | 5 | +8 | 9 | Advance to third round | — | — | 4–2 | 6–0 | — |
| 3 | Dominican Republic | 4 | 2 | 0 | 2 | 11 | 5 | +6 | 6 | | — | — | — | 5–0 | 4–0 |
| 4 | Dominica | 4 | 1 | 0 | 3 | 5 | 14 | −9 | 3 | | 2–3 | — | — | — | 3–0 |
| 5 | British Virgin Islands | 4 | 0 | 0 | 4 | 0 | 11 | −11 | 0 | | 0–1 | 0–3 | — | — | — |

Source: FIFA
Rules for classification: Tiebreakers
5 June 2024
20:00 UTC−6

| Guatemala | 6–0 | Dominica |
|---|---|---|
| Galindo 4', 48'; Yanes 27'; Rubin 58'; Martínez 78'; Morales 83' | Report (FIFA); Report (CONCACAF) |

Estadio Doroteo Guamuch Flores, Guatemala City
Attendance: 18,313
Referee: Víctor Cáceres (Mexico)
6 June 2024
15:30 UTC−5

| Jamaica | 1–0 | Dominican Republic |
|---|---|---|
| Nicholson 17' | Report (FIFA); Report (CONCACAF) |

Independence Park, Kingston
Attendance: 9,266
Referee: Drew Fischer (Canada)

8 June 2024
15:00 UTC−4

| British Virgin Islands | 0–3 | Guatemala |
|---|---|---|
| | Report (FIFA); Report (CONCACAF) | Castellanos 23'; Rubin 45+4'; Pinto 47' (pen.) |

A. O. Shirley Recreation Ground, Road Town
Referee: Kwinsi Williams (Trinidad and Tobago)
9 June 2024
15:00 UTC−4

| Dominica | 2–3 | Jamaica |
|---|---|---|
| George 83'; Jules 89' | Report (FIFA); Report (CONCACAF) | Nicholson 31', 80' (pen.); Dixon 43' |

Windsor Park, Roseau
Attendance: 6,500
Referee: Fernando Guerrero (Mexico)

11 June 2024
20:00 UTC−4

| Dominican Republic | 4–0 | British Virgin Islands |
|---|---|---|
| Núñez 2', 31'; Romero 15' (pen.), 90+3' | Report (FIFA); Report (CONCACAF) |

Estadio Panamericano, San Cristóbal
Attendance: 1,100
Referee: Adonai Escobedo (Mexico)

4 June 2025
15:00 UTC−4

| Dominica | 3–0 | British Virgin Islands |
|---|---|---|
| Laville 29', 75'; Jules 35' | Report (FIFA); Report (CONCACAF) |

Windsor Park, Roseau
Attendance: 754
Referee: Karen Hernández (Mexico)

6 June 2025
20:30 UTC−6

| Guatemala | 4–2 | Dominican Republic |
|---|---|---|
| Santis 6', 59', 62'; Samayoa 53' | Report (FIFA); Report (CONCACAF) | Romero 16'; Mörschel 36' |

Estadio Cementos Progreso, Guatemala City
Attendance: 13,642
Referee: Guido Gonzales Jr. (United States)
7 June 2025
15:00 UTC−4

| British Virgin Islands | 0–1 | Jamaica |
|---|---|---|
| | Report (FIFA); Report (CONCACAF) | Brown 17' |

A. O. Shirley Recreation Ground, Road Town
Attendance: 1,060
Referee: Bryan López (Guatemala)

10 June 2025
19:00 UTC−4

| Dominican Republic | 5–0 | Dominica |
|---|---|---|
| Romero 16'; Kaparos 33'; Dollenmayer 39'; Reyes 44'; Peter 89' | Report (FIFA); Report (CONCACAF) |

Félix Sánchez Olympic Stadium, Santo Domingo
Attendance: 6,850
Referee: Marianela Araya (Costa Rica)
10 June 2025
18:00 UTC−5

| Jamaica | 3–0 | Guatemala |
|---|---|---|
| Russell 26'; Brown 37', 73' | Report (FIFA); Report (CONCACAF) |

Independence Park, Kingston
Attendance: 7,000
Referee: David Gómez (Costa Rica)

=== Group F ===
| Pos | Team | Pld | W | D | L | GF | GA | GD | Pts | Qualification | (Suriname) | (El Salvador) | (Puerto Rico) | (Saint Vincent and the Grenadines) | (Anguilla) |
|---|---|---|---|---|---|---|---|---|---|---|---|---|---|---|---|
| 1 | Suriname | 4 | 3 | 1 | 0 | 10 | 2 | +8 | 10 | Advance to third round | — | — | 1–0 | 4–1 | — |
| 2 | El Salvador | 4 | 2 | 2 | 0 | 7 | 2 | +5 | 8 | Advance to third round | 1–1 | — | 0–0 | — | — |
| 3 | Puerto Rico | 4 | 2 | 1 | 1 | 10 | 2 | +8 | 7 | | — | — | — | 2–1 | 8–0 |
| 4 | Saint Vincent and the Grenadines | 4 | 1 | 0 | 3 | 9 | 9 | 0 | 3 | | — | 1–3 | — | — | 6–0 |
| 5 | Anguilla | 4 | 0 | 0 | 4 | 0 | 21 | −21 | 0 | | 0–4 | 0–3 | — | — | — |

Source: FIFA
Rules for classification: Tiebreakers
5 June 2024
18:00 UTC−3

| Suriname | 4–1 | Saint Vincent and the Grenadines |
|---|---|---|
| Becker 39' (pen.); Hilterman 45+2'; Lonwijk 46'; Montnor 70' | Report (FIFA); Report (CONCACAF) | Anderson 31' |

Franklin Essed Stadion, Paramaribo
Attendance: 3,220
Referee: Joe Dickerson (United States)
6 June 2024
20:30 UTC−6

| El Salvador | 0–0 | Puerto Rico |
|---|---|---|
| | Report (FIFA); Report (CONCACAF) |

Estadio Cuscatlán, San Salvador
Attendance: 10,851
Referee: Saíd Martínez (Honduras)

8 June 2024
15:30 UTC−4

| Anguilla | 0–4 | Suriname |
|---|---|---|
| | Report (FIFA); Report (CONCACAF) | Conraad 10', 75'; Pinas 62'; Austin 88' (o.g.) |

Raymond E. Guishard Technical Centre, The Valley
Attendance: 600
Referee: Hakeem Harvey (Saint Kitts and Nevis)
9 June 2024
16:00 UTC−3

| Saint Vincent and the Grenadines | 1–3 | El Salvador |
|---|---|---|
| Anderson 43' | Report (FIFA); Report (CONCACAF) | Henríquez 10'; Tejada 60'; Bonilla 83' |

Franklin Essed Stadion, Paramaribo (Suriname)
Attendance: 200
Referee: Shavin Greene (Guyana)

11 June 2024
20:00 UTC−4

| Puerto Rico | 8–0 | Anguilla |
|---|---|---|
| De León 20' (pen.), 51'; Ydrach 31'; W. Rivera 48', 65'; L. Antonetti 59'; Ríos 71'; Cardona 90+1' | Report (FIFA); Report (CONCACAF) |

Juan Ramon Loubriel Stadium, Bayamón
Attendance: 10,000
Referee: Oshane Nation (Jamaica)

4 June 2025
19:00 UTC−4

| Saint Vincent and the Grenadines | 6–0 | Anguilla |
|---|---|---|
| Anderson 20', 69'; Stewart 25' (pen.); Joseph 59'; Edwards 61'; Franklyn 85' | Report (FIFA); Report (CONCACAF) |

Arnos Vale Stadium, Kingstown
Attendance: 3,500
Referee: Steffon Dewar (Jamaica)

6 June 2025
19:00 UTC−3

| Suriname | 1–0 | Puerto Rico |
|---|---|---|
| Montnor 79' | Report (FIFA); Report (CONCACAF) |

Franklin Essed Stadion, Paramaribo
Referee: Nelson Salgado (Honduras)
7 June 2025
15:00 UTC−4

| Anguilla | 0–3 | El Salvador |
|---|---|---|
| | Report (FIFA); Report (CONCACAF) | Ortiz 30'; Gil 45+5'; Alvarado 77' |

Raymond E. Guishard Technical Centre, The Valley
Attendance: 543
Referee: Filip Dujic (Canada)

10 June 2025
21:00 UTC−4

| Puerto Rico | 2–1 | Saint Vincent and the Grenadines |
|---|---|---|
| Antonetti 11'; Echevarria 77' | Report (FIFA); Report (CONCACAF) | Anderson 47' |

Mayagüez Athletics Stadium, Mayagüez
Referee: Randy Solano (Dominican Republic)
10 June 2025
19:00 UTC−6

| El Salvador | 1–1 | Suriname |
|---|---|---|
| Gil 32' | Report (FIFA); Report (CONCACAF) | Lonwijk 19' |

Estadio Cuscatlán, San Salvador
Attendance: 20,675
Referee: Jon Freemon (United States)

== Goalscorers ==
There were 216 goals scored in 59 matches, for an average of 3.66 goals per match.

5 goals

- (Curaçao national football team) Gervane Kastaneer
- (Saint Vincent and the Grenadines national football team) Oalex Anderson

4 goals

- (Dominican Republic national football team) Dorny Romero

3 goals

- (Costa Rica national football team) Orlando Galo
- (Costa Rica national football team) Warren Madrigal
- (Curaçao national football team) Rangelo Janga
- (Guatemala national football team) Óscar Santis
- (Jamaica national football team) Warner Brown
- (Jamaica national football team) Shamar Nicholson
- (Nicaragua national football team) Jaime Moreno
- (Saint Lucia national football team) Caniggia Elva

2 goals

- (Barbados national football team) Niall Reid-Stephen
- (Bermuda national football team) Reggie Lambe
- (Bermuda national football team) Zeiko Lewis
- (Bermuda national football team) Djair Parfitt
- (Costa Rica national football team) Manfred Ugalde
- (Costa Rica national football team) Álvaro Zamora
- (Curaçao national football team) Juninho Bacuna
- (Dominica national football team) Troy Jules
- (Dominica national football team) Audel Laville
- (Dominican Republic national football team) Rafael Núñez
- (El Salvador national football team) Brayan Gil
- (Grenada national football team) Jermaine Francis
- (Grenada national football team) Myles Hippolyte
- (Grenada national football team) Darius Johnson
- (Guatemala national football team) Alejandro Galindo
- (Guatemala national football team) Rubio Rubin
- (Guyana national football team) Deon Moore
- (Haiti national football team) Louicius Deedson
- (Haiti national football team) Duckens Nazon
- (Honduras national football team) Edwin Rodríguez
- (Nicaragua national football team) Bancy Hernández
- (Panama national football team) José Luis Rodríguez
- (Puerto Rico national football team) Leandro Antonetti
- (Puerto Rico national football team) Jeremy de León
- (Puerto Rico national football team) Wilfredo Rivera
- (Suriname national football team) Tyrone Conraad
- (Suriname national football team) Justin Lonwijk
- (Suriname national football team) Jaden Montnor
- (Trinidad and Tobago national football team) Levi García
- (Trinidad and Tobago national football team) Nathaniel James
- (Trinidad and Tobago national football team) Reon Moore
- (Trinidad and Tobago national football team) Duane Muckette
- (Trinidad and Tobago national football team) Dante Sealy
- (Trinidad and Tobago national football team) Malcolm Shaw

1 goal

- (Antigua and Barbuda national football team) Raheem Deterville
- (Aruba national football team) Walter Bennett
- (Aruba national football team) Diederick Luydens
- (Aruba national football team) Isai Marselia
- (Bahamas national football team) Wood Julmis
- (Barbados national football team) Omani Leacock
- (Barbados national football team) Devonte Richards
- (Belize national football team) Carlos Bernárdez
- (Bermuda national football team) Julian Carpenter
- (Bermuda national football team) Kole Hall
- (Bermuda national football team) Sachiel Ming
- (Cayman Islands national football team) Joshwa Campbell
- (Costa Rica national football team) Josimar Alcócer
- (Costa Rica national football team) Alejandro Bran
- (Costa Rica national football team) Alonso Martínez
- (Costa Rica national football team) Jeyland Mitchell
- (Costa Rica national football team) Joseph Mora
- (Costa Rica national football team) Andy Rojas
- (Costa Rica national football team) Gerald Taylor
- (Cuba national football team) Jorge Aguirre
- (Cuba national football team) Pedro Bravo
- (Cuba national football team) Maikel Reyes
- (Curaçao national football team) Jeremy Antonisse
- (Curaçao national football team) Kevin Felida
- (Curaçao national football team) Kenji Gorré
- (Curaçao national football team) Jearl Margaritha
- (Curaçao national football team) Xander Severina
- (Dominica national football team) Javid George
- (Dominican Republic national football team) Noah Dollenmayer
- (Dominican Republic national football team) Peter González
- (Dominican Republic national football team) Jimmy Kaparos
- (Dominican Republic national football team) Heinz Mörschel
- (Dominican Republic national football team) Edarlyn Reyes
- (El Salvador national football team) Elvin Alvarado
- (El Salvador national football team) Nelson Bonilla
- (El Salvador national football team) Jairo Henríquez
- (El Salvador national football team) Santos Ortíz
- (El Salvador national football team) Rafael Tejada
- (Grenada national football team) Regan Charles-Cook
- (Grenada national football team) Keishean Francois
- (Grenada national football team) Kayden Harrack
- (Grenada national football team) Joshua Isaac
- (Grenada national football team) Saydrel Lewis
- (Guatemala national football team) Óscar Castellanos
- (Guatemala national football team) José Carlos Martínez
- (Guatemala national football team) José Morales
- (Guatemala national football team) José Carlos Pinto
- (Guatemala national football team) Nicolás Samayoa
- (Guatemala national football team) Allen Yanes
- (Guyana national football team) Osaze De Rosario
- (Guyana national football team) Nathan Ferguson
- (Guyana national football team) Omari Glasgow
- (Guyana national football team) Liam Gordon
- (Haiti national football team) Jean-Kévin Duverne
- (Haiti national football team) Danley Jean Jacques
- (Haiti national football team) Bryan Labissiere
- (Haiti national football team) Duke Lacroix
- (Haiti national football team) Frantzdy Pierrot
- (Haiti national football team) Ruben Providence
- (Haiti national football team) Mondy Prunier
- (Honduras national football team) Kervin Arriaga
- (Honduras national football team) Rubilio Castillo
- (Honduras national football team) Anthony Lozano
- (Honduras national football team) Getsel Montes
- (Honduras national football team) Andy Najar
- (Honduras national football team) Bryan Róchez
- (Honduras national football team) David Ruiz
- (Honduras national football team) Alexy Vega
- (Honduras national football team) Luis Vega
- (Jamaica national football team) Kaheim Dixon
- (Jamaica national football team) Jon Russell
- (Montserrat national football team) Brandon Barzey
- (Montserrat national football team) Mark Rogers
- (Montserrat national football team) Kaleem Simon
- (Nicaragua national football team) Juan Barrera
- (Nicaragua national football team) Harold Medina
- (Nicaragua national football team) Jacob Montes
- (Panama national football team) Eric Davis
- (Panama national football team) Ismael Díaz
- (Panama national football team) Fidel Escobar
- (Panama national football team) José Fajardo
- (Panama national football team) Eduardo Guerrero
- (Panama national football team) Cristian Martínez
- (Panama national football team) Jovani Welch
- (Panama national football team) César Yanis
- (Puerto Rico national football team) Nicolás Cardona
- (Puerto Rico national football team) Steven Echevarría
- (Puerto Rico national football team) Darren Ríos
- (Puerto Rico national football team) Roberto Ydrach
- (Saint Kitts and Nevis national football team) G'Vaune Amory
- (Saint Kitts and Nevis national football team) Ethan Bristow
- (Saint Kitts and Nevis national football team) Romaine Sawyers
- (Saint Kitts and Nevis national football team) Tyreece Simpson
- (Saint Kitts and Nevis national football team) Tiquanny Williams
- (Saint Lucia national football team) Peter Pearson
- (Saint Lucia national football team) Ridel Stanislas
- (Saint Vincent and the Grenadines national football team) Kyle Edwards
- (Saint Vincent and the Grenadines national football team) Kirtney Franklyn
- (Saint Vincent and the Grenadines national football team) Micah Joseph
- (Saint Vincent and the Grenadines national football team) Cornelius Stewart
- (Suriname national football team) Sheraldo Becker
- (Suriname national football team) Jeredy Hilterman
- (Suriname national football team) Shaquille Pinas
- (Trinidad and Tobago national football team) Ajani Fortune
- (Trinidad and Tobago national football team) Alvin Jones
- (Trinidad and Tobago national football team) Kevin Molino
- (Trinidad and Tobago national football team) Ryan Telfer

1 own goal

- (Anguilla national football team) Steven Austin (against Suriname)
- (Cayman Islands national football team) Wesley Robinson (against Honduras)
- (Montserrat national football team) Donervon Daniels (against Nicaragua)

== Discipline ==
A player was automatically suspended for the next match for the following infractions:

- Receiving a red card (red card suspensions may be extended for serious infractions)
- Receiving two yellow cards in two different matches (yellow card suspensions are carried forward to further qualification rounds, but not the finals or any other future international matches)

The following suspensions were served during the second round:

| Team | Player | Infraction(s) | Suspended for match(es) |
|---|---|---|---|
| Antigua and Barbuda | Leroy Graham | (red card) vs Cuba (6 June 2025) | vs Honduras (10 June 2025) |
| Aruba | Fernando Lewis | (yellow card) vs Curaçao (8 June 2024); (yellow card) vs Saint Lucia (11 June 2024) | vs Barbados (4 June 2025) |
| Bahamas | Jean Tilo | (yellow card) (yellow-red card) vs Saint Kitts and Nevis (11 June 2024) | vs Grenada (4 June 2025) |
| Barbados | Nicoli Brathwaite | (yellow card) vs Haiti (9 June 2024); (yellow card) vs Aruba (4 June 2025) | vs Saint Lucia (10 June 2025) |
| British Virgin Islands | Luka Chalwell | (yellow card) vs Guatemala (8 June 2024); (yellow card) vs Dominica (4 June 2025) | vs Jamaica (7 June 2025) |
| Dominican Republic | Jean Carlos López | (yellow card) vs Jamaica (6 June 2024); (yellow card) vs Guatemala (6 June 2025) | vs Dominica (10 June 2025) |
| Montserrat | Lenni Cirino | (yellow card) vs Nicaragua (5 June 2024); (yellow card) vs Belize (4 June 2025) | vs Guyana (10 June 2025) |
| Panama | José Córdoba | (yellow card) vs Guyana (6 June 2024); (yellow card) vs Belize (7 June 2025) | vs Nicaragua (10 June 2025) |
| Panama | José Luis Rodríguez | (yellow card) vs Guyana (6 June 2024); (yellow card) vs Belize (7 June 2025) | vs Nicaragua (10 June 2025) |
| Saint Kitts and Nevis | Lois Maynard | (yellow card) vs Costa Rica (6 June 2024); (yellow card) vs Bahamas (11 June 2024) | vs Trinidad and Tobago (6 June 2025) |
| Saint Kitts and Nevis | Omari Sterling-James | (yellow card) vs Costa Rica (6 June 2024); (yellow card) vs Trinidad and Tobago (6 June 2025) | vs Grenada (10 June 2025) |
| Saint Lucia | Melvin Doxilly | (yellow card) vs Haiti (6 June 2024); (yellow card) vs Aruba (11 June 2024) | vs Curaçao (6 June 2025) |
| Suriname | Stefano Denswil | (yellow card) vs Saint Vincent and the Grenadines (5 June 2024); (yellow card) vs Anguilla (8 June 2024) | vs Puerto Rico (6 June 2025) |
