= 2023–24 CONCACAF Nations League C =

Tournament details
- Dates: 7 September 2023 – 21 November 2023
- Teams: 9
- Promoted: Aruba; Bonaire; Dominica; Saint Martin

Tournament statistics
- Matches played: 18
- Goals scored: 69 (3.83 per match)
- Top scorer(s): (Collectivity of Saint Martin) Axel Raga (8 goals)

The 2023–24 CONCACAF Nations League C was the third and lowest division of the 2023–24 edition of the CONCACAF Nations League, the third season of the international football competition involving the men's national teams of the 41 member associations of CONCACAF. It was held from 7 September to 21 November 2023.

== Format ==
Starting from this edition, League C was reduced from thirteen to nine teams which were split into three groups of three teams instead the four groups of previous editions. The teams competed on a home-and-away round-robin basis within each group, with matches being played in the official FIFA match windows in September, October and November 2023. The first-placed team of each group and the best second-placed team among all groups were promoted to the 2024–25 CONCACAF Nations League B.

== Teams ==
A total of nine national teams contested League C. As a result of the reduction to 9 teams, there were no teams relegated from League B the previous season, so the nine teams that failed to be promoted last season conformed the League C for this edition.

=== Team changes ===
The following were the team changes of League C regarding the 2022–23 season:

Outgoing
Promoted to
Nations League B
- Puerto Rico
- Saint Kitts and Nevis
- Saint Lucia
- Sint Maarten

=== Seeding ===
The pots were confirmed on 2 May 2023, with the sixteen League C teams being split into three pots of three teams, based on the CONCACAF Rankings as of 31 March 2023.

Pot 1
Team	Pts	Rank
Bonaire	627	31
Dominica	572	32
Aruba	564	33

Pot 2
Team	Pts	Rank
Turks and Caicos Islands	461	35
Cayman Islands	435	36
Saint Martin	377	38

Pot 3
Team	Pts	Rank
Anguilla	224	39
U.S. Virgin Islands	193	40
British Virgin Islands	163	41

=== Draw ===
The groups draw was held on 16 May 2023, 19:00 EDT, in Miami, Florida, United States, where the nine involved teams were drawn into three groups of three. The draw began by randomly selecting a team from Pot 1 and placing them in Group A and then selecting the remaining teams from Pot 1 and placling them into Groups B and C in sequential order. The draw continued with the same procedure done for the remaining pots.

The draw resulted in the following groups:

Group A
Pos	Team
A1	Bonaire
A2	Saint Martin
A3	Anguilla

Group B
Pos	Team
B1	Aruba
B2	Cayman Islands
B3	U.S. Virgin Islands

Group C
Pos	Team
C1	Dominica
C2	Turks and Caicos Islands
C3	British Virgin Islands

== Groups ==
The fixture list was confirmed by CONCACAF on 6 July 2023. All match times are in EDT (UTC−4) for September and October matches and EST (UTC−5) for November matches, as listed by CONCACAF (local times, if different, are in parentheses).

=== Group A ===
Pos	Team	Pld	W	D	L	GF	GA	GD	Pts	Promotion	(Collectivity of Saint Martin)	(Bonaire)	(Anguilla)
1	Saint Martin (P)	4	4	0	0	20	1	+19	12	Promotion to League B	—	2–1	8–0
2	Bonaire (P)	4	2	0	2	6	6	0	6	Promotion to League B	0–4	—	2–0
3	Anguilla	4	0	0	4	0	19	−19	0		0–6	0–3	—

Source: CONCACAF
Rules for classification: Tiebreakers
(P) Promoted
7 September 2023
16:00

Anguilla	0–6	Saint Martin
	Report	Raga 6', 32', 38', 40'; Segarel 25'; Lacazette 70'

Raymond E. Guishard Technical Centre, The Valley
Referee: Fernando Hernández (Mexico)

11 September 2023
19:00 (Note: The Saint Martin v Bonaire match, originally scheduled at 15:30 EDT (UTC−4), was re-scheduled to 19:00 EDT.)

Saint Martin	2–1	Bonaire
Raga 75'; Casper 88' (o.g.)	Report	Martinus 67'

SKNFA Technical Center, Basseterre (Saint Kitts and Nevis)
Referee: Reginald Gumbs (Saint Kitts and Nevis)

12 October 2023
19:00

Bonaire	2–0	Anguilla
Ronde 10'; Pourier 36'	Report

Stadion Antonio Trenidat, Rincon
Attendance: 660
Referee: Norberto da Silva (Curaçao)

16 October 2023
16:00

Saint Martin	8–0	Anguilla
Segarel 17', 32' (pen.), 39', 47'; Richardson 49'; Raga 65', 70', 88'	Report

SKNFA Technical Center, Basseterre (Saint Kitts and Nevis)
Referee: Jaime Herrera (El Salvador)

18 November 2023
14:00 (15:00 UTC−4)

Anguilla	0–3	Bonaire
	Report	Anthony 2', 6' (pen.); Michiel 73'

Raymond E. Guishard Technical Centre, The Valley
Attendance: 267
Referee: Tristley Bassue (Saint Kitts and Nevis)

21 November 2023
18:00 (19:00 UTC−4)

Bonaire	0–4	Saint Martin
	Report	Gentes 3', 45+2'; Lebon 13'; Richardson 46'

Stadion Antonio Trenidat, Rincon
Referee: Ricangel de Leça (Aruba)

=== Group B ===
Pos	Team	Pld	W	D	L	GF	GA	GD	Pts	Promotion	(Aruba)	(Cayman Islands)	(United States Virgin Islands)
1	Aruba (P)	4	4	0	0	14	4	+10	12	Promotion to League B	—	5–1	3–1
2	Cayman Islands	4	1	1	2	6	10	−4	4		1–2	—	2–1
3	U.S. Virgin Islands	4	0	1	3	5	11	−6	1		1–4	2–2	—

Source: CONCACAF
Rules for classification: Tiebreakers
(P) Promoted
7 September 2023
19:00

U.S. Virgin Islands	2–2	Cayman Islands
McLaughlin 23' (o.g.); St. Louis 42'	Report	Jo. Ebanks 16'; Gray 47'

Bethlehem Soccer Stadium, Upper Bethlehem
Referee: Reon Radix (Grenada)

11 September 2023
16:30 (15:30 UTC−5)

Cayman Islands	1–2	Aruba
Reeves 6'	Report	Ostiana 2'; Bäly 79'

Truman Bodden Sports Complex, George Town
Referee: Ismael Cornejo (El Salvador)

14 October 2023
15:00

Aruba	3–1	U.S. Virgin Islands
Ostiana 52'; Luydens 61'; Molina 86'	Report	Farrell 63'

Trinidad Stadium, Oranjestad
Referee: Kwinsi Williams (Trinidad and Tobago)

17 October 2023
16:30 (15:30 UTC−5)

Cayman Islands	2–1	U.S. Virgin Islands
Seymour 17'; Reeves 57'	Report	Joseph 84'

Truman Bodden Sports Complex, George Town
Attendance: 647
Referee: Randy Encarnación (Dominican Republic)

16 November 2023
18:00 (19:00 UTC−4)

U.S. Virgin Islands	1–4	Aruba
Farrell 47'	Report	Dania 23'; Ostiana 41', 52'; Maria 79' (pen.)

Bethlehem Soccer Stadium, Upper Bethlehem
Attendance: 286
Referee: Ken Pennyfeather (Antigua and Barbuda)

20 November 2023
14:00 (15:00 UTC−4)

Aruba	5–1	Cayman Islands
Groothusen 16', 89'; Ostiana 45+5'; Maria 55'; Dania 77'	Report	Studenhofft 49'

Trinidad Stadium, Oranjestad
Referee: Norberto da Silva (Curaçao)

=== Group C ===
Pos	Team	Pld	W	D	L	GF	GA	GD	Pts	Promotion	(Dominica)	(British Virgin Islands)	(Turks and Caicos Islands)
1	Dominica (P)	4	3	1	0	8	2	+6	10	Promotion to League B	—	1–1	2–0
2	British Virgin Islands	4	1	2	1	7	6	+1	5		1–2	—	3–1
3	Turks and Caicos Islands	4	0	1	3	3	10	−7	1		0–3	2–2	—

Source: CONCACAF
Rules for classification: Tiebreakers
(P) Promoted
9 September 2023
15:30

British Virgin Islands	3–1	Turks and Caicos Islands
Caesar 4'; Chalwell 10', 50'	Report	Forbes 45+4' (pen.)

A. O. Shirley Recreation Ground, Road Town
Referee: Victor Rivas (United States)

12 September 2023
16:00

Turks and Caicos Islands	0–3	Dominica
	Report	Jules 18', 64'; Thomas 90+3'

TCIFA National Academy, Providenciales
Referee: Benjamin Whitty (Cayman Islands)

12 October 2023
17:00 (Note: The Dominica v British Virgin Islands match, originally scheduled at 20:00 EDT (UTC−4), was re-scheduled to 17:00 EDT.)

Dominica	1–1	British Virgin Islands
Thomas 82'	Report	Chalwell 29'

Daren Sammy Cricket Ground, Gros Islet (Saint Lucia)
Attendance: 726
Referee: Ricangel de Leça (Aruba)

16 October 2023
16:00

Turks and Caicos Islands	2–2	British Virgin Islands
Forbes 26' (pen.), 76'	Report	Bertie 3'; Smith 90+5'

TCIFA National Academy, Providenciales
Attendance: 250
Referee: Hakeem Harvey (Saint Kitts and Nevis)

16 November 2023
14:00 (15:00 UTC−4)

British Virgin Islands	1–2	Dominica
Gallimore 63'	Report	Laville 52'; Marshall 68'

A. O. Shirley Recreation Ground, Road Town
Attendance: 385
Referee: Reginald Gumbs (Saint Kitts and Nevis)

20 November 2023
14:00 (15:00 UTC−4)

Dominica	2–0	Turks and Caicos Islands
Laville 15'; George 61'	Report

A. O. Shirley Recreation Ground, Road Town (British Virgin Islands)
Referee: Timothy Derry (Trinidad and Tobago)

=== Ranking of second-placed teams ===
Pos	Grp	Team	Pld	W	D	L	GF	GA	GD	Pts	Promotion
1	A	Bonaire (P)	4	2	0	2	6	6	0	6	Promotion to League B
2	C	British Virgin Islands	4	1	2	1	7	6	+1	5	
3	B	Cayman Islands	4	1	1	2	6	10	−4	4	

Source: CONCACAF
Rules for classification: Tiebreakers
(P) Promoted

== Goalscorers ==
There were 69 goals scored in 18 matches, for an average of 3.83 goals per match.

8 goals

- (Collectivity of Saint Martin) Axel Raga

5 goals

- (Aruba) Rovien Ostiana
- (Collectivity of Saint Martin) Stanley Segarel

3 goals

- (British Virgin Islands) Luka Chalwell
- (Turks and Caicos Islands) Billy Forbes

2 goals

- (Aruba) Jaydon Dania
- (Aruba) Terence Groothusen
- (Aruba) Benjamin Maria
- (Bonaire) Thierry Anthony
- (Cayman Islands) Christopher Reeves
- (Dominica) Troy Jules
- (Dominica) Audel Laville
- (Dominica) Briel Thomas
- (Collectivity of Saint Martin) Randy Gentes
- (Collectivity of Saint Martin) Emmanuel Richardson
- (United States Virgin Islands) Quinn Farrell

1 goal

- (Aruba) Darryl Bäly
- (Aruba) Diederick Luydens
- (Aruba) Mishawn Molina
- (Bonaire) Sheehander Martinus
- (Bonaire) Freadyen Michiel
- (Bonaire) Marschelon Pourier
- (Bonaire) Ginel Ronde
- (British Virgin Islands) Joshua Bertie
- (British Virgin Islands) Troy Caesar
- (British Virgin Islands) T´Sharne Gallimore
- (British Virgin Islands) Justin Smith
- (Cayman Islands) Jonah Ebanks
- (Cayman Islands) Cameron Gray
- (Cayman Islands) Elijah Seymour
- (Cayman Islands) Gunnar Studenhofft
- (Dominica) Javid George
- (Dominica) Eustace Marshall
- (Collectivity of Saint Martin) Romuald Lacazette
- (Collectivity of Saint Martin) Keelan Lebon
- (United States Virgin Islands) Rakeem Joseph
- (United States Virgin Islands) Jimson St. Louis

1 own goal

- (Bonaire) Daymerick Casper (against Saint Martin)
- (Cayman Islands) Casey McLaughlin (against U.S. Virgin Islands)
