= 2023–24 CONCACAF Nations League =

Association football tournament

Tournament details
- Dates: League A: 7 September – 17 October 2023; Leagues B and C: 7 September – 21 November 2023; League A quarter-finals: 16–21 November 2023; Nations League Finals: 21–24 March 2024
- Teams: 41

Final positions
- Champions: United States (3rd title)
- Runners-up: Mexico
- Third place: Jamaica
- Fourth place: Panama

Tournament statistics
- Matches played: 93
- Goals scored: 317 (3.41 per match)
- Top scorer(s): (Collectivity of Saint Martin) Axel Raga (8 goals)
- Best player: (United States) Giovanni Reyna
- Best young player: (Guyana) Omari Glasgow
- Best goalkeeper: (United States) Matt Turner
- Fair play award: Panama

The 2023–24 CONCACAF Nations League was the third season of the CONCACAF Nations League, an international association football competition involving the men's national teams of the 41 member associations of CONCACAF. The group stage was held in September, October, and November 2023, and the Finals were played from 21 to 24 March 2024 at AT&T Stadium in Arlington, Texas.

The competition saw a format change, with League A now featuring sixteen teams and a quarter-final round. In addition, the Nations League also served as qualification for CONCACAF teams for the 2024 Copa América, which was held between June and July of that year in the United States.

The United States were the two-time defending champions and successfully defended their title in the final.

== Format ==
On 28 February 2023, CONCACAF announced a format change for the 2023–24 season of the CONCACAF Nations League. As a result, no teams were relegated from the 2022–23 season.

The size of League A was increased from twelve to sixteen teams, and now featured a quarter-final round. The twelve lowest-ranked teams in the CONCACAF Rankings of March 2023 entered the group stage, now using a modified group format. The teams were divided into two groups of six teams, with each team playing four matches against group opponents (two at home and two away). The top four teams advanced to the quarter-finals, and were joined by the four top-ranked teams in the CONCACAF Rankings of March 2023. The teams advancing from the group stage were drawn into ties against the top-ranked teams, which were played on a two-legged home-and-away basis. The four quarter-finals winners advanced to the Nations League Finals, which retained its previous format of a semi-final round, third place play-off and final match to determine the champions.

League A also determined the six CONCACAF teams which qualified as guests for the 2024 Copa América in the United States. The quarter-finals winners qualified directly to the tournament, while the losers advanced to a qualifying play-off, featuring two single-leg matches.

League B remained unchanged, featuring sixteen teams divided into four groups of four. Each team played six matches in a double round-robin home-and-away format (three at home and three away). Following the format change, League C was reduced from thirteen to nine teams and from four to three groups. Teams were divided into three groups of three teams, with each team playing four matches in a double round-robin home-and-away format (two at home and two away).

Promotion and relegation resumed for the 2023–24 season, with the fifth and sixth placed teams in League A and the fourth-placed teams in League B being relegated for the next season. The group winners of Leagues B and C were promoted, as were the best second-placed team of League C.

=== Tiebreakers ===
The ranking of teams in each group was determined as follows (Regulations Article 12.4):

1. Points obtained in all group matches (three points for a win, one for a draw, zero for a loss);
2. Goal difference in all group matches;
3. Number of goals scored in all group matches;

If two or more teams still tied based on the above criteria, their rankings were determined as follows:

1. Points obtained in the matches played between the teams in question;
2. Goal difference in the matches played between the teams in question;
3. Number of goals scored in the matches played between the teams in question;
4. Number of away goals scored in the matches played between the teams in question (if the tie was only between two teams);
5. Lowest number of disciplinary points in all group matches (only one deduction could be applied to a player in a single match):
  - Yellow card: 1 points;
  - Indirect red card (second yellow card): 3 points;
  - Direct red card: 4 points;
  - Yellow card and direct red card: 5 points;
6. Drawing of lots.

== Entrants ==
All of CONCACAF's 41 member associations entered in the competition. Teams were divided into leagues based on their results of the 2022–23 season, while the pots were determined by the CONCACAF Ranking of March 2023. The four top-ranked teams in League A received a bye to the quarter-finals. The group stage draw was held on 16 May 2023, 19:00 EDT, in Miami, Florida, United States. The pots were confirmed on 2 May 2023, with League A split into six pots of two teams, League B split into four pots of four teams and League C split into three pots of three teams.

Nicaragua originally qualified for promotion to League A as winners of League B Group C, but were disqualified due to fielding an ineligible player. As a result, they were replaced by Trinidad and Tobago as the best runner-up in League B on 12 June 2023. Nicaragua replaced Trinidad and Tobago in League B.

Key
▲	Promoted in previous season

League A
Pot	Team	Prv	Pts	Rank
QF	Mexico	Same position	1,939	1
QF	United States	Same position	1,919	2
QF	Costa Rica	Same position	1,796	3
QF	Canada	Same position	1,743	4
1	Panama	Same position	1,695	5
1	Haiti	▲	1,482	6
2	Jamaica	Same position	1,479	7
2	Guatemala	▲	1,405	8
3	Honduras	Same position	1,403	9
3	El Salvador	Same position	1,330	10
4	Martinique	Same position	1,246	12
4	Cuba	▲	1,176	13
5	Curaçao	Same position	1,171	14
5	Suriname	Same position	1,079	16
6	Trinidad and Tobago	▲	1,254	11
6	Grenada	Same position	791	25

League B
Pot	Team	Prv	Pts	Rank
1	Nicaragua	Same position	1,067	17
1	French Guiana	Same position	1,086	15
1	Guyana	Same position	994	18
1	Guadeloupe	Same position	966	19
2	Antigua and Barbuda	Same position	949	20
2	Saint Kitts and Nevis	▲	923	21
2	Dominican Republic	Same position	913	22
2	Bermuda	Same position	863	23
3	Saint Lucia	▲	795	24
3	Puerto Rico	▲	790	26
3	Montserrat	Same position	780	27
3	Saint Vincent and the Grenadines	Same position	726	28
4	Belize	Same position	715	29
4	Barbados	Same position	681	30
4	Bahamas	Same position	530	34
4	Sint Maarten	▲	413	37

League C
Pot	Team	Pts	Rank
1	Bonaire	627	31
1	Dominica	572	32
1	Aruba	564	33
2	Turks and Caicos Islands	461	35
2	Cayman Islands	435	36
2	Saint Martin	377	38
3	Anguilla	224	39
3	U.S. Virgin Islands	193	40
3	British Virgin Islands	163	41

== Schedule ==
Below was the schedule of the 2023–24 CONCACAF Nations League. The fixture dates for the group matches were confirmed on 6 July 2023.

Round		Dates
League A	League B and C	Dates
Matchday 1		7–9 September 2023
Matchday 2		10–12 September 2023
Matchday 3		12–14 October 2023
Matchday 4		15–17 October 2023
Quarter-finals, 1st leg	Matchday 5	16–18 November 2023
Quarter-finals, 2nd leg	Matchday 6	19–21 November 2023
Semi-finals	—N/a	21 March 2024
Third place play-off	—N/a	24 March 2024
Final	—N/a	24 March 2024

== League A ==
=== Group A ===
Pos	Team	Pld	W	D	L	GF	GA	GD	Pts	Qualification or relegation	(Panama)	(Trinidad and Tobago)	(Martinique)	(Guatemala)	(Curaçao)	(El Salvador)
1	Panama	4	3	1	0	9	2	+7	10	Advance to quarter-finals	—	—	3–0	3–0	—	—
2	Trinidad and Tobago	4	3	0	1	10	9	+1	9	Advance to quarter-finals	—	—	—	3–2	1–0	—
3	Martinique	4	2	1	1	2	3	−1	7		—	—	—	—	1–0	1–0
4	Guatemala	4	1	1	2	5	7	−2	4		1–1	—	—	—	—	2–0
5	Curaçao (R)	4	1	0	3	6	7	−1	3	Relegation to League B	1–2	5–3	—	—	—	—
6	El Salvador (R)	4	0	1	3	2	6	−4	1	Relegation to League B	—	2–3	0–0	—	—	—

Source: CONCACAF
Rules for classification: Tiebreakers
(R) Relegated

=== Group B ===
Pos	Team	Pld	W	D	L	GF	GA	GD	Pts	Qualification or relegation	(Jamaica)	(Honduras)	(Suriname)	(Cuba)	(Haiti)	(Grenada)
1	Jamaica	4	3	1	0	10	5	+5	10	Advance to quarter-finals	—	1–0	—	—	2–2	—
2	Honduras	4	2	1	1	8	1	+7	7	Advance to quarter-finals	—	—	—	4–0	—	4–0
3	Suriname	4	1	2	1	6	3	+3	5		—	—	—	—	1–1	4–0
4	Cuba	4	1	2	1	1	4	−3	5		—	0–0	1–0	—	—	—
5	Haiti (R)	4	0	3	1	5	6	−1	3	Relegation to League B	2–3	—	—	0–0	—	—
6	Grenada (R)	4	0	1	3	2	13	−11	1	Relegation to League B	1–4	—	1–1	—	—	—

Source: CONCACAF
Rules for classification: Tiebreakers
(R) Relegated

=== Quarter-finals ===
The quarter-finals pairings were determined based on the CONCACAF Rankings published after the October 2023 FIFA Match Window for the four pre-seeded teams and the group stage results for the winners and runners-up of each group.

Seeded teams
Pos	Team	Rank (Note: CONCACAF rankings (as of 18 October 2023))	Pts
1	Mexico	1	1,967
2	United States	2	1,909
3	Canada	4	1,729
4	Costa Rica	5	1,676

Group stage winners and runners-up
Rank	Team	Pld	W	D	L	GF	GA	GD	Pts
1	Panama	4	3	1	0	9	2	+7	10
2	Jamaica	4	3	1	0	10	5	+5	10
3	Trinidad and Tobago	4	3	0	1	10	9	+1	9
4	Honduras	4	2	1	1	8	1	+7	7

Source: CONCACAF
Rules for classification: Tiebreakers

The match-ups were as follows:

- Quarter-final 1 (QF1): Fourth-ranked seeded team vs. Best-ranked group winner
- Quarter-final 2 (QF2): Third-ranked seeded team vs. Next best-ranked group winner
- Quarter-final 3 (QF3): Second-ranked seeded team vs. Best-ranked group runner-up
- Quarter-final 4 (QF4): First-ranked seeded team vs. Next best-ranked group runner-up

The first legs were played from 16 to 18 November, and the second legs were played on 20 and 21 November 2023.

Team 1	Agg.	Team 2	1st leg	2nd leg
Costa Rica	1–6	Panama	0–3	1–3
Jamaica	4–4 (a)	Canada	1–2	3–2
United States	4–2	Trinidad and Tobago	3–0	1–2
Honduras	2–2 (2–4 p)	Mexico	2–0	0–2 (a.e.t.)

=== Nations League Finals ===
==== Seeding ====
The four teams were ranked based on their results in both legs of the quarter-finals to determine the semi-final matchups. The first seed played the fourth seed and the second seed played the third seed.

Seed	QF	Team	Pld	W	D	L	GF	GA	GD	Pts
1	1	Panama	2	2	0	0	6	1	+5	6
2	3	United States	2	1	0	1	4	2	+2	3
3	2	Jamaica	2	1	0	1	4	4	0	3
4	4	Mexico	2	1	0	1	2	2	0	3

Source: CONCACAF
Rules for classification: Tiebreakers

==== Bracket ====
Semi-finals
21 March – Arlington
Panama	0
Mexico	3
21 March – Arlington
United States (a.e.t.)	3
Jamaica	1

Final
24 March – Arlington
Mexico	0
United States	2
Third place play-off
24 March – Arlington
Panama	0
Jamaica	1

All match times are in EDT (UTC−4) as listed by CONCACAF (local times are in parentheses).

==== Semi-finals ====
21 March 2024
19:00 (18:00 UTC−5)

United States	3–1 (a.e.t.)	Jamaica
Burke 90+6' (o.g.); Wright 96', 109'	Report	Leigh 1'

AT&T Stadium, Arlington
Attendance: 40,926
Referee: Selvin Brown (Honduras)

21 March 2024
22:15 (21:15 UTC−5)

Panama	0–3	Mexico
	Report	Álvarez 40'; Quiñones 43'; Pineda 67'

AT&T Stadium, Arlington
Attendance: 40,926
Referee: Walter López (Guatemala)

==== Third place play-off ====
24 March 2024
18:00 (17:00 UTC−5)

Panama	0–1	Jamaica
	Report	Lembikisa 42'

AT&T Stadium, Arlington
Referee: Tori Penso (United States)

==== Final ====
24 March 2024
21:15 (20:15 UTC−5)

Mexico	0–2	United States
	Report	Adams 45'; Reyna 63'

AT&T Stadium, Arlington
Attendance: 59,471
Referee: Drew Fischer (Canada)

== League B ==
=== Group A ===
Pos	Team	Pld	W	D	L	GF	GA	GD	Pts	Promotion or relegation	(Guadeloupe)	(Saint Lucia)	(Sint Maarten)	(Saint Kitts and Nevis)
1	Guadeloupe (P)	6	5	0	1	16	3	+13	15	Promotion to League A	—	2–0	4–0	5–0
2	Saint Lucia	6	3	1	2	10	6	+4	10		2–1	—	1–2	2–0
3	Sint Maarten	6	2	0	4	6	15	−9	6		0–2	1–5	—	2–3
4	Saint Kitts and Nevis (R)	6	1	1	4	4	12	−8	4	Relegation to League C	1–2	0–0	0–1	—

Source: CONCACAF
Rules for classification: Tiebreakers
(P) Promoted; (R) Relegated

=== Group B ===
Pos	Team	Pld	W	D	L	GF	GA	GD	Pts	Promotion or relegation	(Nicaragua)	(Dominican Republic)	(Montserrat)	(Barbados)
1	Nicaragua (P)	6	5	1	0	17	1	+16	16	Promotion to League A	—	0–0	3–0	5–1
2	Dominican Republic	6	3	1	2	14	6	+8	10		0–2	—	3–0	5–2
3	Montserrat	6	3	0	3	9	14	−5	9		0–3	2–1	—	4–2
4	Barbados (R)	6	0	0	6	7	26	−19	0	Relegation to League C	0–4	0–5	2–3	—

Source: CONCACAF
Rules for classification: Tiebreakers
(P) Promoted; (R) Relegated

=== Group C ===
Pos	Team	Pld	W	D	L	GF	GA	GD	Pts	Promotion or relegation	(French Guiana)	(Saint Vincent and the Grenadines)	(Bermuda)	(Belize)
1	French Guiana (P)	6	3	1	2	10	6	+4	10	Promotion to League A	—	3–2	3–0	0–2
2	Saint Vincent and the Grenadines	6	3	0	3	13	14	−1	9		1–4	—	4–3	3–0
3	Bermuda	6	2	2	2	8	9	−1	8		0–0	3–1	—	1–1
4	Belize (R)	6	2	1	3	5	7	−2	7	Relegation to League C	1–0	1–2	0–1	—

Source: CONCACAF
Rules for classification: Tiebreakers
(P) Promoted; (R) Relegated

=== Group D ===
Pos	Team	Pld	W	D	L	GF	GA	GD	Pts	Promotion or relegation	(Guyana)	(Puerto Rico)	(Antigua and Barbuda)	(The Bahamas)
1	Guyana (P)	5	5	0	0	20	5	+15	15	Promotion to League A	—	3–1	6–0	3–2
2	Puerto Rico	6	4	0	2	22	10	+12	12		1–3	—	5–0	6–1
3	Antigua and Barbuda	6	1	1	4	9	22	−13	4		1–5	2–3	—	2–2
4	Bahamas (R)	5	0	1	4	7	21	−14	1	Relegation to League C	Canc.	1–6	1–4	—

Source: CONCACAF
Rules for classification: Tiebreakers
(P) Promoted; (R) Relegated

== League C ==
=== Group A ===
Pos	Team	Pld	W	D	L	GF	GA	GD	Pts	Promotion	(Collectivity of Saint Martin)	(Bonaire)	(Anguilla)
1	Saint Martin (P)	4	4	0	0	20	1	+19	12	Promotion to League B	—	2–1	8–0
2	Bonaire (P)	4	2	0	2	6	6	0	6	Promotion to League B	0–4	—	2–0
3	Anguilla	4	0	0	4	0	19	−19	0		0–6	0–3	—

Source: CONCACAF
Rules for classification: Tiebreakers
(P) Promoted

=== Group B ===
Pos	Team	Pld	W	D	L	GF	GA	GD	Pts	Promotion	(Aruba)	(Cayman Islands)	(United States Virgin Islands)
1	Aruba (P)	4	4	0	0	14	4	+10	12	Promotion to League B	—	5–1	3–1
2	Cayman Islands	4	1	1	2	6	10	−4	4		1–2	—	2–1
3	U.S. Virgin Islands	4	0	1	3	5	11	−6	1		1–4	2–2	—

Source: CONCACAF
Rules for classification: Tiebreakers
(P) Promoted

=== Group C ===
Pos	Team	Pld	W	D	L	GF	GA	GD	Pts	Promotion	(Dominica)	(British Virgin Islands)	(Turks and Caicos Islands)
1	Dominica (P)	4	3	1	0	8	2	+6	10	Promotion to League B	—	1–1	2–0
2	British Virgin Islands	4	1	2	1	7	6	+1	5		1–2	—	3–1
3	Turks and Caicos Islands	4	0	1	3	3	10	−7	1		0–3	2–2	—

Source: CONCACAF
Rules for classification: Tiebreakers
(P) Promoted

=== Ranking of second-placed teams ===
Pos	Grp	Team	Pld	W	D	L	GF	GA	GD	Pts	Promotion
1	A	Bonaire (P)	4	2	0	2	6	6	0	6	Promotion to League B
2	C	British Virgin Islands	4	1	2	1	7	6	+1	5	
3	B	Cayman Islands	4	1	1	2	6	10	−4	4	

Source: CONCACAF
Rules for classification: Tiebreakers
(P) Promoted

== Top goalscorers ==
League A
Rank	Player	Goals
1	(Jamaica) Shamar Nicholson	5
2	(Curaçao) Rangelo Janga	3
2	(Honduras) Anthony Lozano	3
2	(Jamaica) Bobby De Cordova-Reid	3
2	(Jamaica) Demarai Gray	3
2	(Panama) José Fajardo	3
2	(Trinidad and Tobago) Reon Moore	3

League B
Rank	Player	Goals
1	(Guyana) Omari Glasgow	7
2	(Dominican Republic) Dorny Romero	6
2	(Puerto Rico) Gerald Díaz	6
2	(Puerto Rico) Ricardo Rivera	6
5	(Guadeloupe) Ange-Freddy Plumain	5
6	(Barbados) Thierry Gale	4
6	(Guyana) Kelsey Benjamin	4
6	(Saint Kitts and Nevis) Tiquanny Williams	4

League C
Rank	Player	Goals
1	(Collectivity of Saint Martin) Axel Raga	8
2	(Aruba) Rovien Ostiana	5
2	(Collectivity of Saint Martin) Stanley Segarel	5
4	(British Virgin Islands) Luka Chalwell	3
4	(Turks and Caicos Islands) Billy Forbes	3

Source: CONCACAF.

=== Top Scorer Award ===
An official "Top Scorer Award" was also handed out by CONCACAF, utilising a points system that took into consideration which league the player in question was a part of and weighed their goals accordingly. Each goal scored in League A was awarded 2 points, goals in League B 1.5 points, and goals in League C 1 point. With seven goals for Guyana in League B, Omari Glasgow won the award with a total of 10.5 points.

Rank	Player	Goals	Factor	Points
1	(Guyana) Omari Glasgow	7	1.5	10.5
2	(Jamaica) Shamar Nicholson	5	2	10
3	(Dominican Republic) Dorny Romero	6	1.5	9
3	(Puerto Rico) Gerald Díaz	6	1.5	9
3	(Puerto Rico) Ricardo Rivera	6	1.5	9
