= Troy Jules =

Dominica footballer

Personal information
- Full name: Troy Danyal Jules
- Date of birth: 26 June 2000 (age 26)
- Place of birth: St. John's, Antigua and Barbuda
- Height: 1.68 m (5 ft 6 in)
- Position: Attacking midfielder

Youth career
- –2018: John Hughes

Senior career*
Years	Team	Apps	(Gls)
2018–2019	John Hughes		
2019–2020	Pigotts Bullets		
2020–2021	Tooting Bec	6	(4)
2022–2023	John Hughes		
2023–2024	Mount Pleasant	1	(0)
2024–2025	Trønder-Lyn	7	(11)
2025	Atlético Vega Real	6	(0)

International career^{‡}
2023–	Dominica	15	(7)
- * Club domestic league appearances and goals ‡ National team caps and goals as of 12:09, 5 June 2025 (UTC)

Troy Jules (born 26 June 2000) is an association footballer who last played for Liga Dominicana de Fútbol club Atlético Vega Real and the Dominica national team.

== Club career ==
In 2016 Jules was one of three Antiguans invited to travel to Jamaica to participate in the Digicel Kickstart Academy. He played for John Hughes SC of the First Division in 2019. Following the season, he was given the league's Best Young Player Award. The following season, he moved to Pigotts Bullets of the Antigua and Barbuda Premier Division. Later in 2020 he was invited to a three-month trial in the United Kingdom with Ceda Football Academy with the possibility of joining Bradford AFC. By October 2021 Jules had joined Tooting Bec of England's Southern Counties East Football League. He made six league appearances that season, scoring four goals. He made an additional appearance in the Gordon Worsfold Senior Cup in which he scored a brace in a 6–1 Second Round victory over Junction Elite FC.

In summer 2021, it was announced that Jules and fellow-Antiguan Amali Colbourne would join South Bend Lions FC of the USL League Two in the United States for the 2022 season following a successful trial. The trial opportunity arose following an extended training period and impressive combine performances in the United Kingdom in 2019. Because the duo could not fly to Indiana because of the ongoing COVID-19 pandemic, the trial took place at the facilities of Kettering Town in August 2021. Despite the move being announced, neither player joined the club's roster that season.

By 2023 Hughes had returned to Antigua and former club John Hughes SC. He scored a hat trick in the promotion/relegation playoffs to help the club secure promotion back to the Premier Division. In July of that year it was announced that Jules had signed a two-year contract with Mount Pleasant FA of the Jamaican Premier League. At the time, the club was the ranked third in the Caribbean and best in Jamaica according to CONCACAF ratings.

In March 2024, Jules joined Norwegian Fourth Division club Trønder-Lyn IL on a two-year contract.

== International career ==
Jules represented Antigua and Barbuda, the country of his birth, at the youth level. In September 2023 he was called up to the Dominica national football team for the first-time for a 2023–24 CONCACAF Nations League C match against the Turks and Caicos. He was one of four overseas-based players in the squad. Jules went on to make his debut in the match, scoring two goals, including the game-winner, in Dominica's eventual 3–0 victory. For his performance, Jules was named to the League C Best XI for the matchday.

=== International goals ===
Scores and results list Dominica's goal tally first.

No.	Date	Venue	Opponent	Score	Result	Competition
1.	12 September 2023	TCIFA National Academy, Providenciales, Turks and Caicos	Turks and Caicos Islands	1–0	3–0	2023–24 CONCACAF Nations League C
2.	12 September 2023	TCIFA National Academy, Providenciales, Turks and Caicos	Turks and Caicos Islands	2–0	3–0	2023–24 CONCACAF Nations League C
3.	9 June 2024	Windsor Park, Roseau, Dominica	Jamaica	2–3	2–3	2026 FIFA World Cup qualification
4.	15 October 2024	Bermuda National Stadium, Devonshire Parish, Bermuda	Bermuda	1–2	2–3	2024–25 CONCACAF Nations League B
5.	4 June 2025	Windsor Park, Roseau, Dominica	British Virgin Islands	2–0	3–0	2026 FIFA World Cup qualification
6.	12 November 2025	SKNFA Technical Center, Basseterre, Saint Kitts and Nevis	Saint Martin	1–0	1–2	2025–26 CONCACAF Series
7.	1 October 2026	Mayagüez Athletics Stadium, Mayagüez	Guyana	1–3	1–5	2026–27 CONCACAF Nations League B
Last updated 7 October 2026

=== International career statistics ===
As of match played 14 November 2025.

Dominica national team
2023	3	2
2024	8	2
2025	3	2
Total	14	6
