= Dan Neville =

Dan Neville may refer to:

- Dan Neville (politician) (born 1946), Irish Fine Gael politician
- Dan Neville (football coach)
- Danny Neville, American college basketball coach
