= Patrick Mitchell =

Patrick Mitchell may refer to:

- Patrick Mitchell (priest) English Anglican priest
- Patrick Mitchell (football manager), British Virgin Islands football manager
- Paddy Mitchell, bank robber
