= British Virgin Islands national football team =

British Virgin Islands
- Nickname: The Nature Boys
- Association: British Virgin Islands Football Association (BVIFA)
- Confederation: CONCACAF (North America)
- Sub-confederation: CFU (Caribbean)
- Head coach: David Pérez
- Captain: T'Sharne Gallimore
- Most caps: Kristian Javier (46)
- Top scorer: Tyler Forbes (7)
- Home stadium: A.O. Shirley Recreation Ground
- FIFA code: VGB
First colours	Second colours

FIFA ranking
- Current: 209 (7 October 2026)
- Highest: 160 (March 2000, August–November 2002)
- Lowest: 209 (March 2022, June 2026)

First international
- Anguilla 0–1 British Virgin Islands (The Valley, Anguilla; October 1985)

Biggest win
- British Virgin Islands 6–0 Anguilla (Marigot, Saint Martin; 28 March 1990); Bahamas 0–6 British Virgin Islands (George Town, Cayman Islands; 15 November 2025)

Biggest defeat
- Dominican Republic 17–0 British Virgin Islands (San Cristóbal, Dominican Republic; 14 October 2010)

The British Virgin Islands national football team represents the British Virgin Islands, a British overseas territory in men's international football, and is governed by the British Virgin Islands Football Association, the governing body for football in the British Virgin Islands founded in 1974. It has been a full member of FIFA and CONCACAF since 1996, and is also a member of CFU in the Caribbean Zone.

The British Virgin Islands has never qualified for the FIFA World Cup and the CONCACAF Gold Cup, but has participated five times in League C of the CONCACAF Nations League.

The British Virgin Islands' debut in international competitions was in the 1989 Caribbean Cup qualifying tournament, and its first appearance in World Cup qualifiers was for 2002 qualification. The team's first victory was in 1985 by defeating Anguilla 1–0.

== History ==
Early football games in the British Virgin Islands were between British Royal Navy crew, and expatriates. In 1968, the British Virgin Islands team was founded by a team of Royal Engineers, and soon after, in 1974 the British Virgin Islands Football Association was founded. The former Tottenham, Chelsea and Porto manager, Portuguese André Villas-Boas had his first job as Technical Director of the national team British Virgin Islands in 2000 and 2001.

=== World Cup qualification ===
In the qualifying rounds for the 2006 World Cup were drawn against St Lucia, and they were eliminated 10–0 on aggregate.

In the qualifying rounds for the 2010 World Cup they were paired with the Bahamas. They lost on the away goals rule after a 3–3 draw over both legs. Both matches were actually played in the Bahamas, but British Virgin Islands were designated as the home team in the second match, which ended 2–2. Despite going out of the competition in the first qualifying round, the British Virgin Islands were the only side to enter the 2010 FIFA World Cup to remain unbeaten through qualification and the finals tournament (although New Zealand was undefeated in the finals tournament, they did lose a game in qualification.)

In the qualifying rounds for the 2014 FIFA World Cup they were in the unusual position of being favorites to win their two-legged tie against neighbors U.S. Virgin Islands. However, after losing the first leg 2–0 and the return leg 2–1, the British Virgin Islands once again failed to advance to the next round.

The 2018 FIFA World Cup qualifying rounds saw British Virgin Islands take on Dominica with both legs taking place in Dominica, with the first leg acting as BVI's 'home ground' due to the away goal ruling. Despite taking the lead twice, the Islanders fell to a 3–2 defeat at 'home' and drew 0–0 away, meaning that once again first round qualification remained elusive.

The 2022 FIFA World Cup qualifying rounds saw British Virgin Islands again knocked out in the first round, having lost all four of their group matches without scoring a goal.

At the commencement of 2026 FIFA World Cup qualification, BVI advanced beyond the first round of qualifying for the first time in their history after beating the U.S. Virgin Islands 1–1 on aggregate after penalties. In the second round, they were drawn into Group E with Guatemala, Dominica, Jamaica and the Dominican Republic and finished bottom without even scoring a single goal.

== Results and fixtures ==
The following is a list of match results in the last 12 months, as well as any future matches that have been scheduled.

Win Draw Loss Fixture

=== 2025 ===
12 November 2025–26 CONCACAF Series	Cayman Islands	1–2	British Virgin Islands	George Town, Cayman Islands
19:00 UTC−5				Stadium: Truman Bodden Sports Complex

15 November 2025–26 CONCACAF Series	Bahamas	0–6	British Virgin Islands	George Town, Cayman Islands
16:30 UTC−5				Stadium: Truman Bodden Sports Complex

=== 2026 ===
26 March 2025–26 CONCACAF Series	Cayman Islands	1–1	British Virgin Islands	George Town, Cayman Islands
19:00 UTC−5	Silburn 7'	Report	Splatt 20'	Stadium: Truman Bodden Sports Complex; Referee: Alexi Perry (Jamaica)

29 March 2025–26 CONCACAF Series	British Virgin Islands	4–0	Anguilla	George Town, Cayman Islands
16:30 UTC−5	T. Forbes 5', 39'; Chalwell 32' (pen.); Lacey 78'	Report		Stadium: Truman Bodden Sports Complex; Referee: Sergio Rozenhout (Suriname)

3 June 2026 Friendly	Gibraltar	4–0	British Virgin Islands	Europa Point, Gibraltar
19:00	Lacey 10' (o.g.); J. Scanlon 32', 64'; Mason 42'	UEFA; FIFA		Stadium: Europa Point Stadium; Referee: Antoine Chiaramonti (Andorra)

6 June 2026 Friendly	Bonaire	0–2	British Virgin Islands	Malaga, Spain
19:00			Bertie; Chalwell

26 September 2026 2026–27 CONCACAF Nations League C	Montserrat	3–0	British Virgin Islands	Providenciales, Turks and Caicos Islands
15:00 UTC−4	Barzey 58'; Taylor 67', 71'	Report		Stadium: TCIFA National Academy; Attendance: 120; Referee: Evens Julmis (Bahamas)

29 September 2026 2026–27 CONCACAF Nations League C	British Virgin Islands	0–3	Turks and Caicos Islands	Providenciales, Turks and Caicos Islands
15:00 UTC−4		Report	Forbes 9', 74'; Paul 52'	Stadium: TCIFA National Academy; Attendance: 152; Referee: César Nolasco (El Salvador)

1 October 2026 2026–27 CONCACAF Nations League C	British Virgin Islands	v	Montserrat	Providenciales, Turks and Caicos Islands
15:00 UTC−4		Report		Stadium: TCIFA National Academy

4 October 2026 2026–27 CONCACAF Nations League C	Turks and Caicos Islands	v	British Virgin Islands	Providenciales, Turks and Caicos Islands
15:00 UTC−4		Report		Stadium: TCIFA National Academy

== Coaching history ==
- (England) Gary White (1998–1999)
- (British Virgin Islands) Gregory Grant (2000)
- (United States) William H. Moravek (2000–01)
- (British Virgin Islands) Patrick Mitchell (2002)
- (Jamaica) Michael Tulloch (2004)
- (British Virgin Islands) Ben Davies (2004)
- (British Virgin Islands) Patrick Mitchell (2008)
- (British Virgin Islands) Avondale Williams (2008–2018)
- (Republic of Ireland) John Reilly (2018–2020)
- (England) Dan Neville (2021)
- (England) Chris Kiwomya (2021–2025)
- (Spain) David Pérez (2025–)

== Players ==
=== Current squad ===
The following players were called up for the friendlies against Gibraltar and Bonaire on 3 and 6 June 2026.

Caps and goals correct as of 3 June 2026, after match against Gibraltar.

No.	Pos.	Player	Date of birth (age)	Caps	Goals	Club
1	GK	Toby Whiteside	24 April 2008 (age 18)	3	0	(The Football Association) Eastbourne Borough
18	GK	Harry Foden	26 August 2006 (age 20)	2	0	(The Football Association) Portland United
3	DF	Joshua Bertie	9 October 1996 (age 30)	23	1	(The Football Association) Downton
13	DF	Ikyjah Williams	14 April 2003 (age 23)	22	0	(British Virgin Islands Football Association) Virgin Gorda United
15	DF	Jaden Abrams	20 April 2007 (age 19)	19	0	(British Virgin Islands Football Association) Virgin Gorda United
4	DF	T'Khoi Morton	10 October 2007 (age 19)	11	0	(British Virgin Islands Football Association) Virgin Gorda United
14	DF	Quelahni Nickie	19 February 2004 (age 22)	8	0	(British Virgin Islands Football Association) Virgin Gorda United
5	DF	Momchil Yordanov	28 February 2007 (age 19)	2	0	(The Football Association) Lancing
2	MF	Kristian Javier	6 April 1996 (age 30)	34	2	(Antigua and Barbuda Football Association) Pigotts Bullets
6	MF	T'Sharne Gallimore	20 August 2000 (age 26)	28	1	(The Football Association) Bedford Town
8	MF	Luka Chalwell	11 April 2004 (age 22)	27	5	(The Football Association) Bishop's Stortford
12	MF	William Green	5 September 1997 (age 29)	22	0	(British Virgin Islands Football Association) Islanders FC
7	MF	Joel Mars	16 February 2007 (age 19)	11	0	(British Virgin Islands Football Association) Virgin Gorda United
21	MF	Alejandro Santos	23 November 2003 (age 22)	6	0	(British Virgin Islands Football Association) Wolues
10	MF	Rush Broderick	24 July 2007 (age 19)	1	0	(British Virgin Islands Football Association) Wolues
20	FW	Tyler Forbes	18 April 2002 (age 24)	33	4	(The Football Association) Tilbury
11	FW	Johari Lacey	15 December 2006 (age 19)	16	1	(British Virgin Islands Football Association) Rebels FC
9	FW	Javaun Splatt	18 February 2001 (age 25)	8	5	(The Football Association) Margate
16	FW	Adrian Padilla	15 February 2006 (age 20)	7	0	(Royal Spanish Football Federation) Trival Valderas
17	FW	Decoi Prince	8 March 2007 (age 19)	5	0	(British Virgin Islands Football Association) Virgin Gorda United

=== Recent call-ups ===
Pos.	Player	Date of birth (age)	Caps	Goals	Club	Latest call-up
GK	Frankie Beckles	11 March 2007 (age 19)	10	0	(England) AFC Croydon Athletic	v. Anguilla, 30 March 2026
DF	Jerry Wiltshire	4 February 1996 (age 30)	17	1	(England) Leatherhead	v. Anguilla, 30 March 2026
DF	Charles Medway	2 June 2002 (age 24)	6	0	(England) Bournemouth F.C.	v. Anguilla, 30 March 2026
MF	Carson Price	14 March 2001 (age 25)	6	0	(United States) Incarnate Word Cardinals	v. Anguilla, 30 March 2026
MF	Marc Tan	26 March 2009 (age 17)	1	0	(British Virgin Islands) Rebels FC	v. Anguilla, 30 March 2026
INJ = Withdrew due to injury; PRE = Preliminary squad; TRA = Training player; WD = Withdrew (non-injury); RET = Retired

== Player records ==
As of 6 June 2026
Players in bold are still active with British Virgin Islands.

=== Most appearances ===
Rank	Player	Caps	Goals	Career
1	Kristian Javier	34	2	2016–present
2	Tyler Forbes	33	4	2018–present
3	Troy Caesar	29	3	2010–present
4	T'Sharne Gallimore	28	1	2018–present
5	Luka Chalwell	27	5	2021–present
6	Miguel Marshall	26	0	2019–present
7	Joshua Bertie	23	1	2018–present
8	Robert Green	22	0	2018–present
8	Ikyjah Williams	22	0	2021–present
10	Carlos Septus	19	1	2011–present
10	Jaden Abrams	19	0	2023–present

=== Top goalscorers ===
Rank	Player	Goals	Caps	Ratio	Career
1	**Javaun Splatt**	5	8	0.63	2025–present
1	Avondale Williams	5	14	0.36	2000–2012
1	**Luka Chalwell**	5	27	0.19	2021–present
4	**Tyler Forbes**	4	33	0.12	2018–present
5	Jairo Morris	3	5	0.6	2004
5	**Troy Caesar**	3	37	0.08	2010–present
7	Henroy Mitchell	2	1	2	2010
7	Michael Huggins	2	2	1	2002
7	Peterson Azille	2	6	0.33	2000–2004
7	Garret Ferron	2	6	0.33	2000–2004
7	Venton James	2	8	0.25	2004–2008
7	Rohan Lennon	2	13	0.15	2000–2008
7	**Kristian Javier**	2	34	0.06	2016–present

== Competitive record ==
=== FIFA World Cup ===
FIFA World Cup record										Qualification record					
Year	Round	Pos.	Pld	W	D	L	GF	GA	Squad	Pld	W	D	L	GF	GA
1930 to 1998	Not a FIFA member									Not a FIFA member					
(South Korea) (Japan) 2002	Did not qualify									2	0	0	2	1	14
(Germany) 2006	Did not qualify									2	0	0	2	0	10
(South Africa) 2010	Did not qualify									2	0	2	0	3	3
(Brazil) 2014	Did not qualify									2	0	0	2	1	4
(Russia) 2018	Did not qualify									2	0	1	1	2	3
(Qatar) 2022	Did not qualify									4	0	0	4	0	19
(Canada) (Mexico) (United States) 2026	Did not qualify									6	0	2	4	1	12
(Morocco) (Portugal) (Spain) 2030	To be determined									To be determined					
(Saudi Arabia) 2034	To be determined									To be determined					
Total	—	0/7	—							20	0	5	15	8	65

=== CONCACAF Gold Cup ===
CONCACAF Championship / Gold Cup record
Year	Round	Pos.	Pld	W	D	L	GF	GA	Squad
1963 to 1993	Not a CONCACAF member								
(United States) 1996	Withdrew								
1998 to 2005	Did not qualify								
(United States) 2007	Withdrew								
2009 to 2027	Did not qualify								
Total	—	0/14	—						

=== CONCACAF Nations League ===
CONCACAF Nations League record
League phase											Final phase									
Season	League	Group	Pos.	Pld	W	D	L	GF	GA	P/R	Finals	Round	Pos.	Pld	W	D	L	GF	GA	Squad
2019–20	C	B	12th	4	0	0	4	5	15	Same position	(United States) 2021	Ineligible								
2022–23	C	D	13th	4	0	2	2	3	11	Same position	(United States) 2023	Ineligible								
2023–24	C	B	5th	4	1	2	1	7	6	Same position	(United States) 2024	Ineligible								
2024–25	C	C	9th	4	0	0	4	1	7	Same position	(United States) 2025	Ineligible								
2026–27	C	A	8th	4	0	0	4	0	11	Same position	2027 (Note: Since the 2026–27 CONCACAF Nations League, a final phase has been held for each league.)	Did not qualify								
Total				20	1	4	15	16	50	—	Total	—								

CONCACAF Nations League history
First match	Bonaire 4–2 British Virgin Islands (6 September 2019; Willemstad, Curaçao)
Biggest Win	British Virgin Islands 3–1 Turks and Caicos Islands (9 September 2023; Road Town, British Virgin Islands)
Biggest Defeat	Puerto Rico 6–0 British Virgin Islands (12 June 2022; Mayagüez, Puerto Rico)
Best Result	League C (2023–24)
Worst Result	League C (2026–27)

=== Caribbean Cup ===
CFU Championship / Caribbean Cup record
Year	Round	Pos.	Pld	W	D	L	GF	GA
1978 to 1988	Not a CFU member							
1989 to 1994	Did not qualify							
(Cayman Islands) (Jamaica) 1995	Withdrew							
(Trinidad and Tobago) 1996	Did not participate							
1997 to 2005	Did not qualify							
(Trinidad and Tobago) 2007	Withdrew							
2008 to 2017	Did not qualify							
Total	—	0/16	—					

== Honours ==
=== Friendly / Unofficial ===
- Leeward Islands Tournament (1): 1986
