= Keishean Francois =

Grenadian footballer (born 2003)

Personal information
- Date of birth: 17 August 2003 (age 23)
- Place of birth: White Rock, British Columbia, Canada
- Height: 1.80 m (5 ft 11 in)
- Position: Forward

Youth career
- –2019: Coastal FC
- 2019–2022: Vancouver Whitecaps

College career
| Years | Team | Apps | (Gls) |
| 2022–2023 | Trinity Western Spartans | 27 | (2) |
| 2024–2026 | Douglas Royals | 18 | (2) |

Senior career*
| Years | Team | Apps | (Gls) |
| 2022 | Whitecaps FC Academy | 2 | (0) |
| 2023 | Unity FC | 10 | (2) |
| 2024 | North Surrey FC | | |
| 2026– | Whitecaps FC Academy | 1 | (0) |

International career^{‡}
| 2025– | Grenada | 2 | (2) |
- * Club domestic league appearances and goals as of April 7, 2026 ‡ National team caps and goals as of 01:39, 5 June 2025 (UTC)

Keishean Francois (born 17 August 2003) is a footballer who plays for Whitecaps FC Academy in the British Columbia Premier League. Born in Canada, he represents Grenada at international level.

== Club career ==
As a youth, Francois played for Coastal FC of the BC Soccer Premier League since at least 2016 when he competed with the club at the under-13 level. In 2019, he joined the academy of Major League Soccer club Vancouver Whitecaps FC. He played for the team's youth teams in the League1 British Columbia and was with the club during the league's inaugural season. In 2021, he took part in the first-team's training camp in Vancouver and Salt Lake City ahead of the 2021 Major League Soccer season.

Francois left the Whitecaps Academy in 2022 to play college soccer for U Sports team Trinity Western Spartans. While in college, he also returned to the League1 British Columbia with Unity FC. He was named the club's MVP multiple times during the 2023 and 2024 seasons. After two seasons in which he made twenty-seven appearances and scored two goals for the Spartans, Francois transferred to Douglas College to play for its soccer team, the Royals, for the 2024 season. While playing for the Royals, the forward also competed with North Surrey FC of the Fraser Valley Soccer League.

In 2026, he returned to played for the Whitecaps FC Academy in the British Columbia Premier League (re-branded from League1 British Columbia).

== International career ==
Born in Canada, Francois was included in a training camp with the Grenada national team in Florida in 2022. He was called up to the squad again for a friendly against Anguilla in late May 2025 and for 2026 FIFA World Cup qualifiers against Bahamas and Saint Kitts and Nevis the following month. He made international his debut on 31 May 2025, opening the scoring with what would become the game-winning goal against Anguilla.

=== International goals ===
Scores and results list Grenada's goal tally first.

| No. | Date | Venue | Opponent | Score | Result | Competition |
|---|---|---|---|---|---|---|
| 1. | 31 May 2025 | Kirani James Athletic Stadium, St. George's, Grenada | Anguilla | 1–0 | 2–0 | Friendly |
| 2. | 4 June 2025 | Kirani James Athletic Stadium, St. George's, Grenada | Bahamas | 3–0 | 6–0 | 2026 FIFA World Cup qualification |
Last updated 4 June 2025

=== International career statistics ===
As of match played 5 June 2025.

Grenada
| Year | Apps | Goals |
|---|---|---|
| 2025 | 2 | 2 |
| Total | 2 | 2 |
