= Ginel Ronde =

Bonaire footballer

Ginèl Ronde
Personal information
- Full name: Ginèl Roland Alfred Ronde
- Date of birth: 8 August 2002 (age 24)
- Place of birth: Willemstad, Netherlands Antilles
- Height: 1.83 m (6 ft 0 in)
- Position: Forward

Team information
- Current team: Castelbuono

Youth career
- 2008–2015: Nort Saliña Kids Bonaire
- 2015-2017: Buitenboys Almere
- 2017-2022: AVV Zeeburgia

Senior career*
Years	Team	Apps	(Gls)
2022–2023	Zeeburgia	0	(0)
2022	→ SW Düren (loan)	14	(9)
2023	MSV Neuruppin	11	(1)
2024	Xgħajra Tornados	3	(1)
2024	Real Rincon	6	(3)
2024–	Castelbuono	14	(3)

International career^{‡}
2023–	Bonaire	6	(1)
- * Club domestic league appearances and goals as of 15:07, 6 September 2024 (UTC) ‡ National team caps and goals as of 15:07, 6 September 2024 (UTC)

Ginèl Ronde (born 8 August 2002) is a Bonairean footballer who currently plays for Supergiovane Castelbuono and the Bonaire national team.

== Club career ==
Ginèl Ronde started his sporting career with the youth team Nort Saliña Kids on his native island Bonaire. In 2015 he moved to the Netherlands with his parents and played for Buitenboys Almere. After two seasons Ronde joined the academy of AVV Zeeburgia in 2017. In January 2022, he went on a six-month loan to SW Düren of Germany's Kreisliga A Düren. During his time with the club, Ronde scored nine goals in fourteen matches.

In January 2023, the player returned to Germany, signing for MSV Neuruppin of the NOFV-Oberliga Nord, the fifth tier of football in the country. Soon thereafter, he appeared in a pre-season friendly against SV Babelsberg 03. He was then part of the squad that suffered a disappointing loss to FSV 63 Luckenwalde in the quarter-finals of the 2023 Brandenburg Cup. He scored his first league goal for the club on 12 April 2023 in a 1–1 draw with Optik Rathenow.

By February 2024, Ronde had joined Xgħajra Tornados F.C. of the Maltese National Amateur League. That month, he scored in a his first goal for the club in a 2–0 victory over Mellieħa. Later that year, Ronde joined SV Real Rincon of the Bonaire League. Over his brief time with the club, he scored three goals in six league matches.

In September 2024, it was announced that Ronde had joined ASD Supergiovane Castelbuono of the Italian Eccellenza Sicily.

== International career ==
Ginèl Ronde was a member of Bonaires U-11 and skipper of the U-13 international youth team. Ronde made his senior international debut for Bonaire on 12 October 2023 in a 2023–24 CONCACAF Nations League C match against Anguilla. Ten minutes into the match, he scored his first international goal in the eventual 2–0 victory.

=== International goals ===
Scores and results list Bonaire's goal tally first.

No.	Date	Venue	Opponent	Score	Result	Competition
1	12 October 2023	Stadion Antonio Trenidat, Rincon, Bonaire	Anguilla	1–0	2–0	2023–24 CONCACAF Nations League C
Last updated 12 October 2023

=== International career statistics ===
As of match played 20 March 2024.

Bonaire
Year	Apps	Goals
2023	3	1
2024	3	0
Total	6	1
