= Devonte Richards =

Barbadian footballer

Personal information
- Full name: Devonte Marlon Richards Jr.
- Date of birth: 27 September 2002 (age 24)
- Place of birth: Bridgetown, Barbados
- Position: Forward

Team information
- Current team: Spartanii Sportul
- Number: 9

Youth career
- –2021: UWI Blackbirds

College career
Years	Team	Apps	(Gls)
2021–2023	Feather River Golden Eagles	38	(30)
2023–2025	Central Arkansas Bears	52	(15)

Senior career*
Years	Team	Apps	(Gls)
2024	Houston FC	9	(3)
2025	Dothan United	11	(1)
2026–	Spartanii Sportul	13	(6)

International career^{‡}
2021–	Barbados	8	(1)
- * Club domestic league appearances and goals as of 13:46, 19 November 2026 (UTC) ‡ National team caps and goals as of 13:46, 19 November 2026 (UTC)

Devonte Richards (born 27 September 2002) is a Barbadian footballer who plays as a forward for Moldovan Liga 1 club Spartanii Sportul and the Barbados national team.

== Club career ==
Beginning in 2021, Richards played college soccer in the United States for the Golden Eagles of Feather River College. In 2022, he was named the Golden Valley Conference Offensive Player of the Year and was a California all-region selection. In total, he made thirty-eight appearances for the team, scoring thirty goals, during his two seasons with the Golden Eagles. Richards then transferred to the University of Central Arkansas to play for its Bears of the NCAA Division I. He made fifty-two appearances over the next three seasons, scoring fifteen goals, before graduating in 2025. He earned All-Atlantic Sun Conference honors in 2024 and again as a senior in 2025.

During the college soccer offseason, Richards played semi-professionally for several clubs. In 2022, he played for AFC South Bay of the NISA Nation. He debuted for the club, and made his US club debut, in a NISA Independent Cup match against Soul2Sole FC on 12 July. In the 88th minute, he scored the eventual game-winner of the 4–3 victory which saw the club advance to the next round to compete against professional club Capo FC. The following summer he played for Side FC 92 FC of the United Premier Soccer League. In summer 2024, he joined Houston FC of the USL League Two. He scored three goals in nine matches during the 2024 season. For the 2025 USL League Two season, Richards joined Dothan United. He came in as a substitute during the opening match of the season and quickly established himself in the starting lineup. When he was called up to the Barbados national team in May 2025, he became the first Dothan United player to receive an international call-up. In total, Richards made eleven appearances for the club that season, scoring one goal.

Richards signed his first professional contract in March 2026, joining CSF Spartanii Sportul of Liga 1 in Moldova. Prior to signing his contract, he appeared for the club in the Winter Cup and scored in a 2–1 victory over FC Oguz Comrat. He went on to score in his league debut, a 2–2 draw with FC Florești on 14 March 2026, to open the second half of the 2026–27 season.

== International career ==
Richards made his senior international debut on 8 June 2021 in a 2022 FIFA World Cup qualification match against Dominica.

=== International goals ===
Scores and results list Barbados's goal tally first.

No.	Date	Venue	Opponent	Score	Result	Competition
1.	10 June 2025	Daren Sammy Cricket Ground, Gros Islet, Saint Lucia	Saint Lucia	1–0	1–2	2026 FIFA World Cup qualification
Last updated 28 August 2026

=== International career statistics ===
As of match played 10 June 2026

Barbados
Year	Apps	Goals
2021	1	0
2022	1	0
2023	2	0
2024	2	0
2025	2	1
Total	8	1
