= Quinn Farrell =

United States Virgin Islander soccer player (born 2002)

Personal information
- Date of birth: September 26, 2002 (age 24)
- Place of birth: Saint Thomas, U.S. Virgin Islands
- Height: 1.82 m (6 ft 0 in)
- Position: Defender

College career
Years	Team	Apps	(Gls)
2020–2022	LSU Eunice Bengals		

International career^{‡}
2018	United States Virgin Islands U20	5	(0)
2021–	United States Virgin Islands	17	(2)
- ‡ National team caps and goals as of June 23, 2026

Quinn Farrell (born September 26, 2002) is a United States Virgin Islands soccer player who plays as a defender for United States Virgin Islands national team.

== Career ==
Farrell was part of national under-20 team at 2018 CONCACAF U-20 Championship. In March 2021, he received maiden call-up to senior team. He made his senior team debut on March 21, 2021, in a goalless friendly draw against Anguilla.

== Personal life ==
Born in United States Virgin Islands, Farrell relocated to mainland United States in 2017 after Hurricane Irma and Hurricane Maria hit the islands. He is the younger brother of fellow national team player Grant Farrell.

== Career statistics ==
=== International ===
As of March 28, 2026

National team	Year	Apps	Goals
United States Virgin Islands	2021	2	0
United States Virgin Islands	2022	2	0
United States Virgin Islands	2023	6	2
United States Virgin Islands	2024	2	0
United States Virgin Islands	2025	3	0
United States Virgin Islands	2026	2	0
Total		17	2

Scores and results list United States Virgin Islands' goal tally first, score column indicates score after each Farrell goal.

List of international goals scored by Quinn Farrell
No.	Date	Venue	Opponent	Score	Result	Competition
1	October 14, 2023	Trinidad Stadium, Oranjestad, Aruba	Aruba	1–2	1–3	2023–24 CONCACAF Nations League C
2	November 16, 2023	Bethlehem Soccer Stadium, Christiansted, United States Virgin Islands	Aruba	1–2	1–4	2023–24 CONCACAF Nations League C
