= David Pérez (football manager) =

Spanish football manager

Personal information
- Full name: David Pérez Asensio
- Date of birth: 27 September 1982 (age 44)
- Place of birth: Madrid, Spain

Managerial career
- Years: Team
- 2009–2011: UD Móstoles (youth)
- 2011–2013: Ciudad de Móstoles (youth)
- 2013–2018: Móstoles URJC (youth)
- 2018–2019: Anhui Titi Sport
- 2019–2021: Alcorcón (youth)
- 2021–2022: Verdes
- 2022–2024: Belize
- 2025–: British Virgin Islands

David Pérez Asensio (born 27 September 1982) is a Spanish football manager, previously managed the Belize national team and Verdes FC.

== Managerial career ==
Born in Madrid, Pérez's first foray into management was with Preferente de Madrid side Móstoles URJC in 2012. In the 2013–14 season, Pérez and his Móstoles side achieved promotion to the Tercera División. In 2018, Pérez moved to China to manage Anhui Titi Sport, staying in the country until mid-2019. Ahead of the 2019–20 season, Pérez returned to Spain to work as a youth coach for Alcorcón.

In July 2021, Pérez was confirmed as manager of Premier League of Belize club Verdes. In January 2022, Pérez was announced as manager of the Belize national team. Following his appointment, Pérez confirmed he would continue as Verdes manager alongside his national team duties.
