= Kristian Javier =

British Virgin Islander footballer

Personal information
- Full name: Kristian Francisco Javier Samuel
- Date of birth: 6 April 1996 (age 30)
- Place of birth: Charlotte Amalie, U.S. Virgin Islands
- Height: 1.78 m (5 ft 10 in)
- Position: Midfielder

Team information
- Current team: Pigotts Bullets

Youth career
- –2013: Brussels

College career
Years	Team	Apps	(Gls)
2014–2015	LaGrange Panthers	27	(5)

Senior career*
Years	Team	Apps	(Gls)
2016	Peachtree City MOBA	1	(0)
2018	Peachtree City MOBA	2	(0)
2019–2020	Lionsbridge		
2020–2024	AC Commonwealth		
2024	Grove Soccer United		
2024–	Pigotts Bullets		

International career^{‡}
- United States U18
- United States U20
2016–	British Virgin Islands	28	(1)
- * Club domestic league appearances and goals as of 10:17, 21 March 2025 (UTC) ‡ National team caps and goals as of 21 March 2025

Kristian Francisco Javier Samuel (born 6 April 1996) is a footballer who currently plays as a midfielder for Pigotts Bullets in the Antigua and Barbuda Premier Division. Born in the U.S. Virgin Islands, he represents the British Virgin Islands national team.

== Early life ==
Javier was born in Charlotte Amalie, U.S. Virgin Islands and raised in Atlanta, Georgia, United States to a Dominican Republic father and a British Virgin Islander mother.

== College and club career ==
Javier played soccer for Brussels at the DODDS (Department of Defense Dependents Schools) European Championships, where he was named boys' soccer athlete of the year. He then moved back to America to play soccer at the LaGrange College for two seasons before leaving for Premier Development League side Peachtree City MOBA, where he played one game in the 2016 season.

== International career ==
Javier made his senior international debut in a 3–0 away loss to Martinique in qualification for the 2017 Caribbean Cup.

== Career statistics ==
=== Club ===
As of 26 March 2021.

Club	Season	League			Cup		Other		Total	
Club	Season	Division	Apps	Goals	Apps	Goals	Apps	Goals	Apps	Goals
Peachtree City MOBA	2016	PDL	1	0	0	0	0	0	1	0
Peachtree City MOBA	2018	PDL	2	0	0	0	0	0	2	0
Peachtree City MOBA	Total		3	0	0	0	0	0	3	0
Lionsbridge	2019	USL League Two	0	0	0	0	0	0	0	0
Lionsbridge	2020	USL League Two	0	0	0	0	0	0	0	0
Lionsbridge	Total		0	0	0	0	0	0	0	0
Career total			3	0	0	0	0	0	3	0

=== International ===
As of match played 12 October 2024

National team	Year	Apps	Goals
British Virgin Islands	2016	2	0
British Virgin Islands	2018	2	0
British Virgin Islands	2019	6	0
British Virgin Islands	2021	4	0
British Virgin Islands	2022	4	0
British Virgin Islands	2023	4	0
British Virgin Islands	2024	6	1
Total		28	1

As of match played 9 October 2024
British Virgin Islands score listed first, score column indicates score after each Javier goal.

List of international goals scored by Kristian Javier
No.	Date	Venue	Cap	Opponent	Score	Result	Competition	Ref.
1	9 October 2024	Warner Park Sporting Complex, Basseterre, St. Kitts & Nevis	27	Saint Kitts and Nevis	1–2	1–3	2024–25 CONCACAF Nations League	
