= Diederick Luydens =

Aruban footballer (born 1999)

Personal information
- Full name: Diederick Luigi Luydens
- Date of birth: 18 February 1999 (age 27)
- Place of birth: Zoetermeer, Netherlands
- Position: Defender

Team information
- Current team: SV Dakota

Youth career
- DWO Zoetermeer
- Sparta Rotterdam

Senior career*
Years	Team	Apps	(Gls)
2016–2019	Jong Sparta	56	(0)
2019–2020	Alphense Boys	1	(0)
2020	Åtvidabergs FF		
2020–2022	Prespa Birlik		
2022	VfR Mannheim	3	(0)
2022–2023	SC Feyenoord		
2023–2024	SV DSO		
2024–	SV Dakota		

International career^{‡}
2021–	Aruba	13	(2)
- * Club domestic league appearances and goals as of 1 June 2025 ‡ National team caps and goals as of 8 June 2025

Diederick Luigi Luydens (born 18 February 1999) is a footballer who plays as a defender for Aruban Division di Honor club SV Dakota. Born in the Netherlands, he plays for the Aruba national team.

== Club career ==
Luydens started his youth career with DWO Zoetermeer, where he was scouted by Ajax and Sparta Rotterdam. Even though he did trials at Ajax with Matthijs de Ligt and Justin Kluivert, he chose to join Sparta. He played 56 matches for Jong Sparta in Tweede Divisie, before his contract with the club expired in June 2019.

In November 2019, Luydens joined Alphense Boys after spending few months as a free agent. In February 2020, he moved to Swedish fourth division club Åtvidabergs FF.

== International career ==
Born in the Netherlands, Luydens represent Aruba at international level. He was part of under-20 team at 2018 CONCACAF U-20 Championship. He made his senior team debut on 3 June 2021 in a 3–1 win against Cayman Islands.

== Career statistics ==
=== International ===
As of match played 7 June 2025

Appearances and goals by national team and year
National team	Year	Apps	Goals
Aruba	2021	2	0
Aruba	2022	2	0
Aruba	2023	3	1
Aruba	2024	3	0
Aruba	2025	3	1
Total		13	2

Scores and results list Aruba's goal tally first, score column indicates score after each Luydens goal.

List of international goals scored by Diederick Luydens
No.	Date	Venue	Opponent	Score	Result	Competition
1	14 October 2023	Trinidad Stadium, Oranjestad, Aruba	U.S. Virgin Islands	2–1	3–1	2023–24 CONCACAF Nations League
2	4 June 2025	BFA Technical Centre, Wildey, Barbados	Barbados	1–1	1–1	2026 FIFA World Cup qualification
