= Luke Dreher =

English footballer

Personal information
- Full name: Luke Garry Dreher
- Date of birth: 27 November 1998 (age 27)
- Place of birth: Epsom, England
- Height: 1.84 m (6 ft 0 in)
- Position: Midfielder

Team information
- Current team: Croydon Athletic
- Number: 16

Youth career
- 2007–2016: Crystal Palace

Senior career*
Years	Team	Apps	(Gls)
2016–2022	Crystal Palace	2	(0)
2022	→ Bromley (loan)	0	(0)
2023–2024	Wealdstone	18	(0)
2023–2024	→ Lewes (loan)	10	(1)
2024–	Croydon Athletic	56	(10)
- * Club domestic league appearances and goals as of 31 December 2024 (UTC)

Luke Garry Dreher (born 27 November 1998) is an English professional footballer who plays as a midfielder for Croydon Athletic.

== Career ==
=== Crystal Palace ===
Dreher joined the Crystal Palace academy system at the age of nine and in April 2016, reached the first team squad for the first time as an unused substitute in an away fixture against Manchester United. He was also named as the club's under-18 player of the year in May 2016.

At the start of the 2016–17 season, Dreher was again included in the first-team squad, but then incurred two separate injuries which kept him out of action for almost six months. Upon his return, he was made captain of the Palace under-23 side.

Dreher made his senior debut in a home 5–3 win against Bournemouth on 12 May 2019, as an injury-time substitute for Andros Townsend.

In Summer 2019, Dreher sustained an injury during pre-season training. Despite this, in October, he signed a contract extension until June 2021. He signed a further contract extension in August 2021.

On 26 January 2022, Dreher joined National League side Bromley on loan for the remainder of the 2021–22 season.

Dreher was released by Crystal Palace at the end of the 2021–22 season.

=== Wealdstone ===
In July 2023, Dreher joined National League club Wealdstone having impressed on trial. In November 2023, he joined Isthmian League Premier Division club Lewes on a one-month loan deal.

In November 2024, Dreher left the club having had his contract terminated by mutual consent.

== Career statistics ==
As of match played 12 May 2019

Appearances and goals by club, season and competition
Club	Season	League			FA Cup		League Cup		Total	
Club	Season	Division	Apps	Goals	Apps	Goals	Apps	Goals	Apps	Goals
Crystal Palace	2018–19	Premier League	1	0	0	0	0	0	1	0
Career total			1	0	0	0	0	0	1	0
