= Frankie Beckles =

British Virgin Islands footballer

Personal information
- Full name: Frankie Sinclair Beckles
- Date of birth: 11 March 2007 (age 19)
- Place of birth: Watford, England
- Position: Goalkeeper

Team information
- Current team: Wembley

Youth career
- –2021: Everett Rovers
- 2021–2022: Luton Town
- 2022–2024: Shrewsbury Town

Senior career*
Years	Team	Apps	(Gls)
2024–2025	Bedfont Sports (dual registration)	26	(0)
2024–2025	Wealdstone (dual registration)	4	(0)
2024–2025	Croydon Athletic (dual registration)	15	(0)
2025–	Wembley	7	(0)

International career^{‡}
2024–	British Virgin Islands	5	(0)
- * Club domestic league appearances and goals as of 14:08, 4 April 2025 (UTC) ‡ National team caps and goals as of 14:08, 4 April 2025 (UTC)

Frankie Beckles (born 11 March 2007) is a British Virgin Islands footballer who currently plays for Colchester United (On loan at AFC Croydon) and the British Virgin Islands national team.

== Club career ==
Beckles began playing youth football with Everett Rovers. At age fourteen, he was spotted by a Luton Town scout and joined the club's academy. After two years with the club, he was not offered a further scholarship and found himself back in local amateur football. While with the Onside Academy, a London-based team for unsigned youth players, he was noticed by scouts of League One side Shrewsbury Town and signed to a deal. As a youth, he regularly warms up alongside first-team keepers Marko Marosi and Harry Burgoyne.

In December 2024, Beckles went on loan to Leverstock Green from a dual-registration with Bedfont Sports and Wealdstone. He made his debut for the club on 26 December in a 0–1 defeat to Stotfold. In February 2025, the player signed for Wembley F.C. of the Combined Counties Football League Premier Division North from Bedfont Sports.

== International career ==
Born in Watford, Beckles qualifies to represent the British Virgin Islands through his paternal grandfather. He earned his first senior call-up to the British Virgin Islands national team in March 2024 for a pair of 2026 FIFA World Cup qualification matches against the U.S. Virgin Islands. He went on to debut on 22 March 2024, earning a 1–1 draw in the first match. He kept a clean sheet after regulation and forced a penalty shoot-out in the second leg, saving two penalty kicks for the eventual victory. Beckles played every minute of both matches. The victory marked the first-ever win for the British Virgin Islands in FIFA World Cup qualification and the first time advancing to the Group Stage.

=== International statistics ===
As of match played 4 September 2024

British Virgin Islands
Year	Apps	Goals
2024	5	0
Total	5	0
