= Dan Neville (football coach) =

English football coach (born 1978)

Personal information
- Full name: Daniel Neville
- Date of birth: 18 November 1978 (age 47)
- Place of birth: Bournemouth, England

Team information
- Current team: British Virgin Islands (technical director)

Managerial career
- Years: Team
- 2004–2017: AFC Bournemouth (youth)
- 2018–: British Virgin Islands (technical director)
- 2020: British Virgin Islands (caretaker)

Dan Neville (born 18 November 1978) is an English football coach and former player who is the current technical director of British Virgin Islands national team.

== Coaching career ==
Originally from Bournemouth, Neville began his coaching career in the academy at hometown club AFC Bournemouth. In March 2021, Neville took over from John Reilly to manage the British Virgin Islands' 2022 World Cup qualification ties against Guatemala and Saint Vincent and the Grenadines.

== Managerial statistics ==
As of 23 July 2021

Team	From	To	Record				
Team	From	To	G	W	D	L	Win %
British Virgin Islands	March 2021	November 2021	4	0	0	4	0.00
