= Michael Tulloch (footballer) =

Jamaican footballer and manager

Personal information
- Place of birth: Jamaica

International career
Years	Team	Apps	(Gls)
1980–1988	Jamaica		

Managerial career
- 2004: British Virgin Islands
- Arnett Gardens F.C.
- Frazsiers Whip F.C.

Michael Tulloch is a Jamaican professional football player and manager.

== Career ==
In 1980, he made his debut in the national team, where he played until 1988.

From January until December 2004 he coached the British Virgin Islands national football team.
