= Patrick Mitchell (football manager) =

British Virgin Islands football manager

Personal information
- Place of birth: British Virgin Islands

Managerial career
- Years: Team
- 2002: British Virgin Islands
- 2008: British Virgin Islands

Patrick Mitchell is a British Virgin Islands professional football manager.

== Career ==
Since January until December 2002 and since January until March 2008 he coached the British Virgin Islands national football team.
