= AFC Croydon Athletic =

Association football club in England

Coordinates: 51.3934°N 0.1266°W

Croydon Athletic
- Full name: Association Football Club Croydon Athletic
- Nickname: The Rams
- Founded: 2012
- Ground: Mayfield Stadium, Thornton Heath
- Owner: AFC Croydon Athletic 2023 Ltd
- Co-chairmen: Danny Young, Wilfried Zaha and Stormzy
- Manager: Vacant
- League: Isthmian League South East Division
- 2025–26: Isthmian League South East Division, 2nd of 22
- Website: croydonathletic.com
Home colours	Away colours

Association Football Club Croydon Athletic is a football club based in Thornton Heath in the London Borough of Croydon, England. Founded by supporters of Croydon Athletic after it folded, the club are currently members of the Isthmian League South East Division and play at the Mayfield Stadium. They are affiliated to the London Football Association.

== History ==
The club was formed in 2012 by fans of Croydon Athletic F.C. after that club withdrew from the Isthmian League during the 2011–12 season and eventually folded. Prior to their resignation, the club's owner Mazhar Majeed had been jailed following his involvement in the Pakistan cricket spot-fixing scandal, Majeed had been recorded admitting that he had purchased the club solely in order to launder money, and the club had been locked out of its ground by the local council due to unpaid debts.

The new club joined Division One of the Combined Counties League for the 2012–13 season. In their first season they finished eighth and won the Division One cup, beating Staines Lammas 5–0 in the final. They finished seventh the following season and were runner-up in 2014–15, earning promotion to level eight of the pyramid. Rather than entering the Premier Division of the Combined Counties League, they were transferred into the Southern Counties East League. The season also saw them win the London Senior Trophy, beating Interwood 4–3 after extra time. The first season in the Southern Counties East Football League saw them finish eleventh, their highest finish to date.

After four years at the club, manager Antony Williams left to join Chipstead in May 2016,although Peter Deadman was heavily linked to the role he was replaced by Kevin Rayner. At the end of his first season in charge he led the team to their highest finish of his reign of seventh. At the end of the 2020–21 season the club were transferred to the Premier Division South of the Combined Counties League.

In 2023, the club was bought by a consortium consisting of Premier League footballer Wilfried Zaha, rapper Stormzy and former Crystal Palace head of care Danny Young. Jermaine McGlashan was appointed manager during the 2023–24 season and led the club to a fifth-placed finish in the Premier Division South, qualifying for the promotion play-offs. After beating Jersey Bulls 2–1 in the semi-finals, they defeated Knaphill 2–1 in the final to earn promotion to the South East Division of the Isthmian League. McGlasham left the club nine matches into the 2024–25 season and was replaced by Keith Millen. In February 2025, Danny Kedwell replaced Millen.

Having consolidated the team, Kedwell had a successful first full season and the side finished runners-up to Three Bridges and qualified for the play-offs. The secured a place in the Final by beating Sittingbourne in the Semi-Final only to fall short in the Final, losing on penalties in front of a record 1262 at Mayfield Stadium. In October of 2026 it was announced that Kedwell was stepping down as manager with the team in 10th place </ref>|url=https://croydonathletic.com/danny-kedwell-club-statement/ |access-date=2026-10-15 |</ref>

== Ground ==
After its establishment the club were unable to continue playing at the former club's Mayfield Stadium, and so arranged to groundshare with Croydon F.C. at the Croydon Sports Arena. In January 2013 the Mayfield Stadium clubhouse was destroyed in a fire, but was rebuilt and the club moved to the ground in 2014, playing their first match there against Banstead Athletic on 15 November 2014.

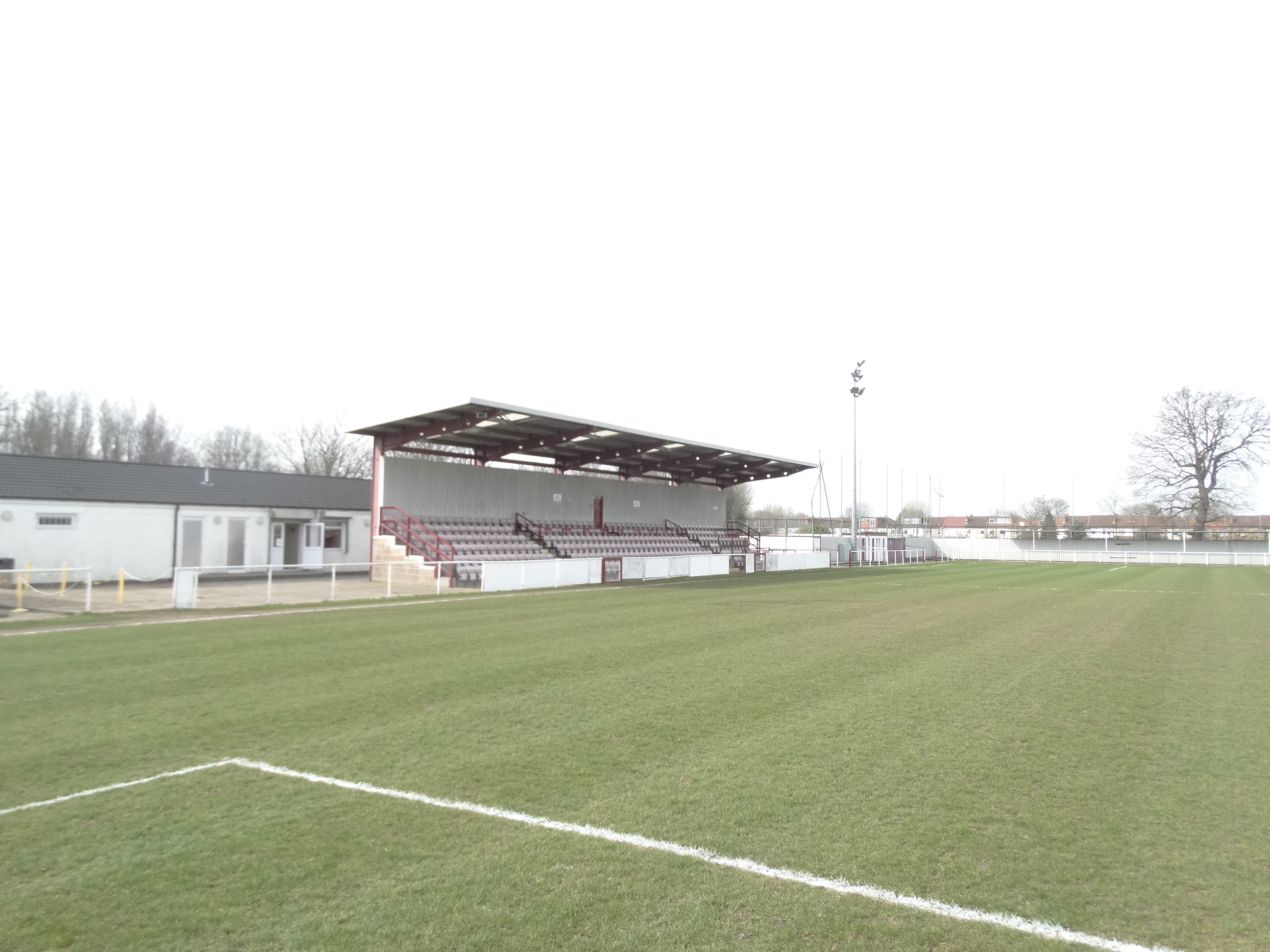
Mayfield Stadium

== Current squad ==
As of 7 August 2026

Note: Flags indicate national team as defined under FIFA eligibility rules; some limited exceptions apply. Players may hold more than one non-FIFA nationality.

No.	Pos.	Nation	Player
1	GK	CIV	Amadou Tangara
—	GK	ENG	Frankie Beckles
2	DF	ENG	Finley Marjoram
3	DF	ENG	Noah Watson
4	MF	ENG	Sam Blackman
5	MF	ENG	Luke O'Neill
6	DF	ENG	Ronnie Vint
7	MF	GUY	Kadell Daniel
8	MF	ENG	Jack Paxman
9	FW	ENG	David Bremang
10	FW	ENG	Reece Grant
11	FW	ENG	Greg Cundle

No.	Pos.	Nation	Player
14	FW	ENG	Dan Thompson
15	MF	ENG	James Taylor
16	DF	ENG	Luke Dreher
17	FW	ENG	Josh Williams
18	MF	ENG	James Dunne
19	MF	ENG	
20	DF	IRL	Cian McCarthy
21	DF	ENG	Ben Wynter
22	FW	ENG	Brandon Pierrick
—	DF	ENG	Sonny Black
—	FW	ENG	David Boateng

== Club officials ==
Position	Name
Chairman	Danny Young
Vice-chairman	Paul Smith
Secretary	Paul Smith
Matchday Communication	Sean Ryan
Manager	Vacant
Assistant Manager	Vacant
Goalkeeping Coach	Ben Wilmore
Data Coach	Dave Kast
Physio	Sam Oyarhono

== Managers ==
As of matches played 15 October 2026. All competitive matches are counted.

Name	From	To	G	W	D	L	%W
Antony Williams	29 May 2012	4 May 2016	166	86	17	63	51.81
Kevin Rayner	26 May 2016	18 May 2023	286	89	58	139	31.12
Lee Roots & Kevin Rayner	19 May 2023	13 September 2023	15	8	3	4	53.33
Danny Young (Caretaker)	16 September 2023	11 October 2023	5	3	0	2	60.00
Jermaine McGlashan	11 October 2023	16 September 2024	48	27	4	17	56.25
Michael Kamara (caretaker)	16 September 2024	18 November 2024	14	5	7	2	35.71
Keith Millen	18 November 2024	13 February 2025	14	3	4	7	21.43
Danny Kedwell	14 February 2025	15 October 2026	85	46	10	29	54.12
Caretaker	15 October 2026	current	0	0	0	0	—

== Honours ==
- Combined Counties League
  - Premier Division South Play Off winners 2023–24
  - Division One Cup winners 2012–13
- London Senior Trophy
  - Winners 2014–15

== Records ==
- Best FA Cup performance: Second qualifying round, 2025–26
- Best FA Trophy performance; Second qualifying round, 2024–25
- Best FA Vase performance: Second round, 2018–19
- Record attendance: 1,262 v AFC Whyteleafe, Isthmian League South East Division play-off final, 1 May 2026
- Most appearances: Nahum Green, 242
- Most goals: Brandon Pierrick, 62
- Most goals in a season: Warren Mfula, 45 in 2016–17

== See also ==
- AFC Croydon Athletic players
- AFC Croydon Athletic managers
