= Bryan Labissiere =

Haitian footballer (born 1997)

Personal information
- Date of birth: 11 February 1997 (age 29)
- Place of birth: Paris, France
- Height: 1.69 m (5 ft 7 in)
- Positions: Forward; midfielder

Team information
- Current team: Thionville
- Number: 11

Youth career
- 2003–2005: CA Romainville
- 2005–2010: Les Lilas
- 2010–2016: Paris Saint-Germain

Senior career*
Years	Team	Apps	(Gls)
2016–2017	Paris Saint-Germain B	21	(0)
2018	Romorantin	13	(4)
2018–2019	Saint-Malo	26	(0)
2019–2020	Guingamp B	19	(2)
2020–2021	Le Puy	3	(0)
2021–2024	Épinal	84	(26)
2024–2025	Bourg-Péronnas	25	(2)
2025–	Thionville	5	(2)

International career^{‡}
2013	France U16	6	(1)
2018–	Haiti	2	(1)
- * Club domestic league appearances and goals as of 3 October 2025 ‡ National team caps and goals as of 9 June 2024

Bryan Labissiere (born 11 February 1997) is a professional footballer who plays as a forward and midfielder for Ligue 3 club Thionville. Born in France, he represents the Haiti national team.

== International career ==
Labissiere represented France at under-16 level. On 29 May 2018, he made his international debut for Haiti in a friendly match against Argentina.
