= Joshua Bertie =

British Virgin Islands footballer

Personal information
- Date of birth: 9 October 1996 (age 30)
- Place of birth: London, England
- Positions: Full-back; forward

Team information
- Current team: Bashley

Youth career
- Highcliffe Hawks

College career
Years	Team	Apps	(Gls)
2015–2016	Cowley Tigers	28	(5)
2017	Lander Bearcats		

Senior career*
Years	Team	Apps	(Gls)
2018–2022	Andover Town	82	(52)
2022	Dorchester Town	2	(0)
2022–2024	Winchester City	21	(0)
2022	→ Bemerton Heath Harlequins (loan)	3	(1)
2023	→ Hythe & Dibden (loan)	3	(0)
2024–	Bashley	9	(0)

International career^{‡}
2018–	British Virgin Islands	17	(1)
- * Club domestic league appearances and goals as of 08:27, 19 April 2024 (UTC) ‡ National team caps and goals as of 08:27, 19 April 2024 (UTC)

Joshua Bertie (born 9 October 1996) is a footballer who plays as a full-back or forward for Bashley. Born in England, he represents the British Virgin Islands at international level.

== Club career ==
Bertie made his competitive debut for Andover Town on 4 August 2018 in a 10–1 defeat to AFC Stoneham, playing all ninety minutes of the match. He scored his first competitive goal for the club as part of a brace just a week later, in the 28th minute of a 5–2 defeat to United Services Portsmouth in the FA Cup. After a change of position from full-back to forward, Bertie scored 31 goals in 26 matches for Andover Town in the 2021–22 season, earning him a move to Southern League Premier Division South side Dorchester Town. In June 2022, he joined fellow Southern Premier Division side Winchester City. In November 2022, he played a match on loan at Bemerton Heath Harlequins. In August 2023, he was playing for Wessex League side Hythe & Dibden. In February 2024, he joined Southern League Division One side Bashley.

== International career ==
Bertie made his senior international debut on 25 July 2018 in a 3–2 victory over Sint Maarten.

== Career statistics ==
=== Club ===
As of 14 July 2023

Appearances and goals by club, season and competition
Club	Season	League			FA Cup		League Cup		Other		Total	
Club	Season	Division	Apps	Goals	Apps	Goals	Apps	Goals	Apps	Goals	Apps	Goals
Andover Town	2018–19	Wessex Football League	29	8	1 (Note: Appearances in the FA Cup)	2	1 (Note: Appearances in the Wessex League Cup)	0	3 (Note: One appearance in the Hampshire Senior Cup, one appearance in the North Hants Senior Cup, one appearance and one goal in the Andover Open Cup)	1	34	11
Andover Town	2019-20	Wessex Football League	27	16							27	16
Andover Town	2020-21	Wessex Football League	11	4							11	4
Andover Town	2021-22	Wessex Football League	24	24							24	24
Andover Town	Total		91	52	1	2	1	0	3	1	96	55
Dorchester Town	2021-22	Premier Division South	2	0							2	0
Winchester City	2022-23	Premier Division League	20	0							20	0
Bemerton Heath Harlequins	2022-23	Wessex Football League	1	0							1	0
Career total			114	52	1	2	1	0	3	1	119	55

=== International ===
As of match played 6 November 2023.

Appearances and goals by national team and year
National team	Year	Apps	Goals
British Virgin Islands	2018	3	0
British Virgin Islands	2019	4	0
British Virgin Islands	2020	0	0
British Virgin Islands	2021	4	0
British Virgin Islands	2023	4	1
Total		15	1
