= John Reilly (football coach) =

Irish footballer and coach

Personal information
- Place of birth: Hackney, England

Senior career*
Years	Team	Apps	(Gls)
- Leytonstone
- Ilford
- East Ham United

Managerial career
- 2018–2020: British Virgin Islands
- * Club domestic league appearances and goals

John Reilly is an English-Irish football coach and former player. He was most recently the manager of the British Virgin Islands national football team.

== Playing career ==
Born in Hackney, London to Irish parentage, Reilly played Non-League football for Leytonstone, Ilford and East Ham United.

== Coaching career ==
Following his playing career, Reilly moved to Ireland, coaching at Crumlin United, Malahide United and Home Farm. In 2018, after moving to the islands, Reilly was appointed technical director and manager of the British Virgin Islands national football team.
