= Isaï Marselia =

Aruban footballer (born 1997)

Personal information
- Full name: Isaï Ismael Marselia
- Date of birth: 2 April 1997 (age 29)
- Place of birth: Nijmegen, Netherlands
- Position: Midfielder

Team information
- Current team: Sporting Khalsa

Youth career
- –2018: Go Ahead Eagles

Senior career*
Years	Team	Apps	(Gls)
2018	Go Ahead Eagles	0	(0)
2018	Mickleover		
2018–2019	Stamford		
2019	Halesowen Town	3+	(2)
2019–2020	Sutton Coldfield Town	18	(11)
2020	Alvechurch	3	(0)
2020–2021	Boldmere St. Michaels	0	(0)
2021–2022	Sutton Coldfield Town	20	(8)
2022	Coleshill Town	6	(3)
2022	Boldmere St. Michaels	3	(0)
2023	Wolverhampton Casuals	11	(4)
2023	Chelmsley Town	1	(0)
2023–2024	Romulus	24	(6)
2024	Studley	0	(0)
2024	Romulus	8	(5)
2024–2025	Sporting Khalsa	15	(0)
2025–2026	Sutton Coldfield Town	15	
2026–	Sporting Khalsa		

International career^{‡}
- Curacao U20
2024–	Aruba	11	(1)
- * Club domestic league appearances and goals as of 04:33, 4 August 2025 (UTC) ‡ National team caps and goals as of 04:35, 4 August 2025 (UTC)

Isaï Ismael Marselia (born 2 April 1997) is a professional footballer who plays as a midfielder for Midland Football League Premier Division club Sporting Khalsa.. Born in the Netherlands, he represents the Aruba national team.

== Early life ==
Marselia was born in 1997. He spent time living in Zutphen, the Netherlands, as a child.

== Education ==
Marselia graduated high school. He studied economics.

== Club career ==
In 2019, Marselia signed for English side Sutton Coldfield Town FC. He was regarded as one of the club's most important players. He was retained by Sporting Khalsa on 8 July 2026.

== International career ==
Marselia was a Curaçao youth international. He captained the Curaçao national under-20 football team.

== Style of play ==
Marseila mainly operates as a midfielder. He is known for his shooting ability.

== Personal life ==
Marselia was born to Curacaoan parents. They founded a church.
