= Stanley Segarel =

French footballer (born 1994)

Personal information
- Date of birth: 4 March 1994 (age 32)
- Place of birth: Villiers-le-Bel, France
- Height: 1.84 m (6 ft 0 in)
- Position: Forward

Team information
- Current team: Porto Vecchio

Senior career*
Years	Team	Apps	(Gls)
2012–2014	Amiens	0	(0)
2014	→ AC Amiens (loan)	11	(2)
2014–2015	Roye	19	(3)
2016	AC Amiens	1	(0)
2016–2017	Beauvais	20	(6)
2017–2018	Grande-Synthe	26	(10)
2018–2019	Amiens B	24	(4)
2018–2019	Amiens	3	(0)
2019–2020	Gazélec Ajaccio	6	(0)
2020–2021	Feignies Aulnoye	8	(2)
2021–2025	Corte	86	(31)
2025	Porto Vecchio	5	(5)

International career
2023	Saint Martin	3	(5)
- * Club domestic league appearances and goals

Stanley Segarel (born 4 March 1994) is a French professional footballer who plays for Porto Vecchio as a forward.

Segarel began his career with Amiens SC, for whom he made two appearances in the Coupe de la Ligue during the 2013–14 season. He was loaned out to Championnat de France amateur side AC Amiens for the second part of the same season, playing 11 league matches for the club and scoring twice. He went on to sign for Roye on a free transfer in the summer of 2014.

== International career ==
On 8 September 2023, Segarel scored his first international goal in a 6–0 victory over Anguilla in the first round of the CONCACAF Nations League.

== Personal life ==
Segarel was born in France and is of Martiniquais descent.

== Career statistics ==
=== Club ===
As of 21 November 2015

Club	Season	League			Cup		League Cup		Total	
Club	Season	Division	Apps	Goals	Apps	Goals	Apps	Goals	Apps	Goals
Amiens	2013–14	National	0	0	0	0	2	0	2	0
AC Amiens (loan)	2013–14	CFA Group A	11	2	0	0	0	0	11	2
Roye	2014–15	CFA Group A	13	3	0	0	0	0	13	3
Roye	2015–16	CFA Group A	6	0	0	0	0	0	6	0
Career totals			30	5	0	0	2	0	32	5

=== International ===
No.	Date	Venue	Opponent	Score	Result	Competition
1	8 September 2023	Raymond E. Guishard Technical Centre, The Valley, Anguilla	Anguilla	2–0	6–0	2023–24 CONCACAF Nations League C
2	16 October 2023	SKNFA Technical Center, Basseterre, Saint Kitts and Nevis	Anguilla	1–0	8–0	2023–24 CONCACAF Nations League C
3	16 October 2023	SKNFA Technical Center, Basseterre, Saint Kitts and Nevis	Anguilla	2–0	8–0	2023–24 CONCACAF Nations League C
4	16 October 2023	SKNFA Technical Center, Basseterre, Saint Kitts and Nevis	Anguilla	3–0	8–0	2023–24 CONCACAF Nations League C
5	16 October 2023	SKNFA Technical Center, Basseterre, Saint Kitts and Nevis	Anguilla	4–0	8–0	2023–24 CONCACAF Nations League C
