= Luka Chalwell =

British Virgin Islands footballer (born 2004)

Personal information
- Full name: Luka Chalwell
- Date of birth: 11 April 2004 (age 22)
- Place of birth: British Virgin Islands
- Position: Forward

Team information
- Current team: Bishop's Stortford

Youth career
- Poole Town
- 2022–2023: Eastleigh

Senior career*
Years	Team	Apps	(Gls)
2022–2024	Eastleigh	2	(0)
2022–2023	→ Christchurch (loan)	28	(6)
2023–2024	→ Sholing (loan)	16	(1)
2024–2025	Winchester City	20	(4)
2025–	Bishop's Stortford	15	(4)

International career^{‡}
2019	British Virgin Islands U15	5	(4)
2021	British Virgin Islands U20	3	(1)
2021–	British Virgin Islands	29	(6)
- * Club domestic league appearances and goals as of 13:40, 18 November 2025 (UTC) ‡ National team caps and goals as of 00:52, 7 June 2026 (UTC)

Luka Chalwell (born 11 April 2004) is a British Virgin Islands professional footballer who plays as a forward for Southern League Premier Division Central club Bishop's Stortford and the British Virgin Islands national team.

== Club career ==
A youth academy player of Poole Town, Chalwell is the first British Virgin Islander to play in the FA Youth Cup. On 15 June 2023, he signed a two-year contract with Eastleigh, making him the first ever British Virgin Islander footballer to sign a professional contract.

In February 2025, Chalwell joined Southern League Premier Division Central club Bishop's Stortford having started the season with Winchester City.

== International career ==
After representing his nation in youth football, Chalwell received his first call-up to the senior team in March 2021. He made his senior debut on 27 March 2021 in a 3–0 loss against Guatemala. On 9 September 2023, he scored his first two international goals in a 3–1 CONCACAF Nations League win against Turks and Caicos Islands.

== Career statistics ==
=== International ===
As of match played 6 June 2026

Appearances and goals by national team and year
National team	Year	Apps	Goals
British Virgin Islands	2021	4	0
British Virgin Islands	2022	4	0
British Virgin Islands	2023	5	3
British Virgin Islands	2024	8	0
British Virgin Islands	2025	5	1
British Virgin Islands	2026	3	2
Total		29	6

Scores and results list British Virgin Islands' goal tally first, score column indicates score after each Chalwell goal.

List of international goals scored by Luka Chalwell
No.	Date	Venue	Opponent	Score	Result	Competition
1	9 September 2023	A. O. Shirley Recreation Ground, Road Town, British Virgin Islands	Turks and Caicos Islands	2–0	3–1	2023–24 CONCACAF Nations League
2	9 September 2023	A. O. Shirley Recreation Ground, Road Town, British Virgin Islands	Turks and Caicos Islands	3–1	3–1	2023–24 CONCACAF Nations League
3	12 October 2023	Daren Sammy Cricket Ground, Gros Islet, Saint Lucia	Dominica	1–0	1–1	2023–24 CONCACAF Nations League
4	15 November 2025	Truman Bodden Sports Complex, George Town, Cayman Islands	Bahamas	6–0	6–0	2025–26 CONCACAF Series
5	29 March 2026	Truman Bodden Sports Complex, George Town, Cayman Islands	Anguilla	2–0	4–0	2025–26 CONCACAF Series
6	6 June 2026	Estadio Municipal de Marbella, Marbella, Spain	Bonaire	2–0	2–0	Friendly
Last updated 6 June 2026
