= List of top-division football clubs in CONCACAF countries =

CONCACAF countries on this map of the world's six football confederations.

This is a list of top-division association football clubs in CONCACAF countries. CONCACAF is the football confederation that oversees the sport in North America including the South American countries of Guyana, Suriname and French Guiana.

All countries and most of the dependent territories in this region have their own football associations which are members of CONCACAF, with the exceptions being Greenland and Saint-Pierre and Miquelon which are not members of CONCACAF or any other football confederation. The French Overseas Departments of French Guiana, Guadeloupe and Martinique, as well as Saint-Martin and Sint Maarten (the French and Dutch parts of the island of Saint Martin), also have their own football associations which are members of CONCACAF (but are not members of FIFA).

Each of the CONCACAF member countries have their own football league systems. The clubs playing in each top-level league compete for the title as the country's club champions, and also for places in next season's CONCACAF club competition, the CONCACAF Champions League (either directly for teams in the North American and Central American Zones, or through the CFU Club Championship for teams in the Caribbean Zone). Due to promotion and relegation, the clubs playing in the top-level league are different every season for some countries; however, some league systems (such as those of the United States and Canada) do not have promotion and relegation. The North American SuperLiga (North America) was an official tournament approved by the CONCACAF between the US/Canadian and Mexican leagues.

The champions of the previous season in each country are listed in bold. If the season is divided into Apertura and Clausura without a single season title, both champions of the previous season are bolded.

Some clubs play in a national football league other than their own country's. Where this is the case the club is noted as such.

- For clubs playing at lower divisions, see the separate articles linked to in the relevant sections.
- For clubs belonging to any of the other five continental football confederations of the world, see List of association football clubs.

Club name	Club finished the previous season as league champions.
Club name	Club won the most recent Apertura tournament. (Note: The following nations play on an Apertura and Clausura schedule: Belize, Costa Rica, El Salvador, Guatemala, Haiti, Honduras, Mexico, Nicaragua and Panama.)
Club name	Club won the most recent Clausura tournament.
Club name	Club won the most recent Apertura **and** Clausura tournaments.
Club name	Club finished the previous season as league premiers. (Note: Several CONCACAF nations use a play-off system culminating the regular season to determine their champion. In several nations, the regular season champion is recognized.)

== Anguilla ==
- Football association: Anguilla Football Association
- Top-level league: AFA Football League

As of 2026 season:

Club	City
Attackers	The Valley, Anguilla
Diamond	The Valley, Anguilla
Doc's United	The Valley, Anguilla
Eagle Claw	
East Enders	The Valley, Anguilla
Lymers	The Valley, Anguilla
Roaring Lions	Stoney Ground, Anguilla
Spartan	The Valley, Anguilla
Uprising	The Valley, Anguilla
West End Predators	

== Antigua and Barbuda ==
- Football association: Antigua and Barbuda Football Association
- Top-level league: Antigua and Barbuda Premier Division

As of 2025–26 season:

Club	City
All Saints United	North Sound
Attacking Saints	St. John's
Aston Villa	St. John's
Garden Stars	Piggotts
Green City	Bendals
Grenades	St. John's
Jennings United	Piggotts
John Hughes	John Hughes
Old Road	St. John's
Ottos Rangers	Piggotts
Pigotts Bullets	Piggotts
Potters Tigers	Potters Village

== Aruba ==
- Football association: Arubaanse Voetbal Bond
- Top-level league: Aruban Division di Honor

As of 2025–26 season:

Club	City
Britannia	Piedra Plat
Bubali	Bubali
Dakota	Oranjestad/Dakota
Estrella	Santa Cruz
La Fama	Savaneta
Nacional	Palm Beach
Racing Club Aruba	Oranjestad
Real Koyari	Noord
River Plate	Oranjestad
Sporting Aruba	Ayo

== Bahamas ==
- Football association: Bahamas Football Association
- Top-level league: BFA Senior League

As of 2025–26 season:

Club	City
Baha Juniors	Nassau, New Providence
Bears	Nassau, New Providence
Cavalier	Nassau, New Providence
Dynamos	Coral Harbour, New Providence
Future Stars	Nassau, New Providence
Gladiators	Nassau, New Providence
Inter Nassau	Nassau, New Providence
Renegades	Nassau, New Providence
University of the Bahamas	Nassau, New Providence
United	Nassau, New Providence
Western Warriors	Nassau, New Providence

== Barbados ==
- Football association: Barbados Football Association
- Top-level league: Barbados Premier League

As of 2026 season:

Club	City
Bagatelle	Bagatelle, Saint Thomas
Britton's Hill United	Bridgetown, Saint Michael
Ellerton	Bridgetown, Saint Michael
Kickstart Rush	Wildley, Saint Michael
Paradise	Christ Church, Christ Church
Pride of Gall Hill	Christ Church, Christ Church
St. Andrew Lions	Carrington, Saint Philip
UWI Blackbirds	Cavehill, Saint Michael
Weymouth Wales	Carrington, Saint Philip
Wotton	Carrington, Saint Philip

== Belize ==
- Football association: Football Federation of Belize
- Top-level league: Premier League of Belize

As of 2025–26 season:

Club	City
Belmopan Bandits	Belmopan
Benque Viejo United	Benque, Cayo
Napoles	Belmopan
Port Layola	Belize City
Progresso	Progresso, Corozal
Verdes	Benque, Cayo
Wagiya	Dangriga, Stann Creek

== Bermuda ==
- Football association: Bermuda Football Association
- Top-level league: Digicel Premier Division

As of 2025–26 season:

Club	City
Dandy Town Hornets	Pembroke
Boulevard Blazers	Hamilton
Devonshire Colts	Devonshire
Devonshire Cougars	Devonshire
North Village Rams	Hamilton
Paget Lions	Southampton
PHC Zebras	Southampton
St. George's Colts	St. George's
X-Roads Warriors	Smith's Parish
Young Men's Social Club	Devonshire

== Bonaire ==
- Football association: Bonaire Football Federation
- Top-level league: Bonaire League

As of 2025–26 season:

Bonaire League

Club	City
Arriba Perú	Kralendijk
Atlétiko Flamingo	Nikiboko
Atlétiko Tera Corá	Tera Corá
Estrellas	Noord Salina
Independiente Bonaire	Kralendijk
Juventus	Antriol
Real Rincon	Rincon
Uruguay	Antriol
Vespo	Rincon
Vitesse	Antriol
Young Boys	Kralendijk

== British Virgin Islands ==
- Football association: British Virgin Islands Football Association
- Top-level league: BVIFA National Football League

As of 2025–26 season:

Club	City
Avengers	Spanish Town, Virgin Gorda
Islanders	Road Town, Tortola
Lion Heart	
Old Madrid	Spanish Town, Virgin Gorda
One Love United	Road Town, Tortola
Panthers	Road Town, Tortola
Positive	
Rebels	Road Town, Tortola
Sugar Boys	Road Town, Tortola
Virgin Gorda United	Spanish Town, Virgin Gorda
Wolues	Road Town, Tortola

== Canada ==
- Country: Canada
- Football association: Canadian Soccer Association
- Top-level league: Canadian Premier League (men), Northern Super League (women)

As of the 2026 season:

Club	City
Atlético Ottawa	Ottawa, Ontario
Cavalry FC	Calgary, Alberta
Forge FC	Hamilton, Ontario
HFX Wanderers FC	Halifax, Nova Scotia
Inter Toronto FC	Toronto, Ontario
Pacific FC	Langford, British Columbia
FC Supra du Québec	Laval, Quebec
Vancouver FC	Langley, British Columbia

The following clubs participate in Major League Soccer, the top-division football league of the United States. They contest the Canadian Championship for the Voyageurs Cup, along with Canadian Premier League teams and lower-level clubs to determine one of Canada's three entrants into the CONCACAF Champions Cup.

Club	City
CF Montréal	Montreal, Quebec
Toronto FC	Toronto, Ontario
Vancouver Whitecaps FC	Vancouver, British Columbia

The Northern Super League began play in April 2025.

Club	City
AFC Toronto	Toronto, Ontario
Calgary Wild FC	Calgary, Alberta
Halifax Tides FC	Halifax, Nova Scotia
Montreal Roses FC	Laval, Quebec
Ottawa Rapid FC	Ottawa, Ontario
Vancouver Rise FC	Burnaby, British Columbia

== Cayman Islands ==
- Football association: Cayman Islands Football Association
- Top-level league: Cayman Islands Premier League

As of 2025–26 season:

Club	City
345 FC	George Town
Academy	George Town
Bodden Town	Bodden Town
Cayman Athletic	Cayman Brac
Cayman Brac	George Town
East End United	East End
Elite	West Bay
Future	West Bay
Latinos	George Town
Scholars International	West Bay
Sunset	George Town
Tigers	George Town

== Costa Rica ==
- Football association: Federación Costarricense de Fútbol
- Top-level league: Primera División

As of 2025–26 season:

Club	City
Alajuelense	Alajuela, Alajuela
Cartaginés	Cartago, Cartago
Guadalupe	Guadalupe, San José
Herediano	Heredia, Heredia
Municipal Liberia	Liberia, Guanacaste
Municipal Pérez Zeledón	San Isidro de El General, San José
Puntarenas	Puntarenas, Puntarenas
San Carlos	Quesada, Alajuela
Saprissa	San Juan de Tibás, San José
Sporting	San José, San José

== Cuba ==
- Football association: Asociación de Fútbol de Cuba
- Top-level league: Campeonato Nacional

As of 2025 season:

Club	City
Artemisa	Guanajay, Artemisa
Camagüey	Camagüey, Camagüey
Ciego de Ávila	Ciego de Ávila, Ciego de Ávila
Cienfuegos	Cienfuegos, Cienfuegos
Granma	Bayamo, Granma
Guantánamo	Guantánamo, Guantánamo
Holguín	Banes, Holguín
Isla de La Juventud	Nueva Gerona, Isla de la Juventud
La Habana	Havana, La Habana
Las Tunas	Victoria de Las Tunas, Las Tunas
Matanzas	Matanzas, Matanzas
Mayabeque	Güines, Mayabeque
Pinar del Río	Pinar del Río, Pinar del Río
Sancti Spíritus	Sancti Spíritus, Sancti Spíritus
Santiago de Cuba	Santiago de Cuba, Santiago de Cuba
Villa Clara	Santa Clara, Villa Clara

== Curaçao ==
- Football association: Curaçao Football Federation
- Top-level league: Curaçao Promé Divishon

As of 2025–26 season:

Sekshon Pagá

Club	City
Atlétiko Saliña	Willemstad
Barber	Barber
Centro Dominguito	Willemstad
Inter Willemstad	Willemstad
Jong Colombia	Willemstad
Jong Holland	Willemstad
Scherpenheuvel	Willemstad
SUBT	Kintjan
UNDEBA	Bandabou
Victory Boys	Zapateer

== Dominica ==
- Football association: Dominica Football Association
- Top-level league: Dominica Premier League

As of 2026 season:

Club	City
Bath Estate	Roseau, Saint George
Dublanc	Dublanc, Saint Peter
Harlem United	Roseau, Saint George
Mahaut Soca Strikers	Mahaut, Saint Paul
Middleham United	
Mighty Avengers	
Portsmouth Bombers	Portsmouth, Saint John
Pointe Michel	Pointe Michel, Saint George
South East	La Plaine, Saint Patrick
WE United	Castle Bruce, Saint David

== Dominican Republic ==
- Football association: Federación Dominicana de Fútbol
- Top-level league: Liga Dominicana

As of 2025–26 season:

Club	City
Atlantico	Puerto Plata
Atlético Pantoja	Santo Domingo, Distrito Nacional
Atlético San Cristóbal	San Cristóbal
Atletico Vega Real	La Vega, Dominican Republic
Cibao	Santiago de los Caballeros
Delfines del Este	La Romana
Jarabacoa	Jarabacoa
Moca	Moca
O&M	Santo Domingo, Distrito Nacional
Salcedo	Salcedo

== El Salvador ==
- Football association: Federación Salvadoreña de Fútbol
- Top-level league: Salvadoran Primera División

As of 2025–26 season:

Club	City
Águila	San Miguel, San Miguel
Alianza	San Salvador, San Salvador
Cacahuatique	Ciudad Barrios, San Miguel
FAS	Santa Ana, Santa Ana
Firpo	Usulután, Usulután
Fuerte San Francisco	San Francisco Gotera, Morazán
Hércules	San Salvador, San Salvador
Inter	Santa Tecla, La Libertad
Isidro Metapán	Metapán, Santa Ana
Municipal Limeño	Santa Rosa de Lima, La Unión
Platense	Zacatecoluca, La Paz
Zacatecoluca	Zacatecoluca, La Paz

== French Guiana ==
- Football association: Ligue de Football de La Guyane Française
- Top-level league: Championnat National

As of 2025–26 season:

Club	City
Agouado	Apatou, Saint-Laurent-du-Maroni
Aigles d'Or de Mana	Mana, Cayenne
Armire	Rémire-Montjoly, Cayenne
Cosma Foot	Saint-Laurent-du-Maroni, Saint-Laurent-du-Maroni
CSCC	Cayenne, Cayenne
Étoile Matoury	Matoury, Cayenne
Grand Santi	Mana, Cayenne
Karib	Cayenne, Cayenne
Le Geldar	Kourou, Cayenne
Loyola	Remire-Montjoly, Cayenne
Matoury	Macouria, Cayenne
Olympique de Cayenne	Cayenne, Cayenne
Rémire	Rémire-Montjoly, Cayenne
Sinnamary	Sinnamary, Cayenne

== Grenada ==
- Football association: Grenada Football Association
- Top-level league: GFA Premier League

As of 2026 season:

Club	City
Camerhogne	Gouyave, Saint John
Hard Rock	Sauteurs, Saint Patrick
Honved	Saint George's, Saint George
Hurricanes	Victoria, Saint Mark's
Paradise International	Grenville, Saint Andrew
Queens Park Rangers	River Road, Saint George
SAB Spartans	Saint George's, Saint George
St. Andrew's FL	Saint Andrew's, Saint Andrew
St. David's	Saint David's, Saint David's
St. John's	Gouyave, Saint John

== Guadeloupe ==
- Football association: Ligue Guadeloupéenne de Football
- Top-level league: Division d'Honneur

As of 2025–26 season:

Club	City
Arsenal	Petit-Bourg, Basse-Terre
Baie-Mahault	Baie-Mahault, Basse-Terre
CERFA	Les Abymes, Pointe-à-Pitre
Club Amical Marquisat	Capesterre-Belle-Eau, Basse-Terre
Dynamo	Le Moule, Pointe-à-Pitre
Gosier	Le Gosier, Pointe-à-Pitre
Gourbeyrienne	Gourbeyre, Basse-Terre
Jeunesse Evolution	Les Abymes, Pointe-à-Pitre
L'Etoile	Morne-à-l'Eau, Pointe-à-Pitre
La Gauloise	Basse-Terre, Basse-Terre
Le Moule	Le Moule, Pointe-à-Pitre
Moulien	Le Moule, Pointe-à-Pitre
Siroco	Le Gosier, Pointe-à-Pitre
Stade Lamentinois	Lamentin, Basse-Terre

== Guatemala ==
- Football association: FedefutGuate
- Top-level league: Liga Nacional de Guatemala

As of 2025–26 season:

Club	City
Achuapa	El Progreso, Jutiapa
Antigua	Antigua Sacatepequez
Atlético Mictlán	Asunción Mita, Jutiapa
Aurora	Amatitlán, Guatemala
Coban Imperial	Coban, Altaverapz
Comunicaciones	Guatemala City, Guatemala
Guastatoya	Guastatoya, El Progreso
Malacateco	Malacatán, San Marcos
Marquense	San Marcos, San Marcos
Mixco	Mixco, Guatemala
Municipal	Guatemala City, Guatemala
Xelajú	Quetzaltenango, Quetzaltenango

== Guyana ==
- Football association: Guyana Football Federation
- Top-level leagues:GFF Elite League

As of 2025 season:

Club	City
Ann's Grove United	Georgetown, Demerara-Mahaica
Den Amstel	Bartica, Essequibo Islands-West Demerara
Fruta Conquerors	Georgetown, Demerara-Mahaica
Guyana Defence Force	Georgetown, Demerara-Mahaica
Guyana Police Force	Georgetown, Demerara-Mahaica
Mainstay Goldstar	Essequibo, Essequibo Islands-West Demerara
Monedderlust	Berbice, Berbice
Santos	Georgetown, Demerara-Mahaica
Slingerz	Vergenoegen, Essequibo Islands-West Demerara
Western Tigers	Providence, Demerara-Mahaica

== Haiti ==
- Football association: Fédération Haïtienne de Football
- Top-level league: Championnat de Premiere Division

As of 2025–26 season:

Club	City
América des Cayes	Les Cayes, Sud
Baltimore	Saint-Marc, Artibonite
Capoise	Cap-Haïtien, Nord
Cavaly	Léogâne, Ouest
Cosmopolites	Port-au-Prince, Ouest
Don Bosco	Pétion-Ville, Ouest
FICA	Cap-Haïtien, Nord
Juventus des Cayes	Les Cayes
Ouanaminthe	Ouanaminthe, Nord-Est
Racing	Gonaïves, Artibonite
Racing Haïtien	Port-au-Prince, Ouest
Real Hope	Cap-Haitien, Haiti
Tempête	Saint-Marc, Artibonite
Violette	Port-au-Prince, Ouest

== Honduras ==
- Football association: FENAFUTH
- Top-level league: Liga Nacional

As of 2025–26 season:

Club	City
Choloma	Choloma, Cortés
Génesis	Comayagua, Comayagua
Juticalpa	Juticalpa, Olancho
Marathón	San Pedro Sula, Cortés
Motagua	Tegucigalpa, Francisco Morazán
Platense	Puerto Cortés, Cortés
Olancho	Juticalpa. Olancho
Olimpia	Tegucigalpa, Francisco Morazán
Real España	San Pedro Sula, Cortés
Lobos UPNFM	Tegucigalpa, Francisco Morazán
Victoria	La Ceiba, Atlántida

== Jamaica ==
- Football association: Jamaica Football Federation
- Top-level league: Red Stripe Premier League

As of 2025–26 season:

Club	City
Arnett Gardens	Kingston
Cavalier	Kingston
Chapelton Maroons	Chapelton, Clarendon
Dunbeholden	Portmore, Saint Catherine
Harbour View	Kingston
Molynes United	Kingston
Montego Bay United	Montego Bay, Saint James
Mount Pleasant	Runaway Bay, Saint Ann
Portmore United	Portmore, Saint Catherine
Racing United	Portmore, Saint Catherine
Spanish Town Police	Spanish Town, Saint Catherine
Tivoli Gardens	Kingston
Treasure Beach	Treasure Beach, Saint Elizabeth
Waterhouse	Kingston

== Martinique ==
- Football association: Ligue de Football de Martinique
- Top-level league: Championnat National

As of 2024–25 season:

Club	City
Aiglon	Le Lamentin, Fort-de-France
Colonial	Fort-de-France, Fort-de-France
Emulation	Schœlcher, Fort-de-France
Espoir Sainte-Luce	Sainte-Luce, Le Marin
Franciscain	Le François, Le Marin
CS Case-Pilote	Case-Pilote, Saint-Pierre
Golden Star	Fort-de-France, Fort-de-France
Golden Lion	Saint-Joseph, Fort-de-France
New Club	Petit-Bourg, Basse-Terre
RC Saint-Joseph	Saint-Joseph, Fort-de-France
Samartine	Sainte-Marie, La Trinité
Trénelle	Fort-de-France, Fort-de-France
US Diamantinoise	Le Diamant, Le Marin

== Mexico ==
- Country: Mexico
- Football governing body: Federación Mexicana de Fútbol (FMF)
- Top professional leagues: Liga MX (men) and Liga Femenil (women)
Location of Liga MX clubs in the 2026–27 season.
Location of Mexico City clubs.

Liga MX clubs in the 2026–27 season:

Club	City	Stadium
América	Mexico City	Azteca
Atlante	Mexico City	Azteca
Atlas	Guadalajara	Jalisco
Atlético San Luis	San Luis Potosí	Libertad Financiera
Cruz Azul	Mexico City	Azteca
Guadalajara	Guadalajara	Akron
Juárez	Ciudad Juárez	Olímpico Benito Juárez
León	León	León
Monterrey	Monterrey	BBVA
Necaxa	Aguascalientes	Victoria
Pachuca	Pachuca	Hidalgo
Puebla	Puebla	Cuauhtémoc
Querétaro	Querétaro	Corregidora
Santos Laguna	Torreón	Corona
Tijuana	Tijuana	Caliente
Toluca	Toluca	Nemesio Diez
Tigres UANL	San Nicolás de los Garza	Universitario
Pumas UNAM	Mexico City	Olímpico Universitario

== Montserrat ==
- Football association: Montserrat Football Association
- Top-level league: Montserrat Championship

As of 2016 season:

Club	City
Ideal SC	Brades
Montserrat Volcano Observatory Tremors	Brades
Royal Montserrat Police Force	Brades
FC Elberton	Davy Hill
Jolly Rodger FC	Saint John's
FC Saint John's	Saint John's
Little Bay FC	Little Bay
PC United	Plymouth
Bata Falcons	Plymouth

== Nicaragua ==
- Football association: Federación Nicaragüense de Fútbol
- Top-level league: Primera División de Nicaragua

As of 2025–26 season:

Club	City
ART Jalapa	Jalapa
Diriangén	Diriamba
Managua	Managua
Matagalpa FC	Matagalpa
Rancho Santana FC	Rivas
Real Estelí	Estelí
Real Madriz	Somoto
Sport Sébaco	Matagalpa
UNAN Managua	Managua
Walter Ferretti	Managua

== Panama ==
- Football association: Federación Panameña de Fútbol
- Top-level league: Liga Panameña de Fútbol

As of 2025 season:

Club	City
Alianza	Chilibre, Panamá
Árabe Unido	Colón, Colón
Atlético Nacional	Panama City, Panamá
CAI	La Chorrera, Panamá Oeste
Plaza Amador	Panama City, Panamá
Herrara	Chitré, Herrera
San Francisco	La Chorrera, Panamá Oeste
Sporting San Miguelito	San Miguelito, Panamá
Tauro	Panama City, Panamá
UMECIT	San Miguelito, Panamá
Universitario	Penonomé, Coclé
Veraguas United	Santiago de Veraguas, Veraguas

== Puerto Rico ==
- Football association: Federación Puertorriqueña de Fútbol
- Top-level league: Liga Puerto Rico Pro

As of 2025-26 season: Liga PR Pro

Club	City
Academia Quintana	San Juan
Caguas Sporting FC	Caguas
DS Edusoccer	Mayagüez
EF Taurinos de Cayey	Cayey
Guayama FC	Guayama
Guaynabo FC	Guaynabo
FC Mayagüez	Mayaguez
Metropolitan FA	San Juan
Ponce FC	Ponce
Puerto Rico Surf	Guaynabo
San Juan FC	San Juan

This team played in the North American Soccer League in the United States.

Club	City
Puerto Rico FC – (North American Soccer League)	Juan Ramón Loubriel Stadium, Bayamón

== Saint Kitts and Nevis ==
- Football association: Saint Kitts and Nevis Football Association
- Top-level league: SKNFA National Bank Premier League

As of 2026 season:

Club	City
Bath United	Bath, Saint John Figtree
Cayon Rockets	Cayon, Saint Mary Cayon
Conaree FC	Conaree, Saint Peter Basseterre
Dieppe Bay Eagles	Dieppe Bay, Saint John Capisterre
Newtown United	Basseterre, Saint George Basseterre
Sandy Point FC	Sandy Point, Saint Anne Sandy Point
St Paul's United	Basseterre, Saint George Basseterre
St Peter's FC	Basseterre, Saint Peter Basseterre
United Old Road Jets	Basseterre, Saint George Basseterre
Village Superstars	Basseterre, Saint George Basseterre

== Saint Lucia ==
- Country: Saint Lucia
- Football association: Saint Lucia National Football Union
- Top-level league: SLFA First Division

As of 2023 season:

Club	City
1987 All Stars	Gros Islet, Gros Islet
B1 FC	Castries, Castries
BAYS FC	Castries, Castries
El Niños FC	Micoud, Micoud
GMC United	Gros Islet, Gros Islet
Monchy United	Castries, Castries
Northern United All Stars	Gros Islet, Gros Islet
Platinum FC	Vieux Fort, Vieux Fort
Uptown Rebels SC	Vieux Fort, Vieux Fort
Victory Eagles SC	Vieux Fort, Vieux Fort

== Saint-Martin ==
- Football association: Comité de Football des Îles du Nord (Note: Also responsible for football on the island of Saint-Barthelemy)
- Top-level leagues: Saint-Martin Senior League, Saint-Barthelemy Championships

As of 2025 season: Saint-Martin Senior League

Club	City
Junior Stars	Sandy Ground
Juventus de Saint-Martin	Sandy Ground
Orleans Attackers	Quartier-d'Orleans
St-Louis Stars	Sandy Ground

As of 2025 season: Saint-Barthelemy Championships

Club	City
Arawak	Gustavia, Saint-Barthélemy
ASPSB	Gustavia, Saint-Barthélemy
Diables Rouges	Gustavia, Saint-Barthélemy
Gustavia	Gustavia, Saint-Barthélemy

== Saint Vincent and the Grenadines ==
- Football association: Saint Vincent and the Grenadines Football Federation
- Top-level league: National Championship

As of 2024-25 season:

Club	City
Avenues United	Kingstown, Saint George
Awesome FC	Kingstown, Saint George
BESCO Pastures	Layou, Saint Andrew
Camdonia Chelsea	Camden Park, Saint Andrew
JaBell FC	Kingstown, Saint George
Layou	Layou, Saint Andrew
North Leeward Predators	Chateaubelair, Saint David
Hope International	Kingstown, Saint George
Sion Hill	Sion Hill, Charlotte
SV United	Georgetown, Charlotte

== Sint Maarten ==
- Football association: Sint Maarten Soccer Association
- Top-level league: Sint Maarten Premier League

As of 2024–25 season:

Club	City
758 Boyz	Philipsburg, Sint Maarten
Belvedere FC	Philipsburg, Sint Maarten
Oualichi SA	Philipsburg, Sint Maarten
SCSA Eagles	Philipsburg, Sint Maarten
FC Soualiga	Philipsburg, Sint Maarten
United Superstars	Philipsburg, Sint Maarten

== Suriname ==
- Country: Suriname
- Football association: Surinamese Football Association
- Top-level league: Suriname Major League

As of 2025–26 season:

Club	Location
Broki	Paramaribo, Marowijne
Flora	Paramaribo, Paramaribo
Inter Moengotapoe	Moengo, Marowijne
Inter Wanica	Meerzorg, Commewijne
Leo Victor	Paramaribo, Paramaribo
Notch	Moengo, Marowijne
PVV	Paramaribo, Paramaribo
Robinhood	Paramaribo, Paramaribo
Transvaal	Paramaribo, Paramaribo
Voorwaarts	Paramaribo, Paramaribo

== Trinidad and Tobago ==
- Country: Trinidad and Tobago
- Football association: Trinidad and Tobago Football Association
- Top-level league: TT Premier Football League

As of 2025–26 season:

Club	City
Central FC	California
Club Sando	Couva
Cunupia	Cunupia
Defence Force	Chaguaramas
La Horquetta Rangers	Port of Spain
Morvant Caledonia United	Morvant
FC Phoenix	Canaan
Point Fortin Civic	Point Fortin
Police FC	Saint James
Port of Spain	Port of Spain
Prison Service	Arouca
San Juan Jabloteh	San Juan
W Connection	Point Lisas

== Turks and Caicos Islands ==
- Football association: TCIFA
- Top-level league: Provo Premier League

As of 2025–26 season:

Club	City
Academy Eagles	Providenciales, Caicos Islands
Beaches	Providenciales, Caicos Islands
Cheshire Hall	Providenciales, Caicos Islands
Provo United	Providenciales, Caicos Islands
SWA Sharks	Providenciales, Caicos Islands
Teachers FC	Providenciales, Caicos Islands
Teachers FC Young Strikers	Providenciales, Caicos Islands

== United States ==
- Country: United States
- Football association: United States Soccer Federation
- Top-level league: Major League Soccer (men), National Women's Soccer League (women) and USL Super League (women)

As of the 2026 Major League Soccer season:

Club	Metro	Stadium	Joined League
Atlanta United FC	Atlanta	Mercedes-Benz Stadium	2017
Austin FC	Austin	Q2 Stadium	2021
Charlotte FC	Charlotte	Bank of America Stadium	2022
Chicago Fire FC	Chicago	Soldier Field	1998
Colorado Rapids	Denver	Dick's Sporting Goods Park	1996
Columbus Crew	Columbus, Ohio	ScottsMiracle-Gro Field	1996
FC Cincinnati	Cincinnati	TQL Stadium	2019
FC Dallas	Dallas	Toyota Stadium	1996
D.C. United	Washington, D.C.	Audi Field	1996
Houston Dynamo FC	Houston	Shell Energy Stadium	2006
Inter Miami CF	Miami	Nu Stadium	2020
LA Galaxy	Los Angeles	Dignity Health Sports Park	1996
Los Angeles FC	Los Angeles	BMO Stadium	2018
Minnesota United FC	Minneapolis–Saint Paul	Allianz Field	2017
Nashville SC	Nashville	Geodis Park	2020
New England Revolution	Boston	Gillette Stadium	1996
New York City FC	New York City	Yankee Stadium	2015
New York Red Bulls	New York City	Sports Illustrated Stadium	1996
Orlando City SC	Orlando, Florida	Inter&Co Stadium	2015
Philadelphia Union	Philadelphia	Subaru Park	2010
Portland Timbers	Portland	Providence Park	2011
Real Salt Lake	Salt Lake City	America First Field	2005
San Diego FC	San Diego	Snapdragon Stadium	2025
San Jose Earthquakes	San Francisco Bay Area	PayPal Park	1996
Seattle Sounders FC	Seattle	Lumen Field	2009
Sporting Kansas City	Kansas City	Sporting Park	1996
St. Louis City SC	St. Louis	Energizer Park	2023

As of the 2024 National Women's Soccer League season:

Club	Metro	Stadium	Joined League
Angel City FC	Los Angeles	BMO Stadium	2022
Bay FC	San Francisco Bay Area	PayPal Park	2024
Chicago Red Stars	Chicago	SeatGeek Stadium	2013
Houston Dash	Houston	Shell Energy Stadium	2014
Kansas City Current	Kansas City	CPKC Stadium	2021
NJ/NY Gotham FC	New York	Red Bull Arena	2013
North Carolina Courage	Research Triangle	WakeMed Soccer Park	2017
Orlando Pride	Central Florida	Inter&Co Stadium	2016
Portland Thorns FC	Portland	Providence Park	2013
Racing Louisville FC	Louisville	Lynn Family Stadium	2021
San Diego Wave FC	San Diego	Snapdragon Stadium	2022
Seattle Reign FC	Seattle	Lumen Field	2013
Utah Royals	Salt Lake City	America First Field	2024
Washington Spirit	Washington, D.C.	Audi Field	2013

As of the 2025–26 USL Super League season:

Club	Metro	Stadium	Joined League
Brooklyn FC	New York	Maimonides Park	2024
Carolina Ascent FC	Charlotte	American Legion Memorial Stadium	2024
Dallas Trinity FC	Dallas	Cotton Bowl Stadium	2024
DC Power FC	Washington, D.C.	Audi Field	2024
Fort Lauderdale United FC	Fort Lauderdale	Training Facility at NSU	2024
Lexington SC	Lexington	Red Bull Arena	2024
Spokane Zephyr FC	Spokane	One Spokane Stadium	2024
Sporting JAX	Jacksonville	Hodges Stadium	2025
Tampa Bay Sun FC	Tampa	Lexington SC Stadium (Note: The new Lexington SC Stadium, which will house both the USL1 and USLS sides, is expected to open in time for the 2024–25 USLS season.)	2024

== United States Virgin Islands ==
- Football association: Soccer VI
- Top-level leagues: (Note: The US Virgin Islands Soccer Championship is decided by a tournament featuring the top two teams from both the St Croix and St Thomas Soccer Leagues) St Croix Soccer League, St Thomas League

As of 2025 season:

St Croix Soccer League

Club	City
CAPA	Christiansted
Helenites	Grove Place
Prankton SC	Frederiksted
Rovers FC	Christiansted

St Thomas Soccer League

Club	City
Castaways SC	Saint Thomas
Massey SA	Saint Thomas
New Vibes	Saint Thomas
Raymix	Charlotte Amalie

== See also ==
- List of top-division football clubs in AFC countries
- List of top-division football clubs in CAF countries
- List of top-division football clubs in CONMEBOL countries
- List of top-division football clubs in OFC countries
- List of top-division football clubs in UEFA countries
- List of top-division football clubs in non-FIFA countries
