= List of football clubs in the British Virgin Islands =

List of association football clubs in the British Virgin Islands

This is a list of association football clubs in the British Virgin Islands.

== The football clubs ==
- Islanders FC
- Old Madrid FC
- Panthers FC
- Rebels FC
- Lion Heart FC
- Sugar Boys FC
- Positive FC
- VG United
- Wolues FC
- One Love FC
- Avengers FC
