= 2021 BVIFA National Football League =

BVIFA National Football League
- Season: 2021
- Champions: Sugar Boys
- Relegated: None
- CFU Club Shield: Sugar Boys
- Matches: 61
- Goals: 200 (3.28 per match)
- Top goalscorer: McGraw Baptiste
- Biggest home win: RBL 6–2 OLU (2 May 2021)
- Biggest away win: VGU 0–4 WFC (28 Feb. 2021)
- Highest scoring: 8 goals: RBL 6–2 OLU (2 May 2021)
- Longest unbeaten run: 11 games: Islanders (27 Feb. – 16 May 2021)

The 2021 BVIFA National Football League was the 11th season of the competition. Due to the COVID-19 pandemic in the British Virgin Islands, the competition did not begin until 14 February 2021, and concluded on 5 September 2021.

Sugar Boys won the competition, making it their second British Virgin Islands title won, defeating Lion Heart in the two-legged final.

== Regular season ==
| Pos | Team | Pld | W | D | L | GF | GA | GD | Pts | Qualification |
|---|---|---|---|---|---|---|---|---|---|---|
| 1 | Sugar Boys (C) | 9 | 7 | 1 | 1 | 17 | 7 | +10 | 22 | Qualification for Super Six |
| 2 | Islanders | 9 | 7 | 0 | 2 | 18 | 7 | +11 | 21 | Qualification for Super Six |
| 3 | Wolues | 9 | 6 | 1 | 2 | 23 | 11 | +12 | 19 | Qualification for Super Six |
| 4 | Lion Heart | 9 | 5 | 2 | 2 | 19 | 14 | +5 | 17 | Qualification for Super Six |
| 5 | Virgin Gorda United | 9 | 3 | 2 | 4 | 11 | 15 | −4 | 11 | Qualification for Super Six |
| 6 | Panthers | 9 | 3 | 1 | 5 | 15 | 17 | −2 | 10 | Qualification for Super Six |
| 7 | Old Caribbean | 9 | 2 | 4 | 3 | 10 | 12 | −2 | 10 | |
| 8 | Old Madrid | 9 | 2 | 1 | 6 | 13 | 23 | −10 | 7 | |
| 9 | Rebels | 9 | 1 | 2 | 6 | 11 | 20 | −9 | 5 | |
| 10 | One Love United | 9 | 1 | 2 | 6 | 10 | 21 | −11 | 5 | |

Source: BVIFA
Rules for classification: 1) points; 2) goal difference; 3) number of goals scored.
(C) Champions

== Super Six ==
| Pos | Team | Pld | W | D | L | GF | GA | GD | Pts | Qualification |
|---|---|---|---|---|---|---|---|---|---|---|
| 1 | Sugar Boys (C) | 5 | 4 | 0 | 1 | 13 | 4 | +9 | 12 | Qualification for Championship Final |
| 2 | Lion Heart | 5 | 4 | 0 | 1 | 11 | 8 | +3 | 12 | Qualification for Championship Final |
| 3 | Virgin Gorda United | 4 | 2 | 0 | 2 | 4 | 6 | −2 | 6 | |
| 4 | Panthers | 4 | 2 | 0 | 2 | 5 | 10 | −5 | 6 | |
| 5 | Wolues | 5 | 1 | 0 | 4 | 6 | 8 | −2 | 3 | |
| 6 | Islanders | 5 | 1 | 0 | 4 | 6 | 9 | −3 | 3 | |

Source: BVIFA
Rules for classification: 1) points; 2) goal difference; 3) number of goals scored.
(C) Champions

=== Championship final ===
First leg

27 June 2021

| Sugar Boys | 3-3 | Lion Heart |
|---|---|---|
| German Gonzalez 38'; Derol Redhead 81'; McGraw Baptiste (90+p) | | Dwayne Smith 36', 62' (pen.); Nicarious Watt 74' |
Penalties
| | 5-4 |

Second leg

5 September 2021

| Lion Heart | 0-2 | Sugar Boys |
|---|---|---|
| | | McGraw Baptiste 53' (pen.); German Gonzalez 87' |

Sugar Boys won 5-3 on aggregate.

Third leg

[if necessary] Sugar Boys n/p Lion Heart

== Champions ==
| Team | Location | Stadium | Capacity |
|---|---|---|---|
| Sugar Boys FC | Road Town | Shirley Recreation Ground | 2,000 |
