= 2018 BVIFA National Football League =

BVIFA National Football League
- Season: 2018
- Champions: One Love United FC
- Top goalscorer: (British Virgin Islands) Richard Morgan (15 goals)

The 2018 BVIFA National Football League is the ninth season of the football league in the British Virgin Islands. The season started on 18 February and ended on 18 August 2018. Many league games took place in front of dozens of spectators.

== Standings ==
Pos	Team	Pld	W	D	L	GF	GA	GD	Pts	Qualification
1	One Love United FC	15	13	1	1	48	19	+29	40 (Note: Remaining match apparently declared void and not (re)played.)	Qualification for 2019 Caribbean Club Championship
2	Sugar Boys FC	16	11	1	4	51	19	+32	34	
3	Islanders FC	15	10	2	3	34	10	+24	32	
4	Wolues FC	16	8	1	7	46	30	+16	25	
5	Panthers FC	16	7	2	7	37	23	+14	23	
6	Rebels FC	16	6	1	9	22	36	−14	19	
7	Old Madrid FC	16	5	3	8	29	36	−7	18	
8	Virgin Gorda United	16	2	2	12	14	41	−27	8	
9	FC Sea Argo	16	2	1	13	18	85	−67	7	

Source: BVIFA
Rules for classification: 1) points; 2) goal difference; 3) number of goals scored.
