= 2016–17 BVIFA National Football League =

BVIFA National Football League
- Season: 2016–17
- Champions: Islanders
- Relegated: Virgin Gorda United
- CFU Club Championship: Islanders; Sugar Boys
- Matches: 14
- Goals: 56 (4 per match)
- Top goalscorer: Kenmore Peters
- Biggest home win: Sugar Boys 5–0 VG United (9 October 2016)
- Biggest away win: One Love United 1–4 Sugar Boys (1 October 2016)
- Highest scoring: Woules 5–1 VG United (9 October 2016)

The 2016–17 BVIFA National Football League is the seventh season of the competition. The season began on 18 September 2016.

Islanders FC won the championship, making it their seventh British Virgin Islands title. Islanders along with the top four sides qualified for the 2017 BVIFA President's Cup, a postseason tournament to determine the domestic cup champion.

== Table ==
Pos	Team	Pld	W	D	L	GF	GA	GD	Pts	Qualification or relegation
1	Islanders (C)	14	14	0	0	42	4	+38	42	Qualification to the President's Cup
2	Sugar Boys	14	11	0	3	36	12	+24	33	Qualification to the President's Cup
3	Rebels	14	8	1	5	28	20	+8	25	Qualification to the President's Cup
4	One Love United	14	7	0	7	33	20	+13	21	Qualification to the President's Cup
5	Wolues	14	6	1	7	30	32	−2	19	
6	Old Madrid	14	5	0	9	19	28	−9	15	
7	Panthers	14	3	1	10	15	34	−19	10	
8	Virgin Gorda United (R)	14	0	1	13	6	59	−53	1	Relegation to Local Leagues

Updated to match(es) played on 12 February 2017.
Source: https://www.rsssf.org/tablesb/brmaagd2017.html
(C) Champions;
(R) Relegated
