= 2012–13 BVIFA National Football League =

BVIFA National League
- Season: 2012–13
- Matches played: 24
- Goals scored: 104 (4.33 per match)

The 2012–13 BVIFA National Football League is the fourth season of the highest competitive football league in the British Virgin Islands, after it was founded in 2009. The season commenced on 18 November 2012. Islanders FC are the defending champions, having won the previous three championships.

== Team information ==
For the 2012–13 season the league decided to split the teams into two groups, based on the position they finished in the standings at the end of the 2011–12 season. At the end of the season the league is to be split into two leagues, the Premier League and the National League.

=== Group A ===
- East End Eagles
- Islanders FC
- Lucian Stars
- Old Madrid
- Sugar Boys
- VG Ballstars

=== Group B ===
- Haitian Stars
- One Love United
- Panthers FC
- Rebels FC
- VG United
- Wolues FC

== League table ==
=== Group A ===
Pos	Team	Pld	W	D	L	GF	GA	GD	Pts	Relegation
1	Islanders FC	9	8	1	0	36	5	+31	25	
2	VG Ballstars	9	4	1	4	12	12	0	13	
3	Sugar Boys	9	6	0	3	26	11	+15	18	
4	Old Madrid (R)	9	4	0	5	14	21	−7	12	Relegation to National League
5	East End Eagles (R)	9	2	0	7	10	29	−19	6	Relegation to National League
6	Lucian Stars (R)	5	0	0	5	3	23	−20	0	Relegation to National League

Rules for classification: 1) points; 2) goal difference; 3) number of goals scored.
(R) Relegated

=== Group B ===
Pos	Team	Pld	W	D	L	GF	GA	GD	Pts	Relegation
1	One Love United	10	7	2	1	19	8	+11	23	
2	Rebels FC	10	6	1	3	16	9	+7	19	
3	Wolues FC	10	5	2	3	23	14	+9	17	
4	Panthers FC (R)	10	3	5	2	17	16	+1	14	Relegation to National League
5	Haitian Stars (R)	9	1	4	4	11	17	−6	7	Relegation to National League
6	VG United (R)	9	0	0	9	3	25	−22	0	Relegation to National League

Rules for classification: 1) points; 2) goal difference; 3) number of goals scored.
(R) Relegated

== Results ==
=== Group A ===
Home \ Away	EAE	ISL	LUC	OLD	SUG	VGB
East End Eagles				1–2	0–4	
Islanders FC	12–1			4–0	4–3	
Lucian Stars	0–3			2–9		
Old Madrid						1–0
Sugar Boys			5–1			0–1
VG Ballstars		0–6	3–0			

Legend: Blue = home team win; Yellow = draw; Red = away team win.

=== Group B ===
Home \ Away	HAI	ONE	PAN	REB	VGU	WOL
Haitian Stars		1–2	2–2	1–1		
One Love United				2–0		2–3
Panthers FC					5–0	1–4
Rebels FC			1–2			1–0
VG United	1–2	0–3				
Wolues FC					6–0	

Legend: Blue = home team win; Yellow = draw; Red = away team win.
