= British Virgin Islands national under-17 football team =

National youth association football team

British Virgin Islands U-17
- Nickname: The Nature Boyz
- Association: British Virgin Islands; Football Association
- Confederation: CONCACAF (North America)
- Head coach: Vincent Samuel
First colours	Second colours

The British Virgin Islands national U-17 football team represents the British Virgin Islands in tournaments and friendly matches at the Under-17 level and is controlled by the British Virgin Islands Football Association.

== Players ==
=== Current Squad ===
The following 21 players were selected for the most recent fixtures in the 2026 CONCACAF U-17 World Cup qualification.

No.	Pos.	Player	Date of birth (age)	Club
1	GK	Morris Mark	30 June 2009 (age 17)	(British Virgin Islands Football Association) Rebels FC
18	GK	Akeem Paddy	19 January 2009 (age 17)	(British Virgin Islands Football Association) Islanders FC
19	GK	Kerjahni Provost	13 November 2011 (age 14)	(British Virgin Islands Football Association) Islanders FC
5	DF	Kenroy William	1 December 2010 (age 15)	(British Virgin Islands Football Association) Sugar Boys FC
11	DF	Mayan Baptiste	8 September 2011 (age 14)	(British Virgin Islands Football Association) Sugar Boys FC
12	DF	Devin Daley	12 February 2011 (age 15)	(British Virgin Islands Football Association) Islanders FC
20	DF	Eljay Scatliffe	21 January 2009 (age 17)	
21	DF	Roman Nibbs	26 March 2009 (age 17)	(British Virgin Islands Football Association) Rebels FC
4	DF	Carlon Stewart	20 April 2010 (age 16)	
3	DF	James Tucker	27 June 2010 (age 16)	
2	MF	D'andre McSheen	10 March 2009 (age 17)	(British Virgin Islands Football Association) Rebels FC
8	MF	Theo Coombs (captain)	3 July 2009 (age 17)	(The Football Association) Eastbourne Borough
10	MF	Marc Tan	26 March 2009 (age 17)	(British Virgin Islands Football Association) Rebels FC
16	MF	Quacey Cooper	6 April 2011 (age 15)	
17	MF	Emery Jones	2 May 2011 (age 15)	
7	MF	Myles Penn	4 June 2010 (age 16)	(British Virgin Islands Football Association) Panthers FC
6	MF	Quinn Pascoe	14 July 2011 (age 15)	
14	FW	Jaheim Bijai	16 March 2009 (age 17)	(British Virgin Islands Football Association) Panthers FC
9	FW	Richard Arthur	22 December 2009 (age 16)	
13	FW	Akhori Sebastián	13 May 2011 (age 15)	(British Virgin Islands Football Association) Islanders FC
15	FW	Dre Prince	24 June 2010 (age 16)	

== 2013 CONCACAF U-17 Championship qualification ==
=== Group E ===
At Trinidad & Tobago

Team	Pld	W	D	L	GF	GA	GD	Pts
Trinidad and Tobago	3	3	0	0	28	1	+27	9
Suriname	3	2	0	1	22	4	+18	6
Guyana	3	1	0	2	14	5	+9	3
British Virgin Islands	3	0	0	3	0	54	−54	0

24 July 2012

Trinidad and Tobago	23–0	British Virgin Islands
Fortune 10'; Mitchell 13', 19', 43', 50'; Sam 23', 29', 38', 54', 60', 70', 71'; Seecharan 31', 41'; Garcia 36'; Creed 48', 76'; Watson 84'	Report

Hasely Crawford Stadium
Attendance: 200
Referee: Valdin Legister (Jamaica)

26 July 2012

British Virgin Islands	0–13	Guyana
	Report	Knights 7', 76'; Fletcher 23' 26', 28', 59'; Wronge 30'; Parks 34' 49', 68', 87', 89'; Enoe 38'

Ato Boldon Stadium
Attendance: 60
Referee: Canaan St Catherine (St Lucia)

28 July 2012

Suriname	18–0	British Virgin Islands
Doesberg 2', 40'; Everd 11'; Asoman 21', 32', 33', 76'; Gainsa 28', 43', 66', 81', 83'; Zandveld 45', 60', 88'; Juliaans 72', 90'; Aroeman 80'	Report

Hasely Crawford Stadium
Attendance: 110
Referee: Junior Andujar (Dominican Republic)

== See also ==
- British Virgin Islands national football team
