= Football in the British Virgin Islands =

- Country: British Virgin Islands
- Governing body: British Virgin Islands Football Association
- National teams: men's national team; women's national team

National competitions
- Presidents Cup; The FA Cup

Club competitions
- BVIFA National Football League; BVIFA National Women's Football League

International competitions
- Caribbean Club Championship; CONCACAF Champions League; FIFA Club World Cup; FIFA World Cup (National Team); CONCACAF Gold Cup (National Team); CONCACAF Nations League (National Team)

Association football – commonly known as football (or soccer in the United States and Canada) – is a popular sport in the British Virgin Islands. The British Virgin Islands Football Association – the territory's football governing body – organizes the men's and women's national teams and administers the territory's professional league the BVIFA National Football League. As members of Caribbean Football Union teams are eligible for the Caribbean Club Championship and the territory's membership in CONCACAF allows teams to participate in that organizations club and national team competitions. The British Virgin Island are also a member of FIFA and is therefore eligible to play in the World Cup. The national teams also compete in the Virgin Islands Championship against the US Virgin Islands.

== History ==
The British Virgin Islands Football Association was founded in 1973 and became full members of CONCACAF and FIFA in 1974. The Association traces formal football to a three team league formed by Royal Engineers and expatriates who were expanding Beef Island Airport. The men's national team won the Leeward Islands Tournament in 1986.

== League system ==
The territory's association administers the highest competitive football league in the British Virgin Islands, the BVIFA National Football League. The league was founded in 2009 after the merger between the leagues of the territory's two most populous islands, the Tortola League and the Virgin Gorda League. The league's most successful team is Islanders FC with eight league championships. In 2012 the league decided to split the teams into two groups, based on the position they finished in the standings at the end of the 2011-12 season.

Level	Leagues/Divisions
1	BVIFA National Football League; 10 clubs

== Football stadiums on the British Virgin Islands ==
Stadium	Capacity	City	Tenants
A. O. Shirley Recreation Ground	1,500	Road Town	British Virgin Islands national football team
East End / Long Look Stadium Venue	2,500	Greenland	British Virgin Islands, FA HQ
Virgin Gorda Recreation Ground	500	The Baths, Virgin Gorda	
