= 2015–16 BVIFA National Football League =

The 2015–16 BVIFA National Football League was the sixth season of the competition. The champions were Sugar Boys, who beat the four-time defending champions, Islanders FC 2–0 in the final.

== Table ==
=== Group A ===
Team	Pld	W	D	L	GF	GA	GD	Pts	Qualification
Sugar Boys	2	1	1	1	17	11	+6	4	Semifinals
Woules	1	1	0	0	2	1	+1	3	Semifinals
Virgin Gorda United	2	0	1	1	3	5	−2	1	
Ball Stars	1	0	0	1	1	2	−2	0	

=== Group B ===
Team	Pld	W	D	L	GF	GA	GD	Pts	Qualification
Islanders	2	0	2	0	3	3	0	2	Semifinals
Rebels	2	0	2	0	3	3	0	2	Semifinals
Old Madrid	1	0	1	0	1	1	0	1	
Panthers	1	0	1	0	1	1	0	1	

=== Knockout Tournament ===
Semifinals
A1	Islanders	4
B2	Wolues	0
B1	Sugar Boys	5
A2	Panthers	2

Final
A1	Islanders	0
B1	Sugar Boys	2
