= 2019–20 BVIFA National Football League =

BVIFA National Football League
- Season: 2019–20
- Champions: Islanders
- CFU Club Championship: Islanders

The 2019–20 BVIFA National Football League was the tenth season of the football league in the British Virgin Islands. The season started on 13 October 2019 and ended on 13 December 2020. Due to the COVID-19 pandemic, the season was suspended on 15 March 2020 and did not resume until 26 July 2020.

Islanders won their eighth British Virgin Islands league championship.
