= Kevin Fisher (footballer) =

British Virgin Islands footballer

Personal information
- Full name: Kevin Fisher-Daniel
- Date of birth: 27 March 1995 (age 31)
- Place of birth: East End, British Virgin Islands
- Height: 1.89 m (6 ft 2 in)
- Position: Striker

Team information
- Current team: Panthers FC

College career
Years	Team	Apps	(Gls)
2015–2016	Otero Junior College		

Senior career*
Years	Team	Apps	(Gls)
2013–2015	Islanders FC		
- Islanders FC
- Tooting Bec
2021–	Panthers FC		

International career^{‡}
2014–	British Virgin Islands	6	(0)
- * Club domestic league appearances and goals as of 20:08, 7 February 2022 (UTC) ‡ National team caps and goals as of 20:08, 7 February 2022 (UTC)

Kevin Fisher-Daniel (born 27 March 1995) is a British Virgin Islands international footballer who plays for Panthers FC, as a striker.

== Club career ==
Fisher played club football for Islanders FC, before playing college soccer with Otero Junior College.

After leaving Otero he returned to Islanders FC. After a spell in England with Tooting Bec, in November 2021 he returned to the British Virgin Islands to play with Panthers FC.

== International career ==
He made his international debut for the British Virgin Islands in 2014.

=== International career statistics ===
As of match played 6 May 2021

British Virgin Islands
Year	Apps	Goals
2014	2	0
2021	4	0
Total	6	1
