= Desire Montgomery Butler =

Association football and cricket player

Personal information
- Full name: Desire Montgomery Butler
- Date of birth: 5 January 1967 (age 59)
- Place of birth: British Virgin Islands
- Position: Goalkeeper

Team information
- Current team: Islanders FC

Senior career*
Years	Team	Apps	(Gls)
2004–2009	Veterans		
2009–2018	Islanders FC		

International career
2000–2012	British Virgin Islands	15	(0)
- * Club domestic league appearances and goals

Desire Montgomery Butler (born 5 January 1967) is a former association football and cricket player from British Virgin Islands (BVI). In football, he played as a goalkeeper for Islanders FC and for the BVI national team. In cricket he played as a left-handed batsman and wicket-keeper for the BVI national team.

== Cricket ==
The BVI were invited to take part in the 2006 Stanford 20/20, whose matches held official Twenty20 status. Butler made a single appearance in the tournament against Saint Lucia in a preliminary round defeat, with him ending the British Virgin Islands innings of 105/9 unbeaten without scoring.

== Football ==
Butler played in both BVI qualifying matches for the FIFA World Cups of 2002, 2006, and 2010. He was captain of the BVI side in the 2008 Caribbean Cup qualification match against St Kitts and Nevis.

== Career statistics ==
International

National Team	Year	Apps	Goals
British Virgin Islands
British Virgin Islands	2000	2	0
British Virgin Islands	2004	7	0
British Virgin Islands	2008	4	0
British Virgin Islands	2010	1	0
British Virgin Islands	2012	1	0
British Virgin Islands	Total	15	0
