= Troy Caesar =

British Virgin Islands footballer (born 1994)

Personal information
- Full name: Troy Kavon Caesar
- Date of birth: 13 May 1994 (age 32)
- Place of birth: Road Town, British Virgin Islands
- Height: 1.89 m (6 ft 2 in)
- Position: Central defender

Team information
- Current team: Potros FC

College career
Years	Team	Apps	(Gls)
2015–2016	Andrew Fighting Tigers	27	(2)
2017–2018	Life Running Eagles		

Senior career*
Years	Team	Apps	(Gls)
2011–2015	VG Ballstarz		
2021–	Potros FC		

International career^{‡}
2010–	British Virgin Islands	26	(3)
- * Club domestic league appearances and goals as of 15:53, 25 March 2019 (UTC) ‡ National team caps and goals as of 8 June 2024

Troy Kavon Caesar (born 13 May 1994) is a British Virgin Islands footballer who plays as a central defender for United Premier Soccer League side Potros FC.

== Club career ==
After playing club football for VG Ballstarz, Caesar enrolled at Andrew College in 2015 where he played college soccer, making 27 appearances. After making the all-region first team for two consecutive seasons, Caesar attended Life University. In October 2021, he joined United Premier Soccer League side Potros FC.

== International career ==
Caesar made his international debut for British Virgin Islands in 2010.

== Career statistics ==
As of match played 8 June 2024

Appearances and goals by national team and year
National team	Year	Apps	Goals
British Virgin Islands	2010	2	0
British Virgin Islands	2011	2	0
British Virgin Islands	2012	4	0
British Virgin Islands	2013	0	0
British Virgin Islands	2014	4	0
British Virgin Islands	2015	0	0
British Virgin Islands	2016	2	0
British Virgin Islands	2017	0	0
British Virgin Islands	2018	3	0
British Virgin Islands	2019	3	1
British Virgin Islands	2022	2	1
British Virgin Islands	2023	4	1
British Virgin Islands	2024	3	0
Total		26	3

Scores and results list British Virgin Islands' goal tally first, score column indicates score after each Caesar goal.

List of international goals scored by Troy Caesar
No.	Date	Venue	Opponent	Score	Result	Competition
1	21 March 2019	Raymond E. Guishard Technical Centre, The Valley, Anguilla	Turks and Caicos Islands	1–0	2–2	2019–20 CONCACAF Nations League qualification
2	3 June 2022	A. O. Shirley Recreation Ground, Road Town, Anguilla	Cayman Islands	1–0	1–1	2022–23 CONCACAF Nations League C
3	9 September 2023	A. O. Shirley Recreation Ground, Road Town, Anguilla	Turks and Caicos Islands	1–0	3–1	2023–24 CONCACAF Nations League C
