= 2010–11 BVIFA National Football League =

The 2010–11 BVIFA National Football League was the 2nd season of the competition. Islanders FC won the title.

== Table ==
Final Table:

1.Islanders               16 13  2  1  66-11  41  Champions  [from Tortola]
2.Sugar Boys              16  9  3  4  44-30  30
3.Lucian Stars            16  8  3  5  36-42  27
4.One Love United         16  8  2  6  37-24  26
5.Panthers                16  7  4  5  37-30  25  [from Tortola]
6.Wolues                  16  6  3  7  30-32  21  [from Tortola]
7.Virgin Gorda United     15  4  0 11  17-47  12
8.Virgin Gorda Ballstars  15  3  2 10  19-34  11
9.Old Madrid              16  2  3 11  14-50   9

NB: abandoned match between VG United and VG Ballstars apparently declared void
