= British Virgin Islands women's national football team =

Women's national association football team representing the British Virgin Islands

British Virgin Islands
- Nickname: BVI
- Association: British Virgin Islands; Football Association
- Confederation: CONCACAF
- Head coach: James Baird
- FIFA code: VGB
| First colours | Second colours |

FIFA ranking
- Current: NR (16 June 2026)
- Highest: 141 (December 2007)
- Lowest: 188 (December 2025)

First international
- Saint Lucia 8–0 British Virgin Islands (21 May 2000)

Biggest win
- British Virgin Islands 2–0 U.S. Virgin Islands (11 March 2012)

Biggest defeat
- Cuba 21–0 British Virgin Islands (Santo Domingo Este, Dominican Republic; 3 October 2007); British Virgin Islands 0–21 Haiti (Road Town, British Virgin Islands; 9 April 2022)

The British Virgin Islands women's national football team is the national women's football team of the British Virgin Islands and is overseen by the British Virgin Islands Football Association.

== Results and fixtures ==
The following is a list of match results in the last 12 months, as well as any future matches that have been scheduled.

Legend

Win Draw Lose Fixture

=== 2025 ===
| October 24, 2025 Friendly | U.S. Virgin Islands | 8–0 | British Virgin Islands | Christiansted, U.S. Virgin Islands |
| 16:00 ET | Johanna James 3'; Kelaine Smith 14' (o.g.); Brianna Brudy 18', 25', 44'; Maia Foley 20'; Josie Couch 54'; Mackiesh Taylor-Jones 90' (pen.) | | | Stadium: Bethlehem Soccer Complex; Attendance: 95; Referee: Taylor MacDonald |

== Players ==
=== Current squad ===
The following players were called up for the match against Haiti on 9 April 2022.

| No. | Pos. | Player | Date of birth (age) | Caps | Goals | Club |
|---|---|---|---|---|---|---|
| 1 | GK | Kimberly Smith | | | | (British Virgin Islands Football Association) Wolues FC |
| 18 | GK | Britney Peters | | | | (British Virgin Islands Football Association) Avengers FC |
| 2 | DF | Zolita Bamford | | | | (British Virgin Islands Football Association) Wolues FC |
| 7 | MF | Gabrielle Jermyn | | | | (British Virgin Islands Football Association) Wolues FC |
| 15 | MF | Kiara Woodley | | | | (British Virgin Islands Football Association) Wolues FC |
| 17 | DF | Keeley Brickwood | | | | (The Football Association) Holland FC |
| 19 | DF | Shevonne Vanterpool | | | | (British Virgin Islands Football Association) Avengers FC |
| 20 | DF | Kara Lewis | | | | (British Virgin Islands Football Association) Panthers FC |
| 22 | DF | Chandni Wattley | | | | (British Virgin Islands Football Association) Panthers FC |
| 4 | MF | Zina Cheikh | | | | (The Football Association) Oakham United F.C. |
| 5 | MF | Ariel Mohamed (captain) | | | | (British Virgin Islands Football Association) Wolues FC |
| 8 | MF | Darci Reich | | | | (British Virgin Islands Football Association) Wolues FC |
| 10 | MF | Zariya Smith | | | | (British Virgin Islands Football Association) Panthers FC |
| 12 | MF | Makeda Fahie | | | | (British Virgin Islands Football Association) Avengers FC |
| 14 | MF | Kezia Gumbs | | | | (British Virgin Islands Football Association) VG United |
| 16 | MF | Olivia Messum | | | | (The Football Association) De Montfort University |
| 3 | FW | Morgan Creque | | | | (British Virgin Islands Football Association) Panthers FC |
| 6 | FW | Jackisha Rigobert | | | | (British Virgin Islands Football Association) VG Utd |
| 9 | FW | Jasmine Cox | | | | (The Football Association) Holland FC |
| 23 | FW | Alicia King | | | | (The Football Association) De Montfort University |

=== Recent call ups ===
| Pos. | Player | Date of birth (age) | Caps | Goals | Club | Latest call-up |

== Competitive record ==
=== FIFA Women's World Cup ===
FIFA Women's World Cup record
| Year | Result | GP | W | D* | L | GF | GA | GD |
|---|---|---|---|---|---|---|---|---|
| (China) 1991 | Did not enter | | | | | | | |
| (Sweden) 1995 | Did not enter | | | | | | | |
| (United States) 1999 | Did not enter | | | | | | | |
| (United States) 2003 | Did not enter | | | | | | | |
| (China) 2007 | Did not qualify | | | | | | | |
| (Germany) 2011 | Did not enter | | | | | | | |
| (Canada) 2015 | Did not enter | | | | | | | |
| (France) 2019 | Did not enter | | | | | | | |
| (Australia) (New Zealand) 2023 | Did not qualify | | | | | | | |
| (Brazil) 2027 | Did not enter | | | | | | | |
| Total | 0/10 | - | - | - | - | - | - | - |

*Draws include knockout matches decided on penalty kicks.

=== Olympic Games ===
| Summer Olympics record | | | | | | | | | Qualifying record | | | | | |
| Year | Round | Position | Pld | W | D* | L | GF | GA | Pld | W | D* | L | GF | GA |
|---|---|---|---|---|---|---|---|---|---|---|---|---|---|---|
| (United States) 1996 to (Greece) 2004 | Did not enter | | | | | | | | Did not enter | | | | | |
| (China) 2008 | Did not qualify | | | | | | | | 3 | 0 | 0 | 3 | 0 | 43 |
| (United Kingdom) 2012 | Did not enter | | | | | | | | Did not enter | | | | | |
| (Brazil) 2016 | Did not enter | | | | | | | | Did not enter | | | | | |
| (Japan) 2020 | Did not enter | | | | | | | | Did not enter | | | | | |
| (France) 2024 | Did not qualify | | | | | | | | 2022 CONCACAF W Championship | | | | | |
| (United States) 2028 | Did not enter | | | | | | | | Did not enter | | | | | |
| Total | – | – | – | – | – | – | – | – | 3 | 0 | 0 | 3 | 0 | 43 |

*Draws include knockout matches decided on penalty kicks.

=== CONCACAF W Championship ===
| CONCACAF W Championship record | | | | | | | | Qualification record | | | | | |
| Year | Result | GP | W | D* | L | GF | GA | GP | W | D* | L | GF | GA |
|---|---|---|---|---|---|---|---|---|---|---|---|---|---|
| (Haiti) 1991 | Did not enter | | | | | | | Did not enter | | | | | |
| (United States) 1993 | Did not enter | | | | | | | Did not enter | | | | | |
| (Canada) 1994 | Did not enter | | | | | | | Did not enter | | | | | |
| (Canada) 1998 | Did not enter | | | | | | | Did not enter | | | | | |
| (United States) 2000 | Did not enter | | | | | | | Did not enter | | | | | |
| (United States) (Canada) 2002 | Did not enter | | | | | | | Did not enter | | | | | |
| (United States) 2006 | Did not qualify | | | | | | | 2 | 0 | 0 | 2 | 1 | 8 |
| (Mexico) 2010 | Did not enter | | | | | | | Did not enter | | | | | |
| (United States) 2014 | Did not enter | | | | | | | Did not enter | | | | | |
| (United States) 2018 | Did not enter | | | | | | | Did not enter | | | | | |
| (Mexico) 2022 | Did not qualify | | | | | | | 4 | 0 | 0 | 4 | 1 | 44 |
| (United States) 2026 | Did not enter | | | | | | | Did not enter | | | | | |
| Total | 0/12 | - | - | - | - | - | - | 6 | 0 | 0 | 6 | 2 | 52 |

*Draws include knockout matches decided on penalty kicks.

=== CONCACAF W Gold Cup ===
| CONCACAF W Gold Cup record | | | | | | | | Qualification record | | | | | | | |
| Year | Result | GP | W | D* | L | GF | GA | Division | Group | GP | W | D* | L | GF | GA |
|---|---|---|---|---|---|---|---|---|---|---|---|---|---|---|---|
| (United States) 2024 | Did not enter | | | | | | | Did not enter | | | | | | | |
| (N/A) 2029 | To be determined | | | | | | | To be determined | | | | | | | |
| Total | – | – | – | – | – | – | – | – | – | – | – | – | – | – | – |

*Draws include knockout matches decided on penalty kicks.

=== CFU Women's Caribbean Cup ===
CFU Women's Caribbean Cup record
| Year | Result | Pld | W | D* | L | GF | GA |
|---|---|---|---|---|---|---|---|
| (Haiti) 2000 | Preliminary | 2 | 0 | 0 | 2 | 0 | 21 |
| (Trinidad and Tobago) 2014 | Did not enter | | | | | | |
| 2018 | Did not enter | | | | | | |
| Total | – | 2 | 0 | 0 | 2 | 0 | 21 |

*Draws include knockout matches decided on penalty kicks.
