= The Baths =

Beach area on the island of Virgin Gorda

The Baths National Park
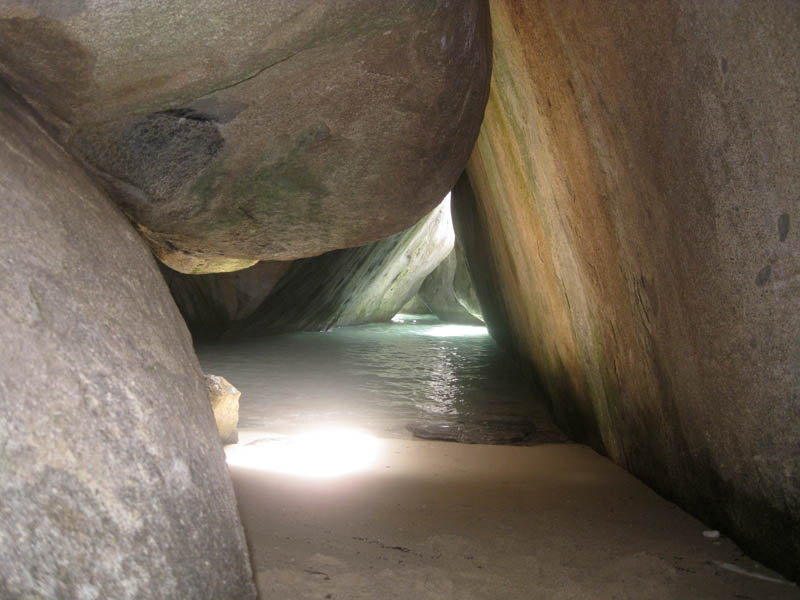
- One of many baths found among scattered granite boulders

- Location within British Virgin Islands
- Type: Natural Area
- Location: Virgin Gorda, British Virgin Islands
- Coordinates: 18°25′46″N 64°26′43″W

The Baths is a beach area on the island of Virgin Gorda among the British Virgin Islands in the Caribbean.

== Geography ==
The Baths is situated about 1.2 miles (1.9 km) south off Spanish Town at the southern tip of the island between Spring Bay and Devil's Bay. The Baths is an area of unique geologic formations (batholiths) and one of the BVI's major tourist destinations.

== Area ==
Although volcanism accounts for much of the Virgin Islands, The Baths was formed by granite that eroded into piles of boulders on the beach. Granite forms from the slow cooling of magma at depth nowhere close to surface volcanoes. The granite only appears at the surface after geologic ages have eroded away all the overburden covering it. Once exposed, erosion continued to isolate the granite into large boulders and round their surfaces. The boulders form natural tidal pools, tunnels, arches, and scenic grottoes that are open to the sea. The largest boulders are about 40 feet (12 m) long.

Since 1990, the area has been a BVI National Park as are the adjacent bays, and the area is a major tourist attraction, with swimming and snorkeling being the main attractions.

== Gallery ==
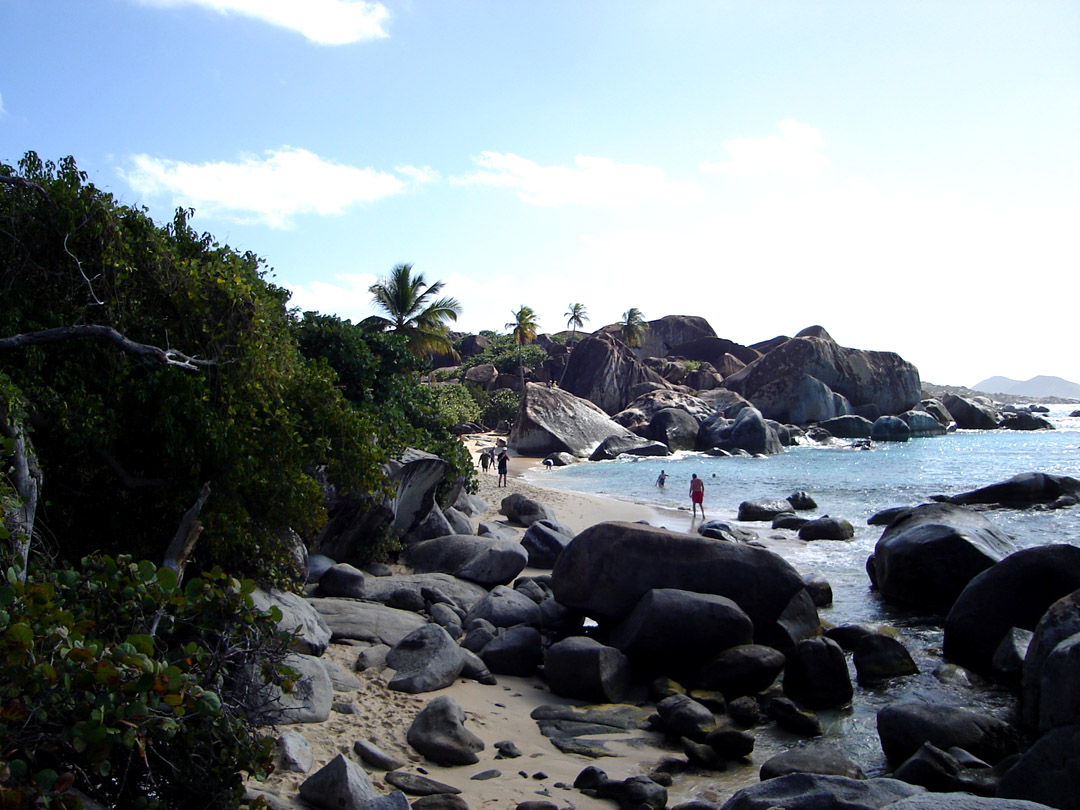
The Baths

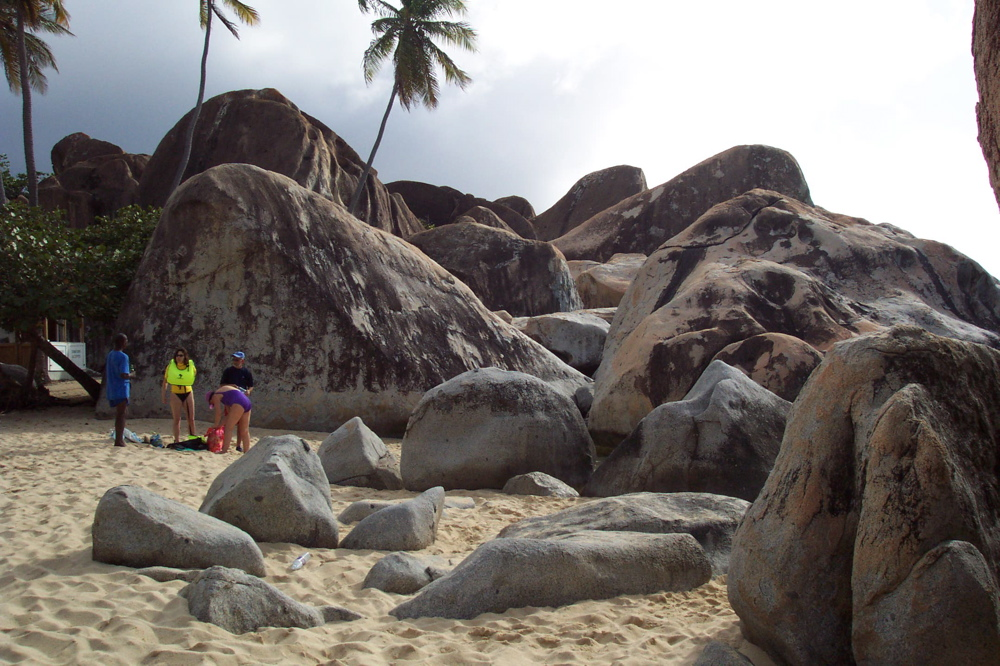
Boulders at The Baths

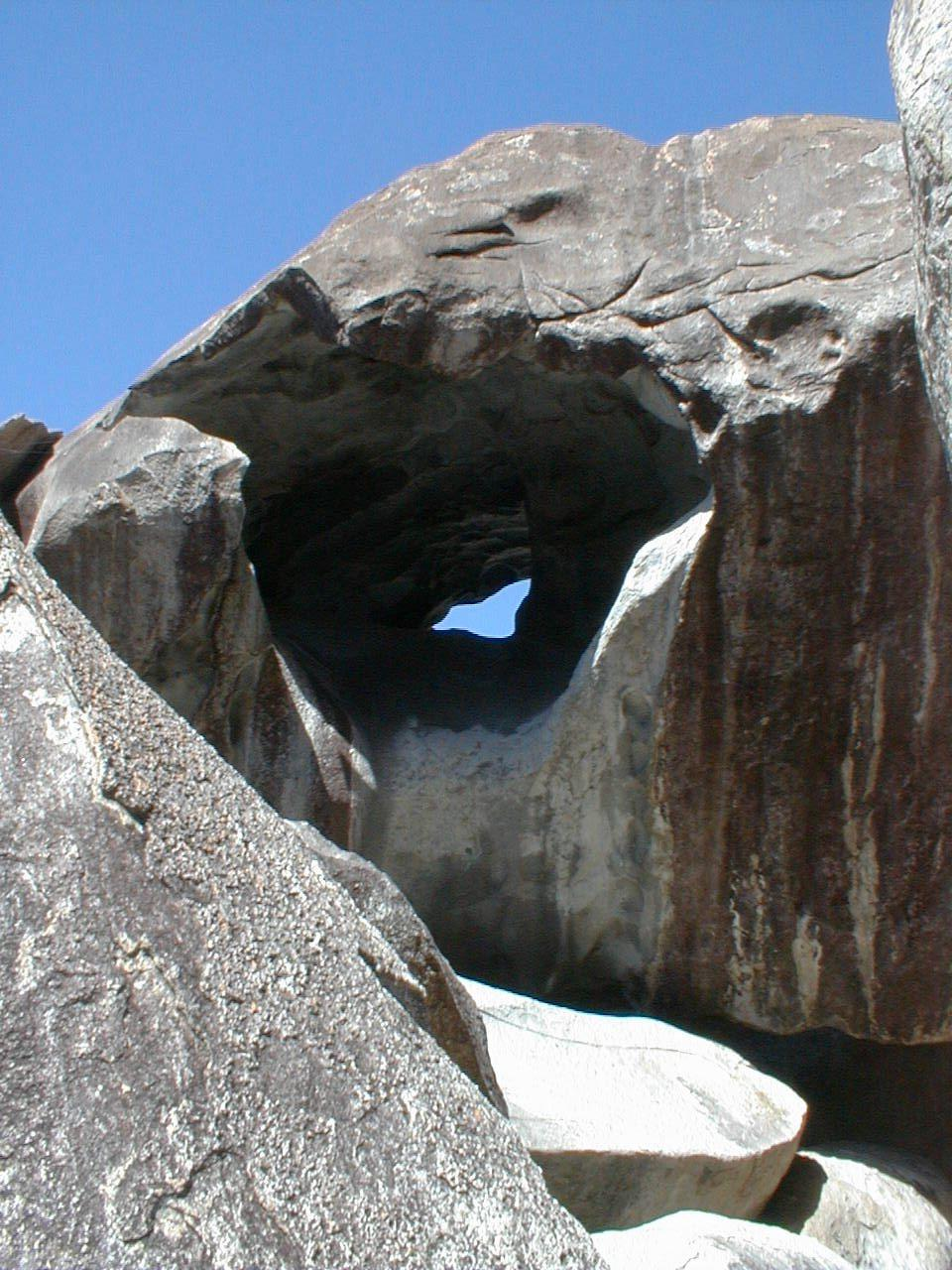
Rock formation at The Baths

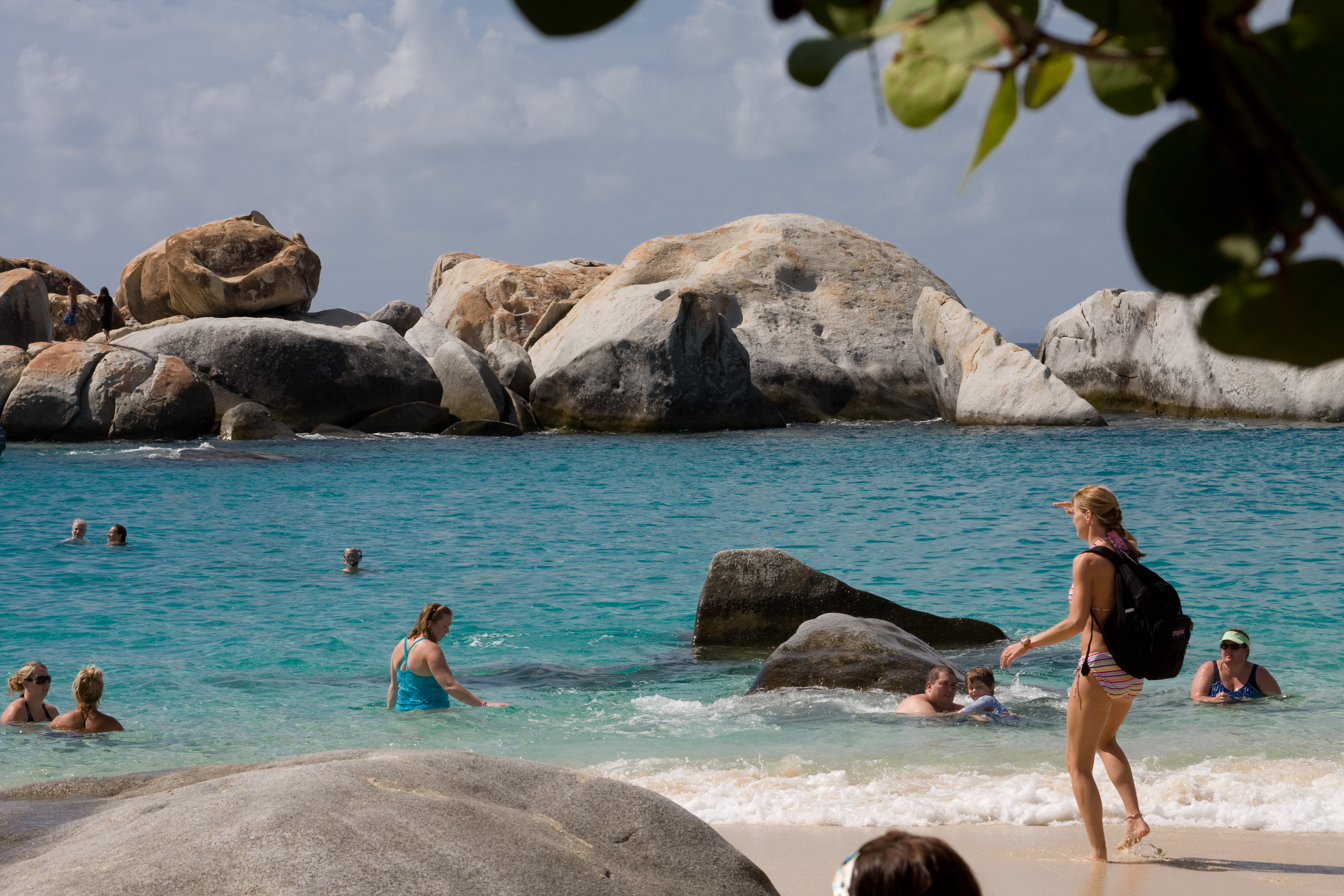
Bay area at The Baths

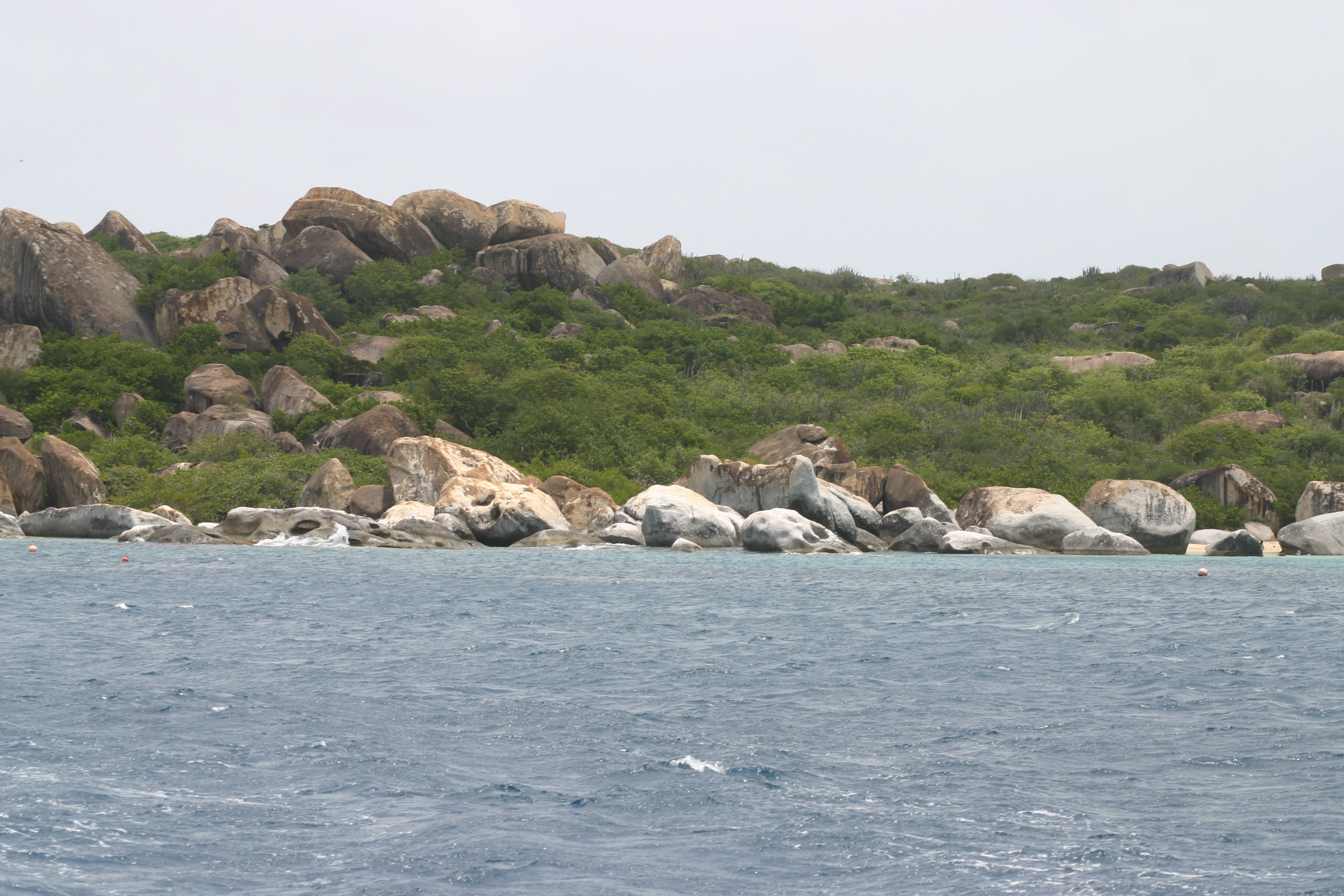
Underwater Cave at The Baths
