= VG Ballstarz =

Association football club in British Virgin Islands

- Full name: Virgin Gorda Ballstarz Football Club
- League: BVIFA Football League
- 2015–16: 8th

The Virgin Gorda Ballstarz, commonly known as VG Ballstarz is a British Virgin Islands football club that competes in the BVIFA National Football League.

== Former players ==
- (Saint Kitts and Nevis) (British Virgin Islands) Jhon Samuel (former international)
- (Saint Kitts and Nevis) (British Virgin Islands) Andreas Norford (former international)
- (British Virgin Islands) Troy Caesar
