= Avengers FC =

Football club in the British Virgin Islands

- Full name: Avengers Football Club
- Founded: 2024
- Ground: Virgin Gorda Recreation Ground; Spanish Town
- Capacity: 1000
- League: BVIFA National Football League

Avengers Football Club is a British Virgin Islands professional football club based in Spanish Town. The club competes in the BVIFA National Football League, the top tier of British Virgin Islands football.

The club was founded in 2024, increasing the number of playing teams to 11 and play their home matches in the 1,000-capacity, Virgin Gorda Recreation Ground.
