= 2018 AFA Senior Male League =

AFA Senior Male League
- Season: 2018
- Champions: Kicks United
- Caribbean Club Shield: Kicks United; Roaring Lions
- Matches: 24
- Goals: 99 (4.13 per match)
- Biggest home win: RLFC 9–0 URFC (3 Mar 2018)
- Biggest away win: DFC 0–3 KUFC (15 Apr 2018)
- Highest scoring: RLFC 9–0 URFC (3 Mar 2018)
- Longest winning run: RLFC: 7
- Longest unbeaten run: RLFC: 7
- Longest winless run: DUFC: 5
- Longest losing run: DUFC: 5

The 2018 AFA Senior Male League is the 19th season of the AFA Senior Male League, the only football league in Anguilla.

Kicks United won the league championship, winning every single one of their matches. It was the club's fifth Anguillan title, and their first since 2015.

== Standings ==
Pos	Team	Pld	W	D	L	GF	GA	GD	Pts	Qualification
1	Kicks United (C)	7	7	0	0	19	2	+17	21	Qualify for the 2019 CONCACAF Caribbean Club Shield
2	Roaring Lions	7	5	0	2	25	4	+21	15	Qualify for the 2019 CONCACAF Caribbean Club Shield
3	Enforcers (Note: Police FC were renamed Enforcers FC)	7	4	1	2	21	6	+15	13	
4	Salsa Ballers	7	4	1	2	13	7	+6	13	
5	Uprising	7	2	0	5	7	30	−23	6	
6	Diamond	7	1	2	4	8	19	−11	5	
7	ALHCS Spartan	6	1	1	4	9	17	−8	4	
8	Doc's United	6	0	1	5	6	23	−17	1	

Updated to match(es) played on 20 May 2018. Source: FIFA
(C) Champions

== Related Competitions ==
=== President's Cup ===
The pre-season President's Cup took place between 19 November and 17 December, and was won by Kicks United.
