= 2019 AFA Senior Male League =

AFA Senior Male League
- Season: 2019

The 2019 AFA Senior Male League is the 20th season of the AFA Senior Male League, the men's football league in Anguilla.

== League table ==
Pos	Team	Pld	W	D	L	GF	GA	GD	Pts	Qualification or relegation
1	ALHCS Spartan	0	0	0	0	0	0	0	0	Caribbean Club Shield
2	Diamond	0	0	0	0	0	0	0	0	
3	Doc's United	0	0	0	0	0	0	0	0	
4	Enforcers	0	0	0	0	0	0	0	0	
5	Kicks United	0	0	0	0	0	0	0	0	
6	Lymers	0	0	0	0	0	0	0	0	
7	Roaring Lions	0	0	0	0	0	0	0	0	
8	Salsa Ballers	0	0	0	0	0	0	0	0	
9	Uprising	0	0	0	0	0	0	0	0	

Updated to match(es) played on TBC 2019. Source: RSSSF
