= Lymers FC =

Anguillan football club

- Full name: Lymers Football Club
- Founded: 2018
- Ground: Raymond E. Guishard Technical Centre
- Capacity: 1,100
- Manager: Andre Griffith
- League: Anguilla Football League
- 2026: 4th
- Website: Website

Lymers FC is an Anguillan professional football club based in the capital The Valley that currently competes in the Anguilla Football League. The club was founded in 2018 and, like several other Anguillan clubs, plays its home matches at the 1,100-seat Raymond E. Guishard Technical Centre. The club also fields a team in the Anguilla U-17 Youth League founded in 2022.

== Domestic history ==
Key

Champion Runners-up 3rd Place

Season	League							Play-offs	Notes
Season	Div.	Pos.	Pl.	W	D	L	P	Play-offs	Notes
2019	1st		0	0	0	0	0		
2020	1st	6th	9	3	0	6	9		
2021	1st	5th	8	4	1	3	13		
2022	1st	2nd	10	8	1	1	25	4th	
2023	1st	6th	16	5	4	7	19		
2024	1st	6th	16	3	6	7	15		
2025	1st	8th	18	4	2	12	14		
2026	1st	4th	18	8	6	4	30	2nd	

== Notable players ==
This list of former players includes those who received international caps, made significant contributions to the team in terms of appearances or goals, or who made significant contributions to the sport. It is not complete or all inclusive, and additions and refinements will continue to be made over time.

- (Anguilla) Danniell Bailey
- (Anguilla) Damian Bailey
- (Collectivity of Saint Martin) Yannick Bellechasse
- (Anguilla) Ikenya Browne
- (Anguilla) Caleb Bryan
- (Anguilla) Glenford Hughes
- (Anguilla) Kelvin Liddie
- (Anguilla) Jaleel Scarbrough
