= Tortola League =

Former association football league in British Virgin Islands

The Tortola League was a regional association football league played in Tortola, British Virgin Islands. The winner of the league was declared as the overall champion of the country. In 2005, the league disbanded, and in 2009 it merged with the Virgin Gorda League to create a new top league, the BVIFA National League.

== Previous winners ==
- 1970: The Bronze
- 1971–78: not known
- 1979: SKB Budweiser
- 1980: Queen City Strikers
- 1981: SKB Budweiser
- 1982: International Motors
- 1983: International Motors
- 1984: SKB Budweiser
- 1985: SKB Budweiser
- 1986: SKB Budweiser
- 1987: SKB Budweiser
- 1988: League abandoned
- 1989: Popeye Bombers
- 1990: Jolly Rogers Strikers
- 1991: Hiaroun
- 1992: Hiaroun
- 1993: Interfada
- 1994: Interfada
- 1995: Interfada
- 1996: Black Lions
- 1997: BDO Binder Stingers
- 1998: Veterans
- 1999: HBA Panthers
- 2000: HBA Panthers
- 2001: Future Stars United
- 2002: HBA Panthers
- 2003: Old Madrid
- 2004: Valencia I (BVI)
- 2005: League abandoned
- 2006–present: No competition
