= Uprising FC =

Association football club in Anguilla

- Full name: Uprising Football Club
- Founded: 2015; 11 years ago
- Ground: Raymond E. Guishard Technical Centre, The Valley, Anguilla
- Capacity: 1,100
- Chairman: Tre Gumbs
- League: Anguilla Football League
- 2026: 5th
- Website: http://www.uprisingfc.com/

Uprising FC is an Anguillian professional football club based in The Valley which plays in the AFA Senior League, the top tier of anguillian football.

== History ==
The club was founded in the season 2015–16 and have been an official member of the AFA since 2021. The club is quite unique for football in Anguilla due to its committee being made up of people based on the island as well as three people from Europe. The Secretary of the club is Pascal Panitzsch from Halle in Germany whilst the Media Officer is Gareth Thomas from Shropshire in the UK. The third member of European officials is the club's Commercial Officer, Louis Jones from Lincolnshire, UK.

== Domestic achievements ==
Key

Champion Runners-up 3rd place

| Season | League | | | | | | | Domestic Cup | Notes |
| Season | Div. | Pos. | Pl. | W | D | L | P | Domestic Cup | Notes |
|---|---|---|---|---|---|---|---|---|---|
| 2017 | 1st | 7th | 3 | 1 | 0 | 3 | 3 | | |
| 2018 | 1st | 5th | 7 | 2 | 0 | 5 | 6 | | |
| 2019 | 1st | | 0 | 0 | 0 | 0 | 0 | | |
| 2020 | 1st | 8th | 9 | 2 | 1 | 6 | 7 | | |
| 2021 | 1st | 3rd | 8 | 5 | 1 | 2 | 16 | | |
| 2022 | 1st | 7th | 10 | 4 | 1 | 5 | 13 | | |
| 2023 | 1st | 7th | 16 | 4 | 3 | 9 | 15 | | |

== Honours ==
- AFL Development League: 1

Winners: 2020
Runners-Up: 2023
