= Virgin Islands Championship =

UK & US Virgin Islands League is an association football competition organized by the US Virgin Islands and the British Virgin Islands. It is played by two islands official team of each nation.

== Virgin Islands Championship teams ==
- Saint Croix (US)
- Saint Thomas (US)
- Tortola (UK)
- Virgin Gorda (UK)

== Previous winners ==
- 1996: Tortola
- 1997: St. Croix 2-2 Tortola (St Croix won 5-4 on penalties)
- 1998: St. Croix 2-0 Tortola
- 1999: unknown
- 2000: St. Thomas 2-3, 4-0 Virgin Gorda
- 2001: Tortola 5-0 Virgin Gorda
- 2002: Virgin Gorda 1-1 Tortola (Virgin Gorda won 5-3 on penalties)
- 2003: cancelled
