= Virgin Gorda League =

Former association football league in British Virgin Islands

The Virgin Gorda League was a regional association football league played in Virgin Gorda, British Virgin Islands. In 2009 the league disbanded after the merger with the Tortola League to create a new top league, the BVIFA National League.

== Previous Winners ==
- 1996: Spice United
- 1997: Beverly Hills
- 1998: United Kickers
- 1999 Not known
- 2000: Rangers
- 2001: Rangers
- 2002: Rangers
- 2003: Rangers
- 2004: Rangers
- 2005: Hairoun Stars
- 2006: Rangers
- 2007: Rangers
- 2008: Hairoun Stars
- 2009-present: no competition
