= Virgin Gorda United =

Association football club in British Virgin Islands

Virgin Gorda
- Full name: Virgin Gorda United
- Founded: 2009
- Ground: Virgin Gorda Recreation Ground; Spanish Town
- Capacity: 1,000
- Manager: Jermain Abrams
- League: BVIFA National Football League
- 2024-25: 1st, Champions
- Website: www.facebook.com/profile.php?id=100062858423840

Virgin Gorda United is a British Virgin Islands professional football club based in Spanish Town. The club competes in the BVIFA National Football League, the top tier of British Virgin Islands football.

The club was founded in 2001, and play their home matches in the 1,000-capacity, Virgin Gorda Recreation Ground.

== Stadium ==
Virgin Gorda United plays at the Virgin Gorda Recreation Ground in Spanish Town.

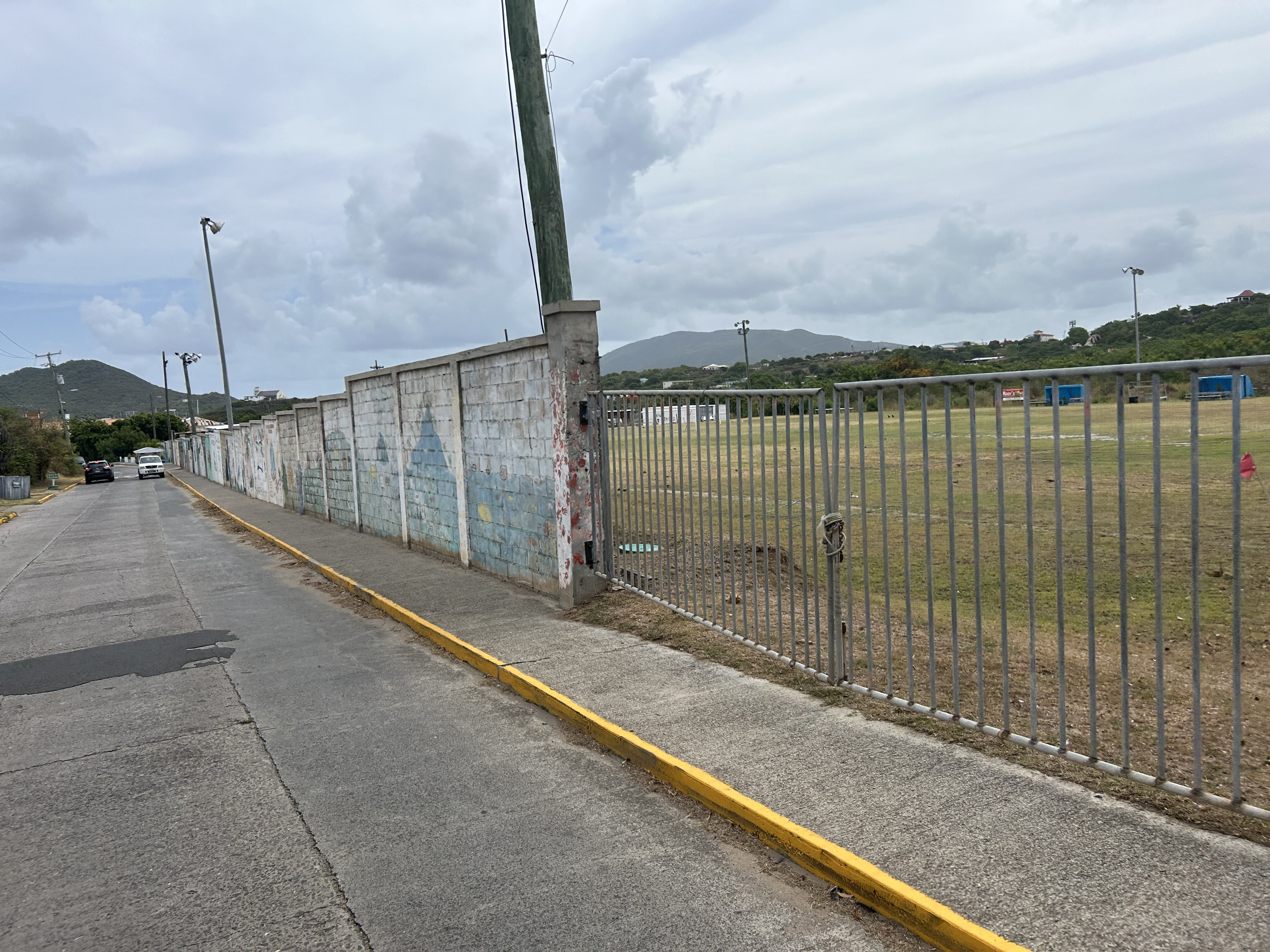

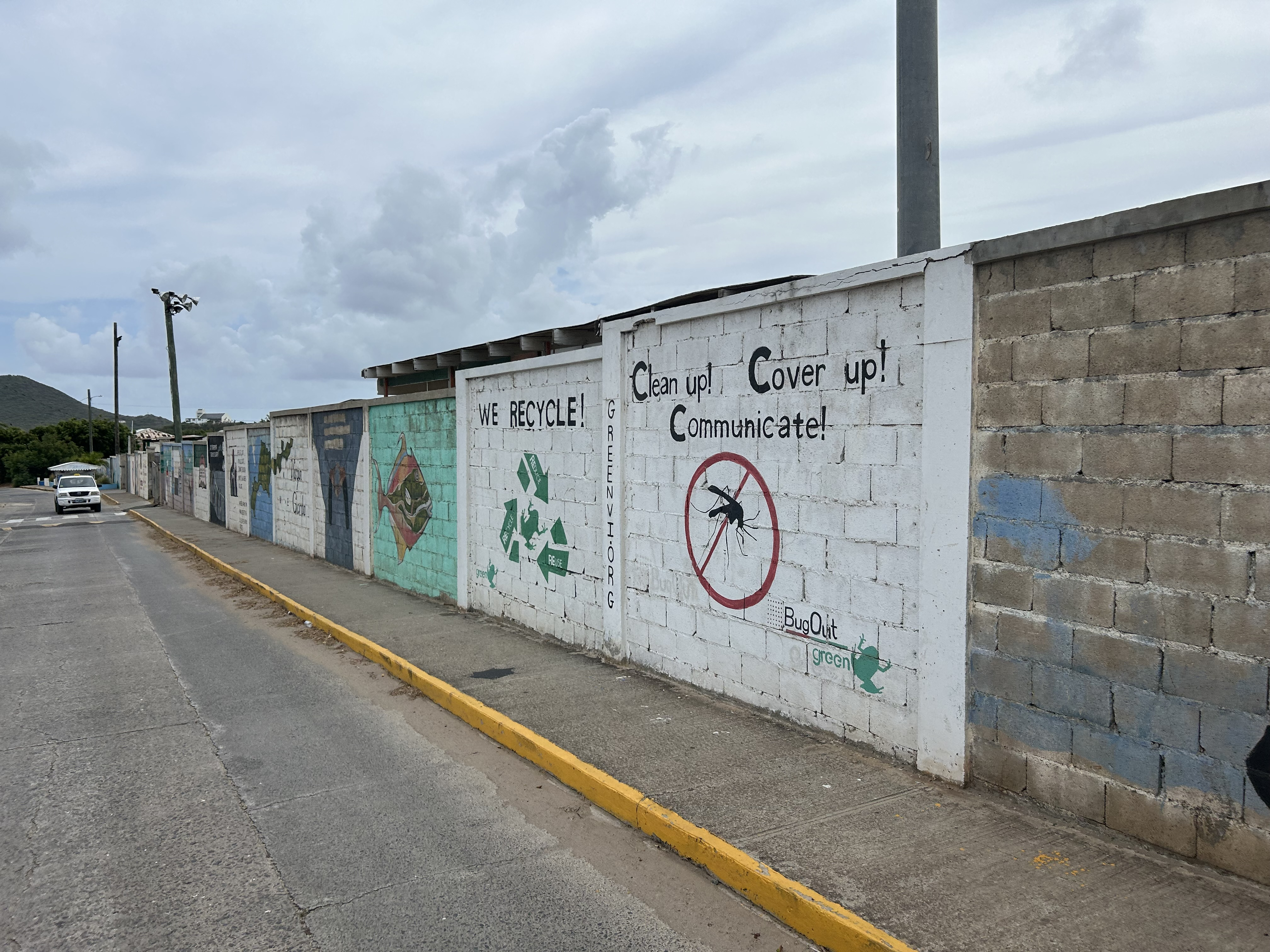

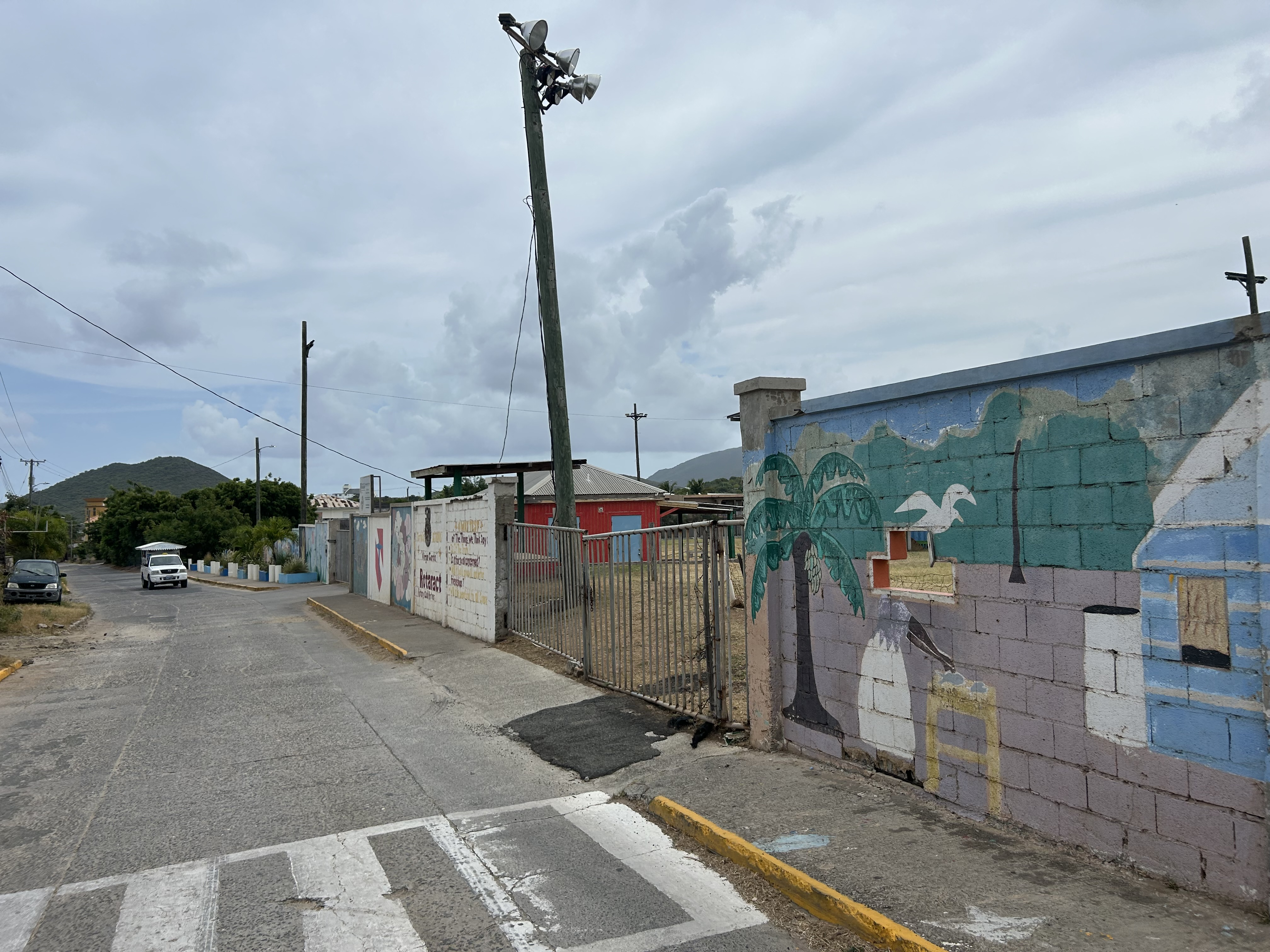

== Players ==
=== Current squad ===
As of 1 March 2025

Note: Flags indicate national team as defined under FIFA eligibility rules; some limited exceptions apply. Players may hold more than one non-FIFA nationality.

No.	Pos.	Nation	Player
—	GK	LCA	Benjamin Camille
—	GK	VGB	Daniel Gilford
—	GK	VGB	Mekhi Waters
—	DF	VGB	Jumaane Morton
—	DF	VGB	Giovanni Grant
—	DF	VGB	Troy Williams
—	DF	VGB	Jerell Frederick
—	DF	VGB	Joshua Rampersad
—	DF	VGB	Thomas Albert
—	DF	VGB	Deshawn Richardson
—	DF	VGB	Jaden Abrams
—	DF	VGB	Quelahni Nickie
—	DF	VIN	Kijuan Nimblett
—	DF	VGB	Ikyjah Williams
—	DF	VIN	Romano Nimblett
—	DF	VGB	Makimbo Demming

No.	Pos.	Nation	Player
—	DF	VGB	Marvin Browne
—	DF	VGB	T'Khoi Morton
—	DF	VGB	Latriel Williams
—	DF	VGB	Qu'yl Billingy
—	MF	VGB	Devante Samuel
—	MF	JAM	Kwai Samuel
—	MF	VGB	Adrian Padilla
—	FW	VGB	Denvin Jones
—	FW	VGB	Lance Renolds
—	FW	VGB	Jadon Abrams
—	FW	VGB	Levon Williams
—	FW	VIN	Shamar Ollivierre
—	FW	VGB	Tkhoi Richardson
—	FW	VIN	Bernard Cumberbatch
—	FW	VGB	Joel Mars
—	FW	VGB	Jaadon Quashie
