= COVID-19 pandemic in the British Virgin Islands =

- British Virgin Islands
- Disease: COVID-19
- Pathogen: SARS-CoV-2
- Location: British Virgin Islands
- First outbreak: Wuhan, China
- Arrival date: 25 March 2020 (6 years, 1 month, 3 weeks and 2 days)
- Confirmed cases: 7,661
- Recovered: 7,241
- Deaths: 64

Government website
- Government of the Virgin Islands

The global viral pandemic of coronavirus disease 2019 (COVID-19) was confirmed to have reached the British Overseas Territory of the British Virgin Islands in March 2020.

== Background ==
On 12 January 2020, the World Health Organization (WHO) confirmed that a novel coronavirus was the cause of a respiratory illness in a cluster of people in Wuhan City, Hubei Province, China, which was reported to the WHO on 31 December 2019.

The case fatality ratio for COVID-19 has been much lower than SARS of 2003, but the transmission has been significantly greater, with a significant total death toll. From 19 March, Public Health England no longer classified COVID-19 as a "High consequence infectious disease".

== Timeline ==
Cases

Deaths

=== March 2020 ===
On 25 March, the British Virgin Islands confirmed its first two cases of COVID-19. One of the patients was a 56-year-old male resident who travelled from Europe on 15 March. Patient B was a 32-year-old resident who travelled recently from New York City #BigApple and came into contact with a person who tested positive for COVID-19 on 8 March.

=== April 2020 ===
On 18 April, the first death from COVID-19 was recorded in the territory. On 27 April, the Minister of Health Carvin Malone announced that the island would buy medical supplies from non-US sources after the US Customs seized $12,000 worth of COVID-19 medical supplies. The shipment had been released on 16 April.

On 19 April, the Territory-wide 24 hour lockdown is extended by seven days.

On 30 April, the Government announced a voucher scheme to provide food for needy families.

=== May 2020 ===
The WHO reportedly classified the BVI as having "sporadic" infections on 7 May.

On 8 May, the Territory recorded its eighth infection - representing the "peak" of infections so far.

On 26 May, Health Authorities announced that there are zero confirmed cases of COVID-19 in the Territory. However they warn that "the fight is not over".

=== July 2020 ===
On 30 July the Government issued a further curfew order (the 25th of the year) further extending the curfew relating to COVID-19 until 13 August. The curfew is from midnight to 6am.

=== August 2020 ===
After a lengthy period during which the Territory was COVID-19 free, a ninth positive case was announced on 1 August.

On 3 August the Government issued a directive barring work permit holders and work permit exempt persons from returning to the Territory indefinitely.

On 14 August the Government ended the curfew which had been in place for five months.

Two new cases were diagnosed on 17 August.

A further nine new cases were diagnosed on 21 August, leading the Government to reimpose curfew restrictions. The rise in infections was blamed by the Government on people re-entering the Territory illegally from the neighbouring U.S. Virgin Islands to evade mandatory quarantine restrictions.

A further five new cases were announced on 25 August, and the Government reimposed a partial lockdown in the Territory on 26 August. A further nine new cases were announced on 28 August, effectively trebling the total number of cases in just a few days.

=== September 2020 ===
The British Virgin Islands imposed territory-wide 1301-0500 daily curfew from 2–16 September. Only workers in essential and critical services are exempt from the curfew. The curfew was extended to 1 October and included a ban on boats entering or leaving the territory without permission, confirmed cases stand at 71.

=== October 2020 ===
As no new cases had been reported and there were no active cases, businesses could re-open, including bars; however, a midnight to 5 am curfew continued until 22 October.

== Lockdown ==
Like many countries, the British Virgin Islands imposed restrictions on movement of citizens, and limited international access into and out of the Territory, to try to control the spread of the virus.

The BVI initially imposed a three-day 24-hour lockdown from 8 pm on March 27 to 6 am on April 2. This was then extended for a further period of two weeks from April 2, and then it was further extended by an additional seven days, ultimately ending on April 25 after thirty days. That was replaced with a 17-hour curfew, and residents could only leave their homes from 6 am to 1 pm.

On May 10, the extensive curfew was replaced by a more moderated curfew from 7 pm to 6 am. Two days before it expired, the curfew was extended until June 6.

Public beaches were opened (subject to restrictions) on May 10.

Borders were closed until June 2, but persons travelling to the Territory were required to spend 14 days in quarantine after arrival.

== See also ==
- Caribbean Public Health Agency
- 2020 in the Caribbean
- Influx of disease in the Caribbean
- HIV/AIDS in Latin America
- 2013–2014 chikungunya outbreak
- 2009 swine flu pandemic
- 2019–2020 dengue fever epidemic
- COVID-19 pandemic in North America
