= Spanish Town, British Virgin Islands =

Settlement in the British Virgin Islands

Spanish Town
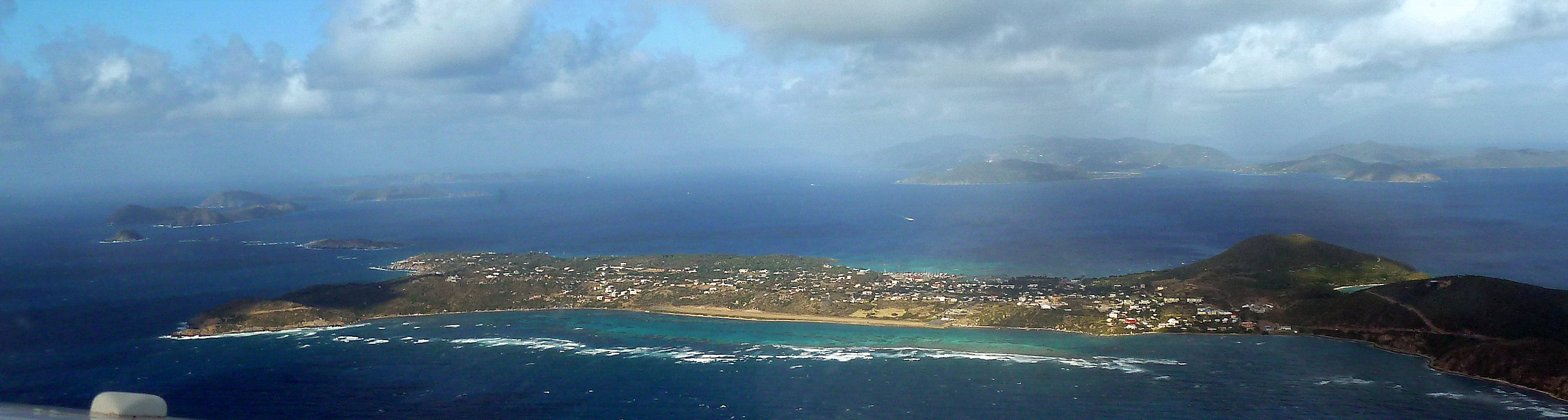
- Interactive map of Spanish Town
- Coordinates: 18.449°N 64.431°W
- Country: British Virgin Islands

Spanish Town on southern Virgin Gorda is the second largest town (after Road Town) on the British Virgin Islands. Also known as Valley, Spanish Town offers numerous shopping possibilities. The heart of the town is its Yacht Harbor marina, with many bareboat sailing activities every day. It has its own airport and a ferry service is in operation from here to Road Town on Tortola and Trellis Bay on Beef Island. Overall, though, Spanish Town is small, with few bars and a relaxed atmosphere. The national park "The Baths" is located south of Spanish Town.

== History ==
Spanish Town was originally settled by Cornish miners, and ruins of the chimney, boiler house, cistern, and mine shafts can be seen. This is now part of the Copper Mine National Park. It served as capital of the territory from 1680 until 1741, when the government moved its offices to Road Town.

== Events ==
Each year in March at Fishers' Cove in Spanish Town there is the Spanish Town Fisherman's Jamboree, an annual event celebrating fishing. The main focus is on the fishing competitions which also provide plenty of opportunities for visitors to try freshly caught seafood.
