= BVIFA National Football League =

Association football league in British Virgin Islands

- Founded: 20 September 2009
- Country: British Virgin Islands
- Confederation: CONCACAF
- Number of clubs: 11
- Level on pyramid: 1
- Domestic cup(s): President's Cup; FA Cup; Emmet Caines Pre-Season Knockout Tournament
- International cup: CFU Club Shield
- Current champions: Lion Heart FC (2025–26)
- Most championships: Islanders FC (8)
- Website: http://bvifootball.com/
- Current: 2025–26 BVIFA National Football League

The BVIFA National Football League is the highest level football league in the British Virgin Islands. The league was founded in 2009 after the merger between the Tortola League and the Virgin Gorda League.

== History ==
Originally, there were two separate leagues in the British Virgin Islands, one located in Virgin Gorda and the other in Tortola. In 2009, the two leagues merged creating the BVIFA National Football League. The first season in 2009-10 was contested by 8 teams with the top 4 contesting for playoffs to decide the league winner. The inaugural champions of the league were Islanders FC.

== Format ==
As of the 2024–25 season, the National Football League is contested by 11 teams. Each team plays home and away against teams against all other teams in the league for a total of 20 fixtures each season. The top four finishing clubs qualify for next season's President's Cup, which is held before the start of next season.

== Current members ==
These are the clubs taking part in the 2024–25 BVIFA National Football League.

Locations of 2024–25 BVIFA National Football League stadiums within the British Virgin Islands.
- Islanders FC
- Old Madrid FC
- Panthers FC
- Rebels FC
- Lion Heart FC
- Sugar Boys FC
- Positive FC
- VG United
- Wolues FC
- One Love FC
- Avengers FC

== Champions ==
Ed.	Season	Champion
1	2009–10	Islanders FC
2	2010–11	Islanders FC
3	2011–12	Islanders FC
4	2012–13	Islanders FC
5	2013–14	Islanders FC
6	2014–15	Islanders FC (9-a-side)
7	2015–16	Sugar Boys (9-a-side)
8	2016–17	Islanders FC
9	2017–18	One Love United FC
	2018–2019	Not Held
10	2019–20	Islanders FC
11	2020–21	Sugar Boys
12	2021–22	Sugar Boys
13	2022–23	One Love United FC
14	2023–24	Wolues
15	2024–25	Virgin Gorda United
16	2025–26	Lion Heart FC

== Titles by club ==
Club	Titles	Seasons won
Islanders FC	8	2009–10, 2010–11, 2011–12, 2012–13, 2013–14, 2014–15*, 2016–17, 2019–20
Sugar Boys	3	2015–16*, 2021, 2021–22
One Love United FC	2	2018, 2022–23
Wolues	1	2023–24
Virgin Gorda United	1	2024–25
Lion Heart FC	1	2025–26

- * 9-a-side tournaments 2014-2016

== Domestic Cup ==
There are three domestic cup competitions played over the league season, one prior and two during. They are the FA Cup founded in 2024 (renamed President's Cup in 2026), the Emmet Caines Pre-Season Knockout Tournament founded in 2023 and the President's Cup founded in 2016 (renamed BVIFA SuperCup in 2026). The President's Cup is played at the end of each season between the top 4 of the league.

=== President's Cup ===
Year	Winner	Runner-up
2016–17	Sugar Boys	Islanders FC
2017–18	Sugar Boys	Wolues FC
2020–21	Islanders FC	Sugar Boys
2021–22	Sugar Boys	Panthers FC
2022–23	Wolues FC	Virgin Gorda United
2023–24	Virgin Gorda United	Wolues FC
2024–25	Virgin Gorda United	Wolues FC
2025–26	Virgin Gorda United	Panthers FC

=== FA Cup ===
Year	Winner	Runner-up
2023–24	Virgin Gorda United	Wolues FC
2024–25	Virgin Gorda United	Sugar Boys FC
2025–26	Virgin Gorda United	Wolues FC

=== Emmet Caines Pre-Season Knockout Tournament ===
Year	Winner	Runner-up
2023–24	Virgin Gorda United	One Love United

== Top goalscorers ==
Season	Goalscorer	Club	Goals
2009–10	(British Virgin Islands) Henroy Mitchell	Islanders FC	12
2021–22	(Dominica) Wayne Phillip	Panthers	24
2022–23	(British Virgin Islands) Johari Lacey	Rebelds	22
2022–23	(Grenada) Derrol Redhead	Sugar Boys	22
2023–24	(British Virgin Islands) Hugo Liziário	Wolues	25
2024–25	(Dominica) Nigel Sanderson	Panthers	28

== Multiple hat-tricks ==
Rank	Country	Player	Hat-tricks
1	(British Virgin Islands)	Phillip Nelson	4
2	(British Virgin Islands)	Marcus Robinson	3
3	(British Virgin Islands)	Kelvin Glasgow	2
3	(England)	Kieran Bown	2
3	(British Virgin Islands)	Hugo Costa Liziario	2
3	(Barbados)	Bernard Cumberbatch	2
3	(British Virgin Islands)	Oswort Holder	2
3	(British Virgin Islands)	Johary Lacey	2
3	(Saint Vincent and the Grenadines)	Collin Lavia	2
3	(British Virgin Islands)	Joel Mars	2
3	(British Virgin Islands)	Shyane Prince	2
3	(British Virgin Islands)	Jaadon Quashie	2
3	(Saint Vincent and the Grenadines)	Bishon Richards	2
3	(Saint Vincent and the Grenadines)	Antonio Rodney	2
15	(British Virgin Islands)	Prevell Asson	1
15	(Jamaica)	Tyrone Buddah	1
15	(British Virgin Islands)	Maxwell Clark	1
15	(British Virgin Islands)	Joel Gilford	1
15		Dylano Liverpool	1
15	(Jamaica)	Noel Maxwell	1
15	(Jamaica)	Gregory Morgan	1
15	(British Virgin Islands)	Adrian Padilla	1
15	(British Virgin Islands)	Charles Pierre	1
15	(British Virgin Islands)	John Samuel	1
15	(Colombia)	Alejandro Sanchez	1
15	(British Virgin Islands)	Sheldon Tony	1
15	(British Virgin Islands)	Levon Williams	1
