= Rebels FC =

Association football club in British Virgin Islands

- Full name: Rebels Football Club
- Short name: Rebels
- Founded: 2009
- Ground: A. O. Shirley Recreation Ground; Road Town
- Capacity: 1,500
- Chairman: Froy Gibson
- Manager: Mecheil Truesdale
- League: BVIFA National Football League

Rebels FC is a British Virgin Islands professional football club based in Road Town. The club competes in the BVIFA National Football League, the top tier of British Virgin Islands football.

The club was founded in 2009, and play their home matches in the 1,500-capacity, A. O. Shirley Recreation Ground.
