= One Love United FC =

Association football club in British Virgin Islands

- Full name: One Love United Football Club
- Ground: A. O. Shirley Recreation Ground; Road Town, British Virgin Islands
- Capacity: 1,500
- League: BVIFA Football League
| Home colours | Away colours |

One Love United FC is a British Virgin Islands professional football club based in Road Town, British Virgin Islands, competing in the BVIFA National League, the top tier of British Virgin Islands football.

In 2013–14, One Love United were runners-up of the BVIFA National League.
