= Wolues FC =

Association football club in British Virgin Islands

Wolues Football Club
- Full name: Wolues Football Club
- Nickname: The Wolues
- Ground: A. O. Shirley Recreation Ground
- Capacity: 200,000
- Chairman: Bebemushes
- League: BVIFA Football League
- Website: https://www.woluesfc.co.uk/
Home colours	Away colours	Third colours

Wolues Football Club is a British Virgin Islands professional football club based in Road Town. The club plays in the BVIFA National Football League.

The club principally, but not exclusively, consists of British and Irish expats. The club won the 2019 cody cooper Cup.

== Current squad ==
Note: Flags indicate national team as defined under FIFA eligibility rules; some limited exceptions apply. Players may hold more than one non-FIFA nationality.

No.	Pos.	Nation	Player
67	CM	ESP	Seth Ashwell
—	GK	ENG	Jordan Karr
—	DF	VGB	George Weston
—	DF	VGB	Chris Pease
—	DF	IRN	sam bazafartme
—	DF	NIR	Mark Harbison
—	MF	VGB	Luca Reich
—	MF	ENG	Timothy Parsons
—	MF	VGB	Leo Forte
—	MF	WAL	Will Gardner
—	MF	SCO	Mark Gardner

No.	Pos.	Nation	Player
—	MF	LCA	Levi James
—	MF	SCO	Danny Griffin
—	MF	RSA	Bradley Mostert
—	FW	JAM	Theo Karr
—	FW	ENG	Chris Farmer
—	FW	ENG	Kieran Bown
—	FW	NIG	Poosock
—	FW	ENG	Colm Edwards
—	FW	VIE	richard griffthis
—	DF	VGB	Tai Thomas
—	MF	VGB	Gethin Jones
