= British Virgin Islands Football Association =

Governing body of football in the British Virgin Islands

CONCACAF
- Short name: BVIFA
- Founded: 1974
- Headquarters: Tortola
- FIFA affiliation: 1996
- CONCACAF affiliation: 1994 (Associate member), 1996
- President: Avanell Morton
- Website: http://bvifootball.com/

The British Virgin Islands Football Association is the governing body of football in the British Virgin Islands.The Association is also responsible for the British Virgin Islands men's national football team and its women's counterpart. It was founded in 1974.

== History ==
Prior to the British Virgin Islands forming a local football association, an unofficial football league was started in the colony organised by the Royal Engineers regiment of the British Army. The British Virgin Islands Football Association was founded in 1974. In 1994, they were granted membership of the North American football governing body CONCACAF. After two years, they applied for membership of FIFA, which was granted. Shortly after, FIFA amended their statutes in 1996 and 2004 to state that only independent countries could be members. The British Virgin Islands Football Association, despite being a British Overseas Territory, remained members due to having joined before the changes. The BVI Football Association is independent of the government but works alongside them in promoting football. In 2019, they leased Crown land to construct Greenland Stadium as a new football ground for the BVI. The construction of the stands were funded by a grant from FIFA.

== Association staff ==
Name	Position	Source
(British Virgin Islands) Avanell Morton	President	
(British Virgin Islands) Andy Davis	Vice-president	
(British Virgin Islands) Lorrelle Abrams	2nd Vice-president	
(Saint Vincent and the Grenadines) Juliana Luke	General Secretary	
(British Virgin Islands) Kenrick Grant	Treasurer	
(British Virgin Islands) Priya Mohamed	Director	
(Grenada) Craig Grant	Director	
(British Virgin Islands) Wendell Nichols	Director	
(Trinidad and Tobago) Paul Decle	Technical Director	
(Spain) David Pérez	Head Coach (National Teams)	
(Scotland) James Baird	Head Coach (Women's team)	
(British Virgin Islands) Alison Scatliffe	Marketing/Communications Coordinator	
(British Virgin Islands) Norval Young	Head/Director of the Referees Department	
(British Virgin Islands) Norval Young	Referee Coordinator	

== Competitions ==
The BVIFA oversees the administration of British Virgin Islands's football leagues; the BVIFA National Football League, BVIFA Women's League, BVIFA National Youth Leagues and the BVIFA Futsal League as well as the FA Cup, FA Presidents Cup, Super 6 and other BVIFA Sanctioned Tournaments.

== See also ==
- Sport in the British Virgin Islands
- British Virgin Islands Athletics Association
- British Virgin Islands Olympic Committee
