= Panthers FC =

Association football club in British Virgin Islands

Panthers
- Full name: Panthers Football Club
- Nickname: Police
- Short name: Panthers FC
- Founded: 1993
- Ground: A. O. Shirley Recreation Ground; Road Town
- Capacity: 1,500
- President: Linda Magloire
- Manager: Tevern David
- Coach: Stany Francis Jr
- League: BVIFA National Football League
- 2025–26: 4th

Panthers Football Club, formerly known as HBA Panthers, is a British Virgin Islands football club based in Road Town, Tortola. Founded in 1993, the club plays in the BVIFA National Football League. It won the Tortola League in 1999–2000, 2000–2001, and finished runners-up in the 2021–22 President's Cup Final vs . Sugar Boys. During the 2015–16 BVIFA National Football League, the Panthers finished third.

As 2000 Tortola League champions, it was the first British Virgin Islands club entered in the CFU Club Championship, withdrawing before its 2001 tie with SV Transvaal.

== History ==
Panthers Football Club was founded in 1993 in East End, Tortola, and was originally recorded as HBA Panthers FC. In the Tortola League, then the main competition on the island, the club finished runners-up in 1998–99, losing the final 3–1 to Veterans, and won the league in 1999–2000, 2000–01 and 2002.

As 2000 Tortola League champions, HBA Panthers were the first British Virgin Islands club entered in the CFU Club Championship. In the 2001 first round they were drawn against S.V. Transvaal of Suriname and withdrew before the tie, so Transvaal advanced on a walkover.

The Tortola League was not played after the abandoned 2005 season. In 2009 it and the Virgin Gorda League were replaced by the BVIFA National Football League, and Panthers were one of the founding clubs. The club has not won the national league. Its best finish is second, in the President's Cup in 2021–22. It also finished third in the 9-a-side 2015–16 season and fourth in 2019–20, 2021, 2024–25 and 2025–26.

== Players ==
Nigel Sanderson was the league’s top scorer in 2024–25 with 28 goals. On 7 July 2024, in his first match back after more than two years away, he scored five in a 6–1 FA Cup win over Positive at East End/Long Look. Wayne Phillip was the top scorer in 2021–22 with 24 goals. Romario Williams scored both goals in Panthers’ 2–0 win over Lion Heart on 19 October 2025.

Stany Francis was the coach in July 2024.

Romario Williams was the 2025–26 top scorer with 31 goals. Goalkeeper Pascal Parkins won the 2025–26 Golden Glove.

== League record ==
=== Tortola League ===
HBA Panthers won the Tortola League in 1999–2000, 2000–01 and 2002.

Season	Result	Notes
1998–99	Runners-up	Lost the final 3–1 to Veterans (Road Town)
1999–2000	Champions	
2000–01	Champions	
2002	Champions	
2003	—	Old Madrid won the league
2004	—	Valencia I won the league

=== BVIFA National League ===
Before 2009, association football in the British Virgin Islands was organised in two separate island leagues, the Tortola League and the Virgin Gorda League. The Tortola League champion was treated as the national champion. In 2009 the British Virgin Islands Football Association merged the competitions into the BVIFA National Football League, which became the territory’s top division. The first season, 2009–10, was the first with equal status for clubs from both islands. It had eight teams, three from Tortola and five from Virgin Gorda. Regular-season matches were played on Virgin Gorda, and the championship play-off was held on Tortola. The top four clubs entered the play-offs. Islanders FC, from Tortola, won the inaugural title. The following season, 2010–11, was the first in which league matches were played on both Tortola and Virgin Gorda in the same season.

Season	Division	Position	Pld	W	D	L	GF	GA	Pts	Notes
2010–11	National League	5th								
2011–12	National League	9th								
2012–13	National League	7th								
2014–15	National League	7th							9-a-side	
2015–16	National League	3rd							9-a-side	
2016–17	National League	7th								
2018	National League	5th								
2019–20	National League	4th								
2021	National League	4th								
2021–22	National League	2nd	18	11	1	6	52	31	34	
2022–23	National League	7th								
2023–24	National League	8th	18	5	3	10	36	56	18	
2024–25	National League	4th	20	11	5	4	70	32	38	
2025–26	National League	4th	20	11	5	4	73	21	38	

In 2025–26 Panthers led the table in February after a 2–0 win over One Love United, having already beaten the defending champions Virgin Gorda United 4–1 away. They finished fourth, behind Lion Heart, Islanders and Virgin Gorda United, and were the league’s highest scorers.

== Cups ==
Panthers reached the final of the 2021–22 President's Cup, the end-of-season competition for the top four. They beat Wolues 5–0 in the semi-final, with two goals each from Nigel Sanderson and Wayne Phillips and one from John Julio Samuel Labega, then lost the final 2–0 to Sugar Boys.

In the 2024–25 President's Cup they lost the semi-final 3–2 to Virgin Gorda United.

The top-four competition was played in 2026 as the BVIFA Super Cup. Panthers drew 2–2 with Lion Heart in the semi-final and won 4–3 on penalties, then lost the final 1–0 to Virgin Gorda United on 24 May 2026 at the A. O. Shirley Recreation Ground. Sheldon Toney scored in second-half stoppage time.

In the June 2026 President's Cup, an all-club knockout, Panthers lost 2–0 to One Love United in the quarter-final. Nigel Sanderson was sent off in the 89th minute for serious foul play.

== Continental record ==
As 2000 Tortola League champions, HBA Panthers were drawn in the first round of the 2001 CFU Club Championship against S.V. Transvaal of Suriname. The club withdrew before the tie, and Transvaal advanced on a walkover.

Season	Competition	Round	Club	Result
2001	CFU Club Championship	First round	S.V. Transvaal	Withdrew

== Honours ==
Tortola League

- Winners (3): 1999–2000, 2000–01, 2002
- Runners-up (1): 1998–99

President's Cup

- Runners-up (1): 2021–22

BVIFA Super Cup

- Runners-up (1): 2026
