= Sugar Boys FC =

Association football club in British Virgin Islands

- Full name: Sugar Boys Football Club
- Founded: 2007
- Ground: Shirley Recreation Ground, Road Town
- Capacity: 2,000
- League: BVIFA Football League

Sugar Boys FC is a British Virgin Islands professional football club based in Virgin Gorda, competing in the BVIFA Football League, the top tier of British Virgin Islands football.

Sugar Boys finished second in the 2010–11 season. Sugar Boys also finished second in the 2011–12 season on both occasions the Islanders team were victors.

== Achievements ==
- BVIFA National League: 3

2015-16, 2021, 2021-22.

- BVIFA Presidents Cup: Winners: 2

2016-17, 2021-22.

The Sugar Boys put the disappointment of losing out on the 2016–17 National League Championship by beating the Islanders 1–0, to win the Presidents Cup in front of a packed vociferous crowd at the A.O. Shirley Ground on Sunday 12 February 2017.
