= A. O. Shirley Recreation Ground =

Cricket ground in British Virgin Islands

- Interactive map of A. O. Shirley Recreation Ground
- Location: Road Town; British Virgin Islands
- Coordinates: 18°25′35″N 64°37′15″W
- Capacity: 1,500

Tenant
- British Virgin Islands national football team

The AO Shirley Recreation Ground is a multi-use stadium in Road Town, British Virgin Islands. It is currently used mostly for football matches and usually hosts the British Virgin Islands national football team's games. The stadium holds 1,500 people.

== History ==
The Ground was named in honor of Alexander O. Shirley in June 1990. Shirley, a cricketer who also served as the Accountant General of the British Virgin Islands from 1967 to 1987, had requested land to build the ground from the Administrator of the British Virgin Islands. Shirley remains the only British Virgin Islander to have a ground named for him. The ground has traditionally been open for free for public recreation when its not used for formal sports matches. In 2022, it was reported that the Recreation Trust had locked the gates of the only entrance to the stadium and wanted to charge the public $30 a month to use the facilities. However, the Trust stated it was only a proposal and there had not been a public consultation on it.

== Cricket ==
A. O. Shirley Recreation Ground
- Interactive map of A. O. Shirley Recreation Ground

Ground information
- Coordinates: 18°25′35″N 64°37′15″W

International information

The ground has also been used as a venue for cricket matches, with the first recorded cricket match played there in 1988 between a Combined Virgin Islands and Nevis. Three years later, the British Virgin Islands cricket team first played there against Anguilla in the 1991 Leeward Islands Tournament. Just over a decade later, the Leeward Islands played a first-class match there against the Windward Islands in the 2001/02 Busta Cup. This is the only first-class match to be played at the ground. The last recorded cricket match played there was in 2005. The ground's end names are the Police Station End and the Super Value End.
