= Islanders FC =

Association football club in British Virgin Islands

- Full name: Islanders Football Club
- Ground: A. O. Shirley Recreation Ground
- Capacity: 1,500
- League: BVIFA Football League

Islanders FC is a British Virgin Islands professional football club based in Tortola, competing in the BVIFA National League, the top tier of British Virgin Islands football.

Islanders FC are the current defending league champions and are the most successful football club of all time from the BVI.

== Achievements ==
- BVIFA National League: 7

2009–10, 2010–11, 2011–12, 2012–13, 2013–14, 2014–15, 2016–17.
