= MLS Caribbean Combine =

Annual showcase of Caribbean football talent

The Major League Soccer Caribbean Combine is an annual showcase of Caribbean football talent between the ages of 18 and 21 organized jointly by Major League Soccer and the Caribbean Football Union in 2013, with the inaugural combine being held in January 2014. All 31 member associations are encouraged to send representatives that fit the criteria. The combine provides opportunities for Caribbean players to be observed by MLS scouts with the hopes of being invited to the MLS Combine, an invite-only showcase event held in Fort Lauderdale, Florida prior to the annual MLS SuperDraft. The combine is part of an agreement between the two entities as they try to promote football development throughout the Caribbean region. About the impact of Caribbean players on the league, MLS Technical Director Alfonso Mondelo said, "Quite a few players have played, continue to play in the MLS and have done so successfully...Now we are looking forward to the next generation of players who will be coming in", while MLS Executive Vice President Todd Durbin said, "We recognize that the CONCACAF area, and particularly the Caribbean, is rich with soccer talent, and this will be an opportunity for our scouts to evaluate and identify the region’s top players...Caribbean players from islands like Jamaica, Haiti, Grenada and others have been key performers in MLS. This event will help recognize the next generation of MLS stars as we look to achieve our goal of being among the best leagues in the world by 2022." From a Caribbean perspective, CFU President Gordon Derrick stated, "As CFU Member Associations turn their attention to Russia 2018, this is an exciting developmental opportunity for the opulent young talent in the Caribbean to assess their developmental level and the growth required to play at the highest level...This partnership with MLS is another way in which we at the CFU are seeking to bridge the gap that exists between talent availability and scouting opportunities that the Caribbean region has received from professional leagues."

== 2014 ==
The 2014 Caribbean Combine took place at the Antigua Recreation Ground in St. John’s, Antigua from January 2–4; and featured 24 players from 16 different Caribbean nations. Originally 32 players were nominated but eight were not invited to the final combine by the MLS technical team. The Trinidad and Tobago Football Association did not have any representatives at the combine after an "administrative error" led to no paperwork being submitted to the CFU by the association. Of the 23 players who were invited, only Stefano Rijssel and Quinton Christina were invited to the MLS Combine. Rijssel went on to be the first ever player from the Caribbean Combine to be drafted after he was selected in the 3rd round, 55th overall, by Seattle Sounders FC. However, Rijssel was cut by the team during preseason and was ultimately not signed.

=== Players ===
Name	Nationality	Date of birth	Position	Notes
Damian Bailey	Anguilla	5 May 1991 (aged 22)	D/M	
Quinton Griffith	Antigua and Barbuda	27 February 1992 (aged 21)	D/M	
Stefan Smith	Antigua and Barbuda	11 August 1989 (aged 24)	F	
Leroy Oehlers	Aruba	12 December 1992 (aged 21)	D	
Drewonde Bascome	Bermuda	17 November 1992 (aged 21)	M	
Kavon Troy Ceasar	British Virgin Islands	13 May 1994 (aged 19)	D	
Ramon Sealy	Cayman Islands	22 April 1991 (aged 22)	GK	
Quinton Christina	Curaçao	3 May 1995 (aged 18)	D/F	Selected for MLS Combine
Malcolm Joseph	Dominica	10 October 1993 (aged 20)	D	
Delbert Graham	Dominica	2 July 1993 (aged 20)	M	
Vladimir Pascal	Guadeloupe	27 May 1992 (aged 21)	F/M	
Steven Davidas	Guadeloupe	17 March 1992 (aged 21)	M	
Jean Ismael Voltaire	Haiti	4 May 1994 (aged 19)	D	
Luckner Junior Horat	Haiti	27 September 1994 (aged 19)	D	
Kemar Lawrence	Jamaica	17 September 1992 (aged 21)	M/D	
Kendell Allen	Montserrat	2 June 1992 (aged 21)	D	
Joseph Marrero	Puerto Rico	4 September 1993 (aged 20)	M	
Samuel J. Soto Alvarez	Puerto Rico	11 August 1992 (aged 21)	F/M	
Jose Sandoval	Puerto Rico	1 January 1991 (aged 23)	M	
Jamal J. Francis	Saint Kitts and Nevis	23 March 1993 (aged 20)	GK	
Kimaree B.A. Rogers	Saint Kitts and Nevis	14 January 1994 (aged 19)	M/F	
Eden Charles	Saint Lucia	19 October 1993 (aged 20)	M	
Stefano Rijssel	Suriname	26 March 1992 (aged 21)	M/F	Selected for MLS Combine
Miguel Danny Darson	Suriname	27 May 1993 (aged 20)	D	

=== Known rejected players ===
Name	Nationality	Date of birth	Position	Reference
Matthew Suberan	Cayman Islands	3 February 1995 (aged 18)	M/F	
Jermaine Woozencroft	Jamaica	19 August 1992 (aged 21)	M/F	

=== Drafted players ===
Name	Nationality	Drafted by	Round Drafted	Pick Overall	Reference
Stefano Rijssel	Suriname	Seattle Sounders FC	3rd	55	

== 2015 ==
The 2015 Caribbean Combine was held between January 2 and 5, 2015, in Bayamón, Puerto Rico. The combine took place at the facilities of Bayamón FC, including Juan Ramón Loubriel Stadium, and featured matches with local clubs. For the combine, 19 players representing 17 associations from the region were invited. Following the Caribbean Combine, only Jean Carlos Lopez Moscoso of the Dominican Republic was invited to the MLS Combine. No players from the Caribbean combine were selected as Lopez was not taken in any of the four rounds of the draft.

=== Players ===
Name	Nationality	Date of birth	Position	Notes
Mavrick Annerose	Guadeloupe	29 November 1995 (aged 19)	MF	
Julani Archibald	Saint Kitts and Nevis	18 May 1991 (aged 23)	GK	
Ronaldo Bailey	Barbados	5 July 1996 (aged 18)	DF	
Troy Caesar	British Virgin Islands	13 May 1994 (aged 20)	DF	
Emmery Edward	Saint Lucia	10 October 1994 (aged 20)	FW	
Marco Fenelus	Turks and Caicos Islands	22 August 1992 (aged 22)	FW	
Kevin Francis	Saint Vincent and the Grenadines	11 January 1994 (aged 20)	DF	
Tevaughn Harriette	Antigua and Barbuda	26 June 1995 (aged 19)	FW	
Vershawn Hodge	Anguilla	8 February 1992 (aged 22)	MF	
Sydney Lockhart	Dominica	3 August 1996 (aged 18)	MF	
Jean Carlos Lopez Moscoso	Dominican Republic	11 September 1993 (aged 21)	MF	Selected for MLS Combine
Joseph Marrero	Puerto Rico	4 September 1993 (aged 21)	MF	
Anani Mohamed	Guyana	10 February 1992 (aged 22)	FW	
Clifford Newby-Harris	Montserrat	23 January 1995 (aged 19)	DF	
Kyrhon Phillip	Saint Kitts and Nevis	22 September 1994 (aged 20)	MF	
Jonte Smith	Bermuda	10 July 1994 (aged 20)	FW	
Denny Smith	U.S. Virgin Islands	5 December 1992 (aged 21)	GK	
Reid Strain	Puerto Rico	4 January 1994 (aged 20)	FW	
Jermaine Woozencroft	Jamaica	19 August 1992 (aged 22)	MF	

=== Known rejected players ===
Name	Nationality	Date of birth	Position	Reference
Cardel Benbow	Jamaica	3 June 1995 (aged 18)	M/F	

== 2016 ==
The 2016 edition of the MLS Caribbean Combine was held on three different islands at different times, unlike previous years in which it was held at a central location. Players were invited to specific host islands based on their country of origin. Twenty four players were invited to each location for a total of 72 players, a significant increase over previous years. The reason for decentralizing the combine was to make it easier for more nations to participate.

=== Hosting and known players ===
- Saint Kitts and Nevis hosted players from Anguilla, Antigua and Barbuda, British Virgin Islands, Cayman Islands, Jamaica, Montserrat, Puerto Rico, Turks and Caicos, and the United States Virgin Islands from 13 December to 16 December at the Warner Park Sporting Complex.

Name	Nationality	Date of birth	Position	Notes	Ref.
Carlos Bertie	Saint Kitts and Nevis				
Javiem Blanchette	Saint Kitts and Nevis	29 September 1991 (aged 24)	FW		
Raheem Francis	Saint Kitts and Nevis	28 May 1996 (aged 19)	MF		
Novelle Francis Jr.	Antigua and Barbuda				
Keithroy Freeman	Saint Kitts and Nevis	16 October 1993 (aged 22)	DF		
Jonathan Guishard	Anguilla	2 July 1996 (aged 19)	DF		
Tevaughn Harriette	Antigua and Barbuda	26 June 1995 (aged 20)	MF		
Germain Hughes	Anguilla	15 October 1996 (aged 19)	MF		
Jorginho James	Jamaica	7 July 1994 (aged 21)	MF	Selected for MLS Combine	
Eugene Kirwan	Antigua and Barbuda	1 January 1993 (aged 22)	MF		
Amal Knight	Jamaica		MF		
Malik Liburd	Saint Kitts and Nevis				
Chevone Marsh	Jamaica	25 February 1994 (aged 21)	GK		
Lorne Maxime Jr.	U.S. Virgin Islands	16 September 1992 (aged 23)	FW		
Ryan Miller	Jamaica		MF		
Clyde Mitchum	Saint Kitts and Nevis	16 June 1994 (aged 21)	DF		
Aljah Newton	Saint Kitts and Nevis				
Shavorn Phillip	Antigua and Barbuda	9 September 1996 (aged 19)	DF		
Alrique Rogers	Anguilla	23 January 1996 (aged 19)	FW		
Jamoy Stevens	Antigua and Barbuda	22 October 1993 (aged 22)	DF		
Elvis Thomas	Antigua and Barbuda	2 June 1994 (aged 21)	FW		
Shamoy Thompson	British Virgin Islands	27 May 1997 (aged 18)	MF		

- Curaçao hosted players from Aruba, Bahamas, Bermuda, Bonaire, Dominican Republic, Guyana, Haiti, Suriname, and Trinidad and Tobago from 17 December to 20 December. Ten total players from Aruba, Bonaire, the Dominican Republic, and Guyana attended in addition to ten Curaçao players who met the requirements.

Name	Nationality	Date of birth	Position	Notes	Ref.
Delon Lanferman	Guyana		FW		
Yurick Seinpaal	Bonaire	12 November 1995 (aged 20)	FW		
Jumane Somerset	Guyana		DF		
Alexander Vidal Ceballos	Dominican Republic	2 September 1996 (aged 19)	DF		

- Martinique hosted players from Barbados, Dominica, French Guiana, Grenada, Guadeloupe, St. Maarten, St. Martin, St. Vincent and the Grenadines, and St. Lucia from 1 January and 4 January.

Name	Nationality	Date of birth	Position	Notes	Ref.
Anfernee Frederick	Dominica	23 January 1996 (aged 19)	MF		
Briel Thomas	Dominica	25 October 1994 (aged 21)	MF		
Lejuan Simmons	Bermuda	7 April 1993 (aged 22)	FW		
Jomo Harris	Barbados	15 February 1995 (aged 20)	MF		
Romario Harewood	Barbados	17 August 1994 (aged 21)	MF		
Jordy Delem	Martinique	18 March 1993 (aged 22)	MF		
Johnny Marajo	Martinique	21 October 1993 (aged 22)	FW		
Franck-Olivier Rochambeau	Martinique	9 November 1993 (aged 22)	FW		
Jean-Manuel Nédra	Martinique		DF		
Ambroise Félicité	Martinique				

== 2017 ==
In October 2016 it was announced that the base of the 2017 MLS Caribbean Combine would be merged with the final round of CFU 2017 CONCACAF U-20 Championship qualification taking place that same month. The qualifiers would be attended directly by scouts from MLS teams, with representatives from at least the Philadelphia Union, Real Salt Lake, and Seattle Sounders FC confirmed to attend. The decision to combine the two events was logistical since many of the region's best young players and national teams from the desired age group would be participating. The new format meant that players from nations that were not part of the competition would not have the opportunity to be scouted at this edition of the combine.

== 2018 ==
The combine returned to a single-venue, invite-only format in 2018. This edition of the combine was the first held outside of the Caribbean with the three-day event taking place at the Sawgrass Hotel and Suites Sports Complex outside of Fort Lauderdale, Florida from January 9–11, 2018. Chosen invitees will then attend the MLS Player Combine from January 11–17 in Orlando. In total, 22 players were invited to attend the event. Ultimately, no players from the Caribbean Combine were invited to the MLS Combine.

=== Players ===
Name	Nationality	Date of birth	Position	Notes
Oniel Anderson	Jamaica	21 March 1997 (aged 20)	D	
Jeff Beljour	Turks and Caicos Islands	4 April 1998 (aged 19)	D/M	
Mazhye Burchall	Bermuda	28 January 1998 (aged 19)	F	
Thierry Catherine	Martinique	2 September 1997 (aged 20)	M	
Jonah Ebanks	Cayman Islands	7 May 1996 (aged 21)	M	
Kyle Edwards	Saint Vincent and the Grenadines	15 January 1997 (aged 20)	M	
Djai Essed	Sint Maarten	25 April 1998 (aged 19)	D	
Maalique Foster	Jamaica	5 November 1996 (aged 21)	F	
Jules Haabo	French Guiana	12 April 1997 (aged 20)	M	
Hadan Holligan	Barbados	16 October 1996 (aged 21)	M	
Germain Hughes	Anguilla	15 November 1996 (aged 21)	M/D	
Andrez Joseph	Dominica	20 May 1998 (aged 19)	D	
Tyrique Lake	Anguilla	4 January 1999 (aged 19)	M/D	
Alex Marshall	Jamaica	24 February 1998 (aged 19)	F/M	
Gylles Mitchel	Dominica	16 December 1997 (aged 20)	M/D	
G'Vaune Amory (Note: Amory replaced Yohannes Mitchum as SKN's representative after Mitchum experienced issues with his visa.)	Saint Kitts and Nevis	22 June 1997 (aged 20)	M	
Nickenson Paul	Aruba	24 August 1997 (aged 20)	M	
Na-jir Jacques Peney	Curaçao	17 July 1997 (aged 20)	M	
Jamarlie Stevens	Antigua and Barbuda	20 April 1997 (aged 20)	D	
Kathon St. Hillaire	Trinidad and Tobago	5 November 1997 (aged 20)	M/F	
Gilbert Tilus	Turks and Caicos Islands	28 October 1998 (aged 19)	D	
Josiah Trimmingham	Trinidad and Tobago	14 December 1996 (aged 21)	M	

== 2019 ==
The 2019 MLS Caribbean Combine was held in Kingston, Jamaica from 15-18 October and in Bridgetown, Barbados from Oct. 22-25, 2018. Fifteen nations sent representatives to the combines. Addition details were released regarding compensation for players and former club, if applicable, if signed by an MLS club as a result of the combine. These details included the player’s club will receiving an Adidas allotment and a transfer fee of US $50,000 if the player’s MLS option for 2020 is exercised. Additional compensation was available to former club depending on the player's performance including US$25,000 after 15 official MLS appearances, $50,000 after 30 official MLS appearances, and $100,000 after 60 official MLS appearances. Finally, a player’s former club would receive 20% of any transfer fees received by the MLS within the first four years of the player’s employment in the league. Jamaican midfielder Peter-Lee Vassell was named MVP of the combine and was invited to the 2019 MLS Combine Vassell was then selected by Los Angeles FC with the 19th overall pick in the draft. He was later signed by the club for the 2019 Major League Soccer season, becoming the first player to ever be signed by a Major League Soccer side after featuring in the Caribbean Combine.

=== Known players ===
Name	Nationality	Date of birth	Position	Notes
Ackeel Applewhaite	Barbados	17 July 1999 (aged 19)	MF	
Chavel Cunningham	Saint Vincent and the Grenadines	20 July 1995 (aged 23)	FW	
Kevin Dundas	Guyana	16 March 1996 (aged 22)	DF	
Vino Barclett	Saint Lucia	12 October 1999 (aged 19)	GK	
Javid George	Dominica	14 June 1998 (aged 20)	FW	
Ryan Hackette	Guyana	11 September 1999 (aged 19)	MF	
Raejae Joseph	U.S. Virgin Islands	9 August 1997 (aged 21)	MF	
Kevin Layne	Guyana	1 January 1998 (aged 20)	DF	
Omani Leacock	Barbados	1 May 1998 (aged 20)	MF	
Kiano Martin	Dominica	9 August 2000 (aged 18)	DF	
Kishmar Primus	Barbados	9 April 1998 (aged 20)	GK	
Joel Quashie	Saint Vincent and the Grenadines	16 June 2001 (aged 17)	MF	
Peter-Lee Vassell	Jamaica	3 February 1998 (aged 20)	MF	Invited to 2019 MLS Combine, drafted and signed

== 2020 ==
The 2020 MLS Caribbean Combine took place in Kingston, Jamaica from December 2 to December 4, 2019.

=== Known players ===
Name	Nationality	Date of birth	Position	Notes
Stefforn Abraham	Grenada	29 December 1999 (aged 19)	MF	
Akeem Chambers	Jamaica	16 June 1998 (aged 21)	GK	
Andre Fletcher	Jamaica	31 January 1999 (aged 20)	MF	
Jeremy Loogman	Bonaire	14 August 2000 (aged 19)	GK	
Yohannes Mitchum	Saint Kitts and Nevis	6 April 1998 (aged 21)	MF	
Tafari Smith	Anguilla	26 March 2000 (aged 19)	DF	
Petrez Williams	Saint Kitts and Nevis	18 June 2000 (aged 19)	DF	

== See also ==
- MLS Combine
- MLS SuperDraft
