= 2026 FIFA World Cup qualification – CONCACAF first round =

Tournament details
- Dates: 22–26 March 2024
- Teams: 4 (from 1 confederation)

Tournament statistics
- Matches played: 4
- Goals scored: 4 (1 per match)
- Attendance: 1,780 (445 per match)
- Top scorer(s): (Anguilla) Luke Paris (British Virgin Islands) Hugo Liziario (Turks and Caicos Islands) Billy Forbes (United States Virgin Islands) Jett Blaschka (1 goal each)

The first round of CONCACAF matches for 2026 FIFA World Cup qualification were played on 22 and 26 March 2024. Anguilla and the British Virgin Islands advanced to the second round.

== Format ==
Four teams, ranked as the bottom four in the CONCACAF entrant list, played home-and-away over two legs in two ties. The two winners advanced to the second round.

== Seeding ==
The seeding was based on the FIFA Men's World Ranking of December 2023 (shown in parentheses).

Note: Bolded teams qualified for the second round.

Seeded	Unseeded
1. Turks and Caicos Islands (206); 2. **British Virgin Islands** (207)	3. U.S. Virgin Islands (208); 4. **Anguilla** (209)

The first round ties were predetermined as follows:

- First-ranked team vs fourth-ranked team
- Second-ranked team vs third-ranked team

The lower-ranked teams hosted the first leg, while the higher-ranked teams hosted the second leg.

== Summary ==
The first legs were played on 22 March, while the second legs were played on 26 March 2024.

Team 1	Agg.	Team 2	1st leg	2nd leg
Anguilla	1–1 (4–3 p)	Turks and Caicos Islands	0–0	1–1 (a.e.t.)
U.S. Virgin Islands	1–1 (2–4 p)	British Virgin Islands	1–1	0–0 (a.e.t.)

== Matches ==
22 March 2024
15:00 UTC−4

Anguilla	0–0	Turks and Caicos Islands
	Report (FIFA); Report (CONCACAF)

Raymond E. Guishard Technical Centre, The Valley
Attendance: 618
Referee: Natalie Simon (United States)
26 March 2024
19:00 UTC−4

Turks and Caicos Islands	1–1 (a.e.t.)	Anguilla
Forbes 23'	Report (FIFA); Report (CONCACAF)	Paris 45+3' (pen.)
Penalties
Cadet (penalty scored); Louisy (penalty missed); Paul (penalty scored); Howell (penalty missed); Forbes (penalty scored); Martin (penalty missed)	3–4	(penalty missed) Lawrence; (penalty scored) Paris; (penalty scored) Deans; (penalty scored) Connor; (penalty missed) Carpenter; (penalty scored) Duncan

TCIFA National Academy, Providenciales
Attendance: 337
Referee: Reginald Gumbs (Saint Kitts and Nevis)

1–1 on aggregate. Anguilla won 4–3 on penalties and advanced to the second round (Group F).

22 March 2024
17:00 UTC−4

U.S. Virgin Islands	1–1	British Virgin Islands
Blaschka 73'	Report (FIFA); Report (CONCACAF)	Liziario 90+2'

Bethlehem Soccer Stadium, Upper Bethlehem
Attendance: 295
Referee: Katia García (Mexico)
26 March 2024
15:00 UTC−4

British Virgin Islands	0–0 (a.e.t.)	U.S. Virgin Islands
	Report (FIFA); Report (CONCACAF)
Penalties
Bertie (penalty scored); Wiltshire (penalty scored); Gallimore (penalty missed); Forbes (penalty scored); Callwood (penalty scored)	4–2	(penalty scored) Kendall; (penalty missed) Whyte; (penalty missed) Blaschka; (penalty scored) J. Ramos

A. O. Shirley Recreation Ground, Road Town
Attendance: 530
Referee: Ken Pennyfeather (Antigua and Barbuda)

1–1 on aggregate. British Virgin Islands won 4–2 on penalties and advanced to the second round (Group E).

== Goalscorers ==
There were 4 goals scored in 4 matches, for an average of 1 goal per match.

1 goal

- (Anguilla national football team) Luke Paris
- (British Virgin Islands national football team) Hugo Liziario
- (Turks and Caicos Islands national football team) Billy Forbes
- (United States Virgin Islands national soccer team) Jett Blaschka

== Discipline ==
A player was automatically suspended for the next match for the following infractions:

- Receiving a red card (red card suspensions may be extended for serious infractions)
- Receiving two yellow cards in two different matches (yellow card suspensions are carried forward to further qualification rounds, but not the finals or any other future international matches)

There were no suspensions served during the first round.
