= Tesselaar =

Tesselaar is a surname. Notable people with this surname include:

- Brian-Paul Tesselaar (born 1989), Anguillian-Dutch footballer
- Jan-Willem Tesselaar (born 1997), Anguillian-Dutch footballer
- Jeff Tesselaar (born 2003), Dutch multi-event athlete
- Jeroen Tesselaar (born 1989), Dutch footballer

== See also ==
- Tesselaar Tulip Festival, a flower festival in Victoria, Australia
- Tesselaarsdal, settlement in Western Cape, South Africa
