= Anguilla national football team results =

This page details the match results and statistics of the Anguilla national football team.

== Key ==
Key to matches

- Att.=Match attendance
- (H)=Home ground
- (A)=Away ground
- (N)=Neutral ground

Key to record by opponent

- Pld=Games played
- W=Games won
- D=Games drawn
- L=Games lost
- GF=Goals for
- GA=Goals against

== Results ==
Anguilla's score is shown first in each case.

No.	Date	Venue	Opponents	Score	Competition	Anguilla scorers	Att.	Ref.
1	October 1985	(H)	British Virgin Islands	0–1	1985 Leeward Islands Tournament		—	
2	26 March 1990	(H)	Saint Martin	0–4	1990 Caribbean Cup qualification		—	
3	28 March 1990	(N)	British Virgin Islands	0–6	1990 Caribbean Cup qualification		—	
4	14 May 1991	Vieux Fort National Stadium, Vieux Fort (N)	Montserrat	1–1	1991 Caribbean Cup qualification	Lake	—	
5	16 May 1991	Vieux Fort National Stadium, Vieux Fort (N)	Saint Lucia	0–6	1990 Caribbean Cup qualification		1,500	
6	2 May 1992	(H)	Cuba	0–3	1992 Caribbean Cup qualification		—	
7	9 May 1992	(A)	Cuba	0–5	1992 Caribbean Cup qualification		—	
8	4 April 1993	(H)	Antigua and Barbuda	0–4	1993 Caribbean Cup qualification		—	
9	6 April 1993	(H)	Sint Maarten	0–1	1993 Caribbean Cup qualification		—	
10	4 March 1994	Arnos Vale Stadium, Kingstown (N)	Guadeloupe	0–9	1994 Caribbean Cup qualification		—	
11	6 March 1994	Arnos Vale Stadium, Kingstown (N)	Saint Vincent and the Grenadines	0–2	1994 Caribbean Cup qualification		—	
12	26 March 1995	Sturge Park, Plymouth (A)	Montserrat	2–3	1995 Caribbean Cup qualification	Proctor, Carter	—	
13	2 April 1995	Ronald Webster Park, The Valley (H)	Montserrat	0–1	1995 Caribbean Cup qualification		—	
14	27 March 1996	Warner Park, Basseterre (N)	Saint Kitts and Nevis	0–8	1996 Caribbean Cup qualification		—	
15	29 March 1996	Warner Park, Basseterre (N)	Sint Maarten	0–4	1996 Caribbean Cup qualification		—	
16	2 April 1997	(N)	Sint Maarten	0–3	1997 Caribbean Cup qualification		—	
17	4 April 1997	(N)	British Virgin Islands	1–4	1997 Caribbean Cup qualification	Unknown	—	
18	6 April 1997	(N)	Dominica	0–5	1997 Caribbean Cup qualification		—	
19	15 April 1998	Antigua Recreation Ground, St. John's (N)	Grenada	1–14	1998 Caribbean Cup qualification	Heyliger	—	
20	17 April 1998	Antigua Recreation Ground, St. John's (N)	Antigua and Barbuda	0–7	1998 Caribbean Cup qualification		—	
21	19 April 1998	Antigua Recreation Ground, St. John's (N)	Guyana	0–14	1998 Caribbean Cup qualification		—	
22	25 February 2000	A. O. Shirley Recreation Ground, Road Town (A)	British Virgin Islands	4–3	Friendly	O'Connor (2), T. Rogers, Connor	—	
23	27 February 2000	A. O. Shirley Recreation Ground, Road Town (A)	British Virgin Islands	0–5	Friendly		—	
24	5 March 2000	Ronald Webster Park, The Valley (H)	Bahamas	1–3	2002 FIFA World Cup qualification	Hughes	250	
25	19 March 2000	Thomas Robinson Stadium, Nassau (A)	Bahamas	1–2	2002 FIFA World Cup qualification	O'Connor	330	
26	8 February 2001	Stade Alberic Richards, Marigot (N)	Montserrat	4–1	2001 Caribbean Cup qualification	T. Rogers, Connor (2), Edwards	—	
27	10 February 2001	Stade Alberic Richards, Marigot (N)	Saint Martin	1–3	2001 Caribbean Cup qualification	T. Rogers	—	
28	6 June 2002	Stade Alberic Richards, Marigot (A)	Saint Martin	1–2	Friendly	Unknown	—	
29	23 June 2002	Stade Alberic Richards, Marigot (A)	Saint Martin	0–1	Friendly		—	
30	6 July 2002	A. O. Shirley Recreation Ground, Road Town (A)	British Virgin Islands	1–2	Friendly	Unknown	—	
31	19 March 2004	Félix Sánchez Olympic Stadium, Santo Domingo (A)	Dominican Republic	0–0	2006 FIFA World Cup qualification		400	
32	21 March 2004	Félix Sánchez Olympic Stadium, Santo Domingo (H)	Dominican Republic	0–6	2006 FIFA World Cup qualification		850	
33	20 September 2006	Antigua Recreation Ground, St. John's (N)	Antigua and Barbuda	3–5	2007 Caribbean Cup qualification	St. Hillaire, Asset, O'Connor	—	
34	22 September 2006	Antigua Recreation Ground, St. John's (N)	Saint Kitts and Nevis	1–6	2007 Caribbean Cup qualification	O'Connor	—	
35	24 September 2006	Antigua Recreation Ground, St. John's (N)	Barbados	1–7	2007 Caribbean Cup qualification	Connor	—	
36	6 February 2008	Estadio Cuscatlán, San Salvador (A)	El Salvador	0–12	2010 FIFA World Cup qualification		15,000	
37	26 March 2008	Robert F. Kennedy Memorial Stadium, Washington, D.C. (H)	El Salvador	0–4	2010 FIFA World Cup qualification		22,670	
38	17 September 2008	Stade Louis Achille, Fort-de-France (N)	Saint Vincent and the Grenadines	1–3	2008 Caribbean Cup qualification	Battice	100	
39	19 September 2008	Stade Louis Achille, Fort-de-France (N)	Martinique	1–3	2008 Caribbean Cup qualification	Jeffers (o.g.)	—	
40	8 August 2010	Ronald Webster Park, The Valley (H)	Saint Martin	1–3	Friendly	Unknown	—	
41	18 September 2010	Stade Thelbert Carti, Quartier-d'Orleans (N)	British Virgin Islands	1–2	Friendly	Isaac (o.g.)	—	
42	2 October 2010	Juan Ramón Loubriel Stadium, Bayamón (N)	Puerto Rico	1–3	2010 Caribbean Cup qualification	Richardson	2,050	
43	4 October 2010	Juan Ramón Loubriel Stadium, Bayamón (N)	Cayman Islands	1–4	2010 Caribbean Cup qualification	Brooks	500	
44	6 October 2010	Juan Ramón Loubriel Stadium, Bayamón (N)	Saint Martin	2–1	2010 Caribbean Cup qualification	Brooks, T. Rogers	500	
45	19 June 2011	Ronald Webster Park, The Valley (H)	U.S. Virgin Islands	0–0	Friendly		550	
46	8 July 2011	Estadio Panamericano, San Cristóbal (H)	Dominican Republic	0–2	2014 FIFA World Cup qualification		1,000	
47	10 July 2011	Estadio Panamericano, San Cristóbal (A)	Dominican Republic	0–4	2014 FIFA World Cup qualification		1,500	
48	7 July 2012	A. O. Shirley Recreation Ground, Road Town (A)	British Virgin Islands	0–1	Friendly		—	
49	10 October 2012	Warner Park, Basseterre (N)	Saint Kitts and Nevis	0–2	2012 Caribbean Cup qualification		700	
50	12 October 2012	Warner Park, Basseterre (N)	French Guiana	1–4	2012 Caribbean Cup qualification	T. Rogers	600	
51	14 October 2012	Warner Park, Basseterre (N)	Trinidad and Tobago	0–10	2012 Caribbean Cup qualification		40	
52	3 September 2014	Antigua Recreation Ground, St. John's (N)	Antigua and Barbuda	0–6	2014 Caribbean Cup qualification		—	
53	5 September 2014	Antigua Recreation Ground, St. John's (N)	Saint Vincent and the Grenadines	0–4	2014 Caribbean Cup qualification		—	
54	7 September 2014	Antigua Recreation Ground, St. John's (N)	Dominican Republic	0–10	2014 Caribbean Cup qualification		—	
55	28 February 2015	Ronald Webster Park, The Valley (H)	British Virgin Islands	1–0	Friendly	Battice	—	
56	1 March 2015	Ronald Webster Park, The Valley (H)	British Virgin Islands	3–1	Friendly	Battice, Richardson, Connor	—	
57	23 March 2015	Nicaragua National Football Stadium, Managua (A)	Nicaragua	0–5	2018 FIFA World Cup qualification		4,214	
58	29 March 2015	Ronald Webster Park, The Valley (H)	Nicaragua	0–3	2018 FIFA World Cup qualification		1,200	
59	13 March 2016	Raoul Illidge Sports Complex, Philipsburg (A)	Sint Maarten	0–2	Friendly		—	
60	22 March 2016	Providence Stadium, Providence (A)	Guyana	0–7	2017 Caribbean Cup qualification		—	
61	26 March 2016	Raymond E. Guishard Technical Centre, The Valley (H)	Puerto Rico	0–4	2017 Caribbean Cup qualification		—	
62	22 August 2018	Raoul Illidge Sports Complex, Philipsburg (A)	Sint Maarten	1–1	Friendly	G. Rogers	—	
63	26 August 2018	Raymond E. Guishard Technical Centre, The Valley (H)	Saint Martin	1–2	Friendly	Battice	—	
64	7 September 2018	Raymond E. Guishard Technical Centre, The Valley (H)	French Guiana	0–5	2019–20 CONCACAF Nations League qualifying		—	
65	14 October 2018	Estadio Eladio Rosabal Cordero, Heredia (A)	Nicaragua	0–6	2019–20 CONCACAF Nations League qualifying		—	
66	18 November 2018	Thomas Robinson Stadium, Nassau (A)	Bahamas	1–1	2019–20 CONCACAF Nations League qualifying	Rogers	—	
67	10 March 2019	Raymond E. Guishard Technical Centre, The Valley (H)	Saint Martin	2–1	Friendly	Smith, Lee	—	
68	22 March 2019	Raymond E. Guishard Technical Centre, The Valley (H)	U.S. Virgin Islands	0–3	2019–20 CONCACAF Nations League qualifying		—	
69	5 September 2019	Estadio Doroteo Guamuch Flores, Guatemala City (A)	Guatemala	0–10	2019–20 CONCACAF Nations League		—	
70	12 October 2019	Raymond E. Guishard Technical Centre, The Valley (H)	Guatemala	0–5	2019–20 CONCACAF Nations League		—	
71	15 October 2019	Raymond E. Guishard Technical Centre, The Valley (H)	Puerto Rico	2–3	2019–20 CONCACAF Nations League	Lake-Bryan, Guishard	—	
72	10 November 2019	Ato Boldon Stadium, Couva (A)	Trinidad and Tobago	0–15	Friendly		—	
73	19 November 2019	Juan Ramón Loubriel Stadium, Bayamón (A)	Puerto Rico	0–3	2019–20 CONCACAF Nations League		—	
74	21 March 2021	DRV PNK Stadium, Fort Lauderdale (N)	U.S. Virgin Islands	0–0	Friendly		—	
75	27 March 2021	DRV PNK Stadium, Fort Lauderdale (H)	Dominican Republic	0–6	2022 FIFA World Cup qualification		—	
76	30 March 2021	Félix Sánchez Olympic Stadium, Santo Domingo (A)	Barbados	0–1	2022 FIFA World Cup qualification		0	
77	2 June 2021	Félix Sánchez Olympic Stadium, Santo Domingo (A)	Dominica	0–3	2022 FIFA World Cup qualification		0	
78	5 June 2021	Estadio Nacional de Panamá, Panama City (H)	Panama	0–13	2022 FIFA World Cup qualification		5,000	
79	28 January 2022	Bisham Abbey National Sports Centre, Bisham (N)	British Virgin Islands	2–1	Friendly	Smith, Carty	—	
80	14 February 2022	Stade Thelbert Carti, Quartier-d'Orleans (A)	Saint Martin	2–1	Friendly	Gayle, Austin	—	
81	2 June 2022	Raymond E. Guishard Stadium, The Valley (H)	Dominica	0–0	2022–23 CONCACAF Nations League		—	
82	5 June 2022	Warner Park, Basseterre (A)	Dominica	1–1	2022–23 CONCACAF Nations League	Guishard	—	
83	12 June 2022	Daren Sammy Cricket Ground, Gros Islet (A)	Saint Lucia	0–2	2022–23 CONCACAF Nations League		—	
84	4 March 2023	Raymond E. Guishard Stadium, The Valley (H)	Saint Martin	2–2	Friendly	Hughes, Deans	—	
85	24 March 2023	Raymond E. Guishard Stadium, The Valley (H)	Saint Lucia	1–2	2022–23 CONCACAF Nations League	Carpenter	—	
86	7 September 2023	Raymond E. Guishard Stadium, The Valley (H)	Saint Martin	0–6	2023–24 CONCACAF Nations League		—	
87	12 October 2023	Stadion Antonio Trenidat, Rincon (A)	Bonaire	0–2	2023–24 CONCACAF Nations League		660	
88	16 October 2023	SKNFA Technical Center, Basseterre (A)	Saint Martin	0–8	2023–24 CONCACAF Nations League		—	
89	18 November 2023	Raymond E. Guishard Stadium, The Valley (H)	Bonaire	0–3	2023–24 CONCACAF Nations League		267	
90	17 March 2024	Raoul Illidge Sports Complex, Philipsburg (A)	Sint Maarten	1–1	Friendly			
91	22 March 2024	Raymond E. Guishard Stadium, The Valley (H)	Turks and Caicos Islands	0–0	2026 FIFA World Cup qualification			
92	26 March 2024	TCIFA National Academy, Providenciales	Turks and Caicos Islands	1–1 (3-4)	2026 FIFA World Cup qualification	Luke Paris		
93	26 May 2024		Saint Martin	1–2	Friendly			
94	8 June 2024	Raymond E. Guishard Stadium, The Valley (H)	Suriname	0–4	2026 FIFA World Cup qualification			
95	11 June 2024	Juan Ramón Loubriel Stadium, Bayamón	Puerto Rico	0–8	2026 FIFA World Cup qualification			
96	4 September 2024	TCIFA National Academy, Providenciales	Turks and Caicos Islands	2–0	2024–25 CONCACAF Nations League	Hughes, Carpenter		
97	10 September 2024	TCIFA National Academy, Providenciales	Belize	0–1	2024–25 CONCACAF Nations League			
98	9 October 2024	FFB Stadium, Belmopan	Belize	0–1	2024–25 CONCACAF Nations League			
99	12 October 2024	FFB Stadium, Belmopan	Turks and Caicos Islands	1–2	2024–25 CONCACAF Nations League	Carpenter		

Notes

1. A: Anguilla played their home match during qualifying for the 2006 FIFA World Cup in Santo Domingo, Dominican Republic.
2. B: Due to the lack of a suitable venue, Anguilla played their home match during qualifying for the 2010 FIFA World Cup in Washington, District of Columbia, United States.
3. C: Due to the lack of a suitable venue, Anguilla played their home match during qualifying for the 2014 FIFA World Cup in San Cristóbal, Dominican Republic.
4. D: Due to security concerns caused by the 2018–2021 Nicaraguan protests, Nicaragua played their home match against Anguilla during qualifying for the 2019–20 CONCACAF Nations League in Heredia, Costa Rica.
5. E: Due to the COVID-19 pandemic in North America, Anguilla played their home match against the Dominican Republic during qualifying for the 2022 FIFA World Cup in Fort Lauderdale, Florida, United States.
6. F: Due to the COVID-19 pandemic in North America, Barbados played their home match against Anguilla during qualifying for the 2022 FIFA World Cup in Santo Domingo, Dominican Republic.
7. G: Match played behind closed doors due to the COVID-19 pandemic in North America.
8. H: Due to the COVID-19 pandemic in North America, Dominica played their home match against Anguilla during qualifying for the 2022 FIFA World Cup in Santo Domingo, Dominican Republic.
9. I: Due to the COVID-19 pandemic in North America, Anguilla played their home match against Panama during qualifying for the 2022 FIFA World Cup in Panama City, Panama.
10. J: Dominica played their home match against Anguilla during the 2022–23 CONCACAF Nations League in Basseterre, Saint Kitts and Nevis.
11. K: Saint Martin played their home match against Anguilla during the 2023–24 CONCACAF Nations League in Basseterre, Saint Kitts and Nevis.

== Record by opponent ==
As of 1 October 2026 after match against the Antigua and Barbuda

Team	Pld	W	D	L	GF	GA	GD	WPCT
Aruba	1	0	0	1	0	2	−2	0.00
Antigua and Barbuda	5	0	0	5	3	25	−22	0.00
Bahamas	5	2	1	2	6	7	−1	40.00
Barbados	2	0	0	2	1	8	−7	0.00
Belize	2	0	0	2	0	2	−2	0.00
Bonaire	2	0	0	2	0	5	−5	0.00
British Virgin Islands	14	5	2	7	15	27	−12	35.71
Cayman Islands	2	0	0	2	1	8	−7	0.00
Cuba	2	0	0	2	0	8	−8	0.00
Dominica	5	0	2	3	1	10	−9	0.00
Dominican Republic	6	0	1	5	0	28	−28	0.00
El Salvador	3	0	0	3	0	19	−19	0.00
French Guiana	2	0	0	2	1	9	−8	0.00
Gibraltar	1	0	0	1	1	4	−3	0.00
Grenada	2	0	0	2	1	16	−15	0.00
Guadeloupe	1	0	0	1	0	9	−9	0.00
Guatemala	2	0	0	2	0	15	−15	0.00
Guyana	2	0	0	2	0	21	−21	0.00
Martinique	1	0	0	1	1	3	−2	0.00
Montserrat	4	1	1	2	7	6	+1	25.00
Nicaragua	3	0	0	3	0	14	−14	0.00
Panama	1	0	0	1	0	13	−13	0.00
Puerto Rico	5	0	0	5	3	21	−18	0.00
Saint Kitts and Nevis	4	0	0	4	3	20	−17	0.00
Saint Lucia	3	0	0	3	1	10	−9	0.00
Saint Martin	13	3	1	9	13	36	−23	23.08
Sint Maarten	7	0	2	5	3	13	−10	0.00
Saint Vincent and the Grenadines	4	0	0	4	1	15	−14	0.00
Suriname	1	0	0	1	0	4	−4	0.00
Turks and Caicos Islands	4	1	2	1	4	3	+1	25.00
Trinidad and Tobago	2	0	0	2	0	25	−25	0.00
U.S. Virgin Islands	3	0	2	1	0	3	−3	0.00
Total	114	12	14	88	66	409	−343	10.53

Source: Results
