= Jahiem Thompson =

Anguillan footballer (born 2007)

- Thompson with Oldham Athletic in 2024

Personal information
- Full name: Jahiem Warren Thompson
- Date of birth: 6 October 2007 (age 19)
- Place of birth: Blowing Point, Anguilla
- Height: 1.72 m (5 ft 8 in)
- Position: Midfielder

Team information
- Current team: Chesterfield

Youth career
- 2023–2024: Ecclesall Rangers
- 2024: Chesterfield
- 2024–2025: Oldham Athletic
- 2025–: Chesterfield

Senior career*
Years	Team	Apps	(Gls)
2025–	Chesterfield	0	(0)

International career^{‡}
2023–	Anguilla	5	(0)
- * Club domestic league appearances and goals ‡ National team caps and goals as of 11:43, 9 June 2026 (UTC)

Jahiem Thompson (born 6 October 2007) is an Anguillan professional footballer who plays as a midfielder for EFL League Two club Chesterfield and the Anguilla national team.

== Club career ==
Thompson joined the under-16 side of local club Eccleshall Rangers in 2023. In 2024, the club advanced to the final of the Sheffield & Hallamshire County FA U16 Youth Cup against Frickley Athletic. He joined the youth ranks of EFL League Two club Chesterfield the following year. After a spell with Oldham Athletic, he returned to Chesterfield in 2025.

== International career ==
Thompson was born and raised on the Caribbean island of Anguilla. He represented the territory at the youth level in 2022 CONCACAF U-17 Championship qualifying and 2026 CONCACAF U-20 Championship qualifying. He made his senior international debut on 18 November 2023 in a 2023–24 CONCACAF Nations League C match against Bonaire.

=== International career statistics ===
As of match played 26 March 2026.

Anguilla national team
Year	Apps	Goals
2023	1	0
2024	1	0
2025	2	0
2026	1	0
Total	5	0
