= Essed =

Essed may refer to:

== Surname ==
- Djai Essed (born 1998), St Maartener footballer
- Frank Essed (1919-1988), Surinamese forest scientist and politician
- Philomena Essed (born 1955), Surinamese-Dutch Professor

== Place ==
- Dr. Ir. Franklin Essed Stadion, stadium in Suriname
