= Girdon Connor =

Anguillan footballer (born 1979)

Personal information
- Date of birth: 26 January 1979 (age 47)
- Place of birth: Anguilla

Senior career*
Years	Team	Apps	(Gls)
2004–2019	Roaring Lions FC		

International career
2000–2018	Anguilla	29	(5)
- * Club domestic league appearances and goals

Girdon Connor (born 26 January 1979) is an Anguillan sports official and former footballer who is the president of the Anguilla Football Association.

== Education ==
Connor attended Lindenwood University in the United States, where he obtained a master's degree in accounting and management information systems.

== Playing career ==
Connor has been described as a "great player and very important for the National Team" and is the all-time top scorer in Anguilla national football team history with five goals. At one point, Connor was the all-time most-capped player in Anguilla national football team history. He played for the Anguilla national football team in the first edition of the CONCACAF Nations League. He retired from playing football shortly after.

== Style of play ==
Connor mainly operated as a midfielder.

== Post-playing career ==
After retiring from playing football, Connor became president of the Anguilla Football Association. He has been described as "most known for his contribution to football in Anguilla... Mr. Connor has also committed his time to the improvement of ‘De Youngsters FC’; a women's football club on island, Lions youth academy and national teams". He received criticism for his treatment of Anguillan manager Ahkeela Mollon.

== Personal life ==
Connor is the cousin of Anguilla international Nigel Connor.
