= Clifton Livingston =

English football manager

Personal information
- Place of birth: England

Managerial career
- Years: Team
- 2000: Anguilla

Clifton Livingston is an English professional football manager.

== Career ==
In 2000, he coached the Anguilla national football team.
