= Aedan Scipio =

Anguillan footballer

Personal information
- Date of birth: 3 September 1990 (age 36)
- Place of birth: Anguilla
- Height: 1.77 m (5 ft 10 in)
- Position: Midfielder

Team information
- Current team: Roaring Lions
- Number: 10

Youth career
- Teacher Gloria Omololu School

Senior career*
Years	Team	Apps	(Gls)
2020–	Roaring Lions	15	(13)

International career^{‡}
2006	Anguilla U17	3	(0)
2021–	Anguilla	18	(1)
- * Club domestic league appearances and goals ‡ National team caps and goals as of 29 March 2026

Aedan Scipio (born 3 September 1990) is an Anguillan professional footballer who plays as a midfielder for AFA Senior Male League club Roaring Lions and the Anguilla national team.

== Early life ==
Scipio showed promise as a young player by winning a skills competition for primary schoolers which was sponsored by the National Bank of Anguilla.

== Club career ==
As of 2020, Scipio plays for Roaring Lions of the AFA Senior Male League. He was named Man of the Match for his performance against Doc's United in August. The team went on to win the championship that season.

== International career ==
Scipio represented Anguilla at the youth level during 2007 CONCACAF U17 Tournament qualification. He made his senior international debut on 21 March 2021 in a friendly against the United States Virgin Islands. He made his competitive debut six days later in a 2022 FIFA World Cup qualification loss to the Dominican Republic.

In Anguilla's first match of the 2026-27 CONCACAF Nations League, against Antigua and Barbuda on 27 September 2026, two opponents received red cards in separate incidents for pulling Scipio back by his dreadlocks. This was the first occasion in which two different players were dismissed for pulling on a single opponent’s hair.

== Personal life ==
Scipio resides in London and has a BA from the University of Hull.

Scipio has also caught the attention of fans on social media for his distinctive ankle length dreadlocks.

== Career statistics ==
As of matches played to 27 September 2026

National team	Year	Apps	Goals
Anguilla	2021	2	0
Anguilla	2022	0	0
Anguilla	2023	2	0
Anguilla	2024	4	0
Anguilla	2025	5	0
Anguilla	2026	1	0
Total		13	0
