= Quintón Christina =

Curaçaoan footballer

Personal information
- Full name: Quintón Christopher Edson Christina
- Date of birth: 3 May 1995 (age 31)
- Place of birth: Willemstad, Curaçao
- Height: 1.71 m (5 ft 7 in)
- Position: Midfielder

Team information
- Current team: CVV Willemstad

Senior career*
Years	Team	Apps	(Gls)
2011–2016	Jong Holland		
2016–2018	Dordrecht II		
2018–2019	Inter Bratislava	23	(0)
2019	→ Petržalka (loan)	10	(0)
2020–2021	Partizán Bardejov	1	(0)
2021	Assyriska FF	12	(1)
2021–2023	Katwijk	37	(1)
2023	Noordwijk	22	(0)
2024–	CVV Willemstad		

International career^{‡}
2012	Curaçao	1	(0)
2023–	Sint Maarten	17	(1)
- * Club domestic league appearances and goals as of 22 November 2024 ‡ National team caps and goals as of 21 June 2026

Quintón Christopher Edson Christina (born 3 May 1995) is a footballer who plays as a midfielder for CVV Willemstad. Born in Curaçao, he represented for the Sint Maarten national team.

== Club career ==
Christina has played for Jong Holland of the Curaçao League, the top football league in Curaçao, since 2011. In 2012, Christina was given a 10-day trial with Zwolle of the Eredivisie, the highest level of football in the Netherlands.

In December 2013, it was announced that Christina was one of 23 top young Caribbean prospects to be invited to the inaugural MLS Caribbean Combine, a joint venture between Major League Soccer and the Caribbean Football Union with the objective of providing the young players with an opportunity to play in front of MLS scouts. Following the 3-day event, Christina was one of only two players selected to participate in the MLS Combine from 10 to 14 of January in Fort Lauderdale, Florida, along with Stefano Rijssel of Suriname.

== International career ==
Christina represented Curaçao at various youth levels including Under-17 and Under-20, including as part of the Under-20 squad that competed in the 2013 CONCACAF U-20 Championship in Mexico with hopes of qualifying for the 2013 FIFA U-20 World Cup in Turkey. In November 2013, it was announced that Christina was named to the roster for the senior squad as they prepared for the 2012 ABCS Tournament, an annual tournament between the Dutch-speaking countries of the Caribbean. He made his senior debut on 13 July 2012 in a match against Aruba in the tournament. Christina was named to the squad again for the 2013 edition of the tournament.

== Career statistics ==
=== International ===
Scores and results list Sint Maarten's goal tally first, score column indicates score after each Christina goal.

List of international goals scored by Quintón Christina
No.	Date	Venue	Opponent	Score	Result	Competition
1	14 October 2024	Trinidad Stadium, Oranjestad, Aruba	Puerto Rico	1–1	1–2	2024–25 CONCACAF Nations League B
