= Djai Essed =

St. Maartener footballer

Personal information
- Date of birth: 25 April 1998 (age 28)
- Place of birth: Amsterdam, Netherlands
- Height: 6 ft 2 in (1.88 m)
- Positions: Centre-back; forward

Team information
- Current team: Real Sranang

Youth career
- MPC Stars FC
- RISC Takers FC

College career
Years	Team	Apps	(Gls)
2016	Feather River Golden Eagles	14	(3)
2017	Northeastern Plainsmen	0	(0)

Senior career*
Years	Team	Apps	(Gls)
2015–2023	Flames United		
2023–	Real Sranang		

International career^{‡}
2016–	Sint Maarten	9	(1)
- * Club domestic league appearances and goals as of 22:02, 25 May 2016 (UTC) ‡ National team caps and goals as of 00:50, 28 March 2019 (UTC)

Djai Essed (born 25 April 1998) is a St. Maartener footballer who plays for the Sint Maarten national team.

== Youth career ==
In 2009, Essed played in the School Division of the St. Maarten Soccer Educational Foundation (SMSEF) for Sister Magda '98. That year, the team defeated the Caribbean International Academy to win the top division championship. That season, Essed was the top division's top scorer with 11 goals. Essed played for MPC Stars FC of the SMSEF youth league while attending Milton Peters College. In 2011, he attended training in the Netherlands organized by AFC Ajax while in 2014 he took part in a training camp on Sint Maarten held by the New York Red Bulls of Major League Soccer. For his performances at the Red Bull camp, he was awarded the event's Excellence Award.

In 2016, Essed took part in the 2016 West Virginia Tri-State Elite College Combine in hopes of securing a spot to play college soccer in the United States. In 2016, he decided to join the Golden Eagles of Feather River College in Quincy, California. During the season, he scored three goals in fourteen matches. After one season with the team, Essed transferred to Northeastern Junior College in Sterling, Colorado. Despite being announced as a transfer student, he never appeared on the team's roster. By 2018 he was no longer playing college soccer in the United States and had begun studying in Amsterdam. During this time he also worked as a youth coach at Dutch club WV-HEDW.

== Club career ==
Essed played for RISC Takers FC of the SMSA Senior League until 2014. By age 15, he was a starter for Flames United SC. In Summer 2014 at age 16 he was invited to train with FC Dordrecht who were at the time in the Eredivisie, the top level of football in the Netherlands. He has also had a trial with Dutch powerhouse AFC Ajax.

In December 2017 it was announced that Essed would take part in the MLS Caribbean Combine The following month. The combine was organized by Major League Soccer to scout players from the Caribbean region with the potential to sign them to MLS or United Soccer League contracts.

== International career ==
Essed first represented Sint Maarten in the 2013 CONCACAF Under-15 Championship held in the Cayman Islands. It was at that tournament that his primary position became centre-back.

Essed made his senior international debut for Sint Maarten in a friendly against Anguilla on 13 March 2016 at age 17. He started the match and played the full 90 minutes. The match was Sint Maarten's first senior international in 12 years and was played in preparation for each side's 2017 Caribbean Cup qualification campaigns which were set to begin the following week. He played in both of Sint Maarten's Caribbean Cup qualifiers, Sint Maarten's first competitive matches in 19 years.

In 2016, he was also called up to be part of Sint Maarten's U20 squad and was called up again in June for 2017 CONCACAF U-20 Championship qualifying as Sint Maarten hosted their group. The team suffered three defeats in the opening round of the tournament and were eliminated. Essed served as captain of the team for the tournament.

=== International career statistics ===
As of match played 24 March 2019.

Sint Maarten national team
Year	Apps	Goals
2016	3	0
2017	0	0
2018	2	0
2019	2	1
Total	7	1

=== International goals ===
Scores and results list Sint Maarten's goal tally first.

No.	Date	Venue	Opponent	Score	Result	Competition
1.	23 February 2019	Raoul Illidge Sports Complex, Philipsburg, Sint Maarten	Saint Barthélemy	1–0	1–1	Friendly
