= Luke Paris =

Anguillan footballer

Personal information
- Date of birth: 11 November 1994 (age 31)
- Place of birth: England
- Position: Defender

Team information
- Current team: Uxbridge

Senior career*
| Years | Team | Apps | (Gls) |
| 2017–2018 | Burnham | 13 | (0) |
| 2018–2020 | Langley | 32 | |
| 2020–2022 | Windsor | | |
| 2022– | Uxbridge | 44 | (4) |

International career^{‡}
| 2019– | Anguilla | 17 | (1) |
- * Club domestic league appearances and goals as of 18:34, 4 January 2023 (UTC) ‡ National team caps and goals as of 03:41, 3 May 2026 (UTC)

Luke Paris (born 11 November 1994) is a professional footballer who plays as a defender for Southern League Premier Division South club Uxbridge. Born in England, he plays for the Anguilla national team.

== Career ==
Paris started his career with Hellenic League Premier Division (at the 9th step of the pyramid) team Burnham in 2017, where his father Alan was working as manager. He then joined Hellenic League Division Two East (12th tier) side Langley, following his father who went to manage Langley. He made 27 appearances in the 2018–19 season and helped the team get promoted to the Hellenic League Division One East (the 10th tier). The team also made it to the Slough Town Challenge Cup final, but lost 2–1 to Singh Sabha Slough FC, where Paris also got sent off for fighting with opposition player Sukh Hunjan in injury time. He then joined Hellenic Premier Division team Windsor in the summer of 2020. After two years at the club, he joined Isthmian League South Central Division (step 8) team Uxbridge.

== International career ==
Paris made his senior international debut on 5 September 2019 in a 10–0 defeat to Guatemala during the CONCACAF Nations League.

== Personal life ==
Paris is eligible to play for the Anguilla national football team through his grandmother. His father, Alan Paris, was a right-back for Leicester City and Notts County, among other teams. His cousin Calvin Morgan also plays for Anguilla. While playing for Langley, Paris was also an IT worker for a logistics company in Maidenhead.

== Career statistics ==
=== International ===
As of match played 29 March 2026

| National team | Year | Apps | Goals |
|---|---|---|---|
| Anguilla | 2019 | 5 | 0 |
| Anguilla | 2020 | 0 | 0 |
| Anguilla | 2021 | 3 | 0 |
| Anguilla | 2022 | 3 | 0 |
| Anguilla | 2023 | 1 | 0 |
| Anguilla | 2024 | 2 | 1 |
| Anguilla | 2025 | 1 | 0 |
| Anguilla | 2026 | 2 | 0 |
| Total | | 17 | 1 |

Scores and results list Anguilla's goal tally first, score column indicates score after each Paris goal.

List of international goals scored by Luke Paris
| No. | Date | Venue | Opponent | Score | Result | Competition | Ref. |
|---|---|---|---|---|---|---|---|
| 1 | 26 March 2024 | TCIFA National Stadium, Providenciales, Turks and Caicos Islands | Turks and Caicos Islands | 1–1 | 1–1 (a.e.t.) (4–3 p) | 2026 FIFA World Cup qualification | |
