= Brian-Paul Tesselaar =

Anguillan footballer

Personal information
- Full name: Brian-Paul Frits Tesselaar
- Date of birth: 24 December 1989 (age 36)
- Place of birth: Purmerend, Netherlands
- Height: 1.90 m (6 ft 3 in)
- Position: Defender

Team information
- Current team: LSVV

Youth career
- –2008: AFC '34

International career^{‡}
Years	Team	Apps	(Gls)
2022–	Anguilla	2	(0)
- ‡ National team caps and goals as of 13 February 2022

Brian-Paul Frits Tesselaar (born 24 December 1989) is a football player who plays for LSVV. Born in the Netherlands, he represents the Anguilla national team.

== International career ==
Tesselaar was called up to the Anguilla national team in January 2022 for a friendly against the British Virgin Islands. He and his brother, Jan-Willem, went on to make their international debuts in the eventual 2–1 victory on 27 January. The players qualify to represent the island nation through their grandmother.

== Career statistics ==
=== International ===
As of match played 13 February 2022

National team	Year	Apps	Goals
Anguilla	2022	2	0
Total		2	0
