= 2026 FIFA World Cup qualification (CONCACAF) =

Association football tournament

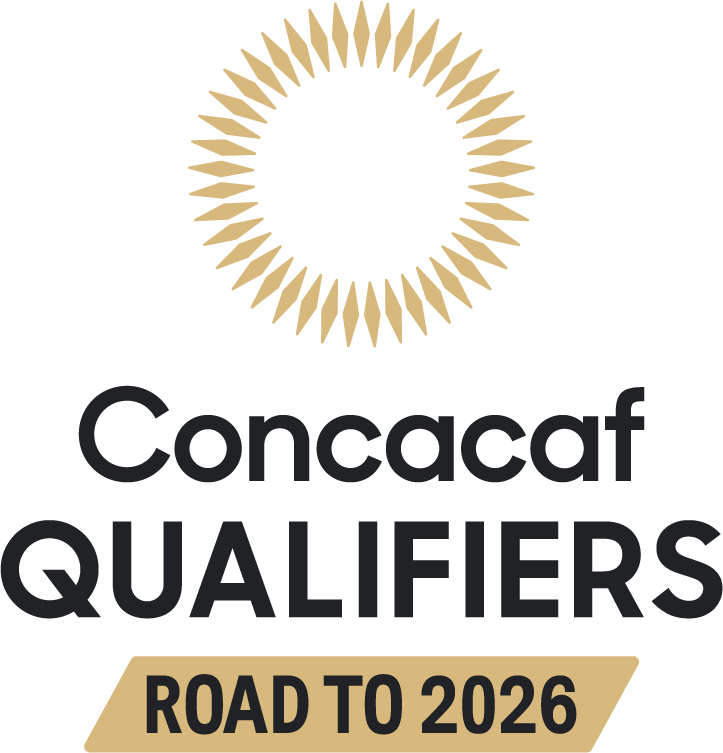

Tournament details
- Dates: 22 March 2024 – 18 November 2025
- Teams: 32 (from 1 confederation)

Tournament statistics
- Matches played: 99
- Goals scored: 309 (3.12 per match)
- Attendance: 794,013 (8,020 per match)
- Top scorer(s): (Guatemala) Óscar Santis (Haiti) Duckens Nazon (6 goals each)

The North, Central American and Caribbean section of the 2026 FIFA World Cup qualification acted as the qualifiers for the 2026 FIFA World Cup, held in Canada, Mexico, and the United States, for national teams which were members of the Confederation of North, Central American and Caribbean Association Football (CONCACAF). Three direct slots and two inter-confederation play-off slots in the final tournament were available for CONCACAF teams.

== Format ==
On 9 May 2017, the FIFA Council approved the slot allocation for the 2026 FIFA World Cup, which included six direct spots and two inter-confederation play-off spots for the CONCACAF region. However, in a change of format from previous World Cups, there would be no dedicated host country slot, with the slots of automatically qualifying host countries now taken from the quota of its confederation. If the tournament were to be co-hosted, the FIFA Council would decide which host countries would qualify automatically. On 13 June 2018, three members of CONCACAF—Canada, Mexico and the United States—were selected as hosts for the 2026 World Cup by the 68th FIFA Congress.

On 14 February 2023, the FIFA Council awarded automatic berths for all three host countries, leaving three direct slots and two inter-confederation play-off slots to be decided through CONCACAF qualification. On 28 February, CONCACAF announced the qualifying format for 2026 World Cup qualification.

- First round: Four CONCACAF teams, ranked 29 to 32 based on the FIFA rankings of December 2023, were divided into two matchups, played on a two-legged home-and-away basis. The two winners advanced to the second round.
- Second round: Thirty teams, the two winners from the first round and CONCACAF teams ranked 1 to 28 based on the FIFA rankings of December 2023, were drawn into six groups of five teams. They played single round-robin matches (two home and two away), with group winners and runners-up advancing to the third round.
- Third round: The twelve teams advancing from the second round were drawn into three groups of four teams. They played double round-robin home-and-away matches, with the three group winners qualifying for the World Cup. The two best-ranked runners-up advanced to the inter-confederation play-offs.

== Entrants ==
As Canada, Mexico, and the United States were awarded automatic berths as co-hosts, they did not enter qualifying. All the remaining 32 FIFA-affiliated national teams from CONCACAF entered qualification. Based on the FIFA rankings of December 2023, the top 28 teams received a bye to the second round, while the lowest four teams entered the first round.

From the December 2023 FIFA World Rankings
| Second round pot 1 | Second round pot 2 | Second round pot 3 |
|---|---|---|
| 1. Panama (41); 2. Costa Rica (52); 3. Jamaica (55); 4. Honduras (76); 5. El Salvador (78); 6. Haiti (89) | 7. Curaçao (90); 8. Trinidad and Tobago (96); 9. Guatemala (108); 10. Nicaragua (134); 11. Antigua and Barbuda (142); 12. Suriname (143) | 13. Saint Kitts and Nevis (147); 14. Dominican Republic (151); 15. Guyana (157); 16. Puerto Rico (160); 17. Saint Lucia (167); 18. Cuba (169) |
| Second round pot 4 | Second round pot 5 | Competed in first round |
| 19. Bermuda (171); 20. Saint Vincent and the Grenadines (173); 21. Grenada (174); 22. Montserrat (176); 23. Barbados (178); 24. Dominica (180) | 25. Belize (182); 26. Aruba (193); 27. Cayman Islands (197); 28. Bahamas (202) | 29. Turks and Caicos Islands (206); 30. British Virgin Islands (207); 31. U.S. Virgin Islands (208); 32. Anguilla (209) |

Note: Teams in italics competed only in the first round.

== Schedule ==
The CONCACAF schedule for qualification was as follows:

| Round | Matchday | Dates |
|---|---|---|
| First round | First leg | 22 March 2024 |
| First round | Second leg | 26 March 2024 |
| Second round | Window 1 | 5–11 June 2024 |
| Second round | Window 2 | 4–10 June 2025 |
| Third round | Matchday 1 | 4–5 September 2025 |
| Third round | Matchday 2 | 8–9 September 2025 |
| Third round | Matchday 3 | 9–10 October 2025 |
| Third round | Matchday 4 | 13–14 October 2025 |
| Third round | Matchday 5 | 13 November 2025 |
| Third round | Matchday 6 | 18 November 2025 |

== First round ==
The bottom four CONCACAF teams, ranked 29 to 32 based on the FIFA rankings of December 2023, were divided into two matchups to be played on a two-legged home-and-away basis. The pairings were predetermined, with the 29th ranked team facing the 32nd ranked team, and the 30th ranked team facing the 31st ranked team. The two winners advanced to the second round.

| Team 1 | Agg. | Team 2 | 1st leg | 2nd leg |
|---|---|---|---|---|
| Anguilla | 1–1 (4–3 p) | Turks and Caicos Islands | 0–0 | 1–1 (a.e.t.) |
| U.S. Virgin Islands | 1–1 (2–4 p) | British Virgin Islands | 1–1 | 0–0 (a.e.t.) |

== Second round ==
The draw took place on 25 January 2024 in Zürich, Switzerland.

The top twenty-eight CONCACAF teams in the FIFA rankings of December 2023 entered in the second round, joined by the two winners of the first round. Teams were drawn into six groups of five teams and played single round-robin matches (two home and two away). The six group winners and six group runners-up advanced to the third round.

=== Group A ===
| Pos | Team | Pld | W | D | L | GF | GA | GD | Pts | Qualification | (Honduras) | (Bermuda) | (Cuba) | (Cayman Islands) | (Antigua and Barbuda) |
|---|---|---|---|---|---|---|---|---|---|---|---|---|---|---|---|
| 1 | Honduras | 4 | 4 | 0 | 0 | 12 | 2 | +10 | 12 | Advance to third round | — | — | 3–1 | — | 2–0 |
| 2 | Bermuda | 4 | 2 | 1 | 1 | 9 | 8 | +1 | 7 | Advance to third round | 1–6 | — | — | 5–0 | — |
| 3 | Cuba | 4 | 2 | 0 | 2 | 6 | 5 | +1 | 6 | | — | 1–2 | — | 3–0 (Note: Cuba were awarded a 3–0 victory by forfeit after Cayman Islands were prevented from traveling to Cuba by visa issues stemming from the United States government's restrictions on travel to Cuba.) | — |
| 4 | Cayman Islands | 4 | 1 | 0 | 3 | 1 | 9 | −8 | 3 | | 0–1 | — | — | — | 1–0 |
| 5 | Antigua and Barbuda | 4 | 0 | 1 | 3 | 1 | 5 | −4 | 1 | | — | 1–1 | 0–1 | — | — |

Source: FIFA
Rules for classification: Tiebreakers

=== Group B ===
| Pos | Team | Pld | W | D | L | GF | GA | GD | Pts | Qualification | (Costa Rica) | (Trinidad and Tobago) | (Grenada) | (Saint Kitts and Nevis) | (The Bahamas) |
|---|---|---|---|---|---|---|---|---|---|---|---|---|---|---|---|
| 1 | Costa Rica | 4 | 4 | 0 | 0 | 17 | 1 | +16 | 12 | Advance to third round | — | 2–1 | — | 4–0 | — |
| 2 | Trinidad and Tobago | 4 | 2 | 1 | 1 | 16 | 7 | +9 | 7 | Advance to third round | — | — | 2–2 | 6–2 | — |
| 3 | Grenada | 4 | 2 | 1 | 1 | 11 | 7 | +4 | 7 | | 0–3 | — | — | — | 6–0 |
| 4 | Saint Kitts and Nevis | 4 | 1 | 0 | 3 | 5 | 13 | −8 | 3 | | — | — | 2–3 | — | 1–0 |
| 5 | Bahamas | 4 | 0 | 0 | 4 | 1 | 22 | −21 | 0 | | 0–8 | 1–7 | — | — | — |

Source: FIFA
Rules for classification: Tiebreakers

=== Group C ===
| Pos | Team | Pld | W | D | L | GF | GA | GD | Pts | Qualification | (Curaçao) | (Haiti) | (Saint Lucia) | (Aruba) | (Barbados) |
|---|---|---|---|---|---|---|---|---|---|---|---|---|---|---|---|
| 1 | Curaçao | 4 | 4 | 0 | 0 | 15 | 2 | +13 | 12 | Advance to third round | — | — | 4–0 | — | 4–1 |
| 2 | Haiti | 4 | 3 | 0 | 1 | 11 | 7 | +4 | 9 | Advance to third round | 1–5 | — | 2–1 | — | — |
| 3 | Saint Lucia | 4 | 1 | 1 | 2 | 5 | 9 | −4 | 4 | | — | — | — | 2–2 | 2–1 |
| 4 | Aruba | 4 | 0 | 2 | 2 | 3 | 10 | −7 | 2 | | 0–2 | 0–5 | — | — | — |
| 5 | Barbados | 4 | 0 | 1 | 3 | 4 | 10 | −6 | 1 | | — | 1–3 | — | 1–1 | — |

Source: FIFA
Rules for classification: Tiebreakers

=== Group D ===
| Pos | Team | Pld | W | D | L | GF | GA | GD | Pts | Qualification | (Panama) | (Nicaragua) | (Guyana) | (Montserrat) | (Belize) |
|---|---|---|---|---|---|---|---|---|---|---|---|---|---|---|---|
| 1 | Panama | 4 | 4 | 0 | 0 | 10 | 1 | +9 | 12 | Advance to third round | — | 3–0 | 2–0 | — | — |
| 2 | Nicaragua | 4 | 3 | 0 | 1 | 9 | 4 | +5 | 9 | Advance to third round | — | — | 1–0 | 4–1 | — |
| 3 | Guyana | 4 | 2 | 0 | 2 | 6 | 4 | +2 | 6 | | — | — | — | 3–0 | 3–1 |
| 4 | Montserrat | 4 | 1 | 0 | 3 | 3 | 10 | −7 | 3 | | 1–3 | — | — | — | 1–0 |
| 5 | Belize | 4 | 0 | 0 | 4 | 1 | 10 | −9 | 0 | | 0–2 | 0–4 | — | — | — |

Source: FIFA
Rules for classification: Tiebreakers

=== Group E ===
| Pos | Team | Pld | W | D | L | GF | GA | GD | Pts | Qualification | (Jamaica) | (Guatemala) | (Dominican Republic) | (Dominica) | (British Virgin Islands) |
|---|---|---|---|---|---|---|---|---|---|---|---|---|---|---|---|
| 1 | Jamaica | 4 | 4 | 0 | 0 | 8 | 2 | +6 | 12 | Advance to third round | — | 3–0 | 1–0 | — | — |
| 2 | Guatemala | 4 | 3 | 0 | 1 | 13 | 5 | +8 | 9 | Advance to third round | — | — | 4–2 | 6–0 | — |
| 3 | Dominican Republic | 4 | 2 | 0 | 2 | 11 | 5 | +6 | 6 | | — | — | — | 5–0 | 4–0 |
| 4 | Dominica | 4 | 1 | 0 | 3 | 5 | 14 | −9 | 3 | | 2–3 | — | — | — | 3–0 |
| 5 | British Virgin Islands | 4 | 0 | 0 | 4 | 0 | 11 | −11 | 0 | | 0–1 | 0–3 | — | — | — |

Source: FIFA
Rules for classification: Tiebreakers

=== Group F ===
| Pos | Team | Pld | W | D | L | GF | GA | GD | Pts | Qualification | (Suriname) | (El Salvador) | (Puerto Rico) | (Saint Vincent and the Grenadines) | (Anguilla) |
|---|---|---|---|---|---|---|---|---|---|---|---|---|---|---|---|
| 1 | Suriname | 4 | 3 | 1 | 0 | 10 | 2 | +8 | 10 | Advance to third round | — | — | 1–0 | 4–1 | — |
| 2 | El Salvador | 4 | 2 | 2 | 0 | 7 | 2 | +5 | 8 | Advance to third round | 1–1 | — | 0–0 | — | — |
| 3 | Puerto Rico | 4 | 2 | 1 | 1 | 10 | 2 | +8 | 7 | | — | — | — | 2–1 | 8–0 |
| 4 | Saint Vincent and the Grenadines | 4 | 1 | 0 | 3 | 9 | 9 | 0 | 3 | | — | 1–3 | — | — | 6–0 |
| 5 | Anguilla | 4 | 0 | 0 | 4 | 0 | 21 | −21 | 0 | | 0–4 | 0–3 | — | — | — |

Source: FIFA
Rules for classification: Tiebreakers

== Third round ==
In the third round, the twelve teams advancing from the second round were drawn into three groups of four teams to play round-robin home-and-away matches. The three group winners qualified for the World Cup, and the two best-ranked runners-up advanced to the inter-confederation play-offs. The draw for the third round was held on 12 June 2025, 19:00 EDT.

=== Group A ===
| Pos | Team | Pld | W | D | L | GF | GA | GD | Pts | Qualification | (Panama) | (Suriname) | (Guatemala) | (El Salvador) |
|---|---|---|---|---|---|---|---|---|---|---|---|---|---|---|
| 1 | Panama | 6 | 3 | 3 | 0 | 9 | 4 | +5 | 12 | 2026 FIFA World Cup | — | 1–1 | 1–1 | 3–0 |
| 2 | Suriname | 6 | 2 | 3 | 1 | 9 | 6 | +3 | 9 | Inter-confederation play-offs | 0–0 | — | 1–1 | 4–0 |
| 3 | Guatemala | 6 | 2 | 2 | 2 | 8 | 7 | +1 | 8 | | 2–3 | 3–1 | — | 0–1 |
| 4 | El Salvador | 6 | 1 | 0 | 5 | 2 | 11 | −9 | 3 | | 0–1 | 1–2 | 0–1 | — |

Source: FIFA
Rules for classification: Tiebreakers

=== Group B ===
| Pos | Team | Pld | W | D | L | GF | GA | GD | Pts | Qualification | (Curaçao) | (Jamaica) | (Trinidad and Tobago) | (Bermuda) |
|---|---|---|---|---|---|---|---|---|---|---|---|---|---|---|
| 1 | Curaçao | 6 | 3 | 3 | 0 | 13 | 3 | +10 | 12 | 2026 FIFA World Cup | — | 2–0 | 1–1 | 3–2 |
| 2 | Jamaica | 6 | 3 | 2 | 1 | 11 | 3 | +8 | 11 | Inter-confederation play-offs | 0–0 | — | 2–0 | 4–0 |
| 3 | Trinidad and Tobago | 6 | 1 | 4 | 1 | 7 | 6 | +1 | 7 | | 0–0 | 1–1 | — | 2–2 |
| 4 | Bermuda | 6 | 0 | 1 | 5 | 4 | 23 | −19 | 1 | | 0–7 | 0–4 | 0–3 | — |

Source: FIFA
Rules for classification: Tiebreakers

=== Group C ===
| Pos | Team | Pld | W | D | L | GF | GA | GD | Pts | Qualification | (Haiti) | (Honduras) | (Costa Rica) | (Nicaragua) |
|---|---|---|---|---|---|---|---|---|---|---|---|---|---|---|
| 1 | Haiti | 6 | 3 | 2 | 1 | 9 | 6 | +3 | 11 | 2026 FIFA World Cup | — | 0–0 | 1–0 | 2–0 |
| 2 | Honduras | 6 | 2 | 3 | 1 | 5 | 2 | +3 | 9 | | 3–0 | — | 0–0 | 2–0 |
| 3 | Costa Rica | 6 | 1 | 4 | 1 | 8 | 6 | +2 | 7 | | 3–3 | 0–0 | — | 4–1 |
| 4 | Nicaragua | 6 | 1 | 1 | 4 | 4 | 12 | −8 | 4 | | 0–3 | 2–0 | 1–1 | — |

Source: FIFA
Rules for classification: Tiebreakers

=== Ranking of second-placed teams ===
| Pos | Grp | Team | Pld | W | D | L | GF | GA | GD | Pts | Qualification |
|---|---|---|---|---|---|---|---|---|---|---|---|
| 1 | B | Jamaica | 6 | 3 | 2 | 1 | 11 | 3 | +8 | 11 | Advance to inter-confederation play-offs |
| 2 | A | Suriname | 6 | 2 | 3 | 1 | 9 | 6 | +3 | 9 | Advance to inter-confederation play-offs |
| 3 | C | Honduras | 6 | 2 | 3 | 1 | 5 | 2 | +3 | 9 | |

Source: FIFA
Rules for classification: Tiebreakers

== Inter-confederation play-offs ==
The two best runners-up from the third round, Jamaica and Suriname, joined Bolivia (from CONMEBOL), DR Congo (from CAF), Iraq (from AFC), and New Caledonia (from OFC) in the inter-confederation play-offs.

The teams were ranked according to the November 2025 FIFA Men's World Ranking, with the four lowest-ranked teams playing in two single-elimination matches. The winners met the two highest-ranked teams in another set of single-elimination matches, with the winners of these matches qualifying for the 2026 FIFA World Cup.

Semi-final
26 March 2026 – Zapopan
New Caledonia | 0
Jamaica | 1

Final
31 March 2026 – Zapopan
DR Congo (a.e.t.) | 1
Jamaica | 0

Semi-final
26 March 2026 – Guadalupe
Bolivia | 2
Suriname | 1

Final
31 March 2026 – Guadalupe
Iraq | 2
Bolivia | 1

== Qualified teams ==
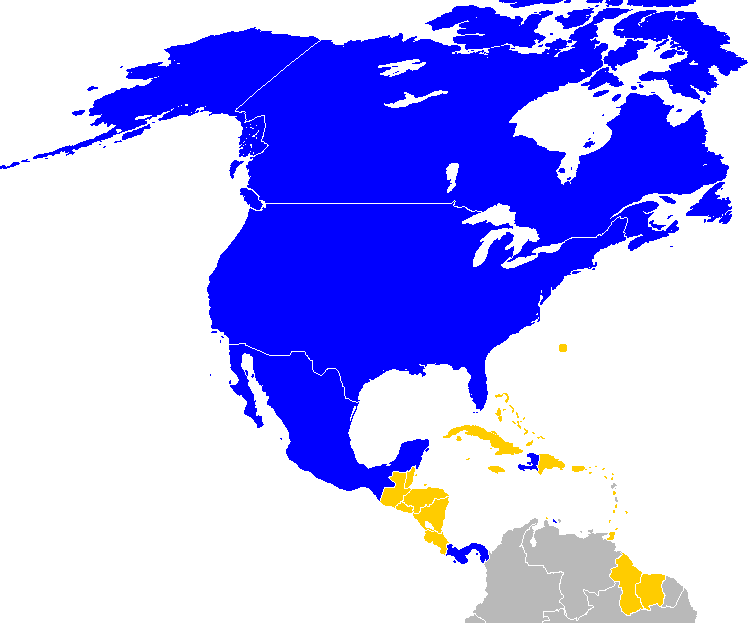
Qualified for the World Cup Failed to qualify Not a CONCACAF member or not a FIFA member

The following teams from CONCACAF qualified for the final tournament.

| Team | Qualified as | Qualified on | Previous appearances in FIFA World Cup (Note: Italic indicates hosts for that year.) |
|---|---|---|---|
| Canada | Co-hosts | 14 February 2023 (Note: Although the United bid was selected on 13 June 2018, the automatic berths allocated to the hosts were not confirmed until a decision by the FIFA Council on 14 February 2023.) | 2 (1986, 2022) |
| Mexico | Co-hosts | 14 February 2023 | 17 (1930, 1950, 1954, 1958, 1962, 1966, 1970, 1978, 1986, 1994, 1998, 2002, 2006, 2010, 2014, 2018, 2022) |
| United States | Co-hosts | 14 February 2023 | 11 (1930, 1934, 1950, 1990, 1994, 1998, 2002, 2006, 2010, 2014, 2022) |
| Panama | Third round Group A winners | 18 November 2025 | 1 (2018) |
| Curaçao | Third round Group B winners | 18 November 2025 | Debut |
| Haiti | Third round Group C winners | 18 November 2025 | 1 (1974) |

== Top goalscorers ==
There were 309 goals scored in 99 matches, for an average of 3.12 goals per match.

6 goals

- (Guatemala national football team) Óscar Santis
- (Haiti national football team) Duckens Nazon

5 goals

- (Curaçao national football team) Gervane Kastaneer
- (Jamaica national football team) Shamar Nicholson
- (Saint Vincent and the Grenadines national football team) Oalex Anderson

4 goals

- (Bermuda national football team) Djair Parfitt
- (Costa Rica national football team) Alonso Martínez
- (Dominican Republic national football team) Dorny Romero
- (Haiti national football team) Louicius Deedson
- (Nicaragua national football team) Jaime Moreno

3 goals

- (Costa Rica national football team) Orlando Galo
- (Costa Rica national football team) Warren Madrigal
- (Costa Rica national football team) Manfred Ugalde
- (Curaçao national football team) Juninho Bacuna
- (Curaçao national football team) Kenji Gorré
- (Curaçao national football team) Rangelo Janga
- (Jamaica national football team) Warner Brown
- (Nicaragua national football team) Bancy Hernández
- (Panama national football team) José Fajardo
- (Panama national football team) José Luis Rodríguez
- (Saint Lucia national football team) Caniggia Elva
- (Suriname national football team) Richonell Margaret
- (Trinidad and Tobago national football team) Nathaniel James
- (Trinidad and Tobago national football team) Dante Sealy

Below are full goalscorer lists for each round:

- First round
- Second round
- Third round
