= Juan Morales =

Juan Morales may refer to:

- Juan Morales (cyclist) (born 1949), Colombian Olympic cyclist
- Juan Morales (distance runner) (1909–?), Mexican long-distance runner
- Juan Morales (hurdler) (born 1948), Cuban hurdler
- Juan Morales (Peruvian footballer) (born 1989), Peruvian footballer for CD Universidad César Vallejo
- Juan Morales Rodríguez (born 1972), Puerto Rican politician from the New Progressive Party
- Juan Morales (Uruguayan footballer)
- Juan Alberto Morales (born 1961), American Anglican bishop
- Juan Antonio Morales (basketball) (born 1969), Spanish basketball player
- Juan Antonio Morales (politician) (born 1970), Spanish politician
- Juan Bautista Morales (1597–1664), Spanish Dominican missionary in China
- Juan Carlos Morales (born 1992), Mexican footballer
- Juan José Morales (born 1982), Argentine footballer for Argentinos Juniors
- Juan Manuel Morales (born 1988), Uruguayan footballer for Deportivo Saprissa S.A.D.
