= Kian Duncan =

Anguillan footballer

Personal information
- Date of birth: 26 May 2000 (age 26)
- Place of birth: England
- Position: Midfielder

Team information
- Current team: Binfield

Youth career
- Wokingham & Emmbrook
- Portsmouth
- FAB Academy
- Beaconsfield Town

Senior career*
Years	Team	Apps	(Gls)
2018	Burnham		
2019	Basingstoke Town	6	(0)
2019	→ Burnham (loan)		
2019–2021	Burnham		
2021–	Binfield	16	(0)

International career^{‡}
2021–	Anguilla	12	(0)
- * Club domestic league appearances and goals ‡ National team caps and goals as of 26 March 2024

Kian Duncan (born 26 May 2000) is a professional footballer who plays as a midfielder for Isthmian League South Central Division club Binfield. Born in England, he plays for the Anguilla national team.

== Club career ==
Duncan started his career with Wokingham & Emmbrook, who he represented at youth level. He also played at the FAB Academy in Bisham Abbey, and played for Beaconsfield Town. He also played for Portsmouth at youth level.

By 2018, Duncan was playing for Burnham. He played for Basingstoke Town in 2019, where he made a total of six appearances. He was loaned back to Burnham during 2019, and made the move permanent later in the year. He was made captain in 2020.

In August 2021, Duncan signed for Binfield.

== Career statistics ==
=== Club ===
As of 30 January 2022.

Club	Season	League			FA Cup (Note: Includes preliminary rounds)		Other		Total	
Club	Season	Division	Apps	Goals	Apps	Goals	Apps	Goals	Apps	Goals
Basingstoke Town	2018–19	Southern Football League	6	0	0	0	0	0	6	0
Binfield	2021–22	Isthmian League	16	0	1	0	3 (Note: Two appearances in FA Trophy qualification, one appearance in the Alan Turvey Trophy)	0	20	0
Career total			22	0	1	0	3	0	26	0

=== International ===
As of matches played 12 June 2022.

National team	Year	Apps	Goals
Anguilla	2021	4	0
Anguilla	2022	3	0
Total		7	0
