= Nigel Connor =

Anguillan footballer

Personal information
- Date of birth: 14 October 1970 (age 56)
- Place of birth: Anguilla
- Position: Defender

Senior career*
Years	Team	Apps	(Gls)
- Roaring Lions

International career
2004–2008	Anguilla	4	(0)

Managerial career
- Roaring Lions
- 2018–2019: Anguilla
- 2022–2023: Anguilla
- * Club domestic league appearances and goals

Nigel Connor (born 14 October 1970) is an Anguillian football manager who managed Anguilla.

== Career ==
=== Playing career ===
Connor started his playing career with Anguillian side Roaring Lions, helping them in the league.

=== Managerial career ===
Connor started his managerial career with Roaring Lions in Anguilla, helping them in the league. In 2018, he was appointed manager of Anguilla. In 2022, Connor was appointed manager of Anguilla for the second time.
