= Vernon Hodge =

Anguillan football manager

Personal information
- Place of birth: Anguilla

Managerial career
- Years: Team
- 2003–2004: Anguilla
- 2005–2007: Anguilla

Vernon Hodge is an Anguillan professional football manager.

== Career ==
In 2003–2004 and since 2005 until 2007 he coached the Anguilla national football team.
