= Kerthney Carty =

English football manager

Personal information
- Date of birth: 4 February 1962 (age 64)
- Place of birth: England

Managerial career
- Years: Team
- 2008: Anguilla

Kerthney Carty (born 4 February 1962) is an English professional football manager.

== Career ==
Since January until March 2008 he coached the Anguilla national football team.
