= Juan Antonio Morales (politician) =

Spanish politician

Juan Antonio Morales Álvarez (born 13 October 1970) is a Spanish politician.

== Biography ==
Born in Badajoz, Extremadura, Morales was the mayor of Lobón in the Province of Badajoz from 1995 to 2012. He was a member of the provincial deputation from 1999 to 2011, when he was elected to the Assembly of Extremadura. He attended an event on 2 December 2016 – Francisco Franco's birthday – in which he received an award from the Franco Foundation for defending the dictator's memory.

In October 2014, Morales received two convictions. He had defamed a Lobón councillor by falsely accusing her of selling drugs to children, and had committed a public order offence at a council meeting in Valencia del Ventoso. He was fined €120 and legal costs for the first offence, and was sentenced to eight days of house arrest and a €360 fine for the latter.

In July 2018, Morales left the People's Party (PP) after opposing its regional recognition of the Historical Memory Law. He then joined Vox in September, becoming its first regional deputy. He led his new party in the 2019 Extremaduran regional election, in which they won no seats, having finished under the threshold of 5%.

Morales and several other Extremaduran politicians left Vox in April 2021, accusing it of hypocrisy for employing consultants and permanent staff despite its platform of lowering public spending.
