= Hugo Liziário =

British Virgin Islands footballer (born 2006)

Personal information
- Full name: Hugo Costa Liziário
- Date of birth: 12 February 1993 (age 33)
- Place of birth: Lisbon District, Portugal
- Position: Forward

Team information
- Current team: Wolues

Senior career*
Years	Team	Apps	(Gls)
- Wolues

International career^{‡}
2024–	British Virgin Islands	5	(1)
- * Club domestic league appearances and goals ‡ National team caps and goals as of 7 June 2025

Hugo Costa Liziário (born 12 February 1993) is a footballer who plays as a forward for Wolues. Born in Portugal, he is a British Virgin Islands international.

== Early life ==
Liziário was born on 12 February 1983. Born in Lisbon District, Portugal, he is a native of Cascais, Portugal. Growing up, he attended university in England, where he studied law.

== Club career ==
Liziário played for British Virgin Islands side Wolues.

== International career ==
Liziário is a British Virgin Islands international. During the spring and summer of 2024 and the summer of 2025, he played for the British Virgin Islands national football team for 2026 FIFA World Cup qualification.
