= Jermaine Woozencroft =

Jamaican footballer (born 1992)

Personal information
- Date of birth: 19 August 1992 (age 34)
- Position: Midfielder

Team information
- Current team: Montego Bay United

Senior career*
Years	Team	Apps	(Gls)
2011–	Montego Bay United	64	(1)

International career^{‡}
2013–	Jamaica	2	(0)
- * Club domestic league appearances and goals as of 8 June 2014 ‡ National team caps and goals as of 8 June 2014

Jermaine Woozencroft (born 19 August 1992) is a Jamaican international footballer who plays for Montego Bay United, as a midfielder.

== Career ==
Woozencroft has played club football for Montego Bay United. Woozencraft won the RSPL in 2013–2014 with Montego Bay United.

He made his international debut for Jamaica in 2013.

== Honours ==
- Jamaica National Premier League: 1

2014
