= Blowing Point, Anguilla =

Coordinates: 18.1771°N 63.0939°W

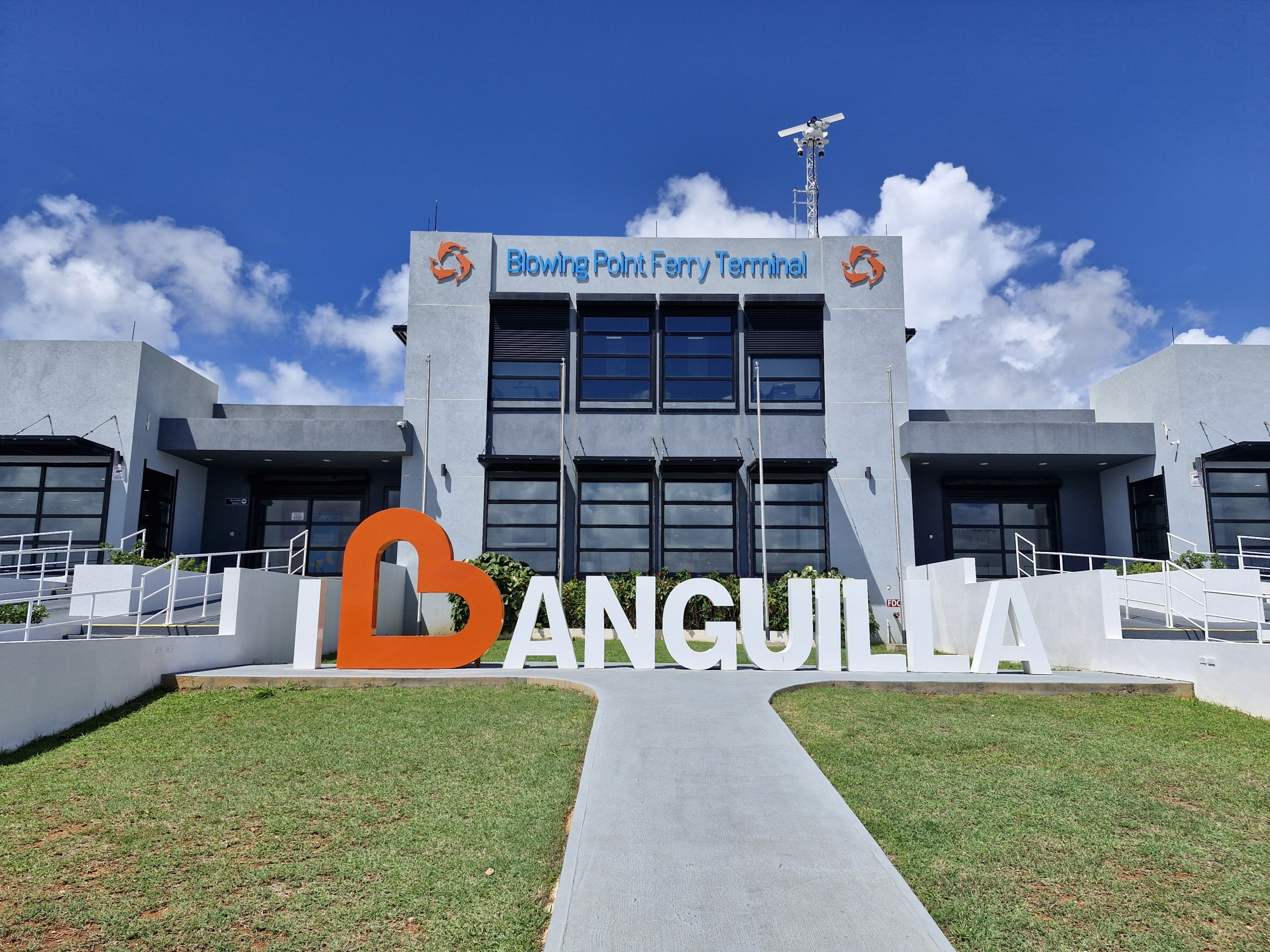
New Blowing Point Ferry Terminal entrance

Blowing Point is a village and one of the fourteen Districts of Anguila, located on the southern coast. It is home to Anguilla's ferry terminal.

== Transport ==
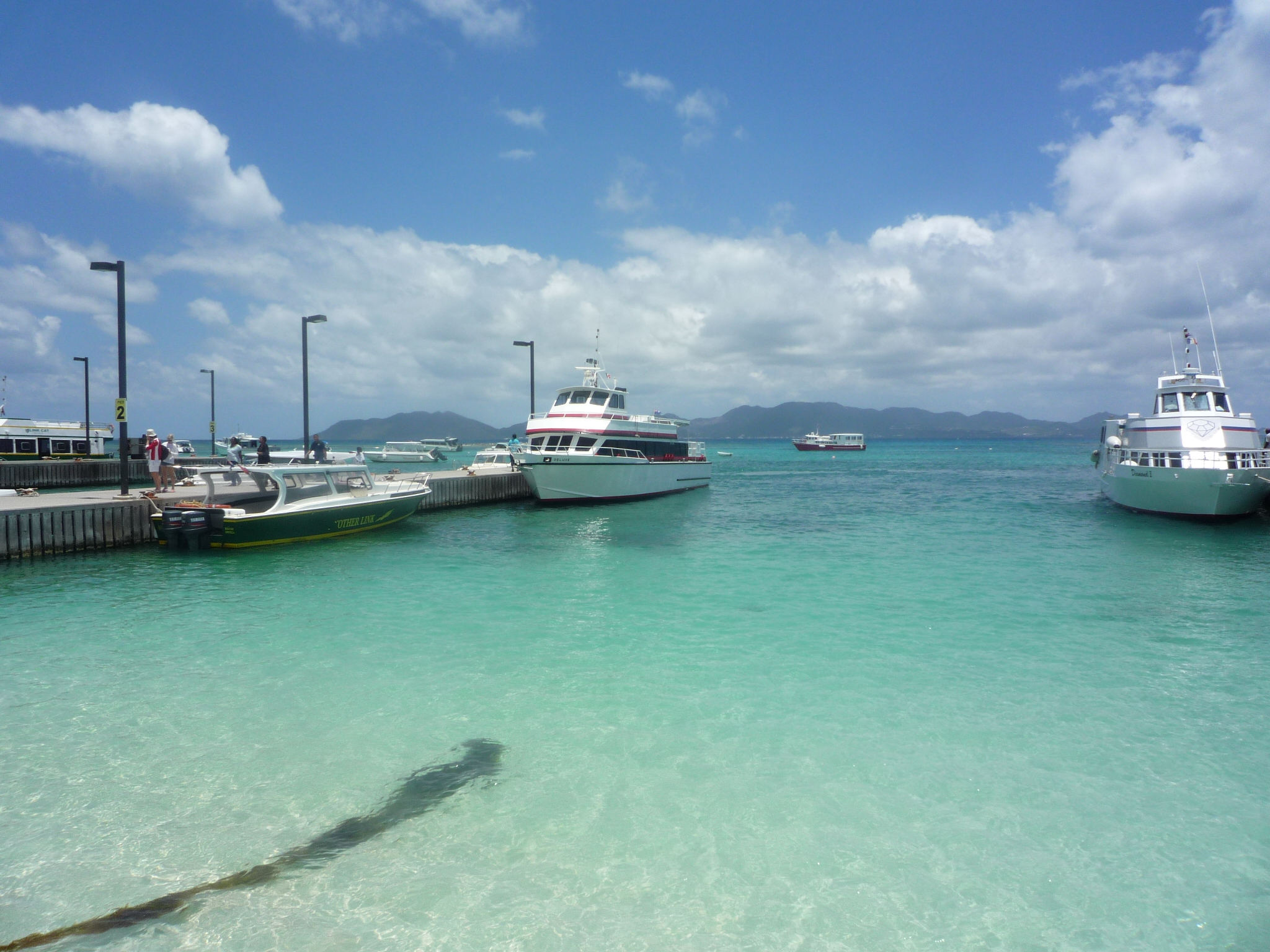
Blowing Point Ferry Terminal

=== Ferry Terminal ===
There are regular ferries from St. Martin to Anguilla providing a half hour service. It is a 20-minute crossing from Marigot to Blowing Point. Ferries commence service from 7:00 AM. There are also a charter services, from Blowing Point to Princess Juliana Airport which connect to in- and outgoing international flights. In 2007, 188,176 of the 271,959 people (both visitors and residents) entered Anguilla via the ferry terminal. This way of travel is the most common method of transport between Anguilla and St. Martin or Sint Maarten. The exiting terminal was redesigned and was opened in 2023.

== Demographics ==
Historical population
Year	Pop.	±%
1974	501	—
1984	463	−7.6%
1994	802	+73.2%
2001	779	−2.9%
2011	870	+11.7%
Source: Statoids.com

== Notable people ==
- Germain Hughes (born 1996), footballer

== Bibliography ==
- Jacobs Consultancy (2008). "MASTER PLAN PORT OF BLOWING POINT, ANGUILLA" (PDF). Canada. (dead link)
