= Shamoy Thompson =

British Virgin Islands football player (born 1997)

Personal information
- Full name: Shamoy T. Thompson
- Date of birth: 27 May 1997 (age 29)
- Place of birth: British Virgin Islands
- Position: Midfielder

Youth career
- 2013–2015: Elmore Stoutt High School

Senior career*
Years	Team	Apps	(Gls)
2013–201?	Virgin Gorda Ballstars		
2016–	HBA Panthers		
2017–	One Love United		(1)

International career^{‡}
2012	British Virgin Islands U17	3	(0)
2014–	British Virgin Islands	2	(0)
- * Club domestic league appearances and goals as of 21:11, 27 March 2017 (UTC) ‡ National team caps and goals as of 21:11, 16 May 2017 (UTC)

Shamoy T. Thompson (born 27 May 1997) is a British Virgin Islands football player who currently plays for the HBA Panthers and One Love United.

== International career ==
Thompson has represented BVI at under 17 and at international level. He was a young player that was part of the under 17 side beaten by Trinidad and Tobago 23–0 in 2012. He was called up in 2015 for a game against Antigua and Barbuda.
