= Jan-Willem Tesselaar =

Anguillan footballer (born 1997)

Personal information
- Date of birth: 21 October 1997 (age 29)
- Place of birth: Den Helder, Netherlands
- Height: 1.81 m (5 ft 11 in)
- Position: Forward

Team information
- Current team: Swift

Youth career
- –2012: AFC '34
- 2012–2016: AZ

Senior career*
Years	Team	Apps	(Gls)
2016–2018	Jong Utrecht	30	(1)
2018–2020	Katwijk	38	(5)
2020–2024	ADO '20	70	(17)
2024–	Swift		

International career^{‡}
2014	Netherlands U17	4	(0)
2022–	Anguilla	3	(2)
- * Club domestic league appearances and goals as of 22 November 2024 ‡ National team caps and goals as of 29 March 2026

Jan-Willem Tesselaar (born 21 October 1997) is a professional footballer who plays as a forward for Swift. Born in the Netherlands, he represents the Anguilla national team.

== Club career ==
He made his professional debut in the Eerste Divisie for Jong FC Utrecht on 16 September 2016 in a game against FC Volendam.

== International career ==
Tesselaar was called up to the Anguilla national team in January 2022 for a friendly against the British Virgin Islands. He and his brother, Brian-Paul, went on to make their international debuts in the eventual 2–1 victory on 27 January. The players qualify to represent the island nation through their grandmother.

== Career statistics ==
=== International ===
As of match played 27 January 2022

National team	Year	Apps	Goals
Anguilla	2022	1	0
Total		1	0
