= Germain Hughes =

Anguillan footballer

Personal information
- Full name: Germain Hughes
- Date of birth: 15 November 1996 (age 29)
- Place of birth: Blowing Point, Anguilla
- Height: 1.82 m (6 ft 0 in)
- Position: Midfielder

Team information
- Current team: Roaring Lions

Senior career*
Years	Team	Apps	(Gls)
2010–2015	Salsa Ballers FC	60	(8)
2015–2018	UWI Blackbirds	36	(2)
2018–2019	Heather St John's	15	(0)
2019	Leo	0	(0)
2020–	Roaring Lions	43	(37)
2022	Coggeshall Town		
2023	Cunupia	3	(1)

International career^{‡}
2011–2013	Anguilla U17	3	(0)
2015–2017	Anguilla U20	3	(0)
2012–	Anguilla	36	(2)
- * Club domestic league appearances and goals as of 2 September 2025 ‡ National team caps and goals as of 15 June 2025

Germain Hughes (born 15 November 1996) is an Anguillan professional footballer who plays as a defensive midfielder for TT Premier Football League club Cunupia F.C. and captains the Anguilla national team.

On 7 June 2025, he made his 36th international appearance and became the most capped player in Anguilla's team history.

== Club career ==
Hughes started his career at local side Salsa Ballers before accepting a scholarship at the University of the West Indies. During his studies he played in Barbados for UWI Blackbirds. In 2017 he was invited to the 2018 MLS Caribbean Combine, watched by MLS clubs, but did not earn a contract. After a year in England, he moved to Gibraltar to play for Leo on 16 June 2019. However, the club folded before the season started, leaving Hughes without a club. He then came back to Anguilla and joined the Roaring Lions FC, in the Anguilla Football League. Winning two championship with them in 2020 and 2021 before moving back to England in 2022. He then went on trials in England before joining the Coggeshall Town FC at the end of the 2022 season.

== International career ==
Hughes made his senior international debut on 10 October 2012 in a 2–0 away defeat to Saint Kitts and Nevis in Caribbean Cup qualification, becoming the youngest player to represent Anguilla at 15 years old. Ever since their 5–0 loss against Guatemala in the Nations League, he had been the captain of the team.

In June 2025, Germain Hughes became Anguilla's most-capped player, having made 36+ appearances for the national team.

== Career statistics ==
=== International ===
As of matches played 4 September 2024.

National team	Year	Apps	Goals
Anguilla	2012	3	0
Anguilla	2015	2	0
Anguilla	2018	2	0
Anguilla	2019	4	0
Anguilla	2021	4	0
Anguilla	2022	4	0
Anguilla	2023	3	1
Anguilla	2024	4	1
Total		26	2

Scores and results list Anguilla's goal tally first.

List of international goals scored by Germain Hughes
No.	Date	Venue	Opponent	Score	Result	Competition
1	4 March 2023	Raymond E. Guishard Technical Centre, The Valley, Anguilla	Saint Martin	1–0	2–2	Friendly
2	4 September 2024	TCIFA National Academy, Providenciales, Turks and Caicos Islands	Turks and Caicos Islands	1–0	2–0	2024–25 CONCACAF Nations League C
