= Anguilla national football team =

Men's association football team

Anguilla
- Association: Anguilla Football Association (AFA)
- Confederation: CONCACAF (North America)
- Sub-confederation: CFU (Caribbean)
- Head coach: Ewan Gunter
- Captain: Germain Hughes
- Most caps: Germain Hughes (36)
- Top scorer: Girdon Connor; Richard O'Connor; Terrence Rogers (5)
- Home stadium: Raymond E. Guishard Technical Centre
- FIFA code: AIA
First colours	Second colours	Third colours

FIFA ranking
- Current: 210 (7 October 2026)
- Highest: 189 (June–September 1997)
- Lowest: 210 (November 2019, March 2022, June 2026)

First international
- Anguilla 0–1 British Virgin Islands (The Valley, Anguilla; October 1985)

Biggest win
- Anguilla 4–1 Montserrat (Marigot, Saint Martin; 8 February 2001)

Biggest defeat
- Trinidad and Tobago 15–0 Anguilla (Couva, Trinidad and Tobago; 10 November 2019)

The Anguilla national football team represents Anguilla, a British overseas territory in men's international football, and is governed by the Anguilla Football Association, the governing body for football in Anguilla founded in 1990. It has been a full member of FIFA and CONCACAF since 1996, and is also a member of CFU in the Caribbean Zone.

Anguilla has never qualified for the FIFA World Cup and the CONCACAF Gold Cup, but has participated five times in League C of the CONCACAF Nations League.

Anguilla's debut in international competitions was in the 1991 Caribbean Cup qualifying tournament, and its first appearance in World Cup qualifiers was for 2002 qualification. The team's first victory was in 2000 by defeating British Virgin Islands 4–3.

== History ==
=== 2002 World Cup qualification ===
Anguilla entered the World Cup qualifiers for the first time for the 2002 World Cup in South Korea and Japan.

In the first round of the qualifiers, Anguilla were drawn against the Bahamas. On 5 March 2000, Anguilla hosted the first leg in front of 250 people at Webster Park in The Valley, losing by a scoreline of 3–1. In front of a Bahamian crowd of just 330, the second leg was played at the Thomas Robinson Stadium in Nassau on 19 March 2000, with Anguilla losing 2–1, and thereby eliminated by an aggregate scoreline of 5–2.

=== 2006 World Cup qualification ===
During the qualifiers for the 2006 World Cup in Germany, Anguilla faced the Dominican Republic in the first round. The first leg was played to a goalless draw at the Estadio Olímpico Juan Pablo Duarte in Santo Domingo on 19 March 2004. Newly introduced FIFA stadium requirements forced Anguilla to play their "home" leg at the same Dominican Republic stadium two days later, with the Dominican Republic winning the second leg and thus the first round by a scoreline of 6–0.

=== 2010 World Cup qualification ===
During the qualifiers for the 2010 World Cup in South Africa, Anguilla was drawn against El Salvador in the first round. On 6 February 2008, they lost 12–0 at the Estadio Cuscatlán in San Salvador, where striker Rudis Corrales scored five times and Ronald Cerritos three. This time, Anguilla played their "home leg" at RFK Stadium in Washington, D.C. in the United States on 26 March 2008. In front of 22,670 spectators, Anguilla lost the second leg 4–0, thereby losing to El Salvador by an aggregate score of 16–0.

=== 2014 World Cup qualification ===
In the first round of the qualifiers for the 2014 World Cup in Brazil, Anguilla were again drawn to play the Dominican Republic, as they had eight years previously. On 8 July 2011, they lost 2–0 at the Estadio Panamericano in San Cristobal, and losing 4–0 in the same Dominican Republic stadium just two days later. This put the Dominican Republic through to the second round with the same 6–0 aggregate scoreline as their previous encounter.

=== 2018 World Cup qualification ===
In the first round of the qualifiers for the 2018 World Cup in Russia, Anguilla were drawn to play Nicaragua. On 23 March 2015, they lost the first leg 5–0 at the Estadio Nacional Dennis Martínez in Managua, Nicaragua and, on 29 March 2015, were eliminated at Ronald Webster Park in The Valley in Anguilla with a 3–0 loss, to send Nicaragua through to the second round by a score of 8–0 on aggregate.

=== 2022 World Cup qualification ===
In the first round of the qualifiers for the 2022 World Cup in Qatar, Anguilla were drawn in group D with Dominica, Barbados, Dominican Republic, and Panama, each of whom they played once.

- Their first match was against Dominican Republic on 27 March 2021, at the DRV PNK Stadium in Fort Lauderdale. This was the third time the two teams had met in World Cup qualifying games. Anguilla lost 6–0: the same as the last two aggregate scores for the teams.
- On 31 March 2021, they faced Barbados at Estadio Olímpico Félix Sánchez in Santo Domingo. Anguilla lost to a late 1–0 goal by Emile Saimovici.
- Then, on 2 June 2021 they lost 3–0 to Dominica at Estadio Olímpico Félix Sánchez in Santo Domingo.
- On 6 July, at Estadio Nacional de Panamá in Panama City, Anguilla suffered a massive 13–0 defeat.

They ended round 1 with 0 points, 0 goals, and 23 goals against.

=== 2026 World Cup qualification ===
At the commencement of 2026 FIFA World Cup qualification, Anguilla advanced beyond the first round of qualifying for the first time in their history after beating Turks and Caicos Islands 1–1 on aggregate after penalties.

In the second round, they were drawn into Group F with Suriname, El Salvador, Puerto Rico and Saint Vincent and the Grenadines.

=== Overall World Cup qualification record ===
The pair of shutouts against Nicaragua in March 2015 extended Anguilla's scoreless run in World Cup qualification to eight matches, encompassing three World Cups over an eleven-year period. The goals Anguilla scored in March 2000 against the Bahamas in each leg of their first World Cup qualifying appearance remain their only two goals, with 41 goals conceded, no wins, one draw and nine losses from their ten World Cup qualifying matches to date.

== Results and fixtures ==
The following is a list of match results in the last 12 months, as well as any future matches that have been scheduled.

Win Draw Loss Fixture

=== 2025 ===
8 November Friendly	United Superstars (Sint Maarten)	0–5	Anguilla	Philipsburg, Sint Maarten
18:30		Report	M. Connor; Martin; Hughes; T. Connor; Gumbs	Stadium: Raoul Illidge Sports Complex

9 November Friendly	Saint Martin	1–2	Anguilla	Quartier-d'Orleans, Saint Martin
18:00		Report	Scipio; Deans	Stadium: Stade Thelbert Carti

12 November 2025–26 CONCACAF Series	Bahamas	1–2	Anguilla	George Town, Cayman Islands
16:30 UTC−5	Bayles 52' (pen.)	Report	Connor 11'; Jackson 87'	Stadium: Truman Bodden Sports Complex; Referee: Micah Erskine (Guyana)

15 November 2025–26 CONCACAF Series	Cayman Islands	4–0	Anguilla	George Town, Cayman Islands
19:00 UTC−5	Studenhofft 16' (pen.), 58'; Scott 28'; O. Ebanks 84'	Report		Stadium: Truman Bodden Sports Complex; Referee: Amaury Majors (Bermuda)

=== 2026 ===
26 March 2025–26 CONCACAF Series	Bahamas	1–3	Anguilla	George Town, Cayman Islands
16:30 UTC−5	Holcombe 15'	Report	Tesselaar 43', 52' (pen.); Guishard 83'	Stadium: Truman Bodden Sports Complex; Referee: Renlee Napoleon (Saint Lucia)

29 March 2025–26 CONCACAF Series	British Virgin Islands	4–0	Anguilla	George Town, Cayman Islands
16:30 UTC−5	T. Forbes 5', 39'; Chalwell 32' (pen.); Lacey 78'	Report		Stadium: Truman Bodden Sports Complex; Referee: Sergio Rozenhout (Suriname)

21 September Friendly	Dominica	1–0	Anguilla	Roseau, Dominica
17:00 UTC−4	Cuffy 49'	Report		Stadium: Windsor Park; Referee: Ken Pennyfeather (Antigua and Barbuda)

26 September 2026–27 CONCACAF Nations League C	Antigua and Barbuda	5–0	Anguilla	North Sound, Antigua and Barbuda
19:00 UTC−4	Douglas 1', 21'; Pereira 16'; Bishop 35'; George 43'	Report		Stadium: Sir Vivian Richards Stadium; Attendance: 3,674; Referee: Wikelson Bonnet (Haiti)

29 September 2026–27 CONCACAF Nations League C	Anguilla	0–2	Aruba	North Sound, Antigua and Barbuda
19:00 UTC−4		Report	Ostiana 53'; Figaroa 88'	Stadium: Sir Vivian Richards Stadium; Attendance: 117; Referee: Hakeem Harvey (Saint Kitts and Nevis)

1 October 2026–27 CONCACAF Nations League C	Anguilla	0-3	Antigua and Barbuda	North Sound, Antigua and Barbuda
19:00 UTC−4		Report	d'Andre Bishop 35', 64'; Sean tomlinson 74'	Stadium: Sir Vivian Richards Stadium; Referee: Pierre

4 October 2026–27 CONCACAF Nations League C	Aruba	3-2	Anguilla	North Sound, Antigua and Barbuda
19:00 UTC−4	Carlito fermina 7'; Alljereau Mercera 90+3'; Justin Peterson 90+3'	Report	Nathaniel Owen 39'; Antonio Flemming 77'	Stadium: Sir Vivian Richards Stadium; Referee: Juan Morales Guatemala

10 November Friendly	Sint Maarten	5—1	Anguilla	Philipsburg, Sint Maarten
20:00 UTC−4	Tavernier 23'; Martina 34'; Amatkarijo 68'; Bleeker 88'; Lake 93'	Report	Tesselaar 97' (pen.)	Stadium: Raoul Illidge Sports Complex

== Coaching history ==
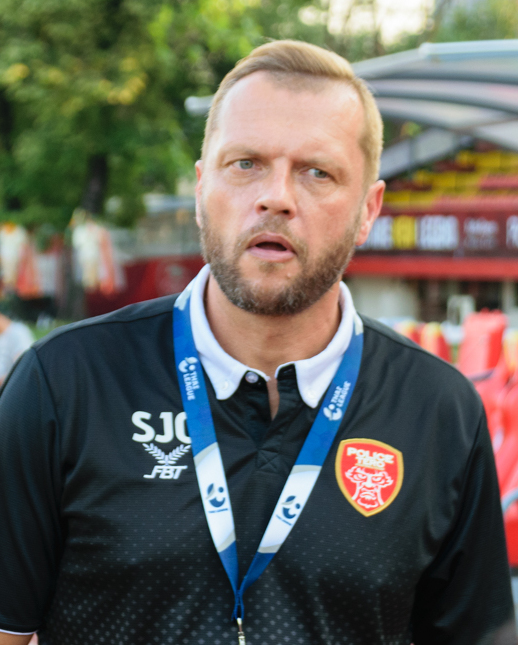
Scott Cooper managed the national football team of Anguilla in the 2000s

- (England) Les Strong (1991–1994)
- (England) Clifton Livingston (2000)
- (England) Scott Cooper (2002)
- (Anguilla) Vernon Hodge (2003–2004)
- (England) Benjamin Davies (2004)
- (Anguilla) Vernon Hodge (2004–2007)
- (England) Kerthney Carty (2008)
- (Anguilla) Colin Johnson (2008–2009)
- (England) Scott Cooper (2010)
- (Anguilla) Colin Johnson (2010–2015)
- (Poland) (United States) Richard Orlowski (2015)
- (Anguilla) Leon Jeffers (2016)
- (Anguilla) Romare Kelsick (2016–2018)
- (Anguilla) Nigel Connor (2018–2020)
- (Trinidad and Tobago) Stern John (2020–2022)
- (Anguilla) Nigel Connor (2022–2024)
- (Trinidad and Tobago) Keith Jeffrey (2024–Present)

== Players ==
=== Current squad ===
The following players were called up for the 2026 CONCACAF Series matches against Bahamas and Cayman Islands on 26 and 29 March 2026.

Caps and goals are updated as of 30 March 2026, after the match against Cayman Islands.

No.	Pos.	Player	Date of birth (age)	Caps	Goals	Club
1	GK	Jelanie Lawrence	26 August 1983 (age 43)	15	0	(Anguilla Football Association) Doc's United
	GK	Orliandry Curiel	21 June 2005 (age 21)	0	0	(Anguilla Football Association) Roaring Lions
20	DF	Kieron Lake-Bryan	23 October 2001 (age 25)	18	0	(The Football Association) Northwood
	DF	Luke Paris	11 November 1994 (age 32)	17	1	(The Football Association) Uxbridge
	DF	Alexander Fleming-Franco	12 April 2005 (age 21)	13	0	(Anguilla Football Association) Doc's United
13	DF	Nathaniel Owen	25 January 2008 (age 18)	8	0	(The Football Association) Eastleigh
15	DF	Sedu Bradshaw	13 November 2002 (age 24)	3	0	(Anguilla Football Association) Lymers
8	MF	Germain Hughes (captain)	15 November 1996 (age 29)	33	1	(Anguilla Football Association) Roaring Lions
10	MF	Aedan Scipio	3 September 1990 (age 36)	14	0	(Anguilla Football Association) Roaring Lions
6	MF	Javis Jones	24 August 2005 (age 21)	10	0	(Anguilla Football Association) Uprising
4	MF	Kayne Connor	16 May 2004 (age 22)	10	0	(The Football Association) Bedfont Sports
22	MF	Tjivari Leveret-Francisca	15 September 2009 (age 17)	8	0	(Anguilla Football Association) Roaring Lions
12	MF	Malachi Gumbs	3 June 2006 (age 20)	5	0	(Anguilla Football Association) Diamond
23	MF	Jaheim Thompson	6 October 2007 (age 19)	4	0	(The Football Association) Oldham Athletic U-18
2	MF	Yariel Fleming	10 October 1997 (age 29)	4	0	(Anguilla Football Association) Roaring Lions
	FW	Jonathan Guishard	2 July 1996 (age 30)	22	2	(Anguilla Football Association) Doc's United
19	FW	Timarqus Connor	18 August 2007 (age 19)	8	0	(Anguilla Football Association) Attackers
14	FW	Tarique Jackson	3 July 2009 (age 17)	6	1	(Anguilla Football Association) Roaring Lions
11	FW	Jayvon Lloyd	20 March 2002 (age 24)	6	0	(Anguilla Football Association) Attackers FC
	FW	Jan-Willem Tesselaar	21 October 1997 (age 29)	2	2	(Royal Dutch Football Association) AVV Swift

=== Recent call-ups ===
The following players have also been called up for the team in the last twelve months.

Pos.	Player	Date of birth (age)	Caps	Goals	Club	Latest call-up

== Player records ==
As of 22 May 2026
Players in bold are still active with Anguilla.

=== Most appearances ===
Rank	Player	Caps	Goals	Career
1	**Germain Hughes**	33	1	2012–present
2	**Kion Lee**	25	0	2012–present
2	Ryan Liddie	25	0	2000–2019
4	Girdon Connor	23	4	2000–2018
5	**Jonathan Guishard**	22	2	2014–present
6	Kevin Hawley	18	0	2000–2016
6	**Kieron Lake-Bryan**	18	0	2022–present
6	Adonijah Richardson	18	1	2006–2016
9	**Luke Paris**	17	1	2019–present
9	Leon Jeffers	17	0	2004–2012

=== Top goalscorers ===
Rank	Player	Goals	Caps	Ratio	Career
1	Richard O'Connor	5	5	1	2000–2006
2	Girdon Connor	4	23	0.17	2000–2018
3	**Lamar Carpenter**	3	11	0.27	2021–present
4	**Jan-Willem Tesselaar**	2	3	0.67	2022–Present
4	Terrence Rogers	2	13	0.15	2000–2012
4	**Jonathan Guishard**	2	22	0.09	2014–present

== Competitive record ==
=== FIFA World Cup ===
FIFA World Cup record										Qualification record					
Year	Round	Pos.	Pld	W	D	L	GF	GA	Squad	Pld	W	D	L	GF	GA
1930 to 1994	Not a FIFA member									Not a FIFA member					
(France) 1998	Did not participate									Did not participate					
(South Korea) (Japan) 2002	Did not qualify									2	0	0	2	2	5
(Germany) 2006	Did not qualify									2	0	1	1	0	6
(South Africa) 2010	Did not qualify									2	0	0	2	0	16
(Brazil) 2014	Did not qualify									2	0	0	2	0	6
(Russia) 2018	Did not qualify									2	0	0	2	0	8
(Qatar) 2022	Did not qualify									4	0	0	4	0	23
(Canada) (Mexico) (United States) 2026	Did not qualify									6	0	2	4	1	22
(Morocco) (Portugal) (Spain) 2030	To be determined									To be determined					
(Saudi Arabia) 2034	To be determined									To be determined					
Total	—	0/7	—							20	0	3	17	3	86

=== CONCACAF Gold Cup ===
CONCACAF Championship / Gold Cup record										Qualification record					
Year	Round	Pos.	Pld	W	D	L	GF	GA	Squad	Pld	W	D	L	GF	GA
1963 to 1989	Not a CONCACAF member									Not a CONCACAF member					
(United States) 1991	Did not qualify									2	0	1	1	1	7
(Mexico) (United States) 1993	Did not qualify									2	0	0	2	0	2
(United States) 1996	Did not qualify									2	0	0	2	2	6
(United States) 1998	Did not qualify									3	0	0	3	1	12
(United States) 2000	Did not qualify									3	0	0	3	1	35
(United States) 2002	Did not qualify									2	1	0	1	5	4
(Mexico) (United States) 2003	Did not participate									Did not participate					
(United States) 2005	Withdrew									Withdrew					
(United States) 2007	Did not qualify									3	0	0	3	5	18
(United States) 2009	Did not qualify									2	0	0	2	2	6
(United States) 2011	Did not qualify									3	1	0	2	4	8
(United States) 2013	Did not qualify									3	0	0	3	1	16
(Canada) (United States) 2015	Did not qualify									3	0	0	3	0	20
(United States) 2017	Did not qualify									2	0	0	2	0	11
(Costa Rica) (Jamaica) (United States) 2019	Did not qualify									4	0	1	3	1	15
(United States) 2021	Did not qualify									4	0	0	4	2	21
(Canada) (United States) 2023	Did not qualify									4	0	2	2	2	5
(Canada) (United States) 2025	Did not qualify									4	1	0	3	3	4
Total	—	0/16	—							46	3	4	39	30	192

=== CONCACAF Nations League ===
CONCACAF Nations League record
League phase											Final phase									
Season	League	Group	Pos.	Pld	W	D	L	GF	GA	P/R	Finals	Round	Pos.	Pld	W	D	L	GF	GA	Squad
2019–20	C	C	13th	4	0	0	4	2	21	Same position	(United States) 2021	Ineligible								
2022–23	C	C	9th	4	0	2	2	2	5	Same position	(United States) 2023	Ineligible								
2023–24	C	A	9th	4	0	0	4	0	19	Same position	(United States) 2024	Ineligible								
2024–25	C	B	6th	4	1	0	3	3	4	Same position	(United States) 2025	Ineligible								
2026–27	C	B	7th	4	0	0	4	2	13	Same position	2027 (Note: Since the 2026–27 CONCACAF Nations League, a final phase has been held for each league.)	Did not qualify								
Total				20	1	2	17	9	62	—	Total	—								

CONCACAF Nations League history
First match	Guatemala 10–0 Anguilla (5 September 2019; Guatemala City, Guatemala)
Biggest win	Anguilla 2–0 Turks and Caicos Islands (4 September 2024; Providenciales, Turks and Caicos Islands)
Biggest defeat	Guatemala 10–0 Anguilla (5 September 2019; Guatemala City, Guatemala)
Best result	League C (2024–25)
Worst result	League C (2019–20, 2023–24)

=== Caribbean Cup ===
CFU Championship / Caribbean Cup record									Qualification record					
Year	Round	Pos.	Pld	W	D	L	GF	GA	Pld	W	D	L	GF	GA
1978 to 1988	Not a CFU member								Not a CFU member					
1989 and 1990	Did not participate								Did not participate					
(Jamaica) 1991	Did not qualify								2	0	1	1	1	7
(Trinidad and Tobago) 1992	Did not qualify								2	0	0	2	0	8
(Jamaica) 1993	Did not qualify								2	0	0	2	0	2
(Trinidad and Tobago) 1994	Did not qualify								2	0	0	2	0	11
(Cayman Islands) (Jamaica) 1995	Did not qualify								2	0	0	2	2	6
(Trinidad and Tobago) 1996	Did not qualify								2	0	0	2	0	12
(Antigua and Barbuda) (Saint Kitts and Nevis) 1997	Did not qualify								3	0	0	3	1	12
(Jamaica) 1998	Did not qualify								3	0	0	3	1	35
(Trinidad and Tobago) 1999	Withdrew								Withdrew					
(Trinidad and Tobago) 2001	Did not qualify								2	1	0	1	5	4
(Barbados) 2005	Withdrew								Withdrew					
(Trinidad and Tobago) 2007	Did not qualify								3	0	0	3	5	18
(Jamaica) 2008	Did not qualify								2	0	0	2	2	6
(Martinique) 2010	Did not qualify								3	1	0	2	4	8
(Antigua and Barbuda) 2012	Did not qualify								3	0	0	3	1	16
(Jamaica) 2014	Did not qualify								3	0	0	3	0	20
(Martinique) 2017	Did not qualify								2	0	0	2	0	11
Total	—	0/15	—						36	2	1	33	21	176

== Head-to-head record ==
Team	Pld	W	D	L	GF	GA	GD	WPCT
Aruba	1	0	0	1	0	2	−2	0.00
Antigua and Barbuda	5	0	0	5	3	25	−22	0.00
Bahamas	5	2	1	2	6	7	−1	40.00
Barbados	2	0	0	2	1	8	−7	0.00
Belize	2	0	0	2	0	2	−2	0.00
Bonaire	2	0	0	2	0	5	−5	0.00
British Virgin Islands	14	5	2	7	15	27	−12	35.71
Cayman Islands	2	0	0	2	1	8	−7	0.00
Cuba	2	0	0	2	0	8	−8	0.00
Dominica	5	0	2	3	1	10	−9	0.00
Dominican Republic	6	0	1	5	0	28	−28	0.00
El Salvador	3	0	0	3	0	19	−19	0.00
French Guiana	2	0	0	2	1	9	−8	0.00
Gibraltar	1	0	0	1	1	4	−3	0.00
Grenada	2	0	0	2	1	16	−15	0.00
Guadeloupe	1	0	0	1	0	9	−9	0.00
Guatemala	2	0	0	2	0	15	−15	0.00
Guyana	2	0	0	2	0	21	−21	0.00
Martinique	1	0	0	1	1	3	−2	0.00
Montserrat	4	1	1	2	7	6	+1	25.00
Nicaragua	3	0	0	3	0	14	−14	0.00
Panama	1	0	0	1	0	13	−13	0.00
Puerto Rico	5	0	0	5	3	21	−18	0.00
Saint Kitts and Nevis	4	0	0	4	3	20	−17	0.00
Saint Lucia	3	0	0	3	1	10	−9	0.00
Saint Martin	13	3	1	9	13	36	−23	23.08
Sint Maarten	7	0	2	5	3	13	−10	0.00
Saint Vincent and the Grenadines	4	0	0	4	1	15	−14	0.00
Suriname	1	0	0	1	0	4	−4	0.00
Turks and Caicos Islands	4	1	2	1	4	3	+1	25.00
Trinidad and Tobago	2	0	0	2	0	25	−25	0.00
U.S. Virgin Islands	3	0	2	1	0	3	−3	0.00
Total	114	12	14	88	66	409	−343	10.53

Source: Results

== Historical kits ==
2000-10s Home	2000-10s Away	2014 Home	2014 Third	2018 Home	2018 Away	2018 Third	2021 Home

2021 Away	2021 Third
