= Saint Martin national football team results =

National football team results

The Saint Martin national football team represents the Collectivity of Saint Martin, the French half of the Caribbean island of Saint Martin, in international association football under the auspices of the Ligue de football de Saint-Martin.

The LFSM became an association member of CONCACAF in 2002 and gained full member status in 2013. In 2013, the association also became a member of the Caribbean Football Union (CFU), a regional sub-confederation of CONCACAF. Because of its political status as an overseas collectivity of France, the LFSM is not a member of FIFA and is therefore not eligible to enter World Cup qualification.

Below is a list of Saint Martin's results in official matches.

== Results ==
Key
Colour	Meaning
	Win
	Draw
	Defeat

Saint Martin's score is shown first in each case.

No.	Date	Venue	H/N/A	Opponents	Score	Competition	Saint Martin scorers	Report
1	14 June 1988	Sint Maarten	A	Sint Maarten	3–1	Friendly	Unknown	Report
2	24 March 1990	Stade Alberic Richards, Sandy Ground, Saint Martin	H	British Virgin Islands	3–0	1990 Caribbean Cup qualification	Cozier 4', Daniel 68', 73'	Report
3	26 March 1990	Ronald Webster Park, The Valley, Anguilla	A	Anguilla	4–0	1990 Caribbean Cup qualification	Alex 39', Richard 41', Cozier 48',	Report
4	30 March 1990	Stade Alberic Richards, Sandy Ground, Saint Martin	H	Cayman Islands	5–1	1990 Caribbean Cup qualification	???, Cozier 21', Berteaux, Mathew 79' (pen.), Maccow 88'	Report
5	1 April 1990	Stade Alberic Richards, Sandy Ground, Saint Martin	H	Cayman Islands	3–2	1990 Caribbean Cup qualification	Richard 38', 75', Cozier 54'	Report
6	6 May 1990	Stade Alberic Richards, Sandy Ground, Saint Martin	H	Guadeloupe	2–1	1990 Caribbean Cup	Daniel 30', Brian 68'	Report
7	20 May 1990	National Stadium, Kingston, Jamaica	A	Jamaica	0–1	1990 Caribbean Cup		Report
8	28 April 1997	Bermuda National Stadium, Devonshire Parish, Bermuda	A	Bermuda	1–2	Friendly	Unknown	Report
9	6 February 2001	Raoul Illidge Sports Complex, Philipsburg, Sint Maarten	N	Montserrat	3–1	2001 Caribbean Cup qualification	Benjamin 83', 89', 90'	Report
10	10 February 2001	Stade Jean-Louis Vanterpool, Concordia, Saint Martin	H	Anguilla	3–1	2001 Caribbean Cup qualification	Benjamin 7', Pindi 29', Hodge 65'	Report
11	4 April 2001	Bourda Cricket Ground, Georgetown, Guyana	A	Guyana	0–2	2001 Caribbean Cup qualification		Report
12	6 April 2001	Uitvlugt Community Centre Ground, Uitvlugt, Guyana	N	Cuba	0–1	2001 Caribbean Cup qualification		Report
13	8 April 2001	Bourda Cricket Ground, Georgetown, Guyana	N	Dominica	3–2	2001 Caribbean Cup qualification	Gedrey 31', Hodge 42', Flanders 78'	Report
14	25 January 2002	Antigua Recreation Ground, Saint John's, Antigua and Barbuda	N	Saint Kitts and Nevis	0–3	Friendly		Report
15	6 June 2002	Stade Alberic Richards, Sandy Ground, Saint Martin	H	Anguilla	2–1	Friendly	Unknown	Report
16	23 June 2002	Stade Alberic Richards, Sandy Ground, Saint Martin	H	Anguilla	1–0	Friendly	Unknown	Report
17	6 July 2002	Kirani James Athletic Stadium, St. George's, Grenada	A	Grenada	3–8	2003 CONCACAF Gold Cup qualification	Lynch 4', Pindi 45', Samer 90+'	Report
18	4 August 2002	Stade Alberic Richards, Sandy Ground, Saint Martin	H	Grenada	1–7	2003 CONCACAF Gold Cup qualification	Francois 88'	Report
19	24 November 2004	Independence Park, Kingston, Jamaica	A	Jamaica	0–12	2005 Caribbean Cup qualification		Report
20	26 November 2004	Jarrett Park, Montego Bay, Jamaica	N	Haiti	0–2	2005 Caribbean Cup qualification		Report
21	28 November 2004	Independence Park, Kingston, Jamaica	N	U.S. Virgin Islands	0–0	2005 Caribbean Cup qualification		Report
22	25 February 2006	Warner Park Sporting Complex, Basseterre, Saint Kitts and Nevis	A	Saint Kitts and Nevis	1–6	Friendly	Deville 14'	Report
23	20 September 2006	Stade René Serge Nabajoth, Pointe-à-Pitre, Guadeloupe	A	Guadeloupe	0–1	2007 Caribbean Cup qualification		Report
24	22 September 2006	Stade René Serge Nabajoth, Pointe-à-Pitre, Guadeloupe	N	Martinique	0–1	2007 Caribbean Cup qualification		Report
25	24 September 2006	Stade René Serge Nabajoth, Pointe-à-Pitre, Guadeloupe	N	Dominica	0–0	2007 Caribbean Cup qualification		Report
26	11 November 2007	Stade Jean-Louis Vanterpool, Concordia, Saint Martin	H	British Virgin Islands	0–1	Friendly		Report
27	27 August 2008	Truman Bodden Sports Complex, George Town, Cayman Islands	A	Cayman Islands	0–3	2008 Caribbean Cup qualification		Report
28	30 August 2008	Truman Bodden Sports Complex, George Town, Cayman Islands	N	Bermuda	0–7	2008 Caribbean Cup qualification		Report
29	31 August 2008	Truman Bodden Sports Complex, George Town, Cayman Islands	N	Antigua and Barbuda	2–3	2008 Caribbean Cup qualification	Pierre 53', 58'	Report
30	3 July 2010	Stade Alberic Richards, Sandy Ground, Saint Martin	H	Saint Barthélemy	3–0	Friendly	Unknown	Report
31	8 August 2010	Ronald Webster Park, The Valley, Anguilla	A	Anguilla	3–1	Friendly	Unknown	Report
32	19 September 2010	Stade Alberic Richards, Sandy Ground, Saint Martin	H	British Virgin Islands	3–1	Friendly	Unknown	Report
33	2 October 2010	Juan Ramón Loubriel Stadium, Bayamón, Puerto Rico	N	Cayman Islands	1–1	2010 Caribbean Cup qualification	Virgile 55'	Report
34	4 October 2010	Juan Ramón Loubriel Stadium, Bayamón, Puerto Rico	A	Puerto Rico	0–2	2010 Caribbean Cup qualification		Report
35	6 October 2010	Juan Ramón Loubriel Stadium, Bayamón, Puerto Rico	N	Anguilla	1–2	2010 Caribbean Cup qualification	Virgile 15'	Report
36	7 September 2012	Stade Sylvio Cator, Port-au-Prince, Haiti	A	Haiti	0–7	2012 Caribbean Cup qualification		Report
37	9 September 2012	Stade Sylvio Cator, Port-au-Prince, Haiti	N	Puerto Rico	0–9	2012 Caribbean Cup qualification		Report
38	11 September 2012	Stade Sylvio Cator, Port-au-Prince, Haiti	N	Bermuda	0–8	2012 Caribbean Cup qualification		Report
39	16 August 2014	A. O. Shirley Recreation Ground, Road Town, British Virgin Islands	A	British Virgin Islands	4–2	Friendly	Louis, Cocks, Samer,	Report
40	29 April 2018	Stade de Saint-Jean, Saint-Jean, Saint Barthélemy	A	Saint Barthélemy	2–3	Friendly	Unknown	Report
41	26 August 2018	Ronald Webster Park, The Valley, Anguilla	A	Anguilla	2–1	Friendly	Arrondell,	Report
42	11 September 2018	Raymond E. Guishard Technical Centre, The Valley, Anguilla	N	Guadeloupe	0–3	2019–20 CONCACAF Nations League qualifying		Report
43	14 October 2018	Raymond E. Guishard Technical Centre, The Valley, Anguilla	N	Saint Kitts and Nevis	0–10	2019–20 CONCACAF Nations League qualifying		Report
44	16 November 2018	Kirani James Athletic Stadium, St. George's, Grenada	A	Grenada	2–5	2019–20 CONCACAF Nations League qualifying	Joachim 45', Cocks 62'	Report
45	10 March 2019	Raymond E. Guishard Technical Centre, The Valley, Anguilla	A	Anguilla	1–2	Friendly	Unknown	Report
46	17 March 2019	Stade de Saint-Jean, Saint-Jean, Saint Barthélemy	A	Saint Barthélemy	3–4	Friendly	Tasso 12' (pen.), Chance 47', Arrondell 78'	Report
47	23 March 2019	Raymond E. Guishard Technical Centre, The Valley, Anguilla	N	Sint Maarten	3–4	2019–20 CONCACAF Nations League qualifying	Arrondell 11', Cocks 52', Depalus 80' (pen.)	Report
48	5 September 2019	Wildey Turf, Wildey, Barbados	A	Barbados	0–4	2019–20 CONCACAF Nations League C		Report
49	8 September 2019	Raymond E. Guishard Technical Centre, The Valley, Anguilla	N	U.S. Virgin Islands	1–2	2019–20 CONCACAF Nations League C	Dalmat 78'	Report
50	12 October 2019	Raymond E. Guishard Technical Centre, The Valley, Anguilla	N	Cayman Islands	3–0	2019–20 CONCACAF Nations League C	Bellechasse 64', 71', 75'	Report
51	15 October 2019	Truman Bodden Sports Complex, George Town, Cayman Islands	A	Cayman Islands	0–1	2019–20 CONCACAF Nations League C		Report
52	16 November 2019	Raymond E. Guishard Technical Centre, The Valley, Anguilla	N	Barbados	1–0	2019–20 CONCACAF Nations League C	Chevalier 81'	Report
53	19 November 2019	Bethlehem Soccer Stadium, Upper Bethlehem, U.S. Virgin Islands	A	U.S. Virgin Islands	2–1	2019–20 CONCACAF Nations League C	Chevalier 39', Bellechasse 49'	Report
54	13 February 2022	Stade Thelbert Carti, Quartier-d'Orleans, Saint Martin	H	Anguilla	1–2	Friendly	Cocks	Report
55	26 March 2022	Stade Thelbert Carti, Quartier-d'Orleans, Saint Martin	H	Bahamas	2–0	Friendly	Cocks 37', Bellechasse 91'	Report
56	3 June 2022	Raymond E. Guishard Technical Centre, The Valley, Anguilla	N	Aruba	0–0	2022–23 CONCACAF Nations League C		Report
57	6 June 2022	Stadion Rignaal 'Jean' Francisca, Willemstad, Curaçao	N	Aruba	0–3	2022–23 CONCACAF Nations League C		Report
58	12 June 2022	Warner Park Sporting Complex, Basseterre, Saint Kitts and Nevis	A	Saint Kitts and Nevis	1–1	2022–23 CONCACAF Nations League C	Arné 34'	Report
59	29 January 2023	Hasely Crawford Stadium, Port of Spain, Trinidad and Tobago	A	Trinidad and Tobago	0–2	Friendly		Report
60	4 March 2023	Raymond E. Guishard Technical Centre, The Valley, Anguilla	A	Anguilla	2–2	Friendly	Cordero 74', Chilin 95'	Report
61	10 March 2023	Stade Thelbert Carti, Quartier-d'Orleans, Saint Martin	H	Saint Barthélemy	3–0	Friendly	Unknown	Report
62	23 March 2023	Raymond E. Guishard Technical Centre, The Valley, Anguilla	N	Saint Kitts and Nevis	1–3	2022–23 CONCACAF Nations League C	Arné 31'	Report
63	7 September 2023	Raymond E. Guishard Technical Centre, The Valley, Anguilla	A	Anguilla	6–0	2023–24 CONCACAF Nations League C	Raga 6', 32', 38', 40', Segarel 25', Lacazette 70'	Report
64	11 September 2023	SKNFA Technical Center, Basseterre Saint Kitts and Nevis	N	Bonaire	2–1	2023–24 CONCACAF Nations League C	Raga 75', Casper 88' (o.g.)	Report
65	16 October 2023	SKNFA Technical Center, Basseterre Saint Kitts and Nevis	N	Anguilla	8–0	2023–24 CONCACAF Nations League C	Segarel 17', 32' (pen.), 39', 47', Richardson 49', Raga 65', 70', 88'	Report
66	21 November 2023	Stadion Antonio Trenidat, Rincon, Bonaire	A	Bonaire	4–0	2023–24 CONCACAF Nations League C	Gentes 3', 45+2', Lebon 13', Richardson 46'	Report
67	17 August 2024	Raymond E. Guishard Technical Centre, The Valley, Anguilla	A	Anguilla	0–0	Friendly		Report
68	6 September 2024	Kirani James Athletic Stadium, St. George's, Grenada	A	Grenada	0–2	2024–25 CONCACAF Nations League B		Report
69	9 September 2024	Kirani James Athletic Stadium, St. George's, Grenada	N	Curaçao	0–4	2024–25 CONCACAF Nations League B		Report
70	11 October 2024	Daren Sammy Cricket Ground, Gros Islet, Saint Lucia	A	Saint Lucia	1–2	2024–25 CONCACAF Nations League B	Raga 30'	Report
71	14 October 2024	Daren Sammy Cricket Ground, Gros Islet, Saint Lucia	A	Saint Lucia	4–0	2024–25 CONCACAF Nations League B	Lebon 8' (pen.), 45+2', Barakat 26', Arne 62'	Report
72	15 November 2024	Ergilio Hato Stadium, Willemstad, Curaçao	A	Curaçao	0–5	2024–25 CONCACAF Nations League B		Report
73	18 November 2024	Ergilio Hato Stadium, Willemstad, Curaçao	N	Grenada	3–0	2024–25 CONCACAF Nations League B	R. Denis 39', Lebon 87', 90+3'	Report
74	23 May 2025	Stade Thelbert Carti, Quartier-d'Orleans, Saint Martin	H	Anguilla	2–1	2025 Pelican Cup	R. Denis 30', Raga 60'	Report
75	25 May 2025	Stade Thelbert Carti, Quartier-d'Orleans, Saint Martin	H	Saint Kitts and Nevis	4–1	2025 Pelican Cup	Raga 14', Varsovie 28', Gentes 33' (pen.), Chevalier 81'	Report
76	3 October 2025	Newtown Sports Complex, Basseterre Saint Kitts and Nevis	A	Saint Kitts and Nevis	0–5	Friendly		Report
77	4 October 2025	Newtown Sports Complex, Basseterre Saint Kitts and Nevis	A	Saint Kitts and Nevis	1–2	Friendly	Clerveau 78'	Report
78	9 November 2025	Stade Thelbert Carti, Quartier-d'Orleans, Saint Martin	H	Anguilla	1–2	Friendly	Unknown	Report
79	12 November 2025	SKNFA Technical Center, Basseterre, Saint Kitts and Nevis	N	Dominica	2–1	2025–26 CONCACAF Series	Bellechasse 79', 90+1' (pen.)	Report
80	15 November 2025	SKNFA Technical Center, Basseterre, Saint Kitts and Nevis	N	Belize	0–1	2025–26 CONCACAF Series		Report
81	26 March 2026	Stadion Antonio Trenidat, Rincon, Bonaire	N	Barbados	3–1	2025–26 CONCACAF Series	Léo 56', 57', Williams 87' (o.g.)	Report
82	29 March 2026	Stadion Antonio Trenidat, Rincon, Bonaire	A	Bonaire	3–0	2025–26 CONCACAF Series	Alexandre 39', Léo 51', M. Denis 68'	Report

== All-time record ==
Key

- Pld = Matches played
- W = Matches won
- D = Matches drawn
- L = Matches lost
- GF = Goals for
- GA = Goals against
- GD = Goal differential
- Countries are listed in alphabetical order

As of match played 29 September 2026

Team	Pld	W	D	L	GF	GA	GD	WPCT
Anguilla	15	9	2	4	37	15	+22	60.00
Antigua and Barbuda	1	0	0	1	2	3	−1	0.00
Aruba	2	0	1	1	0	3	−3	0.00
Bahamas	2	2	0	0	10	0	+10	100.00
Barbados	3	2	0	1	4	5	−1	66.67
Belize	1	0	0	1	0	1	−1	0.00
Bermuda	3	0	0	3	1	17	−16	0.00
Bonaire	3	3	0	0	9	1	+8	100.00
British Virgin Islands	4	3	0	1	10	4	+6	75.00
Cayman Islands	6	3	1	2	12	8	+4	50.00
Cuba	1	0	0	1	0	1	−1	0.00
Curaçao	2	0	0	2	0	9	−9	0.00
Dominica	3	2	1	0	5	3	+2	66.67
Grenada	5	1	0	4	9	22	−13	20.00
Guadeloupe	3	1	0	2	2	5	−3	33.33
Guyana	1	0	0	1	0	2	−2	0.00
Haiti	2	0	0	2	0	9	−9	0.00
Jamaica	2	0	0	2	0	13	−13	0.00
Martinique	1	0	0	1	0	1	−1	0.00
Montserrat	1	1	0	0	3	1	+2	100.00
Puerto Rico	2	0	0	2	0	11	−11	0.00
Saint Barthélemy	4	2	0	2	11	7	+4	50.00
Saint Kitts and Nevis	8	1	1	6	9	34	−25	12.50
Saint Lucia	2	1	0	1	5	2	+3	50.00
Sint Maarten	2	1	0	1	6	5	+1	50.00
Trinidad and Tobago	1	0	0	1	0	2	−2	0.00
U.S. Virgin Islands	5	2	1	2	8	5	+3	40.00
Total	85	34	7	44	143	189	−46	40.00

Source: Results
