= List of football clubs in Saint Martin =

Following is a list of football clubs in Saint Martin, sorted geographically.

== Current teams ==
- Orléans Attackers
- ASC Saint-Louis Stars
- FC Concordia
- FC Flamingo
- FC Marigot
- Junior Stars
- United Stars

== Former teams ==
- AS Portuguese (Saint-Barthélemy)
- Beach Hotel (Saint-Barthélemy)
- Carcajou FC (Saint-Barthélemy)
- Etudiants (Saint-Barthélemy)
- FC ASCCO (Saint-Barthélemy)
- Young Stars (Saint-Barthélemy)
- Saint-Louis Stars (Saint-Martin) {Now known as ASC Saint-Louis Stars}
- Saint-Martin Mixte Stars (Saint-Martin)
- Tigers (Saint-Martin)
- Juventus de Saint-Martin (Saint-Martin) {Withdrew from the 2014/15 competition}
