= 2017 Saint-Martin Senior League =

Saint-Martin Senior League
- Season: 2017
- Champions: St. Louis Stars
- CFU Club Championship: St. Louis Stars; Junior Stars
- Matches played: 42
- Goals scored: 246 (5.86 per match)
- Longest winning run: 9: Marigot (3 Feb.–6 May)
- Longest unbeaten run: 9: Marigot (3 Feb.–6 May)
- Longest winless run: 8: Marigot B (20 Jan.–27 Apr.)
- Longest losing run: 4: Marigot B (20 Jan.–18 Feb.)
- All statistics correct as of 31 May 2017.

The 2017 Saint-Martin Senior League is the 46th season of the Saint-Martin Senior League. The season began on 20 January 2017. The competition is contested by seven teams and consists of a double round robin season followed by a 4 team play-off.

== Clubs ==
- Attackers
- Concordia
- Flamingo
- Junior Stars
- Marigot A
- Marigot B
- St. Louis Stars

== Table ==
Pos	Team	Pld	W	D	L	GF	GA	GD	Pts	Qualification or relegation
1	Marigot A	12	9	0	3	57	20	+37	39	SMFA SL Playoffs
2	St. Louis Stars	12	6	2	4	40	27	+13	32	SMFA SL Playoffs
3	Junior Stars	12	6	2	4	42	25	+17	32	SMFA SL Playoffs
4	Concordia	12	6	1	5	33	31	+2	31	SMFA SL Playoffs
5	Orléans Attackers	12	5	2	5	33	29	+4	29	
6	Flamingo	12	3	1	8	19	38	−19	22	
7	Marigot B	12	2	2	8	25	79	−54	20	

Source: SMFA
Rules for classification: 4 point wins, 2 point draws, 1 point loss. Tiebreakers: 1) Head-to-head points. 2) Head-to-head goal difference. 3) Head-to-head goals scored. 4) Goal difference. 5) Goals scored.

== Play-off ==
The semi-final first legs will be played 9 and 11 June 2017 at Stade Alberic Richards, and the second legs will be played 16 and 18 June 2017 at Stade Thelbert Carti. The final and third place match will be played 25 June 2017 at Stade Alberic Richards. The pairings for the play-off were #1 vs. #3 and #2 vs. #4, instead of the pairings used in previous seasons, #1 vs. #4 and #2 vs. #3.

Semifinals
1	Marigot A
3	Junior Stars
2	St. Louis Stars
4	Concordia

Finals
3	Junior Stars	1
2	St. Louis Stars	2
Third place
1	Marigot A
4	Concordia
