= 2019 Saint-Martin Senior League =

Saint-Martin Senior League
- Season: 2019

The 2019 Saint-Martin Senior League is the 47th season of the Saint-Martin Senior League, the main football league in the French overseas collectivity of Saint-Martin. The season began on 13 January 2019. Junior Stars won the title.

== League table ==
Note: 4 points for a win, 2 points for a draw, 1 point for a defeat.

Pos	Team	Pld	W	D	L	GF	GA	GD	Pts	Qualification or relegation
1	Junior Stars	2	1	1	0	6	4	+2	6	Caribbean Club Shield
2	Concordia	1	1	0	0	3	0	+3	4	
3	St. Louis Stars	1	1	0	0	2	0	+2	4	
4	Attackers	1	0	1	0	3	3	0	2	
5	United Stars	2	0	0	2	1	9	−8	2	
6	Marigot	1	0	0	1	0	3	−3	1	

Updated to match(es) played on 3 February 2019. Source: Saint Martin Football Association
