= Pelican Cup =

Caribbean association football tournament for men's national teams

- Founded: 2025; 0 years ago
- Region: Caribbean (CONCACAF)
- Number of teams: 3
- Current champions: Saint Martin
- Most successful team(s): Saint Martin (1 title)

The Pelican Cup is an international friendly association football competition hosted by the Ligue de football de Saint-Martin, the national association of the French Caribbean Overseas Collectivity of Saint Martin. The tournament, which the association plans to be held annually, was created with the purpose of reinvigorating young people's interest in the sport and increase participation in local clubs on the island.

== Editions ==
=== 2025 ===
The tournament was played for the first time in May 2025. Three nations participated: Anguilla, Saint Kitts and Nevis, and hosts Saint Martin. Saint Martin's first match of the tournament was also the debut of Jean-Claude Darcheville as the nation's manager. The competition was played in a round-robin format. A match would go directly to a penalty-shootout if tied at the end of regulation time. Originally, a fourth team, Corsica, was set to compete but withdrew because of a lack of funding. Saint Martin won the inaugural competition with two wins in two matches.

Pos	Team	Pld	W	D	L	GF	GA	GD	Pts	
1	Saint Martin	2	2	0	0	6	2	+4	6	Champions
2	Saint Kitts and Nevis	2	1	0	1	5	6	−1	3	
3	Anguilla	2	0	0	2	3	6	−3	0	

Source: Global Sports Archive

23 May	Saint Martin	2–1	Anguilla	Quartier-d'Orleans, Saint Martin
20:00	Rahim Denis 30'; Axel Raga 60'	Report	Tarique Jackson 65'	Stadium: Stade Thelbert Carti

24 May	Anguilla	2–4	Saint Kitts and Nevis	Quartier-d'Orleans, Saint Martin
19:00	Nicholson Millington 47'; Keante Brooks 83'	Report	Kimaree Rogers 4', 36', 72'; Caaja Burnham 10'	Stadium: Stade Thelbert Carti

25 May	Saint Martin	4–1	Saint Kitts and Nevis	Quartier-d'Orleans, Saint Martin
15:30	Axel Raga 14'; Stephan Varsovie 28'; Randy Gentes 33' (pen.); Imri Chevalier 81'	Report	Keleb Bridgewater 53'	Stadium: Stade Thelbert Carti

== Results ==
=== Results summary ===
Rank	Nation	Gold	Silver	Bronze	Total
1	Saint Martin	1	0	0	1
2	Saint Kitts and Nevis	0	1	0	1
3	Anguilla	0	0	1	1
Totals (3 entries)		1	1	1	3
