= Tarique Jackson =

Anguillan footballer

Personal information
- Full name: Tarique Jesse Kyson Jackson
- Date of birth: 3 July 2009 (age 17)
- Place of birth: The Valley, Anguilla
- Position: Forward

Team information
- Current team: Spartan FC
- Number: 15

Senior career*
Years	Team	Apps	(Gls)
2024–2026	Roaring Lions	32	(11)
2026–	Spartan FC	8	(3)

International career^{‡}
2025–	Anguilla	5	(2)
- * Club domestic league appearances and goals as of 14:58, 7 November 2025 (UTC) ‡ National team caps and goals as of 23:26, 12 November 2025 (UTC)

Tarique Jackson (born 3 July 2009) is an Anguillan association footballer who currently plays for Spartan FC of the AFA Senior Male League, and the Anguilla national team.

== Club career ==
In 2024, Jackson finished second in the AFA Senior Male League with Roaring Lions FC. That season, he was named the league's best new player under eighteen years old at the Anguilla Football Association's annual awards ceremony.

== International career ==
Jackson represented Anguilla in 2025 CONCACAF U-17 World Cup qualification. He scored against Curaçao in the team's final match of the Group Stage. Jackson made his senior international debut on 23 May 2025 at age fifteen in a 2025 Pelican Cup match against Saint Martin. He scored his first senior international goal in the eventual 1–2 defeat.

=== International goals ===
Scores and results list the Anguilla's goal tally first.

No.	Date	Venue	Opponent	Score	Result	Competition
1	23 May 2025	Stade Thelbert Carti, Quartier-d'Orleans, Saint Martin	Saint Martin	1–2	1–2	2025 Pelican Cup
2	12 November 2025	Truman Bodden Sports Complex, George Town, Cayman Islands	Bahamas	2–1	2–1	2025–26 CONCACAF Series
Last updated 12 November 2025

=== International career statistics ===
As of match played 12 November 2025.

Anguilla national team
Year	Apps	Goals
2025	5	2
Total	5	2

== Other ==
Jackson represented Anguilla at the 2023 NACAC U13-U15 Championships held in the Dominican Republic. He won the bronze medal in the under-15 boys heptathlon that year.
