= 2016 Saint-Martin Senior League =

The 2016 Saint-Martin Senior League was the 45th season of the competition. The championship was won by FC Concordia.
