= List of Air Caraïbes destinations =

This is a list of destinations that Air Caraïbes serves or has previously served with scheduled flights as of May 2024. It does not include destinations operated to solely by its interline or codeshare partners, such as its sister airline French Bee.

== List ==
Country or territory	City	Airport	Notes	Ref.
The Bahamas	San Salvador Island	San Salvador Airport	Seasonal	
Brazil	Belém	Belém/Val-de-Cans International Airport	Terminated	
Brazil	Macapá	Macapá International Airport	Terminated	
Costa Rica	San José	Juan Santamaría International Airport	Terminated	
Cuba	Havana	José Martí International Airport	Terminated	
Cuba	Santiago	Antonio Maceo Airport	Terminated	
Dominican Republic	Punta Cana	Punta Cana International Airport		
Dominican Republic	Samaná	Samaná El Catey International Airport	Seasonal	
Dominican Republic	Santo Domingo	Las Américas International Airport		
France	Paris	Orly Airport	Hub	
French Guiana	Cayenne	Cayenne – Félix Eboué Airport		
French Polynesia	Papeete	Faa'a International Airport	Terminated	
Guadeloupe	Pointe-à-Pitre	Pointe-à-Pitre International Airport	Hub	
Haiti	Port-au-Prince	Toussaint Louverture International Airport		
Martinique	Fort-de-France	Martinique Aimé Césaire International Airport	Focus city	
Mexico	Cancún	Cancún International Airport		
Panama	Panama City	Tocumen International Airport	Terminated	
Saint Barthélemy	Gustavia	Gustaf III Airport	Terminated	
Saint Lucia	Castries	George F. L. Charles Airport	Terminated	
Saint Martin	Grand Case	Grand Case-Espérance Airport		
Sint Maarten	Philipsburg	Princess Juliana International Airport		
