= Football in Sint Maarten =

The sport of association football in the territory of Sint Maarten is run by the Sint Maarten Soccer Association. The association administers the men's national football team, the women's national football team, and various national leagues, predominantly the Sint Maarten Senior League and SXM Elite Championship.

== League history ==
It is not clear when football first came to the island, though there is evidence of a club called Blitz playing Bonaire's Flamingo on 10 June 1956. By the time the association formed, in 1985, a league had been active for some years, though it is not clear when this was first formally organised (claimed as 1975/79). The league would continue, though little evidence remains, with 2002 bringing associate membership of CONCACAF.

From here the island would receive some support from the KNVB and the construction of a Cruyff Court for small scale football, but organised football would fall apart, with the KNVB losing contact in 2008 and league football ceasing by 2011. The current president of the FA, Johnny Singh, describes football at the time as a "mess." 2010 saw a visit from FIFA's Working Group on Small Nations but nothing came of it and the sport largely died out. Strangely, 2013, despite there not being any organised football on the island, would bring full membership of CONCACAF though two further years would pass before the return of the league, which would continue to this day.

A women's league has been formally considered but is yet to start as of 2022. However, despite the lack of a league structure, a women's side of Sint Maarten club Oualichi have competed twice in the 2015 and 2017 Dutch Caribbean Women's Soccer Cup. They lost all 6 matches, against other women's clubs from the Dutch Caribbean and the Bonaire women's national team. Support has been provided by the KNVB on this front, though it isn't clear what this support is.

Level	League(s)/Division(s)
1	Sint Maarten Senior League; 8 clubs

== National teams history ==
The men's national football team were regulars in the Caribbean Cup qualifiers from 1989 to 1997, even qualifying to the 1993 edition where they would draw with Puerto Rico. However, with football falling apart on the island, the national team essentially stopped in 2000, with only an unofficial small-scale match against Sint Eustatius in 2004. National football would return in 2016 for 2017 Caribbean Cup qualification and they've played fairly regularly since. Modern results have been poor, with the team firmly placed in League C of the CONCACAF Nations League, but further development is expected with KNVB support continuing. Youth football started with the 2013 CONCACAF Under-15 Championship and they've also competed in the CONCACAF Under-20 Championship qualifiers.

The women's national football team has been considerably less active than the men's, with three registered friendly matches to date. December 2019 saw them defeat Saint Barthélemy 5–3, November 2020 brought a 3–1 win over Saint-Martin club Juventus FC, and a 2–1 loss to Anguilla followed in March 2022. They are yet to play in any CONCACAF tournaments at senior or youth levels as of 2022.
