= St. Louis Stars =

St. Louis Stars may refer to:

- St. Louis Stars (baseball), a Negro league baseball team that played from c. 1906 to 1931
  - St. Louis Stars (1937), a Negro league baseball team that played in 1937 only
  - St. Louis–New Orleans Stars, known as the St. Louis Stars in 1939
- St. Louis Stars (soccer), a soccer team of the North American Soccer League
- ASC St. Louis Stars, an association football (soccer) team that plays in the Saint-Martin Senior League
