= Imri Chevalier =

Saint Martin footballer (born 2006)

Personal information
- Date of birth: 28 November 2006 (age 19)
- Height: 1.73 m (5 ft 8 in)
- Position: Midfielder

Team information
- Current team: Junior Stars

Senior career*
Years	Team	Apps	(Gls)
2024–	Junior Stars		(8)

International career^{‡}
2024–	Saint Martin	12	(1)
- * Club domestic league appearances and goals ‡ National team caps and goals as of 19:14, 6 August 2026 (UTC)

Imri Chevalier (born 28 November 2006) is a Martinois association footballer who currently plays for Junior Stars and the Saint Martin national team.

== Club career ==
As a youth in 2018, Chevalier traveled to Elbeuf, Metropolitan France and participated in a talent identification camp held by Paris Saint-Germain. As a member of Junior Stars, he won the golden boot award as top scorer of the Saint-Martin Senior League for the 2024/25 season as the club won the league title.

== International career ==
At the youth level, Chevalier represented Saint Martin in 2024 CONCACAF U-20 Championship qualifying held in Guatemala. Later that year, he was included in a Saint Martin selection of players from the domestic league for a match against the amateur selection of Mexico. Chevalier was an offensive threat in the match, striking the post with a shot in the fifth minute. Saint Martin went on to win the match 6–1.

Chevalier made his official senior international debut on 17 August 2024 in a friendly against Anguilla. He scored his first senior international goal in a 4–1 victory over Saint Kitts and Nevis in a 2025 Pelican Cup match on 25 May 2025.

=== International goals ===
Scores and results list the Saint Martin's goal tally first.

No.	Date	Venue	Opponent	Score	Result	Competition
1	25 May 2025	Stade Thelbert Carti, Quartier-d'Orleans, Saint Martin	Saint Kitts and Nevis	4–1	4–1	2025 Pelican Cup
Last updated 6 August 2026

=== International career statistics ===
As of match played 29 March 2026.

Saint Martin national team
2024	5	0
2025	5	1
2026	2	0
Total	12	1
