= Stade Jean-Louis Vanterpool =

Football stadium in Concordia, Saint Martin

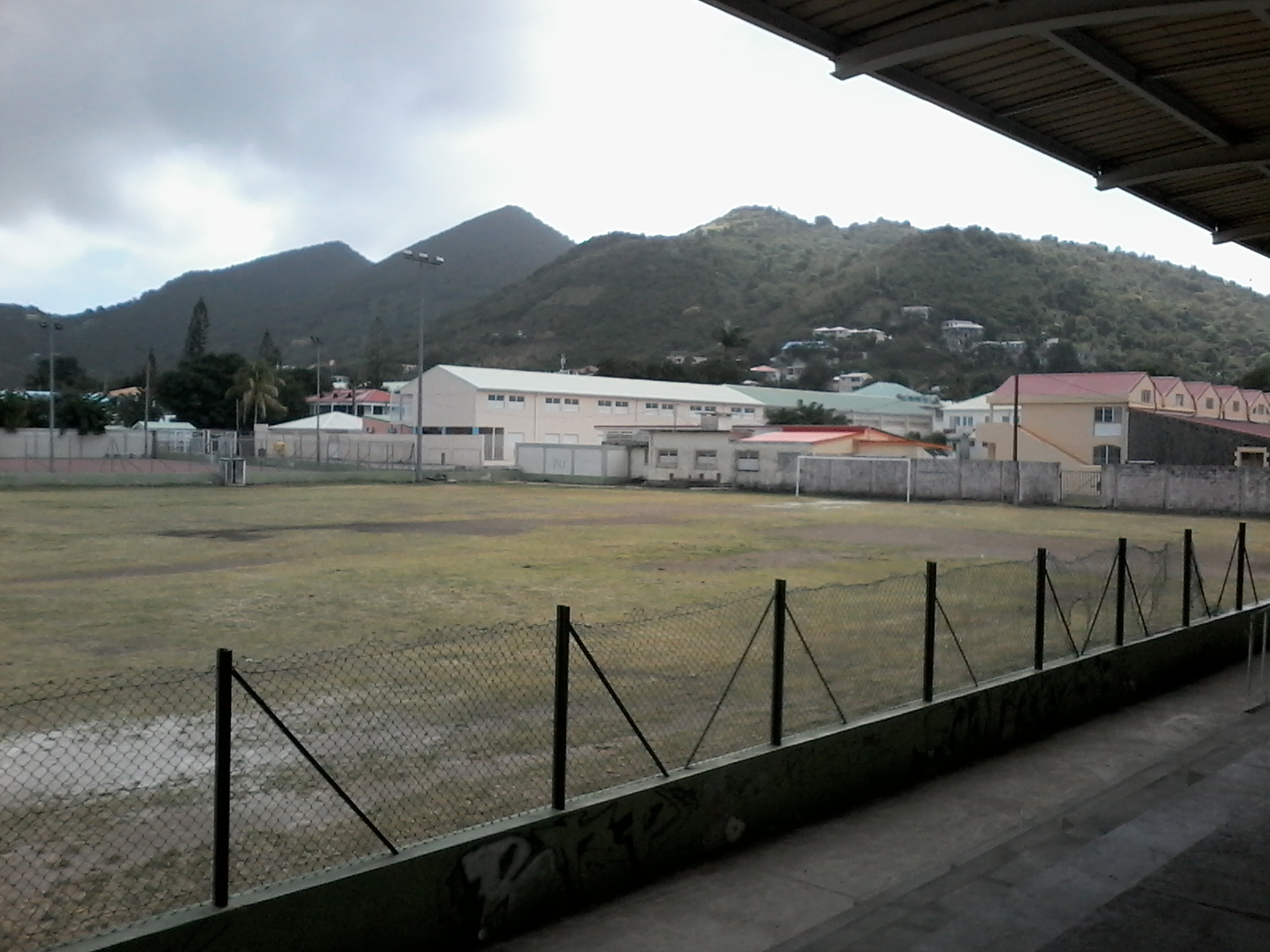
- Stadium in 2016, prior to renovation
- Interactive map of Stade Jean-Louis Vanterpool
- Location: Concordia, Saint Martin
- Coordinates: 18.0697°N 63.0817°W
- Capacity: 2,000
- Surface: artificial turf
- Field size: 90m x 60m

Construction
- Renovated: 2016–2019

The Stade Jean-Louis Vanterpool is an association football stadium in Concordia, Saint Martin. The stadium is home to Saint-Martin Senior League clubs FC Flamingo, Juventus, FC Concordia, and Junior Stars FC in addition to numerous youth football activities. The stadium has also hosted matches of the Saint Martin national football team.

The complex also includes an indoor sports hall with locker rooms and outdoor courts for basketball, volleyball, and handball. These facilities are used by local schools and sports associations.

== History ==
Already an aged venue, in June 2016, the stadium was closed for renovations with the project expected to be complete within eight months. During the renovation, the stadium and adjacent sports hall were damaged by Hurricane Irma, delaying the project's completion to August 2018. Installation of the field's lighting, the final portion of the project, was expected to be complete in late 2018 or early 2019. In total, the renovation cost €2.8 million. Further improvements were made in 2021.

By August 2023, the condition of the stadium's playing surface was a concern for event organizers. The surface was expected to be replaced the following year. Originally a compacted dirt surface, an artificial turf pitch would be laid with assistance by the French Football Federation, in addition to further upgrades to the stadium locker rooms.

== Panoramic ==
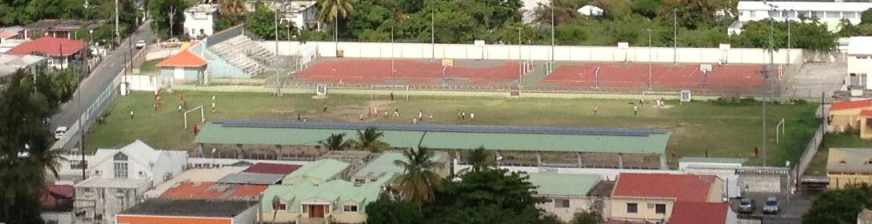
Stade Jean-Louis Vanterpool seen from Fort Louis in 2013
