= Yannick Bellechasse =

Saint-Martinois footballer (born 1992)

Personal information
- Full name: Yannick Bellechasse
- Date of birth: 26 October 1992 (age 34)
- Place of birth: Marigot, Saint Martin
- Position: Striker

Team information
- Current team: Junior Stars

Senior career*
Years	Team	Apps	(Gls)
2017–	Junior Stars		(17)
2020–2022	Flames United		
2022	Lymers	4	(3)
2022	Red Star Baie-Mahault		

International career^{‡}
2012–	Saint Martin	34	(7)
- * Club domestic league appearances and goals ‡ National team caps and goals as of 14:36, 17 November 2025 (UTC)

Yannick Bellechasse (born 26 October 1992) is a French and Saint-Martinois footballer who plays as a striker for Junior Stars and the Saint Martin national team. As part of the Saint Martin national team, he scored seven goals, including a hat-trick during the 2019–20 CONCACAF Nations League C. He's Saint Martin's most capped player so far.

== Early life ==
Yannick Bellechasse was born on 26 October 1992 in Marigot, Saint Martin, an overseas collectivity of France in the Caribbean.

== Club career ==
Bellechase made his club career in 2017 competing for the Junior Stars in the Saint-Martin Senior League. During the 2018–19 season, he became the Saint-Martin champion. He stayed with the team until the 2020–21 season, switching to Flames United that same season and won the Sint Maarten Premier League. After that, he had short stints with Lymers FC, scoring three goals for the team, and Red Star Baie-Mahault during the 2022–23 season. His goals for Lymers remain his only club goals as of May 2026. In that same season, he moved back to the Junior Stars and again became the Saint-Martin Champion.

== International career ==
Bellechasse made his football debut for the Saint Martin national football team in 2012, playing three matches for the team at the 2012 Caribbean Cup qualification against Bermuda, Haiti, and Puerto Rico. He did not make another appearance for the team until 2018 after competing in a friendly match against Anguilla.

He then competed for the team during the 2019–20 CONCACAF Nations League in League C play. During the season, he scored his first ever goals. In a 3-0 victory over the Cayman Islands, Bellechasse scored a hat trick to win their first match in the league. He then scored another goal, doing so against the United States Virgin Islands national soccer team to win the match 2-1. After the League, he did not compete for the team until 2022 in a friendly against the Bahamas national soccer team, where he scored another goal to win 2-0. His latest goal was during the group stage of the 2025–26 CONCACAF Series in Group B against Dominica. There, he scored two more goals, one being a penalty, after Troy Jules had scored for the opposing team. Saint Martin won the match 2–1.

=== International goals ===
Scores and results list Saint Martin's goal tally first.

No.	Date	Venue	Opponent	Score	Result	Competition
1	12 October 2019	Raymond E. Guishard Technical Centre, The Valley, Anguilla	Cayman Islands	1–0	3–0	2019–20 CONCACAF Nations League C
2	12 October 2019	Raymond E. Guishard Technical Centre, The Valley, Anguilla	Cayman Islands	2–0	3–0	2019–20 CONCACAF Nations League C
3	12 October 2019	Raymond E. Guishard Technical Centre, The Valley, Anguilla	Cayman Islands	3–0	3–0	2019–20 CONCACAF Nations League C
4	19 November 2019	Bethlehem Soccer Stadium, Upper Bethlehem, U.S. Virgin Islands	U.S. Virgin Islands	2–0	2–1	2019–20 CONCACAF Nations League C
5	26 March 2022	Stade Thelbert Carti, Quartier-d'Orleans, Saint Martin	Bahamas	2–0	2–0	Friendly
6	12 November 2025	SKNFA Technical Center, Basseterre, Saint Kitts and Nevis	Dominica	1–1	2–1	2025–26 CONCACAF Series
7	12 November 2025	SKNFA Technical Center, Basseterre, Saint Kitts and Nevis	Dominica	2–1	2–1	2025–26 CONCACAF Series
Last updated 17 November 2025

=== International career statistics ===
As of match played 26 March 2022

Saint Martin
Year	Apps	Goals
2012	3	0
2018	4	0
2019	7	4
2022	1	1
Total	15	5

== See also ==
- List of top international men's football goalscorers by country
