= United Stars FC =

- Full name: United Stars Football Club
- Short name: USFC
- Founded: 1991
- Ground: Grand Case Sports Complex
- Capacity: 250
- President: Galvani Bryan
- League: Saint-Martin Senior League

United Stars FC is a Martinois professional football club based in Grand Case. The club competes in the Saint-Martin Senior League, the top tier of football in Saint-Martin.

== Stadium ==
The club plays its home matches at the Grand Case Sports Complex.

== History ==
United Stars FC was founded in 1991. In January 2017, the club formed its first female side, initially attracting ten to fifteen women to its training sessions.

== Youth ==
In addition to the senior male side, the club fields various youth selections for males and females age five to seventeen. In 2018, several of the club's youth teams traveled to Saint Barthélemy along with a team representing AS Juventus de Saint-Martin. United Stars sides finished first and third in the competition. The club participated in a similar competition on St. Barths the previous season.
