= FC Marigot =

F.C. Marigot
- Full name: Football Club Marigot
- Ground: Stade Alberic Richards; Sandy Ground
- Capacity: 2,600
- President: Stephen Tackling
- Manager: Stephen Tackling
- League: Saint-Martin Senior League
- 2017: 1st

F.C. Marigot is a Martinois football club based in Marigot. The club competes in the Saint-Martin Senior League, the top tier of Martinois football.
