= 1990 Caribbean Cup =

Shell Caribbean Cup

Tournament details
- Host country: Trinidad and Tobago
- Dates: 22–29 July 1990
- Teams: 6

Tournament statistics
- Matches played: 6
- Goals scored: 16 (2.67 per match)

The 1990 Caribbean Cup, known as the Shell Caribbean Cup for sponsorship reasons, was the eighth international association football championship for members of the Caribbean Football Union (CFU). It was the second edition of the Caribbean Cup which replaced the CFU Championship. Hosted by Trinidad and Tobago, the competition was scheduled to run from 22–29 July 1990 and was contested by the national teams of Barbados, Grenada, Jamaica, Martinique, Saint Vincent and the Grenadines and Trinidad and Tobago.

The tournament was not completed. Play was suspended when the extremist Jamaat al Muslimeen Islamist group attempted a coup d'état of the government of Trinidad and Tobago on 27 July 1990. Although the coup attempt ultimately failed, the final round of games was cancelled. Trinidad and Tobago were due to meet Martinique in the final, and Jamaica and Barbados were due to contest the third place match.

== Background ==
The Caribbean Football Union (CFU) was founded in January 1978 as a sub-confederation of the Confederation of North, Central America and Caribbean Association Football (CONCACAF). Later the same year, the first CFU Championship was organised in Trinidad and Tobago. The competition was held semi-regularly until the final edition in 1988. From 1989, it was replaced by the Caribbean Cup.

The tournament was sponsored by Royal Dutch Shell following the input of employees of Shell Antilles and Gulanas Ltd.

Trinidad and Tobago were the defending champions after winning the inaugural edition in Barbados.

== Format ==
A qualifying tournament was held to determine five of the six teams that would participate in the final tournament. Hosts and holders Trinidad and Tobago qualified automatically. A preliminary round was held between six of the 21 competing teams, which Saint Martin won to advance to Zone D. The 16 remaining teams were drawn into four groups of four teams. Each group was played as a single round-robin where each team would play all of the others once. The winner of each group plus the best runner-up would qualify for the final tournament.

For the final tournament, the six teams were drawn into two groups of three teams. Each group was played as a single round-robin where each team would play all of the others once. The winners of each group would contest the final and the runners-up would contest the third-place play-off.

=== Participants ===
- Anguilla
- Antigua and Barbuda
- Aruba
- Barbados
- Bermuda
- British Virgin Islands
- Cayman Islands
- Dominica
- French Guiana
- Guadeloupe
- Grenada
- Guyana
- Jamaica
- Martinique
- Netherlands Antilles
- Saint Lucia
- Saint Martin
- Saint Kitts and Nevis
- Saint Vincent and the Grenadines
- Sint Maarten
- Suriname
- Trinidad and Tobago

== Qualifying tournament ==
=== Zone A ===
Qualifying zone A was played between 17 April and 27 May 1990. Grenada qualified as group winners after a goalless draw against Guyana in their final match.

==== Table ====
Pos	Team	Pld	W	D	L	GF	GA	GD	Pts	Qualification
1	Grenada	3	1	2	0	4	2	+2	4	Qualification for 1990 Caribbean Cup
2	Suriname	3	1	1	1	7	4	+3	3	
3	Netherlands Antilles	3	0	3	0	3	3	0	3	
4	Guyana	3	0	2	1	1	6	−5	2	

==== Results ====
17 April 1990

Grenada	1–1	Netherlands Antilles

Ergilio Hato Stadium, Willemstad
29 April 1990

Suriname	5–0	Guyana
Godlieb 44'; Borgia 63', 70' (pen.); Rigters 75'; Peel 90'

André Kamperveen Stadion, Paramaribo

15 May 1990

Grenada	3–1	Suriname
Fletcher 42', 60', 80'		Godlieb 64' (pen.)

Queen's Park, St. George's
20 May 1990

Guyana	1–1	Netherlands Antilles
Phillips 86'		Finies 51'

Bourda, Georgetown

27 May 1990

Netherlands Antilles	1–1	Suriname

Ergilio Hato Stadium, Willemstad
27 May 1990

Guyana	0–0	Grenada

Bourda, Georgetown

=== Zone B ===
Qualifying zone B was played between 22 April and 30 May 1990. Saint Vincent and the Grenadines qualified as group winners after a 2–2 draw against French Guiana in their final match. Martinique qualified as the best runner-up.

Pos	Team	Pld	W	D	L	GF	GA	GD	Pts	Qualification
1	Saint Vincent and the Grenadines	3	2	1	0	5	3	+2	5	Qualification for 1990 Caribbean Cup
2	Martinique (Note: Martinique defeated the Dominica but the exact score is unknown. No goals from the match have been included in the table.)	3	2	0	1	4	1	+3	4	Qualification for 1990 Caribbean Cup
3	French Guiana	3	0	2	1	3	7	−4	2	
4	Dominica	3	0	1	2	2	3	−1	1	

Notes:
22 April 1990

Martinique	4–0	French Guiana

Stade d'Honneur de Dillon, Fort-de-France
22 April 1990

Saint Vincent and the Grenadines	2–1	Dominica

Arnos Vale Stadium, Arnos Vale

13 May 1990

Dominica	1–1	French Guiana

Windsor Park, Roseau
13 May 1990

Saint Vincent and the Grenadines	1–0	Martinique

Arnos Vale Stadium, Arnos Vale

23 May 1990

French Guiana	2–2	Saint Vincent and the Grenadines

Stade de Baduel, Cayenne
30 May 1990

Martinique	+:–	Dominica

Stade d'Honneur de Dillon, Fort-de-France

Martinique defeated Dominica but the score is unknown.

=== Zone C ===
Qualifying zone C was played between 14 April and 27 May 1990. Barbados qualified as group winners after a 1–1 draw against Bermuda in their final match.

==== Table ====
Pos	Team	Pld	W	D	L	GF	GA	GD	Pts	Qualification
1	Barbados	3	2	1	0	3	1	+2	5	Qualification for 1990 Caribbean Cup
2	Bermuda	3	1	2	0	5	3	+2	4	
3	Saint Lucia	3	1	0	2	2	3	−1	2	
4	Antigua and Barbuda	3	0	1	2	2	5	−3	1	

==== Results ====
14 April 1990

Bermuda	2–2	Antigua and Barbuda
Ming 6'; Hill 77'		Greenaway 8'; Gonsalves 47'

Bermuda National Stadium, Hamilton
15 April 1990

Barbados	1–0	Saint Lucia
Charlery 47' (o.g.)

Barbados National Stadium, Bridgetown

29 April 1990

Barbados	1–0	Antigua and Barbuda
Hall 54'

Barbados National Stadium, Bridgetown
13 May 1990

Saint Lucia	0–2	Bermuda
		Goater 50', 79'

Mindoo Phillip Park, Castries

26 May 1990

Bermuda	1–1	Barbados
Goater 59'		O'Neale

Bermuda National Stadium, Hamilton
27 May 1990

Antigua and Barbuda	0–2	Saint Lucia
		Jean 22', 51'

Antigua Recreation Ground, St. John's

=== Zone D ===
==== Preliminary round ====
The preliminary round was played between 24 March and 1 April 1990. Six teams were split into two groups of three. Each group was played as a single round-robin where each team would play all of the others once. The winners of each group would compete for a spot in the final group stage of Zone D.

===== Group A =====
In Group A, the Cayman Islands drew Sint Maarten 1–1 and beat Aruba 2–1 before Sint Maarten drew Aruba 2–2 to help the Cayman Islands top the group.

Pos	Team	Pld	W	D	L	GF	GA	GD	Pts	Qualification
1	Cayman Islands	2	1	1	0	3	2	+1	3	Advance to final
2	Sint Maarten	2	0	2	0	3	3	0	2	
3	Aruba	2	0	1	1	3	4	−1	1	

24 March 1990

Sint Maarten	1–1	Cayman Islands
Monwastine 62'	Report	Haylock 59'

Stade Alberic Richards, Sandy Ground

26 March 1990

Cayman Islands	2–1	Aruba
L. Ramoon (x2)	Report	Vanegas 37'

Ronald Webster Park, The Valley

28 March 1990

Aruba	2–2	Sint Maarten
	Report

Stade Alberic Richards, Sandy Ground

===== Group B =====
In Group B, Saint Martin won all two of their games, beating the British Virgin Islands 3–0 and Anguilla 4–0 to top their group.

Pos	Team	Pld	W	D	L	GF	GA	GD	Pts	Qualification
1	Saint Martin	2	2	0	0	7	0	+7	4	Advance to final
2	British Virgin Islands	2	1	0	1	6	3	+3	2	
3	Anguilla	2	0	0	2	0	10	−10	0	

24 March 1990

Saint Martin	3–0	British Virgin Islands
Cozier 4'; Roybeplaine 65', 70'	Report

Stade Alberic Richards, Sandy Ground

26 March 1990

Anguilla	0–4	Saint Martin
	Report	Alex 39'; Richard 41'; Cozier 48'

Ronald Webster Park, The Valley

28 March 1990

British Virgin Islands	6–0	Anguilla
	Report

Stade Alberic Richards, Sandy Ground

===== Final =====
Both legs of the final was played at Sandy Ground, Saint Martin. Saint Martin won the first leg 5–1 and the second leg 3–2, advancing to the final group stage with an 8–3 aggregate win.

30 March 1990

Saint Martin	5–1	Cayman Islands
Cozier 21'; Berteaux; Mathew 79' (pen.); Maccow 88'	Report	L. Ramoon

Stade Alberic Richards, Sandy Ground
1 April 1990

Cayman Islands	2–3	Saint Martin
A. Ramoon 28'; L. Ramoon 89'	Report	Richard 38', 75'; Cozier 54'

Stade Alberic Richards, Sandy Ground

==== Final group stage ====
The final group stage was played between 29 April and 3 June 1990. Jamaica qualified as group winners after a goalless draw against Guadeloupe in their final match.

===== Table =====
Pos	Team	Pld	W	D	L	GF	GA	GD	Pts	Qualification
1	Jamaica	3	2	1	0	4	0	+4	5	Qualification for 1990 Caribbean Cup
2	Saint Kitts and Nevis	2	1	0	1	3	3	0	2	
3	Saint Martin	2	1	0	1	2	3	−1	2	
4	Guadeloupe	3	0	1	2	1	4	−3	1	

===== Results =====
29 April 1990

Jamaica	3–0	Saint Kitts and Nevis
Stephenson 44', 74'; Reid 62'

National Stadium, Kingston
6 May 1990

Saint Martin	2–1	Guadeloupe
Daniel 30'; Brian 68'		Clarion 65'

Stade Alberic Richards, Sandy Ground

19 May 1990

Saint Kitts and Nevis	2–0	Guadeloupe
Trotman 22'; Isaac 64'

Warner Park, Basseterre
20 May 1990

Jamaica	1–0	Saint Martin
Maxwell 30'

National Stadium, Kingston

30 May 1990

Guadeloupe	0–0	Jamaica

Stade Pierre Antonius, Pointe-à-Pitre
3 June 1990

Saint Kitts and Nevis	1–0	Saint Martin

Warner Park, Basseterre

=== Ranking of second-placed teams ===
Grp	Team	Pld	W	D	L	GF	GA	GD	Pts	Qualification
B	Martinique	3	2	0	1	4	1	+3	4	Qualification for 1990 Caribbean Cup
C	Bermuda	3	2	0	1	5	3	+2	4	
D	Saint Kitts and Nevis	3	2	0	1	3	3	0	4	
A	Suriname	3	1	1	1	7	4	+3	3	

== Final tournament ==
=== Group stage ===
==== Group A ====
In group A, Trinidad and Tobago advanced to the final after a goalless draw with Jamaica in their final match secure them first place in the group. Jamaica advanced to the third-place play-off.

===== Table =====
Pos	Team	Pld	W	D	L	GF	GA	GD	Pts	Qualification
1	Trinidad and Tobago	2	1	1	0	5	0	+5	3	Advance to final
2	Jamaica	2	0	2	0	0	0	0	2	Advance to third-place play-off
3	Grenada	2	0	1	1	0	5	−5	1	

===== Results =====
22 July 1990

Trinidad and Tobago	5–0	Grenada
Alfred 3', 50'; Elliot-Allen 12'; Joseph (x2)

National Stadium, Port of Spain

25 July 1990

Grenada	0–0	Jamaica

National Stadium, Port of Spain

27 July 1990

Trinidad and Tobago	0–0	Jamaica

National Stadium, Port of Spain

==== Group B ====
In group B, Martinique drew Barbados in their first game 2–2 before beating Saint Vincent and the Grenadines 2–0 to advance to the final. Barbados advances to the third-place play off after only managing to beat Saint Vincent and the Grenadines 3–2.

===== Table =====
Pos	Team	Pld	W	D	L	GF	GA	GD	Pts	Qualification
1	Martinique	2	1	1	0	4	2	+2	3	Advance to final
2	Barbados	2	1	1	0	5	4	+1	3	Advance to third-place play-off
3	Saint Vincent and the Grenadines	2	0	0	2	2	5	−3	0	

===== Results =====
22 July 1990

Barbados	2–2	Martinique
O'Neale 13'; Shepherd 51'		Chlorus 39'; Largen 48'

National Stadium, Port of Spain

25 July 1990

Martinique	2–0	Saint Vincent and the Grenadines
Bellemere 67'; Jean-Louis 89'

National Stadium, Port of Spain

27 July 1990

Barbados	3–2	Saint Vincent and the Grenadines

National Stadium, Port of Spain

=== Final stages ===
As the last group stage matches were being played on 27 July 1990, the extremist Jamaat al Muslimeen Islamist group began an attempted a coup d'état of the government of Trinidad and Tobago. Although the coup attempt ultimately failed, the tournament was abandoned and the final and third-place play-off were never played.

==== Third-place play-off ====
29 July 1990

Barbados	Cancelled	Jamaica

==== Final ====
29 July 1990

Trinidad and Tobago	Cancelled	Martinique
