= Axel Raga =

Footballer (born 1997)

Personal information
- Full name: Axel Raga Rigobert
- Date of birth: 27 July 1997 (age 29)
- Place of birth: Pierre-Bénite, France
- Height: 1.85 m (6 ft 1 in)
- Position: Striker

Team information
- Current team: Saint-Pierroise

Youth career
- 2006–2010: Lyon
- 2010–2014: Caluire SC
- 2014–2015: Lyon La Duchère
- 2015–2016: Le Mans

Senior career*
Years	Team	Apps	(Gls)
2016	Le Mans	1	(0)
2017	GOAL FC B	6	(3)
2017–2019	Lyon La Duchère	1	(0)
2017–2019	Lyon La Duchère B	25	(22)
2019	GOAL FC	1	(0)
2020	Ain Sud	7	(0)
2020–2022	Velay	17	(5)
2022–2023	Vaulx-en-Velin	26	(11)
2023–2025	Rumilly-Vallières	37	(17)
2025–2026	Saint-Priest	25	(5)
2026–	Saint-Pierroise	0	(0)

International career^{‡}
2023–	Saint Martin	18	(18)
- * Club domestic league appearances and goals as of 23 September 2026 ‡ National team caps and goals as of 18 November 2026

Axel Raga Rigobert (born 27 July 1997) is a footballer who plays as a striker for Réunion Premier League club Saint-Pierroise. Born in metropolitan France, he plays for the Saint Martin national team.

== Club career ==
Raga started his youth career with Lyon. In May 2020, Raga joined Velay. On 16 August 2023, Rumilly-Vallières announced the signing of Raga. He left the club in 4 June 2025, after having scored 17 goals in 40 matches.

On 2 July 2025, Raga joined Saint-Priest for the 2025–26 season. In 2026, he joined Saint-Pierroise.

== International career ==
Born in metropolitan France, Raga is of Saint-Martinois descent. On 8 September 2023, he made his debut for the Saint Martin national team by scoring four goals in a 6–0 CONCACAF Nations League win against Anguilla.

== Career statistics ==
=== International ===
As of match played 17 November 2026

Appearances and goals by national team and year
National team	Year	Apps	Goals
Saint Martin	2023	4	8
Saint Martin	2024	6	1
Saint Martin	2025	2	2
Saint Martin	2026	6	7
Total		18	18

Scores and results list Saint Martin's goal tally first, score column indicates score after each Raga goal.

List of international goals scored by Axel Raga
No.	Date	Venue	Opponent	Score	Result	Competition
1	8 September 2023	Raymond E. Guishard Technical Centre, The Valley, Anguilla	Anguilla	1–0	6–0	2023–24 CONCACAF Nations League C
2	8 September 2023	Raymond E. Guishard Technical Centre, The Valley, Anguilla	Anguilla	3–0	6–0	2023–24 CONCACAF Nations League C
3	8 September 2023	Raymond E. Guishard Technical Centre, The Valley, Anguilla	Anguilla	4–0	6–0	2023–24 CONCACAF Nations League C
4	8 September 2023	Raymond E. Guishard Technical Centre, The Valley, Anguilla	Anguilla	5–0	6–0	2023–24 CONCACAF Nations League C
5	11 September 2023	SKNFA Technical Center, Basseterre, Saint Kitts and Nevis	Bonaire	1–1	2–1	2023–24 CONCACAF Nations League C
6	16 October 2023	SKNFA Technical Center, Basseterre, Saint Kitts and Nevis	Anguilla	6–0	8–0	2023–24 CONCACAF Nations League C
7	16 October 2023	SKNFA Technical Center, Basseterre, Saint Kitts and Nevis	Anguilla	7–0	8–0	2023–24 CONCACAF Nations League C
8	16 October 2023	SKNFA Technical Center, Basseterre, Saint Kitts and Nevis	Anguilla	8–0	8–0	2023–24 CONCACAF Nations League C
9	11 October 2024	Daren Sammy Cricket Ground, Gros Islet, Saint Lucia	Saint Lucia	1–0	1–2	2024–25 CONCACAF Nations League B
10	23 May 2025	Stade Thelbert Carti, Quartier-d'Orleans, Saint Martin	Anguilla	2–0	2–1	2025 Pelican Cup
11	25 May 2025	Stade Thelbert Carti, Quartier-d'Orleans, Saint Martin	Saint Kitts and Nevis	1–0	4–1	2025 Pelican Cup
12	23 September 2026	Bethlehem Soccer Stadium, Upper Bethlehem, U.S. Virgin Islands	Bahamas	1–0	8–0	2026–27 CONCACAF Nations League C
13	23 September 2026	Bethlehem Soccer Stadium, Upper Bethlehem, U.S. Virgin Islands	Bahamas	6–0	8–0	2026–27 CONCACAF Nations League C
14	23 September 2026	Bethlehem Soccer Stadium, Upper Bethlehem, U.S. Virgin Islands	Bahamas	7–0	8–0	2026–27 CONCACAF Nations League C
15	2 October 2026	Bethlehem Soccer Stadium, Upper Bethlehem, U.S. Virgin Islands	U.S. Virgin Islands	1–0	5–0	2026–27 CONCACAF Nations League C
16	6 October 2026	Bethlehem Soccer Stadium, Upper Bethlehem, U.S. Virgin Islands	Bahamas	1–0	6–0	2026–27 CONCACAF Nations League C
17	6 October 2026	Bethlehem Soccer Stadium, Upper Bethlehem, U.S. Virgin Islands	Bahamas	5–0	6–0	2026–27 CONCACAF Nations League C
18	6 October 2026	Bethlehem Soccer Stadium, Upper Bethlehem, U.S. Virgin Islands	Bahamas	6–0	6–0	2026–27 CONCACAF Nations League C

== Honours ==
Individual

- CONCACAF Nations League top goalscorer: 2023–24
