= FC Flamingo =

- Full name: Football Club Flamingo
- Founded: 1995
- Ground: Stade Jean-Louis Vanterpool
- Capacity: 2000
- President: Jean-Claude Sinius
- League: Saint-Martin Senior League
- 2020–21: 6th

FC Flamingo is a Martinois professional football club based in Quartier-d'Orleans. The club competes in the Saint-Martin Senior League, the top tier of football in Saint-Martin.

== Stadium ==
The club plays its home matches at the Stade Jean-Louis Vanterpool.

== History ==
FC Flamingo was founded in 1995. The association was established in 2001. In 2024, the club was given the Encouragement Award by the Ligue de football de Saint-Martin at the association's annual Pelican Awards Gala.

== Youth ==
The club fields youth sides of various age groups. These youth selections have won various competitions in the territory.

== Women ==
FC Flamingo also fields women's sides, including at the senior level. IN 2023, the club was Saint Martin's participant in the first-ever women's YVV Cup. They advanced to the semi-final that year, but were eliminated by Martinique's RC Rivière-Pilote.
