= Akim Arrondell =

Saint-Martinois footballer

Personal information
- Date of birth: 3 November 1999 (age 27)
- Place of birth: Marigot, Saint Martin
- Positions: Midfielder; striker

Team information
- Current team: Soualiga

Senior career*
Years	Team	Apps	(Gls)
2013–2019	Junior Stars		
2019–	Soualiga		

International career^{‡}
2018	Saint Martin U20	6	(5)
2018–	Saint Martin	6	(3)
- * Club domestic league appearances and goals as of 13:50, 14 February 2022 (UTC) ‡ National team caps and goals as of 13:50, 14 February 2022 (UTC)

Akim Arrondell (born 3 November 1999) is a Saint-Martinois footballer who currently plays for FC Soualiga of the Sint Maarten Senior League, and the Saint Martin national team.

== Club career ==
Arrondell was a member of Junior Stars FC beginning in at least 2013. Following the 2013–2014 season he was one of three nominees for Saint Martin's Footballer-of-the-Year Award. In 2019 he moved to FC Soualiga of the Senior League on the Dutch side of the island.

== International career ==
Arrondell was part of Saint Martin's roster that competed at the 2013 CONCACAF Under-15 Championship. He made his senior international debut on 26 August 2018 in a friendly against Anguilla. He went on to score his first two senior international goals in the eventual 2–1 victory. Later that year he made five appearances for Saint Martin during the 2018 CONCACAF U-20 Championship, scoring one goal in the team's opening 1–1 draw with Aruba. He scored four goals against Sint Maarten in his country's final training match before the tournament. Prior to 2019–20 CONCACAF Nations League qualification Saint Martin played an unofficial friendly against Saint Barthélemy. Arrondell scored his team's final goal of the 3–4 defeat. He went on to score in the Nations League qualifying campaign against Sint Maarten.

=== International goals ===
Scores and results list Saint Martin's goal tally first.

#	Date	Venue	Opponent	Score	Result	Competition
1.	26 August 2018	Raymond E. Guishard Technical Centre, The Valley, Anguilla	Anguilla	1–0	2–1	Friendly
2.	26 August 2018	Raymond E. Guishard Technical Centre, The Valley, Anguilla	Anguilla	2–0	2–1	Friendly
3.	23 March 2019	Raymond E. Guishard Technical Centre, The Valley, Anguilla	Sint Maarten	1–1	3–4	2019–20 CONCACAF Nations League qualification
Last updated 14 February 2022

=== International career statistics ===
As of match played 8 September 2019.

Saint Martin national team
Year	Apps	Goals
2018	3	2
2019	3	1
Total	6	2
