= Nicholson Millington =

Anguillan footballer (born 2008)

Personal information
- Full name: Nicholson Johnn Essien Millington
- Date of birth: 3 August 2008 (age 18)
- Place of birth: Cauls Bottom, Anguilla
- Height: 1.72 m (5 ft 8 in)
- Positions: Midfielder; defender

Senior career*
Years	Team	Apps	(Gls)
2023–	Diamond FC	61	(3)

International career^{‡}
2022	Anguilla U14		(1)
2023	Anguilla U15		(2)
2024–	Anguilla U20	4	(0)
2024–	Anguilla	4	(1)
2025	Anguilla U17	4	(0)
- * Club domestic league appearances and goals as of 3 August 2026 ‡ National team caps and goals as of 3 August 2026

Nicholson Johnn Essien Millington (born 3 August 2008) is an Anguillan footballer who plays as a midfielder and defender for AFA Senior Male League side Diamond FC and the Anguilla national team.

== Club career ==
Millington made his debut for Diamond FC in 2022, aged 14, playing one match in that year's AFA President's Cup. He made his AFA Senior Male League debut in 2023, before going on to play 13 league matches that season.

== International career ==
In 2023, Millington helped Anguilla's under-15 national team win a regional tournament against both the British Virgin Islands and US Virgin Islands, finishing as the tournament's joint-top goal scorer with two goals, and winning the Golden Boot as Anguilla won. In February 2024, he made four appearances for the Anguilla under-20 national team during 2024 CONCACAF U-20 Championship qualifying. In 2025, Millington made four appearances for the Anguilla under-17 national team during 2025 CONCACAF U-17 World Cup qualification.

Millington made his debut for the Anguilla senior national team on 11 June 2024, in an 8–0 defeat to Puerto Rico during the second round of 2026 FIFA World Cup qualification. His next match for Anguilla was a 1–0 defeat to Belize, where he came on as a substitute for Alexander Fleming. He scored his first international goal in a 4–2 defeat to Saint Kitts & Nevis during the Pelican Cup in May 2025.
