= 2022 Caribbean Club Shield =

2022 CONCACAF Caribbean Club Shield
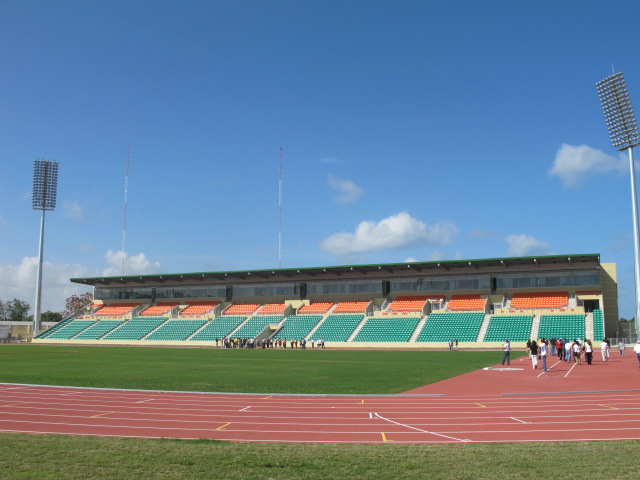
- The Estadio Centroamericano de Mayagüez in Mayagüez hosted the final.

Tournament details
- Host country: Puerto Rico
- City: Mayagüez
- Dates: 15–24 April 2022
- Teams: 10 (from 10 associations)

Final positions
- Champions: (Puerto Rico) Bayamon FC (1st title)
- Runners-up: (Suriname) Inter Moengotapoe
- Third place: (Guadeloupe) AS Gosier
- Fourth place: (Curaçao) Jong Holland

Tournament statistics
- Matches played: 16
- Goals scored: 64 (4 per match)
- Top scorer(s): (Martinique) Kévin Parsemain (8 goals)

The 2022 Caribbean Club Shield was the fifth edition of the Caribbean Club Shield (also known as the CFU Club Shield), the second-tier annual international club football competition in the Caribbean region, held amongst clubs whose football associations are affiliated with the Caribbean Football Union (CFU), a sub-confederation of CONCACAF.

The winners of the 2022 CONCACAF Caribbean Club Shield, as long as they fulfill the CONCACAF Regional Club Licensing criteria, play against the fourth place team of the 2022 CONCACAF Caribbean Club Championship in a playoff match to determine the final Caribbean spot to the 2022 CONCACAF League.

Robinhood, having won the title in 2019, were the title holders, since the 2020 and 2021 editions were cancelled due to the COVID-19 pandemic and the titles were not awarded.

In the final, Bayamon FC defeated Inter Moengotapoe, 2–1, after extra-time with a game-winning goal scored by Jordi Ranera in the 121st minute, to win their first title.

== Teams ==
Among the 31 CFU member associations, 27 of them were classified as non-professional leagues and each may enter one team in the CONCACAF Caribbean Club Shield.

Association	Team	Qualification method	App. (last)	Previous best (last)
Aruba	Deportivo Nacional	2021 Aruban Division di Honor champions	2nd (2018)	Fourth place (2018)
Bonaire	SV Real Rincon	2021 Bonaire League champions	5th (2021)	Third place (2018)
Curaçao	Jong Holland	2021 Curaçao Promé Divishon champions	2nd (2019)	Third place (2019)
Dominica	South East FC	2020 Dominica Premier League champions	3rd (2021)	Group stage (2021)
Guadeloupe	Gosier	2020–21 Guadeloupe Division of Honor champions	2nd (2021)	Group stage (2021)
Martinique	Golden Lion FC	2020–21 Martinique Championnat National champions	1st	Debut
Puerto Rico (hosts)	Bayamon FC	2021 Liga Puerto Rico champions	1st	Debut
Saint Martin	Junior Stars FC	2021 Saint-Martin Senior League champions	1st	Debut
Suriname	Inter Moengotapoe	2021 SVB Topklasse champions	4th (2021)	Runners-up (2018)
Turks and Caicos Islands	SWA Sharks FC	2021 Provo Premier League champions	1st	Debut

Withdrawn teams
Association	Team	Qualification method	App. (last)	Previous best (last)
Bermuda	North Village Rams	2020–21 Bermudian Premier Division champions	1st	Debut
Sint Maarten	Flames United SC	2021 Sint Maarten Senior League champions	2nd (2021)	Group stage (2021)
Cayman Islands	Scholars International	2020–21 Cayman Islands Premier League champions	3rd (2020)	Consolation matches (2019)
Saint Lucia	Platinum FC	2021 SLFA First Division champions	4th (2021)	Consolation matches (2019)

Associations which did not enter a team

- Anguilla
- Antigua and Barbuda
- Bahamas
- Barbados
- British Virgin Islands
- Cuba
- French Guiana
- Grenada
- Guyana
- Montserrat
- Saint Kitts and Nevis
- Saint Vincent and the Grenadines
- U.S. Virgin Islands

Notes

1. Bermuda (BER): The 2020–21 Bermudian Premier Division was abandoned by the Bermuda Football Association due to the COVID-19 pandemic in Bermuda. The season was declared null and void, and no champions were declared.

== Group stage ==
The draw for the group stage was held on 3 February 2022, 11:00 EST (UTC−5), at the CONCACAF Headquarters in Miami, United States. The 13 teams were drawn into four groups: one group of four teams and three groups of three teams. The team from the host association Puerto Rico, Bayamon FC, were allocated to position A1, while the remaining 12 teams were drawn into the other group positions without any seeding.

The winners of each group advance to the semi-finals.

All times local, AST (UTC−4).

=== Group A ===
Pos	Team	Pld	W	D	L	GF	GA	GD	Pts	Qualification
1	(Puerto Rico) Bayamon FC (H)	2	1	1	0	9	3	+6	4	Knockout stage
2	(Collectivity of Saint Martin) Junior Stars FC	2	0	2	0	4	4	0	2	
3	(Dominica) South East FC	2	0	1	1	1	7	−6	1	

Source: CONCACAF
(H) Hosts
15 April 2022
20:00

Bayamon FC (Puerto Rico)	3–3	(Collectivity of Saint Martin) Junior Stars FC
Ortega 17'; López 27', 65'		Martínez 9'; Cordero 24'; Adams 29'

Juan Ramón Loubriel Stadium, Bayamón
Referee: Odette Hamilton (Jamaica)

17 April 2022
20:00

Bayamon FC (Puerto Rico)	6–0	(Dominica) South East FC
Hernández 31' 49'; Rosario 44'; Ranera 47', 78'; López 71'

Juan Ramón Loubriel Stadium, Bayamón
Referee: Randy Encarnación (Dominican Republic)

19 April 2022
17:30

South East FC (Dominica)	1–1	(Collectivity of Saint Martin) Junior Stars FC
Mauvais 46' (o.g.)		Bellechasse 24'

Juan Ramón Loubriel Stadium, Bayamón
Referee: Ricangel de Leca (Aruba)

=== Group B ===
Pos	Team	Pld	W	D	L	GF	GA	GD	Pts	Qualification
1	(Curaçao) Jong Holland	3	2	1	0	6	0	+6	7	Knockout stage
2	(Guadeloupe) Gosier	3	2	1	0	3	1	+2	7	Knockout stage
3	(Turks and Caicos Islands) SWA Sharks FC	3	1	0	2	3	3	0	3	
4	(Bonaire) SV Real Rincon	3	0	0	3	2	10	−8	0	

Source: CONCACAF

15 April 2022
17:30

SV Real Rincon (Bonaire)	1–2	(Guadeloupe) Gosier
Hughan 28'		Popote 58' (pen.); Serin 76'

Estadio Centroamericano de Mayagüez, Mayagüez
Referee: Jose Torres (Puerto Rico)
15 April 2022
20:00

SWA Sharks FC (Turks and Caicos Islands)	0–1	(Curaçao) Jong Holland
		Roosje 50'

Estadio Centroamericano de Mayagüez, Mayagüez
Referee: Fabrizio Stasolla (Canada)

17 April 2022
15:00

SWA Sharks FC (Turks and Caicos Islands)	0–1	(Guadeloupe) Gosier
		Serin 40'

Estadio Centroamericano de Mayagüez, Mayagüez
Referee: Reginald Gumbs (Saint Kitts and Nevis)
17 April 2022
20:00

SV Real Rincon (Bonaire)	0–5	(Curaçao) Jong Holland
		D. Rosa 41'; Roosje 59'; Anastatia 66'; Clarissa 81'; Baptiste 89'

Estadio Centroamericano de Mayagüez, Mayagüez
Attendance: 0
Referee: Katja Koroleva (United States)

19 April 2022
15:00

Jong Holland (Curaçao)	0–0	(Guadeloupe) Gosier

Estadio Centroamericano de Mayagüez, Mayagüez
Referee: Kwinsi Williams (Trinidad & Tobago)
19 April 2022
17:30

SV Real Rincon (Bonaire)	1–3	(Turks and Caicos Islands) SWA Sharks FC
Celestijn 78'		Park 4'; Paul 50'; Beljour 66'

Estadio Centroamericano de Mayagüez, Mayagüez
Referee: Ben Hoskins (Canada)

=== Group C ===
Pos	Team	Pld	W	D	L	GF	GA	GD	Pts	Qualification
1	(Suriname) Inter Moengotapoe	2	2	0	0	9	5	+4	6	Knockout stage
2	(Martinique) Golden Lion FC	2	1	0	1	11	4	+7	3	
3	(Aruba) Deportivo Nacional	2	0	0	2	2	13	−11	0	

Source: CONCACAF
15 April 2022
15:00

Deportivo Nacional (Aruba)	2–5	(Suriname) Inter Moengotapoe
Aguirre 23'; Oliveros 53'		Kastiel 21'; Baja 75' (pen.); Kemble 77', 89'; Molle 86'

Estadio Centroamericano de Mayagüez, Mayagüez
Referee: Ben Hoskins (Canada)

17 April 2022
17:30

Deportivo Nacional (Aruba)	0–8	(Martinique) Golden Lion FC
		Parsemain 28', 30', 58', 61', 80'; Catherine 40'; Boriel 72'; Amasine 85'

Estadio Centroamericano de Mayagüez, Mayagüez
Attendance: 0
Referee: Shavin Greene (Guyana)

19 April 2022
20:00

Golden Lion FC (Martinique)	3–4	(Suriname) Inter Moengotapoe
Parsemain 64', 68', 90'		Darson 25'; Doorson 34'; Kwasie 45+2'; Baja 79'

Estadio Centroamericano de Mayagüez, Mayagüez
Referee: Fernando Morón (Panama)

== Knockout stage ==
=== Bracket ===
The semi-final matchups are:

- 2nd Best Group Winner vs. 3rd Best Group Winner
- Best Group Winner vs. Best Ranked second-place finisher

If the best ranked second-place finisher is from the same group as the Best Group Winner, then the semifinal matchups will be as follows:

- 2nd Best Group Winner vs. Best Ranked second-place finisher
- Best Group Winner vs. 3rd Best Group Winner

Semi-finals
22 April – Mayagüez
(Curaçao) Jong Holland	2
(Puerto Rico) Bayamon FC	3
22 April – Mayagüez
(Suriname) Inter Moengotapoe	4
(Guadeloupe) AS Gosier	0

Final
24 April – Mayagüez
(Puerto Rico) Bayamon FC (a.e.t.)	2
(Suriname) Inter Moengotapoe	1
Third place
24 April – Mayagüez
(Curaçao) Jong Holland	0
(Guadeloupe) AS Gosier	2

=== Semi-finals ===
22 April 2022
17:00

Jong Holland (Curaçao)	2–3	(Puerto Rico) Bayamon FC
Martina 23'; De Brito 90+5'		Almazán 85'; Hernández 90+8'; Rivera 90+13'

Estadio Centroamericano de Mayagüez, Mayagüez
Referee: Katja Koroleva (United States)

22 April 2022
20:00

Inter Moengotapoe (Suriname)	4–0	(Guadeloupe) AS Gosier
Cronie 15'; Fer 35'; Kwasie 78'; Édouard 88' (o.g.)

Estadio Centroamericano de Mayagüez, Mayagüez
Referee: Kwinsi Williams (Trinidad and Tobago)

=== Third place match ===
24 April 2022
17:00

Jong Holland (Curaçao)	0–2	(Guadeloupe) AS Gosier
		Nandkissori 52'; Popote 68'

Estadio Centroamericano de Mayagüez, Mayagüez
Referee: Fernando Moron (Panama)

=== Final ===
Winner advanced to CONCACAF League playoff against 2022 CONCACAF Caribbean Club Championship fourth-placed team for a place in 2022 CONCACAF League preliminary round, as they complied with the minimum CONCACAF Club Licensing requirements for the CONCACAF League.

24 April 2022
20:00

Bayamon FC (Puerto Rico)	2–1 (a.e.t.)	(Suriname) Inter Moengotapoe
Ranera 24', 120+1'		Darson 89'

Estadio Centroamericano de Mayagüez, Mayagüez
Referee: Daneon Parchment (Jamaica)

== See also ==
- 2022 Caribbean Club Championship
- 2022 CONCACAF League
- 2023 CONCACAF Champions League
