= 2020–21 Bermudian Premier Division =

Bermudian Premier Division
- Season: 2020–21
- Dates: 26 September 2020 – 11 April 2021
- Matches: 44
- Goals: 134 (3.05 per match)
- Biggest home win: Dandy Town Hornets 5-0 Somerset Eagles (25 October 2020)
- Biggest away win: PHC Zebras 1–6 Robin Hood (27 September 2020)
- Highest scoring: PHC Zebras 1–6 Robin Hood (27 September 2020)
- Longest winning run: 4 matches North Village Rams
- Longest unbeaten run: 8 matches Robin Hood
- Longest winless run: 6 matches X-Roads Warriors
- Longest losing run: 5 matches Somerset Eagles
- All statistics correct as of 27 December 2020.

The 2020–21 Bermudian Premier Division is the 58th season of the Bermudian Premier Division, the highest tier of football in Bermuda. The season began on 26 September 2020 and is scheduled to conclude on 11 April 2021. North Village Rams are the current champions from the previous season.

== Teams ==
=== Team changes ===
To Premier Division

Promoted from the 2019–20 First Division

- Devonshire Colts
- St. George's Colts

From Premier Division

Relegated to the 2020–21 First Division

- Boulevard Blazers

Though Somerset Eagles finished in 9th place the previous season, the club was reprieved from relegation and the Premier League will be played with 11 teams this season.

=== Stadia and locations ===
Locations of the 2019–20 Premier Division teams

Team	Home parish	Home ground	Capacity
Dandy Town Hornets	Pembroke	St John's Field	
Devonshire Colts	Devonshire	Police Recreation Field	
Devonshire Cougars	Devonshire	Devonshire Recreation Club	
North Village Rams	Pembroke	Bernard's Park	
PHC Zebras	Warwick	PHC Field	2,000
Robin Hood	Pembroke	Goose Gosling Field	
Somerset Eagles	Sandys	White Hill Field	
Somerset Trojans	Sandys	Somerset Cricket Club Field	1,000
Southampton Rangers	Southampton	Southampton Oval	1,000
St. George's Colts	St. George's	Wellington Oval Field	
X-Roads Warriors	St George's	Garrison Field	

== League table ==
Pos	Team	Pld	W	D	L	GF	GA	GD	Pts	Qualification or relegation
1	Robin Hood	8	7	1	0	26	5	+21	22	Eligibility for entry into the Caribbean Club Shield
2	Devonshire Cougars	9	5	2	2	17	7	+10	17	
3	PHC Zebras	9	5	2	2	17	14	+3	17	
4	Dandy Town Hornets	7	4	2	1	15	9	+6	14	
5	Somerset Trojans	8	4	2	2	8	8	0	14	
6	North Village Rams	8	3	2	3	10	12	−2	11	
7	Devonshire Colts	8	2	2	4	15	13	+2	8	
8	Southampton Rangers	8	2	2	4	8	12	−4	8	
9	X-Roads Warriors	8	1	2	5	7	17	−10	5	Relegation to the Bermuda First Division
10	St. George's Colts	8	1	1	6	5	13	−8	4	Relegation to the Bermuda First Division
11	Somerset Eagles	7	1	0	6	6	24	−18	3	Relegation to the Bermuda First Division

Updated to match(es) played on 5 December 2020. Source: Soccerway

== Results ==
Home \ Away	DTH	DCO	DVC	NVR	PHC	RBH	SSE	SST	SOU	SGC	XRW
Dandy Town Hornets	—	2–0		2–2			5–0			abd	1–0
Devonshire Colts		—	0–0					1–2	2–3	4–2	
Devonshire Cougars			—		3–1	0–1	5–1	2–2	3–0		
North Village Rams		2–1		—			abd			1–0	2–2
PHC Zebras		2–2			—	1–6				2–1	
Robin Hood	5–1			3–0		—	4–1	2–0	2–2		
Somerset Eagles		0–4			1–3		—				3–2
Somerset Trojans	1–3			1–0	0–0		1–0	—			
Southampton Rangers	1–1			0–2	0–1				—	0–1	
St. George's Colts			0–1			0–3		0–1		—	1–1
X-Roads Warriors		2–1	0–3		0–4				0–2		—

Updated to match(es) played on 5 December 2020. Source: Soccerway
Legend: Blue = home team win; Yellow = draw; Red = away team win.
