= Football association =

Governing body of association football

A football association, also known as a football federation, soccer federation, or soccer association, is a governing body for association football. Many of them are members of the sport's regional bodies such as UEFA and CONMEBOL and the world governing body, FIFA. A small number have not yet applied for or been granted entry to these higher bodies. Below is a list of football associations for which there are articles.

== Asia ==
Asian Football Confederation affiliated

- Afghanistan Football Federation
- Football Australia
- Bahrain Football Association
- Bangladesh Football Federation
- Bhutan Football Federation
- Football Association of Brunei Darussalam
- Myanmar Football Federation
- Football Federation of Cambodia
- Chinese Football Association
- Chinese Taipei Football Association
- East Timor Football Federation
- Guam Football Association
- Hong Kong Football Association
- All India Football Federation
- Football Association of Indonesia
- Football Federation Islamic Republic of Iran
- Iraq Football Association
- Japan Football Association
- Jordan Football Association
- Korea Football Association
- Kuwait Football Association
- Football Federation of the Kyrgyz Republic
- Lao Football Federation
- Lebanon Football Association
- Macau Football Association
- Football Association of Malaysia
- Football Association of Maldives
- Mongolian Football Federation
- All Nepal Football Association
- DPR Korea Football Association
- Northern Mariana Islands Football Association
- Oman Football Association
- Pakistan Football Federation
- Palestinian Football Association
- Philippine Football Federation
- Qatar Football Association
- Saudi Arabian Football Federation
- Football Association of Singapore
- Football Federation of Sri Lanka
- Syrian Football Association
- Tajikistan Football Federation
- Football Association of Thailand
- Football Federation of Turkmenistan
- United Arab Emirates Football Association
- Uzbekistan Football Federation
- Vietnam Football Federation
- Yemen Football Association

=== Defunct ===
- Brunei Football Association

== Africa ==
Confederation of African Football affiliated

- Algerian Football Federation
- Angolan Football Federation
- Benin Football Federation
- Botswana Football Association
- Burkinabé Football Federation
- Football Federation of Burundi
- Cameroonian Football Federation
- Cape Verdean Football Federation
- Central African Football Federation
- Chadian Football Federation
- Comoros Football Federation
- Congolese Football Federation
- Congolese Association Football Federation
- Djiboutian Football Federation
- Egyptian Football Association
- Equatoguinean Football Federation
- Eritrean National Football Federation
- Eswatini Football Association
- Ethiopian Football Federation
- Gabonese Football Federation
- Gambia Football Association
- Ghana Football Association
- Guinean Football Federation
- Football Federation of Guinea-Bissau
- Ivorian Football Federation
- Football Kenya Federation
- Lesotho Football Association
- Liberia Football Association
- Libyan Football Federation
- Malagasy Football Federation
- Football Association of Malawi
- Malian Football Federation
- Football Federation of the Islamic Republic of Mauritania
- Mauritius Football Association
- Royal Moroccan Football Federation
- Mozambican Football Federation
- Namibia Football Association
- Nigerien Football Federation
- Nigeria Football Federation
- Réunionese Football League
- Rwandese Association Football Federation
- São Toméan Football Federation
- Senegalese Football Federation
- Seychelles Football Federation
- Sierra Leone Football Association
- Somali Football Federation
- South African Football Association
- Sudan Football Association
- South Sudan Football Association
- Tanzania Football Federation
- Togolese Football Federation
- Tunisian Football Federation
- Federation of Uganda Football Associations
- Football Association of Zambia
- Zanzibar Football Association
- Zimbabwe Football Association

== North, Central America and Caribbean ==
Confederation of North, Central American and Caribbean Association Football affiliated

=== North America ===
North American Football Union

- Canadian Soccer Association
- Mexican Football Federation
- United States Soccer Federation

=== Central America ===
Central American Football Union

- Football Federation of Belize
- Costa Rican Football Federation
- Salvadoran Football Association
- National Football Federation of Guatemala
- National Autonomous Federation of Football of Honduras
- Nicaraguan Football Federation
- Panamanian Football Federation

=== Caribbean ===
Caribbean Football Union

- Anguilla Football Association
- Antigua and Barbuda Football Association
- Aruba Football Federation
- Bahamas Football Association
- Barbados Football Association
- Bermuda Football Association
- Bonaire Football Federation
- British Virgin Islands Football Association
- Cayman Islands Football Association
- Football Association of Cuba
- Curaçao Football Federation
- Dominica Football Association
- Dominican Football Federation
- Grenada Football Association
- Guadeloupean League of Football
- Guyana Football Federation
- Ligue de Football de la Guyane
- Haitian Football Federation
- Jamaica Football Federation
- Ligue de football de la Martinique
- Montserrat Football Association
- Puerto Rican Football Federation
- St. Kitts and Nevis Football Association
- Saint Lucia Football Association
- Football Committee of Saint Martin
- Saint Vincent and the Grenadines Football Federation
- Sint Maarten Soccer Association
- Surinamese Football Association
- Trinidad and Tobago Football Association
- Turks and Caicos Islands Football Association
- U.S. Virgin Islands Soccer Federation

=== Defunct ===
- Netherlands Antillean Football Union

== South America ==
South American Football Confederation affiliated

- Argentine Football Association
- Bolivian Football Federation
- Brazilian Football Confederation
- Chilean Football Federation
- Colombian Football Federation
- Ecuadorian Football Federation
- Paraguayan Football Association
- Peruvian Football Federation
- Uruguayan Football Association
- Venezuelan Football Federation

== Oceania ==
Oceania Football Confederation affiliated

- Football Federation American Samoa
- Cook Islands Football Association
- Fiji Football Association
- Kiribati Islands Football Association
- New Caledonian Football Federation
- New Zealand Football
- Papua New Guinea Football Association
- Football Federation Samoa
- Solomon Islands Football Federation
- Tahitian Football Federation
- Tonga Football Association
- Tuvalu National Football Association
- Vanuatu Football Federation

== Europe ==
Union of European Football Associations affiliated

- Albanian Football Association
- Andorran Football Federation
- Football Federation of Armenia
- Austrian Football Association
- Association of Football Federations of Azerbaijan
- Football Federation of Belarus
- Royal Belgian Football Association
- Football Federation of Bosnia and Herzegovina
- Bulgarian Football Union
- Croatian Football Federation
- Cyprus Football Association
- Football Association of the Czech Republic
- Danish Football Association
- The Football Association
- Estonian Football Association
- Faroe Islands Football Association
- Football Association of Finland
- French Football Federation
- Georgian Football Federation
- German Football Association
- Gibraltar Football Association
- Hellenic Football Federation
- Hungarian Football Federation
- Football Association of Iceland
- Football Association of Ireland
- Israel Football Association
- Italian Football Federation
- Football Federation of Kazakhstan
- Football Federation of Kosovo
- Latvian Football Federation
- Liechtenstein Football Association
- Lithuanian Football Federation
- Luxembourg Football Federation
- Football Federation of Macedonia
- Malta Football Association
- Football Association of Moldova
- Football Association of Montenegro
- Royal Dutch Football Association
- Irish Football Association
- Football Association of Norway
- Polish Football Association
- Portuguese Football Federation
- Romanian Football Federation
- Russian Football Union
- San Marino Football Federation
- Scottish Football Association
- Football Association of Serbia
- Slovak Football Association
- Football Association of Slovenia
- Royal Spanish Football Federation
- Swedish Football Association
- Swiss Football Association
- Turkish Football Federation
- Football Federation of Ukraine
- Football Association of Wales

=== Defunct ===
- Deutscher Fußball-Verband der DDR (East Germany)
- Saarland Football Association
- Football Association of Serbia and Montenegro
- Football Federation of the Soviet Union
- Football Association of Yugoslavia
