= Concordia, Saint Martin =

Concordia Concordia
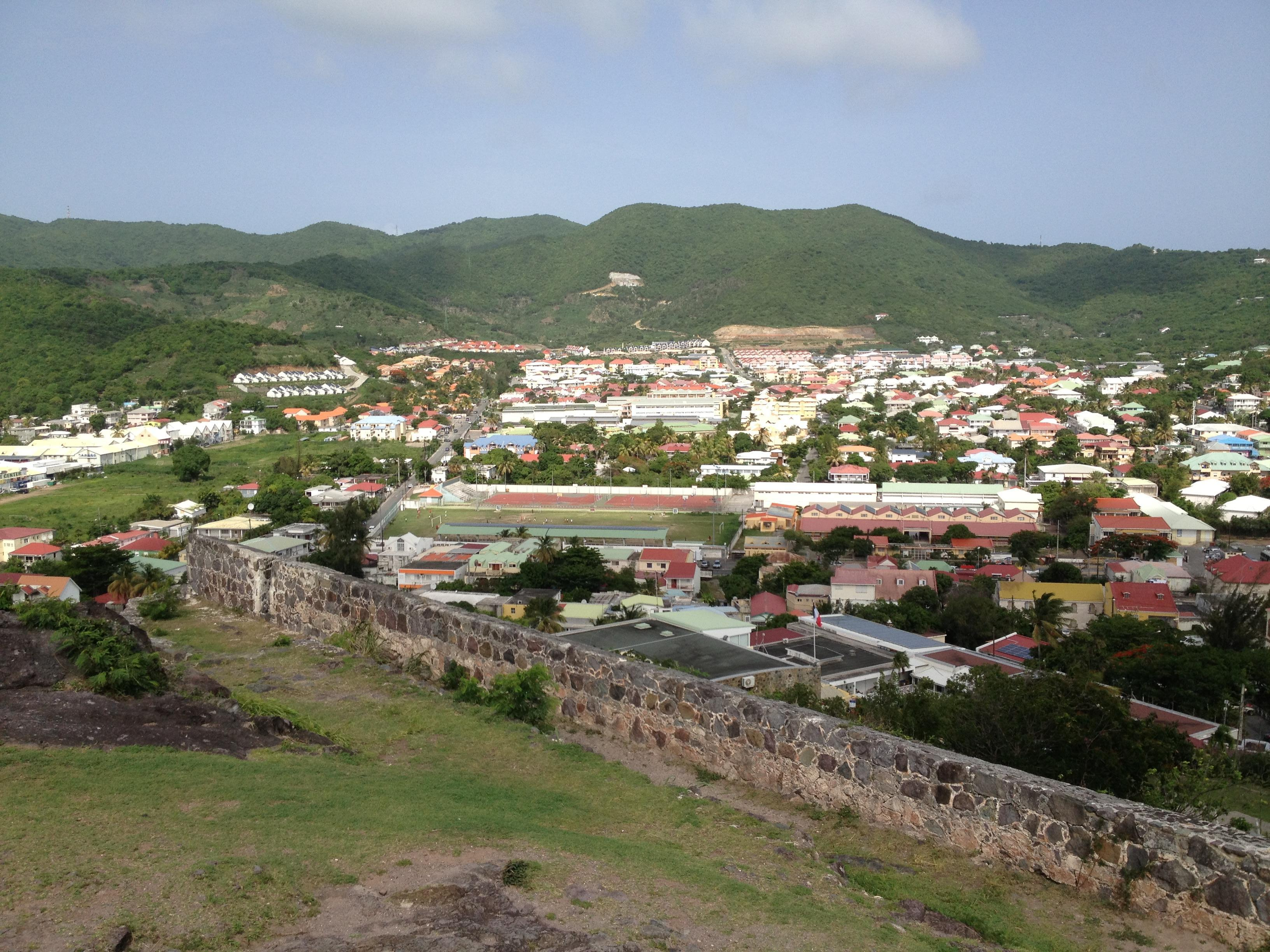
- View of Concordia from Fort St. Louis, Saint Martin

- Location within Saint-Martin
- Coordinates: 18°03′36″N 63°04′41″W
- Country: France
- Overseas collectivity: Saint Martin

Population (2016)
  - Total: 5,639

Concordia is a small town on the French side of the island of Saint Martin in the Caribbean. It lies directly to the south of the French side's capital Marigot. The town has a population of 5,639 residents, as of 2016, making it the third most-populous town on the French side, behind Marigot and Grand Case.
