= Saint-Martin Senior League =

Saint-Martin Championships
- Founded: 1970; 56 years ago
- First season: 1970
- Country: Collectivity of Saint Martin
- Confederation: CONCACAF
- Number of clubs: 10
- Level on pyramid: 1
- Domestic cup: Coupe des Îles du Nord
- League cup: Coupe de Saint-Martin
- International cup: CFU Club Shield
- Current champions: Junior Stars (2024-25)
- Most championships: ASC St. Louis Stars (20 titles)
- Website: Saint-Martin Football Association

The Saint-Martin League (French: Ligue de Saint-Martin) is the top division of association football in the Collectivity of Saint Martin. The defending champions are Junior Stars FC, and the most successful club is ASC St. Louis Stars.

== Stadia & locations ==
Team	Location	Stadium	Capacity
Orléans Attackers	Quartier-d'Orleans	Stade Thelbert Carti	2,500
Saint-Louis Stars	Sandy Ground	Stade Alberic Richards	2,600
Concordia	Marigot	Stade Jean-Louis Vanterpool	2,000
Flamingo	Quartier-d'Orleans	Stade Thelbert Carti	2,500
FC Marigot	Sandy Ground	Stade Alberic Richards	2,600
Junior Stars	Marigot	Stade Jean-Louis Vanterpool	2,000
United Stars	Grand Case	Grande Case Sports Complex	250
Juventus de Saint-Martin	Sandy Ground	Stade Alberic Richards	2,600

Saint-Martin Senior League clubs
- 1 United Stars
- 2 Flamingo, Orléans Attacker
- 3 Juventus de Saint-Martin, Marigot, St. Louis Stars
- 4 Concordia, Junior Stars

== Champions ==
Ed.	Season	Champion
1	1970–71	Junior Stars
2	1971–72	Junior Stars
3	1972–73	Junior Stars
4	1973–74	Saint-Louis Stars
5	1974–75	Saint-Louis Stars
6	1975–76	Saint-Louis Stars
7	1976–77	Saint-Louis Stars
8	1977–78	Saint-Louis Stars
9	1978–79	Saint-Louis Stars
10	1979–80	Junior Stars
11	1980–81	Junior Stars
12	1981–82	Saint-Louis Stars
13	1982–83	Saint-Louis Stars
14	1983–84	Saint-Louis Stars
15	1984–85	Saint-Louis Stars
16	1985–86	Junior Stars
17	1986–87	Saint-Louis Stars
18	1987–88	Saint-Louis Stars
19	1988–89	Saint-Louis Stars
20	1989–90	Junior Stars
21	1990–91	Junior Stars
22	1991–92	Saint-Louis Stars
23	1992–93	Saint-Louis Stars
24	1993–94	Saint-Louis Stars
25	1994–95	Saint-Louis Stars
26	1995–96	Saint-Louis Stars
27	1996–97	Saint-Louis Stars
28	1997–98	Jah Rebels
29	1998–99	Jah Rebels
30	1999–00	Junior Stars
31	2000–01	Sporting Club
32	2001–02	Orléans Attackers
33	2002–03	Junior Stars
34	2003–04	Juventus de Saint-Martin
35	2004–05	Orleans Attackers
36	2005–06	Orleans Attackers
37	2006–07	Orleans Attackers
38	2007–08	Orleans Attackers
39	2008–09	Saint-Louis Stars
40	2009–10	Orleans Attackers
41	2010–11	Junior Stars
42	2011–12	Concordia
43	2012–13	Orleans Attackers
44	2013–14	Junior Stars
45	2014–15	Orléans Attackers
46	2015–16	FC Concordia
47	2016–17	Marigot
–	2017–18	not held due to cyclones Irma and Maria
48	2018–19	Junior Stars
–	2019–20	not held due to COVID-19
49	2020–21	Junior Stars
50	2021–22	Junior Stars
51	2022–23	Junior Stars
52	2023–24	Junior Stars
53	2024-25	Junior Stars

== Titles by club ==
Club	Titles	Seasons won
Saint-Louis Stars	20	1973–74, 1974–75, 1975–76, 1976–77, 1977–78, 1978–79, 1981–82, 1982–83, 1983–84, 1984–95, 1986–87, 1987–88, 1988–89, 1991–92, 1992–93, 1993–94, 1994–95, 1995–96, 2008–09, 2017
Junior Stars	18	1970–71, 1971–72, 1972–73, 1979–80, 1980–81, 1985–86, 1989–90, 1990–91, 1999–00, 2002–03, 2010–11, 2013–14, 2018–19, 2020–21, 2021–22, 2022–23, 2023-24, 2024-25
Orléans Attackers	8	2001–02, 2004–05, 2005–06, 2006–07, 2007–08, 2009–10, 2012–13, 2015
Concordia	2	2011–12, 2015-16
Jah Rebels	2	1997–98, 1998–99
Sporting Club	1	2000–01
Juventus de Saint-Martin	1	2003–04

== Top goalscorers ==
Season	Player	Team	Goals
2020-21	(Collectivity of Saint Martin) Yannick Bellechasse	Junior Stars	
2023-24	(Collectivity of Saint Martin) Yannick Bellechasse	Junior Stars	17
2024-25	(Collectivity of Saint Martin) Imri Chevalier	Junior Stars	8
2025-26	Fleming Raheim	Junior Stars	18

== Saint Martin clubs in CONCACAF competitions ==
Below is a list of results by clubs from the Saint-Martin Senior League in official CONCACAF competitions.

Club	Competition	Round	Opponent	Score
Juventus de Saint-Martin	2004 CFU Club Championship	First Round	(Suriname) Inter Moengotapoe	0–2
Juventus de Saint-Martin	2004 CFU Club Championship	First Round	(Suriname) Inter Moengotapoe	1–1
Junior Stars	2022 Caribbean Club Shield	Group Stage	(Puerto Rico) Bayamón	3–3
Junior Stars	2022 Caribbean Club Shield	Group Stage	(Dominica) South East	1–1
Junior Stars	2023 CONCACAF Caribbean Shield	Group Stage	(Curaçao) Jong Holland	1–2
Junior Stars	2023 CONCACAF Caribbean Shield	Group Stage	(Puerto Rico) Metropolitan	0–3
Junior Stars	2023 CONCACAF Caribbean Shield	Group Stage	(Saint Kitts and Nevis) St. Paul's United	1–1
Junior Stars	2024 CFU Club Shield	Preliminary Round	(Dominica) Dublanc	0–2

== See also ==
- Saint-Barthelemy Championships
