= AS Juventus de Saint-Martin =

Juventus de Saint-Martin
- Full name: Association Sportive Juventus de Saint-Martin
- Founded: 2002
- Ground: Stade Alberic Richards
- Capacity: 2,600
- Chairman: Myriame Merlo
- League: Saint-Martin Senior League
- 2024–25: 3rd
| Home colours | Away colours |

AS Juventus de Saint-Martin is a Saint Martin professional football club based in Sandy Ground. Club colors are black and white.

In the 2003–04 season, the club won the Saint-Martin Championships, the top tier of football in the Collectivity of Saint Martin. The club withdrew from the 2014/15 competition.

== Honours ==
- Saint-Martin Championships

Champions (1): 2003–04
