= SXM Elite Championship =

Association football league

- Founded: 2022; 4 years ago
- Abolished: 2023; 3 years ago
- Region: Saint Martin (island)
- Teams: 8
- Last champions: (France) Orléans Attackers
- Most championships: (France) Orléans Attackers

SXM Elite Championship was an all-island top level association football league in Sint Maarten and Saint Martin, which was held once during the 2022–23 season.

== History ==
The SXM Elite Championship was founded in 2023. 4 clubs from each side of the island entered.

Knockout matches that were tied at full time proceeded to extra time.

== Results ==
Season	Winners	Score	Runners-up
2023	Orléans Attackers (Collectivity of Saint Martin)	4–3 (a.e.t)	(Collectivity of Saint Martin) AS Phoenicks
