= Grand Case–Espérance Airport =

L'Espérance Airport Grand Case Airport Aéroport de Grand-Case l'Espérance
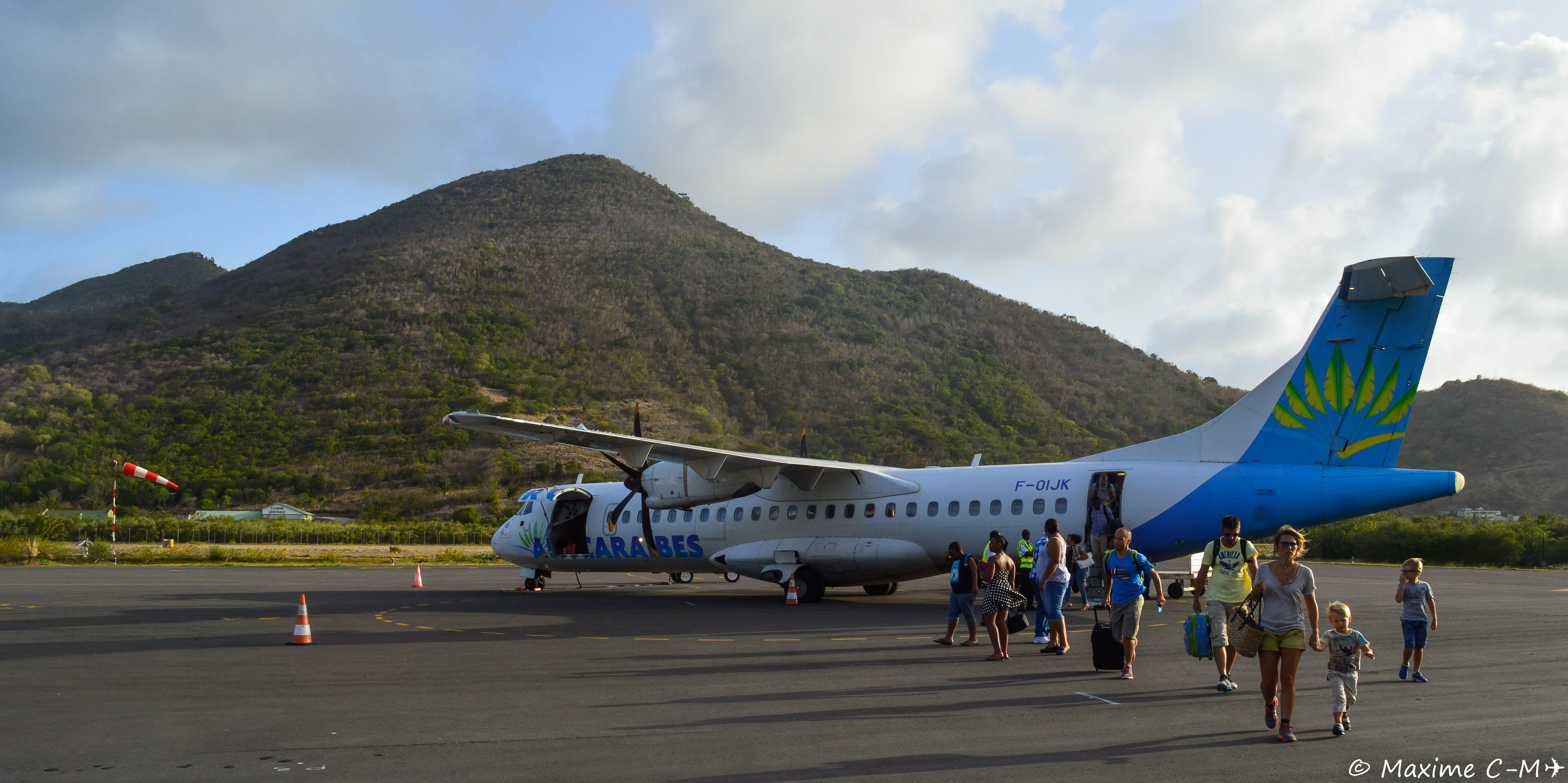
- Passengers deboard an Air Caraïbes ATR 72 at L'Espérance Airport (2015)
- IATA: SFG; ICAO: TFFG

Summary
- Airport type: Public
- Owner: Collectivité de Saint Martin
- Operator: EDEIS
- Serves: Saint-Martin
- Location: Grand Case
- Elevation AMSL: 20 ft (6.1 m)
- Coordinates: 18°06′02″N 063°02′56″W
- Website: saintmartin-airport.com

Map
- Location in Saint-Martin

Runways
| Direction | Length | | Surface |
| Direction | m | ft | Surface |
|---|---|---|---|
| 12/30 | 1,200 | 3,937 | Asphalt |

Statistics (2018)
- Passengers: 192,285
- Sources: French AIP, IATA, Aeroport.fr SkyVector

L'Espérance Airport (IATA: SFG, ICAO: TFFG), also known as Grand Case Airport (French: Aérodrome de Grand-Case Espérance), is a public use airport located in Grand Case, on the French side of the Caribbean island of Saint Martin. The airport is mainly used for flights by regional passenger aircraft (ATR) flying to Guadeloupe and Saint Barth, as well as used by private aircraft. It is the second and smaller airport of Saint Maarten, after Princess Juliana International Airport (SXM) which is located on the Dutch side of the island.

Grand Case airport is managed by EDEIS, a major player in airport operations and engineering in France where it manages 18 airports.

In 2017, the renovation of the airport was completed that included a modernized terminal building, fire station upgrade, extended parking apron, and new control tower. In 2018 a new hangar for line maintenance purposes was completed.

== Tower ==
The air traffic control tower at Princess Juliana Airport on the Dutch side of St. Maarten has two radar systems at their disposal with a range of 50 nautical miles (93 km; 58 mi) and 250 NM (460 km; 290 mi). PJIA air traffic control manages 4,000 sq nmi (14,000 km^{2}; 5,300 sq mi) of airspace around the airport. Besides providing approach, tower and ground control at PJIA, Juliana air traffic services also provides approach control for Grand Case airport.

== Airlines and destinations ==
The following commercial airlines provide scheduled passenger service:

| Airlines | Destinations |
|---|---|
| Air Caraïbes | Fort-de-France, Pointe-à-Pitre |
| St Barth Commuter | Saint Barthélemy |
