= Junior Stars FC =

- Full name: Junior Stars Football Club
- Nickname: Horse Men
- Founded: 1965
- Ground: Stade Alberic Richards, Sandy Ground
- Capacity: 2,600
- Chairman: Ernest Pierre
- Manager: Jérôme Damienne
- League: Saint-Martin Senior League
- 2024–25: 1st, Champions

Junior Stars FC is a Martinois professional football club based in Sandy Ground. The club competes in the Saint-Martin Senior League, the top tier of Martinois football. The club was founded in 1965, and play their home matches in the 2,600-capacity, Stade Alberic Richards.

== History ==
Junior Stars FC was founded in 1965. In 2024, clubs from Saint Martin began entering in Coupe de France. In 2025, Junior Stars was the collectivity's representative in the competition and was drawn against Dynamo Le Moule of Guadeloupe's Division of Honour in the Third Round. With the score level at the end of regulation, Junior Stars went on to win 5–4 on penalties. Despite the historic victory, the club was disqualified from playing its fourth round match over fielding too many players signed after the registration period closed.

== Achievements ==
- Saint-Martin Senior League

Winners (18): 1970–71, 1971–72, 1972–73, 1979–80, 1980–81, 1985–86, 1989–90, 1990–91, 1999–00, 2002–03, 2010–11, 2013–14, 2018–19, 2020–21, 2021–22, 2022–23, 2023-24, 2024-25

== International results ==
Junior Stars FC's scores are listed first.

Competition	Round	Opponent	Score
2022 Caribbean Club Shield	Group Stage	(Puerto Rico) Bayamón	3–3
2022 Caribbean Club Shield	Group Stage	(Dominica) South East	1–1
2023 CONCACAF Caribbean Shield	Group Stage	(Curaçao) Jong Holland	1–2
2023 CONCACAF Caribbean Shield	Group Stage	(Puerto Rico) Metropolitan	0–3
2023 CONCACAF Caribbean Shield	Group Stage	(Saint Kitts and Nevis) St. Paul's United	1–1
2024 CFU Club Shield	Preliminary Round	(Dominica) Dublanc	0–2
