= Football in Saint Martin =

The sport of association football in the French half of the island of Saint Martin is run by the Comité de Football des Îles du Nord. The association administers the national football team, as well as the Saint-Martin Championships.

Despite being known to be eligible for the Coupe de France, Saint Martin is not known to have entered a club to that tournament.

Saint Martin started entering teams to the Caribbean CFU Club Shield tournament from the 2022 season onwards, having previously participated once in the Caribbean Club Championship in the 2004 season.

Saint Martin entered 4 clubs in the SXM Elite Championship all-island tournament as of its initial 2022–23 tournament.

== League system ==
Level	League(s)/Division(s)
1	Saint-Martin Championships; 8 clubs
