= Orléans Attackers FC =

Orléans Attackers
- Full name: Attackers Football Club
- Founded: 1993
- Ground: Stade Thelbert Carti, Quartier-d'Orleans, Collectivity of Saint Martin
- Capacity: 2,500
- League: Saint-Martin Championships
- 2025: 4th

Orléans Attackers is a Saint Martin professional football club based in Quartier-d'Orleans. Club colors are black and orange.

The club won 8 Saint-Martin Championships, the top tier of football in the Collectivity of Saint Martin.

== Honours ==
- Saint-Martin Championships: 8

2001–02, 2004–05, 2005–06, 2006–07, 2007–08, 2009–10, 2012–13, 2014–15
