= ASC St. Louis Stars =

- Full name: Association Sportive et Culturelle de Saint-Louis
- Founded: 1969 (As Apollo Stars)
- Ground: Stade Alberic Richards
- Capacity: 2,600
- Manager: Henry Connor
- League: Saint-Martin Senior League
- 2024–25: 2nd

St. Louis Stars is a sports club formed in 1969, a founding member of the Saint-Martin Senior League which was established in 1970. St. Louis is the most successful club in Saint-Martin with 20 league titles.

The club qualified for the 2018 CFU Club Championship, having finished in the top two of the 2016–17 Saint-Martin Senior League.

== Honours ==
- Saint-Martin Championships
  - Champions (20): 1973–74, 1974–75, 1975–76, 1976–77, 1977–78, 1978–1979, 1981–82, 1982–83 1983–84, 1984–85, 1986–87, 1987–88, 1988–89, 1991–92, 1992–93, 1993/94, 1994–95, 1995–96, 2000–01, 2008–09
