= Junior Stars =

Professional wrestling tag team

Tag team
- Members: Minoru Tanaka; Koji Kanemoto
- Name(s): Junior Stars
- Billed heights: Tanaka: 1.75 m (5 ft 9 in); Kanemoto: 1.80 m (5 ft 11 in)
- Combined billed weight: 165 kg (364 lb)
- Debut: October 1999
- Years active: 1999–2001, 2004, 2012–present

Junior Stars (ジュニアスターズ, Juniasutāzu) is a professional wrestling tag team consisting of Minoru Tanaka and Koji Kanemoto. Forming in 1999, the team became one of the most popular in New Japan Pro-Wrestling (NJPW), winning the IWGP Junior Heavyweight Tag Team Championship in June 2000. After Kanemoto joined Team 2000 and Minoru became the masked Heat character in 2002, the team went on hiatus until 2004, when they reunited albeit for one night only as Minoru turned on Kanemoto during the match. The team officially reunited in All Japan Pro Wrestling (AJPW) in 2012, where they won the All Asia Tag Team Championship twice. The two left AJPW to join the newly formed Wrestle-1 in 2013, and continue to team together on the Japanese independent circuit.

== History ==
=== Early years (1999-2001) ===
Initially rivals, Kanemoto and Tanaka began teaming together in October 1999, and immediately set their sights on the IWGP Junior Heavyweight Tag Team Championship, then held by Shinjiro Otani and Tatsuhito Takaiwa. On October 11, the duo was unsuccessful in their challenge for the titles. Despite the loss, they continued to team together into 2000, and in June defeated Otani and Takaiwa to win the titles for the first time at Summer Struggle. The two held the titles until March 2001, when they were forced to vacate after Kanemoto suffered a legitimate injury during the match.

=== Break-up (2002–2004) ===
Kanemoto eventually returned in October that year, turning on Minoru and becoming a heel in the process, joining Team 2000. As a reward for his defection and betrayal of Tanaka, Team 2000 leader Masahiro Chono gave Kanemoto his own sub-group to lead named "Team 2000 Jr." In his first match back, Kanemoto and the rest of Team 2000 Jr (Akira and Gedo & Jado) defeated El Samurai, Jushin Thunder Liger, Katsuyori Shibata and Minoru Tanaka, with Kanemoto last pinning Minoru for the win. Kanemoto achieved much singles success throughout 2002, while Minoru struggled to gain any traction with his new Heat character. The two eventually faced off for the IWGP Junior Heavyweight Championship on October 14 at The Spiral, with Kanemoto coming out on top. Team 2000 went their own separate ways in late 2002 and Kanemoto thus slowly began to turn face, taking on the role of a no nonsense veteran. As Kanemoto became a fan favourite once again, Heat finally began to achieve success, beating Jado for the IWGP Junior Heavyweight Championship in December 2003. In 2004, Heat and Kanemoto slowly became allies again, teaming together throughout the year.

=== 2nd breakup (2004-2011) ===
On October 9, 2004, at Pro-Wrestlers Be Strongest, Minoru returned to his birth name and the Junior Stars re-united to take on Gedo and Jado for the IWGP Junior Heavyweight Tag Team Championship. After Kanemoto finally tagged Minoru in, he shocked the New Japan fans by attacking Kanemoto and helping Gedo and Jado win, turning heel and joining Control Terrorism Unit (C.T.U.) in the process. After turning heel, Minoru wrestled as both himself and Heat throughout late 2004, and the two faced off for the IWGP Junior Heavyweight Championship twice in late 2004, with the first match ending by double knockout and the second with Heat pinning Kanemoto.

=== All Japan Pro Wrestling (2011-present) ===
October 9, 2004 would be the last time the Junior Stars teamed together during both their runs in NJPW, with Minoru leaving after his contract expired in 2009. The only time the two teamed together during this period was a one-off match where they defeated Masaaki Mochizuki and Shinjiro Otani at Masaaki Mochizuki's 15th Anniversary show in December 2008. After Kanemoto began competing outside of NJPW in 2011, he debuted for All Japan Pro Wrestling (AJPW) on March 6, re-forming the Junior Stars with Minoru to defeat Kaz Hayashi and Shuji Kondo. The two once again teamed up for the 2011 Junior Tag League, making it to the final where they just barely lost out to Kai and Hayashi in a match that went over 30 minutes. Kanemoto once again returned to AJPW in November and the two entered the 2011 Real World Tag League and performed well, defeating the likes of Manabu Soya and Takao Omori and Masanobu Fuchi and Taiyo Kea, but were unable to reach the final and finished the tournament with 8 points. In 2012, Kanemoto was traded to All Japan full time and the Junior Stars officially re-formed, defeating Turmeric Storm (Tomoaki Honma and Kazushi Miyamoto) to win the All Asia Tag Team Championship on October 21. In 2013, Kanemoto joined Tanaka's stable Stack of Arms alongside Masayuki Kono and Masakatsu Funaki. The two remained with AJPW until June 25, 2013, when they left the promotion in a mass-exodus.

=== Wrestle-1 (2013-2014) ===
Kanemoto and Tanaka were both part of the mass exodus from All Japan Pro Wrestling (AJPW) to form Wrestle-1, led by Keiji Mutoh. They continued to team together in Wrestle-1, and earned a shot at the TNA World Tag Team Championship in June 2014, unsuccessfully challenging The Wolves (Davey Richards and Eddie Edwards) on July 6.

=== Freelance (2016-present) ===
After Kanemoto left Wrestle-1 in 2014, he began to compete independently once again, and started to work for Pro Wrestling Zero1 in 2016. After Minoru eventually left Wrestle-1 in 2016, they reformed once again in Zero1 and won the NWA International Lightweight Tag Team Championship from Isami Kodaka and Takumi Tsukamoto in March 2017. The two became rivals once again in late 2018 in Minoru's new home promotion of Pro Wrestling Noah. On November 25, 2018, Kanemoto and Hiroshi Yamato unsuccessfully challenged Minoru and Hi69 for the GHC Junior Heavyweight Tag Team Championship.

== Championships and accomplishments ==
- New Japan Pro-Wrestling (NJPW)
  - IWGP Junior Heavyweight Tag Team Championship (one time)
- All Japan Pro Wrestling (AJPW)
  - All Asia Tag Team Championship (two times)
- Pro Wrestling Zero1
  - NWA International Lightweight Tag Team Championship (one time)
