= FC Concordia (Saint-Martin) =

- Full name: Football Club Concordia
- Founded: 1997
- Ground: Stade Jean-Louis Vanterpool; Marigot, Saint Martin
- Capacity: 2,000
- Chairman: Didier Samer
- Manager: Sham Pascal
- League: Saint-Martin Championships
- 2014/15: 4th

FC Concordia is a Saint Martin football club that currently plays in the Saint-Martin Championships, the highest level of football on Saint Martin. The club's home ground is the Stade Jean-Louis Vanterpool in Marigot, Saint Martin.

== Current squad ==
As of 2 January 2016

Note: Flags indicate national team as defined under FIFA eligibility rules; some limited exceptions apply. Players may hold more than one non-FIFA nationality.

No.	Pos.	Nation	Player
3		SMN	Lennon Michael
4		SMN	Wong Basil
5	DF	SMN	Wesley Jeffrey
10		SMN	Allen Glenville
11	FW	SMN	Laurent Samer
12		SMN	Frederick Hubert
16		SMN	Shem Pascal
—		SMN	Yvan Fantilus
—		SMN	Andrice Laine
—		SMN	Franko Sainval

No.	Pos.	Nation	Player
—		SMN	Giovani Richardson
—		SMN	Jean Cocly
—		SMN	Jonathan Galy
—		SMN	Lindsay Moncherry
—		SMN	Loxley Parker
—		SMN	Mathew Emboule
—		SMN	Micar Alexandre
—		SMN	Pierre Gaspard
—		SMN	Shaquille Duggins

== Achievements ==
- Saint-Martin Championships champions (1): 2011/12
