= Grand Case =

Grand Case Grand-Case
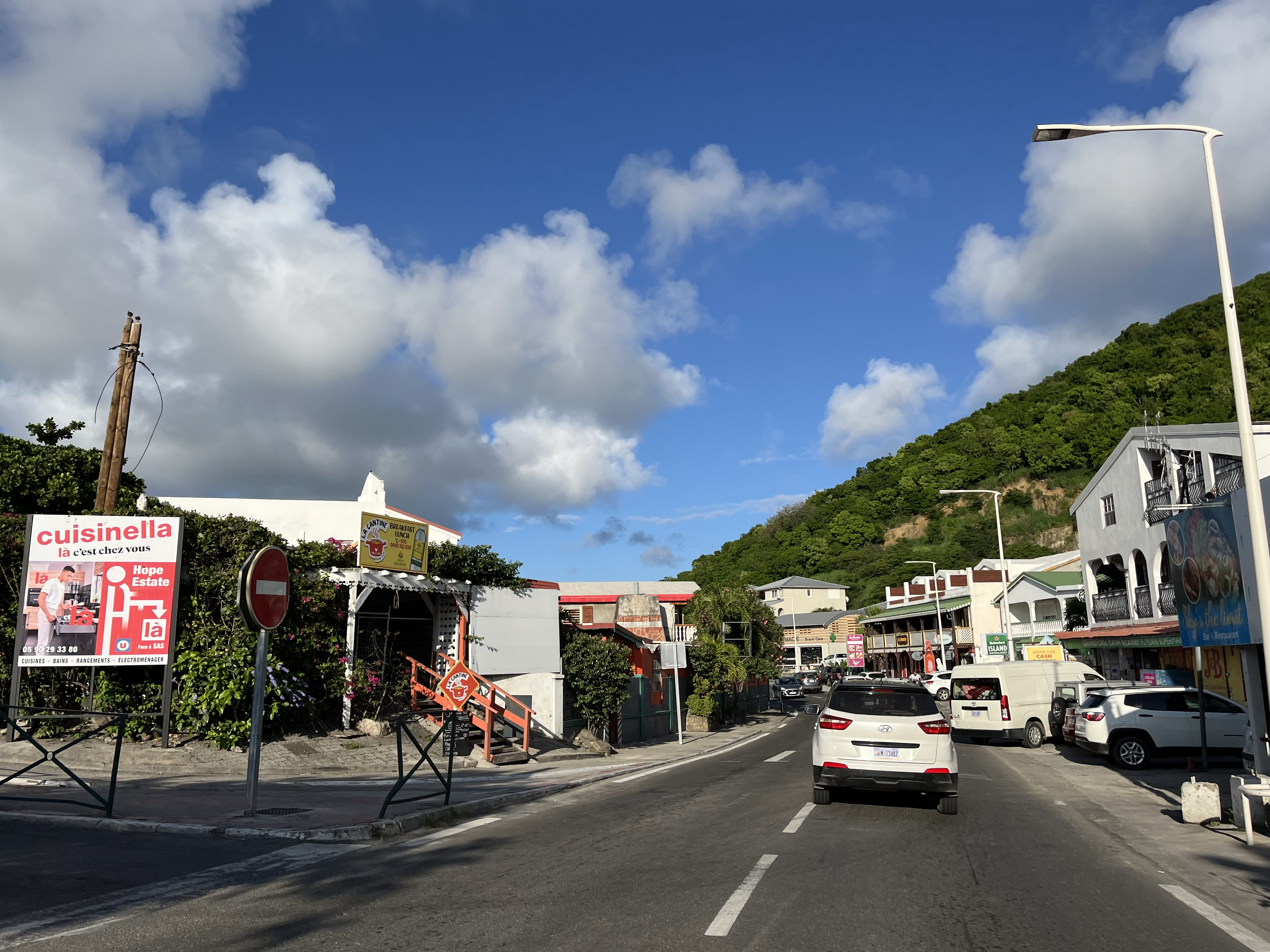

- Location within Saint-Martin
- Coordinates: 18°06′04″N 63°03′07″W
- Country: France
- Overseas collectivity: Saint Martin

Grand Case is a small town on the French side of the island of Saint Martin in the Caribbean. It lies on the Anguilla Channel, on the west coast of the island. Grand Case has a long sandy beach. It is well known for its many restaurants and beach bars. It is the most populous place of the French Saint Martin.

The town has more than two dozen eateries on its mile-long main street.

L'Espérance Airport is adjacent to the town.
