= Ligue de football de Saint-Martin =

Football federation in Saint Martin

CONCACAF
- Founded: 1986
- FIFA affiliation: N/A
- CONCACAF affiliation: 2002 (Associate member), 2013
- President: Aristide Conner
- Website: https://saint-martin.fff.fr/

The Ligue de football de Saint-Martin is the official football federation of the Collectivity of Saint Martin. It became a recognized regional league of the French Football Federation in 2016.

It was originally affiliated to CONCACAF as the Comité de Football des Îles du Nord and included Saint Barthélemy, which now has its own governing body, the Comité de Football de Saint Barthélemy.

== See also ==
- Saint-Martin Championships
- Saint Martin national football team
