= Stade Thelbert Carti =

Association football stadium in Quartier-d'Orleans, Saint Martin

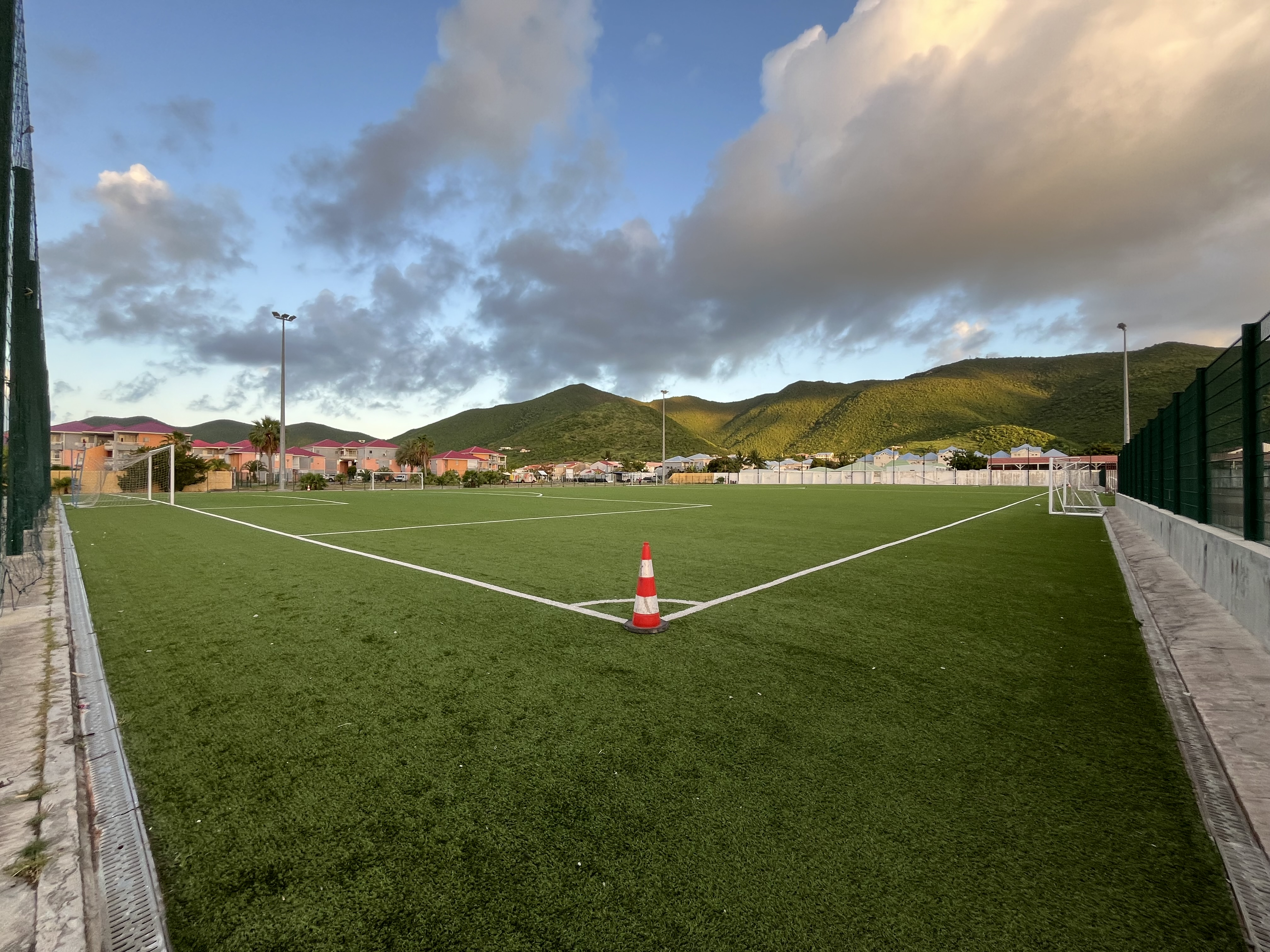
- Interactive map of Stade Thelbert Carti
- Location: Quartier-d'Orleans, Saint Martin
- Coordinates: 18.0666°N 63.0336°W
- Capacity: 2,500
- Surface: artificial turf

Construction
- Opened: October 2016 (reconstructed)
- Renovated: 2018, 2021–2024

Tenants
- Orléans Attackers FC; Saint Martin national football team

The Stade Thelbert Carti is an association football stadium in Quartier-d'Orleans, Saint Martin. It has a capacity of 2,500 spectators and an artificial turf surface. It is home to the Orléans Attackers FC of the Saint-Martin Senior League and has hosted matches of the Saint Martin national football team.

== History ==
The reconstructed stadium was inaugurated in October 2016 after a four-month construction process. When Stade Thelbert Carti opened, as well as football, it hosted rugby union tournaments, with players from the French Top 14 professional club Stade Français attending one. The stadium was almost completely destroyed by Hurricane Irma eleven months later. The Saint Martin government committed €500,000 to restoring the structure. In total, the renovations cost €1,380,000 with the funding being split four ways between a convergence contract, the Collectivity of Saint Martin, the French Football Federation and a separate financial backer. The reconstruction commenced in 2019, though it was delayed in March 2020 as a result of the COVID-19 pandemic in the Collectivity of Saint Martin, though work resumed in May.

In late 2021 a three-phase refurbishment plan was begun on the stadium with the installation of fence around the stadium, installing new lighting at the site, and laying a new synthetic coating on the playing surface. Phases two and three included building a new athletics track, changing rooms, and bleachers, and a structure housing a dojo, fitness room, dance hall, yoga room, and social space.

Demolition work began at the stadium on 6 August 2026 in preparation for rebuilding, that is scheduled to begin in January 2027. At the time, the project was described by association and government officials not as a renovation, but a complete rebuild that will bring the stadium up to CONCACAF standards. The completed project is expected to cost about €15 million and is scheduled be completed within two years.
