= Stade Alberic Richards =

Coordinates: 18°03′42″N 63°05′31″W

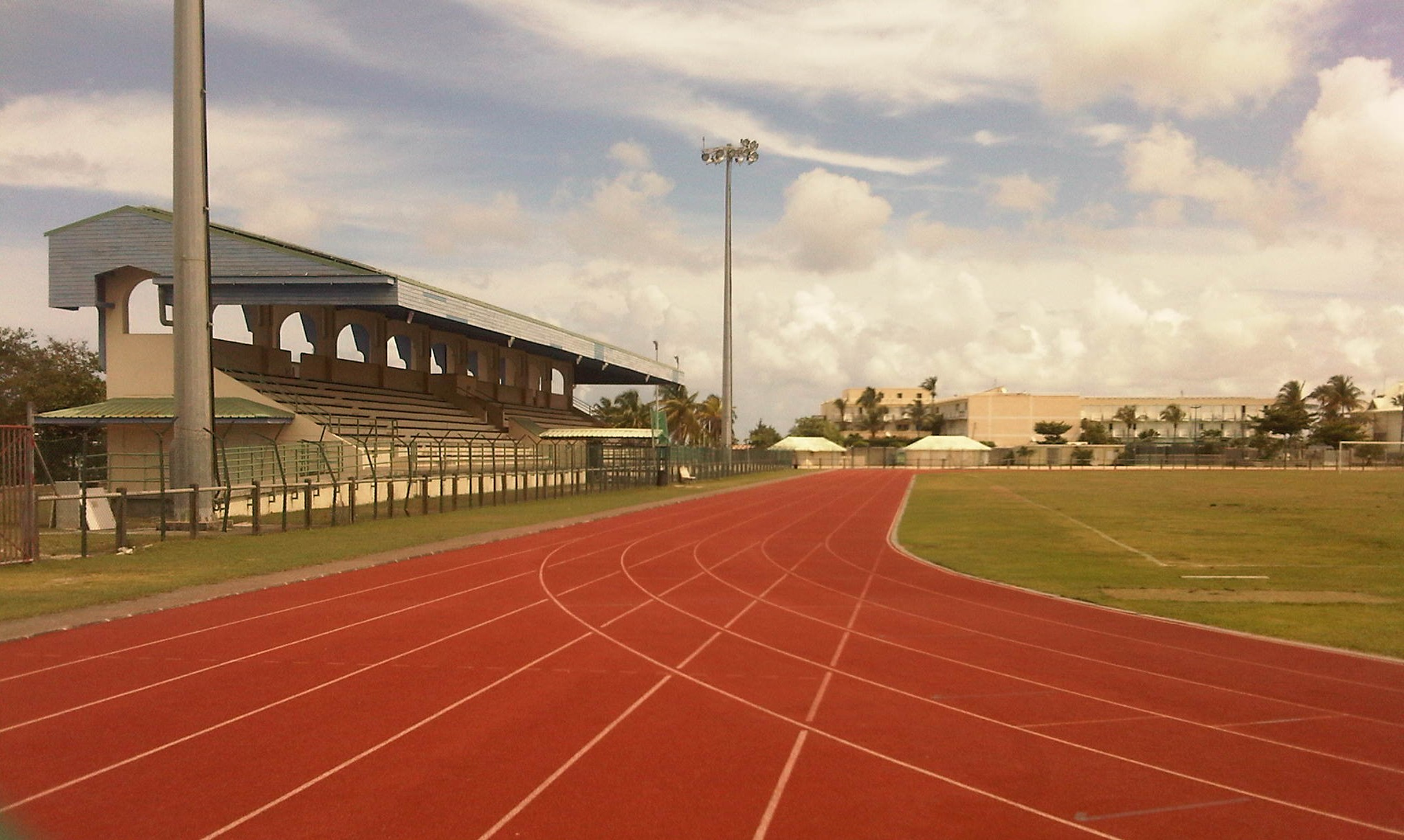
Stade Alberic Richard à Saint-Martin

Stade Alberic Richards is a multi-use stadium in Sandy Ground, Saint Martin. It is currently used mostly for football matches. The stadium holds 2,600 people. The stadium is located on the French side of the island.
