= Sandy Ground, Saint Martin =

Sandy Ground Sol Sableux
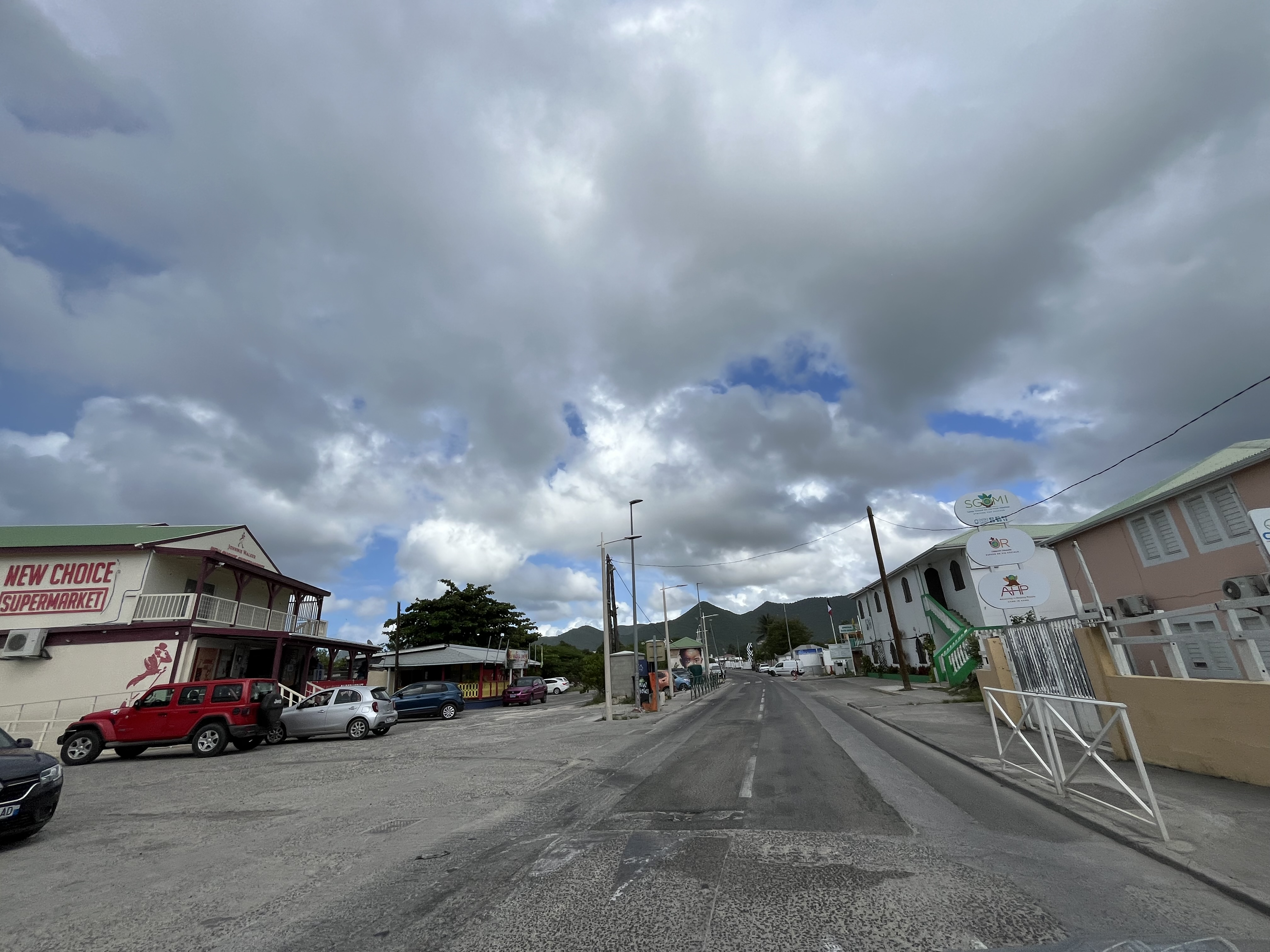
- Sandy Ground

- Location within Saint-Martin
- Coordinates: 18°03′32″N 63°05′49″W
- Country: France
- Overseas collectivity: Saint Martin

Sandy Ground (French: Sol Sableux) is a coastal community on the French side of the Caribbean island of Saint Martin/Sint Maarten.

Sandy Ground is known for its luxury hotels, nature, and beaches.

== Geography ==
It is located on the west coast in the direction of the Lowlands and the Princess Juliana International Airport.

== Hurricane Irma ==
Sandy Ground sustained heavy damage to its infrastructure from Hurricane Irma. This Category 5 hurricane made landfall on the island in September 2017, causing $156 million in damage and killing 15 people.
