= Quartier-d'Orleans =

Quarter of Orleans Quartier-d'Orléans
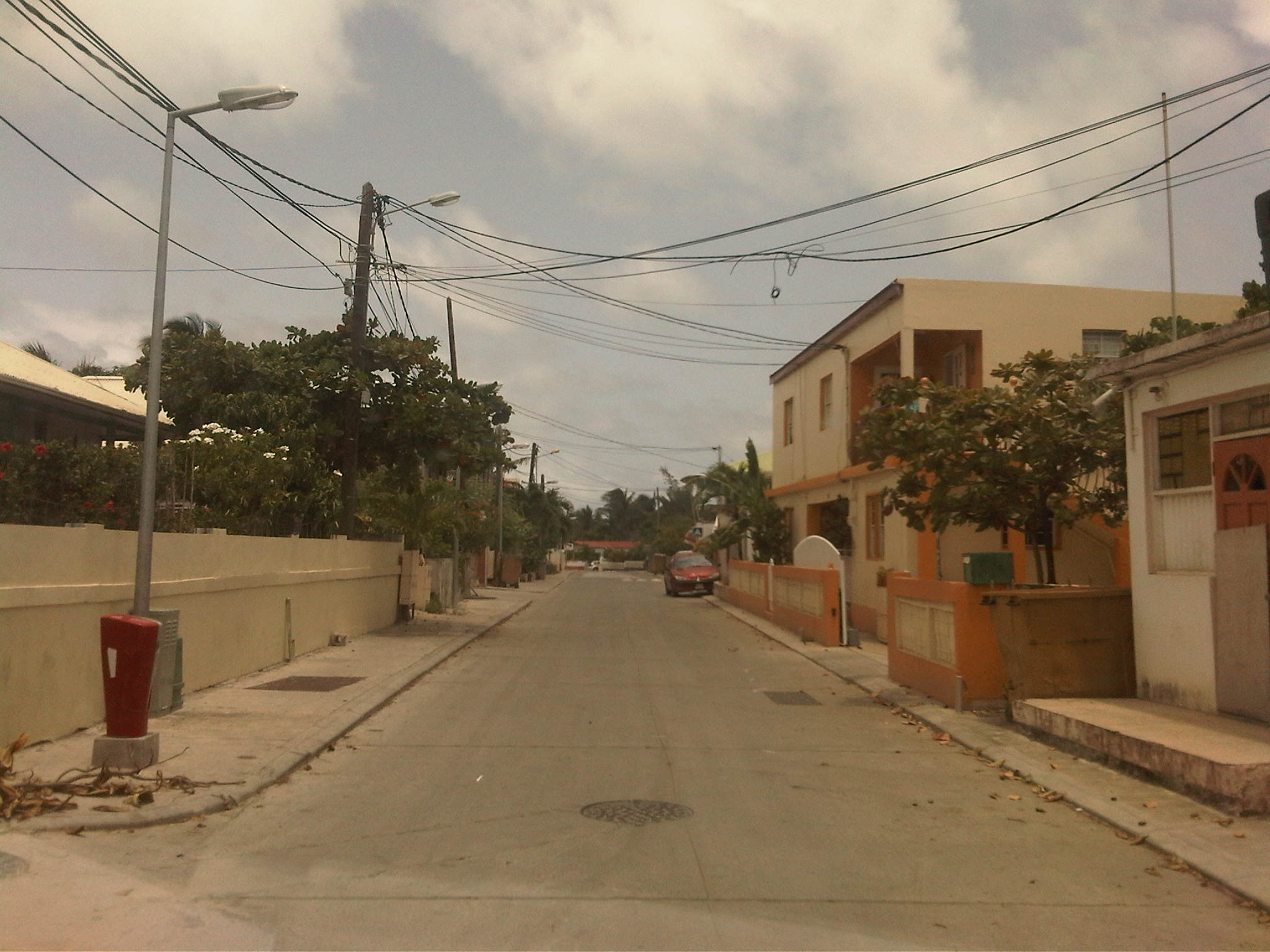

- Location within Saint-Martin
- Coordinates: 18°04′18″N 63°01′58″W
- Country: France
- Overseas collectivity: Saint Martin

Population
  - Total: 5,124 (as of 2,015)

Quartier-d'Orléans (French pronunciation: [kaʁtje dɔʁleɑ̃], lit. 'Quarter of Orleans') is a seaside village on the eastern coast of the island of Saint Martin, on the French side of the Antilles. Lower Prince's Quarter, the largest town on the Dutch side of the island is located 3.5 kilometers south on the N7 road, and Grand Case, the largest beach town on the French side is 6.1 kilometers north of the Quarter on the N7 road. The N7 road continues to Marigot, the French capital on the western coast.

== History ==
The section was originally called Quartier d'Orient, named for the nearby inlet, Orient Bay. The name may have subsequently been changed in honor of the brother of the French King, the Duke of Orléans. The Quarter was the first French settlement on the island, established sometime prior to 1648 next to an indigenous Amerindian village. The French settlers cultivated tobacco, indigo, and (after 1660) sugar cane. The population was in decline during the 19th Century until a surge of economic growth in 1986. Since then, the Quarter of Orleans has rapidly expanded with commercial, residential and tourist areas. With a population of 5,124 people (as of 2015), it is the fourth largest town on the French side of Saint Martin. Still, some areas remain undeveloped and are considered slums.

== Services ==
1. Educational institutions: kindergartens, elementary schools and a public community college.
2. Other public services: post office, police.
3. Sports: Soccer, basketball, volleyball and tennis courts.
4. Places of Worship: three churches.

== Attraction ==
1. The Butterfly Farm (La Ferme des Papillons)
