= Scottish football clubs in international competitions =

Scottish football clubs have participated in European association football competitions since 1955, when Hibernian entered the inaugural European Cup.

Scottish sides have won four UEFA competitions between them, with Celtic becoming the first side from the British Isles to be European champions by winning the 1966–67 European Cup. Rangers (in 1972) and Aberdeen (in 1983) both won the Cup Winners' Cup before its abolition, with Aberdeen going on to become the only Scottish side to win the European Super Cup in the same year as their Cup Winners' Cup triumph.

The most recent appearance by a Scottish club in a European final was the 2022 UEFA Europa League final, when Rangers lost on penalties to German club Eintracht Frankfurt.

A number of non-top flight sides have represented Scotland in European competition, including Gretna and Queen of the South, via their performance in domestic cup competitions. The most recent side from outside the top level of Scottish football to play in European football was Hibernian in 2016–17.

Scottish clubs have never faced off in European tournaments at any stage; the closest this came to occurring was in the 1965–66 Inter-Cities Fairs Cup when Heart of Midlothian lost a playoff to Zaragoza with Dunfermline already drawn to meet the winners in the next round, and in the same competition two years later when, knowing Dundee would be the next opponent, Rangers were eliminated by eventual winners Leeds United.

== Qualification ==
The 2024–25 criteria for Scottish clubs to qualify for European competition are:

Competition	Who qualifies
UEFA Champions League League Stage	1st in Scottish Premiership
UEFA Champions League third qualifying round	2nd in Scottish Premiership
UEFA Europa League play off round	Scottish Cup winners
UEFA Europa League second qualifying round	3rd in Scottish Premiership
UEFA Europa Conference League second qualifying round	4th in Scottish Premiership

If the Scottish Cup winners have already qualified for European football, then 3rd and 4th in the Scottish Premiership move up to take their place and 5th in the Scottish Premiership also qualifies.

=== UEFA Coefficient ===
Year	Position	Coefficient
2000	▲15th	▲20.500
2001	▼16th	▲22.625
2002	▲12th	▲26.125
2003	▲9th	▲30.375
2004	▼11th	▲32.125
2005	▲10th	▼31.750
2006	▼11th	▼30.375
2007	▲10th	▲30.500
2008	10th	▲33.375
2009	▼13th	▼27.875
2010	▼16th	▼25.791
2011	▲15th	▼25.141
2012	▼18th	▼21.141
2013	▼24th	▼15.191
2014	▲23rd	▲16.566
2015	23rd	▲17.725
2016	▼25th	▼17.300
2017	▲23rd	▲18.925
2018	▼26th	▼18.625
2019	▲20th	▲22.125
2020	▲14th	▲27.825
2021	▲11th	▲33.375
2022	▲9th	▲36.900
2023	9th	▼36.400
2024	▼11th	▼36.050
2025	▼16th	▼28.200*

* Season in progress

== Finals ==
Scottish clubs have competed in all three major European finals – twice in the European Cup, four times in the UEFA Cup / UEFA Europa League and four times in the UEFA Cup Winners' Cup.

=== European Cup / Champions League ===
Year	Club	Opponent	Result
1966–67	(Scotland) Celtic	(Italy) Inter Milan	2–1 (N)
1969–70	(Scotland) Celtic	(Netherlands) Feyenoord	1–2 (a.e.t.) (N)

=== UEFA Cup / Europa League ===
Year	Club	Opponent	1st	2nd	Agg
1986–87	(Scotland) Dundee United	(Sweden) IFK Göteborg	0–1 (A)	1–1 (H)	1–2
2002–03	(Scotland) Celtic	(Portugal) Porto	2–3 (a.e.t.) (N)		
2007–08	(Scotland) Rangers	(Russia) Zenit Saint Petersburg	0–2 (N)		
2021–22	(Scotland) Rangers	(Germany) Eintracht Frankfurt	1–1 (a.e.t.) (4–5 p) (N)		

=== Cup Winners' Cup ===
Year	Club	Opponent	1st	2nd	Agg
1960–61	(Scotland) Rangers	(Italy) Fiorentina	0–2 (H)	1–2 (A)	1–4
1966–67	(Scotland) Rangers	(West Germany) Bayern Munich	0–1 (a.e.t.) (N)		
1971–72	(Scotland) Rangers	(Soviet Union) Dynamo Moscow	3–2 (N)		
1982–83	(Scotland) Aberdeen	(Spain) Real Madrid	2–1 (a.e.t.) (N)		

=== Finals at Hampden ===
Six European club finals not involving native clubs have taken place in Scotland; all were held at Hampden Park, and all were won by either a Spanish or a German club. The first, the 1960 European Cup Final, drew the highest ever attendance (127,621) to a UEFA competition final and is also the highest scoring, with Real Madrid running up a 7–3 victory over Eintracht Frankfurt.

Scottish teams were eliminated at the semi-final stage in 1960 (Rangers) and 1966 (Celtic), and on both occasions the Scottish club involved went on to reach the final of a different European competition the following year. Hampden's two finals in the 2000s were also each followed by a Scottish team reaching a European final the next season after even longer waits: a hiatus of 26 years between Scotland hosting such events ended with the 2002 Champions League Final, before Celtic played in the 2003 UEFA Cup final 33 years after their previous showpiece appearance, while the 2007 UEFA Cup final in Glasgow immediately preceded Rangers' appearance in the same tournament in 2008, having waited 36 years since their last final. A similar situation occurred in the early 2020s: the UEFA Euro 2020 international tournament, including four matches at Hampden, was delayed for a year and played in 2021. In the season after that, Rangers reached the 2022 UEFA Europa League Final.

European finals held in Scotland
Competition	Winners	Score	Runners-up	Attendance
1959–60 European Cup	(Spain) Real Madrid	7–3	(West Germany) Eintracht Frankfurt	127,621
1961–62 European Cup Winners' Cup	(Spain) Atlético Madrid	1–1 (Note: Score was 1–1 after extra time, Atlético Madrid won 3–0 in a replay at Neckarstadion, Stuttgart)	(Italy) Fiorentina	29,066
1965–66 European Cup Winners' Cup	(West Germany) Borussia Dortmund	2–1 (Note: Score was 1–1 after 90 minutes, Borussia Dortmund won after extra time.)	(England) Liverpool	41,657
1975–76 European Cup	(West Germany) Bayern Munich	1–0	(France) Saint-Étienne	54,864
2001–02 UEFA Champions League	(Spain) Real Madrid	2–1	(Germany) Bayer Leverkusen	50,499
2006–07 UEFA Cup	(Spain) Sevilla	2–2 (Note: Score was 1–1 after 90 minutes, Sevilla won 3–1 on penalties after extra time)	(Spain) Espanyol	47,602

== Full European record ==
=== European Cup/Champions League ===
European Cup era

Clubs	'56	'57	'58	'59	'60	'61	'62	'63	'64	'65	'66	'67	'68	'69	'70	'71	'72	'73	'74	'75	'76	'77	'78	'79	'80	'81	'82	'83	'84	'85	'86	'87	'88	'89	'90	'91	'92	Total
Celtic	•	•	•	•	•	•	•	•	•	•	•	W	R1	QF	RU	QF	SF	R2	SF	R1	•	•	R2	•	QF	•	R1	R2	•	•	•	R2	•	R2	•	•	•	15
Rangers	•	R1	R1	•	SF	•	QF	•	QR	QF	•	•	•	•	•	•	•	•	•	•	R2	R1	•	QF	•	•	•	•	•	•	•	•	QF	•	R1	R2	R1	13
Aberdeen	•	•	•	•	•	•	•	•	•	•	•	•	•	•	•	•	•	•	•	•	•	•	•	•	•	R2	•	•	•	R1	QF	•	•	•	•	•	•	3
Heart of Midlothian	•	•	•	PR	•	PR	•	•	•	•	•	•	•	•	•	•	•	•	•	•	•	•	•	•	•	•	•	•	•	•	•	•	•	•	•	•	•	2
Dundee	•	•	•	•	•	•	•	SF	•	•	•	•	•	•	•	•	•	•	•	•	•	•	•	•	•	•	•	•	•	•	•	•	•	•	•	•	•	1
Dundee United	•	•	•	•	•	•	•	•	•	•	•	•	•	•	•	•	•	•	•	•	•	•	•	•	•	•	•	•	SF	•	•	•	•	•	•	•	•	1
Hibernian	SF	•	•	•	•	•	•	•	•	•	•	•	•	•	•	•	•	•	•	•	•	•	•	•	•	•	•	•	•	•	•	•	•	•	•	•	•	1
Kilmarnock	•	•	•	•	•	•	•	•	•	•	R1	•	•	•	•	•	•	•	•	•	•	•	•	•	•	•	•	•	•	•	•	•	•	•	•	•	•	1

Champions League era

Clubs	'93	'94	'95	'96	'97	'98	'99	'00	'01	'02	'03	'04	'05	'06	'07	'08	'09	'10	'11	'12	'13	'14	'15	'16	'17	'18	'19	'20	'21	'22	'23	'24	'25	'26	'27	Total
Celtic	•	•	•	•	•	•	Q2	•	•	GS	Q3	GS	GS	Q2	R16	R16	GS	PO	Q3	•	R16	GS	PO	PO	GS	GS	Q3	Q3	Q2	Q2	GS	GS	KPO	PO	PO	26
Rangers	GS	R1	QR	GS	GS	Q2	•	GS	GS	Q3	•	GS	Q3	R16	•	GS	Q2	GS	GS	Q3	•	•	•	•	•	•	•	•	•	Q3	GS	PO	Q3	PO	•	22
Heart of Midlothian	•	•	•	•	•	•	•	•	•	•	•	•	•	•	Q3	•	•	•	•	•	•	•	•	•	•	•	•	•	•	•	•	•	•	•	Q2	2
Motherwell	•	•	•	•	•	•	•	•	•	•	•	•	•	•	•	•	•	•	•	•	Q3	•	•	•	•	•	•	•	•	•	•	•	•	•	•	1

- Club was transferred into the UEFA Cup or Europa League.
- Club progressed into the knockout phase of the Champions League.

=== UEFA Cup/Europa League ===
UEFA Cup era

Club	'72	'73	'74	'75	'76	'77	'78	'79	'80	'81	'82	'83	'84	'85	'86	'87	'88	'89	'90	'91	'92	'93	'94	'95	'96	'97	'98	'99	'00	'01	'02	'03	'04	'05	'06	'07	'08	'09	Total
Aberdeen	R2	R1	R2	•	•	•	R1	R1	R1	•	R3	•	•	•	•	•	R2	R1	R1	•	R1	•	•	QR	•	R2	•	•	•	QR	•	R1	•	•	•	•	R32	•	16
Dundee United	•	•	•	•	R2	•	R1	R1	R2	R2	QF	QF	•	R3	R3	RU	R2	•	R2	R2	•	•	R1	•	•	•	Q2	•	•	•	•	•	•	•	Q2	•	•	•	16
Celtic	•	•	•	•	•	R1	•	•	•	•	•	•	R3	•	•	•	R1	•	•	•	R2	R2	R2	•	•	R2	R1	R2	R2	R2	R3	RU	QF	•	•	•	•	•	14
Rangers	•	•	•	•	•	•	•	•	•	•	•	R2	•	R2	R1	R3	•	R2	•	•	•	•	•	•	•	•	R1	R3	R3	R3	R4	R1	•	GS	•	R4	RU	•	14
Heart of Midlothian	•	•	•	•	•	•	•	•	•	•	•	•	•	R1	•	R1	•	QF	•	R2	•	R2	R1	•	•	•	•	•	•	R1	•	•	R2	GS	•	R1	•	•	10
Hibernian	•	•	R2	R2	R1	R2	•	R2	•	•	•	•	•	•	•	•	•	•	R2	•	•	R1	•	•	•	•	•	•	•	•	R1	•	•	•	R1	•	•	•	9
Dundee	R3	•	R1	R1	•	•	•	•	•	•	•	•	•	•	•	•	•	•	•	•	•	•	•	•	•	•	•	•	•	•	•	•	R1	•	•	•	•	•	4
Kilmarnock	•	•	•	•	•	•	•	•	•	•	•	•	•	•	•	•	•	•	•	•	•	•	•	•	•	•	•	Q2	R1	•	R1	•	•	•	•	•	•	•	3
Motherwell	•	•	•	•	•	•	•	•	•	•	•	•	•	•	•	•	•	•	•	•	•	•	•	R1	PR	•	•	•	•	•	•	•	•	•	•	•	•	R1	3
St Mirren	•	•	•	•	•	•	•	•	•	R2	•	•	R1	•	R2	•	•	•	•	•	•	•	•	•	•	•	•	•	•	•	•	•	•	•	•	•	•	•	3
Dunfermline	•	•	•	•	•	•	•	•	•	•	•	•	•	•	•	•	•	•	•	•	•	•	•	•	•	•	•	•	•	•	•	•	•	Q2	•	•	Q2	•	2
St Johnstone	R3	•	•	•	•	•	•	•	•	•	•	•	•	•	•	•	•	•	•	•	•	•	•	•	•	•	•	•	R1	•	•	•	•	•	•	•	•	•	2
Gretna	•	•	•	•	•	•	•	•	•	•	•	•	•	•	•	•	•	•	•	•	•	•	•	•	•	•	•	•	•	•	•	•	•	•	•	Q2	•	•	1
Livingston	•	•	•	•	•	•	•	•	•	•	•	•	•	•	•	•	•	•	•	•	•	•	•	•	•	•	•	•	•	•	•	R1	•	•	•	•	•	•	1
Partick Thistle	•	R1	•	•	•	•	•	•	•	•	•	•	•	•	•	•	•	•	•	•	•	•	•	•	•	•	•	•	•	•	•	•	•	•	•	•	•	•	1
Queen of the South	•	•	•	•	•	•	•	•	•	•	•	•	•	•	•	•	•	•	•	•	•	•	•	•	•	•	•	•	•	•	•	•	•	•	•	•	•	Q2	1
Raith Rovers	•	•	•	•	•	•	•	•	•	•	•	•	•	•	•	•	•	•	•	•	•	•	•	•	R2	•	•	•	•	•	•	•	•	•	•	•	•	•	1

Europa League era

Club	'10	'11	'12	'13	'14	'15	'16	'17	'18	'19	'20	'21	'22	'23	'24	'25	'26	Total
Celtic	GS	PO	GS	•	•	R32	GS	•	R32	R32	R32	GS	GS	•	•	•	KPO	11
Aberdeen	Q3	•	•	•	•	Q3	Q3	Q3	Q3	Q2	Q3	Q3	•	•	PO	•	PO	10
Rangers	•	R16	PO	•	•	•	•	•	Q1	GS	R16	R16	RU	•	R16	QF	GS	10
Motherwell	Q3	PO	•	PO	Q3	Q2	•	•	•	•	•	Q3	•	•	•	•	•	6
St Johnstone	•	•	•	Q2	Q3	Q3	Q1	•	Q1	•	•	•	Q3	•	•	•	•	6
Heart of Midlothian	PO	•	PO	PO	•	•	•	Q2	•	•	•	•	•	PO	•	PO	•	5
Hibernian	•	Q3	•	•	Q2	•	•	Q2	•	Q3	•	•	•	•	•	•	Q2	5
Dundee United	•	PO	Q2	Q3	•	•	•	•	•	•	•	•	•	•	•	•	•	3
Kilmarnock	•	•	•	•	•	•	•	•	•	•	Q1	•	•	•	•	Q2	•	2
Falkirk	Q2	•	•	•	•	•	•	•	•	•	•	•	•	•	•	•	•	1
Inverness Caledonian Thistle	•	•	•	•	•	•	Q2	•	•	•	•	•	•	•	•	•	•	1

- Club was transferred into the Europa League knockout phase after finishing third in their Champions League group.
- Club was transferred into the Europa Conference League.
- Club progressed from the group stage of the Europa League into the knockout phase of the Europa League.

=== Conference League ===
Conference League

Club	'22	'23	'24	'25	'26	Total
Aberdeen	PO	•	GS	•	LP	3
Heart of Midlothian	•	GS	PO	LP	•	3
Hibernian	Q3	•	PO	•	Q3	3
Dundee United	•	Q3	•	•	Q3	2
Celtic	KPO	•	•	•	•	1
Motherwell	•	Q2	•	•	•	1
Kilmarnock	•	•	•	PO	•	1
St Mirren	•	•	•	Q3	•	1

- Club was transferred into the Conference League from the Europa League.
- Club progressed from the group stage of the Conference League into the knockout phase of the Conference League.

=== Intertoto Cup ===
Between 1995 and 2008, UEFA ran the Intertoto Cup, a summer competition for sides that had not qualified for the other European competitions with the sides progressing the furthest qualifying for the UEFA Cup (it had operated independently since the 1960s, but no clubs from Scotland – among other nations – took part in that era). Scottish clubs were only involved five times, with Hibernian being the closest side to qualify for the UEFA Cup through this tournament, losing on away goals in the 2006 edition. The competition was abolished in 2008, with sides who would have entered the competition entering the UEFA Europa League instead.

Club	'95	'96	'97	'98	'99	'00	'01	'02	'03	'04	'05	'06	'07	'08	Total
Hibernian	•	•	•	•	•	•	•	•	•	R2	•	R3	•	R2	3
Dundee	•	•	•	•	•	•	R1	•	•	•	•	•	•	•	1
Partick Thistle	GS	•	•	•	•	•	•	•	•	•	•	•	•	•	1

=== Cup Winners' Cup ===
A single Scottish club was entered into the UEFA Cup Winners' Cup throughout its history – usually the winners of the Scottish Cup. In years in which the Scottish Cup holders had already qualified for the European Cup or Champions League, the other finalist would be entered in their place. For the 1983–84 edition, two Scottish sides were entered – Rangers as Scottish Cup runners-up and Aberdeen as the holders of the competition (and the Scottish Cup). The Cup Winners' Cup was merged with the UEFA Cup in 1999.

Club	'61	'62	'63	'64	'65	'66	'67	'68	'69	'70	'71	'72	'73	'74	'75	'76	'77	'78	'79	'80	'81	'82	'83	'84	'85	'86	'87	'88	'89	'90	'91	'92	'93	'94	'95	'96	'97	'98	'99	Total
Rangers	RU	•	R1	•	•	•	RU	•	•	R2	•	W	•	R2	•	•	•	R1	•	R2	•	R1	•	R2	•	•	•	•	•	•	•	•	•	•	•	•	•	•	•	10
Aberdeen	•	•	•	•	•	•	•	R2	•	•	R1	•	•	•	•	•	•	•	R2	•	•	•	W	SF	•	•	R1	•	•	•	R2	•	•	R2	•	•	•	•	•	8
Celtic	•	•	•	SF	•	SF	•	•	•	•	•	•	•	•	•	QF	•	•	•	•	R1	•	•	•	R2	R1	•	•	•	R1	•	•	•	•	•	R2	•	•	•	8
Dundee United	•	•	•	•	•	•	•	•	•	•	•	•	•	•	R2	•	•	•	•	•	•	•	•	•	•	•	•	•	R2	•	•	•	•	•	R1	•	•	•	•	3
Heart of Midlothian	•	•	•	•	•	•	•	•	•	•	•	•	•	•	•	•	R2	•	•	•	•	•	•	•	•	•	•	•	•	•	•	•	•	•	•	•	QR	•	R1	3
Dunfermline Athletic	•	QF	•	•	•	•	•	•	SF	•	•	•	•	•	•	•	•	•	•	•	•	•	•	•	•	•	•	•	•	•	•	•	•	•	•	•	•	•	•	2
Airdrieonians	•	•	•	•	•	•	•	•	•	•	•	•	•	•	•	•	•	•	•	•	•	•	•	•	•	•	•	•	•	•	•	•	R1	•	•	•	•	•	•	1
Dundee	•	•	•	•	R2	•	•	•	•	•	•	•	•	•	•	•	•	•	•	•	•	•	•	•	•	•	•	•	•	•	•	•	•	•	•	•	•	•	•	1
Hibernian	•	•	•	•	•	•	•	•	•	•	•	•	QF	•	•	•	•	•	•	•	•	•	•	•	•	•	•	•	•	•	•	•	•	•	•	•	•	•	•	1
Kilmarnock	•	•	•	•	•	•	•	•	•	•	•	•	•	•	•	•	•	•	•	•	•	•	•	•	•	•	•	•	•	•	•	•	•	•	•	•	•	R1	•	1
Motherwell	•	•	•	•	•	•	•	•	•	•	•	•	•	•	•	•	•	•	•	•	•	•	•	•	•	•	•	•	•	•	•	R1	•	•	•	•	•	•	•	1
St Mirren	•	•	•	•	•	•	•	•	•	•	•	•	•	•	•	•	•	•	•	•	•	•	•	•	•	•	•	R2	•	•	•	•	•	•	•	•	•	•	•	1

=== Super Cup ===
Only two Scottish clubs have competed in the UEFA Super Cup since its creation, with Rangers and Aberdeen both competing as winners of the Cup Winners' Cup.

Year	Club	Opponent	1st	2nd	Agg.
1972	(Scotland) Rangers	(Netherlands) Ajax	1–3 (H)	2–3 (A)	3–6 (Note: The 1972 final is not recognised by UEFA as an official title)
1983	(Scotland) Aberdeen	(West Germany) Hamburger SV	0–0 (A)	2–0 (H)	2–0

=== Final appearance by competition ===
Competition	Winners	Runners-up	Total
European Cup / UEFA Champions League	1	1	2
UEFA Cup Winners' Cup	2	2	4
UEFA Cup / UEFA Europa League	0	4	4
UEFA Super Cup	1	1	2
Total	4	8	12

=== Inter-Cities Fairs Cup ===
The Inter-Cities Fairs Cup, set up to promote international trade fairs, was played between 1955 and 1971, although no Scottish teams entered until the 1960–61 edition which was the first to be completed over a single season. The competition was initially only open to teams from cities that hosted trade fairs and where these teams finished in their national league had no relevance, therefore the number of entrants varied each year, and at times was restricted to one per city (Clyde were denied entry to the 1967–68 competition when they finished in 3rd place in the Scottish League, as Rangers finished above them and were given the single Fairs Cup place for Glasgow; the Bully Wee never played in Europe). After 1968, it was sometimes referred to as the Runners-up Cup, with teams now qualifying based on league position. In 1971, it came under the auspices of UEFA and was replaced by the UEFA Cup. UEFA does not consider clubs' records in the Fairs Cup to be part of their European record; however, FIFA does view the competition as a major honour.

No Scottish team reached the final of the Fairs Cup, although four different clubs reached the semi-finals, including Kilmarnock in 1966–67, the same season as Celtic and Rangers both reached the finals of the other continental tournaments and Scotland defeated England at Wembley. It was Leeds United who ended Kilmarnock's dream, and in the following 1967–68 edition, the Yorkshire club eliminated three Scottish teams in successive rounds on their way to winning the cup – Hibernian in Round Three (2–1 on aggregate), Rangers in the quarter-final (2–0) and Dundee in the semi-final (2–1). The next year, Rangers made the semi-final but again were eliminated by an English opponent who went on to lift the trophy, this time Newcastle United.

Club	'58	'60	'61	'62	'63	'64	'65	'66	'67	'68	'69	'70	'71	Total
Hibernian	•	•	SF	R2	QF	•	•	R1	•	R3	R3	•	R3	7
Kilmarnock	•	•	•	•	•	•	R2	•	SF	•	•	R3	R1	4
Dunfermline Athletic	•	•	•	•	R2	•	R3	•	R2	•	•	R3	•	4
Rangers	•	•	•	•	•	•	•	•	•	QF	SF	•	R1	3
Dundee United	•	•	•	•	•	•	•	•	R3	•	•	R1	R2	3
Heart of Midlothian	•	•	•	R2	•	R1	•	R3	•	•	•	•	•	3
Celtic	•	•	•	•	R1	•	R2	•	•	•	•	•	•	2
Dundee	•	•	•	•	•	•	•	•	•	SF	•	•	•	1
Partick Thistle	•	•	•	•	•	R2	•	•	•	•	•	•	•	1
Aberdeen	•	•	•	•	•	•	•	•	•	•	R2	•	•	1
Morton	•	•	•	•	•	•	•	•	•	•	R1	•	•	1

=== Overall club record ===
As of 1 June 2024

Club	Pld	W	D	L	GF	GA	GD	W%	Pts	P/G
Aberdeen	158	63	42	53	239	187	+52	39.87	231	1.46
Airdrieonians	2	0	0	2	1	3	−2	0.00	0	0.00
Celtic	416	186	76	154	634	514	+120	44.71	634	1.52
Dundee	34	16	3	15	63	50	+13	47.06	51	1.50
Dundee United	112	47	30	35	169	123	+46	41.96	171	1.53
Dunfermline	46	23	7	16	87	51	+36	50.00	76	1.65
Falkirk	2	1	0	1	1	2	−1	50.00	3	1.50
Greenock Morton	2	0	0	2	3	9	−6	0.00	0	0.00
Gretna	2	0	1	1	3	7	−4	0.00	1	0.50
Heart of Midlothian	92	33	18	41	117	140	−23	35.87	117	1.27
Hibernian	106	46	21	39	181	166	+15	43.40	159	1.50
Inverness Caledonian Thistle	2	0	1	1	0	1	−1	0.00	1	0.50
Kilmarnock	42	15	9	18	52	62	−10	35.71	54	1.29
Livingston	4	1	2	1	7	9	−2	25.00	5	1.25
Motherwell	35	10	3	22	43	51	−8	28.57	33	0.94
Partick Thistle	10	4	1	5	16	17	−1	40.00	13	1.30
Queen of the South	2	0	0	2	2	4	−2	0.00	0	0.00
Raith Rovers	6	2	1	3	10	8	+2	33.33	7	1.17
Rangers	397	165	103	129	585	488	+97	41.56	597	1.50
St Johnstone	28	7	9	12	29	38	−9	25.00	30	1.07
St Mirren	14	3	5	6	10	14	−4	21.43	14	1.00
Total	1,476	613	321	542	2,201	1,873	+328	41.53	2,160	1.46

== Intercontinental Cup ==
Before being supplanted by the FIFA Club World Cup, the now defunct Intercontinental Cup served as a de facto annual world club championship contested by the European and South American club champions. The only Scottish side to have competed in the competition was Celtic in 1967, following their European Cup win.

Year	Club	Opponent	1st	2nd	PO
1967	(Scotland) Celtic	(Argentina) Racing Club	1–0 (H)	1–2 (A)	0–1 (N)

== Scottish Challenge Cup ==
The 2016–17 Scottish Challenge Cup saw the addition of four non-Scottish league sides for the first time. The competition, usually involving sides from the national divisions below the top flight, introduced top two teams from the Welsh Premier League and Northern Ireland's NIFL Premiership entered the competition in the fourth round. Welsh champions The New Saints progressed furthest of the four, being defeated in the semi-finals by St Mirren. The 2017–18 competition saw two League of Ireland sides compete along with two from Wales and Northern Ireland. This time the guest teams entered in the second round, with TNS and Crusaders both reaching the semi-finals. The 2018–19 edition was expanded again, this time to include two teams from the English fifth tier National League along with the teams from the other Celtic nations.

== See also ==
- List of football matches between British clubs in UEFA competitions
- Progrès Niederkorn 2–0 Rangers (2017)
- Lincoln Red Imps 1–0 Celtic (2016)
- The Bhoys from Seville (2003)
- 2008 UEFA Cup final riots
- Lisbon Lions (1967)
