= Irish derby (football) =

Football rivalry in Ireland

- Location: Ireland (UEFA)
- Teams: Northern Ireland; Republic of Ireland
- First meeting: Republic 0–0 Northern (20 September 1978); UEFA Euro 1980 qualifying
- Latest meeting: Republic 0–0 Northern (15 November 2018); Friendly

Statistics
- Total meetings: 11
- Most wins: Republic of Ireland (4)
- Most player appearances: (Republic of Ireland) Tony Cascarino (8 apps)
- Top scorer: (Republic of Ireland) Robbie Keane (Republic of Ireland) Andy Townsend (Republic of Ireland) Niall Quinn (2 goals)
- All-time record: Republic: 4 Draw: 5 Northern: 2
- Largest victory: Republic 5–0 Northern (24 May 2011); Friendly
- Largest goal scoring: Republic 5–0 Northern (24 May 2011); Friendly

The Irish derby is a term given to football matches between Northern Ireland and Republic of Ireland. A total of 11 matches has been played with Republic of Ireland winning four as compared to Northern Ireland's two wins and five matches ending in a draw.

== History ==
The rivalry started in the second half of the 19th century, as the sport was becoming popular on the island of Ireland, but due to it being most favoured among the Ulster Protestants community, the Irish Football Association was set up in Belfast rather than the capital city of Dublin. The Association was also biased towards Northern players: between its formation in 1882 and 1921, only 75 southern players were capped for the IFA's Ireland team compared to 798 from the north. Following the partition of Ireland, the Dublin-based Football Association of Ireland was established along with its own national side. Both bodies initially selected players from across the island with little problem (unlike the FAI team, the IFA side was not affiliated to FIFA and continued to take part in the British Home Championship). However, after the Home Nations rejoined FIFA after the Second World War, the 1950 FIFA World Cup qualification process involved both Ireland teams, and the FAI complained when the IFA selected four southern players, leading to FIFA ruling that the teams could only select players from their own part of the island, and neither could be referred to as simply 'Ireland': from then on they were referred to as the Northern Ireland national football team and Republic of Ireland national football team, although the former continued to call themselves Ireland in the British Home Championship until the 1970s.

While attempts have been made to encourage a friendlier relationship between the teams and their communities in the wake of the 1998 Good Friday Agreement which did much to bring an end to the 30-year sectarian armed conflict in Northern Ireland, one aspect of that agreement has led to further sporting tension: citizens of Northern Ireland can classify as British or Irish, and several players raised in the North, including some who featured for Northern Ireland at youth and senior levels, have opted to play internationally for the Republic of Ireland, frustrating the selectors in Belfast who already have a limited pool of talent (a population of under two million – less than half of the Republic – and a smaller diaspora in Britain) to choose from.

== List of matches ==
No.	Date	Venue	Competition	Result		
1	20 September 1978	(Republic of Ireland) Dublin	UEFA Euro 1980 qualifying	Republic of Ireland	0–0	Northern Ireland
2	21 November 1979	(Northern Ireland) Belfast	UEFA Euro 1980 qualifying	Northern Ireland	1–0	Republic of Ireland
3	14 September 1988	(Northern Ireland) Belfast	1990 FIFA World Cup qualification	Northern Ireland	0–0	Republic of Ireland
4	11 October 1989	(Republic of Ireland) Dublin	1990 FIFA World Cup qualification	Republic of Ireland	3–0	Northern Ireland
5	31 March 1993	(Republic of Ireland) Dublin	1994 FIFA World Cup qualification	Republic of Ireland	3–0	Northern Ireland
6	17 November 1993	(Northern Ireland) Belfast	1994 FIFA World Cup qualification	Northern Ireland	1–1	Republic of Ireland
7	16 November 1994	(Northern Ireland) Belfast	UEFA Euro 1996 qualifying	Northern Ireland	0–4	Republic of Ireland
8	29 March 1995	(Republic of Ireland) Dublin	UEFA Euro 1996 qualifying	Republic of Ireland	1–1	Northern Ireland
9	29 May 1999	(Republic of Ireland) Dublin	Friendly	Republic of Ireland	0–1	Northern Ireland
10	24 May 2011	(Republic of Ireland) Dublin	2011 Nations Cup	Republic of Ireland	5–0	Northern Ireland
11	15 November 2018	(Republic of Ireland) Dublin	Friendly	Republic of Ireland	0–0	Northern Ireland

== Statistics ==
=== All-time most appearances ===
Nation	Player	Appearances	Position
(Republic of Ireland)	Tony Cascarino	8	Striker
(Republic of Ireland)	Niall Quinn	7	Striker
(Republic of Ireland)	Paul McGrath	7	Defender
(Republic of Ireland)	Andy Townsend	7	Midfielder
(Republic of Ireland)	Denis Irwin	6	Defender
(Republic of Ireland)	Roy Keane	6	Midfielder
(Republic of Ireland)	Ray Houghton	6	Midfielder
(Northern Ireland)	Iain Dowie	5	Striker
(Northern Ireland)	Nigel Worthington	5	Midfielder/Defender
(Republic of Ireland)	Caoimhín Kelleher	5	Goalkeeper
(Republic of Ireland)	John Aldridge	5	Striker
(Republic of Ireland)	Steve Staunton	5	Defender

== Matches between club sides ==
Club sides from Northern Ireland and the Republic of Ireland first met in European competition when Glentoran and Waterford were drawn against each other in the first round of the 1970–71 European Cup. Following that first meeting, clubs from either side of the Irish border have been drawn against each other a number of times, usually in the early stages of UEFA competitions. However, in the league phase of the 2024–25 UEFA Conference League, Larne's meeting with Shamrock Rovers became the first time clubs from Northern Ireland and the Republic of Ireland had played each other in the group stage of a European competition. In July 2025, Shelbourne and Linfield were drawn against each other in the first qualifying round of the Champions League, with Shelbourne winning the two-legged tie, and Linfield dropping into the Conference League. Just over a month later, the two sides faced each other again, this time in the play-off round of the Conference League, with the Irish side again progressing.

Season	Round	Flag	Team 1	Score	Team 2	Flag	Venue	Attendance	Win for
European Cup / UEFA Champions League
1970–71	First round	(Northern Ireland)	Glentoran	1–3	Waterford	(Republic of Ireland)	The Oval, Belfast	8,000	(Republic of Ireland)
1970–71	First round	(Republic of Ireland)	Waterford	1–0	Glentoran	(Northern Ireland)	Kilcohan Park, Waterford	6,000	(Republic of Ireland)
1979–80	Preliminary round	(Republic of Ireland)	Dundalk	1–1	Linfield	(Northern Ireland)	Oriel Park, Dundalk	5,000	(Republic of Ireland)
1979–80	Preliminary round	(Northern Ireland)	Linfield	0–2	Dundalk	(Republic of Ireland)	Haarlem Stadion, Haarlem	1,147	(Republic of Ireland)
1984–85	First round	(Northern Ireland)	Linfield	0–0	Shamrock Rovers	(Republic of Ireland)	Windsor Park, Belfast	4,907	(Northern Ireland)
1984–85	First round	(Republic of Ireland)	Shamrock Rovers	1–1(a)	Linfield	(Northern Ireland)	Glenmalure Park, Dublin	2,200	(Northern Ireland)
2005–06	First qualifying round	(Northern Ireland)	Glentoran	1–2	Shelbourne	(Republic of Ireland)	The Oval, Belfast	2,810	(Republic of Ireland)
2005–06	First qualifying round	(Republic of Ireland)	Shelbourne	4–1	Glentoran	(Northern Ireland)	Tolka Park, Dublin	4,500	(Republic of Ireland)
2025–26	First qualifying round	(Republic of Ireland)	Shelbourne	1–0	Linfield	(Northern Ireland)	Tolka Park, Dublin	3,655	(Republic of Ireland)
2025–26	First qualifying round	(Northern Ireland)	Linfield	1–1	Shelbourne	(Republic of Ireland)	Windsor Park, Belfast	7,137	(Republic of Ireland)
UEFA Cup / UEFA Europa League
2016–17	First qualifying round	(Northern Ireland)	Linfield	0–1	Cork City	(Republic of Ireland)	Windsor Park, Belfast	2,093	(Republic of Ireland)
2016–17	First qualifying round	(Republic of Ireland)	Cork City	1–1	Linfield	(Northern Ireland)	Turners Cross, Cork	3,521	(Republic of Ireland)
UEFA Conference League
2024–25	League Phase	(Northern Ireland)	Larne	1–4	Shamrock Rovers	(Republic of Ireland)	Windsor Park, Belfast	5,439	(Republic of Ireland)
2025–26	Play-off round	(Republic of Ireland)	Shelbourne	3–1	Linfield	(Northern Ireland)	Tolka Park, Dublin	3,655	(Republic of Ireland)
2025–26	Play-off round	(Northern Ireland)	Linfield	0–2	Shelbourne	(Republic of Ireland)	Windsor Park, Belfast	5,200	(Republic of Ireland)

== See also ==
- List of football matches between British clubs in UEFA competitions
- List of football matches between British national teams
