= List of football matches between British national teams =

The men's national football teams of the four Home Nations of the United Kingdom have played each other more times than any other footballing nations in the world. The world's first international football match was played between Scotland and England in Glasgow in 1872 (a 0–0 draw). From then on, all four teams started playing regular friendlies against each other. In 1883 a formal competition between the UK's teams, the British Home Championship, was introduced, guaranteeing that each team would play the other three at least once a season. The Championship was discontinued in 1984, partly due to problems of crowd trouble, and partly due to the desire of England (and to a lesser extent Scotland) to contest international fixtures against larger and more powerful nations.

While the British Home Championship was being played, the UK teams were also drawn together on a number of occasions during qualification competitions for the FIFA World Cup and UEFA European Championship. Early tournaments simply used the British Championship as a qualifying group, but during qualification for the 1974 World Cup, England and Wales were drawn in the same group. Subsequent to this, three more qualification tournaments saw UK teams drawn together while the British Championship was being played. Since the end of the British Home Championship, the teams have played each other mainly when drawn together in international competitions such as the European Championship or the World Cup, with occasional friendly fixtures.

At men's major national tournaments, Home Nations teams have met four times at the UEFA European Championships and once at FIFA World Cups. At UEFA Euro 2016 (held in France) during the Group Stage England and Wales contested the first match played between home nations outside of UK and Ireland, with England winning the match 2-1 with a last minute winner from Daniel Sturridge. England and Wales played the first ever Home Nations tie at a World Cup when they played each other at the 2022 FIFA World Cup in Qatar, with England winning the match 3–0. This match is also the only occasion to date that two of the home nations have played each other in a football match held outside of the European continent.

Teams –

- England
- Northern Ireland (as Ireland between 1882 and 1950)
- Scotland
- Wales

== FIFA World Cup ==
| Date | Competition | | Score | | Venue | Notes |
|---|---|---|---|---|---|---|
| 1 October 1949 | 1950 FIFA World Cup qualifying | Ireland | 2–8 | Scotland | (Northern Ireland) Windsor Park, Belfast | (Note: Also 1950 British Home Championship) |
| 15 October 1949 | 1950 FIFA World Cup qualifying | Wales | 1–4 | England | (Wales) Ninian Park, Cardiff | |
| 9 November 1949 | 1950 FIFA World Cup qualifying | Scotland | 2–0 | Wales | (Scotland) Hampden Park, Glasgow | |
| 16 November 1949 | 1950 FIFA World Cup qualifying | England | 9–2 | Ireland | (England) Maine Road, Manchester | |
| 8 March 1950 | 1950 FIFA World Cup qualifying | Wales | 0–0 | Ireland | (Wales) Racecourse Ground, Wrexham | |
| 15 April 1950 | 1950 FIFA World Cup qualifying | Scotland | 0–1 | England | (Scotland) Hampden Park, Glasgow | |
| 3 October 1953 | 1954 FIFA World Cup qualifying | Northern Ireland | 1–3 | Scotland | (Northern Ireland) Windsor Park, Belfast | (Note: Also 1954 British Home Championship) |
| 10 October 1953 | 1954 FIFA World Cup qualifying | Wales | 1–4 | England | (Wales) Ninian Park, Cardiff | |
| 4 November 1953 | 1954 FIFA World Cup qualifying | Scotland | 3–3 | Wales | (Scotland) Hampden Park, Glasgow | |
| 11 November 1953 | 1954 FIFA World Cup qualifying | England | 3–1 | Northern Ireland | (England) Goodison Park, Liverpool | |
| 31 March 1954 | 1954 FIFA World Cup qualifying | Wales | 1–2 | Northern Ireland | (Wales) Racecourse Ground, Wrexham | |
| 3 April 1954 | 1954 FIFA World Cup qualifying | Scotland | 2–4 | England | (Scotland) Hampden Park, Glasgow | |
| 15 November 1972 | 1974 FIFA World Cup qualifying | Wales | 0–1 | England | (Wales) Ninian Park, Cardiff | |
| 24 January 1973 | 1974 FIFA World Cup qualifying | England | 1–1 | Wales | (England) Wembley Stadium (I), London | |
| 17 November 1976 | 1978 FIFA World Cup qualifying | Scotland | 1–0 | Wales | (Scotland) Hampden Park, Glasgow | |
| 12 October 1977 | 1978 FIFA World Cup qualifying | Wales | 0–2 | Scotland | (England) Anfield, Liverpool | |
| 25 March 1981 | 1982 FIFA World Cup qualifying | Scotland | 1–1 | Northern Ireland | (Scotland) Hampden Park, Glasgow | |
| 14 October 1981 | 1982 FIFA World Cup qualifying | Northern Ireland | 0–0 | Scotland | (Northern Ireland) Windsor Park, Belfast | |
| 27 February 1985 | 1986 FIFA World Cup qualifying | Northern Ireland | 0–1 | England | (Northern Ireland) Windsor Park, Belfast | |
| 27 March 1985 | 1986 FIFA World Cup qualifying | Scotland | 0–1 | Wales | (Scotland) Hampden Park, Glasgow | |
| 10 September 1985 | 1986 FIFA World Cup qualifying | Wales | 1–1 | Scotland | (Wales) Ninian Park, Cardiff | |
| 13 November 1985 | 1986 FIFA World Cup qualifying | England | 0–0 | Northern Ireland | (England) Wembley Stadium (I), London | |
| 8 September 2004 | 2006 FIFA World Cup qualifying | Wales | 2–2 | Northern Ireland | (Wales) Millennium Stadium, Cardiff | |
| 9 October 2004 | 2006 FIFA World Cup qualifying | England | 2–0 | Wales | (England) Old Trafford, Manchester | |
| 26 March 2005 | 2006 FIFA World Cup qualifying | England | 4–0 | Northern Ireland | (England) Old Trafford, Manchester | |
| 3 September 2005 | 2006 FIFA World Cup qualifying | Wales | 0–1 | England | (Wales) Millennium Stadium, Cardiff | |
| 7 September 2005 | 2006 FIFA World Cup qualifying | Northern Ireland | 1–0 | England | (Northern Ireland) Windsor Park, Belfast | |
| 8 October 2005 | 2006 FIFA World Cup qualifying | Northern Ireland | 2–3 | Wales | (Northern Ireland) Windsor Park, Belfast | |
| 12 October 2012 | 2014 FIFA World Cup qualifying | Wales | 2–1 | Scotland | (Wales) Cardiff City Stadium, Cardiff | |
| 22 March 2013 | 2014 FIFA World Cup qualifying | Scotland | 1–2 | Wales | (Scotland) Hampden Park, Glasgow | |
| 11 November 2016 | 2018 FIFA World Cup qualifying | England | 3–0 | Scotland | (England) Wembley Stadium, London | |
| 10 June 2017 | 2018 FIFA World Cup qualifying | Scotland | 2–2 | England | (Scotland) Hampden Park, Glasgow | |
| 29 November 2022 | 2022 FIFA World Cup – group stage | Wales | 0–3 | England | (Qatar) Ahmad bin Ali Stadium, Al Rayyan | (Note: First World Cup finals match between British countries.) |

== UEFA European Championship ==
| Date | Competition | | Score | | Venue | Notes |
|---|---|---|---|---|---|---|
| 7 February 1979 | UEFA Euro 1980 qualifying | England | 4–0 | Northern Ireland | (England) Wembley Stadium (I), London | |
| 17 October 1979 | UEFA Euro 1980 qualifying | Northern Ireland | 1–5 | England | (Northern Ireland) Windsor Park, Belfast | |
| 15 October 1986 | UEFA Euro 1988 qualifying | England | 3–0 | Northern Ireland | (England) Wembley Stadium (I), London | |
| 1 April 1987 | UEFA Euro 1988 qualifying | Northern Ireland | 0–2 | England | (Northern Ireland) Windsor Park, Belfast | |
| 15 June 1996 | UEFA Euro 1996 finals – group stage | Scotland | 0–2 | England | (England) Wembley Stadium (I), London | (Note: First match between British countries at a major championship) |
| 13 November 1999 | UEFA Euro 2000 qualifying play-offs | Scotland | 0–2 | England | (Scotland) Hampden Park, Glasgow | |
| 17 November 1999 | UEFA Euro 2000 qualifying play-offs | England | 0–1 | Scotland | (England) Wembley Stadium (I), London | |
| 26 March 2011 | UEFA Euro 2012 qualifying | Wales | 0–2 | England | (Wales) Millennium Stadium, Cardiff | |
| 6 September 2011 | UEFA Euro 2012 qualifying | England | 1–0 | Wales | (England) Wembley Stadium, London | |
| 16 June 2016 | UEFA Euro 2016 finals – group stage | England | 2–1 | Wales | (France) Stade Bollaert-Delelis, Lens | (Note: First match between British countries played outside the UK and Ireland.) |
| 25 June 2016 | UEFA Euro 2016 finals – round of 16 | Wales | 1–0 | Northern Ireland | (France) Parc des Princes, Paris | (Note: First match involving Northern Ireland and another British team played outside the UK and Ireland; first knockout match between any two British countries in a major tournament.) |
| 18 June 2021 | UEFA Euro 2020 finals – group stage | England | 0–0 | Scotland | (England) Wembley Stadium, London | |

== British Home Championship ==
The British Home Championship (also known as the Home International Championship, the Home Internationals and the British Championship) was an annual football competition contested between the United Kingdom's four national teams: England, Scotland, Wales and Northern Ireland (the last of whom competed as Ireland for most of the competition's history). Starting during the 1883–84 season, it was the oldest international football tournament and it was contested until the 1983–84 season, when it was abolished after 100 years.

The 1949–50 and 1953–54 championships doubled up as qualifying stages for the 1950 FIFA World Cup and 1954 FIFA World Cup respectively.

== Friendlies ==
| Date | | Score | | Venue | Notes |
Pre-British Home Championship
| 30 November 1872 | Scotland | 0–0 | England | (Scotland) Hamilton Crescent, Glasgow | |
| 8 March 1873 | England | 4–2 | Scotland | (England) Kennington Oval, London | |
| 7 March 1874 | Scotland | 2–1 | England | (Scotland) Hamilton Crescent, Glasgow | |
| 6 March 1875 | England | 2–2 | Scotland | (England) Kennington Oval, London | |
| 4 March 1876 | Scotland | 3–0 | England | (Scotland) Hamilton Crescent, Glasgow | |
| 25 March 1876 | Scotland | 4–0 | Wales | (Scotland) Hamilton Crescent, Glasgow | |
| 3 March 1877 | England | 1–3 | Scotland | (England) Kennington Oval, London | |
| 5 March 1877 | Wales | 0–2 | Scotland | (Wales) Acton Park, Wrexham | |
| 2 March 1878 | Scotland | 7–2 | England | (Scotland) Hampden Park (I), Glasgow | |
| 23 March 1878 | Scotland | 9–0 | Wales | (Scotland) Hampden Park (I), Glasgow | |
| 18 January 1879 | England | 2–1 | Wales | (England) Kennington Oval, London | |
| 5 April 1879 | England | 5–4 | Scotland | (England) Kennington Oval, London | |
| 7 April 1879 | Wales | 0–3 | Scotland | (Wales) Acton Park, Wrexham | |
| 13 March 1880 | Scotland | 5–4 | England | (Scotland) Hampden Park (I), Glasgow | |
| 15 March 1880 | Wales | 2–3 | England | (Wales) Racecourse Ground, Wrexham | |
| 27 March 1880 | Scotland | 5–1 | Wales | (Scotland) Hampden Park (I), Glasgow | |
| 18 January 1881 | England | 0–1 | Wales | (England) Alexandra Meadows, Blackburn | |
| 12 March 1881 | England | 1–6 | Scotland | (England) Kennington Oval, London | |
| 14 March 1881 | Wales | 1–5 | Scotland | (Wales) Acton Park, Wrexham | |
| 18 February 1882 | Ireland | 0–13 | England | (Northern Ireland) Knock Ground, Belfast | |
| 25 February 1882 | Wales | 7–1 | Ireland | (Wales) Racecourse Ground, Wrexham | |
| 11 March 1882 | Scotland | 5–1 | England | (Scotland) Hampden Park (I), Glasgow | |
| 13 March 1882 | Wales | 5–3 | England | (Wales) Racecourse Ground, Wrexham | |
| 25 March 1882 | Scotland | 5–0 | Wales | (Scotland) Hampden Park (I), Glasgow | |
| 3 February 1883 | England | 5–0 | Scotland | (England) Kennington Oval, London | |
| 24 February 1883 | England | 7–0 | Ireland | (England) Aigburth Cricket Ground, Liverpool | |
| 10 March 1883 | England | 2–3 | Scotland | (England) Bramall Lane, Sheffield | |
| 12 March 1883 | Wales | 0–3 | Scotland | (Wales) Acton Park, Wrexham | |
| 17 March 1883 | Ireland | 1–1 | Wales | (Northern Ireland) Ulster Cricket Ground, Belfast | |
During the British Home Championship
| 14 February 1973 | Scotland | 0–5 | England | (Scotland) Hampden Park, Glasgow | (Note: Match celebrating centenary of the SFA) |
| 24 March 1976 | Wales | 1–2 | England | (Wales) Racecourse Ground, Wrexham | (Note: Match celebrating the centenary of the FAW) |
Post-British Home Championship
| 18 February 1992 | Scotland | 1–0 | Northern Ireland | (Scotland) Hampden Park, Glasgow | |
| 27 May 1997 | Scotland | 0–1 | Wales | (Scotland) Rugby Park, Kilmarnock | |
| 18 February 2004 | Wales | 4–0 | Scotland | (Wales) Millennium Stadium, Cardiff | |
| 6 February 2007 | Northern Ireland | 0–0 | Wales | (Northern Ireland) Windsor Park, Belfast | |
| 20 August 2008 | Scotland | 0–0 | Northern Ireland | (Scotland) Hampden Park, Glasgow | |
| 14 November 2009 | Wales | 3–0 | Scotland | (Wales) Cardiff City Stadium, Cardiff | |
| 14 August 2013 | England | 3–2 | Scotland | (England) Wembley Stadium, London | |
| 18 November 2014 | Scotland | 1–3 | England | (Scotland) Celtic Park, Glasgow | |
| 25 March 2015 | Scotland | 1–0 | Northern Ireland | (Scotland) Hampden Park, Glasgow | |
| 24 March 2016 | Wales | 1–1 | Northern Ireland | (Wales) Cardiff City Stadium, Cardiff | |
| 8 October 2020 | England | 3–0 | Wales | (England) Wembley Stadium, London | |
| 12 September 2023 | Scotland | 1–3 | England | (Scotland) Hampden Park, Glasgow | |
| 26 March 2024 | Scotland | 0–1 | Northern Ireland | (Scotland) Hampden Park, Glasgow | |
| 9 October 2025 | England | 3–0 | Wales | (England) Wembley Stadium, London | |
| 31 March 2026 | Wales | 1–1 | Northern Ireland | (Wales) Cardiff City Stadium, Cardiff | |

== Rous Cup and Nations Cup ==
| Date | Competition | | Score | | Venue | Notes |
|---|---|---|---|---|---|---|
| 25 May 1985 | 1985 Rous Cup | Scotland | 1–0 | England | (Scotland) Hampden Park, Glasgow | |
| 23 April 1986 | 1986 Rous Cup | England | 2–1 | Scotland | (England) Wembley Stadium (I), London | |
| 23 May 1987 | 1987 Rous Cup | Scotland | 0–0 | England | (Scotland) Hampden Park, Glasgow | |
| 21 May 1988 | 1988 Rous Cup | England | 1–0 | Scotland | (England) Wembley Stadium (I), London | |
| 27 May 1989 | 1989 Rous Cup | Scotland | 0–2 | England | (Scotland) Hampden Park, Glasgow | |
| 9 February 2011 | 2011 Nations Cup | Northern Ireland | 0–3 | Scotland | (Republic of Ireland) Aviva Stadium, Dublin | |
| 25 May 2011 | 2011 Nations Cup | Wales | 1–3 | Scotland | (Republic of Ireland) Aviva Stadium, Dublin | |
| 27 May 2011 | 2011 Nations Cup | Wales | 2–0 | Northern Ireland | (Republic of Ireland) Aviva Stadium, Dublin | |

== Head to head (Home Nations) ==
=== England ===
| Opponent | Played | Won | Drawn | Lost | W% |
|---|---|---|---|---|---|
| Northern Ireland | 98 | 75 | 16 | 7 | 76.53 |
| Scotland | 112 | 47 | 24 | 41 | 41.96 |
| Wales | 102 | 67 | 21 | 14 | 65.69 |
| Total | 312 | 189 | 61 | 62 | 60.58 |

=== Northern Ireland ===
| Opponent | Played | Won | Drawn | Lost | W% |
|---|---|---|---|---|---|
| England | 98 | 7 | 16 | 75 | 7.14 |
| Scotland | 95 | 15 | 17 | 63 | 15.79 |
| Wales | 96 | 28 | 24 | 44 | 29.17 |
| Total | 289 | 50 | 57 | 182 | 17.3 |

=== Scotland ===
| Opponent | Played | Won | Drawn | Lost | W% |
|---|---|---|---|---|---|
| England | 112 | 41 | 24 | 47 | 36.61 |
| Northern Ireland | 95 | 63 | 17 | 15 | 66.32 |
| Wales | 107 | 61 | 23 | 23 | 57.01 |
| Total | 314 | 165 | 64 | 85 | 52.55 |

=== Wales ===
| Opponent | Played | Won | Drawn | Lost | W% |
|---|---|---|---|---|---|
| England | 102 | 14 | 21 | 67 | 13.73 |
| Northern Ireland | 96 | 44 | 24 | 28 | 45.83 |
| Scotland | 107 | 23 | 23 | 61 | 21.5 |
| Total | 305 | 81 | 68 | 156 | 26.56 |

== British Overseas Territories ==
Seven British Overseas Territories have a national football team affiliated to FIFA – Anguilla, Bermuda, British Virgin Islands, Cayman Islands, Gibraltar, Montserrat and Turks and Caicos Islands. All play within the CONCACAF (North American) area, with the exception of Gibraltar. This makes fixtures between the Home Nations and the overseas territories rare, although the North American overseas territories play between each other often.

=== Gibraltar ===
==== Gibraltar v UK Home Nations ====
In 2013, the Gibraltar Football Association became a member of UEFA enabling their national team to play international fixtures. This opened the possibility of Gibraltar playing against a Home Nation during the qualification phase of major international competitions. Gibraltar's first such match was against Scotland at Hampden Park during the qualifying competition for Euro 2016.

| Date | Competition | | Score | | Venue | Notes |
|---|---|---|---|---|---|---|
| 29 March 2015 | UEFA Euro 2016 qualifying | Scotland | 6–1 | Gibraltar | (Scotland) Hampden Park, Glasgow | |
| 11 October 2015 | UEFA Euro 2016 qualifying | Gibraltar | 0–6 | Scotland | (Portugal) Estádio Algarve, Faro | |
| 11 October 2023 | Friendly | Wales | 4–0 | Gibraltar | (Wales) Racecourse Ground, Wrexham | |
| 3 June 2024 | Friendly | Gibraltar | 0–2 | Scotland | (Portugal) Estádio Algarve, Faro | |
| 6 June 2024 | Friendly | Gibraltar | 0–0 | Wales | (Portugal) Estádio Algarve, Faro | |

==== Gibraltar vs other overseas territories ====
In June 2026, Gibraltar faced other British Overseas Territories for the first time, when they played host to the British Virgin Islands and the Cayman Islands in a pair of friendlies.

| Date | Competition | | Score | | Venue | Notes |
|---|---|---|---|---|---|---|
| 3 June 2026 | Friendly | Gibraltar | 4–0 | British Virgin Islands | Europa Sports Park, Gibraltar | |
| 6 June 2026 | Friendly | Gibraltar | 4–1 | Cayman Islands | Europa Sports Park, Gibraltar | |

=== CONCACAF overseas territories ===
==== FIFA World Cup ====
| Date | Competition | | Score | | Venue | Notes |
|---|---|---|---|---|---|---|
| 5 March 2000 | 2002 FIFA World Cup qualification | British Virgin Islands | 1–5 | Bermuda | (British Virgin Islands) Shirley Ground, Road Town | |
| 19 March 2000 | 2002 FIFA World Cup qualification | Bermuda | 9–0 | British Virgin Islands | Bermuda National Stadium, Hamilton | |
| 29 February 2004 | 2006 FIFA World Cup qualification | Bermuda | 13–0 | Montserrat | Bermuda National Stadium, Hamilton | |
| 21 March 2004 | 2006 FIFA World Cup qualification | Montserrat | 0–7 | Bermuda | (Montserrat) Blakes Estate Stadium, Look Out | |
| 3 February 2008 | 2010 FIFA World Cup qualification | Bermuda | 1–1 | Cayman Islands | Bermuda National Stadium, Hamilton | |
| 30 March 2008 | 2010 FIFA World Cup qualification | Cayman Islands | 1–3 | Bermuda | (Cayman Islands) Truman Bodden Stadium, George Town | |
| 8 June 2021 | 2022 FIFA World Cup qualification | Bermuda | 1–1 | Cayman Islands | (United States) IMG Academy, Bradenton | |
| 22 March 2024 | 2026 FIFA World Cup qualification | Anguilla | 0–0 | Turks and Caicos Islands | (Anguilla) Raymond E. Guishard Technical Centre, The Valley | |
| 26 March 2024 | 2026 FIFA World Cup qualification | Turks and Caicos Islands | 1–1 | Anguilla | (Turks and Caicos Islands) TCIFA National Academy, Providenciales | |
| 4 June 2025 | 2026 FIFA World Cup qualification | Bermuda | 5–0 | Cayman Islands | (Bermuda) Dame Flora Duffy National Sports Centre, Hamilton | |

==== CFU Caribbean Cup ====
| Date | Competition | | Score | | Venue | Notes |
|---|---|---|---|---|---|---|
| 28 March 1990 | 1990 Caribbean Cup qualification | Anguilla | 0–6 | British Virgin Islands | (Collectivity of Saint Martin) Stade Alberic Richards, Marigot | |
| 10 May 1991 | 1991 Caribbean Cup qualification | British Virgin Islands | 1–2 | Cayman Islands | (Saint Kitts and Nevis) Warner Park, Basseterre | |
| 14 May 1991 | 1991 Caribbean Cup qualification | Montserrat | 1–1 | Anguilla | (Saint Lucia) Vieux Fort National Stadium, Vieux Fort | |
| 2 March 1994 | 1994 Caribbean Cup qualification | British Virgin Islands | 0–5 | Cayman Islands | (Cayman Islands) Truman Bodden Stadium, George Town | |
| 26 March 1995 | 1995 Caribbean Cup qualification | Montserrat | 5–2 | Anguilla | (Montserrat) Sturge Park, Plymouth | |
| 2 April 1995 | 1995 Caribbean Cup qualification | Anguilla | 0–1 | Montserrat | (Anguilla) Webster Park, The Valley | |
| 3 April 1997 | 1997 Caribbean Cup qualification | British Virgin Islands | 4–1 | Anguilla | (Dominica) Windsor Park, Roseau | |
| 10 May 1998 | 1998 Caribbean Cup qualification | Cayman Islands | 2–0 | Bermuda | (Cayman Islands) Truman Bodden Stadium, George Town | |
| 5 February 1999 | 1999 Caribbean Cup qualification | British Virgin Islands | 3–1 | Montserrat | (British Virgin Islands) Shirley Ground, Road Town | |
| 7 February 1999 | 1999 Caribbean Cup qualification | British Virgin Islands | 3–0 | Montserrat | (British Virgin Islands) Shirley Ground, Road Town | |
| 7 May 1999 | 1999 Caribbean Cup qualification | Bermuda | 4–1 | Cayman Islands | Bermuda National Stadium, Hamilton | |
| 8 February 2001 | 2001 Caribbean Cup qualification | Montserrat | 1–4 | Anguilla | (Collectivity of Saint Martin) Stade Alberic Richards, Marigot | |
| 4 April 2001 | 2001 Caribbean Cup qualification | British Virgin Islands | 2–2 | Cayman Islands | (Martinique) Stade Dillon, Fort-de-France | |
| 24 November 2004 | 2005 Caribbean Cup qualification | Bermuda | 2–1 | Cayman Islands | (Saint Vincent and the Grenadines) Arnos Vale Stadium, Kingstown | |
| 26 November 2004 | 2005 Caribbean Cup qualification | British Virgin Islands | 0–1 | Cayman Islands | (Saint Vincent and the Grenadines) Arnos Vale Stadium, Kingstown | |
| 28 November 2004 | 2005 Caribbean Cup qualification | British Virgin Islands | 2–0 | Bermuda | (Saint Vincent and the Grenadines) Arnos Vale Stadium, Kingstown | |
| 4 September 2006 | 2007 Caribbean Cup qualification | Cayman Islands | 0–2 | Turks and Caicos Islands | (Cuba) Estadio Pedro Marrero, Havana | |
| 31 August 2008 | 2008 Caribbean Cup qualification | Cayman Islands | 0–0 | Bermuda | (Cayman Islands) Truman Bodden Stadium, George Town | |
| 4 October 2010 | 2010 Caribbean Cup qualification | Cayman Islands | 4–1 | Anguilla | (Puerto Rico) Estadio Juan Ramón Loubriel, Bayamón | |
| 9 September 2012 | 2012 Caribbean Cup qualification | British Virgin Islands | 7–0 | Montserrat | (Martinique) Stade Pierre-Aliker, Fort-de-France | |
| 3 June 2014 | 2014 Caribbean Cup qualification | British Virgin Islands | 0–2 | Turks and Caicos Islands | (Aruba) Trinidad Stadium, Oranjestad | |

==== CONCACAF Nations League ====
| Date | Competition | | Score | | Venue | Notes |
|---|---|---|---|---|---|---|
| 21 March 2019 | 2019–20 CONCACAF Nations League qualifying | British Virgin Islands | 2–2 | Turks and Caicos Islands | (Anguilla) Raymond E. Guishard Technical Centre, The Valley | |
| 22 March 2019 | 2019–20 CONCACAF Nations League qualifying | Cayman Islands | 2–0 | Montserrat | (Cayman Islands) Ed Bush Stadium, West Bay | |
| 3 June 2022 | 2022–23 CONCACAF Nations League | British Virgin Islands | 1–1 | Cayman Islands | (British Virgin Islands) A. O. Shirley Recreation Ground, Road Town | |
| 6 June 2022 | 2022–23 CONCACAF Nations League | Cayman Islands | 1–1 | British Virgin Islands | (Cayman Islands) Truman Bodden Sports Complex, George Town | |
| 11 June 2022 | 2022–23 CONCACAF Nations League | Montserrat | 3–2 | Bermuda | (Dominican Republic) Estadio Olímpico Félix Sánchez, Santo Domingo | |
| 14 June 2022 | 2022–23 CONCACAF Nations League | Bermuda | 3–0^{A} | Montserrat | (Bermuda) Dame Flora Duffy National Sports Centre, Hamilton | (Note: The Bermuda v Montserrat match, scheduled for 14 June 2022, was cancelled due to Montserrat deciding to withdraw from the match. The match was later awarded to Bermuda as a 3–0 win.) |
| 9 September 2023 | 2023–24 CONCACAF Nations League | British Virgin Islands | 3–1 | Turks and Caicos Islands | (British Virgin Islands) A. O. Shirley Recreation Ground, Road Town | |
| 16 October 2023 | 2023–24 CONCACAF Nations League | Turks and Caicos Islands | 2–2 | British Virgin Islands | (Turks and Caicos Islands) TCIFA National Academy, Providenciales | |
| 4 September 2024 | 2024–25 CONCACAF Nations League | Anguilla | 2–0 | Turks and Caicos Islands | (Turks and Caicos Islands) TCIFA National Academy, Providenciales | |
| 4 September 2024 | 2024–25 CONCACAF Nations League | British Virgin Islands | 0–1 | Cayman Islands | (Cayman Islands) Truman Bodden Sports Complex, George Town | |
| 12 October 2024 | 2024–25 CONCACAF Nations League | Turks and Caicos Islands | 2–1 | Anguilla | (Belize) FFB Stadium, Belmopan | |
| 9 October 2024 | 2024–25 CONCACAF Nations League | Cayman Islands | 1–0 | British Virgin Islands | (Saint Kitts and Nevis) Warner Park, Basseterre | |
| 23 September 2026 | 2026–27 CONCACAF Nations League | Turks and Caicos Islands | 0–2 | Montserrat | (Turks and Caicos Islands) TCIFA National Academy, Providenciales | |
| 26 September 2026 | 2026–27 CONCACAF Nations League | Montserrat | 3–0 | British Virgin Islands | (Turks and Caicos Islands) TCIFA National Academy, Providenciales | |
| 29 September 2026 | 2026–27 CONCACAF Nations League | British Virgin Islands | 0–3 | Turks and Caicos Islands | (Turks and Caicos Islands) TCIFA National Academy, Providenciales | |
| 1 October 2026 | 2026–27 CONCACAF Nations League | British Virgin Islands | 0–2 | Montserrat | (Turks and Caicos Islands) TCIFA National Academy, Providenciales | |
| 4 October 2026 | 2026–27 CONCACAF Nations League | Turks and Caicos Islands | 3–0 | British Virgin Islands | (Turks and Caicos Islands) TCIFA National Academy, Providenciales | |
| 6 October 2026 | 2026–27 CONCACAF Nations League | Montserrat | 4–1 | Turks and Caicos Islands | (Turks and Caicos Islands) TCIFA National Academy, Providenciales | |

==== Friendlies ====
| Date | Competition | | Score | | Venue | Notes |
|---|---|---|---|---|---|---|
| 1 October 1985 | 1985 Leeward Islands Tournament | Anguilla | 0–1 | British Virgin Islands | (Anguilla) Ronald Webster Park, The Valley | |
| 9 September 1999 | Friendly | Bermuda | 3–1 | Cayman Islands | Bermuda National Stadium, Hamilton | |
| 11 September 1999 | Friendly | Bermuda | 1–0 | Cayman Islands | Bermuda National Stadium, Hamilton | |
| 25 February 2000 | Friendly | British Virgin Islands | 3–4 | Anguilla | (British Virgin Islands) A. O. Shirley Recreation Ground, Road Town | |
| 27 February 2000 | Friendly | British Virgin Islands | 4–0 | Anguilla | (British Virgin Islands) A. O. Shirley Recreation Ground, Road Town | |
| 27 September 2000 | Friendly | Cayman Islands | 3–0 | Turks and Caicos Islands | (Cayman Islands) Truman Bodden Sports Complex, George Town | |
| 6 July 2002 | Friendly | British Virgin Islands | 2–1 | Anguilla | (British Virgin Islands) A. O. Shirley Recreation Ground, Road Town | |
| 18 September 2010 | Friendly | British Virgin Islands | 2–1 | Anguilla | (France) Stade Thelbert Carti, Quartier-d'Orleans, Saint Martin | |
| 7 July 2012 | Friendly | British Virgin Islands | 1–0 | Anguilla | (British Virgin Islands) A. O. Shirley Recreation Ground, Road Town | |
| 28 February 2012 | Friendly | Anguilla | 1–0 | British Virgin Islands | (Anguilla) Ronald Webster Park, The Valley | |
| 1 March 2015 | Friendly | Anguilla | 3–1 | British Virgin Islands | (Anguilla) Ronald Webster Park, The Valley | |
| 27 January 2022 | Friendly | British Virgin Islands | 1–2 | Anguilla | (England) Bisham Abbey National Sports Centre, Bisham | |
| 17 April 2025 | Friendly | Anguilla | 0–0 | British Virgin Islands | (Anguilla) Raymond E. Guishard Technical Centre, The Valley | |
| 20 April 2025 | Friendly | Anguilla | 1–0 | British Virgin Islands | (Anguilla) Raymond E. Guishard Technical Centre, The Valley | |
| 12 November 2025 | 2025–26 CONCACAF Series | Cayman Islands | 1–2 | British Virgin Islands | (Cayman Islands) Truman Bodden Sports Complex, George Town | |
| 15 November 2025 | 2025–26 CONCACAF Series | Cayman Islands | 4–0 | Anguilla | (Cayman Islands) Truman Bodden Sports Complex, George Town | |
| 26 March 2026 | 2025–26 CONCACAF Series | Cayman Islands | 1–1 | British Virgin Islands | (Cayman Islands) Truman Bodden Sports Complex, George Town | |
| 29 March 2026 | 2025–26 CONCACAF Series | British Virgin Islands | 4–0 | Anguilla | (Cayman Islands) Truman Bodden Sports Complex, George Town | |

=== Non-FIFA matches ===
In addition to games in competitions sanctioned by FIFA, friendlies and competitions have taken place that are unsanctioned, and therefore not counted as official internationals. One of the most notable competitions is the Island Games, an Olympics-style multi-sport event taking place every two years between various islands. The following list includes games played by teams of British territories that are members of either FIFA or one of FIFA's affiliated continental confederations.

| Date | Competition | | Score | | Venue | Notes |
|---|---|---|---|---|---|---|
| 25 May 1967 | Friendly | Hong Kong | 1–4 | Scotland XI | Hong Kong Stadium, Hong Kong | |
| 4 July 1993 | 1993 Island Games – Group Stage | Gibraltar | 1–2 | Jersey | (England) Green Lane, Shanklin | |
| 17 July 1995 | 1995 Island Games – Group Stage | Gibraltar | 2–1 | Isle of Man | Victoria Stadium, Gibraltar | |
| 20 July 1995 | 1995 Island Games – Semi-Final | Gibraltar | 1–0 | Jersey | Victoria Stadium, Gibraltar | |
| 29 June 1997 | 1997 Island Games – Group Stage | Gibraltar | 1–2 | Guernsey | (Jersey) Le Boulivot, Grouville | |
| 3 July 1997 | 1997 Island Games – Group Stage | Jersey | 3–2 | Gibraltar | (Jersey) Springfield Stadium, St. Helier | |
| 29 June 1999 | 1999 Island Games – Group Stage | Gibraltar | 1–5 | Jersey | (Sweden) Fardhem Football Ground, Fardhem | |
| 10 July 2001 | 2001 Island Games – Group Stage | Jersey | 2–1 | Gibraltar | (Isle of Man) The Bowl, Douglas | |
| 23 May 2004 | GFA Tournament | Gibraltar | 1–0 | Isle of Man | Victoria Stadium, Gibraltar | |
| 1 July 2007 | 2007 Island Games – Group Stage | Gibraltar | 1–1 | Jersey | (Greece) Municipal Stadium Ekonomideio, Ialysos | |
| 4 July 2007 | 2007 Island Games – Semi-Final | Gibraltar | 2–0 | Bermuda | (Greece) Diagoras Stadium, Rhodes | |
| 20 May 2008 | 2008 Four Nations | England C | 1–0 | Gibraltar | (Wales) Llanelian Road, Old Colwyn | |
| 22 May 2008 | 2008 Four Nations | Wales C | 6–2 | Gibraltar | (Wales) Belle Vue, Rhyl | |
| 24 May 2008 | 2008 Four Nations | Scotland Semi-Pro | 4–2 | Gibraltar | (England) Park Hall, Oswestry | |
| 28 June 2009 | 2009 Island Games – Group Stage | Gibraltar | 0–0 | Guernsey | (Finland) Solvallen, Eckerö | |
| 15 November 2011 | Friendly | Gibraltar | 3–1 | England C | Victoria Stadium, Gibraltar | |
| 28 June 2012 | International Challenge Shield | Gibraltar | 2–0 | Isle of Man | Victoria Stadium, Gibraltar | |
| 30 June 2012 | International Challenge Shield | Gibraltar | 2–1 | Jersey | Victoria Stadium, Gibraltar | |
| 5 June 2013 | Friendly | Bermuda | 1–6 | England C | Bermuda National Stadium, Hamilton | |
| 15 July 2013 | 2013 Island Games – Group Stage | Bermuda | 8–0 | Falkland Islands | Bermuda National Stadium, Hamilton | |
| 30 June 2015 | 2015 Island Games – Group Stage | Gibraltar | 0–4 | Guernsey | (Jersey) Springfield Stadium, St. Helier | |
| 17 July 2025 | 2025 Island Games – Semi-Final | Jersey | 2–3 | Bermuda | (Scotland) Kirkwall Grammar School, Kirkwall | |

==== Muratti Vase ====
The Muratti Vase is an annual tournament between the three major island sides of the Channel Islands - Jersey, Guernsey and Alderney. Originally established in 1905, the competition takes the form of two matches; a semi-final between Alderney and one of the other two sides, with the winner playing the third side in the final. Prior to the Second World War, a draw would take place to determine the two semi-finalists, but since 1948 Jersey and Guernsey have played the semi-final in alternate years.

=== Head to head (British Overseas Territories) ===
==== Gibraltar ====
| Opponent | Played | Won | Drawn | Lost | W% |
Official internationals
| England | 0 | 0 | 0 | 0 | 0 |
| Northern Ireland | 0 | 0 | 0 | 0 | 0 |
| Scotland | 3 | 0 | 0 | 3 | 0 |
| Wales | 2 | 0 | 1 | 1 | 0 |
| British Virgin Islands | 1 | 1 | 0 | 0 | 100 |
| Cayman Islands | 1 | 1 | 0 | 0 | 100 |
| Total | 7 | 2 | 1 | 4 | 28.57 |
Unofficial internationals
| Bermuda | 1 | 1 | 0 | 0 | 100 |
| England C | 2 | 1 | 0 | 1 | 50 |
| Guernsey | 3 | 0 | 1 | 2 | 0 |
| Isle of Man | 3 | 3 | 0 | 0 | 100 |
| Jersey | 7 | 2 | 1 | 4 | 28.57 |
| Scotland Semi-Pro | 1 | 0 | 0 | 1 | 0 |
| Wales C | 1 | 0 | 0 | 1 | 0 |
| Total | 18 | 7 | 2 | 9 | 38.89 |

==== Anguilla ====
| Opponent | Played | Won | Drawn | Lost | W% |
|---|---|---|---|---|---|
| British Virgin Islands | 14 | 5 | 1 | 8 | 35.71 |
| Cayman Islands | 2 | 0 | 0 | 2 | 0 |
| Montserrat | 4 | 1 | 1 | 2 | 25 |
| Turks and Caicos Islands | 3 | 1 | 2 | 0 | 33.33 |
| Total | 23 | 7 | 4 | 12 | 30.43 |

==== Bermuda ====
| Opponent | Played | Won | Drawn | Lost | W% |
Official internationals
| British Virgin Islands | 3 | 2 | 0 | 1 | 66.67 |
| Cayman Islands | 10 | 6 | 3 | 1 | 60 |
| Montserrat | 4 | 3 | 0 | 1 | 75 |
| Total | 17 | 11 | 3 | 3 | 64.71 |
Unofficial internationals
| England C | 1 | 0 | 0 | 1 | 0 |
| Falkland Islands | 1 | 1 | 0 | 0 | 100 |
| Gibraltar | 1 | 0 | 0 | 1 | 0 |
| Jersey | 1 | 1 | 0 | 0 | 100 |
| Total | 4 | 2 | 0 | 2 | 50 |

==== British Virgin islands ====
| Opponent | Played | Won | Drawn | Lost | W% |
|---|---|---|---|---|---|
| Anguilla | 14 | 8 | 1 | 5 | 57.14 |
| Bermuda | 3 | 1 | 0 | 2 | 33.33 |
| Cayman Islands | 9 | 1 | 4 | 4 | 11.11 |
| Gibraltar | 1 | 0 | 0 | 1 | 0 |
| Montserrat | 5 | 3 | 0 | 2 | 60 |
| Turks and Caicos Islands | 6 | 1 | 2 | 3 | 16.67 |
| Total | 38 | 14 | 7 | 17 | 36.84 |

==== Cayman Islands ====
| Opponent | Played | Won | Drawn | Lost | W% |
|---|---|---|---|---|---|
| Anguilla | 1 | 1 | 0 | 0 | 100 |
| Bermuda | 10 | 1 | 3 | 6 | 10 |
| British Virgin Islands | 9 | 4 | 4 | 1 | 44.44 |
| Gibraltar | 1 | 0 | 0 | 1 | 0 |
| Montserrat | 1 | 1 | 0 | 0 | 100 |
| Turks and Caicos Islands | 2 | 1 | 0 | 1 | 50 |
| Total | 24 | 8 | 7 | 9 | 33.33 |

==== Montserrat ====
| Opponent | Played | Won | Drawn | Lost | W% |
|---|---|---|---|---|---|
| Anguilla | 4 | 2 | 1 | 1 | 50 |
| Bermuda | 4 | 1 | 0 | 3 | 25 |
| British Virgin Islands | 5 | 2 | 0 | 3 | 40 |
| Cayman Islands | 1 | 0 | 0 | 1 | 0 |
| Turks and Caicos Islands | 2 | 2 | 0 | 0 | 100 |
| Total | 16 | 7 | 1 | 8 | 43.75 |

==== Turks and Caicos Islands ====
| Opponent | Played | Won | Drawn | Lost | W% |
|---|---|---|---|---|---|
| Anguilla | 3 | 0 | 2 | 1 | 0 |
| British Virgin Islands | 6 | 3 | 2 | 1 | 50 |
| Cayman Islands | 2 | 1 | 0 | 1 | 50 |
| Montserrat | 2 | 0 | 0 | 2 | 0 |
| Total | 13 | 4 | 4 | 5 | 38.46 |

== Great Britain Olympic football team ==
Because membership of the International Olympic Committee is taken by Great Britain and Northern Ireland as a single nation, a single British football team is required to participate in the Olympic football tournament. Up to the 1972 Olympics, a team was organised by The Football Association based around the England amateur team. This team participated in both the qualifying and final Olympic tournaments, as well as in preparatory games leading up to the competition. Some of these games, which served as trial games for players, were played against other British national teams, while the Great Britain team also played a handful of friendlies against national teams that were, at the time, still overseas territories of the United Kingdom.

| Date | Competition | | Score | | Venue | Notes |
|---|---|---|---|---|---|---|
| 30 April 1952 | Olympic Trial | England 'B' | 3–0 | Great Britain | (England) Highbury, London | |
| 26 September 1956 | Friendly | Great Britain | 1–2 | Uganda | (England) Cricklefield Stadium, Ilford | |
| 10 December 1956 | Friendly | Singapore | 0–4 | Great Britain | Jalan Besar Stadium, Singapore | |
| 13 December 1956 | Friendly | Malaya | 2–6 | Great Britain | (Federation of Malaya) Selangor Club Padang, Kuala Lumpur | |
| 25 January 1971 | Olympic Trial | Northern Ireland | 3–3 | Great Britain | (Northern Ireland) Windsor Park, Belfast | |

== See also ==
- List of football matches between British clubs in UEFA competitions
- England–Scotland football rivalry
- Irish derby
