= List of football matches between British clubs in UEFA competitions =

Since the inception of the European Cup in 1955, there have been many meetings in UEFA club competitions between football teams from each part of the United Kingdom – England, Northern Ireland, Scotland and Wales.

== Overview ==
In addition to the rivalry between the national sides, clubs from the English and Scottish league systems have also met on numerous occasions in the various European club competitions. These matches are frequently described by the media as being a "Battle of Britain", irrespective of the clubs involved.

There has never been a European final between an English and a Scottish club, and two Scottish clubs have never faced off in European tournaments at any stage; the closest this came to occurring was in the 1965–66 Inter-Cities Fairs Cup when Heart of Midlothian lost a playoff to Zaragoza with Dunfermline already drawn to meet the winners in the next round, and in the same competition two years later when, knowing Dundee would be the next opponent, Rangers were eliminated by eventual winners Leeds United.

Clubs from England, the second most successful nation on the continent with 35 major wins in the four main competitions (behind Spain with 41) have played each other on 23 occasions (every two-legged tie or pair of home-and-away group matches counting as one) including in five finals: the 1972 UEFA Cup final, the 2008 UEFA Champions League final, the 2019 UEFA Europa League final, the 2019 UEFA Champions League final and the 2021 UEFA Champions League final; the all-English pairings in 2019 was the first time a single nation had provided all four finalists since the Cup Winners' Cup was abolished (there were four Italian finalists in 1990 from six places available).

Despite the high number of wins by English clubs in the relevant competitions, there had never been an all-English or all-British UEFA Super Cup match (by contrast there were four all-Spanish and two all-Italian meetings in the event) until 2019, when it became a certainty due to the presence of four finalists.

There were no European ties involving English clubs during the period of their ban following the Heysel Stadium disaster in 1985.

=== European Cup/Champions League ===
Celtic and Leeds United met in the semi-final of the 1970 European Cup, which was the first contest to be popularly described as a "Battle of Britain". Celtic won the first leg at Elland Road 1–0, and the second leg was played at Hampden Park to allow a bigger crowd to attend than could be held at Celtic Park, with the resultant attendance of 136,505 the largest ever crowd for a European match. Billy Bremner opened the scoring early on to level the aggregate score, but Celtic came back to win the match 2–1 and the tie 3–1.

There was only one all-English tie under the old knockout format among four British ties overall; this was in 1978 when the two-time holders Liverpool were beaten in the opening round by Nottingham Forest, who had qualified for the competition for the first time and went on to win the trophy; they retained it the following year, before Liverpool won again in 1981 (beating Scottish title holders Aberdeen en route). Aston Villa enjoyed their own winning debut season in the 1981–82 edition to complete a sequence of six consecutive wins for English clubs.

Rangers defeated Leeds United home and away to qualify for the first Champions League group stage in 1992–93. In the early 21st century, after the entry criteria of the premier competition was expanded to include several clubs from each of the leading nations, four Champions League semi-finals between English clubs took place, three pairing Liverpool against Chelsea, plus the final in 2008 between Chelsea and Manchester United.

Although clubs from the same association cannot be drawn in the same group, an exception was made for 2005–06. As title holders Liverpool did not qualify for the Champions League through their league position, a compromise was made by UEFA to allow them to take part in the competition from the first qualifying round and without "association protection", they were eventually paired with Chelsea in the group stage.

Celtic and Manchester United were drawn together twice in the Champions League group phase in quick succession, in 2006–07 and 2008–09, while Arsenal beat Celtic 5–1 on aggregate in the 2009–10 qualifiers. Manchester United and Rangers met in the 2010–11 Champions League, with the match at Old Trafford finishing goalless. Roddy Forsyth, writing in The Daily Telegraph, commented that the growing financial disparity between the two leagues was reflected in the below capacity attendance, the defensive tactics used by Rangers, and the weakened team selection by United. In total, British teams have been drawn together 25 times since the advent of the new format in 1992. The most recent competitive meeting of clubs from England and Scotland was between Celtic and Manchester City in the 2016–17 UEFA Champions League. Manchester City were defeated by an English opponent, Liverpool, in the quarter-finals of the 2017–18 competition.

2018–19 provided another all-English quarter-final (Tottenham Hotspur overcoming Manchester City in dramatic circumstances) followed by the final itself, where Liverpool defeated Tottenham 2–0 to win their sixth European Cup. Two years later in the 2020–21 season, Manchester City reached their first ever Champions League final, where they would face Chelsea to set up the third ever all-English UCL final. Chelsea won the match 1–0 to secure their second Champions League title.

=== UEFA Cup/Europa League ===
There have been numerous ties between British clubs in the secondary competitions – 23 in the UEFA Cup, sixteen in the extinct tournament considered to be its predecessor, the Inter-Cities Fairs Cup, and thirteen in the defunct UEFA Cup Winners' Cup. Leeds' route to glory in the 1967–68 Fairs Cup featured three successive wins over Scottish opponents. Celtic lost on the away goals rule to Liverpool in the 1997–98 UEFA Cup, but they beat Blackburn Rovers and Liverpool on their run to the 2003 UEFA Cup final. Heart of Midlothian suffered a record defeat against Tottenham Hotspur in the 2011–12 UEFA Europa League, but performed more creditably against Liverpool in 2012–13.

Apart from the 1972 UEFA Cup final won by Tottenham over Wolverhampton Wanderers, and the 1972–73 UEFA Cup Semi-final when Liverpool knocked out the holders, Tottenham on away goals, the only all-English tie in more than four decades of the UEFA Cup/Europa League up until 2019 took place in 2016, when arch-rivals Liverpool and Manchester United met; the Merseyside club progressed and were eventually runners-up in the competition. The first all-English final in the Europa League era, and only the third contest between two English clubs in the competition's history, took place in 2019, when Chelsea defeated London rivals Arsenal in Baku; based 6 miles (9.7 km) apart, the clubs' supporters had to travel almost 2,500 miles (4,000 km) each way to the event on the other side of the continent.

In the 2020–21 season, qualifying round matches (including all-UK ties in successive rounds featuring Motherwell against Glentoran then Coleraine) were played over one leg behind closed doors due to the COVID-19 pandemic.

=== Historic competitions ===
Matches between English and Scottish club sides in the late 19th century were big events, such as the meeting in 1895 of English league champions Sunderland and Scottish league champions Heart of Midlothian in a game grandly described as the Championship of the World.

There have also been a number of other competitions between English and Scottish clubs. Before European competition started in 1955, the Coronation Cup was staged in 1953, to mark the coronation of Queen Elizabeth II. Four prominent clubs from each country participated in a knockout tournament, with Celtic and Hibernian defeating two English clubs each to reach the final, which Celtic won 2–0 at Hampden. A similar competition called the Empire Exhibition Trophy was staged in 1938, with Celtic defeating Everton 1–0 in the final at Ibrox. Back in 1902, the four-team British League Cup was staged in Glasgow, with both Rangers and Celtic defeating their English opponents to set up a local final, won by Celtic 3–2 (this was before the Old Firm term came into use but was one of several fixtures between the sides in the early 1900s which led to its introduction due to the frequency of their meetings).

In the 1970s, American oil giant Texaco sponsored the Texaco Cup, which was a knockout competition for clubs that had failed to qualify for the main European competitions. Interest in the competition soon waned, however, and Texaco withdrew their sponsorship after the 1974–75 season. The competition continued for a few years in the form of the Anglo-Scottish Cup, but it was discontinued in 1981. Following the English ban from Europe after Heysel, the Dubai Champions Cup was played between the English and Scottish champions for three seasons (at the start of 1986–87 and 1987–88 and towards the end of 1988–89).

=== Wales ===
Welsh sides did not take part in the Champions League until the 1993–94 season, following the creation of the Welsh Premier League, and both the champions and runners-up entered the UEFA Cup for the first time in the 1994–95 season as UEFA made the champions of smaller nations — including Northern Ireland — compete in the UEFA Cup for a three-year period.

Although the Welsh teams in the English league system were entitled to enter the Cup Winners' Cup by winning the Welsh Cup until 1995 and qualified for the competition 31 times between them, they were drawn against another British club on just two occasions — Newport County v Crusaders in 1980 and Wrexham v Manchester United in 1990. Since 2008, Welsh clubs playing in the top four divisions of the English football league system have been regarded for the purposes of European qualification as representing England, and would play in European competition as an English club. This would allow the possibility for one of these clubs to be drawn against a Welsh club representing Wales in European competition. The first Welsh side to achieve European qualification under this ruling was Swansea City who, having won the 2012–13 Football League Cup, qualified for the 2013–14 UEFA Europa League.

=== Scottish Challenge Cup ===
In 2016, the Scottish Challenge Cup, normally for Scottish Professional Football League clubs outside the Premiership, invited two teams from Wales and Northern Ireland to take part, and the following year extended entry to two clubs from the Republic of Ireland. (clubs from the NIFL Premiership and the League of Ireland Premier Division had also competed against each other in the Setanta Cup, last played in 2014). Welsh club The New Saints progressed to the semi-final in the 2016–17 season. They repeated the feat in 2017–18, being joined by Northern Irish club Crusaders. The results of ties between clubs from different countries are not included here.

For the 2018–19 edition, two English National League clubs were invited to take part in the competition, and the first non-Scottish team reached the final – Connah's Quay Nomads of Wales, who beat Edinburgh City on penalties. They would face Ross County at the Caledonian Stadium in Inverness, a controversial choice of venue being only 15 miles (24 km) from Ross County's home in Dingwall but a distance of 400 miles (640 km) for Connah's Quay Nomads, losing 3–1; previous finals had typically been held further south in Scotland's Central Belt.

Ahead of the 2023–24 edition, it was announced that that years edition of the tournament would be the final to feature non-Scottish teams, with the guest clubs being reduced to two from Northern Ireland (Cliftonville and Coleraine) and two from Wales (The New Saints and Bala Town). The New Saints were the last non-Scottish finalists, losing 2–1 to Airdrieonians at the Falkirk Stadium.

Season	Round	Nat.	Team 1	Score	Team 2	Nat.	Venue	Attendance	Win for
2016–17	Fourth round	(Wales)	Bala Town	2–4	Alloa Athletic	(Scotland)	Maes Tegid, Bala	596	(Scotland) (1 v WAL)
2016–17	Fourth round	(Scotland)	Forfar Athletic	1–3	The New Saints	(Wales)	Station Park, Forfar	691	(Wales) (1 v SCO)
2016–17	Fourth round	(Scotland)	Queen of the South	2–0	Linfield	(Northern Ireland)	Palmerston Park, Dumfries	2,358	(Scotland) (1 v NIR)
2016–17	Fourth round	(Northern Ireland)	Crusaders	0–3	Livingston	(Scotland)	Seaview, Belfast		(Scotland) (2 v NIR)
2016–17	Quarter-finals	(Scotland)	Livingston	0–3	The New Saints	(Wales)	Almondvale Stadium, Livingston	733	(Wales) (2 v SCO)
2016–17	Semi-finals	(Scotland)	St Mirren	4–1	The New Saints	(Wales)	St Mirren Park, Paisley	2,044	(Scotland) (2 v WAL)
2017–18	Second round	(Scotland)	Dumbarton	2–1 (a.e.t.)	Connah's Quay Nomads	(Wales)	Dumbarton Football Stadium, Dumbarton	491	(Scotland) (3 v WAL)
2017–18	Second round	(Northern Ireland)	Crusaders	3–2	Motherwell U20s	(Scotland)	Seaview, Belfast	494	(Northern Ireland) (1 v SCO)
2017–18	Second round	(Scotland)	The Spartans	1–2	Linfield	(Northern Ireland)	Ainslie Park, Edinburgh	902	(Northern Ireland) (2 v SCO)
2017–18	Second round	(Wales)	The New Saints	1–1 (6–5p)	Livingston	(Scotland)	Park Hall, Oswestry	403	(Wales) (3 v SCO)
2017–18	Third round	(Scotland)	Cove Rangers	0–3	Crusaders	(Northern Ireland)	Station Park, Forfar	268	(Northern Ireland) (3 v SCO)
2017–18	Third round	(Wales)	The New Saints	4–0	Elgin City	(Scotland)	Park Hall, Oswestry	404	(Wales) (4 v SCO)
2017–18	Third round	(Scotland)	Dundee United	1–0	Linfield	(Northern Ireland)	Tannadice Park, Dundee	1,967	(Scotland) (4 v WAL)
2017–18	Quarter-finals	(Scotland)	Dundee United	1–2	Crusaders	(Northern Ireland)	Tannadice Park, Dundee	2,048	(Northern Ireland) (4 v SCO)
2017–18	Quarter-finals	(Wales)	The New Saints	0–0 (4–3p)	Queen of the South	(Scotland)	Park Hall, Oswestry	808	(Wales) (5 v SCO)
2017–18	Semi-finals	(Wales)	The New Saints	1–2	Dumbarton	(Scotland)	Park Hall, Oswestry	825	(Scotland) (5 v WAL)
2017–18	Semi-finals	(Scotland)	Inverness Caledonian Thistle	3–2	Crusaders	(Northern Ireland)	Caledonian Stadium, Inverness	1,044	(Scotland) (3 v NIR)
2018–19	Second round	(England)	Boreham Wood	0–0 (5–6p)	Dunfermline Athletic	(Scotland)	Meadow Park, Borehamwood	1,001	(Scotland) (1 v ENG)
2018–19	Second round	(Scotland)	Queen of the South	4–3	Crusaders	(Northern Ireland)	Palmerston Park, Dumfries	1,204	(Scotland) (4 v NIR)
2018–19	Second round	(Scotland)	Falkirk	0–1	Connah's Quay Nomads	(Wales)	Falkirk Stadium, Falkirk	1,637	(Wales) (6 v SCO)
2018–19	Second round	(Scotland)	Airdrieonians	0–1	Sutton United	(England)	Excelsior Stadium, Airdrie	831	(England) (1 v SCO)
2018–19	Second round	(Wales)	The New Saints	2–2 (2–4p)	Queen's Park	(Scotland)	Park Hall, Oswestry	278	(Scotland) (6 v WAL)
2018–19	Second round	(Northern Ireland)	Coleraine	1–1 (2–1p)	Formartine United	(Scotland)	The Showgrounds, Coleraine	973	(Northern Ireland) (5 v SCO)
2018–19	Third round	(Wales)	Connah's Quay Nomads	2–0	Coleraine	(Northern Ireland)	Deeside Stadium, Connah's Quay	624	(Wales) (1 v NIR)
2018–19	Quarter-finals	(Scotland)	Queen's Park	1–2	Connah's Quay Nomads	(Wales)	Hampden Park, Glasgow	559	(Wales) (7 v SCO)
2018–19	Semi-finals	(Wales)	Connah's Quay Nomads	1–1 (5–4p)	Edinburgh City	(Scotland)	Deeside Stadium, Connah's Quay	1,068	(Wales) (8 v SCO)
2018–19	Final	(Scotland)	Ross County	3–1	Connah's Quay Nomads	(Wales)	Caledonian Stadium, Inverness	3,057	(Scotland) (7 v WAL)
2019–20	Third round	(Scotland)	Stenhousemuir	1–1 (3–1p)	The New Saints	(Wales)	Ochilview Park, Stenhousemuir	335	(Scotland) (8 v WAL)
2019–20	Third round	(Wales)	Wrexham	1–1 (6–5p)	Ayr United	(Scotland)	Racecourse Ground, Wrexham	1,697	(Wales) (9 v SCO)
2019–20	Third round	(Scotland)	Kelty Hearts	1–1 (2–4p)	Solihull Moors	(England)	New Central Park, Kelty	1,146	(England) (2 v SCO)
2019–20	Third round	(Scotland)	Formartine United	0–3	Glenavon	(Northern Ireland)	North Lodge Park, Pitmedden	470	(Northern Ireland) (6 v SCO)
2019–20	Third round	(Wales)	Connah's Quay Nomads	1–0	Cove Rangers	(Scotland)	Deeside Stadium, Connah's Quay	327	(Wales) (10 v SCO)
2019–20	Third round	(Northern Ireland)	Ballymena United	0–1	Rangers U21s	(Scotland)	Ballymena Showgrounds, Ballymena	895	(Scotland) (5 v NIR)
2019–20	Fourth round	(Scotland)	Raith Rovers	3–1	Glenavon	(Northern Ireland)	Stark's Park, Kirkcaldy	1,301	(Scotland) (6 v NIR)
2019–20	Fourth round	(Wales)	Wrexham	4–1	St Mirren U21s	(Scotland)	Racecourse Ground, Wrexham	1,468	(Wales) (11 v SCO)
2019–20	Fourth round	(Scotland)	Partick Thistle	2–0	Connah's Quay Nomads	(Wales)	Firhill Stadium, Glasgow	1,380	(Scotland) (9 v WAL)
2019–20	Fourth round	(England)	Solihull Moors	3–3 (3–4p)	Rangers U21s	(Scotland)	Damson Park, Solihull	1,598	(Scotland) (2 v ENG)
2019–20	Quarter-finals	(Scotland)	Rangers U21s	2–0	Wrexham	(Wales)	Ibrox Stadium, Glasgow	5,426	(Scotland) (10 v WAL)
2022–23	Third round	(Wales)	The New Saints	0–3	Dundee	(Scotland)	Park Hall, Oswestry	508	(Scotland) (11 v WAL)
2022–23	Third round	(Scotland)	Buckie Thistle	1–2	Linfield	(Northern Ireland)	Victoria Park, Buckie	561	(Northern Ireland) (7 v SCO)
2022–23	Third round	(Scotland)	Clyde	1–0	Caernarfon Town	(Wales)	New Douglas Park, Hamilton	552	(Scotland) (12 v WAL)
2022–23	Third round	(Northern Ireland)	Cliftonville	2–3	Queen's Park	(Scotland)	Solitude, Belfast	1,116	(Scotland) (7 v NIR)
2022–23	Fourth round	(Scotland)	Kelty Hearts	1–1 (5–4p)	Linfield	(Northern Ireland)	New Central Park, Kelty	1,340	(Scotland) (8 v NIR)
2023–24	Third round	(Scotland)	Hibernian B	0–3	The New Saints	(Wales)	Meadowbank Stadium, Edinburgh	119	(Wales) (12 v SCO)
2023–24	Third round	(Scotland)	Raith Rovers	3–0	Cliftonville	(Northern Ireland)	Stark's Park, Kirkcaldy	1,561	(Scotland) (9 v NIR)
2023–24	Third round	(Northern Ireland)	Coleraine	1–3	Hamilton Academical	(Scotland)	The Showgrounds, Coleraine	906	(Scotland) (10 v NIR)
2023–24	Third round	(Wales)	Bala Town	0–3	Queen's Park	(Scotland)	Maes Tegid, Bala	317	(Scotland) (13 v WAL)
2023–24	Fourth round	(Wales)	The New Saints	2–2 (5–4p)	East Fife	(Scotland)	Park Hall, Oswestry	512	(Wales) (13 v SCO)
2023–24	Quarter-finals	(Wales)	The New Saints	4–1	Arbroath	(Scotland)	Park Hall, Oswestry	587	(Wales) (14 v SCO)
2023–24	Semi-finals	(Scotland)	Falkirk	1–0	The New Saints	(Wales)	Falkirk Stadium, Falkirk	3,582	(Wales) (15 v SCO)
2023–24	Final	(Wales)	The New Saints	1–2	Airdrieonians	(Scotland)	Falkirk Stadium, Falkirk	3,191	(Scotland) (14 v WAL)

== UEFA Champions League/European Champion Clubs' Cup ==
Season	Round	Nat.	Team 1	Score	Team 2	Nat.	Venue	Attendance	Win for
1969–70	Semi-finals	(England)	Leeds United	0–1	Celtic	(Scotland)	Elland Road, Leeds	46,381	(Scotland) (1 v ENG)
1969–70	Semi-finals	(Scotland)	Celtic	2–1	Leeds United	(England)	Hampden Park, Glasgow	136,505	(Scotland) (1 v ENG)
1976–77	First round	(England)	Liverpool	2–0	Crusaders	(Northern Ireland)	Anfield, Liverpool	22,442	(England) (1 v NI)
1976–77	First round	(Northern Ireland)	Crusaders	0–5	Liverpool	(England)	Seaview, Belfast	10,500	(England) (1 v NI)
1978–79	First round	(England)	Nottingham Forest	2–0	Liverpool	(England)	City Ground, Nottingham	38,316	N/A (ENG v ENG, 1)
1978–79	First round	(England)	Liverpool	0–0	Nottingham Forest	(England)	Anfield, Liverpool	51,679	N/A (ENG v ENG, 1)
1980–81	Second round	(Scotland)	Aberdeen	0–1	Liverpool	(England)	Pittodrie, Aberdeen	23,934	(England) (1 v SCO)
1980–81	Second round	(England)	Liverpool	4–0	Aberdeen	(Scotland)	Anfield, Liverpool	36,182	(England) (1 v SCO)
1992–93	Second round	(Scotland)	Rangers	2–1	Leeds United	(England)	Ibrox, Glasgow	43,251	(Scotland) (2 v ENG)
1992–93	Second round	(England)	Leeds United	1–2	Rangers	(Scotland)	Elland Road, Leeds	25,118	(Scotland) (2 v ENG)
2003–04	Group stage	(Scotland)	Rangers	0–1	Manchester United	(England)	Ibrox, Glasgow	48,725	(England) (2 v SCO)
2003–04	Group stage	(England)	Manchester United	3–0	Rangers	(Scotland)	Old Trafford, Manchester	66,500	(England) (2 v SCO)
2003–04	Quarter-finals	(England)	Chelsea	1–1	Arsenal	(England)	Stamford Bridge, London	40,778	N/A (ENG v ENG, 2)
2003–04	Quarter-finals	(England)	Arsenal	1–2	Chelsea	(England)	Highbury, London	35,468	N/A (ENG v ENG, 2)
2004–05	Semi-finals	(England)	Chelsea	0–0	Liverpool	(England)	Stamford Bridge, London	42,500	N/A (ENG v ENG, 3)
2004–05	Semi-finals	(England)	Liverpool	1–0	Chelsea	(England)	Anfield, Liverpool	41,500	N/A (ENG v ENG, 3)
2005–06	First qualifying round	(England)	Liverpool	3–0	Total Network Solutions	(Wales)	Anfield, Liverpool	44,760	(England) (1 v WAL)
2005–06	First qualifying round	(Wales)	Total Network Solutions	0–3	Liverpool	(England)	Racecourse Ground, Wrexham	8,009	(England) (1 v WAL)
2005–06	Group stage	(England)	Liverpool	0–0	Chelsea	(England)	Anfield, Liverpool	42,750	N/A (ENG v ENG, 4)
2005–06	Group stage	(England)	Chelsea	0–0	Liverpool	(England)	Stamford Bridge, London	41,600	N/A (ENG v ENG, 4)
2006–07	Group stage	(England)	Manchester United	3–2	Celtic	(Scotland)	Old Trafford, Manchester	74,031	(Scotland) (3 v ENG)
2006–07	Group stage	(Scotland)	Celtic	1–0	Manchester United	(England)	Celtic Park, Glasgow	60,632	(Scotland) (3 v ENG)
2006–07	Semi-finals	(England)	Chelsea	1–0	Liverpool	(England)	Stamford Bridge, London	39,483	N/A (ENG v ENG, 5)
2006–07	Semi-finals	(England)	Liverpool	1–0 (4–1 p)	Chelsea	(England)	Anfield, Liverpool	42,554	N/A (ENG v ENG, 5)
2007–08	Quarter-finals	(England)	Arsenal	1–1	Liverpool	(England)	Emirates Stadium, London	60,041	N/A (ENG v ENG, 6)
2007–08	Quarter-finals	(England)	Liverpool	4–2	Arsenal	(England)	Anfield, Liverpool	41,985	N/A (ENG v ENG, 6)
2007–08	Semi-finals	(England)	Liverpool	1–1	Chelsea	(England)	Anfield, Liverpool	42,180	N/A (ENG v ENG, 7)
2007–08	Semi-finals	(England)	Chelsea	3–2	Liverpool	(England)	Stamford Bridge, London	38,300	N/A (ENG v ENG, 7)
2007–08	Final	(England)	Chelsea	1–1 (5–6 p)	Manchester United	(England)	Luzhniki Stadium, Moscow	67,310	N/A (ENG v ENG, 8)
2008–09	Group stage	(England)	Manchester United	3–0	Celtic	(Scotland)	Old Trafford, Manchester	74,655	(England) (3 v SCO)
2008–09	Group stage	(Scotland)	Celtic	1–1	Manchester United	(England)	Celtic Park, Glasgow	58,593	(England) (3 v SCO)
2008–09	Quarter-finals	(England)	Liverpool	1–3	Chelsea	(England)	Anfield, Liverpool	42,543	N/A (ENG v ENG, 9)
2008–09	Quarter-finals	(England)	Chelsea	4–4	Liverpool	(England)	Stamford Bridge, London	38,286	N/A (ENG v ENG, 9)
2008–09	Semi-finals	(England)	Manchester United	1–0	Arsenal	(England)	Old Trafford, Manchester	74,733	N/A (ENG v ENG, 10)
2008–09	Semi-finals	(England)	Arsenal	1–3	Manchester United	(England)	Emirates Stadium, London	59,867	N/A (ENG v ENG, 10)
2009–10	Play-off round	(Scotland)	Celtic	0–2	Arsenal	(England)	Celtic Park, Glasgow	58,165	(England) (4 v SCO)
2009–10	Play-off round	(England)	Arsenal	3–1	Celtic	(Scotland)	Emirates Stadium, London	59,962	(England) (4 v SCO)
2010–11	Group stage	(England)	Manchester United	0–0	Rangers	(Scotland)	Old Trafford, Manchester	74,408	(England) (5 v SCO)
2010–11	Group stage	(Scotland)	Rangers	0–1	Manchester United	(England)	Ibrox, Glasgow	49,764	(England) (5 v SCO)
2010–11	Quarter-finals	(England)	Chelsea	0–1	Manchester United	(England)	Stamford Bridge, London	37,915	N/A (ENG v ENG, 11)
2010–11	Quarter-finals	(England)	Manchester United	2–1	Chelsea	(England)	Old Trafford, Manchester	74,672	N/A (ENG v ENG, 11)
2013–14	Second qualifying round	(Northern Ireland)	Cliftonville	0–3	Celtic	(Scotland)	Solitude, Belfast	5,442	(Scotland) (1 v NI)
2013–14	Second qualifying round	(Scotland)	Celtic	2–0	Cliftonville	(Northern Ireland)	Celtic Park, Glasgow	37,097	(Scotland) (1 v NI)
2016–17	Group stage	(Scotland)	Celtic	3–3	Manchester City	(England)	Celtic Park, Glasgow	57,592	(England) (6 v SCO)
2016–17	Group stage	(England)	Manchester City	1–1	Celtic	(Scotland)	Etihad Stadium, Manchester	51,297	(England) (6 v SCO)
2017–18	Second qualifying round	(Northern Ireland)	Linfield	0–2	Celtic	(Scotland)	Windsor Park, Belfast	6,359	(Scotland) (2 v NI)
2017–18	Second qualifying round	(Scotland)	Celtic	4–0	Linfield	(Northern Ireland)	Celtic Park, Glasgow	58,075	(Scotland) (2 v NI)
2017–18	Quarter-finals	(England)	Liverpool	3–0	Manchester City	(England)	Anfield, Liverpool	50,685	N/A (ENG v ENG, 12)
2017–18	Quarter-finals	(England)	Manchester City	1–2	Liverpool	(England)	Etihad Stadium, Manchester	53,461	N/A (ENG v ENG, 12)
2018–19	Quarter-finals	(England)	Tottenham Hotspur	1–0	Manchester City	(England)	Tottenham Hotspur Stadium, London	60,044	N/A (ENG v ENG, 13)
2018–19	Quarter-finals	(England)	Manchester City	4–3	Tottenham Hotspur	(England)	Etihad Stadium, Manchester	53,348	N/A (ENG v ENG, 13)
2018–19	Final	(England)	Tottenham Hotspur	0–2	Liverpool	(England)	Wanda Metropolitano, Madrid	63,272	N/A (ENG v ENG, 14)
2020–21	Final	(England)	Manchester City	0–1	Chelsea	(England)	Estádio do Dragão, Porto	14,110	N/A (ENG v ENG, 15)
2022–23	First qualifying round	(Wales)	The New Saints	1–0	Linfield	(Northern Ireland)	Park Hall, Oswestry, England	1,034	(Northern Ireland) (1 v WAL)
2022–23	First qualifying round	(Northern Ireland)	Linfield	2–0 (a.e.t.)	The New Saints	(Wales)	Windsor Park, Belfast	2,971	(Northern Ireland) (1 v WAL)
2022–23	Group stage	(England)	Liverpool	2–0	Rangers	(Scotland)	Anfield, Liverpool	49,512	(England) (7 v SCO)
2022–23	Group stage	(Scotland)	Rangers	1–7	Liverpool	(England)	Ibrox, Glasgow	48,820	(England) (7 v SCO)
2024–25	League phase	(England)	Aston Villa	4–2	Celtic	(Scotland)	Villa Park, Birmingham	42,824	(England) (8 v SCO)

== UEFA Super Cup ==
Year	Round		Team 1	Score	Team 2		Venue	Attendance	Win for
2019	Final	(England)	Liverpool	2–2 (5–4 p)	Chelsea	(England)	Vodafone Park, Istanbul	38,434	N/A (ENG v ENG, 1)

== UEFA Europa League/UEFA Cup ==
Season	Round		Team 1	Score	Team 2		Venue	Attendance	Win for
1971–72	Final	(England)	Wolverhampton Wanderers	1–2	Tottenham Hotspur	(England)	Molineux, Wolverhampton	38,362	N/A (ENG v ENG, 1)
1971–72	Final	(England)	Tottenham Hotspur	1–1	Wolverhampton Wanderers	(England)	White Hart Lane, London	54,303	N/A (ENG v ENG, 1)
1972–73	Semi-final	(England)	Liverpool	1–0	Tottenham Hotspur	(England)	Anfield, Liverpool	42,174	N/A (ENG v ENG, 2)
1972–73	Semi-final	(England)	Tottenham Hotspur	2–1(a)	Liverpool	(England)	White Hart Lane, London	46,919	N/A (ENG v ENG, 2)
1973–74	Second round	(Scotland)	Aberdeen	1–1	Tottenham Hotspur	(England)	Pittodrie, Aberdeen	30,000	(England) (1 v SCO)
1973–74	Second round	(England)	Tottenham Hotspur	4–1	Aberdeen	(Scotland)	White Hart Lane, London	21,785	(England) (1 v SCO)
1973–74	Second round	(England)	Leeds United	0–0	Hibernian	(Scotland)	Elland Road, Leeds	27,145	(England) (2 v SCO)
1973–74	Second round	(Scotland)	Hibernian	0–0 (4–5 p)	Leeds United	(England)	Easter Road, Edinburgh	40,503	(England) (2 v SCO)
1975–76	First round	(Scotland)	Hibernian	1–0	Liverpool	(England)	Easter Road, Edinburgh	19,219	(England) (3 v SCO)
1975–76	First round	(England)	Liverpool	3–1	Hibernian	(Scotland)	Anfield, Liverpool	29,963	(England) (3 v SCO)
1981–82	First round	(England)	Ipswich Town	1–1	Aberdeen	(Scotland)	Portman Road, Ipswich	18,535	(Scotland) (1 v ENG)
1981–82	First round	(Scotland)	Aberdeen	3–1	Ipswich Town	(England)	Pittodrie, Aberdeen	24,000	(Scotland) (1 v ENG)
1983–84	Third round	(England)	Nottingham Forest	0–0	Celtic	(Scotland)	City Ground, Nottingham	32,017	(England) (4 v SCO)
1983–84	Third round	(Scotland)	Celtic	1–2	Nottingham Forest	(England)	Celtic Park, Glasgow	66,938	(England) (4 v SCO)
1984–85	Third round	(England)	Manchester United	2–2	Dundee United	(Scotland)	Old Trafford, Manchester	48,278	(England) (5 v SCO)
1984–85	Third round	(Scotland)	Dundee United	2–3	Manchester United	(England)	Tannadice Park, Dundee	22,500	(England) (5 v SCO)
1987–88	First round	(Northern Ireland)	Coleraine	0–1	Dundee United	(Scotland)	The Showgrounds, Coleraine	3,800	(Scotland) (1 v NI)
1987–88	First round	(Scotland)	Dundee United	3–1	Coleraine	(Northern Ireland)	Tannadice Park, Dundee	8,430	(Scotland) (1 v NI)
1989–90	First round	(Northern Ireland)	Glentoran	1–3	Dundee United	(Scotland)	The Oval, Belfast	5,814	(Scotland) (2 v NI)
1989–90	First round	(Scotland)	Dundee United	2–0	Glentoran	(Northern Ireland)	Tannadice Park, Dundee	9,344	(Scotland) (2 v NI)
1996–97	First round	(Scotland)	Aberdeen	3–1	Barry Town	(Wales)	Pittodrie, Aberdeen	13,400	(Scotland) (1 v WAL)
1996–97	First round	(Wales)	Barry Town	3–3	Aberdeen	(Scotland)	Jenner Park Stadium, Barry	6,500	(Scotland) (1 v WAL)
1997–98	First qualifying round	(Wales)	Inter CableTel	0–3	Celtic	(Scotland)	Ninian Park, Cardiff	6,980	(Scotland) (2 v WAL)
1997–98	First qualifying round	(Scotland)	Celtic	5–0	Inter CableTel	(Wales)	Celtic Park, Glasgow	41,537	(Scotland) (2 v WAL)
1997–98	First round	(Scotland)	Celtic	2–2	Liverpool	(England)	Celtic Park, Glasgow	48,526	(England) (6 v SCO)
1997–98	First round	(England)	Liverpool	(a)0–0	Celtic	(Scotland)	Anfield, Liverpool	38,205	(England) (6 v SCO)
1999–2000	Qualifying round	(Wales)	Cwmbran Town	0–6	Celtic	(Scotland)	Ninian Park, Cardiff	2,000	(Scotland) (3 v WAL)
1999–2000	Qualifying round	(Scotland)	Celtic	4–0	Cwmbran Town	(Wales)	Celtic Park, Glasgow	42,000	(Scotland) (3 v WAL)
2001–02	Qualifying round	(Northern Ireland)	Glenavon	0–1	Kilmarnock	(Scotland)	Mourneview Park, Lurgan	3,000	(Scotland) (3 v NI)
2001–02	Qualifying round	(Scotland)	Kilmarnock	1–0	Glenavon	(Northern Ireland)	Rugby Park, Kilmarnock	7,462	(Scotland) (3 v NI)
2002–03	Second round	(Scotland)	Celtic	1–0	Blackburn Rovers	(England)	Celtic Park, Glasgow	58,553	(Scotland) (2 v ENG)
2002–03	Second round	(England)	Blackburn Rovers	0–2	Celtic	(Scotland)	Ewood Park, Blackburn	29,698	(Scotland) (2 v ENG)
2002–03	Quarter-final	(Scotland)	Celtic	1–1	Liverpool	(England)	Celtic Park, Glasgow	59,759	(Scotland) (3 v ENG)
2002–03	Quarter-final	(England)	Liverpool	0–2	Celtic	(Scotland)	Anfield, Liverpool	44,238	(Scotland) (3 v ENG)
2003–04	Qualifying round	(England)	Manchester City	5–0	Total Network Solutions	(Wales)	City of Manchester Stadium, Manchester	34,103	(England) (1 v WAL)
2003–04	Qualifying round	(Wales)	Total Network Solutions	0–2	Manchester City	(England)	Millennium Stadium, Cardiff	10,103	(England) (1 v WAL)
2009–10	First qualifying round	(Scotland)	Motherwell	0–1	Llanelli	(Wales)	Excelsior Stadium, Airdrie	4,307	(Scotland) (4 v WAL)
2009–10	First qualifying round	(Wales)	Llanelli	0–3	Motherwell	(Scotland)	Parc y Scarlets, Llanelli	3,025	(Scotland) (4 v WAL)
2011–12	First qualifying round	(Wales)	The New Saints	1–1	Cliftonville	(Northern Ireland)	Park Hall, Oswestry	927	(Wales) (1 v NI)
2011–12	First qualifying round	(Northern Ireland)	Cliftonville	0–1	The New Saints	(Wales)	Solitude, Belfast	1,221	(Wales) (1 v NI)
2011–12	Second qualifying round	(Northern Ireland)	Crusaders	1–3	Fulham	(England)	Seaview, Belfast	2,477	(England) (1 v NI)
2011–12	Second qualifying round	(England)	Fulham	4–0	Crusaders	(Northern Ireland)	Craven Cottage, London	15,676	(England) (1 v NI)
2011–12	Play-off round	(Scotland)	Heart of Midlothian	0–5	Tottenham Hotspur	(England)	Tynecastle Stadium, Edinburgh	16,279	(England) (7 v SCO)
2011–12	Play-off round	(England)	Tottenham Hotspur	0–0	Heart of Midlothian	(Scotland)	White Hart Lane, London	32,590	(England) (7 v SCO)
2012–13	Play-off round	(Scotland)	Heart of Midlothian	0–1	Liverpool	(England)	Tynecastle Stadium, Edinburgh	15,965	(England) (8 v SCO)
2012–13	Play-off round	(England)	Liverpool	1–1	Heart of Midlothian	(Scotland)	Anfield, Liverpool	44,361	(England) (8 v SCO)
2015–16	Round of 16	(England)	Liverpool	2–0	Manchester United	(England)	Anfield, Liverpool	43,228	N/A (ENG v ENG, 3)
2015–16	Round of 16	(England)	Manchester United	1–1	Liverpool	(England)	Old Trafford, Manchester	75,180	N/A (ENG v ENG, 3)
2018–19	Second qualifying round	(Scotland)	Aberdeen	1–1	Burnley	(England)	Pittodrie, Aberdeen	20,313	(England) (9 v SCO)
2018–19	Second qualifying round	(England)	Burnley	3–1 (a.e.t.)	Aberdeen	(Scotland)	Turf Moor, Burnley	17,404	(England) (9 v SCO)
2018–19	Final	(England)	Chelsea	4–1	Arsenal	(England)	Olympic Stadium, Baku	51,370	N/A (ENG v ENG, 4)
2019–20	Preliminary round	(Wales)	Barry Town United	0–0	Cliftonville	(Northern Ireland)	International Sports Stadium, Cardiff	2,106	(Northern Ireland) (1 v WAL)
2019–20	Preliminary round	(Northern Ireland)	Cliftonville	4–0	Barry Town United	(Wales)	Solitude, Belfast	1,946	(Northern Ireland) (1 v WAL)
2019–20	First qualifying round	(Wales)	Connah's Quay Nomads	1–2	Kilmarnock	(Scotland)	Belle Vue, Rhyl	1,410	(Wales) (1 v SCO)
2019–20	First qualifying round	(Scotland)	Kilmarnock	0–2	Connah's Quay Nomads	(Wales)	Rugby Park, Kilmarnock	8,306	(Wales) (1 v SCO)
2019–20	Second qualifying round	(England)	Wolverhampton Wanderers	2–0	Crusaders	(Northern Ireland)	Molineux Stadium, Wolverhampton	29,708	(England) (2 v NI)
2019–20	Second qualifying round	(Northern Ireland)	Crusaders	1–4	Wolverhampton Wanderers	(England)	Seaview, Belfast	3,000	(England) (2 v NI)
2020–21	First qualifying round	(Scotland)	Motherwell	5–1	Glentoran	(Northern Ireland)	Fir Park, Motherwell	0	(Scotland) (4 v NI)
2020–21	Second qualifying round	(Northern Ireland)	Coleraine	2–2 (0–3 p)	Motherwell	(Scotland)	The Showgrounds, Coleraine	0	(Scotland) (5 v NI)
2024–25	League phase	(Scotland)	Rangers	1–1	Tottenham Hotspur	(England)	Ibrox Stadium, Glasgow	48,064	N/A (SCO v ENG, 12)
2024–25	League phase	(England)	Manchester United	2–1	Rangers	(Scotland)	Old Trafford, Manchester	73,288	(England) (10 v SCO)
2024–25	Final	(England)	Tottenham Hotspur	1–0	Manchester United	(England)	San Mamés, Bilbao	49,224	N/A (ENG v ENG, 5)
2025–26	Semi-finals	(England)	Nottingham Forest	1–0	Aston Villa	(England)	City Ground, Nottingham	29,790	N/A (ENG v ENG, 6)
2025–26	Semi-finals	(England)	Aston Villa	4–0	Nottingham Forest	(England)	Villa Park, Birmingham	43,028	N/A (ENG v ENG, 6)

== UEFA Europa Conference League/UEFA Conference League ==
Season	Round		Team 1	Score	Team 2		Venue	Attendance	Win for
2021–22	First qualifying round	(Northern Ireland)	Glentoran	1–1	The New Saints	(Wales)	The Oval, Belfast	1,021	(Wales) (1 v NIR)
2021–22	First qualifying round	(Wales)	The New Saints	2–0	Glentoran	(Northern Ireland)	Park Hall, Oswestry	198	(Wales) (1 v NIR)
2021–22	First qualifying round	(Wales)	Bala Town	0–1	Larne	(Northern Ireland)	Maes Tegid, Bala	197	(Northern Ireland) (1 v WAL)
2021–22	First qualifying round	(Northern Ireland)	Larne	1–0	Bala Town	(Wales)	Inver Park, Larne	850	(Northern Ireland) (1 v WAL)
2023–24	Play-off round								
2023–24	Play-off round	(Scotland)	Hibernian	0–5	Aston Villa	(England)	Easter Road, Edinburgh	19,306	(England) (1 v SCO)
2023–24	Play-off round	(England)	Aston Villa	3–0	Hibernian	(Scotland)	Villa Park, Birmingham	39,467	(England) (1 v SCO)
2024–25	First qualifying round								
2024–25	First qualifying round	(Wales)	Caernarfon Town	2–0	Crusaders	(Northern Ireland)	Nantporth, Bangor	1,088	(Wales) (2 v NIR)
2024–25	First qualifying round	(Northern Ireland)	Crusaders	3–1 (7–8 p)	Caernarfon Town	(Wales)	Seaview, Belfast	2,184	(Wales) (2 v NIR)

== Inter-Cities Fairs Cup ==
Season	Round		Team 1	Score	Team 2		Venue	Attendance	Win for
1962–63	First round	(England)	Everton	1–0	Dunfermline Athletic	(Scotland)	Goodison Park, Liverpool	40,240	(Scotland) (1 v ENG)
1962–63	First round	(Scotland)	Dunfermline Athletic	2–0	Everton	(England)	East End Park, Dunfermline	21,813	(Scotland) (1 v ENG)
1963–64	First round	(Northern Ireland)	Glentoran	1–4	Partick Thistle	(Scotland)	The Oval, Belfast	5,000	(Scotland) (1 v NI)
1963–64	First round	(Scotland)	Partick Thistle	3–0	Glentoran	(Northern Ireland)	Firhill Stadium, Glasgow	7,000	(Scotland) (1 v NI)
1964–65	First round	(Scotland)	Kilmarnock	0–2	Everton	(England)	Rugby Park, Kilmarnock	23,561	(England) (1 v SCO)
1964–65	First round	(England)	Everton	4–1	Kilmarnock	(Scotland)	Goodison Park, Liverpool	30,730	(England) (1 v SCO)
1964–65	Third round	(England)	Manchester United	1–1	Everton	(England)	Old Trafford, Manchester	50,000	N/A (ENG v ENG, 1)
1964–65	Third round	(England)	Everton	1–2	Manchester United	(England)	Goodison Park, Liverpool	54,397	N/A (ENG v ENG, 1)
1966–67	Semi-final	(England)	Leeds United	4–2	Kilmarnock	(Scotland)	Elland Road, Leeds	43,000	(England) (2 v SCO)
1966–67	Semi-final	(Scotland)	Kilmarnock	0–0	Leeds United	(England)	Rugby Park, Kilmarnock	24,831	(England) (2 v SCO)
1967–68	First round	(England)	Leeds United	1–0	Hibernian	(Scotland)	Elland Road, Leeds	31,522	(England) (3 v SCO)
1967–68	First round	(Scotland)	Hibernian	1–1	Leeds United	(England)	Easter Road, Edinburgh	40,503	(England) (3 v SCO)
1967–68	Quarter-final	(Scotland)	Rangers	0–0	Leeds United	(England)	Ibrox, Glasgow	85,000	(England) (4 v SCO)
1967–68	Quarter-final	(England)	Leeds United	2–0	Rangers	(Scotland)	Elland Road, Leeds	50,498	(England) (4 v SCO)
1967–68	Semi-final	(Scotland)	Dundee	1–1	Leeds United	(England)	Dens Park, Dundee	30,000	(England) (5 v SCO)
1967–68	Semi-final	(England)	Leeds United	1–0	Dundee	(Scotland)	Elland Road, Leeds	23,830	(England) (5 v SCO)
1968–69	First round	(England)	Chelsea	5–0	Morton	(Scotland)	Stamford Bridge, London	28,736	(England) (6 v SCO)
1968–69	First round	(Scotland)	Morton	3–4	Chelsea	(England)	Cappielow Park, Greenock	8,000	(England) (6 v SCO)
1968–69	Semi-final	(Scotland)	Rangers	0–0	Newcastle United	(England)	Ibrox, Glasgow	75,518	(England) (7 v SCO)
1968–69	Semi-final	(England)	Newcastle United	2–0	Rangers	(Scotland)	St. James' Park, Newcastle	59,303	(England) (7 v SCO)
1969–70	First round	(Scotland)	Dundee United	1–2	Newcastle United	(England)	Tannadice Park, Dundee	15,500	(England) (8 v SCO)
1969–70	First round	(England)	Newcastle United	1–0	Dundee United	(Scotland)	St. James' Park, Newcastle	37,470	(England) (8 v SCO)
1969–70	First round	(England)	Arsenal	3–0	Glentoran	(Northern Ireland)	Highbury Stadium, London	24,292	(England) (1 v NI)
1969–70	First round	(Northern Ireland)	Glentoran	1–0	Arsenal	(England)	The Oval, Belfast	13,000	(England) (1 v NI)
1969–70	Third round	(England)	Newcastle United	0–0	Southampton	(England)	St. James' Park, Newcastle	37,580	N/A (ENG v ENG, 2)
1969–70	Third round	(England)	Southampton	1–1(a)	Newcastle United	(England)	The Dell, Southampton	25,182	N/A (ENG v ENG, 2)
1970–71	First round	(Northern Ireland)	Coleraine	1–1	Kilmarnock	(Scotland)	The Showgrouds, Coleraine	5,000	(Northern Ireland) (1 v SCO)
1970–71	First round	(Scotland)	Kilmarnock	2–3	Coleraine	(Northern Ireland)	Rugby Park, Kilmarnock	5,911	(Northern Ireland) (1 v SCO)
1970–71	Third round	(Scotland)	Hibernian	0–1	Liverpool	(England)	Easter Road, Edinburgh	30,296	(England) (9 v SCO)
1970–71	Third round	(England)	Liverpool	2–0	Hibernian	(Scotland)	Anfield, Liverpool	37/815	(England) (9 v SCO)
1970–71	Semi-final	(England)	Liverpool	0–1	Leeds United	(England)	Anfield, Liverpool	52,877	N/A (ENG v ENG, 3)
1970–71	Semi-final	(England)	Leeds United	0–0	Liverpool	(England)	Elland Road, Leeds	40,462	N/A (ENG v ENG, 3)

== European/UEFA Cup Winners' Cup ==
Season	Round		Team 1	Score	Team 2		Venue	Attendance	Win for
1960–61	Semi-final	(Scotland)	Rangers	2–0	Wolverhampton Wanderers	(England)	Ibrox, Glasgow	79,229	(Scotland) (1 v ENG)
1960–61	Semi-final	(England)	Wolverhampton Wanderers	1–1	Rangers	(Scotland)	Molineux, Wolverhampton	45,163	(Scotland) (1 v ENG)
1961–62	Premiminary round	(Northern Ireland)	Glenavon	1–4	Leicester City	(England)	Mourneview Park, Lurgan	10,000	(England) (1 v NI)
1961–62	Premiminary round	(England)	Leicester City	3–1	Glenavon	(Northern Ireland)	Filbert Street, Leicester	10,455	(England) (1 v NI)
1962–63	First round	(England)	Tottenham Hotspur	5–2	Rangers	(Scotland)	White Hart Lane, London	58,859	(England) (1 v SCO)
1962–63	First round	(Scotland)	Rangers	2–3	Tottenham Hotspur	(England)	Ibrox, Glasgow	80,000	(England) (1 v SCO)
1963–64	Second round	(England)	Tottenham Hotspur	2–0	Manchester United	(England)	White Hart Lane, London	57,447	N/A (ENG v ENG, 1)
1963–64	Second round	(England)	Manchester United	4–1	Tottenham Hotspur	(England)	Old Trafford, Manchester	48,639	N/A (ENG v ENG, 1)
1965–66	Semi-final	(Scotland)	Celtic	1–0	Liverpool	(England)	Celtic Park, Glasgow	80,000	(England) (2 v SCO)
1965–66	Semi-final	(England)	Liverpool	2–0	Celtic	(Scotland)	Anfield, Liverpool	54,208	(England) (2 v SCO)
1966–67	First round	(Northern Ireland)	Glentoran	1–1	Rangers	(Scotland)	The Oval, Belfast	35,000	(Scotland) (1 v NI)
1966–67	First round	(Scotland)	Rangers	4–0	Glentoran	(Northern Ireland)	Ibrox, Glasgow	40,000	(Scotland) (1 v NI)
1968–69	Quarter-final	(Scotland)	Dunfermline Athletic	0–0	West Bromwich Albion	(England)	East End Park, Dunfermline	26,000	(Scotland) (2 v ENG)
1968–69	Quarter-final	(England)	West Bromwich Albion	0–1	Dunfermline Athletic	(Scotland)	The Hawthorns, West Bromwich	32,373	(Scotland) (2 v ENG)
1970–71	First round	(England)	Manchester City	1–0	Linfield	(Northern Ireland)	Maine Road, Manchester	25,184	(England) (2 v NI)
1970–71	First round	(Northern Ireland)	Linfield	2–1(a)	Manchester City	(England)	Windsor Park, Belfast	24,000	(England) (2 v NI)
1970–71	Semi-final	(England)	Chelsea	1–0	Manchester City	(England)	Stamford Bridge, London	45,955	N/A (ENG v ENG, 2)
1970–71	Semi-final	(England)	Manchester City	0–1	Chelsea	(England)	Maine Road, Manchester	43,663	N/A (ENG v ENG, 2)
1976–77	Second round	(Northern Ireland)	Carrick Rangers	2–5	Southampton	(England)	Taylors Avenue, Carrickfergus	6,500	(England) (3 v NI)
1976–77	Second round	(England)	Southampton	4–1	Carrick Rangers	(Northern Ireland)	The Dell, Southampton	15,130	(England) (3 v NI)
1980–81	First round	(Wales)	Newport County	4–0	Crusaders	(Northern Ireland)	Somerton Park, Newport	6,285	(Wales) (1 v NI)
1980–81	First round	(Northern Ireland)	Crusaders	0–0	Newport County	(Wales)	Seaview, Belfast	2,000	(Wales) (1 v NI)
1982–83	First round	(Northern Ireland)	Coleraine	0–3	Tottenham Hotspur	(England)	The Showgrounds, Coleraine	12,000	(England) (4 v NI)
1982–83	First round	(England)	Tottenham Hotspur	4–0	Coleraine	(Northern Ireland)	White Hart Lane, London	20,925	(England) (4 v NI)
1990–91	Second round	(England)	Manchester United	3–0	Wrexham	(Wales)	Old Trafford, Manchester	29,405	(England) (1 v WAL)
1990–91	Second round	(Wales)	Wrexham	0–2	Manchester United	(England)	Racecourse Ground, Wrexham	13,327	(England) (1 v WAL)

== Results tables ==
The statistics from all matches played by clubs of each nation against the others is shown below.

As of 21 May 2025

=== England ===
England is the only nation whose teams have played against each other, in 22 ties (41 matches, three being single-game finals) across four competitions.

Opponent nationality	ECC/UCL						UEFA/UEL						UECL/UCL						ICFC						ECWC						ALL					
Opponent nationality	P	W	D	L	F	A	P	W	D	L	F	A	P	W	D	L	F	A	P	W	D	L	F	A	P	W	D	L	F	A	P	W	D	L	F	A
(Northern Ireland)	2	2	0	0	7	0	4	4	0	0	13	2	0	0	0	0	0	0	2	1	0	1	3	1	8	7	0	1	25	7	16	14	0	2	48	10
(Scotland)	21	12	4	5	42	19	26	8	13	5	34	26	2	2	0	0	8	0	20	14	5	1	38	13	8	3	2	3	11	9	77	39	24	14	134	67
(Wales)	2	2	0	0	6	0	2	2	0	0	7	0	0	0	0	0	0	0	0	0	0	0	0	0	2	2	0	0	5	0	6	6	0	0	18	0
Totals	25	16	4	5	55	19	32	14	13	5	54	28	2	2	0	0	8	0	22	15	5	1	41	14	18	12	2	4	41	16	99	59	24	16	198	77

=== Northern Ireland ===
Opponent nationality	ECC/UCL						UEFA/UEL						UECL/UCL						ICFC						ECWC						ALL					
Opponent nationality	P	W	D	L	F	A	P	W	D	L	F	A	P	W	D	L	F	A	P	W	D	L	F	A	P	W	D	L	F	A	P	W	D	L	F	A
(England)	2	0	0	2	0	7	4	0	0	4	2	13	0	0	0	0	0	0	2	1	0	1	1	3	8	1	0	7	7	25	16	2	0	14	10	48
(Scotland)	4	0	0	4	0	11	8	0	1	7	5	18	0	0	0	0	0	0	4	1	1	2	5	10	2	0	1	1	1	5	18	1	3	14	11	44
(Wales)	2	1	0	1	2	1	4	1	2	1	5	2	6	3	1	2	6	6	0	0	0	0	0	0	2	0	1	1	0	4	12	4	4	4	10	10
Totals	8	1	0	7	2	19	16	1	3	12	12	33	6	3	1	2	6	6	6	2	1	3	6	13	12	1	2	9	8	34	48	8	7	33	34	105

=== Scotland ===
Opponent nationality	ECC/UCL						UEFA/UEL						UECL/UCL						ICFC						ECWC						ALL					
Opponent nationality	P	W	D	L	F	A	P	W	D	L	F	A	P	W	D	L	F	A	P	W	D	L	F	A	P	W	D	L	F	A	P	W	D	L	F	A
(England)	21	5	4	12	19	42	26	5	13	8	26	34	2	0	0	2	0	8	20	1	5	14	13	38	8	3	2	3	9	11	77	14	24	39	67	134
(Northern Ireland)	4	4	0	0	11	0	8	7	1	0	18	5	0	0	0	0	0	0	0	2	1	1	10	5	2	1	1	0	5	1	18	14	3	1	44	11
(Wales)	0	0	0	0	0	0	10	7	1	2	29	8	0	0	0	0	0	0	0	0	0	0	0	0	0	0	0	0	0	0	10	7	1	2	29	8
Totals	25	9	4	12	30	42	44	19	15	10	73	45	2	0	0	2	0	8	24	3	6	15	23	43	10	4	3	3	14	12	105	35	28	42	140	153

=== Wales ===
Opponent nationality	ECC/UCL						UEFA/UEL						UECL/UCL						ICFC						ECWC						ALL					
Opponent nationality	P	W	D	L	F	A	P	W	D	L	F	A	P	W	D	L	F	A	P	W	D	L	F	A	P	W	D	L	F	A	P	W	D	L	F	A
(England)	2	0	0	2	0	6	2	0	0	2	0	7	0	0	0	0	0	0	0	0	0	0	0	0	2	0	0	2	0	5	6	0	0	6	0	18
(Northern Ireland)	2	1	0	1	1	2	4	1	2	1	2	5	6	2	1	3	6	6	0	0	0	0	0	0	2	1	1	0	4	0	14	5	4	5	13	13
(Scotland)	0	0	0	0	0	0	10	2	1	7	8	29	0	0	0	0	0	0	0	0	0	0	0	0	0	0	0	0	0	0	10	2	1	7	8	29
Totals	4	1	0	3	1	8	16	3	3	10	10	41	6	2	1	3	6	6	0	0	0	0	0	0	4	1	1	2	4	5	30	7	5	18	21	60

== British overseas territories ==
Since 2013, the Gibraltar Football Association has been a member of UEFA enabling them to enter team into UEFA competitions representing Gibraltar, a British overseas territory. The first tie between a team from Gibraltar and a side from the United Kingdom was a second qualifying round Champions League tie between Celtic, of Scotland, and Lincoln Red Imps; Celtic won the tie 3–1 on aggregate after a shock 1–0 loss in the first leg.

The first meeting between a Gibraltarian and a Welsh side was played in the first qualifying round of the Champions League between Europa and The New Saints in 2017; TNS played Lincoln Red Imps in the second qualifying round of the Europa League in 2018.

=== UEFA Champions League ===
Season	Round	Flag	Team 1	Score	Team 2	Flag	Venue	Attendance	Win for
2016–17	Second qualifying round	(Gibraltar)	Lincoln Red Imps	1–0	Celtic	(Scotland)	Victoria Stadium, Gibraltar	1,632	(Scotland) (1 v GIB)
2016–17	Second qualifying round	(Scotland)	Celtic	3–0	Lincoln Red Imps	(Gibraltar)	Celtic Park, Glasgow	55,632	(Scotland) (1 v GIB)
2017–18	First qualifying round	(Wales)	The New Saints	1–2	Europa	(Gibraltar)	Park Hall, Oswestry	1,148	(Wales) (1 v GIB)
2017–18	First qualifying round	(Gibraltar)	Europa	1–3	The New Saints	(Wales)	Estádio Algarve, Faro	261	(Wales) (1 v GIB)

=== UEFA Europa League ===
Season	Round	Flag	Team 1	Score	Team 2	Flag	Venue	Attendance	Win for
2018–19	Second qualifying round	(Wales)	The New Saints	2–1	Lincoln Red Imps	(Gibraltar)	Park Hall, Oswestry	632	(Wales) (1 v GIB)
2018–19	Second qualifying round	(Gibraltar)	Lincoln Red Imps	1–1	The New Saints	(Wales)	Victoria Stadium, Gibraltar	546	(Wales) (1 v GIB)
2019–20	First qualifying round	(Gibraltar)	St Joseph's	0–4	Rangers	(Scotland)	Victoria Stadium, Gibraltar	2,050	(Scotland) (1 v GIB)
2019–20	First qualifying round	(Scotland)	Rangers	6–0	St Joseph's	(Gibraltar)	Ibrox Stadium, Glasgow	45,718	(Scotland) (1 v GIB)
2020–21	Second qualifying round	(Gibraltar)	Lincoln Red Imps	0–5	Rangers	(Scotland)	Victoria Stadium, Gibraltar	0	(Scotland) (2 v GIB)

=== UEFA Conference League ===
Season	Round	Flag	Team 1	Score	Team 2	Flag	Venue	Attendance	Win for
2022–23	First qualifying round	(Gibraltar)	St Joseph's	0–0	Larne	(Northern Ireland)	Victoria Stadium, Gibraltar	677	(Gibraltar) (1 v NI)
2022–23	First qualifying round	(Northern Ireland)	Larne	0–1	St Joseph's	(Gibraltar)	Inver Park, Larne	1,823	(Gibraltar) (1 v NI)
2022–23	First qualifying round	(Gibraltar)	Bruno's Magpies	2–1	Crusaders	(Northern Ireland)	Victoria Stadium, Gibraltar	554	(Northern Ireland) (1 v GIB)
2022–23	First qualifying round	(Northern Ireland)	Crusaders	3–1	Bruno's Magpies	(Gibraltar)	Seaview, Belfast	1,745	(Northern Ireland) (1 v GIB)
2024–25	Play-off round	(Gibraltar)	Lincoln Red Imps	2–1	Larne	(Northern Ireland)	Estádio Algarve, Faro	220	(Northern Ireland) (2 v GIB)
2024–25	Play-off round	(Northern Ireland)	Larne	3–1	Lincoln Red Imps	(Gibraltar)	Inver Park, Larne	2,462	(Northern Ireland) (2 v GIB)
2025–26	First qualifying round	(Gibraltar)	St Joseph's	2–2	Cliftonville	(Northern Ireland)	Europa Sports Park, Gibraltar	758	(Gibraltar) (2 v NI)
2025–26	First qualifying round	(Northern Ireland)	Cliftonville	2–3 (a.e.t.)	St Joseph's	(Gibraltar)	Solitude, Belfast	2,386	(Gibraltar) (2 v NI)
2026–27	Play-off round	(Gibraltar)	Lincoln Red Imps	0–2	Larne	(Northern Ireland)	Europa Sports Park, Gibraltar	646	(Gibraltar) (3 v NI)
2026–27	Play-off round	(Northern Ireland)	Larne	0–3 (a.e.t.)	Lincoln Red Imps	(Gibraltar)	Inver Park, Larne	1,808	(Gibraltar) (3 v NI)

=== Results table ===
As of 27 August 2026

Opponent nationality	ECC/UCL						UEFA/UEL						UECL/UCL						ALL					
Opponent nationality	P	W	D	L	F	A	P	W	D	L	F	A	P	W	D	L	F	A	P	W	D	L	F	A
(England)	0	0	0	0	0	0	0	0	0	0	0	0	0	0	0	0	0	0	0	0	0	0	0	0
(Northern Ireland)	0	0	0	0	0	0	0	0	0	0	0	0	10	5	2	3	15	14	10	5	2	3	15	14
(Scotland)	2	1	0	1	1	3	3	0	0	3	0	15	0	0	0	0	0	0	5	1	0	4	1	18
(Wales)	2	1	0	1	3	4	2	0	1	1	2	3	0	0	0	0	0	0	4	1	1	2	5	7
Totals	4	2	0	2	4	7	5	0	1	4	2	18	10	5	2	3	15	14	19	7	3	9	21	39

== Derry City F.C. ==
Derry City is a football club based in the city of Derry in Northern Ireland. However, for cultural reasons, the club withdrew from senior football in Northern Ireland and has, since 1985, played as part of the league system in the Republic of Ireland. Derry City has had a number of European campaigns, representing both Northern Ireland and the Republic of Ireland during its history, and has played against a number of clubs from the constituent countries of the United Kingdom and Gibraltar.

Competition	Season	Round	Flag	Team 1	Score	Team 2	Flag	Venue	Attendance	Win for
European Cup Winners' Cup	1988–89	First round	(Republic of Ireland)	Derry City	0–0	Cardiff City	(Wales)	Brandywell Stadium, Derry	7,820	(Wales) (1 v IRE)
European Cup Winners' Cup	1988–89	First round	(Wales)	Cardiff City	4–0	Derry City	(Republic of Ireland)	Ninian Park, Cardiff	6,933	(Wales) (1 v IRE)
UEFA Cup	2006–07	Second qualifying round	(Scotland)	Gretna	1–5	Derry City	(Republic of Ireland)	Fir Park, Motherwell	6,040	(Republic of Ireland) (1 v SCO)
UEFA Cup	2006–07	Second qualifying round	(Republic of Ireland)	Derry City	2–2	Gretna	(Scotland)	Brandywell Stadium, Derry	2,850	(Republic of Ireland) (1 v SCO)
UEFA Europa League	2014–15	First qualifying round	(Republic of Ireland)	Derry City	4–0	Aberystwyth Town	(Wales)	Brandywell Stadium, Derry	1,980	(Republic of Ireland) (1 v WAL)
UEFA Europa League	2014–15	First qualifying round	(Wales)	Aberystwyth Town	0–5	Derry City	(Republic of Ireland)	Park Avenue, Aberystwyth	1,046	(Republic of Ireland) (1 v WAL)
UEFA Conference League	2024–25	First qualifying round	(Gibraltar)	Bruno's Magpies	2–0	Derry City	(Republic of Ireland)	Europa Sports Park, Gibraltar	725	(Gibraltar) (1 v IRE)
UEFA Conference League	2024–25	First qualifying round	(Republic of Ireland)	Derry City	2–1 (a.e.t.)	Bruno's Magpies	(Gibraltar)	Brandywell Stadium, Derry	2,568	(Gibraltar) (1 v IRE)

=== Results table ===
Opponent nationality	ECC/UCL						ECWC						UEFA/UEL						UECL/UCL						ALL					
Opponent nationality	P	W	D	L	F	A	P	W	D	L	F	A	P	W	D	L	F	A	P	W	D	L	F	A	P	W	D	L	F	A
(England)	0	0	0	0	0	0	0	0	0	0	0	0	0	0	0	0	0	0	0	0	0	0	0	0	0	0	0	0	0	0
(Northern Ireland)	0	0	0	0	0	0	0	0	0	0	0	0	0	0	0	0	0	0	0	0	0	0	0	0	0	0	0	0	0	0
(Scotland)	0	0	0	0	0	0	0	0	0	0	0	0	2	1	1	0	7	3	0	0	0	0	0	0	2	1	1	0	7	3
(Wales)	0	0	0	0	0	0	2	0	1	1	0	4	2	2	0	0	9	0	0	0	0	0	0	0	4	2	1	1	9	4
(Gibraltar)	0	0	0	0	0	0	0	0	0	0	0	0	0	0	0	0	0	0	2	1	0	1	2	3	2	1	0	1	2	3
Totals	0	0	0	0	0	0	2	0	1	1	0	4	4	3	1	0	16	3	2	1	0	1	2	3	8	4	2	2	18	10

== See also ==
- List of football matches between teams from Northern Ireland and the Republic of Ireland
- List of football matches between British national teams
- Northern Irish football clubs in European competitions
- Scottish football clubs in international competitions
- English football clubs in international competitions
- Coronation Cup (football), 1953, held in Glasgow
- Empire Exhibition Trophy, 1938, held in Glasgow
- British League Cup, 1902, held in Glasgow
- Football World Championship
- Anglo-Scottish Cup
- Texaco Cup
