= 2026–27 CONCACAF Nations League C =

Tournament details
- Dates: Group phase: 23 September – 6 October 2026; League Championship: 9–12 June 2027
- Teams: 9

Tournament statistics
- Matches played: 18
- Goals scored: 69 (3.83 per match)
- Top scorer: (Collectivity of Saint Martin) Axel Raga (7 goals)
- All statistics correct as of 6 October 2026.

The 2026–27 CONCACAF Nations League C is the third and lowest division of the 2026–27 edition of the CONCACAF Nations League, the fifth season of the international football competition involving the men's national teams of the 41 member associations of CONCACAF. The initial group stage was held from 23 September to 6 October 2026.

League C will culminate with the League Championship in June 2027 to crown the champions of League C.

== Format ==
Starting this season, CONCACAF introduced a final round following the group stage for Leagues B and C in order to determine a winner for each league, similar to the format used in League A. The group stage maintained the same format, with the nine teams divided into three groups of three, and each group playing on a double round-robin basis. Group stage matches continued to be played at centralized venues, as decided in the previous season, in the official FIFA match windows of September–October 2026. The first-placed team of each group and the best second-placed team among all groups was promoted to the 2028–29 CONCACAF Nations League B and advanced to the Nations League C Finals. They also advanced to the play-in round, in which they joined four teams from League A in order to compete to qualify for the 2027 CONCACAF Gold Cup qualification tournament.

The Nations League C Finals will consists of a semi-final round, third place play-off and the final match, and will be played in June 2027 at a centralized venue to be determined by CONCACAF. Originally scheduled for March, the Finals were rescheduled due to Aruba's qualification for the CONCACAF Gold Cup qualifiers which are also scheduled for March.

=== 2027 CONCACAF Gold Cup qualification ===
As announced by CONCACAF in February 2026, the 2026–27 CONCACAF Nations League will serve as a qualifier for the 2027 CONCACAF Gold Cup. League C teams could not qualify directly for the 2027 CONCACAF Gold Cup, but they can do so through the Gold Cup qualification tournament (also called CONCACAF Gold Cup prelims) as long as they advance past the Play-in round.

== Teams ==
A total of nine national teams contest League C, including the five sides that failed to be promoted last season and four teams relegated from the 2024–25 League B.

=== Team changes ===
The following are the team changes in League C regarding the 2024–25 season:

Incoming
Relegated from
Nations League B
- Aruba
- Antigua and Barbuda
- Montserrat
- Saint Martin

Outgoing
Promoted to
Nations League B
- Barbados
- Belize
- Cayman Islands
- Saint Kitts and Nevis

=== Seeding ===
The pots were confirmed on 21 July 2026, with the nine League C teams being split into three pots of three teams, based on the CONCACAF Rankings as of 20 July 2026.

Pot 1
Team	Rank	Pts
Montserrat	28	720
Saint Martin	31	584
Antigua and Barbuda	33	553

Pot 2
Team	Rank	Pts
Aruba	35	542
Bahamas	37	387
Turks and Caicos Islands	38	272

Pot 3
Team	Rank	Pts
British Virgin Islands	39	160
Anguilla	40	149
U.S. Virgin Islands	41	116

=== Draw ===
External videos
- Official Draw | 2026/27 Concacaf Nations League

The draw for the groups composition was held on 23 July 2026, 19:00 EDT (UTC−4), in Miami, Florida, United States, where the nine involved teams were drawn into three groups of three. The draw began by randomly selecting a team from Pot 1 and placing them in Group A and then selecting the remaining teams from Pot 1 and placing them into groups B and C in sequential order. The draw continued with the same procedure done for the remaining pots.

The draw resulted in the following groups:

Group A
Pos	Team
A1	Montserrat
A2	Turks and Caicos Islands
A3	British Virgin Islands

Group B
Pos	Team
B1	Antigua and Barbuda
B2	Aruba
B3	Anguilla

Group C
Pos	Team
C1	Saint Martin
C2	Bahamas
C3	U.S. Virgin Islands

== Group stage ==
The hosts for group stage matches were chosen based on the CONCACAF Rankings (as of 20 July 2026) used to seed the teams prior to the draw.

The highest-ranked national association will host all matches in its respective group, which are scheduled during the September–October 2026 FIFA match window. If a national association was unable to host matches, the second highest-ranked national association would be the host and then the third-ranked national association, if necessary. In all cases, an alternative neutral venue could be selected, subject to CONCACAF approval. The match schedule was predetermined to provide proper rest time in between matches.

September–October FIFA Window
Mon 21	Tue 22	Wed 23	Thu 24	Fri 25	Sat 26	Sun 27	Mon 28	Tue 29	Wed 30	Thu 1	Fri 2	Sat 3	Sun 4	Mon 5	Tue 6
—N/a		2 v 1	Rest days		1 v 3	Rest days		3 v 2	Rest day	3 v 1	Rest days		2 v 3	Rest day	1 v 2

The fixture list was confirmed by CONCACAF on 24 July 2026. All match times are in EDT (UTC−4) as listed by CONCACAF (local times, if different, are in parentheses).

=== Group A ===
Pos	Team	Pld	W	D	L	GF	GA	GD	Pts	Qualification or relegation	(Montserrat)	(Turks and Caicos Islands)	(British Virgin Islands)
1	Montserrat (P)	4	4	0	0	11	1	+10	12	Promotion to League B, advance to play-in and semi-finals	—	4–1	3–0
2	Turks and Caicos Islands (H)	4	2	0	2	7	6	+1	6		0–2	—	3–0
3	British Virgin Islands	4	0	0	4	0	11	−11	0		0–2	0–3	—

Source: CONCACAF
Rules for classification: Tiebreakers
(H) Hosts; (P) Promoted
23 September 2026
15:00

Turks and Caicos Islands	0–2	Montserrat
	Report	Boatswain 41', 69'

TCIFA National Academy, Providenciales
Referee: Jordan Chaibriant (Guadeloupe)

26 September 2026
15:00

Montserrat	3–0	British Virgin Islands
Barzey 58'; Taylor 67', 71'	Report

TCIFA National Academy, Providenciales (Turks and Caicos Islands)
Attendance: 120
Referee: Evens Julmis (Bahamas)

29 September 2026
15:00

British Virgin Islands	0–3	Turks and Caicos Islands
	Report	Forbes 9', 74'; Paul 52'

TCIFA National Academy, Providenciales (Turks and Caicos Islands)
Attendance: 152
Referee: César Nolasco (El Salvador)

1 October 2026
16:00

British Virgin Islands	0–2	Montserrat
	Report	Barzey 11'; Mars 43' (o.g.)

TCIFA National Academy, Providenciales (Turks and Caicos Islands)
Attendance: 102
Referee: Renlee Napoleon (Saint Lucia)

4 October 2026
15:00

Turks and Caicos Islands	3–0	British Virgin Islands
Hutchinson 37'; Robertson 90+2'; Clare 90+6' (pen.)	Report

TCIFA National Academy, Providenciales
Attendance: 412
Referee: Akil Weeks (Trinidad and Tobago)

6 October 2026
16:00

Montserrat	4–1	Turks and Caicos Islands
Taylor 3' (pen.), 45+4' (pen.); Baker 82'; Boatswain 90'	Report	Forbes 81'

TCIFA National Academy, Providenciales (Turks and Caicos Islands)
Referee: Alexi Perry (Jamaica)

=== Group B ===
Pos	Team	Pld	W	D	L	GF	GA	GD	Pts	Qualification or relegation	(Antigua and Barbuda)	(Aruba)	(Anguilla)
1	Antigua and Barbuda (H, P)	4	3	0	1	11	3	+8	9	Promotion to League B, advance to play-in and semi-finals	—	3–2	5–0
2	Aruba (P)	4	3	0	1	8	5	+3	9	Promotion to League B, advance to play-in and semi-finals	1–0	—	3–2
3	Anguilla	4	0	0	4	2	13	−11	0		0–3	0–2	—

Source: CONCACAF
Rules for classification: Tiebreakers
(H) Hosts; (P) Promoted
23 September 2026
19:00

Aruba	1–0	Antigua and Barbuda
Molina 90+3'	Report

Sir Vivian Richards Stadium, North Sound (Antigua and Barbuda)
Attendance: 1,032
Referee: Olivier Jean Alexandre (Haiti)

26 September 2026
19:00

Antigua and Barbuda	5–0	Anguilla
Douglas 1', 21'; Pereira 16'; Bishop 35'; George 43'	Report

Sir Vivian Richards Stadium, North Sound
Attendance: 3,674
Referee: Wikelson Bonnet (Haiti)

29 September 2026
19:00

Anguilla	0–2	Aruba
	Report	Ostiana 53'; Figaroa 88'

Sir Vivian Richards Stadium, North Sound (Antigua and Barbuda)
Attendance: 117
Referee: Hakeem Harvey (Saint Kitts and Nevis)

1 October 2026
19:00

Anguilla	0–3	Antigua and Barbuda
	Report	Bishop 35', 64'; Tomlinson 74'

Sir Vivian Richards Stadium, North Sound (Antigua and Barbuda)
Attendance: 873
Referee: Mendy Pierre (Martinique)

4 October 2026
19:00

Aruba	3–2	Anguilla
Fermina 7'; Mercera 90+3'; Peterson 90+4'	Report	Owen 39'; Fleming 77'

Sir Vivian Richards Stadium, North Sound (Antigua and Barbuda)
Attendance: 137
Referee: Juan Morales (Guatemala)

6 October 2026
19:00

Antigua and Barbuda	3–2	Aruba
Tomlinson 5'; Bramble 11'; Satchell 86'	Report	Bennett 14'; Fermina 50'

Sir Vivian Richards Stadium, North Sound
Referee: Melvin Matamoros (Honduras)

=== Group C ===
Pos	Team	Pld	W	D	L	GF	GA	GD	Pts	Qualification or relegation	(Collectivity of Saint Martin)	(United States Virgin Islands)	(The Bahamas)
1	Saint Martin (P)	4	3	0	1	19	2	+17	9	Promotion to League B, advance to play-in and semi-finals	—	0–2	6–0
2	U.S. Virgin Islands (H)	4	3	0	1	8	8	0	9		0–5	—	3–1
3	Bahamas	4	0	0	4	3	20	−17	0		0–8	2–3	—

Source: CONCACAF
Rules for classification: Tiebreakers
(H) Hosts; (P) Promoted
23 September 2026
16:00

Bahamas	0–8	Saint Martin
	Report	Raga 15', 52', 63' (pen.); Alexandre 20', 32'; Montantin 23'; Butler 41' (o.g.); Arné 80'

Bethlehem Soccer Stadium, Upper Bethlehem (U.S. Virgin Islands)
Referee: Vimarest Díaz (Dominican Republic)

26 September 2026
16:00

Saint Martin	0–2	U.S. Virgin Islands
	Report	Liburd 18', 83'

Bethlehem Soccer Stadium, Upper Bethlehem (U.S. Virgin Islands)
Attendance: 314
Referee: Amaury Majors (Bermuda)

29 September 2026
16:00

U.S. Virgin Islands	3–1	Bahamas
St. Louis 14'; Joseph 45+3'; Armour 62'	Report	Rahming 68'

Bethlehem Soccer Stadium, Upper Bethlehem
Attendance: 332
Referee: Okeito Nicholson (Jamaica)

1 October 2026
16:00

U.S. Virgin Islands	0–5	Saint Martin
	Report	Raga 44'; Denis 49'; Arné 83', 86', 89'

Bethlehem Soccer Stadium, Upper Bethlehem
Attendance: 333
Referee: Jonathan Leitón (Costa Rica)

4 October 2026
16:00

Bahamas	2–3	U.S. Virgin Islands
Bayles 58'; Julmis 90+2' (pen.)	Report	Henry 30', 52'; Chemaly 35' (o.g.)

Bethlehem Soccer Stadium, Upper Bethlehem (U.S. Virgin Islands)
Attendance: 325
Referee: Róger Vindas (Costa Rica)

6 October 2026
16:00

Saint Martin	6–0	Bahamas
Raga 15', 77', 90+1'; Arné 24'; Makhabe 38'; Alexandre 50' (pen.)	Report

Bethlehem Soccer Stadium, Upper Bethlehem (U.S. Virgin Islands)
Referee: James Ramprashad (British Virgin Islands)

=== Ranking of second-placed teams ===
Pos	Grp	Team	Pld	W	D	L	GF	GA	GD	Pts	Qualification
1	B	Aruba (P)	4	3	0	1	8	5	+3	9	Promotion to League B, advance to play-in and semi-finals
2	C	U.S. Virgin Islands	4	3	0	1	8	8	0	9	
3	A	Turks and Caicos Islands	4	2	0	2	7	6	+1	6	

Source: CONCACAF
Rules for classification: Tiebreakers
(P) Promoted

== Finals ==
=== Bracket ===
Semi-finals
9 June 2027 – TBD
Montserrat
Aruba
9 June 2027 – TBD
Saint Martin
Antigua and Barbuda

Final
12 June 2027 – TBD
Winner SF1
Winner SF2
Third place play-off
12 June 2027 – TBD
Loser SF1
Loser SF2

== Goalscorers ==
There have been 69 goals scored in 18 matches, for an average of 3.83 goals per match (as of 6 October 2026). Players highlighted in bold are still active in the competition.

7 goals

- (Collectivity of Saint Martin) **Axel Raga**

5 goals

- (Collectivity of Saint Martin) **Pierre-Bertrand Arné**

4 goals

- (Montserrat) **Lyle Taylor**

3 goals

- (Antigua and Barbuda) **D'Andre Bishop**
- (Montserrat) **Ashley Boatswain**
- (Collectivity of Saint Martin) **Jordan Alexandre**
- (Turks and Caicos Islands) Billy Forbes

2 goals

- (Aruba) **Carlito Fermina**
- (Antigua and Barbuda) **Christopher Douglas**
- (Antigua and Barbuda) **Sean Tomlinson**
- (Montserrat) **Brandon Barzey**
- (United States Virgin Islands) Naqwan Henry
- (United States Virgin Islands) Jannick Liburd

1 goal

- (Anguilla) Antoine Fleming
- (Anguilla) Nathaniel Owen
- (Antigua and Barbuda) **TJ Bramble**
- (Antigua and Barbuda) **Kayonte George**
- (Antigua and Barbuda) **Dion Pereira**
- (Antigua and Barbuda) **Brandon Satchell**
- (Aruba) **Walter Bennett**
- (Aruba) **Justin Figaroa**
- (Aruba) **Alljereau Mercera**
- (Aruba) **Mishawn Molina**
- (Aruba) **Rovien Ostiana**
- (Aruba) **Justin Peterson**
- (The Bahamas) William Bayles
- (The Bahamas) Wood Julmis
- (The Bahamas) Christopher Rahming
- (Montserrat) **Tyrone Baker**
- (Collectivity of Saint Martin) **Rahim Denis**
- (Collectivity of Saint Martin) **Mattéo Makhabe**
- (Collectivity of Saint Martin) **Yanis Montantin**
- (Turks and Caicos Islands) Sean Clare
- (Turks and Caicos Islands) Dominic Hutchinson
- (Turks and Caicos Islands) Junior Paul
- (Turks and Caicos Islands) John Robertson
- (United States Virgin Islands) Noah Armour
- (United States Virgin Islands) Rakeem Joseph
- (United States Virgin Islands) Jimson St. Louis

1 own goal

- (The Bahamas) Michael Butler (against Saint Martin)
- (The Bahamas) Omar Chemaly (against U.S. Virgin Islands)
- (British Virgin Islands) Joel Mars (against Montserrat)
