= Jean-Louis Richards =

French professional football manager

Personal information
- Place of birth: France

Managerial career
- Years: Team
- 2010: Saint Martin

Jean-Louis Richards is a French professional football manager. In 2010, he coached the Saint Martin national football team together with David Baltase.
