= Justin Figaroa =

Aruban footballer (born 2004)

Personal information
- Date of birth: 22 March 2005 (age 21)
- Place of birth: Weert, Netherlands
- Height: 1.78 m (5 ft 10 in)
- Position: Midfielder

Team information
- Current team: Grand View Vikings
- Number: 9

Youth career
- 2011–2013: SV Laar
- 2013–2016: VVV
- 2016–2019: SV Laar
- 2019–2024: Eindhoven

College career
Years	Team	Apps	(Gls)
2024–2025	IU Indy Jaguars	10	(0)
2025–	Grand View Vikings	25	(13)

Senior career*
Years	Team	Apps	(Gls)
2026	Kalamazoo FC	12	(5)

International career^{‡}
2025–	Aruba	2	(1)
- * Club domestic league appearances and goals ‡ National team caps and goals as of 12:14, 30 September 2026 (UTC)

Justin Figaroa (born 22 March 2005) is an association footballer who plays for the Grand View Vikings. Born in the Netherlands, he represents the Aruba national team.

== Club career ==
At age six, Figaroa joined local club SV Laar. After a few seasons, he was scouted by VVV-Venlo and was asked to join the club. At age eleven, he returned to SV Laar. He was soon selected to the regional team of Zeeland, North Brabant, and Limburg by the KNVB. After playing against several professional clubs, including FC Eindhoven, he was invited to join the club at age fourteen. It was with Eindhoven that he changed his position to attacker after scoring four goals as a replacement to an injured teammate. He experience much success with Eindhoven, including a second-place league finish and promotion to the second division with the under-17 team. While with FC Eindhoven, he attended a presentation about playing college soccer in the United States. The opportunity to combine education and sports was very appealing to him and he decided to take the opportunity.

In June 2024, Figaroa was announced as a new recruit for the Jaguars of Indiana University Indianapolis in the NCAA Division I under Dutch head coach Sid van Druenen. That season, he made ten appearances for the team. Following the season, Figaroa transferred to Grand View University to play for the Grand View Vikings in the NAIA. That season, the team won its first-ever national championship, defeating the WVU Tech Golden Bears 2–1 in the final. Figaroa was then named to the All-Tournament Team. Figaroa was the team's top scorer that season with thirteen goals and seven assists in twenty-five matches.

In summer 2026, Figaroa joined Kalamazoo FC of the USL League Two for the 2026 season. His performances included a goal in a 2–0 victory over Oakland County FC which extended the team's winning streak and moved the team club closer to a play-off position.

== International career ==
Born in the Netherlands, Figaroa qualifies to represent Aruba through his paternal grandfather. He has many family members living on the island and visits every year. Because of his college performances, he was contacted by a scout from the Aruba Football Federation and asked to play for the national team. He made his international debut for the nation on 12 November 2025 in a 2025–26 CONCACAF Series match against Antigua and Barbuda.

=== International goals ===
Scores and results list Aruba's goal tally first.

No	Date	Venue	Opponent	Score	Result	Competition
1.	29 September 2026	Sir Vivian Richards Stadium, North Sound, Antigua and Barbuda	Anguilla	2–0	2–0	2026–27 CONCACAF Nations League C
Last updated 30 September 2026

=== International career statistics ===
As of match played 29 September 2026.

Aruba national team
2025	1	0
2026	1	1
Total	2	1
