= Saint Martin national football team =

Men's association football team

Saint Martin
- Association: Ligue de football de Saint-Martin (LFSM)
- Confederation: CONCACAF (North America)
- Sub-confederation: CFU (Caribbean)
- Head coach: Jean-Claude Darcheville
- Most caps: Yannick Bellechasse (30)
- Top scorer: Axel Raga (18)
- Home stadium: Stade Alberic Richards; Stade Thelbert Carti
- FIFA code: MAF; SMN
First colours	Second colours

FIFA ranking
- Current: NR (18 November 2026) –

First international
- Sint Maarten 1–3 Saint Martin (Philipsburg, Sint Marteen; 14 June 1988)

Biggest win
- Saint Martin 8–0 Anguilla (Basseterre, Saint Kitts and Nevis; 16 October 2023); Bahamas 0–8 Saint Martin (Upper Bethlehem, U.S. Virgin Islands; 23 September 2026)

Biggest defeat
- Jamaica 12–0 Saint Martin (Kingston, Jamaica; 24 November 2004)

The Saint Martin national football team (French: équipe de Saint-Martin de football) represents the Collectivity of Saint Martin, a French overseas collectivity in men's international football, and is governed by the Saint Martin Football League (French: Ligue de football de Saint-Martin), the governing body for football in Saint Martin founded in 1986. It has been a full member of CONCACAF since 2013, and is a member of CFU in the Caribbean Zone, however, it is not affiliated with FIFA.

Saint Martin has never qualified for the CONCACAF Gold Cup, but has participated four times in League C and once in League B of the CONCACAF Nations League.

Saint Martin's debut in international competitions was in the 1990 Caribbean Cup qualifying tournament. The team's first victory was in 1988 by defeating Sint Maarten 3–1, which was also its first match ever.

== History ==
Saint Martin played their first competitive match during the 1990 Caribbean Cup qualifiers against British Virgin Islands, winning 3–0. They beat Anguilla (4–0) and Cayman Islands (8–3 on aggregate) to advance to the final qualifying round where they failed to progress, losing 1–0 to Jamaica in the decisive group game.

Saint Martin would not enter the next nine Caribbean Cup tournaments, before returning in the 2001 qualification process, beating Anguilla and Montserrat before finishing six points behind Cuba in the final round of qualifying. In 2005 qualifying, Saint Martin failed to advance past the first qualifying round, losing heavily to Jamaica (12–0). From 2007 to 2012, Saint Martin were knocked out in the first round in every qualifying competition.

In August 2014, Saint Martin played a friendly against the British Virgin Islands, the territory's first match since 2012. At that time, SMFA president Fabrice Baly announced a 3-year project to fully return to Caribbean international football. He established long-term objectives of attracting the attention of international recruiters and qualifying for the 2017 CONCACAF Gold Cup. Saint Martin withdrew from 2017 Caribbean Cup qualification, ending the project that Baly had started.

In 2019, Saint Martin entered the qualification for the first CONCACAF Nations League, losing all four of their matches and finishing bottom of the standings, placing them into League C where they finished third, three points off from qualifying for League B.

== Results and fixtures ==
The following is a list of match results in the last 12 months, as well as any future matches that have been scheduled.

Win Draw Loss Fixture

=== 2025 ===
9 November Friendly	Saint Martin	1–2	Anguilla	Quartier-d'Orleans, Saint Martin
18:00		Report	Scipio; Deans	Stadium: Stade Thelbert Carti

12 November 2025-26 CONCACAF Series	Dominica	1–2	Saint Martin	Basseterre, Saint Kitts and Nevis
				Stadium: SKNFA Technical Center

15 November 2025-26 CONCACAF Series	Saint Martin	0–1	Belize	Basseterre, Saint Kitts and Nevis
				Stadium: SKNFA Technical Center

=== 2026 ===
26 March 2025–26 CONCACAF Series	Saint Martin	3–1	Barbados	Rincon, Bonaire
16:00 UTC−4	Léo 56', 57'; Williams 87' (o.g.)	Report	Oughterson 85'	Stadium: Stadion Antonio Trenidat; Referee: Shekiel Jokil (Suriname)

29 March 2025–26 CONCACAF Series	Bonaire	0–3	Saint Martin	Rincon, Bonaire
20:30 UTC−4	Oleana (red card) 87'	Report	Alexandre 39'; Léo 51'; Denis 68'	Stadium: Stadion Antonio Trenidat

23 September 2026 2026–27 CONCACAF Nations League C	Bahamas	0–8	Saint Martin	Upper Bethlehem, U.S. Virgin Islands
		Report	Raga 15', 52', 63' (pen.); Alexandre 20', 32'; Montantin 23'; Butler 41' (o.g.); Arné 80'	Stadium: Bethlehem Soccer Stadium; Referee: Vimarest Díaz (Dominican Republic)

September 26 2026–27 CONCACAF Nations League C	Saint Martin	0–2	U.S. Virgin Islands	Upper Bethlehem, U.S. Virgin Islands
16:00		Report	Liburd 18', 83'	Stadium: Bethlehem Soccer Stadium; Referee: Amaury Majors (Bermuda)

1 October 2026 2026–27 CONCACAF Nations League C	U.S. Virgin Islands	0–5	Saint Martin	Upper Bethlehem, U.S. Virgin Islands
		Report	Raga 44'; Denis 49'; Arné 83', 86', 89'	Stadium: Bethlehem Soccer Stadium; Attendance: 333; Referee: Jonathan Leitón (Costa Rica)

6 October 2026 2026–27 CONCACAF Nations League C	Saint Martin	6–0	Bahamas	Upper Bethlehem, U.S. Virgin Islands
	Raga 15', 77', 90+1'; Arné 24'; Makhabe 38'; Alexandre 50' (pen.)	Report		Stadium: Bethlehem Soccer Stadium; Referee: James Ramprashad (British Virgin Islands)

13 November 2026–27 Nations League A/C Play-In	Saint Martin	0-2	El Salvador	Basseterre, Saint Kitts and Nevis
19:00 UTC−4		Report		Stadium: SKNFA Technical Center

17 November 2026–27 Nations League A/C Play-In	El Salvador	v	Saint Martin	San Salvador, El Salvador
19:00 UTC−6		Report		Stadium: Estadio Jorge "El Mágico" González

== Coaching history ==
- (Sint Maarten) Owen Nickie (2004)
- (France) Gérard Andy (2006–2008)
- (France) Jean-Louis Richards & David Baltase (2010)
- (France) Dominique Rénia (2012)
- (France) David Baltase (2018)
- (Guadeloupe) Stéphane Auvray (2019–2024)
- (French Guiana) Jean-Claude Darcheville (2025–present)

== Players ==
=== Current squad ===
The following players were called up for two 2024–25 CONCACAF Nations League B against Saint Lucia on 11 and 14 October 2024.

Caps and goals as of 9 September 2024 after the game against Curaçao.

No.	Pos.	Player	Date of birth (age)	Caps	Goals	Club
	GK	Ulrich Luperon	11 December 2000 (age 25)	7	0	(Ligue guadeloupéenne de football) CS Moulien
	GK	Sébastien Raphose	29 June 1980 (age 46)	7	0	(French Football Federation) Entente SSG
	GK	Lenny Foy	29 December 1998 (age 27)	2	0	(Ligue guadeloupéenne de football) Red Star
	DF	Belony Dumas	18 July 1989 (age 37)	11	0	(French Football Federation) JAS Saint-Priest
	DF	Steven Laguerre	9 May 2001 (age 25)	10	0	(Ligue de football de Saint-Martin) Junior Stars
	DF	Stephan Varsovie	28 October 1990 (age 36)	9	0	(French Football Federation) AS Saint-Priest
	DF	David Chevalier	19 August 1995 (age 31)	5	0	(French Football Federation) FC Montceau
	DF	Donovan Fils-Aimé	31 October 2001 (age 25)	2	0	(French Football Federation) AS Saint-Germain-du-Puy
	DF	Fabien Fonrose	3 April 1998 (age 28)	0	0	(Luxembourg Football Federation) RFC Union Luxembourg
	DF	Jonas Smith	9 October 1999 (age 27)	0	0	(French Football Federation) AS Cannes
	MF	Noha Mauvais	21 July 2004 (age 22)	7	0	(Ligue de football de Saint-Martin) Junior Stars
	MF	Romuald Lacazette	3 January 1994 (age 32)	6	1	(German Football Association) Türkgücü München
	MF	Yoann Vardin	26 March 1998 (age 28)	5	0	(French Football Federation) Entente SSG
	MF	Rahim Denis	24 October 2001 (age 25)	2	0	(French Football Federation) Les Herbiers VF B
	MF	Yanis Montantin	2 August 1999 (age 27)	2	0	(Luxembourg Football Federation) FC Rodange 91
	MF	Sacha Barakat	19 October 2006 (age 20)	1	0	(French Football Federation) Tours U-19
	FW	Axel Raga	27 July 1997 (age 29)	6	8	(Ligue réunionnaise de football) Saint-Pierroise
	FW	Raheim Fleming	25 February 2003 (age 23)	4	0	(Ligue de football de Saint-Martin) AS Phoenicks
	FW	Keelan Lebon	4 July 1997 (age 29)	3	1	(Association of Football Federations of Azerbaijan) Neftçi PFK
	FW	Imri Chevalier	28 November 2006 (age 19)	2	0	(Ligue de football de Saint-Martin) Junior Stars
	FW	Jean-Baptiste Léo	3 May 1996 (age 30)	2	0	(Hellenic Football Federation) Apollon Kalamarias
	FW	Mickaël Marchal	29 June 1997 (age 29)	0	0	(French Football Federation) SU Dives-Cabourg

=== Recent call ups ===
Following players have been called up in previous 12 months.

Pos.	Player	Date of birth (age)	Caps	Goals	Club	Latest call-up
DF	Emmanuel Richardson	15 December 2001 (age 24)	16	2	(Netherlands) Elsweide	v. Curaçao; 9 September 2024
DF	Laurent Amiens	17 December 1993 (age 32)	7	0	(France) USM Saran	v. Curaçao; 9 September 2024
DF	Malcolm Babel	19 May 1993 (age 33)	3	0	(France) Pays du Valois	v. Curaçao; 9 September 2024
DF	Jalen Segor	19 May 1993 (age 33)	3	0	(Guadeloupe) La Gauloise de Basse-Terre	v. Curaçao; 9 September 2024
DF	Tyler Flanders	4 October 2007 (age 19)	2	0	(Collectivity of Saint Martin) ASC St. Louis Stars	v. Curaçao; 9 September 2024
MF	Kearney Chance	18 May 2001 (age 25)	6	0	(Collectivity of Saint Martin) Phoenicks	v. Anguilla; 16 October 2023
FW	Yannick Bellechasse	26 October 1992 (age 34)	28	5	(Collectivity of Saint Martin) Junior Stars	v. Curaçao; 9 September 2024
FW	Randy Gentes	27 May 2000 (age 26)	9	2	(France) ES Nanterre	v. Curaçao; 9 September 2024

== Records ==
As of 25 May 2025
Players in bold are still active with Saint Martin.

=== Most appearances ===
Rank	Player	Caps	Goals	Career
1	**Yannick Bellechasse**	30	5	2012–present
2	**Emmanuel Richardson**	16	2	2018–present
2	**Belony Dumas**	16	0	2019–present
4	Henri Emile	14	0	2002–2012
4	Jason Maccow	14	0	2018–2022
4	**Stephan Varsovie**	14	1	2022–present
7	Wilfried Dalmat	12	1	2019–2023
7	Elvis Fléming	12	0	2006–2018
7	**Randy Gentes**	12	3	2022–present
7	**Steven Laguerre**	12	0	2019–present
7	**Axel Raga**	12	11	2023–present

=== Top goalscorers ===
Rank	Name	Goals	Caps	Ratio	Career
1	**Axel Raga**	11	12	0.92	2023–present
2	**Stanley Segarel**	5	3	1.67	2023–present
2	**Danilo Cocks**	5	11	0.45	2014–present
2	**Yannick Bellechasse**	5	30	0.17	2012–present
5	Romuald Benjamin	4	5	0.8	2001–2004
6	Akim Arrondell	3	6	0.5	2018–2019
6	**Pierre-Bertrand Arné**	3	8	0.38	2022–present
6	**Randy Gentes**	3	12	0.25	2022–present

== Competitive record ==
=== CONCACAF Gold Cup ===
CONCACAF Gold Cup record
Year	Round	Pld	W	D	L	GF	GA
1991 to 2000	Not a CONCACAF member						
2002 to 2025	Did not qualify						
Total	0/13						

=== CONCACAF Nations League ===
CONCACAF Nations League record
League										Finals								
Season	Division	Group	Pld	W	D	L	GF	GA	P/R	Finals	Result	Pld	W	D	L	GF	GA	Squad
2019–20	C	A	6	3	0	3	7	8	Same position	(United States) 2021	Ineligible							
2022–23	C	B	4	0	2	2	2	7	Same position	(United States) 2023	Ineligible							
2023–24	C	A	4	4	0	0	20	1	▲	(United States) 2024	Ineligible							
2024–25	B	B	6	2	0	4	8	13	▼	(United States) 2025	Ineligible							
Total	—	—	20	9	2	9	37	29	—	Total	0 Titles	—	—	—	—	—	—	—

=== Caribbean Cup ===
Caribbean Cup record									Qualification record					
Year	Round	Position	Pld	W	D*	L	GF	GA	Pld	W	D*	L	GF	GA
(Barbados) 1989	Did not enter								Did not enter					
(Trinidad and Tobago) 1990	Did not qualify								7	5	0	2	17	6
1991 to 1999	Did not enter								Did not enter					
(Trinidad and Tobago) 2001	Did not qualify								5	3	0	2	9	7
(Barbados) 2005	Did not qualify								3	0	1	2	0	14
(Trinidad and Tobago) 2007	Did not qualify								3	0	1	2	0	2
(Jamaica) 2008	Did not qualify								3	0	0	3	2	13
(Martinique) 2010	Did not qualify								3	0	1	2	2	5
(Antigua and Barbuda) 2012	Did not qualify								3	0	0	3	0	24
(Jamaica) 2014	Did not enter								Did not enter					
(Martinique) 2017	Withdrew								Withdrew					
Total		0/19							27	8	3	16	30	71

== Record by opponent ==
Updated on 1 October 2026 after match against U.S. Virgin Islands

Positive Record Neutral Record Negative Record

Opponent	P	W	D	L	GF	GA	GD
Anguilla	9	7	1	1	27	8	+19
Antigua and Barbuda	2	0	0	2	3	5	–2
Aruba	2	0	1	1	0	3	–3
Bahamas	3	3	0	0	18	0	+18
Barbados	3	2	0	1	5	7	–2
Belize	1	0	0	1	0	1	–1
Bermuda	2	0	0	2	1	9	–8
Bonaire	3	3	0	0	9	1	+8
British Virgin Islands	1	0	0	1	0	1	–1
Cayman Islands	2	0	1	1	2	4	–2
Cuba	1	0	0	1	0	1	–1
Curaçao	2	0	0	2	0	9	–9
Dominica	3	2	1	0	5	3	+2
Grenada	4	1	0	3	7	17	–10
Guadeloupe	1	0	0	1	0	1	–1
Guyana	1	0	0	1	0	2	–2
Haiti	1	0	0	1	0	2	–2
Jamaica	2	0	0	2	0	13	–13
Martinique	1	0	0	1	0	1	–1
Montserrat	1	1	0	0	3	1	+2
Puerto Rico	2	0	0	2	0	11	–11
Saint Barthélemy	1	1	0	0	3	0	+3
Saint Kitts and Nevis	7	1	1	5	9	18	–9
Saint Lucia	2	1	0	1	5	2	+3
Sint Eustatius	1	0	1	0	3	3	0
Sint Maarten	2	1	0	1	6	5	+1
Tortola	1	1	0	0	1	0	+1
Trinidad and Tobago	1	0	0	1	0	2	–2
U.S. Virgin Islands	6	2	1	3	9	7	+2
Total	67	25	7	35	108	137	–29

== Historical kits ==
2008 Home	2010 Home	2017 Home	2017 Away	2019 Home	2019 Away	2022 Home	2022 Away
