= Joshua Zimmerman (footballer) =

Curaçao footballer (born 1986)

Personal information
- Full name: Joshua Anthony Zimmerman
- Date of birth: 23 May 2001 (age 25)
- Place of birth: Almere, Netherlands
- Height: 1.78 m (5 ft 10 in)
- Positions: Winger; forward

Team information
- Current team: FK Voždovac (on loan from Livingston)
- Number: 29

Youth career
- –2011: Forza Almere
- 2011–2018: Almere City Youth
- 2018–2019: Almere City U19
- 2019–2022: Almere City U21

Senior career*
Years	Team	Apps	(Gls)
2021–2022	Almere City	7	(0)
2022–2023	OH Leuven U23	31	(15)
2023–2026	TOP Oss	78	(7)
2026–	Livingston	7	(0)
2026–	→ FK Voždovac (loan)	0	(0)

International career^{‡}
2022–	Curaçao	13	(1)
- * Club domestic league appearances and goals as of 20 May 2026 ‡ National team caps and goals as of 10 September 2025

Joshua Anthony Zimmerman (born 23 May 2001) is a professional footballer who plays as a forward for FK Voždovac, on loan from Scottish Championship club Livingston. Born in the Netherlands, he represents the Curaçao national team.

== Career ==
On 26 December 2025, Scottish Premiership club Livingston announced the signing of Zimmerman on a three-and-a-half year deal for an undisclosed fee, officially joining on 1 January 2026.

Zimmerman signed for Serbian side FK Voždovac on loan in September 2026.

== International career ==
Zimmerman made his debut for the Curaçao national team in a CONCACAF Nations League match against Canada on 10 June 2022 as he came on for Rangelo Janga with about 20 minutes to play.

== Career statistics ==
=== International ===
As of match played 24 June 2025

Appearances and goals by national team and year
National team	Year	Apps	Goals
Curaçao
Curaçao	2022	1	0
Curaçao	2023	4	0
Curaçao	2024	4	1
Curaçao	2025	3	0
Total		12	1

Scores and results list Curaçao's goal tally first score column indicates score after each Zimmerman goal.

List of international goals scored by Joshua Zimmerman
No.	Date	Venue	Opponent	Score	Result	Competition	Ref.
1	9 September 2024	Kirani James Athletic Stadium, St. George's, Grenada	Saint Martin	4–0	4–0	2024–25 CONCACAF Nations League B	
