= Tyron Perret Gentil =

Aruban footballer

Personal information
- Full name: Tyron Corson Jozua Perret Gentil
- Date of birth: 10 April 2004 (age 22)
- Place of birth: Haarlem, Netherlands
- Position: Midfielder

Team information
- Current team: Jong Almere City
- Number: 48

Youth career
- 2014–2017: Amsterdam
- 2017–2019: Vitesse
- 2019–2022: PSV
- 2022–2023: Vitesse

Senior career*
Years	Team	Apps	(Gls)
2023–2024	Vitesse	0	(0)
2024–	Jong Almere City	2	(0)

International career^{‡}
2019	Netherlands U15	5	(2)
2024–	Aruba	4	(1)
- * Club domestic league appearances and goals ‡ National team caps and goals as of 14:04, 28 October 2024 (UTC)

Tyron Perret Gentil (born 10 April 2004) is an Aruban footballer who currently plays for Almere City and the Aruba national team.

== Club career ==
Perret Gentil began his career with Amsterdam FC where he remained from 2014 to 2017. In 2017, he moved to the under-14 team of SBV Vitesse. From 2019 to 2022, he was a member of the PSV Eindhoven academy. Perret Gentil returned to Vitesse in 2022 and made his unofficial senior debut for the club on 6 September 2023 in a practice match against Almere City, coming on as a second-half substitute. In June 2024, he joined Almere City and began playing with the club's reserve team in the Tweede Divisie.

== International career ==
As a youth, Perret Gentil represented the Netherlands, his country of birth, at the under-15 level. In February 2019, he scored on his debut for the side in a match against Ireland. The following May, he scored the Netherlands' first goal in a 2–1 victory over Germany. In total, he scored two goals in five appearances for the team.

Perret Gentil made his senior international debut for Aruba on 11 June 2024 in a 2026 FIFA World Cup qualification match against Saint Lucia. He scored his first goal for Aruba in a 2024–25 CONCACAF Nations League B match against Haiti on 11 October 2024, opening the scoring in the sixth minute of the eventual 1–3 defeat.

=== International goals ===
Scores and results list Aruba's goal tally first.

No	Date	Venue	Opponent	Score	Result	Competition
1.	11 October 2024	Guillermo Prospero Trinidad Stadium, Oranjestad, Aruba	Haiti	1–3	1–3	2024–25 CONCACAF Nations League B
Last updated 14 October 2024

=== International career statistics ===
As of match played 11 October 2024.

Aruba national team
2024	4	1
Total	4	1
