= 2024–25 CONCACAF Nations League B =

Tournament details
- Dates: 5 September – 19 November 2024
- Teams: 16
- Promoted: Curaçao; Dominican Republic; El Salvador; Haiti
- Relegated: Antigua and Barbuda; Aruba; Montserrat; Saint Martin

Tournament statistics
- Matches played: 48
- Goals scored: 170 (3.54 per match)
- Top scorer: (Dominican Republic) Dorny Romero (10 goals)

The 2024–25 CONCACAF Nations League B was the second division of the 2024–25 edition of the CONCACAF Nations League, the fourth season of the international football competition involving the men's national teams of the 41 member associations of CONCACAF. It was held from 5 September to 19 November 2024.

This edition of the CONCACAF Nations League B served to determine four teams that would qualify directly for the 2025 CONCACAF Gold Cup in the United States and two teams that would qualify for the 2025 CONCACAF Gold Cup qualification tournament.

== Format ==
League B maintained the same format introduced since the inaugural edition, except that matches were played at a centralized venues instead of the previous home-and-away format.

The sixteen participating teams were split into four groups of four teams and each group was played on a double round-robin basis, with matches being held in the official FIFA match windows in September, October and November 2024. The first-placed team of each group was promoted to the 2026–27 CONCACAF Nations League A, and the fourth-placed team of each group was relegated to the 2026–27 CONCACAF Nations League C.

=== 2025 CONCACAF Gold Cup qualification ===
As announced by CONCACAF in February 2023, the 2024–25 CONCACAF Nations League served as a qualifier for the 2025 CONCACAF Gold Cup. League B teams could qualify for the 2025 CONCACAF Gold Cup final tournament or the Gold Cup qualification tournament (also called CONCACAF Gold Cup prelims), as follows:

- The four group winners (i.e., the four teams that were promoted to League A) qualified directly for the 2025 CONCACAF Gold Cup.
- The best two second-placed teams qualified for the 2025 CONCACAF Gold Cup qualification tournament.

== Teams ==
A total of sixteen national teams contested League B, including eight sides from the 2023–24 season, four relegated teams from the 2023–24 League A, and four promoted teams from the 2023–24 League C.

=== Team changes ===
The following were the team changes in League B regarding the 2023–24 season:

Incoming
Relegated from Nations League A	Promoted from Nations League C
Curaçao; El Salvador; Grenada; Haiti	Aruba; Bonaire; Dominica; Saint Martin

Outgoing
Promoted to Nations League A	Relegated to Nations League C
French Guiana; Guadeloupe; Guyana; Nicaragua	Bahamas; Barbados; Belize; Saint Kitts and Nevis

=== Seeding ===
The pots were confirmed on 19 April 2024, with the sixteen League B teams being split into three pots of three teams, based on the CONCACAF Rankings as of 31 March 2024.

Pot 1
Team	Rank	Pts
Haiti	8	1,409
El Salvador	12	1,230
Curaçao	14	1,134
Dominican Republic	20	933

Pot 2
Team	Rank	Pts
Bermuda	21	854
Puerto Rico	22	849
Montserrat	23	815
Saint Lucia	24	798

Pot 3
Team	Rank	Pts
Grenada	26	774
Saint Vincent and the Grenadines	27	769
Antigua and Barbuda	28	768
Aruba	30	641

Pot 4
Team	Rank	Pts
Dominica	31	638
Bonaire	32	590
Saint Martin	34	522
Sint Maarten	35	487

=== Draw ===
The draw for the groups composition was held on 6 May 2024, 19:00 EDT (UTC−4), in Miami, Florida, United States, where the nine sixteen involved teams were drawn into four groups of four. The draw began by randomly selecting a team from Pot 1 and placing them in Group A and then selecting the remaining teams from Pot 1 and placing them into groups B, C and D in sequential order. The draw continued with the same procedure done for the remaining pots.

The draw resulted in the following groups:

Group A
Pos	Team
A1	El Salvador
A2	Montserrat
A3	Saint Vincent and the Grenadines
A4	Bonaire

Group B
Pos	Team
B1	Curaçao
B2	Saint Lucia
B3	Grenada
B4	Saint Martin

Group C
Pos	Team
C1	Haiti
C2	Puerto Rico
C3	Aruba
C4	Sint Maarten

Group D
Pos	Team
D1	Dominican Republic
D2	Bermuda
D3	Antigua and Barbuda
D4	Dominica

== Groups ==
In an effort to reduce the travel disruptions faced by teams in previous editions, CONCACAF decided that the League B matches scheduled in each FIFA match window would be held at a centralized venue.

In this way, the national association of the third-highest ranked team in each group, once the draw was made, was responsible for hosting all matches in its group scheduled for the September FIFA match window. The second-highest ranked team in each group, once the draw was made, was responsible for hosting all matches in its group scheduled for the October FIFA match window. Likewise, the top-ranked team in each group, once the draw was made, was responsible for hosting all matches in its group scheduled in the November FIFA match window. If a national association was unable to host matches, CONCACAF reserved the right to select another venue.

The fixture list was confirmed by CONCACAF on 23 May 2024. All match times are in EDT (UTC−4) for September and October dates and EST (UTC−5) for November dates, as listed by CONCACAF (local times, if different, are in parentheses).

=== Group A ===
By regulation, the September matches were to be held in Saint Vincent and the Grenadines (A3 team after the draw) and the November matches were to be held in Montserrat (A2 team after the draw). However, Saint Vincent and the Grenadines went on to host the November matches, while Bonaire was designated by CONCACAF to host the September matches. Montserrat declined to host any match windows.

Pos	Team	Pld	W	D	L	GF	GA	GD	Pts	Promotion, qualification or relegation	(El Salvador)	(Saint Vincent and the Grenadines)	(Bonaire)	(Montserrat)
1	El Salvador (H, P)	6	5	0	1	12	6	+6	15	Promotion to League A and qualification for Gold Cup	—	1–2	2–1	1–0
2	Saint Vincent and the Grenadines (H)	6	4	1	1	12	7	+5	13	Qualification for Gold Cup prelims	2–3	—	3–1	2–0
3	Bonaire (H)	6	1	1	4	4	8	−4	4		0–1	1–1	—	0–1
4	Montserrat (R)	6	1	0	5	3	10	−7	3	Relegation to League C	1–4	1–2	0–1	—

Source: CONCACAF
Rules for classification: Tiebreakers
(H) Hosts; (P) Promoted; (R) Relegated
5 September 2024
16:00

Montserrat	1–4	El Salvador
Barzey 28'	Report	Landaverde 9'; Mauricio 63'; Benitez 68'; Santamaría 84' (pen.)

Stadion Antonio Trenidat, Rincon (Bonaire)
Referee: Benjamín Pineda (Costa Rica)
5 September 2024
21:00

Bonaire	1–1	Saint Vincent and the Grenadines
Hoeve 36'	Report	Pierre 39'

Stadion Antonio Trenidat, Rincon
Referee: Jon Freemon (United States)

8 September 2024
16:00

Saint Vincent and the Grenadines	2–0	Montserrat
Stewart 15'; Spring 88'	Report

Stadion Antonio Trenidat, Rincon (Bonaire)
Referee: Rubiel Vazquez (United States)
8 September 2024
21:00

El Salvador	2–1	Bonaire
Hoeve 45+3' (o.g.); Mauricio 60'	Report	Van der Sande 90+1'

Stadion Antonio Trenidat, Rincon (Bonaire)
Referee: Steven Madrigal (Costa Rica)

10 October 2024
16:00

Bonaire	0–1	Montserrat
	Report	Taylor 49' (pen.)

Arnos Vale Stadium, Kingstown (Saint Vincent and the Grenadines)
Referee: Hakeem Harvey (Saint Kitts and Nevis)
10 October 2024
21:00

Saint Vincent and the Grenadines	2–3	El Salvador
John 43'; Adams 63'	Report	Vásquez 20'; Ortíz 70'; Castillo 87'

Arnos Vale Stadium, Kingstown
Attendance: 3,500
Referee: Oshane Nation (Jamaica)

13 October 2024
15:00

Montserrat	0–1	Bonaire
	Report	Cicilia 29'

Arnos Vale Stadium, Kingstown (Saint Vincent and the Grenadines)
Attendance: 213
Referee: Khamal Harding-Hodge (Anguilla)
13 October 2024
20:00

El Salvador	1–2	Saint Vincent and the Grenadines
Clavel 71'	Report	Adams 39'; Spring 88'

Arnos Vale Stadium, Kingstown (Saint Vincent and the Grenadines)
Referee: Tristley Bassue (Saint Kitts and Nevis)

14 November 2024
15:00 (14:00 UTC−6)

Montserrat	1–2	Saint Vincent and the Grenadines
Daniels 88'	Report	Pierre 42'; Stewart 86' (pen.)

Estadio Cuscatlán, San Salvador (El Salvador)
Referee: Jorge Leira (Panama)
14 November 2024
20:00 (19:00 UTC−6)

Bonaire	0–1	El Salvador
	Report	Vásquez 83'

Estadio Cuscatlán, San Salvador (El Salvador)
Attendance: 5,732
Referee: Steven Madrigal (Costa Rica)

17 November 2024
15:00 (14:00 UTC−6)

Saint Vincent and the Grenadines	3–1	Bonaire
Spring 19', 82'; Edwards 67'	Report	Yorke 75' (o.g.)

Estadio Cuscatlán, San Salvador (El Salvador)
Referee: José Torres (Puerto Rico)
17 November 2024
20:00 (19:00 UTC−6)

El Salvador	1–0	Montserrat
Tejada 9'	Report

Estadio Cuscatlán, San Salvador
Referee: Sergio Reyna (Guatemala)

=== Group B ===
Pos	Team	Pld	W	D	L	GF	GA	GD	Pts	Promotion, qualification or relegation	(Curaçao)	(Saint Lucia)	(Grenada)	(Collectivity of Saint Martin)
1	Curaçao (H, P)	6	4	1	1	15	3	+12	13	Promotion to League A and qualification for Gold Cup	—	4–1	1–0	4–0
2	Saint Lucia (H)	6	3	0	3	7	15	−8	9		2–1	—	0–4	0–4
3	Grenada (H)	6	2	1	3	7	6	+1	7		0–0	1–2	—	0–3
4	Saint Martin (R)	6	2	0	4	8	13	−5	6	Relegation to League C	0–5	1–2	0–2	—

Source: CONCACAF
Rules for classification: Tiebreakers
(H) Hosts; (P) Promoted; (R) Relegated
6 September 2024
17:00

Saint Lucia	2–1	Curaçao
Jude-Boyd 24'; Elva 55'	Report	Brenet 63'

Kirani James Athletic Stadium, St. George's (Grenada)
Referee: Ken Pennyfeather (Antigua and Barbuda)
6 September 2024
20:00

Saint Martin	0–2	Grenada
	Report	Akins 5'; Reg. Charles-Cook 38'

Kirani James Athletic Stadium, St. George's (Grenada)
Referee: David Gómez (Costa Rica)

9 September 2024
17:00

Curaçao	4–0	Saint Martin
J. Bacuna 10'; Kastaneer 13'; L. Bacuna 48'; Zimmerman 65'	Report

Kirani James Athletic Stadium, St. George's (Grenada)
Referee: José Corporán (Dominican Republic)
9 September 2024
20:00

Grenada	1–2	Saint Lucia
Akins 51'	Report	Forino-Joseph 13'; Baptiste 21'

Kirani James Athletic Stadium, St. George's
Referee: Josué Ugalde (Costa Rica)

11 October 2024
17:00

Grenada	0–0	Curaçao
	Report

Daren Sammy Cricket Ground, Gros Islet (Saint Lucia)
Referee: Jon Freemon (United States)
11 October 2024
20:00

Saint Martin	1–2	Saint Lucia
Raga 30'	Report	Elva 76', 90'

Daren Sammy Cricket Ground, Gros Islet (Saint Lucia)
Referee: Odette Hamilton (Jamaica)

14 October 2024
16:00

Curaçao	1–0	Grenada
J. Bacuna 30'	Report

Daren Sammy Cricket Ground, Gros Islet (Saint Lucia)
Referee: Christopher Mason (Jamaica)
14 October 2024
19:00

Saint Lucia	0–4	Saint Martin
	Report	Lebon 8' (pen.), 45+2'; Barakat 26'; Arne 62'

Daren Sammy Cricket Ground, Gros Islet
Attendance: 1,121
Referee: Michael Venne (Canada)

15 November 2024
15:00 (16:00 UTC−4)

Saint Lucia	0–4	Grenada
	Report	Francis 50'; Reg. Charles-Cook 56'; Williams 74'; Hippolyte 86'

Ergilio Hato Stadium, Willemstad (Curaçao)
Referee: Shavin Greene (Guyana)
15 November 2024
18:00 (19:00 UTC−4)

Saint Martin	0–5	Curaçao
	Report	Margaritha 24', 34', 54', 80'; J. Bacuna 78' (pen.)

Ergilio Hato Stadium, Willemstad (Curaçao)
Referee: Félix Mojica (Nicaragua)

18 November 2024
15:00 (16:00 UTC−4)

Grenada	0–3	Saint Martin
	Report	Denis 39'; Lebon 87', 90+3'

Ergilio Hato Stadium, Willemstad (Curaçao)
Referee: José Corporán (Dominican Republic)
18 November 2024
18:00 (19:00 UTC−4)

Curaçao	4–1	Saint Lucia
Kastaneer 27', 30'; J. Bacuna 73', 79'	Report	Charles 29'

Ergilio Hato Stadium, Willemstad
Referee: Fernando Hernández (Mexico)

=== Group C ===
Aruba and Puerto Rico swapped the months in which they were originally scheduled to host the matches, with Puerto Rico eventually hosting the September matches and Aruba the October matches. The November matches, which by regulation were to be held in Haiti, were initially planned to be held in Martinique, at the proposal of the Haitian Football Federation, due to the impossibility of organizing them on home soil due to the ongoing Haitian crisis. However, CONCACAF decided to move the matches to Puerto Rico for security reasons related to the 2024 social unrest in Martinique, which also made it impossible to play the matches in that territory.

Pos	Team	Pld	W	D	L	GF	GA	GD	Pts	Promotion, qualification or relegation	(Haiti)	(Puerto Rico)	(Sint Maarten)	(Aruba)
1	Haiti (H, P)	6	6	0	0	29	5	+24	18	Promotion to League A and qualification for Gold Cup	—	3–0	6–0	5–3
2	Puerto Rico (H)	6	3	0	3	11	12	−1	9		1–4	—	2–1	5–1
3	Sint Maarten	6	3	0	3	7	18	−11	9		0–8	3–2	—	2–0
4	Aruba (H, R)	6	0	0	6	5	17	−12	0	Relegation to League C	1–3	0–1	0–1	—

Source: CONCACAF
Rules for classification: Tiebreakers
(H) Hosts; (P) Promoted; (R) Relegated
6 September 2024
17:00

Sint Maarten	2–0	Aruba
Lake 81'; Olivacce 90+3'	Report

Mayagüez Athletics Stadium, Mayagüez (Puerto Rico)
Referee: Hakeem Harvey (Saint Kitts and Nevis)
6 September 2024
20:00

Puerto Rico	1–4	Haiti
G. Díaz 29'	Report	Jean Jacques 51'; Pierrot 60'; Deedson 76'; Nazon 83'

Mayagüez Athletics Stadium, Mayagüez
Referee: Filip Dujic (Canada)

9 September 2024
17:00

Haiti	6–0	Sint Maarten
Attys 41'; Nazon 59', 75', 82'; Cantave 76', 84'	Report

Mayagüez Athletics Stadium, Mayagüez (Puerto Rico)
Referee: Carly Shaw-MacLaren (Canada)
9 September 2024
20:00

Aruba	0–1	Puerto Rico
	Report	Antonetti 73'

Mayagüez Athletics Stadium, Mayagüez (Puerto Rico)
Referee: Kimbell Ward (Saint Kitts and Nevis)

11 October 2024
16:00

Sint Maarten	3–2	Puerto Rico
Amatkarijo 44', 85' (pen.); Kort 49'	Report	Sulia 2'; A. Díaz 90+5'

Trinidad Stadium, Oranjestad (Aruba)
Attendance: 19
Referee: Benjamín Pineda (Costa Rica)
11 October 2024
20:00 (Note: The Aruba v Haiti match, originally scheduled at 19:00 EDT (UTC−4), was re-scheduled to 20:00 EDT.)

Aruba	1–3	Haiti
Perret Gentil 6'	Report	Pierrot 30'; Nazon 38' (pen.), 61'

Trinidad Stadium, Oranjestad
Attendance: 1,011
Referee: Kwinsi Williams (Trinidad and Tobago)

14 October 2024
16:00

Puerto Rico	2–1	Sint Maarten
G. Díaz 45'; R. Rivera 83' (pen.)	Report	Christina 54'

Trinidad Stadium, Oranjestad (Aruba)
Attendance: 34
Referee: Moeth Gaymes (Saint Vincent and the Grenadines)
14 October 2024
20:00 (Note: The Haiti v Aruba match, originally scheduled at 19:00 EDT (UTC−4), was re-scheduled to 20:00 EDT.)

Haiti	5–3	Aruba
Jean Jacques 16'; Deedson 42'; Nazon 66' (pen.); Picault 76'; Pierrot 89' (pen.)	Report	Ostiana 14' (pen.), 20'; Kruydenhof 78'

Trinidad Stadium, Oranjestad (Aruba)
Attendance: 837
Referee: David Gómez (Costa Rica)

15 November 2024
17:00 (18:00 UTC−4)

Puerto Rico	5–1	Aruba
Rivera 8'; Hernandez 23'; Ríos 55'; Servania 62'; A. Díaz 81'	Report	Jiménez 22'

Mayagüez Athletics Stadium, Mayagüez
Referee: Nicolas Wassouf (Martinique)
15 November 2024
20:00 (21:00 UTC−4)

Sint Maarten	0–8	Haiti
	Report	Attys 2'; Pierrot 14', 25', 52'; Lacroix 19'; Nazon 49', 58' (pen.); Prunier 67'

Mayagüez Athletics Stadium, Mayagüez (Puerto Rico)
Referee: Norberto da Silva (Curaçao)

18 November 2024
17:00 (18:00 UTC−4)

Aruba	0–1	Sint Maarten
	Report	Illidge 90'

Mayagüez Athletics Stadium, Mayagüez (Puerto Rico)
Referee: Fernando Morón (Panama)
18 November 2024
20:00 (21:00 UTC−4)

Haiti	3–0	Puerto Rico
Attys 29'; Deedson 53'; Pierrot 70'	Report

Mayagüez Athletics Stadium, Mayagüez (Puerto Rico)
Referee: Rubiel Vazquez (United States)

=== Group D ===
Pos	Team	Pld	W	D	L	GF	GA	GD	Pts	Promotion, qualification or relegation	(Dominican Republic)	(Bermuda)	(Dominica)	(Antigua and Barbuda)
1	Dominican Republic (H, P)	6	6	0	0	27	4	+23	18	Promotion to League A and qualification for Gold Cup	—	6–1	2–0	5–0
2	Bermuda (H)	6	4	0	2	15	13	+2	12	Qualification for Gold Cup prelims	2–3	—	3–2	2–1
3	Dominica	6	1	1	4	6	18	−12	4		1–6	1–6	—	2–1
4	Antigua and Barbuda (H, R)	6	0	1	5	2	15	−13	1	Relegation to League C	0–5	0–1	0–0	—

Source: CONCACAF
Rules for classification: Tiebreakers
(H) Hosts; (P) Promoted; (R) Relegated
7 September 2024
11:00

Bermuda	2–3	Dominican Republic
Crichlow 17'; Lambe 51'	Report	Romero 35'; Mörschel 62'; Vásquez 84'

ABFA Technical Center, Piggotts (Antigua and Barbuda)
Referee: Sanchez Bass (Saint Kitts and Nevis)
7 September 2024
16:00

Dominica	2–1	Antigua and Barbuda
Bertrand 46'; Joseph 57'	Report	Stevens 53'

ABFA Technical Center, Piggotts (Antigua and Barbuda)
Referee: Odette Hamilton (Jamaica)

10 September 2024
11:00

Dominican Republic	2–0	Dominica
Vásquez 11'; Romero 25'	Report

ABFA Technical Center, Piggotts (Antigua and Barbuda)
Referee: Okeito Nicholson (Jamaica)
10 September 2024
16:00

Antigua and Barbuda	0–1	Bermuda
	Report	Crichlow 56'

ABFA Technical Center, Piggotts
Referee: Tristley Bassue (Saint Kitts and Nevis)

12 October 2024
13:30 (14:30 UTC−3)

Antigua and Barbuda	0–5	Dominican Republic
	Report	García 11'; Romero 13'; Vásquez 39'; Firpo 88', 90+2' (pen.)

Bermuda National Stadium, Devonshire Parish (Bermuda)
Attendance: 58
Referee: Steven Madrigal (Costa Rica)
12 October 2024
18:30 (19:30 UTC−3)

Dominica	1–6	Bermuda
Joseph 61'	Report	Wells 9', 18', 26' (pen.); Lewis 49'; Scott 85'; Bean 90'

Bermuda National Stadium, Devonshire Parish (Bermuda)
Referee: Fernando Morón (Panama)

15 October 2024
13:30 (14:30 UTC−3)

Dominican Republic	5–0	Antigua and Barbuda
De Lucas 14'; Mörschel 35'; Romero 45+1' (pen.); Firpo 52'; García 75'	Report

Bermuda National Stadium, Devonshire Parish (Bermuda)
Referee: Cristopher Corado (Guatemala)
15 October 2024
18:30 (19:30 UTC−3)

Bermuda	3–2	Dominica
Bredas 37' (o.g.); Hall 45'; Bean 67'	Report	Jules 50'; Laville 59' (pen.)

Bermuda National Stadium, Devonshire Parish
Referee: Josué Ugalde (Costa Rica)

16 November 2024
16:00 (17:00 UTC−4)

Bermuda	2–1	Antigua and Barbuda
Crichlow 8'; Lambe 48'	Report	Massicot 69'

Estadio Cibao FC, Santiago de los Caballeros (Dominican Republic)
Referee: Timothy Derry (Trinidad and Tobago)
16 November 2024
19:00 (20:00 UTC−4)

Dominica	1–6	Dominican Republic
Joseph 30'	Report	Romero 13', 65'; Mörschel 37', 49'; Mata 68'; Paniagua 90+5' (pen.)

Estadio Cibao FC, Santiago de los Caballeros (Dominican Republic)
Referee: Nelson Salgado (Honduras)

19 November 2024
16:00 (17:00 UTC−4)

Antigua and Barbuda	0–0	Dominica
	Report

Estadio Cibao FC, Santiago de los Caballeros (Dominican Republic)
Referee: Timothy Derry (Trinidad and Tobago)
19 November 2024
19:00 (20:00 UTC−4)

Dominican Republic	6–1	Bermuda
Romero 33', 69', 90', 90+4'; J. López 75'; Mörschel 87'	Report	Parfitt 45+2'

Estadio Cibao FC, Santiago de los Caballeros
Referee: José García Meléndez (El Salvador)

=== Ranking of second-placed teams ===
Pos	Grp	Team	Pld	W	D	L	GF	GA	GD	Pts	Qualification
1	A	Saint Vincent and the Grenadines	6	4	1	1	12	7	+5	13	Qualification for Gold Cup prelims
2	D	Bermuda	6	4	0	2	15	13	+2	12	Qualification for Gold Cup prelims
3	C	Puerto Rico	6	3	0	3	11	12	−1	9	
4	B	Saint Lucia	6	3	0	3	7	15	−8	9	

Source: CONCACAF
Rules for classification: Tiebreakers

== Goalscorers ==
There were 170 goals scored in 48 matches, for an average of 3.54 goals per match.

10 goals

- (Dominican Republic) Dorny Romero

9 goals

- (Haiti) Duckens Nazon

7 goals

- (Haiti) Frantzdy Pierrot

5 goals

- (Curaçao) Juninho Bacuna
- (Dominican Republic) Heinz Mörschel

4 goals

- (Curaçao) Jearl Margaritha
- (Collectivity of Saint Martin) Keelan Lebon
- (Saint Vincent and the Grenadines) Diel Spring

3 goals

- (Bermuda) Nahki Wells
- (Bermuda) Kane Crichlow
- (Curaçao) Gervane Kastaneer
- (Dominica) Travist Joseph
- (Dominican Republic) Junior Firpo
- (Dominican Republic) Ronaldo Vásquez
- (Haiti) Christopher Attys
- (Haiti) Louicius Deedson
- (Saint Lucia) Caniggia Elva

2 goals

- (Aruba) Rovien Ostiana
- (Bermuda) Jai Bean
- (Bermuda) Reggie Lambe
- (Dominican Republic) César García
- (El Salvador) Emerson Mauricio
- (El Salvador) Styven Vásquez
- (Grenada) Lucas Akins
- (Grenada) Regan Charles-Cook
- (Haiti) Mikaël Cantave
- (Haiti) Danley Jean Jacques
- (Puerto Rico) Alec Díaz
- (Puerto Rico) Gerald Díaz
- (Puerto Rico) Ricardo Rivera
- (Saint Vincent and the Grenadines) Shakeem Adams
- (Saint Vincent and the Grenadines) Steven Pierre
- (Saint Vincent and the Grenadines) Cornelius Stewart
- (Sint Maarten) Chovanie Amatkarijo

1 goal

- (Antigua and Barbuda) Daryl Massicot
- (Antigua and Barbuda) Javorn Stevens
- (Aruba) Javier Jiménez
- (Aruba) Jayden Kruydenhof
- (Aruba) Tyron Perret Gentil
- (Bermuda) Kole Hall
- (Bermuda) Zeiko Lewis
- (Bermuda) Djair Parfitt-Williams
- (Bermuda) Knory Scott
- (Bonaire) Ayrton Cicilia
- (Bonaire) Quincy Hoeve
- (Bonaire) Jort van der Sande
- (Curaçao) Leandro Bacuna
- (Curaçao) Joshua Brenet
- (Curaçao) Joshua Zimmerman
- (Dominica) Chad Bertrand
- (Dominica) Troy Jules
- (Dominica) Audel Laville
- (Dominican Republic) Jean Carlos López
- (Dominican Republic) Luiyi de Lucas
- (Dominican Republic) Rafael Mata
- (Dominican Republic) Erick Paniagua
- (El Salvador) Tereso Benitez
- (El Salvador) Francis Castillo
- (El Salvador) Rudy Clavel
- (El Salvador) Brayan Landaverde
- (El Salvador) Santos Ortíz
- (El Salvador) Kevin Santamaría
- (El Salvador) Rafael Tejada
- (Grenada) Jermaine Francis
- (Grenada) Myles Hippolyte
- (Grenada) Trevon Williams
- (Haiti) Markhus Lacroix
- (Haiti) Fafà Picault
- (Haiti) Mondy Prunier
- (Montserrat) Brandon Barzey
- (Montserrat) Donervorn Daniels
- (Montserrat) Lyle Taylor
- (Puerto Rico) Leandro Antonetti
- (Puerto Rico) Noeh Hernandez
- (Puerto Rico) Darren Ríos
- (Puerto Rico) Jaden Servania
- (Puerto Rico) Rodolfo Sulia
- (Saint Lucia) Donavan Baptiste
- (Saint Lucia) Ryan Charles
- (Saint Lucia) Chris Forino-Joseph
- (Saint Lucia) Arkell Jude-Boyd
- (Collectivity of Saint Martin) Pierre-Bertrand Arne
- (Collectivity of Saint Martin) Sacha Barakat
- (Collectivity of Saint Martin) Rahim Denis
- (Collectivity of Saint Martin) Axel Raga
- (Saint Vincent and the Grenadines) Kyle Edwards
- (Saint Vincent and the Grenadines) Brandon John
- (Sint Maarten) Quinton Christina
- (Sint Maarten) T-Shawn Illidge
- (Sint Maarten) Imar Kort
- (Sint Maarten) Gerwin Lake
- (Sint Maarten) Ronan Olivacce

1 own goal

- (Antigua and Barbuda) Zafique Drew (against Bermuda)
- (Bonaire) Quincy Hoeve (against El Salvador)
- (Dominica) Marcus Bredas (against Bermuda)
- (Saint Vincent and the Grenadines) Jamol Yorke (against Bonaire)
