= Dominic Hutchinson =

Turks and Caicos Islander association footballer

Personal information
- Full name: Dominic Charles Hutchinson
- Date of birth: 17 November 2001 (age 25)
- Place of birth: England
- Position: Midfielder

Team information
- Current team: Worthing
- Number: 10

Youth career
- 2010–2021: Watford

Senior career*
| Years | Team | Apps | (Gls) |
| 2021–2022 | Watford | 0 | (0) |
| 2021–2022 | → Eastbourne Borough (loan) | 29 | (8) |
| 2022–2026 | Wealdstone | 95 | (7) |
| 2023 | → Slough Town (loan) | 10 | (1) |
| 2023–2024 | → St Albans City (loan) | 21 | (3) |
| 2024–2025 | → St Albans City (loan) | 8 | (1) |
| 2026– | Worthing | 8 | (3) |

International career^{‡}
| 2026– | Turks and Caicos Islands | 3 | (1) |
- * Club domestic league appearances and goals as of 12:57, 22 September 2026 (UTC) ‡ National team caps and goals as of 00:12, 5 October 2026 (UTC)

Dominic Hutchinson (born 17 November 2001) is a Turks and Caicos Islander association footballer who currently plays for National League club Worthing and the Turks and Caicos Islands national team.

== Club career ==
Hutchinson is a product of the Watford Academy. In 2020, he served as captain of the under-18 side and scored sixteen goals. It was announced in August 2021 that the player was loaned to Eastbourne Borough for his first senior experience. He went on to score eight goals in twenty-nine appearances that season. Hutchinson left Watford and joined Wealdstone of the National League on a permanent transfer the following summer. He made twenty-five appearances for Wealdstone during his first season with the club. In September 2023, it was announced that he would go on loan to Slough Town until 1 January 2024. He went on out on loan to St Albans City in 2023 and 2024, signing a contract extension with Wealdstone in the interim. Back at Wealdstone, Hutchinson started and played seventy-eight minutes of the 2025–26 FA Trophy Final. Wealdstone held Southend United to a scoreless draw before falling 2–4 on penalties.

With his contract at Wealdstone set to expire in summer 2026, Hutchinson was linked to potential moves to League Two clubs Bristol Rovers and Gillingham. Between 2022 and 2026, the player appeared in over one hundred matches for Wealdstone. However, the parties were unable to reach an agreement on a new contract and the player departed the club in June 2026. Following his departure from Wealdstone, Hutchinson signed for fellow National League club Worthing on a contract of undisclosed length. He scored his first goal for the club in a 1–1 draw in a pre-season friendly with Frome Town on 18 July 2026. He went on to score his first two league goals on 12 September 2026 in a 2–2 draw to Barrow.

== International career ==
Hutchinson was called up to the Turks and Caicos Islands national team in September 2026 for four 2026–27 CONCACAF Nations League C matches against the British Virgin Islands and Montserrat.

=== International goals ===
Scores and results list the Turks and Caicos Islands' goal tally first.

| No. | Date | Venue | Opponent | Score | Result | Competition |
|---|---|---|---|---|---|---|
| 1 | 4 October 2026 | TCIFA National Academy, Providenciales, Turks and Caicos Islands | British Virgin Islands | 1–0 | 3–0 | 2026–27 CONCACAF Nations League C |
Last updated 4 October 2026

=== International career statistics ===
As of match played 4 October 2026

Turks and Caicos national team
| 2026 | 3 | 1 |
| Total | 3 | 1 |
