= Christopher Rahming =

Bahamian footballer (born 1999)

Chris Rahming
Personal information
- Full name: Christopher Matthew Rahming
- Date of birth: 27 April 1999 (age 27)
- Place of birth: Nassau, Bahamas
- Height: 1.96 m (6 ft 5 in)
- Position: Attacking midfielder

Team information
- Current team: Stallion Laguna
- Number: 27

College career
Years	Team	Apps	(Gls)
2017	Jefferson Rams	0	(0)

Senior career*
Years	Team	Apps	(Gls)
2017–2022	Western Warriors SC		
2022–2024	Castellaneta Calcio 1962		
2024–2025	Fencibles United	9	(0)
2025–2026	Olimpia Satu Mare	0	(0)
2026	FC London	16	(1)
2026–	Stallion Laguna	1	(0)

International career^{‡}
2018–	Bahamas	20	(2)
- * Club domestic league appearances and goals as of 28 June 2025 ‡ National team caps and goals as of 13:14, 30 September 2026 (UTC)

Christopher Matthew Rahming (born 27 April 1999) is a Bahamian footballer who plays for Stallion Laguna of the Philippines Football League, and the Bahamas national football team.

== Club career ==
In August 2022, Rahming signed for Italian club Castellaneta Calcio 1962. In August 2025, Rahming signed for Olimpia Satu Mare in the Liga II after playing for Northern League side Fencibles United.

In March 2026, Rahming signed for FC London in the Ontario Premier League.

== International career ==
Rahming made his senior international debut on 7 September 2018 in a 4–0 away defeat to Belize during CONCACAF Nations League qualifying.

=== International goals ===
Scores and results list the Bahamas' goal tally first.

No.	Date	Venue	Opponent	Score	Result	Competition
1.	8 September 2023	Thomas Robinson Stadium, Nassau, Bahamas	Puerto Rico	1–0	1–6	2023–24 CONCACAF Nations League B
2.	29 September 2026	Bethlehem Soccer Stadium, Upper Bethlehem, U.S. Virgin Islands	U.S. Virgin Islands	1–3	1–3	2026–27 CONCACAF Nations League C
Last updated 8 September 2023
