= Jacques Passy =

Mexican football manager (born 1975)

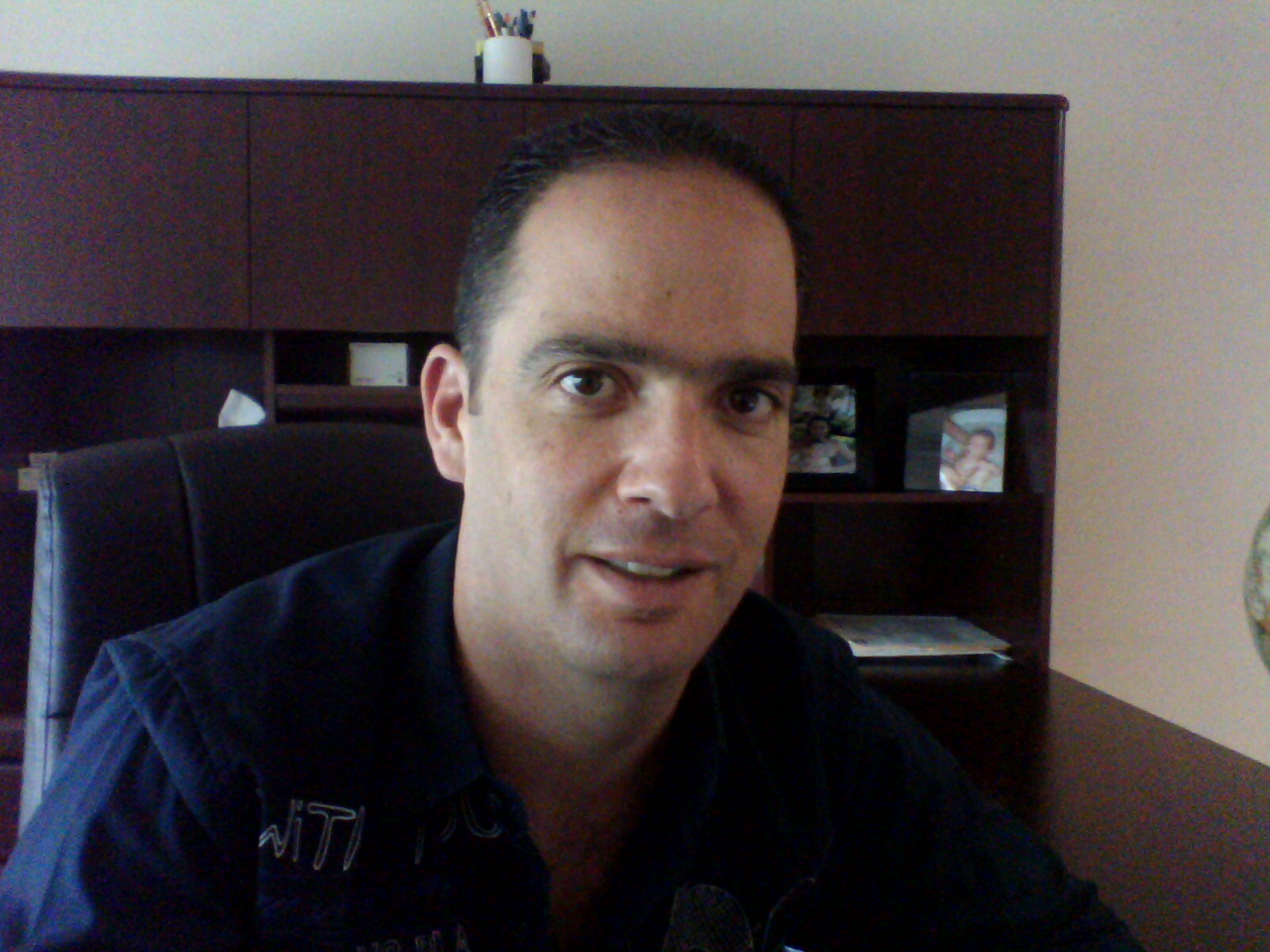

Personal information
- Full name: Jacques Antonio Passy Kahn
- Date of birth: 30 September 1975 (age 51)
- Place of birth: Mexico City, Mexico

Team information
- Current team: Antigua and Barbuda (head coach)

Managerial career
- Years: Team
- 2006: Dorados de Sinaloa (Interim)
- 2015–2018: Saint Kitts and Nevis
- 2020–2021: Dominican Republic U23
- 2020–2021: Dominican Republic
- 2024: Club de Cuervos (AKL)
- 2025–: Antigua and Barbuda

Jacques Antonio Passy Kahn (born 30 September 1975) is a Mexican professional football manager who is currently the head coach of the Antigua and Barbuda national football team.

== Managerial career ==
Passy holds coaching badges from the Mexican Football Federation and the Peruvian Football Federation in addition to taking specialized courses at the Dutch KNVB. In 2006, Passy was technical director and coach of Dorados de Sinaloa as they reached Liga MX where he was the youngest coach in the top flight. He has also been coach of the Mexico team at European and Pan-American Maccabiah Games since 2004. As of 2015, he accumulated 14 victories over 4 tournaments and almost reached the final. He was called "The most decorated coach in the Maccabiah" by a columnist for the Jerusalem Post. Other positions he has held include coach of Deportivo Israelita and president of Mexico's University of Johan Cruyff where he has trained over 400 managers. In this position, he worked closely with Latin American teams for consulting and training. He has established close ties with many clubs including Chivas de Guadalajara, Club América, and Maccabi Tel Aviv.

=== Saint Kitts and Nevis ===
Passy was named national team manager of Saint Kitts and Nevis in 2015 after impressing FA officials during a conference at which he spoke. His first matches as the manager were against El Salvador during 2018 FIFA World Cup qualification. He also worked as technical director.

In November 2015, the team traveled to Europe for matches against Andorra and Estonia, the nation's first matches in history against European opponents. Devaughn Elliott scored the only goal in the 1–0 victory over Andorra for Saint Kitts and Nevis's first European victory. The result was also the first away victory for a CFU team over a European side on their home soil. During his Tenure, Passy took the team to a record high 73 in the FIFA ranking, 86 spots higher than when he took over the team.

In 2018, he was named as a finalist for the CONCACAF Coach of the Year.

=== Dominican Republic ===
In August 2020, Passy was appointed coach of the Dominican Republic under-23 national team, to direct it in the 2020 CONCACAF Men's Olympic Qualifying Championship. Shortly thereafter he was also named manager of the senior national team.

== Managerial statistics ==
As of matches played 8 June 2021

Managerial record by team and tenure
Team	From	To	Record								Ref
Team	From	To	G	W	D	L	GF	GA	GD	Win %	Ref
Saint Kitts and Nevis	2015	2018	25	10	5	10	31	32	−1	40.00	
Dominican Republic	2020	2021	6	2	2	2	8	5	+3	33.33	
Career totals			31	12	7	12	39	37	+2	38.71	
