= Brandon Barzey =

Montserrat international footballer

Personal information
- Full name: Brandon James Barzey
- Date of birth: 27 July 1999 (age 27)
- Place of birth: Hammersmith, England
- Position: Winger

Team information
- Current team: Hanworth Villa

Youth career
- –2017: Queens Park Rangers

Senior career*
| Years | Team | Apps | (Gls) |
| 2017 | Staines Town | 1 | (0) |
| 2017 | Spelthorne Sports | 1 | (0) |
| 2019–2021 | Hanworth Villa | 14 | (4) |
| 2020 | → Staines Town (loan) | 2 | (0) |
| 2021–2023 | Hampton & Richmond Borough | 40 | (4) |
| 2021 | → Walton & Hersham (loan) | 2 | (0) |
| 2021 | → Hanworth Villa (loan) | 2 | (2) |
| 2021–2022 | → Chesham United (loan) | 10 | (4) |
| 2023–2024 | Dartford | 18 | (3) |
| 2023–2024 | → Hemel Hempstead Town (loan) | 6 | (1) |
| 2024–2025 | Hemel Hempstead Town | 32 | (11) |
| 2026– | Hanworth Villa | 4 | (2) |

International career^{‡}
| 2022– | Montserrat | 21 | (6) |
- * Club domestic league appearances and goals as of 18:43, 19 September 2026 (UTC) ‡ National team caps and goals as of 15:50, 13 November 2026 (UTC)

Brandon James Barzey (born 27 July 1999) is a footballer who plays for Southern League Premier Division South club Hanworth Villa, and the Montserrat national team.

== Club career ==
Barzey began his career in the academy at Queens Park Rangers before being released as an 18 year old in 2017. He then briefly joined Staines Town and Spelthorne Sports before resurfacing in the 2019–20 season at Hanworth Villa, where he stayed until the end of the 2020–21 season, with the exception of a brief return to Staines. Barzey signed for Hampton & Richmond Borough in the summer of 2021. After loans at Walton & Hersham, Hanworth Villa and Chesham United, Barzey established himself in the first team before joining Dartford ahead of the 2022–23 season. On 15 December 2023, Barzey joined Hemel Hempstead Town on a one-month loan.

In May 2024, he joined Hemel Hempstead Town on a permanent basis. He departed the club at the end of the 2024–25 season.

In May 2026, Barzey returned to Hanworth Villa following their promotion to the Southern League Premier Division South.

== International career ==
After being approached by a Montserrat international player on Instagram, Barzey received his first call up to the national team in June 2022.

== Personal life ==
A semi-professional footballer, Barzey has worked in construction and has also delivered parcels for Amazon.

== Career statistics ==
=== International ===
As of match played 1 October 2026

Appearances and goals by national team and year
| National team | Year | Apps | Goals |
|---|---|---|---|
| Montserrat | 2022 | 3 | 0 |
| Montserrat | 2023 | 6 | 2 |
| Montserrat | 2024 | 8 | 2 |
| Montserrat | 2026 | 3 | 2 |
| Total | | 20 | 6 |

Scores and results list Montserrat's goal tally first, score column indicates score after each Barzey goal.

List of international goals scored by Brandon Barzey
| No. | Date | Venue | Opponent | Score | Result | Competition |
|---|---|---|---|---|---|---|
| 1 | 17 November 2023 | Blakes Estate Stadium, Lookout, Montserrat | Dominican Republic | 1–0 | 2–1 | 2023–24 CONCACAF Nations League B |
| 2 | 20 November 2023 | Blakes Estate Stadium, Lookout, Montserrat | Barbados | 1–0 | 4–2 | 2023–24 CONCACAF Nations League B |
| 3 | 5 June 2024 | Nicaragua National Football Stadium, Managua, Nicaragua | Nicaragua | 1–1 | 1–4 | 2026 FIFA World Cup qualification |
| 4 | 5 September 2024 | Stadion Antonio Trenidat, Rincon, Bonaire | El Salvador | 1–1 | 1–4 | 2024–25 CONCACAF Nations League B |
| 5 | 26 September 2026 | TCIFA National Academy, Providenciales, Turks and Caicos Islands | British Virgin Islands | 1–0 | 3–0 | 2026–27 CONCACAF Nations League C |
| 6 | 1 October 2026 | TCIFA National Academy, Providenciales, Turks and Caicos Islands | British Virgin Islands | 1–0 | 2–0 | 2026–27 CONCACAF Nations League C |
