= Rolston Williams =

Antigua and Barbudan footballer and manager (1965–2020)

Personal information
- Date of birth: 3 February 1965
- Place of birth: Antigua and Barbuda
- Date of death: 14 October 2020 (aged 55)
- Position: Midfielder

Managerial career
- Years: Team
- 2004: Antigua and Barbuda
- 200?–: Parham FC
- 2010–2011: Antigua and Barbuda women's
- 2011: Antigua and Barbuda U20
- 2012: Antigua and Barbuda U17
- 2012–2018: Antigua and Barbuda

Rolston 'Debu' Williams (3 February 1965 − 14 October 2020) was an Antiguan and Barbudan former professional football player and manager.

== Career ==
In 2004, he coached the Antigua and Barbuda national football team. Later on, he was a head coach of the Parham FC. He also worked with the Antigua and Barbuda women's national football team and the U20 and U17 teams.

In November of 2012, he again became the head coach of the Antigua and Barbuda team.

Rolston Debu Williams died on October 14, 2020 at the age of 55. Two days before his death, he was admitted to the local hospital about numbness in his legs.
