= Dominique Rénia =

French professional football manager

Personal information
- Place of birth: Saint Martin

Managerial career
- Years: Team
- 2012: Saint Martin

Dominique Rénia is a French professional football manager. In 2012, he coached the Saint Martin national football team.
