= Gérard Andy =

French football manager

Personal information
- Place of birth: France

Managerial career
- Years: Team
- 2006–2008: Saint Martin

Gérard Andy is a French professional football manager who manages Phare Petit-Canal in the Guadeloupe Division of Honor. From 2006 to 2008, he managed the Saint Martin national football team.
