= Santos Ortíz =

Salvadoran footballer (born 1990)

Santos Ortiz
Personal information
- Full name: José Santos Ortiz Asencio
- Date of birth: 22 January 1990 (age 36)
- Place of birth: San Miguel, El Salvador
- Height: 1.74 m (5 ft 9 in)
- Position: Midfielder

Team information
- Current team: Águila
- Number: 12

Senior career*
Years	Team	Apps	(Gls)
2012–2014	Dragón	55	(3)
2015–	Águila	188	(14)

International career^{‡}
2014–	El Salvador	20	(2)
- * Club domestic league appearances and goals as of 26 May 2019 ‡ National team caps and goals as of 7 June 2025

José Santos Ortiz Asencio, known as Santos Ortiz (born 22 January 1990), is a Salvadoran professional footballer who plays as a midfielder for Primera División club Águila and the El Salvador national team.

== International ==
He made his El Salvador national football team debut on 30 August 2014 in a friendly against Dominican Republic.

He was selected for the 2019 CONCACAF Gold Cup squad.

=== International goals ===
Scores and results list El Salvador's goal tally first.

No.	Date	Venue	Opponent	Score	Result	Competition
1	10 October 2024	Arnos Vale Stadium, Arnos Vale, Saint Vincent and the Grenadines	Saint Vincent and the Grenadines	2–2	3–2	2024–25 CONCACAF Nations League
2	7 June 2025	Raymond E. Guishard Technical Centre, The Valley, Anguilla	Anguilla	1–0	3–0	2026 FIFA World Cup qualification
