= Kylano Isaac =

Antiguan footballer

Personal information
- Full name: Kylano Kazym Zugan Isaac
- Date of birth: 10 January 2005 (age 21)
- Place of birth: St. Philip's, Antigua and Barbuda
- Height: 1.83 m (6 ft 0 in)
- Position: Defender

College career
Years	Team	Apps	(Gls)
2025–2026	Graceland Yellowjackets	0	(0)

Senior career*
Years	Team	Apps	(Gls)
2022–2024	Ottos Rangers		

International career^{‡}
2025–	Antigua and Barbuda	4	(0)
- * Club domestic league appearances and goals as of 19:32, 16 January 2026 (UTC) ‡ National team caps and goals as of 19:32, 16 January 2026 (UTC)

Kylano Kazym Zugan Isaac (born 10 January 2005) is an Antiguan footballer who plays for the Antigua and Barbuda national team.

== Club career ==
Domestically, Isaac played for Ottos Rangers FC since at least 2022 in both the First Division and Premier Division. He remained with the club through December 2024. Later that year, he committed to playing college soccer in the United States for the Yellowjackets of Graceland University, but did not appear for the team during the season.

In mid-2025, Isaac joined the Future Pro development program in England. By December of that year, he earned a trial with the under-21 side of Blackburn Rovers. The following month, he went on trial with Chojniczanka Chojnice of Poland's II liga.

== International career ==
As a youth, Isaac represented Antigua and Barbuda in 2024 CONCACAF U-20 Championship qualifying. He made his senior international debut on 6 June 2025 in a 2026 FIFA World Cup qualification match against Cuba.

=== International career statistics ===
As of match played 10 November 2025

Antigua and Barbuda
Year	Apps	Goals
2025	4	0
Total	4	0
