= Kayonte George =

Antiguan footballer

Personal information
- Full name: Kayonte Kaheim Karim George
- Date of birth: 8 January 2007 (age 19)
- Place of birth: St. John's, Antigua and Barbuda
- Height: 1.75 m (5 ft 9 in)
- Position: Midfielder

Youth career
- –2022: Empire
- 2022–2023: VfB Waltrop
- 2023–2026: SC Paderborn
- 2026: Arminia Bielefeld

International career^{‡}
Years	Team	Apps	(Gls)
2026–	Antigua and Barbuda	2	(1)
- ‡ National team caps and goals as of 17:57, 29 September 2026 (UTC)

Kayonte George (born 8 January 2007) is an Antiguan footballer who plays for the Antigua and Barbuda national team.

== Club career ==
George was raised in the Grays Green neighborhood of St. John's. As a youth, he began playing domestically with his local neighbourhood club Empire FC. In 2022, local coach Kerry Skepple arranged for him to move to Europe to join small local club VfB Waltrop in Germany. After adjusting to the playstyle, he was approached by the academies of larger clubs. He went on trial with FC Schalke 04 and was offered a contract. However, he eventually chose to join SC Paderborn 07 in summer 2023 because of the promise of more playing time. He initially linked up with the club's under-17 side. By February 2026, he had transferred to 2. Bundesliga club Arminia Bielefeld and played for the club's under-19 team in the DFB Youth League. That season, he scored in a league match against Hertha Berlin U19.

In July 2026, George attended a talent showcase in Spain. There he was noticed by scouts from Casa Pia A.C. of Portugal's Primeira Liga. The player then said in an interview that a deal between him and the club was imminent. However, in September 2026 he was still a free agent.

== International career ==
In February 2026, it was announced by head coach Schyan Jeffers that George would captain the Antigua and Barbuda national under-20 team during 2026 CONCACAF U-20 Championship qualifying. During qualification, Antigua and Barbuda topped Group C and qualified for the final tournament. However, George was then excluded from the squad for disciplinary reasons following an encounter with Jeffers.

George was called up to the senior national team in September 2026 for four 2026–27 CONCACAF Nations League C matches. He made his senior international debut on 23 September 2026 in the nation's opening match against Aruba. Three days later, he scored his first senior international goal in a 5–0 victory over Anguilla.

=== International goals ===
Scores and results list Antigua and Barbuda's goal tally first.

No.	Date	Venue	Opponent	Score	Result	Competition
1	26 September 2026	Sir Vivian Richards Stadium, North Sound, Antigua and Barbuda	Anguilla	5–0	5–0	2026–27 CONCACAF Nations League C
Last updated 29 September 2026

=== International career statistics ===
As of match played 26 September 2026

Antigua and Barbuda
Year	Apps	Goals
2026	2	1
Total	2	1
