= Yanis Montantin =

Saint Martin footballer (born 1999)

Personal information
- Full name: Yanis Robert Montantin
- Date of birth: 2 August 1999 (age 27)
- Place of birth: France
- Height: 1.75 m (5 ft 9 in)
- Position: Midfielder

Youth career
- –2017: Troyes

Senior career*
Years	Team	Apps	(Gls)
2017–2018	US Torcy		
2018–2019	Le Mée Sports Football	18	(1)
2019–2021	Bourges Foot 18	25	(2)
2021–2022	FC Ouest Tourangeau	24	(2)
2022–2026	Rodange 91	118	(12)

International career
2024-	Saint Martin	5	(0)
- * Club domestic league appearances and goals as of 13 June 2026

Yanis Robert Montantin (born 2 August 1999) is a professional footballer who plays as a midfielder. Born in France, he is a Saint Martin international.

== Club career ==
A native of Paris, France, Montantin joined the youth academy of French side ES Troyes AC as a youth player. In 2017, he started his senior career with French side US Torcy, before signing for French side Le Mée Sports Football in 2018. One year later, he signed for French side Bourges Foot 18, helping the club achieve promotion from the French fifth tier to the French fourth tier. Following his stint there, he signed for French side FC Ouest Tourangeau. Subsequently, he signed for Luxembourgish side FC Rodange 91 in 2022, helping the club achieve promotion from the Luxembourgish second tier to the Luxembourg top flight. While playing for them, Luxembourgish news portal described him as a "pillar" of the team.

== International career ==
On 6 September 2024, Montantin debuted for the Saint Martin national football team during a 0–2 away loss to the Grenada national football team in the CONCACAF Nations League.
