= David Baltase =

French professional football manager and technical director

Personal information
- Full name: David Laurent Baltase
- Date of birth: 29 September 1971 (age 55)
- Place of birth: France

Team information
- Current team: Fiji Football Association (Technical Director)

Managerial career
- Years: Team
- 1993–1999: CS Meaux (U15)
- 1999–2004: Tours FC (U17)
- 2004–2007: Tours FC (Fitness)
- 2007–2008: US Changé
- 2008–2011: FFF Seine-et-Marne (Technical Director)
- 2008–2011: Guadeloupe (Fitness)
- 2010: Saint Martin
- 2011–2013: FC Bassin d'Arcachon
- 2013–2017: Casablanca AS / PSG Academy
- 2017: New Caledonia U17
- 2017: Vanuatu U20
- 2018–2019: Saint Martin
- 2019–2022: FFF Brittany (Technical Director)
- 2022–2024: Cameroon (Technical Staff)
- 2024–2025: Haiti (Assistant)
- 2025–: Fiji FA (Technical Director)

David Laurent Baltase (born 29 September 1971) is a French professional football manager, coach, and technical director. With over three decades of international experience across Europe, Oceania, Africa, and the Caribbean, he has held key leadership, coaching, and high-performance roles for several national federations and top-flight youth academies.

== Early career in France (1993–2013) ==
David Baltase began his coaching career with CS Meaux, managing the under-15 side in the French National Championship from 1993 to 1999. In 1999, he joined Tours FC, leading the under-17 squad until 2004, before working for three seasons as the strength and conditioning coach for the club's professional first team in Ligue 2.

From 2007 to 2008, he served as head coach and technical director of US Changé. Baltase was subsequently named Technical Director for the French Football Federation (FFF) in Seine-et-Marne (2008–2011). Concurrently, he served as physical performance coach for the Guadeloupe national football team, taking part in the 2009 CONCACAF Gold Cup and 2011 CONCACAF Gold Cup campaigns. In 2010, he co-managed the Saint Martin national football team, before returning to French club football as head coach and technical director of FC Bassin d'Arcachon from 2011 to 2013.

== International development and youth World Cups (2013–2022) ==
Between 2013 and 2017, Baltase worked in Morocco as the athletic director at Casablanca American School and trained young prospects at the Paris Saint-Germain Academy.

In 2017, he managed two different Pacific youth national teams at major FIFA tournaments: the New Caledonia U17 team at the 2017 FIFA U-17 World Cup in India, and the Vanuatu U20 team at the 2017 FIFA U-20 World Cup in South Korea.

He was appointed head coach and technical director of the Saint Martin national football team and local federation in 2018, leading the squad during the inaugural CONCACAF Nations League qualifying phase. Between 2019 and 2022, he served as Technical Director for the French Football Federation in the Brittany region.

== Senior international management and technical direction (2022–present) ==
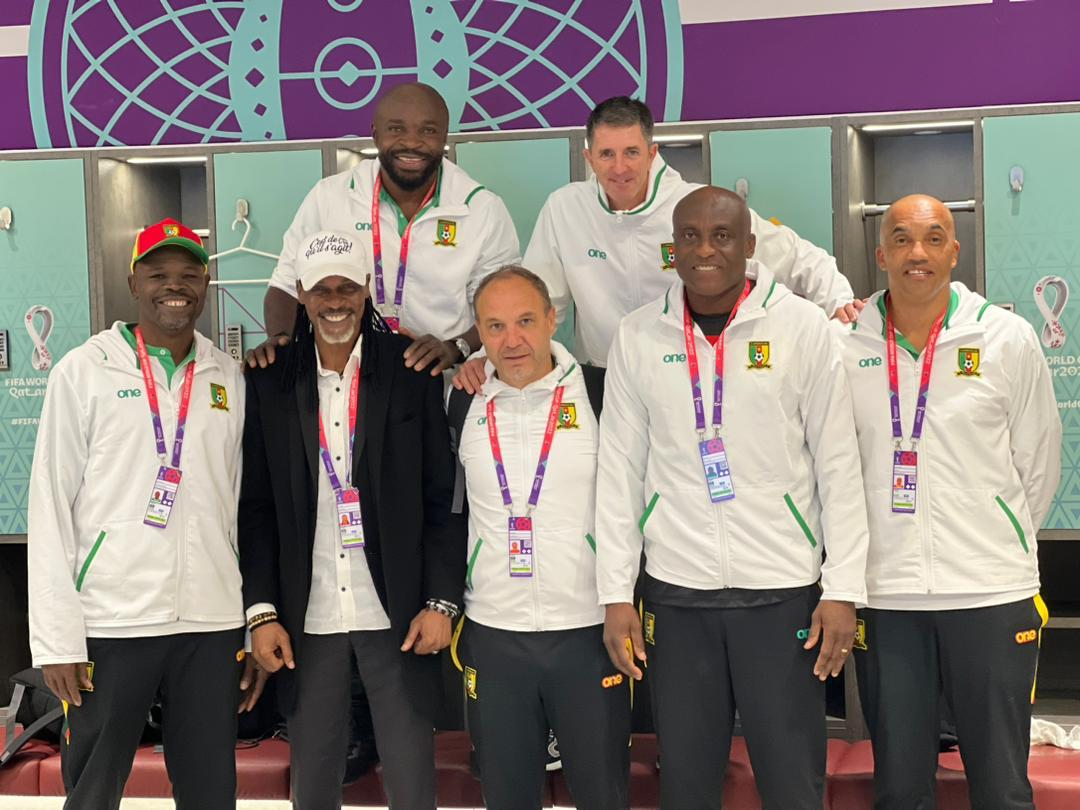
Baltase (far right) with the Cameroon national team technical staff and head coach Rigobert Song

From 2022 to 2024, Baltase joined the technical staff of the Cameroon national football team, actively participating in the Indomitable Lions' qualification and campaign at both the 2022 FIFA World Cup in Qatar and the 2023 Africa Cup of Nations in Ivory Coast.

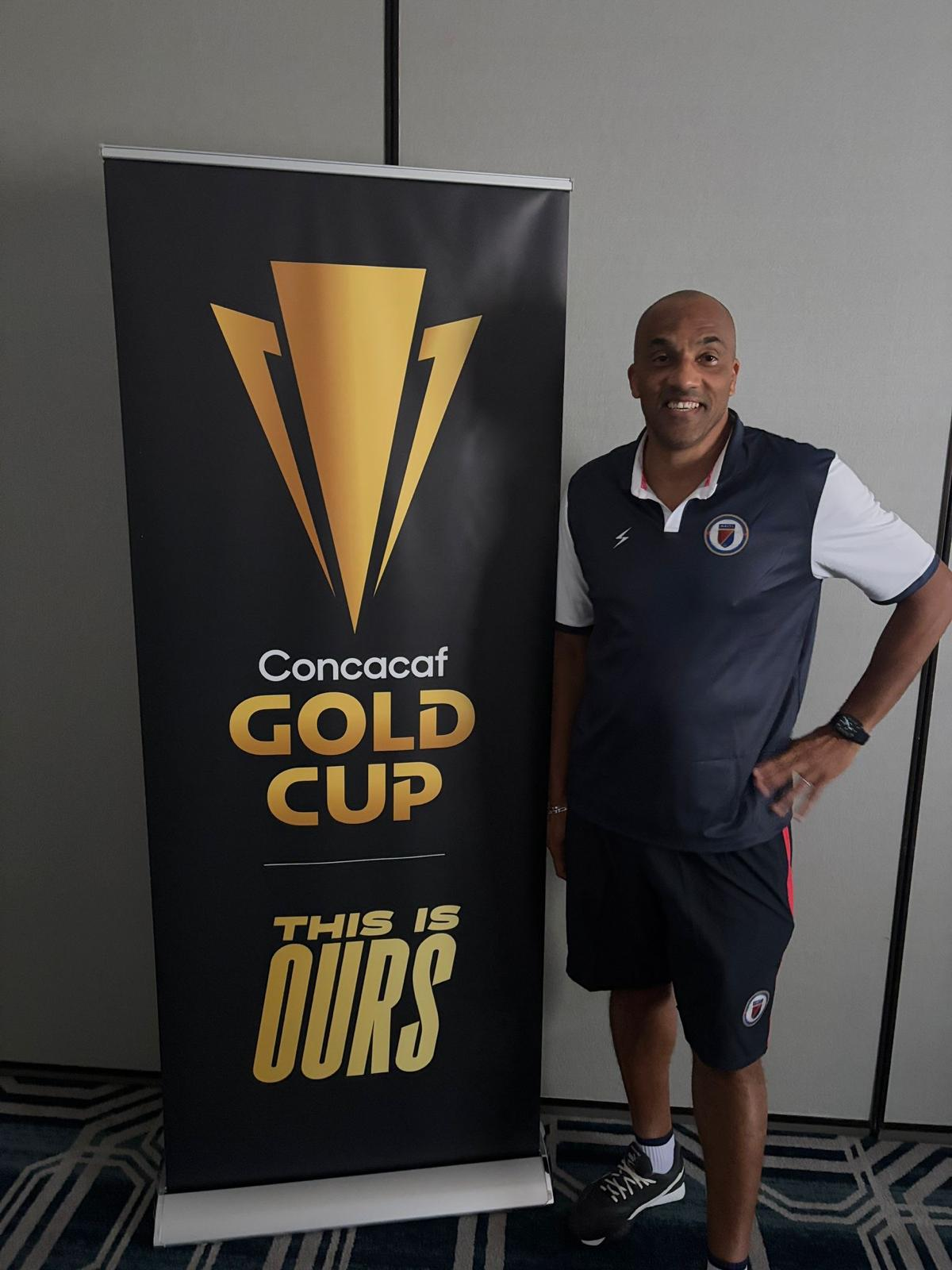
Baltase representing the Haiti national football team ahead of the CONCACAF Gold Cup campaign

In 2024, Baltase was appointed assistant coach of the Haiti national football team under Sébastien Migné, helping guide Les Grenadiers through their 2026 FIFA World Cup qualification fixtures and the 2025 CONCACAF Gold Cup.

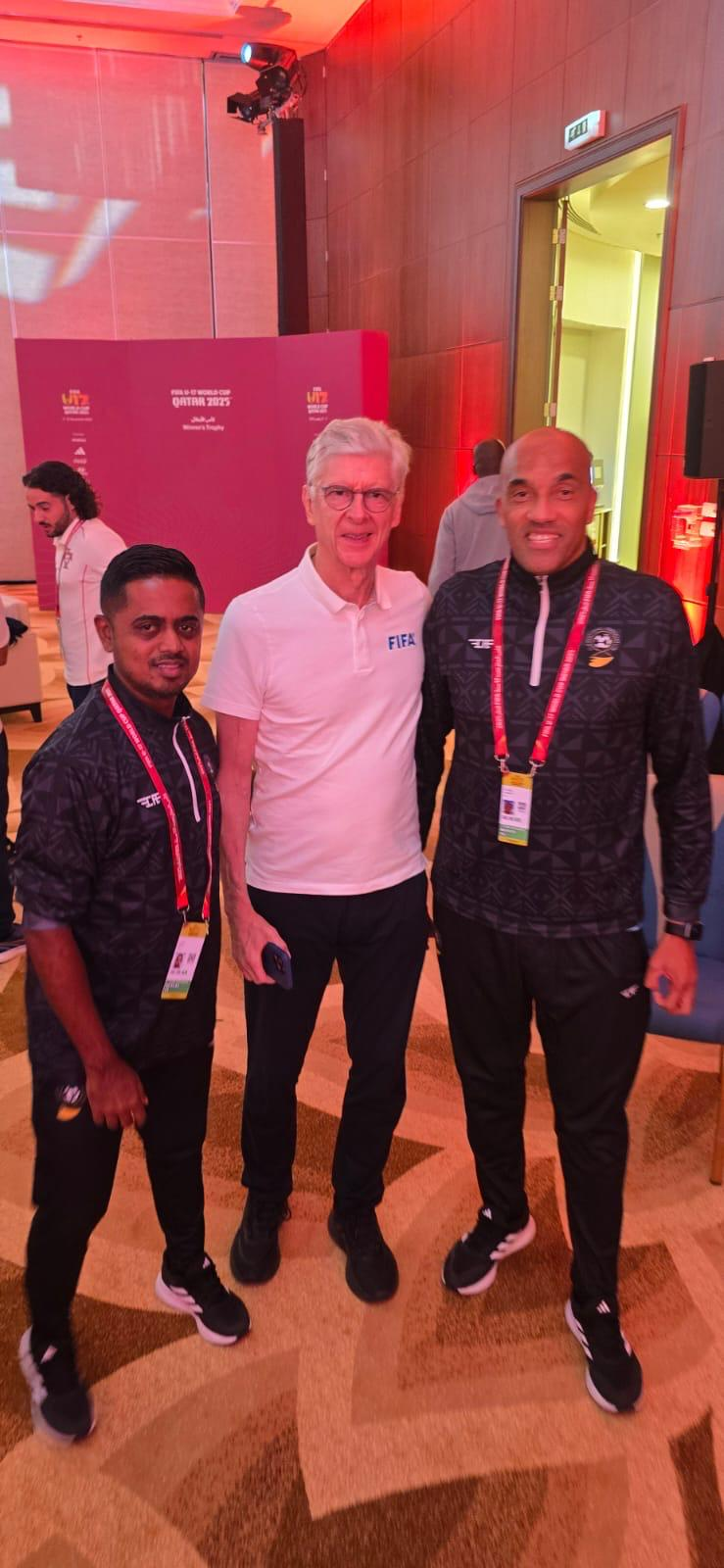
Baltase (right), Technical Director of the Fiji FA, with FIFA Chief of Global Football Development Arsène Wenger

In 2025, Baltase was appointed Technical Director of the Fiji Football Association, taking charge of grassroots development, talent identification pathways, national coaching education, and elite team preparation across all age categories.

== Qualifications and credentials ==
Baltase holds top-tier European, national, and state diplomas:

- UEFA A Licence – Diplôme d'Entraîneur de Football (DEF)
- Certificat de Formateur Cadre Technique (CFCT FFF) – Technical Director Diploma
- DESJEPS – French State Certificate of Sports Educator (2nd Degree)
- DUEPP – University Diploma in Strength and Physical Conditioning
- Performance Video Analysis Diploma
