= Mattéo Makhabe =

French association footballer (born 2003)

Personal information
- Date of birth: 28 November 2003 (age 22)
- Place of birth: Bourges, France
- Height: 1.70 m (5 ft 7 in)
- Position: Midfielder

Team information
- Current team: Lille
- Number: 19

Youth career
- 2010–2011: Gazelec Bourges
- 2011–2012: ES Justices
- 2012–2014: Bourges
- 2014–2020: Lyon
- 2020–2022: Lille

Senior career*
Years	Team	Apps	(Gls)
2022–	Lille II	26	(1)
2023–	Lille	0	(0)
- * Club domestic league appearances and goals as of 06:14, 23 January 2023 (UTC)

Mattéo Makhabe (born 28 November 2003) is a French professional footballer who plays as a midfielder for Lille.

== Career ==
Makhabe began playing football with Gazelec in 2010, followed by a one year stint at Justices before moving to Bourges. He gained notoriety as a youngster due to a YouTube video showcasing his skills that went viral with over a million views. He trialled with Lyon in 2013, and joined their youth team shortly after. On 9 August 2020, he moved to the youth academy of Lille. He began his career with their reserves in 2022, and started training with Lille's senior team in December 2022. He made his professional and senior debut with Lille as a late substitute in a 2–0 Coupe de France win over Pau FC in January 2023.
