= Antigua and Barbuda national football team =

Men's association football team

Antigua and Barbuda
- Nickname: The Benna Boys
- Association: Antigua and Barbuda Football Association (ABFA)
- Confederation: CONCACAF (North America)
- Sub-confederation: CFU (Caribbean)
- Head coach: Jacques Passy
- Captain: Quinton Griffith
- Most caps: Quinton Griffith (93)
- Top scorer: Peter Byers (44)
- Home stadium: Antigua Recreation Ground; Sir Vivian Richards Stadium
- FIFA code: ATG
First colours	Second colours

FIFA ranking
- Current: 164 ▼2 (18 November 2026)
- Highest: 70 (October 2014)
- Lowest: 170 (December 2003 – January 2004)

First international
- (British Leeward Islands) Antigua and Barbuda 2–0 Montserrat (Basseterre, Saint Christopher and Nevis; 1 February 1950)

Biggest win
- Antigua and Barbuda 10–0 U.S. Virgin Islands (North Sound, Antigua and Barbuda; 11 October 2011)

Biggest defeat
- Trinidad and Tobago 11–1 Antigua and Barbuda (Port of Spain, Trinidad and Tobago; 10 November 1972)

CFU Championship / Caribbean Cup
- Appearances: 11 (first in 1978)
- Best result: Runners-up (1988)
Medal record
CFU Championship
Silver medal – second place	1988 Martinique	Team

The Antigua and Barbuda national football team represents Antigua and Barbuda in men's international football, and is governed by the Antigua and Barbuda Football Association, the governing body for football in Antigua and Barbuda founded in 1928. It has been a full member of FIFA and CONCACAF since 1972, and is also a member of CFU in the Caribbean Zone.

Antigua and Barbuda has never qualified for the FIFA World Cup and the CONCACAF Gold Cup, but has participated four times in the League B and once in League C of the CONCACAF Nations League. In subcontinental competitions, the team finished as runners-up in the 1988 CFU Championship.

Antigua and Barbuda's debut in international competitions was in the 1973 CONCACAF Championship, which also served as the CONCACAF qualifiers for the 1974 FIFA World Cup. The team's first victory was in 1950 by defeating Montserrat 2–0 in the Leeward Islands Tournament, which was also its first match ever.

== History ==
=== First official international match ===
On November 10, 1972, Antigua and Barbuda's first official match was in the 1973 CONCACAF Championship qualification, losing to Trinidad and Tobago 11–1 in Port of Spain, which is the worst defeat in the team's history.

=== Friendlies against European teams ===
On 17 December 2005, the Antigua and Barbuda national team played their first match against a European opponent after the Hungarian Football Federation invited "the Benna Boys" to play Hungary in an international friendly at Lockhart Stadium in Fort Lauderdale, Florida. This was the first match coached by former national striker Derrick Edwards. Hungary defeated Antigua and Barbuda 3–0.

On 2 May 2016, the Estonian Football Association announced that their national team would play Antigua and Barbuda in an international friendly on 22 November. It was the team's second match against a European opponent. Estonia won the game 1–0.

=== 2018 drug bust in Jamaica ===
During the March 2018 FIFA Calendar Antigua and Barbuda played Jamaica, drawing 1–1 away at Sabina Park, levelling in the last seconds of match from a header from Peter Byers. Upon the team's preparation for their departure back to Antigua, assistant coach Derrick Edwards and equipment manager Danny Benjamin were arrested and charged with possession of, dealing in, and taking steps to export marijuana, and conspiracy at the Norman Manley International Airport. Initially, Edwards was awarded bail and Benjamin was held without bail; after a month, both Edwards and Benjamin were placed under house arrest and curfew and gave up their travel documents. Both men were acquitted of the crime on 14 June, citing there was not enough evidence to prove their involvement in the carrying the drugs with the intention of smuggling them out of Jamaica.

== Team image ==
=== Nicknames ===
The official nickname of the Antigua and Barbuda national football team is "the Benna Boys", referring to a genre of Antiguan and Barbudan music similar to calypso. The name was selected in a contest with the fanbase in 2012 after the team advanced to the third round of the 2014 World Cup qualifiers. "The Benna Boys" beat out other entries in the contest such as "Beach Boys", "Iron Bandits", "Rhythm Warriors" and "Party Crashers". In the past, the national team was unofficially known as "the Wadadli Boys", another name that was in the contest but did not win.

=== Kit suppliers ===
The kit of the national team has been manufactured by Spanish-based Joma since March 2021, ahead of the first round of the 2022 World Cup qualifiers.

Kit manufacturer	Time period
Admiral	1995–1999
Virma	2000–2003
Adidas	2006–2011
Peak	2012–2016
Admiral	2016–2020
Joma	2021–present

== Results and fixtures ==
The following is a list of match results in the last 12 months, as well as any future matches that have been scheduled.

Win Draw Loss Fixture

=== 2025 ===
12 November 2025–26 CONCACAF Series	Antigua and Barbuda	0–0	Aruba	North Sound, Antigua and Barbuda
19:00 UTC−4		Report		Stadium: Sir Vivian Richards Stadium

18 November 2025–26 CONCACAF Series	Antigua and Barbuda	1–4	Guyana	North Sound, Antigua and Barbuda
	Griffith 61' (pen.)	Report	Glasgow 12', 23' (pen.); De Rosario 71'; Duke-McKenna 76'	Stadium: Sir Vivian Richards Stadium; Referee: Andrew Samuel (Trinidad and Tobago)

=== 2026 ===
23 September 2026–27 CONCACAF Nations League C	Aruba	1–0	Antigua and Barbuda	North Sound, Antigua and Barbuda
19:00 UTC−4	Molina 90+3'	Report		Stadium: Sir Vivian Richards Stadium; Attendance: 1,032; Referee: Olivier Jean Alexandre (Haiti)

26 September 2026–27 CONCACAF Nations League C	Antigua and Barbuda	5–0	Anguilla	North Sound, Antigua and Barbuda
19:00 UTC−4	Douglas 1', 21'; Pereira 16'; Bishop 35'; George 43'	Report		Stadium: Sir Vivian Richards Stadium; Attendance: 3,674; Referee: Wikelson Bonnet (Haiti)

1 October 2026–27 CONCACAF Nations League C	Anguilla	0–3	Antigua and Barbuda	North Sound, Antigua and Barbuda
19:00 UTC−4		Report	Bishop 35', 64'; Tomlinson 74'	Stadium: Sir Vivian Richards Stadium; Attendance: 873; Referee: Mendy Pierre (Martinique)

6 October 2026–27 CONCACAF Nations League C	Antigua and Barbuda	3–2	Aruba	North Sound, Antigua and Barbuda
19:00 UTC−4	Tomlinson 5'; Bramble 11'; Satchell 86'	Report	Bennett 14'; Fermina 50'	Stadium: Sir Vivian Richards Stadium; Referee: Melvin Matamoros (Honduras)

12 November 2026–27 CONCACAF Nations League Play-in	Antigua and Barbuda	2–3	Trinidad and Tobago	North Sound, Antigua and Barbuda
19:00 UTC−4	Telfer 3' (o.g.); Satchell 90+3'	Report	Gilbet 15'; Gill 25'; Garcia 45'	Stadium: Sir Vivian Richards Stadium; Referee: Adonis Carrasco (Dominican Republic)

16 November 2026–27 CONCACAF Nations League Play-in	Trinidad and Tobago	v	Antigua and Barbuda	Port of Spain, Trinidad and Tobago
20:00 UTC−4		Report		Stadium: Hasely Crawford Stadium

== Coaching staff ==
=== Current coaching staff ===
Name	Position
(Mexico) Jacques Passy	Head coach
(Antigua and Barbuda) Janiel Simon	Manager
(Antigua and Barbuda) Lenny Hewlett	Assistant coach
(Antigua and Barbuda) Schyan Jeffers	Assistant coach
(Spain) Eduardo Suarez	Assistant coach
(Spain) Juan Lecona Nava	Goalkeeper coach
(Antigua and Barbuda) McClean Lawrence	Physiotherapist
(Antigua and Barbuda) Danny Benjamin	Equipment manager

=== Manager history ===
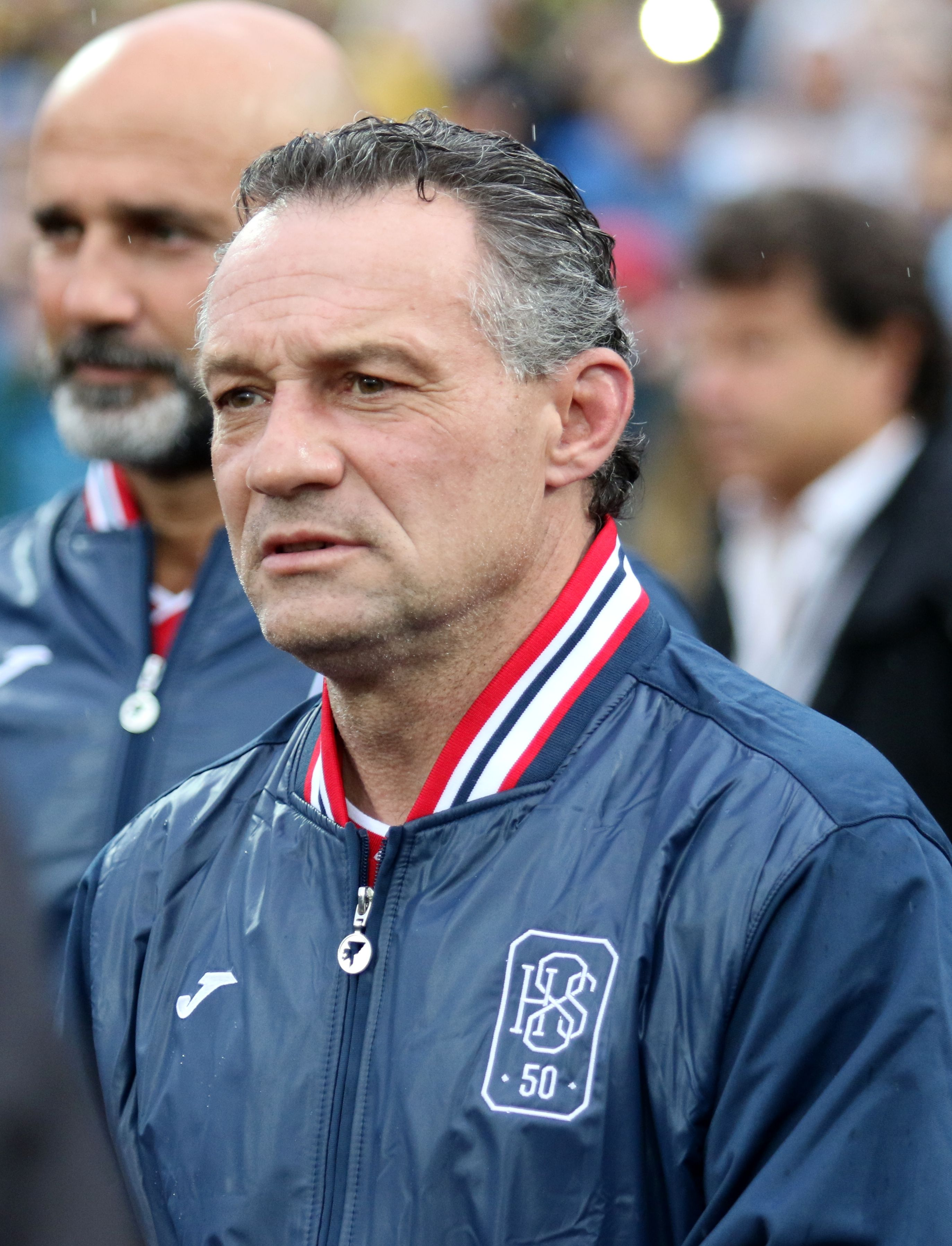
Polish manager Piotr Nowak was at the helm of Antigua and Barbuda when they achieved their highest FIFA ranking (70) in October 2014.

The following is a list of head coaches of the Antigua and Barbuda national team throughout the years.

Name	Period	Matches	Wins	Draws	Losses	Notes
(West Germany) Rudi Gutendorf	1976					
(Serbia and Montenegro) Zoran Vraneš	1998–2000					Fourth place at the 1998 Caribbean Cup
(Brazil) Walter Gama	2001–2002					
(Antigua and Barbuda) Rolston Williams	2004					
(Antigua and Barbuda) Derrick Edwards	2005–2008					
(Scotland) Willie Donachie	2008	16	8	3	5	
(Antigua and Barbuda) Rowan Benjamin	2008–2011	11	4	3	4	
(England) Tom Curtis	2011–2012	21	8	3	10	Semifinal round of the 2014 World Cup Qualifiers
(Antigua and Barbuda) Rolston Williams	2012–2014	6	4	0	2	
(Poland) Piotr Nowak	2014–2015	12	5	2	5	Highest FIFA Ranking (70) under his tenure
(Antigua and Barbuda) Rolston Williams	2015–2018	8	3	0	5	
(Antigua and Barbuda) Derrick Edwards	2018–2019	6	2	1	3	
(Democratic Republic of the Congo) Michél Dinzey	2019–2020	10	4	0	6	
(Antigua and Barbuda) Mikele Leigertwood	2021–2025	25	6	4	15	
(Mexico) Jacques Passy	2025-	8	3	1	4	

== Players ==
=== Current squad ===
The following players were called up for the 2025–26 CONCACAF Series matches against Aruba and Guyana on 12 and 18 November 2025.

Caps and goals are correct as of 12 November 2025, after the match against Aruba.

No.	Pos.	Player	Date of birth (age)	Caps	Goals	Club
1	GK	Jayden Martin	7 November 2002 (age 24)	1	0	(Antigua and Barbuda Football Association) All Saints United
18	GK	Zaieem Scott	10 July 2004 (age 22)	9	0	(The Football Association) Future Pro Academy
21	GK	Shahoi Dorsett	23 June 2004 (age 22)	2	0	(Royal Spanish Football Federation) CF Lorca Deportiva
2	DF	Zafique Drew	30 August 2003 (age 23)	13	0	(Antigua and Barbuda Football Association) All Saints United
5	DF	Kylano Isaac	January 10, 2005 (age 21)	3	0	(Polish Football Association) Chojniczanka Chojnice
6	DF	Tyrik Hughes	13 July 2005 (age 21)	9	0	(Royal Spanish Football Federation) CF Lorca Deportiva
13	DF	Amir Daley	February 26, 2002 (age 24)	3	0	(United States Soccer Federation) Birmingham Legion
14	DF	Jahzinho O'Garro	12 December 2002 (age 23)	4	0	(Antigua and Barbuda Football Association) All Saints United
17	DF	Leroy Graham	December 7, 1999 (age 26)	15	0	(Antigua and Barbuda Football Association) All Saints United
8	MF	Sean Tomlinson	25 March 2004 (age 22)	5	0	(Royal Spanish Football Federation) CF Lorca Deportiva
9	MF	Dion Pereira	25 March 1999 (age 27)	10	1	(The Football Association) Crawley Town
10	MF	TJ Bramble	9 May 2001 (age 25)	21	2	(The Football Association) Maidstone United
11	MF	Quinton Griffith	27 February 1992 (age 34)	89	11	(Antigua and Barbuda Football Association) Grenades
12	MF	Shalon Knight	4 March 2000 (age 26)	7	0	(Antigua and Barbuda Football Association) All Saints United
20	MF	Dannen Francis	14 December 2004 (age 21)	3	0	(Royal Spanish Football Federation) CD Almuñécar City
7	FW	Raheem Deterville	1 December 1999 (age 26)	22	2	(Antigua and Barbuda Football Association) All Saints United
15	FW	Daryl Massicot	12 February 2005 (age 21)	8	0	(Jamaica Football Federation) Cavalier
19	FW	D'Andre Bishop	2 October 2002 (age 24)	29	3	(Antigua and Barbuda Football Association) All Saints United
23	FW	Karique Knight	3 April 2005 (age 21)	2	0	(Antigua and Barbuda Football Association) All Saints United

=== Recent call-ups ===
The following players have also been called up to the Antigua and Barbuda squad within the last twelve months.

Pos.	Player	Date of birth (age)	Caps	Goals	Club	Latest call-up

== Player records ==
As of 6 October 2026
Players in bold are still active with Antigua and Barbuda.

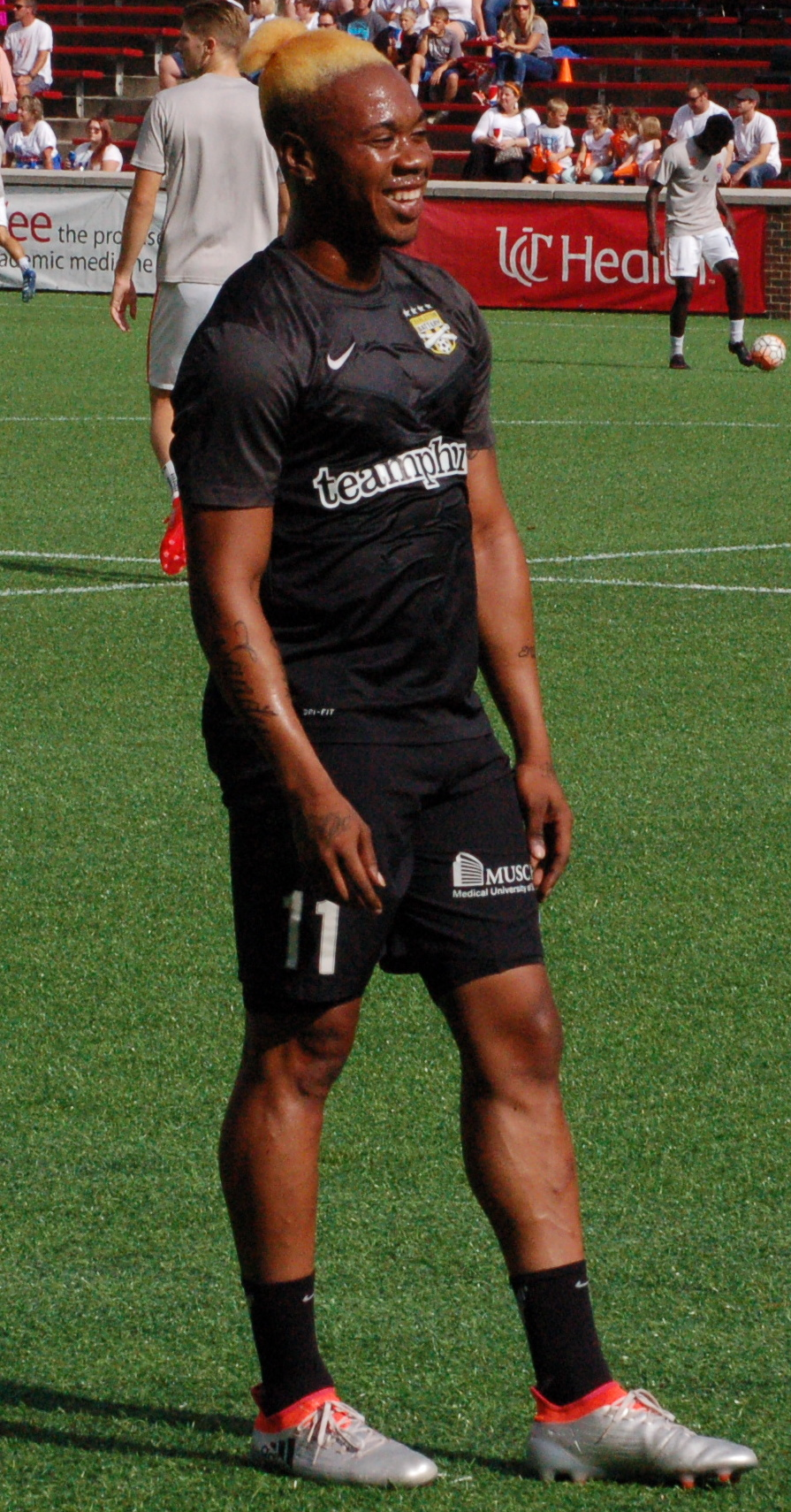
Quinton Griffith is Antigua and Barbuda's most capped player.

=== Most appearances ===
Rank	Player	Caps	Goals	Career
1	**Quinton Griffith**	93	11	2009–present
2	Peter Byers	91	44	2004–2021
3	George Dublin	67	4	2000–2012
4	Tamorley Thomas	64	12	2002–2021
5	Karanja Mack	58	0	2006–2022
6	Ranjae Christian	54	5	1998–2012
7	Randolph Burton	52	15	2008–2016
7	Akeem Thomas	52	2	2008–2018
9	Gayson Gregory	49	8	2000–2014
9	Molvin James	49	0	2007–2021

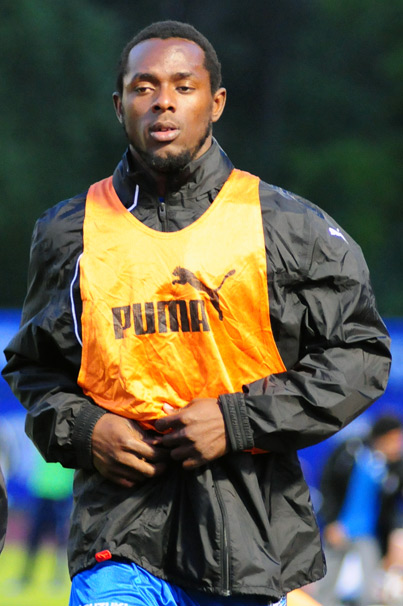
Peter Byers is Antigua and Barbuda's top goalscorer.

=== Top goalscorers ===
Rank	Player	Goals	Caps	Ratio	Career
1	Peter Byers	44	91	0.48	2004–2021
2	Derrick Edwards	18	22	0.82	1988–2000
3	Randolph Burton	15	52	0.29	2008–2016
4	Tamorley Thomas	12	64	0.19	2002–2021
5	**Quinton Griffith**	11	93	0.12	2009–present
6	Jamie Thomas	10	31	0.32	2006–2011
7	Myles Weston	9	16	0.56	2014–2023
8	Garfield Gonsalves	8	29	0.28	1992–2008
8	Kerry Skepple	8	34	0.24	2002–2012
8	Gayson Gregory	8	49	0.16	2000–2014

== Competitive record ==
=== FIFA World Cup ===
FIFA World Cup record										Qualification record					
Year	Round	Pos.	Pld	W	D	L	GF	GA	Squad	Pld	W	D	L	GF	GA
1930 to 1970	Not a FIFA member									Not a FIFA member					
(West Germany) 1974	Did not qualify									4	0	0	4	3	22
1978 and 1982	Did not participate									Did not participate					
(Mexico) 1986	Did not qualify									2	1	0	1	2	5
(Italy) 1990	Did not qualify									2	0	0	2	1	4
(United States) 1994	Did not qualify									4	1	1	2	5	6
(France) 1998	Did not qualify									2	0	1	1	4	6
(South Korea) (Japan) 2002	Did not qualify									6	1	2	3	4	15
(Germany) 2006	Did not qualify									2	1	0	1	2	3
(South Africa) 2010	Did not qualify									4	2	0	2	7	8
(Brazil) 2014	Did not qualify									12	5	1	6	32	18
(Russia) 2018	Did not qualify									4	2	0	2	6	6
(Qatar) 2022	Did not qualify									4	2	1	1	6	5
(Canada) (Mexico) (United States) 2026	Did not qualify									4	0	1	3	1	5
(Morocco) (Portugal) (Spain) 2030	To be determined									To be determined					
(Saudi Arabia) 2034	To be determined									To be determined					
Total	—	0/12	—							50	15	7	28	73	103

=== CONCACAF Gold Cup ===
CONCACAF Championship / Gold Cup record										Qualification record					
Year	Round	Pos.	Pld	W	D	L	GF	GA	Squad	Pld	W	D	L	GF	GA
1963 to 1971	Part of United Kingdom									Part of United Kingdom					
(Haiti) 1973	Did not qualify									4	0	0	4	3	22
1977 and 1981	Did not participate									Did not participate					
1985	Did not qualify									2	1	0	1	2	5
1989	Did not qualify									2	1	1	0	1	4
(United States) 1991	Did not participate									Did not participate					
(Mexico) (United States) 1993	Did not qualify									2	1	0	1	1	1
(United States) 1996	Did not qualify									3	1	2	2	6	11
(United States) 1998	Did not qualify									2	0	0	2	1	5
(United States) 2000	Did not qualify									11	4	2	5	24	17
(United States) 2002	Did not qualify									3	0	1	2	4	5
(Mexico) (United States) 2003	Did not qualify									5	0	1	4	1	8
(United States) 2005	Did not qualify									3	1	0	2	6	8
(United States) 2007	Did not qualify									6	2	0	4	8	17
(United States) 2009	Did not qualify									9	4	3	2	19	16
(United States) 2011	Did not qualify									6	2	2	2	4	5
(United States) 2013	Did not qualify									3	1	0	2	3	3
(Canada) (United States) 2015	Did not qualify									9	4	2	3	14	11
(United States) 2017	Did not qualify									6	3	0	3	10	8
(Costa Rica) (Jamaica) (United States) 2019	Did not qualify									4	2	0	2	10	8
(United States) 2021	Did not qualify									6	3	0	3	8	17
(Canada) (United States) 2023	Did not qualify									7	3	0	4	5	12
(Canada) (United States) 2025	Did not qualify									6	0	1	5	2	15
Total	—	0/20	—							99	33	15	51	132	198

=== CONCACAF Nations League ===
CONCACAF Nations League record
League phase											Final phase									
Season	League	Group	Pos.	Pld	W	D	L	GF	GA	P/R	Finals	Round	Pos.	Pld	W	D	L	GF	GA	Squad
2019−20	B	C	7th	6	3	0	3	8	17	Same position	(United States) 2021	Ineligible								
2022–23	B	A	8th	6	3	0	3	5	7	Same position	(United States) 2023	Ineligible								
2023–24	B	D	13th	6	1	1	4	9	22	Same position	(United States) 2024	Ineligible								
2024–25	B	D	15th	6	0	1	5	2	15	▼	(United States) 2025	Ineligible								
2026–27	C	B	3rd	4	3	0	1	11	3	▲	2027 (Note: Since the 2026–27 CONCACAF Nations League, a final phase has been held for each league.)	TBD								
Total				28	10	2	16	35	64	—	Total	—								

CONCACAF Nations League history
First match	Jamaica 6–0 Antigua and Barbuda (6 September 2019; Montego Bay, Jamaica)
Biggest win	Antigua and Barbuda 4–1 Bahamas (14 October 2023; Nassau, Bahamas)
Biggest defeat	Jamaica 6–0 Antigua and Barbuda (6 September 2019; Montego Bay, Jamaica); Guyana 6–0 Antigua and Barbuda (21 November 2023; Santo Domingo, Dominican Republic)
Best result	League B (2022–23); League C (2026–27)
Worst result	League B (2024–25)

=== Caribbean Cup ===
CFU Championship / Caribbean Cup record									Qualification record					
Year	Round	Pos.	Pld	W	D	L	GF	GA	Pld	W	D	L	GF	GA
(Trinidad and Tobago) 1978	Fourth place	4th	5	1	1	3	4	8	2	1	1	0	3	0
(Suriname) 1979	Did not qualify								2	0	0	2	0	2
(Puerto Rico) 1981	Did not participate								Did not participate					
(French Guiana) 1983	Fourth place	4th	7	2	2	3	11	10	4	2	2	0	10	5
(Barbados) 1985	Did not qualify								2	1	0	1	2	2
(Martinique) 1988	Runners-up	2nd	5	1	4	0	5	4	2	1	1	0	2	1
(Barbados) 1989	Did not qualify								4	3	0	1	4	2
(Trinidad and Tobago) 1990	Did not qualify								3	0	1	2	2	5
(Jamaica) 1991	Did not participate								Did not participate					
(Trinidad and Tobago) 1992	Group stage	7th	3	0	1	2	2	12	3	3	0	0	8	0
(Jamaica) 1993	Did not qualify								2	1	0	1	1	1
(Trinidad and Tobago) 1994	Did not qualify								2	1	0	1	10	3
(Cayman Islands) (Jamaica) 1995	Group stage	7th	3	1	0	2	3	8	2	0	2	0	3	3
(Trinidad and Tobago) 1996	Withdrew								Withdrew					
(Antigua and Barbuda) (Saint Kitts and Nevis) 1997	Group stage	6th	2	0	0	2	1	5	—	Qualified as hosts				
(Jamaica) (Trinidad and Tobago) 1998	Fourth place	4th	5	2	0	3	11	9	3	2	1	0	11	3
(Trinidad and Tobago) 1999	Did not qualify								3	0	1	2	2	5
(Trinidad and Tobago) 2001	Did not qualify								3	0	1	2	4	5
(Barbados) 2005	Did not qualify								3	1	0	2	6	8
(Trinidad and Tobago) 2007	Did not qualify								6	2	0	4	8	17
(Jamaica) 2008	Group stage	7th	3	0	2	1	3	6	6	4	1	1	16	10
(Martinique) 2010	Group stage	5th	3	1	0	2	2	4	3	1	2	0	2	1
(Antigua and Barbuda) 2012	Group stage	8th	3	1	0	2	3	3	Qualified as hosts					
(Jamaica) 2014	Group stage	7th	3	0	1	2	2	7	6	4	1	1	12	4
(Martinique) 2017	Did not qualify								6	3	0	3	10	8
Total	Runners-up	11/22	42	9	11	22	47	76	67	30	14	23	116	85

=== Central American and Caribbean Games ===
Central American and Caribbean Games record
Year	Round	Pos.	Pld	W	D	L	GF	GA
1930 to 1982	Did not participate							
(Dominican Republic) 1986	Quarter-finals	5th	2	0	1	1	1	2
Total	Quarter-finals	1/1	2	0	1	1	1	2

== Head-to-head record ==
The following table shows Antigua and Barbuda's all-time official international record per opponent:
Updated to 16 November 2026 after the match against Trinidad and Tobago

Key

Winning record Equal record Losing record

Opponent	Pld	W	D	L	GF	GA
Anguilla	7	7	0	0	36	3
Aruba	7	5	1	1	11	5
Bahamas	3	2	1	0	12	3
Barbados	8	1	1	6	9	16
Bermuda	14	3	5	6	14	18
British Virgin Islands	8	4	2	2	14	10
Cayman Islands	3	0	1	2	1	4
Cuba	8	0	1	7	4	19
Curaçao	4	3	0	1	10	6
Dominica	17	8	5	4	28	20
Dominican Republic	8	1	2	5	8	21
El Salvador	1	0	0	1	0	3
Estonia	1	0	0	1	0	1
French Guiana	1	1	0	0	2	1
Grenada	6	3	3	0	13	7
Guadeloupe	7	2	1	4	4	12
Guatemala	8	1	0	7	3	31
Guyana	15	5	3	7	17	37
Haiti	12	2	3	7	11	19
Honduras	2	0	0	2	0	3
Hungary	1	0	0	1	0	3
Jamaica	12	1	2	9	5	29
Martinique	4	1	0	3	6	12
Mexico	1	0	0	1	0	8
Montserrat	4	3	1	0	20	6
Puerto Rico	4	1	0	3	5	10
Saint Kitts and Nevis	23	9	5	9	30	31
Saint Lucia	14	5	3	6	23	18
Saint Vincent and the Grenadines	13	7	2	4	17	20
Sint Maarten	3	2	0	1	7	2
Suriname	6	1	2	3	4	15
Trinidad and Tobago	15	2	1	12	15	45
U.S. Virgin Islands	5	5	0	0	26	1
United States	2	0	0	2	2	5
Total	245	85	44	116	353	433

== Honours ==
=== Subcontinental / Regional ===
- CFU Championship
  - (silver) Runners-up (1): 1988

=== Friendly / Unofficial ===
- Leeward Islands Tournament (2): 1949, 1994
