= Football in Saint Barthélemy =

The sport of association football in the island of Saint Barthélemy is run by the Saint Barthélemy Football Association. The association administers the men's national football team, the women's national football team, the Saint-Barthelemy Championships, and the Trophée José da Silva. There are also veterans matches and youth involvement for both genders, though this appears to be limited to individual events. The sport is mostly restricted to the Stade de Saint-Jean, which is located in the capital Gustavia, a multi-purpose stadium constructed in the 1970s. As the pitch aged, it required renovation and Roman Abramovich provided £3m to this effect in 2010.

While the island was included as part of Guadeloupe up until 2007, the Saint-Barthelemy Championships started as early as 2004, with the most successful club being APSB. The championship has run annually since, though was not run in 2020/21 due to the pandemic. No corresponding women's league appears to yet be running, though APSB have fielded a women's side in friendlies against club opposition from Saint Martin and Sint Maarten. With the association not a member of CONCACAF, they are limited to friendlies, with the national side debuting as early as 2010 but the majority of their matches coming in locally held tournaments against the neighbouring islands in 2018 and 2019. The women's side has been extremely limited in scope, but did play against Sint Maarten women's national football team on 1 December 2019, defeating them 5–3.

== National football stadium ==
Stadium	Capacity	City
Stade de Saint-Jean	1,000	Saint-Jean
