= 2020 Saint-Barthelemy Championships =

Saint-Barthelemy Championships
- Season: 2020

The 2020 Saint Barthélemy Championships are the 17th season of the competition. Per obtained statistics, the competitions began sometime in early to mid 2020, and as of 17 November 2020, about 7 matches have been played. It is unclear how the COVID-19 pandemic affected the competition.

The competitions are broken into several mini cups and tournament. The only known competition that was played during the season was the 2020 edition of the Trophée José da Silva, or the Coupe de Noël.

== Clubs ==
Eight clubs participated in the season.

- Arawak
- Arawak Veterans
- ASPSB
- ASPSB Féminines
- ASPSB Veterans
- Diables Rouges
- Gustavia
- FWI

== Trophée José da Silva ==
=== Group stage ===
Pos	Team	Pld	W	D	L	GF	GA	GD	Pts	Qualification or relegation
1	Arawak (Q)	7	7	0	0	20	2	+18	21	Semifinals
2	Gustavia	6	3	2	1	22	12	+10	11	Semifinals
3	ASPSB	6	3	1	2	14	12	+2	10	Semifinals
4	Arawak Veterans	6	2	1	3	13	15	−2	7	Semifinals
5	FWI	5	2	0	3	4	10	−6	6	
6	ASPSB Veterans	6	2	0	4	7	14	−7	6	
7	Diables Rouges	5	1	2	2	8	8	0	5	
8	ASPSB Féminines (E)	5	0	0	5	0	15	−15	0	

Updated to match(es) played on 17 November 2020. Source: RSSSF
(E) Eliminated; (Q) Qualified for the phase indicated
