= List of football clubs in Saint Barthélemy =

This is a list of football (soccer) clubs in Saint Barthélemy.

- AJOE
- ASPSB
- FC Amicale (ex FC Beach-Hôtel)
- Arawak FC
- FC ASCCO
- FC Diables Rouges
- AS Gustavia
- FC Gustavia
- Young Stars
- Fc Ounalao
