= 2016–17 Saint-Barthelemy Championships =

The 2017 Saint Barthélemy Championship was the 14th season of the competition. The per obtained statistics, the season began on 30 September 2016 and ended on 7 April 2017. It is unknown what all the results were, but it was confirmed that ASPSB won the title, making it their first title in six years, and their record fifth-overall title.

== Standings ==
1. ASPSB
2. FC Gustavia
3. Diables Rouges
4. FC Arawak
5. AS Gustavia Féminine
6. Vétérans d'Arawak

=== Other competitions ===
ASPSB beat AS Gustavia 2–1 in the Taça Jose Veiga da Silva 2016 and the Coupe de Saint-Barth was abandon.
