= Jordan Johnson (footballer) =

British Virgin Islander footballer

Personal information
- Full name: Jordan Johnson
- Date of birth: 9 October 1986 (age 40)
- Place of birth: Stoke-on-Trent, England
- Height: 1.77 m (5 ft 10 in)
- Position: Forward

Senior career*
Years	Team	Apps	(Gls)
2006–2007	Leek Town		
2007–2008	Congleton Town		
2008–2011	Newcastle Town		
2011	AFC Telford United		
2012–2013	Airbus UK Broughton		
2013–2014	Leek Town		
2014	Airbus UK Broughton		
2015	Leek Town		
2015–2016	Kidsgrove Athletic		
2016–2019	Leek Town		
2020–2022	Congleton Town		

International career^{‡}
2015–2018	British Virgin Islands	7	(4)
- * Club domestic league appearances and goals ‡ National team caps and goals as of 25 July 2018

Jordan Johnson (born 9 October 1986) is a professional footballer who plays as a forward. Born in England, he represented the British Virgin Islands national football team.

== International career ==
=== International goals ===
Scores and results list British Virgin Islands' goal tally first.

Goal	Date	Venue	Opponent	Score	Result	Competition
1.	26 March 2015	Windsor Park, Roseau, Dominica	Dominica	2–1	2–3	2018 FIFA World Cup qualification
2.	25 July 2018	Raoul Illidge Sports Complex, Philipsburg, Sint Maarten	Sint Maarten	2–2	3–2	Friendly
3.	28 July 2018	Stade de Saint-Jean, Saint-Jean, Saint Barthélemy	Saint Barthélemy	1–1	4–3	Friendly
4.	28 July 2018	Stade de Saint-Jean, Saint-Jean, Saint Barthélemy	Saint Barthélemy	4–3‡	4–3	Friendly
