= Team FWI FC =

Teams FWI
- Full name: Team French West Indies FC
- Founded: 2018; 7 years ago
- Ground: Stade de Saint-Jean; Saint Barthélemy
- Capacity: 400
- League: Saint-Barthelemy Championships
- 2022: 2nd (Champions)
- Website: https://www.facebook.com/Team-FWI-Football-2297745733629993/

Team FWI FC is a Barthélemois association football club that competes in the Saint-Barthelemy Championships. The club won the league championship for the first time for the 2021 season. They won also the championship 2021-2022
