= Ouanalao FC =

Ouanalao
- Full name: Football Club Ouanalo
- Ground: Stade de Saint-Jean
- Capacity: ~1,000
- League: Saint-Barthelemy Championships
- 2014–15: 5th
- Website: http://fc-ouanalao.footeo.com/

Ouanalao FC is a Barthéloméen football club based in Anse du Grand Cul-de-Sac quartier. The club plays in the Saint-Barthelemy Championships, where they finished 5th during the 2014–15 season. That season they also won the Trophée José da Silva, the domestic cup on the island.

== Honors ==
- Trophée José da Silva: 2014–15
