= Saint Barthélemy national football team =

National association football team

Saint Barthélemy
- Association: Comité Territorial de Football de Saint-Barthélemy
- Head coach: Maxime Chevreul
- Most caps: Dora-Bruno Guimaraes (3)
- Top scorer: Anthony Maxor; Dora-Bruno Guimaraes; Melvin Ledee (2); Lima Stan
- Home stadium: Stade de Saint-Jean
- FIFA code: BLM
First colours	Second colours

First international
- Saint Martin 3–0 Saint Barthélemy (Quartier-d'Orleans, Saint-Martin; 3 July 2010)

Biggest win
- Saint Barthélemy 5–3 Sint Maarten (Saint-Jean, Saint Barthélemy; 26 May 2018)

Biggest defeat
- Saint Barthélemy 1–8 Guadeloupe (Saint-Jean, Saint Barthélemy; 8 September 2012)

The Saint Barthélemy national football team is the official association football team of Saint Barthélemy. The association is in the process of joining the Caribbean Football Union and CONCACAF and therefore cannot yet compete in tournaments sanctioned by these organizations.

== History ==
In 2010 Chelsea FC owner and Saint Barthélemy resident Roman Abramovich donated a reported $3 million to renovate the Stade de Saint-Jean. This allowed Saint Barthélemy to host home matches. In 2019 the Comité Territorial de Football de Saint-Barthélemy began the process of joining the Caribbean Football Union and CONCACAF for the first time.

This led to the start of the Saint Barthélemy team playing friendlies, though action was limited until they hosted friendly tournaments in 2018 and 2019. While competitive against their close neighbours, match time is still limited in comparison to members of CONCACAF. The women's team would also play in 2019, defeating Sint Maarten 5–3.

== List of international matches ==
The following list contains all results of Saint Barthélemy's matches.

3 July 2010 Friendly	Saint Martin	3–0	Saint Barthélemy	Quartier-d'Orleans, Saint Martin
		Report		Stadium: Stade Thelbert Carti

8 September 2012 Friendly	Saint Barthélemy	1–8	Guadeloupe	Saint-Jean, Saint Barthélemy
	???	Report	Michel Lafortune, Teddy Bacoul; Vladimir Pascal,, Dominique Mocka; Wilhem Severin	Stadium: Stade de Saint-Jean

29 April 2018 Friendly	Saint Barthélemy	3–2	Saint Martin	Saint-Jean, Saint Barthélemy
		Report		Stadium: Stade de Saint-Jean

26 May 2018 Friendly	Saint Barthélemy	5–3	Sint Maarten	Saint-Jean, Saint Barthélemy
		Report; Report	Jaeremi Drijvers,,	Stadium: Stade de Saint-Jean

27 July 2018 Friendly	Saint Barthélemy	1–2	Anguilla	Saint-Jean, Saint Barthélemy
	???	Report	Jonathan Guishard 45+3'; Kapil Battice 47'	Stadium: Stade de Saint-Jean

28 July 2018 Friendly	Saint Barthélemy	3–4	British Virgin Islands	Saint-Jean, Saint Barthélemy
	Dora-Bruno Guimaraes 5'; Marceau Magras 33'; Saint-Barth Johan 54'	Report	Jordan Johnson 29', 90+9' (pen.); Troy Caesar 50'; Kevin Fisher 57'	Stadium: Stade de Saint-Jean

23 February 2019 Friendly	Sint Maarten	1–1	Saint Barthélemy	Philipsburg, Sint Maarten
	Djai Essed 28'	Report; Report	Anthony Maxor 29'	Stadium: Raoul Illidge Sports Complex

17 March 2019 Friendly	Saint Barthélemy	4–3	Saint Martin	Saint-Jean, Saint Barthélemy
	Anthony Maxor 9'; Ze Gato 18'; Dora-Bruno Guimaraes 30'; Peter Beniseau 84'	Report; Report; Video	Natal Tasso 12' (pen.); Kearney Chance 47'; Akim Arrondell 78'	Stadium: Stade de Saint-Jean

4 March 2023 Friendly	Saint Barthélemy	5–1	Sint Maarten All Stars	Saint-Jean, Saint Barthélemy
19:00 UTC−4	Stan Lima ?'; Jean Cattiaux ?'; Melvin Ledee ?', ?'; Kevin Rigaud ?'			Stadium: Stade de Saint-Jean

10 March 2023 Friendly	Saint Martin	3–2	Saint Barthélemy	Quartier-d'Orleans, Saint Martin
19:30 UTC−4				Stadium: Stade Thelbert Carti

== Head-to-head record ==
Up to matches played on 10 March 2023.

Team	Pld	W	D	L	GF	GA	GD	WPCT
Anguilla	1	0	0	1	1	2	−1	0.00
British Virgin Islands	1	0	0	1	3	4	−1	0.00
Guadeloupe	1	0	0	1	1	8	−7	0.00
Saint Martin	4	2	0	2	9	11	−2	50.00
Sint Maarten	2	1	1	0	6	4	+2	50.00
Total	9	3	1	5	20	29	−9	33.33

Source: Results

== Managers ==
(Saint Barthélemy) Maxime Chevreul

== Player records ==
As of 17 March 2019

Players in bold are still active with Saint Barthélemy.

Most appearances
Rank	Name	Caps	Goals	Career
1	Dora-Bruno Guimaraes	3	2	2018–2019
2	Anthony Maxor	2	2	2019
2	Peter Beniseau	2	1	2019

Top goalscorers
Rank	Name	Goals	Caps	Ratio	Career
1	Anthony Maxor	2	2	1	2019
1	Dora-Bruno Guimaraes	2	3	0.67	2018–2019
3	Peter Beniseau	1	2	0.5	2019
3	Saint-Barth Johan	1	–	–	2018–2019
3	Marceau Magras	1	–	–	2018–2019
3	Ze Gato	1	–	–	2019

== Historical kits ==
**2010**	**2018 Home**	**2023 Away**
