= 2016 Saint-Barthelemy Championships =

The 2016 Saint Barthélemy Championship was the 13th season of the competition. The championship was won by FC Gustavia.
