= Gustavia Lighthouse =

Lighthouse on Saint Barthélemy in the French West Indies

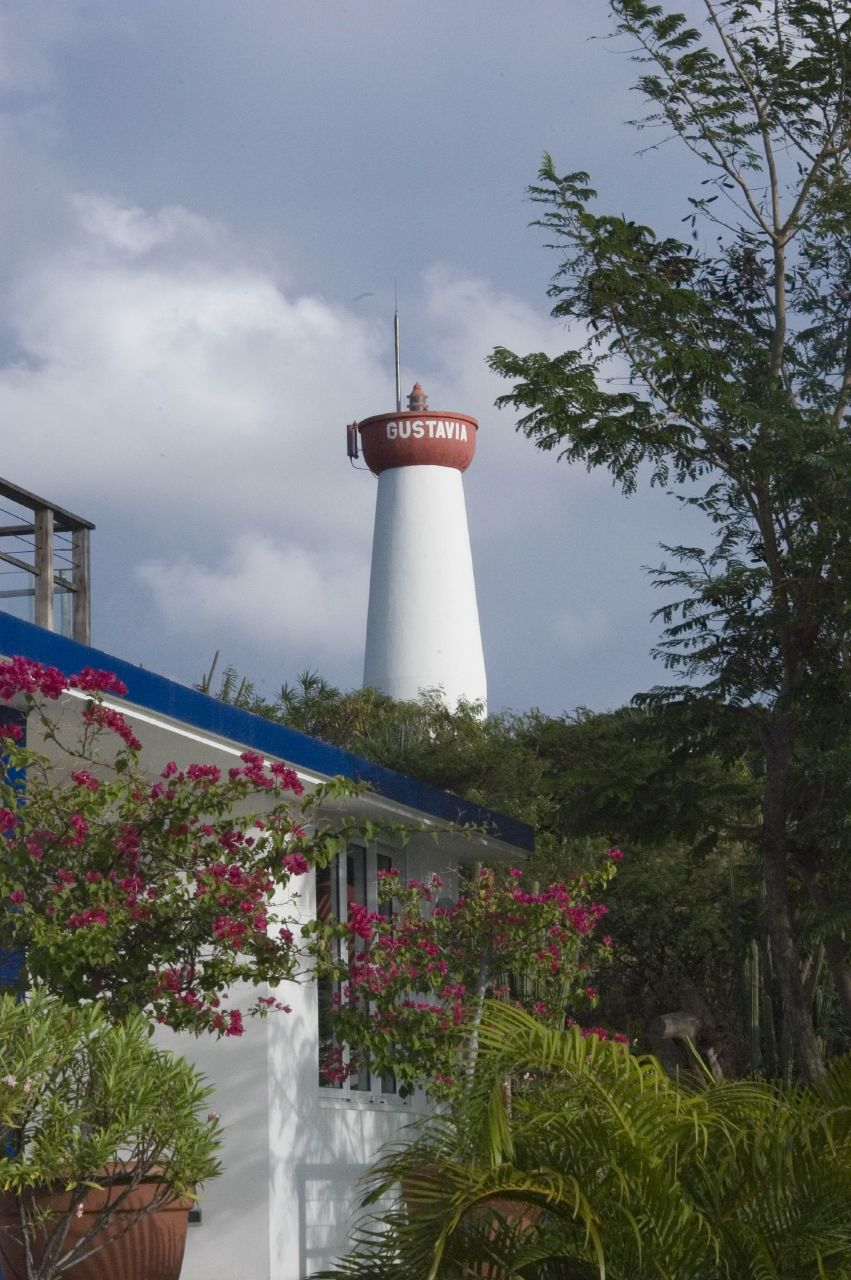
- View of Gustavia Lighthouse
- Location: Gustavia, Saint Barthélemy, France
- Coordinates: 17.901061°N 62.851533°W

Tower
- Constructed: 1961
- Construction: concrete (tower)
- Automated: 1972
- Height: 9 metres (30 feet)
- Shape: conical
- Markings: white (body), red (dome)
- Power source: mains electricity

Light
- First lit: 1962
- Focal height: 64 metres (210 feet)
- Light source: electricity
- Range: 11 km (6.8 mi) (white), 8 km (5.0 mi) (red), 8 km (5.0 mi) (green)
- Characteristic: white, green, red / 12 s

The Gustavia Lighthouse is a 20th-century lighthouse located in Gustavia, the capital of Saint Barthélemy in the French West Indies. It was constructed in 1961 on the grounds of Fort Gustav, overlooking the Gustavia harbor.

Today the lighthouse is a popular location for tourists, hikers, and photographers, as well as a site for viewing regattas, such as the St Barths Bucket Regatta.

== History ==
The lighthouse was constructed in 1961 by the Direction des Phares and Balises. It was built on the grounds of Fort Gustav, one of multiple 18th-century forts that protected Gustavia. Construction took six months, and was done by two laborers: Joseph Gréaux de Flamands and Louis Turbé de Public.

The lighthouse's lamp was first lit in 1962, by lighthouse keeper Albert Lédée (who would be lighthouse keeper for almost 30 years). Originally, the lamp was gas powered. It required three cylinders each month, which were replaced by Lédée monthly.

In 1972, after switching to electricity, the operation of the lighthouse lamp was automated. An electronic cell triggers the lamp's mechanism based on brightness. Additionally, batteries were installed at the bottom of the tower to provide back-up power to the light in the event of power loss from a hurricane.

== Characteristics ==
The lighthouse is 9 metres (30 feet) tall. Its focal plane is 64 meters (210 feet) above sea level. The round conical tower has a single red band at the top, with "Gustavia" written in white. Its light flashes every 12 seconds, white, green, or red depending on direction, with a range of 8–11 km (5.0–6.8 mi). Some have noted that the Gustavia Lighthouse does not meet the French Bureau of Lighthouses and Signals criteria for lighthouse height or range.

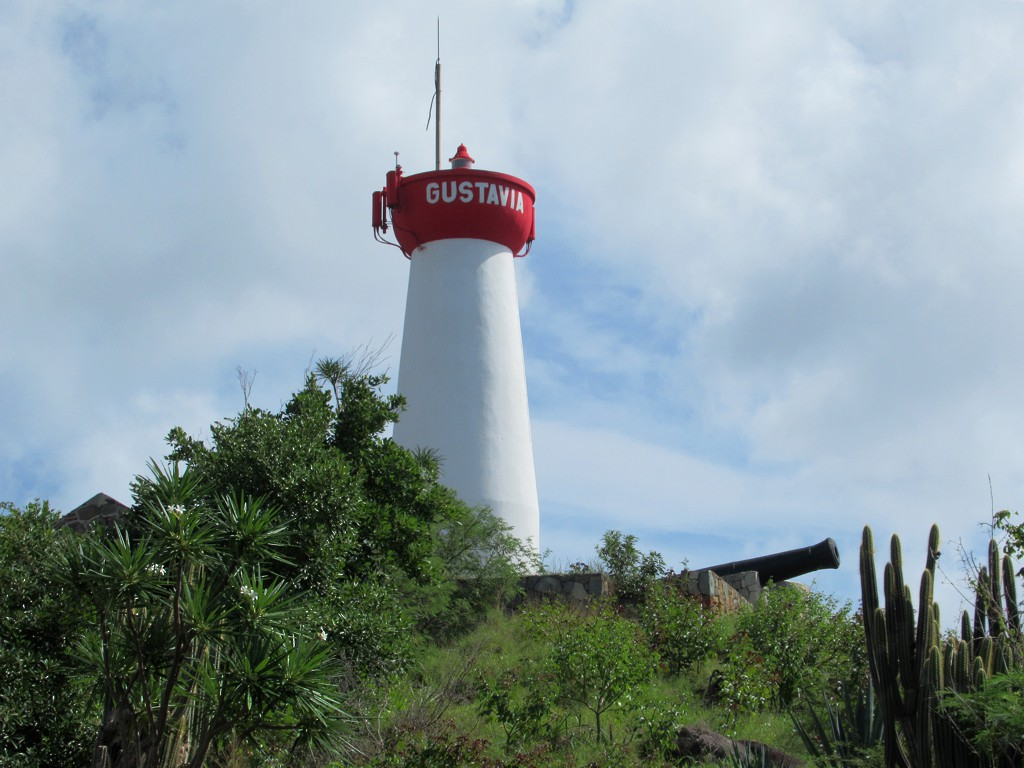
Gustavia Lighthouse with canon below

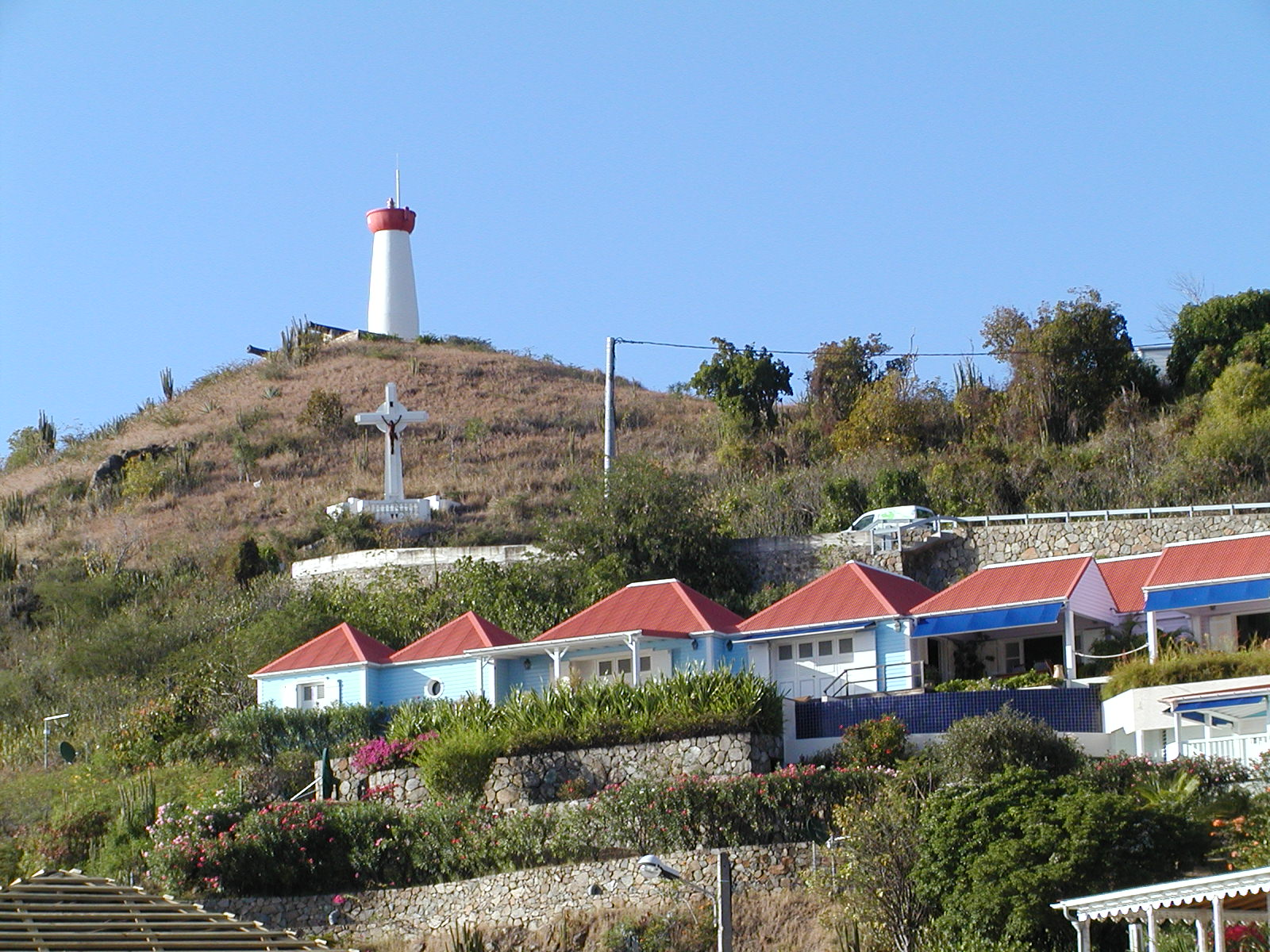
Gustavia Lighthouse and canons on hill above Gustavia Harbor

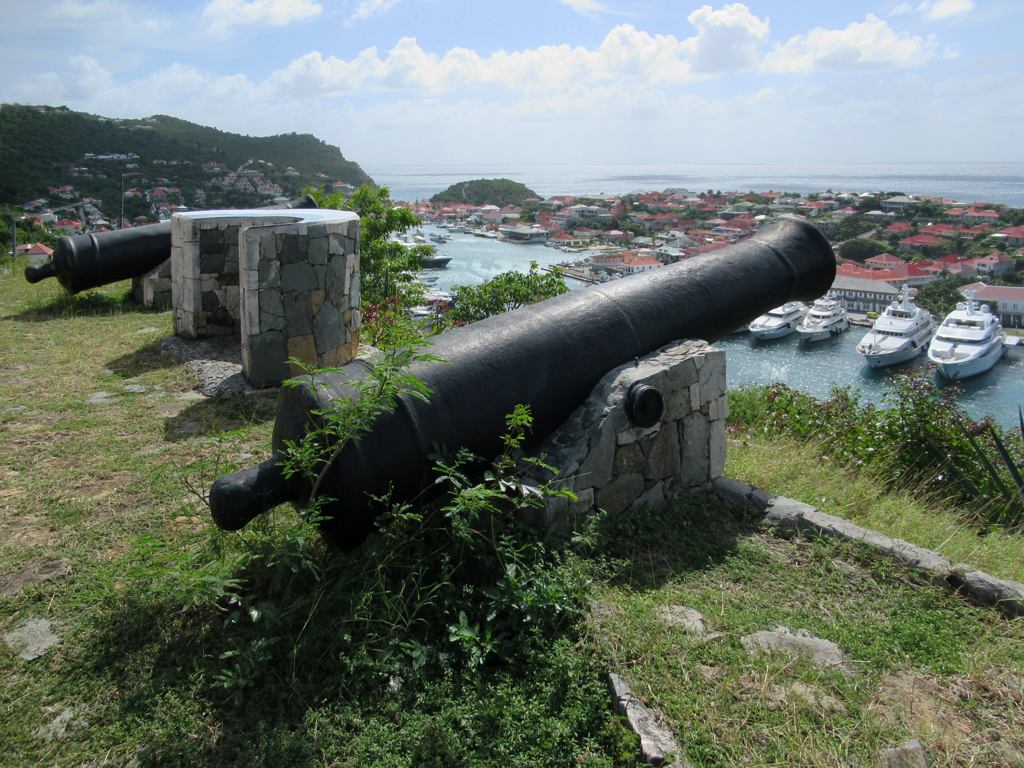
View of Gustavia harbor from the base of Gustavia Lighthouse

== See also ==
- List of lighthouses in France
- List of lighthouses in Saint Barthélemy
- Bureau Phares et Balises(Bureau of Lighthouses and Signals)
