= Fort Oscar =

18th Century fort in Saint Barthélemy

- Gustavia, Saint Barthélemy
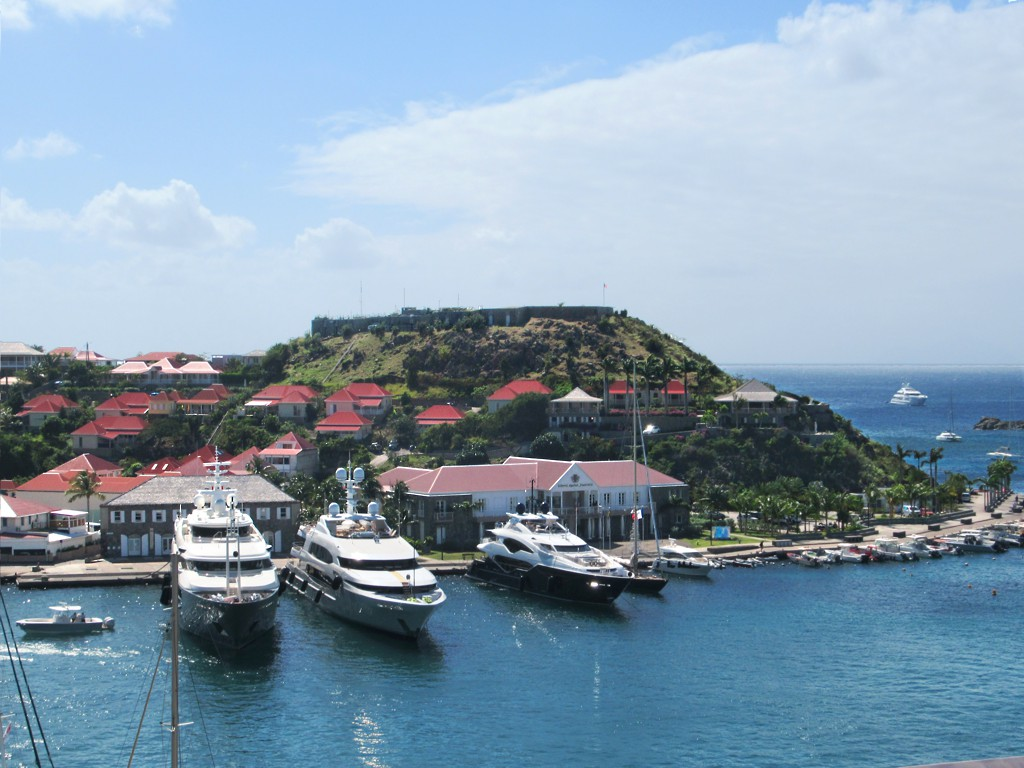
- Fort Oscar on hilltop above Gustavia harbor

Site information
- Type: Fortification
- Owner: France
- Open to the public: No

Location
- Coordinates: 17.89728°N 62.85356°W

Site history
- Built: 1789
- In use: National Gendarmerie

Fort Oscar (previously Gustav Adolf) is an 18th century military fort in Gustavia, the capital of Saint Barthélemy. It sits at an elevation of 136 feet, overlooking the Gustavia harbor. The fort was built during Sweden's rule of Saint Barthélemy. It was one of the three forts surrounding Gustavia, with Fort Gustav and Fort Karl. It was armed with four canons.

Today, Fort Oscar houses the local Gendarmerie. The fort is often a site for viewing regattas, such as Les Voiles de Saint-Barth and the St Barths Bucket Regatta. Fireworks are featured over Fort Oscar on special occasions such as New Year's Eve.
