= Fort Karl =

- Gustavia, Saint Barthélemy
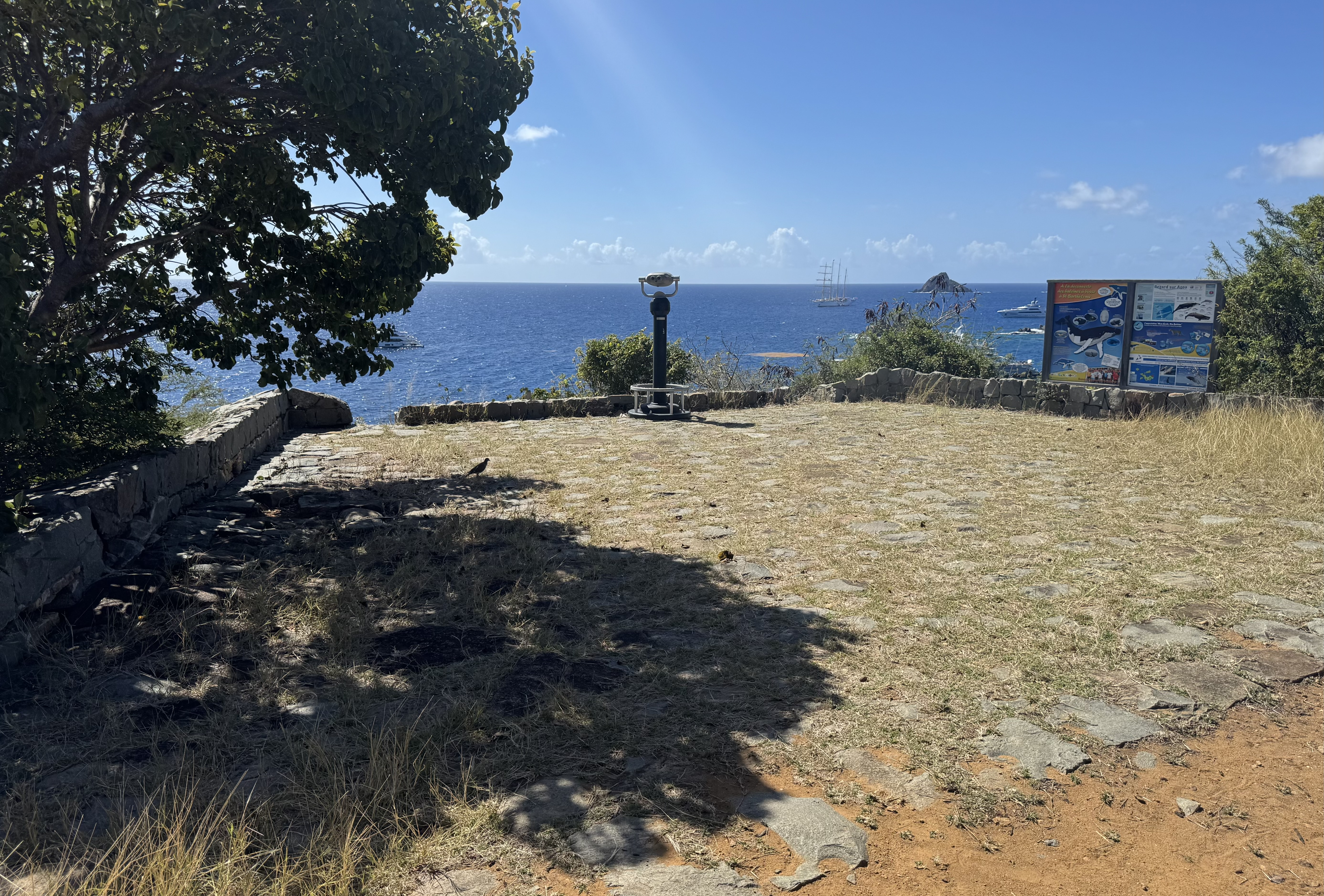

Site information
- Type: Fortification
- Owner: Conservatoire du littoral
- Open to the public: Yes
- Condition: Ruins

Location
- Location within Saint Barthélemy Location within the Caribbean
- Coordinates: 17.8952725°N 62.84781309°W

Site history
- Built: 1789

Fort Karl is a historic military fort located in Gustavia, the capital of Saint Barthélemy. It was built by the Swedish in 1789 and was named for Karl XIII. Today, the location of the fort's remains is a protected site, managed by the Conservatoire du littoral.

== Location ==
The site of Fort Karl is located in southwest Gustavia, on small hill approximately 34 meters (111ft) high. The site overlooks Gustavia and its port (to the northeast) and Shell Beach (to the southeast). The surrounding islands of Saint Kitts & Nevis, Saba, Sint Eustatius, and Saint Martin are visible from the fort's location.

== History ==
Fort Karl was built in 1789 during the era of Swedish rule of Saint Barthélemy, which lasted until 1878. It was built to protect Gustavia's harbor and valuable salt industry against attacks from the south, and was strategically significant due to the island's position. It was one of the three forts surrounding Gustavia during the Swedish era, along with Fort Gustav and Fort Oscar. Fort Karl was named for Karl XIII, the brother of Swedish King Gustav III. By the late 19th century, the remains of the fort had fallen into ruins.

== The fort today ==
Only ruins remain at the site of Fort Karl. The site is accessible to the public via a stone staircase. In 2007, the Conservatoire du Littoral took possession of the Fort Karl site, and they have since restored some of the remains of the fort. Preservation is managed locally by the Saint-Barthélemy Nature Reserve. The Fort Karl site is a popular location for hiking and whale watching, due to the panoramic views offered by the site's position.

== Gallery ==
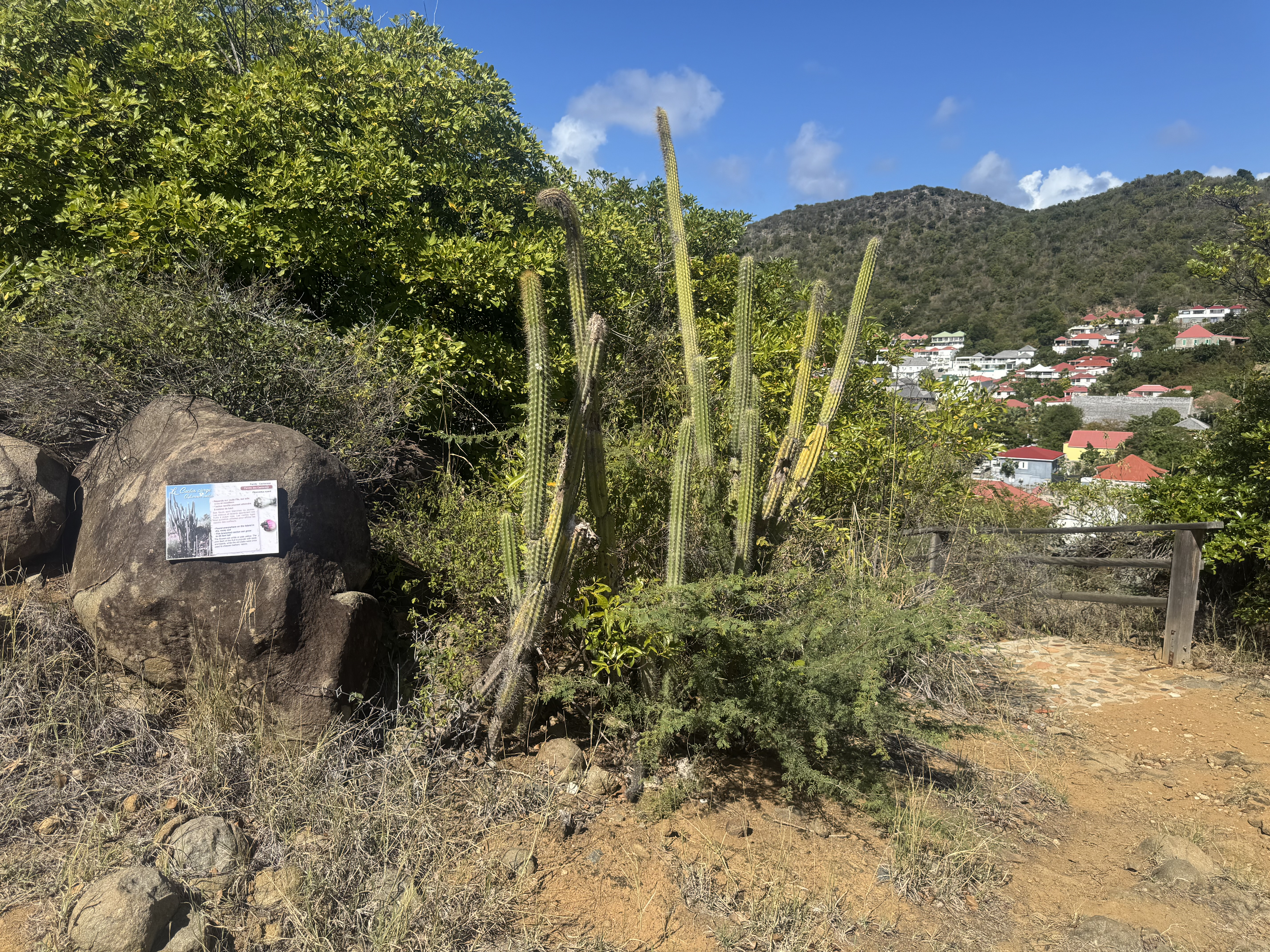
Top of stairway leading to Fort Karl

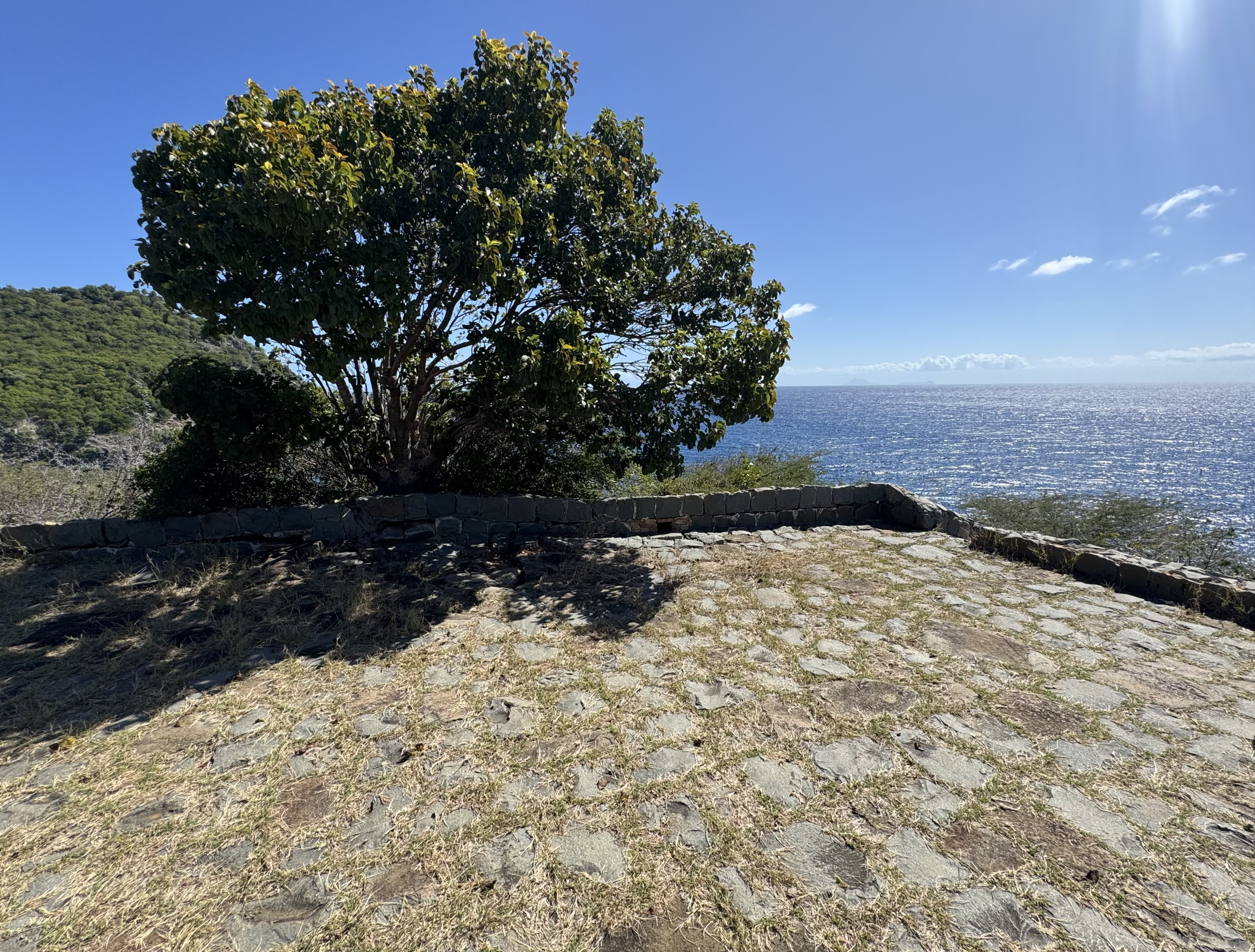
Fort Karl's former artillery platform, overlooking Caribbean Sea

Grounds of Fort Karl, with Gustavia in the background

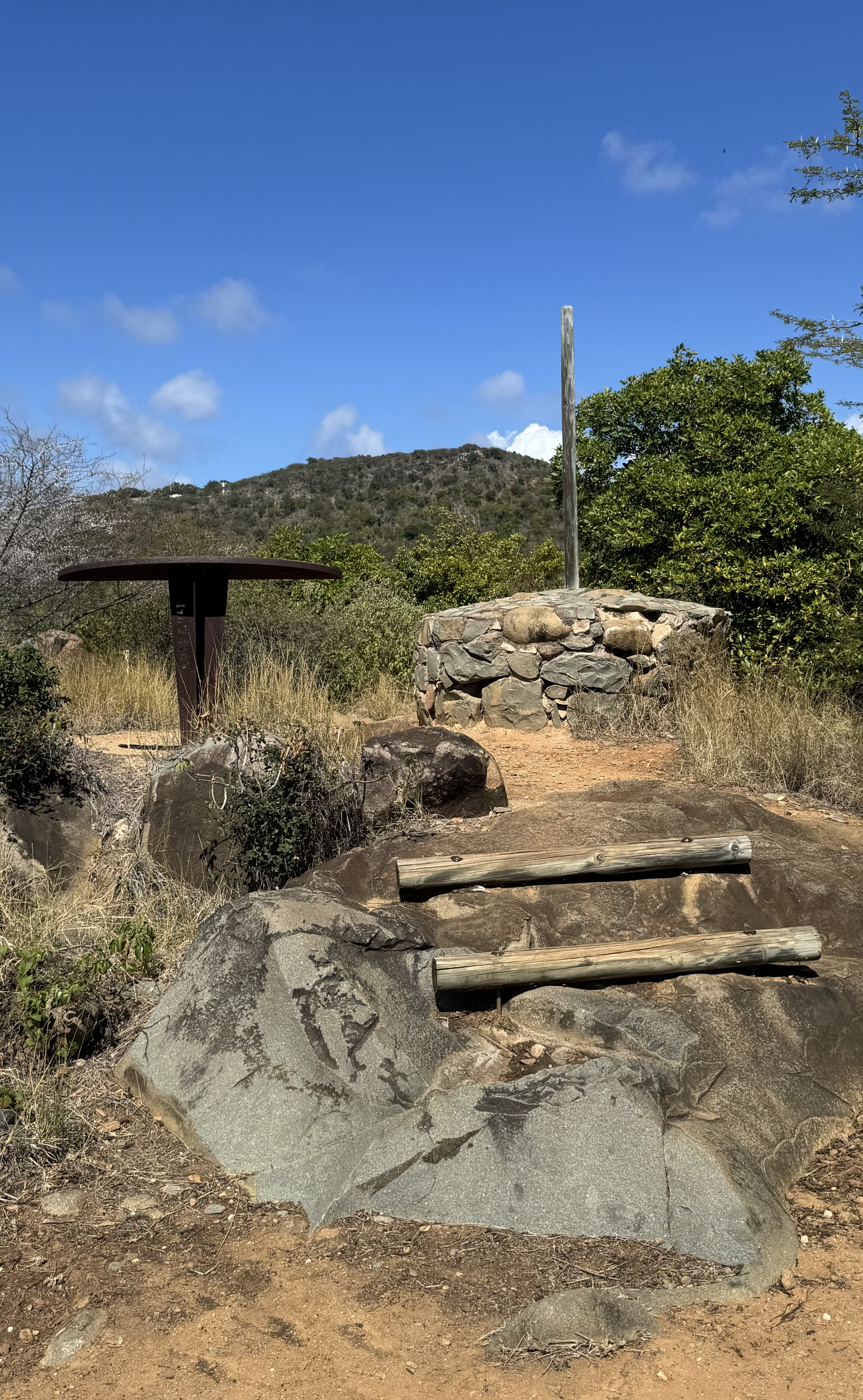
Informational podium (left) and location of former flagpole (right)
