= Church of Our Lady of the Assumption, Gustavia =

Church in Gustavia, France

Coordinates: 17.8947°N 62.8483°W

Church of Our Lady of the Assumption
- L'église Notre-Dame de l'Assomption
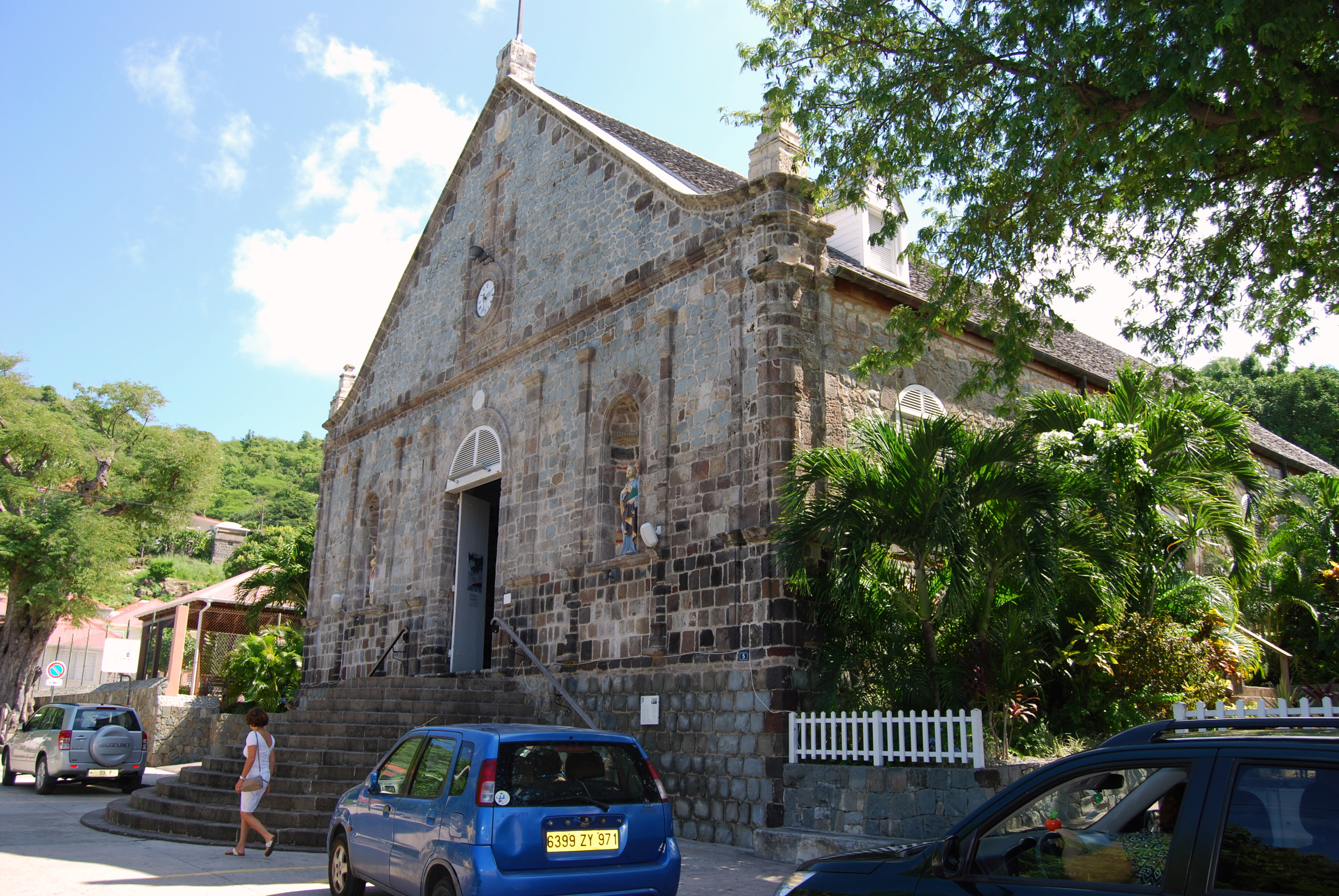
- Church of Our Lady of the Assumption, Gustavia
- Church of Our Lady of the Assumption
- Location: Gustavia
- Country: Saint Barthélemy, France
- Denomination: Roman Catholic Church

The Church of Our Lady of the Assumption (French: L'église Notre-Dame de l'Assomption) or the Catholic Church of Gustavia (Église catholique de Gustavia) is a religious building dating from the nineteenth century and is located in the town of Gustavia on the island of Saint Barthelemy, a dependency of France in the Caribbean Sea. The bell tower, the square and other structures are protected with the title of Historic Monuments.

The Church of Our Lady of the Assumption was finished in 1829. It was severely damaged by a cyclone of August 2, 1837 and not reopened until 1842.

The style used is Spanish influence. The main facade has a single arched opening. On either side of the entrance is a small niche with a statue of a saint. The interior is sober. The floor is partially marble. The roof structure is hidden by a false wooden ceiling. Two small windows provide ventilation and light of the church.

On the other side of the street it is also a funeral chapel built in honor of Sister Armelle, who died in 1947 and a roundabout for the Sacred Heart (rotonde pour le Sacré-Cœur), in honor of the sailors of St. Bartholomew.

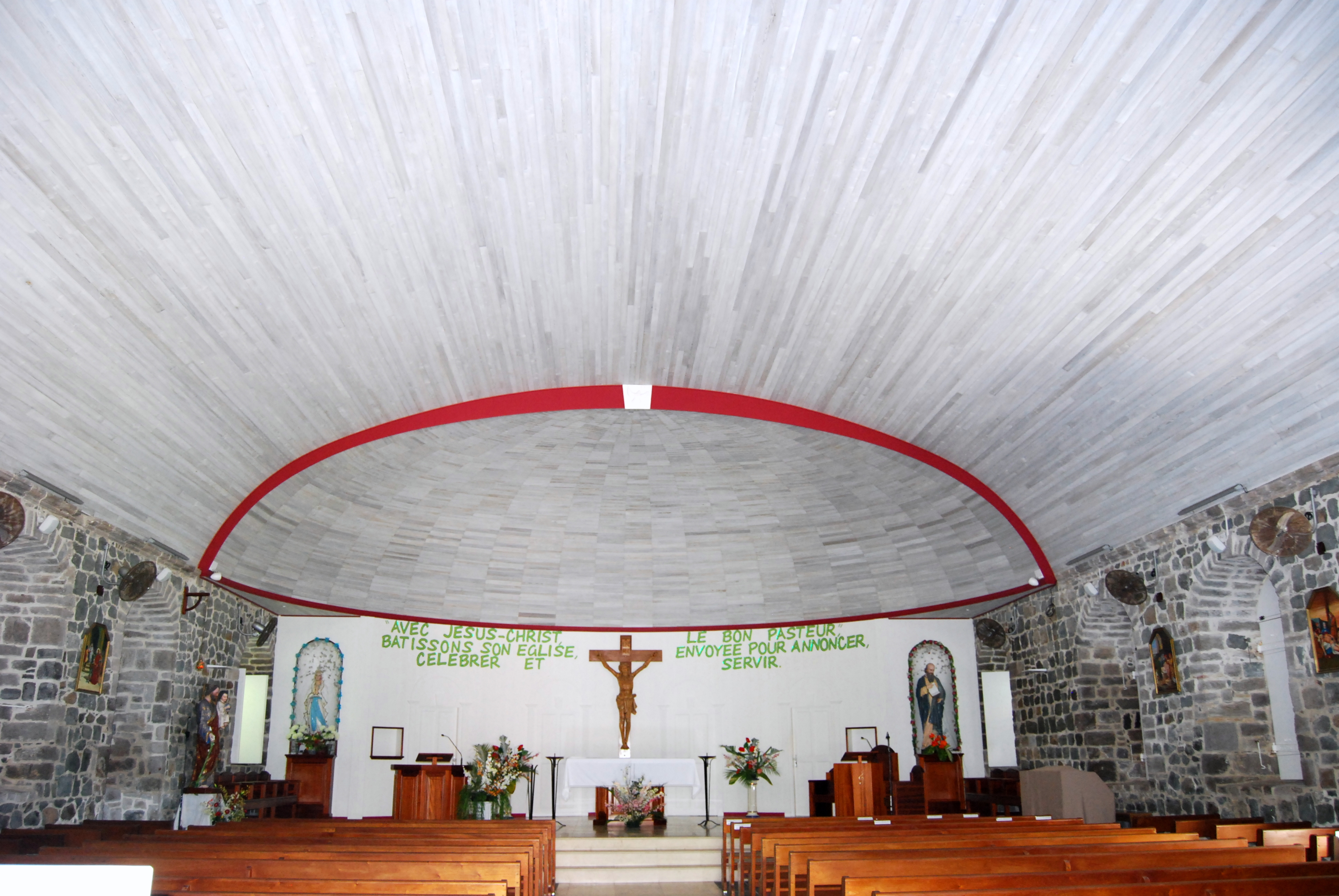
Internal view

== See also ==
- Roman Catholicism in France
- Our Lady of the Assumption
