= Comité Territorial de Football de Saint-Barthélemy =

Governing body of association football in Saint Barthélemy

CONCACAF
- Founded: 1994
- FIFA affiliation: N/A
- CONCACAF affiliation: N/A
- President: Zouhir Boubakeur
- Website: Official website

The Comité Territorial de Football de Saint-Barthélemy (English: Territorial Football Committee of Saint-Barthélemy) is the governing body of association football in Saint Barthélemy. The association was founded in 1994. In 2019 the committee announced that it was seeking membership in CONCACAF and the Caribbean Football Union for the first time. As of the September 2019 elections, the president of the association is Zouhir Boubakeur and the vice-president is French footballing legend Robert Pires.

Unlike other overseas collectivities which are affiliated with the French Football Federation (FFF), the Comité Territorial de Football de Saint-Barthélemy was aligned with the Football League of Guadeloupe, an Overseas Collectivity from which Saint Barthélemy voted to secede and form a separate Collectivity in 2003. However, the CTFSB separated from the Guadeloupean association as a required step in becoming a member of the Caribbean Football Union and CONCACAF. They have since been receiving support from the FFF.

== League ==
The committee organizes the Saint-Barthelemy Championships.

== National team ==
The Saint Barthélemy national football team is also organized by the committee.

== See also ==
- Football Committee of Saint-Martin
- Guadeloupean League of Football
