= FC Diables Rouges =

Diables Rouges
- Full name: Football Club Diables Rouges
- Ground: Stade de Saint-Jean
- Capacity: ~1,000
- League: Saint-Barthelemy Championships
- 2014–15: 3rd

FC Diables Rouges (English: Red Devils) is a Barthéloméen football club. The club plays in the Saint-Barthelemy Championships, where they finished third during the 2014–15 season.
