= Swedish battery of Fort Gustav III =

- Gustavia, Saint Barthélemy
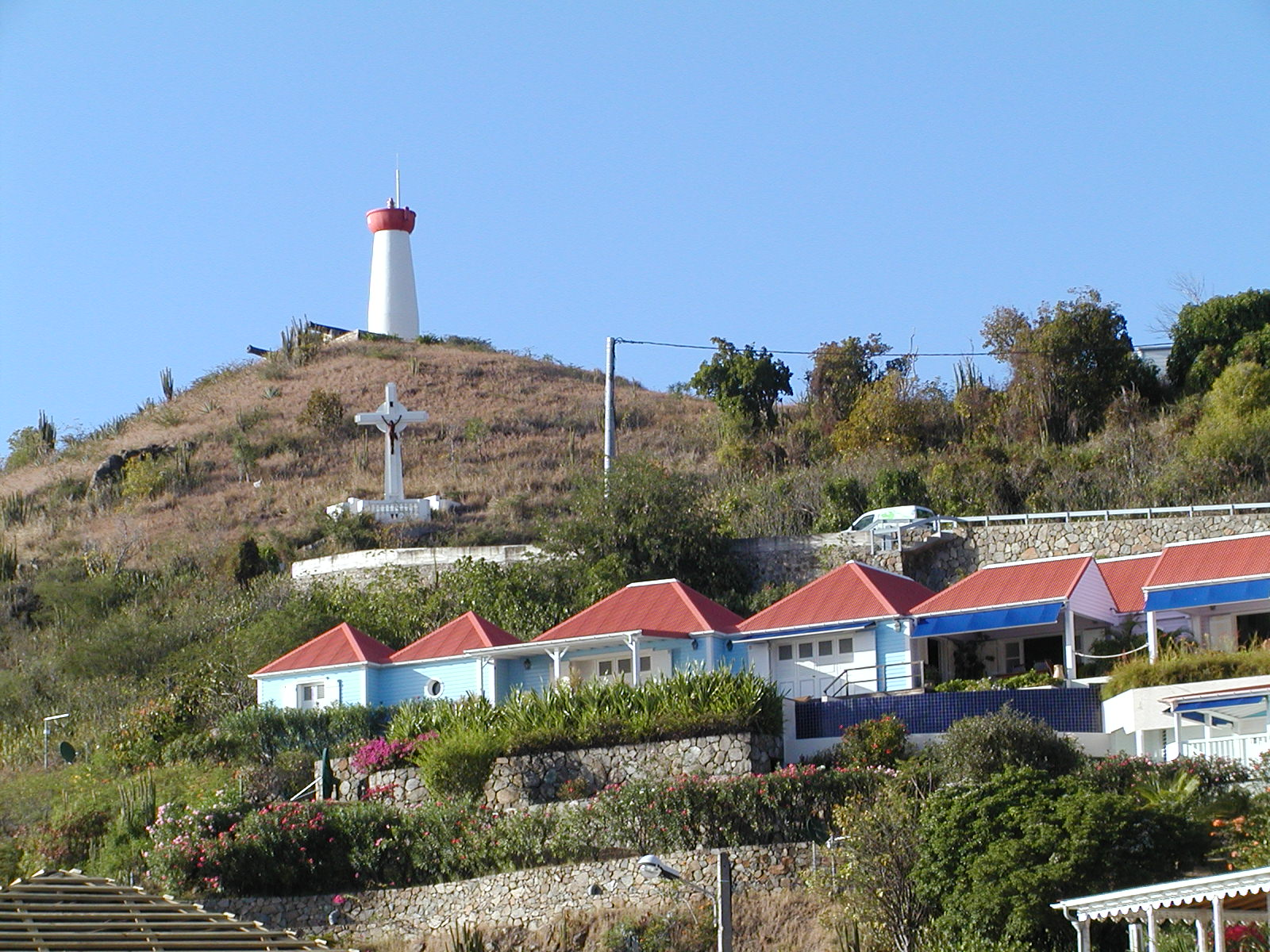
- Hill with Gustavia Lighthouse and two canons, which was the location of Fort Gustav

Site information
- Type: Fortification
- Owner: France
- Open to the public: Yes
- Condition: Ruins

Location
- Coordinates: 17.896700°N 62.824700°W

Site history
- Built: 1787
- Materials: Stone

The Swedish battery of Fort Gustav III (French: Batterie suédoise du fort Gustav III) (also Fort Gustav or Fort Gustave) is a historic military battery built in 1787. It is located in Gustavia on the island of Saint Barthélemy, a dependency of France in the Caribbean. The remains of Fort Gustav are registered on the French national list of historic monuments.

== History of Fort Gustav ==
Fort Gustav was the most important fortification in Gustavia during the era of Sweden's rule of Saint Barthélemy. It was one of three forts surrounding Gustavia during the Swedish era, along with Fort Karl and Fort Oscar. It was built between 1786 and 1787, on the grounds of previous fortifications built by the French in the late 17th century. It comprised a stone guardhouse, stone ramparts, a cistern, a powder house, two sentry boxes, a bakery, and wooden barracks for 12 men. Towards the end of the Swedish period, the battery fell into ruin. The only remains of Fort Gustav are portions of the enclosure, guardhouse, cistern, powder house, and kitchen.

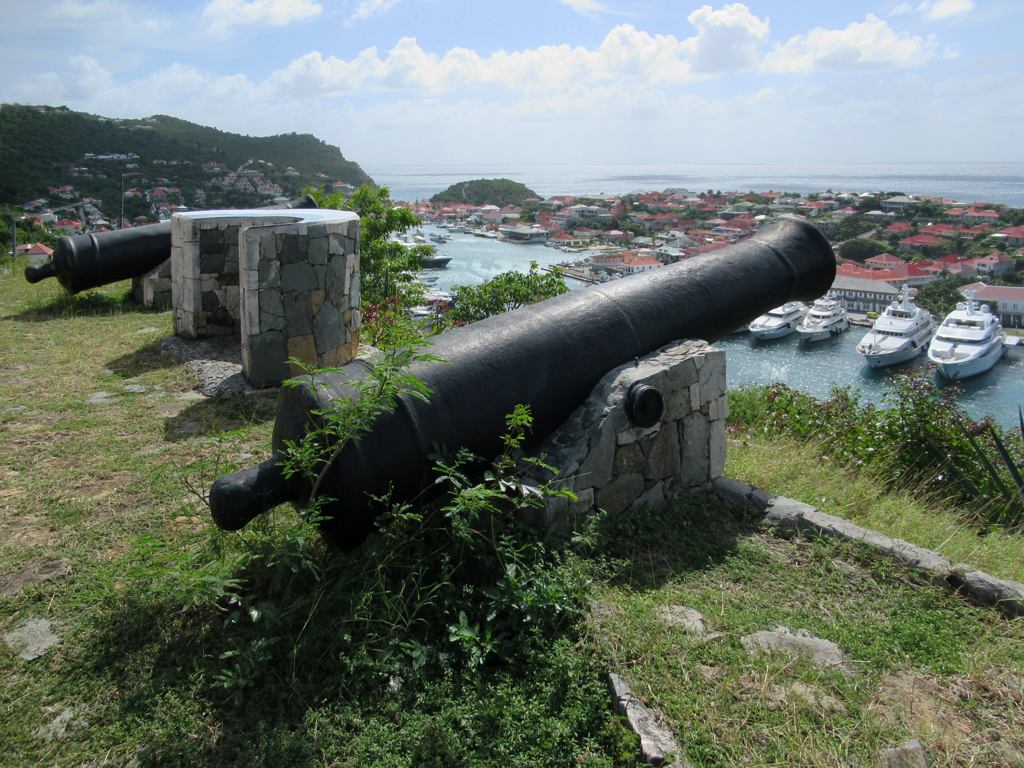
Canons on the grounds of Fort Gustav

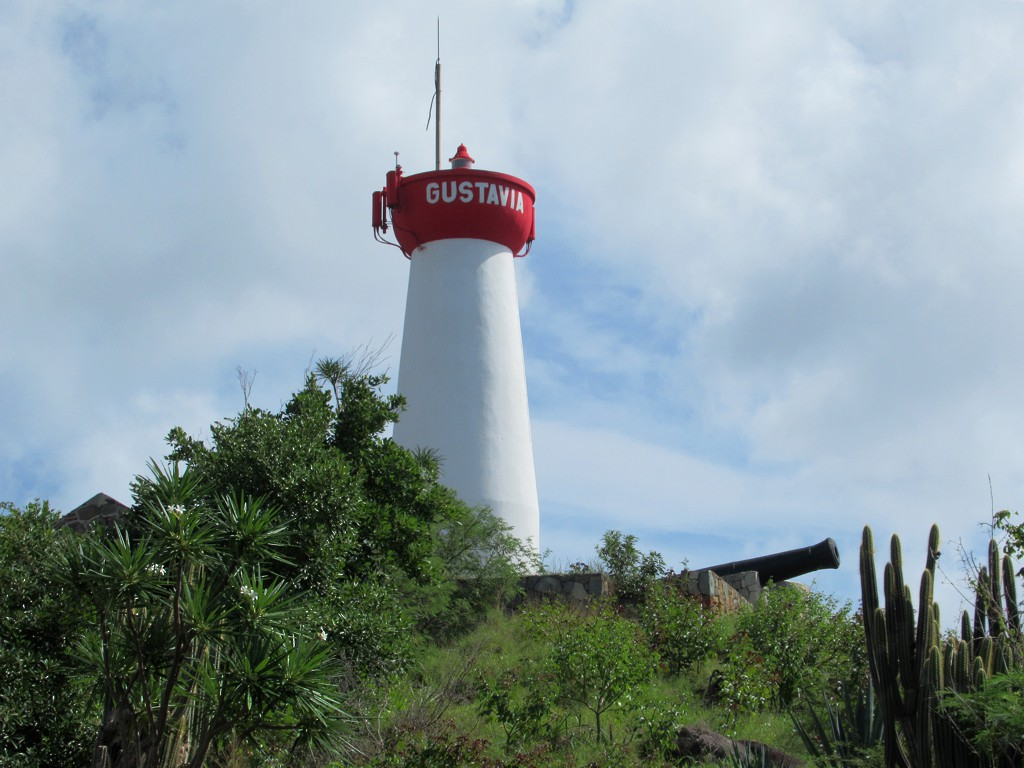
Gustavia Lighthouse, located on the grounds of Fort Gustav

== Site today ==
In 1952, the Météo France weather station was built on the grounds of Fort Gustav. In 1961, the Gustavia Lighthouse was built on the grounds. In 1995, the remains of Fort Gustav were registered on the French national list of historic monuments. In 2004, the weather station was renamed Espace Météo Caraïbes and provided a meteorological museum space. In 2017, two period canons were added to the grounds of Fort Gustav, loaned by the Swedish Navy Museum. Archeological studies of the fort's remains were done in 2020 and 2023.

== See also ==
- Saint Barthélemy
- Gustavia
