= List of lighthouses in Saint Barthélemy =

This is a list of lighthouses in Saint Barthélemy.

== Lighthouses ==
Name	Image	Year built	Location & coordinates	Class of light	Height tower	NGA number	Admiralty number	Range nml
Gustavia Lighthouse		1961	Gustavia; 17°54′03.8″N 62°51′05.0″W	Fl (3) WRG 12s.	10 metres (33 ft)	14736	J5664	white: 11 red: 8 green: 8

== See also ==
- Lists of lighthouses and lightvessels
