= Sint Maarten women's national football team =

Sint Maarten
- Association: Sint Maarten Football Federation
- Confederation: CONCACAF (North America)
- Sub-confederation: CFU (Caribbean)
- FIFA code: SXM; SMA (CONCACAF Code)
First colours	Second colours	Third colours

FIFA ranking
- Current: NR (7 October 2026)

First international
- Saint Barthélemy 5–3 Sint Maarten (Saint-Jean, Saint Barthélemy; 1 December 2019)

Biggest win
- Saint Barthélemy 1–4 Sint Maarten (Saint-Jean, Saint Barthélemy; 28 January 2023)

Biggest defeat
- Anguilla 7–0 Sint Maarten (The Valley, Anguilla; 28 July 2023)

The Sint Maarten women's national football (Dutch: Sint Maartens vrouwenvoetbalelftal) represents Sint Maarten, the Dutch half of the Caribbean island of Saint Martin, in international football, and is controlled by the Sint Maarten Football Federation. Sint Maarten is not a member of FIFA, and therefore not eligible to enter the FIFA Women's World Cup or any competition organized first-hand by the organization. However, the association is a member of CONCACAF.

== History ==
The Sint Maarten Soccer Association arranged two friendly matches against Anguilla in 2022. Sint Maarten's team experienced defeat in both meetings against the Anguillan side. They played Anguilla again in July 2023, along with Saint Kitts and Nevis.

In April 2023, the under-20 was the first women's side from Sint Maarten to participate in a CONCACAF tournament; by participating in the 2023 CONCACAF Women's U-20 Championship qualification.

Sint Maarten who had initially entered the 2024 CONCACAF W Gold Cup qualification and were placed in League C, Group B, alongside Saint Lucia, Cuba and Guadeloupe. However, they later withdrew from the qualifying tournament.

== Results and fixtures ==
The following is a full list of the team's match results, as well as any future matches that have been scheduled.

Legend

Win Draw Lose Fixture

== Competitive record ==
=== CONCACAF W Gold Cup ===
CONCACAF W Gold Cup record								Qualification record							
Year	Result	GP	W	D*	L	GF	GA	Division	Group	GP	W	D*	L	GF	GA
(United States) 2024	Withdrew							Withdrew							
(N/A) 2029	To be determined							To be determined							
Total	–	–	–	–	–	–	–	–	–	–	–	–	–	–	–

*Draws include knockout matches decided on penalty kicks.
