= Arawak FC =

Arawak
- Full name: Arawak Football Club
- Ground: Stade de Saint-Jean
- Capacity: ~1,000
- League: Saint-Barthelemy Championships
- 2014–15: 2nd
- Website: http://fcarawak.puzl.com/

Arawak FC is a Barthéloméen football club. The club plays in the Saint-Barthelemy Championships, where they finished 2nd during the 2014–15 season.
