= ASPSB =

The Portuguese Sports Association of Saint-Barthelemy (French: Association Sportive Portugaise de Saint-Barthelemy) (shortened to ASPSB) is a multi-sport Barthélemois club located in Gustavia, Saint Barthélemy. The club is best known for their football program, which competes in the Saint-Barthelemy Championships, the top-tier of football on the island. With five titles, they are the most successful Barthelemois club in the competition's history.

ASPSB is the most recent recipient of the league title, winning the competition in 2024.

== Teams ==
=== Senior team ===
ASPSB's main men's team.

=== Veteran team ===
Over 30 team.

=== Feminine team ===
Women's team.

== Honours ==
- Saint-Barthelemy Championships:
  - Winners (5): 2007–08, 2008–09, 2009–10, 2010–11, 2016–17
- Taça Jose Veiga da Silva
  - Winners (1): 2016
