= St Barths Bucket Regatta =

Annual boat race in Saint Barthélemy

The St Barths Bucket Regatta is an annual boat race, held over three days in Saint Barthélemy, in the Caribbean. It is usually held in the month of March. The first regatta in St Barths itself was held in 1995 with four yachts; Sariyah, Gleam, Mandalay and Parlay. Ten years later, 26 boats competed in the race. To apply to race, yachtsmen must receive an invitation and enters boats 100 feet and up. In the 2008 regatta, boats including the 125 ft Altair, the 115-ft Tenacious, the 148-ft Helios and the 152-ft Windrose (the winner).
