= Saint-Barthelemy Championships =

Saint Barthélemy Championship
- Founded: 2003; 23 years ago
- First season: 2003
- Country: Saint Barthélemy
- Confederation: CONCACAF
- Number of clubs: 4 (2024)
- Level on pyramid: 1
- Domestic cup: Coupe de St.-Barth
- Current champions: ASPSB (2024)
- Most championships: ASPSB (7 titles)

The Saint-Barthélemy Championship (French: Ligue de Saint-Barthélemy) is the top division of association football in the Saint Barthélemy. The most successful club is ASPSB.

The territory of Saint Barthélemy consists of Saint Barthelemy and the near islands.

== Champions per year ==
Season	Champion
2003/04	FC Gustavia
2004/05	FC Beach-Hôtel
2005/06	FC Beach-Hôtel
2006/07	FC Amicale
2007/08	ASPSB
2008/09	ASPSB
2009/10	ASPSB
2010/11	ASPSB
2011/12	FC Amicale
2012/13	Ouanalao FC
2013/14	Ouanalao FC
2014/15	AS Gustavia
2015/16	AS Gustavia
2016/17	ASPSB
2017/18	FC Arawak
2018/19	ASPSB
2020	Cancelled
2021	Team FWI
2022	Team FWI
2023	FC Arawak
2024	ASPSB
2025	FC Arawak

== Titles by club ==
Club	Titles	Seasons won
ASPSB	7	2007/08, 2008/09, 2009/10, 2010/11, 2016/17, 2018/19, 2024
FC Amicale (includes FC Beach-Hôtel)	4	2004/05, 2005/06, 2006/07, 2011/12
Arawak	3	2017/18, 2023, 2025
AS Gustavia	2	2014/15, 2015/16
Team FWI	2	2021, 2022
Ouanalao FC	2	2012/13, 2013/14
FC Gustavia	1	2003/04

== See also ==
- Saint-Martin Championships
