= Gustavia =

Capital city of Saint Barthélemy, France

- Capital city
- City of Gustavia
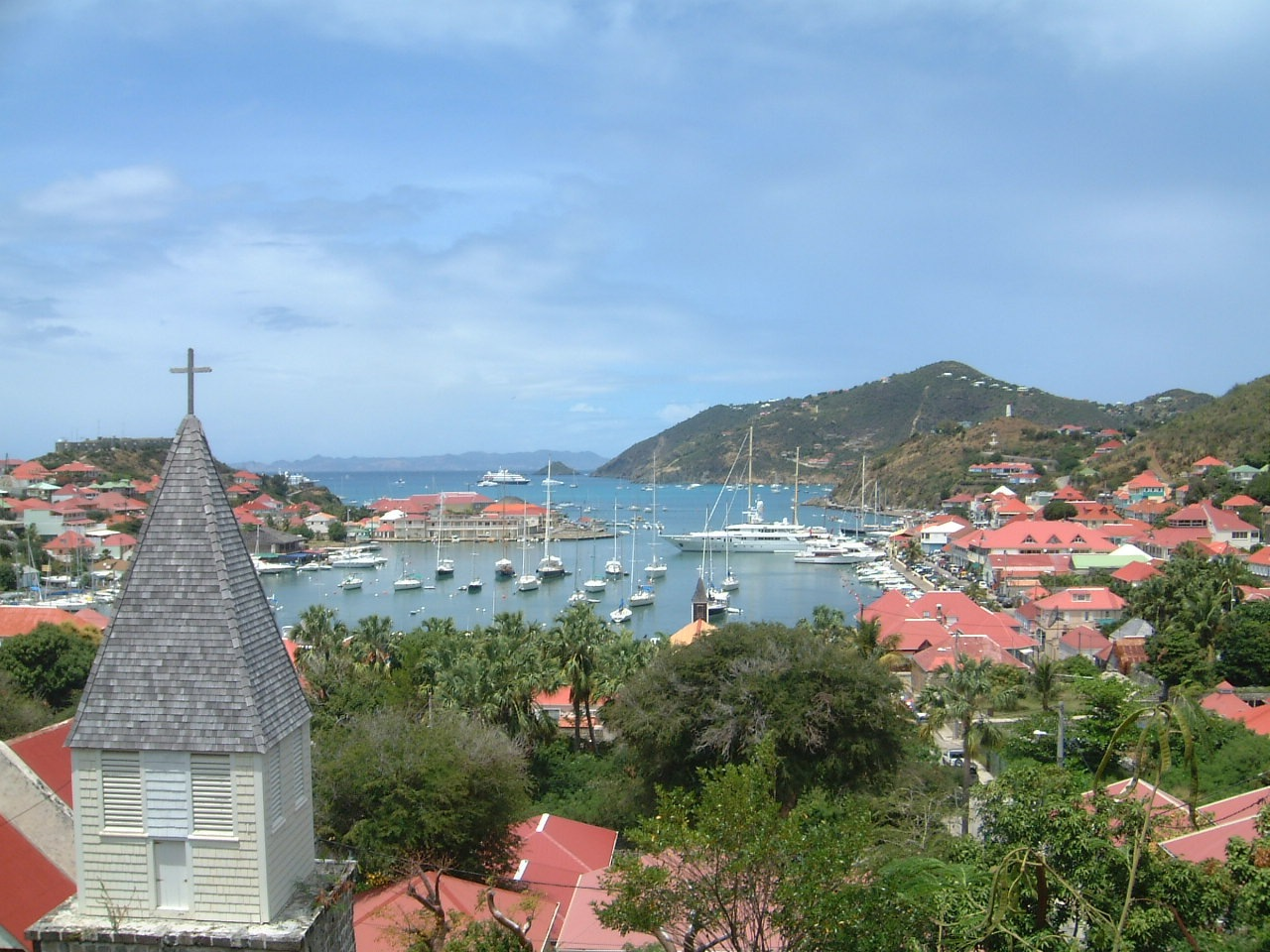
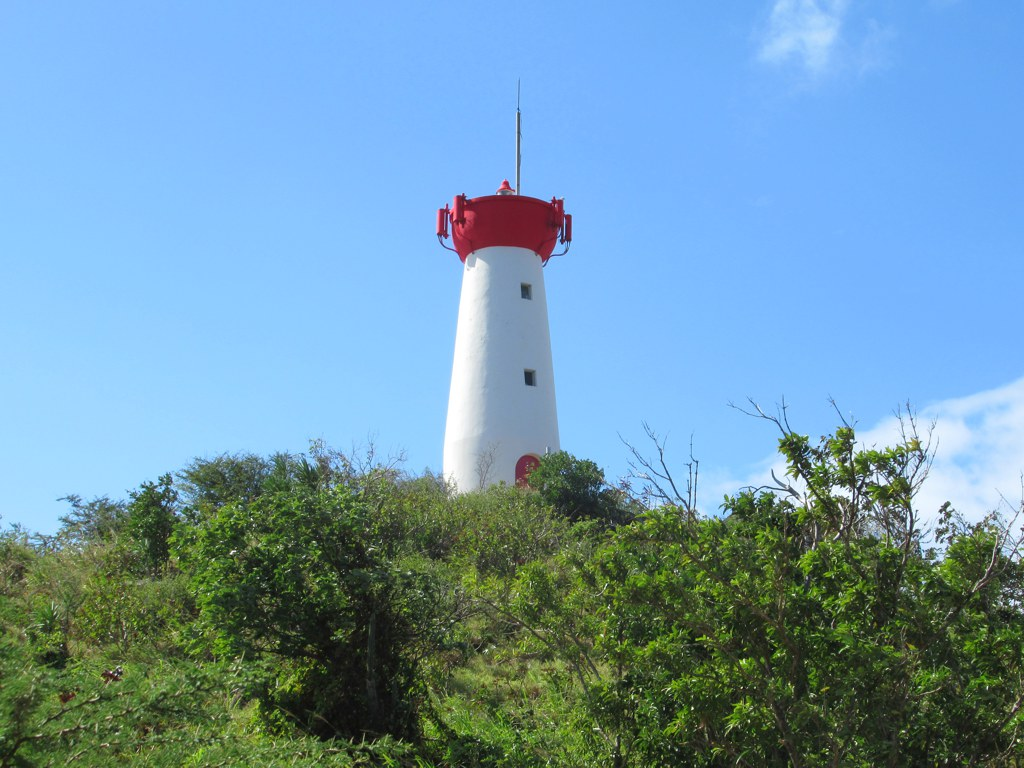
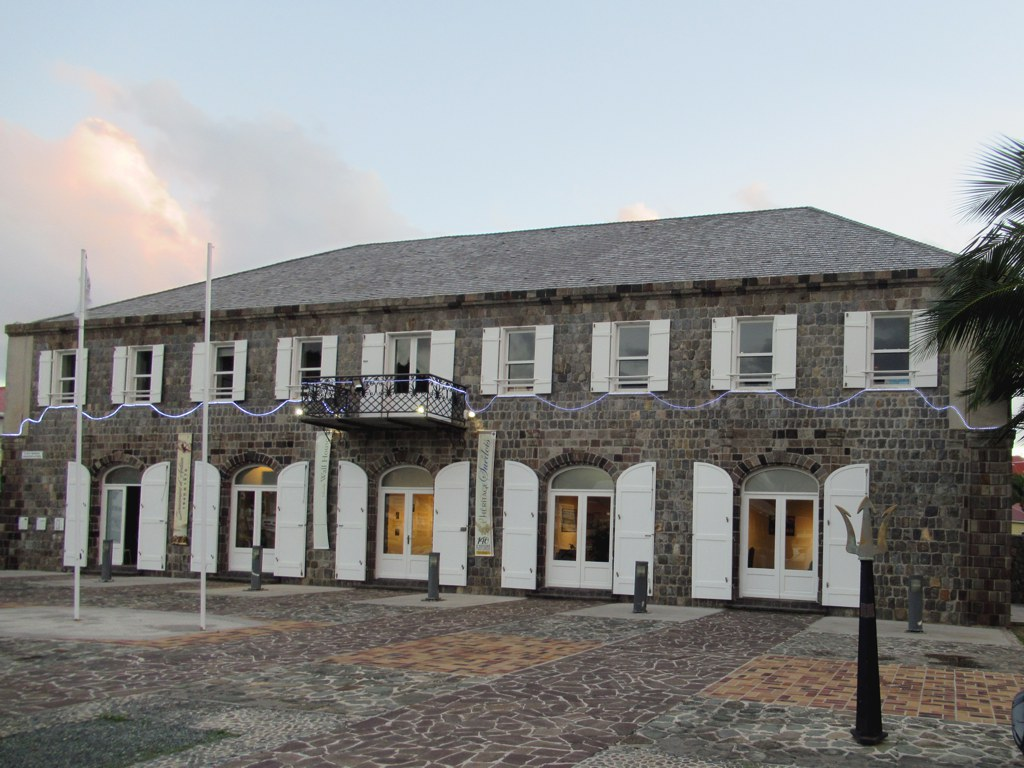
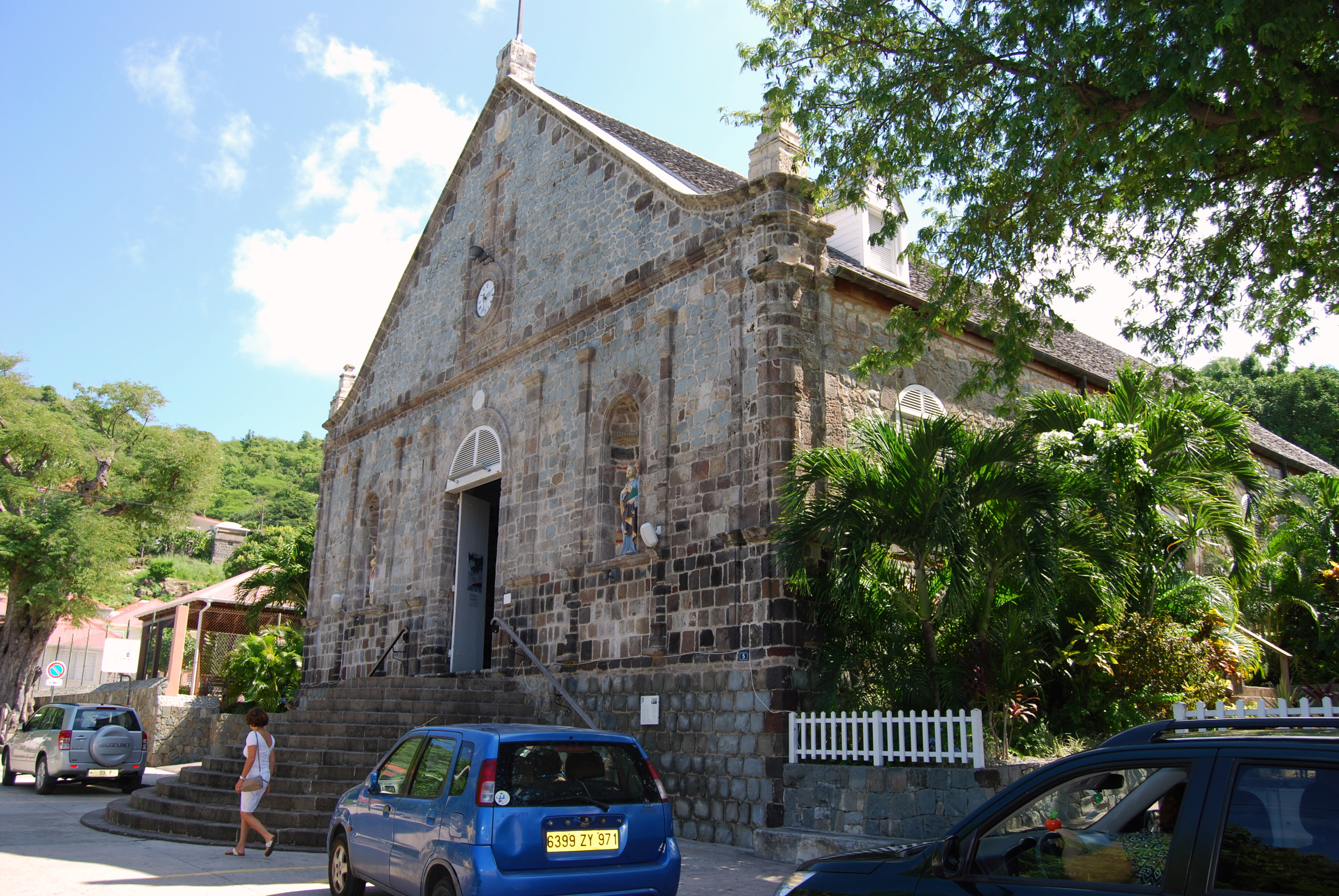
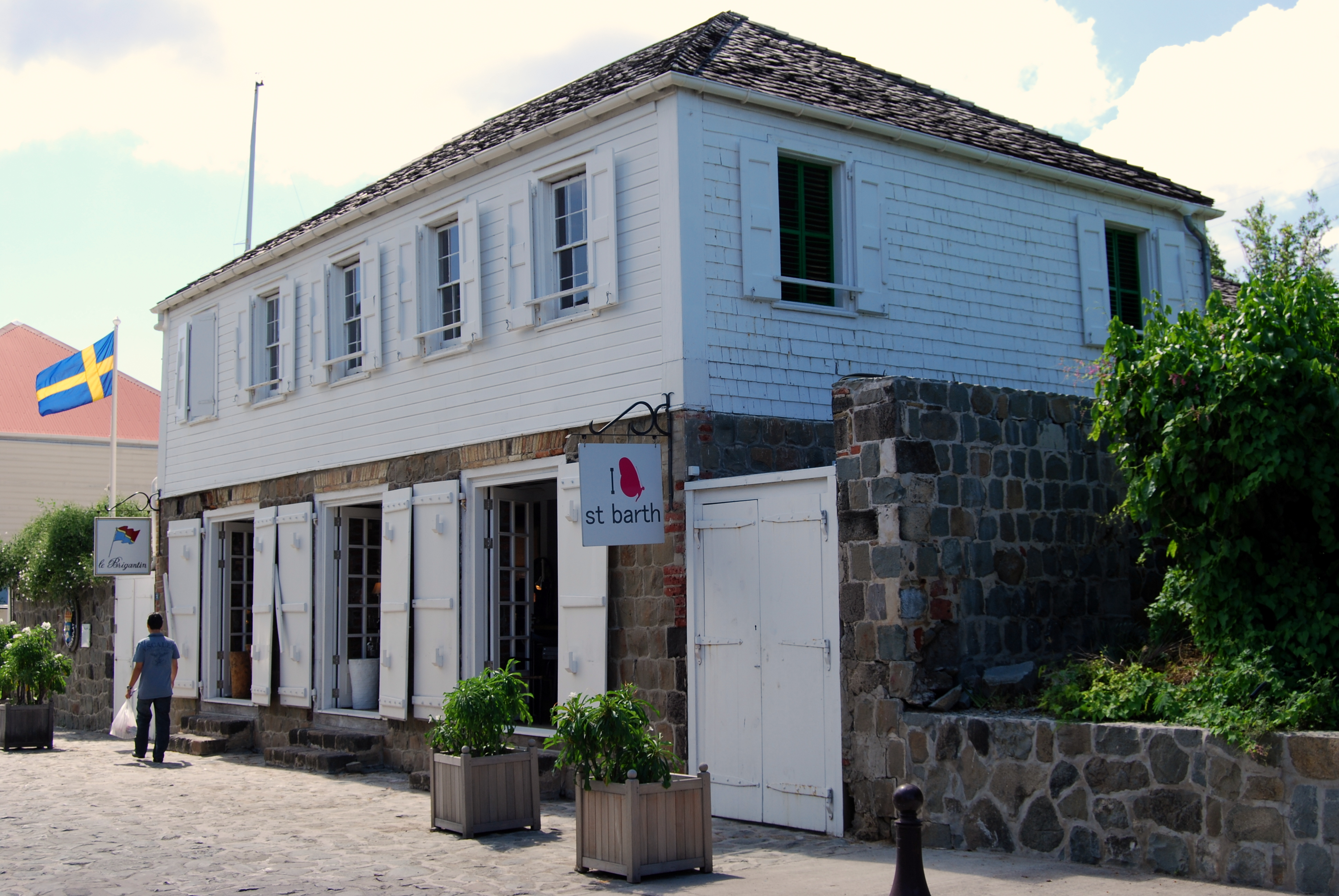
- Top: Gustavia Skyline; Middle: Gustavia lighthouse, Gustavia Municipal Museum; Bottom:Church of Our Lady of the Assumption, Mainson Dinzey

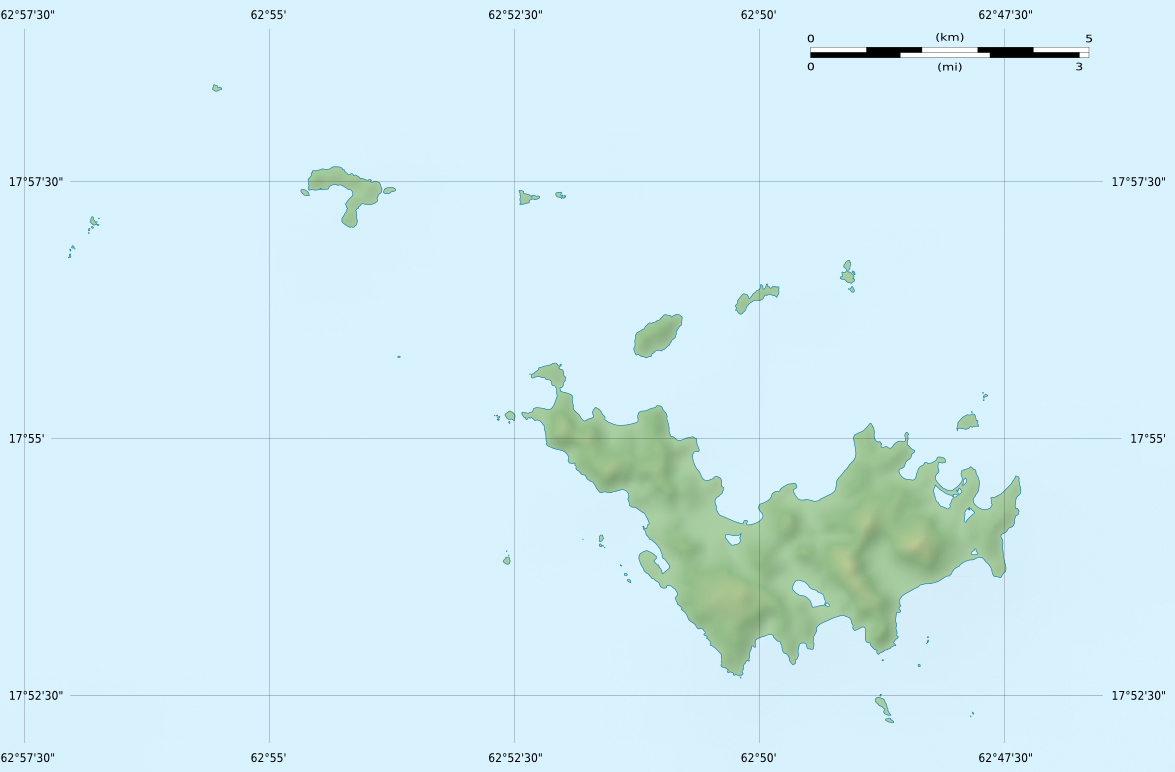
- Location within Saint Barthélemy Location within North America
- Coordinates: 17°53′52.47″N 62°51′2.0″W
- Country: France
- Overseas collectivity: Saint Barthélemy
- Founded: 1785
- Named for: King Gustav III

Government
  - Overseas Collectivity of Saint Barthélemy President (Territorial Council Pres.): Bruno Magras

Area
  - Total: 3.4 km^{2} (1.3 sq mi)

Population
  - Total: 2,300
- Time zone: UTC-04:00 (AST)
- Gustavia Lighthouse
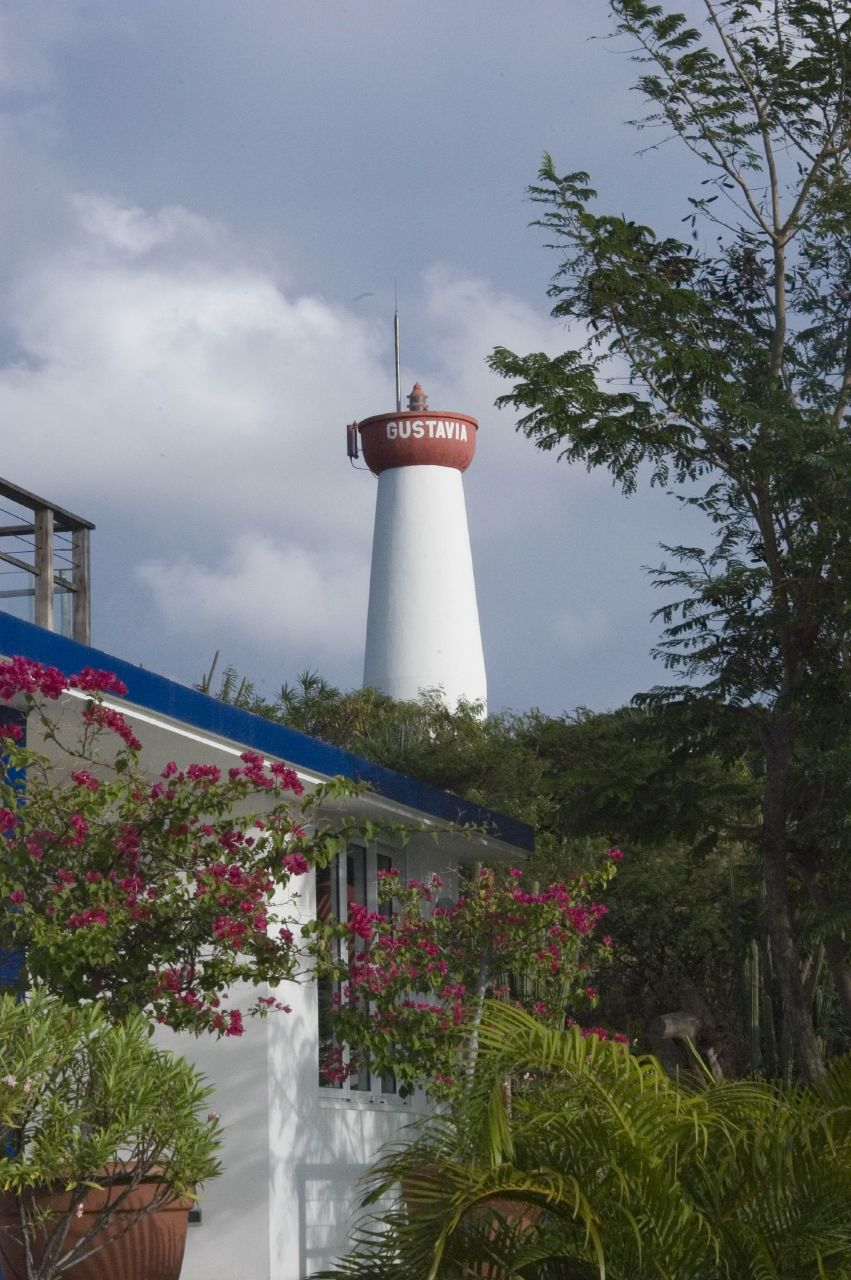
- Gustavia Lighthouse in 2007
- Constructed: 1961
- Construction: concrete (tower)
- Height: 10 m (33 ft)
- Shape: truncated cone
- Markings: White (tower), red (stripe)
- Power source: mains electricity
- Focal height: 64 m (210 ft)
- Range: 11 km (6.8 mi) (white), 8 km (5.0 mi) (red), 8 km (5.0 mi) (green)
- Characteristic: Fl(3) WRG 12s

Gustavia (/ˈɡʊstæviə/, French: [ɡystavja], Swedish: [ɡɵˈstɑːvɪa]) is the main town and capital of the island of Saint Barthélemy. Originally called Le Carénage, it was renamed in honor of King Gustav III of Sweden.

== History ==
Saint Barthélemy was first claimed by France in 1648. The island was given to Sweden in exchange for trade rights in Gothenburg in 1784 and Sweden founded the Swedish West India Company. Prospering during the Napoleonic Wars, assets were low thereafter, and the island was sold back to France in 1878.

The eventual site of Gustavia was first called Le Carénage (The Careening) after the shelter it provided to damaged ships. According to the archives, the name Gustavia appeared between December 28, 1786, and February 9, 1787. Gustavia remains as a reflection of the Swedish period, during which a minority of the population of approximately 4% were of Swedish origin.

Three forts built in the mid- to late 18th century protected the harbour: Fort Oscar (formerly Gustav Adolf), Fort Karl and Fort Gustav. There are two main churches in town, the Roman Catholic, Our Lady of the Assumption, built in 1829 and St Bartholomew's Anglican Church on the harbour front, which was built in 1855.

== Amenities ==
The sites of Fort Karl, overlooking Shell Beach south of town, and Fort Gustav, at the base of the Gustavia Lighthouse to the north, are popular with hikers. Fort Oscar, at the tip of Gustavia Peninsula, houses the Gendarmerie. There is a museum at the end of Victor Schœlcher Road on the peninsula. Gustavia has a few restaurants serving American, Italian, French and other types of food. Gustavia has many high-end boutiques that are an essential source of revenue for the island, and one of the most high class luxury hotels on the island. There is a Royal Swedish Consulate at Gustavia (Consul Dantes Magras).

== Climate ==
The climate is a tropical one with only minor variations in temperature. The island's small surface area of 24 square kilometres (9 sq mi) allows it to take advantage of the smooth and pleasant blow of trade winds. Average water and air temperatures move around 27 °C (81 °F), and the year is divided into two seasons: a dry one, referred to as Lent (Careme), and a more humid one in summer. This latter season sets in between May and November, and the ever-present sun is overcast by short passages of rainclouds with brief showers of 10 to 15 minutes. According to the Köppen Climate Classification system Gustavia has a tropical savanna climate, abbreviated Aw on climate maps.

Climate data for Gustavia (1991–2020 averages, extremes 1959–present)
Month	Jan	Feb	Mar	Apr	May	Jun	Jul	Aug	Sep	Oct	Nov	Dec	Year
Record high °C (°F)	32.6 (90.7)	32.4 (90.3)	33.7 (92.7)	33.6 (92.5)	34.3 (93.7)	34.2 (93.6)	34.3 (93.7)	34.8 (94.6)	35.3 (95.5)	35.5 (95.9)	33.9 (93.0)	32.7 (90.9)	35.5 (95.9)
Mean daily maximum °C (°F)	28.5 (83.3)	28.6 (83.5)	29.0 (84.2)	29.8 (85.6)	30.7 (87.3)	31.2 (88.2)	31.2 (88.2)	31.6 (88.9)	31.7 (89.1)	31.4 (88.5)	29.9 (85.8)	28.9 (84.0)	30.2 (86.4)
Daily mean °C (°F)	26.0 (78.8)	25.9 (78.6)	26.3 (79.3)	27.0 (80.6)	27.9 (82.2)	28.6 (83.5)	28.6 (83.5)	28.9 (84.0)	29.0 (84.2)	28.6 (83.5)	27.4 (81.3)	26.5 (79.7)	27.6 (81.7)
Mean daily minimum °C (°F)	23.5 (74.3)	23.3 (73.9)	23.5 (74.3)	24.2 (75.6)	25.1 (77.2)	25.9 (78.6)	26.0 (78.8)	26.3 (79.3)	26.2 (79.2)	25.8 (78.4)	25.0 (77.0)	24.1 (75.4)	24.9 (76.8)
Record low °C (°F)	19.5 (67.1)	18.5 (65.3)	19.5 (67.1)	19.8 (67.6)	19.0 (66.2)	21.4 (70.5)	20.6 (69.1)	21.1 (70.0)	21.4 (70.5)	20.6 (69.1)	20.2 (68.4)	19.1 (66.4)	18.5 (65.3)
Average precipitation mm (inches)	52.6 (2.07)	38.4 (1.51)	41.4 (1.63)	50.9 (2.00)	61.7 (2.43)	56.0 (2.20)	80.4 (3.17)	79.6 (3.13)	96.9 (3.81)	135.6 (5.34)	118.6 (4.67)	79.2 (3.12)	891.3 (35.09)
Average precipitation days (≥ 1.0 mm)	12.0	9.5	7.8	7.0	9.2	8.8	11.5	12.2	11.1	12.5	13.5	12.3	127.4
Source: Météo France

== Economy ==
The official currency of Saint Barthélemy is the euro.

== Education ==
The town's public preschools and primary schools, under the authority of the Académie de la Guadeloupe, are:

- École primaire Gustavia
- École maternelle Gustavia

== Notable people ==
- Eugénie Blanchard — the oldest verified person in the world at the time of her death. She spent most of her life in Gustavia.

== Gallery ==
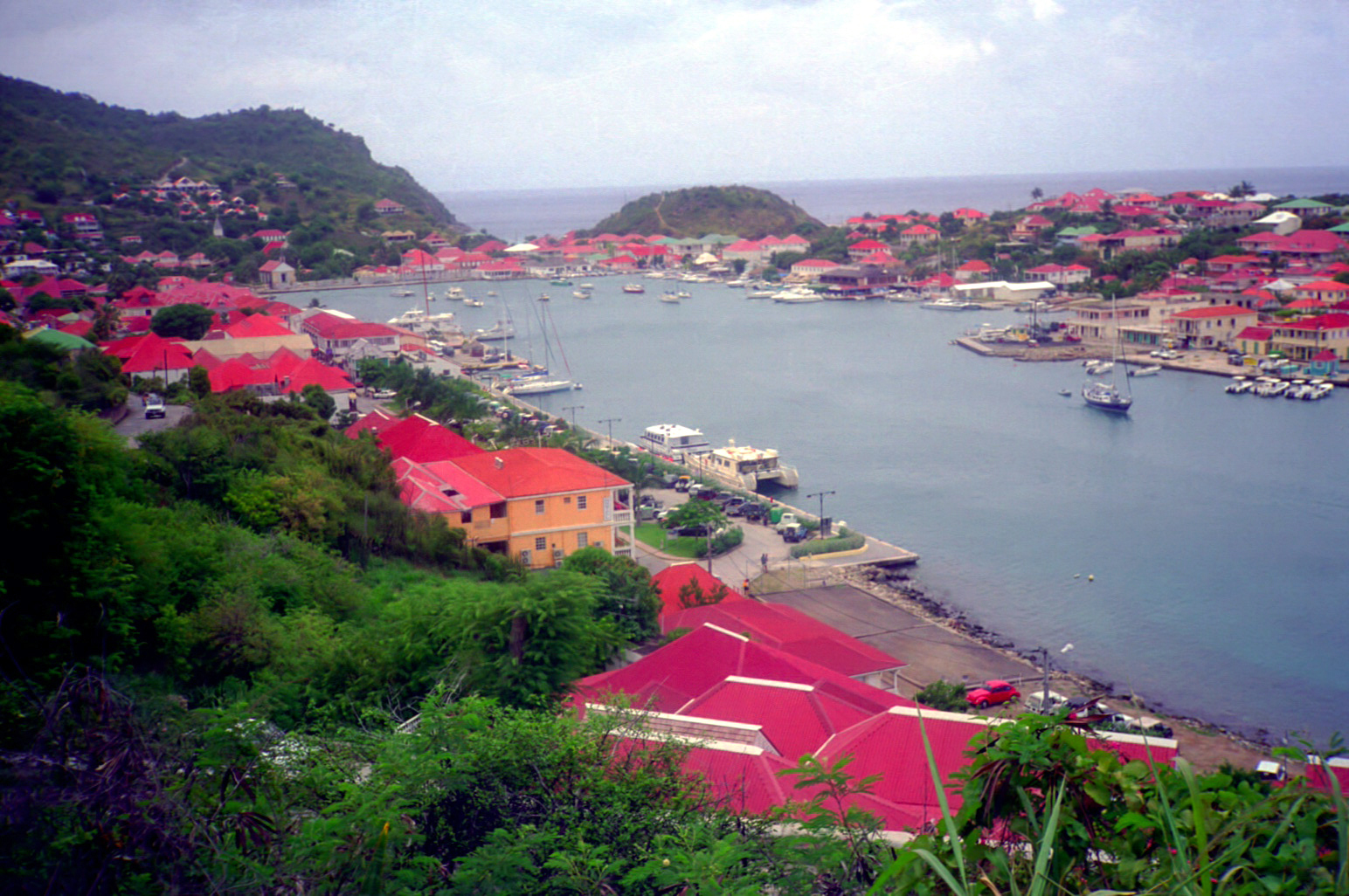
Gustavia

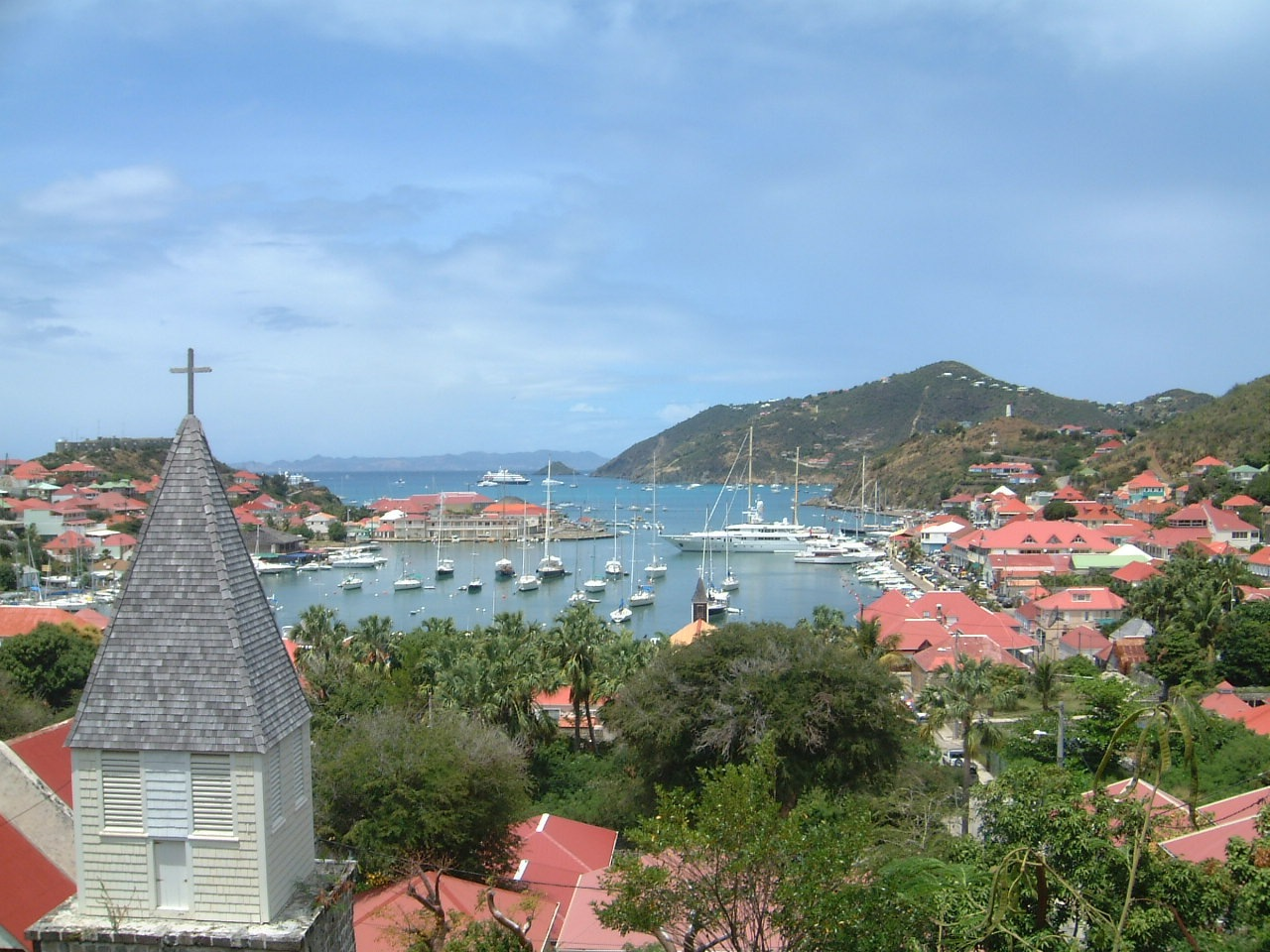
View of Gustavia

== See also ==
- List of lighthouses in Saint Barthélemy
