= FC Gustavia =

FC Gustavia was a Barthélemois football club located in Gustavia, Saint Barthélemy. The club has won the Saint-Barthelemy Championships once in 2004.

- A recent club called AS Gustavia has no link with this club.

== Honours ==
- Saint-Barthelemy Championships:
  - Winners (1): 2003–04
