= Stade de Saint-Jean =

Multi-purpose stadium in Saint-Jean, Saint Barthélemy

Coordinates: 17.9020°N 62.8417°W

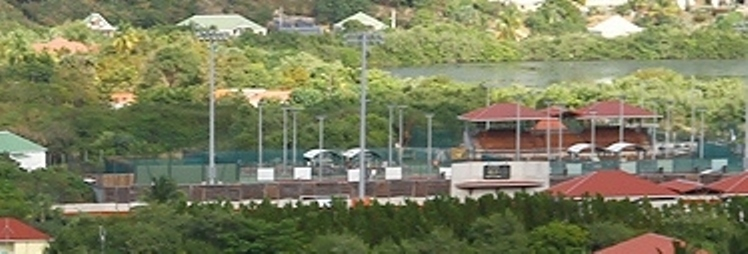
- The Stade de Saint-Jean pictured from afar
- Interactive map of Stade de Saint-Jean
- Full name: Stade de Saint-Jean
- Location: Saint-Jean, Saint Barthélemy
- Capacity: 1,000 (400 main stand)
- Surface: Artificial turf

Tenant
- Saint Barthélemy national football team

Stade de Saint-Jean is a multi-purpose stadium in the Saint-Jean quarter of Saint Barthélemy, an overseas collectivity of France in the Caribbean. It is the only stadium on the island and currently hosts matches of football, such as ones hosted by the Saint Barthélemy national football team, rugby, and beach tennis.

== History ==
Before the constructions of the stadium, the old football pitch contained grass that was regularly consumed by sheep. The area of the old football pitch is now the location of the Gustaf III Airport. The Stade de Saint-Jean was originally constructed in the 1970s in Saint-Jean, though the stadium had regular poor soil and grass conditions. Football and rugby players that practiced in the stadium regularly complained that the stadium lacked grass and that the soil was compacted.

In 2009, Roman Abramovich, Russian billionaire and then-owner of Chelsea F.C., purchased personal property on the island and donated a reported €3 million the following year to renovate the stadium. The renovation included the installation of artificial turf and an athletic track. Shortly after completion, the stadium was inaugurated with a celebrity football match which included former professionals Robert Pires and José Touré, businessman Jean-Claude Darmon, and Formula One racer Paul Belmondo. In 2017, Hurricane Irma damaged most of the island including the stadium. Its renovation was again paid for by Abramovich.

== Use ==
The stadium is mainly used for football tournaments including the Championnat de Saint-Barthelemy and those hosted by the Saint Barthélemy national football team. The tryouts of a possible women's team were also held on the island. It also hosts rugby tournaments. The Comité Territorial de Football de Saint-Barthélemy and the Ouanalao Beach Club (beach tennis) uses the stadium as its main venue.
