= Saint-Jean, Saint Barthélemy =

Saint-Jean
- Quartier
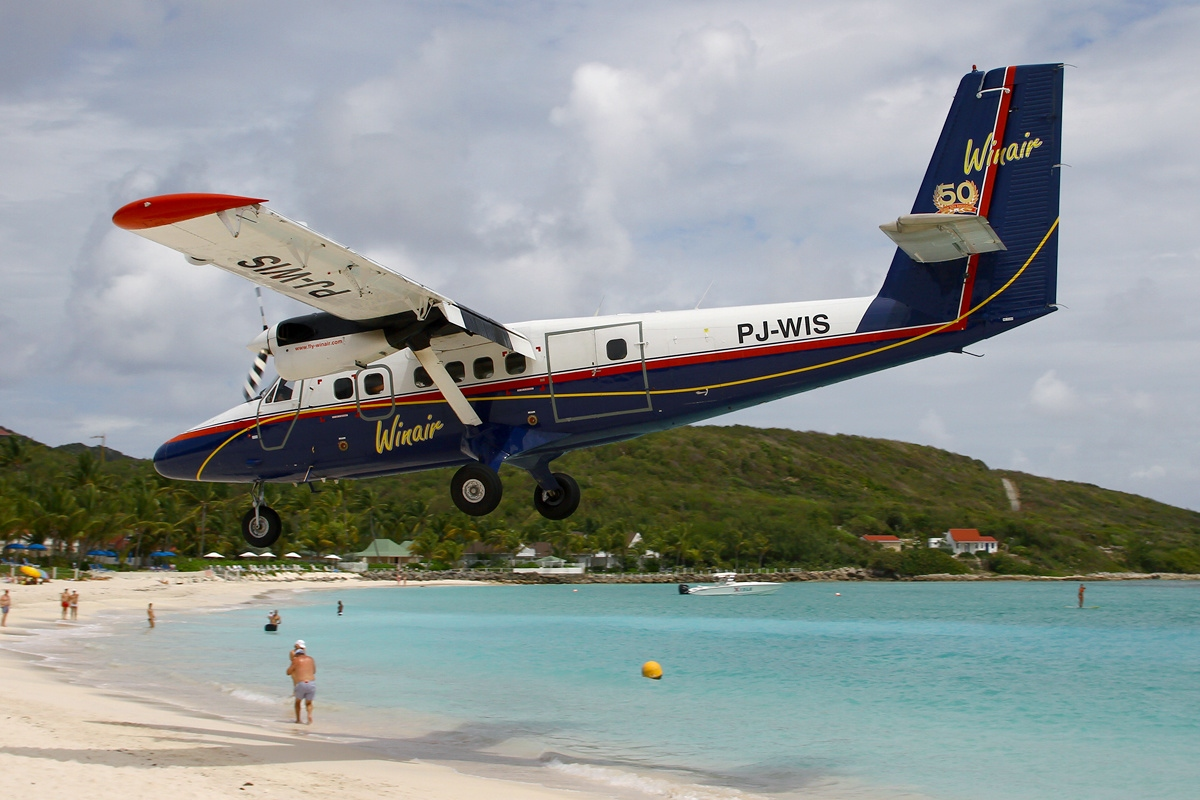
- Beach near Gustaf III Airport.

- The quartier of Saint-Jean, Saint Barthélemy marked 16.
- Coordinates: 17°54′5″N 62°50′6″W
- Country: France
- Overseas collectivity: Saint Barthélemy

Saint-Jean (French pronunciation: [sɛ̃ ʒɑ̃]) is a quartier of Saint Barthélemy in the Caribbean. It is located in the northern part of the island.
