= Sint Maarten national football team results =

The Sint Maarten national football team represents Sint Maarten in international football under the control of the Sint Maarten Football Federation. After its creation in 1986, the association became an associate member of CONCACAF, the region's governing body, on 21 April 2002. It became a full member in 2013. Sint Maarten is also a member of the Caribbean Football Union and has played in the sub-confederation's tournaments since 1989. Sint Maarten is not a member of FIFA as of August 2022. The national side did not play a single senior international fixture for nearly sixteen years between 2000 and 2016.

Below are the results of all of Sint Maarten's official matches.

== International matches ==
Key
Colour	Meaning
	Defeat
	Draw
	Win

Sint Maarten national football team results
No.	Date	Venue	H/A	Opponents	Score	Competition	Sint Maarten scorers and time of goal	Report
1	14 June 1988	Raoul Illidge Sports Complex, Philipsburg	H	Saint Martin	1–3	Friendly	Unknown	Report
2	23 April 1989	Arnos Vale Stadium, Arnos Vale	A	Saint Vincent and the Grenadines	1–6	1989 Caribbean Cup qualification	Ernie Rombley 90'+1	Report
3	7 May 1989	Raoul Illidge Sports Complex, Philipsburg	H	British Virgin Islands	1–2	1989 Caribbean Cup qualification	Unknown	Report
4	7 June 1989	Martinique	A	Martinique	0–10	1989 Caribbean Cup qualification		Report
5	18 June 1989	Ergilio Hato Stadium, Willemstad	A	Netherlands Antilles	1–2	1989 Caribbean Cup qualification	Unknown	Report
6	24 March 1990	Stade Alberic Richards, Sandy Ground	N	Cayman Islands	1–1	1990 Caribbean Cup qualification	Philippe Monwastine 62'	Report
7	29 March 1990	Stade Alberic Richards, Sandy Ground	N	Aruba	2–2	1990 Caribbean Cup qualification	Unknown	Report
8	3 April 1992	Raoul Illidge Sports Complex, Philipsburg	H	Cayman Islands	4–2	1992 Caribbean Cup qualification	Unknown	Report
9	5 April 1992	Raoul Illidge Sports Complex, Philipsburg	H	Martinique	1–1	1992 Caribbean Cup qualification	Unknown	Report
10	2 April 1993	Ronald Webster Park, The Valley	N	Antigua and Barbuda	1–0	1993 Caribbean Cup qualification	Unknown	Report
11	6 April 1993	Ronald Webster Park, The Valley	A	Anguilla	1–0	1993 Caribbean Cup qualification	Unknown	Report
12	21 May 1993	Independence Park, Kingston	N	Puerto Rico	0–3	1993 Caribbean Cup		Report
13	23 May 1993	Independence Park, Kingston	A	Jamaica	0–2	1993 Caribbean Cup		Report
14	25 May 1993	Independence Park, Kingston	N	Saint Kitts and Nevis	2–2	1993 Caribbean Cup	Unknown	Report
15	2 March 1994	Truman Bodden Sports Complex, George Town	N	Jamaica	2–3	1994 Caribbean Cup qualification	Unknown	Report
16	4 March 1994	Truman Bodden Sports Complex, George Town	A	Cayman Islands	0–5	1994 Caribbean Cup qualification		Report
17	6 March 1994	Truman Bodden Sports Complex, George Town	N	British Virgin Islands	3–0	1994 Caribbean Cup qualification	Unknown	Report
18	19 March 1995	Raoul Illidge Sports Complex, Philipsburg	H	Saint Kitts and Nevis	0–2	1995 Caribbean Cup qualification		Report
19	26 March 1995	Warner Park, Basseterre	A	Saint Kitts and Nevis	0–5	1995 Caribbean Cup qualification		Report
20	29 March 1996	Warner Park, Basseterre	N	Anguilla	4–0	1996 Caribbean Cup qualification	Unknown	Report
21	31 March 1996	Warner Park, Basseterre	A	Saint Kitts and Nevis	0–3	1996 Caribbean Cup qualification		Report
22	2 April 1997	Windsor Park, Rosseau	N	Anguilla	3–0	1997 Caribbean Cup qualification	Unknown	Report
23	4 April 1997	Windsor Park, Rosseau	A	Dominica	1–0	1997 Caribbean Cup qualification	Unknown	Report
24	6 April 1997	Windsor Park, Rosseau	N	British Virgin Islands	3–2	1997 Caribbean Cup qualification	Unknown	Report
25	15 November 1997	Warner Park, Basseterre	N	Antigua and Barbuda	1–5	1997 Leeward Islands Tournament	Unknown	Report
26	5 December 1998	Raoul Illidge Sports Complex, Philipsburg	H	Antigua and Barbuda	0–2	1998 Leeward Islands Tournament		Report
27	29 April 2000	A. O. Shirley Recreation Ground, Road Town	A	British Virgin Islands	0–0 (3–4 a.e.t.)	Friendly Tournament		Report
28	30 April 2000	A. O. Shirley Recreation Ground, Road Town	N	Dominica	1–3	Friendly Tournament	Unknown	Report
29	13 March 2016	Raoul Illidge Sports Complex, Philipsburg	H	Anguilla	2–0	Friendly	Joost Röben 5', 45'	Report
30	22 March 2016	Kirani James Athletic Stadium, St. George	A	Grenada	0–5	2017 Caribbean Cup qualification		Report
31	26 March 2016	Raoul Illidge Sports Complex, Philipsburg	H	U.S. Virgin Islands	1–2	2017 Caribbean Cup qualification	Remsley Boelijn 89'	Report
32	25 July 2018	Raoul Illidge Sports Complex, Philipsburg	H	British Virgin Islands	2–3	Friendly	Jaeremi Drijvers ?', ?'	Report
33	22 August 2018	Raoul Illidge Sports Complex, Philipsburg	H	Anguilla	1–1	Friendly	Jean-Jacques Craane ?'	Report
34	10 September 2018	Stade Sylvio Cator, Port-au-Prince	A	Haiti	0–13	2019–20 CONCACAF Nations League qualifying		Report
35	12 October 2018	Bermuda National Stadium, Devonshire Parish	A	Bermuda	0–12	2019–20 CONCACAF Nations League qualifying		Report
36	20 November 2018	Raymond E. Guishard Technical Centre, The Valley	N	Dominica	0–2	2019–20 CONCACAF Nations League qualifying		Report
37	23 March 2019	Raymond E. Guishard Technical Centre, The Valley	N	Saint Martin	4–3	2019–20 CONCACAF Nations League qualifying	Danilo Cocks 10' (o.g.); Gerwin Lake 23', 59'; Remsley Boelijn 30' (pen.)	Report
38	7 September 2019	Stade René Serge Nabajoth, Les Abymes	A	Guadeloupe	1–5	2019–20 CONCACAF Nations League qualifying	Gerwin Lake 83'	Report
39	10 October 2019	Ergilio Hato Stadium, Willemstad	N	Turks and Caicos Islands	2–5	2019–20 CONCACAF Nations League qualifying	Gerwin Lake 9', 36' (pen.)	Report
40	14 October 2019	Ergilio Hato Stadium, Willemstad	N	Guadeloupe	1–2	2019–20 CONCACAF Nations League qualifying	Gerwin Lake 75' (pen.)	Report
41	14 November 2019	TCIFA National Academy, Providenciales	A	Turks and Caicos Islands	2–3	2019–20 CONCACAF Nations League qualifying	Gerwin Lake 12'; Remsley Boelijn 46'	Report
42	6 April 2022	Trinidad Stadium, Oranjestad	A	Aruba	0–5	Friendly		Report
43	3 June 2022	Stadion Rignaal Jean Francisca, Willemstad	N	U.S. Virgin Islands	1–1	2022–23 CONCACAF Nations League C	Kay Gerritsen 82'	Report
44	6 June 2022	Stadion Rignaal Jean Francisca, Willemstad	N	Bonaire	2–2	2022–23 CONCACAF Nations League C	Jonathan Libiana 9'; Quincy Hoeve 18'	Report
45	11 June 2022	Stadion Rignaal Jean Francisca, Willemstad	N	Turks and Caicos Islands	8–2	2022–23 CONCACAF Nations League C	Gerwin Lake 2', 18', 44', 65'; Sergio Hughes 14', 63'; Kay Gerritsen 68' (pen.); Kymani Jacobs 90'+4	Report
46	14 June 2022	TCIFA National Academy, Providenciales	A	Turks and Caicos Islands	0–2	2022–23 CONCACAF Nations League C		Report
47	25 March 2023	Bethlehem Soccer Stadium, St. Croix	N	Bonaire	6–1	2022–23 CONCACAF Nations League C	Elmer de Vries 5’, Gerwin Lake 9’, 55’, 84’ (pen.), Chovanie Amatkarijo 46’, T-Shawn Illidge 62’	Report
48	28 March 2023	Bethlehem Soccer Stadium, St. Croix	A	U.S. Virgin Islands	2–1	2022–23 CONCACAF Nations League C	Gerwin Lake 58’, Jereon Cox 86’	Report
49	17 June 2023	DRV PNK Stadium, Fort Lauderdale	N	French Guiana	1–4	2023 CONCACAF Gold Cup qualification	Chovanie Amatkarijo 40’	Report

== All-time record ==
Key

- Pld = Matches played
- W = Matches won
- D = Matches drawn
- L = Matches lost
- GF = Goals for
- GA = Goals against
- GD = Goal differential
- Countries are listed in alphabetical order

As of 3 October 2026

Positive Record Neutral Record Negative Record

Opponent	Pld	W	D	L	GF	GA	GD
Anguilla	6	4	2	0	12	8	+4
Antigua and Barbuda	3	1	0	2	2	7	-5
Aruba	4	2	1	1	5	7	–2
Belize	2	1	0	1	3	3	0
Bermuda	1	0	0	1	0	12	-12
Bonaire	3	2	1	0	11	4	+7
British Virgin Islands	5	2	0	3	12	7	+5
Cayman Islands	3	1	1	1	5	8	-3
Dominica	5	1	1	3	5	7	-2
French Guiana	2	0	0	2	1	5	-4
Grenada	1	0	0	1	0	5	-5
Guadeloupe	4	0	0	4	2	13	-11
Haiti	3	0	0	3	0	27	-27
Jamaica	2	0	0	2	2	5	-3
Martinique	2	0	1	1	1	11	-10
Netherlands Antilles	1	0	0	1	0	1	-1
Puerto Rico	3	1	0	2	4	7	-3
Saint Kitts and Nevis	7	1	2	4	5	15	-10
Saint Martin	2	1	0	1	5	6	-1
Saint Lucia	2	1	0	1	3	6	-3
Saint Vincent and the Grenadines	1	0	0	1	1	6	-5
Turks and Caicos Islands	4	1	0	3	12	10	+2
Saint Vincent and the Grenadines	1	0	0	1	2	4	–2
U.S. Virgin Islands	3	1	1	1	4	4	0
Total	69	20	10	39	97	185	-91
