= J. C. Mack =

American soccer player (born 1988)

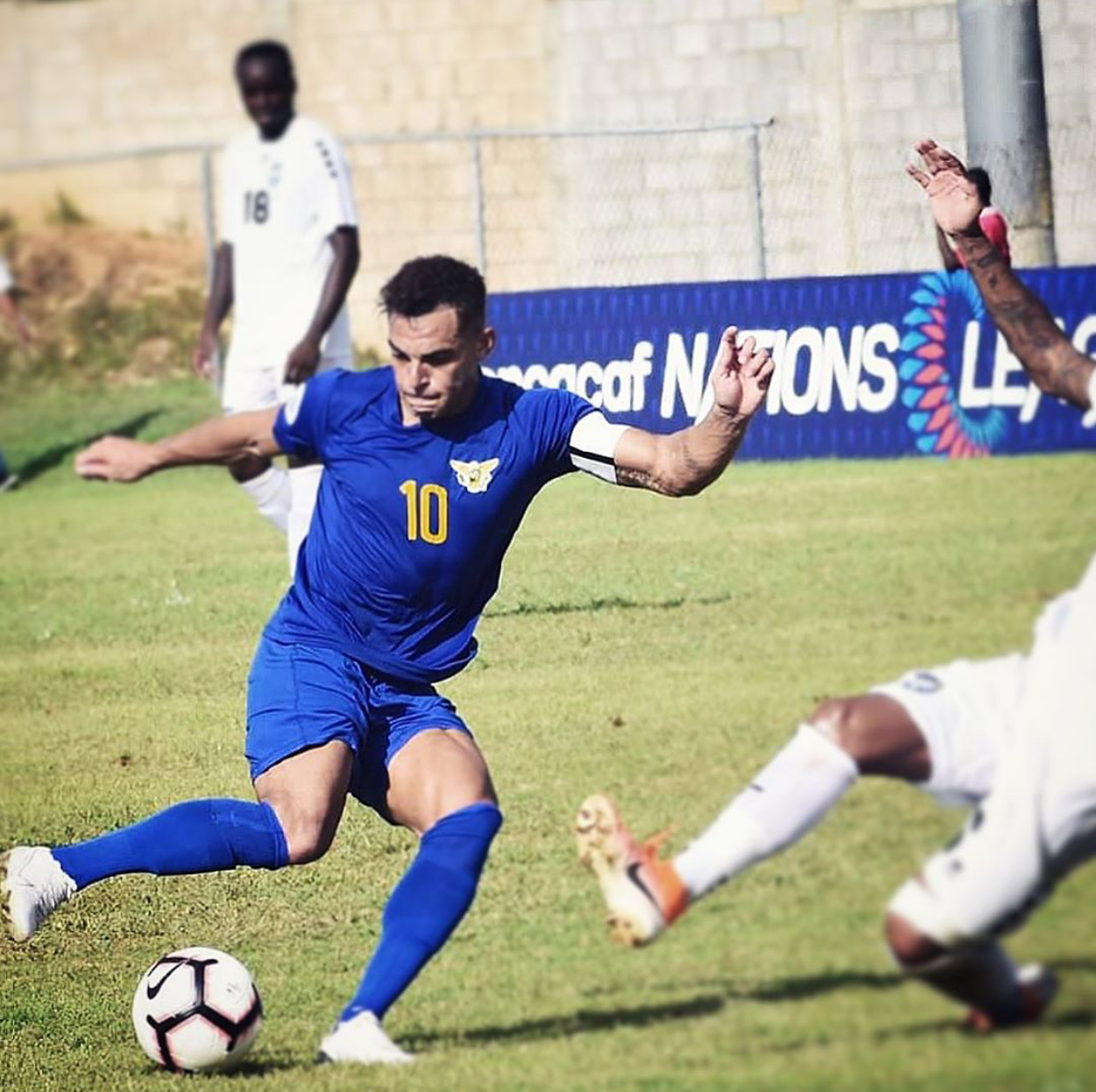
- Mack playing for the U.S. Virgin Islands in 2019

Personal information
- Full name: James Charles Mack III
- Date of birth: August 10, 1988 (age 38)
- Place of birth: Newport News, Virginia, United States
- Height: 5 ft 7 in (1.70 m)
- Position: Midfielder

Youth career
- 2005–2006: Carmel United FC
- 2008: Chicago Fire Premier

Senior career*
Years	Team	Apps	(Gls)
2008	Chicago Fire Premier	1	(0)
2009–2010	Tourcoing	19	(9)
2011–2012	Charleston Battery	26	(3)
2015	Ekenäs SC	25	(3)
2016–2017	Selfoss	44	(13)
2018	Vestri	20	(6)
2019	Víkingur Reykjavík	11	(3)
2019	Hamilton Wanderers	9	(1)
2020	Napier City Rovers	12	(5)
2020–2021	Hawke's Bay United	4	(0)
2021	Albion Park White Eagles	8	(2)
2022-2024	Napier City Rovers	14	(4)
2025	Renown SC		
2026–	Havelock North Wanderers	11	(7)

International career
2018–2024	U.S. Virgin Islands	18	(3)
- * Club domestic league appearances and goals

James Charles "J.C." Mack (born August 10, 1988) is a former professional footballer. Mack also served as captain of the U.S. Virgin Islands.

== Club career ==
=== Youth and amateur ===
Mack began playing for his local club NCSL Eagles where he won two Ohio state championships in 2003 and 2004. In 2004 Mack was spotted by ex U.S. national team goalkeeper Juergen Sommer and left Ohio to play for Sommers' U-17 Indianapolis club Carmel United Cosmos. While playing under Sommer, Mack would win an Indiana state championship and forgo university to pursue professional football. He spent 2007 trialing abroad, garnering contract offers in Peru and Trinidad. In 2008 the Chicago Fire Premier would bring him back to Chicago into the under 20 side in the Super Y-League. Mack scored 11 goals in 16 games for Chicago, winning a USL Super 20 National Championship in 2008.

=== Tourcoing ===
In 2009, Mack moved to France and went on trial with CS Louhans-Cuiseaux 71 in the French Championnat National. The three-month training period at Louhans concluded with 5 preseason matches tallying 2 assists. Mack would be passed over but recommended to Roubaix club Tourcoing. Mack then joined Union sport Tourcoing Football Club in November 2009. On November 21, 2009, Mack made his debut for Tourcoing at the hour mark in a 2–1 loss to US Marquette FC in the 7th round of the Coupe de France. Playing with Tourcoing, the 21-year-old converted winger would appear 19 times in the 2009/2010 season netting 9 goals.

=== Charleston ===
In 2011, after impressing head coach Michael Anhaeuser during the 2011 Carolina Challenge Cup, Mack signed with Charleston Battery in the USL on March 23, 2011. He made his debut for the club on April 16, 2011, in a game against the Dayton Dutch Lions. Mack would go on to play 11 Matches for the club in 2011 spending the offseason training in Denmark with FC Fyn. In 2012 Mack returned to Charleston but saw very little playing time, primarily used as a secondary midfield option to a veteran Tony Donatelli. With the time Mack was given he executed 2 goals after his first 57 minutes of league play. Mack would prove to be an important asset for Charleston when the Semi-final match ended in penalties. Converting the last penalty of the night Mack secured a spot in the USL Championship match for the Battery. Charleston would go on to beat the Wilmington Hammerheads 1–0 in the USL Championship Match.

=== Finland ===
In March 2015, Mack signed a one-year contract with Ekenäs Sport Club, a newly promoted club in Kakkonen. Tallying 3 goals and 11 assists, Mack would help the club to league security for the 2016 season.

=== Selfoss ===
On February 16, 2016, Mack signed with UMF Selfoss in the Icelandic Inkasso-Deildin. 2016 would finish with Mack as Selfoss' top scorer and contributor with 8 goals and 7 assists in all competitions. Late 2016 would see Mack renew his contract with the Icelandic club.

In 2017, Mack would again finish as the club's top goalscorer and contributor with 12 goals and 6 assists in all competitions.

=== Bhayangkara ===
In February 2018 Mack accepted an invitation to play in the Kings Cup with Indonesian champion Bhayangkara FC. Mack went on to tally one goal and one assist through 3 test matches and tournament play.

=== Vestri ===
On 16 April 2018, Mack signed a one-year contract with Vestri in Iceland 2. league. Finishing one point from promotion, Mack would finish the season with 6 goals and 12 assists in 20 appearances for the Westfjords club.

=== Víkingur ===
On January 25, 2019, Mack signed with Icelandic Premier league side Víkingur. The 2019 season would end with Vikingur as Icelandic FA cup champions.

=== Hamilton ===
On the 1st of October, Mack signed with the Hamilton Wanderers in the ISPS Handa Premiership.

=== Napier ===
In June 2020, the COVID-19 stoppage of the ISPS Handa Premiership would see Mack sign a 2-year contract with New Zealand F.A. Cup champion Napier City Rovers for the winter seasons of 2020/2021. The Virgin Islands winger would finish the season with 5 goals and 4 assists in 12 appearances for the blues.

=== Hawkes Bay ===
September 2020 Mack signed a one-year contract with Napier-based club Hawke's Bay United competing in the summer's ISPS Handa Premiership.

=== Albion Park White Eagles ===
In January 2021, Mack signed for, New South Wales club, Albion Park White Eagles, who compete in the Illawarra Premier League. By doing so he became the first international player to play in the league. The 2021 Season would be suspended due to COVID-19 lockdown.

=== Napier ===
January 2022 Mack re-joined his former club Napier City Rovers for the 2022 New Zealand National League season. The senior winger would go on to play 2 further seasons departing in 2024 with 14 matches 4 goals and 8 assists.

== International career ==
On 9 September 2018, Mack made his debut for the U.S. Virgin Islands national team during their 8–0 loss to Canada in the CONCACAF Nations League.

== Career statistics ==
Scores and results list the United States Virgin Islands' goal tally first.

No.	Date	Venue	Opponent	Score	Result	Competition
1.	22 March 2019	Raymond E. Guishard Technical Centre, The Valley, Anguilla	Anguilla	1–0	3–0	2019–20 CONCACAF Nations League qualification
2.	3 June 2022	Stadion Rignaal 'Jean' Francisca, Willemstad, Curaçao	Sint Maarten	1–0	1–1	2022–23 CONCACAF Nations League C
3.	6 June 2022	Bethlehem Soccer Stadium, Upper Bethlehem, U.S. Virgin Islands	Turks and Caicos Islands	3–2	3–2	2022–23 CONCACAF Nations League C

== Honors ==
2019 Icelandic Mjólkurbikarinn Champion

2012 USL Pro Champion

2010 Ligue Nord pas de Calais Promotion

2008 USL Super20 National Champion
