= Sint Maarteners in the Netherlands =

Sint Maarteners in the Netherlands Sint Maartenaren in Nederland
Total population
- 5,862 (2023)

Languages
- Dutch, English

Religion
- Christianity

Sint Maarteners in the Netherlands (Dutch: Sint Maartenaren in Nederland) are migrants from Sint Maarten to the Netherlands and their descendants. Until 2010, Sint Maarten formed part of the Netherlands Antilles and became a constituent country within the Kingdom of the Netherlands after its dissolution. As of 2023, figures from Statistics Netherlands showed 5,862 people of Sint Maartener origin in the Netherlands. Rotterdam has the largest Sint Maartener community with around 600 people of Sint Maartener descent. Large Sint Maartener communities can also be found in Amsterdam, Tilburg, Almere and The Hague.

== Notable people ==
- Chovanie Amatkarijo
- Sergio Hughes
- Gerwin Lake
- Toshio Lake
- Jeremy de Nooijer
- Mitchell de Nooijer
