= 2022–23 CONCACAF Nations League =

Tournament details
- Dates: League phase: 2 June 2022 – 28 March 2023; Nations League Finals: 15–18 June 2023
- Teams: 41

Final positions
- Champions: United States (2nd title)
- Runners-up: Canada
- Third place: Mexico
- Fourth place: Panama

Tournament statistics
- Matches played: 105
- Goals scored: 304 (2.9 per match)
- Top scorer(s): (Sint Maarten) Gerwin Lake (8 goals)
- Best player: (United States) Christian Pulisic
- Best goalkeeper: (United States) Matt Turner
- Fair play award: Panama

The 2022–23 CONCACAF Nations League was the second season of the CONCACAF Nations League, an international association football competition involving the men's national teams of the 41 member associations of CONCACAF. The group phase of the tournament started on 2 June 2022, and the Finals, which decided the champions, was played from 15 to 18 June 2023 at Allegiant Stadium in Paradise, Nevada, United States. The Nations League also served as a qualifier for the 2023 CONCACAF Gold Cup.

The United States were the defending champions, and successfully retained their title after defeating Canada 2–0 in the final.

== Schedule ==
The format for the 2022–23 Nations League was announced by CONCACAF on 27 July 2020. Due to the 2022 FIFA World Cup in Qatar taking place at the end of the year, the league phase was played in June 2022 and March 2023.

Stage	Round	Dates
League phase	Matchday 1	2–4 June 2022
League phase	Matchday 2	5–7 June 2022
League phase	Matchday 3	9–11 June 2022
League phase	Matchday 4	12–14 June 2022
League phase	Matchday 5	23–25 March 2023
League phase	Matchday 6	26–28 March 2023
Finals	Semi-finals	15 June 2023
Finals	Third place play-off	18 June 2023
Finals	Final	18 June 2023

== Format ==
=== Tiebreakers ===
The ranking of teams in each group was determined as follows (Regulations Article 12.3):

1. Points obtained in all group matches (three points for a win, one for a draw, zero for a loss);
2. Goal difference in all group matches;
3. Number of goals scored in all group matches;
4. Points obtained in the matches played between the teams in question;
5. Goal difference in the matches played between the teams in question;
6. Number of goals scored in the matches played between the teams in question;
7. Number of away goals scored in the matches played between the teams in question (if the tie was only between two teams);
8. Fair play points in all group matches (only one deduction could be applied to a player in a single match):
  - Yellow card: −1 points;
  - Indirect red card (second yellow card): −3 points;
  - Direct red card: −4 points;
  - Yellow card and direct red card: −5 points;
9. Drawing of lots.

== Seeding ==
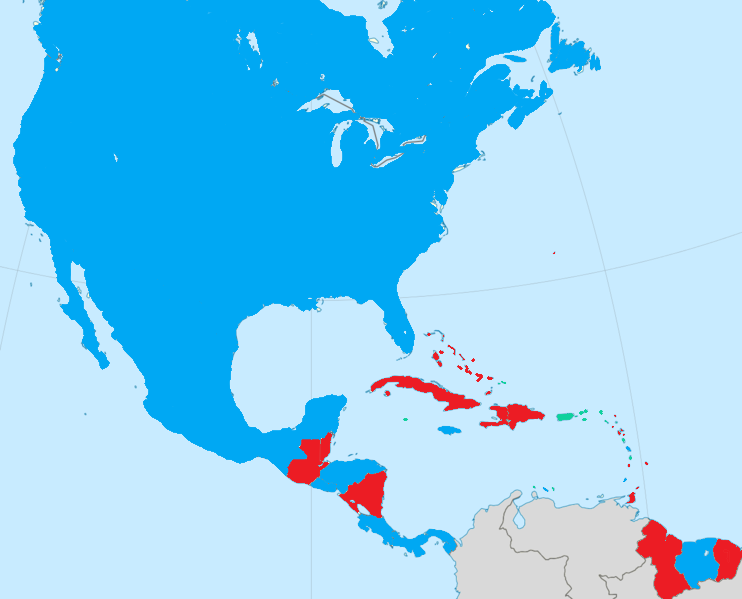
Map showing the leagues each national team will participate in. League A League B League C

All 41 CONCACAF national teams entered the competition. The four teams which finished bottom of each group in Leagues A and B from the 2019–20 season moved down a league, while the four teams which finished top of each group in Leagues B and C moved up. The remaining teams stayed in their respective leagues.

The draw for the league phase took place in Miami, Florida, United States on 4 April 2022, 19:00 EDT. Each of the League's draws began by randomly selecting a team from Pot 1 and placing them in Group A of their respective league. The draws continued by selecting the remaining teams from Pot 1 and positioning them into Groups B, C and D in sequential order. The same procedure was done for the remaining pots. Teams were seeded into pots using CONCACAF Ranking.

Key
▲	Promoted in previous season
▼	Relegated in previous season

League A
Pot	Team	Prv	Pts	Rank
1	Mexico		2,020	1
1	United States		1,917	2
1	Canada		1,821	3
1	Costa Rica		1,805	4
2	Panama		1,624	5
2	Jamaica	▲	1,471	6
2	El Salvador	▲	1,390	9
2	Honduras		1,350	10
3	Martinique		1,252	11
3	Curaçao		1,249	12
3	Suriname	▲	1,089	15
3	Grenada	▲	834	25

League B
Pot	Team	Prv	Pts	Rank
1	Haiti	▼	1,432	7
1	Guatemala	▲	1,417	8
1	Trinidad and Tobago	▼	1,232	13
1	Cuba	▼	1,096	14
2	French Guiana		1,030	16
2	Guadeloupe	▲	1,011	17
2	Nicaragua		986	18
2	Bermuda	▼	973	19
3	Antigua and Barbuda		953	20
3	Guyana		924	21
3	Dominican Republic		872	23
3	Saint Vincent and the Grenadines		865	24
4	Belize		795	26
4	Montserrat		767	27
4	Barbados	▲	674	31
4	Bahamas	▲	538	33

League C
Pot	Team	Prv	Pts	Rank
1	Saint Kitts and Nevis	▼	910	22
1	Puerto Rico		725	28
1	Bonaire		718	29
1	Saint Lucia	▼	709	30
2	Dominica	▼	625	32
2	Aruba	▼	528	34
2	Cayman Islands		512	35
2	Turks and Caicos Islands		448	36
3	Saint Martin		381	37
3	Sint Maarten		296	38
3	U.S. Virgin Islands		246	39
3	Anguilla		218	40
3	British Virgin Islands		152	41

== League A ==
=== Group A ===
Pos	Team	Pld	W	D	L	GF	GA	GD	Pts	Qualification	(Mexico)	(Jamaica)	(Suriname)
1	Mexico	4	2	2	0	8	3	+5	8	Qualification for Finals and Gold Cup	—	2–2	3–0
2	Jamaica	4	1	3	0	7	5	+2	6	Qualification for Gold Cup	1–1	—	3–1
3	Suriname	4	0	1	3	2	9	−7	1	Advance to Gold Cup prelims	0–2	1–1	—

Source: CONCACAF

=== Group B ===
Pos	Team	Pld	W	D	L	GF	GA	GD	Pts	Qualification	(Panama)	(Costa Rica)	(Martinique)
1	Panama	4	3	1	0	8	0	+8	10	Qualification for Finals and Gold Cup	—	2–0	5–0
2	Costa Rica	4	2	0	2	4	4	0	6	Qualification for Gold Cup	0–1	—	2–0
3	Martinique	4	0	1	3	1	9	−8	1	Advance to Gold Cup prelims	0–0	1–2	—

Source: CONCACAF

=== Group C ===
Pos	Team	Pld	W	D	L	GF	GA	GD	Pts	Qualification	(Canada)	(Honduras)	(Curaçao)
1	Canada	4	3	0	1	11	3	+8	9	Qualification for Finals and Gold Cup	—	4–1	4–0
2	Honduras	4	2	0	2	5	7	−2	6	Qualification for Gold Cup	2–1	—	1–2
3	Curaçao	4	1	0	3	2	8	−6	3	Advance to Gold Cup prelims	0–2	0–1	—

Source: CONCACAF

=== Group D ===
Pos	Team	Pld	W	D	L	GF	GA	GD	Pts	Qualification	(United States)	(El Salvador)	(Grenada)
1	United States	4	3	1	0	14	2	+12	10	Qualification for Finals and Gold Cup	—	1–0	5–0
2	El Salvador	4	1	2	1	6	5	+1	5	Qualification for Gold Cup	1–1	—	3–1
3	Grenada	4	0	1	3	4	17	−13	1	Advance to Gold Cup prelims	1–7	2–2	—

Source: CONCACAF

=== Nations League Finals ===
==== Seeding ====
The four teams were ranked based on their results in the group stage to determine the semi-final matchups. The first seed played the fourth seed and the second seed played the third seed.

Seed	Grp	Team	Pld	W	D	L	GF	GA	GD	Pts
1	D	United States (H)	4	3	1	0	14	2	+12	10
2	B	Panama	4	3	1	0	8	0	+8	10
3	C	Canada	4	3	0	1	11	3	+8	9
4	A	Mexico	4	2	2	0	8	3	+5	8

Source: CONCACAF
Rules for classification: Tiebreakers
(H) Hosts

==== Bracket ====
Semi-finals
15 June – Paradise
Panama	0
Canada	2
15 June – Paradise
United States	3
Mexico	0

Final
18 June – Paradise
Canada	0
United States	2
Third place play-off
18 June – Paradise
Panama	0
Mexico	1

All times are local, PDT (UTC−7).

==== Semi-finals ====
15 June 2023
16:00

Panama	0–2	Canada
	Report	David 25'; Davies 70'

Allegiant Stadium, Paradise
Attendance: 65,000
Referee: Juan Gabriel Calderón (Costa Rica)

15 June 2023
19:00

United States	3–0	Mexico
Pulisic 37', 46'; Pepi 79'	Report

Allegiant Stadium, Paradise
Attendance: 65,000
Referee: Iván Barton (El Salvador)

==== Third place play-off ====
18 June 2023
15:00

Panama	0–1	Mexico
	Report	Gallardo 4'

Allegiant Stadium, Paradise
Attendance: 35,000
Referee: Daneon Parchment (Jamaica)

==== Final ====
18 June 2023
18:00

Canada	0–2	United States
	Report	Richards 12'; Balogun 34'

Allegiant Stadium, Paradise
Attendance: 35,000
Referee: Saíd Martínez (Honduras)

== League B ==
=== Group A ===
Pos	Team	Pld	W	D	L	GF	GA	GD	Pts	Promotion or qualification	(Cuba)	(Guadeloupe)	(Antigua and Barbuda)	(Barbados)
1	Cuba (P)	6	5	0	1	11	3	+8	15	Promotion and Gold Cup	—	1–0	3–1	3–0
2	Guadeloupe	6	3	0	3	5	5	0	9	Advance to Gold Cup prelims	2–1	—	0–1	2–1
3	Antigua and Barbuda (Note: Antigua and Barbuda was awarded a Gold Cup preliminary round berth as the best-performing third place team.)	6	3	0	3	5	7	−2	9	Advance to Gold Cup prelims	0–2	1–0	—	1–2
4	Barbados	6	1	0	5	3	9	−6	3		0–1	0–1	0–1	—

Source: CONCACAF
(P) Promoted

=== Group B ===
Pos	Team	Pld	W	D	L	GF	GA	GD	Pts	Promotion or qualification	(Haiti)	(Guyana)	(Bermuda)	(Montserrat)
1	Haiti (P)	6	5	1	0	22	5	+17	16	Promotion and Gold Cup	—	6–0	3–1	3–2
2	Guyana	6	3	1	2	8	14	−6	10	Advance to Gold Cup prelims	2–6	—	2–1	0–0
3	Bermuda	6	1	1	4	7	10	−3	4		0–0	0–2	—	3–0
4	Montserrat	6	1	1	4	6	14	−8	4		0–4	1–2	3–2	—

Source: CONCACAF
(P) Promoted

=== Group C ===
Pos	Team	Pld	W	D	L	GF	GA	GD	Pts	Promotion or qualification	(Nicaragua)	(Trinidad and Tobago)	(The Bahamas)	(Saint Vincent and the Grenadines)
1	Nicaragua	6	4	2	0	15	5	+10	14	Disqualified (Note: Nicaragua was disqualified from the 2023 Gold Cup and Nations League A promotion due to fielding an ineligible player. Trinidad and Tobago took their place in both tournaments as the best runner-up in League B.)	—	2–1	4–0	4–1
2	Trinidad and Tobago (P)	6	4	1	1	12	4	+8	13	Promotion and Gold Cup	1–1	—	1–0	4–1
3	Bahamas	6	1	1	4	2	11	−9	4		0–2	0–3	—	1–0
4	Saint Vincent and the Grenadines	6	0	2	4	5	14	−9	2		2–2	0–2	1–1	—

Source: CONCACAF
(P) Promoted

=== Group D ===
Pos	Team	Pld	W	D	L	GF	GA	GD	Pts	Promotion or qualification	(Guatemala)	(French Guiana)	(Dominican Republic)	(Belize)
1	Guatemala (P)	6	4	1	1	11	4	+7	13	Promotion and Gold Cup	—	4–0	2–0	2–0
2	French Guiana	6	3	2	1	8	8	0	11	Advance to Gold Cup prelims	2–0	—	1–1	1–0
3	Dominican Republic	6	2	2	2	8	7	+1	8		1–1	2–3	—	2–0
4	Belize	6	0	1	5	2	10	−8	1		1–2	1–1	0–2	—

Source: CONCACAF
(P) Promoted

=== Ranking of second-placed teams ===
Due to the disqualification of Nicaragua, the ranking of all second-placed teams was used to determine which team would replace them in League A.

Pos	Grp	Team	Pld	W	D	L	GF	GA	GD	Pts	Promotion or qualification
1	C	Trinidad and Tobago (P)	6	4	1	1	12	4	+8	13	Promotion and Gold Cup
2	D	French Guiana	6	3	2	1	8	8	0	11	Advance to Gold Cup prelims
3	B	Guyana	6	3	1	2	8	14	−6	10	Advance to Gold Cup prelims
4	A	Guadeloupe	6	3	0	3	5	5	0	9	Advance to Gold Cup prelims

Source: CONCACAF
Rules for classification: Tiebreakers
(P) Promoted

=== Ranking of third-placed teams ===
As Trinidad and Tobago replaced Nicaragua in the Gold Cup, the ranking of all third-placed teams was used to determine which team would replace them in the Gold Cup preliminary round.

Pos	Grp	Team	Pld	W	D	L	GF	GA	GD	Pts	Qualification
1	A	Antigua and Barbuda	6	3	0	3	5	7	−2	9	Advance to Gold Cup prelims
2	D	Dominican Republic	6	2	2	2	8	7	+1	8	
3	B	Bermuda	6	1	1	4	7	10	−3	4	
4	C	Bahamas	6	1	1	4	2	11	−9	4	

Source: CONCACAF
Rules for classification: Tiebreakers

== League C ==
=== Group A ===
Pos	Team	Pld	W	D	L	GF	GA	GD	Pts	Promotion or qualification	(Sint Maarten)	(Bonaire)	(Turks and Caicos Islands)	(United States Virgin Islands)
1	Sint Maarten (P)	6	3	2	1	19	9	+10	11	Promotion and Gold Cup prelims	—	6–1	8–2	1–1
2	Bonaire	6	3	1	2	12	11	+1	10		2–2	—	1–2	2–0
3	Turks and Caicos Islands	6	3	0	3	10	16	−6	9		2–0	1–4	—	1–0
4	U.S. Virgin Islands	6	1	1	4	5	10	−5	4		1–2	0–2	3–2	—

Source: CONCACAF
(P) Promoted

=== Group B ===
Pos	Team	Pld	W	D	L	GF	GA	GD	Pts	Promotion or qualification	(Saint Kitts and Nevis)	(Aruba)	(Collectivity of Saint Martin)
1	Saint Kitts and Nevis (P)	4	3	1	0	9	4	+5	10	Promotion and Gold Cup prelims	—	2–0	1–1
2	Aruba	4	1	1	2	5	5	0	4		2–3	—	3–0
3	Saint Martin	4	0	2	2	2	7	−5	2		1–3	0–0	—

Source: CONCACAF
(P) Promoted

=== Group C ===
Pos	Team	Pld	W	D	L	GF	GA	GD	Pts	Promotion or qualification	(Saint Lucia)	(Anguilla)	(Dominica)
1	Saint Lucia (P)	4	4	0	0	8	2	+6	12	Promotion and Gold Cup prelims	—	2–0	3–1
2	Anguilla	4	0	2	2	2	5	−3	2		1–2	—	0–0
3	Dominica	4	0	2	2	2	5	−3	2		0–1	1–1	—

Source: CONCACAF
(P) Promoted

=== Group D ===
Pos	Team	Pld	W	D	L	GF	GA	GD	Pts	Promotion or qualification	(Puerto Rico)	(Cayman Islands)	(British Virgin Islands)
1	Puerto Rico (P)	4	4	0	0	17	2	+15	12	Promotion and Gold Cup prelims	—	5–1	6–0
2	Cayman Islands	4	0	2	2	3	10	−7	2		0–3	—	1–1
3	British Virgin Islands	4	0	2	2	3	11	−8	2		1–3	1–1	—

Source: CONCACAF
(P) Promoted

== Top goalscorers ==
League A
Rank	Player	Goals
1	(Canada) Jonathan David	4
1	(United States) Jesús Ferreira	4
1	(United States) Ricardo Pepi	4
4	(Canada) Alphonso Davies	3
4	(Canada) Cyle Larin	3
4	(United States) Christian Pulisic	3
7	(El Salvador) Nelson Bonilla	2
7	(El Salvador) Alexander Larín	2
7	(Jamaica) Junior Flemmings	2
7	(Panama) Yoel Bárcenas	2
7	(United States) Weston McKennie	2

League B
Rank	Player	Goals
1	(Haiti) Carnejy Antoine	5
2	(Cuba) Arichel Hernández	4
2	(French Guiana) Joel Sarrucco	4
2	(Haiti) Mondy Prunier	4
5	(Guadeloupe) Thierry Ambrose	3
5	(Guatemala) Rubio Rubin	3
5	(Guyana) Omari Glasgow	3
5	(Haiti) Derrick Etienne	3
5	(Haiti) Frantzdy Pierrot	3
5	(Montserrat) Lyle Taylor	3
5	(Nicaragua) Matías Moldskred	3
5	(Nicaragua) Jaime Moreno	3
5	(Nicaragua) Ariagner Smith	3

League C
Rank	Player	Goals
1	(Sint Maarten) Gerwin Lake	8
2	(Puerto Rico) Ricardo Rivera	6
3	(Bonaire) Ayrton Cicilia	5
4	(Turks and Caicos Islands) Billy Forbes	4
5	(Saint Lucia) Kurt Frederick	3
5	(Turks and Caicos Islands) Junior Paul	3
