= Quincy Hoeve =

Bonairean footballer (born 2003)

Personal information
- Full name: Quincy Anthony Edgar Nathan Hoeve
- Date of birth: 3 April 2003 (age 23)
- Place of birth: Kralendijk, Bonaire
- Height: 1.90 m (6 ft 3 in)
- Position: Forward

Team information
- Current team: Piteå IF
- Number: 25

Youth career
- 2014–2019: Atlétiko Tera Corá
- 2019–2021: Sparta Rotterdam
- 2021–2022: Gil Vicente
- 2022–2023: Volendam

Senior career*
Years	Team	Apps	(Gls)
2022–2025	Jong Volendam	57	(16)
2023–2025	Volendam	26	(0)
2025	→ Jong Sparta (loan)	11	(5)
2025–2026	Jong Sparta	34	(11)
2026–	Piteå IF	15	(3)

International career^{‡}
2022–2024	Bonaire	8	(2)
- * Club domestic league appearances and goals as of 16 November 2026 ‡ National team caps and goals as of 20:01, 21 November 2024 (UTC)

Quincy Anthony Edgar Nathan Hoeve (born 3 April 2003) is a Bonairean professional footballer who plays as a forward for Ettan Norra club Piteå IF. He has formerly represented the Bonaire national team.

== Club career ==
=== Youth ===
While playing for SV Atlétiko Tera Corá of the Bonaire League, Hoeve was scouted by Sparta Rotterdam and signed for the Dutch club's academy in April 2019.

In summer 2019 Hoeve traveled with Sparta Rotterdam's senior squad for a 2019–20 KNVB Cup match, but did not see action. His first goal for the club came on 27 September 2019 in a 3–1 victory over the under-17 team of powerhouse Ajax. Two weeks later he scored again, this time in a victory against Vitesse U17. Hoeve had scored in three straight matches following a two-goal friendly performance against Almere City later that month. In December of that year, the player scored a brace against FC Groningen U17 which helped qualify Sparta Rotterdam for the Championship Group for the second half of the season. Hoeve began 2020 similar to 2019 with a goal against AFC in a 3–3 friendly draw. He went on to score a brace against the academy of FC Utrecht in March 2020.

In May 2021 Hoeve went on trial with Eredivisie clubs Go Ahead Eagles and FC Den Bosch. However, following two successful seasons in the Netherlands, he joined Gil Vicente of Portugal's Primeira Liga in September 2021. He continued his scoring form with the club, including a strike against Paços de Ferreira under-19 in December 2021.

In late August 2022 Hoeve returned to the Netherlands and joined the youth team of Volendam of the Eredivisie after a short training period. Shortly thereafter he made his league debut for the club against Koninklijke HFC, scoring the only goal in the 1–0 victory.

=== Senior ===
Hoeve made his Eredivisie debut with the Volendam first team on 19 August 2023. He came on as a second-half substitute for Lequincio Zeefuik in a 4–1 defeat to Go Ahead Eagles.

On 28 January 2025, Hoeve moved on loan to Jong Sparta (the reserve team of Sparta Rotterdam) until the end of the season.

In August 2026, Hoeve moved to Sweden where he joined Ettan Norra club Piteå IF.

== International career ==
Hoeve received his first senior international call-up in November 2018 at the age of fifteen for 2019–20 CONCACAF Nations League qualifying matches against the Dominican Republic and Jamaica. However, he did not go on to appear in either match. He received his next call-up for 2022–23 CONCACAF Nations League C matches against Turks and Caicos, Sint Maarten, and the United States Virgin Islands in June 2022.

He made his debut on 3 June 2022 in Bonaire's opening match against the Turks and Caicos Islands. He started and played seventy five minutes of the eventual 4–1 victory. Three days later he scored his first international goal in a 2–2 draw with Sint Maarten in the second match of the tournament.

=== Career statistics ===
As of match played 5 September 2024.

Bonaire
Year	Apps	Goals
2022	3	1
2023	2	0
2024	2	1
Total	7	2

Scores and results list Bonaire's goal tally first.

No.	Date	Venue	Opponent	Score	Result	Competition
1	6 June 2022	Stadion Rignaal 'Jean' Francisca, Willemstad, Curaçao	Sint Maarten	2–0	2–2	2022–23 CONCACAF Nations League C
2	5 September 2024	Stadion Antonio Trenidat, Rincon, Bonaire	Saint Vincent and the Grenadines	1–0	1–1	2024–25 CONCACAF Nations League B
Last updated 6 June 2022
