= Nico Beyer (footballer) =

German footballer

Personal information
- Date of birth: 22 September 1996 (age 30)
- Place of birth: Berlin, Germany
- Height: 1.89 m (6 ft 2 in)
- Position: Centre-back

Team information
- Current team: FC Brandenburg 03
- Number: 23

Youth career
- –2006: Eintracht Mahlsdorf
- 2006–2015: Hertha BSC

Senior career*
Years	Team	Apps	(Gls)
2015–2018	Hertha BSC II	62	(0)
2018–2019	FSV Zwickau	1	(0)
2019	Berliner AK 07	0	(0)
2020–	FC Brandenburg 03	5	(0)
- * Club domestic league appearances and goals as of 23:49, 15 May 2020 (UTC)

Nico Beyer (born 22 September 1996) is a German footballer who plays as a centre-back for FC Brandenburg 03.

== Career ==
In the summer of 2018, Beyer moved to 3. Liga club FSV Zwickau on a two-year contract. Beyer made his professional debut for FSV Zwickau in the 3. Liga on 27 October 2018, coming on as a substitute in the 90+2nd minute for Tarsis Bonga in the 0–0 away draw against Wehen Wiesbaden.
