= Gerwin Lake =

Sint Maarten footballer

Personal information
- Full name: Gerwin Darrel Miguel Lake
- Date of birth: 9 April 1996 (age 30)
- Place of birth: Netherlands
- Position: Winger

Team information
- Current team: Rijnmond HS

Youth career
- –2014: Spijkenisse
- 2014–2015: Spartaan '20

Senior career*
Years	Team	Apps	(Gls)
2015–2016	VV Oude Maas		
2016–2017	Dordrecht	0	(0)
2017	VV Oude Maas		
2017–2018	Excelsior Maassluis	13	(3)
2018–2021	Poortugaal	65	(31)
2021	Flames United	5	(2)
2021–2024	Poortugaal	62	(31)
2024–2025	Spijkenisse		
2025–	Rijnmond HS		

International career^{‡}
2019–	Sint Maarten	29	(21)
- * Club domestic league appearances and goals as of 20 July 2025 ‡ National team caps and goals as of 17 November 2026

Gerwin Darrell Miguel "Smally" Lake (born 9 April 1996) is a footballer who plays as a winger for Rijnmond HS. Born in the Netherlands, he represents the Sint Maarten national team.

== Club career ==
Lake played for the youth teams of VV Spijkenisse. After not being promoted to the first team, he joined Spartaan '20 and played for the A1 team. He left the club and joined VV Oude Maas in 2015. Lake drew the attention of FC Dordrecht of the Eredivisie because of his scoring rate at Oude Maas. He joined Dordrecht in 2016 but left after only one season that was plagued by injury. Although he did not make an appearance for Dordrecht's first team, he did appear for the reserve side, scoring the game-winner from a volley in a 2–1 victory over PEC Zwolle's reserve team.

After a half-season return to VV Oude Maas, he then joined Excelsior Maassluis of the Tweede Divisie from 2017 to 2018. Lake was reportedly a player of interest to Excelsior before he joined FC Dordrecht after scoring over 15 goals and topping the scoring charts with VV Oude Maas in 2016. In total he made 13 league appearances for Maassluis, scoring 3 goals. He also made an appearance in the 2017–18 KNVB Cup as Maassluis was knocked out with a second preliminary round defeat to FC Lisse. Both player and club management had high expectations for the attacking player at his signing, with Lake predicting that he would score 10 to 15 goals that season.

In February 2018, it was announced that Lake would leave Excelsior Maassluis and sign for SV Poortugaal, a club formed from the merger of PSV Poortugaal and his former club VV Oude Maas. Lake cited a lack of playing time as his reason for leaving the club. Lake found his scoring touch again with Poortugaal in 2019, including a four-goal match against RKVV Westlandia on 19 January.

In January 2021, Lake signed a contract extension with SV Poortugaal for the 2020–21 Hoofdklasse season In May of that year he joined Flames United for a short stint ahead of the club's 2021 Caribbean Club Championship campaign. He started and played the full 90 minutes of the team's opening match, a 1–11 defeat to O&M FC of the Dominican Republic. He repeated the performance two days later as Flames United was hammered 0–12 by Inter Moengotapoe of Suriname.

Lake again renewed his contract with SV Poortugaal for the 2021–22 Hoofdklasse season.

== International career ==
Lake was first called up to the Sint Maarten national team in March 2019. He qualifies to represent the nation through his Curaçaon father and Sint Maartener mother. He reached out to a representative of the Sint Maarten Soccer Association and was one of approximately thirty players invited to a tryout in the Dutch town of Zeist. He made his first international appearance for the team on 23 March 2019 in a 2019–20 CONCACAF Nations League qualifying match against Saint Martin. He started the match and scored his first two international goals in the eventual 4–3 victory. Lake scored at least one goal in each of his first five matches for Sin Maarten for a total of seven goals over that span.

Following the conclusion of the 2022–23 CONCACAF Nations League, Lake was named to League C's Best XI because of his eight goals scored. This was the highest goal tally of any player in any league of the tournament. Sint Maarten ended the campaign as the winners of Group A and were set to participate in 2023 CONCACAF Gold Cup qualification and the 2023–24 CONCACAF Nations League B.

With 18 international goals, he is Sint Maarten's all-time leading goal scorer.

== Personal life ==
Lake was born in the Netherlands. He is nicknamed "Smally" for his short stature and is known for his speed. He has a brother Gershwin nicknamed "Biggie".

Lake was eligible to represent Sint Maarten through his mother, and he had been previously eligible to represent Anguilla.

Aside from his football career, Lake works in logistics.

== Career statistics ==
=== International ===
As of match played 17 November 2026

Appearances and goals by national team and year
National team	Year	Apps	Goals
Sint Maarten	2019	5	7
Sint Maarten	2022	4	4
Sint Maarten	2023	9	6
Sint Maarten	2024	6	1
Sint Maarten	2025	2	0
Sint Maarten	2026	3	3
Total		29	21

Scores and results list Sint Maarten's goal tally first, score column indicates score after each Lake goal.

List of international goals scored by Gerwin Lake
No.	Date	Venue	Opponent	Score	Result	Competition
1	23 March 2019	Raymond E. Guishard Technical Centre, The Valley, Anguilla	Saint Martin	2–1	4–3	2019–20 CONCACAF Nations League qualifying
2	23 March 2019	Raymond E. Guishard Technical Centre, The Valley, Anguilla	Saint Martin	4–2	4–3	2019–20 CONCACAF Nations League qualifying
3	7 September 2019	Stade René Serge Nabajoth, Les Abymes, Guadeloupe	Guadeloupe	1–4	1–5	2019–20 CONCACAF Nations League C
4	10 October 2019	Ergilio Hato Stadium, Willemstad, Curaçao	Turks and Caicos Islands	1–0	2–5	2019–20 CONCACAF Nations League C
5	10 October 2019	Ergilio Hato Stadium, Willemstad, Curaçao	Turks and Caicos Islands	2–1	2–5	2019–20 CONCACAF Nations League C
6	14 October 2019	Ergilio Hato Stadium, Willemstad, Curaçao	Guadeloupe	1–2	1–2	2019–20 CONCACAF Nations League C
7	14 November 2019	TCIFA National Academy, Providenciales, Turks and Caicos Islands	Turks and Caicos Islands	1–0	2–3	2019–20 CONCACAF Nations League C
8	11 June 2022	Stadion Rignaal 'Jean' Francisca, Willemstad, Curaçao	Turks and Caicos Islands	1–0	8–2	2022–23 CONCACAF Nations League C
9	11 June 2022	Stadion Rignaal 'Jean' Francisca, Willemstad, Curaçao	Turks and Caicos Islands	3–0	8–2	2022–23 CONCACAF Nations League C
10	11 June 2022	Stadion Rignaal 'Jean' Francisca, Willemstad, Curaçao	Turks and Caicos Islands	4–1	8–2	2022–23 CONCACAF Nations League C
11	11 June 2022	Stadion Rignaal 'Jean' Francisca, Willemstad, Curaçao	Turks and Caicos Islands	6–2	8–2	2022–23 CONCACAF Nations League C
12	25 March 2023	Bethlehem Soccer Stadium, Saint Croix, United States Virgin Islands	Bonaire	2–0	6–1	2022–23 CONCACAF Nations League C
13	25 March 2023	Bethlehem Soccer Stadium, Saint Croix, United States Virgin Islands	Bonaire	4–0	6–1	2022–23 CONCACAF Nations League C
14	25 March 2023	Bethlehem Soccer Stadium, Saint Croix, United States Virgin Islands	Bonaire	6–1	6–1	2022–23 CONCACAF Nations League C
15	28 March 2023	Bethlehem Soccer Stadium, Saint Croix, United States Virgin	U.S. Virgin Islands	1–0	2–1	2022–23 CONCACAF Nations League C
16	12 October 2023	Raymond E. Guishard Technical Centre, The Valley, Anguilla	Saint Kitts and Nevis	1–1	2–3	2023–24 CONCACAF Nations League B
17	19 November 2023	Daren Sammy Cricket Ground, Gros Islet, Saint Lucia	Saint Lucia	2–1	2–1	2023–24 CONCACAF Nations League B
18	6 September 2024	Mayagüez Athletics Stadium, Mayagüez, Puerto Rico	Aruba	1–0	2–0	2024–25 CONCACAF Nations League B
19	10 November 2026	Raoul Illidge Sports Complex, Philipsburg, Sint Maarten	Anguilla	5–0	5–1	Friendly
20	14 November 2026	Arnos Vale Stadium, Kingstown, Saint Vincent and the Grenadines	French Guiana	1–0	1–5	2026–27 CONCACAF Nations League B
21	17 November 2026	Arnos Vale Stadium, Kingstown, Saint Vincent and the Grenadines	Belize	1–0	2–1	2026–27 CONCACAF Nations League B

== Honours ==
Individual

- CONCACAF Nations League Top Scorer: 2022–23

== See also ==
- List of top international men's football goalscorers by country
