= Shurandy Reyes =

Sint Maarten footballer

Personal information
- Full name: Shurandy Cedeno Reyes
- Date of birth: 7 October 2001 (age 25)
- Place of birth: Rotterdam, Netherlands
- Height: 1.79 m (5 ft 10 in)
- Position: Defender

Team information
- Current team: SV Charlois

Youth career
- IJVV De Zwervers
- 2020–2022: RV & AV Sparta

Senior career*
Years	Team	Apps	(Gls)
2022–2024	Overmaas RV & AV		
2024–	SV Charlois		

International career^{‡}
2019–	Sint Maarten	2	(0)
- * Club domestic league appearances and goals as of 20:07, 22 November 2024 (UTC) ‡ National team caps and goals as of 20:09, 22 November 2024 (UTC)

Shurandy Cedeno Reyes (born 7 October 2001) is a footballer who plays as a defender for SV Charlois. Born in Netherlands, he represented for the Sint Maarten national team.

== Club career ==
As a youth Reyes played for IJVV De Zwervers. He has played for Overmaas of the Vierde Klasse since at least 2019.

== International career ==
Reyes was called up for two 2019–20 CONCACAF Nations League C matches in October 2019. He was one of four Dutch-based players in the squad. He made his senior international debut on 14 October in the team's match against Guadeloupe.

=== International career statistics ===
As of match played 14 October 2019.

Sint Maarten national team
Year	Apps	Goals
2019	1	0
Total	1	0
