= 2022–23 CONCACAF Nations League C =

Tournament details
- Dates: 2 June 2022 – 28 March 2023
- Teams: 13
- Promoted: Sint Maarten; Saint Kitts and Nevis; Saint Lucia; Puerto Rico

Tournament statistics
- Matches played: 30
- Goals scored: 97 (3.23 per match)
- Top scorer: (Sint Maarten) Gerwin Lake (8 goals)

The 2022–23 CONCACAF Nations League C was the lowest division of the 2022–23 edition of the CONCACAF Nations League, the second season of the international football competition involving the men's national teams of the 41 member associations of CONCACAF. It was held from 2 June 2022 to 28 March 2023.

The top team in each group entered the 2023 CONCACAF Gold Cup qualification tournament.

== Format ==
League C consisted of thirteen teams. The league was split into one group of four teams and three groups of three teams. The teams competed in a home-and-away, round-robin format over the course of the group phase, with matches being played in the official FIFA match windows in June 2022 and March 2023. The first-placed team in each group was promoted to League B and qualified for the 2023 CONCACAF Gold Cup qualification tournament.

=== Team changes ===
The following were the team changes of League C from the 2019–20 season:

Incoming
Relegated from
Nations League B
- Aruba
- Dominica
- Saint Kitts and Nevis
- Saint Lucia

Outgoing
Promoted to
Nations League B
- Bahamas
- Barbados
- Guadeloupe
- Guatemala

=== Seeding ===
The draw for the league phase took place in Miami, Florida, United States on 4 April 2022, 19:00 EDT. Each of the League's draws began by randomly selecting a team from Pot 1 and placing them in Group A of their respective league. The draws continued by selecting the remaining teams from Pot 1 and positioning them into Groups B, C and D in sequential order. The same procedure was done for the remaining pots. Teams were seeded into pots using CONCACAF Ranking.

Pot 1
Team	Pts	Rank
Saint Kitts and Nevis	910	22
Puerto Rico	725	28
Bonaire	718	29
Saint Lucia	709	30

Pot 2
Team	Pts	Rank
Dominica	625	32
Aruba	528	34
Cayman Islands	512	35
Turks and Caicos Islands	448	36

Pot 3
Team	Pts	Rank
Saint Martin	381	37
Sint Maarten	296	38
U.S. Virgin Islands	246	39
Anguilla	218	40
British Virgin Islands	152	41

== Groups ==
The fixture list was confirmed by CONCACAF on 6 April 2022.

All match times are in EDT (UTC−4) as listed by CONCACAF (local times, if different, are in parentheses).

=== Group A ===
Pos	Team	Pld	W	D	L	GF	GA	GD	Pts	Promotion or qualification	(Sint Maarten)	(Bonaire)	(Turks and Caicos Islands)	(United States Virgin Islands)
1	Sint Maarten (P)	6	3	2	1	19	9	+10	11	Promotion and Gold Cup prelims	—	6–1	8–2	1–1
2	Bonaire	6	3	1	2	12	11	+1	10		2–2	—	1–2	2–0
3	Turks and Caicos Islands	6	3	0	3	10	16	−6	9		2–0	1–4	—	1–0
4	U.S. Virgin Islands	6	1	1	4	5	10	−5	4		1–2	0–2	3–2	—

Source: CONCACAF
Rules for classification: Tiebreakers
(P) Promoted
3 June 2022
16:30

Sint Maarten	1–1	U.S. Virgin Islands
Gerritsen 83'	Report	Mack 8'

Stadion Rignaal 'Jean' Francisca, Willemstad (Curaçao)
Referee: Oshane Nation (Jamaica)
3 June 2022
16:30

Turks and Caicos Islands	1–4	Bonaire
Shand 86'	Report	Cicilia 5', 16', 80'; Libania 57'

TCIFA National Academy, Providenciales
Referee: Ken Pennyfeather (Antigua and Barbuda)

6 June 2022
16:00

Bonaire	2–2	Sint Maarten
Libania 9'; Hoeve 18'	Report	Kerssies 27'; Hoeve 32' (o.g.)

Stadion Rignaal 'Jean' Francisca, Willemstad (Curaçao)
Referee: Ricangel de Leça (Aruba)
6 June 2022
16:00

U.S. Virgin Islands	3–2	Turks and Caicos Islands
Browne 19'; Mills 77'; Mack 90+6' (pen.)	Report	Paul 45+3'; Farrell 56' (o.g.)

Bethlehem Soccer Stadium, Saint Croix
Referee: Natalie Simon (United States)

11 June 2022
16:00

U.S. Virgin Islands	0–2	Bonaire
	Report	Cicilia 81'; Isenia 84'

Bethlehem Soccer Stadium, Saint Croix
Referee: Marcos de Oliveira (United States)
11 June 2022
18:00

Sint Maarten	8–2	Turks and Caicos Islands
Lake 2', 18', 44', 65'; Hughes 14', 63'; Gerritsen 68' (pen.); Jacobs 90+4'	Report	Forbes 37', 45+3'

Stadion Rignaal 'Jean' Francisca, Willemstad (Curaçao)
Referee: Óscar Macías (Mexico)

14 June 2022
16:00

Bonaire	2–0	U.S. Virgin Islands
Cicilia 4'; Sonnenschein 33'	Report

Stadion Rignaal 'Jean' Francisca, Willemstad (Curaçao)
Referee: Katia García (Mexico)
14 June 2022
16:30

Turks and Caicos Islands	2–0	Sint Maarten
Paul 48', 70'	Report

TCIFA National Academy, Providenciales
Referee: Myriam Marcotte (Canada)

25 March 2023
15:30

Turks and Caicos Islands	1–0	U.S. Virgin Islands
Beljour 69'	Report

TCIFA National Academy, Providenciales
Referee: Christopher Mason (Jamaica)
25 March 2023
16:00

Sint Maarten	6–1	Bonaire
De Vries 5'; Lake 9', 55', 84' (pen.); Amatkarijo 46'; Illidge 62'	Report	Montero 69'

Bethlehem Soccer Stadium, Saint Croix (U.S. Virgin Islands)
Referee: Nima Saghafi (United States)

28 March 2023
19:00 (Note: The U.S. Virgin Islands v Sint Maarten match, originally scheduled at 16:00 EDT (UTC−4), was re-scheduled to 19:00 EDT.)

U.S. Virgin Islands	1–2	Sint Maarten
Kendall 76'	Report	Lake 58'; Cox 86'

Bethlehem Soccer Stadium, Saint Croix
Referee: Reginald Gumbs (Saint Kitts and Nevis)
28 March 2023
19:00 (Note: The Bonaire v Turks and Caicos Islands match, originally scheduled at 15:00 EDT (UTC−4), was re-scheduled to 19:00 EDT.)

Bonaire	1–2	Turks and Caicos Islands
Montero 2'	Report	Forbes 18', 40'

Stadion Antonio Trenidat, Rincon
Referee: Kwinsi Williams (Trinidad and Tobago)

=== Group B ===
Pos	Team	Pld	W	D	L	GF	GA	GD	Pts	Promotion or qualification	(Saint Kitts and Nevis)	(Aruba)	(Collectivity of Saint Martin)
1	Saint Kitts and Nevis (P)	4	3	1	0	9	4	+5	10	Promotion and Gold Cup prelims	—	2–0	1–1
2	Aruba	4	1	1	2	5	5	0	4		2–3	—	3–0
3	Saint Martin	4	0	2	2	2	7	−5	2		1–3	0–0	—

Source: CONCACAF
Rules for classification: Tiebreakers
(P) Promoted
3 June 2022
16:00

Saint Martin	0–0	Aruba
	Report

Raymond E. Guishard Stadium, The Valley (Anguilla)
Referee: Trevester Richards (Saint Kitts and Nevis)

6 June 2022
19:00

Aruba	3–0	Saint Martin
Groothusen 25', 35'; Maria 45+2'	Report

Stadion Rignaal 'Jean' Francisca, Willemstad (Curaçao)
Referee: Steffon Dewar (Jamaica)

9 June 2022
18:00

Aruba	2–3	Saint Kitts and Nevis
Breinburg 55' (pen.); Jiménez 90+5'	Report	Bertie 6'; Sterling-James 32'; Nelson 83'

Stadion Rignaal 'Jean' Francisca, Willemstad (Curaçao)
Referee: Daneon Parchment (Jamaica)

12 June 2022
19:00

Saint Kitts and Nevis	1–1	Saint Martin
Clarke 90+2'	Report	Arné 34'

Warner Park, Basseterre
Referee: Jaime Herrera (El Salvador)

23 March 2023
16:00

Saint Martin	1–3	Saint Kitts and Nevis
Arné 31'	Report	T. Williams 26'; Sawyers 35'; Panayiotou 89'

Raymond E. Guishard Stadium, The Valley (Anguilla)
Referee: Steffon Dewar (Jamaica)

27 March 2023
18:00

Saint Kitts and Nevis	2–0	Aruba
Freeman 45+1', 80'	Report

Warner Park, Basseterre
Referee: Benjamín Pineda (Costa Rica)

=== Group C ===
Pos	Team	Pld	W	D	L	GF	GA	GD	Pts	Promotion or qualification	(Saint Lucia)	(Anguilla)	(Dominica)
1	Saint Lucia (P)	4	4	0	0	8	2	+6	12	Promotion and Gold Cup prelims	—	2–0	3–1
2	Anguilla	4	0	2	2	2	5	−3	2		1–2	—	0–0
3	Dominica	4	0	2	2	2	5	−3	2		0–1	1–1	—

Source: CONCACAF
Rules for classification: Tiebreakers
(P) Promoted
2 June 2022
16:00

Anguilla	0–0	Dominica
	Report

Raymond E. Guishard Stadium, The Valley
Referee: Tristley Bassue (Saint Kitts and Nevis)

5 June 2022
15:00

Dominica	1–1	Anguilla
Wade 4'	Report	Guishard 57'

Warner Park, Basseterre (Saint Kitts and Nevis)
Referee: Sherwin Johnson (Guyana)

9 June 2022
15:00

Dominica	0–1	Saint Lucia
	Report	MacFarlane 54'

Windsor Park, Roseau
Referee: Odette Hamilton (Jamaica)

12 June 2022
18:00

Saint Lucia	2–0	Anguilla
Remy 44'; Frederick 60'	Report

Daren Sammy Cricket Ground, Gros Islet
Referee: Kwinsi Williams (Trinidad and Tobago)

24 March 2023
15:00

Anguilla	1–2	Saint Lucia
Carpenter 76'	Report	Remy 18'; President 45+2'

Raymond E. Guishard Stadium, The Valley
Referee: Moeth Gaymes (Saint Vincent and the Grenadines)

27 March 2023
19:00

Saint Lucia	3–1	Dominica
President 19'; Frederick 40', 62'	Report	Thomas 84'

Daren Sammy Cricket Ground, Gros Islet
Referee: Myriam Marcotte (Canada)

=== Group D ===
Pos	Team	Pld	W	D	L	GF	GA	GD	Pts	Promotion or qualification	(Puerto Rico)	(Cayman Islands)	(British Virgin Islands)
1	Puerto Rico (P)	4	4	0	0	17	2	+15	12	Promotion and Gold Cup prelims	—	5–1	6–0
2	Cayman Islands	4	0	2	2	3	10	−7	2		0–3	—	1–1
3	British Virgin Islands	4	0	2	2	3	11	−8	2		1–3	1–1	—

Source: CONCACAF
Rules for classification: Tiebreakers
(P) Promoted
3 June 2022
16:00

British Virgin Islands	1–1	Cayman Islands
Caesar 63'	Report	Connolly 82'

A. O. Shirley Recreation Ground, Road Town
Referee: Nima Saghafi (United States)

6 June 2022
18:00 (17:00 UTC−5)

Cayman Islands	1–1	British Virgin Islands
J. Ebanks 25' (pen.)	Report	Wilson 46'

Truman Bodden Sports Complex, George Town
Referee: Rubiel Vazquez (United States)

9 June 2022
18:00 (17:00 UTC−5)

Cayman Islands	0–3	Puerto Rico
	Report	Angking 23', 64' (pen.); Valentin 84'

Truman Bodden Sports Complex, George Town
Referee: Sergio Reyna (Guatemala)

12 June 2022
18:00

Puerto Rico	6–0	British Virgin Islands
Ríos 12'; R. Rivera 15' (pen.), 39', 49', 51'; G. Díaz 31'	Report

Mayagüez Athletics Stadium, Mayagüez
Referee: Germán Martínez (El Salvador)

23 March 2023
15:00

British Virgin Islands	1–3	Puerto Rico
T. Forbes 36' (pen.)	Report	Antonetti 44'; Vega 46'; Silva 90+4'

A. O. Shirley Recreation Ground, Road Town
Referee: Reon Radix (Grenada)

26 March 2023
18:00

Puerto Rico	5–1	Cayman Islands
Rivera 2', 70'; Díaz 40'; Burgos 89', 90+2'	Report	Studenhofft 85'

Estadio Juan Ramón Loubriel, Bayamón
Referee: Katja Koroleva (United States)

== Statistics ==
=== Goalscorers ===
There were 97 goals scored in 30 matches, for an average of 3.23 goals per match.

8 goals

- (Sint Maarten) Gerwin Lake

6 goals

- (Puerto Rico) Ricardo Rivera

5 goals

- (Bonaire) Ayrton Cicilia

4 goals

- (Turks and Caicos Islands) Billy Forbes

3 goals

- (Saint Lucia) Kurt Frederick
- (Turks and Caicos Islands) Junior Paul

2 goals

- (Aruba) Terence Groothusen
- (Bonaire) Jonathan Libania
- (Bonaire) Guillermo Montero
- (Puerto Rico) Isaac Angking
- (Puerto Rico) Joel Burgos
- (Puerto Rico) Gerald Díaz
- (Saint Kitts and Nevis) Keithroy Freeman
- (Saint Lucia) Gregson President
- (Saint Lucia) Andrus Remy
- (Collectivity of Saint Martin) Pierre-Bertrand Arné
- (Sint Maarten) Kay Gerritsen
- (Sint Maarten) Sergio Hughes
- (United States Virgin Islands) J. C. Mack

1 goal

- (Anguilla) Lamar Carpenter
- (Anguilla) Jonathan Guishard
- (Aruba) Gregor Breinburg
- (Aruba) Javier Jiménez
- (Aruba) Benjamin Maria
- (Bonaire) Quincy Hoeve
- (Bonaire) Christopher Isenia
- (Bonaire) Berry Sonnenschein
- (British Virgin Islands) Troy Caesar
- (British Virgin Islands) Tyler Forbes
- (British Virgin Islands) Jamie Wilson
- (Cayman Islands) Syrus Connolly
- (Cayman Islands) Jonah Ebanks
- (Cayman Islands) Gunnar Studenhofft
- (Dominica) Briel Thomas
- (Dominica) Julian Wade
- (Puerto Rico) Leandro Antonetti
- (Puerto Rico) Darren Ríos
- (Puerto Rico) Ian Silva
- (Puerto Rico) Zarek Valentin
- (Puerto Rico) Devin Vega
- (Saint Kitts and Nevis) Carlos Bertie
- (Saint Kitts and Nevis) Kalonji Clarke
- (Saint Kitts and Nevis) Vinceroy Nelson
- (Saint Kitts and Nevis) Harry Panayiotou
- (Saint Kitts and Nevis) Romaine Sawyers
- (Saint Kitts and Nevis) Omari Sterling-James
- (Saint Kitts and Nevis) Tiquanny Williams
- (Saint Lucia) Jevick MacFarlane
- (Sint Maarten) Chovanie Amatkarijo
- (Sint Maarten) Jeroen Cox
- (Sint Maarten) Elmer de Vries
- (Sint Maarten) T-Shawn Illidge
- (Sint Maarten) Kymani Jacobs
- (Sint Maarten) Ties Kerssies
- (Turks and Caicos Islands) Jeff Beljour
- (Turks and Caicos Islands) Karl Shand
- (United States Virgin Islands) Jamie Browne
- (United States Virgin Islands) Karson Kendall
- (United States Virgin Islands) Orion Mills

1 own goal

- (Bonaire) Quincy Hoeve (against Sint Maarten)
- (United States Virgin Islands) Quinn Farrell (against Turks and Caicos Islands)

=== Best XI ===
CONCACAF announced the following squad as the best eleven of League C after the conclusion of the competition.

Goalkeeper	Defenders	Midfielders	Forwards
(United States Virgin Islands) Ramius Stiehler	(Puerto Rico) Sidney Paris (Sint Maarten) Mitchell de Nooijer (Saint Lucia) Kurt Frederick	(Saint Lucia) Gregson President (Sint Maarten) Oliver Hobgood (Puerto Rico) Devin Vega (Turks and Caicos Islands) Jeff Beljour	(Sint Maarten) Gerwin Lake (Turks and Caicos Islands) Billy Forbes (Saint Kitts and Nevis) Keithroy Freeman
