= Gregor Breinburg =

Aruban footballer

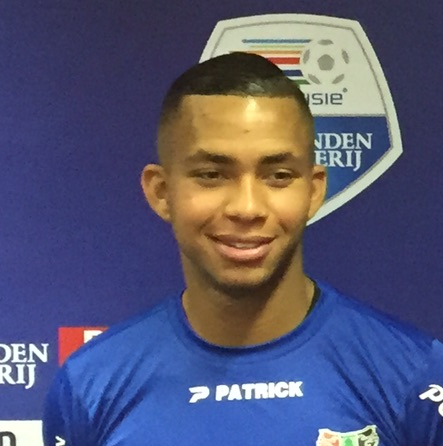

Personal information
- Full name: Gregor Flanegin Breinburg
- Date of birth: 16 September 1991 (age 35)
- Place of birth: Arnhem, Netherlands
- Height: 1.75 m (5 ft 9 in)
- Position: Midfielder

Youth career
- Vitesse 1892
- De Graafschap

Senior career*
Years	Team	Apps	(Gls)
2011–2014	De Graafschap	92	(0)
2014–2018	NEC	129	(3)
2018–2019	Sparta	19	(0)
2019–2020	De Graafschap	24	(2)
2021–2023	ADO Den Haag	45	(0)

International career^{‡}
2015–2022	Aruba	15	(2)
- * Club domestic league appearances and goals as of 20 June 2023 ‡ National team caps and goals as of 25 September 2021

Gregor Breinburg (born 16 September 1991) is a retired footballer who played as a midfielder. Born in the Netherlands, he played for the Aruba national team.

== Club career ==
He formerly played for De Graafschap and joined NEC in 2014. After a solid 2015 season, he was appointed captain of NEC at the start of the 2016 season.

After retiring, he became a player's agent and played football for amateur side Elsweide in Arnhem.

== International career ==
Breinburg made his debut for Aruba in a June 2015 FIFA World Cup qualification match against Barbados and has, as of October 2022, earned a total of 15 caps scoring 2 goals. He represented his country in 4 World Cup qualifiers.

== Career statistics ==
=== Club ===
As of match played 17 June 2023

Appearances and goals by club, season and competition
Club	Season	League			KNVB Cup		Other		Total	
Club	Season	Division	Apps	Goals	Apps	Goals	Apps	Goals	Apps	Goals
De Graafschap	2010–11	Eredivisie	7	0	1	0	—		8	0
De Graafschap	2011–12	Eredivisie	25	0	2	0	—		27	0
De Graafschap	2012–13	Eerste Divisie	27	0	1	0	4	0	32	0
De Graafschap	2013–14	Eerste Divisie	33	0	0	0	4	0	37	0
De Graafschap	Total		92	0	4	0	8	0	104	0
NEC Nijmegen	2014–15	Eerste Divisie	30	0	3	0	—		33	0
NEC Nijmegen	2015–16	Eredivisie	30	0	3	2	—		33	2
NEC Nijmegen	2016–17	Eredivisie	33	2	1	1	4	2	38	5
NEC Nijmegen	2017–18	Eerste Divisie	36	1	2	0	2	0	40	1
NEC Nijmegen	Total		129	3	9	3	6	2	144	8
Sparta Rotterdam	2018–19	Eerste Divisie	19	0	1	0	0	0	20	0
De Graafschap	2019–20	Eerste Divisie	24	2	1	0	—		25	2
ADO Den Haag	2021–22	Eerste Divisie	22	0	0	0	3	0	25	0
ADO Den Haag	2022-23	Eerste Divisie	23	0	2	0	0	0	25	0
ADO Den Haag	Total		45	0	2	0	3	0	50	0
Career total			309	5	16	3	17	2	342	9

=== International ===
Appearances and goals by national team and year
National team	Year	Apps	Goals
Aruba	2015	4	0
Aruba	2016	1	0
Aruba	2018	1	0
Aruba	2019	7	1
Aruba	2022	2	1
Total		15	2

Scores and results list Aruba's goal tally first, score column indicates score after each Breinburg goal.

List of international goals scored by Gregor Breinburg
No.	Date	Venue	Opponent	Score	Result	Competition	Ref.
1	15 November 2019	Synthetic Track and Field Facility, Leonora, Guyana	Guyana	2–1	2–4	2019–20 CONCACAF Nations League B	
2	15 June 2022	Stadion Rignaal 'Jean' Francisca, Willemstad, Curacao	Saint Kitts and Nevis	1-2	2–3	2022-23 CONCACAF Nations League C	
