= Karson Kendall =

US Virgin Islands association footballer

Personal information
- Date of birth: April 1, 2000 (age 26)
- Place of birth: Phoenix, Arizona, United States
- Height: 6 ft 3 in (1.91 m)
- Position: Defender

Team information
- Current team: Kings Hammer FC
- Number: 5

Youth career
- 2015–2018: Sporting Kansas City

College career
Years	Team	Apps	(Gls)
2019–	High Point University Panthers	59	(2)

Senior career*
Years	Team	Apps	(Gls)
2019	North Carolina Fusion U23	2	(0)
2021–2022	Kings Hammer FC	21	(1)

International career^{‡}
2016–	United States Virgin Islands	10	(1)
- * Club domestic league appearances and goals as of 00:07, June 4, 2021 (UTC) ‡ National team caps and goals as of 00:35, 29 March 2023 (UTC)

Karson Kendall (born April 1, 2000) is a United States Virgin Islands international soccer player who currently plays for Kings Hammer FC of the USL League Two.

== Club career ==
From 2015 to 2018 Kendall played for the youth academy teams of Sporting Kansas City of Major League Soccer. In 2019 he made two league appearances for North Carolina Fusion U23 of USL League Two. For the 2021 season Kendall returned to the USL League Two, signing for Kings Hammer FC.

== International career ==
=== International goals ===
Scores and results list USVI's goal tally first.

No.	Date	Venue	Opponent	Score	Result	Competition
1.	28 March 2023	Bethlehem Soccer Stadium, Saint Croix, US Virgin Islands	Sint Maarten	1–1	1–2	2022–23 CONCACAF Nations League C
Last updated 28 March 2023

== Career statistics ==
As of match played 2 June 2021.

Appearances and goals by national team and year
National team	Year	Apps	Goals
United States Virgin Islands	2016	1	0
United States Virgin Islands	2017	0	0
United States Virgin Islands	2018	0	0
United States Virgin Islands	2019	1	0
United States Virgin Islands	2020	0	0
United States Virgin Islands	2021	1	0
Total		3	0
