= Joost Röben =

Personal information
- Place of birth: Epe, Netherlands
- Position: Forward

Team information
- Current team: Flames United

Senior career*
Years	Team	Apps	(Gls)
2013–2014	SV Independiente Caravel		
2016–	Flames United		

International career^{‡}
2016–	Sint Maarten	3	(2)
- * Club domestic league appearances and goals as of 20:43, 14 March 2016 (UTC) ‡ National team caps and goals as of 12:57, 23 March 2016 (UTC)

Joost Röben is a St. Maartener international footballer who plays as a forward.

== Club career ==
In 2013, Röben signed for SV Independiente Caravel of the Division Uno, the second tier of football on Aruba, shortly after arriving on the island from the Netherlands. On the penultimate matchday of the season, Röben scored two goals in a 3–1 victory over Racing Club Savaneta to guarantee Caravel's first-place league finish and return to the Division di Honor for the following season.

== International career ==
Röben made his international debut for Sint Maarten in a friendly against Anguilla on 13 March 2016. He scored his first two international goals in the eventual 2–0 victory. The match was Sint Maarten's first senior international in over ten years and was played in preparation for each side's 2017 Caribbean Cup qualification campaigns which were set to begin the following week.

=== International goals ===
Scores and results list Sint Maarten's goal tally first.

#	Date	Venue	Opponent	Score	Result	Competition
1.	13 March 2016	Raoul Illidge Sports Complex, Philipsburg, Sint Maarten	Anguilla	1–0	2–0	Friendly
2.	13 March 2016	Raoul Illidge Sports Complex, Philipsburg, Sint Maarten	Anguilla	2–0	2–0	Friendly
Last updated 23 March 2016

=== International career statistics ===
As of match played 22 March 2016.

Sint Maarten national team
Year	Apps	Goals
2016	3	2
Total	3	2

== Personal ==
Röben is from the town of Epe, Netherlands.
