= Oliver Hobgood =

Sint Maarten footballer

Personal information
- Full name: Oliver Noel Hobgood
- Date of birth: 1 July 2004 (age 22)
- Place of birth: Philipsburg, Sint Maarten
- Height: 1.77 m (5 ft 10 in)
- Position: Midfielder

Team information
- Current team: Dunstable

Youth career
- 2017–2023: Herning Fremad
- 2023–2024: Aarhus Fremad
- 2024–: Dunstable

International career^{‡}
Years	Team	Apps	(Gls)
2023–	Sint Maarten	16	(0)
- ‡ National team caps and goals as of 19:43, 22 November 2024 (UTC)

Oliver Hobgood (born 1 July 2004) is a Sint Maartener footballer who plays as a midfielder for Dunstable and the Sint Maarten national team.

== Club career ==
As a youth, Hobgood played for Learning Unlimited Goal Machines of the Interscholastic Soccer Tournament. In 2015 he registered five goals and an assist in a victory over Leonald Connor School. He and the club went on to win the under-11 division that year. Hobgood tallied a goal and two assists in the 7–2 victory over Sr. Regina Goal Getters in the final.

Hobgood moved to Herning, Denmark to live with his mother who comes from the country after Hurricane Irma struck Sint Maarten in 2017. He began playing for local club BK Herning Fremad. He eventually returned to Sint Maarten before going back to Denmark and his former club in 2021.

Following a match against Brande IF in September 2022, Herning Fremad manager Jesper "Pinkii" Christensen said, "Oliver Hobgood from U19, was the player of the match again, again, again for us. Together with Sebastian Sig in the middle, he is simply worth his weight in gold."

For the 2023/2024 season, Hobgood joined Aarhus Fremad where he joined the reserve side playing in the Denmark Series.

== International career ==
Hobgood is eligible to play for Sint Maarten as he was born and raised on the island. He received his first national team call-up at age 13. In 2016 he traveled with the U13 national team to Saint Barthélemy to compete against the national teams of Saint Martin, Guadeloupe, and Saint Barthélemy in addition to academy teams of Portugal's Benfica and Bordeaux of France. The following year, Hobgood was selected to the under-13 squad again for the Torneo Internacional Himno Y Bandera in Aruba. Bonaire, Curacao, Colombia, and Venezuela also took part in the tournament.

He also appeared for Sint Maarten at the youth level in the 2019 CONCACAF Boys' Under-15 Championship and 2022 CONCACAF U-20 Championship qualifying. In the former, he scored in a 4–0 victory over Anguilla. In preparation for the tournament, Hobgood scored in a friendly against the US Virgin Islands in the eventual 1–5 defeat to the hosts.

Hobgood was called up to the Sint Maarten senior national team in March 2023 for 2022–23 CONCACAF Nations League C matches against Bonaire and the US Virgin Islands. He made his senior debut on 25 March 2023 in the match against Bonaire. At the conclusion of League C, Hobgood was named to the League XI after completing 91 percent of his passes and adding an assist in addition to his defensive play.

== Career statistics ==
As of match played 9 September 2024

Appearances and goals by national team and year
National team	Year	Apps	Goals
Sint Maarten	2023	9	0
Sint Maarten	2024	3	0
Total		12	0
