= Raymond Wolff =

Dutch footballer (born 1987)

Personal information
- Date of birth: 30 January 1987 (age 39)
- Place of birth: Vlissingen, Netherlands
- Position: Midfielder

Team information
- Current team: RISC Takers FC

Senior career*
Years	Team	Apps	(Gls)
–2010	VC Vlissingen		
2011–2013	HSV Hoek		
2013–2014	VV GOES		
2014–2015	VC Vlissingen		
2015–	RISC Takers FC		

International career^{‡}
2016–	Sint Maarten	2	(0)
- * Club domestic league appearances and goals as of 20:46, 18 March 2016 (UTC) ‡ National team caps and goals as of 12:58, 23 March 2016 (UTC)

Raymond Wolff (born 30 January 1987) is a St. Maartener international footballer who plays as a midfielder for RISC Takers FC of the Sint Maarten Futsal League, and Sint Maarten.

== Club career ==
Wolff has played for RCS, Sparta, VV GOES, HSV Hoek, and VC Vlissingen in his native Netherlands. He played for VC Vlissingen until 2010. In March of that year, became the first player on the team to score two goals in a single match during that season. He appeared in a KNVB Cup match against RKVV EVV ECHT while with Hoek in 2011. The match ended in a 5–3 defeat. He played for HSV Hoek between 2011 and 2013 until he joined VV GOES.

Wolff returned to VC Vlissingen in 2014. During Wolff's final season with the club, he sustained a groin injury in a Cup loss to his former club HSV Hoek, marking the final cup match he would play with Vlissingen. He played his final league match for the club on 11 June 2015 in a 3–1 defeat to HBS Craeyenhout. A victory would have seen the club promoted to the Topklasse, the third tier of Football in the Netherlands. While with Vlissingen, Wolff played as a striker.

After immigrating to Sint Maarten, he joined RISC Takers FC of the country's futsal league.

== International career ==
Wolf first represented Sint Maarten internationally during the 2016 CFU Futsal Championship. He scored three goals in three matches as Sint Maarten finished third in its group. Two of his goals came in a 3–2 upset victory over Jamaica. The third goal was scored by Rick De Punder who immigrated to Sint Maarten along with Wolff.

Wolff made his international football debut for Sint Maarten in a friendly against Anguilla on 13 March 2016. The match was Sint Maarten's first senior international in over ten years and was played in preparation for each side's 2017 Caribbean Cup qualification campaigns which were set to begin the following week. Wolf made his competitive debut for Sint Maarten on 22 March 2016 in the team's first match against Grenada. He helped the team maintain a scoreless draw in the first half before being substituted after sustaining a broken rib.

== Personal life ==
In 2015, Wolff immigrated to Sint Maarten from the Netherlands to be with his girlfriend who had previously moved there.

== Career statistics ==
As of match played 22 March 2016.

Sint Maarten national team
Year	Apps	Goals
2016	2	0
Total	2	0
