= Remsley Boelijn =

Curacaoan association football player

Personal information
- Full name: Remsley Shairon Boelijn
- Date of birth: 23 February 1995 (age 31)
- Place of birth: Willemstad, Curaçao
- Height: 1.70 m (5 ft 7 in)
- Position: Winger

Team information
- Current team: SUBT
- Number: 11

Youth career
- RKSV Centro Dominguito
- ASC St. Louis Stars
- SV Quick 60

Senior career*
| Years | Team | Apps | (Gls) |
| 2011–2016 | ASC St. Louis Stars | | |
| 2016–2018 | RKSV Scherpenheuvel | | |
| 2018– | SUBT | 60 | (14) |

International career^{‡}
| 2016– | Sint Maarten | 10 | (3) |
- * Club domestic league appearances and goals ‡ National team caps and goals as of 23:47, 14 November 2019 (UTC)

Remsley Boelijn (born 23 February 1995) is a Curaçaoan footballer who plays for SUBT of the Curaçao Sekshon Pagá, and the Sint Maarten national team.

== Club career ==
From 2006 to 2008 Boelijn played for RKSV Centro Dominguito youth team before being transferred to Quick'60 from 2008 to 2010. From 2011 to 2016, Boelijn played for ASC St. Louis Stars in the Saint-Martin Championships. In 2016, he transferred to RKSV Scherpenheuvel of the Curaçao Sekshon Pagá, the top football league in Curaçao. Now (2017- he is transferred to SUBT of the Curaçao Sekshon Pagá

== International career ==
Boelijn made his international debut for Sint Maarten on 22 March 2016 in a 2017 Caribbean Cup qualification match against Grenada. He scored his first international goal in the team's next match, a 1–2 defeat to the United States Virgin Islands. These two matches were Sint Maarten's first competitive matches in 19 years.

=== International goals ===
Scores and results list Sint Maartens's goal tally first.

| # | Date | Venue | Opponent | Score | Result | Competition |
|---|---|---|---|---|---|---|
| 1. | 26 March 2016 | Raoul Illidge Sports Complex, Philipsburg, Sint Maarten | U.S. Virgin Islands | 1–2 | 1–2 | 2017 Caribbean Cup qualification |
| 2. | 23 March 2019 | Raymond E. Guishard Technical Centre, The Valley, Anguilla | Saint Martin | 3–1 | 4–3 | 2019–20 CONCACAF Nations League qualification |
| 3. | 14 November 2019 | TCIFA National Academy, Providenciales, Turks and Caicos Islands | Turks and Caicos Islands | 2–1 | 2–3 | 2019–20 CONCACAF Nations League C |

=== International career statistics ===
As of match played 14 November 2019.

Sint Maarten national team
| Year | Apps | Goals |
|---|---|---|
| 2016 | 2 | 1 |
| 2017 | 0 | 0 |
| 2018 | 3 | 0 |
| 2019 | 5 | 2 |
| Total | 10 | 3 |
