= Javier Jiménez (footballer, born 2000) =

Aruban footballer

Personal information
- Full name: Javier Alejandro Jiménez Paris
- Date of birth: 27 May 2000 (age 26)
- Place of birth: Oranjestad, Aruba
- Height: 1.83 m (6 ft 0 in)
- Position: Forward

Team information
- Current team: BSV Schwarz-Weiß Rehden
- Number: 11

Senior career*
Years	Team	Apps	(Gls)
2016–2019	Deportivo Nacional		(5)
2019–2020	Rabat Ajax	5	(1)
2020–2021	Brandenburg 03	6	(0)
2021–2022	BSC Süd	28	(6)
2022–2023	SC Staaken	20	(6)
2023–2025	TSG Neustrelitz	26	(3)
2025–	BSV Schwarz-Weiß Rehden	7	(1)

International career^{‡}
2018	Aruba U20	5	(0)
2019–	Aruba	16	(2)
- * Club domestic league appearances and goals as of 20:55, 22 June 2025 (UTC) ‡ National team caps and goals as of 20:55, 22 June 2025 (UTC)

Javier Alejandro Jiménez Paris (born 27 May 2000) is an Aruban professional footballer who plays as a forward for BSV Schwarz-Weiß Rehden.

== Career statistics ==
=== Club ===
As of 26 March 2021.

Club	Season	League			Cup		Other		Total	
Club	Season	Division	Apps	Goals	Apps	Goals	Apps	Goals	Apps	Goals
Brandenburg 03	2020–21	Berlin-Liga	6	0	0	0	1 (Note: Appearances in the AOK Pokal)	0	7	0
BSC Süd	2020–21	NOFV-Oberliga	0	0	0	0	0	0	0	0
Career total			6	0	0	0	1	0	7	0

=== International ===
As of matches played 11 November 2020.

National team	Year	Apps	Goals
Aruba	2019	1	0
Total		1	0
