= Kay Gerritsen =

Sint Maarten footballer

Personal information
- Date of birth: 25 April 1997 (age 29)
- Place of birth: Netherlands
- Position: Midfielder

Team information
- Current team: DSOV

Youth career
- 2008–2009: FC VVC
- 2009–2017: Lisse

Senior career*
Years	Team	Apps	(Gls)
2017–2019	Lisse	2	(0)
2019–	DSOV		

International career^{‡}
2019–	Sint Maarten	24	(2)
- * Club domestic league appearances and goals as of 18:55, 22 November 2024 (UTC) ‡ National team caps and goals as of 18:47, 22 November 2024 (UTC)

Kay Gerritsen (born 25 April 1997) is a footballer who plays as a midfielder for DSOV. Born in Netherlands, he represented for the Sint Maarten national team.

== Club career ==
Gerritsen began his career at FC VVC in Nieuw-Vennep where he stayed for a year and a half before joining FC Lisse. He played for Lisse through every youth level. He was promoted from the "B" to "A" team for the 2017–18 season. As part of preparation for the season, Gerritsen appeared in a friendly against Feyenoord. He made his league debut for the club on 3 February 2018 in a 3–0 victory over Achilles '29. After only one season with the first team, it was announced that the player would leave the club at the end of the season in hopes of earning more playing time at another club. In total, he spent over eight years with the club.

On 18 March 2019, it was announced that Gerritsen would join DSOV of the Eerste Klasse.

== International career ==
Gerritsen was first called up to the Sint Maarten national team in March 2019. He qualifies to represent the nation through his Dutch citizenship and spending two years on the island as a child before returning to the Netherlands. He made his first international appearance for the team on 23 March 2019 in a 2019–20 CONCACAF Nations League qualifying match against Saint Martin. He started the match and played the full ninety minutes in the eventual 4–3 victory, providing an assist on one of Sint Maarten's goals.

=== International goals ===
Scores and results list Sint Maarten's goal tally first.

No.	Date	Venue	Opponent	Score	Result	Competition
1.	3 June 2022	Stadion Rignaal 'Jean' Francisca, Willemstad, Curaçao	U.S. Virgin Islands	1–1	1–1	2022–23 CONCACAF Nations League C
2.	11 June 2022	Stadion Rignaal 'Jean' Francisca, Willemstad, Curaçao	Turks and Caicos Islands	7–2	8–2	2022–23 CONCACAF Nations League C
Last updated 3 July 2022

=== International career statistics ===
As of match played 14 June 2022.

Sint Maarten
Year	Apps	Goals
2019	4	0
2020	0	0
2021	0	0
2022	3	2
Total	7	2
