= 1989 Caribbean Cup =

Shell Caribbean Cup

Tournament details
- Host country: Barbados
- Dates: 2–9 July 1989
- Teams: 6

Final positions
- Champions: Trinidad and Tobago (1st title)
- Runners-up: Grenada

Tournament statistics
- Matches played: 7
- Goals scored: 15 (2.14 per match)

The 1989 Caribbean Cup, known as the Shell Caribbean Cup for sponsorship reasons, was the seventh international association football championship for members of the Caribbean Football Union (CFU). It was the inaugural edition of the Caribbean Cup which replaced the CFU Championship. Hosted by Barbados, the competition ran from 2–9 July 1989 and was contested by the national teams of Barbados, Grenada, Guadeloupe, Netherlands Antilles, Saint Vincent and the Grenadines and Trinidad and Tobago.

The final tournament began with the first matches in the group stage on 2 July 1989 and ended with the final on 9 July 1989. Trinidad and Tobago defeated Grenada 2–1 in the final to win the competition for the first time.

== Background ==
The Caribbean Football Union (CFU) was founded in January 1978 as a sub-confederation of the Confederation of North, Central America and Caribbean Association Football (CONCACAF). Later the same year, the first CFU Championship was organised in Trinidad and Tobago. The competition was held semi-regularly until the final edition in 1988. Of the six editions held, Martinique and Trinidad and Tobago were the most successful teams after both winning the competition twice. From 1989, it was replaced by the Caribbean Cup.

The tournament was sponsored by Royal Dutch Shell following the input of employees of Shell Antilles and Gulanas Ltd. Barbados was selected as the host of the competition as Shell, based in Barbados, felt that it was better suited to host the tournament as the island nation had an international airport.

== Format ==
A qualifying tournament was held to determine five of the six teams that would participate in the final tournament. Hosts Barbados qualified automatically. The 16 competing teams were drawn into three groups of five or six teams. Each group was played as a single round-robin where each team would play all of the others once. The winner of each group plus the two runners-up with the best record would qualify for the final tournament.

For the final tournament, the six teams were drawn into two groups of three teams. Each group was played as a single round-robin where each team would play all of the others once. The winner of each group would contest the final.

=== Participants ===
- Antigua and Barbuda
- Aruba
- Barbados
- British Virgin Islands
- Dominica
- French Guiana
- Guadeloupe
- Grenada
- Guyana
- Jamaica
- Martinique
- Netherlands Antilles
- Saint Kitts and Nevis
- Saint Lucia
- Saint Vincent and the Grenadines
- Sint Maarten
- Trinidad and Tobago

== Qualifying tournament ==
Guyana were disqualified from the qualifying tournament due to non-payment of fines owed to FIFA.

=== Group A ===
Qualifying group A was played between 23 April and 30 June 1989. Grenada qualified as group winners after defeating French Guiana in their final match. Trinidad and Tobago qualified as one of the two best runners-up.

==== Table ====
Pos	Team	Pld	W	D	L	GF	GA	GD	Pts	Qualification
1	Grenada (Note: Grenada defeated French Guiana but the exact score unknown. No goals from the match have been included in the table.)	4	3	1	0	3	1	+2	7	Qualification to 1989 Caribbean Cup
2	Trinidad and Tobago	4	3	0	1	16	2	+14	6	Qualification to 1989 Caribbean Cup
3	Saint Kitts and Nevis	4	2	0	2	6	5	+1	4	
4	French Guiana	4	1	0	3	5	4	+1	2	
5	Aruba	4	0	1	3	1	19	−18	1	

==== Results ====
23 April 1989

Trinidad and Tobago	11–0	Aruba
Allen 9', 23', 34', 60'; Haynes 12', 50'; Fraser 25', 53', 75', 85'; de Silva 40'

Municipal Stadium, Arima
23 April 1989

Saint Kitts and Nevis	1–0	French Guiana
Thompson 62'

Warner Park, Basseterre

7 May 1989

Grenada	2–1	Saint Kitts and Nevis

Queen's Park, St. George's
10 May 1989

French Guiana	1–3	Trinidad and Tobago
Goal		Denoon; Fraser; De Silva

Stade de Baduel, Cayenne

21 May 1989

Aruba	0–0	Grenada

Wilhelminastadion, Oranjestad
21 May 1989

Saint Kitts and Nevis	0–2	Trinidad and Tobago

Warner Park, Basseterre

6 June 1989

Grenada	1–0	Trinidad and Tobago

Queen's Park, St. George's
8 June 1989

French Guiana	4–0	Aruba

Stade de Baduel, Cayenne

18 June 1989

Aruba	1–4	Saint Kitts and Nevis

Wilhelminastadion, Oranjestad
30 June 1989

Grenada	+:–	French Guiana

Queen's Park, St. George's

Grenada defeated French Guiana but the score is unknown.

=== Group B ===
Qualifying group B was played between 23 April and 19 June 1989. Saint Vincent and the Grenadines qualified as group winners after defeating the British Virgin Islands 2–0 in their final match. The Netherlands Antilles qualified as one of the two best runners-up.

==== Table ====
Pos	Team	Pld	W	D	L	GF	GA	GD	Pts	Qualification
1	Saint Vincent and the Grenadines	4	3	1	0	11	3	+8	7	Qualification to 1989 Caribbean Cup
2	Netherlands Antilles	4	3	0	1	11	5	+6	6	Qualification to 1989 Caribbean Cup
3	Martinique (Note: Martinique defeated the British Virgin Islands but the exact score unknown. No goals from the match have been included in the table.)	4	2	1	1	11	3	+8	5	
4	British Virgin Islands	4	1	0	3	2	7	−5	2	
5	Sint Maarten	4	0	0	4	3	20	−17	0	

==== Results ====
23 April 1989

Saint Vincent and the Grenadines	6–1	Sint Maarten

Arnos Vale Stadium, Arnos Vale
26 April 1989

Netherlands Antilles	3–1	Martinique

Ergilio Hato Stadium, Willemstad

7 May 1989

Sint Maarten	1–2	British Virgin Islands

Raoul Illidge Sports Complex, Philipsburg
10 May 1989

Martinique	0–0	Saint Vincent and the Grenadines

Stade d'Honneur de Dillon, Fort-de-France

21 May 1989

Saint Vincent and the Grenadines	3–2	Netherlands Antilles

Arnos Vale Stadium, Arnos Vale
21 May 1989

Martinique	+:–	British Virgin Islands

Stade d'Honneur de Dillon, Fort-de-France

Martinique defeated the British Virgin Islands but the score is unknown.

7 June 1989

Netherlands Antilles	4–0	British Virgin Islands

Ergilio Hato Stadium, Willemstad
7 June 1989

Martinique	10–0	Sint Maarten

Stade d'Honneur de Dillon, Fort-de-France

18 June 1989

Sint Maarten	1–2	Netherlands Antilles

Raoul Illidge Sports Complex, Philipsburg
19 June 1989

Saint Vincent and the Grenadines	2–0	British Virgin Islands

Arnos Vale Stadium, Arnos Vale

=== Group C ===
Qualifying group C was played between 23 April and 18 June 1989. A number of results are unknown but the final standings, without goals for and against, is known. Guadeloupe qualified as group winners on goal difference.

==== Table ====
Pos	Team	Pld	W	D	L	GF	GA	GD	Pts	Qualification
1	Guadeloupe	4	3	0	1	?	?	—	6 (Note: Guadeloupe won the group on goal-difference, while Antigua and Barbuda was eliminated as the worst runner-up. Both teams had three wins and one defeat.)	Qualification to 1989 Caribbean Cup
2	Antigua and Barbuda	4	3	0	1	?	?	—	6	
3	Saint Lucia	4	2	1	1	?	?	—	5	
4	Jamaica	4	0	2	2	2	6	−4	2	
5	Dominica	4	0	1	3	?	?	—	1	

==== Results ====
23 April 1989

Antigua and Barbuda	1–0	Jamaica
Gonsalves 22'

Antigua Recreation Ground, St. John's
23 April 1989

Saint Lucia	2–0	Dominica

Mindoo Phillip Park, Castries

7 May 1989

Jamaica	1–3	Guadeloupe

National Stadium, Kingston
13 May 1989

Dominica	0–1	Antigua and Barbuda

Windsor Park, Roseau

21 May 1989

Antigua and Barbuda	Unknown	Saint Lucia

Antigua Recreation Ground, St. John's
21 May 1989

Guadeloupe	+:–	Dominica

Stade de Les Abymes, Les Abymes

Guadeloupe defeated Dominica but the score is unknown.

June 1989

Saint Lucia	Unknown	Guadeloupe

Mindoo Phillip Park, Castries
4 June 1989

Dominica	0–0	Jamaica

Windsor Park, Roseau

June 1989

Guadeloupe	Unknown	Antigua and Barbuda

Stade de Les Abymes, Les Abymes
18 June 1989

Jamaica	1–1	Saint Lucia
Young 85'		Hippolyte 56'

National Stadium, Kingston

=== Ranking of second-placed teams ===
Grp	Team	Pld	W	D	L	GF	GA	GD	Pts	Qualification
B	Netherlands Antilles	4	3	0	1	21	4	+17	6	Qualification to 1989 Caribbean Cup
A	Trinidad and Tobago	4	3	0	1	16	4	+12	6	Qualification to 1989 Caribbean Cup
C	Antigua and Barbuda	4	3	0	1	?	?	—	6	

== Final tournament ==
=== Group stage ===
==== Group A ====
In group A, all three teams ended the round-robin with a record of one win and one defeat. Trinidad and Tobago advanced to the final on goals scored ahead of Guadeloupe.

===== Table =====
Pos	Team	Pld	W	D	L	GF	GA	GD	Pts	Qualification
1	Trinidad and Tobago	2	1	0	1	3	2	+1	2	Advance to final
2	Guadeloupe	2	1	0	1	2	1	+1	2	
3	Barbados	2	1	0	1	1	3	−2	2	

===== Results =====
3 July 1989

Barbados	1–0	Guadeloupe

National Stadium, Bridgetown

5 July 1989

Barbados	0–3	Trinidad and Tobago
		Jones (x2); Morris

National Stadium, Bridgetown

7 July 1989

Trinidad and Tobago	0–2	Guadeloupe

National Stadium, Bridgetown

==== Group B ====
In group B, Grenada advanced to the final after a 1–1 draw with Netherlands Antilles in their final match secure them first place in the group.

===== Table =====
Pos	Team	Pld	W	D	L	GF	GA	GD	Pts	Qualification
1	Grenada	2	1	1	0	3	1	+2	3	Advance to final
2	Netherlands Antilles	2	0	2	0	2	2	0	2	
3	Saint Vincent and the Grenadines	2	0	1	1	1	3	−2	1	

===== Results =====
2 July 1989

Grenada	2–0	Saint Vincent and the Grenadines
Joseph 17' (pen.); Drayton 54'

National Stadium, Bridgetown

4 July 1989

Netherlands Antilles	1–1	Saint Vincent and the Grenadines

National Stadium, Bridgetown

6 July 1989

Grenada	1–1	Netherlands Antilles

National Stadium, Bridgetown

=== Final ===
A brace from Dwight Yorke helped Trinidad and Tobago to a 2–1 against Grenada as they won the inaugural Caribbean Cup.

9 July 1989

Trinidad and Tobago	2–1	Grenada
Yorke 24', 89'		Hood 84'

National Stadium, Bridgetown

== Prize money ==
The following prize money was awarded to competing teams:

- Winner: $10,000
- Runner-up: $5,000
- Third-place: $4,000
- Fourth-place: $3,000
