= Sergio Hughes =

Sint Maarten footballer

Personal information
- Full name: Sergio Mariano Mervin Hughes
- Date of birth: 24 February 2002 (age 24)
- Place of birth: Rotterdam, Netherlands
- Positions: Left back; left winger

Team information
- Current team: Poortugaal

Youth career
- –2016: IJVV De Zwervers
- 2016–2019: Vitesse
- 2019–2020: NEC

Senior career*
Years	Team	Apps	(Gls)
2020–2022	NEC II	7	(0)
2022–2024	Kozakken Boys	3	(0)
2024–2026	XerxesDZB		
2026–	Poortugaal		

International career^{‡}
2022–	Sint Maarten	23	(2)
- * Club domestic league appearances and goals as of 18:15, 22 November 2024 (UTC) ‡ National team caps and goals as of 15 October 2026

Sergio Mariano Mervin Hughes (born 24 February 2002) is a footballer who plays as a left winger for Poortugaal. Born in Netherlands, he represented for the Sint Maarten national team.

== Club career ==
As a youth Hughes played for IJVV De Zwervers, along with his brothers Serfinio and Granley. Ahead of the 2016/17 season he moved to the academy of Vitesse where he stayed until 2019. During his time with the club, he scored twenty five goals in official youth league and cup competitions. The following season Hughes moved to the academy of NEC Nijmegen of the Eredivisie. As he did not make the grade in professional football, Hughes decided to join Kozakken Boys where he also started in the U23 team.

He left XerxesDZB for fellow amateur side Poortugaal in summer 2026.

== International career ==
In 2018 Hughes was named to the Netherlands' extended under-16 roster for the UEFA Development Tournament in Portugal. He went on to make his senior international debut for Sint Maarten on 3 June 2022 in a 2022–23 CONCACAF Nations League C match against the U.S. Virgin Islands. He scored his first two international goals in a 8–2 victory over the Turks and Caicos Islands. Hughes' two goals helped Sint Maarten set a new record for highest-ever margin of victory in official CONCACAF competition.

=== International goals ===
Scores and results list Sint Maarten's goal tally first.

No.	Date	Venue	Opponent	Score	Result	Competition
1.	11 June 2022	Stadion Rignaal 'Jean' Francisca, Willemstad, Curaçao	Turks and Caicos Islands	2–0	8–2	2022–23 CONCACAF Nations League C
2.	11 June 2022	Stadion Rignaal 'Jean' Francisca, Willemstad, Curaçao	Turks and Caicos Islands	5–2	8–2	2022–23 CONCACAF Nations League C
Last updated 3 July 2022

=== International career statistics ===
As of match played 14 June 2022.

Sint Maarten
Year	Apps	Goals
2022	4	2
Total	4	2
