= CONCACAF Nations League =

International football tournament in North America, Central America, and the Caribbean

- Organiser(s): CONCACAF
- Founded: 2018; 8 years ago
- Region: North America; Central America; Caribbean
- Teams: 41
- Qualifier for: Gold Cup; Copa América
- Current champions: Mexico (1st title)
- Most championships: United States (3 titles)
- Website: Nations League
- 2026–27 CONCACAF Nations League

The CONCACAF Nations League (Spanish: Liga de Naciones de la CONCACAF, French: Ligue des Nations de la CONCACAF) is an association football competition organized by CONCACAF as its secondary continental tournament for men's senior national teams from North America, Central America, and the Caribbean. The tournament takes place on dates allocated for international friendlies on the FIFA International Match Calendar. A one-time qualifying tournament took place from September 2018 to March 2019, with its inaugural edition in 2019.

== History and format competition ==
The tournament was announced in November 2017. It is divided into three tiered leagues, A, B, and C, of four groups each, with promotion and relegation between the leagues based on finishing position within groups. The group winners of League A enter a four-team knockout competition to be crowned champion, while the group winners of Leagues B and C are promoted to the next tier. In Leagues A and B, the four teams at the bottom of the groups are relegated to the next lower tier. The tournament also determines which national teams qualify for the next edition of the CONCACAF Gold Cup.

The format proposals were first formally investigated at the XXXII CONCACAF Ordinary Congress in Oranjestad, Aruba on April 8, 2017 and confirmed by CONCACAF on November 16, 2017. CONCACAF president Victor Montagliani stated that the purpose of the competition is to have a regular schedule of international fixtures for CONCACAF's national teams, noting that some teams play fewer than 10 games in a four-year period and needed more competitive games to assist the sport's development in those nations.

=== Adjustment from 2023–24 ===
On 28 February 2023, CONCACAF announced a format change for the 2023–24 season of the CONCACAF Nations League. As a result, no teams were relegated from the 2022–23 season.

The size of League A was increased from 12 to 16 teams and featured a quarter-final round. The 12 lowest-ranked teams in the CONCACAF Rankings of March 2023 entered the group stage. The teams were divided into two groups of six, with each team playing four matches against group opponents (two at home and two away). The top four teams advanced to the quarter-finals and were joined by the four top-ranked teams in the CONCACAF Rankings. The teams advancing from the group stage were drawn into ties against the top-ranked teams, which were played on a two-legged home-and-away basis.

League B remained unchanged, featuring sixteen teams divided into four groups of four. Each team played six matches in a double round-robin home-and-away format (three at home and three away). Following the format change, League C was reduced from 13 to 9 teams and from four to three groups. Teams were divided into three groups of three teams, with each team playing four matches in a double round-robin home-and-away format (two at home and two away).

Promotion and relegation resumed for the 2023–24 season, with the fifth- and sixth-placed teams in League A and the fourth-placed teams in League B being relegated for the next season. The group winners of Leagues B and C were promoted, as was the best second-placed team of League C.

In February 2026, CONCACAF announced details for the next two editions of Nations League, to be held in 2026–27 and 2028–29. The format remains similar to previous editions however a League B and League C Finals will be added.

== Trophy and seasons ==
The CONCACAF Nations League trophy was unveiled eight days before the inaugural Nations League Finals. The trophy represents all 41 CONCACAF national associations and is made of silver-plated brass and stone. The trophy weighs 8 kg (18 lb) and is 52 cm (20 in) tall.

Each season of the CONCACAF Nations League is typically played from September to November (league phase), and March or June of the following year (Nations League Finals of League A). An exception was made in the 2022–23 season when the league phase was played from June 2022 to March 2023, due to the 2022 FIFA World Cup played in Qatar at the end of the year.

== Results ==
Ed.	Season	Hosts	Final			Third place play-off		
Ed.	Season	Hosts	Champions	Score	Runners-up	Third place	Score	Fourth place
1	2019–20; Finals	United States	United States	3–2 (a.e.t.)	Mexico	Honduras	2–2 (a.e.t.) (5–4 p)	Costa Rica
2	2022–23; Finals	United States	United States	2–0	Canada	Mexico	1–0	Panama
3	2023–24; Finals	United States	United States	2–0	Mexico	Jamaica	1–0	Panama
4	2024–25; Finals	United States	Mexico	2–1	Panama	Canada	2–1	United States
5	2026–27; Finals	United States	TBD	–	TBD	TBD	–	TBD

== Performances ==
Team	Champions	Runners-up	Third place	Fourth place	Total
United States	3 (2021, 2023, 2024)	–	–	1 (2025)	4
Mexico	1 (2025)	2 (2021, 2024)	1 (2023)	–	4
Canada	–	1 (2023)	1 (2025)	–	2
Panama	–	1 (2025)	–	2 (2023, 2024)	3
Honduras	–	–	1 (2021)	–	1
Jamaica	–	–	1 (2024)	–	1
Costa Rica	–	–	–	1 (2021)	1

Notes

Italic — Hosts

== Competitive records ==
- 1 – Champions
- 2 – Runners-up
- 3 – Third place
- 4 – Fourth place
- – Quarter-finalists
- ▲ – Promoted
- – No movement
- ▼ – Relegated
- Q – Qualified for upcoming CONCACAF Nations League Finals
- – Hosts of CONCACAF Nations League Finals

National Team	Seasons in league			Season									
National Team	Seasons in league			2019–20		2022–23		2023–24		2024–25		2026–27	
National Team	A	B	C	LG	M	LG	M	LG	M	LG	M	LG	M
Anguilla	–	–	5	C	Same position	C	Same position	C	Same position	C	Same position	C	Same position
Antigua and Barbuda	–	4	1	B	Same position	B	Same position	B	Same position	B	▼	C	▲
Aruba	–	2	3	B	▼	C	Same position	C	▲	B	▼	C	▲
Bahamas	–	2	3	C	▲	B	Same position	B	▼	C	Same position	C	Same position
Barbados	–	3	2	C	▲	B	Same position	B	▼	C	▲	B	Same position
Belize	–	4	1	B	Same position	B	Same position	B	▼	C	▲	B	Same position
Bermuda	1	4	–	A	▼	B	Same position	B	Same position	B	Same position	B	▼
Bonaire	–	2	3	C	Same position	C	Same position	C	▲	B	Same position	B	▼
British Virgin Islands	–	–	5	C	Same position	C	Same position	C	Same position	C	Same position	C	Same position
Canada	5	–	–	A	Same position	A	2	A	Same position	A	3	A	
Cayman Islands	–	1	4	C	Same position	C	Same position	C	Same position	C	▲	B	▼
Costa Rica	5	–	–	A	4	A	Same position	A	Same position	A	Same position	A	Same position
Cuba	3	2	–	A	▼	B	▲	A	Same position	A	▼	B	▲
Curaçao	4	1	–	A	Same position	A	Same position	A	▼	B	▲	A	Same position
Dominica	–	3	2	B	▼	C	Same position	C	▲	B	Same position	B	Same position
Dominican Republic	1	4	–	B	Same position	B	Same position	B	Same position	B	▲	A	Same position
El Salvador	3	2	–	B	▲	A	Same position	A	▼	B	▲	A	▼
French Guiana	1	4	–	B	Same position	B	Same position	B	▲	A	▼	B	Same position
Grenada	2	3	–	B	▲	A	Same position	A	▼	B	Same position	B	Same position
Guadeloupe	1	3	1	C	▲	B	Same position	B	▲	A	▼	B	Same position
Guatemala	3	1	1	C	▲	B	▲	A	Same position	A	Same position	A	Same position
Guyana	1	4	–	B	Same position	B	Same position	B	▲	A	▼	B	▲
Haiti	3	2	–	A	▼	B	▲	A	▼	B	▲	A	Same position
Honduras	5	–	–	A	3	A	Same position	A	Same position	A	Same position	A	Same position
Jamaica	4	1	–	B	▲	A	Same position	A	3	A	Same position	A	Same position
Martinique	5	–	–	A	Same position	A	Same position	A	Same position	A	Same position	A	▼
Mexico	5	–	–	A	2	A	3	A	2	A	1	A	
Montserrat	–	4	1	B	Same position	B	Same position	B	Same position	B	▼	C	▲
Nicaragua	2	3	–	B	Same position	B	(Note: Nicaragua originally qualified for promotion to League A as winners of League B Group C, but were disqualified for fielding an ineligible player. As a result, they were replaced on 12 June 2023, by Trinidad and Tobago. Nicaragua replaced Trinidad and Tobago in League B)	B	▲	A	Same position	A	▼
Panama	5	–	–	A	Same position	A	4	A	4	A	2	A	
Puerto Rico	–	3	2	C	Same position	C	▲	B	Same position	B	Same position	B	Same position
Saint Kitts and Nevis	–	3	2	B	▼	C	▲	B	▼	C	▲	B	Same position
Saint Lucia	–	4	1	B	▼	C	▲	B	Same position	B	Same position	B	▲
Saint Martin	–	1	4	C	Same position	C	Same position	C	▲	B	▼	C	▲
Saint Vincent and the Grenadines	–	5	–	B	Same position	B	Same position	B	Same position	B	Same position	B	▲
Sint Maarten	–	3	2	C	Same position	C	▲	B	Same position	B	Same position	B	▼
Suriname	4	1	–	B	▲	A	Same position	A	Same position	A	Same position	A	Same position
Trinidad and Tobago	4	1	–	A	▼	B	▲	A	Same position	A	Same position	A	▼
Turks and Caicos Islands	–	–	5	C	Same position	C	Same position	C	Same position	C	Same position	C	Same position
United States	5	–	–	A	1	A	1	A	1	A	4	A	
U.S. Virgin Islands	–	–	5	C	Same position	C	Same position	C	Same position	C	Same position	C	Same position

== Broadcasting ==
=== CONCACAF ===
Country/region	Broadcaster		Ref.
Country/region	Free	Pay	Ref.
Aruba	Telearuba		
Belize	TNC		
Canada		OneSoccer	
Canada		TSN	
Caribbean		Flow	
Costa Rica	Repretel	Fox	
Costa Rica	Teletica	Fox	
Costa Rica	Multimedios TV	Fox	
El Salvador		Fox	
Guatemala		Fox	
Honduras	TVC	Fox	
Nicaragua	Viva Nicaragua	Fox	
Panama	RPC-TV	Fox	
Panama	TVN	Fox	
Panama	TVMax	Fox	
Curaçao	TeleCuraçao		
Dominican Republic	CDN 37		
Jamaica	TVJ		
Mexico	TV Azteca (exc. final four)		
Mexico	TelevisaUnivision (exc. final four)		
Mexico		Netflix (final four only, inc. exclusive coverage for Mexico matches)	
Puerto Rico	TeleOro		
Suriname	Telesur		
United States	Fox Sports (English)		
United States	Univision (Spanish)	VIX	

=== International ===
All matches are streamed through CONCACAF's streaming service CONCACAF GO.

Country/region	Broadcaster		Ref.
Country/region	Free	Pay	Ref.
Balkan countries: Bosnia and Herzegovina; Croatia; Montenegro; North Macedonia; Serbia; Slovenia		Sport Klub	
Brazil	Canal GOAT		
Brunei		Astro SuperSport	
Malaysia		Astro SuperSport	
Czechia		Sport1	
Slovakia		Sport1	
Denmark		Viaplay	
Finland		Viaplay	
Iceland		Viaplay	
Norway		Viaplay	
Sweden		Viaplay	
France	L'Équipe		
Israel		Sport5	
MENA	Dubai Sports		
Netherlands		ESPN	
South America		ESPN	
Portugal		Sport TV	
South Korea		ENA Sports	
Turkey		S Spor	

== Awards ==
Edition	Best Player	Top scorer	Best Goalkeeper	Best young player	Fair Play Award	Ref
2019–20	(United States) Weston McKennie	(Suriname) Gleofilo Vlijter	(Honduras) Luis López		Barbados	
2022–23	(United States) Christian Pulisic	(Sint Maarten) Gerwin Lake	(United States) Matt Turner		Panama	
2023–24	(United States) Gio Reyna	(Guyana) Omari Glasgow	(United States) Matt Turner	(Guyana) Omari Glasgow	Panama	
2024–25	(Mexico) Raúl Jiménez	(Mexico) Raúl Jiménez	(Mexico) Luis Malagón			

== See also ==
- Continental football championships
- CONCACAF Gold Cup
- CONCACAF W Gold Cup
- CONCACAF W Championship
- AFC Nations League
- African Nations League
- UEFA Nations League
