= Chovanie Amatkarijo =

Dutch-Sint Maarten footballer (born 1999)

Personal information
- Date of birth: 20 May 1999 (age 27)
- Place of birth: The Hague, Netherlands
- Height: 1.75 m (5 ft 9 in)
- Position: Winger

Team information
- Current team: Örebro SK
- Number: 25

Youth career
- HVV Laakkwartier
- 2014–2019: ADO Den Haag

Senior career*
Years	Team	Apps	(Gls)
2016–2019	ADO Den Haag	1	(0)
2016–2019	Jong ADO	23	(8)
2017–2018	→ RKC (loan)	27	(0)
2019	TOP Oss	0	(0)
2020	Scheveningen	9	(2)
2021	IF Karlstad	28	(14)
2022–2023	Östersund	40	(11)
2023	Istra 1961	2	(0)
2023–2025	GAIS	44	(3)
2025	→ Östersund (loan)	15	(3)
2026	Liepāja	21	(1)
2026–	Örebro SK	10	(1)

International career^{‡}
2023–	Sint Maarten	18	(8)
- * Club domestic league appearances and goals as of 12 November 2026 ‡ National team caps and goals as of 30 September 2026

Chovanie Amatkarijo (born 20 May 1999) is a footballer who plays for Swedish side Örebro SK. Born in the metropolitan Netherlands, he plays for the Sint Maarten national team.

== Club career ==
=== The Netherlands ===
Amatkarijo joined ADO Den Haag as a teenager and first played for the U21s as a 16 year old in a match vs SC Heerenveen U21, coming on as a substitute for Maarten Rieder on 9 May 2016, scoring his first goal in the process.

Amatkarijo made his professional debut at 18 years of age in the Eredivisie for ADO Den Haag on 29 January 2017 in a game against AFC Ajax.

He did not appear for the first team again but continued to impress for Jong ADO, scoring a hat-trick against Jong Vitesse. After starting against Willem II in Ricardo Kishna's comeback game, he scored another hat-trick against Heracles, linking up well with Johnny Reynolds and Tyrone Owusu.

He was loaned to RKC Waalwijk for the 2017–18 season in the Eerste Divisie.

On 2 September 2019, Amatkarijo joined TOP Oss on an amateur contract. However, the club announced on 17 October 2019, that Amatkarijo alongside two other players, had left the club for personal reasons.

Amatkarijo joined SVV Scheveningen in January 2020.

=== Sweden ===
In January 2021, he moved to Swedish club IF Karlstad, who compete in the third-tier Ettan.

On 9 March 2022, Amatkarijo signed a two-year contract with Östersunds FK in the Swedish second-tier Superettan.

After spending only two months in Croatia for Istra 1961, Amatkarijo signed for Superettan side GAIS, on 30 August 2023, on a contract until the end of 2026.

== International career ==
=== International goals ===
Scores and results list Sint Maarten's goal tally first.

No.	Date	Venue	Opponent	Score	Result	Competition
1.	25 March 2023	Bethlehem Soccer Stadium, Saint Croix, US Virgin Islands	Bonaire	3–0	6–1	2022–23 CONCACAF Nations League C
2.	7 August 2023	Stadion Rignaal 'Jean' Francisca, Willemstad, Curaçao	Saint Lucia	1–2	1–5	2023–24 CONCACAF Nations League B
Last updated 25 March 2023
