= Kurt Frederick (footballer) =

Saint Lucian footballer (born 1991)

Personal information
- Date of birth: 27 April 1991 (age 35)
- Place of birth: Dennery, Saint Lucia
- Height: 1.87 m (6 ft 2 in)
- Position: Left-back

Team information
- Current team: Morvant Caledonia United

Senior career*
| Years | Team | Apps | (Gls) |
| 2010–2017 | W Connection | 86 | (9) |
| 2017–2018 | Alajuelense | 18 | (0) |
| 2018–2021 | W Connection | 11 | (0) |
| 2021–2022 | Platinum FC | | |
| 2022–2023 | Grenades F.C. | | |
| 2023–2024 | El Niños | | |
| 2024–2025 | Grenades F.C. | | |
| 2025– | Morvant Caledonia United | | |

International career^{‡}
- Saint Lucia U17
| 2010– | Saint Lucia | 69 | (12) |
- * Club domestic league appearances and goals as of 8 October 2018 ‡ National team caps and goals as of 24 March 2026

Kurt Frederick (born 27 April 1991) is a Saint Lucian professional footballer who plays as a left-back for TT Premier Football League club Morvant Caledonia United and captains the Saint Lucia national team.

== Career statistics ==
Appearances and goals by national team and year
| National team | Year | Apps | Goals |
|---|---|---|---|
| Saint Lucia | 2010 | 4 | 0 |
| Saint Lucia | 2011 | 9 | 1 |
| Saint Lucia | 2012 | 3 | 1 |
| Saint Lucia | 2015 | 5 | 1 |
| Saint Lucia | 2017 | 4 | 2 |
| Saint Lucia | 2018 | 3 | 0 |
| Saint Lucia | 2019 | 11 | 1 |
| Saint Lucia | 2022 | 4 | 2 |
| Saint Lucia | 2023 | 8 | 2 |
| Saint Lucia | 2024 | 8 | 0 |
| Saint Lucia | 2025 | 4 | 0 |
| Total | | 69 | 11 |

Score and results lists Saint Lucia's goals first.

| No. | Date | Venue | Opponent | Score | Result | Competition |
|---|---|---|---|---|---|---|
| 1. | 12 July 2011 | Mindoo Phillip Park, Castries, Saint Lucia | Aruba | 4–1 | 4–2 | 2014 FIFA World Cup qualification |
| 2. | 21 October 2012 | Beausejour Stadium, Gros Islet, Saint Lucia | Curaçao | 5–1 | 5–1 | 2012 Caribbean Cup qualification |
| 3. | 14 June 2015 | Ato Boldon Stadium, Couva, Trinidad and Tobago | Antigua and Barbuda | 1–0 | 1–2 | 2014 Caribbean Cup qualification |
| 4. | 14 June 2015 | Sir Vivian Richards Stadium, North Sound, Antigua and Barbuda | Antigua and Barbuda | 1–4 | 1–4 | 2018 FIFA World Cup qualification |
| 5. | 28 June 2017 | Kirani James Athletic Stadium, St. George's, Grenada | Saint Vincent and the Grenadines | 2–0 | 2–1 | 2017 Windward Islands Tournament |
| 6. | 3 July 2017 | Kirani James Athletic Stadium, St. George's, Grenada | Barbados | 1–0 | 1–1 | 2017 Windward Islands Tournament |
| 7. | 10 September 2019 | Blakes Estate Stadium, Lookout, Montserrat | Montserrat | 1–1 | 1–1 | 2019–20 CONCACAF Nations League B |
| 8. | 12 June 2022 | Daren Sammy Cricket Ground, Gros Islet, Saint Lucia | Anguilla | 2–0 | 2–0 | 2022–23 CONCACAF Nations League C |
| 9. | 20 November 2022 | Daren Sammy Cricket Ground, Gros Islet, Saint Lucia | San Marino | 1–0 | 1–0 | Friendly |
| 10. | 27 March 2023 | Daren Sammy Cricket Ground, Gros Islet, Saint Lucia | Dominica | 2–0 | 3–1 | 2022–23 CONCACAF Nations League C |
| 11. | 27 March 2023 | Daren Sammy Cricket Ground, Gros Islet, Saint Lucia | Dominica | 3–0 | 3–1 | 2022–23 CONCACAF Nations League C |
