= Leeward Islands Football Association =

- Formation: 1949
- Type: Sports organization
- Members: 11 member associations

Leeward Islands Football Association (LIFA) is an association of the football playing nations in Leeward archipelago and was founded in 1949. It is affiliated to CFU.

== Members ==
It has 11 members, some of them are not CONCACAF members:

- Antigua and Barbuda
- Saint Kitts^
- Sint Maarten
- Anguilla
- Saint Croix^
- Montserrat
- Tortola^
- Nevis^
- (Collectivity of Saint Martin) Saint Martin
- Saint Thomas^
- Virgin Gorda^

^ Not affiliated to CONCACAF

== Leeward Islands Tournament ==
Of the early tournaments only the winners are known; for the recent ones, the structure is largely unknown. It is also not known whether tournaments were staged in the missing years, though this is likely.

It is not always clear whether teams represent single islands or states (e.g. Saint Kitts/Nevis or Saint Christopher, Antigua/Barbuda or Antigua, etc.).

A new edition was to be played in August 2014 with 8 teams; originally slated for August 9–17, it was postponed to a tentative date later in the year.

=== Medalists ===
==== Men ====
Year	Host	Final
Year	Host	Gold Medal	Score	Silver Medal
1949		Antigua
1950		Saint Kitts and Nevis
1951		Saint Kitts and Nevis
1952		Saint Kitts and Nevis
1953		Saint Kitts and Nevis
1954		Saint Kitts and Nevis
1955		Saint Kitts and Nevis
1956		Saint Kitts and Nevis
1957		Saint Kitts and Nevis
1958		Saint Kitts and Nevis
1959		Saint Kitts and Nevis
1985	Antigua	Saint Kitts	1 - 0	Antigua
1986		British Virgin Islands		Antigua
1994		Antigua	1 - 0	Saint Martin
1995		Saint Kitts		Antigua
1996	Antigua	Saint Kitts		Antigua
1997	Saint Kitts	Saint Kitts	2 - 0	Antigua and Barbuda
1998	Sint Maarten	Saint Kitts	3 - 1	Antigua
1999	Antigua	Saint Kitts	3 - 2	Antigua
2000		not held
2001	Saint Thomas	Saint Kitts	2 - 0	Antigua
2002	Antigua	Saint Kitts	2 - 0	Antigua and Barbuda
