= Sint Maarten Football Federation =

Governing body of football in Sint Maarten

CONCACAF
- Founded: 1986
- FIFA affiliation: N/A
- CONCACAF affiliation: 2002 (Associate member), 2013
- President: Johnny Singh
- Website: https://www.sxmfootball.com/

The Sint Maarten Football Federation is the governing body of association football in Sint Maarten. It was founded in 1986 and its president is Johnny Singh. The federation administers the men's national football team, the women's national football team, and various national leagues, predominantly the Sint Maarten Senior League.

The FF mostly fell inactive around 2010, with football being described as a "mess" and returned in 2015, with national and international football coming back. Hurricane Irma devastated the island in 2017 and football was limited for a time, but managed to unsuccessfully apply to FIFA in 2022. An appeal was made to the Court of Arbitration for Sport and the result is undecided by August 2022.

== Football stadiums in Sint Maarten ==
| Stadium | Capacity | City |
|---|---|---|
| Raoul Illidge Sports Complex | 3,000 | Philipsburg |
