= FC Brandenburg 03 Berlin =

Association football club in Bermuda

- Full name: Fußball Club Brandenburg 03 Berlin eV
- Founded: 25 March 1903; 121 years ago
- Stadium: Sportplatz Sömmeringstraße
- Capacity: 3000
- League: Landesliga Berlin
- Website: http://brandenburg03.de/

Fußball Club Brandenburg 03 Berlin eV is a German football team based in Berlin. The club presently competes in the Landesliga Berlin.

== History ==
On 25 March 1903, the club was founded by a group of 17 men under the name BSC Deutschland.

After World War One, very little of the club remained and the remaining players joined VfK Charlottenburg. In 1918, VfK merged with Charlottenburger Turngemeinschaft 1858 and Allgemeinen Turnerschaft Charlottenburg. In 1923, the football department became independent again under the name SuS Brandenburg.

In 1933, due to pressure from the Nazi regime, the club was forced to merge with CFC Hertha 06 and played under the name FC Brandenburg-Hertha 06, however, the merger was cancelled after one season. After World War Two, all German football clubs were dissolved and the major club SG Charlottenburg came to Charlottenburg. In 1949, the club became independent again as FC Brandenburg 03.
