= Raoul Illidge Sports Complex =

Multi-use stadium in Sint Maarten

Coordinates: 18°01′43.4″N 63°04′0.1″W

- Interactive map of Raoul Illidge Sports Complex
- Location: Welgelegen Road; Philipsburg, Sint Maarten
- Capacity: 3,000
- Surface: artificial turf

Construction
- Opened: 1987
- Renovated: 2013
- Cost: ƒ3,000,000
- Architect: MNO Vervat St. Maarten (renovation)

Tenants
- Sint Maarten national teams SMSA clubs

Raoul Illidge Sports Complex is a multi-use stadium in Philipsburg, Sint Maarten. It is currently used mostly for football matches. The stadium holds 3,000 people. The stadium is located on the Dutch side of the island.

== History ==
The complex was built in the 1980s. It was renovated in 1999 to host that year's Kingdom Games. The Sint Maarten national football team plays its home matches at the stadium, which has a capacity of 3,000 spectators. It is named after Raoul Illidge, a local philanthropist who laid the groundwork and covered many expenses in the planning of the stadium as part of his support for sport and culture on the island. Unsolicited, he contributed nearly ƒ800,000 for the project. After falling into disrepair, the complex was temporarily closed for renovation in July 2013. The two-part renovation included installation of a new running track, drainage system, and artificial turf, repainting of lighting poles and installation of new, brighter lights, in addition to a renovation of the complex's buildings. The renovation costs were financed by the Dutch funding agency Usona and the Sint Maarten government. The international sports park was officially reopened with a ribbon cutting ceremony by Prime Minister Sarah Wescot-Williams and Minister of Education, Culture, Youth and Sports Affairs Patricia Lourens-Phillip on 7 March 2014. On September 5, 2017, Hurricane Irma, hit the complex and greatly damaged it, it was closed for two months for repairs. Within the complex there is a sports field, an athletics track, long jump pits, a 30 meter swimming pool, two tennis courts, a basketball/volleyball court, a playground, and a high jump area.
