= Sint Maarten national football team =

Men's association football team

Sint Maarten
- Association: Sint Maarten Football Federation (SXMFF)
- Confederation: CONCACAF (North America)
- Sub-confederation: CFU (Caribbean)
- Head coach: Piet de Jong
- Captain: Kay Gerritsen
- Most caps: Kay Gerritsen (30)
- Top scorer: Gerwin Lake (21)
- Home stadium: Raoul Illidge Sports Complex
- FIFA code: SXM; SMA (CONCACAF Code)
First colours	Second colours

FIFA ranking
- Current: NR (18 November 2026)
- Highest: –

First international
- Sint Maarten 1–3 Saint Martin (Philipsburg, Sint Maarten; 14 June 1988)

Biggest win
- Sint Maarten 8–2 Turks and Caicos Islands (Willemstad, Curaçao; 11 June 2022)

Biggest defeat
- Haiti 13–0 Sint Maarten (Port-au-Prince, Haiti; 10 September 2018)

Caribbean Cup
- Appearances: 1 (first in 1993)
- Best result: Group stage (1993)

The Sint Maarten national football team (Dutch: Sint Maartens voetbalelftal) is the football team of Sint Maarten, the Dutch half of the Caribbean island of Saint Martin, and is controlled by the Sint Maarten Football Federation. Sint Maarten is not a member of FIFA, and therefore not eligible to enter the World Cup. However, the association applied for FIFA membership in 2016 but was rejected. In April 2022, the Sint Maarten Football Federation appealed to the CAS against FIFA's ruling.

In 2002, the Sint Maarten Soccer Association was given associate membership in CONCACAF and became full members at the XXVIII Ordinary Congress in April 2013 after becoming a distinct country within the Kingdom of the Netherlands after the Netherlands Antilles was dissolved in 2010. They are also members of the Caribbean Football Union and first took part in the Caribbean Cup in its inaugural edition in 1989.

== History ==
From 1992 to 2016, the team had played approximately only 25 official matches. Between 2000 and 2016, only one match had been played, an unofficial 2–2 draw at home to Sint Eustatius on 20 August 2004. In 2012, SMSA President Owen Nickie stated that the national team's inactivity was due to a lack of needed improvements on their home stadium. He indicated that not having enough players to choose from had also prevented the team from competing in the past but that they had more than enough players at that time. At that time, the association discussed hosting the Leeward Islands Tournament and participating in 2012 Caribbean Cup qualification as two of its objectives for the year. Nickie described not entering a team in the Caribbean Cup in the past as "unfortunate". In August 2014, Sint Maarten was set to co-host the Leeward Islands Tournament which had been dormant at that time for over ten years. However, the tournament was postponed after Sint Maarten withdrew as host because of difficulties with the newly installed lights at the Raoul Illidge Sports Complex and Anguilla, the other host, withdrew for unspecified reasons. One report also indicated that the hosts withdrew because of an "inability to facilitate teams." In May 2015, a match was organized by the SMSA as a showcase for selecting a national team player pool. It was open to all players with a Dutch passport. Although Sint Maarten's senior team was dormant, a youth selection participated in the inaugural CONCACAF Under-15 Championship in August 2013 and Sint Maarten co-hosted the 2015 CFU Boy's Under-15 Championship after the 2015 CONCACAF Under-15 Championship was canceled by CONCACAF for unspecified reasons.

=== 2017 Caribbean Cup ===
Sint Maarten returned to international football in 2016, entering 2017 Caribbean Cup qualification and being drawn into Group 2 along with Grenada and the US Virgin Islands with the first round matches taking place on 22 and 26 March 2016. Sint Maarten had been absent from senior CFU competition for nineteen years as they entered the tournament. In January 2016 it was announced that Sint Maarten's squad for 2017 Caribbean Cup qualification would be composed solely of players from Flames United SC, reigning champions from the 2014/2015 Senior league competitions and the champions of the 2012/2013 Excellence Division between the islands of Sint Maarten, Saint Martin and St. Barths. However, shortly thereafter it was reported that the previous report was inaccurate and that Flames United would actually be competing in the CFU Club Championship. Sint Maarten played its first senior men's international in 12 years on 13 March 2016 as it hosted a 2–0 home victory against Anguilla as part of each side's preparation for 2017 Caribbean Cup qualification. Both of Sint Maarten's goals were scored by Joost Röben. In the first match of the tournament, Sint Maarten held Grenada to a scoreless draw in the first half which saw two of Sint Maarten's starters sustain injuries. It was later revealed that Raymond Wolff had sustained a broken rib before coming off in the first half while fellow-Dutchman Rick De Punder was credited with an own goal. Grenada scored five goals in the second half to secure the 5–0 victory. Sint Maarten arrived on Grenada for the 8pm match at 4pm after the funds for the team airfare, paid for by the CFU, did not reach the airline in time and no seats were available. SMSA President Johnny Singh thought that the team would not be able to compete but another flight was arranged in time. The same scenario occurred for the return flight but the team was expected to be home on the Thursday prior to the team's match against USVI on Saturday. Sint Maarten went on to lose the match to USVI 1–2, ending the team's qualifying campaign. Sint Maarten's only goal was scored by Ramsleii Boelijn.

== Stadium ==
Sint Maarten plays its home matches at the Raoul Illidge Sports Complex in Philipsburg. The stadium has a capacity of 3,000 spectators. It is named after Raoul Illidge, a local philanthropist who laid the groundwork and covered many expenses in the planning of the stadium as part of his support for sport and culture on the island. Unsolicited, he contributed nearly ƒ800,000 for the project. After falling into disrepair, the complex was temporarily closed for renovation in July 2013. The two-part renovation included installation of a new running track, drainage system, and artificial turf, repainting of lighting poles and installation of new, brighter lights, in addition to a renovation of the complex's buildings. The renovation costs were financed by the Dutch funding agency Usona and the Sint Maarten government. The international sports park was official reopened with a ribbon cutting ceremony by Prime Minister Sarah Wescot-Williams and Minister of Education, Culture, Youth and Sports Affairs Patricia Lourens-Phillip on 7 March 2014.

== Results and fixtures ==
The following is a list of match results in the last 12 months, as well as any future matches that have been scheduled.

Win Draw Loss Fixture

=== 2025 ===
12 November 2025–26 CONCACAF Series	Saint Kitts and Nevis	0–0	Sint Maarten	Basseterre, Saint Kitts and Nevis
				Stadium: SKNFA Technical Center

15 November 2025–26 CONCACAF Series	Dominica	2–3	Sint Maarten	Basseterre, Saint Kitts and Nevis
				Stadium: SKNFA Technical Center

=== 2026 ===
27 March 2025-26 CONCACAF Series	Belize	2–3	Sint Maarten	Santiago de los Caballeros (Dominican Republic)
19:30 UTC−4	Reneau 37' (pen.); Polanco 55'	Report	Illidge 34'; Amatkarijo 77', 90+1'	Stadium: Estadio Cibao FC; Referee: Wikelson Bonnet (Haiti)

30 March 2025–26 CONCACAF Series	Dominica	0–0	Sint Maarten	Santiago de los Caballeros, Dominican Republic
19:30 UTC−4		Report		Stadium: Estadio Cibao FC; Referee: Adrian Lage (Cuba)

26 September 2026–27 CONCACAF Nations League	Sint Maarten	0–1	Belize	Belmopan, Belize
22:00 UTC−4	R. Olivacce (red card) 35'	Report	N. Guerra 52'	Stadium: FFB Stadium

29 September 2026–27 CONCACAF Nations League	French Guiana	1–0	Sint Maarten	Belmopan, Belize
17:00 UTC−4	Haabo 90+5'	Report		Stadium: FFB Stadium; Referee: Raúl Castro (Honduras)

3 October 2026–27 CONCACAF Nations League	Sint Maarten	2–4	Saint Vincent and the Grenadines	Belmopan, Belize
17:00 UTC−4	De Nooijer 74'; Christina 82'	Report	Anderson 11', 24', 57'; Hughes 34' (o.g.)	Stadium: FFB Stadium; Referee: Jorge Ojeda (Nicaragua)

6 October 2026–27 CONCACAF Nations League	Saint Vincent and the Grenadines	4–0	Sint Maarten	Belmopan, Belize
17:00 UTC−4	Anderson 21'; Spring 40'; Solomon 44'; Stewart 73'	Report		Stadium: FFB Stadium; Referee: Filiberto Martinez (El Salvador)

10 November Friendly	Sint Maarten	5–1	Anguilla	Philipsburg, Sint Maarten
20:00 UTC−4	Tavernier 23'; Martina 34'; Amatkarijo 68'; Bleeker 88'; Lake 93'	Report	Tesselaar 97' (pen.)	Stadium: Raoul Illidge Sports Complex

14 November 2026–27 CONCACAF Nations League	Sint Maarten	v	French Guiana	Kingstown, Saint Vincent and the Grenadines
				Stadium: Arnos Vale Stadium

17 November 2026–27 CONCACAF Nations League	Belize	v	Sint Maarten	Kingstown, Saint Vincent and the Grenadines
				Stadium: Arnos Vale Stadium

== Coaching history ==
- (Sint Maarten) Ronny Wadilie (2016–2018)
- (Aruba) Elvis Albertus (2018–2019)
- ??? (2019–2022)
- (Netherlands) Piet de Jong (2022–)

== Players ==
=== Current squad ===
The following players were called up for 2025–26 CONCACAF Series matches against Belize and Dominica on 27 and 30 March 2026.

Caps and goals as of 15 November 2025 after the game against Dominica.

No.	Pos.	Player	Date of birth (age)	Caps	Goals	Club
	GK	Tyrell Richardson	8 July 2003 (age 23)	15	0	(Royal Dutch Football Association) Alphense Boys
	GK	Cartalino Joseph	22 April 2002 (age 24)	1	0	(Royal Dutch Football Association) TAC '90
18	GK	Chandro Wilkin	14 November 2006 (age 20)	0	0	(Sint Maarten Football Federation) SCSA Eagles
	DF	Sergio Hughes	24 February 2002 (age 24)	20	2	(Royal Dutch Football Association) XerxesDZB
	DF	Ilounga Pata	12 November 2000 (age 26)	17	1	(Portuguese Football Federation) Mafra
	DF	Duane Tjen-A-Kwoei	11 August 1998 (age 28)	17	0	(Royal Dutch Football Association) VV Nieuwenhoorn
3	DF	Mitchell de Nooijer	29 February 2000 (age 26)	16	1	(Royal Dutch Football Association) Goes
12	DF	Ronan Olivacce	27 March 2004 (age 22)	12	1	(Royal Dutch Football Association) Excelsior
	DF	Mike Richardson	5 September 2008 (age 18)	2	0	(Royal Dutch Football Association) USV Hercules
20	DF	Tyrel Gumbs		1	0	(Royal Dutch Football Association) SV DIOS
4	DF	Nathaniël Krabbendam		0	0	(Royal Dutch Football Association) BVV Barendrecht
10	MF	Kay Gerritsen	25 April 1997 (age 29)	26	2	(Royal Dutch Football Association) DSOV
8	MF	Ties Kerssies	26 December 2003 (age 22)	19	1	(Royal Dutch Football Association) Roda '46
6	MF	Oliver Hobgood	1 July 2004 (age 22)	18	0	(Danish Football Association) BK Herning Fremad
19	MF	Quintón Christina	3 May 1995 (age 31)	15	1	(Curaçao Football Federation) CVV Inter Willemstad
	MF	T-Shawn Illidge	22 August 2003 (age 23)	15	2	(Royal Dutch Football Association) FC Den Bosch
	MF	Neil Henderson	28 October 2008 (age 18)	0	0	(Sint Maarten Football Federation) SCSA Eagles
	FW	Gerwin Lake	9 April 1996 (age 30)	26	18	(Royal Dutch Football Association) Rijnmond Hoogvliet
21	FW	Elmer de Vries	19 November 2000 (age 26)	20	2	(Royal Dutch Football Association) TOGB
7	FW	Chovanie Amatkarijo	20 May 1999 (age 27)	19	8	(Swedish Football Association) Östersunds FK
9	FW	Imar Kort	13 June 1998 (age 28)	14	2	(Royal Dutch Football Association) HSV De Zuidvogels
22	FW	Len Bleeker	28 August 2005 (age 21)	8	1	(Royal Dutch Football Association) CION Vlaardingen
	FW	Jhayden York		1	0	(Royal Dutch Football Association) ASWH

=== Recent call-ups ===
The following players have also been called up to the Sint Maarten squad within the last twelve months.

Pos.	Player	Date of birth (age)	Caps	Goals	Club	Latest call-up
DF	Diaro Forsythe	11 January 2001 (age 25)	23	0	(Netherlands) 't Zand	v. Dominica; 15 November 2025
MF	Kael Richards	13 February 2000 (age 26)	19	0	(United States) City Soccer FC	v. Dominica; 15 November 2025
MF	Roy Gerritsen	20 January 1999 (age 27)	4	0	(Netherlands) FC VVC	v. Dominica; 15 November 2025
Notes: ^{INJ} = Withdrew due to injury; ^{PRE} = Preliminary squad / standby; ^{RET} = Retired from the national team; ^{WD} = Player withdrew from the squad due to non-injury issue.

== Player records ==
As of 15 November 2025
Players in bold are still active with Sint Maarten.

=== Most appearances ===
Rank	Player	Caps	Goals	Career
1	Kay Gerritsen	26	2	2019–present
1	Gerwin Lake	26	18	2019–present
3	Diaro Forsythe	23	0	2018–present
4	Sergio Hughes	20	2	2022–present
4	Elmer de Vries	20	2	2022–present
6	Chovanie Amatkarijo	19	8	2023–present
6	Ties Kerssies	19	1	2022–present
6	Kael Richards	19	0	2019–present
9	Oliver Hobgood	18	0	2023–present
10	Ilounga Pata	17	1	2022–present
10	Duane Tjen-A-Kwoei	17	0	2022–present

=== Top goalscorers ===
Rank	Player	Goals	Caps	Ratio	Career
1	**Gerwin Lake**	18	26	0.69	2019–present
2	**Chovanie Amatkarijo**	8	19	0.42	2023–present
3	Remsley Boelijn	3	10	0.3	2016–2019
4	Joost Röben	2	3	0.67	2016
4	Jaeremi Drijvers	2	4	0.5	2018–2019
4	**T-Shawn Illidge**	2	15	0.13	2023–present
4	**Sergio Hughes**	2	20	0.1	2022–present
4	**Elmer de Vries**	2	20	0.1	2022–present
4	**Kay Gerritsen**	2	26	0.08	2019–present

== Competitive record ==
=== CONCACAF Gold Cup ===
CONCACAF Gold Cup record
Year	Round	Pld	W	D*	L	GF	GA
(United States) 1991	Did not enter						
(Mexico) (United States) 1993	Did not qualify						
(United States) 1996	Did not qualify						
(United States) 1998	Did not qualify						
(United States) 2000	Withdrew						
(United States) 2002	Did not enter						
(Mexico) (United States) 2003	Did not enter						
(United States) 2005	Withdrew						
(United States) 2007	Did not enter						
(United States) 2009	Did not enter						
(United States) 2011	Did not enter						
(United States) 2013	Did not enter						
(Canada) (United States) 2015	Did not enter						
(United States) 2017	Did not qualify						
(Costa Rica) (Jamaica) (United States) 2019	Did not qualify						
(United States) 2021	Did not qualify						
(Canada) (United States) 2023	Did not qualify						
(Canada) (United States) 2025	Did not qualify						
Total	0/18						

=== CONCACAF Nations League ===
CONCACAF Nations League record
League										Finals								
Season	Division	Group	Pld	W	D	L	GF	GA	P/R	Finals	Result	Pld	W	D	L	GF	GA	Squad
2019–20	C	D	4	0	0	4	6	15	Same position	(United States) 2021	Ineligible							
2022–23	C	A	6	3	2	1	19	9	▲	(United States) 2023	Ineligible							
2023–24	B	A	6	2	0	4	6	15	Same position	(United States) 2024	Ineligible							
2024–25	B	C	6	3	0	3	7	18	Same position	(United States) 2025	Ineligible							
Total	—	—	22	8	2	12	38	57	—	Total	0 Titles	—	—	—	—	—	—	—

=== Caribbean Cup ===
Caribbean Cup record								Qualification record					
Year	Round	Pld	W	D*	L	GF	GA	Pld	W	D*	L	GF	GA
(Barbados) 1989	Did not qualify							4	0	0	4	1	33
(Trinidad and Tobago) 1990	Did not qualify							2	0	2	0	3	3
(Jamaica) 1991	Did not enter							Did not enter					
(Trinidad and Tobago) 1992	Did not qualify							2	1	1	0	5	3
(Jamaica) 1993	Group stage	3	0	1	2	6	13	2	2	0	0	2	0
(Trinidad and Tobago) 1994	Did not qualify							3	1	0	2	5	9
(Cayman Islands) (Jamaica) 1995	Did not qualify							2	0	0	2	0	7
(Trinidad and Tobago) 1996	Did not qualify							2	1	0	1	4	3
(Antigua and Barbuda) (Saint Kitts and Nevis) 1997	Did not qualify							3	2	0	1	6	3
(Trinidad and Tobago) (Jamaica) 1998	Did not enter							Did not enter					
(Trinidad and Tobago) 1999	Did not enter							Did not enter					
(Trinidad and Tobago) 2001	Did not enter							Did not enter					
(Barbados) 2005	Did not enter							Did not enter					
(Trinidad and Tobago) 2007	Did not enter							Did not enter					
(Jamaica) 2008	Did not enter							Did not enter					
(Martinique) 2010	Did not enter							Did not enter					
(Antigua and Barbuda) 2012	Did not enter							Did not enter					
(Jamaica) 2014	Did not enter							Did not enter					
(Martinique) 2017	Did not qualify							2	0	0	2	1	7
Total	Group stage	3	0	1	2	6	13	22	5	3	14	25	68

*Draws include knockout matches decided via penalty shoot-out.

== Head-to-head record ==
As of 3 October 2026

Opponent	Pld	W	D	L	GF	GA	GD
Anguilla	7	4	3	0	13	3	+10
Antigua and Barbuda	3	1	0	2	2	7	−5
Aruba	1	1	0	0	2	0	+2
Belize	2	1	0	1	3	3	0
Bermuda	1	0	0	1	0	12	−12
Bonaire	3	2	1	0	11	4	+7
British Virgin Islands	6	2	1	3	10	9	+1
Cayman Islands	3	1	1	1	5	8	−3
Dominica	5	1	1	3	4	8	−4
French Guiana	2	0	0	2	1	5	−4
Grenada	1	0	0	1	0	5	−5
Guadeloupe	6	0	0	6	4	20	−16
Haiti	3	0	0	3	0	27	−27
Jamaica	2	0	0	2	2	5	−3
Martinique	2	0	1	1	1	11	−10
Netherlands Antilles	1	0	0	1	1	2	−1
Puerto Rico	3	1	0	2	4	7	−3
Saint Barthélemy	2	0	1	1	4	6	−2
Saint Kitts and Nevis	7	2	2	3	6	10	−4
Saint Lucia	2	1	0	1	3	6	−3
Saint Martin	2	1	0	1	5	6	−1
Turks and Caicos Islands	6	1	0	5	16	20	−4
Saint Vincent and the Grenadines	2	0	0	2	3	10	−7
U.S. Virgin Islands	3	1	1	1	4	4	0
Total	74	20	12	42	103	195	−92
