= Stadion Rignaal 'Jean' Francisca =

Curaçaoan association football stadium

- Interactive map of Stadion Rignaal 'Jean' Francisca
- Location: Brievengat, Willemstad, Curaçao
- Coordinates: 12.1224°N 68.8824°W
- Owner: FFK
- Capacity: 3,000
- Surface: Artificial turf

The Stadion Rignaal 'Jean' Francisca is an association football stadium in Willemstad, Curaçao.

== History ==
In December 2021, the FFK Stadium was given its current name in honor of Rignaal 'Jean' Francisca who served as president of the Curaçao Football Federation for nineteen years.

In May 2022 an incident unrelated to football resulted in a shooting death at the stadium.

== Events ==
The stadium hosts select matches of the Curaçao national football team as well as the matches of other football national teams from around the region.
