= 2026–27 CONCACAF Nations League B =

Tournament details
- Dates: Group phase: 24 September – 17 November 2026; League Championship: 26–29 March 2027
- Teams: 16
- Promoted: Cuba; Guyana; Saint Lucia; Saint Vincent and the Grenadines
- Relegated: Bermuda; Bonaire; Cayman Islands; Sint Maarten

Tournament statistics
- Matches played: 48
- Goals scored: 176 (3.67 per match)
- Top scorer: (Saint Kitts and Nevis) Tiquanny Williams (12 goals)
- All statistics correct as of 17 November 2026.

The 2026–27 CONCACAF Nations League B is the second division of the 2026–27 edition of the CONCACAF Nations League, the fifth season of the international football competition involving the men's national teams of the 41 member associations of CONCACAF. The initial group stage will be held from 24 September to 17 November 2026.

League B will culminate with the League Championship in March 2027 to crown the champions of League B.

This edition of the CONCACAF Nations League B will determine four teams that qualify directly for the 2027 CONCACAF Gold Cup in the United States. The top four teams will qualify for the final tournament while the two best group runners-up can still qualify via the 2027 CONCACAF Gold Cup qualification tournament.

== Format ==
Starting this season, CONCACAF introduced a final round following the group stage for Leagues B and C in order to determine a winner for each league, similar to the format used in League A. The group stage maintains the same format, with the 16 teams divided into four groups of four, and each group playing on a double round-robin basis. Group stage matches will continue to be played at centralized venues, as decided in the previous season, in the official FIFA match windows of September–October and November 2026. The first-placed team of each group will be promoted to the 2028–29 CONCACAF Nations League A and will advance to the Nations League B Finals. The fourth-placed team of each group will be relegated to the 2028–29 CONCACAF Nations League C.

The Nations League B Finals will consists of a semi-final round, third place play-off and the final match, and will be played in March 2027 at a centralized venue to be determined by CONCACAF.

=== 2027 CONCACAF Gold Cup qualification ===
As announced by CONCACAF in February 2026, the 2026–27 CONCACAF Nations League will serve as a qualifier for the 2027 CONCACAF Gold Cup. League B teams can qualify for the 2027 CONCACAF Gold Cup final tournament or the Gold Cup qualification tournament (also called CONCACAF Gold Cup prelims), as follows:

- The four group winners (i.e., the four teams that are promoted to League A and compete in the League B Finals) will qualify directly for the 2027 CONCACAF Gold Cup.
- The best two second-placed teams will qualify for the 2027 CONCACAF Gold Cup qualification tournament.

== Teams ==
A total of sixteen national teams contest League B, including eight sides from the 2024–25 season, four relegated teams from the 2024–25 League A, and four promoted teams from the 2024–25 League C.

=== Team changes ===
The following are the team changes in League B regarding the 2024–25 season:

Incoming
Relegated from Nations League A	Promoted from Nations League C
Guadeloupe; Guyana; Cuba; French Guiana	Barbados; Belize; Cayman Islands; Saint Kitts and Nevis

Outgoing
Promoted to Nations League A	Relegated to Nations League C
Curaçao; Dominican Republic; El Salvador; Haiti	Aruba; Antigua and Barbuda; Montserrat; Saint Martin

=== Seeding ===
The pots were confirmed on 21 July 2026, with the sixteen League B teams being split into four pots of four teams, based on the CONCACAF Rankings as of 21 July 2026.

Pot 1
Team	Rank	Pts
Guadeloupe	14	1,152
Guyana	17	1,064
Cuba	19	1,014
French Guiana	20	950

Pot 2
Team	Rank	Pts
Saint Vincent and the Grenadines	21	873
Puerto Rico	22	865
Bermuda	23	835
Grenada	24	809

Pot 3
Team	Rank	Pts
Saint Lucia	25	772
Saint Kitts and Nevis	26	770
Belize	27	735
Dominica	29	618

Pot 4
Team	Rank	Pts
Sint Maarten	30	603
Bonaire	32	554
Barbados	34	547
Cayman Islands	36	433

=== Draw ===
External videos
- Official Draw | 2026/27 Concacaf Nations League

The draw for the group stage was held on 23 July 2026, 19:00 EDT (UTC−4), in Miami, Florida, United States, where the sixteen involved teams were drawn into four groups of four. The draw began by randomly selecting a team from Pot 1 and placing them in Group A and then selecting the remaining teams from Pot 1 and placing them into groups B, C and D in sequential order. The draw continued with the same procedure done for the remaining pots.

The draw resulted in the following groups:

Group A
Pos	Team
A1	Guyana
A2	Puerto Rico
A3	Dominica
A4	Cayman Islands

Group B
Pos	Team
B1	Guadeloupe
B2	Bermuda
B3	Saint Lucia
B4	Barbados

Group C
Pos	Team
C1	Cuba
C2	Grenada
C3	Saint Kitts and Nevis
C4	Bonaire

Group D
Pos	Team
D1	French Guiana
D2	Saint Vincent and the Grenadines
D3	Belize
D4	Sint Maarten

== Group stage ==
The hosts for group stage matches were chosen based on the CONCACAF Rankings (as of 20 July 2026) used to seed the teams prior to the draw.

The third-highest ranked national association hosted the first two matchdays in its respective group, while the second-highest ranked national association hosted the next two matchdays, with all four matchdays held in the September–October FIFA match window. Likewise, the top-ranked national association will be responsible for hosting all matches in its group scheduled in the November FIFA match window. In all cases, an alternative neutral venue could be selected, subject to CONCACAF approval.

The fixture list was confirmed by CONCACAF on 24 July 2026. All match times are in EDT (UTC−4) for September and October fixtures and EST (UTC−5) for November fixtures, as listed by CONCACAF (local times, if different, are in parentheses).

=== Group A ===
Pos	Team	Pld	W	D	L	GF	GA	GD	Pts	Qualification or relegation	(Guyana)	(Puerto Rico)	(Dominica)	(Cayman Islands)
1	Guyana (H, P)	6	6	0	0	26	4	+22	18	Promotion to League A, qualification for Gold Cup, and advance to semi-finals	—	4–2	8–1	2–0
2	Puerto Rico (H)	6	4	0	2	12	7	+5	12	Qualification for Gold Cup prelims	0–1	—	4–2	1–0
3	Dominica (H)	6	1	1	4	9	19	−10	4		1–5	0–2	—	5–0
4	Cayman Islands (R)	6	0	1	5	0	17	−17	1	Relegation to League C	0–6	0–3	0–0	—

Source: CONCACAF
Rules for classification: Tiebreakers
(H) Hosts; (P) Promoted; (R) Relegated
24 September 2026
15:00

Puerto Rico	0–1	Guyana
	Report	De Rosario 78' (pen.)

Windsor Park, Roseau (Dominica)
Attendance: 200
Referee: Reginald Gumbs (Saint Kitts and Nevis)
24 September 2026
20:00

Cayman Islands	0–0	Dominica
	Report

Windsor Park, Roseau (Dominica)
Referee: Sanchez Bass (Saint Kitts and Nevis)

27 September 2026
15:00

Guyana	2–0	Cayman Islands
Gordon 16'; De Rosario 36'	Report

Windsor Park, Roseau (Dominica)
Attendance: 200
Referee: Kimbell Ward (Saint Kitts and Nevis)
27 September 2026
20:00

Dominica	0–2	Puerto Rico
	Report	Sulia 4'; W. Rivera 37'

Windsor Park, Roseau
Attendance: 2,131
Referee: Norberto Da Silva (Curaçao)

1 October 2026
17:00

Dominica	1–5	Guyana
Jules 75'	Report	De Rosario 27'; Glasgow 41'; Moore 50'; Benjamin 79'; George 90'

Mayagüez Athletics Stadium, Mayagüez (Puerto Rico)
Referee: Nikolai Nyron (Trinidad and Tobago)
1 October 2026
20:00

Cayman Islands	0–3	Puerto Rico
	Report	R. Rivera 26'; W. Rivera 45'; Antonetti 90+3' (pen.)

Mayagüez Athletics Stadium, Mayagüez (Puerto Rico)
Attendance: 1,565
Referee: Benjamín Pineda (Costa Rica)

4 October 2026
15:00

Guyana	8–1	Dominica
Glasgow 5', 33'; Moore 18', 57'; Bonds 24', 75'; Kellman 53'; George 69'	Report	Cuffy 67'

Mayagüez Athletics Stadium, Mayagüez (Puerto Rico)
Attendance: 75
Referee: Steffon Dewar (Jamaica)
4 October 2026
18:00

Puerto Rico	1–0	Cayman Islands
De León 64'	Report

Mayagüez Athletics Stadium, Mayagüez (Puerto Rico)
Attendance: 1,755
Referee: Julio Luna (Guatemala)

12 November 2026
14:00 (15:00 UTC−4)

Cayman Islands	0–6	Guyana
	Report	Glasgow 5' (pen.); Ferrier 13'; De Rosario 39' (pen.); Duke-McKenna 42', 48'; Ferguson 50'

Leonora National Track and Field Centre, Georgetown (Guyana)
Referee: Reon Radix (Grenada)
13 November 2026
14:00 (15:00 UTC−4)

Puerto Rico	4–2	Dominica
R. Rivera 38' (pen.); W. Rivera 56'; Díaz 83'; Rosario 87'	Report	Sharpe 77'; Cuffy 90+1'

Leonora National Track and Field Centre, Georgetown (Guyana)
Referee: Victor Rivas (United States)

16 November 2026
14:00 (15:00 UTC−4)

Guyana	4–2	Puerto Rico
I. Jones 51'; De Rosario 59' (pen.); Duke-McKenna 73'; Moore 76'	Report	W. Rivera 14'; R. Rivera 75'

Leonora National Track and Field Centre, Georgetown (Guyana)
Referee: Kwinsi Williams (Trinidad and Tobago)
17 November 2026
14:00 (15:00 UTC−4)

Dominica	5–0	Cayman Islands
Carbon 33'; Sharpe 63'; Jeremy 65'; Cuffy 72', 77'	Report

Leonora National Track and Field Centre, Georgetown (Guyana)
Referee: Ismael Cornejo (El Salvador)

=== Group B ===
Pos	Team	Pld	W	D	L	GF	GA	GD	Pts	Qualification or relegation	(Saint Lucia)	(Guadeloupe)	(Barbados)	(Bermuda)
1	Saint Lucia (H, P)	6	5	0	1	13	5	+8	15	Promotion to League A, qualification for Gold Cup, and advance to semi-finals	—	3–0	2–0	5–2
2	Guadeloupe (H)	6	3	1	2	11	8	+3	10		0–1	—	2–2	4–1
3	Barbados (H)	6	3	1	2	10	9	+1	10		2–0	0–3	—	4–1
4	Bermuda (R)	6	0	0	6	7	19	−12	0	Relegation to League C	1–2	1–2	1–2	—

Source: CONCACAF
Rules for classification: Tiebreakers
(H) Hosts; (P) Promoted; (R) Relegated
25 September 2026
15:00

Bermuda	1–2	Guadeloupe
Russell 18' (pen.)	Report	Vulgaire 84'; Boisné 89'

Daren Sammy Cricket Ground, Gros Islet (Saint Lucia)
Referee: Shemroy Alie (Antigua and Barbuda)
25 September 2026
20:00

Barbados	2–0	Saint Lucia
Gale 8' (pen.); Reid-Stephen 73'	Report

Daren Sammy Cricket Ground, Gros Islet (Saint Lucia)
Attendance: 774
Referee: Deily Gómez (Costa Rica)

28 September 2026
15:00

Guadeloupe	2–2	Barbados
Boisné 49', 90+1'	Report	Gale 76'; Reid-Stephen 78'

Daren Sammy Cricket Ground, Gros Islet (Saint Lucia)
Attendance: 189
Referee: Cristhofer Corado (Guatemala)
28 September 2026
20:00

Saint Lucia	5–2	Bermuda
Caull 15', 18', 35'; Byron 53'; Frederick 68'	Report	Burchall 45+1'; Robinson 70'

Daren Sammy Cricket Ground, Gros Islet
Attendance: 897
Referee: Brayan Cruz (Costa Rica)

2 October 2026
15:00

Saint Lucia	3–0	Guadeloupe
Elva 18' (pen.); Jude-Boyd 35'; Phillip 57'	Report

Wildey Turf, Wildey (Barbados)
Attendance: 36
Referee: Adrián Lage (Cuba)
2 October 2026
20:00

Barbados	4–1	Bermuda
Gale 26', 41'; Applewhaite 29'; Reid-Stephen 86'	Report	Parfitt-Williams 8'

Wildey Turf, Wildey
Attendance: 1,100
Referee: Eric de la Cruz (Cuba)

5 October 2026
15:00

Guadeloupe	0–1	Saint Lucia
	Report	Caull 5'

Wildey Turf, Wildey (Barbados)
Attendance: 17
Referee: Shekiel Jokil (Suriname)
5 October 2026
20:00

Bermuda	1–2	Barbados
Parfitt-Williams 75'	Report	Gale 79', 82'

Wildey Turf, Wildey (Barbados)
Attendance: 591
Referee: Sergio Rozenhaut (Suriname)

12 November 2026
14:00 (15:00 UTC−4)

Barbados	0–3	Guadeloupe
	Report	Beauvue 10'; Plumain 41'; Gamby 80'

Stade Roger Zami, Le Gosier (Guadeloupe)
Referee: Steven Madrigal (Costa Rica)
13 November 2026
14:00 (15:00 UTC−4)

Bermuda	1–2	Saint Lucia
Tucker 48'	Report	Byron 6', 54'

Stade Roger Zami, Le Gosier (Guadeloupe)
Referee: Ricangel de Leça (Aruba)

16 November 2026
14:00 (15:00 UTC−4)

Guadeloupe	4–1	Bermuda
Giblaca 7'; Beauvue 57'; Boisné 85' (pen.); Mirval 90+1'	Report	Parfitt-Williams 75'

Stade Roger Zami, Le Gosier (Guadeloupe)
Attendance: 900
Referee: Pierre-Luc Lauzière (Canada)
17 November 2026
14:00 (15:00 UTC−4)

Saint Lucia	2–0	Barbados
Byron 20'; St. Romain 87'	Report

Stade Roger Zami, Le Gosier (Guadeloupe)
Attendance: 70
Referee: Mendy Pierre (Martinique)

=== Group C ===
Pos	Team	Pld	W	D	L	GF	GA	GD	Pts	Qualification or relegation	(Cuba)	(Saint Kitts and Nevis)	(Grenada)	(Bonaire)
1	Cuba (H, P)	6	4	2	0	26	6	+20	14	Promotion to League A, qualification for Gold Cup, and advance to semi-finals	—	2–2	9–0	2–0
2	Saint Kitts and Nevis (H)	6	3	2	1	12	9	+3	11		3–3	—	3–0	3–2
3	Grenada	6	2	0	4	7	23	−16	6		0–3	3–2	—	1–4
4	Bonaire (R)	6	1	0	5	10	18	−8	3	Relegation to League C	1–7	1–2	2–3	—

Source: CONCACAF
Rules for classification: Tiebreakers
(H) Hosts; (P) Promoted; (R) Relegated
25 September 2026
17:00

Grenada	0–3	Cuba
	Report	Sandiford 19' (o.g.); Díaz 90+1'; Reinoso 90+4'

SKNFA Technical Center, Basseterre (Saint Kitts and Nevis)
Attendance: 328
Referee: Patrick Sénécharles (Haiti)
25 September 2026
20:00

Bonaire	1–2	Saint Kitts and Nevis
Sonnenschein 7'	Report	Williams 36', 89'

SKNFA Technical Center, Basseterre (Saint Kitts and Nevis)
Attendance: 696
Referee: Karen Hernández (Mexico)

28 September 2026
17:00

Cuba	2–0	Bonaire
Matos 3'; Catasus 49'	Report

SKNFA Technical Center, Basseterre (Saint Kitts and Nevis)
Attendance: 139
Referee: Christopher Mason (Jamaica)
28 September 2026
20:00

Saint Kitts and Nevis	3–0	Grenada
Williams 11', 17', 76' (pen.)	Report

SKNFA Technical Center, Basseterre
Attendance: 633
Referee: Jefferson Escobar (Honduras)

2 October 2026
17:00

Saint Kitts and Nevis	3–3	Cuba
Kelly 26'; Simpson 82'; Williams 88'	Report	Y. Pérez 29', 51'; Catasus 38'

Hasely Crawford Stadium, Port of Spain (Trinidad and Tobago)
Attendance: 75
Referee: Guido Gonzales Jr. (United States)
2 October 2026
20:00

Bonaire	2–3	Grenada
Cicilia 7'; Bostdorp 33'	Report	Hippolyte 50' (pen.); Ettienne 55'; Redhead 69'

Hasely Crawford Stadium, Port of Spain (Trinidad and Tobago)
Attendance: 116
Referee: Moeth Gaymes (Saint Vincent and the Grenadines)

5 October 2026
17:00

Cuba	2–2	Saint Kitts and Nevis
Y. Pérez 25'; Díaz 90'	Report	Williams 16', 63' (pen.)

Hasely Crawford Stadium, Port of Spain (Trinidad and Tobago)
Attendance: 79
Referee: Randy Encarnación (Dominican Republic)
5 October 2026
20:00

Grenada	1–4	Bonaire
Ettienne 11'	Report	Martijn 13'; Sonnenschein 59'; Bostdorp 67'; Cicilia 83'

Hasely Crawford Stadium, Port of Spain (Trinidad and Tobago)
Attendance: 135
Referee: Jorge Leira (Panama)

12 November 2026
14:00 (15:00 UTC−4)

Bonaire	1–7	Cuba
Bostdorp 58'	Report	Camejo 7'; Aguirre 51'; Y. Pérez 56'; Díaz 69', 77'; Paradela 74'; Reinoso 79'

Estadio La Polar, Havana (Cuba)
Referee: Jefferson Escobar (Honduras)
13 November 2026
14:00 (15:00 UTC−4)

Grenada	3–2	Saint Kitts and Nevis
Ettienne 34'; Valcin 50'; Sylvester 52'	Report	Williams 12', 63'

Estadio La Polar, Havana (Cuba)
Referee: Andrew Samuel (Trinidad and Tobago)

16 November 2026
14:00 (15:00 UTC−4)

Cuba	9–0	Grenada
Nebreda 5'; Aguirre 19', 40'; Bravo 42'; Camejo 49'; Reyes 55'; Campos 67'; K. Pérez 81'; Díaz 88'	Report

Estadio La Polar, Havana (Cuba)
Attendance: 1,391
Referee: Jorge Leira (Panama)
17 November 2026
14:00 (15:00 UTC−4)

Saint Kitts and Nevis	3–2	Bonaire
Panayiotou 43'; Williams 49' (pen.), 74'	Report	Bostdorp 28'; Anthony 36'

Estadio La Polar, Havana (Cuba)
Attendance: 87
Referee: Selvin Brown (Honduras)

=== Group D ===
Pos	Team	Pld	W	D	L	GF	GA	GD	Pts	Qualification or relegation	(Saint Vincent and the Grenadines)	(French Guiana)	(Belize)	(Sint Maarten)
1	Saint Vincent and the Grenadines (H, P)	6	5	0	1	12	4	+8	15	Promotion to League A, qualification for Gold Cup, and advance to semi-finals	—	2–1	1–0	4–0
2	French Guiana (H)	6	5	0	1	11	3	+8	15	Qualification for Gold Cup prelims	1–0	—	1–0	1–0
3	Belize (H)	6	1	0	5	2	7	−5	3		0–1	0–2	—	1–2
4	Sint Maarten (R)	6	1	0	5	5	16	−11	3	Relegation to League C	2–4	1–5	0–1	—

Source: CONCACAF
Rules for classification: Tiebreakers
(H) Hosts; (P) Promoted; (R) Relegated
26 September 2026
17:00 (15:00 UTC−6)

Saint Vincent and the Grenadines	2–1	French Guiana
Anderson 14', 29'	Report	Nozile 63'

FFB Stadium, Belmopan (Belize)
Referee: Félix Mojica (Nicaragua)
26 September 2026
22:00 (20:00 UTC−6)

Sint Maarten	0–1	Belize
	Report	Guerra 52'

FFB Stadium, Belmopan (Belize)
Attendance: 583
Referee: Natalie Simon (United States)

29 September 2026
17:00 (15:00 UTC−6)

French Guiana	1–0	Sint Maarten
Haabo 90+5'	Report

FFB Stadium, Belmopan (Belize)
Referee: Raúl Castro (Honduras)
29 September 2026
22:00 (20:00 UTC−6)

Belize	0–1	Saint Vincent and the Grenadines
	Report	Johnson 10'

FFB Stadium, Belmopan
Attendance: 538
Referee: Orlando Alvarado (Guatemala)

3 October 2026
17:00 (15:00 UTC−6)

Sint Maarten	2–4	Saint Vincent and the Grenadines
De Nooijer 74'; Christina 82'	Report	Anderson 11', 24', 57'; Hughes 34' (o.g.)

FFB Stadium, Belmopan (Belize)
Referee: Jorge Ojeda (Nicaragua)
3 October 2026
22:00 (20:00 UTC−6)

Belize	0–2	French Guiana
	Report	Anakaba 78'; Haabo 84'

FFB Stadium, Belmopan
Attendance: 553
Referee: Richard Tejada (Panama)

6 October 2026
17:00 (15:00 UTC−6)

Saint Vincent and the Grenadines	4–0	Sint Maarten
Anderson 21'; Spring 40'; Solomon 44'; M. Stewart 73'	Report

FFB Stadium, Belmopan (Belize)
Referee: Filiberto Martinez (El Salvador)
6 October 2026
22:00 (20:00 UTC−6)

French Guiana	1–0	Belize
Nozile 84'	Report

FFB Stadium, Belmopan (Belize)
Referee: Waldir García (El Salvador)

14 November 2026
14:00 (15:00 UTC−4)

Sint Maarten	1–5	French Guiana
Lake 24'	Report	Nozile 30'; Haabo 36'; Vancaeyezeele 48'; Soga 85'; Sarrucco 88'

Arnos Vale Stadium, Kingstown (Saint Vincent and the Grenadines)
Referee: Richard Tejada (Panama)
14 November 2026
19:00 (20:00 UTC−4)

Saint Vincent and the Grenadines	1–0	Belize
C. Stewart 35'	Report

Arnos Vale Stadium, Kingstown (Saint Vincent and the Grenadines)
Attendance: 4,453
Referee: Daniel Quintero (Mexico)

17 November 2026
14:00 (15:00 UTC−4)

Belize	1–2	Sint Maarten
Guerra 77' (pen.)	Report	Lake 40'; Martina 53'

Arnos Vale Stadium, Kingstown (Saint Vincent and the Grenadines)
Referee: Víctor Cáceres (Mexico)
17 November 2026
19:00 (20:00 UTC−4)

French Guiana	1–0	Saint Vincent and the Grenadines
Monimofou 24'	Report

Arnos Vale Stadium, Kingstown (Saint Vincent and the Grenadines)
Referee: Lukasz Szpala (United States)

=== Ranking of second-placed teams ===
Pos	Grp	Team	Pld	W	D	L	GF	GA	GD	Pts	Qualification
1	D	French Guiana	6	5	0	1	11	3	+8	15	Qualification for Gold Cup prelims
2	A	Puerto Rico	6	4	0	2	12	7	+5	12	Qualification for Gold Cup prelims
3	C	Saint Kitts and Nevis	6	3	2	1	12	9	+3	11	
4	B	Guadeloupe	6	3	1	2	11	8	+3	10	

Source: CONCACAF
Rules for classification: Tiebreakers

== Finals ==
=== Bracket ===
Semi-finals
26 March 2027 – TBD
Guyana
Cuba
26 March 2027 – TBD
Saint Lucia
Saint Vincent and the Grenadines

Final
29 March 2027 – TBD
Winner SF1
Winner SF2
Third place play-off
29 March 2027 – TBD
Loser SF1
Loser SF2

== Goalscorers ==
There have been 176 goals scored in 48 matches, for an average of 3.67 goals per match (as of 17 November 2026).

12 goals

- (Saint Kitts and Nevis) Tiquanny Williams

6 goals

- (Barbados) Thierry Gale
- (Saint Vincent and the Grenadines) Oalex Anderson

5 goals

- (Cuba) Daniel Díaz
- (Guyana) Osaze De Rosario

4 goals

- (Bonaire) Myron Bostdorp
- (Cuba) Yunior Pérez
- (Dominica) Reon Cuffy
- (Guadeloupe) Djamalee Boisné
- (Guyana) Omari Glasgow
- (Guyana) Deon Moore
- (Puerto Rico) Wilfredo Rivera
- (Saint Lucia) Shevon Byron
- (Saint Lucia) Kegan Caull

3 goals

- (Barbados) Niall Reid-Stephen
- (Bermuda) Djair Parfitt-Williams
- (Cuba) Jorge Aguirre
- (French Guiana) Jules Haabo
- (French Guiana) Yvelin Nozile
- (Grenada) Benjamin Ettienne
- (Guyana) Stephen Duke-McKenna
- (Puerto Rico) Ricardo Rivera

2 goals

- (Belize) Nahjib Guerra
- (Bonaire) Ayrton Cicilia
- (Bonaire) Berry Sonnenschein
- (Cuba) Michael Camejo
- (Cuba) Diego Catasus
- (Cuba) Didier Reinoso
- (Dominica) Malachi Sharpe
- (Guadeloupe) Claudio Beauvue
- (Guyana) Elliot Bonds
- (Guyana) Enoch George
- (Sint Maarten) Gerwin Lake

1 goal

- (Barbados) Andre Applewhaite
- (Bermuda) Ajani Burchall
- (Bermuda) Riley Robinson
- (Bermuda) Enrique Russell
- (Bermuda) Ne-Jai Tucker
- (Bonaire) Thierry Anthony
- (Bonaire) Rowendley Martijn
- (Cuba) Pedro Bravo
- (Cuba) Marcos Campos
- (Cuba) Yasniel Matos
- (Cuba) Eloy Nebreda
- (Cuba) Luis Paradela
- (Cuba) Karel Pérez
- (Cuba) Dairon Reyes
- (Dominica) Jayden Carbon
- (Dominica) Theo Jeremy
- (Dominica) Troy Jules
- (French Guiana) Guy Anakaba
- (French Guiana) Jean-Yves Monimofou
- (French Guiana) Joel Sarrucco
- (French Guiana) Calvin Soga
- (French Guiana) Thomas Vancaeyezeele
- (Guadeloupe) Jonathan Gamby
- (Guadeloupe) Kendy Giblaca
- (Guadeloupe) Raphaël Mirval
- (Guadeloupe) Ange-Freddy Plumain
- (Guadeloupe) Allan Vulgaire
- (Grenada) Myles Hippolyte
- (Grenada) Caleb Redhead
- (Grenada) Narshon Sylvester
- (Grenada) Vijay Valcin
- (Guyana) Kelsey Benjamin
- (Guyana) Nathan Ferguson
- (Guyana) Morgan Ferrier
- (Guyana) Liam Gordon
- (Guyana) Isaiah Jones
- (Guyana) Curtez Kellman
- (Puerto Rico) Leandro Antonetti
- (Puerto Rico) Gerald Díaz
- (Puerto Rico) Adrián Rosario
- (Puerto Rico) Jeremy de León
- (Puerto Rico) Rodolfo Sulia
- (Saint Kitts and Nevis) Kyle Kelly
- (Saint Kitts and Nevis) Harry Panayiotou
- (Saint Kitts and Nevis) Tyreece Simpson
- (Saint Lucia) Caniggia Elva
- (Saint Lucia) Kurt Frederick
- (Saint Lucia) Arkell Jude-Boyd
- (Saint Lucia) Donavan Phillip
- (Saint Lucia) Mervin St. Romain
- (Saint Vincent and the Grenadines) Andrew Johnson
- (Saint Vincent and the Grenadines) Azinho Solomon
- (Saint Vincent and the Grenadines) Diel Spring
- (Saint Vincent and the Grenadines) Cornelius Stewart
- (Saint Vincent and the Grenadines) Malcolm Stewart
- (Sint Maarten) Quinton Christina
- (Sint Maarten) Jeffterick Martina
- (Sint Maarten) Mitchell de Nooijer

1 own goal

- (Grenada) Greg Sandiford (against Cuba)
- (Sint Maarten) Sergio Hughes (against Saint Vincent and the Grenadines)
