= 2008 in association football =

The following are the association football events of the year 2008 throughout the world.

== News ==
=== January ===
- 3 – Argentine midfielder Éver Banega leaves Boca Juniors and joins the Spanish club Valencia for an estimated fee of €18 million.
- 5 – Everton are knocked out of the FA Cup in the third round by Oldham Athletic, a team from Football League One (third division) as Huddersfield Town from the same division beat Birmingham City.
- 6 – Toulouse are eliminated from the Coupe de France by Paris FC, a team from the Championnat National (third division).
- 9 – Sam Allardyce leaves the manager's position at Newcastle United by mutual agreement.
- 11 – Jürgen Klinsmann is unveiled as the new coach of Bayern Munich, effective July.
- 20 – The Africa Cup of Nations begins in Ghana with the hosts beating Guinea 2–1.
- 23 – Tottenham Hotspur defeat Arsenal 5–1 in the semi-final second-leg of the League Cup. This was the first time they had beaten their local rivals since 1999.
- 24 – George Burley is announced as the new coach of the Scotland national football team.
- 28 – Mohamed Sissoko leaves Liverpool to sign for Juventus, costing the Italian team €13 million.

=== February ===
- 2 – Frédéric Kanouté is named 2007 African Footballer of the Year
- 4 – Víctor Muñoz is sacked from the managers job of Spanish team Recreativo Huelva; Manolo Zambrano is immediately installed as the new coach of the La Liga team.
- 10 – Egypt win the 2008 Africa Cup of Nations after beating Cameroon in the final 1–0.
- 13 – Giovanni Trapattoni is announced as the new coach of the Republic of Ireland. He will officially take up this role in May.
- 23 – South Korean men's team won East Asian Cup 2008.
- 23 – Japanese J. League Cup winner Gamba Osaka defeated MLS champion Houston Dynamo at the final game of Pan-Pacific Championship 2008 by 6–1, won the champion title of inaugural tournament. The Los Angeles Galaxy won the third place match against Sydney FC from A-league by 2–1.
- 24 – Japan won the Women's East Asian Cup 2008 with three straight wins over South Korea, North Korea, and China.
- 24 – Tottenham Hotspur win the Football League Cup after beating Chelsea 2–1 after extra time at Wembley Stadium.
- 24 – Newcastle Jets win the Hyundai A-League Grand Final by defeating the Central Coast Mariners by 1–0 at the Sydney Football Stadium.

=== March ===
- 11 – Newport County win the FAW Premier Cup beating Llanelli 1–0 in the final.
- 12 – The United States women's national soccer team wins the 2008 Algarve Cup for the sixth time, beating Denmark 2–1 in the final.
- 16 – Rangers win the Scottish League Cup by beating Dundee United 3–2 in a penalty shootout after a 2–2 draw at Hampden Park.

=== May ===
- 5 – Real Madrid wins the 31st La Liga title after beating Osasuna 2–1.
- 8 – Announced that Frank Rijkaard would leave his managerial post at Barcelona at the end of the season, to be replaced by Barcelona B coach Pep Guardiola.
- 11 – Manchester United wins its tenth Premier League title after beating Wigan Athletic 2–0 away.
- 17 – Portsmouth wins the 127th FA Cup after beating Cardiff City 1–0 at Wembley Stadium
- 21 – Manchester United won the UEFA Champions League after beating Chelsea 6–5 on penalties after a 1–1 draw after 90 minutes in Moscow
- 22 – Celtic win the SPL title for the third successive season by three points from Rangers on the final day.
- 24 – Avram Grant is sacked as Chelsea manager after just eight months in charge of the Premier League club.

=== June ===
- 2 – José Mourinho replaces Roberto Mancini as manager of Inter Milan
- 25 – LDU Quito won the first leg of the Copa Libertadores final beating Fluminense 4–2.
- 29 – Spain wins UEFA Euro 2008 after beating Germany 1–0 in the final.

=== July ===
- 1 – Luiz Felipe Scolari becomes the new manager of Chelsea.
- 2 – LDU Quito wins the Copa Libertadores beating Fluminense in penalties 3–1 after a 5–5 aggregate draw.

=== August ===
- 8 – Scottish Premier League team Gretna are formally liquidated.
- 21 – United States women's team win gold at the 2008 Summer Olympics
- 23 – Argentina's men's team win gold at the 2008 Summer Olympics

=== September ===
- 1 – Manchester City sign Robinho from Real Madrid for a British record fee of £32.5 million
- 1 – Manchester United sign Dimitar Berbatov from Tottenham Hotspur for £30.75 million.
- 4 – Kevin Keegan resigns as manager of Newcastle United.

== International tournaments ==
=== Men ===
- 20 January – 10 February: 2008 Africa Cup of Nations in Ghana
  - (gold) : Egypt
  - (silver) : Cameroon
  - (bronze) : Ghana
  - 4th: Ivory Coast
- 17 – 23 February: Men's East Asian Cup 2008 final in Chongqing, China
  - (gold) : South Korea
  - (silver) : Japan
  - (bronze) : China
  - 4th: North Korea
- 11 – 23 March: 2008 CONCACAF Men's Pre-Olympic Tournament in Nashville, United States
  - (gold) : Honduras
  - (silver) : United States
  - (bronze) : Canada
  - 4th: Guatemala
- 4 – 16 May: 2008 UEFA European Under-17 Football Championship in Turkey
  - (gold) : Spain
  - (silver) : France
  - (bronze) : Turkey and Netherlands
- 7 – 29 June: UEFA Euro 2008 in Austria and Switzerland
  - (gold) : Spain
  - (silver) : Germany
  - (bronze) : Turkey and Russia
- 30 May – 1 June: Baltic Cup in Riga, Latvia
  - (gold) : Latvia
  - (silver) : Lithuania
  - (bronze) : Estonia
- 3 – 14 June: 2008 SAFF Championship in Maldives and Sri Lanka
  - (gold) : Maldives
  - (silver) : India
- 30 July – 13 August: AFC Challenge Cup, India
  - (gold) : India
  - (silver) : Tajikistan
  - (bronze) : North Korea
  - 4th: Myanmar
- 7 – 23 August: 2008 Summer Olympics – Men's tournament in Beijing, China
  - (gold) : Argentina
  - (silver) : Nigeria
  - (bronze) : Brazil
- 5 – 28 December: 2008 AFF Championship in Indonesia and Thailand
  - (gold) : Vietnam
  - (silver) : Thailand
  - (bronze) : Indonesia,Singapore

=== Women ===
- 18 – 24 February: Women's East Asian Cup 2008 final in Chongqing, China
  - (gold) : Japan
  - (silver) : North Korea
  - (bronze) : China
  - 4th: South Korea
- 5 – 12 March: 2008 Algarve Cup in Algarve, Portugal
  - (gold) : United States
  - (silver) : Denmark
  - (bronze) : Norway
  - 4th: Germany
- 6 – 21 August: 2008 Summer Olympics – Women's tournament in Beijing, China
  - (gold) : United States
  - (silver) : Brazil
  - (bronze) : Germany
- 30 October – 16 November: 2008 FIFA U-17 Women's World Cup in New Zealand
  - (gold) : North Korea
  - (silver) : United States
  - (bronze) : Germany
  - 4th: England
- 20 November – 7 December: 2008 FIFA U-20 Women's World Cup in Chile
  - (gold) : United States
  - (silver) : North Korea
  - (bronze) : Germany
  - 4th: France

== National champions ==
=== AFC nations ===
- (Australia) A-League: Newcastle Jets
- (Bahrain) Bahraini Premier League: Muharraq Club
- (China) Chinese Super League: Shandong Luneng
- Hong Kong First Division League: South China
- (India) I-League: Dempo SC
- Liga Indonesia Premier Division: Sriwijaya
- (Iran) Persian Gulf Cup: Persepolis F.C.
- (Japan) J. League: Kashima Antlers
- (South Korea) K-League: Suwon Samsung Bluewings
- (Lebanon) Lebanese Premier League: Al Ahed
- (Saudi Arabia) Saudi Premier League: Al-Hilal
- (Philippines) Filipino Premier League: Philippine Army F.C.
- (Malaysia) Malaysian Super League: Kedah FA
- Qatar Stars League: Al-Gharafa Sports Club
- S-League: Singapore Armed Forces Football Club
- Thailand Premier League: Provincial Electricity Authority FC
- Turkmenistan Higher League: FC Aşgabat
- (Chinese Taipei) Enterprise Football League: Taipower
- (United Arab Emirates) UAE Football League: Al-Shabab
- (Uzbekistan) Uzbek League: Bunyodkor
- (Vietnam) V-League: Becamex Bình Dương

=== UEFA nations ===
- (Albania) Albanian Superliga: Dinamo Tirana
- (Andorra) Campionat de Lliga: Santa Coloma
- (Armenia) Armenian Premier League: Pyunik
- (Austria) Austrian Bundesliga: Rapid Wien
- Azerbaijan Premier League: Inter Baku
- (Belarus) Belarusian Premier League: BATE Borisov
- (Belgium) Belgian Pro League: Standard Liège
- Premier League of Bosnia and Herzegovina: Modriča
- (Bulgaria) Bulgarian A PFG: CSKA Sofia
- (Croatia) Prva HNL: Dinamo Zagreb
- (Cyprus) Cypriot First Division: Anorthosis Famagusta
- (Czech Republic) Gambrinus Liga: Slavia Prague
- (Denmark) Danish Superliga: Aalborg BK
- (England) Premier League: Manchester United
- (Estonia) Meistriliiga: Levadia Tallinn
- (Faroe Islands) Formuladeildin: EB/Streymur
- (Finland) Veikkausliiga: Inter Turku
- (France) Ligue 1: Lyon
- (Georgia (country)) Umaglesi Liga: Dinamo Tbilisi
- (Germany) Bundesliga: Bayern Munich
- Super League Greece: Olympiacos
- (Hungary) Hungarian National Championship I: MTK Budapest
- (Iceland) Úrvalsdeild: FH Hafnarfjörður
- (Republic of Ireland) League of Ireland Premier Division: Bohemian
- (Israel) Ligat ha'Al: Beitar Jerusalem
- (Italy) Serie A: Inter Milan
- Kazakhstan Premier League: Aktobe
- (Latvia) Latvian Higher League: Ventspils
- (Lithuania) A Lyga: Ekranas
- Luxembourg National Division: F91 Dudelange
- (North Macedonia) Macedonian Prva Liga: Rabotnički
- (Malta) Maltese Premier League: Valletta
- (Moldova) Moldovan National Division: Sheriff Tiraspol
- (Montenegro) Montenegrin First League: Budućnost Podgorica
- (Netherlands) Eredivisie: PSV
- (Northern Ireland) Irish Premier League: Linfield
- (Norway) Norwegian Premier League: Stabæk
- (Poland) Ekstraklasa: Wisła Kraków
- (Portugal) Primeira Liga: Porto
- (Romania) Liga I: CFR Cluj
- (Russia) Russian Premier League: Rubin Kazan
- (San Marino) Campionato Sammarinese di Calcio: Murata
- (Scotland) Scottish Premier League: Celtic
- (Serbia) Serbian Superliga: Partizan
- (Slovakia) Slovak Superliga: Artmedia Bratislava
- (Slovenia) Slovenian PrvaLiga: NK Domžale
- (Spain) La Liga: Real Madrid
- (Sweden) Allsvenskan: Kalmar
- (Switzerland) Swiss Super League: Basel
- (Turkey) Süper Lig: Galatasaray
- (Ukraine) Ukrainian Premier League: Shakhtar Donetsk
- (Wales) Welsh Premier League: Llanelli

=== CAF nations ===
- (Algeria) Algerian Championnat National: JS Kabylie
- (Angola) Girabola: Petro Atlético Luanda
- (Botswana) Mascom Premier League: Centre Chiefs
- (Burkina Faso) Burkinabé Premier League: Etoile Filante Ouagadougou
- Burundi Premier League: Inter Star
- (Cameroon) MTN Elite one: Cotonsport Garoua
- (Cape Verde) Cape Verdean football Championships: Sporting Clube da Praia
- Chad Premier League: Elect Sport N'Djamena
- Comoros Premier League: Etoile d'Or
- (Republic of the Congo) Congo Premier League: CARA Brazzaville
- (Democratic Republic of the Congo) Linafoot: DC Motema Pembe
- (Ivory Coast) Côte d'Ivoire Premier Division: Africa Sports National
- Djibouti Premier League: Société Immobilière de Djibouti
- (Egypt) Egyptian Premier League: Al-Ahly
- (Eritrea) Eritrean Premier League: Asmara Brewery
- (Ethiopia) Ethiopian Premier League: Saint-George SA
- Gabon Championnat National D1: AS Mangasport
- (The Gambia) Gambian Championnat National D1: Wallidan
- (Ghana) OneTouch Premier League: Asante Kotoko
- (Guinea) Guinée Championnat National: Fello Star
- (Guinea-Bissau) Campeonato Nacional da Guiné-Bissau: Sporting Clube de Batafá
- (Kenya) Kenyan Premier League: Mathare United
- Lesotho Premier League: Lesotho Correctional Services
- (Liberia) Liberian Premier League: Black Star
- (Libya) Libyan Premier League: Al Ittihad
- (Madagascar) THB Champions League: Académie Ny Antsika
- Malawi Premier Division: Silver Strikers
- (Mali) Malien Première Division: Djoliba
- (Mauritania) Mauritanean Premier League: ASAC Concorde
- (Mauritius) Mauritian League: Curepipe Starlight
- (Morocco) Botola: FAR Rabat
- (Mozambique) Moçambola: Ferroviario de Maputo
- Namibia Premier League: Orlando Pirates Windhoek
- Niger Premier League: AS Police
- (Nigeria) Nigerian Premier League: Kano Pillars
- Réunion Premier League: JS Saint-Pierroise
- (Rwanda) Rwandan Premier League: ATRACO
- Senegal Premier League: AS Douanes
- Seychelles League: Saint-Michel United
- Sierra Leone National Premier League: Ports Authority F.C.
- Somalia League: Elman FC
- (South Africa) Premier Soccer League: SuperSport United
- Sudan Premier League: Al-Merrikh
- (Eswatini) Swazi Premier League: Royal Leopards
- (Tanzania) Tanzanian Premier League: Young Africans
- (Tunisia) Tunisian CLP-1: Club Africain
- (Uganda) Ugandan Super League: Kampala City Council
- (Zambia) Zambian Premier League: ZESCO United
- Zanzibar Premier League: Miembeni
- Zimbabwe Premier Soccer League: Monomotapa United

=== CONMEBOL nations ===
- Primera División Argentina: River Plate (C) / Boca Juniors (A)
- (Bolivia) Liga de Fútbol Profesional Boliviano: Universitario (A) / Aurura (C)
- (Brazil) Campeonato Brasileiro Série A: São Paulo
- Primera División de Chile: Everton (A) / Colo-Colo (C)
- (Colombia) Colombian Professional Football: Boyacá Chicó (A) / América de Cali (C)
- Serie A de Ecuador: Deportivo Quito
- Primera División de Paraguay: Libertad (A) (C)
- (Peru) Primera División Peruana: U. San Martín
- (Uruguay) Primera División Uruguaya: Defensor Sporting
- (Venezuela) Primera División Venezolana: Deportivo Táchira

(A = Apertura, C= Clausura)

=== CONCACAF nations ===
- (The Bahamas) BFA Senior League: IM Bears
- (Barbados) Digicel Premiere League: Notre Date Sports Club
- Belize Premier Football League: Hankook Verdes
- (Bermuda) Bermudian Premier Division: PHC Zebras
- British Virgin Islands Championship: Islanders
- (Canada) Canadian Soccer League: Trois-Rivières Attak
- Cayman Islands League: Scholars International
- Primera División de Costa Rica: Saprissa (A) (C)
- Campeonato Nacional de Fútbol de Cuba: Cienfuegos
- Dominica Championship: Centre Bath Estate
- Primera División de Fútbol de El Salvador: Firpo (C) / Isidro Metapán (A)
- Liga Nacional de Fútbol de Guatemala: Comunicaciones (C) (A)
- Grenada League: Carib Hurricane
- (Haiti) Ligue Haïtienne: Racing Gonaïves (C) / Tempête (A)
- Liga Nacional de Fútbol de Honduras: Marathón (C) / Olimpia (A)
- (Jamaica) National Premier League: Portmore United
- (Mexico) Primera División de México: Santos Laguna (C) / Toluca (A)
- Nevis Premier Division: SL Horsford Highlights
- Primera División de Nicaragua: Real Estelí
- (Panama) Liga Panameña de Fútbol: Árabe Unido (C) / San Francisco (A)
- Puerto Rico Soccer League: Sevilla
- (Saint Kitts and Nevis) Saint Kitts Premier Division: Newtown United
- Saint Lucia Premier Division: Aux Lyons United
- (Saint Vincent and the Grenadines) NLA Premier League: Avenues United
- Sint Maarten League: D&P Connection
- (Suriname) Surinamese Hoofdklasse: Inter Moengotapoe
- (Trinidad and Tobago) TT Pro League: San Juan Jabloteh
- (Turks and Caicos Islands) MFL League: Beaches
- (United States) Major League Soccer: Columbus Crew
- (United States Virgin Islands) US Virgin Islands Championship: Positive Vibes

(A = Apertura, C= Clausura)

=== OFC nations ===
- Football Federation American Samoa Soccer League: Pago Youth
- Cook Islands Round Cup: Nikao Sokattack
- (Fiji) Fijian National Football League: Ba
- (Federated States of Micronesia) FSMFA Top League: Yap
- Kiribati National Championship: competition canceled
- New Caledonia Division Honneur: AS Magenta
- (New Zealand) ASB Premiership: Waitakere United
- Niue Soccer Tournament: Talava
- Norfolk Island Soccer League: unknown
- Palau Soccer League: Surangel & Sons Company
- Papua New Guinea National Soccer League: PRK Hekari United
- Samoa National League: Sinamoga
- Solomon Islands National Club Championship: Koloale
- (French Polynesia) Tahiti Division Fédérale: AS Manu-Ura
- Tonga Major League: Lotoha'apai
- Tuvalu A-Division: Nauti
- Vanuatu Premia Divisen: Tafea

== Deaths ==
=== January ===
- 1 January – Božidar Sandić (85), Serbian footballer, Yugoslavia international
- 4 January – Vyacheslav Ambartsumyan (67), Russian footballer, Soviet Union international
- 4 January – Bjørn Odmar Andersen (64), Norwegian international footballer and manager
- 5 January – Louis Hon (83), French international footballer
- 9 January – Paul Aimson (64), English footballer
- 11 January – Frank Loughran (77), Australian international footballer
- 12 January – Leszek Jezierski (78), Polish footballer and manager
- 13 January – Seyran Osipov (46), Russian footballer
- 14 January – Kaj Christiansen (86), Danish international footballer and manager
- 14 January – Johnny Steele (91), English footballer and manager
- 18 January – Wally Fielding (88), English footballer
- 21 January – Billy Elliott (82), English international footballer
- 24 January – Jorge Recio (66), Argentine international footballer
- 26 January – Celestino Celio (82), Italian international footballer and manager
- 27 January – Bengt Lindskog (74), Swedish international footballer
- 28 January – Eleuterio Santos (67), Spanish international footballer

=== February ===
- 1 February – Władysław Kawula (70), Polish footballer
- 2 February – Yiu Cheuk Yin (80), Hong Kong footballer
- 9 February – Guy Tchingoma (22), Gabonese footballer
- 10 February – Ove Jørstad (37), Norwegian footballer
- 12 February – Jean Prouff (88), French footballer and manager
- 12 February – Thomas Grosser (42), German footballer
- 14 February – Len Boyd (84), English footballer
- 15 February – Inge Thun (62), Norwegian footballer
- 17 February – Brian Harris (72), English footballer and manager
- 21 February – Emmanuel Sanon (56), Haitian footballer

=== March ===
- 2 March – Carl Hoddle (40), English footballer
- 4 March – Jocelyne Henry (54), French footballer
- 5 March – Derek Dooley (78), English footballer and manager
- 25 March – Thierry Gilardi (49), French commentator

=== April ===
- 3 April – Hrvoje Ćustić (24), Croatian footballer
- 5 April – Wang Donglei (23), Chinese footballer
- 18 April – Erminio Favalli (64), Italian footballer
- 19 April – Constant Vanden Stock (93), Belgian footballer, manager, and executive

=== May ===
- 8 May – François Sterchele (26), Belgian footballer
- 10 May – Eusebio Ríos (73), Spanish footballer and manager
- 15 May – Tommy Burns (51), Scottish former footballer and manager
- 23 May – Heinrich Kwiatkowski (81), German footballer

=== June ===
- 6 June – Victor Wégria (71), Belgian footballer
- 11 June – Adam Ledwoń (34), Polish footballer
- 22 June – Ron Stitfall (82), Welsh footballer

=== July ===
- 13 July – Rudolf Nafziger (62), German footballer
- 15 July – Gionata Mingozzi (23), Italian footballer
- 18 July – George Niven (79), Scottish footballer

=== August ===
- 3 August – Anton Allemann (72), Swiss footballer

=== September ===
- 3 September – Joan Segarra (80), Spanish defender
- 4 September – Tommy Johnston (81), Scottish footballer
- 25 September – Jimmy Sirrel (86), Scottish football player and manager

=== October ===
- October 8 - Chicão, Brazilian midfielder, semi-finalist at the 1978 FIFA World Cup. (59)
- October 21 - George Edwards (87), Welsh footballer
- October 25 - Ian McColl (81), Scottish football player and manager

=== November ===
- 1 November – Dermot Curtis (76), Irish football player and manager
- 17 November – Peter Aldis (81), English footballer
- 27 November – Gil Heron (87), Jamaican footballer

=== December ===
- 8 December – John Cumming (78), Scottish footballer
- 9 December – Dražan Jerković (72), Croatian football player and manager
- 9 December – Ibrahim Dossey (36), Ghanaian footballer
- 12 December – Maksym Pashayev (20), Ukrainian footballer
