= 2016–17 N1 League =

N1 League
- Season: 2016–17
- Champions: Horsford Highlights

The 2016–17 N1 League was the ninth season of the N1 League and the first year the competition was branded as N1 League. Seven clubs participated in the competition following a two-season hiatus. The teams played in an unknown length regular season that began on 29 October 2016 and ended on 19 February 2017.

The top four clubs based on their regular season standings qualified for the Final Four segment of the tournament, which determined the champion of the season. The semifinals were played in a two-leg aggregate series, while the championship round was played in a best two-of-three series.

Defending champions, Highlights won the title, winning the series 2-0 against Youths of the Future in the final. It was Highlights' fifth Nevisian title.

== Teams ==
- Bath United
- Bronx United
- Hardtimes
- Highlights
- Stoney Grove Strikers
- Villa International United
- Youths of the Future

== Table ==
This was the last reported table on 13 December 2016.

1.SLH Highlights International          6   5  1  0  18- 0  16
2.Youths of the Future                  6   3  1  2  10- 6  10
3.CCC Bath United                       5   3  0  2  20-12   9
4.BG Stoney Grove Strikers              5   2  2  1   9- 3   8
5. Hardtimes                             5   2  1  2  17-10   7
6.Bronx United                          5   0  1  4   6-28   1
7.Villa International United            4   0  0  4   1-21   0

== Final four ==
=== Bracket ===
Final Four; 1/5 Mar 2017
Hard Times	1	0	1
Youths of the Future(a)	1	0	1
Highlights	3	0	3
Stoney Grove Strikers	1	0	1

N1 Championship; 8/15 Mar 2017
Youths of the Future	1	2	3
Highlights	4	4	8

== See also ==
- 2016–17 SKNFA Super League
