= Myron Bostdorp =

Bonaire footballer

Personal information
- Date of birth: 15 November 2002 (age 24)
- Place of birth: Rotterdam, Netherlands
- Height: 1.80 m (5 ft 11 in)
- Positions: Midfielder; forward

Team information
- Current team: HSV Hoek
- Number: 11

Youth career
- –2021: XerxesDZB
- 2021–2023: Twente

Senior career*
Years	Team	Apps	(Gls)
2024–2025	XerxesDZB		
2025–2026	Roosendaal	34	(15)
2026–	HSV Hoek	10	(1)

International career^{‡}
2026–	Bonaire	6	(4)
- * Club domestic league appearances and goals as of 15:09, 13 November 2026 (UTC) ‡ National team caps and goals as of 13:08, 18 November 2026 (UTC)

Myron Bostdorp (born 15 November 2002) is a Bonairean footballer who currently plays for HSV Hoek and the Bonaire national team.

== Club career ==
Born in Rotterdam, Bostdorp played for the academies of Spartaan'20, Sparta Rotterdam, and XerxesDZB as a youth. In 2021, he left XerxesDZB and joined the academy of FC Twente. After two years with the club, he was released without breaking into the first team. Bostdorp was told by FC Twente management at the time that they already had too many contracted players in his position so there was no longer a place for him at the club. Following his departure, Bostdorp had trials at Bocholt VV in Belgium and TOP Oss in addition to holding talks with AEK Athens and clubs from Scandinavia. When no other deal materialized, he returned to his former club XerxesDZB in January 2024. It was at this time that the player made his professional first-team debut.

Bostdorp remained with Xeres for two additional seasons until he impressed the management of RBC Roosendaal during a play-off final and joined the club the following season. In January 2026, it was announced that Bostdorp had signed a two-year contract extension with RBC Roosendaal. However, following a standout season in which he scored thirteen league goals, the player was transferred to HSV Hoek of the Tweede Divisie for an undisclosed fee the following May. The player then signed a two-year deal with the club.

== International career ==
Bostdorp represents Bonaire internationally. He was called up to the senior national team for the first time in September 2026 for 2026–27 CONCACAF Nations League B matches against Saint Kitts and Nevis and Cuba. He made his senior debut on 25 September 2026 in the match against Saint Kitts and Nevis. Bostdorp scored his first international goal for Bonaire on 2 October 2026 in a match against Grenada in the same competition.

=== International goals ===
Scores and results list Bonaire's goal tally first.

No.	Date	Venue	Opponent	Score	Result	Competition
1	2 October 2026	Hasely Crawford Stadium, Port of Spain, Trinidad and Tobago	Grenada	2–1	2–3	2026–27 CONCACAF Nations League B
2	5 October 2026	Hasely Crawford Stadium, Port of Spain, Trinidad and Tobago	Grenada	3–1	4–1	2026–27 CONCACAF Nations League B
3	12 November 2026	Estadio La Polar, Havana, Cuba	Cuba	1–3	1–7	2026–27 CONCACAF Nations League B
4	17 October 2026	Estadio La Polar, Havana, Cuba	Saint Kitts and Nevis	1–0	2–3	2026–27 CONCACAF Nations League B
Last updated 13 November 2026 2026

=== International career statistics ===
As of match played 17 November 2026.

Bonaire
Year	Apps	Goals
2026	6	4
Total	6	4
