= Jal'den Myers =

Saint Kitts and Nevis footballer

Personal information
- Full name: Jal'den Myers
- Date of birth: 15 September 2003 (age 23)
- Position: Defender

Team information
- Current team: Bath United

Senior career*
Years	Team	Apps	(Gls)
2019–	Bath United	69	(8)

International career^{‡}
2022	Saint Kitts and Nevis U20	3	(0)
2023–	Saint Kitts and Nevis	7	(0)
- * Club domestic league appearances and goals as of 18 November 2025 ‡ National team caps and goals as of 18 November 2025

Jal'den Myers (born 15 September 2003) is a Saint Kitts and Nevis footballer who plays as a defender for Bath United and the Saint Kitts and Nevis national football team.

== Club career ==
Myers plays domestically for Bath United in Saint Kitts and Nevis. His senior career with the club has been recorded from the 2019–20 season.

In April 2023, Myers scored an own goal for Bath United in a 1–1 draw against Security Forces FC, before earning and converting a penalty in the same match. In May 2023, he scored a penalty in an 82nd-minute equaliser as Bath United drew 1–1 with Cayon Rockets at the Nevis Athletics Stadium.

In June 2023, Myers scored for Bath United against Conaree FC, giving his side an early lead in an eventual 3–2 defeat.

In March 2024, he scored from the penalty spot in a 3–1 victory over Trafalgar Southstars in the National Bank Group of Companies Premier League. In June 2025, he scored a 76th-minute equaliser for Bath United in a 2–2 draw against Mantab in the NBGC Premier League.

== International career ==
=== Youth ===
Myers represented Saint Kitts and Nevis at under-20 level. He was named in the squad for the 2022 CONCACAF U-20 Championship in Honduras. He made three appearances for Saint Kitts and Nevis U20 during the tournament.

=== Senior ===
Myers was selected for the Saint Kitts and Nevis senior national team in September 2023 for CONCACAF Nations League matches.

He was again included in the squad for Nations League matches against Sint Maarten in October 2023. He made his senior international debut against Sint Maarten on 12 October 2023.

In May 2024, Myers was included in the Saint Kitts and Nevis squad for 2026 FIFA World Cup qualification matches against Costa Rica and the Bahamas.

== Career statistics ==
=== Club ===
As of 18 November 2025.

Appearances and goals by club, season and competition
Club	Season	League	Apps	Goals
Bath United	2021–22	SKNFA Premier League	20	1
Bath United	2023	SKNFA Premier League	19	5
Bath United	2024	SKNFA Premier League	15	1
Bath United	2025	SKNFA Premier League	15	1
Total			69	8

=== International ===
As of 18 November 2025.

Appearances and goals by national team
National team	Years	Apps	Goals
Saint Kitts and Nevis	2023–	7	0
