= Pioneers F.C. =

Pioneers F.C. may refer to:

- Pioneers F.C., a Saint Lucia Gold Division team
- Pioneers F.C. (Dublin), a former League of Ireland team
- Pioneers FC (Nevis), a N1 League team
