= Saint Kitts and Nevis national football team =

Saint Kitts and Nevis
- Nickname: The Sugar Boyz
- Association: St. Kitts and Nevis Football Association (SKNFA)
- Confederation: CONCACAF (North America)
- Sub-confederation: CFU (Caribbean)
- Head coach: Marcelo Serrano
- Captain: Julani Archibald
- Most caps: Julani Archibald; Gerard Williams (85)
- Top scorer: Keith Gumbs; Tiquanny Williams (24)
- Home stadium: Warner Park
- FIFA code: SKN
| First colours | Second colours | Third colours |

FIFA ranking
- Current: 151 ▲1 (7 October 2026)
- Highest: 73 (October 2016, March 2017)
- Lowest: 176 (November 1994)

First international
- (British Leeward Islands) Saint Christopher and Nevis 2–4 Grenada (Saint Christopher and Nevis; 18 August 1938)

Biggest win
- Saint Kitts and Nevis 10–0 Montserrat (Basseterre, Saint Kitts and Nevis; 17 April 1992); Saint Martin 0–10 Saint Kitts and Nevis (The Valley, Anguilla; 14 October 2018)

Biggest defeat
- Mexico 8–0 Saint Kitts and Nevis (Monterrey, Mexico; 17 November 2004)

CONCACAF Gold Cup
- Appearances: 1 (first in 2023)
- Best result: Group stage (2023)
Medal record
Caribbean Cup
| Silver medal – second place | 1997 Antigua and Barbuda and Saint Kitts and Nevis | Team |

The Saint Kitts and Nevis national football team is the national team of Saint Kitts and Nevis, and is controlled by the St. Kitts and Nevis Football Association. They are affiliated to the Caribbean Football Union of CONCACAF. The team has never qualified for the FIFA World Cup, however, they did qualify for their first CONCACAF Gold Cup appearance in 2023.

They are nicknamed The Sugar Boyz due to the sugar cultivation on the island of St. Kitts.

== History ==
=== Beginnings (1938–1990) ===
Saint Kitts and Nevis played their first match on 18 August 1938, against Grenada, a match that ended in a 2–4 defeat. They participated in the Leeward Islands Tournament from 1949 however had to wait until 1979 to play their first official matches, in the qualifying rounds for the 1979 CFU Championship, losing twice to Jamaica, both results finishing 2–1. They would again fail to qualify for the final phase of the 1983 CFU Championship after advancing due to Jamaica's withdrawal, eliminated by Martinique, who won 12–0 on aggregate.

=== 1990–2000 ===
The Sugar Boyz qualified for their first tournament at the 1993 Caribbean Cup, drawing against Dominican Republic (2–2) and British Virgin Islands (5–1) to top their qualifying group. In the tournament proper, they finished second behind Jamaica to reach the semi-finals, before losing to Martinique on penalties. In the match for third place, they were defeated 3–2 by Trinidad and Tobago. Saint Kitts and Nevis finished bottom of their group in 1996 but in the 1997 Caribbean Cup, they advanced into the knock-out after finishing level on points with both Trinidad and Tobago and Martinique, then defeated Grenada 2–1 in extra-time with both goals scored by Keith Gumbs, but they succumbed to Trinidad and Tobago 0–4 in the final. Since they'd reached the final, Saint Kitts and Nevis were entered into a play-off against Cuba – runner-up in the 1996 Caribbean Cup – for the last ticket to the 1998 CONCACAF Gold Cup, but they lost 2–0.

Saint Kitts and Nevis participated for the first time in the 1998 FIFA World Cup qualifiers. After benefiting from the withdrawal of the Bahamas, they beat Saint Lucia 5–1 in Basseterre and 1–0 in Castries, but fell in the third knockout round against Saint Vincent and the Grenadines, losing thanks to the away goals rule.

=== 2000s ===
In the 2002 World Cup qualifiers, after comfortably beating the Turks and Caicos Islands with an aggregate result of 14–0, Saint Vincent and the Grenadines once again dispatched the Sugar Boyz, winning both in Kingstown (1–0) as in Basseterre (1–2). However, the situation would improve in the 2006 qualifiers, since Saint Kitts and Nevis advanced to the second group phase after leaving the US Virgin Islands and Barbados on the way. They shared Group 3 with Mexico, Trinidad and Tobago and Saint Vincent and the Grenadines, but as expected, finished in last place, with 6 losses in as many appearances. They also experienced the worst defeat in their history, 8–0 against Mexico. In the preliminary round for the 2010 qualifiers, they were unable to repeat what they had done four years ago and were unceremoniously eliminated by Belize, who won 4–2 on aggregate.

In the Caribbean Cup, the Sugar Boyz did not repeat the successes of the '90s and could only qualify to the final phase of the 2001 Caribbean Cup, although they did not advance beyond the group phase. They have not returned to a final phase since that edition.

=== 2010–present ===
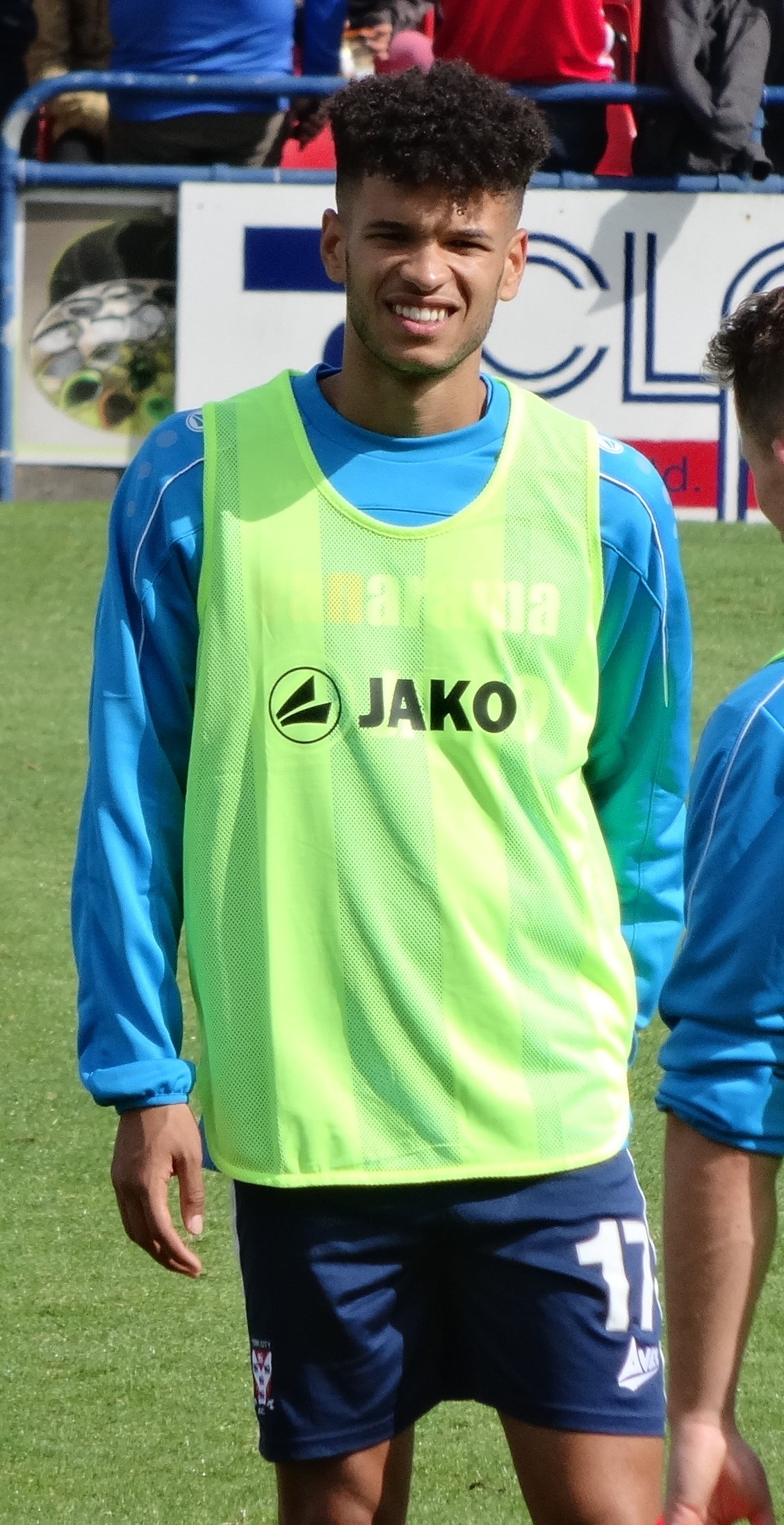
Theo Wharton made his debut for St. Kitts and Nevis in 2016

Qualifying directly to the second round of the 2014 qualifiers, Saint Kitts and Nevis was drawn in Group D along with Canada, Puerto Rico and Saint Lucia. They finished in 3rd place, with 7 points. It was only defeated by Canada in Toronto (4–0). In the 2018 World Cup qualifiers, Saint Kitts and Nevis defeated the Turks and Caicos Islands in the first round by a lofty aggregate 12–4 before falling in the second phase, at the hands of El Salvador, 6–3 on aggregate, but not before obtaining a 2–2 draw at home. In November 2015, they played 2 friendlies against European teams, Andorra (1–0) and Estonia (0–3). Devaughn Elliott scored the only goal in the victory over Andorra, becoming the first St. Kitts and Nevis player to score against a European side. The result was also the first away victory for a CFU team over a European side on their home soil.

In October 2016, it reached its highest ranking in the FIFA world ranking (73rd place) thanks to its good performance in the 2nd round of the 2017 Caribbean Cup of Nations qualifiers. However, two defeats against French Guiana (0–1) and Haiti at home (0–2 a.e.t.) stopped the Sugar Boyz in the 3rd round of these qualifiers. The year ends with a 1–1 draw in Basseterre against Estonia on November 19, 2016, in a friendly match, one year after playing against the same team in Tallinn.

In June 2017, the team went on a second European tour and played Armenia on June 4 in Yerevan and Georgia three days later in Tbilisi. Both games ended in equally bad losses, 5–0 and 3–0, respectively. St. Kitts and Nevis continued its pattern of international tours and travels in August 2017 to Mumbai to meet Mauritius and India in a friendly tournament, the 2017 Hero Tri-Nation Series. Both matches ended in draws acquired by the same score of one goal each.

The Sugar Boyz played Andorra again on March 25, 2022, six and a half years after their first confrontation, for a friendly match in Andorra la Vella. This time the Principality's selection won against Saint Kitts and Nevis on its home stadium (1–0).

They qualified for their first ever CONCACAF Gold Cup in 2023.

== Team image ==
=== Kit sponsorship ===
| Kit supplier | Period |
|---|---|
| (United Kingdom) Beaver | 1999 |
| (Italy) L-Sporto | 2004 |
| (Germany) Adidas | 2010–2015 |
| (Canada) Lika | 2016–2019 |
| (United States) Capelli | 2021–present |

== National football stadium ==
| Stadium | Capacity | City |
|---|---|---|
| Warner Park Football Stadium | 3,500 | Basseterre |

== Results and fixtures ==
The following is a list of match results in the last 12 months, as well as any future matches that have been scheduled.

Win Draw Loss Fixture

=== 2025 ===
| 12 November 2025-26 CONCACAF Series | Saint Kitts and Nevis | 0–0 | Sint Maarten | Basseterre, Saint Kitts and Nevis |
| | | Report | | Stadium: SKNFA Technical Center; Referee: Moeth Gaymes (St. Vicent and the Grenadines) |

| 18 November 2025-26 CONCACAF Series | Saint Kitts and Nevis | 2–6 | Belize | Basseterre, Saint Kitts and Nevis |
| | Matthew 71', 85' | Report | Wade 9', 28', 43'; Meza Jr. 80', 82'; Martinez 90+3' | Stadium: SKNFA Technical Center |

=== 2026 ===
| 27 March 2026 FIFA Series | Indonesia | 4–0 | Saint Kitts and Nevis | Jakarta, Indonesia |
| 20:00 UTC+7 | Putra 15', 25'; Romeny 53'; Zijlstra 75' | Report | | Stadium: Gelora Bung Karno Stadium; Attendance: 26,703; Referee: Muhammad Taqi (Singapore) |

| 30 March 2026 FIFA Series | Saint Kitts and Nevis | 4–2 | Solomon Islands | Jakarta, Indonesia |
| 16:45 UTC+7 | Sterling-James 30'; Williams 43'; Kelly 75'; Panayiotou 87' | Report | Keana 36'; Fordney 85' | Stadium: Gelora Bung Karno Stadium; Referee: Thoriq Alkatiri (Indonesia) |
Note: The kickoff of the Saint Kitts & Nevis v Solomon Islands match, originally scheduled for 15:30 local time, was delayed for 75 minutes due to a thunderstorm and unfavorable weather conditions.

| 25 September 2026–27 CONCACAF Nations League B | Bonaire | 1–2 | Saint Kitts and Nevis | Basseterre, Saint Kitts and Nevis |
| 20:00 | Sonnenschein 7' | Report | Williams 36', 89' | Stadium: SKNFA Technical Center, Referee: Karen Hernández (Mexico) |

| 28 September 2026–27 CONCACAF Nations League B | Saint Kitts and Nevis | 3–0 | Grenada | Basseterre, Saint Kitts and Nevis |
| 20:00 | Williams 11', 17', 76' (pen.) | Report | | Stadium: SKNFA Technical Center, Referee: Jefferson Escobar (Honduras) |

| 2 October 2026–27 CONCACAF Nations League League B | Saint Kitts and Nevis | 3–3 | Cuba | Port of Spain, Trinidad and Tobago |
| 17:00 | Kelly 26'; Simpson 82'; Williams 88' | Report | Pérez 29', 51'; Catasus 38' | Stadium: Hasely Crawford Stadium; Attendance: 75; Referee: Guido Gonzales Jr. (United States) |

| 5 October 2026–27 CONCACAF Nations League League B | Cuba | 2–2 | Saint Kitts and Nevis | Port of Spain, Trinidad and Tobago |
| 17:00 | Pérez 25'; Díaz 90' | Report | Williams 16', 63' (pen.) | Stadium: Hasely Crawford Stadium; Referee: Randy Encarnación (Dominican Republic) |

| 13 November 2026–27 CONCACAF Nations League B | Grenada | 3–2 | Saint Kitts and Nevis | Havana, Cuba |
| 14:00 (15:00 UTC−4) | Ettienne 34'; Valcin 50'; Sylvester 52' | Report | Williams 12', 63' | Stadium: Estadio La Polar; Referee: Andrew Samuel (Trinidad and Tobago) |

| 17 November 2026–27 CONCACAF Nations League B | Saint Kitts and Nevis | 3–2 | Bonaire | Havana, Cuba |
| 14:00 (15:00 UTC−4) | Panayiotou 43'; Williams 49' (pen.), 74' | Report | Bostdorp 28'; Anthony 36' | Stadium: Estadio La Polar; Referee: Selvin Brown (Honduras) |

== Coaches ==
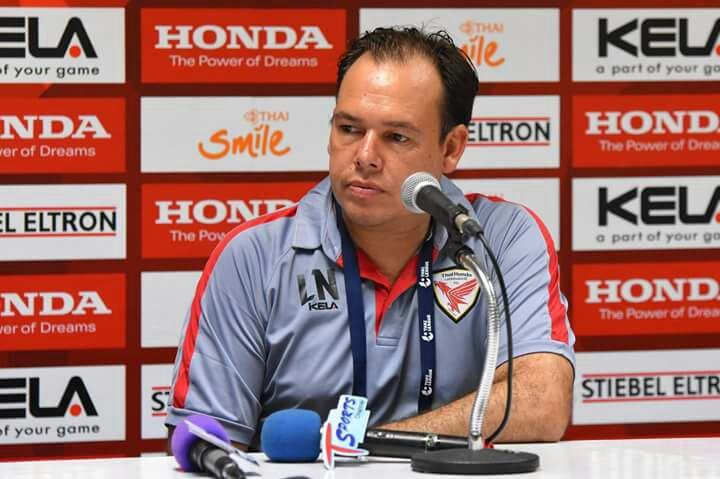
Leonardo Neiva became the manager of St. Kitts and Nevis in 2021

- (Argentina) Carlos Cavagnaro (1988)
- (Saint Kitts and Nevis) Alistair Edwards (1996–1997)
- (Saint Kitts and Nevis) Ces Podd (1999–2000)
- (Saint Kitts and Nevis) Clinton Percival (2000–2001)
- (Saint Kitts and Nevis) Elvis Browne (2002–2004)
- (Saint Kitts and Nevis) Lenny Lake (2004)
- (United States) Leonard Taylor (2008)
- (Saint Kitts and Nevis) Lester Morris (2008)
- (Saint Kitts and Nevis) Lenny Lake (2008–2010)
- (Saint Kitts and Nevis) Clinton Percival (2010–2012)
- (Saint Kitts and Nevis) Jeffrey Hazel (2012–2015)
- (Mexico) Jacques Passy (2015–2019)
- (Saint Kitts and Nevis) Earl Jones (2019)
- (Argentina) Claudio Caimi (2019–2021)
- (Brazil) Leonardo Neiva (2021)
- (Saint Kitts and Nevis) Austin Huggins (2022–2023)
- (Mexico) Francisco Molina (2023–2025)
- (Brazil) Marcelo Serrano (2025–)

== Players ==
=== Current squad ===
The following players were called up for the 2026–27 CONCACAF Nations League matches against Grenada and Bonaire on 13 and 17 November 2026, respectively.

Caps and goals correct as of 17 November 2026, after the match against Bonaire.

| No. | Pos. | Player | Date of birth (age) | Caps | Goals | Club |
|---|---|---|---|---|---|---|
| | GK | Julani Archibald | 18 May 1991 (age 35) | 85 | 0 | (Malta Football Association) Valletta |
| | GK | Xander Parke | 17 November 2003 (age 23) | 0 | 0 | (The Football Association) Hednesford Town |
| | GK | Victor Hart | 15 January 2010 (age 16) | 0 | 0 | (United States Soccer Federation) Colorado Rapids Academy |
| | DF | Malique Roberts | 1 August 2001 (age 25) | 30 | 1 | (St. Kitts and Nevis Football Association) Cayon Rockets |
| | DF | Jordan Bowery | 2 July 1991 (age 35) | 8 | 0 | (The Football Association) Mansfield Town |
| | DF | Ethan Bristow | 27 November 2001 (age 24) | 6 | 1 | (The Football Association) Harrogate Town |
| | DF | Rico Browne | 28 December 2003 (age 22) | 5 | 0 | (The Football Association) Woking |
| | DF | Micaah Garnette | 28 May 2003 (age 23) | 6 | 0 | (Canadian Soccer Association) Whitecaps FC 2 |
| | DF | Luca Crolla | 17 October 2008 (age 18) | 4 | 0 | (The Football Association) Derby County U18 |
| | DF | Jayden Richardson | 4 September 2000 (age 26) | 2 | 0 | (Scottish Football Association) St Mirren |
| | MF | Romaine Sawyers | 2 November 1991 (age 35) | 58 | 8 | Unattached |
| | MF | Omari Sterling-James | 15 September 1993 (age 33) | 39 | 5 | (The Football Association) Hednesford Town |
| | MF | Raheem Somersall | 5 July 1997 (age 29) | 28 | 0 | (United States Soccer Federation) Sporting Club Jacksonville |
| | MF | Kyle Kelly | 16 October 2005 (age 21) | 14 | 2 | (The Football Association) Forest Green Rovers |
| | MF | Marley Mintus | 1 December 2007 (age 18) | 2 | 0 | (The Football Association) Derby County U21 |
| | MF | Erick Riviere | 16 December 2008 (age 17) | 1 | 0 | (United States Soccer Federation) IMG Academy |
| | FW | Harry Panayiotou | 28 October 1994 (age 32) | 47 | 14 | (The Football Association) Hemel Hempstead Town |
| | FW | Tiquanny Williams | 10 September 2001 (age 25) | 36 | 24 | (St. Kitts and Nevis Football Association) Old Road Jets |
| | FW | Savi-K Morton | 1 June 2009 (age 17) | 5 | 0 | (United States Soccer Federation) Kalonji Academy |
| | FW | Keyendrah Simmonds | 31 May 2001 (age 25) | 2 | 0 | Unattached |
| | FW | Okera Simmonds | 25 December 1999 (age 26) | 2 | 0 | (Football Association of Wales) Bala Town |
| | FW | Rakealan Jeffers | 18 February 2005 (age 21) | 0 | 0 | (The Football Association) Matlock Town |

=== Recent call-ups ===
| Pos. | Player | Date of birth (age) | Caps | Goals | Club | Latest call-up |
|---|---|---|---|---|---|---|
| GK | Joshua Warde | 14 August 2001 (age 25) | 0 | 0 | (United States) Georgia Revolution | v. Solomon Islands, 30 March 2026 |
| DF | Dominic Revan | 19 September 2000 (age 26) | 0 | 0 | (England) Salisbury | v. Grenada, 13 November 2026^{PRE} |
| DF | Anwa Springer | 4 April 2002 (age 24) | 8 | 0 | (Saint Kitts and Nevis) Old Road Jets | v. Cuba, 5 October 2026 |
| DF | Daron Thomas | 3 April 2006 (age 20) | 9 | 0 | (Saint Kitts and Nevis) St. Paul's | v. Cuba, 5 October 2026 |
| DF | Andre Burley | 10 September 1999 (age 27) | 28 | 2 | Unattached | v. Cuba, 5 October 2026 |
| DF | Ruben Freeman | 9 September 2000 (age 26) | 3 | 0 | (England) Inkberrow | v. Solomon Islands, 30 March 2026 |
| DF | Lois Maynard | 22 January 1989 (age 37) | 30 | 0 | (England) Radcliffe | v. Solomon Islands, 30 March 2026 |
| DF | Jal'den Myers | 15 September 2003 (age 23) | 7 | 0 | (Saint Kitts and Nevis) Bath United | v. Solomon Islands, 30 March 2026 |
| MF | Jay Williams | 4 October 2000 (age 26) | 0 | 0 | (England) Colchester United | v. Grenada, 13 November 2026^{PRE} |
| MF | Yohannes Mitchum | 6 April 1998 (age 28) | 57 | 1 | (Saint Kitts and Nevis) Cayon Rockets | v. Cuba, 5 October 2026 |
| MF | Nequan Browne | 2 November 1998 (age 28) | 18 | 1 | (Saint Kitts and Nevis) Old Road Jets | v. Cuba, 5 October 2026 |
| MF | Theo Wharton | 15 November 1994 (age 32) | 27 | 2 | (Wales) Barry Town | v. Cuba, 5 October 2026 |
| MF | Jahlyan Burt | 23 October 2003 (age 23) | 5 | 0 | (Saint Kitts and Nevis) Sandy Point | v. Solomon Islands, 30 March 2026 |
| MF | Mervin Lewis | 26 August 2000 (age 26) | 28 | 1 | (Saint Kitts and Nevis) Cayon Rockets | v. Solomon Islands, 30 March 2026 |
| FW | Tyrese Shade | 9 June 2000 (age 26) | 9 | 0 | (England) Portsmouth | v. Grenada, 13 November 2026^{PRE} |
| FW | Tyreece Simpson | 7 February 2002 (age 24) | 6 | 2 | (England) Port Vale | v. Grenada, 13 November 2026^{PRE} |
| FW | G'Vaune Amory | 22 June 1997 (age 29) | 35 | 5 | (Saint Kitts and Nevis) Village Superstars | v. Cuba, 5 October 2026 |
Notes: ^{INJ} = Injured; ^{WD} = Player withdrew from the squad due to non-injury issue; ^{RET} = Retired from the national team; ^{PRE} = Preliminary squad

== Player records ==
As of 17 November 2026
Players in bold are still active with Saint Kitts & Nevis.

=== Most appearances ===
| Rank | Player | Caps | Goals | Career |
|---|---|---|---|---|
| 1 | Gerard Williams | 85 | 2 | 2006–2023 |
| 1 | **Julani Archibald** | 85 | 0 | 2008–present |
| 3 | Thrizen Leader | 76 | 1 | 2004–2021 |
| 4 | **Romaine Sawyers** | 58 | 8 | 2012–present |
| 5 | **Yohannes Mitchum** | 57 | 1 | 2017–present |
| 6 | George Isaac | 53 | 22 | 1996–2011 |
| 7 | Orlando Mitchum | 49 | 6 | 2004–2019 |
| 8 | Jevon Francis | 47 | 23 | 2000–2011 |
| 8 | **Harry Panayiotou** | 47 | 14 | 2014–present |
| 10 | Ian Lake | 46 | 20 | 2002–2012 |

=== Top goalscorers ===
| Rank | Player | Goals | Caps | Ratio | Career |
|---|---|---|---|---|---|
| 1 | **Tiquanny Williams** | 24 | 36 | 0.67 | 2021–present |
| 1 | Keith Gumbs | 24 | 41 | 0.59 | 1993–2011 |
| 3 | Jevon Francis | 23 | 47 | 0.49 | 2000–2011 |
| 4 | George Isaac | 22 | 53 | 0.42 | 1996–2011 |
| 5 | Ian Lake | 20 | 46 | 0.43 | 2002–2012 |
| 6 | **Harry Panayiotou** | 14 | 47 | 0.3 | 2014–present |
| 7 | Austin Huggins | 11 | 36 | 0.31 | 1993–2004 |
| 8 | Atiba Harris | 10 | 42 | 0.24 | 2003–2019 |
| 9 | Alexis Saddler | 9 | 26 | 0.35 | 2000–2011 |
| 9 | **Kimaree Rogers** | 9 | 43 | 0.21 | 2015–present |

== Competitive record ==
=== FIFA World Cup ===
| FIFA World Cup | | | | | | | | | Qualification | | | | | |
| Year | Round | Position | Pld | W | D* | L | GF | GA | Pld | W | D | L | GF | GA |
|---|---|---|---|---|---|---|---|---|---|---|---|---|---|---|
| (Uruguay) 1930 | Part of United Kingdom | | | | | | | | Part of United Kingdom | | | | | |
| 1934 to 1990 | Not a FIFA member | | | | | | | | Not a FIFA member | | | | | |
| (United States) 1994 | Did not enter | | | | | | | | Declined participation | | | | | |
| (France) 1998 | Did not qualify | | | | | | | | 4 | 2 | 2 | 0 | 8 | 3 |
| (South Korea) (Japan) 2002 | Did not qualify | | | | | | | | 4 | 2 | 0 | 2 | 15 | 3 |
| (Germany) 2006 | Did not qualify | | | | | | | | 10 | 4 | 0 | 6 | 18 | 26 |
| (South Africa) 2010 | Did not qualify | | | | | | | | 2 | 0 | 1 | 1 | 2 | 4 |
| (Brazil) 2014 | Did not qualify | | | | | | | | 6 | 1 | 4 | 1 | 6 | 8 |
| (Russia) 2018 | Did not qualify | | | | | | | | 4 | 2 | 1 | 1 | 15 | 10 |
| (Qatar) 2022 | Did not qualify | | | | | | | | 6 | 3 | 0 | 3 | 8 | 8 |
| (Canada) (Mexico) (United States) 2026 | Did not qualify | | | | | | | | 4 | 1 | 0 | 3 | 5 | 13 |
| (Morocco) (Portugal) (Spain) 2030 | To be determined | | | | | | | | To be determined | | | | | |
| (Saudi Arabia) 2034 | To be determined | | | | | | | | To be determined | | | | | |
| Total | – | 0/9 | – | – | – | – | – | – | 40 | 15 | 8 | 17 | 77 | 75 |

=== CONCACAF Gold Cup ===
CONCACAF Gold Cup record
| Year | Round | Position | Pld | W | D | L | GF | GA | Squad |
|---|---|---|---|---|---|---|---|---|---|
| (United States) 1991 | Not eligible | | | | | | | | |
| (Mexico) (United States) 1993 | Did not qualify | | | | | | | | |
| (United States) 1996 | Did not qualify | | | | | | | | |
| (United States) 1998 | Did not qualify | | | | | | | | |
| (United States) 2000 | Did not qualify | | | | | | | | |
| (United States) 2002 | Did not qualify | | | | | | | | |
| (Mexico) (United States) 2003 | Did not qualify | | | | | | | | |
| (United States) 2005 | Did not qualify | | | | | | | | |
| (United States) 2007 | Did not qualify | | | | | | | | |
| (United States) 2009 | Did not qualify | | | | | | | | |
| (United States) 2011 | Did not qualify | | | | | | | | |
| (United States) 2013 | Did not qualify | | | | | | | | |
| (Canada) (United States) 2015 | Did not qualify | | | | | | | | |
| (United States) 2017 | Did not qualify | | | | | | | | |
| (Costa Rica) (Jamaica) (United States) 2019 | Did not qualify | | | | | | | | |
| (United States) 2021 | Did not qualify | | | | | | | | |
| (Canada) (United States) 2023 | Group stage | 16th | 3 | 0 | 0 | 3 | 0 | 14 | Squad |
| (Canada) (United States) 2025 | Did not qualify | | | | | | | | |
| Total | Group stage | 1/18 | 3 | 0 | 0 | 3 | 0 | 14 | – |

=== CONCACAF Nations League ===
CONCACAF Nations League record
| League | | | | | | | | | | Finals | | | | | | | | |
| Season | Division | Group | Pld | W | D | L | GF | GA | P/R | Finals | Result | Pld | W | D | L | GF | GA | Squad |
|---|---|---|---|---|---|---|---|---|---|---|---|---|---|---|---|---|---|---|
| 2019–20 | B | A | 6 | 1 | 2 | 3 | 8 | 8 | ▼ | (United States) 2021 | Ineligible | | | | | | | |
| 2022–23 | C | B | 4 | 3 | 1 | 0 | 9 | 4 | ▲ | (United States) 2023 | Ineligible | | | | | | | |
| 2023–24 | B | A | 6 | 1 | 1 | 4 | 4 | 12 | ▼ | (United States) 2024 | Ineligible | | | | | | | |
| 2024–25 | C | C | 4 | 3 | 1 | 0 | 10 | 3 | ▲ | (United States) 2025 | Ineligible | | | | | | | |
| Total | — | — | 20 | 8 | 5 | 7 | 31 | 27 | — | Total | 0 Titles | — | — | — | — | — | — | — |

=== Caribbean Cup ===
Caribbean Cup record
| Year | Round | Pld | W | D* | L | GF | GA |
|---|---|---|---|---|---|---|---|
| (Barbados) 1989 | Did not qualify | | | | | | |
| (Trinidad and Tobago) 1990 | Did not qualify | | | | | | |
| (Jamaica) 1991 | Did not qualify | | | | | | |
| (Trinidad and Tobago) 1992 | Did not qualify | | | | | | |
| (Jamaica) 1993 | Fourth place | 5 | 2 | 1 | 2 | 16 | 8 |
| (Trinidad and Tobago) 1994 | Did not qualify | | | | | | |
| (Cayman Islands) (Jamaica) 1995 | Did not qualify | | | | | | |
| (Trinidad and Tobago) 1996 | Group stage | 3 | 0 | 1 | 2 | 3 | 10 |
| (Antigua and Barbuda) (Saint Kitts and Nevis) 1997 | Runners-up | 4 | 2 | 0 | 2 | 4 | 8 |
| (Trinidad and Tobago) (Jamaica) 1998 | Did not qualify | | | | | | |
| (Trinidad and Tobago) 1999 | Group stage | 3 | 0 | 0 | 3 | 0 | 9 |
| (Trinidad and Tobago) 2001 | Group stage | 3 | 1 | 1 | 1 | 7 | 8 |
| (Barbados) 2005 | Did not qualify | | | | | | |
| (Trinidad and Tobago) 2007 | Did not qualify | | | | | | |
| (Jamaica) 2008 | Did not qualify | | | | | | |
| (Martinique) 2010 | Did not qualify | | | | | | |
| (Antigua and Barbuda) 2012 | Did not qualify | | | | | | |
| (Jamaica) 2014 | Did not qualify | | | | | | |
| (Martinique) 2017 | Did not qualify | | | | | | |
| Total | 5/18 | 18 | 5 | 3 | 10 | 26 | 43 |

== Honours ==
=== Regional ===
- Caribbean Cup
  - (silver) Runners-up (1): 1997

=== Friendly ===
- FIFA Series
  - (bronze) Third Place (1): 2026
