= 2013–14 Nevis Premier Division =

Nevis Premier Division
- Season: 2013–14
- Champions: Horsford Highlights
- CFU Club Championship: None
- Matches: 22 known

The 2013–14 Nevis Premier Division was the 10th, and most recent season of the Nevis Premier Division.

== Playoffs ==
=== Semifinal round ===
1 February 2014

| Horsford Highlights | 8–2 | Allstars |

ET Willett Park, Nevis
2 February 2014

| Bath United | 1–1 | SSG Strikers |

ET Willett Park, Nevis

4 February 2014

| SSG Strikers | 0–1 | Horsford Highlights |

ET Willett Park, Nevis
4 February 2014

| Bath United | 12–0 | Allstars |

ET Willett Park, Nevis

=== Consolation match ===
10 February 2014

| Allstars | 2–5 | SSG Strikers |

ET Willett Park, Nevis
16 February 2014

| SSG Strikers | 3–0 (w/o) | Allstars |
|---|---|---|
| | forfeit |

ET Willett Park, Nevis

SSG Strikers won 8–2 on aggregate.

=== Finals ===
10 February 2014

| Bath United | Cancelled | Horsford Highlights |

ET Willett Park, Nevis
16 February 2014

| Horsford Highlights | 3–3 (a.e.t.) | Bath United |
|---|---|---|
| | Report |
Penalties
| | 3–1 |

ET Willett Park, Nevis

Horsford Highlights 3–3 Bath United. Horsford Highlights win 3–1 on penalties.
