= Lenny Lake =

Saint Kitts and Nevis football manager

Personal information
- Place of birth: Saint Kitts and Nevis

Managerial career
- Years: Team
- 2004: Saint Kitts and Nevis
- 2008–2010: Saint Kitts and Nevis

Lenny Lake is a Saint Kitts and Nevis professional football manager.

In 2004 and from October 2008 to August 2010 he coached the Saint Kitts and Nevis national football team.
