= Claudio Caimi =

Argentine football manager

Personal information
- Full name: Claudio Caimi
- Date of birth: 7 August 1967 (age 59)
- Place of birth: Buenos Aires, Argentina
- Positions: Forward; midfielder

Senior career*
Years	Team	Apps	(Gls)
1985–1990	Excursionistas		
1990–1992	KSV Roeselare		
1992–1993	Mouscron		
1993–1994	KSV Roeselare		
1994–1995	Hapoel Beit She'an		
1995–1996	Maccabi Herzliya		
1996–1997	Maccabi Kiryat Gat		

Managerial career
- 2019–2021: St. Kitts and Nevis
- * Club domestic league appearances and goals

Claudio Norberto Caimi (born 7 August 1967), is an Argentinian football coach and former player who most recently coached the St. Kitts and Nevis national team.
