= Kyle Kelly =

Kittitian footballer (born 2005)

Personal information
- Full name: Kyle Damian Kelly
- Date of birth: 16 October 2005 (age 21)
- Place of birth: Northampton, England
- Position: Midfielder

Team information
- Current team: Forest Green Rovers (on loan from Liverpool)

Youth career
- 2018–: Liverpool

Senior career*
Years	Team	Apps	(Gls)
2026–	Liverpool	0	(0)
2026–	→ Forest Green Rovers (loan)	11	(2)

International career^{‡}
2024–	Saint Kitts and Nevis	14	(2)
Medal record
Men's football
Representing Saint Kitts and Nevis
FIFA Series
Bronze medal – third place	2026 Indonesia
- * Club domestic league appearances and goals as of 22:57, 15 September 2026 (UTC) ‡ National team caps and goals as of 16:54, 17 November 2026 (UTC)

Kyle Damian Kelly (born 16 October 2005) is a professional footballer who plays as a midfielder for National League club Forest Green Rovers, on loan from Premier League club Liverpool. Born in England, he plays for the Saint Kitts and Nevis national team.

== Club career ==
Kelly joined the youth academy of Liverpool in 2018. While playing in the academy, Kelly worked as a ballboy for first team games at Anfield.

In September 2020, he signed his first trainee contract with the club, and on 24 October 2022 signed a professional contract with Liverpool. In February 2024, he was promoted to the Liverpool U21s. Despite having interest from other clubs, in 2025, he signed a new contract with Liverpool despite his previous season being curtailed by injury. He started playing for Liverpool U-21s in their Football League Trophy matches in the 2025-26 season.

On 22 July 2026, Kelly signed for National League side Forest Green Rovers on loan until the end of 2026.

== International career ==
Born in England, Kelly is of Nevisian descent. He is a former youth international for England, having played for the England U15s. On 20 March 2024, he debuted for the Saint Kitts and Nevis national team as a substitute in a 3–1 friendly win over San Marino.

Kelly was first approached by the Saint Kitts and Nevis Football Association after they noticed on his Instagram that he stated he was from Saint Kitts. He was eligible through both his parents being from Saint Kitts and Nevis. He made his international debut before making his club debut for Liverpool.

Kelly scored his first international goal on 31 March 2026, in a 4–2 FIFA Series win over Solomon Islands at Gelora Bung Karno Stadium, Indonesia. The goal received coverage worldwide.

=== International goals ===
Scores and results list Saint Kitts and Nevis' goal tally first. Score column lists the score after each Kelly goal.

No.	Date	Venue	Opponent	Score	Result	Competition
1.	30 March 2026	Gelora Bung Karno Stadium, Jakarta, Indonesia	Solomon Islands	3–1	4–2	2026 FIFA Series
2.	2 October 2026	Hasely Crawford Stadium, Port of Spain, Trinidad and Tobago	Cuba	1–0	3–3	2026–27 CONCACAF Nations League

== Honours ==
Saint Kitts and Nevis

- FIFA Series third place: 2026
