= Giovanni Campari =

Italian football manager

Personal information
- Date of birth: 10 January 1927
- Place of birth: Reggio nell'Emilia, Italy
- Date of death: 7 October 2016 (aged 89)

Managerial career
- Years: Team
- 1973–1974: Reggiana
- 1974–1977: Ravenna
- 1977–1978: Melfi
- 1978–1979: Fasano
- 1979–1980: Bisceglie
- 1980–1981: Trani
- 1981–1982: Fidelis Andria
- 1990–1996: Cuba

Giovanni Campari (10 January 1927 – 7 October 2016) was an Italian football manager.

== Career ==
In 1990, he was appointed manager of the Cuba national football team. He first managed the team during a 1-1 draw against the Jamaica national football team. He helped them obtain sports clothes.

== Personal life ==
Campari was born in 1927 in Italy. He was described as "professional... wise, experienced, a true football teacher".
