= Malachi Sharpe =

Dominica footballer

Personal information
- Date of birth: 20 November 2005 (age 20)
- Place of birth: Nottingham, England
- Height: 1.76 m (5 ft 9 in)
- Position: Midfielder

Youth career
- —2014: Basford United
- 2014–2021: Derby County
- 2021–2026: Manchester United
- 2026: Burnley

International career^{‡}
Years	Team	Apps	(Gls)
2021	Scotland U17	3	(1)
2023	Scotland U19	6	(1)
2026–	Dominica	2	(2)
- ‡ National team caps and goals as of 18:23, 17 November 2026 (UTC)

Malachi Sharpe (born 20 November 2005) is an association footballer who most recently played for the academy of Premier League club Burnley, and the Dominica national team.

== Club career ==
Born in Nottingham, Sharpe began his footballing career with local club Basford United. After being invited to trials with Nottingham Forest, Notts County, and Derby County, he ultimately chose to join Derby County because of the quality of its academy, making the move at age nine. At age thirteen, he became the youngest player to sign a scholarship with the club and by age fourteen he was training with the first team under head coach Philip Cocu. By 2021, Sharpe was targeted by Manchester United with the player accepting the club's second offer and transferring that year.

By age fifteen, Sharpe was competing in the Under-18 Premier League for Manchester United. In 2022, he signed his first professional contract with the club. He missed part of the 2023 because of injury, but rebounded to become a standout performer later that year. His performances included three goals in his first six league matches of the season and minutes in the 2023–24 UEFA Youth League.

In summer 2026, Sharpe left Manchester United at the expiry of his contract, ending his five-year tenure at the club which included several injuries. Anticipating that he would not be re-signed by Manchester United, he trialed at Burnley in March 2026, prior to his release. During his time with Burnley, he appeared for the club's under-21 side in league play. In May and June 2026, he went on trial with Blackburn Rovers and Colchester United, respectively.

== International career ==
Born in England, Sharpe also qualifies to represent Scotland, Jamaica, and Dominica internationally. In September 2021, he was called up to the Scotland U17 team for 2022 UEFA European Under-17 Championship qualification. He went on to score in a 3–2 victory over Northern Ireland on his debut. He would go on to earn three caps during the qualifying campaign. In 2023, he was called up by Scotland again, this time for 2024 UEFA European Under-19 Championship qualification. His performances included a goal in a 3–1 victory over Andorra.

In November 2026, Sharpe was called up to the senior Dominica national team for the first time for 2026–27 CONCACAF Nations League B matches against Puerto Rico and the Cayman Islands. He made his senior international debut on 13 November in the match against Puerto Rico. He scored his first international goal in the eventual 2–4 defeat.

=== International goals ===
Scores and results list Dominica's goal tally first.

No.	Date	Venue	Opponent	Score	Result	Competition
1.	13 November 2026	Synthetic Track and Field Facility, Leonora, Guyana	Puerto Rico	1–2	2–4	2026–27 CONCACAF Nations League B
2.	17 November 2026	Synthetic Track and Field Facility, Leonora, Guyana	Cayman Islands	2–0	5–0	2026–27 CONCACAF Nations League B
Last updated 18 November 2026

=== International career statistics ===
As of match played 17 November 2026.

Dominica
Year	Apps	Goals
2026	2	2
Total	2	2

== Personal ==
Sharpe is the first cousin (once removed) of former England international Viv Anderson.
