= 2017–18 N1 League =

N1 League
- Season: 2017–18

The 2017–18 N1 League was the tenth season of the N1 League, the top division of football in Nevis, one of the two islands of Saint Kitts and Nevis, and the second year the competition was branded as N1 League. The season started in November 2017, but was abandoned in March following disagreements between Youths of the Future and the FA.

== Regular season ==
Table on 15 March 2018 (before abandoned).

1.Youths of the Future                  6   6  0  0  19- 5  18
2. Hard Times FC                         8   4  1  3  26-12  13
3.Pioneers FC                           7   3  1  3  10-12  10
4.SL Highlights International           7   3  0  4   8-18   9 
- - - - - - - - - - - - - - - - - - - - - - - - - - - - - - - -   
5.Villa United FC                       6   2  0  4   5-12   6
6.Bath United FC                        6   1  0  5   8-17   3

== See also ==
- 2017–18 SKNFA Super League
