= Clinton Percival =

Saint Kitts and Nevis football manager

Personal information
- Place of birth: Saint Kitts and Nevis

Team information
- Current team: British Virgin Islands U20

Managerial career
- Years: Team
- 2000–2001: Saint Kitts and Nevis
- 2010–2012: Saint Kitts and Nevis
- 2020–: British Virgin Islands U20

Clinton 'Tinnie' Percival is a Saint Kitts and Nevis professional football manager. From 2000 to 2001 and from August 2010 to August 2012 he coached the Saint Kitts and Nevis national football team.
