= Jeffrey Hazel =

Saint Kitts and Nevis football manager

Personal information
- Date of birth: 20 September 1979 (age 47)
- Place of birth: Basseterre, Saint Kitts and Nevis

Managerial career
- Years: Team
- 2012–2015: Saint Kitts and Nevis

Jeffrey "Pedro" Hazel (born 20 September 1979) is a Saint Kitts and Nevis professional football manager.

Since August 2012 until April 2015 he was the coach of the Saint Kitts and Nevis national football team.
