= Cuba national football team =

Men's association football team

Cuba
- Nickname(s): Los Leones del Caribe (The Lions of the Caribbean); Los Diablos Rojos (The Red Devils)
- Association: Asociación de Fútbol de Cuba (AFC)
- Confederation: CONCACAF (North America)
- Sub-confederation: CFU (Caribbean)
- Head coach: Pedro Pablo Pereira
- Captain: Karel Espino
- Most caps: Yénier Márquez (126)
- Top scorer: Lester Moré (30)
- Home stadium: Estadio Pedro Marrero; Estadio La Polar
- FIFA code: CUB
First colours	Second colours

FIFA ranking
- Current: 162 ▲1 (18 November 2026)
- Highest: 46 (November – December 2006)
- Lowest: 182 (August 2017, March–May 2018)

First international
- Cuba 3–1 Jamaica (Havana, Cuba; 16 March 1930)

Biggest win
- Cuba 11–0 Turks and Caicos Islands (Havana, Cuba; 8 September 2018)

Biggest defeat
- Sweden 8–0 Cuba (Antibes, France; 12 June 1938); Soviet Union 8–0 Cuba (Moscow, Soviet Union; 24 July 1980); Russia 8–0 Cuba (Volgograd, Russia; 20 November 2023)

World Cup
- Appearances: 1 (first in 1938)
- Best result: Quarter-finals (1938)

CONCACAF Championship / Gold Cup
- Appearances: 13 (first in 1971)
- Best result: Fourth place (1971)

Olympic Games
- Appearances: 2 (first in 1976)
- Best result: Quarter-finals (1980)
Medal record
NAFC Championship
Silver medal – second place	1947 Cuba	Team
Bronze medal – third place	1949 Mexico	Team
CFU Caribbean Cup
Gold medal – first place	2012 Antigua and Barbuda	Team
Silver medal – second place	1996 Trinidad and Tobago	Team
Silver medal – second place	1999 Trinidad and Tobago	Team
Silver medal – second place	2005 Barbados	Team
Bronze medal – third place	1995 Cayman Islands and Jamaica	Team
Bronze medal – third place	2007 Trinidad and Tobago	Team
Bronze medal – third place	2010 Martinique	Team
Central American and Caribbean Games
Gold medal – first place	1930 Havana	Team

The Cuba national football team (Spanish: Selección de fútbol de Cuba) represents Cuba in men's international football, and is governed by the Football Association of Cuba (Spanish: Asociación de Fútbol de Cuba), the governing body for football in Cuba founded in 1924. It has been a full member of FIFA since 1932, is a founding member of CONCACAF which was founded in 1961, and is also a member of CFU in the Caribbean Zone. The team was a member of NAFC (1946–1955) and a member of CCCF (1955–1961), the two predecessor confederations of CONCACAF. Cuba was also a member of PFC, the former unified confederation of the Americas.

Cuba has participated once in the FIFA World Cup in 1938, becoming the first Caribbean team to play in the competition. It is one of five CONCACAF teams to advance to the knockout stage, reaching the quarter-finals. In the round of 16, Cuba defeated Romania 2–1 in a replay, after drawing 3–3 in the first match. However, Cuba was eliminated in the quarter-finals by Sweden. The team qualified twice for the Olympic Games (1976 and 1980), reaching the quarter-finals in 1980.

Cuba has participated twelve times in CONCACAF's premier continental competition, finishing as fourth place in the 1971 CONCACAF Championship. The team's best performance under the CONCACAF Gold Cup format was reaching the quarter-finals three times (2003, 2013 and 2015). It has participated three times in League A and twice in League B of the CONCACAF Nations League.

In subcontinental competitions, the team finished as runners-up in the 1947 NAFC Championship, it also won the 2012 Caribbean Cup and the gold medal at the 1930 Central American and Caribbean Games.

== History ==
=== Early history ===
Cuba played its first international football match on 16 March 1930 at that year's Central American and Caribbean Games. They beat Jamaica (then a British colony) 3–1 in Havana. Four days later, they beat Honduras 7–0. Cuba were managed by José Tapia, who remained in charge until after Cuba's 1938 World Cup campaign.

Cuba's first World Cup qualification campaign was for the 1934 World Cup in Italy. All of the CONCACAF entrants were placed in Group 11. The winner of a best-of-three tournament between the two weakest nations, Cuba and Haiti would produce a winner to play 1930 qualifiers Mexico in another round of best-of-three. The winner of that would play 1930 semi-finalists the United States of America for a place in the finals. All of the matches between Cuba and Haiti in the first round were staged at Parc Leconte in Port-au-Prince, Haiti, on 28, 1 and 4 January–February 1934. Cuba won the first match 3–1 with Mario Lopez opening from a penalty and Hector Socorro scoring the second. The second match was a 1–1 draw with Lopez equalising in the 85th minute. In the final match, Cuba won 6–0 with two Lopez goals, one from Hector Socorro and one from his brother Francisco.

The second round against Mexico consisted of three matches at Parque Necaxa in Mexico City. Its first match, on 4 March 1934, saw Mexico go 3–0 up with a hat-trick by Dionisio Mejia, his goals scored in the 12th, 14th and 16th minutes. Mario Lopez scored twice for Cuba with one in each half, but Mexico won 3–2. A week later, Mejia scored another hat-trick as Mexico won 5–0, and seven days later, Mexico won 4–1 after Lopez opened the scoring in the 15th minute. Mexico did not qualify, their 4–2 play-off defeat to the United States was held in Rome during the finals, as the two teams had forgotten to stage it earlier.

=== 1938–2000 ===
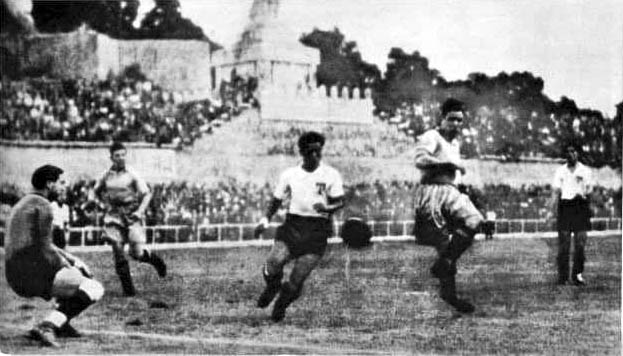
Cuba v Sweden at the 1938 World Cup

The decision to stage the 1938 World Cup in France was poorly received in the Americas, who had hoped for it to return to South America after the 1934 World Cup in Italy. All nations in South America except Brazil withdrew, and all CONCACAF nations except Cuba, thus the two qualified by default.

The tournament was held as a straight knock-out tournament of 16 nations. Cuba were drawn to play their first-ever World Cup finals match against Romania (who were making their third finals appearance) at Stade du T.O.E.C. in Toulouse, on 5 June 1938. Silviu Bindea put Romania ahead after 35 minutes and Hector Socorro equalised nine minutes later. With three minutes remaining, Tomás Fernández gave Cuba the lead, but within a minute Iuliu Baratky forced extra time with a Romanian equaliser. Romania went 3–2 up in extra-time by Ștefan Dobay's goal on 105 minutes, but Juan Tuñas equalised for Cuba with three minutes of extra-time remaining.

The replay was held at the same stadium, on 9 June. This was at the same time as Switzerland's 4–2 replay win over Germany. Dobay put Romania 1–0 up at half-time with a 35th-minute goal, but in the second half Cuba equalised through Socorro in the 51st minute. Six minutes later, Carlos Oliviera scored the winning goal and it ended 2–1. In the quarter-final, Cuba lost 8–0 to Sweden at Stade du Fort Carre in Antibes, on 12 June. Sweden's Tore Keller and Gustav Wetterström each scored hat-tricks.

The NAFC Championship 1949 served as CONCACAF's qualification group for the 1950 World Cup in Brazil. Cuba, the United States of America and Mexico played each other twice in a tournament held in Mexico City in September 1949. The top two would qualify. Cuba came third and did not qualify, their only point was gained from their second match, a 1–1 draw against the United States on 14 September. Cuba did not compete in World Cup qualification again until 1966, already under Castro's regime. They returned to participation in qualification for 1978, but the 1982 qualifiers represented a significant breakthrough- Cuba reached the final round of qualifying, and were only two points short of reaching the 1982 World Cup. In recent years, Cuban football has seen an improvement in results.

=== 2000–present ===
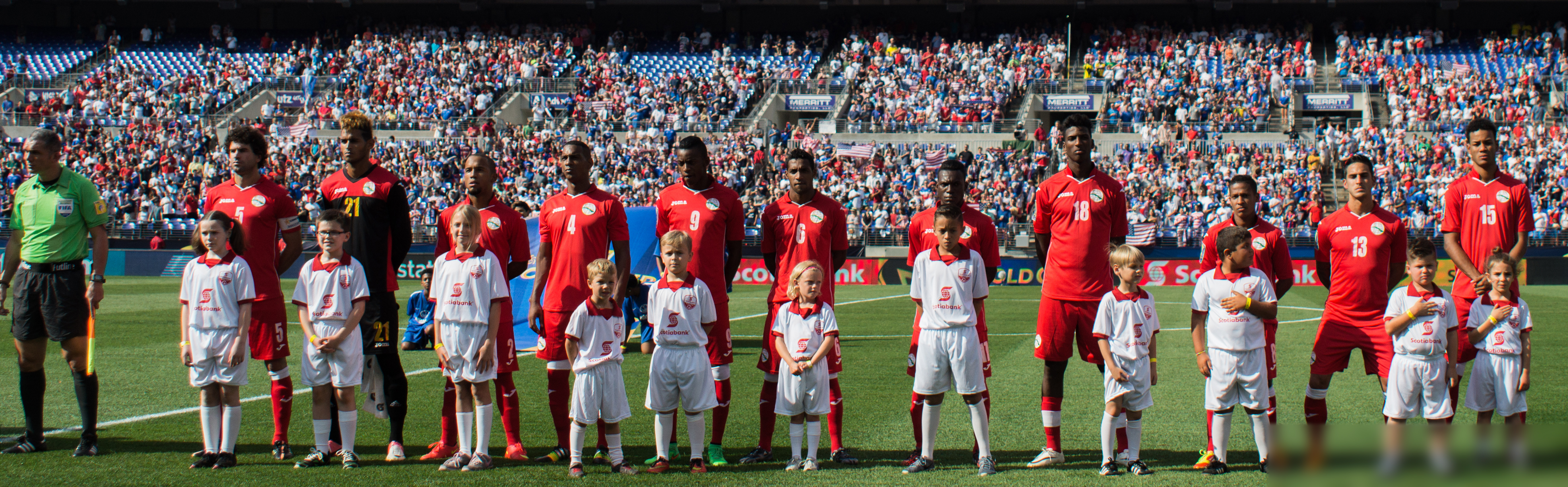
The national football team of Cuba in 2015

They reached the quarter-finals of the 2003 Gold Cup (where they were beaten by the United States) by defeating Canada 2–0 in the Group stage. During the 2006 World Cup qualifiers, Cuba faced Costa Rica and were only eliminated on away goals. They held Costa Rica to a draw in Havana 2–2 and later battled it out for a 1–1 draw in Costa Rica.

During the 2010 World Cup qualifiers, Cuba faced Antigua and Barbuda and the match ended in a 3–3 draw. Later in Pedro Marreo, Cuba won 4–1 to advance to the semi-final round of the CONCACAF World Cup qualifiers. Cuba was with the United States, Trinidad and Tobago and Guatemala. Cuba finished in the fourth place with only one victory against Guatemala 2–1 with a goal scored by Aliannis Urgellés.

They finished in third place in the 2010 Caribbean Cup to take a place in the 2011 Gold Cup. In 2012, Cuba won the Caribbean Cup for the first time.

For the 2014 World Cup, the Cuban team qualified directly to the Third round as one of the six highest ranked teams and were placed in Group C with Honduras, Panama, and Canada. Although the Cuban team had several close games, they ended their qualification process with one draw and five defeats (losing home and away to Canada and Honduras and drawing to Panama in Havana in their final game after losing in Panama City). Their only goal of the qualifying campaign came from Alberto Gomes against Panama in the final game of the group stage.

== Defection and economic migration by Cuban athletes ==
As well as Cuban athletes in other sports, a number of football players have made the move to the United States in recent years. During the 2002 Gold Cup in Los Angeles, two Cuban players Rey Ángel Martínez and Alberto Delgado chose to remain in the United States. Striker Maykel Galindo did so during the 2005 Gold Cup. Two more, Osvaldo Alonso and Lester More did so during the 2007 Gold Cup.

In 2008, defections occurred during two separate tournaments held in the United States. In March, seven players from the U-23 national football, including Yeniel Bermúdez, Yordany Álvarez and Yendry Díaz defected during the 2008 CONCACAF Olympic Qualifying tournament while the team was based in Tampa, FL. In October, two days before the country's World Cup Qualifier versus the US, Reynier Alcántara and Pedro Faife walked away from the team's hotel near Washington, D.C.

During the 2011 CONCACAF Gold Cup, Yosniel Mesa defected while the team was in Charlotte, North Carolina. During the 2015 Gold Cup, forward Keiler García defected to the United States before the team's first match against Mexico in Chicago. In September 2019, five players (Yordan Santa Cruz, Andy Baquero, David Urgelles, Orlendis Benítez and Alejandro Portal) defected to Canada during the 2019–20 CONCACAF Nations League before and after a match against Canada.

During the 2023 CONCACAF Gold Cup, four players (Roberney Caballero, Denilson Milanés, Neisser Sandó and Jassael Herrera) defected while the team was preparing to travel from Miami to Houston for their last two group stage matches. Another player, Sandy Sánchez, also defected after the last group stage game against Canada, with a member of the medical staff reportedly following suit.

== Team image ==
The logo used by the team from 2019 to 2023.

=== Kit sponsorship ===
Kit supplier	Period
(Germany) Adidas	1981–1983
None	1984–1987
(Germany) Adidas	1988–2012
Forward	2013
(Spain) Joma	2015–present

== Results and fixtures ==
The following is a list of match results in the last 12 months, as well as any future matches that have been scheduled.

Win Draw Loss Fixture

=== 2026 ===
26 March 2025–26 CONCACAF Series	Martinique	2–2	Cuba	Santiago, Dominican Republic
17:00 UTC−4	Appin 26'; Antiste 42'	Report	Paradela 22'; Espino 50'	Stadium: Estadio Cibao; Referee: David Gómez (Costa Rica)

29 March 2025–26 CONCACAF Series	Dominican Republic	1–1	Cuba	Santiago, Dominican Republic
18:00 UTC−4	Romero 53'	Report	D. Reyes 51'	Stadium: Estadio Cibao FC; Referee: Roger Mélendez (Nicaragua)

25 September 2026–27 Nations League	Grenada	0–3	Cuba	Basseterre, Saint Kitts and Nevis
17:00 UTC−4		Report	Sandiford 19' (o.g.); Díaz 90+1'; Reinoso 90+4'	Stadium: SKNFA Technical Center; Attendance: 328; Referee: Patrick Sénécharles (Haiti)

28 September 2026–27 Nations League	Cuba	2–0	Bonaire	Basseterre, Saint Kitts and Nevis
17:00 UTC−4	Matos 3'; Catasus 49'	Report		Stadium: SKNFA Technical Center; Attendance: 139; Referee: Christopher Mason (Jamaica)

2 October 2026–27 Nations League	Saint Kitts and Nevis	3–3	Cuba	Port of Spain, Trinidad and Tobago
17:00 UTC−4	Kelly 26'; Simpson 82'; Williams 88'	Report	Y. Pérez 29', 51'; Catasus 38'	Stadium: Hasely Crawford Stadium; Attendance: 75; Referee: Guido Gonzales Jr. (United States)

5 October 2026–27 Nations League	Cuba	2–2	Saint Kitts and Nevis	Port of Spain, Trinidad and Tobago
17:00 UTC−4	Y. Pérez 25'; Díaz 90'	Report	Williams 16', 63' (pen.)	Stadium: Hasely Crawford Stadium; Attendance: 79; Referee: Randy Encarnación (Dominican Republic)

12 November 2026–27 Nations League	Bonaire	1–7	Cuba	Havana, Cuba
15:00 UTC−4	Bostdorp 58'	Report	Camejo 7'; Aguirre 51'; Y. Pérez 56'; Díaz 69', 77'; Paradela 74'; Reinoso 79'	Stadium: Estadio La Polar; Referee: Jefferson Escobar (Honduras)

16 November 2026–27 Nations League	Cuba	9–0	Grenada	Havana, Cuba
15:00 UTC−4	Nebreda 5'; Aguirre 19', 40'; Bravo 42'; Camejo 49'; Reyes 55'; Campos 67'; K. Pérez 81'; Díaz 88'	Report		Stadium: Estadio La Polar; Referee: Jorge Leira (Panama)

== Coaching history ==
- (Cuba) José Tapia (1930–1934)
- (United States) Gavin Newton (1934–1935)
- (Cuba) José Tapia (1935–1938)
- (Cuba) Marcelino Minsal (1947–1949)
- (Czechoslovakia) František Churda (1963–1964)
- (Hungary) Karoly Kósa (1966)
- (Hungary) László Mohácsi (1967)
- (North Korea) Kim Yong-ha (1970–1971)
- (Cuba) Sergio Padrón (1971–1977)
- (Hungary) Tibor Ivanics (1980–1981)
- (Cuba) Roberto Hernández (1985–1988)
- (Italy) Giovanni Campari (1990–1996)
- (Cuba) William Bennett (1996–2000)
- (Peru) Miguel Company (2000–2004)
- (Cuba) Luis Armelio Garcia (2004–2005)
- (Cuba) Raúl González (2006–2007)
- (Germany) Reinhold Fanz (2008)
- (Cuba) Raúl González (2008–2012)
- (Cuba) Chandler González (2012)
- (Cuba) Walter Benítez (2012–2015)
- (Cuba) Raúl González (2015–2016)
- (Cuba) Julio Valero (2016)
- (Cuba) Raúl Mederos (2016–2019)
- (Cuba) Pablo Elier Sánchez (2019–2023)
- (Cuba) Yunielys Castillo (2023–2025)
- (Cuba) Pedro Pablo Pereira (2025–present)

== Players ==
=== Current squad ===
The following players were called up for the 2025–26 CONCACAF Series matches against Martinique and Dominican Republic on 26 and 29 March 2026.
Caps and goals correct as of 30 March 2026, after the match against Dominican Republic.

No.	Pos.	Player	Date of birth (age)	Caps	Goals	Club
	GK	Ismel Morgado	31 May 2003 (age 23)	6	0	(Nicaraguan Football Federation) ART Municipal Jalapa
	GK	Yurdy Hodelin	23 September 2005 (age 21)	2	0	(Costa Rican Football Federation) Consultants
	GK	Yorlan Urgelles	23 February 2005 (age 21)	0	0	(Football Association of Cuba) FC Guantánamo
	DF	Yosel Piedra	27 March 1994 (age 32)	42	2	(Costa Rican Football Federation) AD San Carlos
	DF	Karel Espino	27 October 2001 (age 25)	32	2	(National Football Federation of Guatemala) Comunicaciones
	DF	Karel Pérez	25 August 2005 (age 21)	14	0	(Costa Rican Football Federation) Sarchi
	DF	Orlando Calvo	9 April 1999 (age 27)	13	0	(Costa Rican Football Federation) Escorpiones
	DF	Elvis Casanova	17 September 2005 (age 21)	7	0	(Costa Rican Football Federation) Consultants
	DF	Leandro Mena	3 February 2005 (age 21)	4	0	(Costa Rican Football Federation) Escorpiones
	DF	Camilo Pinillo	16 May 2007 (age 19)	1	0	(Football Association of Finland) VPS
	DF	Dayron David Reyes	7 October 2004 (age 22)	1	0	(Football Association of Cuba) La Habana
	MF	Yunior Pérez	12 March 2001 (age 25)	29	0	(National Football Federation of Guatemala) Municipal
	MF	Dairon Reyes	18 September 2003 (age 23)	21	2	(National Football Federation of Guatemala) Comunicaciones
	MF	Romario Torres	9 February 2005 (age 21)	14	1	(Costa Rican Football Federation) Jicaral
	MF	Diego Catasus	3 April 2005 (age 21)	9	0	(Italian Football Federation) Vibonese
	MF	Pedro Bravo	5 December 2001 (age 24)	7	1	(Costa Rican Football Federation) Consultants
	MF	Michael Camejo	17 March 2005 (age 21)	6	0	(Costa Rican Football Federation) Escorpiones
	MF	Marcos Campos	15 November 2005 (age 21)	4	0	(Nicaraguan Football Federation) Sébaco
	MF	Eloy Nebreda	9 July 2007 (age 19)	2	0	(Royal Spanish Football Federation) Real Sociedad C
	MF	Maikol Vega	12 September 2006 (age 20)	0	0	(Costa Rican Football Federation) Inter de San Carlos
	FW	Luis Paradela	21 January 1997 (age 29)	36	11	(Costa Rican Football Federation) Saprissa
	FW	Yasniel Matos	29 March 2002 (age 24)	34	3	(National Football Federation of Guatemala) Municipal
	FW	Alessio Raballo	9 September 2006 (age 20)	6	0	(Italian Football Federation) Torino Youth Sector
	FW	Jorge Aguirre	5 January 2000 (age 26)	4	1	(Portuguese Football Federation) Torreense
	FW	Jade Quiñónes	23 September 2007 (age 19)	0	0	(Portuguese Football Federation) Torreense U23

=== Recent call-ups ===
The following players have also been called up to the Cuba squad within the last twelve months.

Pos.	Player	Date of birth (age)	Caps	Goals	Club	Latest call-up
FW	Maikel Reyes	4 March 1993 (age 33)	49	13	(Nicaragua) Managua	v. Martinique, 15 November 2025
^{INJ} Player withdrew from the squad due to an injury.^{PRE} Preliminary squad.^{RET} Player retired from the national team.^{SUS} Player is serving suspension.^{WD} Player withdrew from the squad due to non-injury issue.

== Player records ==
As of 10 June 2026
Players in bold are still active with Cuba.

=== Most appearances ===
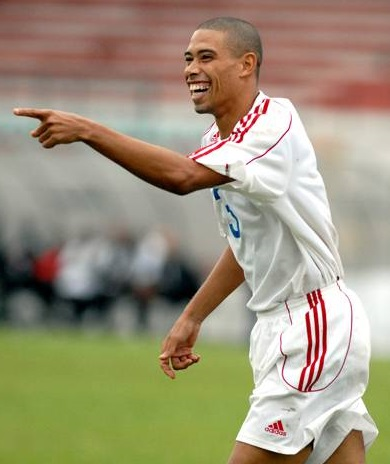
Yénier Márquez is Cuba's most capped player, with 126 appearances.

Rank	Player	Caps	Goals	Years
1	Yénier Márquez	126	16	2000–2015
2	Odelín Molina	123	0	1996–2013
3	Jaime Colomé	82	12	2002–2013
4	Alexánder Cruzata	74	2	1996–2005
5	Lázaro Darcourt	73	21	1995–2003
6	Alain Cervantes	68	8	2003–2016
7	Silvio Pedro Miñoso	66	0	2002–2008
8	Reysander Fernández	65	3	2003–2012
9	Lester Moré	60	30	1996–2007
10	Manuel Bobadilla	57	11	1995–2001

=== Top goalscorers ===
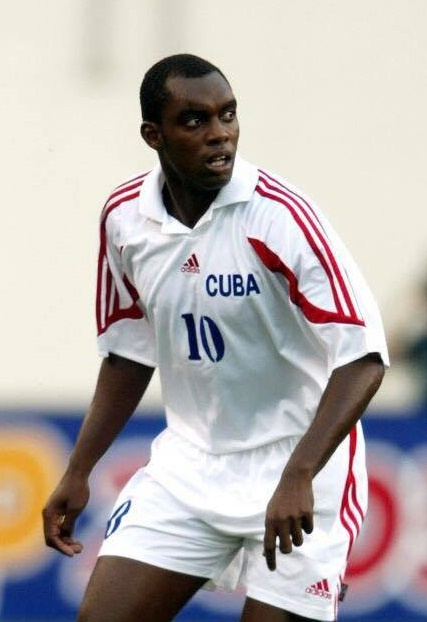
Lester Moré is Cuba's all-time top scorer, with 30 goals.

Rank	Player	Goals	Caps	Ratio	Career
1	Lester Moré	30	60	0.5	1996–2007
2	Lázaro Darcourt	21	73	0.29	1995–2003
3	Roberto Linares	16	42	0.38	2008–2012
3	Yénier Márquez	16	126	0.12	2000–2015
5	Eduardo Sebrango	13	23	0.57	1996–1998
5	**Maikel Reyes**	13	49	0.24	2012–present
7	Serguei Prado	12	30	0.4	1999–2005
7	Maykel Galindo	12	33	0.36	2002–2005
7	Osmín Hernández	12	46	0.26	1995–2004
7	Jaime Colomé	12	82	0.15	2002–2013

== Competitive record ==
=== FIFA World Cup ===
FIFA World Cup record										Qualification record						
Year	Result	Position	Pld	W	D	L	GF	GA	Squad	Outcome	Pld	W	D	L	GF	GA
(Uruguay) 1930	Not a FIFA member									Not a FIFA member						
(Italy) 1934	Did not qualify									2nd	6	2	1	3	13	14
(France) 1938	Quarter-finals	7th	3	1	1	1	5	12	Squad	Qualified by default						
(Brazil) 1950	Did not qualify									3rd	4	0	1	3	3	11
(Switzerland) 1954	Not accepted									Not accepted						
(Sweden) 1958	Did not enter									Did not enter						
(Chile) 1962	Did not enter									Did not enter						
(England) 1966	Did not qualify									3rd	4	1	1	2	3	5
(Mexico) 1970	Not accepted									Not accepted						
(West Germany) 1974	Did not enter									Did not enter						
(Argentina) 1978	Did not qualify									Playoff	5	2	2	1	7	5
(Spain) 1982	Did not qualify									5th	9	4	3	2	11	8
(Mexico) 1986	Did not enter									Did not enter						
(Italy) 1990	Did not qualify									2nd	2	0	1	1	1	2
(United States) 1994	Withdrew									Withdrew						
(France) 1998	Did not qualify									4th	10	4	1	5	17	18
(South Korea) (Japan) 2002	Did not qualify									Playoff	8	2	5	1	7	3
(Germany) 2006	Did not qualify									Playoff	4	2	2	0	8	4
(South Africa) 2010	Did not qualify									4th	8	3	0	5	13	21
(Brazil) 2014	Did not qualify									4th	6	0	1	5	1	10
(Russia) 2018	Did not qualify									Playoff	2	0	2	0	1	1
(Qatar) 2022	Did not qualify									3rd	4	2	0	2	7	3
(Canada) (Mexico) (United States) 2026	Did not qualify									3rd	4	2	0	2	6	5
(Morocco) (Portugal) (Spain) 2030	To be determined									To be determined						
(Saudi Arabia) 2034	To be determined									To be determined						
Total	Quarter-finals	1/22	3	1	1	1	5	12	—	—	76	24	20	32	98	110

FIFA World Cup history
First match	Cuba 3–3 Romania (5 June 1938; Toulouse, France)
Biggest win	Cuba 2–1 Romania (9 June 1938; Toulouse, France)
Biggest defeat	Cuba 0–8 Sweden (12 June 1938; Antibes, France)
Best result	Seventh place (1938)
Worst result	—

=== CONCACAF Gold Cup ===
CONCACAF Championship & Gold Cup record
Year	Result	Position	Pld	W	D	L	GF	GA	Squad
(El Salvador) 1963	Did not enter								
(Guatemala) 1965	Withdrew								
(Honduras) 1967	Did not qualify								
(Costa Rica) 1969	Did not enter								
(Trinidad and Tobago) 1971	Fourth place	4th	5	1	2	2	5	7	Squad
(Haiti) 1973	Did not enter								
(Mexico) 1977	Did not qualify								
(Honduras) 1981	Final round	5th	5	1	2	2	4	8	Squad
1985	Did not enter								
1989	Did not qualify								
(United States) 1991	Withdrew								
(Mexico) (United States) 1993	Did not enter								
(United States) 1996	Did not qualify								
(United States) 1998	Group stage	10th	2	0	0	2	2	10	Squad
(United States) 2000	Did not qualify								
(United States) 2002	Group stage	11th	2	0	1	1	0	1	Squad
(Mexico) (United States) 2003	Quarter-finals	8th	3	1	0	2	2	8	Squad
(United States) 2005	Group stage	12th	3	0	0	3	3	9	Squad
(United States) 2007	Group stage	12th	3	0	1	2	3	9	Squad
(United States) 2009	Withdrew								
(United States) 2011	Group stage	12th	3	0	0	3	1	16	Squad
(United States) 2013	Quarter-finals	8th	4	1	0	3	6	13	Squad
(Canada) (United States) 2015	Quarter-finals	8th	4	1	0	3	1	14	Squad
(United States) 2017	Did not qualify								
(Costa Rica) (Jamaica) (United States) 2019	Group stage	16th	3	0	0	3	0	17	Squad
(United States) 2021	Withdrew								
(Canada) (United States) 2023	Group stage	15th	3	0	0	3	3	9	Squad
(Canada) (United States) 2025	Did not qualify								
2027	Qualified								
Total	Fourth place	13/29	40	5	6	29	30	121	—

=== CONCACAF Nations League ===
CONCACAF Nations League record
League										Finals								
Season	Division	Group	Pld	W	D	L	GF	GA	P/R	Year	Result	Pld	W	D	L	GF	GA	Squad
2019–20	A	A	4	0	0	4	0	18	▼	(United States) 2021	Did not qualify							
2022–23	B	A	6	5	0	1	11	3	▲	(United States) 2023	Ineligible							
2023–24	A	B	4	1	2	1	1	4	Same position	(United States) 2024	Did not qualify							
2024–25	A	B	4	0	3	1	4	6	▼	(United States) 2025	Did not qualify							
2026–27	B	C	In progress							(United States) 2027	Ineligible							
Total	—	—	18	6	5	7	16	31	—	Total	0 Titles	—	—	—	—	—	—	—

=== CFU Caribbean Cup ===
CFU Championship & Caribbean Cup record									Qualification record					
Year	Result	Pld	W	D	L	GF	GA	Squad	Pld	W	D	L	GF	GA
(Trinidad and Tobago) 1978	Did not enter								Did not enter					
(Suriname) 1979	Did not enter								Did not enter					
(Puerto Rico) 1981	Did not enter								Did not enter					
(French Guiana) 1983	Did not enter								Did not enter					
(Barbados) 1985	Did not enter								Did not enter					
(Martinique) 1988	Did not enter								Did not enter					
(Barbados) 1989	Did not enter								Did not enter					
(Trinidad and Tobago) 1990	Did not enter								Did not enter					
(Jamaica) 1991	Withdrew								Withdrew					
(Trinidad and Tobago) 1992	Fourth place	5	2	2	1	4	2	Squad	2	2	0	0	8	0
(Jamaica) 1993	Did not enter								Did not enter					
(Trinidad and Tobago) 1994	Withdrew								Withdrew					
(Cayman Islands) (Jamaica) 1995	Third place	5	3	0	2	9	6	Squad	3	3	0	0	15	0
(Trinidad and Tobago) 1996	Runners-up	5	3	1	1	7	2	Squad	1	1	0	0	4	0
(Antigua and Barbuda) (Saint Kitts and Nevis) 1997	Did not enter								Did not enter					
(Trinidad and Tobago) (Jamaica) 1998	Did not qualify								2	1	1	0	4	3
(Trinidad and Tobago) 1999	Runners-up	4	3	0	1	8	3	Squad	3	3	0	0	13	2
(Trinidad and Tobago) 2001	Fourth place	5	1	2	2	5	7	Squad	3	3	0	0	7	1
(Barbados) 2005	Runners-up	3	2	0	1	5	2	Squad	4	3	1	0	6	1
(Trinidad and Tobago) 2007	Third place	5	2	1	2	7	6	Squad	6	5	1	0	24	2
(Jamaica) 2008	Fourth place	5	2	2	1	7	4	Squad	3	2	1	0	14	2
(Martinique) 2010	Third place	5	3	1	1	5	4	Squad	3	1	2	0	7	5
(Antigua and Barbuda) 2012	Champions	5	4	0	1	5	2	Squad	3	1	1	1	6	2
(Jamaica) 2014	Fourth place	4	1	2	1	5	5	Squad	Qualified as defending champions					
(Martinique) 2017	Did not qualify								2	1	0	1	2	4
Total	1 Title	51	26	11	14	67	43	—	31	28	8	2	105	21

=== Olympic Games ===
Olympic Games record
Year	Result	Position	Pld	W	D	L	GF	GA	Squad
(Canada) 1976	Group stage	11th	2	0	1	1	0	1	Squad
(Soviet Union) 1980	Quarter-finals	7th	4	2	0	2	3	12	Squad
Total			6	2	1	3	3	13	—

=== NAFC Championship ===
NAFC Championship record
Year	Result	Pld	W	D	L	GF	GA
(Cuba) 1947	Runners-up	2	1	0	1	6	5
(Mexico) 1949	Third place	4	0	1	3	3	11
Total	Runners-up	6	1	1	4	9	16

=== CCCF Championship ===
CCCF Championship record
Year	Result	Pld	W	D*	L	GF	GA
(Costa Rica) 1941	Not a CCCF member						
(El Salvador) 1943	Not a CCCF member						
(Costa Rica) 1946	Not a CCCF member						
(Guatemala) 1948	Not a CCCF member						
(Panama) 1951	Not a CCCF member						
(Costa Rica) 1953	Not a CCCF member						
(Honduras) 1955	Seventh place	6	1	0	5	3	17
(Netherlands Antilles) 1957	Fifth place	4	0	0	4	1	11
(Cuba) 1960	Fifth place	4	1	0	3	5	12
(Costa Rica) 1961	Fifth place	4	0	0	4	2	9
Total	Fifth place	18	2	0	16	11	49

== Honours ==
=== Subcontinental / Regional ===
- NAFC Championship (Note: Competition organized by NAFC, the former subcontinental confederation affiliated with FIFA as the governing body for football in North America (1946–1961), and a direct predecessor of CONCACAF.)
  - (silver) Runners-up (1): 1947
  - (bronze) Third place (1): 1949
- Caribbean Cup
  - (gold) Champions (1): 2012
  - (silver) Runners-up (3): 1996, 1999, 2005
  - (bronze) Third place (3): 1995, 2007, 2010
- Central American and Caribbean Games
  - (gold) Gold medal (1): 1930

=== Summary ===
Honours in competitions directly organized or recognized by FIFA or an affiliated confederation.

Competition	1st place, gold medalist(s)	2nd place, silver medalist(s)	3rd place, bronze medalist(s)	Total
NAFC Championship	0	1	1	2
Total	0	1	1	2

== See also ==
- Football in Cuba
- Football Association of Cuba
- Cuba national under-20 football team
- Cuba national under-17 football team
- Cuba national under-15 football team
- Liga Nacional de Cuba
