= Curtez Kellman =

Guyanese professional footballer

Personal information
- Full name: Curtez Dominic Kellman
- Date of birth: 6 March 1998 (age 28)
- Place of birth: Georgetown, Guyana
- Height: 1.82 m (6 ft 0 in)
- Positions: Defender; midfielder

College career
Years	Team	Apps	(Gls)
2019–2020	Eastern Florida State Titans	19	(1)
2021	Daytona State Falcons	25	(4)

Senior career*
Years	Team	Apps	(Gls)
2015–2016	Georgetown FC		
2016–2017	Grenades FC		
2017–2018	Georgetown FC		
2018	Western Tigers		
2022	Sporting Kansas City II	19	(0)

International career^{‡}
2017–	Guyana	32	(1)
- * Club domestic league appearances and goals as of 5 January 2023 ‡ National team caps and goals as of 24 November 2023

Curtez Dominic Kellman (born 6 March 1998) is a Guyanese professional footballer who plays as a defender and midfielder for the Guyana national team.

== Club career ==
Kellman began his career at Georgetown FC in the 2015–16 season. He went on to play for Grenades FC in Antigua and Barbuda before returning to Georgetown FC in 2017. Kellman later signed for Western Tigers.

== College career ==
Kellman began his college soccer career at Eastern Florida State College, where he earned a two-year scholarship following a successful try-out.

In the 2019 season, Kellman played in 19 matches for Eastern Florida. He scored one goal on the season, in a 4–0 win over Laramie County Community College. However, due to the financial impact of the COVID-19 pandemic, Kellman lost his scholarship at Eastern Florida. He was subsequently offered a scholarship by Daytona State College.

On 15 January 2021, he officially secured a scholarship to play at Daytona State. The 2020 season was postponed to the spring of 2021 due to the pandemic, and Kellman made his debut for Daytona State on 2 April 2021 in a 0–0 draw against Georgia Military College. His first goal came on 22 May in a 7–0 win vs. University of South Carolina Lancaster. He went on to make 11 appearances in his first season with Daytona State.

== Professional career ==
Kellman was one of 17 trialists who joined MLS Next Pro side Sporting Kansas City II during the preseason in 2022.

He was then signed by SKC II ahead of the 2022 season.

== International career ==
Kellman made his international debut for Guyana on 25 November 2017 in a friendly against Indonesia, coming on as an early sub in the 16th minute.
