= Thomas Grosser =

German footballer

Personal information
- Date of birth: 10 April 1965
- Place of birth: Munich, West Germany
- Date of death: 12 February 2008 (aged 42)
- Place of death: Unterhaching, Germany
- Height: 1.79 m (5 ft 10 1/2 in)
- Position: Midfielder

Youth career
- TSV Forstenried
- FC Bayern Munich
- 1983–1989: SpVgg Unterhaching

Senior career*
Years	Team	Apps	(Gls)
1989–1990	SpVgg Unterhaching	26	(1)
- * Club domestic league appearances and goals

Thomas Grosser (10 April 1965 – 12 February 2008 in Unterhaching) was a German football player.

Grosser came to SpVgg Unterhaching in 1983; before he played in the youth department of FC Bayern Munich and TSV Forstenried. In 1989, he became a midfield player with Unterhaching from Bavaria League in the 2. Bundesliga and completed the season 1989–90 (26 games) with one goal for his club. After his active career, he worked for ten years as coach of the seniors B, and was also a committed youth coach.

Grosser died during an indoor training. He suddenly collapsed and could not be revived. Grosser was the son of Peter Grosser, a former player at TSV 1860 München.
