= Jorge Aguirre (footballer, born 2000) =

Spanish footballer (born 2000)

Personal information
- Full name: Jorge Aguirre de Céspedes
- Date of birth: 5 January 2000 (age 26)
- Place of birth: Lesaka, Spain
- Height: 1.83 m (6 ft 0 in)
- Position: Forward

Team information
- Current team: Torreense
- Number: 9

Youth career
- Beti Gazte
- 2016–2018: Real Sociedad

Senior career*
Years	Team	Apps	(Gls)
2018–2022	Real Sociedad C	45	(10)
2020–2023	Real Sociedad B	52	(6)
2022	→ Mirandés (loan)	8	(0)
2023–2024	Osasuna B	37	(5)
2024–2026	Gil Vicente	31	(3)
2025–2026	→ Panetolikos (loan)	24	(4)
2026–	Torreense	0	(0)

International career^{‡}
2025–	Cuba	2	(1)
- * Club domestic league appearances and goals as of 14 June 2026 ‡ National team caps and goals as of 10 June 2025

Jorge Aguirre de Céspedes (born 5 January 2000) is a professional footballer who plays as a forward for Liga Portugal 2 club Torreense. Born in Spain, he plays for the Cuba national team.

== Club career ==
Born in Lesaka, Navarre to a Cuban mother, Aguirre joined Real Sociedad's youth setup in 2016, from Beti Gazte KJKE. He made his senior debut with the C-team on 25 August 2018, starting in a 2–0 Tercera División away win over SD San Pedro.

Aguirre scored his first senior goal on 2 September 2018, netting the C's fifth in a 6–0 home routing of Zamudio SD. He first appeared with the reserves on 1 November 2020; after coming on as a late substitute for Daniel Garrido, he scored the side's third in a 3–0 home win over CD Laredo, after just 46 seconds on the field.

Aguirre made his professional debut with the B-side on 31 December 2021, replacing Luca Sangalli late into a 2–3 loss at SD Eibar in the Segunda División championship. The following 20 January, he moved on loan to fellow second division side CD Mirandés for the remainder of the season.

On 19 June 2023, Aguirre signed a one-year deal with another reserve team, CA Osasuna B in Primera Federación.

On 3 July 2024, Aguirre signed a three-year deal with Portuguese Primeira Liga club Gil Vicente. After one season with the Barcelos-based side, he was sent on a season-long loan to Super League Greece club Panetolikos.

In July 2026, Aguirre joined Liga Portugal 2 club Torreense.

== International goals ==
No.	Date	Venue	Opponent	Score	Result	Competition
1.	10 June 2025	Estadio Antonio Maceo, Santiago de Cuba, Cuba	Bermuda	1–1	1–2	2026 FIFA World Cup qualification
