= Dairon Reyes =

Cuban footballer (born 2003)

Personal information
- Full name: Dairon Reyes Rueda
- Date of birth: 18 September 2003 (age 23)
- Place of birth: Havana, Cuba
- Height: 1.73 m (5 ft 8 in)
- Position: Forward

Team information
- Current team: Comunicaciones
- Number: 20

Youth career
- 2019–2021: Inter Miami

Senior career*
Years	Team	Apps	(Gls)
2020–2025	Inter Miami CF II	51	(5)
2025–	Comunicaciones	28	(10)

International career^{‡}
2021–	Cuba	20	(3)
- * Club domestic league appearances and goals as of 20 April 2026 (UTC) ‡ National team caps and goals as of 21:00, 28 March 2026 (UTC)

Dairon Reyes Rueda (born 18 September 2003) is a Cuban professional footballer who plays as a forward for Liga Bantrab club Comunicaciones and the Cuba national team.

== Youth career ==
When Reyes was 16, he moved to Miami from his birthplace of Havana in order to achieve his goal of becoming a professional footballer, and later joining the Inter Miami academy.

== Club career ==
=== Inter Miami CF II ===
Reyes made his league debut for the club on 18 July 2020, coming on as a 73rd-minute substitute for Andres Cardenas in a 2–0 defeat to the Greenville Triumph.

=== Comunicaciones ===
He joined Comunicaciones at the end of the 2025 calendar year, joining to play in the 2026 Clausura, starting off as one of the more effective players of the tournament, ending with 10 goals and 3 assists in 28 games at the club.

== International career ==
He was called up to the Cuba national team in 2021. He made his debut in a 5-0 2022 FIFA World Cup qualification win over the British Virgin Islands on 2 June 2021, and scored a goal in his team's win.

Reyes was called up to the Cuba national team again for the 2025–26 CONCACAF Series friendly tournament, scoring two goals in the tournament, one in the first game of the tournament against Saint Lucia in a 3–0 win, and one in the last game of the tournament for Cuba against the Dominican Republic in a 1–1 draw.

== International goals ==
No.	Date	Venue	Opponent	Score	Result	Competition
1.	2 June 2021	Estadio Doroteo Guamuch Flores, Guatemala City, Guatemala	British Virgin Islands	5–0	5–0	2022 FIFA World Cup qualification
2.	12 November 2025	Estadio Cibao FC, Santiago de los Caballeros, Dominican Republic	Saint Lucia	3–0	3–0	2025–26 CONCACAF Series
3.	29 March 2026	Estadio Cibao FC, Santiago de los Caballeros, Dominican Republic	Dominican Republic	1–0	1–1	2025–26 CONCACAF Series
