= Bath, Saint Kitts and Nevis =

Bath
- Location in Saint Kitts and Nevis
- Coordinates: 17°08′N 062°37′W
- Country: Saint Kitts and Nevis
- Island: Nevis
- Parish: Saint John Figtree

Bath is a small village on the island of Nevis, in Saint Kitts and Nevis. it is located on the west or Caribbean coast of the island, just south of Charlestown, near the southernmost end of Gallows Bay.

The name of the village is derived from the fact that it is situated near a large volcanic hot spring, which has been used for healing therapeutic bathing for many centuries. During the 18th century, the Bath Hotel, an elegant hotel with a stone two-story bathhouse, was built near the hot spring source. The main building of the hotel has been recently restored, and is currently being used as government offices.

== Tourist Attractions ==
=== Bath Hotel and Spring House ===
The aristocrat John Huggins built the large, stone hotel in 1778. Nevis’ Bath Hotel was the first tourist hotel in the Caribbean. The main building sits on a 7-acre property which includes the thermal Bath Stream. Historically the people of Nevis and international travels have visited the Bath hot springs to enjoy its therapeutic properties.

Some notable dignitaries who have visited the attraction include Lord Nelson, Samuel Taylor Coleridge, and Prince William Henry.

The hotel was a popular destination for tourists for 60 years afterward until it closed down. It reopened in 1912 and was shut down in 1940. With the outbreak of the Second World War, it was repurposed as a training center for the West Indian Regiment.

The hotel and grounds that the baths are on as of March 2021 are owned by the government and are registered in the name of the Nevis Housing and Land development Corporation, which is the legal entity that holds land on behalf of the Nevis Island Administration.

The hotel is currently shut down (May 2022) but the springs are open to the public.

The house is built upon 5 hot springs where the water ranges from 104–108 °F (40–42 °C).
