= Estadio La Polar =

Football stadium in Havana, Cuba

- Interactive map of Estadio La Polar
- Location: Havana, Cuba
- Coordinates: 23.09709°N 82.40188°W
- Capacity: 2,000
- Surface: artificial turf

Construction
- Opened: 20 October 1929

Tenants
- FC La Habana; Cuba national football team

The Estadio La Polar is a historic association football stadium in Havana, Cuba. It has a current seating capacity of 2,000 spectators.

== History ==
Estadio La Polar was originally opened on 20 October 1929. Its name reflects an original sponsorship by the former Polar Brewery which was nearby. After becoming an early symbol of football in Cuba, the stadium suffered several major catastrophes, including a cyclone in 1944 and fire in 1946. After a period of neglect and use as a softball field, the stadium was reopened as a football venue on 25 October 1974 thanks to the efforts of Cuban Revolutionary and martyr Pedro Miret, among others. By 2017 the stadium was again in a state of disrepair and rarely used. That year, the venue was partially refurbished with the installation of artificial turf, making it the first such venue in Cuba.

By the mid 2020s, after twelve years of planning and delays, the Football Association of Cuba began a $1.7 million USD total refurbishment of the facility with funding from FIFA. Notably, the reconstruction included installation of a photovoltaic system for electric and lighting. By August 2026, the stadium renovation was nearly complete and undergoing the FIFA certification process which would allow it to host top-level international matches. After hosting two women's club friendlies in October 2026, the venue hosted international matches again for the first time during the November 2026 international window for 2026–27 CONCACAF Nations League B matches between Cuba, Bonaire, Grenada, and Saint Kitts and Nevis.
