= Stoney Grove Strikers =

Association football club in Nevis

Highlights
- Full name: Stoney Grove Strikers
- League: Nevis Premier Division
- 2013–14: 3rd

Stoney Grove Strikers, known as BAS Stoney Grove Strikers for sponsorship reasons, is a Nevisian association football club based in Charlestown. The team is the second most successful team in the Nevis Premier Division winning the title twice.

== Roster ==
- Delroy Arthurton
- Dequani Newton
- Kester Evans
- Don Dyer
- Naheem Liburd

== Honors ==
- Nevis Premier Division: 2

2006–07, 2009–10
