= Highlights FC =

Association football club in Nevis

Highlights
- Full name: Highlights Football Club
- Founded: 2004
- League: N1 League
- 2016–17: 1st

Highlights FC, known as SL Horsford Highlights FC for sponsorship reasons, is a Nevisian association football club based in Charlestown. The team is the most successful team in the Nevis Premier Division winning the title four times.

== Honors ==
- N1 League: 5

2005–06, 2007–08, 2008–09, 2013–14, 2016–17
