= N1 League =

Association football league in Nevis

- Founded: 2006
- First season: 2006
- Country: Nevis
- Confederation: CONCACAF
- Number of clubs: 7
- Level on pyramid: 1
- International cup(s): CONCACAF Champions League; CFU Club Championship
- Current champions: Horsford Highlights (2016–17)
- Most championships: Horsford Highlights (5)
- Current: 2017–18 N1 League

N1 League, known until 2016 as the Nevis Premier Division, is the top tier of association football in Nevis. The league was created in 2004 and organized by the St. Kitts and Nevis Football Association.

== Clubs for the 2013/14 season ==
- Allstars
- Bath United
- Bronx United
- Combined Schools
- Hardtimes
- Highlights FC
- Stoney Grove Strikers
- Villa International United

== Previous winners ==
- 2004 : Bath United
- 2004/05 : Fitness Pioneers
- 2005/06 : Harris United
- 2006/07 : Stoney Grove Strikers
- 2007/08 : Horsford Highlights
- 2008/09 : Horsford Highlights
- 2009/10 : Stoney Grove Strikers
- 2010/11 : abandoned
- 2011/12 : not held
- 2012/13 : not held
- 2013/14 : Horsford Highlights
- 2014/15 : not held
- 2015/16 : not held
- 2016/17 : Horsford Highlights
- 2017/18 : abandoned

== Performance by club ==
Club	City	Titles	Last title
Horsford Highlights (includes Harris United)		5	2016/17
Stoney Grove Strikers		2	2009/10
Fitness Pioneers		1	2004/05
Bath United		1	2004
