= Bath United =

Association football club in Nevis

- Full name: Bath United
- Chairman: Sherimil Stanley
- Manager: Donald Norville
- League: Nevis Premier Division
- 2025-26: 10th
Home colours	Away colours

Bath United, known as CCC Bath United for sponsorship reasons, is a Nevisian professional football club based in Bath. The team has won one Nevis Premier Division title, in 2004.

== Honors ==
- Nevis Premier Division: 1

2004
