= 2026–27 CONCACAF Nations League Play-in =

International football competition

The 2026–27 CONCACAF Nations League Play-in was the post group stage round of Leagues A and C of the 2026–27 edition of the CONCACAF Nations League, the fifth season of the international football competition involving the men's national teams of the 41 member associations of CONCACAF. It was held from 12 to 17 November 2026.

The play-in round served as a qualifier for the Gold Cup prelims, the pre-Gold Cup competition that determines the final teams to qualify for the 2027 CONCACAF Gold Cup.

== Format ==
The play-in round was contested by the two bottom teams from each group of League A (teams ranked 5th and 6th) and the top four teams from League C (three group winners and the best team among the group runners-up). These eight teams were divided into four ties.

Each tie was played on a home-and-away two-legged basis, with the teams from League A hosting the second legs. If the aggregate score was level at the end of the second leg, the away goals rule will be applied. If away goals were also equal, then 30 minutes of extra time would be played without taking into account the away goals rule during this time. If still tied after extra time, the tie would be decided by a penalty shoot-out.

Winners qualified for the 2027 CONCACAF Gold Cup qualification tournament.

== Seeding ==
Teams were seeded based on their results during the group stage of their respective league, in order to determine the pairings.

League A 5th and 6th placed teams
Rank	Grp	Team	Pld	W	D	L	GF	GA	GD	Pts
1	B	Martinique	4	1	1	2	5	7	−2	4
2	A	Trinidad and Tobago	4	0	1	3	4	7	−3	1
3	B	El Salvador	4	1	1	2	4	10	−6	4
4	A	Nicaragua	4	0	0	4	4	14	−10	0

Source: CONCACAF
Rules for classification: Tiebreakers

League C group winners and best runner-up
Rank	Grp	Team	Pld	W	D	L	GF	GA	GD	Pts
1	A	Montserrat	4	4	0	0	11	1	+10	12
2	C	Saint Martin	4	3	0	1	19	2	+17	9
3	B	Antigua and Barbuda	4	3	0	1	11	3	+8	9
4	C	Aruba	4	3	0	1	8	5	+3	9

Source: CONCACAF
Rules for classification: Tiebreakers

The match-ups are as follows:

- Play-in 1 (PI1): League A best 5th placed team vs League C best group runner-up
- Play-in 2 (PI2): League A worst 5th placed team vs League C third-best group winner
- Play-in 3 (PI3): League A best 6th placed team vs League C second-best group winner
- Play-in 4 (PI4): League A worst 6th placed team vs League C best group winner

== Summary ==
The first legs were played on 12 and 13 November, and the second legs were played on 16 and 17 November 2026. The League A teams hosted the second legs.

Team 1	Agg.	Team 2	1st leg	2nd leg
Aruba	1–1 (a)	Martinique	0–0	1–1
Antigua and Barbuda	3–4	Trinidad and Tobago	2–3	1–1
Saint Martin	1–5	El Salvador	0–2	1–3
Montserrat	1–4	Nicaragua	1–2	0–2

== Matches ==
The fixture list was confirmed by CONCACAF on 24 August 2026, with the matchups being confirmed on 9 October 2026. All match times are in EST (UTC−5) as listed by CONCACAF (local times, if different, are in parentheses).

12 November 2026
17:00 (18:00 UTC−4)

Aruba	0–0	Martinique
	Report

Trinidad Stadium, Oranjestad
Referee: Drew Fischer (Canada)
16 November 2026
19:00 (20:00 UTC−4)

Martinique	1–1	Aruba
Luydens 40' (o.g.)	Report	Martis 28'

Stade Pierre-Aliker, Fort-de-France
Referee: Filip Dujic (Canada)

1–1 on aggregate. Aruba won on away goals and qualified for the 2027 CONCACAF Gold Cup qualification.

12 November 2026
18:00 (19:00 UTC−4)

Antigua and Barbuda	2–3	Trinidad and Tobago
Telfer 3' (o.g.); Satchell 90+3'	Report	Gilbert 15'; Gill 25'; Garcia 45'

Sir Vivian Richards Stadium, St. John's
Referee: Adonis Carrasco (Dominican Republic)
16 November 2026
19:00 (20:00 UTC−4)

Trinidad and Tobago	1–1	Antigua and Barbuda
Gilbert 44'	Report	Massicot 13'

Hasely Crawford Stadium, Port of Spain
Referee: Keylor Herrera (Costa Rica)

Trinidad and Tobago won 4–3 on aggregate and qualified for the 2027 CONCACAF Gold Cup qualification.

13 November 2026
18:00 (19:00 UTC−4)

Saint Martin	0–2	El Salvador
	Report	Gil 34'; Cerritos 83'

SKNFA Technical Center, Basseterre, Saint Kitts and Nevis
Referee: Katia Itzel García (Mexico)
17 November 2026
20:00 (19:00 UTC−6)

El Salvador	3–1	Saint Martin
Osorio 45'; Gil 46', 83'	Report	Dumas 45+3'

Estadio Jorge "El Mágico" González, San Salvador
Referee: Armando Villarreal (United States)

El Salvador won 5–1 on aggregate and qualified for the 2027 CONCACAF Gold Cup qualification.

13 November 2026
19:00 (20:00 UTC−4)

Montserrat	1–2	Nicaragua
Boatswain 35'	Report	Fenton 59' (o.g.); Mejía 72'

Estadio Cibao FC, Santiago, Dominican Republic
Referee: Adonai Escobedo (Mexico)
17 November 2026
22:00 (21:00 UTC−6)

Nicaragua	2–0	Montserrat
Talavera 51'; Salinas 80'	Report

Estadio Nacional, Managua
Referee: Nelson Salgado (Honduras)

Nicaragua won 4–1 on aggregate and qualified for the 2027 CONCACAF Gold Cup qualification.

== Goalscorers ==
There were 20 goals scored in 8 matches, for an average of 2.5 goals per match.

3 goals

- (El Salvador) Brayan Gil

2 goals

- (Trinidad and Tobago) Dantaye Gilbert

1 goal

- (Aruba) Bradley Martis
- (Antigua and Barbuda) Daryl Massicot
- (Antigua and Barbuda) Brandon Satchell
- (El Salvador) Mauricio Cerritos
- (El Salvador) Harold Osorio
- (Montserrat) Ashley Boatswain
- (Nicaragua) Efraín Mejía
- (Nicaragua) Osmin Salinas
- (Nicaragua) Widman Talavera
- (Collectivity of Saint Martin) Belony Dumas
- (Trinidad and Tobago) Justin Garcia
- (Trinidad and Tobago) Real Gill

1 own goal

- (Aruba) Diederick Luydens (against Martinique)
- (Montserrat) Samuel Fenton (against Nicaragua)
- (Trinidad and Tobago) Ryan Telfer (against Antigua and Barbuda)
