= 2027 CONCACAF Gold Cup qualification =

International football competition qualification

2027 CONCACAF Gold Cup Prelims
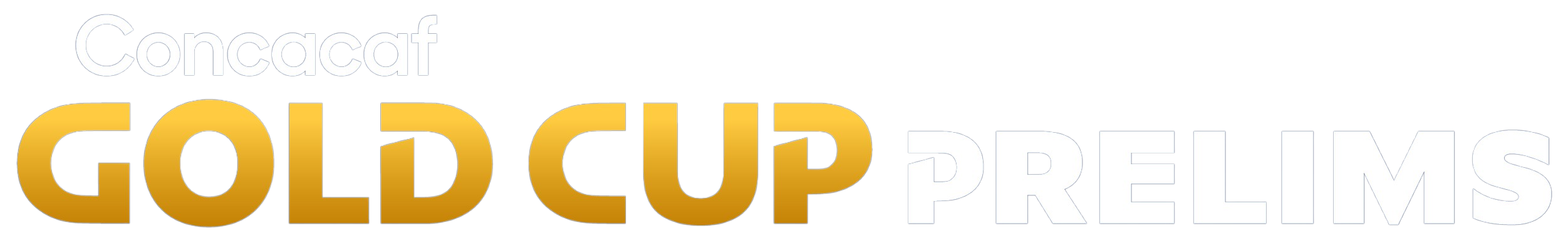

Tournament details
- Dates: March 2027
- Teams: 14

The 2027 CONCACAF Gold Cup qualification or 2027 Gold Cup Prelims will be the tournament that determines the final seven teams to qualify for the 2027 CONCACAF Gold Cup.

The matches will take place in March 2027.

== Format ==
Like the previous Gold Cup Prelims, this edition will consist of a single round in which the 14 involved teams were divided into 7 ties.

The ties were played on a home-and-away two-legged basis, with the highest-ranked team in each tie hosting the second leg. If the aggregate score is level at the end of the second leg the away goals rule would be applied (e.g. the team that scores more goals away from home advanced to the final tournament). If away goals were also equal, then 30 minutes of extra time would be played without taking into account the away goals rule during this time. If still tied after extra time, the tie would be decided by a penalty shoot-out.

The winners will qualify for the 2027 CONCACAF Gold Cup.

== Teams ==
Fourteen teams qualified for the 2027 Gold Cup Prelims through their participation in the 2026–27 CONCACAF Nations League. From Nations League A, the four quarter-final losers as well as the third and fourth-placed teams in both Group A and Group B qualified. From Nations League B, the top-two second-place finishers qualified. The final four spots in the qualification tournament went to the winners of the Nations League Play-in between the top-four teams in Nation League C and the fifth and sixth-placed teams of each group from League A.

The following 14 teams qualified:

League A (QF losers)
QF	Team
QF1	Curaçao
QF2	Guatemala
QF3	Haiti
QF4	Jamaica

League A (3rd and 4th places)
Group	Team
A	Dominican Republic
B	Suriname
A	Costa Rica
B	Honduras

League B (top-2 second places)
Group	Team
A	Puerto Rico
D	French Guiana

Play-in winners
PI	Team
PI1	Aruba
PI2	Trinidad and Tobago
PI3	El Salvador
PI4	Nicaragua

=== Seeding ===
In order to determine the 7 matchups, the teams were seeded 1–14 based on the CONCACAF Rankings as of November 2026, with the 7 highest-ranked teams facing the 7 lowest-ranked teams (1 v 14, 2 v 13, 3 v 12, 4 v 11, 5 v 10, 6 v 9 and 7 v 8).

Seed	Team	Rank	Points
1	Jamaica	5	1,587
2	Costa Rica	6	1,532
3	Haiti	7	1,489
4	Honduras	8	1,464
5	Guatemala	9	1,403
6	Curaçao	10	1,384
7	Suriname	11	1,329
8	Trinidad and Tobago	12	1,178
9	El Salvador	13	1,167
10	Dominican Republic	14	1,162
11	French Guiana	17	1,069
12	Nicaragua	18	1,065
13	Puerto Rico	23	894
14	Aruba	27	686

== Summary ==
The two legs will be played in March 2027.

Team 1	Agg.	Team 2	1st leg	2nd leg
Aruba	–	Jamaica	Mar	Mar
Puerto Rico	–	Costa Rica	Mar	Mar
Nicaragua	–	Haiti	Mar	Mar
French Guiana	–	Honduras	Mar	Mar
Dominican Republic	–	Guatemala	Mar	Mar
El Salvador	–	Curaçao	Mar	Mar
Trinidad and Tobago	–	Suriname	Mar	Mar

== Matches ==
The fixture list and matchups were confirmed on TBD. All match times are in EDT (UTC−4) (local times, if different, are in parentheses).

== Qualified teams ==
Team	Qualified as	Qualified on	Previous appearances in CONCACAF Gold Cup^{1} only Gold Cup era (since 1991)
Saudi Arabia	Invites	19 December 2024	1 (2025)
Panama	CNL League A quarterfinal winner	15 November 2026	12 (1993, 2005, 2007, 2009, 2011, 2013, 2015, 2017, 2019, 2021, 2023, 2025)
Cuba	CNL League B Group C winner	16 November 2026	10 (1998, 2002, 2003, 2005, 2007, 2011, 2013, 2015, 2019, 2023)
Guyana	CNL League B Group A winner	16 November 2026	1 (2019)
Canada	CNL League A quarterfinal winner	16 November 2026	17 (1991, 1993, 1996, **2000**, 2002, 2003, 2005, 2007, 2009, 2011, 2013, 2015, 2017, 2019, 2021, 2023, 2025)
Saint Lucia	CNL League B Group B winner	17 November 2026	0 (Debut)
Saint Vincent and the Grenadines	CNL League B Group D winner	17 November 2026	1 (1996)
United States	CNL League A quarterfinal winner	17 November 2026	18 (**1991**, 1993, 1996, 1998, 2000, **2002**, 2003, **2005**, **2007**, 2009, 2011, **2013**, 2015, **2017**, 2019, **2021**, 2023, 2025)
Mexico	CNL League A quarterfinal winner	17 November 2026	18 (1991, **1993**, **1996**, **1998**, 2000, 2002, **2003**, 2005, 2007, **2009**, **2011**, 2013, **2015**, 2017, **2019**, 2021, **2023**, **2025**)

^{1} Bold indicates champions for that year. Italic indicates hosts for that year.

== Goalscorers ==
There were 0 goals scored in 0 matches, for an average of -nan goals per match.
