= 2026–27 CONCACAF Nations League =

Association football tournament

Tournament details
- Dates: Leagues A and C: 23 September – 6 October 2026; League B: 24 September – 17 November 2026; League A quarter-finals: 9–17 November 2026; Leagues A and B Finals: 25–29 March 2027; League C Finals: 9–12 June 2027
- Teams: 41

Tournament statistics
- Matches played: 74
- Goals scored: 249 (3.36 per match)
- Top scorer: (Saint Kitts and Nevis) Tiquanny Williams (12 goals)
- All statistics correct as of 6 October 2026.

The 2026–27 CONCACAF Nations League is the fifth season of the CONCACAF Nations League, an international association football competition involving the men's senior national teams of the 41 member associations of CONCACAF. The competition began with the group stage in September 2026 and is scheduled to conclude with the finals of Leagues A and B in March 2027. The finals of League C will take place in June 2027.

The competition also serves as the qualifying tournament for the 2027 CONCACAF Gold Cup, with teams qualifying directly or advancing to the Gold Cup preliminary round based on their results in the Nations League.

== Format ==
The competition continues to be played across three leagues. The format introduced for the 2023–24 season remains in use, while centralized finals for Leagues B and C are being introduced for the first time.

=== League A ===
League A features sixteen teams. The four highest-ranked League A teams, based on the CONCACAF Ranking Index of 20 July 2026, were pre-seeded directly into the quarter-finals. The remaining twelve teams were divided into two groups of six, with each team playing four matches against opponents of its group (two at home and two away) on a Swiss-system basis. The opponents scheduled in the fixture released by CONCACAF on 24 July 2026 were listed by corresponding pot below:

- Pot 1: home to Pots 2 and 4, away to Pots 2 and 5
- Pot 2: home to Pots 1 and 3, away to Pots 1 and 6
- Pot 3: home to Pots 4 and 6, away to Pots 2 and 4
- Pot 4: home to Pots 3 and 5, away to Pots 1 and 3
- Pot 5: home to Pots 1 and 6, away to Pots 4 and 6
- Pot 6: home to Pots 2 and 5, away to Pots 3 and 5

The top two teams in each group advanced to the quarter-finals. The teams finishing third and fourth advanced to the Gold Cup preliminary round, while the teams finishing fifth and sixth were relegated to League B and advanced to the Nations League Play-In.

The four teams advancing from the group stage joined the four pre-seeded teams in the quarter-finals. The ties will be played over two legs on a home-and-away basis. The group stage qualifiers were ranked according to their results and paired as follows:

- Quarter-final 1: fourth-ranked pre-seeded team against the best group winner;
- Quarter-final 2: third-ranked pre-seeded team against the other group winner;
- Quarter-final 3: second-ranked pre-seeded team against the best group runner-up;
- Quarter-final 4: first-ranked pre-seeded team against the other group runner-up.

The four quarter-final winners will qualify directly for the 2027 CONCACAF Gold Cup and advance to the League A Finals. The four quarter-final losers will advance to the Gold Cup preliminary round.

The League A Finals will consist of two semi-finals, a third-place match and a final. The four quarter-final winners will be ranked according to their quarter-final performances, with the highest-ranked team facing the fourth-ranked team and the second-ranked team facing the third-ranked team in the semi-finals.

=== League B ===
League B features sixteen teams divided into four groups of four. Each team will face every other team in its group twice in a home-and-away double round-robin format, playing six matches in total.

Matches will be held at centralized venues during each FIFA international window. The third-highest-ranked team in each group hosted the first set of September–October matches, the second-highest-ranked team hosted the second set, and the highest-ranked team will host the November matches.

The four group winners will be promoted to League A, qualify directly for the 2027 CONCACAF Gold Cup and advance to the League B Finals. The two best group runners-up will advance to the Gold Cup preliminary round. The four fourth-placed teams will be relegated to League C.

The League B Finals will consist of two semi-finals, a third-place match and a final.

=== League C ===
League C features nine teams divided into three groups of three. Each team played every other team in its group twice in a double round-robin format, playing four matches in total. Group stage matches were played at centralized venues hosted by the highest-ranked team in each group.

The three group winners and the best runner-up were promoted to League B, advanced to the Nations League Play-In, and qualified for the League C Finals. The League C Finals will consist of two semi-finals, a third-place match and a final.

=== Nations League Play-In ===
The Nations League Play-In features the fifth and sixth-placed teams from both League A groups, the three League C group winners and the best League C runner-up. The four ties will be played over two legs on a home-and-away basis.

The teams were ranked according to their group-stage performances and paired as follows:

- Play-In 1: best fifth-placed League A team against the best League C runner-up;
- Play-In 2: other fifth-placed League A team against the third-ranked League C group winner;
- Play-In 3: best sixth-placed League A team against the second-ranked League C group winner;
- Play-In 4: other sixth-placed League A team against the highest-ranked League C group winner.

The four play-in winners will advance to the 2027 CONCACAF Gold Cup preliminary round.

=== Tiebreakers ===
The ranking of teams in each group is determined as follows (Regulations Article 12.6):

1. Points obtained in all group matches (three points for a win, one for a draw, zero for a loss);
2. Goal difference in all group matches;
3. Number of goals scored in all group matches;

If two or more teams are still tied based on the above criteria, their rankings are determined as follows:

1. Points obtained in the matches played between the teams in question;
2. Goal difference in the matches played between the teams in question;
3. Number of goals scored in the matches played between the teams in question;
4. Number of away goals scored in the matches played between the teams in question (if the tie is only between two teams);
5. Lowest number of disciplinary points in all group matches (only one deduction can be applied to a player in a single match):
  - Yellow card: 1 points;
  - Indirect red card (second yellow card): 3 points;
  - Direct red card: 4 points;
  - Yellow card and direct red card: 5 points;
6. Drawing of lots.

== Entrants ==
All 41 CONCACAF member associations will participate in the competition. Teams were allocated to leagues based on the results of the 2024–25 CONCACAF Nations League. Fifth and sixth-placed teams in League A and fourth-placed teams in League B were relegated, while the League B and League C group winners and the best League C runner-up were promoted.

League A

- Canada
- Costa Rica
- Curaçao (▲)
- Dominican Republic (▲)
- El Salvador (▲)
- Guatemala
- Haiti (▲)
- Honduras
- Jamaica
- Martinique
- Mexico
- Nicaragua
- Panama
- Suriname
- Trinidad and Tobago
- United States

League B

- Barbados (▲)
- Belize (▲)
- Bermuda
- Bonaire
- Cayman Islands (▲)
- Cuba (▼)
- Dominica
- French Guiana (▼)
- Guadeloupe (▼)
- Grenada
- Guyana (▼)
- Puerto Rico
- Saint Kitts and Nevis (▲)
- Saint Lucia
- Saint Vincent and the Grenadines
- Sint Maarten

League C

- Anguilla
- Antigua and Barbuda (▼)
- Aruba (▼)
- Bahamas
- British Virgin Islands
- Montserrat (▼)
- Saint Martin (▼)
- Turks and Caicos Islands
- U.S. Virgin Islands

== Draw ==
The official group stage draw was held on 23 July 2026 at 19:00 EDT. Teams participating in each league's group stage were allocated into pots based on the CONCACAF Ranking Index as of 20 July 2026.

All of CONCACAF's 41 member associations entered the competition. Teams were divided into leagues based on their results from the 2024–25 season. Fifth- and sixth-placed teams in League A and the fourth-placed teams in League B from the 2024–25 season moved down a league, while the teams that finished top of each group in Leagues B and C moved up, as did the best second-placed team of League C. The remaining teams stayed in their respective leagues.

League A
Pot	Team	Prv	Pts	Rank
QF	Mexico	Same position	2,112	1
QF	United States	Same position	1,833	2
QF	Canada	Same position	1,799	3
QF	Panama	Same position	1,685	4
1	Costa Rica	Same position	1,624	5
1	Honduras	Same position	1,549	6
2	Jamaica	Same position	1,515	7
2	Haiti	▲	1,452	8
3	Guatemala	Same position	1,436	9
3	Trinidad and Tobago	Same position	1,356	10
4	Curaçao	▲	1,335	11
4	Suriname	Same position	1,289	12
5	Martinique	Same position	1,202	13
5	Nicaragua	Same position	1,141	15
6	El Salvador	▲	1,127	16
6	Dominican Republic	▲	1,046	18

League B
Pot	Team	Prv	Pts	Rank
1	Guadeloupe	▼	1,152	14
1	Guyana	▼	1,064	17
1	Cuba	▼	1,014	19
1	French Guiana	▼	950	20
2	Saint Vincent and the Grenadines	Same position	873	21
2	Puerto Rico	Same position	865	22
2	Bermuda	Same position	835	23
2	Grenada	Same position	809	24
3	Saint Lucia	Same position	772	25
3	Saint Kitts and Nevis	▲	770	26
3	Belize	▲	735	27
3	Dominica	Same position	618	29
4	Sint Maarten	Same position	603	30
4	Bonaire	Same position	554	32
4	Barbados	▲	547	34
4	Cayman Islands	▲	433	36

League C
Pot	Team	Prv	Pts	Rank
1	Montserrat	▼	720	28
1	Saint Martin	▼	584	31
1	Antigua and Barbuda	▼	553	33
2	Aruba	▼	542	35
2	Bahamas	Same position	387	37
2	Turks and Caicos Islands	Same position	272	38
3	British Virgin Islands	Same position	160	39
3	Anguilla	Same position	149	40
3	U.S. Virgin Islands	Same position	116	41

== Schedule ==
The schedule of the 2026–27 CONCACAF Nations League is as follows:

Round			Date or corresponding FIFA window
League A	League B	League C	Date or corresponding FIFA window
Matchday 1			23 September – 6 October 2026
Matchday 2			23 September – 6 October 2026
Matchday 3			23 September – 6 October 2026
Matchday 4			23 September – 6 October 2026
Quarter-finals and play-in	Matchday 5	Play-in	9–17 November 2026
Quarter-finals and play-in	Matchday 6	Play-in	9–17 November 2026
Finals		—N/a	25–29 March 2027
—N/a		Finals	9–12 June 2027

== 2027 CONCACAF Gold Cup qualification ==
The Nations League will determine the teams qualifying directly for the 2027 CONCACAF Gold Cup and those advancing to the Gold Cup preliminary round.

Eight teams will qualify directly to the group stage:

- Four League A quarter-final round winners
- Four League B group winners

Fourteen teams will qualify for the preliminary round:

- Four League A quarter-final round losers
- Four League A group teams (third and fourth-place)
- Two League B group runners-up
- Four League A/C play-in round winners

== League A ==
=== Group A ===
Pos	Team	Pld	W	D	L	GF	GA	GD	Pts	Qualification or relegation	(Curaçao)	(Haiti)	(Dominican Republic)	(Costa Rica)	(Trinidad and Tobago)	(Nicaragua)
1	Curaçao	4	3	1	0	12	5	+7	10	Advance to quarter-finals	—	—	—	—	1–0	6–1
2	Haiti	4	3	0	1	9	5	+4	9	Advance to quarter-finals	—	—	—	2–0	3–2	—
3	Dominican Republic	4	3	0	1	8	8	0	9	Qualification for Gold Cup prelims	—	1–4	—	—	—	3–2
4	Costa Rica	4	2	0	2	8	6	+2	6	Qualification for Gold Cup prelims	3–4	2–0	—	—	—	—
5	Trinidad and Tobago (R)	4	0	1	3	4	7	−3	1	Advance to play-in and relegation to League B	1–1	—	1–2	—	—	—
6	Nicaragua (R)	4	0	0	4	4	14	−10	0	Advance to play-in and relegation to League B	—	—	1–2	0–3	—	—

Source: CONCACAF
Rules for classification: Tiebreakers
(R) Relegated

=== Group B ===
Pos	Team	Pld	W	D	L	GF	GA	GD	Pts	Qualification or relegation	(Guatemala)	(Jamaica)	(Suriname)	(Honduras)	(Martinique)	(El Salvador)
1	Guatemala	4	2	1	1	9	3	+6	7	Advance to quarter-finals	—	—	1–0	—	—	6–0
2	Jamaica	4	2	1	1	6	4	+2	7	Advance to quarter-finals	3–2	—	—	0–1	—	—
3	Suriname	4	2	1	1	5	4	+1	7	Qualification for Gold Cup prelims	0–0	—	—	—	2–1	—
4	Honduras	4	1	1	2	5	6	−1	4	Qualification for Gold Cup prelims	—	1–1	2–3	—	—	—
5	Martinique (R)	4	1	1	2	5	7	−2	4	Advance to play-in and relegation to League B	—	—	—	2–1	—	1–1
6	El Salvador (R)	4	1	1	2	4	10	−6	4	Advance to play-in and relegation to League B	—	0–2	—	—	3–1	—

Source: CONCACAF
Rules for classification: Tiebreakers
(R) Relegated

=== Quarter-finals ===
The quarter-finals pairings were determined based on the CONCACAF Rankings published on 20 July 2026 for the four pre-seeded teams and the group stage results for the winners and runners-up of each group.

Pre-seeded teams
Pos	Team	Rank (Note: CONCACAF rankings (as of 20 July 2026))	Pts
1	Mexico	1	2,112
2	United States	2	1,833
3	Canada	3	1,799
4	Panama	4	1,685

Group stage winners and runners-up
Rank	Grp	Team	Pld	W	D	L	GF	GA	GD	Pts
1	A	Curaçao	4	3	1	0	12	5	+7	10
2	B	Guatemala	4	2	1	1	9	3	+6	7
3	A	Haiti	4	3	0	1	9	5	+4	9
4	B	Jamaica	4	2	1	1	6	4	+2	7

Source: CONCACAF
Rules for classification: Tiebreakers

The match-ups were as follows:

- Quarter-final 1 (QF1): Fourth ranked pre-seeded team (Panama) vs Best ranked group winner (Curaçao)
- Quarter-final 2 (QF2): Third ranked pre-seeded team (Canada) vs Next ranked group winner (Guatemala)
- Quarter-final 3 (QF3): Second ranked pre-seeded team (United States) vs Best ranked group runner-up (Haiti)
- Quarter-final 4 (QF4): First ranked pre-seeded team (Mexico) vs Next ranked group runner-up (Jamaica)

The first legs were played on 12–14 November and the second legs were played on 15–17 November 2026.

Team 1	Agg.	Team 2	1st leg	2nd leg
Curaçao	0–2	Panama	0–0	0–2
Guatemala	3–7	Canada	2–3	1–4
Haiti	0–8	United States	0–6	0–2
Jamaica	3–3 (a)	Mexico	3–2	0–1

=== Nations League Finals ===
==== Seeding ====
To determine the semi-final matchups, the four teams were ranked based on their results in the two quarter-final legs. The first seed will play the fourth seed and the second seed will play the third seed.

Seed	QF	Team	Pld	W	D	L	GF	GA	GD	Pts
1	QF3	United States	2	2	0	0	8	0	+8	6
2	QF2	Canada	2	2	0	0	7	3	+4	6
3	QF1	Panama	2	1	1	0	2	0	+2	4
4	QF4	Mexico	2	1	0	1	3	3	0	3

Source: CONCACAF
Rules for classification: Tiebreakers

==== Bracket ====
Semi-finals
25 March – Inglewood
Canada
Panama
25 March – Inglewood
United States
Mexico

Final
28 March – Inglewood
Winner Match 1
Winner Match 2
Third place play-off
28 March – Inglewood
Loser Match 1
Loser Match 2

==== Semi-finals ====
25 March 2027
19:00 (16:00 UTC−7)

Canada	Match 1	Panama
	Report

SoFi Stadium, Inglewood

25 March 2027
22:15 (19:15 UTC−7)

United States	Match 2	Mexico
	Report

SoFi Stadium, Inglewood

==== Third place play-off ====
28 March 2027
17:15 (14:15 UTC−7)

Loser Match 1	Match 3	Loser Match 2

SoFi Stadium, Inglewood

==== Final ====
28 March 2027
20:30 (17:30 UTC−7)

Winner Match 1	Match 4	Winner Match 2

SoFi Stadium, Inglewood

== League B ==
=== Group A ===
Pos	Team	Pld	W	D	L	GF	GA	GD	Pts	Qualification or relegation	(Guyana)	(Puerto Rico)	(Dominica)	(Cayman Islands)
1	Guyana (H, P)	6	6	0	0	26	4	+22	18	Promotion to League A, qualification for Gold Cup, and advance to semi-finals	—	4–2	8–1	2–0
2	Puerto Rico (H)	6	4	0	2	12	7	+5	12	Qualification for Gold Cup prelims	0–1	—	4–2	1–0
3	Dominica (H)	6	1	1	4	9	19	−10	4		1–5	0–2	—	5–0
4	Cayman Islands (R)	6	0	1	5	0	17	−17	1	Relegation to League C	0–6	0–3	0–0	—

Source: CONCACAF
Rules for classification: Tiebreakers
(H) Hosts; (P) Promoted; (R) Relegated

=== Group B ===
Pos	Team	Pld	W	D	L	GF	GA	GD	Pts	Qualification or relegation	(Saint Lucia)	(Guadeloupe)	(Barbados)	(Bermuda)
1	Saint Lucia (H, P)	6	5	0	1	13	5	+8	15	Promotion to League A, qualification for Gold Cup, and advance to semi-finals	—	3–0	2–0	5–2
2	Guadeloupe (H)	6	3	1	2	11	8	+3	10		0–1	—	2–2	4–1
3	Barbados (H)	6	3	1	2	10	9	+1	10		2–0	0–3	—	4–1
4	Bermuda (R)	6	0	0	6	7	19	−12	0	Relegation to League C	1–2	1–2	1–2	—

Source: CONCACAF
Rules for classification: Tiebreakers
(H) Hosts; (P) Promoted; (R) Relegated

=== Group C ===
Pos	Team	Pld	W	D	L	GF	GA	GD	Pts	Qualification or relegation	(Cuba)	(Saint Kitts and Nevis)	(Grenada)	(Bonaire)
1	Cuba (H, P)	6	4	2	0	26	6	+20	14	Promotion to League A, qualification for Gold Cup, and advance to semi-finals	—	2–2	9–0	2–0
2	Saint Kitts and Nevis (H)	6	3	2	1	12	9	+3	11		3–3	—	3–0	3–2
3	Grenada	6	2	0	4	7	23	−16	6		0–3	3–2	—	1–4
4	Bonaire (R)	6	1	0	5	10	18	−8	3	Relegation to League C	1–7	1–2	2–3	—

Source: CONCACAF
Rules for classification: Tiebreakers
(H) Hosts; (P) Promoted; (R) Relegated

=== Group D ===
Pos	Team	Pld	W	D	L	GF	GA	GD	Pts	Qualification or relegation	(Saint Vincent and the Grenadines)	(French Guiana)	(Belize)	(Sint Maarten)
1	Saint Vincent and the Grenadines (H, P)	6	5	0	1	12	4	+8	15	Promotion to League A, qualification for Gold Cup, and advance to semi-finals	—	2–1	1–0	4–0
2	French Guiana (H)	6	5	0	1	11	3	+8	15	Qualification for Gold Cup prelims	1–0	—	1–0	1–0
3	Belize (H)	6	1	0	5	2	7	−5	3		0–1	0–2	—	1–2
4	Sint Maarten (R)	6	1	0	5	5	16	−11	3	Relegation to League C	2–4	1–5	0–1	—

Source: CONCACAF
Rules for classification: Tiebreakers
(H) Hosts; (P) Promoted; (R) Relegated

=== Ranking of second-placed teams ===
Pos	Grp	Team	Pld	W	D	L	GF	GA	GD	Pts	Qualification
1	D	French Guiana	6	5	0	1	11	3	+8	15	Qualification for Gold Cup prelims
2	A	Puerto Rico	6	4	0	2	12	7	+5	12	Qualification for Gold Cup prelims
3	C	Saint Kitts and Nevis	6	3	2	1	12	9	+3	11	
4	B	Guadeloupe	6	3	1	2	11	8	+3	10	

Source: CONCACAF
Rules for classification: Tiebreakers

=== Finals ===
Semi-finals
March 2027 – TBD
Guyana
Cuba
March 2027 – TBD
Saint Lucia
Saint Vincent and the Grenadines

Final
March 2027 – TBD
Winner SF1
Winner SF2
Third place play-off
March 2027 – TBD
Loser SF1
Loser SF2

== League C ==
=== Group A ===
Pos	Team	Pld	W	D	L	GF	GA	GD	Pts	Qualification or relegation	(Montserrat)	(Turks and Caicos Islands)	(British Virgin Islands)
1	Montserrat (P)	4	4	0	0	11	1	+10	12	Promotion to League B, advance to play-in and semi-finals	—	4–1	3–0
2	Turks and Caicos Islands (H)	4	2	0	2	7	6	+1	6		0–2	—	3–0
3	British Virgin Islands	4	0	0	4	0	11	−11	0		0–2	0–3	—

Source: CONCACAF
Rules for classification: Tiebreakers
(H) Hosts; (P) Promoted

=== Group B ===
Pos	Team	Pld	W	D	L	GF	GA	GD	Pts	Qualification or relegation	(Antigua and Barbuda)	(Aruba)	(Anguilla)
1	Antigua and Barbuda (H, P)	4	3	0	1	11	3	+8	9	Promotion to League B, advance to play-in and semi-finals	—	3–2	5–0
2	Aruba (P)	4	3	0	1	8	5	+3	9	Promotion to League B, advance to play-in and semi-finals	1–0	—	3–2
3	Anguilla	4	0	0	4	2	13	−11	0		0–3	0–2	—

Source: CONCACAF
Rules for classification: Tiebreakers
(H) Hosts; (P) Promoted

=== Group C ===
Pos	Team	Pld	W	D	L	GF	GA	GD	Pts	Qualification or relegation	(Collectivity of Saint Martin)	(United States Virgin Islands)	(The Bahamas)
1	Saint Martin (P)	4	3	0	1	19	2	+17	9	Promotion to League B, advance to play-in and semi-finals	—	0–2	6–0
2	U.S. Virgin Islands (H)	4	3	0	1	8	8	0	9		0–5	—	3–1
3	Bahamas	4	0	0	4	3	20	−17	0		0–8	2–3	—

Source: CONCACAF
Rules for classification: Tiebreakers
(H) Hosts; (P) Promoted

=== Ranking of second-placed teams ===
Pos	Grp	Team	Pld	W	D	L	GF	GA	GD	Pts	Qualification
1	B	Aruba (P)	4	3	0	1	8	5	+3	9	Promotion to League B, advance to play-in and semi-finals
2	C	U.S. Virgin Islands	4	3	0	1	8	8	0	9	
3	A	Turks and Caicos Islands	4	2	0	2	7	6	+1	6	

Source: CONCACAF
Rules for classification: Tiebreakers
(P) Promoted

=== Finals ===
Semi-finals
June 2027 – TBD
Montserrat
Aruba
June 2027 – TBD
Saint Martin
Antigua and Barbuda

Final
June 2027 – TBD
Winner SF1
Winner SF2
Third place play-off
June 2027 – TBD
Loser SF1
Loser SF2

== Play-in round ==
The first legs were played on 12 and 13 November, and the second legs were played on 16 and 17 November 2026. The League A teams hosted the second legs.

Team 1	Agg.	Team 2	1st leg	2nd leg
Aruba	1–1 (a)	Martinique	0–0	1–1
Antigua and Barbuda	3–4	Trinidad and Tobago	2–3	1–1
Saint Martin	1–5	El Salvador	0–2	1–3
Montserrat	1–4	Nicaragua	1–2	0–2

== Top goalscorers ==
As of matches played 12 November 2026

League A
Rank	Player	Goals
1	(Costa Rica) Carlos Mora	4
1	(Curaçao) Kenji Gorré	4
3	(Dominican Republic) Heinz Mörschel	3
3	(Guatemala) William Fajardo	3
3	(Haiti) Wilson Isidor	3
6	Ten players	2

League B
Rank	Player	Goals
1	(Saint Kitts and Nevis) Tiquanny Williams	8
2	(Barbados) Thierry Gale	6
2	(Saint Vincent and the Grenadines) Oalex Anderson	6
4	(Cuba) Daniel Díaz	4
4	(Cuba) Yunior Pérez	4
4	(Guyana) Osaze De Rosario	4
4	(Guyana) Omari Glasgow	4
4	(Saint Lucia) Kegan Caull	4
9	(Barbados) Niall Reid-Stephen	3
9	(Bonaire) Myron Bostdorp	3
9	(Guadeloupe) Djamalee Boisné	3
9	(Guyana) Deon Moore	3

League C
Rank	Player	Goals
1	(Collectivity of Saint Martin) Axel Raga	7
2	(Collectivity of Saint Martin) Pierre-Bertrand Arné	5
3	(Montserrat) Lyle Taylor	4
4	(Antigua and Barbuda) D'Andre Bishop	3
4	(Montserrat) Ashley Boatswain	3
4	(Collectivity of Saint Martin) Jordan Alexandre	3
4	(Turks and Caicos Islands) Billy Forbes	3
8	Six players	2

Source: CONCACAF
