= Nicaragua national football team =

Men's association football team

Nicaragua
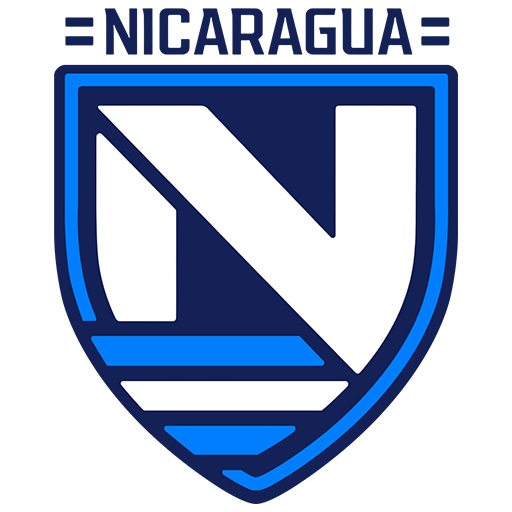
- Nickname(s): La Azul y Blanco (The Blue and White); Los Pinoleros (The Pinoleros)
- Association: Federación Nicaragüense de Fútbol (FENIFUT)
- Confederation: CONCACAF (North America)
- Sub-confederation: UNCAF (Central America)
- Head coach: Juan Cruz Real
- Captain: Juan Barrera
- Most caps: Josué Quijano (108)
- Top scorer: Juan Barrera (26)
- Home stadium: Estadio Nacional de Fútbol
- FIFA code: NCA
First colours	Second colours	Third colours

FIFA ranking
- Current: 137 ▼6 (7 October 2026)
- Highest: 92 (December 2015)
- Lowest: 193 (May 2001)

First international
- El Salvador 9–0 Nicaragua (San Salvador, El Salvador; 1 May 1929)

Biggest win
- Turks and Caicos Islands 0–7 Nicaragua (San Cristóbal, Dominican Republic; 27 March 2021)

Biggest defeat
- Honduras 10–0 Nicaragua (San José, Costa Rica; 13 March 1946); Curaçao 11–1 Nicaragua (Guatemala City, Guatemala; 2 March 1950)

CONCACAF Championship / Gold Cup
- Appearances: 5 (first in 1963)
- Best result: Sixth place (1967)

CCCF Championship
- Appearances: 6 (first in 1941)
- Best result: Third place (1951)

Copa Centroamericana
- Appearances: 14 (first in 1991)
- Best result: Fifth place (2005, 2009, 2017)
Medal record
CCCF Championship
Bronze medal – third place	1951 Panama	Team

The Nicaragua national football team (Spanish: Selección de fútbol de Nicaragua) represents Nicaragua in men's international football, and is governed by the Nicaraguan Football Federation (Spanish: Federación Nicaragüense de Fútbol), the governing body for football in Nicaragua founded in 1931. It has been a full member of FIFA since 1950, is a founding member of CONCACAF which was founded in 1961, and is also a member of UNCAF in the Central American Zone. From 1938 to 1961, the team was a member of CCCF, the former governing body of football in Central America and Caribbean and a predecessor confederation of CONCACAF. Nicaragua was also a member of PFC, the former unified confederation of the Americas.

Nicaragua has never qualified for the FIFA World Cup, but has participated five times in CONCACAF's premier continental competition, finishing sixth place in the 1967 CONCACAF Championship. The team has participated twice in League A and three times in League B of the CONCACAF Nations League.

In subcontinental competitions, the team finished as third place in the 1957 CCCF Championship, and also finished as fifth place three times in the Copa Centroamericana.

Nicaragua's debut in international competition was in the 1941 CCCF Championship, and the team's first appearance in World Cup qualifiers was for 1994 CONCACAF qualification.

== History ==
Nicaragua traveled to El Salvador for their first ever international, losing 9–0 to the hosts on 1 May 1929. They did not play another match for over twelve years, until the qualifying group for the 1941 CCCF Championship in Costa Rica. They lost all 4 games: 7–2 to the hosts Costa Rica on 10 May, 8–0 to El Salvador on 13 May, 9–1 to the Netherlands Antilles on 15 May and 5–2 to Panama on 18 May. Therefore, Nicaragua finished bottom of the group and did not make the final group.

=== Recent times ===
After qualifying for the 2019 Gold Cup on the back of finishing ninth in Nations League qualifying, they would go on to finish bottom of the group with losses to Costa Rica, Haiti and Bermuda.

Nicaragua qualified directly for the 2023 Gold Cup and was promoted to Nations League A as group winners in Nations League B but was disqualified on 12 June 2023 for fielding an ineligible player. As a result, they were replaced in the Gold Cup and League A by Trinidad and Tobago, who was the best second-place team overall in League B and must stay in Nations League B.

== Team image ==
=== Kit sponsorship ===
Kit supplier	Period
(Germany) Puma	1998-2003
(Spain) Joma	2004–2021
(Mexico) Keuka	2022–2024
(United States) Orion	2025-present

== Results and fixtures ==
The following is a list of match results in the last 12 months, as well as any future matches that have been scheduled.

Win Draw Loss Fixture

=== 2025 ===
13 November 2026 FIFA World Cup qualification	Nicaragua	2–0	Honduras	Managua, Nicaragua
20:00 UTC−6	Hernández 12'; Moreno 82'	Report		Stadium: Estadio Nacional; Referee: Ismail Elfath (United States)

18 November 2026 FIFA World Cup qualification	Haiti	2–0	Nicaragua	Willemstad, Curaçao
21:00 UTC−4	Louicius 9'; Providence 45+1'	Report		Stadium: Ergilio Hato Stadium; Referee: Mario Escobar (Guatemala)

=== 2026 ===
27 March Friendly	Russia	3–1	Nicaragua	Krasnodar, Russia
19:30 UTC+3	Sadulayev 3'; Tyukavin 45+3' (pen.); Golovin 83'	Report	Acevedo 16'; Reyes (red card) 47'	Stadium: Krasnodar Stadium; Attendance: 31,625; Referee: Abdurashid Khudoyberganov (Uzbekistan)

29 May Friendly	South Africa	0–0	Nicaragua	Soweto, South Africa
21:30 UTC+2		Report		Stadium: Orlando Stadium; Referee: Lebalang Mokete (Lesotho)

5 June Friendly	Paraguay	4–0	Nicaragua	Asunción, Paraguay
19:15 UTC−3	Kaku 17' (pen.); Almirón 42'; Galarza 62'; Maidana 67'	Report		Stadium: Estadio Defensores del Chaco; Attendance: 35,000; Referee: Maximiliano Ramírez (Argentina)

24 September 2026–27 Nations League	Dominican Republic	3–2	Nicaragua	Santiago, Dominican Republic
20:00 UTC−4	Mörschel 5'; Díaz 15'; Rosario 90+7'	Report	Pérez 40'; Bonilla 84'	Stadium: Estadio Cibao FC; Attendance: 3,273; Referee: Selvin Brown (Honduras)

27 September 2026–27 Nations League	Curaçao	6–1	Nicaragua	Willemstad, Curaçao
20:00 UTC−4	Comenencia 6'; Gorré 11', 39'; L. Bacuna 19'; J. Bacuna 27'; Locadia 88'	Report	Moreno 62'	Stadium: Ergilio Hato Stadium; Attendance: 7,485; Referee: Saíd Martínez (Honduras)

1 October 2026–27 Nations League	Nicaragua	0–3	Costa Rica	Managua, Nicaragua
20:00 UTC−6		Report	Sinclair 57'; Mora 60'; Michel 90+7'	Stadium: Estadio Nacional de Fútbol; Attendance: 14,745; Referee: Walter López (Guatemala)

4 October 2026–27 Nations League	Nicaragua	1–2	Dominican Republic	Managua, Nicaragua
20:00 UTC−6	Moreno 53'	Report	Mörschel 58' (pen.); Bretón 66'	Stadium: Estadio Nacional de Fútbol; Referee: Ismael Cornejo (El Salvador)

13 November 2026–27 Nations League Play-in	Montserrat	1–2	Nicaragua	Santiago, Dominican Republic
20:00 UTC−4	Boatswain 35'	Report	Fenton 59' (o.g.); Mejía 72'	Stadium: Estadio Cibao FC; Referee: Adonai Escobedo (Mexico)

17 November 2026–27 Nations League Play-in	Nicaragua	2–0 (4–1 agg.)	Montserrat	Managua, Nicaragua
21:00 UTC−6	Talavera 51'; Salinas 80'	Report		Stadium: Estadio Nacional; Referee: Nelson Salgado (Honduras)
Note: Nicaragua won 4–1 on aggregate and qualified for the 2027 Gold Cup qualification.

== Coaching staff ==
Position	Name
Technical director	(Nicaragua) Roger Rodriguez
Caretaker Head coach	(Argentina) Juan Cruz Real
Assistant coach	Vacant
Assistant coach	Vacant
Goalkeeping coach	Vacant
Physical coordinator	Vacant
Doctor	Vacant
Physiotherapist	Vacant
Team coordinator	(Nicaragua) Cesar Castro Trinidad
Team coordinator	(Nicaragua) Nestor Díaz

=== Coaching history ===
- (Nicaragua) Octavio Edmundo Salas Urbina (1941–1943)
- (Hungary) Eduardo Kosovic (1943)
- (Costa Rica) José Antonio Pipa Cordero (1947)
- (Costa Rica) Santiago Bonilla (1952–1953)
- (Hungary) Ferenc Mészáros (1961)
- (Nicaragua) Carlos Ruiz (1961–1962)
- (Argentina) Santiago Berrini (1965–1967)
- (Nicaragua) Livio Bendaña Espinoza (1967–1969)
- (Argentina) Omar Muraco (1969–1970)
- (Nicaragua) Salvador Dubois Leiva (1977, 1991–1992)
- (Argentina) Orlando Casares (1980–1981)
- (Czechoslovakia) Ján Fülöp (1984–1986)
- (Nicaragua) Mauricio Cruz Jiron (1993–2001, 2008)
- (Nicaragua) Florencio Levia (2001–2002)
- (Italy) Maurizio Battistini (2003–2004)
- (Argentina) Marcelo Javier Zuleta (2005)
- (Argentina) Carlos de Toro (2007–2008)
- (Nicaragua) Ramón Otoniel Olivas (2008–2009, 2026)
- (Spain) Enrique Llena (2010–2014)
- (Colombia) Javier Londoño (2014)
- (Costa Rica) Henry Duarte (2014–2020)
- (Argentina) Juan Vita (2020–2022)
- (Chile) Marco Antonio Figueroa (2022–2025)
- (Argentina) Juan Cruz Real (2026–present)

== Players ==
=== Current squad ===
The following players were named in the squad for the 2026–27 CONCACAF Nations League A matches against Dominican Republic (twice), Curaçao and Costa Rica on 24, 27 September, 1 and 4 October 2026; respectively.

Caps and goals correct as of 27 September 2026, after the match against Curaçao.

No.	Pos.	Player	Date of birth (age)	Caps	Goals	Club
12	GK	Jason Vega	6 November 1995 (age 31)	6	0	(Costa Rican Football Federation) San Carlos
1	GK	Brandon Mayorga	6 January 1998 (age 28)	0	0	(Nicaraguan Football Federation) UNAN Managua
	GK	Adonis Pineda	2 April 1997 (age 29)	3	0	(Costa Rican Football Federation) Puntarenas
4	DF	Marvin Fletes	12 November 1997 (age 29)	40	2	(Nicaraguan Football Federation) Real Estelí
3	DF	Óscar Acevedo	18 March 1997 (age 29)	41	3	(Nicaraguan Football Federation) Real Estelí
19	DF	Juan Luis Pérez	29 June 1999 (age 27)	19	4	(Costa Rican Football Federation) Inter San Carlos
15	DF	Melvin Hernández	26 April 1994 (age 32)	13	0	(Nicaraguan Football Federation) Diriangén
21	DF	Christian Reyes	3 January 1998 (age 28)	22	0	(Nicaraguan Football Federation) Diriangén
6	DF	Emmanuel Gómez	17 May 2000 (age 26)	8	0	(Panamanian Football Federation) UMECIT
5	DF	Justing Cano	2 March 2002 (age 24)	17	0	(Mexican Football Federation) Zacatecas
2	DF	Joab Gutiérrez	31 March 2006 (age 20)	5	0	(Nicaraguan Football Federation) Real Estelí
20	MF	Jonathan Moncada	3 January 1998 (age 28)	24	0	(National Football Federation of Guatemala) Comunicaciones
8	MF	Jacob Montes	20 December 1998 (age 27)	20	4	(United States Soccer Federation) Monterey Bay
18	MF	Amadeus Zamora	19 March 2007 (age 19)	3	0	(German Football Association) Chemnitzer FC
14	MF	Kadeem Cole	12 May 1999 (age 27)	2	0	(United States Soccer Federation) Birmingham Legion
7	MF	Ramón Estrada	30 December 2000 (age 25)	0	0	(Nicaraguan Football Federation) Managua
17	MF	Osmin Salinas	3 February 2004 (age 22)	3	0	(Nicaraguan Football Federation) Real Estelí
9	FW	Jaime Moreno	30 March 1995 (age 31)	52	16	(Football Association of Finland) KuPS
10	FW	Byron Bonilla	30 August 1993 (age 33)	49	8	(Nicaraguan Football Federation) Real Estelí
13	FW	Widman Talavera	12 January 2003 (age 23)	22	3	(Nicaraguan Football Federation) Real Estelí
	FW	Bancy Hernández	27 June 2000 (age 26)	25	4	(Costa Rican Football Federation) Saprissa
7	FW	Jorge García	27 August 1998 (age 28)	16	1	(Nicaraguan Football Federation) Matagalpa
16	FW	Raheem Cole	12 May 1999 (age 27)	4	0	(Costa Rican Football Federation) Puntarenas
11	FW	Efraín Mejía	8 September 2008 (age 18)	3	0	(Nicaraguan Football Federation) CS Sebaco

=== Recent call-ups ===
The following players have been called up for the team in the last twelve months.

Pos.	Player	Date of birth (age)	Caps	Goals	Club	Latest call-up
GK	Alyer López	16 May 1999 (age 27)	4	0	(Nicaragua) Managua	v. Russia, 27 March 2026
GK	Darryl Parker	7 March 1993 (age 33)	0	0	(Nicaragua) Real Estelí	v. Russia, 27 March 2026
GK	César Salandía	13 June 2004 (age 22)	5	0	(Nicaragua) Real Estelí	v. Haiti, 18 November 2025
DF	Josué Quijano	10 March 1991 (age 35)	99	3	(Nicaragua) Real Estelí	v. Russia, 27 March 2026
DF	Leyner Moses	17 October 2005 (age 21)	0	0	(Nicaragua) Real Estelí	v. Russia, 27 March 2026
DF	Evert Martínez	8 March 2002 (age 24)	1	0	(Nicaragua) Real Estelí	v. Russia, 27 March 2026
DF	Anyelo Velásquez	22 December 2004 (age 21)	1	0	(Nicaragua) Diriangén	v. Russia, 27 March 2026
DF	Henry Niño	3 October 1997 (age 29)	25	1	(Nicaragua) Real Estelí	v. Haiti, 18 November 2025
DF	Junior Delgado	24 September 1993 (age 33)	1	0	(Nicaragua) Real Estelí	v. Haiti, 18 November 2025
DF	Steven Cáceres	24 September 1993 (age 33)	1	0	(Nicaragua) Managua	v. Honduras, 13 November 2025
MF	Jefferson Rivera	3 November 1996 (age 30)	0	0	(Costa Rica) Pérez Zeledón	v. Russia, 27 March 2026
MF	Marvin Barahona	5 September 2005 (age 21)	0	0	(Nicaragua) Jalapa	v. Russia, 27 March 2026
MF	Jason Coronel	6 October 1993 (age 33)	32	0	(Nicaragua) Real Estelí	v. Russia, 27 March 2026
MF	Marlon López	2 November 1992 (age 34)	44	0	(Nicaragua) Real Estelí	v. Russia, 27 March 2026
MF	Junior Arteaga	9 December 1999 (age 26)	18	2	(Nicaragua) Diriangén	v. Haiti, 18 November 2025
FW	José Martínez	13 February 2005 (age 21)	0	0	(Nicaragua) Managua	v. Russia, 27 March 2026
FW	Juan Barrera	2 May 1989 (age 37)	93	26	(Nicaragua) Real Estelí	v. Russia, 27 March 2026
FW	Edgar Castillo	21 May 2002 (age 24)	1	0	(Nicaragua) Sébaco	v. Russia, 27 March 2026
FW	Ariagner Smith	13 December 1998 (age 27)	20	7	(Lithuania) FK Panevėžys	Microcycle, March 2026
FW	Edwin Zepeda	22 May 2009 (age 17)	0	0	(Nicaragua) Managua	Microcycle, March 2026
FW	Brayan López	3 June 1990 (age 36)	11	0	(Costa Rica) Puntarenas	v. Haiti, 18 November 2025
FW	Ariel Arauz	30 May 2001 (age 25)	3	0	(Costa Rica) Herediano	v. Haiti, 18 November 2025
^{INJ} Player withdrew from the squad due to an injury.^{PRE} Preliminary squad.^{RET} Player retired from the national team.^{SUS} Player is serving suspension.^{WD} Player withdrew from the squad due to non-injury issue.^{INE} Ineligible player.

== Records ==
As of 9 October 2025
Players in bold are still active with Nicaragua.

=== Most appearances ===
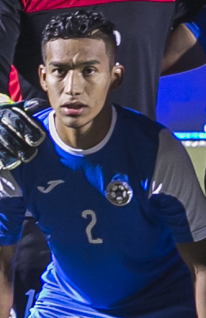
Josué Quijano is Nicaragua's most-capped player with 105 international appearances.

Rank	Player	Caps	Goals	Career
1	**Josué Quijano**	105	3	2011–present
2	**Juan Barrera**	99	26	2009–present
3	Manuel Rosas	60	2	2013–2022
4	David Solórzano	49	1	1999–2014
5	**Jaime Moreno**	48	14	2016–present
6	Carlos Chavarría	44	11	2013–2021
7	**Byron Bonilla**	42	7	2016–present
8	Marlon López	40	0	2014–2020
9	Luis Copete	39	3	2014–2023
9	Denis Espinoza	39	1	2004–2021

=== Top goalscorers ===
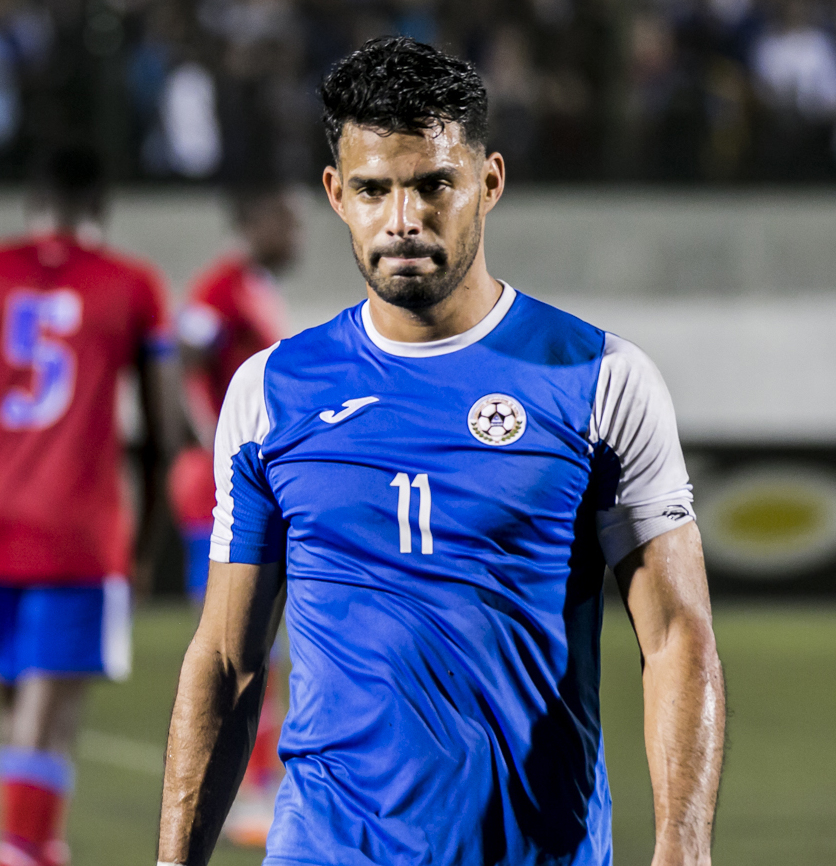
Juan Barrera is Nicaragua's all-time top scorer with 26 goals.

Rank	Player	Goals	Caps	Ratio	Career
1	**Juan Barrera**	26	99	0.26	2009–present
2	**Jaime Moreno**	14	48	0.29	2016–present
3	Emilio Palacios	11	26	0.42	2001–2009
3	Carlos Chavarría	11	44	0.25	2013–2021
5	Raúl Leguías	8	23	0.35	2011–2016
6	**Ariagner Smith**	7	25	0.28	2017–present
6	**Matías Moldskred**	7	34	0.21	2021–present
6	**Byron Bonilla**	7	42	0.17	2016–present
9	Luis Galeano	6	35	0.17	2015–2022
10	**Jacob Montes**	4	14	0.29	2023–present
10	Rudel Calero	4	26	0.15	2001–2011
10	Samuel Wilson	4	29	0.14	2001–2013

== Competitive record ==
=== FIFA World Cup ===
The Nicaragua national football team has never qualified for the World Cup. Their latest attempt was for the 2022 World Cup, when the side failed to advance from the first round.

FIFA World Cup record									Qualification record					
Year	Round	Position	Pld	W	D	L	GF	GA	Pld	W	D	L	GF	GA
(Uruguay) 1930	Not a FIFA member								Not a FIFA member					
(Italy) 1934	Not a FIFA member								Not a FIFA member					
(France) 1938	Not a FIFA member								Not a FIFA member					
(Brazil) 1950	Not a FIFA member								Not a FIFA member					
(Switzerland) 1954	Declined participation								Declined participation					
(Sweden) 1958	Declined participation								Declined participation					
(Chile) 1962	Declined participation								Declined participation					
(England) 1966	Declined participation								Declined participation					
(Mexico) 1970	Declined participation								Declined participation					
(West Germany) 1974	Declined participation								Declined participation					
(Argentina) 1978	Declined participation								Declined participation					
(Spain) 1982	Declined participation								Declined participation					
(Mexico) 1986	Declined participation								Declined participation					
(Italy) 1990	Declined participation								Declined participation					
(United States) 1994	Did not qualify								2	0	0	2	1	10
(France) 1998	Did not qualify								2	0	0	2	1	3
(South Korea) (Japan) 2002	Did not qualify								4	0	0	4	0	10
(Germany) 2006	Did not qualify								2	0	1	1	3	6
(South Africa) 2010	Did not qualify								2	0	0	2	0	3
(Brazil) 2014	Did not qualify								4	2	0	2	5	7
(Russia) 2018	Did not qualify								6	5	0	1	15	5
(Qatar) 2022	Did not qualify								3	2	0	1	10	1
(Canada) (Mexico) (United States) 2026	Did not qualify								10	4	1	5	13	16
(Morocco) (Portugal) (Spain) 2030	To be determined								To be determined					
(Saudi Arabia) 2034	To be determined								To be determined					
Total	–	0/19	–	–	–	–	–	–	35	13	2	20	48	61

=== CONCACAF Gold Cup ===
CONCACAF Championship & Gold Cup record										Qualification record					
Year	Round	Position	Pld	W	D*	L	GF	GA	Squad	Pld	W	D	L	GF	GA
(El Salvador) 1963	Group stage	8th	4	0	0	4	2	15	Squad	Qualified automatically					
(Guatemala) 1965	Did not qualify									2	1	0	1	2	4
(Honduras) 1967	Sixth place	6th	5	0	1	4	3	12	Squad	2	1	0	1	4	4
(Costa Rica) 1969	Did not enter									Did not enter					
(Trinidad and Tobago) 1971	Did not qualify									2	0	0	2	2	4
(Haiti) 1973	Did not enter									Did not enter					
(Mexico) 1977	Did not enter									Did not enter					
(Honduras) 1981	Did not enter									Did not enter					
1985	Did not enter									Did not enter					
1989	Did not enter									Did not enter					
(United States) 1991	Did not qualify									2	0	0	2	2	5
(Mexico) (United States) 1993	Did not qualify									2	0	0	2	0	8
(United States) 1996	Did not qualify									2	0	0	2	0	7
(United States) 1998	Did not qualify									2	0	0	2	2	11
(United States) 2000	Did not qualify									2	0	0	2	0	2
(United States) 2002	Did not qualify									3	0	0	3	2	19
(Mexico) (United States) 2003	Did not qualify									5	1	0	4	1	11
(United States) 2005	Did not qualify									3	1	0	2	2	9
(United States) 2007	Did not qualify									4	1	0	3	6	14
(United States) 2009	Group stage	11th	3	0	0	3	0	8	Squad	4	1	2	1	5	6
(United States) 2011	Did not qualify									4	0	1	3	2	7
(United States) 2013	Did not qualify									3	0	1	2	2	5
(Canada) (United States) 2015	Did not qualify									3	0	0	3	0	6
(United States) 2017	Group stage	10th	3	0	0	3	1	7	Squad	7	2	1	4	9	9
(Costa Rica) (Jamaica) (United States) 2019	Group stage	15th	3	0	0	3	0	8	Squad	4	3	0	1	9	2
(United States) 2021	Did not qualify									6	2	1	3	9	11
(Canada) (United States) 2023	Disqualified									6	4	2	0	15	5
(Canada) (United States) 2025	Did not qualify									6	2	1	3	5	7
2027	To be determined									To be determined					
Total	Sixth place	5/28	18	0	1	17	6	50	—	74	19	9	46	79	154

=== CONCACAF Nations League ===
CONCACAF Nations League record
League										Finals								
Season	Division	Group	Pld	W	D	L	GF	GA	P/R	Year	Result	Pld	W	D	L	GF	GA	Squad
2019–20	B	D	6	2	1	3	9	11	Same position	(United States) 2021	Ineligible							
2022–23	B	C	6	4	2	0	15	5	Same position	(United States) 2023	Ineligible							
2023–24	B	B	6	5	1	0	17	1	▲	(United States) 2024	Ineligible							
2024–25	A	B	4	2	1	1	5	5	Same position	(United States) 2025	Did not qualify							
2026–27	A	A	4	0	0	4	4	14	▼	(United States) 2027	Did not qualify							
Total	—	—	26	13	5	8	50	36	—	Total	0 Titles	—	—	—	—	—	—	—

=== Copa Centroamericana ===
Copa Centroamericana record
Year	Round	Position	Pld	W	D	L	GF	GA
(Costa Rica) 1991	Preliminary round	5th	2	0	0	2	2	5
(Honduras) 1993	Preliminary round	5th	2	0	0	2	0	8
(El Salvador) 1995	Preliminary round	7th	2	0	0	2	0	7
(Guatemala) 1997	First round	6th	2	0	0	2	2	11
(Costa Rica) 1999	First round	5th	2	0	0	2	0	2
(Honduras) 2001	First round	7th	3	0	0	3	2	19
(Panama) 2003	Sixth place	6th	5	1	0	4	1	11
(Guatemala) 2005	Fifth place	5th	3	1	0	2	2	9
(El Salvador) 2007	Sixth place	6th	4	1	0	3	6	14
(Honduras) 2009	Fifth place	5th	4	1	2	1	5	6
(Panama) 2011	Sixth place	6th	4	0	1	3	2	7
(Costa Rica) 2013	Seventh place	7th	3	0	1	2	2	5
(United States) 2014	Sixth place	6th	3	0	0	3	0	6
(Panama) 2017	Fifth place	5th	5	1	1	3	5	6
Total	Fifth place	14/14	44	5	5	34	29	116

=== CCCF Championship ===
CCCF Championship record
Year	Round	Position	Pld	W	D	L	GF	GA
(Costa Rica) 1941	Fifth place	5th	4	0	0	4	5	29
(El Salvador) 1943	Fourth place	4th	6	0	0	6	7	39
(Costa Rica) 1946	Sixth place	6th	5	1	0	4	5	31
(Guatemala) 1948	Did not enter							
(Panama) 1951	Third place	3rd	4	0	0	4	4	22
(Costa Rica) 1953	Sixth place	6th	6	1	0	5	4	18
(Honduras) 1955	Did not enter							
(Netherlands Antilles) 1957	Did not enter							
(Cuba) 1960	Did not enter							
(Costa Rica) 1961	Ninth place	9th	3	0	0	3	3	18
Total	Third place	6/10	28	2	0	26	28	157

=== Pan American Games ===
Pan American Games record
Year	Round	Position	Pld	W	D	L	GF	GA
(Argentina) 1951	Did not enter							
(Mexico) 1955	Did not enter							
(United States) 1959	Did not enter							
(Brazil) 1963	Did not enter							
(Canada) 1967	Did not enter							
(Colombia) 1971	Did not enter							
(Mexico) 1975	Preliminary round	13th	3	0	0	3	2	23
(Puerto Rico) 1979	Did not enter							
(Venezuela) 1983	Did not enter							
(United States) 1987	Did not enter							
(Cuba) 1991	Preliminary round	8th	3	0	0	3	1	20
(Argentina) 1995	Did not qualify							
Since 1999	Youth teams participated							
Total	Preliminary round	2/12	6	0	0	6	3	43

=== Central American and Caribbean Games ===
Central American and Caribbean Games record
Year	Round	Position	Pld	W	D	L	GF	GA
(Cuba) 1930	Did not qualify							
(El Salvador) 1935	Did not qualify							
(Panama) 1938	Did not qualify							
(Colombia) 1946	Did not qualify							
(Guatemala) 1950	Group stage	8th	3	0	0	3	4	19
(Mexico) 1954	Did not qualify							
(Venezuela) 1959	Did not qualify							
(Jamaica) 1962	Did not qualify							
(Puerto Rico) 1966	Did not qualify							
(Panama) 1970	Did not qualify							
(Dominican Republic) 1974	Did not qualify							
(Colombia) 1978	Did not qualify							
(Cuba) 1982	Group stage	7th	3	0	1	2	2	6
(Dominican Republic) 1986	Did not qualify							
Since 1990	Youth teams participated							
Total	Group stage	2/14	6	0	1	5	6	25

== Head-to-head record ==
As of 17 November 2026.

Positive Record Neutral Record Negative Record

Opponents	Pld	W	D	L	GF	GA	GD
Anguilla	3	3	0	0	14	0	+14
Argentina	1	0	0	1	1	5	−4
Bahamas	2	2	0	0	6	0	+6
Barbados	4	3	0	1	10	2	+8
Belize	14	6	4	4	24	14	+10
Bermuda	5	2	0	3	5	7	−2
Bolivia	3	0	1	2	4	6	−2
Canada	1	1	0	0	3	1	+2
Cayman Islands	1	1	0	0	1	0	+1
Colombia	1	0	0	1	2	7	−5
Costa Rica	22	1	2	19	12	80	−68
Cuba	15	4	4	7	17	26	−9
Curaçao (Note: Includes matches against the Netherlands Antilles.)	9	0	1	8	4	40	−36
Dominica	4	4	0	0	10	1	+9
Dominican Republic	7	1	1	5	6	11	−5
El Salvador	31	1	3	27	21	120	−99
French Guiana	2	2	0	0	4	2	+2
Ghana	1	0	0	1	0	1	−1
Guadeloupe	3	0	0	3	0	4	−4
Guatemala	28	2	5	21	18	74	−56
Guyana	1	1	0	0	1	0	+1
Haiti	11	1	2	8	9	21	−12
Honduras	27	2	3	22	18	82	−64
Iran	1	0	0	1	0	1	−1
Jamaica	3	1	0	2	3	6	−3
Martinique	2	0	0	2	0	4	−4
Mexico	3	0	0	3	1	10	−9
Montserrat	5	5	0	0	14	2	+12
Panama	29	5	1	23	26	82	−56
Paraguay	2	0	0	2	0	6	−6
Peru	1	0	0	1	0	2	−2
Puerto Rico	6	3	2	1	10	7	+3
Qatar	1	0	0	1	1	2	−1
Russia	1	0	0	1	1	3	−2
Saint Kitts and Nevis	2	0	2	0	0	0	0
Saint Vincent and the Grenadines	7	2	3	2	12	11	+1
South Africa	1	0	1	0	0	0	0
Suriname	5	2	0	3	6	11	−5
Trinidad and Tobago	7	2	2	3	7	12	−5
Turks and Caicos Islands	1	1	0	0	7	0	+7
United States	1	0	0	1	0	3	−3
Uruguay	1	0	0	1	1	4	−3
Venezuela	1	0	1	0	1	1	0
Total (43)	276	58	38	180	279	671	−392

== Honours ==
=== Subcontinental ===
- CCCF Championship (Note: Official competition organized by CCCF, the former subcontinental confederation affiliated with FIFA as the governing body of football in the Central American and Caribbean Zones (1938–1961), and a direct predecessor of CONCACAF.)
  - (bronze) Third place (1): 1951

== See also ==
- Nicaragua national under-20 football team
- List of football clubs in Nicaragua
