= Erick Puerto =

Honduran footballer (born 2001)

Personal information
- Full name: Erick Omar Puerto Murillo
- Date of birth: 28 October 2001 (age 25)
- Place of birth: Choloma, Honduras
- Height: 1.82 m (6 ft 0 in)
- Position: Forward

Team information
- Current team: BATE Borisov (on loan from Platense)
- Number: 37

Youth career
- 2019–2022: Choloma

Senior career*
Years	Team	Apps	(Gls)
2022	Choloma		
2023–	Platense	41	(25)
2026–	→ BATE Borisov (loan)	0	(0)

International career^{‡}
2026–	Honduras	1	(0)
- * Club domestic league appearances and goals as of 06:11, 28 June 2026 (UTC) ‡ National team caps and goals as of 03:24 , 2 April 2026 (UTC)

Erick Omar Puerto Murillo (born 28 October 2001), nicknamed Yio, is a Honduran professional footballer who plays as a forward for Belarusian Premier League club BATE Borisov, on loan from Liga Nacional club Platense, and the Honduras national team.

== Club career ==
Puerto started his career with Choloma, where he spent three years from 2019 until 2022. He received his first professional first-team contract ahead of the 2022 Clausura tournament of the Liga de Ascenso, the second tier of Honduran football. In 2023, he transferred to Platense, with whom he achieved promotion to the Liga Nacional in 2025. He made his debut in the first division on 27 July 2025, in a 2–1 home victory over Real España, scoring his side's first. In his debut season, Puerto finished with a total of 25 goals in 41 appearances across both Apertura and Clausura tournaments, drawing interest from regional giants Motagua and Comunicaciones, and as well as MLS Next Pro club Ventura County FC.

On 30 June 2026, Belarusian Premier League club BATE Borisov announced the signing of Puerto from Platense on a six-month loan deal with an option to buy. He made his debut the following 7 July in a 1–1 draw against Elbasani, in the first leg of the UEFA Conference League first qualifying round.

== International career ==
Puerto received his first call up to the Honduras national team for the final two matches of the 2026 World Cup qualifiers against Nicaragua and Costa Rica in November 2025. He made his international debut against Peru in a friendly match on 31 March 2026, coming on as a substitute and replacing Jorge Benguché in the 76th minute.

=== International goals ===
As of 2 October 2026

Goal	Date	Venue	Opponent	Score	Result	Competition
1.	2 October 2026	Stade Pierre-Aliker, Fort-de-France, Martinque	Martinique	1–0	1–2	2026–27 CONCACAF Nations League A
