= Amadeus Zamora =

Nicaraguan footballer

Personal information
- Full name: Amadeus Josef Zamora González
- Date of birth: 19 March 2007 (age 19)
- Place of birth: Bautzen, Germany
- Height: 1.78 m (5 ft 10 in)
- Position: Midfielder

Team information
- Current team: Chemnitzer FC
- Number: 13

Youth career
- –2018: Traktor Malschwitz
- 2018–2022: Budissa Bautzen
- 2022–2026: Chemnitzer FC

Senior career*
Years	Team	Apps	(Gls)
2026–	Chemnitzer FC	3	(1)

International career^{‡}
2026–	Nicaragua	3	(0)
- * Club domestic league appearances and goals as of 16:08, 28 September 2026 (UTC) ‡ National team caps and goals as of 16:08, 28 September 2026 (UTC)

Amadeus Josef Zamora González (born 19 March 2007) is a professional footballer who currently plays for Chemnitzer FC. Born in Germany, he plays for the Nicaragua national team.

== Club career ==
Zamora began his career with Traktor Malschwitz. In 2018, he was invited to attend a talent identification camp at the German Football Association Talent Center in his home town following his performances with the club in the district youth cup. He later joined Budissa Bautzen before joining the youth academy of Chemnitzer FC in 2022. Prior to joining Chemnitzer FC, the player had been linked to Dynamo Dresden, but a move did not materialize. Zamora signed a professional contract on 17 June 2026 and was promoted to Chemnitzer's senior team in the Regionalliga Nordost. Two days later, he scored two goals in an 3–1 friendly win over a selection from Vogtland. He scored his first senior league goal after just nineteen minutes of playing time, the game-winner in a 3–1 victory over Chemie Leipzig on 20 September.

== International career ==
Zamora was born in Bautzen, Germany to a German mother and Nicaraguan father. He would visit Nicaragua often as a child to visit his family that still lives there. In January 2026, he was called up to the Nicaragua national under-20 team for the first time for 2026 CONCACAF U-20 Championship qualifying the following month. He received his first senior call-up in May of that year for friendlies against South Africa and Paraguay. Zamora made his senior debut on 29 May in the match against South Africa. He played fifty-four combined minutes against the two 2026 FIFA World Cup-bound nations. He was then called up to the squad again in September 2026 for 2026–27 CONCACAF Nations League A against the Dominican Republic and Curaçao. These matches marked his senior competitive and home debuts for the team.

=== International career statistics ===
As of match played 27 September 2026

Nicaragua national team
2026	3	0
Total	3	0
