= Ján Fülöp =

Slovak association football manager

Jan Fulop
Personal information
- Date of birth: 1949 (age 76–77)
- Place of birth: Nitrianske Hrnčiarovce, Slovakia

Managerial career
- Years: Team
- 1982–1983: Buffalos do Tonos Managua
- 1984–1986: Nicaragua
- 1987–1989: Plastika Nitra (Juniors)
- 1990–1995: Plastika Nitra (Vice-President)

Jan Fulop (born 1949) is a Slovak football manager who last worked as head coach of the Nicaragua national football team.

== Career ==
Fulop started his managerial career with Buffalos do Tonos Managua. In 1985, he was appointed head coach of the Nicaragua national football team, a position he held until 1986.
