= Lucas Bretón =

Dominican Republic footballer (born 2006)

Personal information
- Full name: Lucas Bretón Salcedo
- Date of birth: 20 November 2006 (age 19)
- Place of birth: Dominican Republic
- Height: 1.64 m (5 ft 5 in)
- Position: Midfielder

Team information
- Current team: Málaga B
- Number: 21

Youth career
- –2021: Cibao

Senior career*
Years	Team	Apps	(Gls)
2022–2024	Cibao	44	(2)
2025–	Málaga B	17	(0)

International career^{‡}
2023	Dominican Republic U17	1	(0)
2024–	Dominican Republic U20	3	(0)
2026–	Dominican Republic U23	2	(1)
2024–	Dominican Republic	17	(1)
- * Club domestic league appearances and goals as of 13 October 2026 ‡ National team caps and goals as of 4 August 2026

Lucas Bretón Salcedo (born 20 November 2006) is a Dominican footballer who plays as a midfielder for Tercera Federación – Group 9 club Atlético Malagueño and the Dominican Republic national team.

== International career ==
Bretón made his senior debut for the Dominican Republic national team on 26 March 2024, in a friendly against Peru, under the guidance of head coach Marcelo Neveleff.

He was also part of the U17, U20 and U23 teams, making notable appearances in the CONCACAF youth championships.

== Career statistics ==
=== Club ===
Appearances and goals by club, season and competition
Club	Season	League			Cup		Other		Total	
Club	Season	Division	Apps	Goals	Apps	Goals	Apps	Goals	Apps	Goals
Cibao	2022	Liga Dominicana de Fútbol	7	0	—		0	0	7	0
Cibao	2023	Liga Dominicana de Fútbol	16	1	—		2	0	18	1
Cibao	2024	Liga Dominicana de Fútbol	21	1	—		5	0	26	1
Cibao	Total		44	2	0	0	7	0	51	2
Atlético Malagueño	2025-26	Segunda Federación	13	0	0	0	0	0	13	0
Atlético Malagueño	2026-27	Tercera Federación	4	0	0	0	0	0	4	0
Atlético Malagueño	Total		17	0	0	0	0	0	17	0
Career total			57	2	0	0	7	0	64	2

=== International statistics ===
Appearances and goals by national team and year
National team	Year	Apps	Goals
Dominican Republic	2024	6	0
Dominican Republic	2025	6	0
Dominican Republic	2026	5	1
Total		17	1

Scores and results list Nicaragua's goal tally first, score column indicates score after each Moreno goal.

List of international goals scored by Jaime Moreno
No.	Date	Venue	Opponent	Score	Result	Competition
1	4 October 2026	Nicaragua National Football Stadium, Managua, Nicaragua	Nicaragua	2–1	2–1	2026–27 CONCACAF Nations League A

== Achievements ==
=== Club ===
- Liga Dominicana de Fútbol: 2023, 2024
- Runner-up: 2024 CONCACAF Caribbean Cup

=== International ===
- Participated in CONCACAF U20 Championship qualification: 2023
