= Widman Talavera =

Nicaraguan footballer (born 2003)

Personal information
- Full name: Widman Esmir Talavera Flores
- Date of birth: 12 January 2003 (age 23)
- Place of birth: Estelí, Nicaragua
- Height: 1.67 m (5 ft 6 in)
- Position: Left winger

Team information
- Current team: Real Estelí FC
- Number: 12

Senior career*
Years	Team	Apps	(Gls)
2019–	Real Estelí FC	155	(26)

International career^{‡}
2019–2022	Nicaragua U17	4	(2)
2022	Nicaragua U20	1	(0)
2022–	Nicaragua	26	(4)
- * Club domestic league appearances and goals as of 13 February 2026 ‡ National team caps and goals as of 17 November 2026

Widman Esmir Talavera Flores (born 12 January 2003) is a Nicaraguan professional footballer who plays as a winger for Real Estelí FC and the Nicaragua national football team.

== Early life ==
Talavera was born in the city of Estelí, Nicaragua. He spent his youth career at the local side Real Estelí FC.

== Club career ==
Talavera has spent his entire professional career at Real Estelí FC. He has since recorded over 100 appearances for the club, scoring 53 goals. During his tenure at Estelí, Talavera won the Liga Primera de Nicaragua multiple times, as well as a runners-up medal in the 2023 CONCACAF Central American Cup.

== International career ==
Talavera has recorded 19 appearances for the Nicaragua men's national team. He scored the winning goal in stoppage time against the French Guiana national football team during the 2024–25 CONCACAF Nations League.

=== International goals ===
Scores and results list Nicaragua's goal tally first, score column indicates score after each Talavera goal.

List of international goals scored by Widman Talavera
No.	Date	Venue	Opponent	Score	Result	Competition
1	10 June 2023	Estadio Universidad Latina, Penonomé, Panama	Panama	1–0	2–3	Friendly
2	6 September 2024	Stade Municipal Dr. Edmard Lama, Remire-Montjoly, French Guiana	French Guiana	1–0	1–0	2024–25 CONCACAF Nations League
3	10 September 2024	Estadio Antonio Maceo, Santiago de Cuba, Cuba	Cuba	1–1	1–1	2024–25 CONCACAF Nations League]
4	17 November 2026	Estadio Nacional, Managua, Nicaragua	Montserrat	1–0	2–0	2026–27 CONCACAF Nations League
