= Kenyel Michel =

Costa Rican footballer (born 2004)

Personal information
- Full name: Kenyel Jaheim Michel Vargas
- Date of birth: 17 September 2004 (age 22)
- Place of birth: Limón Province, Costa Rica
- Height: 1.70 m (5 ft 7 in)
- Position: Winger

Team information
- Current team: Alajuelense
- Number: 99

Youth career
- Alajuelense

Senior career*
Years	Team	Apps	(Gls)
2022–2025	Alajuelense	8	(0)
2024–2025	→ Cartaginés (loan)	27	(3)
2025–2026	Minnesota United	0	(0)
2025	→ Alajuelense (loan)	17	(5)
2026	Minnesota United 2	8	(0)
2026–	Alajuelense	9	(5)

International career^{‡}
2026–	Costa Rica	4	(1)
- * Club domestic league appearances and goals as of 23:21, 20 September 2026 (UTC) ‡ National team caps and goals as of 23:13, 4 October 2026 (UTC)

Kenyel Jaheim Michel Vargas (born 17 September 2004) is a Costa Rican footballer who plays as a winger for Alajuelense and the Costa Rica national team.

== Early life ==
Michel was born on 17 September 2004. Born in Limón Province, Costa Rica, he is a native of the province.

== Club career ==
As a youth player, Michel joined the youth academy of Costa Rican side Alajuelense and was promoted to the club's senior team in 2022, where he made eight league appearances and scored zero goals and helped them win the 2023 CONCACAF Central American Cup.

During September 2024, he was sent on loan to Costa Rican side Cartaginés, where he made twenty-seven league appearances and scored three goals. Following his stint there, he signed for American side Minnesota United in 2025. Subsequently, he returned on loan to Costa Rican side Alajuelense the same year.

== International career ==
On 24 September 2026, Michel made his debut for the Costa Rica national team in a 2026–27 CONCACAF Nations League A game against Curaçao.

== Style of play ==
Michel plays as a winger. Costa Rican newspaper La Teja wrote in 2025 that "his mischievousness, speed, and joy when playing are characteristics that make him stand out, which are classic of the area he comes from, his beloved Limón".

== Career statistics ==
=== International ===
As of match played 4 October 2026

Appearances and goals by national team and year
National team	Year	Apps	Goals
Costa Rica	2026	4	1
Total		4	1

Scores and results list Costa Rica's goal tally first, score column indicates score after each Michel goal.

List of international goals scored by Kenyel Michel
No.	Date	Venue	Opponent	Score	Result	Competition
1	1 October 2026	Nicaragua National Football Stadium, Managua, Nicaragua	Nicaragua	3–0	3–0	2026–27 CONCACAF Nations League A
