= Belony Dumas =

French footballer (born 1989)

Personal information
- Date of birth: 18 July 1989 (age 37)
- Place of birth: Oullins, France
- Height: 1.83 m (6 ft 0 in)
- Position: Defender

Team information
- Current team: Fréjus Saint-Raphaël
- Number: 19

Senior career*
Years	Team	Apps	(Gls)
2012–2013	Mulhouse	33	(4)
2013–2015	Boulogne	43	(1)
2015–2023	Fréjus Saint-Raphaël	146	(3)
2023–2025	Saint-Priest	43	(1)
2025–	Fréjus Saint-Raphaël	11	(2)

International career^{‡}
2019–	Saint Martin	23	(1)
- * Club domestic league appearances and goals as of 13 December 2025 ‡ National team caps and goals as of 17 November 2026

Belony Dumas (born 18 July 1989) is a professional footballer who plays as a defender for Championnat National 1 club Fréjus Saint-Raphaël. Born in metropolitan France, he plays for the Saint Martin national team.

== Early life ==
Dumas was born in Oullins, France and is of Haitian descent.

== Club career ==
Dumas played in the first round of the 2013–14 Coupe de la Ligue for Boulogne against Créteil on 6 August 2013, missing the first penalty in the shootout that Boulogne eventually lost.

== International career ==
Dumas made his debut for Saint Martin national team on 12 October 2019 in a CONCACAF Nations League game against the Cayman Islands, which ended in 3–0 victory for Saint Martin.

=== International goals ===
As of match played 17 November 2026

Saint Martin score listed first, score column indicates score after each Dumas goal.

List of international goals scored by Belony Dumas
No.	Date	Venue	Opponent	Score	Result	Competition
1	17 November 2026	Estadio Jorge "El Mágico" González, San Salvador, El Salvador	El Salvador	1–1	1–3	2026–27 CONCACAF Nations League Play-in
