= Ashley Boatswain =

Montserratian footballer (born 2005)

Personal information
- Full name: Ashley Frank Boatswain
- Date of birth: 19 April 2005 (age 21)
- Place of birth: Colchester, England
- Position: Forward

Team information
- Current team: Gateshead
- Number: 29

Youth career
- –2022: Ipswich Town

Senior career*
Years	Team	Apps	(Gls)
2022–2026	Ipswich Town	0	(0)
2022–2023	→ Bury Town (loan)	2	(1)
2024	→ Leiston (loan)	13	(4)
2025	→ AFC Fylde (loan)	18	(1)
2025–2026	→ Woking (loan)	13	(2)
2026–	Gateshead	25	(3)

International career^{‡}
2024–	Montserrat	13	(5)
- * Club domestic league appearances and goals as of 09:52, 14 November 2026 (UTC) ‡ National team caps and goals as of 09:52, 14 November 2026 (UTC)

Ashley Frank Boatswain (born 19 April 2005) is a professional footballer who plays as a forward for Gateshead. Born in England, he plays for the Montserrat national team.

== Club career ==
Boatswain was born in Colchester. He played in the academy at Ipswich Town at under-18 and under-21 level, playing senior football for the first time when he was loaned out to Isthmian League club Bury Town in December 2022. In February 2024, he was loaned to Southern Football League club Leiston. In January 2025, he joined AFC Fylde on loan until the end of the season.

On 9 October 2025, Boatswain returned to the National League to join Woking on loan until January 2026. Although his loan had been extended in January to run until the end of the season, it was brought to an early end on 6 February 2026. He returned to Ipswich Town having featured 19 times and found the net on five occasions. Ashley signed for Gateshead on an 18 month deal on Feb 25th 2026 till 26/27 season

== International career ==
Boatswain was called up by Montserrat in September 2024, making his debut against El Salvador on 5 September. On 14 November 2024, he scored his first international goal against Saint Vincent and the Grenadines.

== Career statistics ==
=== Club ===
As of 1 February 2026

Appearances and goals by club, season and competition
Club	Season	League			FA Cup		EFL Cup		Other		Total	
Club	Season	Division	Apps	Goals	Apps	Goals	Apps	Goals	Apps	Goals	Apps	Goals
Ipswich Town	2022–23	League One	0	0	0	0	0	0	0	0	0	0
Ipswich Town	2023–24	Championship	0	0	0	0	0	0	—		0	0
Ipswich Town	2024–25	Premier League	0	0	0	0	0	0	—		0	0
Ipswich Town	2025–26	Championship	0	0	0	0	0	0	—		0	0
Ipswich Town	Total		0	0	0	0	0	0	0	0	0	0
Bury Town (loan)	2022–23	Isthmian League North Division	2	1	—		—		—		2	1
Leiston (loan)	2023–24	Southern League Premier Division Central	13	4	—		—		—		13	4
AFC Fylde (loan)	2024–25	National League	18	1	—		—		—		18	1
Woking (loan)	2025–26	National League	13	2	2	1	—		4 (Note: Three appearances in FA Trophy, one appearance in National League Cup)	2	19	5
Career total			44	8	2	1	0	0	4	2	50	11

=== International ===
As of match played 13 November 2026

Appearances and goals by national team and year
National team	Year	Apps	Goals
Montserrat	2024	6	1
Montserrat	2025	2	1
Montserrat	2026	5	3
Total		13	5

=== International goals ===
Scores and results list Montserrat's goal tally first.

No.	Date	Venue	Opponent	Score	Result	Competition
1.	14 November 2024	Estadio Cuscatlán, San Salvador, El Salvador	Saint Vincent and the Grenadines	1–2	1–2	2024–25 CONCACAF Nations League B
2.	23 September 2026	TCIFA National Academy, Providenciales, Turks and Caicos Islands	Turks and Caicos Islands	1–0	2–0	2026–27 CONCACAF Nations League C
3.	23 September 2026	TCIFA National Academy, Providenciales, Turks and Caicos Islands	Turks and Caicos Islands	2–0	2–0	2026–27 CONCACAF Nations League C
4.	6 October 2026	TCIFA National Academy, Providenciales, Turks and Caicos Islands	Turks and Caicos Islands	4–1	4–1	2026–27 CONCACAF Nations League C
5.	13 November 2026	Estadio Cibao FC, Santiago de los Caballeros, Dominican Republic	Nicaragua	1–0	1–2	2026–27 CONCACAF Nations League Play-in
