= Heinz Mörschel =

Dominican footballer (born 1997)

Personal information
- Full name: Heinz Robert Mörschel Moreno
- Date of birth: 24 August 1997 (age 29)
- Place of birth: Santo Domingo, Dominican Republic
- Height: 1.90 m (6 ft 3 in)
- Position: Midfielder

Team information
- Current team: Vizela
- Number: 24

Youth career
- –2012: FSV Frankfurt
- 2012–2016: Mainz 05

Senior career*
Years	Team	Apps	(Gls)
2016–2018	Mainz 05 II	41	(8)
2018–2019	Holstein Kiel	8	(1)
2019–2020	Preußen Münster	34	(8)
2020–2021	KFC Uerdingen 05	16	(3)
2021–2022	Dynamo Dresden	44	(10)
2023–2024	Újpest	41	(8)
2024–	Vizela	66	(24)

International career^{‡}
2014	Germany U18	3	(1)
2015	Germany U19	1	(1)
2024	Dominican Republic Olympic (O.P.)	3	(0)
2023–	Dominican Republic	27	(12)
- * Club domestic league appearances and goals as of 4 November 2026 ‡ National team caps and goals as of 5 October 2026

Heinz Robert Mörschel Moreno (born 24 August 1997) is a Dominican professional footballer who plays as a midfielder for Liga Portugal 2 club Vizela and the Dominican Republic national team.

== Club career ==
Mörschel is a youth exponent from 1. FSV Mainz 05. He made his 3. Liga debut with Mainz 05 II on 10 August 2016 against VfL Osnabrück.

In June 2018, Mörschel joined 2. Bundesliga side Holstein Kiel on a two-year contract. He then joined SC Preußen Münster on 1 July 2019.

In August 2020, he joined KFC Uerdingen 05 on a contract until June 2022. However, he left Uerdingen prematurely and joined Dynamo Dresden in January 2021.

== International career ==
Mörschel was born in the Dominican Republic to a German father and Dominican mother, and moved to Germany at 8 months old, and holds dual citizenship. He is a youth international for Germany, having played for the Germany U18s. He was called up to the Dominican Republic national team for a set of 2023–24 CONCACAF Nations League matches in September 2023.

== Career statistics ==
=== Club ===
Appearances and goals by club, season and competition
Club	Season	League			National cup		Continental		Total	
Club	Season	Division	Apps	Goals	Apps	Goals	Apps	Goals	Apps	Goals
Mainz 05 II	2016-17	3. Liga	19	1	0	0	0	0	19	1
Mainz 05 II	2017-18	Regionalliga	22	7	0	0	0	0	22	7
Mainz 05 II	Total		41	8	0	0	0	0	41	8
Holstein	2018-19	2. Bundesliga	8	1	0	0	0	0	8	1
SC Preußen Münster	2019-20	3. Liga	34	8	1	0	0	0	35	8
KFC Uerdingen 05	2020-21	3. Liga	16	4	0	0	0	0	16	4
Dynamo Dresden	2020-21	3. Liga	18	7	0	0	0	0	18	7
Dynamo Dresden	2021-22	2. Bundesliga	26	3	2	0	0	0	28	3
Dynamo Dresden	Total		44	10	2	0	0	0	46	10
Újpest FC	2022-23	NB I	10	2	0	0	0	0	10	2
Újpest FC	2023-24	NB I	31	6	1	0	0	0	32	6
Újpest FC	Total		41	8	1	0	0	0	42	8
F.C. Vizela	2024-25	Liga Portugal 2	31	11	2	1	0	0	33	12
F.C. Vizela	2025-26	Liga Portugal 2	29	13	1	0	0	0	30	13
F.C. Vizela	2026-27	Liga Portugal 2	6	0	2	1	0	0	8	1
F.C. Vizela	Total		66	24	5	2	0	0	71	26
Career total			250	63	9	2	0	0	259	65

As of match played 4 October 2026

=== International ===
Appearances and goals by national team and year
National team	Year	Apps	Goals	Assists
Dominican Republic Olympoic	2024	3	0	0
Total		3	0	0
Dominican Republic	2023	6	2	0
Dominican Republic	2024	9	5	5
Dominican Republic	2025	8	2	1
Dominican Republic	2026	3	3	0
Total		26	12	6

== International goals ==
No.	Date	Venue	Opponent	Score	Result	Competition
1.	13 October 2023	Wildey Turf, Wildey, Barbados	Barbados	4–0	5–0	2023–24 CONCACAF Nations League
2.	16 October 2023	Estadio Cibao FC, Santiago de los Caballeros, Dominican Republic	Barbados	4–1	5–2	2023–24 CONCACAF Nations League
3.	7 September 2024	ABFA Technical Center, Piggotts, Antigua and Barbuda	Bermuda	2–2	3–2	2024–25 CONCACAF Nations League
4.	15 October 2024	Bermuda National Stadium, Devonshire Parish, Bermuda	Antigua and Barbuda	2–0	5–0	2024–25 CONCACAF Nations League
5.	16 November 2024	Estadio Cibao FC, Santiago de los Caballeros, Dominican Republic	Dominica	2–1	6–1	2024–25 CONCACAF Nations League
6.	16 November 2024	Estadio Cibao FC, Santiago de los Caballeros, Dominican Republic	Dominica	3–1	6–1	2024–25 CONCACAF Nations League
7.	19 November 2024	Estadio Cibao FC, Santiago de los Caballeros, Dominican Republic	Bermuda	4–1	6–1	2024–25 CONCACAF Nations League
8.	6 June 2025	Estadio Cementos Progreso, Guatemala City, Guatemala	Guatemala	2–1	2–4	2026 FIFA World Cup qualification
9.	12 November 2025	Estadio Cibao FC, Santiago de los Caballeros, Dominican Republic	Saint Vincent and the Grenadines	1–0	2–0	2025–26 CONCACAF Series
10.	24 September 2026	Estadio Cibao FC, Santiago de los Caballeros, Dominican Republic	Nicaragua	1–0	3–2	2026–27 CONCACAF Nations League A
11.	27 September 2026	Hasely Crawford Stadium, Port of Spain, Trinidad and Tobago	Trinidad and Tobago	1–1	2–1	2026–27 CONCACAF Nations League A
12.	4 October 2026	Nicaragua National Football Stadium, Managua, Nicaragua	Nicaragua	1–1	2–1	2026–27 CONCACAF Nations League A
