= 2026–27 CONCACAF Nations League A =

Tournament details
- Dates: Group phase: 24 September – 5 October 2026; Quarter-finals: 12–17 November 2026; Nations League Finals: 25–28 March 2027
- Teams: 16
- Relegated: El Salvador; Martinique; Nicaragua; Trinidad and Tobago

Tournament statistics
- Matches played: 32
- Goals scored: 105 (3.28 per match)
- Attendance: 112,071 (3,502 per match)
- Top scorer(s): (Costa Rica) Carlos Mora (Curaçao) Kenji Gorré (Guatemala) Óscar Santis (4 goals each)
- All statistics correct as of 17 November 2026.

The 2026–27 CONCACAF Nations League A is the top division of the 2026–27 edition of the CONCACAF Nations League, the fifth season of the international football competition involving the men's national teams of the 41 member associations of CONCACAF. The initial group stage was held from 24 September to 5 October 2026.

League A will culminate with the Nations League Finals in March 2027 to crown the champions of the CONCACAF Nations League.

This edition of the CONCACAF Nations League A will serve to determine the four teams that qualify directly for the 2027 CONCACAF Gold Cup in the United States. The top four teams will qualify for the final tournament while the remaining League A teams can still qualify via the 2027 CONCACAF Gold Cup qualification tournament.

== Format ==
League A maintains the same format introduced for the 2023–24 season, consisting of a group stage, a quarter-finals round, a play-in round and the finals. The 16 involved teams entered the competition in the group stage or directly into the quarter-finals according to their position in the CONCACAF Rankings (as of 20 July 2026), with the 12 lowest-ranked teams entering the group stage and the top four ranked teams receiving a direct pass to the quarter-finals round.

The group stage consisted of two groups of six teams, with each team playing four matches against opponents of its group (two at home and two away) on a Swiss-system basis. The opponents scheduled in the fixture released by CONCACAF on 24 July 2026 are listed by corresponding pot below:

- Pot 1: home to Pots 2 and 4, away to Pots 2 and 5
- Pot 2: home to Pots 1 and 3, away to Pots 1 and 6
- Pot 3: home to Pots 4 and 6, away to Pots 2 and 4
- Pot 4: home to Pots 3 and 5, away to Pots 1 and 3
- Pot 5: home to Pots 1 and 6, away to Pots 4 and 6
- Pot 6: home to Pots 2 and 5, away to Pots 3 and 5

The top two teams from each group advanced to the quarter-finals, where they joined the four teams that qualified directly to this round. The bottom two teams from each group were relegated to the 2028–29 CONCACAF Nations League B, but also advanced to the play-in round in which they will join four teams from the League C in order to compete to qualify for the 2027 CONCACAF Gold Cup qualification tournament.

The quarter-finals will be played on a two-legged home-and-away basis with the four winners advancing to the Nations League Finals and qualifying directly to the 2027 CONCACAF Gold Cup. The Nations League Finals, consisting of a semi-final round, third place play-off and the final match, will be played in March 2027 at a centralised venue to be announced.

=== 2027 CONCACAF Gold Cup qualification ===
As announced by CONCACAF in February 2026, the 2026–27 CONCACAF Nations League will serve as a qualifier for the 2027 CONCACAF Gold Cup. League A teams will qualify for the 2027 CONCACAF Gold Cup final tournament or the Gold Cup qualification tournament (also called CONCACAF Gold Cup prelims) or advance to the play-in round based on their performance in the group stage and quarter-finals round, as follows:

- The four quarter-finals winners (i.e., the four teams involved in the finals) will qualify directly for the 2027 CONCACAF Gold Cup.
- The four quarter-finals losers will qualify for the 2027 CONCACAF Gold Cup qualification.
- The third and fourth placed teams of each group will also qualify for the 2027 CONCACAF Gold Cup qualification.
- The fifth and sixth placed teams of each group will advance to the play-in round where they will face the top four teams in League C for the last four slots in the 2027 CONCACAF Gold Cup qualification.

== Teams ==
A total of sixteen national teams contest the League A, including the top twelve sides from the 2024–25 season and four promoted from the 2024–25 League B.

=== Team changes ===
The following are the team changes in League A regarding the 2024–25 season:

Incoming
Promoted from
Nations League B
- Curaçao
- Dominican Republic
- El Salvador
- Haiti

Outgoing
Relegated to
Nations League B
- Cuba
- French Guiana
- Guadeloupe
- Guyana

=== Seeding ===
The pots were confirmed on 21 July 2026, with the lowest twelve League A ranked teams, based on the CONCACAF Rankings as of 20 July 2026, being split into six pots of two teams. The top four ranked teams (Mexico, the United States, Canada and Panama) were directly seeded in the quarter-finals.

Pot	Team	Rank	Pts
1	Costa Rica	5	1,624
1	Honduras	6	1,549
2	Jamaica	7	1,515
2	Haiti	8	1,452
3	Guatemala	9	1,436
3	Trinidad and Tobago	10	1,356
4	Curaçao	11	1,335
4	Suriname	12	1,289
5	Martinique	13	1,202
5	Nicaragua	15	1,141
6	El Salvador	16	1,127
6	Dominican Republic	18	1,046

=== Draw ===
The group stage draw was held on 23 July 2026, 19:00 EDT (UTC−4), in Miami, Florida, United States, where the twelve involved teams were drawn into two groups of six. The draw began by randomly selecting a team from Pot 1 and placing them into Group A and then selecting the remaining team from Pot 1 and placing them into Group B. The draw continued with the same procedure done for the remaining pots.

The draw resulted in the following groups:

Group A
Pos	Team
A1	Costa Rica
A2	Haiti
A3	Trinidad and Tobago
A4	Curaçao
A5	Nicaragua
A6	Dominican Republic

Group B
Pos	Team
B1	Honduras
B2	Jamaica
B3	Guatemala
B4	Suriname
B5	Martinique
B6	El Salvador

== Group stage ==
The fixture list was confirmed by CONCACAF on 24 July 2026. All match times are in EDT (UTC−4) as listed by CONCACAF (local times, if different, are in parentheses).

=== Group A ===
Pos	Team	Pld	W	D	L	GF	GA	GD	Pts	Qualification or relegation	(Curaçao)	(Haiti)	(Dominican Republic)	(Costa Rica)	(Trinidad and Tobago)	(Nicaragua)
1	Curaçao	4	3	1	0	12	5	+7	10	Advance to quarter-finals	—	—	—	—	1–0	6–1
2	Haiti	4	3	0	1	9	5	+4	9	Advance to quarter-finals	—	—	—	2–0	3–2	—
3	Dominican Republic	4	3	0	1	8	8	0	9	Qualification for Gold Cup prelims	—	1–4	—	—	—	3–2
4	Costa Rica	4	2	0	2	8	6	+2	6	Qualification for Gold Cup prelims	3–4	2–0	—	—	—	—
5	Trinidad and Tobago (R)	4	0	1	3	4	7	−3	1	Advance to play-in and relegation to League B	1–1	—	1–2	—	—	—
6	Nicaragua (R)	4	0	0	4	4	14	−10	0	Advance to play-in and relegation to League B	—	—	1–2	0–3	—	—

Source: CONCACAF
Rules for classification: Tiebreakers
(R) Relegated
24 September 2026
20:00

Dominican Republic	3–2	Nicaragua
Mörschel 5'; Mariano 15'; Rosario 90+7'	Report	Pérez 40'; Bonilla 84'

Estadio Cibao FC, Santiago de los Caballeros
Attendance: 3,273
Referee: Selvin Brown (Honduras)
24 September 2026
20:00 (19:00 UTC−5)

Haiti	3–2	Trinidad and Tobago
Picault 23'; Metusala 90+1'; Isidor 90+8'	Report	Frederick 31'; L. García 59'

Sabina Park, Kingston (Jamaica) (Note: Haiti played their home group stage matches at Sabina Park in Kingston, Jamaica due to the ongoing Haitian crisis.)
Attendance: 277
Referee: Filip Dujic (Canada)
24 September 2026
22:00 (20:00 UTC−6)

Costa Rica	3–4	Curaçao
Sinclair 3'; Mora 23', 45+1'	Report	Gorré 62', 78'; Chong 66'; Paulina 82'

Estadio Ricardo Saprissa Aymá, Tibás
Attendance: 8,388
Referee: Mario Escobar (Guatemala)

27 September 2026
19:00 (18:00 UTC−5)

Haiti	2–0	Costa Rica
Bellegarde 9'; Calvo 39' (o.g.)	Report

Sabina Park, Kingston (Jamaica)
Attendance: 317
Referee: Iván Barton (El Salvador)
27 September 2026
20:00

Curaçao	6–1	Nicaragua
Comenencia 6'; Gorré 11', 39'; L. Bacuna 19'; J. Bacuna 27'; Locadia 88'	Report	Moreno 62'

Ergilio Hato Stadium, Willemstad
Attendance: 7,485
Referee: Saíd Martínez (Honduras)
27 September 2026
21:00

Trinidad and Tobago	1–2	Dominican Republic
Phillips 37'	Report	Mörschel 42'; Mariano 50'

Hasely Crawford Stadium, Port of Spain
Attendance: 3,361
Referee: Reon Radix (Grenada)

1 October 2026
18:00

Curaçao	1–0	Trinidad and Tobago
J. Bacuna 58'	Report

Ergilio Hato Stadium, Willemstad
Attendance: 7,485
Referee: Oshane Nation (Jamaica)
1 October 2026
20:00

Dominican Republic	1–4	Haiti
Romero 55'	Report	Deedson 9'; Isidor 51', 67'; Fortuné 76'

Estadio Olímpico Félix Sánchez, Santo Domingo
Attendance: 23,703
Referee: Katja Koroleva (United States)
1 October 2026
22:00 (20:00 UTC−6)

Nicaragua	0–3	Costa Rica
	Report	Sinclair 57'; Mora 60'; Michel 90+7'

Estadio Nacional de Fútbol, Managua
Attendance: 14,745
Referee: Walter López (Guatemala)

4 October 2026
18:00

Trinidad and Tobago	1–1	Curaçao
Phillip 39'	Report	Paulina 61'

Hasely Crawford Stadium, Port of Spain
Attendance: 3,977
Referee: Nelson Salgado (Honduras)
4 October 2026
20:00 (18:00 UTC−6)

Costa Rica	2–0	Haiti
Mora 6'; Soto 21'	Report

Estadio Ricardo Saprissa Aymá, Tibás
Attendance: 12,219
Referee: Armando Villarreal (United States)
4 October 2026
22:00 (20:00 UTC−6)

Nicaragua	1–2	Dominican Republic
Moreno 53'	Report	Mörschel 58' (pen.); Bretón 66'

Estadio Nacional de Fútbol, Managua
Attendance: 9,235
Referee: Ismael Cornejo (El Salvador)

=== Group B ===
Pos	Team	Pld	W	D	L	GF	GA	GD	Pts	Qualification or relegation	(Guatemala)	(Jamaica)	(Suriname)	(Honduras)	(Martinique)	(El Salvador)
1	Guatemala	4	2	1	1	9	3	+6	7	Advance to quarter-finals	—	—	1–0	—	—	6–0
2	Jamaica	4	2	1	1	6	4	+2	7	Advance to quarter-finals	3–2	—	—	0–1	—	—
3	Suriname	4	2	1	1	5	4	+1	7	Qualification for Gold Cup prelims	0–0	—	—	—	2–1	—
4	Honduras	4	1	1	2	5	6	−1	4	Qualification for Gold Cup prelims	—	1–1	2–3	—	—	—
5	Martinique (R)	4	1	1	2	5	7	−2	4	Advance to play-in and relegation to League B	—	—	—	2–1	—	1–1
6	El Salvador (R)	4	1	1	2	4	10	−6	4	Advance to play-in and relegation to League B	—	0–2	—	—	3–1	—

Source: CONCACAF
Rules for classification: Tiebreakers
(R) Relegated
25 September 2026
20:00 (19:00 UTC−5)

Jamaica	3–2	Guatemala
Palmer 37'; Burrell 53'; Cephas 90+4'	Report	Santis 2', 67'

Independence Park, Kingston
Attendance: 3,161
Referee: Keylor Herrera (Costa Rica)
25 September 2026
21:00 (19:00 UTC−6)

Honduras	2–3	Suriname
Moncada 20'; Róchez 23'	Report	Lonwijk 18'; Jubitana 39'; Palma 66' (o.g.)

Estadio Nacional Chelato Uclés, Tegucigalpa
Attendance: 8,707
Referee: Fernando Hernández (Mexico)
25 September 2026
23:00 (21:00 UTC−6)

El Salvador	3–1	Martinique
B. Gil 8', 18'; Osorio 29'	Report	Antiste 51' (pen.)

Estadio Jorge "El Mágico" González, San Salvador
Attendance: 6,095
Referee: Pierre-Luc Lauzière (Canada)

28 September 2026
18:00 (19:00 UTC−3)

Suriname	2–1	Martinique
Lonwijk 54'; Kerk 69'	Report	Moltenis 81'

Dr. Ir. Franklin Essed Stadion, Paramaribo
Attendance: 2,852
Referee: Adonis Carrasco (Dominican Republic)
28 September 2026
20:00 (19:00 UTC−5)

Jamaica	0–1	Honduras
	Report	Figueroa 14'

Independence Park, Kingston
Attendance: 3,173
Referee: Juan Gabriel Calderón (Costa Rica)
28 September 2026
22:00 (20:00 UTC−6)

Guatemala	6–0	El Salvador
Lom 8'; Rubin 28'; Fajardo 32', 89', 90+2'; Aparicio 56'	Report

Manuel Felipe Carrera Stadium, Guatemala City
Attendance: 4,826
Referee: Luis Enrique Santander (Mexico)

2 October 2026
18:00 (19:00 UTC−3)

Suriname	0–0	Guatemala
	Report

Dr. Ir. Franklin Essed Stadion, Paramaribo
Attendance: 3,592
Referee: Katia Itzel García (Mexico)
2 October 2026
20:00

Martinique	2–1	Honduras
Varane 40'; Mexique 88'	Report	Puerto 8'

Stade Pierre-Aliker, Fort-de-France
Attendance: 1,325
Referee: Kwinsi Williams (Trinidad and Tobago)
2 October 2026
22:00 (20:00 UTC−6)

El Salvador	0–2	Jamaica
	Report	East 39', 64'

Estadio Cuscatlán, San Salvador
Attendance: 9,306
Referee: Adonai Escobedo (Mexico)

5 October 2026
18:00

Martinique	1–1	El Salvador
Antiste 56'	Report	Valladares 3'

Stade Pierre-Aliker, Fort-de-France
Attendance: 1,170
Referee: Tori Penso (United States)
5 October 2026
20:00 (18:00 UTC−6)

Guatemala	1–0	Suriname
Evans 90+6'	Report

Manuel Felipe Carrera Stadium, Guatemala City
Attendance: 4,826
Referee: Joe Dickerson (United States)
5 October 2026
22:00 (20:00 UTC−6)

Honduras	1–1	Jamaica
Palma 51'	Report	Campbell 27'

Estadio Nacional Chelato Uclés, Tegucigalpa
Attendance: 9,574
Referee: Marco Ortíz (Mexico)

== Quarter-finals ==
The quarter-finals pairings were determined based on the CONCACAF Rankings published on 20 July 2026 for the four pre-seeded teams and the group stage results for the winners and runners-up of each group.

Pre-seeded teams
Pos	Team	Rank (Note: CONCACAF rankings (as of 20 July 2026))	Pts
1	Mexico	1	2,112
2	United States	2	1,833
3	Canada	3	1,799
4	Panama	4	1,685

Group stage winners and runners-up
Rank	Grp	Team	Pld	W	D	L	GF	GA	GD	Pts
1	A	Curaçao	4	3	1	0	12	5	+7	10
2	B	Guatemala	4	2	1	1	9	3	+6	7
3	A	Haiti	4	3	0	1	9	5	+4	9
4	B	Jamaica	4	2	1	1	6	4	+2	7

Source: CONCACAF
Rules for classification: Tiebreakers

The match-ups were as follows:

- Quarter-final 1 (QF1): Fourth ranked pre-seeded team (Panama) vs Best ranked group winner (Curaçao)
- Quarter-final 2 (QF2): Third ranked pre-seeded team (Canada) vs Next ranked group winner (Guatemala)
- Quarter-final 3 (QF3): Second ranked pre-seeded team (United States) vs Best ranked group runner-up (Haiti)
- Quarter-final 4 (QF4): First ranked pre-seeded team (Mexico) vs Next ranked group runner-up (Jamaica)

Each tie was played on a home-and-away two-legged basis, with the order of legs being decided by the four pre-seeded teams that received a direct bye to the quarter-finals (Canada, Mexico, Panama and the United States). If the aggregate score were level at the end of the second leg, the away goals rule was applied. If away goals were also equal, then 30 minutes of extra time would be played without taking into account the away goals rule during this time. If still tied after extra time, the tie would be decided by a penalty shoot-out.

Winners advanced to the Nations League Finals and qualified for the 2027 CONCACAF Gold Cup, while losers qualified for the 2027 CONCACAF Gold Cup qualification.

=== Summary ===
The first legs were played on 12–14 November and the second legs were played on 15–17 November 2026.

Team 1	Agg.	Team 2	1st leg	2nd leg
Curaçao	0–2	Panama	0–0	0–2
Guatemala	3–7	Canada	2–3	1–4
Haiti	0–8	United States	0–6	0–2
Jamaica	3–3 (a)	Mexico	3–2	0–1

=== Matches ===
The fixture list was confirmed by CONCACAF on 9 October 2026. All match times are in EST (UTC−5) as listed by CONCACAF (local times, if different, are in parentheses).

12 November 2026
19:30 (20:30 UTC−4)

Curaçao	0–0	Panama
	Report

Ergilio Hato Stadium, Willemstad
Referee: Tori Penso (United States)
15 November 2026
18:00

Panama	2–0	Curaçao
Fajardo 45', 51'	Report

Estadio Rommel Fernández, Panama City
Referee: Marco Ortiz (Mexico)

Panama won 2–0 on aggregate, advanced to the Finals and qualified for the 2027 CONCACAF Gold Cup. Curaçao qualified for the 2027 CONCACAF Gold Cup qualification.

13 November 2026
21:00 (20:00 UTC−6)

Guatemala	2–3	Canada
Santis 54'; De Fougerolles 90+4' (o.g.)	Report	Oluwaseyi 18'; Millar 28'; J. David 45+2'

Manuel Felipe Carrera Stadium, Guatemala City
Referee: Iván Barton (El Salvador)
16 November 2026
20:00

Canada	4–1	Guatemala
J. David 39' (pen.); Oluwaseyi 45+1', 62'; Buchanan 53'	Report	Santis 34'

BMO Field, Toronto
Attendance: 17,126
Referee: César Ramos (Mexico)

Canada won 7–3 on aggregate, advanced to the Finals and qualified for the 2027 CONCACAF Gold Cup. Guatemala qualified for the 2027 CONCACAF Gold Cup qualification.

14 November 2026
16:30

Haiti	0–6	United States
	Report	Trusty 10'; Hall 52'; Pulisic 62' (pen.), 63'; McKennie 68'; Balogun 82'

Nu Stadium, Miami (United States) (Note: Haiti played their home quarter-final match at Nu Stadium in Miami, United States, due to the ongoing Haitian crisis.)
Attendance: 21,597
Referee: Walter López (Guatemala)
17 November 2026
19:00

United States	2–0	Haiti
Pulisic 25'; Hall 43'	Report

TQL Stadium, Cincinnati
Attendance: 24,001
Referee: Oshane Nation (Jamaica)

United States won 8–0 on aggregate, advanced to the Finals and qualified for the 2027 CONCACAF Gold Cup. Haiti qualified for the 2027 CONCACAF Gold Cup qualification.

14 November 2026
20:00

Jamaica	3–2	Mexico
Gallardo 27' (o.g.); Cephas 46'; King 63' (pen.)	Report	Mora 70'; Quiñones 81' (pen.)

Independence Park, Kingston
Referee: Mario Escobar (Guatemala)
17 November 2026
21:30 (20:30 UTC−6)

Mexico	1–0	Jamaica
Corona 35'	Report

Estadio BBVA, Guadalupe
Referee: Saíd Martínez (Honduras)

Tied 3–3 on aggregate. Mexico won on away goals, advanced to the Finals and qualified for the 2027 CONCACAF Gold Cup. Jamaica qualified for the 2027 CONCACAF Gold Cup qualification.

== Nations League Finals ==
=== Seeding ===
To determine the semifinal matchups, the four teams were ranked based on their results in the two quarter-final legs. The first seed will play the fourth seed and the second seed will play the third seed.

Seed	QF	Team	Pld	W	D	L	GF	GA	GD	Pts
1	QF3	United States	2	2	0	0	8	0	+8	6
2	QF2	Canada	2	2	0	0	7	3	+4	6
3	QF1	Panama	2	1	1	0	2	0	+2	4
4	QF4	Mexico	2	1	0	1	3	3	0	3

Source: CONCACAF
Rules for classification: Tiebreakers

=== Bracket ===
Semifinals
25 March – Inglewood
Canada
Panama
25 March – Inglewood
United States
Mexico

Final
28 March – Inglewood
Winner Match 1
Winner Match 2
Third-place playoff
28 March – Inglewood
Loser Match 1
Loser Match 2

=== Semifinals ===
25 March 2027
19:00 (16:00 UTC−7)

Canada	Match 1	Panama
	Report

SoFi Stadium, Inglewood

25 March 2027
22:15 (19:15 UTC−7)

United States	Match 2	Mexico
	Report

SoFi Stadium, Inglewood

=== Third-place playoff ===
28 March 2027
17:15 (14:15 UTC−7)

Loser Match 1	Match 3	Loser Match 2

SoFi Stadium, Inglewood

=== Final ===
28 March 2027
20:30 (17:30 UTC−7)

Winner Match 1	Match 4	Winner Match 2

SoFi Stadium, Inglewood

== Goalscorers ==
There have been 105 goals scored in 32 matches, for an average of 3.28 goals per match (as of 17 November 2026). Players highlighted in bold are still active in the competition.

4 goals

- (Costa Rica) Carlos Mora
- (Curaçao) Kenji Gorré
- (Guatemala) Óscar Santis

3 goals

- (Canada) **Tani Oluwaseyi**
- (Dominican Republic) Heinz Mörschel
- (Guatemala) William Fajardo
- (Haiti) Wilson Isidor
- (United States) **Christian Pulisic**

2 goals

- (Canada) **Jonathan David**
- (Costa Rica) Orlando Sinclair
- (Curaçao) Juninho Bacuna
- (Curaçao) Jordi Paulina
- (Dominican Republic) Mariano Díaz
- (El Salvador) Brayan Gil
- (Jamaica) Renaldo Cephas
- (Jamaica) Javon East
- (Martinique) Janis Antiste
- (Nicaragua) Jaime Moreno
- (Panama) **José Fajardo**
- (Suriname) Justin Lonwijk
- (United States) **Julian Hall**

1 goal

- (Canada) **Tajon Buchanan**
- (Canada) **Liam Millar**
- (Costa Rica) Kenyel Michel
- (Costa Rica) Andrey Soto
- (Curaçao) Leandro Bacuna
- (Curaçao) Tahith Chong
- (Curaçao) Livano Comenencia
- (Curaçao) Jürgen Locadia
- (Dominican Republic) Lucas Bretón
- (Dominican Republic) Dorny Romero
- (Dominican Republic) Pablo Rosario
- (El Salvador) Harold Osorio
- (El Salvador) Jefferson Valladares
- (Guatemala) Jorge Aparicio
- (Guatemala) Matt Evans
- (Guatemala) Darwin Lom
- (Guatemala) Rubio Rubin
- (Haiti) Jean-Ricner Bellegarde
- (Haiti) Louicius Deedson
- (Haiti) Yassin Fortuné
- (Haiti) Garven Metusala
- (Haiti) Fafà Picault
- (Honduras) Keyrol Figueroa
- (Honduras) Dereck Moncada
- (Honduras) Luis Palma
- (Honduras) Erick Puerto
- (Honduras) Bryan Róchez
- (Jamaica) Rumarn Burrell
- (Jamaica) Tyreece Campbell
- (Jamaica) Richard King
- (Jamaica) Kasey Palmer
- (Martinique) Jonathan Mexique
- (Martinique) Boris Moltenis
- (Martinique) Jonathan Varane
- (Mexico) **Jesús Corona**
- (Mexico) **Gilberto Mora**
- (Mexico) **Julián Quiñones**
- (Nicaragua) Byron Bonilla
- (Nicaragua) Juan Luis Pérez
- (Suriname) Denzel Jubitana
- (Suriname) Gyrano Kerk
- (Trinidad and Tobago) Wayne Frederick
- (Trinidad and Tobago) Levi García
- (Trinidad and Tobago) Luke Phillip
- (Trinidad and Tobago) Daniel Phillips
- (United States) **Folarin Balogun**
- (United States) **Weston McKennie**
- (United States) **Auston Trusty**

1 own goal

- (Canada) **Luc de Fougerolles** (against Guatemala)
- (Costa Rica) Francisco Calvo (against Haiti)
- (Honduras) Luis Palma (against Suriname)
- (Mexico) **Jesús Gallardo** (against Jamaica)
