= 2027 CONCACAF Gold Cup =

Copa Oro CONCACAF 2027 (Spanish)

Tournament details
- Host country: TBA
- Dates: June 17 – July 11
- Teams: 16
- Venue: TBA (in TBA host cities)

The 2027 CONCACAF Gold Cup will be the 19th edition of the CONCACAF Gold Cup, the biennial international men's soccer championship of North, Central American and Caribbean region organized by CONCACAF. The tournament will take place from June 17 to July 11, 2027.

Mexico are the two-time defending champions, having won the 2025 final against the United States. CONCACAF teams will qualify for the tournament via the 2026–27 CONCACAF Nations League or Prelims.

== Format change ==
On November 5, 2026, CONCACAF announced that the tournament's group stage round would consist of two groups of eight teams, instead of the groups of four as with past tournaments, from this edition onwards. In each group, the eight teams will be divided into four "bands" based on their pot, with each team playing one opponent from each band. The top four teams in each group qualify for the quarter-finals.

== Teams ==
=== Qualification ===
As with prior editions of the Gold Cup, the 2026–27 CONCACAF Nations League will be used as the qualifying mechanism for the 2027 tournament. The four teams that qualified for the 2027 CONCACAF Nations League Finals (those who won their quarter-finals) and each of the four group winners in League B automatically qualified. The relegated teams from League A (5th and 6th in each of the two groups) and promoted teams from League C (the three group winners and the best runner-up) will contest the League A + C Play-ins, consisting of four two-legged matchups. The winners of the League A + C Play-ins will then be joined by the losers of the League A quarter-finals, the third and fourth-placed teams in both League A groups, and the best two runner-up teams in League B in the Gold Cup Prelims, consisting of seven two-legged matchups. The winners of each Gold Cup Prelim matchup will qualify for the Gold Cup.

On December 19, 2024, CONCACAF announced that Saudi Arabia would be invited as a guest team for the 2025 and 2027 tournaments.

Team	Qualification	Date of qualification	Gold Cup appearances (+ CONCACAF Championship)	Last appearance	Previous best Gold Cup performance (Note: Bold indicates that the corresponding team was hosting or co-hosting the event.) (+ CONCACAF Championship)	Rankings at start of event	
Team	Qualification	Date of qualification	Gold Cup appearances (+ CONCACAF Championship)	Last appearance	Previous best Gold Cup performance (+ CONCACAF Championship)	FIFA	CONCACAF
Saudi Arabia	Invited guests	December 19, 2024	2nd	2025	Quarter-finals (2025)	TBD	N/A
Panama	CNL League A quarter-final winners	November 15, 2026	13th (14th)	2025	Runners-up (2005, 2013, 2023)	TBD	TBD
Cuba	CNL League B Group C winners	November 16, 2026	11th (13th)	2023	Quarter-finals (2003, 2013, 2015); Fourth place (1971)	TBD	TBD
Guyana	CNL League B Group A winners	November 16, 2026	2nd	2019	Group stage (2019)	TBD	TBD
Canada	CNL League A quarter-final winners	November 16, 2026	18th (21st)	2025	Champions (2000); Champions (1985)	TBD	TBD
Saint Lucia	CNL League B Group B winners	November 17, 2026	1st	N/A	Debut	TBD	TBD
Saint Vincent and the Grenadines	CNL League B Group D winners	November 17, 2026	2nd	1996	Group stage (1996)	TBD	TBD
United States	CNL League A quarter-final winners	November 17, 2026	19th (21st)	2025	Champions (1991, 2002, 2005, 2007, 2013, 2017, 2021); Runners-up (1989)	TBD	TBD
Mexico (title holders)	CNL League A quarter-final winners	November 17, 2026	19th (27th)	2025	Champions (1993, 1996, 1998, 2003, 2009, 2011, 2015, 2019, 2023, 2025); Champions (1965, 1971, 1977)	TBD	TBD

=== Draw ===
The final draw will be held on April 8, 2027.

== Group stage ==
=== Group A ===
Pos	Team	Pld	W	D	L	GF	GA	GD	Pts	Qualification
1	A1	0	0	0	0	0	0	0	0	Advance to knockout stage
2	A2	0	0	0	0	0	0	0	0	Advance to knockout stage
3	A3	0	0	0	0	0	0	0	0	Advance to knockout stage
4	A4	0	0	0	0	0	0	0	0	Advance to knockout stage
5	A5	0	0	0	0	0	0	0	0	
6	A6	0	0	0	0	0	0	0	0	
7	A7	0	0	0	0	0	0	0	0	
8	A8	0	0	0	0	0	0	0	0	

First match(es) will be played: June 17, 2027. Source: CONCACAF

=== Group B ===
Pos	Team	Pld	W	D	L	GF	GA	GD	Pts	Qualification
1	B1	0	0	0	0	0	0	0	0	Advance to knockout stage
2	B2	0	0	0	0	0	0	0	0	Advance to knockout stage
3	B3	0	0	0	0	0	0	0	0	Advance to knockout stage
4	B4	0	0	0	0	0	0	0	0	Advance to knockout stage
5	B5	0	0	0	0	0	0	0	0	
6	B6	0	0	0	0	0	0	0	0	
7	B7	0	0	0	0	0	0	0	0	
8	B8	0	0	0	0	0	0	0	0	

First match(es) will be played: June 17, 2027. Source: CONCACAF

== Knockout stage ==
Quarter-finals
July 3–4
July 3–4
July 3–4
July 3–4

Semi-finals
July 7–8
July 7–8

Final
July 11

=== Quarter-finals ===
July 2027

Match 65

July 2027

Match 66

July 2027

Match 67

July 2027

Match 68

== Marketing ==
=== Broadcasting rights ===
==== Americas ====
Territory	Broadcast	Ref.
Mexico	Netflix	
United States	Fox Sports (English); Univision (Spanish)	
