= Nitrianske Hrnčiarovce =

Nitrianske Hrnčiarovce Nyitragerencsér
- Municipality
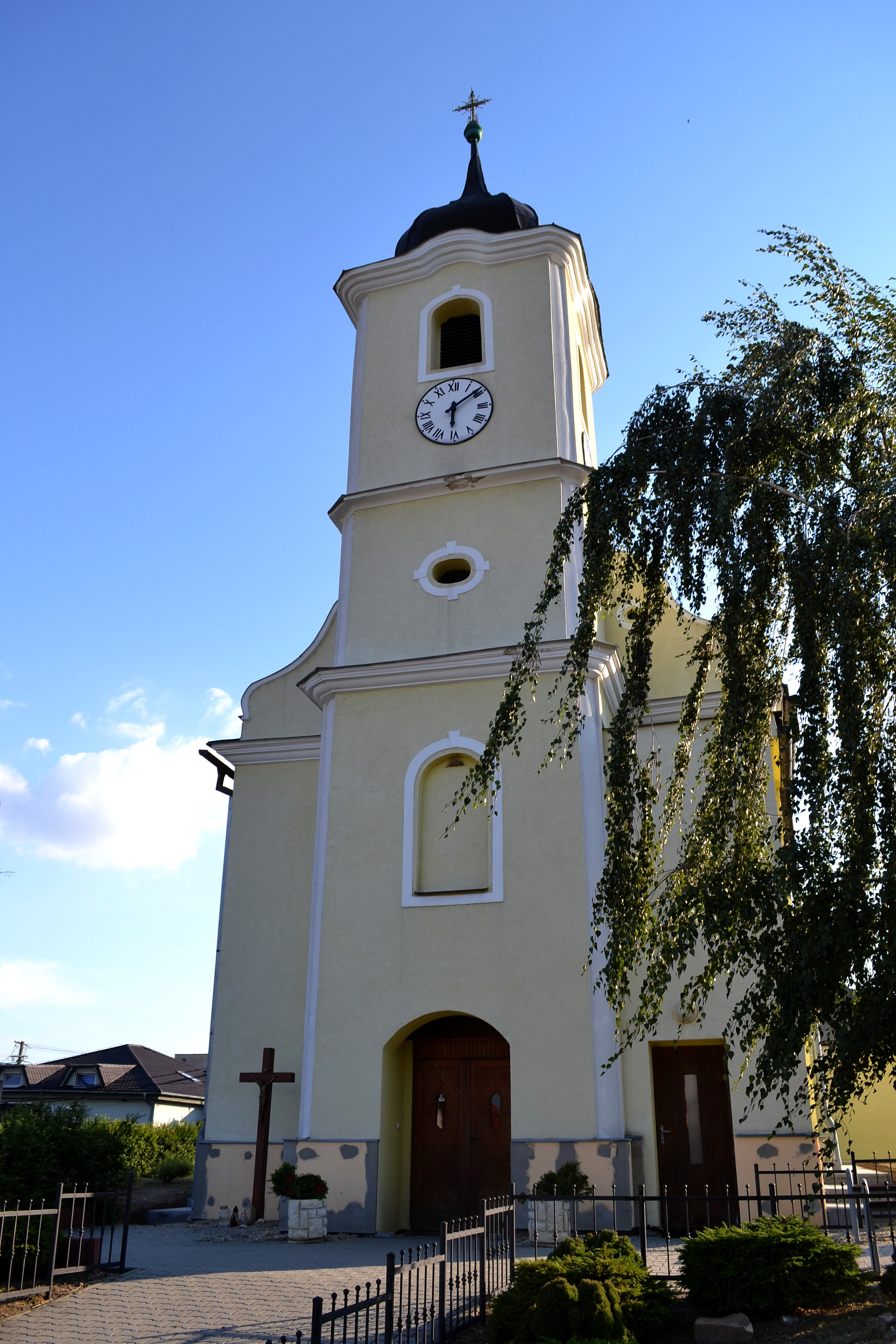
- Church of Saint George

- Flag

- Location of Nitrianske Hrnčiarovce in the Nitra Region Location of Nitrianske Hrnčiarovce in Slovakia
- Coordinates: 48.33°N 18.13°E
- Country: Slovakia
- Region: Nitra Region
- District: Nitra District
- First mentioned: 1113

Area
  - Total: 9.94 km^{2} (3.84 sq mi)
- Elevation: 204 m (669 ft)

Population (2025)
  - Total: 2,441
- Time zone: UTC+1 (CET)
  - Summer (DST): UTC+2 (CEST)
- Postal code: 951 01
- Area code: +421 37
- Vehicle registration plate (until 2022): NR
- Website: www.nitrianskehrnciarovce.sk

Nitrianske Hrnčiarovce (Slovak: [ˈɲitrɪɐnske ˈɦr̩ntʂɪɐrɔwtse]; Hungarian: Nyitragerencsér) is a village and municipality in the Nitra District in western central Slovakia, in the Nitra Region.

== History ==
In historical records the village was first mentioned in 1113.

== Geography ==
The municipality lies at an altitude of 204 metres (669 ft) and covers an area of 9.94 km^{2} (3.84 sq mi) (2025).

== Population ==
Population statistic (10 years)
Year	1995	2005	2015	2025
Count	1583	1837	2041	2441
Difference		+16.04%	+11.10%	+19.59%

Population statistic
Year	2024	2025
Count	2412	2441
Difference		+1.20%

It has a population of 2441 people (31 December 2025).

=== Ethnicity ===
Census 2021 (1+ %)
Ethnicity	Number	Fraction
Slovak	1772	80.69%
Hungarian	335	15.25%
Not found out	130	5.91%
Total	2196	

In year 2021 was 2196 people by ethnicity 1772 as Slovak, 335 as Hungarian, 130 as Not found out, 14 as Czech, 14 as Russian, 14 as Other, 5 as Rusyn, 4 as Romani, 3 as German, 3 as Greek, 2 as Ukrainian, 2 as Italian, 2 as Canadian, 1 as Jewish, 1 as Polish, 1 as Moravian and 1 as Croatian.

Note on population: The difference values of population numbers in the table "Population statistic" and in the sections "Ethnicity" & "Religion" is caused by the use of various statistical methods.

=== Religion ===
Census 2021 (1+ %)
Religion	Number	Fraction
Roman Catholic Church	1421	64.71%
None	511	23.27%
Not found out	131	5.97%
Evangelical Church	45	2.05%
Total	2196	

In year 2021 was 2196 people by religion 1421 from Roman Catholic Church, 511 from None, 131 from Not found out, 45 from Evangelical Church, 15 from Christian Congregations in Slovakia, 14 from Eastern Orthodox Church, 12 from Greek Catholic Church, 9 from Apostolic Church, 7 from Ad hoc movements, 6 from Paganism and natural spirituality, 6 from Other and not ascertained christian church, 4 from Other, 4 from Buddhism, 3 from Calvinist Church, 2 from Jewish community, 2 from United Methodist Church, 1 from Old Catholic Church, 1 from Jehovah's Witnesses, 1 from Church of the Brethren and 1 from Church of Jesus Christ of Latter-day Saints.

== Facilities ==
The village has a public library and a football pitch.
