= Harold Osorio =

Salvadoran footballer (born 2003)

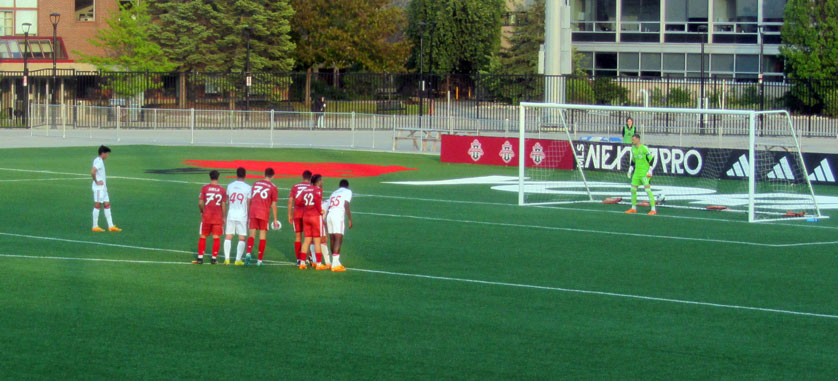
- Harold Osorio takes a penalty kick against Luka Gavran

Personal information
- Full name: Harold Daniel Osorio Moreno
- Date of birth: 20 August 2003 (age 23)
- Place of birth: San Salvador, El Salvador
- Height: 1.79 m (5 ft 10 in)
- Position: Attacking midfielder

Team information
- Current team: Alianza (SLV)

Youth career
- Alianza (SLV)

Senior career*
Years	Team	Apps	(Gls)
2020–2022	Alianza (SLV)	18	(2)
2022–2025	Chicago Fire II	44	(16)
2025	Chicago Fire	1	(0)
2026–	Alianza (SLV)		

International career
2019	El Salvador U17	3	(0)
2022	El Salvador U20	4	(1)
2021–	El Salvador	20	(3)
- * Club domestic league appearances and goals

Harold Daniel Osorio Moreno (born 20 August 2003) is a Salvadoran professional footballer who plays as an attacking midfielder for Primera División club Alianza and the El Salvador national team.

== Club career ==
=== Chicago Fire ===
On 1 March 2025, Osorio made his MLS debut against DC United.

== Career statistics ==
=== International ===
As of match played 17 November 2026

Appearances and goals by national team and year
National team	Year	Apps	Goals
El Salvador
El Salvador	2021	2	0
El Salvador	2022	1	0
El Salvador	2023	5	0
El Salvador	2025	7	1
El Salvador	2026	5	1
Total		20	3

El Salvador score listed first, score column indicates score after each Osorio goal.

List of international goals scored by Harold Osorio
No.	Date	Venue	Opponent	Score	Result	Competition
1	5 September 2025	Cementos Progreso Stadium, Guatemala City, Guatemala	Guatemala	1–0	1–0	2026 FIFA World Cup qualification
2	25 September 2026	Estadio Jorge "El Mágico" González, San Salvador, El Salvador	Martinique	3–1	3–1	2026–27 CONCACAF Nations League A
