= 2027 CONCACAF Nations League Finals =

Tournament details
- Host country: United States
- Dates: March 25–28
- Teams: 4
- Venue: 1 (in 1 host city)

The 2027 CONCACAF Nations League Finals will be the final tournament of the 2026–27 edition of the CONCACAF Nations League, the fourth season of the international football competition involving the men's national teams of the 41 member associations of CONCACAF. It will be held on March 25 and 28, 2027, at the SoFi Stadium in Inglewood, California, United States.

Mexico are the defending champions.

== Format ==
The Nations League Finals will be contested by the winners of the four quarter-finals of League A. The tournament will take place over four days and will be played in single-leg knockout matches, consisting of two semifinals on March 25, and a third-place playoff and final three days later on March 28.

In the CONCACAF Nations League Finals, if the scores are level at the end of normal time, 30 minutes of extra time will be played. If the score is still level after extra time, the winner will be determined by a penalty shoot-out.

== Venue ==
Location of the host city of the 2027 CONCACAF Nations League Finals.

- 1 Inglewood

SoFi Stadium, located in Inglewood, California, in the Los Angeles Metropolitan Area, was announced as the venue for the 2025 and 2027 CONCACAF Nations League Finals on October 9, 2024.

City	Stadium
Inglewood (Los Angeles Area)	SoFi Stadium
Capacity: 70,240

== Qualified teams ==
The Nations League Finals will be contested by the winners of the four League A quarter-finals.

Match	Winners	Date of qualification	Appearances		Previous best CNL Finals performance	Rankings	
Match	Winners	Date of qualification	Total	Last	Previous best CNL Finals performance	CONCACAF Feb. 2027	FIFA Nov. 2026
QF1	Panama	November 15, 2026	4th	2025	Runners-up (2025)	TBA	45
QF2	Canada	November 16, 2026	3rd	2025	Runners-up (2023)	TBA	25
QF3	United States	November 17, 2026	5th	2025	Champions (2021, 2023, 2024)	TBA	16
QF4	Mexico	November 17, 2026	5th	2025	Champions (2025)	TBA	13

== Seeding ==
To determine the semifinal matchups, the four teams were ranked based on their results in the two quarter-final legs. The first seed will play the fourth seed and the second seed will play the third seed.

Seed	QF	Team	Pld	W	D	L	GF	GA	GD	Pts
1	QF3	United States	2	2	0	0	8	0	+8	6
2	QF2	Canada	2	2	0	0	7	3	+4	6
3	QF1	Panama	2	1	1	0	2	0	+2	4
4	QF4	Mexico	2	1	0	1	3	3	0	3

Source: CONCACAF
Rules for classification: Tiebreakers

== Squads ==
Each national team will have to submit a final squad of 23 players, three of whom must be goalkeepers, no later than ten days before the opening match of the tournament. If a player presents medical reasons or becomes injured severely enough to prevent his participation in the tournament before his team's first match, he may be replaced by another player.

== Bracket ==
Semifinals
March 25 – Inglewood
Canada
Panama
March 25 – Inglewood
United States
Mexico

Final
March 28 – Inglewood
Winner Match 1
Winner Match 2
Third-place playoff
March 28 – Inglewood
Loser Match 1
Loser Match 2

All match times are in EDT (UTC−4) as listed by CONCACAF (local times are in parentheses).

== Semifinals ==
March 25, 2027
19:00 (16:00 UTC−7)

Canada	Match 1	Panama
	Report

SoFi Stadium, Inglewood

March 25, 2027
22:15 (19:15 UTC−7)

United States	Match 2	Mexico
	Report

SoFi Stadium, Inglewood

== Third-place playoff ==
March 28, 2027
17:15 (14:15 UTC−7)

Loser Match 1	Match 3	Loser Match 2

SoFi Stadium, Inglewood

== Final ==
March 28, 2027
20:30 (17:30 UTC−7)

Winner Match 1	Match 4	Winner Match 2

SoFi Stadium, Inglewood
