= List of Bonaire international footballers =

In April 2013, the Bonaire Football Federation was granted associate membership in CONCACAF and was promoted to full membership in June 2014. Bonaire also became a full member of the Caribbean Football Union in 2013.

Below is a list of footballers who have appeared for the Bonaire national football team since being accepted into CONCACAF. Players who represented Bonaire in unofficial internationals before obtaining CONCACAF membership are not included.

== A ==
- Jerson Agostien
- Jursen Albertus
- Thierry Anthony

== B ==
- Robbert Barendse
- Suehendley Barzey
- Angenor Beaumont
- Jozef Beaumont
- Sigrel Burnet

== C ==
- Kevinson Cecilia
- Leonard Coffie
- Naygel Coffie
- Raymiro Coffie

== F ==
- Tevin Francis
- Rishison Frans
- Robert Frans
- Terrence Frans

== G ==
- Igmard Gijsbertha

== H ==
- Tom Homburg

== J ==
- Rilove Janga
- Rolando Janzen
- Matias Jaurretche
- Rugenio Josephia

== M ==
- Giovanie Makaai
- Railey Martijn
- Rowendley Martijn
- Guillermo Montero

== P ==
- Lacey Pauletta
- André Piar
- Ilfred Piar

== R ==
- Pedro Rodriguez Vergara

== S ==
- Yurick Seinpaal
- Giandro Steba

== T ==
- Rachid Trenidad
- Terrance Trinidad

== V ==
- Miguel Valenzuela Ore
- Reuben Vlijt

== W ==
- Edelbert Winklaar

== Z ==
- Christian Zuninga
