= Guillermo Montero =

Bonairean footballer (born 1997)

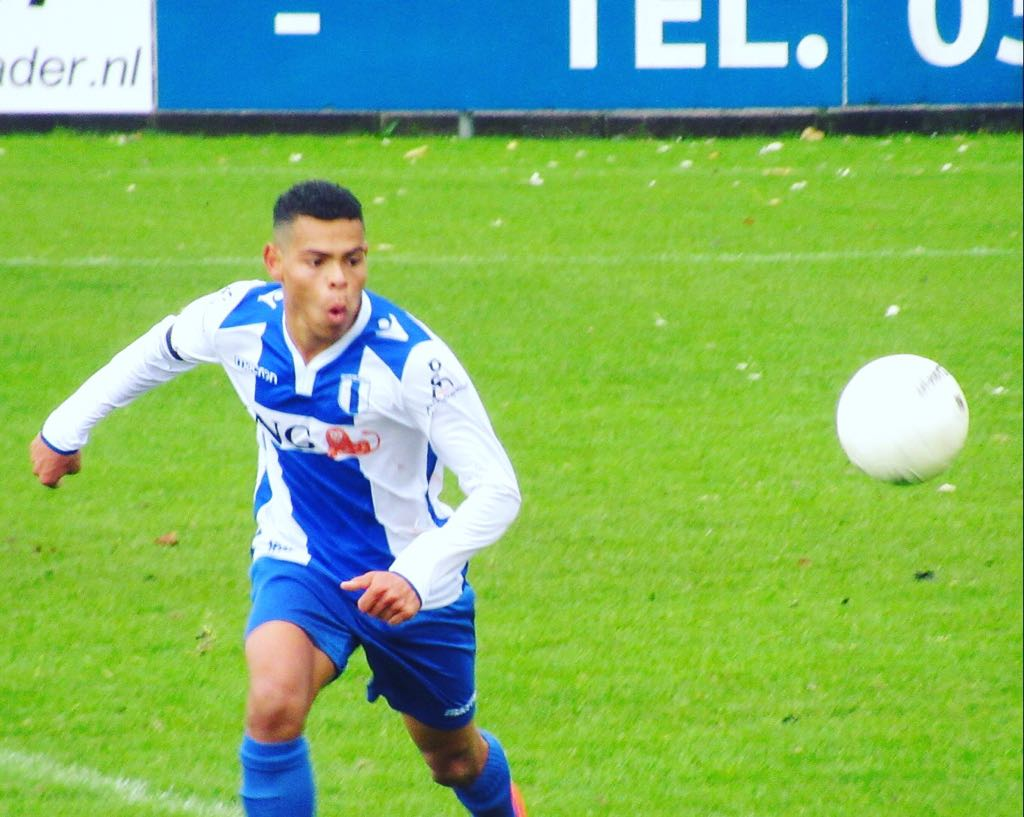

Personal information
- Full name: Guillermo Francisco Montero
- Date of birth: 12 January 1997 (age 29)
- Place of birth: Kralendijk, Bonaire
- Position: Forward

Team information
- Current team: GVV Unitas

Youth career
- 2017: Excelsior Maassluis
- 2017–2019: USV Elinkwijk
- 2019–2021: Kozakken Boys
- 2021: ASWH

Senior career*
Years	Team	Apps	(Gls)
2013–2017	Vitesse		
2021–2022	Atlético Benidorm	6	(0)
2022	Pașcani	3	(0)
2022–2023	Vitesse	11	(8)
2023	Baronie		
2023	GVV Unitas		
2023–2024	Dakota	3	(2)
2024–	GVV Unitas		

International career
2014–2023	Bonaire	9	(2)
- * Club domestic league appearances and goals as of 10:07, 15 November 2024 (UTC)

Guillermo Francisco Montero (born 1 January 1997) is a professional footballer who plays as a forward for GVV Unitas. In June 2017 one media outlet named him Bonaire's best footballer under twenty years old.

== Club career ==
Montero began his senior career with SV Vitesse of the Bonaire League in 2013. For the 2015/2016 season, he was the league's top goal scorer with 15 goals in 14 matches. In February 2017, he went on trial with Dutch Lions FC, parent company of American clubs in Cincinnati, Dayton, and Houston, in Roosendaal, Netherlands.

In May 2017, it was announced that Montero had signed for Excelsior Maassluis of the Tweede Divisie, the third division of football in the Netherlands.

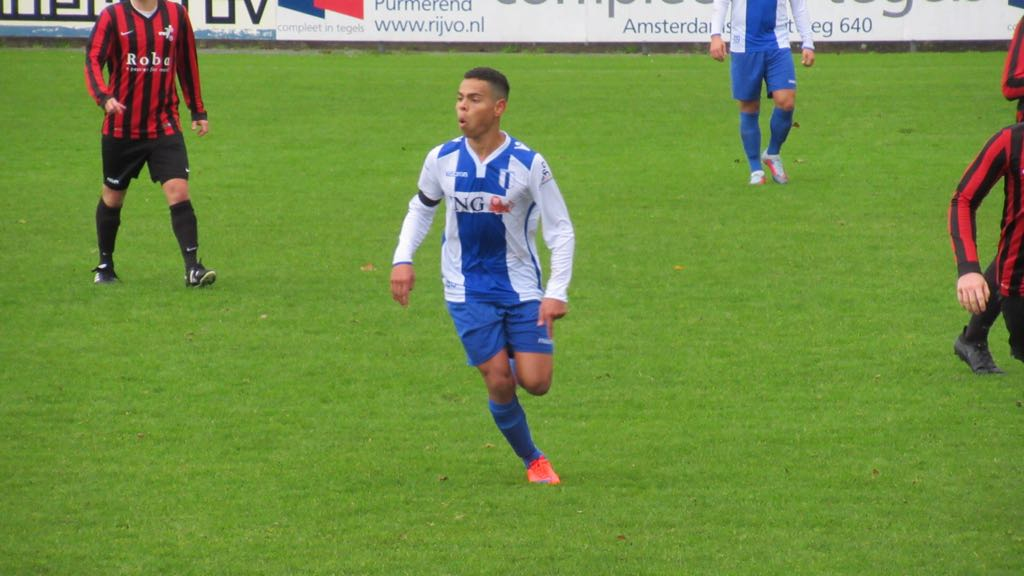
Montero in action for USV Elinkwijk in 2017

Later in 2017 Montero moved to USV Elinkwijk of the Dutch Hoofdklasse, the Dutch fifth division. Fellow Bonaire international Rachid Trenidad also spent time at the club around this time. Montero made his debut for the senior squad on 18 October 2017 in a 2–2 draw with RKSV DCG. He started the match and put the ball into the back of the net in the 20th minute of the match. However, the goal was ruled offside. Only eight minutes later, Montero struck again, this time counting for his first league goal for the club. Shortly thereafter, he scored several other goals including against SCH'44 on 30 October 2017, Hooglanderveen on 29 January 2018, and local rivals SV Kampong on 4 February 2018. On 28 February 2018, after scoring five league goals and twelve goals for USV Elinkwijk's youth team, it was announced that Montero's contract had been extended through the 2018–2019 season. In mid-March 2018, Montero was named "Player of the Match" for his performance against Voetbalvereniging IJsselstein (VVIJ).

In Summer 2019 Montero returned to the Tweede Divisie, signing for Kozakken Boys for the 2019–20 season. During his last season with the club, he was the reserve team's top scorer. In May 2021 Montero joined ASWH Ambacht, also of the Tweede Divisie, during the 2021–22 Tweede Divisie preseason.

After four years in the Netherlands without breaking into the first team of a club, Montero signed for Atlético Benidorm of the Spanish Divisiones Regionales de Fútbol in 2021. He left the club after the season when the new manager wanted to build the roster with local players. Following his departure he went on trial with IJsselmeervogels, A.S.D. Nocerina 1910, and GKS Jastrzębie before signing a professional contract with CSM Pașcani of Romania's Liga III in February 2022. He made his league debut for the club as a starter on 11 March 2022 in a 1–1 draw with CS Dante Botoşani. The following week he started again in the club's 2–2 draw with CSM Bacău.

After a brief return to domestic football, it was reported by the club that Montero was finalizing a deal with Dutch Vierde Divisie club VV Baronie in March 2023. Following the season, Monteiro departed the club and joined GVV Unitas of the Derde Divisie in summer 2023.

In late August 2023, Montero left VV Unitas to return to the Caribbean by signing for SV Dakota of the Aruban Division di Honor.

== International career ==
Montero made his senior international debut on 7 September 2014 in a 1–4 defeat to Barbados during 2014 Caribbean Cup qualification after coming on as a 74th-minute substitute for Tom Homburg. In December 2015, Montero was named to a provisional squad by Bonaire head coach Ferdinand Bernabela in preparation for 2017 Caribbean Cup qualification. However, Bonaire ultimately did not enter the competition. He returned to the national team in 2019 for 2019–20 CONCACAF Nations League qualification.

Bonaire hosted its first-ever home match on 28 March 2023 to close out its 2022–23 CONCACAF Nations League C campaign, just short of ten years after becoming a member of the CFU and CONCACAF. Montero opened the scoring with a goal from a free kick outside of the penalty area, thus scoring the first-ever official goal on Bonaire soil.

=== International goals ===
Scores and results list Bonaire's goal tally first.

No.	Date	Venue	Opponent	Score	Result	Competition
1.	25 March 2023	Bethlehem Soccer Stadium, Saint Croix, US Virgin Islands	Sint Maarten	1–5	1–6	2022–23 CONCACAF Nations League C
2.	28 March 2023	Stadion Antonio Trenidat, Rincon, Bonaire	Turks and Caicos Islands	1–0	1–2	2022–23 CONCACAF Nations League C
Last updated 28 March 2023

=== International appearances ===
As of match played 28 March 2023

International appearances
#	Date	Venue	Opponent	Result^{†}	Competition
2014
1	7 September	Stade Pierre-Aliker, Fort-de-France, Martinique	Barbados	1–4	2014 Caribbean Cup qualification
2019
2	21 March	Arnos Vale Stadium, Arnos Vale, Saint Vincent and the Grenadines	Saint Vincent and the Grenadines	1–2	2019–20 CONCACAF Nations League qualification
3	24 March	Raymond E. Guishard Technical Centre, The Valley, Anguilla	British Virgin Islands	2–1	2019–20 CONCACAF Nations League qualification
2022
4	3 June	TCIFA National Academy, Providenciales, Turks and Caicos Islands	Turks and Caicos Islands	4–1	2022–23 CONCACAF Nations League C
5	6 June	Stadion Rignaal Jean Francisca, Willemstad, Curaçao	Sint Maarten	2–2	2022–23 CONCACAF Nations League C
6	11 June	Bethlehem Soccer Stadium, Saint Croix, United States Virgin Islands	U.S. Virgin Islands	2–0	2022–23 CONCACAF Nations League C
7	14 June	Stadion Rignaal Jean Francisca, Willemstad, Curaçao	U.S. Virgin Islands	2–0	2022–23 CONCACAF Nations League C
2023
8	25 March	Bethlehem Soccer Stadium, Upper Bethlehem, U.S. Virgin Islands	Sint Maarten	1–6	2022–23 CONCACAF Nations League C
9	28 March	Stadion Antonio Trenidat, Rincon, Bonaire	Turks and Caicos Islands	1–2	2022–23 CONCACAF Nations League C
Bonaire's goal tally first.

=== International statistics ===
As of match played 28 March 2023

Bonaire
Year	Apps	Goals
2014	1	0
2015	0	0
2016	0	0
2017	0	0
2018	0	0
2019	2	0
2020	0	0
2021	0	0
2022	4	0
2023	2	2
Total	9	2
