= Nelson Amadin =

Dutch footballer (born 2001)

Personal information
- Full name: Nelson Efosa Amadin
- Date of birth: 31 October 2001 (age 25)
- Place of birth: Rotterdam, Netherlands
- Height: 1.85 m (6 ft 1 in)
- Position: Forward

Team information
- Current team: Emmen
- Number: 11

Youth career
- –2011: Spartaan'20
- 2011–2019: Feyenoord

Senior career*
| Years | Team | Apps | (Gls) |
| 2019–2021 | Dordrecht | 20 | (0) |
| 2022–2024 | Schalke 04 II | 43 | (16) |
| 2024–2025 | TSV Hartberg | 5 | (0) |
| 2025– | Emmen | 15 | (3) |
- * Club domestic league appearances and goals as of 28 April 2026

Nelson Efosa Amadin (born 31 October 2001) is a Dutch professional footballer who plays as a forward for Eerste Divisie club Emmen.

== Career ==
=== Dordrecht ===
Born in Rotterdam, Amadin started his career in the youth of Spartaan '20, before moving to the Feyenoord academy. In 2019, he moved to FC Dordrecht as a free agent and signing a two-year contract. He made his senior debut on 15 November 2019 in a 1–1 home draw against Roda JC Kerkrade, coming on as a substitute in the 66th minute for Thomas Schalekamp. His contract was not renewed, making him a free agent on 1 July 2021.

=== Schalke 04 II ===
On 7 January 2022, Amadin announced via Instagram that he had joined Schalke 04. Shortly after, the club confirmed the signing and stated that he had been added to the reserve team competing in Regionalliga West. He made his debut for the club on 22 January in a 4–1 away victory against Borussia Mönchengladbach II, immediately contributing with two goals to secure the win.

=== Emmen ===
On 1 July 2025, Amadin signed a two-year contract with Emmen.

== Personal life ==
Born in the Netherlands, Amadin is of Nigerian descent. He is the cousin of Manchester United player Joshua Zirkzee. They both played youth football with Spartaan '20.

== Career statistics ==
As of 9 July 2024

Appearances and goals by club, season and competition
| Club | Season | League | | | Cup | | Total | |
| Club | Season | Division | Apps | Goals | Apps | Goals | Apps | Goals |
|---|---|---|---|---|---|---|---|---|
| Dordrecht | 2019–20 | Eerste Divisie | 5 | 0 | 1 | 0 | 6 | 0 |
| Dordrecht | 2020–21 | Eerste Divisie | 15 | 0 | 0 | 0 | 15 | 0 |
| Dordrecht | Total | | 20 | 0 | 1 | 0 | 21 | 0 |
| Schalke 04 II | 2021–22 | Regionalliga West | 4 | 3 | — | | 4 | 3 |
| Schalke 04 II | 2022–23 | Regionalliga West | 11 | 1 | — | | 11 | 1 |
| Schalke 04 II | 2023–24 | Regionalliga West | 28 | 12 | — | | 28 | 12 |
| Schalke 04 II | Total | | 43 | 16 | — | | 43 | 16 |
| TSV Hartberg | 2024–25 | Austrian Bundesliga | 0 | 0 | 0 | 0 | 0 | 0 |
| Career total | | | 63 | 16 | 1 | 0 | 64 | 16 |
