= Borja Calvo =

Spanish footballer

Personal information
- Full name: Borja Calvo Montón
- Date of birth: 29 January 2002 (age 24)
- Place of birth: Benidorm, Spain
- Height: 1.77 m (5 ft 10 in)
- Position: Midfielder

Team information
- Current team: Eldense
- Number: 6

Youth career
- SF Benidorm CD
- 2019–2020: Hércules
- 2020–2021: Levante

Senior career*
Years	Team	Apps	(Gls)
2018–2019	SF Benidorm CD	42	(7)
2020	Hércules B	1	(0)
2021–2022	La Nucía B	11	(1)
2022–2023	La Nucía	43	(7)
2023–2025	Valencia B	55	(10)
2025–	Eldense	26	(3)
- * Club domestic league appearances and goals as of 17 August 2026

Borja Calvo Montón (born 29 January 2002) is a Spanish footballer who plays as a midfielder for CD Eldense.

== Career ==
Born in Benidorm, Alicante, Valencian Community, Calvo began his career with hometown side SF Benidorm CD, making his first team debut at the age of 16 in February 2018. In the following season, he was a regular starter for the club, before subsequently playing for the Juvenil squads of Hércules CF and Levante UD in the following two years.

In 2021, Calvo moved to CF La Nucía, being initially assigned to the B-team in the Regional Preferente, before starting to appear with the main squad in Segunda Federación in November of that year. The following July, he was definitely promoted to the first team, now in Primera Federación, but was mainly a backup option as the club suffered immediate relegation.

On 9 August 2023, Calvo moved to another reserve team, Valencia CF Mestalla in the fourth division. On 25 June 2025, after two seasons as a starter, he returned to the third tier with CD Eldense on a two-year contract.

On 18 June 2026, after scoring three goals in 27 matches overall as the club achieved promotion to Segunda División, Calvo extended his link with the Azulgranas for a further year. He made his professional debut on 17 August, coming on as a late substitute for Guille Macho in a 3–0 away loss to UD Almería.
