= Emmanuel Cristori =

Argentine footballer

Personal information
- Birth name: Emmanuel Alexis Cristori
- Date of birth: 5 May 1986 (age 40)
- Place of birth: Córdoba, Argentina
- Height: 1.85 m (6 ft 1 in)
- Position: Forward

Senior career*
Years	Team	Apps	(Gls)
2005–2006	Alhaurino		
2006–2007	Poli Ejido B		
2007	→Lucena (loan)		
2007–2008	Real Murcia B		
2008–2009	Vera		
2009–2010	Ionikos		
2010	Alhaurino		
2011	La Paz	13	(2)
2011–2012	Persiba Bantul		
2013–2014	Chacarita Juniors	2	(0)
2015	Lincoln Red Imps		

Managerial career
- 2018–2019: Bonaire MNT
- * Club domestic league appearances and goals

Emmanuel Alexis Cristori (born 5 May 1986 in Córdoba, Argentina) is an Argentine former professional footballer who played as a forward.

== Clubs ==
- Alhaurino 2005–2006
- Poli Ejido B 2006–2007
- Lucena 2007 (loan)
- Real Murcia B 2007–2008
- Vera 2008–2009
- Ionikos 2009–2010
- Alhaurino 2010
- La Paz 2011
- Persiba Bantul 2011–2012
- Chacarita Juniors 2013–2014
- Lincoln Red Imps 2015
