= GVV Unitas =

Dutch football club

- Full name: Gorinchemse Voetbalvereniging Unitas
- Founded: 19 April 1898; 128 years ago
- Ground: Sportpark Molenvliet, Gorinchem
- Capacity: 3,000
- Chairman: Marcel ter Wal
- Head coach: Jeroen van Bezouwen
- League: Eerste Klasse
- 2024–25: Vierde Divisie B, 14th of 16 (relegated via play-offs)
- Website: https://www.gvvunitas.nl/
Home colours

The Gorinchemse Voetbalvereniging Unitas is a Dutch association football club from Gorinchem. It is among the oldest football clubs of the Netherlands and for most of the 20th century played in the highest leagues of amateur football. In 2018 the first team of GVV Unitas returned to the Hoofdklasse. They won promotion to the Derde Divisie in 2020.

== History ==
GVV Unitas was founded on 19 April 1898. It joined the main KNVB leagues in 2007, initially as a Derde Klasse team. In 2011 Unitas promoted to the Tweede Klasse. In 1924 it won a Tweede Klasse championship, promoting to the Eerste Klasse, at that time the highest league of Dutch football. In 1926 Unitas relegated to the Tweede Klasse. It won Tweede Klasse championships in 1928, 1944, and 1946 but did not promote to the costly leading league.

In 1956 Unitas promoted for a second time to the Eerste Klasse, after winning its fifth Tweede Klasse championship, and after a league above the Eerste Klasse had been established. In 1963 and 1967 it became champion of the Eerste Klasse without promoting. In 1970 Unitas relegated to the Tweede Klasse, immediately returning to the Eerste with a sixth Tweede Klasse championship.

In 1998 the club celebrated 100 years with several events. Coen Moulijn suffered a heart attack at the event he attended.

Since 2018 Unitas is back the Hoofdklasse, after taking a championship in the Eerste Klasse. It finished the first Hoofdklasse season in decades in 5th position. Last game of the first Saturday squad of the 2018–2019 season ended in a 7–0 loss to SV Meerkerk.

== Current squad ==
As of 6 August 2023

Note: Flags indicate national team as defined under FIFA eligibility rules; some limited exceptions apply. Players may hold more than one non-FIFA nationality.

No.	Pos.	Nation	Player
1	GK	NED	Luc van Dongen
4	DF	NED	Alexander McDermott
6	DF	NED	Mekonen Kibrom Mihreteab
7	FW	SMA	Elmer de Vries
8	MF	NED	Joey Lokasi
10	MF	NED	Najim Haddouchi
16	MF	NED	Daan Ruwaard
17	FW	NED	Raphael Nartey
18	MF	NED	Daan Goes
19	FW	NED	Thomas Schalekamp
20	FW	NED	Mauritsio Helstone
21	MF	ERI	Medhanie Habtemariam
24	DF	ERI	Essey Kiflom
25	DF	NED	Freek Langermans
26	FW	NED	Gijs van de Louw

No.	Pos.	Nation	Player
31	FW	BOE	Guillermo Montero
—	GK	NED	Félino Helderton
—	DF	NED	Junior Ashu
—	DF	NED	Shaquille Codrington
—	DF	NED	Giannique de Vulder
—	DF	NED	Kevin Nikolov
—	MF	NED	Melis Kocan
—	MF	NED	Brandon Markham
—	MF	NED	Boris Pijlman
—	MF	NED	Sem van den Dool
—	MF	NED	Noam van Wijk
—	FW	NED	Jip Kegge
—	FW	NED	Daan Romijn
—	FW	NED	Shenty Saez

== Players who became internationals ==
- Jan Peters
- Robert Verbeek
- Hans Vonk
- Frank Wels
