= Brian van den Bergh =

Aruban football manager

Personal information
- Place of birth: Aruba

Managerial career
- Years: Team
- 2019: Bonaire

Brian van den Bergh is an Aruban football manager.

== Managerial career ==
In September 2019, van den Bergh was appointed manager of Bonaire, following stints coaching in England for Greenwich Borough, as well as coaching for Fundación Real Madrid across Europe.
