= Rudsel Sint Jago =

Bonaire football manager

Personal information
- Place of birth: Netherlands Antilles

Managerial career
- Years: Team
- 2012–2014: Bonaire

Rudsel Sint Jago is a Bonaire professional football manager.

== Career ==
Since 2012 until 2014 he coached the Bonaire national football team.
