= CF Benidorm =

Spanish football team

Benidorm
- Full name: Club de Fútbol Benidorm
- Founded: 2016; 10 years ago
- Ground: Guillermo Amor, Benidorm, Valencian Country, Spain
- Capacity: 9,000
- Owner: DV7 Group
- President: Jordi Bruixola Ruiz
- Head coach: Francisco Javier Rodríguez Vidales
- League: Lliga Comunitat – South
- 2025–26: Lliga Comunitat – South, 2nd of 16
- Website: https://cfbenidorm.es/
Home colours	Away colours

Club de Fútbol Benidorm is a Spanish football team based in Benidorm, in the Valencian Community. Founded in 2016, they play in the Lliga Comunitat – South, holding home matches at the Estadio Municipal Guillermo Amor, with a capacity of 9,000 people.

== History ==
Founded in 2016 under the name of Club de Fútbol Calvari Benidorm as an honour to dissolved Benidorm CF, the club started playing in the Segunda Regional in the following year, winning promotion as champions. In July 2019, after another promotion, the club reached an agreement with CD Polop to become their reserve team.

On 6 July 2020, it was announced that Calvari would be renamed to Club de Fútbol Benidorm, but would be registered as Racing Club de Fútbol Benidorm in the Valencian Community Football Federation. On 25 March 2023, the club was bought by DV7 Group, owned by David Villa and Víctor Oñate.

On 29 April 2024, Benidorm achieved a first-ever promotion to Tercera Federación with two rounds to go.

== Supporters ==
As of the 2023-24 season, the average attendance for matches at the Estadio Municipal Guillermo Amor was around 2,000 spectators. The club has a notable British following, driven by Benidorm’s large expatriate community and its long-standing popularity with British tourists.

== Season to season ==
Season	Tier	Division	Place	Copa del Rey
2017–18	7	2ª Reg.	1st	
2018–19	6	1ª Reg.	1st	
2019–20	5	Reg. Pref.	10th	
2020–21	5	Reg. Pref.	6th	
2021–22	6	Reg. Pref.	7th	
2022–23	6	Reg. Pref.	5th	
2023–24	6	Lliga Com.	1st	
2024–25	5	3ª Fed.	16th	
2025–26	6	Lliga Com.	2nd	
2026–27	6	Lliga Com.		

- 1 season in Tercera Federación

== See also ==
- CF Benidorm B, reserve team
