= Berry Sonnenschein =

Footballer (born 1994)

Personal information
- Full name: Berry Puck Jona Sonnenschein
- Date of birth: 12 February 1994 (age 32)
- Place of birth: Kerkrade, Netherlands
- Position: Left-back

Team information
- Current team: SV Vitesse
- Number: 4

College career
Years	Team	Apps	(Gls)
2015	UAB Blazers	16	(0)

Senior career*
Years	Team	Apps	(Gls)
2009–2010	Mbabane Swallows		
2010–2015	Willem II	0	(0)
2016	Turnhout	0	(0)
2016	Miami Dutch Lions		
2017	RKTVV		
2017	Kozakken Boys	1	(0)
2018	OSS '20		
2018–2021	Achilles Veen		
2022–	SV Vitesse		

International career^{‡}
2022–	Bonaire	24	(3)
- * Club domestic league appearances and goals ‡ National team caps and goals as of October 5, 2026

Berry Puck Jona Sonnenschein (born 12 February 1994) is a professional footballer who plays as a left-back for Bonaire League club SV Vitesse. Born in the Netherlands, he represents Bonaire internationally.

== Career ==
Born in Kerkrade, Sonnenschein grew up in Mozambique and went to boarding school in Swaizland where he started his career with Swazi side Mbabane Swallows. In 2015, he joined UAB Blazers in the United States. Before the second half of 2015–16, Sonnenschein signed for Belgian club Turnhout. In 2016, he signed for Miami Dutch Lions FC in the United States, helping them win the league.

Before the second half of 2016–17, he signed for Dutch sixth tier team RKTVV. In 2017, Sonnenschein signed for Kozakken Boys in the Dutch third tier. In 2018, Sonnenschein signed for Dutch fifth tier outfit Achilles Veen.

== Career statistics ==
As of 25 September 2026

Scores and results list Bonaire's goal tally first, score column indicates score after each Sonnenschein goal.

List of international goals scored by Berry Sonnenschein
No.	Date	Venue	Opponent	Score	Result	Competition
1	14 June 2022	Stadion Rignaal 'Jean' Francisca, Willemstad, Curaçao	U.S. Virgin Islands	2–0	2–0	2022–23 CONCACAF Nations League C
2	25 September 2026	SKNFA Technical Center, Basseterre, Saint Kitts and Nevis	Saint Kitts and Nevis	1–0	1–2	2026–27 CONCACAF Nations League B
3	5 October 2026	Hasely Crawford Stadium, Port of Spain, Trinidad and Tobago	Grenada	1–2	1–4	2026–27 CONCACAF Nations League B

=== International ===
As of match played October 5, 2026

Appearances and goals by national team and year
National team	Year	Apps	Goals
Bonaire	2022	5	1
Bonaire	2023	5	0
Bonaire	2024	7	0
Bonaire	2025	0	0
Bonaire	2026	7	1
Total		24	3
