= Najim Haddouchi =

Dutch footballer (born 1997)

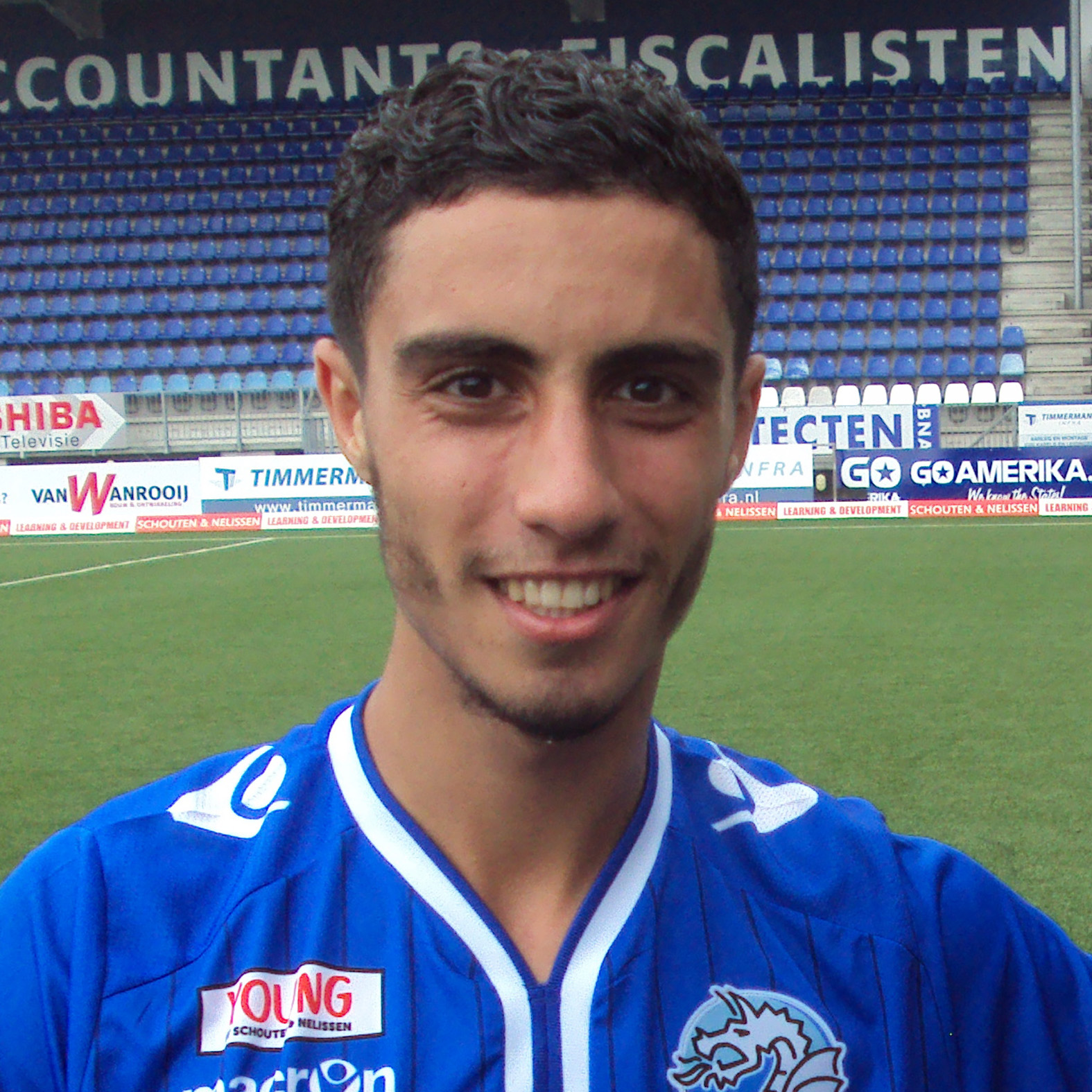

Personal information
- Date of birth: 9 June 1997 (age 29)
- Place of birth: Tilburg, Netherlands
- Height: 1.82 m (6 ft 0 in)
- Position: Attacking midfielder

Team information
- Current team: Dongen

Youth career
- 2007–2011: TSV NOAD
- 2012–2014: Den Bosch
- 2014–2016: Brabant United

Senior career*
Years	Team	Apps	(Gls)
2016–2018	Den Bosch	1	(0)
2016–2018	Jong Den Bosch	13	(2)
2018–2019	RKC	0	(0)
2019–2020	KVV Vosselaar	19	(0)
2020–2022	Dessel Sport	4	(1)
2022–2024	Unitas	25	(0)
2025–	Dongen		
- * Club domestic league appearances and goals as of 09:49, 15 November 2024 (UTC)

Najim Haddouchi (born 9 June 1997) is a Dutch footballer who plays as a midfielder for Dongen. He is of Moroccan descent.

== Club career ==
Najim Haddouchi made his professional football debut for FC Den Bosch on 12 August 2016, in the 2–1 home game against De Graafschap. He replaced Luuk Brouwers after 77 minutes. He also played for Young FC Den Bosch in the Sunday Derde Divisie. In 2018, Haddouchi transferred to RKC Waalwijk, where he primarily played in the reserves team and was on the bench with the first squad for a few matches. In 2019, he transferred to the Belgian club KVV Vosselaar in the VFV B. A year later, he transferred to Dessel Sport. In summer 2022, Haddouchi returned to the Netherlands and joined amateur side Unitas in Gorinchem.
