= Arturo Charles =

Bonaire football manager

Personal information
- Place of birth: Netherlands Antilles

Managerial career
- Years: Team
- 2010–2012: Bonaire

Arturo Charles is a Bonaire professional football manager.

== Career ==
Since 2010 until 2012 he coached the Bonaire national football team.
