= Railey Martijn =

Bonaire international footballer (born 1999)

Personal information
- Date of birth: 2 December 1999 (age 26)
- Place of birth: Rotterdam, Netherlands
- Height: 1.83 m (6 ft 0 in)
- Position: Defender

Team information
- Current team: Zwarte Pijl

Youth career
- 2003–????: XerxesDZB
- FC Zoetermeer
- Alexandria’66
- –2017: Vitesse
- 2017–2020: Feyenoord

Senior career*
Years	Team	Apps	(Gls)
2020–2024	VV Heerjansdam		
2024–2026	TOGB	41	(2)
2026–	Zwarte Pijl		

International career^{‡}
2024–	Bonaire	16	(0)
- * Club domestic league appearances and goals as of 14:59, 21 September 2026 (UTC) ‡ National team caps and goals as of October 5, 2026

Railey Martijn (born 2 December 1999) is an amateur footballer who plays as a defender for Derde Klasse side Zwarte Pijl. Born in the Netherlands, he represents the Bonaire national team.

== Early life and club career ==
Martijn joined the academy of XerxesDZB at the age of 4. He later played for the academies of FC Zoetermeer, Alexandria’66, Vitesse, and Feyenoord, before joining VV Heerjansdam in 2020.

In April 2024, Martijn helped VV Heerjansdam qualify for the KNVB Cup for the first time since 1989.

== International career ==
Martijn is eligible to represent the Bonaire national team through his grandparents. He made his debut for Bonaire in March 2024, during a 1–1 draw against El Salvador, while his competitive debut came in a 2024–25 CONCACAF Nations League B match against Saint Vincent and the Grenadines.

== Personal life ==
His brother, Rowendley, is also a footballer who plays for the Bonaire national team. Both of them work also work as security guards.
