= Thomas Schalekamp =

Dutch footballer

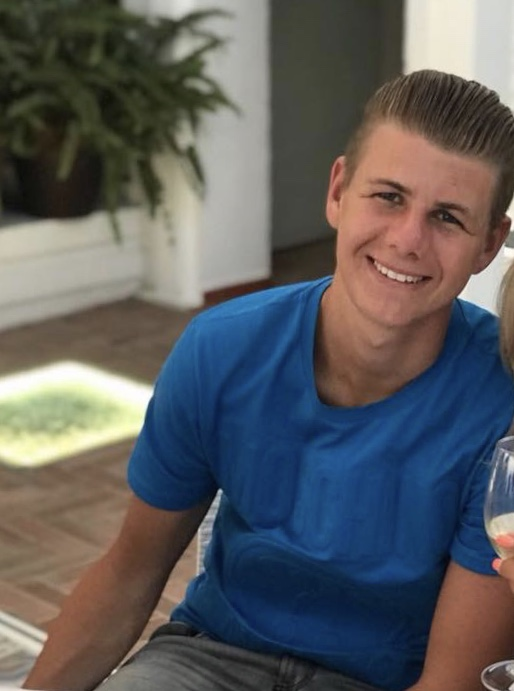

Personal information
- Date of birth: 5 June 2000 (age 26)
- Place of birth: Dordrecht, Netherlands
- Height: 1.98 m (6 ft 6 in)
- Position: Forward

Team information
- Current team: Oranje Wit

Youth career
- SC Emma
- VV Drechtstreek
- VV Dubbeldam
- Dordrecht

Senior career*
Years	Team	Apps	(Gls)
2018–2022	Dordrecht	39	(2)
2022	TEC	7	(0)
2022–2024	GVV Unitas	40	(2)
2024–	Oranje Wit		
- * Club domestic league appearances and goals as of 15 November 2024

Thomas Schalekamp (born 5 June 2000) is a Dutch footballer who plays as a forward for Eerste Klasse club Oranje Wit.

== Club career ==
He made his Eerste Divisie debut for FC Dordrecht on 5 October 2018 in a game against Cambuur, as an injury-time substitute for Jeremy Cijntje.

On 18 February 2022, Schalekamp signed for Tweede Divisie club SV TEC. He made his debut on 19 February 2022, coming on as a substitute for Jason Wall in a 1–1 draw with GVVV.

On 1 July 2022, Schalekamp signed for GVV Unitas.
