= Estadio Municipal Guillermo Amor =

Stadium in Benidorm, Alicante, Spain

Coordinates: 38°32′51″N 0°08′16″W

- Guillermo Amor
- Interactive map of Estadio Municipal Guillermo Amor
- Former names: Municipal de Foietes (1964–2010)
- Location: Benidorm, Spain
- Owner: Benidorm Municipality
- Operator: CF Benidorm
- Capacity: 5,383 (500 seats)
- Surface: Grass
- Field size: 103 * 65 yards

Construction
- Opened: 1964

Tenants
- Benidorm CF (1964–2011); CF Benidorm (2022–)

Estadio Municipal de Guillermo Amor is a stadium in Benidorm, Alicante, Valencian Community, Spain. Its former name was Estadio Municipal de Foietes or simply Foietes, but its name was changed in 2010 because of Guillermo Amor, one of the most famous sportsman who had born in the town. The sports venue has a capacity of 5,383, the majority of which is on one very large bank of terracing on one side of the field. The more commonly used main stand runs down the opposite side of the pitch and hosts the club facilities. The seating area is found here, concentrated at the half-way line of the field.

The main use is as the home ground for the local football teams Benidorm CF and CF Benidorm.

It has been known to host large concerts.
