= Rowendley Martijn =

Bonaire international footballer (born 1998)

Personal information
- Date of birth: 25 June 1998 (age 28)
- Place of birth: Rotterdam, Netherlands
- Position: Forward

Team information
- Current team: Zwarte Pijl

Senior career*
Years	Team	Apps	(Gls)
2018–2019	BVV Barendrecht	30	(3)
2019–2020	SVV Scheveningen	6	(0)
2020–2025	Feyenoord AV	22+	(5+)
2025–2026	TOGB	11	(1)
2026–	Zwarte Pijl		

International career^{‡}
2024–	Bonaire	13	(1)
- * Club domestic league appearances and goals as of 15:02, 21 September 2026 (UTC) ‡ National team caps and goals as of October 5, 2026

Rowendley Martijn (born 25 June 1998) is an amateur footballer who plays as a forward for Derde Klasse side Zwarte Pijl. Born in the Netherlands, he represents the Bonaire national team.

== Club career ==
In 2019, Martijn signed for SVV Scheveningen from BVV Barendrecht. He joined Feyenoord AV, the amateur team of Eredivise side Feyenoord, in 2020, and spent five seasons there before joining TOGB.

== International career ==
Martijn is eligible to represent the Bonaire national team through his grandparents. He made his debut for Bonaire in March 2024, during a 1–1 draw against El Salvador, while his competitive debut came in a 2024–25 CONCACAF Nations League B match against Saint Vincent and the Grenadines.

== Personal life ==
His brother, Railey, is also a footballer who plays for the Bonaire national team. Both of them work also work as security guards.
