= CF Benidorm B =

Spanish football club

Benidorm B
- Full name: Club de Fútbol Benidorm "B"
- Nickname: Atlético Benidorm
- Founded: 2009 (as SD Fundación Benidorm FB)
- Ground: Guillermo Amor, Benidorm, Valencian Community, Spain
- Capacity: 5,383
- Chairman: Jordi Bruixola Ruiz
- 2025–26: Segona FFCV – Group 7, retired
- Website: https://cfbenidorm.es/
Home colours	Away colours

Club de Fútbol Benidorm "B" is a Spanish football club based in Benidorm, Alicante in the Valencian Community. They are the reserve team of CF Benidorm, and play in the .

== History ==
Founded in 2009 as SD Fundación Benidorm FB, the club immediately entered in the Segunda Regional and achieved promotion as champions. They first reached the Regional Preferente in 2012, after two seasons in the Primera Regional, and subsequently changed name to SFFCV Benidorm FB.

Benidorm missed out promotion in the 2013–14 season; after winning their Preferente group, they lost in the promotion play-offs to CBD Massanassa. They remained in that division in the following years, and changed name to Atlético Benidorm CD in 2020 after a merger with Atlético Ciudad de Benidorm (founded in 1995).

On 23 May 2023, Atlético Benidorm reached an agreement with DV7 Group, the owner of CF Benidorm, and was integrated into the latter club's structure, becoming their reserve team and being renamed to CF Benidorm "B".

=== Club background ===
- Sección Deportiva Fundación Benidorm Fútbol Base (2009–2012)
- Sección Fútbol Fundación Comunidad Valenciana Benidorm Fútbol Base (2012–2014)
- Sección Fútbol Fundación Comunidad Valenciana Benidorm Club Deportivo (2014–2020)
- Atlético Benidorm Club Deportivo (2020–2023)
- Club de Fútbol Benidorm "B" (2023–)

== Season to season ==
- As an independent team

Season	Tier	Division	Place	Copa del Rey
2009–10	7	2ª Reg.	1st	
2010–11	6	1ª Reg.	11th	
2011–12	6	1ª Reg.	1st	
2012–13	5	Reg. Pref.	6th	
2013–14	5	Reg. Pref.	1st	
2014–15	5	Reg. Pref.	4th	
2015–16	5	Reg. Pref.	4th	

Season	Tier	Division	Place	Copa del Rey
2016–17	5	Reg. Pref.	6th	
2017–18	5	Reg. Pref.	8th	
2018–19	5	Reg. Pref.	15th	
2019–20	5	Reg. Pref.	18th	
2020–21	5	Reg. Pref.	9th	
2021–22	6	Reg. Pref.	16th	
2022–23	7	1ª Reg.	5th	

- As the reserve team of CF Benidorm

Season	Tier	Division	Place
2023–24	8	2ª FFCV	5th
2024–25	8	2ª FFCV	
