= Tom Homburg =

Bonaire footballer (born 1988)

Personal information
- Date of birth: 4 January 1988 (age 38)
- Place of birth: Nijmegen, Netherlands
- Height: 1.78 m (5 ft 10 in)
- Position: Midfielder

Youth career
- Orion

Senior career*
Years	Team	Apps	(Gls)
2007–2012	Orion		
2014–2022	Uruguay		

International career
2014–2015	Bonaire	5	(0)
- * Club domestic league appearances and goals

Tom Homburg (born 4 January 1988) is a Bonaire retired footballer who played for SV Uruguay of the Bonaire League and the Bonaire national team.

== Club career ==
As a youth, Homburg played for SV Orion in his hometown of Nijmegen, Netherlands. He, along with three other players from the junior teams, made his debut for the first team of the club in 2007 in a 3–0 victory against SC Veluwezoom. He remained with the club until at least 2012 when he appeared in a match against FC Presikhaaf on the 5 March and against SC Varsseveld on 11 March. While with Orion, Homburg played as a striker.

Since 2014, he has played for SV Uruguay of the Bonaire League.

== International career ==
Homburg made his debut for Bonaire on 3 September 2014 in a 2014 Caribbean Cup qualification match against Martinique.

== Personal life ==
Homburg attended the HAN University of Applied Sciences. Since 2013, he has been a sport coordinator on Bonaire. As of 2026, he works as an Activities Office Coordinator for the Bonaire School Community.

== Career statistics ==
As of 28 December 2015.

Bonaire national team
Year	Apps	Goals
2014	3	0
2015	2	0
Total	5	0

== Honours ==
SV Uruguay

- Kopa MCB runner-up: 2014, 2015–16
