= Bonaire national football team =

Men's national association football team representing Bonaire

Bonaire
- Association: Federashon Futbòl Boneriano (FFB)
- Confederation: CONCACAF (North America)
- Sub-confederation: CFU (Caribbean)
- Head coach: Rilove Janga
- Most caps: Ayrton Cicilia (25)
- Top scorer: Ayrton Cicilia (10)
- Home stadium: Stadion Antonio Trenidat
- FIFA code: BES; BOE
| First colours | Second colours |

First international
- (Netherlands) Aruba 4–0 Bonaire (Netherlands) (Oranjestad, Aruba; 4 February 1934) as modern Bonaire; Curaçao 4–0 Bonaire (Willemstad, Curaçao; 28 February 2010)

Biggest win
- Aruba 0–5 Bonaire (Netherlands Antilles; 6 July 1984) as modern Bonaire; Turks and Caicos Islands 1–4 Bonaire (Providenciales, Turks and Caicos Islands; 3 June 2022); Grenada 1–4 Bonaire (Port of Spain, Trinidad and Tobago; 5 October 2026)

Biggest defeat
- Curaçao 10–0 Bonaire (Netherlands Antilles; 9 August 1969) as modern Bonaire; Suriname 8–0 Bonaire (Oranjestad, Aruba; 13 July 2012)

The Bonaire national football team (Dutch: Bonairiaans voetbalelftal; Papiamento: selekshon di futbòl Boneiru) represents Bonaire, a public body of the Caribbean Netherlands in men's international football, and is governed by the Bonaire Football Federation (Papiamento: Federashon Futbòl Boneriano), the governing body for football in Bonaire founded in 1960. It has been a full member of CONCACAF since 2013, and a member of CFU in the Caribbean Zone, however, it is not affiliated with FIFA.

Bonaire has never qualified for the CONCACAF Gold Cup, but has participated twice in League B and three times in League C of the CONCACAF Nations League.

Bonaire's debut in international competitions was in the 2014 Caribbean Cup qualification. The team's first victory was in 1967 by defeating Aruba 2–1. After the dissolution of the Netherlands Antilles in 2010, the modern Bonaire's first victory was in 2011 by defeating Curaçao 3–1.

== History ==
Between 1960 when the Bonaire Football Federation was founded and 1988, a Bonaire selection played over fifty unofficial interinsular matches against Curaçao and Aruba. The first such match was a 0–2 defeat to Curaçao on 7 March 1960. On 14 January 1987 and 16 January 1991, an amateur Dutch selection played matches against Bonaire on Bonaire while touring the Caribbean. The matches ended in 1–4 and 2–5 defeats, respectively. In June 2008, a Bonaire selection was assembled for a match against NEC Nijmegen as the club held a training camp on the Island. Approximately 1500 spectators attended the match at the Municipal Stadium. The match also marked Lasse Schöne's first appearance for the club.

Until 2010 people from Bonaire competed in confederated football as part of the Netherlands Antilles national football team. After the Netherlands Antilles was dissolved as a unified political entity (a country within the Kingdom of the Netherlands) on 10 October 2010, the five constituent islands took on new constitutional statuses within the Kingdom of the Netherlands. The Netherlands Antilles national team was succeeded by the Curaçao national football team and remained thus a CFU, CONCACAF and FIFA member, while Aruba was already a FIFA and CONCACAF member after registering their own association and leaving the Netherlands Antilles team in 1986. Sint Maarten was also already an independent member of CONCACAF. Before Bonaire was a member of the CFU or CONCACAF, they competed in the ABCS Tournament, a competition between the Dutch-speaking teams of the Caribbean (Aruba, Bonaire, Curaçao, and Suriname), since its inception in 2010 and were surprise champions in 2011. Bonaire assembled a squad for a match on 28 February 2010 for a friendly against Curaçao, months before the Netherlands Antilles was dissolved. The match ended in a 4–0 victory for Curaçao. Bonaire's first match after the Netherlands Antilles was dissolved was an eventual 2–4 defeat to Suriname in the 2010 ABCS Tournament on 29 October 2010,19 days after the islands gained their new status in the Kingdom of the Netherlands.

On 19 April 2013, Bonaire was accepted as an associate member of CONCACAF at CONCACAF's XXVIII Ordinary Congress held in Panama City, Panama, a process that took two years. The membership process was delayed when Bonaire's applications to join CONCACAF and the CFU went missing after being sent to president Jack Warner. Around the same time that Bonaire was named an associate member of CONCACAF, it was named a full member of the Caribbean Football Union as the subconfederation's 31st member. Previously, Bonaire was a provisional member before submitting the final paperwork and adjusting the federation's statutes to meet CFU requirements. Bonaire became a full member of CONCACAF at the confederation's next Ordinary Congress on 10 June 2014 in São Paulo, Brazil.

Although Bonaire is not a member, national team player Lacey Pauletta has expressed his desire that Bonaire becomes a FIFA member in the future. FIFA statutes allow only associations of internationally recognised independent countries to become members, as well as entities "which [have] not yet gained independence" provided the "association in the country on which it is dependent" authorizes membership. The requirements of independence or "gaining independence" did not apply to 17 out of the 18 members of FIFA that are not fully independent states, including all 10 Caribbean members, as they entered before the rules were changed. Although the KNVB supports the BFF with training courses, infrastructure, and with goal projects, no express authorization of such a move for Bonaire is reported. Any association seeking affiliation to FIFA must observe FIFA's further regulations related to the subject. In a 2007 independent report on the sports facilities of the BES islands, Bonaire's facilities were described as adequate in number but "substandard" and "hardly maintained", potentially providing a further hurdle to FIFA membership because of the governing body's lengthy stadium recommendations and requirements which include, "...surrounding a football field with a running track in a modern stadium should be avoided" as part of its stance against multi-purpose stadiums. In 2008, FIFA and the KNVB began a Goal Project on Bonaire, creating two full-sized and one small-sized football pitch with accommodation facilities. An extension of the existing facilities was also part of the project. Goal Projects are part of the Goal Programme which has enabled beneficiary member associations to implement projects designed to develop football in their countries.

It had been announced that Bonaire would host the 2013 ABCS tournament. However, because of financial difficulties, it was later announced that Curaçao would host the tournament between 16 and 18 November. After initially stating that they would not take part in the tournament at all, Bonaire later announced that they would compete in the tournament. Bonaire went on to play their first match after joining CONCACAF in the tournament, a 0–2 loss to Suriname on 14 November 2013. The tournament, in which they finished in 3rd place, also saw them record their first victory after joining, a 2–1 victory over Aruba on 16 November 2013, and score their first goal after joining, a 74th-minute strike from Ilfred Piar in the same match.

On 1 June 2014, Bonaire played their first match in a CONCACAF competition, a 2–1 victory over the US Virgin Islands during the preliminary round of 2014 Caribbean Cup qualification. Two days later, Bonaire held Montserrat to a scoreless draw to top their group and advance to face Martinique, Barbados, and Suriname in the second round of qualification. On 10 June 2014, only a few days after their success in the preliminary round of 2014 Caribbean Cup qualification, Bonaire became a full member of CONCACAF. After posting one win and two losses in the next round of qualifying, Bonaire was eliminated from their maiden Caribbean Cup qualifying campaign as Barbados and Martinique advanced from the group. Bonaire came close to qualifying for the next round of qualifying by being the top third place team but were topped by the Dominican Republic who had a superior goal difference of +8 to −8.

In March 2018 it was announced that FFB president Ludwig Balentin met with FIFA president Gianni Infantino to begin the process of gaining FIFA membership. As part of the new agreement, which was supported and facilitated by the KNVB, Bonaire would be invited to future FIFA conferences. Only a few days later, it was announced that Bonaire would take part in the inaugural edition of the CONCACAF Nations League.

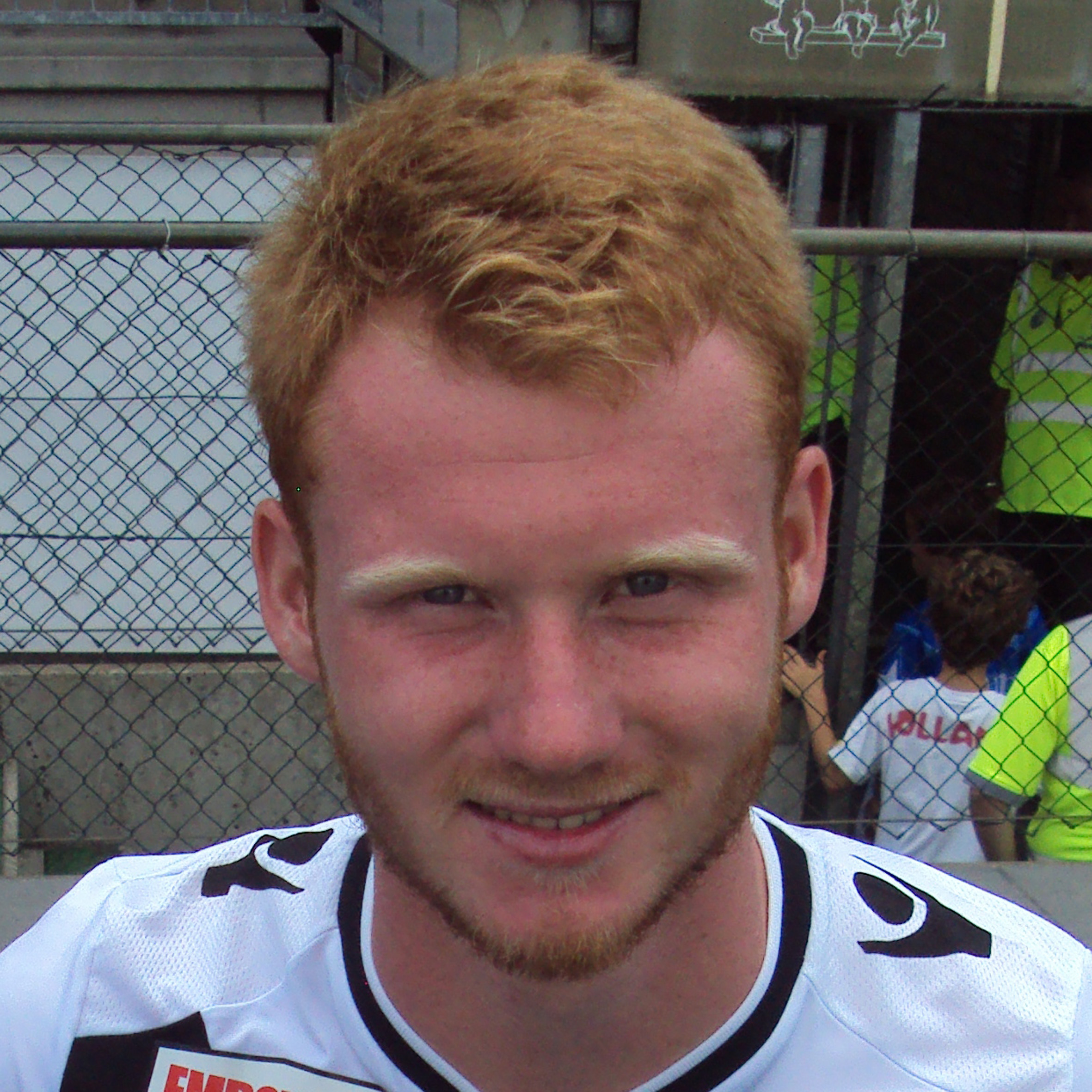
Jort van der Sande made his international debut for Bonaire in 2023

In September 2019, Bonaire's application for FIFA membership was denied. A year later, it was announced that the island's football federation was appealing the decision in the Court of Arbitration for Sport and that the proceedings had already begun. Ultimately the appeal was unsuccessful and the CIS ruled in favor of FIFA.

== Stadium ==
| Stadium | Capacity | City |
|---|---|---|
| Stadion Antonio Trenidat | 1,500 | Rincon |
| Municipal Stadium | 3,000 | Kralendijk |

Bonaire historically played their home matches at the Municipal Stadium, currently named Digicel Kralendijk Stadium for sponsorship reasons, located in Kralendijk, Bonaire's main city. The stadium has a capacity of 3,000 spectators. In 2006, the cellular phone service provider Digicel donated USD $240,000 to the Bonaire Football Association which was, in part, used to renovate the national stadium. Artificial turf was installed at the stadium, along with the Stadion Antonio Trenidat in Rincon, in 2012 with financial assistance from FIFA and the Dutch KNVB.

Following renovations to bring it up to FIFA international standards, including installing new artificial turf and lighting, the Stadion Antonio Trenidat hosted the first-ever official match of the Bonaire national team on home soil on 28 March 2023. The eventual 1–2 defeat to the Turks and Caicos closed out Bonaire's 2022–23 CONCACAF Nations League C campaign.

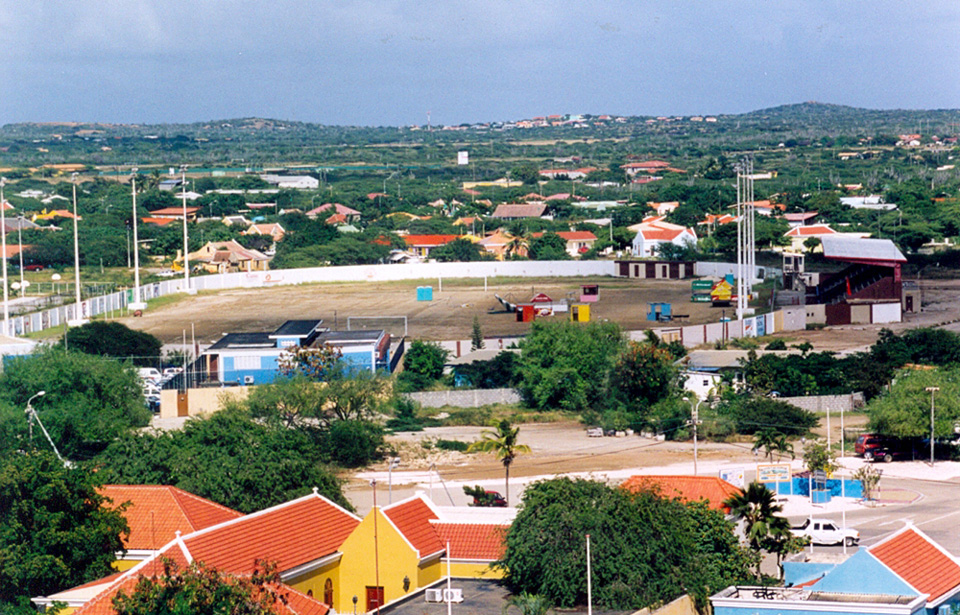
Kralendijk Municipal Stadium, Prior to Renovations

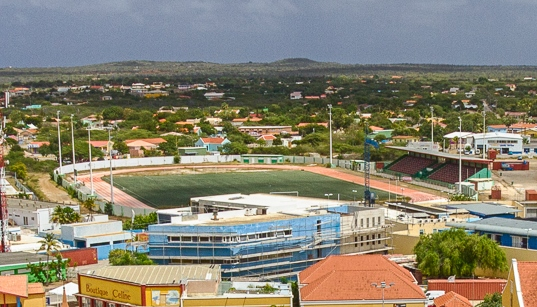
Kralendijk Municipal Stadium, After Renovations (March 2014)

== Kit ==
Bonaire's old kit provider is Dutch sportswear company Masita. Home kits are all yellow with blue piping on the jersey while the away kit is all white with blue piping on the jersey. Both jerseys include the flag of Bonaire on the left breast and the coat of arms of Bonaire on the right. Bonaire's current kit provider is Dutch sportwear company: Robey Sportwear

== Results and fixtures ==
The following is a list of match results in the last 12 months, as well as any future matches that have been scheduled.

Win Draw Loss Fixture

=== 2025 ===
| 12 November 2025–26 CONCACAF Series | Barbados | 3–2 | Bonaire | North Sound, Antigua and Barbuda |
| 16:00 UTC−4 | | Report | Cicilia; Gerardo-Felicia | Stadium: Sir Vivian Richards Stadium |

| 15 November 2025–26 CONCACAF Series | Guyana | 2–1 | Bonaire | North Sound, Antigua and Barbuda |
| | Duke-McKenna 5'; De Rosario 77' | Report (GFA); Report (BFF) | Clijdesdale 16' | Stadium: Sir Vivian Richards Stadium |

=== 2026 ===
| 26 March 2025–26 CONCACAF Series | Bonaire | 3–1 | Saint Vincent and the Grenadines | Rincon, Bonaire |
| 20:30 UTC−4 | Koorn 39'; Christopher 57' (o.g.); Isenia 77' (pen.) | Report | Pierre 37' | Stadium: Stadion Antonio Trenidat; Referee: Norberto da Silva (Curaçao) |

| 29 March 2025–26 CONCACAF Series | Bonaire | 0–3 | Saint Martin | Rincon, Bonaire |
| 20:30 UTC−4 | Oleana (red card) 87' | Report | Alexandre 39'; Léo 51'; Denis 68' | Stadium: Stadion Antonio Trenidat |

| 6 June 2026 Friendly | Bonaire | 0–2 | British Virgin Islands | Malaga, Spain |
| 19:00 | | | Bertie; Chalwell |

| 25 September 2026–27 CONCACAF Nations League B | Bonaire | 1–2 | Saint Kitts and Nevis | Basseterre, Saint Kitts and Nevis |
| 20:00 | Sonnenschein 7' | Report | Williams 36', 89' | Stadium: SKNFA Technical Center; Referee: Karen Hernández (Mexico) |

| 28 September 2026–27 CONCACAF Nations League B | Cuba | 2–0 | Bonaire | Basseterre, Saint Kitts and Nevis |
| 17:00 | Matos 3'; Catasus 49' | Report | | Stadium: SKNFA Technical Center; Referee: Christopher Mason (Jamaica) |

| 2 October 2026–27 CONCACAF Nations League B | Bonaire | 2–3 | Grenada | Port of Spain, Trinidad and Tobago |
| 20:00 | A. Cicilia 7'; Bostdorp 33' | Report | Hippolyte 50' (pen.); Ettienne 55'; Redhead 69' | Stadium: Hasely Crawford Stadium; Referee: Moeth Gaymes (Saint Vincent and the Grenadines) |

| 5 October 2026–27 CONCACAF Nations League B | Grenada | 1–4 | Bonaire | Port of Spain, Trinidad and Tobago |
| 20:00 | Ettienne 11' | Report | Martijn 13'; Sonnenschein 59'; Bostdorp 67'; A. Cicilia 83' | Stadium: Hasely Crawford Stadium; Referee: Jorge Leira (Panama) |

| 12 November 2026–27 CONCACAF Nations League B | Bonaire | 1–7 | Cuba | Estadio La Polar, Havana (Cuba) |
| 20:00 | Bostdorp 58' | Report | Camejo 7'; Aguirre 51'; Y. Pérez 56'; Díaz 69', 77'; Paradela 74'; Reinoso 79' | Referee: Jefferson Escobar (Honduras) |

| 17 November 2026–27 CONCACAF Nations League B | Saint Kitts and Nevis | 3–2 | Bonaire | Estadio La Polar, Havana (Cuba) |
| 20:00 | Panayiotou 43'; Williams 49' (pen.), 74' | Report | Bostdorp 28'; Anthony 36' | Attendance: 87; Referee: Selvin Brown (Honduras) |

== Coaching staff ==
As of 30 May 2014

| Name | Nation | Position |
|---|---|---|
| Rilove Janga | (Bonaire) | Head coach |
| Celsio Mook | (Bonaire) | Assistant coach |
| Alsi Anthony | (Bonaire) | Assistant coach |
| Arviena Vis | (Bonaire) | Assistant coach |
| Danielo Quirindoongo | (Bonaire) | Physical therapist |
| Ludwig Balentin | (Bonaire) | Delegate |

=== Manager history ===
- (Bonaire) Arturo Charles (2010–2012)
- (Bonaire) Rudsel Sint Jago (2012–2014)
- (Bonaire) Ferdinand Bernabela (2014–2015)
- (Argentina) (Italy) Emmanuel Cristori (2017–2018)
- (Bonaire) Robert Winklaar (2018)
- (Bonaire) Alexandro Raphaela (2019)
- (Aruba) Brian van den Bergh (2019)
- (Bonaire) Mauricio Tobón (Tobon) (2021–2023)
- (Bonaire) Rilove Janga (2023–)

== Players ==
=== Current squad ===
- The following players were called up for the 2026–27 CONCACAF Nations League matches.
- Match dates: September 25, 28 and October 2, 2026
- Opposition: Saint Kitts & Nevis; Cuba; Grenada
- Caps and goals correct as of: October 5, 2026, after the match against the Grenada national football team

| No. | Pos. | Player | Date of birth (age) | Caps | Goals | Club |
|---|---|---|---|---|---|---|
| 1 | GK | Denyor Cicilia | 29 May 2007 (age 19) | 15 | 0 | (Royal Dutch Football Association) VVV-Venlo U21 |
| 12 | GK | Sammir Ramos | 13 November 2004 (age 22) | 1 | 0 | (Royal Dutch Football Association) RV & AV Sparta Rotterdam |
| 22 | GK | Jonas Lafeber | 8 November 1995 (age 31) | 5 | 0 | (Bonaire Football Federation) Real Rincon |
| 2 | DF | Jaydelmar Jansen | 16 August 2005 (age 21) | 5 | 0 | (Royal Dutch Football Association) FC Dordrecht U21 |
| 3 | DF | Marshelon Pourier | 6 December 2002 (age 23) | 20 | 1 | (Royal Dutch Football Association) VV Hoogeveen |
| 4 | DF | Railey Martijn | 2 December 1999 (age 26) | 16 | 0 | (Royal Dutch Football Association) CSV Zwarte Pijl |
| 5 | DF | Mouro Cicilia | 5 August 2009 (age 17) | 3 | 0 | (Bonaire Football Federation) Atlétiko Flamingo |
| 6 | DF | Suerainy Coffy | 16 January 2002 (age 24) | 6 | 0 | (Royal Dutch Football Association) RVVH Ridderkerk |
| 8 | DF | Berry Sonnenschein | 12 February 1994 (age 32) | 24 | 3 | (Bonaire Football Federation) SV Vitesse |
| 13 | DF | Rayvion Simon | 20 April 2010 (age 16) | 0 | 0 | (Bonaire Football Federation) Atlétiko Tera Corá |
| 15 | DF | Shedwin Martina | 9 January 2004 (age 22) | 7 | 0 | (Royal Dutch Football Association) Kozakken Boys |
| 18 | DF | Jevairo Pengel | 9 January 2004 (age 22) | 8 | 0 | (Royal Dutch Football Association) HSV Hoek |
| 19 | DF | Robin Cijntje | 30 April 2006 (age 20) | 3 | 0 | (Royal Dutch Football Association) FC Emmen U21 |
| 20 | DF | Christopher Isenia | 29 October 1993 (age 33) | 16 | 2 | (Bonaire Football Federation) Atlétiko Flamingo |
| 23 | DF | Devin Koorn | 13 June 2004 (age 22) | 4 | 1 | (United States Soccer Federation) Life Running Eagles |
| 10 | MF | Ninho Felicia | 14 December 2006 (age 19) | 11 | 2 | (Royal Dutch Football Association) FC Dordrecht |
| 14 | MF | Milan Blanken | 30 May 2007 (age 19) | 4 | 0 | (Polish Football Association) Olimpia Zambrów |
| 21 | MF | Rayginio Martina | 15 July 2005 (age 21) | 2 | 0 | (Royal Dutch Football Association) VV Nieuwenhoorn |
| 9 | FW | Ayrton Cicilia | 2 March 2001 (age 25) | 25 | 10 | Unattached |
| 7 | FW | Rowendley Martijn | 25 June 1998 (age 28) | 13 | 1 | (Royal Dutch Football Association) CSV Zwarte Pijl |
| 11 | FW | Fabio Hierck | 15 April 1999 (age 27) | 12 | 0 | (Bonaire Football Federation) Atlétiko Flamingo |
| 16 | FW | Shi-jon Martina | 14 November 2004 (age 22) | 5 | 0 | (Royal Dutch Football Association) GVVV |
| 17 | FW | Myron Bostdorp | 15 November 2002 (age 24) | 4 | 2 | (Royal Dutch Football Association) Hoek |

=== Recent call-ups ===
The following players have been called up within the last 12 months.

| Pos. | Player | Date of birth (age) | Caps | Goals | Club | Latest call-up |
|---|---|---|---|---|---|---|
| DF | Timothy Muller | 2 August 2007 (age 19) | 8 | 0 | (Netherlands) FC Twente U21 | v. Saint Kitts and Nevis, 26 Sept 2026 |

== Player records ==
As of 6 October 2026
Players in bold are still active with Bonaire.

=== Most appearances ===
| Rank | Player | Caps | Goals | Career |
|---|---|---|---|---|
| 1 | **Ayrton Cicilia** | 25 | 10 | 2018–present |
| 2 | **Berry Sonnenschein** | 24 | 3 | 2018–present |
| 3 | **Yurick Seinpaal** | 22 | 6 | 2013–present |
| 4 | **Marshelon Pourier** | 20 | 1 | 2023–present |
| 5 | **Jonathan Libiana** | 17 | 2 | 2022–present |
| 5 | **Richajier Oleana** | 17 | 0 | 2022–present |
| 7 | **Adri Serberie** | 16 | 0 | 2019–present |
| 7 | **Railey Martijn** | 16 | 0 | 2024–present |
| 9 | Rishison Frans | 15 | 0 | 2015–2023 |
| 9 | Robert Frans | 15 | 0 | 2015–2023 |
| 9 | **Denyor Cicilia** | 15 | 0 | 2023–present |
| 9 | **Rogyaer Anita** | 15 | 0 | 2022–present |

=== Top goalscorers ===
| Rank | Player | Goals | Caps | Ratio | Career |
|---|---|---|---|---|---|
| 1 | **Ayrton Cicilia** | 10 | 25 | 0.4 | 2018–present |
| 2 | **Yurick Seinpaal** | 6 | 21 | 0.29 | 2013–present |
| 3 | Suehendley Barzey | 3 | 7 | 0.43 | 2013–2015 |
| 3 | **Berry Sonnenschein** | 3 | 24 | 0.13 | 2022–present |
| 5 | Kenny Kunst | 2 | 2 | 1 | 2011 |
| 5 | Edshel Martha | 2 | 4 | 0.5 | 2018–2019 |
| 5 | **Thierry Anthony** | 2 | 6 | 0.33 | 2023–present |
| 5 | **Quincy Hoeve** | 2 | 8 | 0.25 | 2022–present |
| 5 | Jermaine Windster | 2 | 9 | 0.22 | 2018–2023 |
| 5 | Ilfred Piar | 2 | 8 | 0.25 | 2013–2019 |
| 5 | Guillermo Montero | 2 | 9 | 0.22 | 2014–2023 |
| 5 | **Ninho Felicia** | 2 | 11 | 0.18 | 2024–present |
| 5 | **Jurven Koffy** | 2 | 12 | 0.17 | 2018–present |
| 5 | **Christopher Isenia** | 2 | 16 | 0.13 | 2012–present |
| 5 | **Jonathan Libiana** | 2 | 17 | 0.12 | 2022–present |

== Competitive record ==
=== CONCACAF Gold Cup ===
| CONCACAF Championship / Gold Cup record | | | | | | | | | | Qualification record | | | | | |
| Year | Round | Pos. | Pld | W | D | L | GF | GA | Squad | Pld | W | D | L | GF | GA |
|---|---|---|---|---|---|---|---|---|---|---|---|---|---|---|---|
| 1963 to 2009 | Part of Netherlands Antilles | | | | | | | | | Part of Netherlands Antilles | | | | | |
| 2011 and 2013 | Not a CONCACAF member | | | | | | | | | Not a CONCACAF member | | | | | |
| (Canada) (United States) 2015 | Did not qualify | | | | | | | | | 5 | 2 | 1 | 2 | 6 | 13 |
| (United States) 2017 | Did not participate | | | | | | | | | Did not participate | | | | | |
| (Costa Rica) (Jamaica) (United States) 2019 | Did not qualify | | | | | | | | | 4 | 1 | 0 | 3 | 3 | 14 |
| (United States) 2021 | Did not qualify | | | | | | | | | 4 | 2 | 1 | 1 | 10 | 8 |
| (Canada) (United States) 2023 | Did not qualify | | | | | | | | | 6 | 3 | 1 | 2 | 12 | 11 |
| (Canada) (United States) 2025 | Did not qualify | | | | | | | | | 6 | 1 | 1 | 4 | 4 | 8 |
| Total | — | 0/5 | — | | | | | | | 25 | 9 | 4 | 12 | 35 | 54 |

=== CONCACAF Nations League ===
CONCACAF Nations League record
| League phase | | | | | | | | | | | Final phase | | | | | | | | | |
| Season | Div. | Group | Pos. | Pld | W | D | L | GF | GA | P/R | Finals | Round | Pos. | Pld | W | D | L | GF | GA | Squad |
|---|---|---|---|---|---|---|---|---|---|---|---|---|---|---|---|---|---|---|---|---|
| 2019–20 | C | B | 7th | 4 | 2 | 1 | 1 | 10 | 8 | Same position | (United States) 2021 | Ineligible | | | | | | | | |
| 2022–23 | C | A | 5th | 6 | 3 | 1 | 2 | 12 | 11 | Same position | (United States) 2023 | Ineligible | | | | | | | | |
| 2023–24 | C | A | 4th | 4 | 2 | 0 | 2 | 6 | 6 | ▲ | (United States) 2024 | Ineligible | | | | | | | | |
| 2024–25 | B | A | 12th | 6 | 1 | 1 | 4 | 4 | 8 | Same position | (United States) 2025 | Ineligible | | | | | | | | |
| 2026–27 | B | To be determined | | | | | | | | | 2027 | Ineligible | | | | | | | | |
| Total | | | | 20 | 8 | 3 | 9 | 32 | 33 | — | Total | — | | | | | | | | |

CONCACAF Nations League history
| First match | Bonaire 4–2 British Virgin Islands (6 September 2019; Willemstad, Curaçao) |
| Biggest Win | Bonaire 4–1 Turks and Caicos Islands (3 June 2022; Providenciales, Turks and Caicos Islands); Bonaire 3–0 Anguilla (18 November 2023; The Valley, Anguilla) |
| Biggest Defeat | Sint Maarten 6–1 Bonaire (25 March 2023; Saint Croix, United States Virgin Islands) |
| Best Result | 12th – League B (2024–25) |
| Worst Result | 7th – League C (2019–20) |

=== Caribbean Cup ===
| CFU Championship / Caribbean Cup record | | | | | | | | | Qualification record | | | | | |
| Year | Round | Pos. | Pld | W | D | L | GF | GA | Pld | W | D | L | GF | GA |
|---|---|---|---|---|---|---|---|---|---|---|---|---|---|---|
| 1978 to 2010 | Part of Netherlands Antilles | | | | | | | | Part of Netherlands Antilles | | | | | |
| (Antigua and Barbuda) 2012 | Did not participate | | | | | | | | Did not participate | | | | | |
| (Jamaica) 2014 | Did not qualify | | | | | | | | 5 | 2 | 1 | 2 | 6 | 13 |
| (Martinique) 2017 | Did not participate | | | | | | | | Did not participate | | | | | |
| Total | — | 0/1 | — | | | | | | 5 | 2 | 1 | 2 | 6 | 13 |

=== ABCS Tournament ===
ABCS Tournament record
| Year | Round | Pos. | Pld | W | D | L | GF | GA |
|---|---|---|---|---|---|---|---|---|
| (Curaçao) 2010 | Fourth place | 4th | 2 | 0 | 1 | 1 | 5 | 7 |
| (Suriname) 2011 | Champions | 1st | 2 | 1 | 1 | 0 | 5 | 3 |
| (Aruba) 2012 | Fourth place | 4th | 2 | 0 | 0 | 2 | 2 | 17 |
| (Curaçao) 2013 | Third place | 3rd | 2 | 1 | 0 | 1 | 2 | 3 |
| (Suriname) 2015 | Fourth place | 4th | 2 | 0 | 0 | 2 | 1 | 7 |
| (Curaçao) 2021 | Runners-up | 2nd | 2 | 1 | 0 | 1 | 4 | 4 |
| (Curaçao) 2022 | Fourth place | 4th | 2 | 0 | 0 | 2 | 1 | 5 |
| Total | 1 title | 7/7 | 14 | 3 | 2 | 9 | 20 | 46 |

== Head-to-head record ==
As of 5 October 2026, includes matches after CONCACAF acceptance

| Against | Played | Won | Drawn | Lost | GF | GA | GD |
|---|---|---|---|---|---|---|---|
| Anguilla | 2 | 2 | 0 | 0 | 5 | 0 | +5 |
| Aruba | 1 | 1 | 0 | 0 | 2 | 1 | +1 |
| Bahamas | 2 | 0 | 1 | 1 | 2 | 3 | –1 |
| Barbados | 2 | 0 | 0 | 2 | 3 | 7 | −4 |
| British Virgin Islands | 4 | 3 | 0 | 1 | 10 | 8 | +2 |
| Cuba | 1 | 0 | 0 | 1 | 0 | 2 | –2 |
| Curaçao | 2 | 0 | 0 | 2 | 1 | 5 | −4 |
| Dominican Republic | 1 | 0 | 0 | 1 | 0 | 5 | −5 |
| El Salvador | 3 | 0 | 1 | 2 | 2 | 4 | –2 |
| Grenada | 2 | 1 | 0 | 1 | 6 | 4 | +2 |
| Guyana | 1 | 0 | 0 | 1 | 1 | 2 | –1 |
| Jamaica | 1 | 0 | 0 | 1 | 0 | 6 | −6 |
| Martinique | 1 | 0 | 0 | 1 | 0 | 6 | −6 |
| Montserrat | 3 | 1 | 1 | 1 | 1 | 1 | 0 |
| Niger | 1 | 0 | 0 | 1 | 0 | 6 | -6 |
| Saint Martin | 3 | 0 | 0 | 3 | 1 | 9 | -8 |
| Saint Kitts and Nevis | 1 | 0 | 0 | 1 | 1 | 2 | –1 |
| Saint Vincent and the Grenadines | 3 | 1 | 1 | 1 | 5 | 4 | +1 |
| Sint Maarten | 2 | 0 | 1 | 1 | 3 | 8 | –5 |
| Suriname | 3 | 1 | 0 | 2 | 3 | 7 | −4 |
| Turks and Caicos Islands | 2 | 1 | 0 | 1 | 5 | 3 | +2 |
| U.S. Virgin Islands | 1 | 1 | 0 | 0 | 2 | 1 | +1 |
| Total | 41 | 12 | 5 | 24 | 53 | 88 | −35 |

== Honours ==
=== Friendly / Unofficial ===
- ABCS Tournament (1): 2011
